= Clara Tauson career statistics =

Career finals
Discipline	Type	Won	Lost	Total
Singles	Grand Slam	–	–	0
Singles	WTA Finals	–	–	0
Singles	WTA 1000 (Note: Formerly known as: Tier I (1990–2008); WTA Premier Mandatory & Premier 5 (2009–2020))	–	–	0
Singles	WTA 500 (Note: Formerly known as: Tier II (until 2009); WTA Premier (2009–2021))	–	–	0
Singles	WTA 250 (Note: Formerly known as: Tier III, IV & V (until 2009); WTA International (until 2021))	3	1	4
Singles	Olympics	–	–	0
Singles	Total	3	1	4
Doubles	Grand Slam	–	–	0
Doubles	WTA Finals	–	–	0
Doubles	WTA 1000	–	–	0
Doubles	WTA 500	–	–	0
Doubles	WTA 250	–	–	0
Doubles	Olympics	–	–	0
Doubles	Total	0	0	0

This is a list of career achievements by Danish tennis player Clara Tauson.

== Performance timelines ==
Key
W	F	SF	QF	#R	RR	Q#	DNQ	A	NH

(W) winner; (F) finalist; (SF) semifinalist; (QF) quarterfinalist; (#R) rounds 4, 3, 2, 1; (RR) round-robin stage; (Q#) qualification round; (DNQ) did not qualify; (A) absent; (NH) not held; (SR) strike rate (events won / competed); (W–L) win–loss record.
To avoid confusion and double counting, these charts are updated at the conclusion of a tournament or when the player's participation has ended.

(NMS) not a Masters tournament and did not participate.

Only main-draw results in WTA Tour, Grand Slam tournaments, Billie Jean King Cup (Fed Cup), United Cup, Hopman Cup and Olympic Games are included in win–loss records.

=== Singles ===
Tournament	2017	2018	2019	2020	2021	2022	2023	2024	2025	2026	SR	W–L	Win%
Grand Slam tournaments
Australian Open	A	A	A	A	Q1	3R	A	2R	3R	3R	0 / 4	7–4	64%
French Open	A	A	A	2R	2R	A	3R	4R	3R	1R	0 / 6	9–6	60%
Wimbledon	A	A	A	NH	1R	1R	Q3	1R	4R	1R	0 / 5	3–5	38%
US Open	A	A	A	A	2R	1R	2R	2R	1R	1R	0 / 5	3–5	38%
Win–loss	0–0	0–0	0–0	1–1	2–3	2–3	3–2	5–4	7–4	2–3	0 / 20	22–20	52%
National representation
Summer Olympics	NH				A	NH		1R	NH		0 / 1	0–1	0%
BJK Cup	POZ2	POZ2	Z1	POZ2 (Note: Edition is split into the two years due to COVID-19.)		A	Z1	PO	A		0 / 0	15–5	75%
WTA 1000 tournaments
Qatar Open	NTI	A	NTI	A	NTI	2R	NTI	A	1R	1R	0 / 3	1–3	25%
Dubai Championships	A	NTI	A	NTI	A	NTI	A	A	F	QF	0 / 2	8–2	80%
Indian Wells Open	A	A	A	NH	A	3R	A	Q2	3R	3R	0 / 3	3–3	50%
Miami Open	A	A	A	NH	A	1R	A	2R	3R	2R	0 / 4	2–4	33%
Madrid Open	A	A	A	NH	A	1R	A	A	2R	A	0 / 2	0–2	0%
Italian Open	A	A	A	A	A	A	A	2R	4R	2R	0 / 2	3–3	50%
Canadian Open	A	A	A	NH	A	A	A	1R	SF	1R	0 / 2	4–2	67%
Cincinnati Open	A	A	A	A	A	Q1	A	Q1	3R	3R	0 / 1	1–1	50%
China Open	A	A	A	NH			A	2R	2R		0 / 2	1–2	33%
Wuhan Open	A	A	Q1	NH				A	3R		0 / 1	2–1	67%
Win–loss	0–0	0–0	0–0	0–0	0–0	2–4	0–0	3–4	13-10		0 / 8	5–8	38%
Career statistics
	2017	2018	2019	2020	2021	2022	2023	2024	2025	2026	SR	W–L	Win%
Tournaments	0	0 (Note: During the season, she did not play in the main draw of any tour-level tournaments. However, she played at the Billie Jean King Cup, which is not counted as a played tournament but matches counted.)	1	1	12	11	8	17	23	15	Career total: 88		
Titles	0	0	0	0	2	0	0	0	1		Career total: 3		
Finals	0	0	0	0	3	0	0	0	2		Career total: 5		
Hard win–loss	0–0	0–0	0–2	3–1	16–4	7–9	7–7	11–13	26–14	8–8	3 / 57	78–58	57%
Clay win–loss	0–0	2–1	0–1	1–1	3–4	0–1	8–1	9–3	4–5	0–3	0 / 19	27–20	57%
Grass win–loss	0–0	0–0	0–0	0–0	0–2	0–1	0–0	0–2	6–3	2–4	0 / 12	8–12	40%
Overall win–loss	0–0	2–1	0–3	4–2	19–10	7–11	15–8	20–18	36–22	10–15	3 / 89	113–90	56%
Win %	–	67%	0%	67%	66%	39%	65%	53%	62%	40%	Career total: 56%		
Year-end ranking	938	863	267	152	44	128	85	52	12		$1,476,775		

=== Doubles ===
Tournament	2019	2020	2021	2022	2023	2024	2025	2026	SR	W–L	Win %
Grand Slam tournaments
Australian Open	A	A	A	1R	A	A	1R	2R	0 / 2	0–2	
French Open	A	A	A	A	A	A	1R	1R	0 / 1	0–1	
Wimbledon	A	NH	1R	A	A	1R	2R	1R	0 / 3	1–3	
US Open	A	A	A	1R	A	1R	A		0 / 2	0–2	
Win–loss	0–0	0–0	0–1	0–2	0–0	0–1	1–3		0 / 8	1–8	
WTA 1000 tournaments
Qatar Open	NTI	A	NTI	1R	NTI	A	A	QF	0 / 1	1–1	
Dubai Championships	A	NTI	A	NTI	A	A	2R	QF	0 / 2	3–1	
Indian Wells Open	A	A	A	1R	A	A	2R	1R	0 / 2	1–2	
Miami Open	A	A	A	1R	A	A	1R	A	0 / 2	0–2	
Madrid Open	A	A	A	A	A	A	QF	1R	0 / 1	2–1	
Italian Open	A	A	A	A	A	A	1R	A	0 / 1	0–1	
Canadian Open	A	A	A	A	A	1R	A	QF	0 / 1	0–1	
Cincinnati Open	A	A	A	A	A	A	2R	1R	0 / 0	0–0	
China Open	A	NH			A	A	1R		0 / 0	0–0	
Wuhan Open	A	NH				A	1R		0 / 0	0–0	
Career statistics
Tournaments	1	0	2	7	0	5	11		Career total: 26		
Overall win–loss	0–1	0–0	0–2	0–7	0–0	0–5	8–11		0 / 26	8–26	
Year-end ranking	n/a	630	450	848	n/a	1027	75				

== WTA 1000 tournament finals ==
==== Singles: 1 (1 runner-up) ====
Result	Year	Tournament	Surface	Opponent	Score
Loss	2025	Dubai Championships	Hard	Mirra Andreeva	6–7^{(1–7)}, 1–6

== WTA Tour finals ==
=== Singles: 5 (3 titles, 2 runner-ups) ===
Legend WTA 1000 (0–1) WTA 250 (3–1)	Finals by surface Hard (3–2)

Result	W–L	Date	Tournament	Tier	Surface	Opponent	Score
Win	1–0	Mar 2021	Lyon Open, France	WTA 250	Hard (i)	(Switzerland) Viktorija Golubic	6–4, 6–1
Win	2–0	Sep 2021	Luxembourg Open, Luxembourg	WTA 250	Hard (i)	(Latvia) Jeļena Ostapenko	6–3, 4–6, 6–4
Loss	2–1	Oct 2021	Courmayeur Open, Italy	WTA 250	Hard (i)	(Croatia) Donna Vekić	6–7^{(3–7)}, 2–6
Win	3–1	Jan 2025	Auckland Open, New Zealand	WTA 250	Hard	(Japan) Naomi Osaka	4–6, ret
Loss	3–2	Feb 2025	Dubai Championships, UAE	WTA 1000	Hard	Mirra Andreeva	6–7^{(1–7)}, 1–6

== WTA 125 finals ==
=== Singles: 4 (1 title, 3 runner-ups) ===
Result	W–L	Date	Tournament	Surface	Opponent	Score
Win	1–0	Aug 2021	Chicago Challenger, United States	Hard	(United Kingdom) Emma Raducanu	6–1, 2–6, 6–4
Loss	1–1	Dec 2022	Open de Limoges, France	Hard (i)	(Ukraine) Anhelina Kalinina	3–6, 7–5, 4–6
Loss	1–2	Apr 2024	Oeiras Ladies Open, Portugal	Clay	(Netherlands) Suzan Lamens	4–6, 7–5, 4–6
Loss	1–3	Oct 2024	Hong Kong 125 Open, Hong Kong	Hard	(Australia) Ajla Tomljanović	6–4, 4–6, 4–6

== ITF Circuit finals ==
=== Singles: 15 (11 titles, 4 runner–ups) ===
Legend W60 tournaments (3–0) W40 tournaments (0–1) W25 tournaments (4–1) W15 tournaments (4–2)	Finals by surface Hard (8–2) Clay (1–2) Carpet (2–0)

Result	W–L	Date	Tournament	Tier	Surface	Opponent	Score
Loss	0–1	Oct 2017	ITF Stockholm, Sweden	W15	Hard (i)	(Sweden) Jacqueline Awad	4–6, 0–6
Win	1–1	Nov 2017	ITF Stockholm, Sweden	W15	Hard (i)	(Russia) Ekaterina Yashina	6–3, 6–2
Win	2–1	Mar 2019	ITF Monastir, Tunisia	W15	Hard	(Netherlands) Arianne Hartono	6–2, 6–1
Win	3–1	Mar 2019	Pingshan Open, China	W60	Hard	(China) Fangzhou Liu	6–4, 6–3
Win	4–1	Mar 2019	ITF Xiamen, China	W15	Hard	(China) Guo Meiqi	2–6, 6–3, 6–2
Loss	4–2	Jun 2019	ITF Kaltenkirchen, Germany	W15	Clay	(Japan) Yuki Naito	6–4, 4–6, 0–6
Loss	4–3	Jun 2019	ITF Darmstadt, Germany	W25	Clay	(Belarus) Olga Govortsova	1–6, 6–7^{(3)}
Win	5–3	Sep 2019	Meitar Open, Israel	W60	Hard	(Germany) Katharina Hobgarski	4–6, 6–3, 6–1
Win	6–3	Feb 2020	GB Pro-Series Glasgow, UK	W25	Hard (i)	(Bulgaria) Viktoriya Tomova	6–4, 6–0
Win	7–3	Aug 2020	ITF Oeiras, Portugal	W15	Clay	(Spain) María Gutiérrez Carrasco	6–3, 6–2
Win	8–3	Jan 2021	ITF Fujairah, UAE	W25	Hard	(Switzerland) Viktorija Golubic	6–0, 4–6, 6–3
Win	9–3	Feb 2021	AK Ladies Open, Germany	W25	Carpet (i)	(Switzerland) Simona Waltert	3–6, 6–1, 6–3
Win	10–3	Dec 2022	ITF Sëlva, Italy	W25	Hard (i)	(United States) Emina Bektas	6–3, 7–5
Win	11–3	Feb 2023	AK Ladies Open, Germany	W60	Carpet (i)	(Belgium) Greet Minnen	7–6^{(5)}, 4–6, 6–2
Loss	11–4	Mar 2023	Branik Maribor Open, Slovenia	W40	Hard (i)	(Japan) Mai Hontama	4–6, 6–3, 4–6

=== Doubles: 1 (runner–up) ===
Legend W25 tournaments (0–1)	Finals by surface Hard (0–1)

Result	Date	Tournament	Tier	Surface	Partner	Opponents	Score
Loss	Feb 2020	GB Pro-Series Glasgow, UK	W25	Hard (i)	(Belgium) Lara Salden	(France) Myrtille Georges (Belgium) Kimberley Zimmermann	6–7^{(2)}, 6–7^{(5)}

== Junior Grand Slam tournament finals ==
=== Singles: 1 (title) ===
Result	Year	Tournament	Surface	Opponent	Score
Win	2019	Australian Open	Hard	(Canada) Leylah Fernandez	6–4, 6–3

== Wins against top 10 players ==
Season	2022	2024	2025	Total
Wins	1	1	4	6

No.	Player	Rk	Event	Surface	Rd	Score	Rk	Years	Ref
1.	(Estonia) Anett Kontaveit	7	Australian Open, Australia	Hard	2R	6–2, 6–4	39	2022	
2.	(Greece) Maria Sakkari	6	Billie Jean King Cup, Portugal	Clay	RR	6–4, 6–4	87	2024	
3.	Aryna Sabalenka	1	Dubai Tennis Championships, UAE	Hard	3R	6–3, 6–2	38	2025	
4.	(United States) Emma Navarro	9	Italian Open, Italy	Clay	3R	3–6, 6–0, 6–4	23	2025	
5.	(Poland) Iga Świątek	3	Canadian Open, Canada	Hard	4R	7–6^{(7–1)}, 6–3	19	2025	
6.	(United States) Madison Keys	8	Canadian Open, Canada	Hard	QF	6–1, 6–4	19	2025	

- Key: (Rk) first use, opponent rank; (Rd) round; (Rk) 2nd use, player rank; (Ref) reference; (F) final; (SF) semifinal; (QF) quarterfinal; (#R) rounds 4, 3, 2, 1; (RR) round-robin stage; (Q#) qualifying rounds or stages (3), 2, 1.

== Billie Jean King Cup / Fed Cup ==
Results for Tauson representing Denmark in Fed/BJK Cup.
Result	Date and place	Round	Surface	Partner	Against	Opponent	Score
Loss	2017, 20 April, Šiauliai, Lithuania	Europe/Africa Group II	Hard (i)	Mai Grage	Egypt	Ola Zekry, Rana Ahmed	6–7^{(5)}, 4–6
Win	2018, 18–21 April, Athens, Greece	Europe/Africa Group II	Clay	(Singles)	Egypt	Lamis Aziz	6–4, 6–2
Loss	2018, 18–21 April, Athens, Greece	Europe/Africa Group II	Clay	(Singles)	Greece	Valentini Grammatikopoulou	7–6^{(3)}, 6–7^{(4)}, 0–6
Win	2018, 18–21 April, Athens, Greece	Promotional Play-off	Clay	(Singles)	Israel	Vlada Ekshibarova	6–2, 6–1
Loss	2019, 6–9 February, Zielona Góra, Poland	Europe/Africa Group I	Hard (i)	(Singles)	Russia	Natalia Vikhlyantseva	6–7^{(3)}, 1–6
Loss	2019, 6–9 February, Zielona Góra, Poland	Europe/Africa Group I	Hard (i)	(Singles)	Poland	Iga Świątek	3–6, 6–7^{(7)}
Win	2020, 4–7 February, Helsinki, Finland	Europe/Africa Group II	Hard (i)	(Singles)	Finland	Oona Orpana	6–4, 6–2
Win	2020, 4–7 February, Helsinki, Finland	Europe/Africa Group II	Hard (i)	(Singles)	Portugal	Francisca Jorge	6–1, 6–1
Win	2020, 4–7 February, Helsinki, Finland	Europe/Africa Group II	Hard (i)	(Singles)	Egypt	Mayar Sherif	6–1, 6–1
Loss	2020, 4–7 February, Helsinki, Finland	Promotional Play-off	Hard (i)	(Singles)	Tunisia	Ons Jabeur	4–6, 4–6
Win	2023, 10–15 April, Gainbridge, United Kingdom	Europe/Africa Group B	Hard (i)	(Singles)	Bulgaria	Gergana Topalova	6–3, 6–1
Win	2023, 10–15 April, Gainbridge, United Kingdom	Europe/Africa Group B	Hard (i)	(Singles)	Sweden	Rebecca Peterson	2–6, 6–2, 6–4
Win	2023, 10–15 April, Gainbridge, United Kingdom	Europe/Africa Group B	Hard (i)	(Singles)	Croatia	Antonia Ruzic	7–6^{(6)}, 6–1
Win	2023, 10–15 April, Gainbridge, United Kingdom	Relegation Play-off	Hard (i)	(Singles)	Egypt	Sandra Samir	6–3, 6–3
Win	2024, 8–13 April, Oeiras, Portugal	Europe/Africa Group I	Clay	(Singles)	Austria	Julia Grabher	6–2, 6–3
Win	2024, 8–13 April, Oeiras, Portugal	Europe/Africa Group I	Clay	(Singles)	Bulgaria	Viktoriya Tomova	6–4, 6–2
Win	2024, 8–13 April, Oeiras, Portugal	Europe/Africa Group I	Clay	(Singles)	Hungary	Natalia Szabanin	6–0, 6–0
Win	2024, 8–13 April, Oeiras, Portugal	Promotional Play-off	Clay	(Singles)	Greece	Maria Sakkari	6–4, 6–4
Win	2024, 8–13 April, Oeiras, Portugal	Promotional Play-off	Clay	(Singles)	Latvia	Darja Semenistaja	6–1^{ret.}
Win	2024, 15–16 November, Farum, Denmark	Play-off for 2025 qualifying round	Hard (i)	(Singles)	Mexico	Giuliana Olmos	6–4, 6–2
Loss	2024, 15–16 November, Farum, Denmark	Play-off for 2025 qualifying round	Hard (i)	(Singles)	Mexico	Renata Zarazua	6–7, 6–3, 5–7
Win	2024, 15–16 November, Farum, Denmark	Play-off for 2025 qualifying round	Hard (i)	Emilie Francati	Mexico	Giuliana Olmos/ Renata Zarazua	2–6, 6–4, 6–4

== Hopman Cup ==
Results for Tauson representing Denmark in Hopman Cup
Result	Date and place	Round	Surface	Partner	Against	Opponent	Score
Win	2023, 19–20 July, Nice, France	Preliminary	Clay	(Singles)	Switzerland	Céline Naef	6–2, 6–3
Loss	2023, 19–20 July, Nice, France	Preliminary	Clay	Holger Rune	Switzerland	Céline Naef / Leandro Riedi	3–6, 5–7
Win	2023, 19–20 July, Nice, France	Preliminary	Clay	(Singles)	France	Alizé Cornet	7–6^{(2)}, 6–4
Loss	2023, 19–20 July, Nice, France	Preliminary	Clay	Holger Rune	France	Alizé Cornet / Richard Gasquet	4–6, 4–6
