= Oona Orpana =

Finnish tennis player

- Country (sports): Finland
- Residence: Helsinki, Finland
- Born: 21 January 2001 (age 25) Hamina, Finland
- Plays: Right (two-handed backhand)
- Prize money: US$ 28,641

Singles
- Career record: 79–43
- Career titles: 1 ITF
- Highest ranking: No. 479 (3 February 2020)
- Current ranking: No. 705 (21 February 2022)

Doubles
- Career record: 44–26
- Career titles: 4 ITF
- Highest ranking: No. 478 (19 August 2019)
- Current ranking: No. 767 (21 February 2022)

Team competitions
- Fed Cup: 7–7
- Last updated on: 16 October 2021.

Oona Orpana (born 21 January 2001) is a Finnish professional tennis player.

On the ITF Junior Circuit, she has a career-high ranking of 41, achieved on 26 February 2018.

Orpana won Finnish outdoor and indoor singles championship in 2016, and outdoor singles again in 2019 and 2021. On 29 June 2019, she won her first national doubles title (with Venla Ahti). The pair also won the national outdoor title in 2021. On national level her team is Smash-Kotka. Previously with HVS (Helsinki).

In the 2019 season, she was mainly coached by Zdenek Kubik at Prague, that was her main base in 2019. Ville-Petteri Ahti is her hitting partner/coach at Finland weeks. Her playing/training/traveling budget for 2019 was over 100,000 Euro.

In November 2019, she was awarded "Female Tennis Player of the Year" in Finland.

In autumn 2021, she moved to United States, and now represents Oklahoma State University.

Playing for the Finland Fed Cup team, Orpana has a win–loss record of 7–7.

== ITF Circuit finals ==
=== Singles: 6 (1 title, 4 runner–ups, 1 did not play) ===
Legend
$15,000 tournaments

Result	W–L	Date	Tournament	Tier	Surface	Opponent	Score
Win	1–0	Oct 2018	ITF Antalya, Turkey	15,000	Hard	(Sweden) Alexandra Viktorovitch	6–3, 2–6, 7–5
DNP	—N/a	Dec 2018	ITF Antalya, Turkey	15,000	Hard	(Ukraine) Daria Snigur	cancelled (Note: Singles and doubles competition cancelled due to bad weather)
Loss	1–1	Feb 2019	ITF Sharm El Sheikh, Egypt	15,000	Hard	(Switzerland) Simona Waltert	1–6, 3–6
Loss	1–2	Mar 2019	ITF Sharm El Sheikh, Egypt	15,000	Hard	(Ukraine) Daria Snigur	6–3, 3–6, 4–6
Loss	1–3	Oct 2019	ITF Sozopol, Bulgaria	15,000	Hard	(Bulgaria) Petia Arshinkova	0–6, 4–6
Loss	1–4	Dec 2019	ITF Antalya, Turkey	15,000	Hard	(North Macedonia) Lina Gjorcheska	4–6, 7–6^{(5)}, 1–6

=== Doubles: 9 (4 titles, 5 runner–ups) ===
Legend
$15,000 tournaments

Result	W–L	Date	Tournament	Tier	Surface	Partner	Opponents	Score
Loss	0–1	Oct 2017	ITF Nonthaburi, Thailand	15,000	Hard	(Malta) Elaine Genovese	(Thailand) Nudnida Luangnam (Thailand) Varunya Wongteanchai	4–6, 4–6
Loss	0–2	Sep 2018	ITF Antalya, Turkey	15,000	Hard	(Latvia) Alise Cernecka	(Turkey) Melis Sezer (Turkey) Cemre Anıl	2–6, 5–7
Win	1–2	Oct 2018	ITF Antalya, Turkey	15,000	Hard	(Latvia) Alise Cernecka	(Sweden) Alexandra Viktorovitch (Sweden) Lisa Zaar	6–4, 7–6^{(6)}
Win	2–2	Nov 2018	ITF Stockholm, Sweden	15,000	Hard (i)	(Russia) Anna Makhorkina	(Sweden) Anette Munozova (Germany) Shaline-Doreen Pipa	w/o
DNP	—N/a	Dec 2018	ITF Antalya, Turkey	15,000	Hard	(Latvia) Alise Cernecka	(Russia) Evgenia Burdina (Russia) Ekaterina Ovcharenko	6–1, 0–1 canc. (Note: Doubles final cancelled due to bad weather)
Win	3–2	Feb 2019	ITF Sharm El Sheikh, Egypt	15,000	Hard	(Czech Republic) Anastasia Dețiuc	(Norway) Malene Helgø (Croatia) Mariana Dražić	6–0, 6–4
Loss	3–3	Oct 2019	ITF Stockholm, Sweden	15,000	Hard (i)	(Sweden) Jacqueline Cabaj Awad	(Sweden) Fanny Östlund (Russia) Alina Silich	3–6, 2–6
Loss	3–4	Nov 2019	ITF Stockholm, Sweden	15,000	Hard (i)	(Sweden) Jacqueline Cabaj Awad	(Latvia) Margarita Ignatjeva (Russia) Ekaterina Kazionova	6–2, 6–7^{(5)}, [4–10]
Loss	3–5	Jan 2020	ITF Monastir, Tunisia	15,000	Hard	(France) Mallaurie Noël	(Slovakia) Tereza Mihalíková (United Kingdom) Jodie Anna Burrage	1–6, 2–6
Win	4–5	Oct 2021	ITF Norman, United States	15,000	Hard	(Italy) Martina Zerulo	(United States) McKenna Schaefbauer (Dominican Republic) Kelly Williford	6–2, 5–7 [10–6]

== National representation ==
=== Fed Cup ===
Orpana made her Fed Cup debut for Finland in 2015, while the team was competing in the Europe/Africa Zone Group II, when she was 14 years and 15 days old. This made her the youngest Fed Cup player in Finland's history.

Group membership World Group (0–0) World Group Play-off (0–0) World Group II (0–0) World Group II Play-off (0–0) Europe/Africa Group (7–7)	Matches by surface Hard (4–6) Clay (3–1) Grass (0–0) Carpet (0–0)	Matches by type Singles (5–5) Doubles (2–2)	Matches by setting Indoors (4–6) Outdoors (3–1)

==== Singles (5–5) ====
Edition	Stage	Date	Location	Against	Surface	Opponent	W/L	Score
2015 Fed Cup; Europe/Africa Zone Group II	Pool B	5 February 2015	Tallinn, Estonia	Slovenia	Hard (i)	Tadeja Majerič	L	6–7^{(5–7)}, 5–7
2015 Fed Cup; Europe/Africa Zone Group II	Pool B	6 February 2015	Tallinn, Estonia	Luxembourg	Hard (i)	Eléonora Molinaro	W	7–5, 6–4
2017 Fed Cup; Europe/Africa Zone Group III	Pool C	14 June 2017	Chișinău, Moldova	Cameroon	Clay	Linda Claire Éloundou	W	6–0, 6–0
2017 Fed Cup; Europe/Africa Zone Group III	Pool C	15 June 2017	Chișinău, Moldova	Tunisia	Clay	Chiraz Bechri	W	6–3, 6–2
2017 Fed Cup; Europe/Africa Zone Group III	Pool C	16 June 2017	Chișinău, Moldova	(North Macedonia) Macedonia	Clay	Viktorija Veselinova	W	6–1, 6–0
2017 Fed Cup; Europe/Africa Zone Group III	Promotional Play-off	17 June 2017	Chișinău, Moldova	Greece	Clay	Eleni Kordolaimi	L	0–6, 4–6
2020 Fed Cup; Europe/Africa Zone Group II	Pool B	4 February 2020	Helsinki, Finland	Denmark	Hard (i)	Clara Tauson	L	4–6, 6–7^{(5–7)}
2020 Fed Cup; Europe/Africa Zone Group II	Pool B	5 February 2020	Helsinki, Finland	Egypt	Hard (i)	Mayar Sherif	W	6–4, 6–2
2020 Fed Cup; Europe/Africa Zone Group II	Pool B	6 February 2020	Helsinki, Finland	Portugal	Hard (i)	Francisca Jorge	L	3–6, 3–6
2020 Fed Cup; Europe/Africa Zone Group II	Promotional Play-off	7 February 2020	Helsinki, Finland	(Georgia (country)) Georgia	Hard (i)	Mariam Bolkvadze	L	5–7, 4–6

==== Doubles (2–2) ====
Edition	Stage	Date	Location	Against	Surface	Partner	Opponents	W/L	Score
2015 Fed Cup; Europe/Africa Zone Group II	Pool B	5 February 2015	Tallinn, Estonia	Slovenia	Hard (i)	Roosa Timonen	Andreja Klepač; Manca Pislak	L	1–6, 1–6
2020 Fed Cup; Europe/Africa Zone Group II	Pool B	4 February 2020	Helsinki, Finland	Denmark	Hard (i)	Anastasia Kulikova	Emilie Francati; Maria Jespersen	L	4–6, 4–6
2020 Fed Cup; Europe/Africa Zone Group II	Pool B	5 February 2020	Helsinki, Finland	Egypt	Hard (i)	Laura Hietaranta	Rana Sherif Ahmed; Mayar Sherif	W	7–6^{(8–6)}, 6–4
2020 Fed Cup; Europe/Africa Zone Group II	Pool B	6 February 2020	Helsinki, Finland	Portugal	Hard (i)	Laura Hietaranta	Maria Inês Fonte; Francisca Jorge	W	7–6^{(7–5)}, 1–6, 7–6^{(7–2)}

== Notes ==
Sporting positions
Preceded by Mia Eklund	Finland Female Tennis Player of the Year; 2019	Succeeded by Incumbent
