= 2020 Billie Jean King Cup Europe/Africa Zone Group II – play-offs =

Subsection of tennis competition

The play-offs of the 2020 Billie Jean King Cup Europe/Africa Zone Group II were the final stages of the Group II zonal competition involving teams from Europe and Africa. Using the positions determined in their pools, the eight teams faced off to determine their placing in the 2020 Billie Jean King Cup Europe/Africa Zone Group II. The top two teams advanced to Group I, and the bottom two teams were relegated down to the Group III for 2022.

== Pool results ==
Placing	Pool A	Pool B
1	Georgia	Denmark
2	Tunisia	Finland
3	Israel	Egypt
4	Moldova	Portugal

== Promotional play-offs ==
The first-placed teams of each pool played against the second-placed teams of the other pool in head-to-head rounds. The winner of each round advanced to the 2022 Europe/Africa Zone Group I.

=== Georgia vs. Finland ===
Georgia
2
Tali Tennis Center, Helsinki, Finland
7 February 2020
Hard (indoor)

Finland
1

			1	2	3
1	(Georgia (country)) (Finland)	Ekaterine Gorgodze; Anastasia Kulikova	2; 6	4; 6
2	(Georgia (country)) (Finland)	Mariam Bolkvadze; Oona Orpana	7; 5	6; 4
3	(Georgia (country)) (Finland)	Ekaterine Gorgodze / Oksana Kalashnikova; Laura Hietaranta / Oona Orpana	6; 4	6; 3

=== Denmark vs. Tunisia ===
Denmark
2
Tali Tennis Center, Helsinki, Finland
7 February 2020
Hard (indoor)

Tunisia
1

			1	2	3
1	(Denmark) (Tunisia)	Karen Barritza; Chiraz Bechri	6; 1	6; 4
2	(Denmark) (Tunisia)	Clara Tauson; Ons Jabeur	4; 6	4; 6
3	(Denmark) (Tunisia)	Emilie Francati / Maria Jespersen; Chiraz Bechri / Ons Jabeur	1; 6	6; 2	6; 4

== Relegation play-offs ==
The third-placed and fourth-placed teams of the pools played against each other in a head-to-head round. The losers were relegated to the 2022 Europe/Africa Zone Group III.

=== Israel vs. Portugal ===
Israel
2
Tali Tennis Center, Helsinki, Finland
7 February 2020
Hard (indoor)

Portugal
0

			1	2	3
1	(Israel) (Portugal)	Shelly Bereznyak; Maria Inês Fonte	6; 3	6; 2
2	(Israel) (Portugal)	Lina Glushko; Francisca Jorge	6; 4	6; 0
3	(Israel) (Portugal)	Lina Glushko / Shavit Kimchi; Maria Inês Fonte / Francisca Jorge				not played

=== Egypt vs. Moldova ===
Egypt
2
Tali Tennis Center, Helsinki, Finland
7 February 2020
Hard (indoor)

Moldova
0

			1	2	3
1	(Egypt) (Moldova)	Sandra Samir; Daniela Ciobanu	6; 1	7; 5
2	(Egypt) (Moldova)	Mayar Sherif; Anastasia Vdovenco	6; 4	1; 6	7^{7} 6^{5}
3	(Egypt) (Moldova)	Rana Sherif Ahmed / Mayar Sherif; Daniela Ciobanu / Anastasia Vdovenco				not played

== Final placements ==
Placing	Teams	
Promoted/First	Georgia	Denmark
Third	Finland	Tunisia
Fifth	Israel	Egypt
Relegated/Seventh	Portugal	Moldova

- Georgia and Denmark were promoted to Europe/Africa Zone Group I in 2022.
- Portugal and Moldova were relegated to Europe/Africa Zone Group III in 2022.
