= 2020 Billie Jean King Cup Europe/Africa Zone Group II – Pool B =

Subsection of tennis competition

Pool B of the 2020 Billie Jean King Cup Europe/Africa Zone Group II was one of four pools in the Europe/Africa zone of the 2020–21 Billie Jean King Cup. Four teams competed in a round robin competition, with the top teams and the bottom teams proceeding to their respective sections of the play-offs: the top team played for advancement to Group I.

== Standings ==
		DEN	FIN	EGY	POR	RR; W–L	Set; W–L	Game; W–L	Standings
2	Denmark		2–1	1–2	3–0	6–3	13–6 (68%)	102–68 (60%)	1
6	Finland	1–2		3–0	2–1	6–3	12–8 (60%)	102–89 (53%)	2
7	Egypt	2–1	0–3		2–1	4–5	9–12 (43%)	91–112 (45%)	3
4	Portugal	0–3	1–2	1–2		2–7	7–15 (32%)	88–114 (44%)	4

Standings are determined by: 1. number of wins; 2. number of matches; 3. in two-team ties, head-to-head records; 4. in three-team ties, (a) percentage of matches won (head-to-head records if two teams remain tied), then (b) percentage of sets won (head-to-head records if two teams remain tied), then (c) percentage of games won (head-to-head records if two teams remain tied), then (d) Billie Jean King Cup rankings.

== Round-robin ==
=== Denmark vs. Finland ===
Denmark
2
Tali Tennis Centre, Helsinki, Finland
4 February 2020
Hard (indoors)

Finland
1

			1	2	3
1	(Denmark) (Finland)	Karen Barritza; Anastasia Kulikova	6; 2	3; 6	3; 6
2	(Denmark) (Finland)	Clara Tauson; Oona Orpana	6; 4	7^{7} 6^{5}
3	(Denmark) (Finland)	Emilie Francati / Maria Jespersen; Anastasia Kulikova / Oona Orpana	6; 4	6; 4

=== Portugal vs. Egypt ===
Portugal
1
Tali Tennis Centre, Helsinki, Finland
4 February 2020
Hard (indoors)

Egypt
2

			1	2	3
1	(Portugal) (Egypt)	Maria Inês Fonte; Sandra Samir	6; 4	4; 6	2; 6
2	(Portugal) (Egypt)	Francisca Jorge; Mayar Sherif	7^{7} 6^{5}	4; 6	6^{6} 7^{8}
3	(Portugal) (Egypt)	Matilde Jorge / Inês Murta; Mai El Kamash / Rana Sherif Ahmed	6; 2	5; 7	6; 1

=== Denmark vs. Portugal ===
Denmark
3
Tali Tennis Centre, Helsinki, Finland
5 February 2020
Hard (indoors)

Portugal
0

			1	2	3
1	(Denmark) (Portugal)	Karen Barritza; Inês Murta	6; 1	6; 0
2	(Denmark) (Portugal)	Clara Tauson; Francisca Jorge	6; 1	6; 1
3	(Denmark) (Portugal)	Emilie Francati / Maria Jespersen; Francisca Jorge / Matilde Jorge	6; 4	6; 2

=== Finland vs. Egypt ===
Finland
3
Tali Tennis Centre, Helsinki, Finland
5 February 2020
Hard (indoors)

Egypt
0

			1	2	3
1	(Finland) (Egypt)	Anastasia Kulikova; Sandra Samir	6; 1	6; 2
2	(Finland) (Egypt)	Oona Orpana; Mayar Sherif	6; 4	6; 2
3	(Finland) (Egypt)	Laura Hietaranta / Oona Orpana; Rana Sherif Ahmed / Mayar Sherif	7^{8} 6^{6}	6; 4

=== Denmark vs. Egypt ===
Denmark
1
Tali Tennis Centre, Helsinki, Finland
6 February 2020
Hard (indoors)

Egypt
2

			1	2	3
1	(Denmark) (Egypt)	Karen Barritza; Sandra Samir	3; 6	6^{7} 7^{9}
2	(Denmark) (Egypt)	Clara Tauson; Mayar Sherif	6; 1	6; 1
3	(Denmark) (Egypt)	Emilie Francati / Maria Jespersen; Rana Sherif Ahmed / Mayar Sherif	4; 6	4; 6

=== Portugal vs. Finland ===
Portugal
1
Tali Tennis Centre, Helsinki, Finland
6 February 2020
Hard (indoors)

Finland
2

			1	2	3
1	(Portugal) (Finland)	Maria Inês Fonte; Anastasia Kulikova	0; 6	3; 6
2	(Portugal) (Finland)	Francisca Jorge; Oona Orpana	6; 3	6; 3
3	(Portugal) (Finland)	Maria Inês Fonte / Francisca Jorge; Laura Hietaranta / Oona Orpana	6^{5} 7^{7}	6; 1	6^{2} 7^{7}
