= 2017 Fed Cup Europe/Africa Zone Group III – Pool C =

Subsection of tennis competition

Pool C of the 2017 Fed Cup Europe/Africa Group III was one of four pools in the Europe/Africa Group III of the 2017 Fed Cup. Four teams competed in a round robin competition, with the top team and bottom teams proceeding to their respective section of the play-offs: the top team played for advancement to Group II.

== Standings ==
		FIN	TUN	MKD	CMR	RR; W–L	Set; W–L	Game; W–L	Standings
73	Finland		2–1	3–0	3–0	3–0	17–3 (85%)	111–51 (69%)	1
89	Tunisia	1–2		3–0	3–0	2–1	15–6 (71%)	111–66 (63%)	2
77	Macedonia	0–3	0–3		3–0	1–2	7–12 (39%)	67–82 (45%)	3
NR	Cameroon	0–3	0–3	0–3		0–3	0–18 (0%)	18–108 (14%)	4

Standings are determined by: 1. number of wins; 2. if two teams have the same number of wins, head-to-head record; 3. if three teams have the same number of wins, (a) number of matches won in the group, then (b) percentage of sets won in the group, then (c) percentage of games won in the group, then (d) Fed Cup rankings.

== Round-robin ==
=== Finland vs. Cameroon ===
Finland
3
National Tennis School & Tennis Club Acvila, Chișinău, Moldova
14 June 2017
Clay

Cameroon
0

			1	2	3
1	(Finland) (Cameroon)	Oona Orpana; Linda Claire Eloundou Nga	6; 0	6; 0
2	(Finland) (Cameroon)	Mia Eklund; Manuella Peguy Eloundou Nga	6; 1	6; 1
3	(Finland) (Cameroon)	Mia Eklund / Emma Laine; Linda Claire Eloundou Nga / Manuella Peguy Eloundou Nga	6; 1	6; 2

=== Macedonia vs. Tunisia ===
North Macedonia
0
National Tennis School & Tennis Club Acvila, Chișinău, Moldova
14 June 2017
Clay

Tunisia
3

			1	2	3
1	(North Macedonia) (Tunisia)	Nora Hristovska; Chiraz Bechri	2; 6	3; 6
2	(North Macedonia) (Tunisia)	Katarina Marinkovikj; Ons Jabeur	1; 6	2; 1		retired
3	(North Macedonia) (Tunisia)	Nora Hristovska / Viktorija Veselinova; Chiraz Bechri / Mouna Bouzgarrou	4; 6	6; 4	2; 6

=== Finland vs. Tunisia ===
Finland
2
National Tennis School & Tennis Club Acvila, Chișinău, Moldova
15 June 2017
Clay

Tunisia
1

			1	2	3
1	(Finland) (Tunisia)	Oona Orpana; Chiraz Bechri	6; 3	6; 2
2	(Finland) (Tunisia)	Piia Suomalainen; Ons Jabeur	1; 6	6; 4	1; 6
3	(Finland) (Tunisia)	Emma Laine / Piia Suomalainen; Chiraz Bechri / Ons Jabeur	7; 5	6^{5} 7^{7}	6; 2

=== Macedonia vs. Cameroon ===
North Macedonia
3
National Tennis School & Tennis Club Acvila, Chișinău, Moldova
15 June 2017
Clay

Cameroon
0

			1	2	3
1	(North Macedonia) (Cameroon)	Viktorija Veselinova; Venus Mirande Ngone Hagal	6; 1	6; 0
2	(North Macedonia) (Cameroon)	Nora Hristovska; Manuella Peguy Eloundou Nga	6; 2	6; 2
3	(North Macedonia) (Cameroon)	Nora Hristovska / Viktorija Veselinova; Linda Claire Eloundou Nga / Manuella Peguy Eloundou Nga	6; 1	6; 0

=== Finland vs. Macedonia ===
Finland
3
National Tennis School & Tennis Club Acvila, Chișinău, Moldova
16 June 2017
Clay

North Macedonia
0

			1	2	3
1	(Finland) (North Macedonia)	Oona Orpana; Viktorija Veselinova	6; 1	6; 0
2	(Finland) (North Macedonia)	Mia Eklund; Nora Hristovska	6; 2	6; 2
3	(Finland) (North Macedonia)	Mia Eklund / Emma Laine; Nora Hristovska / Viktorija Veselinova	6; 4	6; 2

=== Tunisia vs. Cameroon ===
Tunisia
3
National Tennis School & Tennis Club Acvila, Chișinău, Moldova
16 June 2017
Clay

Cameroon
0

			1	2	3
1	(Tunisia) (Cameroon)	Mouna Bouzgarrou; Venus Mirande Ngone Hagal	6; 2	6; 0
2	(Tunisia) (Cameroon)	Chiraz Bechri; Linda Claire Eloundou Nga	6; 0	6; 2
3	(Tunisia) (Cameroon)	Chiraz Bechri / Mouna Bouzgarrou; Linda Claire Eloundou Nga / Venus Mirande Ngone Hagal	6; 1	6; 2

== See also ==
- Fed Cup structure
