= 2018 Fed Cup Europe/Africa Zone Group II – Pool A =

Subsection of tennis competition

Group A of the 2018 Fed Cup Europe/Africa Zone Group II was one of two pools in the Europe/Africa zone of the 2018 Fed Cup. Three teams competed in a round robin competition, with the top two teams and the bottom team proceeding to their respective sections of the play-offs: the top two teams played for advancement to Group I, while the bottom team faced potential relegation to Group III.

== Standings ==
| | | GRE | DEN | EGY | RR; W–L | Set; W–L | Game; W–L | Standings |
| 5 | Greece | | 2–1 | 2–1 | 2–0 | 9–5 (64%) | 75–48 (61%) | 1 |
| 1 | Denmark | 1–2 | | 3–0 | 1–1 | 9–5 (64%) | 70–63 (53%) | 2 |
| 3 | Egypt | 1–2 | 0–3 | | 0–2 | 3–11 (21%) | 41–75 (35%) | 3 |

Standings are determined by: 1. number of wins; 2. if two teams have the same number of wins, head-to-head record; 3. if three teams have the same number of wins, (a) number of matches won in the group, then (b) percentage of sets won in the group, then (c) percentage of games won in the group, then (d) Fed Cup rankings.

== Round-robin ==
=== Denmark vs. Egypt ===
Denmark
3
Tatoi Club, Athens, Greece
18 April
Clay

Egypt
0

| | | | 1 | 2 | 3 |
|---|---|---|---|---|---|
| 1 | (Denmark) (Egypt) | Clara Tauson; Lamis Alhussein Abdel Aziz | 6; 4 | 6; 2 |
| 2 | (Denmark) (Egypt) | Karen Barritza; Sandra Samir | 7; 5 | 4; 6 | 6; 2 |
| 3 | (Denmark) (Egypt) | Emilie Francati / Maria Jespersen; Dona Abo Habaga / Rana Sherif Ahmed | 6; 0 | 6; 3 |

=== Egypt vs. Greece ===
Egypt
1
Tatoi Club, Athens, Greece
19 April
Clay

Greece
2

| | | | 1 | 2 | 3 |
|---|---|---|---|---|---|
| 1 | (Egypt) (Greece) | Dona Abo Habaga; Valentini Grammatikopoulou | 2; 6 | 3; 6 |
| 2 | (Egypt) (Greece) | Sandra Samir; Maria Sakkari | 0; 6 | 0; 6 |
| 3 | (Egypt) (Greece) | Sandra Samir / Rana Sherif Ahmed; Valentini Grammatikopoulou / Maria Sakkari | 6; 1 | 2; 6 | 6; 3 |

=== Denmark vs. Greece ===
Denmark
1
Tatoi Club, Athens, Greece
20 April
Clay

Greece
2

| | | | 1 | 2 | 3 |
|---|---|---|---|---|---|
| 1 | (Denmark) (Greece) | Clara Tauson; Valentini Grammatikopoulou | 7^{7} 6^{3} | 6^{4} 7^{7} | 0; 6 |
| 2 | (Denmark) (Greece) | Karen Barritza; Maria Sakkari | 0; 6 | 3; 6 |
| 3 | (Denmark) (Greece) | Emilie Francati / Maria Jespersen; Emmanouela Antonakis / Eleni Kordolaimi | 6; 4 | 7^{7} 6^{3} |
