= Manca Pislak =

Slovenian tennis player

- Country (sports): Slovenia
- Residence: Ljubljana, Slovenia
- Born: 9 September 1997 (age 29) Ljubljana
- Plays: Left (two-handed backhand)
- Prize money: $47,047

Singles
- Career record: 227–147
- Career titles: 3 ITF
- Highest ranking: No. 500 (3 April 2017)
- Current ranking: No. 1,172 (25 May 2026)

Doubles
- Career record: 57–59
- Career titles: 4 ITF
- Highest ranking: No. 595 (15 July 2019)
- Current ranking: No. 1,299 (25 May 2026)

Team competitions
- Fed Cup: 3–0
- Last updated on: 2 June 2026.

Manca Pislak (born 9 September 1997) is a Slovenian tennis player.

On 3 April 2017, she achieved a career-high singles ranking of world No. 500. Pislac has won three singles and four doubles titles on the ITF Women's Circuit.

Playing for the Slovenia Fed Cup team, she has a win–loss record of 3–0.

== Career highlights ==
=== Juniors ===
Pislak reached a career-high juniors ranking of 52, achieved on 2 February 2015.

== ITF Circuit finals ==
=== Singles: 6 (3 titles, 3 runner-ups) ===
Legend W25/35 tournaments W10/15 tournaments	Finals by surface Clay (2–3) Carpet (1–0)

Result	W–L	Date	Tournament	Tier	Surface	Opponent	Score
Loss	0–1	Jun 2016	ITF Maribor, Slovenia	10k	Clay	(Serbia) Milana Špremo	6–7^{(4)}, 6–0, 2–6
Loss	0–2	Jul 2016	ITF Banja Luka, Bosnia & Herzegovina	10k	Clay	(Slovakia) Viktória Kužmová	0–6, 1–6
Win	1–2	Aug 2016	ITF Tarvisio, Italy	10k	Clay	(Italy) Federica Bilardo	6–1, 6–0
Win	2–2	Oct 2018	ITF Cantanhede, Portugal	15k	Carpet	(France) Carole Monnet	6–2, 6–1
Win	3–2	Apr 2019	ITF Antalya, Turkey	W15	Clay	(Belarus) Anna Kubareva	6–4, 2–6, 6–4
Loss	3–3	Jul 2019	ITF Schio, Italy	W15	Clay	(Colombia) Yuliana Lizarazo	4–6, 5–7

=== Doubles: 10 (4 titles, 6 runner-ups) ===
Legend W25/35 tournaments W10/15 tournaments	Finals by surface Clay (3–3) Carpet (1–3)

Result	W–L	Date	Tournament	Tier	Surface	Partner	Opponents	Score
Loss	0–1	Aug 2015	ITF Koper, Slovenia	10k	Clay	(Slovakia) Jana Jablonovská	(Argentina) Julieta Lara Estable (Slovakia) Barbara Kötelesová	6–3, 5–7, [7–10]
Loss	0–2	Jun 2016	ITF Velenje, Slovenia	10k	Clay	(Slovenia) Polona Reberšak	(Czech Republic) Gabriela Pantůčková (Czech Republic) Magdaléna Pantůčková	6–4, 6–7^{(0)}, [11–13]
Loss	0–3	Jun 2016	ITF Maribor, Slovenia	10k	Clay	(Slovenia) Polona Reberšak	(Slovenia) Sara Palčič (Slovenia) Nina Potočnik	3–6, 2–6
Win	1–3	Jun 2016	ITF Banja Luka, Bosnia & Herzegovina	10k	Clay	(Slovakia) Barbara Kötelesová	(Slovakia) Viktória Kužmová (Bulgaria) Julia Stamatova	6–7^{(5)}, 6–4, [10–5]
Loss	1–4	Jul 2018	ITF Imola, Italy	25k	Carpet	(Italy) Claudia Giovine	(Italy) Federica di Sarra (Italy) Giorgia Marchetti	3–6, 1–6
Win	2–4	Oct 2018	ITF Cantanhede, Portugal	15k	Carpet	(Germany) Katharina Hering	(Portugal) Francisca Jorge (United Kingdom) Anna Popescu	6–4, 2–6, [10–8]
Loss	2–5	Nov 2018	ITF Solarino, Italy	15k	Carpet	(Italy) Maria Masini	(France) Lou Adler (Bolivia) Noelia Zeballos	6–2, 4–6, [6–10]
Win	3–5	May 2019	ITF Antalya, Turkey	W15	Clay	(Hungary) Vanda Lukács	(India) Jennifer Luikham (Japan) Ramu Ueda	7–5, 5–7, [10–6]
Win	4–5	May 2022	ITF Krško, Slovenia	W15	Clay	(Czech Republic) Aneta Kučmová	Victoria Borodulina (United Kingdom) Sashi Kempster	6–1, 6–2
Loss	4–6	Oct 2024	ITF Bol, Croatia	W15	Clay	Victoria Borodulina	(Slovakia) Laura Svatíková (Romania) Arina Gabriela Vasilescu	2–6, 1–6

== ITF Junior Circuit finals ==
Category G1
Category G2
Category G3
Category G4
Category G5

=== Singles (1–1) ===
Outcome	No.	Date	Tournament	Grade	Surface	Opponent	Score
Winner	1.	8 December 2012	Zagreb, Croatia	G4	Hard (i)	(Slovenia) Eva Zagorac	6–2, 7–6^{(2)}
Runner-up	1.	25 August 2013	Kranj, Slovenia	G4	Clay	(Slovakia) Tereza Mihalíková	6–2, 4–6, 6–7^{(5)}

=== Doubles (4–4) ===
Outcome	No.	Date	Tournament	Grade	Surface	Partner	Opponents	Score
Runner-up	1.	3 November 2012	Budapest, Hungary	G4	Clay (i)	(Slovenia) Hana Mraz	(Hungary) Anna Bondár (Hungary) Dalma Gálfi	1–6, 2–6
Runner-up	2.	8 December 2012	Zagreb, Croatia	G4	Hard (i)	(Serbia) Bojana Marinković	(Hungary) Anna Bondár (Hungary) Alexa Pirók	6–7^{(5)}, 4–6
Winner	1.	11 May 2013	Villach, Austria	G2	Clay	(Slovakia) Katarína Strešnáková	(Kazakhstan) Alexandra Grinchishina (Russia) Veronika Miroshnichenko	6–3, 6–4
Winner	2.	1 September 2013	Maribor, Slovenia	G4	Clay	(Slovenia) Tamara Zidanšek	(Austria) Jasmin Buchta (Austria) Alena Weiss	6–1, 6–2
Winner	3.	16 November 2013	Bat Yam, Israel	G3	Hard	(Slovakia) Katarína Strešnáková	(Russia) Anna Pribylova (Slovenia) Tamara Zidanšek	6–4, 6–0
Runner-up	3.	27 April 2014	Beaulieu-sur-Mer, France	G1	Clay	(Slovenia) Nina Potočnik	(China) Ye Qiuyu (China) You Xiaodi	6–7^{(6)}, 3–6
Runner-up	4.	10 May 2014	Villach, Austria	G2	Clay	(Slovenia) Tamara Zidanšek	(Slovakia) Jana Jablonovská (Czech Republic) Miriam Kolodziejová	4–6, 2–6
Winner	4.	20 July 2014	Linz, Austria	G1	Clay	(Slovenia) Tamara Zidanšek	(Australia) Maddison Inglis (France) Emmanuelle Salas	6–1, 3–6, [10–4]

== National representation ==
=== Fed Cup ===
Pislak made her Fed Cup debut for Slovenia in 2015, while the team was competing in the Europe/Africa Zone Group II.

Group membership World Group II (0–0) World Group II Play-off Europe/Africa Group (3–0)	Matches by surface Hard (3–0) Clay (0–0)	Matches by type Singles (0–0) Doubles (3–0)	Matches by setting Indoors (3–0) Outdoors (0–0)

==== Doubles (3–0) ====
Edition	Stage	Date	Location	Against	Surface	Partner	Opponents	W/L	Score
2015 Fed Cup; Europe/Africa; ZoneGroup II	Pool B	4 February 2015	Tallinn, Estonia	Luxembourg	Hard (i)	Tadeja Majerič	Sharon Pesch; Jo Weisen	W	6–1, 6–2
2015 Fed Cup; Europe/Africa; ZoneGroup II	Pool B	5 February 2015	Tallinn, Estonia	Finland	Hard (i)	Andreja Klepač	Roosa Timonen; Oona Orpana	W	6–1, 6–1
2015 Fed Cup; Europe/Africa; ZoneGroup II	Pool B	6 February 2015	Tallinn, Estonia	(Republic of Ireland) Ireland	Hard (i)	Andreja Klepač	Amy Bowtell; Rachael Dillon	W	6–2, 6–3
