= 2018 Fed Cup Europe/Africa Zone Group II – play-offs =

Subsection of tennis competition

The play-offs of the 2018 Fed Cup Europe/Africa Zone Group II were the final stages of the Group II zonal competition involving teams from Europe and Africa. Using the positions determined in their pools, the eight teams faced off to determine their placing in the 2018 Fed Cup Europe/Africa Zone Group II. The top two teams advanced to Group I, and the bottom two teams were relegated down to the Group III for the next year.

Placing	Pool A	Pool B
1	Greece	Israel
2	Denmark	Luxembourg
3	Egypt	Bosnia and Herzegovina
4	—N/a	Norway

== Promotional play-offs ==
The first-placed teams of each pool played against the second-placed teams of the other pool in head-to-head rounds. The winner of each round advanced to the 2019 Europe/Africa Zone Group I.

=== Greece vs. Luxembourg ===
Greece
2
Tatoi Club, Athens, Greece
21 April
Clay

Luxembourg
1

			1	2	3
1	(Greece) (Luxembourg)	Valentini Grammatikopoulou; Eléonora Molinaro	3; 6	6; 3	4; 6
2	(Greece) (Luxembourg)	Maria Sakkari; Mandy Minella	6; 0	6; 1
3	(Greece) (Luxembourg)	Valentini Grammatikopoulou / Maria Sakkari; Mandy Minella / Eléonora Molinaro	3; 6	6; 2	6; 4

=== Denmark vs. Israel ===
Denmark
2
Tatoi Club, Athens, Greece
21 April
Clay

Israel
1

			1	2	3
1	(Denmark) (Israel)	Clara Tauson; Vlada Ekshibarova	6; 2	6; 1
2	(Denmark) (Israel)	Karen Barritza; Julia Glushko	6; 1	5; 7	1; 6
3	(Denmark) (Israel)	Emilie Francati / Maria Jespersen; Julia Glushko / Lina Glushko	6; 3	6; 4

== Relegation play-offs ==
The third-placed teams of the pools played against each other in a head-to-head round. The loser was relegated to the 2019 Europe/Africa Zone Group III alongside Norway who finished last in Pool B.

=== Egypt vs. Bosnia and Herzegovina ===
Egypt
1
Tatoi Club, Athens, Greece
21 April
Clay

Bosnia and Herzegovina
2

			1	2	3
1	(Egypt) (Bosnia and Herzegovina)	Lamis Alhussein Abdel Aziz; Nefisa Berberović	4; 6	3; 6
2	(Egypt) (Bosnia and Herzegovina)	Sandra Samir; Dea Herdželaš	2; 0			retired
3	(Egypt) (Bosnia and Herzegovina)	Sandra Samir / Rana Sherif Ahmed; Anita Husarić / Jelena Simić	6; 3	5; 7	2; 6

== Final placements ==
Placing	Teams	
Promoted/First	Greece	Denmark
Third	Luxembourg	Israel
Fifth	Bosnia and Herzegovina	
Relegated/Seventh	Egypt	Norway

- Greece and Denmark were promoted to Europe/Africa Zone Group I in 2019.
- Egypt and Norway were relegated to Europe/Africa Zone Group III in 2019.
