= 2015 Fed Cup Europe/Africa Zone Group II – play-offs =

International tennis competition play-offs

The play-offs of the 2015 Fed Cup Europe/Africa Zone Group II were the final stages of the Group II zonal competition involving teams from Europe and Africa. Using the positions determined in their pools, the seven teams faced off to determine their placing in the 2015 Fed Cup Europe/Africa Zone Group II. The top two teams advanced to Group I, and the bottom two teams were relegated down to the Group III for the next year.

Placing	Pool A	Pool B
1	South Africa	Slovenia
2	Estonia	Finland
3	Egypt	Ireland
4	Bosnia and Herzegovina	Luxembourg

== Promotional play-offs ==
The first-placed teams of each pool played against the second-placed teams of the other pool in head-to-head rounds. The winner of each round advanced to the 2016 Europe/Africa Zone Group I.

=== South Africa vs. Finland ===
South Africa
2
Tere Tenniscentre, Tallinn, Estonia
7 February 2015
Plexipave (indoors)

Finland
0

			1	2	3
1	(South Africa) (Finland)	Chanel Simmonds; Piia Suomalainen	6; 2	6; 4
2	(South Africa) (Finland)	Chanelle Scheepers; Ella Leivo	6; 2	6; 0
3	(South Africa) (Finland)	Ilze Hattingh / Michelle Sammons; Piia Suomalainen / Roosa Timonen				not played

=== Estonia vs. Slovenia ===
Estonia
2
Tere Tenniscentre, Tallinn, Estonia
7 February 2015
Plexipave (indoors)

Slovenia
0

			1	2	3
1	(Estonia) (Slovenia)	Anett Kontaveit; Andreja Klepač	5; 7	6; 3	6; 3
2	(Estonia) (Slovenia)	Kaia Kanepi; Tadeja Majerič	6; 2	3; 0		retired
3	(Estonia) (Slovenia)	Kaia Kanepi / Anett Kontaveit; Polona Hercog / Andreja Klepač				not played

== Relegation play-offs ==
The third-placed teams of each pool played against the fourth-placed teams of the other pool in head-to-head rounds. The loser of each round was relegated to the 2016 Europe/Africa Zone Group III.

=== Egypt vs. Luxembourg ===
Egypt
2
Tere Tenniscentre, Tallinn, Estonia
7 February 2015
Plexipave (indoors)

Luxembourg
1

			1	2	3
1	(Egypt) (Luxembourg)	Sandra Samir; Eléonora Molinaro	7^{7} 6^{2}	6; 2
2	(Egypt) (Luxembourg)	Ola Abou Zekry; Claudine Schaul	4; 6	7^{7} 6^{3}	3; 6
3	(Egypt) (Luxembourg)	Ola Abou Zekry / Sandra Samir; Eléonora Molinaro / Claudine Schaul	6; 3	7^{7} 6^{5}

=== Bosnia and Herzegovina vs. Ireland ===
Bosnia and Herzegovina
2
Tere Tenniscentre, Tallinn, Estonia
7 February 2015
Plexipave (indoors)

Ireland
1

			1	2	3
1	(Bosnia and Herzegovina) (Republic of Ireland)	Jelena Simić; Lauren Deegan	0; 6	2; 6
2	(Bosnia and Herzegovina) (Republic of Ireland)	Jasmina Tinjić; Amy Bowtell	6; 2	2; 6	7; 5
3	(Bosnia and Herzegovina) (Republic of Ireland)	Anita Husarić / Jasmina Tinjić; Julie Byrne / Rachael Dillon	6; 2	3; 6	6; 2

== Final placements ==
Placing	Teams	
Promoted	South Africa	Estonia
Third	Finland	Slovenia
Fifth	Egypt	Bosnia and Herzegovina
Relegated	Luxembourg	Ireland
