= Mariam Bolkvadze =

Georgian tennis player (born 1998)

Mariam Bolkvadze მარიამ ბოლქვაძე
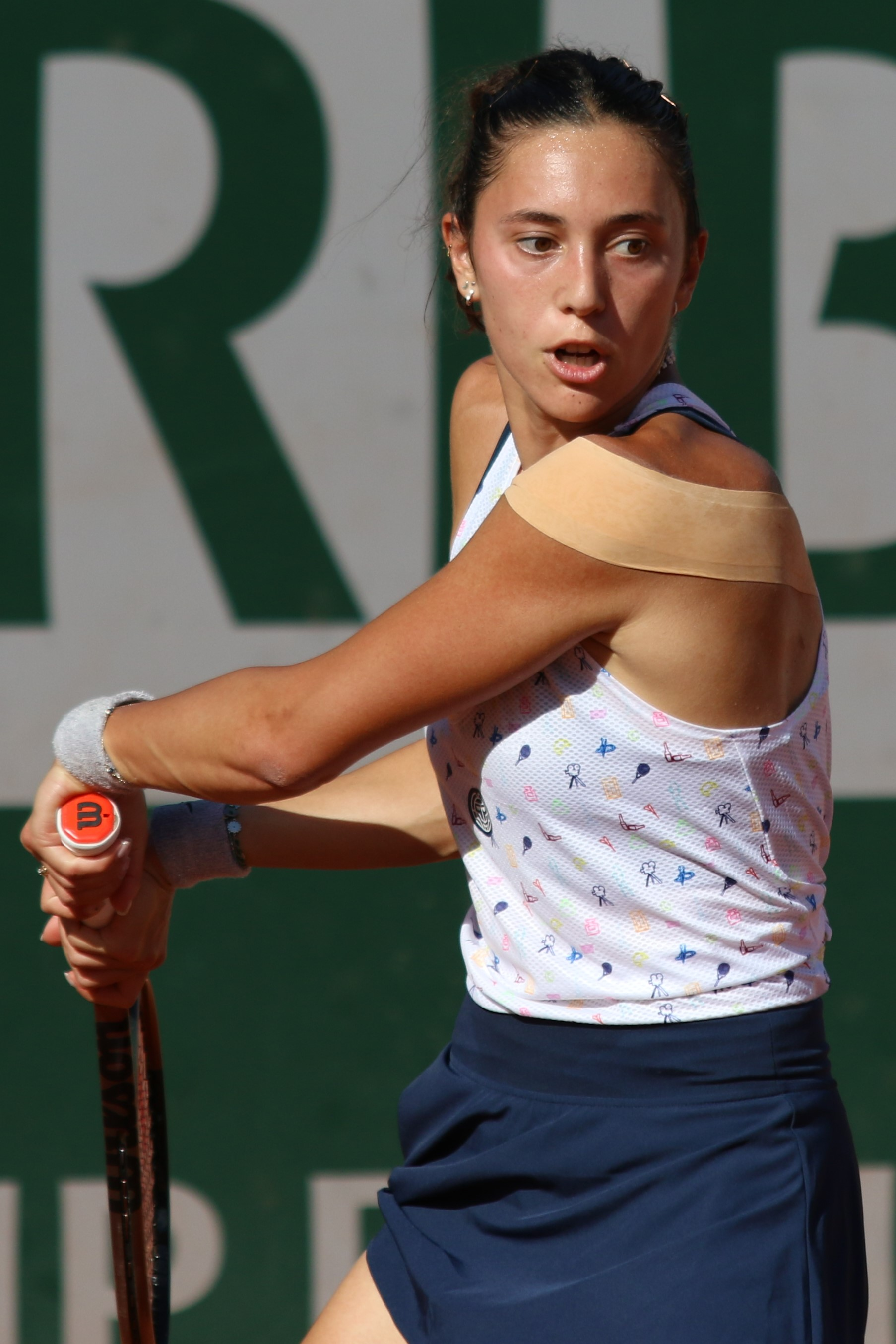
- Bolkvadze at the 2022 French Open
- Country (sports): Georgia
- Residence: London, England
- Born: 1 January 1998 (age 28) Batumi, Georgia
- Turned pro: September 2012
- Plays: Left (two-handed backhand)
- Coach: Simon Ainley
- Prize money: $807,971

Singles
- Career record: 358–233
- Career titles: 8 ITF
- Highest ranking: No. 151 (7 March 2022)
- Current ranking: No. 425 (10 August 2026)

Grand Slam singles results
- Australian Open: Q2 (2021, 2025)
- French Open: Q2 (2021)
- Wimbledon: 2R (2026)
- US Open: 2R (2019)

Doubles
- Career record: 139–92
- Career titles: 12 ITF
- Highest ranking: No. 204 (21 March 2022)

Team competitions
- Fed Cup: 12–14
- Last updated on: 19 August 2026.

Mariam Bolkvadze (Georgian: მარიამ ბოლქვაძე, romanized: mariam bolkvadze, pronounced [maɾiam bolkʰʷadzɛ]; born 1 January 1998) is a Georgian professional tennis player. On 7 March 2022, she achieved a WTA career-high singles ranking of world No. 151, and on 21 March 2022, she peaked at No. 204 in the WTA doubles rankings.

Playing for the Georgia Fed Cup team, Bolkvadze has a win–loss record of 12–14 in Fed Cup competitions, as of August 2026.

== Early life ==
Bolkvadze was born in Batumi. began playing tennis at the age of nine and spent much of her teenage years training in London, after she moved at the age of 13 to the United Kingdom to further her tennis development. She was coached by Otto Buchholdt. She stayed initially with her godmother before finding a host family two years later. Maria Sharapova was her favourite player growing up. She is fluent in Georgian, Russian, and English.

== Career ==
=== 2012–2016: Juniors ===
As a junior Bolkvadze played in very few ITF Circuit events, instead concentrating on domestic competitions organised by the LTA and continental tournaments run by Tennis Europe. She won the 2013 Aegon Junior International in London, defeating Jodie Burrage in the final. At the European Junior Championships held in Moscow later that year she lost to Fanny Stollar in the round of 64.

She reached her only final on the ITF Junior World Tour as a qualifier at the G4 Nottingham event in April 2013, where she was runner-up to Freya Christie.

Bolkvadze was a finalist with American partner Caty McNally in the girls' doubles at the 2016 Wimbledon Championships, losing to Usue Maitane Arconada and Claire Liu in straight sets.

=== 2019–2022: Major debut, career-high ranking ===
Ranked No. 202, Bolkvadze entered 2019 US Open qualifying and was drawn against eighth seed Heather Watson. After beating her in straight sets, she defeated in the second round Han Na-lae in three tight sets to set up a match against Xu Shilin. After another win she qualified for her first major main draw, and became the fourth Georgian to do so. In the first round, she defeated Bernarda Pera in three sets, before losing to third seed Karolína Plíšková. With her wins, she reached a new career-high of No. 156, on 9 September 2019.

=== 2024: Two WTA 125 quarterfinals ===
Bolkvadze reached the quarterfinals at the WTA 125 Polish Open in July with wins over top seed Rebecca Šramková and wildcard entrant Gina Feistel. She lost to fifth seed Maya Joint in the last eight.

The following month Bolkvadze repeated her performance by making it through to another WTA 125 quarterfinal, this time at the Barranquilla Open in Columbia, where she defeated Maria Timofeeva and eighth seed Elsa Jacquemot, before losing to fourth seed and eventual champion, Nadia Podoroska.

=== 2026: Wimbledon debut and first win ===
Ranked No. 545 and using protected ranking, following a series of injuries including two torn hamstrings and a hand problem which required surgery, Bolkvadze qualified to make her main-draw debut at Wimbledon and defeated Ajla Tomljanović, becoming the second woman representing Georgia to win a match at Wimbledon, after Anna Tatishvili. She lost to fellow qualifier Ashlyn Krueger in the second round.

== Grand Slam performance timelines ==
Key
W	F	SF	QF	#R	RR	Q#	P#	DNQ	A	Z#	PO	G	S	B	NMS	NTI	P	NH

(W) winner; (F) finalist; (SF) semifinalist; (QF) quarterfinalist; (#R) rounds 4, 3, 2, 1; (RR) round-robin stage; (Q#) qualification round; (P#) preliminary round; (DNQ) did not qualify; (A) absent; (Z#) Davis/Fed Cup Zonal Group (with number indication) or (PO) play-off; (G) gold, (S) silver or (B) bronze Olympic/Paralympic medal; (NMS) not a Masters tournament; (NTI) not a Tier I tournament; (P) postponed; (NH) not held; (SR) strike rate (events won / competed); (W–L) win–loss record.
To avoid confusion and double counting, these charts are updated at the conclusion of a tournament or when the player's participation has ended.

=== Singles ===
Tournament	2019	2020	2021	2022	…	2026	W–L
Australian Open	A	Q1	Q2	Q1		A	0–0
French Open	A	Q1	Q2	Q1		A	0–0
Wimbledon	Q1	NH	Q1	Q2		2R	1–1
US Open	2R	A	Q2	A		Q3	1–1
Win–loss	1–1	0–0	0–0	0–0		1–1	2–2

== ITF Circuit finals ==
=== Singles: 20 (8 titles, 12 runner-ups) ===
Legend W60/75 tournaments W40/50 tournaments W25/35 tournaments W10/15 tournaments	Finals by surface Hard (5–8) Clay (2–2) Carpet (1–2)

Result	W–L	Date	Tournament	Tier	Surface	Opponent	Score
Loss	0–1	Jul 2014	ITF Astana, Kazakhstan	W10	Hard	(Uzbekistan) Vlada Ekshibarova	7–5, 6–3
Loss	0–2	Aug 2014	ITF Telavi, Georgia	W10	Hard	(Russia) Yuliya Kalabina	4–6, 4–6
Win	1–2	Apr 2015	ITF Sharm El Sheikh, Egypt	W10	Hard	(North Macedonia) Lina Gjorcheska	6–1, 6–4
Win	2–2	Apr 2016	ITF Sharm El Sheikh, Egypt	W10	Hard	(Russia) Sofya Zhuk	6–3, 7–5
Win	3–2	Sep 2016	Batumi Ladies Open, Georgia	W10	Clay	(Russia) Aleksandra Pospelova	6–4, 7–6^{(18)}
Win	4–2	May 2017	ITF Cairo, Egypt	W15	Clay	(Paraguay) Camila Giangreco Campiz	6–3, 3–6, 7–6^{(4)}
Loss	4–3	May 2018	ITF Antalya, Turkey	W15	Clay	(United States) Elizabeth Halbauer	3–6, 1–6
Loss	4–4	May 2018	ITF Antalya, Turkey	W15	Clay	(Czech Republic) Magdalena Pantucková	4–6, 1–6
Loss	4–5	Feb 2019	GB Pro-Series Glasgow, UK	W25	Hard (i)	(France) Jessika Ponchet	3–6, 1–6
Loss	4–6	Apr 2019	ITF Óbidos, Portugal	W25	Carpet	(Belgium) Maryna Zanevska	5–7, 2–6
Win	5–6	Apr 2019	ITF Óbidos, Portugal	W25	Carpet	(Spain) Nuria Párrizas Díaz	6–2, 7–6^{(5)}
Loss	5–7	Jun 2021	ITF Montemor-o-Novo, Portugal	W25	Hard	(Brazil) Beatriz Haddad Maia	4–6, 4–6
Win	6–7	Jul 2021	President's Cup, Kazakhstan	W60	Hard	(Russia) Valeria Savinykh	4–6, 6–3, 6–2
Loss	6–8	Jan 2022	GB Pro-Series Loughborough, UK	W25	Hard (i)	(Denmark) Sofia Samavati	2–6, 5–5 ret.
Win	7–8	Dec 2023	ITF Sharm El Sheikh, Egypt	W25	Hard	Elena Pridankina	6–2, 6–1
Win	8–8	Jan 2024	ITF Sharm El Sheikh, Egypt	W35	Hard	Elena Pridankina	6–0, 6–3
Loss	8–9	Jul 2024	ITF Corroios, Portugal	W50	Hard	(Czech Republic) Gabriela Knutson	1–6, 3–6
Loss	8–10	Oct 2024	GB Pro-Series Glasgow, UK	W75	Hard (i)	(Switzerland) Simona Waltert	4–6, 2–6
Loss	8–11	Feb 2025	ITF Herrenschwanden, Switzerland	W35	Carpet (i)	(United States) Anna Rogers	3–6, 6–3, 3–6
Loss	8–12	Mar 2025	ITF Murska Sobota, Slovenia	W75	Hard (i)	(Czech Republic) Tereza Valentová	6–1, 3–6, 2–6

=== Doubles: 23 (12 titles, 11 runner-ups) ===
Legend W80 tournaments W60/75 tournaments W25/35 tournaments W10/15 tournaments	Finals by surface Hard (9–5) Clay (2–3) Carpet (1–3)

Result	W–L	Date	Tournament	Tier	Surface	Partner	Opponents	Score
Loss	0–1	May 2014	ITF Netanya, Israel	W10	Hard	(Russia) Anastasia Pribylova	(Austria) Pia König (Czech Republic) Barbora Štefková	3–6, 2–6
Win	1–1	May 2015	ITF Ashkelon, Israel	W10	Hard	(Hungary) Naomi Totka	(United Kingdom) Laura Deigman (Belgium) Hélène Scholsen	6–0, 6–2
Win	2–1	Jun 2015	ITF Telavi, Georgia	W10	Hard	(Georgia (country)) Tinatin Kavlashvili	(Italy) Marianna Natali (Japan) Seira Shimizu	6–4, 7–5
Win	3–1	Apr 2016	ITF Sharm El Sheikh, Egypt	W10	Hard	(Slovenia) Nastja Kolar	(Ukraine) Oleksandra Korashvili (Russia) Margarita Lazareva	7–6^{(0)}, 7–5
Loss	3–2	Apr 2016	ITF Sharm El Sheikh, Egypt	W10	Hard	(France) Victoria Muntean	(Ukraine) Oleksandra Korashvili (Russia) Margarita Lazareva	5–7, 3–6
Loss	3–3	Aug 2016	ITF Sharm El Sheikh, Egypt	W10	Hard	(Romania) Ana Bianca Mihaila	(India) Sharmada Balu (Montenegro) Ana Veselinović	6–4, 6–7^{(2)}, [8–10]
Loss	3–4	Sep 2016	Batumi Ladies Open, Georgia	W10	Clay	(Georgia (country)) Tatia Mikadze	(Ukraine) Alona Fomina (Russia) Margarita Lazareva	4–6, 2–6
Win	4–4	Oct 2016	ITF Sharm El Sheikh, Egypt	W10	Hard	(Ukraine) Alona Fomina	(Argentina) Guadalupe Pérez Rojas (Switzerland) Jil Teichmann	6–2, 6–3
Win	5–4	Apr 2017	ITF Cairo, Egypt	W15	Clay	(Slovakia) Tereza Mihalíková	(Serbia) Bojana Marinković (Greece) Despina Papamichail	7–6^{(7)}, 6–3
Loss	5–5	Apr 2017	ITF Cairo, Egypt	W15	Clay	(Belgium) Margaux Bovy	(Romania) Irina Fetecău (Czech Republic) Anna Slováková	6–7^{(2)}, 6–2, [5–10]
Win	6–5	Jul 2017	ITF Istanbul, Turkey	W15	Clay	(Georgia (country)) Ekaterine Gorgodze	(Bulgaria) Petia Arshinkova (Turkey) İpek Öz	6–1, 6–3
Loss	6–6	Jul 2017	Telavi Open, Georgia	W15	Clay	(Georgia (country)) Ekaterine Gorgodze	(Belarus) Polina Pekhova (Russia) Maria Solnyshkina	2–6, 6–1, [7–10]
Win	7–6	Mar 2018	ITF Sharm El Sheikh, Egypt	W15	Hard	(Czech Republic) Barbora Štefková	(Colombia) María Paulina Pérez (Colombia) Paula Andrea Pérez	6–2, 7–6^{(6)}
Loss	7–7	Sep 2018	ITF Óbidos, Portugal	W25	Carpet	(Portugal) Inês Murta	(Poland) Katarzyna Piter (Russia) Valeria Savinykh	3–6, 2–6
Loss	7–8	Apr 2019	ITF Óbidos, Portugal	W25	Carpet	(Slovenia) Nastja Kolar	(Georgia (country)) Sofia Shapatava (United Kingdom) Emily Webley-Smith	1–6, 6–2, [9–11]
Win	8–8	Jul 2021	ITF Astana, Kazakhstan	W25	Hard	(Russia) Ekaterina Yashina	(Russia) Vlada Koval (Russia) Anastasia Tikhonova	7–6^{(7)}, 6–1
Win	9–8	Oct 2021	Internationaux de Poitiers, France	W80	Hard (i)	(United Kingdom) Samantha Murray Sharan	(France) Audrey Albié (France) Léolia Jeanjean	7–6^{(5)}, 6–0
Win	10–8	Feb 2022	AK Ladies Open, Germany	W60	Carpet (i)	(United Kingdom) Samantha Murray Sharan	(Switzerland) Susan Bandecchi (Switzerland) Simona Waltert	6–3, 7–5
Win	11–8	Oct 2022	Trnava Indoor, Slovakia	W60	Hard (i)	(United Kingdom) Maia Lumsden	(Switzerland) Conny Perrin (Latvia) Diāna Marcinkēviča	6–2, 6–3
Win	12–8	Aug 2023	ITF Roehampton, UK	W25	Hard	(United Kingdom) Lily Miyazaki	(Australia) Talia Gibson (Australia) Petra Hule	7–5, 6–3
Loss	12–9	Oct 2023	ITF Sunderland, UK	W25	Hard (i)	(United Kingdom) Samantha Murray Sharan	(United Kingdom) Freya Christie (Estonia) Elena Malõgina	0–6, 6–4, [4–10]
Loss	12–10	Oct 2024	GB Pro-Series Glasgow, United Kingdom	W75	Hard (i)	(Netherlands) Isabelle Haverlag	(United Kingdom) Jodie Burrage (United Kingdom) Freya Christie	4–6, 6–3, [5–10]
Loss	12–11	Feb 2025	ITF Herrenschwanden, Switzerland	W35	Carpet (i)	(Austria) Sinja Kraus	Ekaterina Ovcharenko (United Kingdom) Emily Webley-Smith	6–7^{(1)}, 6–2, [9–11]

== Junior Grand Slam tournament finals ==
=== Girls' doubles: 1 (title) ===
Result	Year	Tournament	Surface	Partner	Opponents	Score
Loss	2016	Wimbledon	Grass	(United States) Caty McNally	(United States) Usue Maitane Arconada (United States) Claire Liu	2–6, 3–6

== National representation ==
=== Fed Cup/Billie Jean King Cup ===
Bolkvadze made her Fed Cup debut for Georgia in 2015, while the team was competing in the Europe/Africa Zone Group I, when she was 17 years and 37 days old.

Group membership Round Robin Play-offs	Matches by surface Hard (6–5) Clay (0–0)	Matches by type Singles (4–5) Doubles (2–0)	Matches by setting Indoors (6–5) Outdoors (0–0)

==== Singles (4–5) ====
Edition	Stage	Date	Location	Against	Surface	Opponent	W/L	Score
2015	Z1 PO	Feb 2015	Budapest (HUN)	Turkey	Hard (i)	Başak Eraydın	W	6–3, 6–3
2019	Z1 RR	Feb 2019	Bath (GBR)	Serbia	Hard (i)	Ivana Jorović	L	3–6, 1–6
2019	Z1 RR	Feb 2019	Bath (GBR)	Croatia	Hard (i)	Ana Konjuh	L	4–6, 3–6
2019	Z1 RR	Feb 2019	Bath (GBR)	Turkey	Hard (i)	Çağla Büyükakçay	L	4–6, 1–6
2019	Z1 PO	Feb 2019	Bath (GBR)	Slovenia	Hard (i)	Kaja Juvan	L	1–6, 0–3 ret.
2020	Z2 RR	Feb 2020	Helsinki (FIN)	Israel	Hard (i)	Vlada Katic	W	7–6^{(5)}, 6–1
2020	Z2 RR	Feb 2020	Helsinki (FIN)	Moldova	Hard (i)	Anastasia Vdovenco	W	7–5, 6–3
2020	Z2 RR	Feb 2020	Helsinki (FIN)	Tunisia	Hard (i)	Ons Jabeur	L	2–6, 2–6
2020	Z2 PO	Feb 2020	Helsinki (FIN)	Finland	Hard (i)	Oona Orpana	W	7–5, 6–4

==== Doubles (2–0) ====
Edition	Stage	Date	Location	Against	Surface	Partner	Opponents	W/L	Score
2018	Z1 RR	Feb 2018	Tallinn (EST)	Serbia	Hard (i)	Sofia Shapatava	Olga Danilović; Bojana Marinković	W	6–7^{(7)}, 7–6^{(7)}, 6–3
2019	Z1 RR	Feb 2019	Bath (GBR)	Serbia	Hard (i)	Oksana Kalashnikova	Olga Danilović; Ivana Jorović	W	6–3, 7–5
