= 2025 Billie Jean King Cup qualifying round =

Subsection of tennis competition

The 2025 Billie Jean King Cup qualifying round was held from 10 to 13 April 2025. The six winners of this round qualified for the 2025 Finals, joining hosts, China, and 2024 champions, Italy.

== Teams ==
Eighteen teams played in six groups of three, with the winners of each group advancing to the 2025 Billie Jean King Cup finals. Group A was hosted in Tokyo (Japan), Group B in Ostrava (Czechia), Group C in Bratislava (Slovakia), Group D in Brisbane (Australia), Group E in Radom (Poland), and Group F in The Hague (Netherlands).

The eighteen teams consisted of:

- 11 teams from the 2024 Finals. (2024 champion Italy qualified automatically).
- 7 winning teams from the 2024 Play-offs. (China qualified automatically as host).

The six group winners will play at the 2025 Finals and the 12 losing teams will play in the 2025 play-offs.

Qualified teams
#: World ranking as of 3 December 2024.

Teams from Finals

- Canada (#2)
- Czech Republic (#3)
- Slovakia (#4)
- Australia (#5)
- Poland (#6)
- Great Britain (#7)
- United States (#9)
- Spain (#10)
- Germany (#11)
- Romania (#13)
- Japan (#14)

Teams from Play-offs

- Switzerland (#8)
- Kazakhstan (#12)
- Netherlands (#17)
- Ukraine (#19)
- Brazil (#20)
- Colombia (#24)
- Denmark (#27)

== Results summary ==
Qualified for the Finals
Relegated to the play-offs

=== Overview ===
G = Group, T = Ties, M = Matches, S = Sets, (H) = Hosts

G	Winner				Runner-up				Third			
G	Country	T	M	S	Country	T	M	S	Country	T	M	S
A	Japan (H)	2–0	5–1	11–4	Canada [1]	1–1	4–2	9–5	Romania	0–2	0–6	1–12
B	Spain	2–0	5–1	10–3	Czech Republic [2] (H)	1–1	3–3	6–6	Brazil	0–2	1–5	3–10
C	United States	2–0	5–1	10–2	Slovakia [3] (H)	1–1	4–2	8–6	Denmark	0–2	0–6	2–12
D	Kazakhstan	2–0	5–1	10–3	Australia [4] (H)	1–1	4–2	8–4	Colombia	0–2	0–6	1–12
E	Ukraine	2–0	5–1	10–3	Poland [5] (H)	1–1	3–3	6–8	Switzerland	0–2	1–5	5–10
F	Great Britain [6]	2–0	4–2	8–6	Netherlands (H)	1–1	4–2	9–5	Germany	0–2	1–5	4–10

=== Group A ===
Location: Tokyo, Japan
Venue: Ariake Coliseum
Surface: Hard (i)

Pos.	Country	Ties W–L	Matches W–L	Sets W–L	Games W–L
1	Japan (H)	2–0	5–1	11–4 (73%)	86–64 (57%)
2	Canada [1]	1–1	4–2	9–5 (64%)	73–63 (54%)
3	Romania	0–2	0–6	1–12 (8%)	45–77 (37%)

==== Canada vs. Romania ====
Canada
3
Tokyo, Japan
11 April 2025
Hard (i)

Romania
0

			1	2	3
1	(Canada) (Romania)	Victoria Mboko; Miriam Bulgaru	6; 1	6; 4
2	(Canada) (Romania)	Marina Stakusic; Anca Todoni	6; 4	6; 3
3	(Canada) (Romania)	Kayla Cross / Rebecca Marino; Georgia Crăciun / Mara Gae	6; 2	6; 4

==== Romania vs. Japan ====
Romania
0
Tokyo, Japan
12 April 2025
Hard (i)

Japan
3

			1	2	3
1	(Romania) (Japan)	Miriam Bulgaru; Ena Shibahara	5; 7	2; 6
2	(Romania) (Japan)	Anca Todoni; Moyuka Uchijima	6; 3	6^{3} 7^{7}	2; 6
3	(Romania) (Japan)	Ilinca Amariei / Mara Gae; Shuko Aoyama / Eri Hozumi	4; 6	2; 6

==== Canada vs. Japan ====
Canada
1
Tokyo, Japan
13 April 2025
Hard (i)

Japan
2

			1	2	3
1	(Canada) (Japan)	Victoria Mboko; Ena Shibahara	6; 4	6^{8} 7^{10}	7; 5
2	(Canada) (Japan)	Marina Stakusic; Moyuka Uchijima	3; 6	3; 6
3	(Canada) (Japan)	Kayla Cross / Rebecca Marino; Shuko Aoyama / Ena Shibahara	3; 6	7; 5	2; 6

=== Group B ===
Location: Ostrava, Czech Republic
Venue: RT Torax Arena
Surface: Hard (i)

Pos.	Country	Ties W–L	Matches W–L	Sets W–L	Games W–L
1	Spain	2–0	5–1	10–3 (77%)	73–52 (58%)
2	Czech Republic [2] (H)	1–1	3–3	6–6 (50%)	60–55 (52%)
3	Brazil	0–2	1–5	3–10 (23%)	50–76 (40%)

==== Czech Republic vs. Brazil ====
Czech Republic
2
Ostrava, Czech Republic
10 April 2025
Hard (i)

Brazil
1

			1	2	3
1	(Czech Republic) (Brazil)	Marie Bouzková; Laura Pigossi	6; 0	7^{7} 6^{3}
2	(Czech Republic) (Brazil)	Linda Nosková; Beatriz Haddad Maia	6; 4	6; 0
3	(Czech Republic) (Brazil)	Linda Nosková / Tereza Valentová; Beatriz Haddad Maia / Luisa Stefani	4; 6	6^{4} 7^{7}

==== Spain vs. Brazil ====
Spain
3
Ostrava, Czech Republic
11 April 2025
Hard (i)

Brazil
0

			1	2	3
1	(Spain) (Brazil)	Sara Sorribes Tormo; Laura Pigossi	6; 3	7; 5
2	(Spain) (Brazil)	Jéssica Bouzas Maneiro; Beatriz Haddad Maia	6; 3	4; 6	6; 4
3	(Spain) (Brazil)	Cristina Bucșa / Sara Sorribes Tormo; Laura Pigossi / Luisa Stefani	6; 3	6; 3

==== Czech Republic vs. Spain ====
Czech Republic
1
Ostrava, Czech Republic
12 April 2025
Hard (i)

Spain
2

			1	2	3
1	(Czech Republic) (Spain)	Marie Bouzková; Cristina Bucșa	5; 7	1; 6
2	(Czech Republic) (Spain)	Linda Nosková; Jéssica Bouzas Maneiro	4; 6	2; 6
3	(Czech Republic) (Spain)	Dominika Šalková / Tereza Valentová; Yvonne Cavallé Reimers / Guiomar Maristany	6; 2	7; 5

=== Group C ===
Location: Bratislava, Slovakia
Venue: Peugeot Arena
Surface: Hard (i)

Pos.	Country	Ties W–L	Matches W–L	Sets W–L	Games W–L
1	United States	2–0	5–1	10–2 (83%)	62–44 (58%)
2	Slovakia [3] (H)	1–1	4–2	8–6 (57%)	78–63 (55%)
3	Denmark	0–2	0–6	2–12 (14%)	51–84 (38%)

==== Slovakia vs. Denmark ====
Slovakia
3
Bratislava, Slovakia
11 April 2025
Hard (i)

Denmark
0

			1	2	3
1	(Slovakia) (Denmark)	Viktória Hrunčáková; Rebecca Munk Mortensen	6; 4	6; 3
2	(Slovakia) (Denmark)	Rebecca Šramková; Johanne Christine Svendsen	7^{7} 6^{3}	5; 7	6; 3
3	(Slovakia) (Denmark)	Viktória Hrunčáková / Tereza Mihalíková; Laura Brunkel / Emilie Francati	7^{7} 6^{4}	5; 7	6; 1

==== United States vs. Denmark ====
United States
3
Bratislava, Slovakia
12 April 2025
Hard (i)

Denmark
0

			1	2	3
1	(United States) (Denmark)	Hailey Baptiste; Rebecca Munk Mortensen	6; 1	6; 4
2	(United States) (Denmark)	Bernarda Pera; Johanne Christine Svendsen	6; 3	6; 1
3	(United States) (Denmark)	Desirae Krawczyk / Asia Muhammad; Laura Brunkel / Emilie Francati	6; 4	6; 1

==== Slovakia vs. United States ====
Slovakia
1
Bratislava, Slovakia
13 April 2025
Hard (i)

United States
2

			1	2	3
1	(Slovakia) (United States)	Renáta Jamrichová; Hailey Baptiste	3; 6	4; 6
2	(Slovakia) (United States)	Rebecca Šramková; Bernarda Pera	6^{2} 7^{7}	5; 7
3	(Slovakia) (United States)	Tereza Mihalíková / Mia Pohánková; Desirae Krawczyk / Asia Muhammad	3; 0			retired

Note: Mihalíková/Pohánková retirement victory over Krawczyk/Muhammad was counted as a 6-0, 6-0 win.

=== Group D ===
Location: Brisbane, Australia
Venue: Pat Rafter Arena
Surface: Hard

Pos.	Country	Ties W–L	Matches W–L	Sets W–L	Games W–L
1	Kazakhstan	2–0	5–1	10–3 (77%)	73–41 (64%)
2	Australia [4] (H)	1–1	4–2	8–4 (67%)	60–38 (61%)
3	Colombia	0–2	0–6	1–12 (8%)	23–77 (23%)

==== Australia vs. Kazakhstan ====
Australia
1
Brisbane, Australia
10 April 2025
Hard

Kazakhstan
2

			1	2	3
1	(Australia) (Kazakhstan)	Maya Joint; Yulia Putintseva	2; 6	1; 6
2	(Australia) (Kazakhstan)	Kimberly Birrell; Elena Rybakina	3; 6	6^{4} 7^{7}
3	(Australia) (Kazakhstan)	Storm Hunter / Ellen Perez; Anna Danilina / Zhibek Kulambayeva	6; 3	6; 4

==== Kazakhstan vs. Colombia ====
Kazakhstan
3
Brisbane, Australia
11 April 2025
Hard

Colombia
0

			1	2	3
1	(Kazakhstan) (Colombia)	Yulia Putintseva; Valentina Mediorreal	6; 0	6; 1
2	(Kazakhstan) (Colombia)	Elena Rybakina; Yuliana Lizarazo	6; 1	6; 2
3	(Kazakhstan) (Colombia)	Zarina Diyas / Zhibek Kulambayeva; Yuliana Lizarazo / María Paulina Pérez	6; 2	5; 7	6; 4

==== Australia vs. Colombia ====
Australia
3
Brisbane, Australia
12 April 2025
Hard

Colombia
0

			1	2	3
1	(Australia) (Colombia)	Maya Joint; Yuliana Monroy	6; 1	6; 0
2	(Australia) (Colombia)	Kimberly Birrell; Yuliana Lizarazo	6; 1	6; 3
3	(Australia) (Colombia)	Storm Hunter / Ellen Perez; Valentina Mediorreal / María Paulina Pérez	6; 0	6; 1

=== Group E ===
Location: Radom, Poland
Venue: Radomskie Centrum Sportu
Surface: Clay (i)

Pos.	Country	Ties W–L	Matches W–L	Sets W–L	Games W–L
1	Ukraine	2–0	5–1	10–3 (77%)	71–53 (57%)
2	Poland [5] (H)	1–1	3–3	6–8 (43%)	69–70 (50%)
3	Switzerland	0–2	1–5	5–10 (33%)	60–77 (44%)

==== Poland vs. Switzerland ====
Poland
3
Radom, Poland
10 April 2025
Clay (i)

Switzerland
0

			1	2	3
1	(Poland) (Switzerland)	Katarzyna Kawa; Jil Teichmann	5; 7	6; 4	6; 2
2	(Poland) (Switzerland)	Magda Linette; Viktorija Golubic	6; 4	6; 3
3	(Poland) (Switzerland)	Maja Chwalińska / Martyna Kubka; Céline Naef / Jil Teichmann	6; 3	4; 6	6; 2

==== Poland vs. Ukraine ====
Poland
0
Radom, Poland
11 April 2025
Clay (i)

Ukraine
3

			1	2	3
1	(Poland) (Ukraine)	Katarzyna Kawa; Marta Kostyuk	1; 6	2; 6
2	(Poland) (Ukraine)	Maja Chwalińska; Elina Svitolina	6^{4} 7^{7}	3; 6
3	(Poland) (Ukraine)	Maja Chwalińska / Martyna Kubka; Lyudmyla Kichenok / Nadiia Kichenok	6^{1} 7^{7}	6^{5} 7^{7}

==== Switzerland vs. Ukraine ====
Switzerland
1
Radom, Poland
12 April 2025
Clay (i)

Ukraine
2

			1	2	3
1	(Switzerland) (Ukraine)	Céline Naef; Marta Kostyuk	6; 4	7^{7} 6^{1}
2	(Switzerland) (Ukraine)	Jil Teichmann; Elina Svitolina	4; 6	2; 6
3	(Switzerland) (Ukraine)	Susan Bandecchi / Céline Naef; Nadiia Kichenok / Katarina Zavatska	4; 6	6; 3	[5] [10]

=== Group F ===
Location: The Hague, Netherlands
Venue: Sportcampus Zuiderpark
Surface: Clay (i)

Pos.	Country	Ties W–L	Matches W–L	Sets W–L	Games W–L
1	Great Britain [6]	2–0	4–2	8–6 (57%)	65–55 (54%)
2	Netherlands (H)	1–1	4–2	9–5 (64%)	69–64 (52%)
3	Germany	0–2	1–5	4–10 (29%)	57–72 (44%)

==== Germany vs. Netherlands ====
Germany
0
The Hague, Netherlands
10 April 2025
Clay (i)

Netherlands
3

			1	2	3
1	(Germany) (Netherlands)	Jule Niemeier; Eva Vedder	3; 6	1; 6
2	(Germany) (Netherlands)	Tatjana Maria; Suzan Lamens	6; 3	3; 6	5; 7
3	(Germany) (Netherlands)	Anna-Lena Friedsam / Laura Siegemund; Suzan Lamens / Demi Schuurs	6^{5} 7^{7}	5; 7

==== Great Britain vs. Germany ====
Great Britain
2
The Hague, Netherlands
11 April 2025
Clay (i)

Germany
1

			1	2	3
1	(United Kingdom) (Germany)	Sonay Kartal; Jule Niemeier	6; 4	6; 2
2	(United Kingdom) (Germany)	Katie Boulter; Tatjana Maria	1; 6	6; 3	6; 1
3	(United Kingdom) (Germany)	Harriet Dart / Olivia Nicholls; Anna-Lena Friedsam / Laura Siegemund	4; 6	1; 6

==== Great Britain vs. Netherlands ====
Great Britain
2
The Hague, Netherlands
12 April 2025
Clay (i)

Netherlands
1

			1	2	3
1	(United Kingdom) (Netherlands)	Sonay Kartal; Eva Vedder	6; 4	4; 6	6; 1
2	(United Kingdom) (Netherlands)	Katie Boulter; Suzan Lamens	4; 6	3; 6
3	(United Kingdom) (Netherlands)	Katie Boulter / Jodie Burrage; Suzan Lamens / Demi Schuurs	6; 2	6; 2
