= 2015 Fed Cup Europe/Africa Zone Group II – Pool B =

International tennis competition

Group B of the 2015 Fed Cup Europe/Africa Zone Group II was one of two pools in the Europe/Africa zone of the 2015 Fed Cup. Four teams competed in a round robin competition, with the top team and the bottom team proceeding to their respective sections of the play-offs: the top team played for advancement to Group I, while the bottom team faced potential relegation to Group III.

== Standings ==
		(Finland) FIN	(Slovenia) SLO	(Republic of Ireland) IRL	(Luxembourg) LUX	RR; W–L	Match; W–L	Set; W–L	Game; W–L	Standings
55	Finland		0–3	2–1	2–1	2–1	5–4	10–8	80–82	2
60	Slovenia	3–0		2–1	3–0	3–0	8–1	15–2	115–49	1
70	Ireland	1–2	1–2		2–1	1–2	4–5	8–11	83–95	3
73	Luxembourg	1–2	0–3	1–2		0–3	1–8	2–16	52–104	4

== Round-robin ==
=== Finland vs. Ireland ===
Finland
2
Tere Tenniscentre, Tallinn, Estonia
4 February 2015
Plexipave (indoors)

Ireland
1

			1	2	3
1	(Finland) (Republic of Ireland)	Piia Suomalainen; Julie Byrne	7^{7} 6^{1}	6; 3
2	(Finland) (Republic of Ireland)	Ella Leivo; Amy Bowtell	1; 6	2; 6
3	(Finland) (Republic of Ireland)	Piia Suomalainen / Roosa Timonen; Amy Bowtell / Rachael Dillon	6; 3	6; 2

=== Slovenia vs. Luxembourg ===
Slovenia
3
Tere Tenniscentre, Tallinn, Estonia
4 February 2015
Plexipave (indoors)

Luxembourg
0

			1	2	3
1	(Slovenia) (Luxembourg)	Tadeja Majerič; Eléonora Molinaro	6; 3	6; 1
2	(Slovenia) (Luxembourg)	Polona Hercog; Sharon Pesch	6; 1	6; 0
3	(Slovenia) (Luxembourg)	Tadeja Majerič / Manca Pislak; Sharon Pesch / Jo Weisen	6; 1	6; 2

=== Finland vs. Slovenia ===
Finland
0
Tere Tenniscentre, Tallinn, Estonia
5 February 2015
Plexipave (indoors)

Slovenia
3

			1	2	3
1	(Finland) (Slovenia)	Oona Orpana; Tadeja Majerič	6^{5} 7^{7}	5; 7
2	(Finland) (Slovenia)	Ella Leivo; Polona Hercog	0; 6	1; 6
3	(Finland) (Slovenia)	Roosa Timonen / Oona Orpana; Andreja Klepač / Manca Pislak	1; 6	1; 6

=== Ireland vs. Luxembourg ===
Ireland
2
Tere Tenniscentre, Tallinn, Estonia
5 February 2015
Plexipave (indoors)

Luxembourg
1

			1	2	3
1	(Republic of Ireland) (Luxembourg)	Julie Byrne; Eléonora Molinaro	2; 6	3; 6
2	(Republic of Ireland) (Luxembourg)	Amy Bowtell; Claudine Schaul	6; 2	6; 4
3	(Republic of Ireland) (Luxembourg)	Amy Bowtell / Rachael Dillon; Eléonora Molinaro / Claudine Schaul	6; 3	7; 5

=== Slovenia vs. Ireland ===
Slovenia
2
Tere Tenniscentre, Tallinn, Estonia
6 February 2015
Plexipave (indoors)

Ireland
1

			1	2	3
1	(Slovenia) (Republic of Ireland)	Tadeja Majerič; Lauren Deegan	5; 7	6; 1	6; 3
2	(Slovenia) (Republic of Ireland)	Polona Hercog; Amy Bowtell	6^{7} 7^{9}	6; 4		retired
3	(Slovenia) (Republic of Ireland)	Andreja Klepač / Manca Pislak; Amy Bowtell / Rachael Dillon	6; 2	6; 3

=== Finland vs. Luxembourg ===
Finland
3
Tere Tenniscentre, Tallinn, Estonia
6 February 2015
Plexipave (indoors)

Luxembourg
0

			1	2	3
1	(Finland) (Luxembourg)	Oona Orpana; Eléonora Molinaro	7; 5	6; 4
2	(Finland) (Luxembourg)	Piia Suomalainen; Claudine Schaul	6; 1	6; 2
3	(Finland) (Luxembourg)	Roosa Timonen / Ella Leivo; Sharon Pesch / Jo Weisen	7^{7} 6^{4}	6; 0
