= 2019 Fed Cup Europe/Africa Zone Group I – Pool A (Zielona Góra) =

Subsection of tennis competition

Pool A (Zielona Góra) of the 2019 Fed Cup Europe/Africa Zone Group I is one of four pools in the Europe/Africa zone of the 2019 Fed Cup. Three teams competed in a round robin competition, with the top team and the bottom team proceeding to their respective sections of the play-offs: the top team played for advancement to the World Group II Play-offs, while the bottom team faced potential relegation to Group II.

== Standings ==
		RUS	POL	DEN	RR; W–L	Set; W–L	Game; W–L	Standings
1	Russia		2–1	3–0	2–0	11–2 (85%)	70–39 (64%)	1
6	Poland	1–2		3–0	1–1	8–5 (62%)	61–49 (56%)	2
11	Denmark	0–3	0–3		0–2	0–12 (0%)	31–74 (30%)	3

Standings are determined by: 1. number of wins; 2. number of matches; 3. in two-team ties, head-to-head records; 4. in three-team ties, (a) percentage of sets won (head-to-head records if two teams remain tied), then (b) percentage of games won (head-to-head records if two teams remain tied), then (c) Fed Cup rankings.

== Round-robin ==
=== Russia vs. Poland ===
Russia
2
Hala Widowiskowo-Sportowa, Zielona Góra, Poland
6 February
Hard (indoor)

Poland
1

			1	2	3
1	(Russia) (Poland)	Natalia Vikhlyantseva; Iga Świątek	6; 0	6; 2
2	(Russia) (Poland)	Anastasia Pavlyuchenkova; Magda Linette	6; 4	6; 3
3	(Russia) (Poland)	Margarita Gasparyan / Daria Kasatkina; Alicja Rosolska / Iga Świątek	0; 6	6; 3	3; 6

=== Russia vs. Denmark ===
Russia
3
Hala Widowiskowo-Sportowa, Zielona Góra, Poland
7 February
Hard (indoor)

Denmark
0

			1	2	3
1	(Russia) (Denmark)	Natalia Vikhlyantseva; Clara Tauson	7^{7} 6^{3}	6; 1
2	(Russia) (Denmark)	Daria Kasatkina; Karen Barritza	6; 0	6; 4
3	(Russia) (Denmark)	Margarita Gasparyan / Anastasia Potapova; Karen Barritza / Maria Jespersen	6; 2	6; 2

=== Poland vs. Denmark ===
Poland
3
Hala Widowiskowo-Sportowa, Zielona Góra, Poland
8 February
Hard (indoor)

Denmark
0

			1	2	3
1	(Poland) (Denmark)	Iga Świątek; Clara Tauson	6; 3	7^{9} 6^{7}
2	(Poland) (Denmark)	Magda Linette; Karen Barritza	6; 2	6; 2
3	(Poland) (Denmark)	Maja Chwalińska / Alicja Rosolska; Maria Jespersen / Hannah Viller Møller	6; 0	6; 3
