= 2024 Billie Jean King Cup play-offs =

Part of tennis tournament

The 2024 Billie Jean King Cup play-offs were held from 15 to 17 November 2024.

== Teams ==
Sixteen teams played for eight spots in the 2025 qualifying round, in series decided on a home and away basis.

These sixteen teams were:

- 8 losing teams from the qualifying round, in April 2024
- 8 winning teams from their Group I zone

Eight winners will advance to the 2025 qualifying round while losers will contest in their respective regional Group I event in 2025.

Seeded teams

1. Switzerland (#7)
2. Kazakhstan (#13)
3. France (#14)
4. Slovenia (#16)
5. Belgium (#17)
6. Ukraine (#18)
7. Brazil (#19)
8. Mexico (#20)

Unseeded teams

- Netherlands (#21)
- Argentina (#22)
- China (#23)
- Austria (#24)
- Colombia (#25)
- Serbia (#26)
- South Korea (#32)
- Denmark (#33)

== Results summary ==
Home team	Score	Away team	Location	Venue	Surface
Switzerland [1]	4–0	Serbia	Biel/Bienne	Swiss Tennis Arena	Hard (i)
Kazakhstan [2]	3–1	South Korea	Astana	National Tennis Center (Beeline Arena)	Hard (i)
Colombia	3–2	France [3]	Bogotá	Hatogrande Country Club	Clay
Slovenia [4]	1–3	Netherlands	Velenje	Bela dvorana Velenje	Clay (i)
China	3–2	Belgium [5]	Guangzhou	Guangzhou Nansha International Tennis Center	Hard
Ukraine [6]	3–2	Austria	McKinney	The Courts McKinney	Hard (i)
Brazil [7]	3–2	Argentina	São Paulo	Ginásio Ibirapuera	Clay (i)
Denmark	3–2	Mexico [8]	Farum	Farum Arena	Hard (i)

== Results ==
=== Switzerland vs. Serbia ===
Switzerland
4
Swiss Tennis Arena, Biel/Bienne, Switzerland
15–16 November 2024
Hard (i)

Serbia
0

			1	2	3
1	(Switzerland) (Serbia)	Belinda Bencic; Lola Radivojević	6; 2	6; 2
2	(Switzerland) (Serbia)	Viktorija Golubic; Mia Ristić	6; 2	6; 3
3	(Switzerland) (Serbia)	Viktorija Golubic; Lola Radivojević	6; 0	6; 0
4	(Switzerland) (Serbia)	Belinda Bencic; Mia Ristić				not played
5	(Switzerland) (Serbia)	Belinda Bencic / Jil Teichmann; Natalija Senić / Anja Stanković	6; 1	6; 1

=== Kazakhstan vs. South Korea ===
Kazakhstan
3
National Tennis Center (Beeline Arena), Astana, Kazakhstan
16–17 November 2024
Hard (i)

South Korea
1

			1	2	3
1	(Kazakhstan) (South Korea)	Zarina Diyas; Back Da-yeon	3; 6	6; 3	7^{7} 6^{1}
2	(Kazakhstan) (South Korea)	Elena Rybakina; Park So-hyun	6; 2	6; 2
3	(Kazakhstan) (South Korea)	Yulia Putintseva; Ku Yeon-woo	6; 4	7; 5
4	(Kazakhstan) (South Korea)	Zarina Diyas; Park So-hyun				not played
5	(Kazakhstan) (South Korea)	Anna Danilina / Zhibek Kulambayeva; Kim Da-bin / Ku Yeon-woo	3; 6	6; 4	[7] [10]

=== Colombia vs. France ===
Colombia
3
Hatogrande Country Club, Bogotá, Colombia
16–17 November 2024
Clay

France
2

			1	2	3
1	(Colombia) (France)	Emiliana Arango; Diane Parry	2; 6	4; 6
2	(Colombia) (France)	Camila Osorio; Clara Burel	6; 4	7; 5
3	(Colombia) (France)	Camila Osorio; Varvara Gracheva	6; 2	7; 5
4	(Colombia) (France)	Emiliana Arango; Clara Burel	5; 7	4; 6
5	(Colombia) (France)	Emiliana Arango / Camila Osorio; Clara Burel / Chloé Paquet	6; 3	6; 4

=== Slovenia vs. Netherlands ===
Slovenia
1
Bela dvorana Velenje, Velenje, Slovenia
15–16 November 2024
Clay (i)

Netherlands
3

			1	2	3
1	(Slovenia) (Netherlands)	Tamara Zidanšek; Arantxa Rus	7^{7} 6^{4}	5; 7	2; 6
2	(Slovenia) (Netherlands)	Veronika Erjavec; Suzan Lamens	4; 6	6; 3	1; 6
3	(Slovenia) (Netherlands)	Veronika Erjavec; Arantxa Rus	7; 5	6; 2
4	(Slovenia) (Netherlands)	Tamara Zidanšek; Suzan Lamens	6; 4	3; 6	2; 6
5	(Slovenia) (Netherlands)	Živa Falkner / Pia Lovrič; Arianne Hartono / Demi Schuurs				not played

=== China vs. Belgium ===
China
3
Guangzhou Nansha International Tennis Center, Guangzhou, China
16–17 November 2024
Hard

Belgium
2

			1	2	3
1	(China) (Belgium)	Wei Sijia; Marie Benoît	6; 3	7^{7} 6^{4}
2	(China) (Belgium)	Wang Xiyu; Hanne Vandewinkel	6; 3	6; 2
3	(China) (Belgium)	Wang Xiyu; Sofia Costoulas	5; 7	5; 7
4	(China) (Belgium)	Wei Sijia; Hanne Vandewinkel	3; 6	3; 6
5	(China) (Belgium)	Guo Hanyu / Jiang Xinyu; Sofia Costoulas / Hanne Vandewinkel	7^{7} 6^{3}	6; 3

=== Ukraine vs. Austria ===
Ukraine
3
The Courts McKinney, McKinney, United States
16–17 November 2024
Hard (i)

Austria
2

			1	2	3
1	(Ukraine) (Austria)	Lesia Tsurenko; Tamira Paszek	6; 3	7; 5
2	(Ukraine) (Austria)	Katarina Zavatska; Sinja Kraus	3; 6	7; 5	5; 7
3	(Ukraine) (Austria)	Lesia Tsurenko; Sinja Kraus	1; 6	1; 6
4	(Ukraine) (Austria)	Katarina Zavatska; Julia Grabher	6; 2	7; 5
5	(Ukraine) (Austria)	Nadiia Kichenok / Katarina Zavatska; Sinja Kraus / Tamira Paszek	5; 7	6; 2	6; 4

=== Brazil vs. Argentina ===
Brazil
3
Ginásio Ibirapuera, São Paulo, Brazil
15–16 November 2024
Clay

Argentina
2

			1	2	3
1	(Brazil) (Argentina)	Laura Pigossi; Solana Sierra	6; 3	1; 6	2; 6
2	(Brazil) (Argentina)	Beatriz Haddad Maia; Jazmín Ortenzi	3; 6	7; 5	6; 2
3	(Brazil) (Argentina)	Beatriz Haddad Maia; Solana Sierra	1; 6	6; 4	6; 1
4	(Brazil) (Argentina)	Laura Pigossi; Jazmín Ortenzi	2; 6	1; 6
5	(Brazil) (Argentina)	Carolina Alves / Beatriz Haddad Maia; Julia Riera / Jazmín Ortenzi	6; 3	6; 2

=== Denmark vs. Mexico ===
Denmark
3
Farum Arena, Farum, Mexico
15–16 November 2024
Hard (i)

Mexico
2

			1	2	3
1	(Denmark) (Mexico)	Clara Tauson; Giuliana Olmos	6; 4	6; 2
2	(Denmark) (Mexico)	Johanne Christine Svendsen; Renata Zarazúa	6^{5} 7^{7}	2; 6
3	(Denmark) (Mexico)	Clara Tauson; Renata Zarazúa	6^{3} 7^{7}	6; 3	5; 7
4	(Denmark) (Mexico)	Johanne Christine Svendsen; Giuliana Olmos	6; 4	7; 5
5	(Denmark) (Mexico)	Emilie Francati / Clara Tauson; Giuliana Olmos / Renata Zarazúa	2; 6	6; 4	6; 4
