= 2020 Billie Jean King Cup Europe/Africa Zone Group II – Pool A =

Subsection of tennis competition

Pool A of the 2020 Billie Jean King Cup Europe/Africa Zone Group II was one of four pools in the Europe/Africa zone of the 2020–21 Billie Jean King Cup. Four teams competed in a round robin competition, with the top teams and the bottom teams proceeding to their respective sections of the play-offs: the top team played for advancement to Group I.

== Standings ==
		GEO	TUN	ISR	MDA	RR; W–L	Set; W–L	Game; W–L	Standings
5	Georgia		2–1	2–1	3–0	7–2	15–5 (75%)	108–72 (60%)	1
3	Tunisia	1–2		2–1	3–0	6–3	12–6 (67%)	85–66 (56%)	2
1	Israel	1–2	1–2		3–0	5–4	11–9 (55%)	97–88 (52%)	3
8	Moldova	0–3	0–3	0–3		0–9	0–18 (0%)	46–110 (29%)	4

Standings are determined by: 1. number of wins; 2. number of matches; 3. in two-team ties, head-to-head records; 4. in three-team ties, (a) percentage of matches won (head-to-head records if two teams remain tied), then (b) percentage of sets won (head-to-head records if two teams remain tied), then (c) percentage of games won (head-to-head records if two teams remain tied), then (d) Billie Jean King Cup rankings.

== Round-robin ==
=== Israel vs. Georgia ===
Israel
1
Tali Tennis Centre, Helsinki, Finland
4 February 2020
Hard (indoors)

Georgia
2

			1	2	3
1	(Israel) (Georgia (country))	Lina Glushko; Ekaterine Gorgodze	3; 6	6; 4	4; 6
2	(Israel) (Georgia (country))	Vlada Katic; Mariam Bolkvadze	6^{5} 7^{7}	1; 6
3	(Israel) (Georgia (country))	Lina Glushko / Shavit Kimchi; Oksana Kalashnikova / Zoziya Kardava	4; 6	7; 5	6; 3

=== Tunisia vs. Moldova ===
Tunisia
3
Tali Tennis Centre, Helsinki, Finland
4 February 2020
Hard (indoors)

Moldova
0

			1	2	3
1	(Tunisia) (Moldova)	Chiraz Bechri; Daniela Ciobanu	6; 2	6; 3
2	(Tunisia) (Moldova)	Ons Jabeur; Anastasia Vdovenco	6; 2	6; 0
3	(Tunisia) (Moldova)	Ferdaous Bahri / Chiraz Bechri; Daniela Ciobanu / Iana Tishchenko	6; 4	6; 4

=== Israel vs. Tunisia ===
Israel
1
Tali Tennis Centre, Helsinki, Finland
5 February 2020
Hard (indoors)

Tunisia
2

			1	2	3
1	(Israel) (Tunisia)	Lina Glushko; Chiraz Bechri	6; 1	6; 2
2	(Israel) (Tunisia)	Vlada Katic; Ons Jabeur	4; 6	0; 6
3	(Israel) (Tunisia)	Lina Glushko / Shavit Kimchi; Chiraz Bechri / Ons Jabeur	6^{4} 7^{7}	1; 6

=== Georgia vs. Moldova ===
Georgia
3
Tali Tennis Centre, Helsinki, Finland
5 February 2020
Hard (indoors)

Moldova
0

			1	2	3
1	(Georgia (country)) (Moldova)	Ekaterine Gorgodze; Iana Tishchenko	6; 0	6; 0
2	(Georgia (country)) (Moldova)	Mariam Bolkvadze; Anastasia Vdovenco	7; 5	6; 3
3	(Georgia (country)) (Moldova)	Mariam Dalakishvili / Zoziya Kardava; Daniela Ciobanu / Anastasia Vdovenco	6; 2	6; 4

=== Israel vs. Moldova ===
Israel
3
Tali Tennis Centre, Helsinki, Finland
6 February 2020
Hard (indoors)

Moldova
0

			1	2	3
1	(Israel) (Moldova)	Shelly Bereznyak; Daniela Ciobanu	6; 3	6; 1
2	(Israel) (Moldova)	Lina Glushko; Anastasia Vdovenco	6; 4	6; 1
3	(Israel) (Moldova)	Nicole Khirin / Shavit Kimchi; Daniela Ciobanu / Anastasia Vdovenco	6; 2	7^{7} 6^{5}

=== Tunisia vs. Georgia ===
Tunisia
1
Tali Tennis Centre, Helsinki, Finland
6 February 2020
Hard (indoors)

Georgia
2

			1	2	3
1	(Tunisia) (Georgia (country))	Chiraz Bechri; Ekaterine Gorgodze	1; 6	3; 6
2	(Tunisia) (Georgia (country))	Ons Jabeur; Mariam Bolkvadze	6; 2	6; 2
3	(Tunisia) (Georgia (country))	Chiraz Bechri / Ons Jabeur; Ekaterine Gorgodze / Oksana Kalashnikova	3; 6	2; 6
