= 2015 Fed Cup Europe/Africa Zone =

Subsection of tennis competition

The Europe/Africa Zone was one of three zones of regional competition in the 2015 Fed Cup .

== Group I ==
- Venue: Syma Sport and Events Centre, Budapest, Hungary (indoor hard)
- Date: 4–7 February

The sixteen teams were divided into four pools of four teams. The four pool winners will take part in play-offs to determine the two nations advancing to the World Group II play-offs. The nations finishing last in their pools will take part in relegation play-offs, with the two losing nations being relegated to Group II for 2016.

=== Pools ===
	Pool A	SRB	HUN	AUT
1	Serbia (2–0)		2–1	3–0
2	Hungary (1–1)	1–2		3–0
3	Austria (0–2)	0–3	0–3	

	Pool B	GBR	TUR	UKR	LIE
1	Great Britain (2–1)		1–2	3–0	3–0
2	Turkey (2–1)	2–1		1–2	3–0
3	Ukraine (2–1)	0–3	2–1		3–0
4	Liechtenstein (0–3)	0–3	0–3	0–3	

	Pool C	BLR	GEO	BUL	POR
1	Belarus (3–0)		3–0	3–0	2–1
2	Georgia (2–1)	0–3		2–1	2–1
3	Bulgaria (1–2)	0–3	1–2		3–0
4	Portugal (0–3)	1–2	1–2	0–3	

	Pool D	CRO	BEL	ISR	LAT
1	Croatia (3–0)		2–1	3–0	2–1
2	Belgium (2–1)	1–2		3–0	3–0
3	Israel (1–2)	0–3	0–3		2–1
4	Latvia (0–3)	1–2	0–3	1–2	

=== Play-offs ===
Placing	A Team	Score	D Team
Promotional	Serbia	2–0	Croatia
5th–8th	Hungary	3–0	Belgium
9th–12th	N/A	–	Israel
Relegation	Austria	1–2	Latvia

Placing	B Team	Score	C Team
Promotional	Great Britain	0–2	Belarus
5th–8th	Turkey	2–1	Georgia
9th–12th	Ukraine	2–0	Bulgaria
Relegation	Liechtenstein	0–2	Portugal

- Serbia and Belarus advanced to World Group II play-offs.
- Austria and Liechtenstein were relegated to Europe/Africa Group II in 2016.

== Group II ==
- Venue: Tere Tenniscentre, Tallinn, Estonia (indoor hard)
- Dates: 4–7 February

The eight teams were divided into two pools of four teams. The two nations placing first and second will take part in play-offs to determine the two nations advancing to Group I. The nations finishing last in their pools will take part in relegation play-offs, with the two losing nations being relegated to Group III for 2016.

=== Pools ===
	Pool A	RSA	EST	EGY	BIH
1	South Africa (3–0)		2–1	3–0	2–1
2	Estonia (2–1)	1–2		2–1	3–0
3	Egypt (1–2)	0–3	1–2		2–1
4	Bosnia and Herzegovina (0–3)	1–2	0–3	0–3	

	Pool B	SVN	FIN	IRL	LUX
1	Slovenia (3–0)		3–0	2–1	3–0
2	Finland (2–1)	0–3		2–1	2–1
3	Ireland (1–2)	1–2	1–2		2–1
4	Luxembourg (0–3)	0–3	1–2	1–2	

=== Play-offs ===
Placing	A Team	Score	B Team
Promotional	South Africa	2–0	Finland
Promotional	Estonia	2–0	Slovenia
Relegation	Egypt	2–1	Luxembourg
Relegation	Bosnia and Herzegovina	2–1	Ireland

- South Africa and Estonia advanced to Europe/Africa Group I in 2016.
- Luxembourg and Ireland were relegated to Europe/Africa Group III in 2016.

== Group III ==
- Venue: Bellevue, Ulcinj, Montenegro (outdoor clay)
- Dates: 13–18 April

=== Pools ===
	Pool A	LTU	CYP	ISL
1	Lithuania (2–0)		2–1	3–0
2	Cyprus (1–1)	1–2		3–0
3	Iceland (0–2)	0–3	0–3	

	Pool B	GRE	ARM	MNE
1	Greece (2–0)		3–0	3–0
2	Armenia (1–1)	0–3		2–1
3	Montenegro (0–2)	0–3	1–2	

	Pool C	DEN	NOR	ALG
1	Denmark (2–0)		2–1	3–0
2	Norway (1–1)	1–2		2–1
3	Algeria (0–2)	0–3	1–2	

	Pool D	MDA	MKD	NAM	MOZ
1	Moldova (3–0)		2–1	2–1	3–0
2	Macedonia (2–1)	1–2		3–0	3–0
3	Namibia (1–2)	1–2	0–3		3–0
4	Mozambique (0–3)	0–3	0–3	0–3	

=== Play-offs ===
Placing	A Team	Score	D Team
Promotional	Lithuania	2–1	Moldova
5th–8th	Cyprus	1–2	Macedonia
9th–12th	Iceland	0–3	Namibia

Placing	B Team	Score	C Team
Promotional	Greece	0–2	Denmark
5th–8th	Armenia	0–3	Norway
9th–12th	Montenegro	0–3	Algeria

- Lithuania and Denmark advanced to Europe/Africa Group II in 2016.
