= 2015 Fed Cup Europe/Africa Zone Group III – Pool A =

International tennis competition

Pool A of the 2015 Fed Cup Europe/Africa Group III was one of four pools in the Europe/Africa Group III of the 2015 Fed Cup. Three teams competed in a round robin competition, with the top team and bottom teams proceeding to their respective sections of the play-offs: the top team played for advancement to Group II.

== Standings ==
		LTU	CYP	ISL	RR; W–L	Set; W–L	Game; W–L	Standings
61	Lithuania		2–1	3–0	5–1	10–2	67–30	1
85	Cyprus	1–2		3–0	4–2	8–5	68–41	2
92	Iceland	0–3	0–3		0–6	1–12	12–76	3

== Round-robin ==
=== Cyprus vs. Iceland ===
Cyprus
3
Bellevue, Ulcinj, Montenegro
14 April 2015
Clay

Iceland
0

			1	2	3
1	(Cyprus) (Iceland)	Maria Siopacha; Anna Soffia Grönholm	6; 0	6; 0
2	(Cyprus) (Iceland)	Eliza Omirou; Hjördís Rósa Guðmundsdóttir	6; 0	6; 0
3	(Cyprus) (Iceland)	Themis Haliou / Maria Stylianou; Anna Soffia Grönholm / Hjördís Rósa Guðmundsdóttir	6; 1	4; 6	6; 3

=== Lithuania vs. Iceland ===
Lithuania
3
Bellevue, Ulcinj, Montenegro
15 April 2015
Clay

Iceland
0

			1	2	3
1	(Lithuania) (Iceland)	Akvilė Paražinskaitė; Hera Brynjarsdóttir	6; 0	6; 1
2	(Lithuania) (Iceland)	Lina Stančiūtė; Hjördís Rósa Guðmundsdóttir	6; 1	6; 0
3	(Lithuania) (Iceland)	Akvilė Paražinskaitė / Lina Stančiūtė; Hera Brynjarsdóttir / Hjördís Rósa Guðmundsdóttir	6; 0	6; 0

=== Lithuania vs. Cyprus ===
Lithuania
2
Bellevue, Ulcinj, Montenegro
16 April 2015
Clay

Cyprus
1

			1	2	3
1	(Lithuania) (Cyprus)	Akvilė Paražinskaitė; Maria Siopacha	6; 4	6; 2
2	(Lithuania) (Cyprus)	Lina Stančiūtė; Eliza Omirou	3; 6	4; 6
3	(Lithuania) (Cyprus)	Akvilė Paražinskaitė / Lina Stančiūtė; Eliza Omirou / Maria Siopacha	7^{7} 6^{5}	6; 4

== See also ==
- Fed Cup structure
