= Maria Inês Fonte =

Portuguese tennis player (born 2002)

- Country (sports): Portugal
- Born: 1 February 2002 (age 23)
- Plays: Right (two-handed backhand)
- College: Syracuse University
- Prize money: $13,219

Singles
- Career record: 37–48
- Career titles: 0
- Highest ranking: 823 (21 October 2021)

Doubles
- Career record: 16–38
- Career titles: 0
- Highest ranking: 670 (28 September 2020)

Team competitions
- Fed Cup: 1–7

Maria Inês Fonte (born 1 February 2002) is a Portuguese tennis player, currently playing for the Syracuse University tennis team.

She has career-high WTA rankings of 823 in singles, reached on 21 October 2021, and 670 in doubles, achieved on 28 September 2020.

Fonte made her Fed Cup debut for Portugal in 2019.
