= Piia Suomalainen =

Finnish tennis player

- Country (sports): Finland
- Born: 9 July 1984 (age 42) Helsinki
- Height: 1.72 m (5 ft 8 in)
- Plays: Right (two-handed backhand)
- Prize money: $68,858

Singles
- Career record: 273–225
- Career titles: 5 ITF
- Highest ranking: No. 356 (10 October 2011)

Doubles
- Career record: 49–36
- Career titles: 5 ITF
- Highest ranking: No. 524 (15 January 2007)

Team competitions
- Fed Cup: 37–34

Piia Suomalainen (born 9 July 1984) is a Finnish former tennis player.

In her career, Suomalainen won five singles and five doubles titles on the ITF Women's Circuit. On 10 October 2011, she reached her best singles ranking of world No. 356. On 15 January 2007, she peaked at No. 524 in the doubles rankings.

Since her debut for the Finland Fed Cup team in 2002, Suomalainen has a 37–34 record in Fed Cup competition.

== ITF finals ==
=== Singles (5–8) ===
Legend $100,000 tournaments $75,000 tournaments $50,000 tournaments $25,000 tournaments $10,000 tournaments	Finals by surface Hard (2–3) Clay (3–5) Grass (0–0) Carpet (0–0)

Result	No.	Date	Tournament	Surface	Opponent	Score
Loss	1.	27 November 2005	Sunderland, United Kingdom	Hard (i)	(Estonia) Margit Rüütel	5–7, 0–6
Loss	2.	16 July 2006	Birkerød, Denmark	Clay	(Germany) Anne Schäfer	4–6, 2–6
Loss	3.	20 August 2006	Savitaipale, Finland	Clay	(Spain) Eva Fernández Brugués	4–6, 6–3, 2–6
Loss	4.	19 November 2006	Sunderland, United Kingdom	Hard (i)	(Germany) Martina Pavelec	2–6, 4–6
Loss	5.	19 August 2007	Savitaipale, Finland	Clay	(Netherlands) Marcella Koek	7–5, 4–6, 5–7
Loss	6.	24 October 2009	Pretoria, South Africa	Hard	(France) Irina Ramialison	5–7, 2–6
Loss	7.	27 June 2010	Cleveland, United States	Clay	(United States) Madison Keys	2–6, 4–6
Loss	8.	8 August 2010	Savitaipale, Finland	Clay	(Norway) Ulrikke Eikeri	5–7, 4–6
Win	1.	7 November 2010	Manila, Philippines	Hard	(Thailand) Luksika Kumkhum	6–3, 6–3
Win	2.	31 July 2011	Tampere Open, Finland	Clay	(Germany) Dinah Pfizenmaier	7–5, 6–0
Win	3.	20 May 2012	Landisville, United States	Hard	(United States) Elizabeth Lumpkin	7–6^{(7–4)}, 6–1
Win	4.	5 August 2012	Savitaipale, Finland	Clay	(France) Laëtitia Sarrazin	3–6, 6–3, 6–3
Win	5.	24 July 2016	Tampere Open, Finland	Clay	(Finland) Emma Laine	0–6, 6–2, 6–3

=== Doubles (5–3) ===
Legend $25,000 tournaments $10,000 tournaments	Finals by surface Hard (2–2) Clay (3–1)

Result	No.	Date	Tier	Tournament	Surface	Partner	Opponents	Score
Loss	1.	11 March 2006	10,000	Sunderland, United Kingdom	Hard (i)	(Sweden) Nadja Roma	(Germany) Carmen Klaschka (Germany) Korina Perkovic	2–6, 3–6
Win	1.	19 August 2006	10,000	Savitaipale, Finland	Clay	(Finland) Katariina Tuohimaa	(Belgium) Davinia Lobbinger (Latvia) Alise Vaidere	7–5, 6–3
Loss	2.	4 November 2006	10,000	Stockholm, Sweden	Hard (i)	(Finland) Katariina Tuohimaa	(Sweden) Diana Eriksson (Denmark) Hanne Skak Jensen	w/o
Win	2.	18 November 2006	10,000	Sunderland, United Kingdom	Hard (i)	(Finland) Katariina Tuohimaa	(Germany) Laura Haberkorn (Germany) Martina Pavelec	6–3, 6–4
Win	3.	3 August 2007	10,000	Tampere, Finland	Clay	(Finland) Katariina Tuohimaa	(Denmark) Hanne Skak Jensen (Netherlands) Marcella Koek	6–2, 6–4
Win	4.	23 October 2009	10,000	Pretoria, South Africa	Hard	(Germany) Sina Haas	(Switzerland) Lucia Kovarčíková (Czech Republic) Zuzana Linhová	7–6^{(7–2)}, 6–2
Loss	3.	27 July 2013	10,000	Tampere Open, Finland	Clay	(Finland) Emma Laine	(Germany) Julia Wachaczyk (Germany) Nina Zander	4–6, 4–6
Win	5.	3 August 2013	10,000	Savitaipale, Finland	Clay	(Finland) Emma Laine	(Russia) Anastasiya Komardina (Lithuania) Akvilė Paražinskaitė	6–4, 6–4
