= Roosa Timonen =

Finnish tennis player

- Full name: Roosa Timonen
- Country (sports): Finland
- Born: 20 February 1997 (age 28); Tampere, Finland
- Prize money: $1,595

Singles
- Career record: 6–11
- Career titles: 0
- Highest ranking: —

Doubles
- Career record: 4–6
- Career titles: 0
- Highest ranking: —

Team competitions
- Fed Cup: 3–1

Roosa Timonen (born 20 February 1997 in Tampere) is a Finnish tennis player.

Playing for Finland at the Fed Cup, Timonen has a win–loss record of 3–1.

== ITF finals (0–1) ==
=== Doubles (0–1) ===
Legend $100,000 tournaments $75,000 tournaments $50,000 tournaments $25,000 tournaments $15,000 tournaments $10,000 tournaments	Finals by surface Hard (0–1) Clay (0–0) Grass (0–0) Carpet (0–0)

Outcome	No.	Date	Tournament	Surface	Partner	Opponents	Score
Runner-up	1.	31 August 2015	Sharm el-Sheikh, Egypt	Hard	(Finland) Ella Leivo	(Russia) Yulia Bryzgalova (India) Kanika Vaidya	6–7^{(4–7)}, 4–6
