= Chiraz Bechri =

Tunisian tennis player (born 1998)

- Country (sports): Tunisia
- Born: 23 July 1998 (age 27)
- Plays: Right (two-handed backhand)
- Coach: Chory ben Amor
- Prize money: $63,718

Singles
- Career record: 164–195
- Career titles: 1 ITF
- Highest ranking: No. 571 (18 April 2016)
- Current ranking: No. 1,445 (8 september 2025)

Doubles
- Career record: 44–59
- Career titles: 2 ITF
- Highest ranking: No. 671 (17 July 2023)
- Last updated on: 8 september 2025.

Chiraz Bechri (born 23 July 1998) is a Tunisian professional tennis player.

She has a career-high singles ranking of 571, achieved on 18 April 2016. She also has a career-high doubles ranking of 671, set on 17 July 2023. Bechri has won one singles title and two doubles titles on the ITF Women's Circuit.

She has represented Tunisia in Billie Jean King Cup (and Fed Cup), where she has a win–loss record of 26–17 (as of September 2024).

Bechri made her WTA Tour debut as a wildcard entrant at the 2024 Jasmin Open, losing to third seed Diane Parry in the first round.

== ITF Circuit finals ==
=== Singles: 5 (1 title, 4 runner–ups) ===
Legend $10/15,000 tournaments	Finals by surface Hard (1–4)

Result	W–L	Date	Tournament	Tier	Surface	Opponent	Score
Loss	0–1	Sep 2015	ITF Port El Kantaoui, Tunisia	10,000	Hard	(France) Manon Arcangioli	4–6, 3–6
Loss	0–2	Sep 2015	ITF Port El Kantaoui, Tunisia	10,000	Hard	(France) Josephine Boualem	6–7^{(4)}, 0–6
Loss	0–3	Nov 2015	ITF Port El Kantaoui, Tunisia	10,000	Hard	(Bulgaria) Isabella Shinikova	1–6, 2–6
Win	1–3	Oct 2016	ITF Hammamet, Tunisia	10,000	Hard	(France) Jade Suvrijn	4–0 ret.
Loss	1–4	Sep 2018	ITF Monastir, Tunisia	15,000	Hard	(Serbia) Barbara Bonić	6–4, 1–6, 3–6
Loss	1–5	Feb 2023	ITF Monastir, Tunisia	15,000	Hard	(France) Nina Radovanovic	3–6, 0–6

=== Doubles: 5 (2 titles, 3 runner–ups) ===
Legend $10/15,000 tournaments	Finals by surface Hard (2–3)

Result	W–L	Date	Tournament	Tier	Surface	Partner	Opponents	Score
Win	1–0	Sep 2015	ITF Port El Kantaoui, Tunisia	10,000	Hard	(Belarus) Valeria Mishina	(Italy) Federica Joe Gardella (Italy) Marianna Natali	6–3, 6–3
Loss	1–1	Sep 2018	ITF Monastir, Tunisia	15,000	Hard	(Cambodia) Andrea Ka	(Spain) Paula Arias Manjón (Spain) Andrea Lázaro García	1–6, 0–6
Win	2–1	Sep 2018	ITF Monastir, Tunisia	15,000	Hard	(Serbia) Barbara Bonić	(Venezuela) Nadia Echeverria Alam (United Kingdom) Anna Popescu	6–4, 6–4
Loss	2–2	Dec 2022	ITF Monastir, Tunisia	15,000	Hard	Milana Zhabrailova	(Greece) Magdalini Adaloglou (Greece) Sapfo Sakellaridi	5–7, 4–6
Loss	2–3	Dec 2023	ITF Monastir, Tunisia	15,000	Hard	Milana Zhabrailova	(Germany) Selina Dal (Netherlands) Stéphanie Visscher	2–6, 3–6
