= Karen Barritza =

Danish tennis player

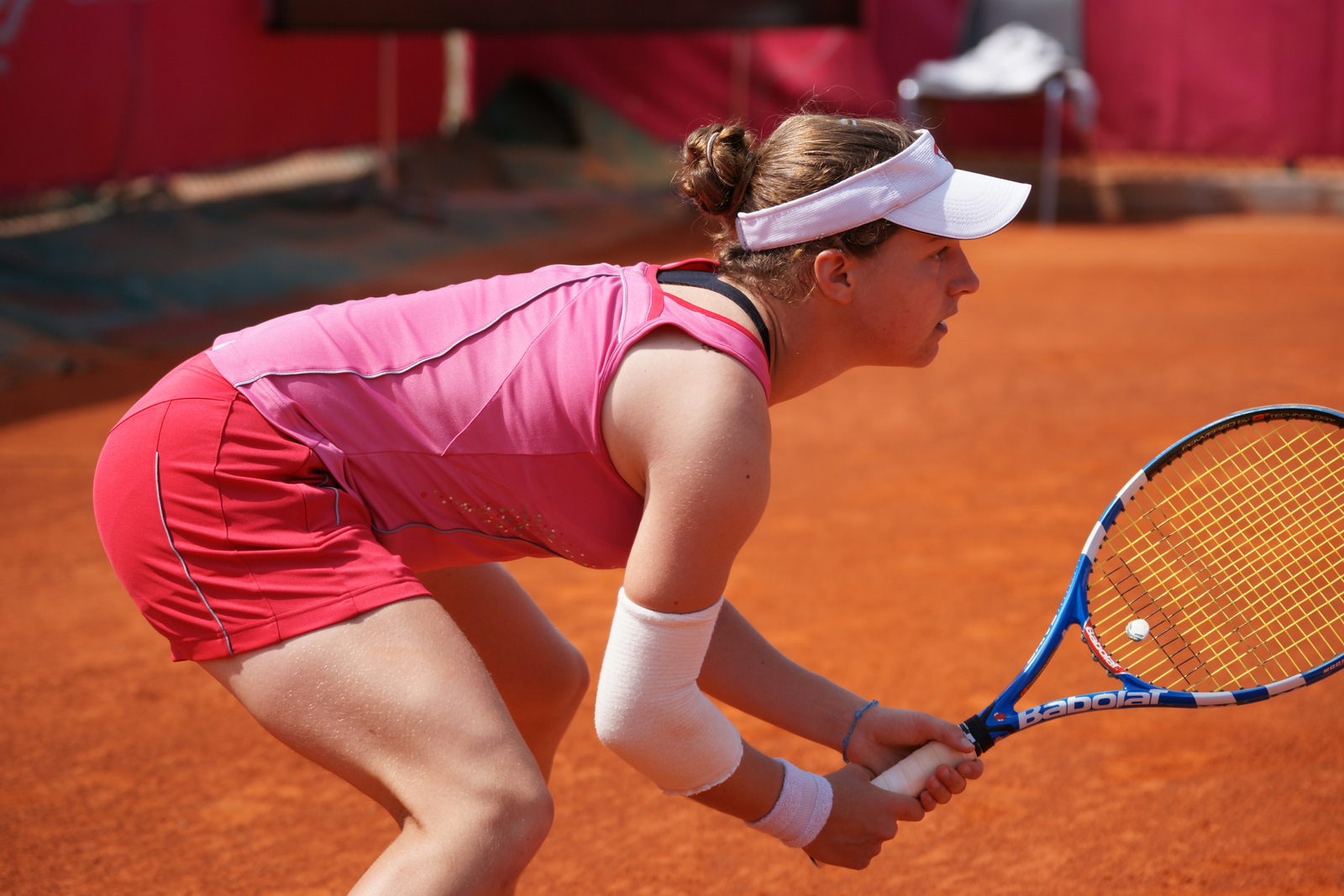
- Karen at the 2011 Open GdF Suez
- Country (sports): Denmark
- Residence: Bagsvaerd, Denmark
- Born: 3 July 1992 (age 32); Aalborg, Denmark
- Plays: Right-handed (two-handed backhand)
- Prize money: US$ 84,756

Singles
- Career record: 292–217
- Career titles: 7 ITF
- Highest ranking: No. 396 (17 April 2017)

Doubles
- Career record: 77–106
- Career titles: 7 ITF
- Highest ranking: No. 362 (16 July 2012)

Team competitions
- Fed Cup: 18–21

Karen Barritza (born Barbat, 3 July 1992) is a Danish former tennis player.

She has won seven singles and seven doubles titles on the ITF Circuit. On 17 April 2017, she reached her best singles ranking of world No. 396. On 16 July 2012, she peaked at No. 362 in the WTA doubles rankings.

Barritza made her WTA Tour main-draw debut at the 2010 Danish Open in the doubles event, partnering Mai Grage.

Playing for Denmark Fed Cup team, she has a win–loss record of 18–21.

== ITF Circuit finals ==
=== Singles: 13 (7 titles, 6 runner-ups) ===
Legend $50,000 tournaments $25,000 tournaments $15,000 tournaments $10,000 tournaments	Finals by surface Hard (2–2) Clay (4–4) Carpet (1–0)

Result	No.	Date	Tournament	Surface	Opponent	Score
Loss	1.	21 June 2010	ITF Gausdal, Norway	Hard	(France) Victoria Larrière	6–1, 6–2
Win	1.	23 May 2011	ITF Paros, Greece	Carpet	(Greece) Despoina Vogasari	6–1, 7–5
Win	2.	22 July 2013	ITF Tampere, Finland	Clay	(Russia) Liubov Vasilyeva	6–1, 7–6^{(7)}
Win	3.	29 July 2013	ITF Savitaipale, Finland	Clay	(Russia) Antonina Lysakova	7–5, 6–3
Loss	2.	23 December 2013	ITF Istanbul, Turkey	Hard (i)	(Belgium) Elise Mertens	7–5, 4–6, 6–4
Loss	3.	3 August 2014	ITF Copenhagen, Denmark	Clay	(Denmark) Mai Grage	4–6, 5–7
Win	4.	8 November 2014	ITF Oslo, Norway	Hard (i)	(Sweden) Cornelia Lister	6–2, 6–2
Loss	4.	12 July 2015	ITF Amstelveen, Netherlands	Clay	(Netherlands) Bibiane Weijers	4–6, 6–3, 1–6
Loss	5.	26 July 2015	ITF Tampere, Finland	Clay	(Hungary) Lilla Barzó	2–6, 4–6
Win	5.	15 May 2016	ITF Båstad, Sweden	Clay	(Sweden) Cornelia Lister	6–4, 6–4
Loss	6.	22 August 2016	ITF Rotterdam, Netherlands	Clay	(United States) Chiara Scholl	6–7^{(4)}, 7–5, 6–7^{(8)}
Win	6.	20 November 2016	ITF Helsinki, Finland	Hard (i)	(Russia) Elena Rybakina	6–3, 6–4
Win	7.	27 August 2017	ITF Rotterdam, Netherlands	Clay	(Germany) Tayisiya Morderger	2–6, 6–4, 6–4

=== Doubles: 12 (7 titles, 5 runner-ups) ===
Legend $25,000 tournaments $10,000 tournaments	Finals by surface Hard (3–4) Clay (4–1)

Result	No.	Date	Tournament	Surface	Partner	Opponents	Score
Win	1.	29 June 2010	ITF Gausdal, Norway	Hard	(United Kingdom) Mhairi Brown	(United Kingdom) Lisa Whybourn (United Kingdom) Nicola George	6–2, 6–2
Win	2.	23 October 2010	GB Pro-Series Glasgow, UK	Hard (i)	(Italy) Julia Mayr	(Greece) Eirini Georgatou (Russia) Valeria Savinykh	w/o
Loss	1.	1 November 2010	ITF Stockholm, Sweden	Hard (i)	(Sweden) Anna Brazhnikova	(Switzerland) Xenia Knoll (Switzerland) Lara Michel	3–6, 3–6
Win	3.	22 August 2011	ITF Braunschweig, Germany	Clay	(Vietnam) Huỳnh Phương Đài Trang	(Germany) Sabrina Baumgarten (Philippines) Katharina Lehnert	6–2, 6–4
Loss	2.	31 October 2011	ITF Stockholm, Sweden	Hard (i)	(Germany) Julia Kimmelmann	(Netherlands) Ghislaine van Baal (Netherlands) Lisanne van Riet	2–6, 7–6, 3–6
Loss	3.	28 May 2012	ITF Maribor, Slovenia	Clay	(Germany) Anna-Lena Friedsam	(Romania) Elena Bogdan (Germany) Kathrin Wörle	2–6, 6–2, [5–10]
Win	4.	31 July 2012	ITF Savitaipale, Finland	Clay	(Sweden) Eveliina Virtanen	(Poland) Olga Brózda (Czech Republic) Nikola Horáková	w/o
Loss	4.	5 November 2012	GB Pro-Series Loughborough, UK	Hard (i)	(Switzerland) Lara Michel	(United Kingdom) Anna Fitzpatrick (United Kingdom) Jade Windley	2–6, 2–6
Win	5.	1 August 2014	ITF Copenhagen, Denmark	Clay	(Slovakia) Klaudia Boczová	(Denmark) Emilie Francati (Denmark) Maria Jespersen	6–4, 6–1
Win	6.	22 August 2016	ITF Rotterdam, Netherlands	Clay	(United States) Chiara Scholl	(Netherlands) Rosalie van der Hoek (Belarus) Sviatlana Pirazhenka	6–2, 6–3
Loss	5.	31 October 2016	ITF Oslo, Norway	Hard (i)	(Slovakia) Michaela Hončová	(Netherlands) Chayenne Ewijk (Netherlands) Rosalie van der Hoek	4–6, 4–6
Win	7.	20 November 2016	ITF Helsinki, Finland	Hard (i)	(Romania) Laura Ioana Andrei	(Russia) Alina Silich (Russia) Valeriya Zeleva	6–4, 6–3
