= Maria Jespersen =

Danish tennis player

- Country (sports): Denmark
- Residence: Copenhagen, Denmark
- Born: 3 December 1991 (age 33); Hornbæk, Denmark
- Plays: Right (two-handed backhand)
- Prize money: $3,782

Singles
- Career record: 13–14

Doubles
- Career record: 13–8
- Career titles: 2 ITF
- Highest ranking: No. 850 (30 April 2018)

Team competitions
- Fed Cup: 3–1

Maria Jespersen (born 3 December 1991) is a Danish former tennis player.

Jespersen has a career-high doubles ranking by the WTA of 850, achieved on 30 April 2018. In her career, she won two doubles titles ITF Women's Circuit.

Jespersen has represented Denmark in Fed Cup, where she has a win–loss record of 3–1.

== ITF finals ==
=== Doubles (2–1) ===
Legend $25,000 tournaments $10/15,000 tournaments	Finals by surface Clay (0–1) Hard (2–0)

Result	No.	Date	Location	Surface	Partner	Opponents	Score
Loss	1.	1 August 2014	Copenhagen, Denmark	Clay	(Denmark) Emilie Francati	(Denmark) Karen Barritza (Slovakia) Klaudia Boczová	4–6, 1–6
Win	1.	25 March 2018	Heraklion, Greece	Hard	(Denmark) Emilie Francati	(United Kingdom) Emily Appleton (Finland) Mia Eklund	7–5, 4–6, [10–8]
Win	2.	31 March 2018	Heraklion, Greece	Hard	(Denmark) Emilie Francati	(Belgium) Michaela Boev (Romania) Ioana Gașpar	6–3, 6–1
