= Emilie Francati =

Danish tennis player

- Country (sports): Denmark
- Residence: Hellerup, Denmark
- Born: 24 June 1997 (age 28); Gentofte, Denmark
- Plays: Right (two-handed backhand)
- Prize money: $24,855

Singles
- Career record: 79–57
- Career titles: 1 ITF
- Highest ranking: No. 574 (26 September 2016)

Grand Slam singles results
- Australian Open Junior: 2R (2014)
- Wimbledon Junior: 1R (2015)
- US Open Junior: Q1 (2014)

Doubles
- Career record: 76–27
- Career titles: 11 ITF
- Highest ranking: No. 420 (2 July 2018)

Grand Slam doubles results
- Australian Open Junior: SF (2015)
- Wimbledon Junior: 1R (2014)

Team competitions
- Fed Cup: 17–4

Emilie Francati (born 24 June 1997) is a tennis player from Denmark.

She reached a career-high combined junior ranking of 50 and the 2015 Australian Open girls' doubles semifinals. On the ITF Women's Circuit, she won one singles title and 11 doubles titles.

Playing for Denmark Fed Cup team, Francati has a win–loss record of 17–4.

In 2024, Fracanti was selected as the last player for the Denmark women's national tennis team competing in the Billie Jean King Cup at home against Mexico.

== ITF Circuit finals ==
=== Singles: 2 (1 title, 1 runner-up) ===
Legend $15,000 tournaments $10,000 tournaments	Finals by surface Hard (1–1) Clay (0–0)

Result	Date	Tournament	Surface	Opponent	Score
Win	1 November 2015	ITF Stockholm, Sweden	Hard (i)	(Norway) Melanie Stokke	6–4, 3–6, 7–6^{(4)}
Loss	29 October 2017	ITF Sharm El Sheikh, Egypt	Hard	(Egypt) Sandra Samir	3–6, 3–6

=== Doubles: 18 (11 titles, 7 runner-ups) ===
Legend $25,000 tournaments $15,000 tournaments $10,000 tournaments	Finals by surface Hard (4–4) Clay (7–3)

Result	No.	Date	Tournament	Surface	Partner	Opponents	Score
Loss	1.	1 August 2014	ITF Copenhagen, Denmark	Clay	(Denmark) Maria Jespersen	(Denmark) Karen Barbat (Slovakia) Klaudia Boczová	6–4, 6–1
Win	1.	13 February 2016	ITF Sunderland, England	Hard (i)	(United Kingdom) Emily Arbuthnott	(France) Manon Arcangioli (United Kingdom) Harriet Dart	6–3, 4–6, [10–5]
Loss	2.	4 March 2016	ITF Macon, France	Hard (i)	(Belarus) Vera Lapko	(France) Manon Arcangioli (Croatia) Silvia Njiric	5–7, 6–7^{(5)}
Win	2.	13 May 2016	ITF Båstad, Sweden	Clay	(Sweden) Cornelia Lister	(Norway) Astrid Wanja Brune Olsen (Norway) Malene Helgø	6–2, 6–2
Win	3.	21 May 2016	ITF Båstad	Clay	(Sweden) Cornelia Lister	(Romania) Irina Bara (Norway) Melanie Stokke	6–2, 6–4
Loss	3.	12 August 2016	ITF Aprilia, Italy	Clay	(Italy) Deborah Chiesa	(Italy) Giorgia Marchetti (Italy) Angelica Moratelli	1–6, 3–6
Loss	4.	19 November 2016	ITF Heraklion, Greece	Hard	(United Kingdom) Sarah Beth Grey	(France) Manon Arcangioli (Greece) Despina Papamichail	4–6, 2–6
Loss	5.	20 January 2017	ITF Petit-Bourg, France (Guadeloupe)	Hard	(Canada) Charlotte Robillard-Millette	(Japan) Mayo Hibi (Canada) Carol Zhao	6–2, 6–7^{(6)}, [9–11]
Loss	6.	1 April 2017	ITF Sharm El Sheikh, Egypt	Hard	(Sweden) Kajsa Rinaldo Persson	(Romania) Laura Ioana Paar (Austria) Melanie Klaffner	4–6, 5–7
Win	4.	20 May 2017	ITF Antalya, Turkey	Clay	(United States) Dasha Ivanova	(Croatia) Mariana Dražić (Uzbekistan) Arina Folts	6–2, 6–4
Loss	7.	27 May 2017	ITF Antalya, Turkey	Clay	(Croatia) Mariana Dražić	(Romania) Georgia Crăciun (Romania) Ilona Georgiana Ghioroaie	2–6, 4–6
Win	5.	5 August 2017	ITF Porto, Portugal	Clay	(United Kingdom) Emily Arbuthnott	(Italy) Gaia Sanesi (Italy) Lucrezia Stefanini	6–4, 6–3
Win	6.	21 October 2017	ITF Sharm El Sheikh	Hard	(India) Kanika Vaidya	(Austria) Caroline Ilowska (Slovenia) Nastja Kolar	3–6, 7–5, [10–7]
Win	7.	4 November 2017	ITF Sharm El Sheikh	Hard	(Germany) Julia Wachaczyk	(Sweden) Linnéa Malmqvist (Hungary) Naomi Totka	7–6^{(6)}, 6–7^{(5)}, [10–3]
Win	8.	3 March 2018	ITF Sharm El Sheikh	Hard	(Belgium) Britt Geukens	(Belarus) Yuliya Hatouka (Belarus) Iryna Shymanovich	6–0, 6–3
Win	9.	24 March 2018	ITF Heraklion, Greece	Clay	(Denmark) Maria Jespersen	(United Kingdom) Emily Appleton (Finland) Mia Eklund	7–5, 4–6, [10–8]
Win	10.	31 March 2018	ITF Heraklion	Clay	(Denmark) Maria Jespersen	(Belgium) Michaela Boev (Romania) Ioana Gaspar	6–3, 6–1
Win	11.	22 June 2018	ITF Ystad, Sweden	Clay	(United Kingdom) Emily Arbuthnott	(Chinese Taipei) Chen Pei-hsuan (Chinese Taipei) Wu Fang-hsien	6–2, 6–1
