= Finland Billie Jean King Cup team =

Finnish women's tennis team

Finland
- Captain: Emma Laine
- Nations Ranking: 51 ▼3 (16 November 2015)
- First year: 1968
- Years played: 36
- Ties played (W–L): 118 (54–64)
- Years in World Group: 10 (4–10)
- Best finish: World Group QF (1993)
- Most total wins: Emma Laine (48–20)
- Most singles wins: Emma Laine (34–8)
- Most doubles wins: Nanne Dahlman (18–11)
- Best doubles team: Emma Laine / Piia Suomalainen (8–8)
- Most ties played: Piia Suomalainen (44)
- Most years played: Nanne Dahlman (12); Piia Suomalainen (12); Emma Laine (12)

The Finland Billie Jean King Cup team represents Finland in Billie Jean King Cup tennis competition and are governed by the Suomen Tennisliitto. They currently compete in the Europe/Africa Zone of Group II, having missed out on promotion to group I for 2016.

== History ==
Finland competed in its first Fed Cup in 1968. Their best result was reaching the quarterfinals in 1993.

== See also ==
- Billie Jean King Cup
- Finland Davis Cup team
