= Denmark Billie Jean King Cup team =

Danish women's tennis team

Denmark
- Captain: Kenneth Carlsen
- ITF ranking: 26 (April 2025)
- First year: 1963
- Years played: 47
- Ties played (W–L): 140 (66–74)
- Years in World Group: 26 (10–26)
- Best finish: World Group QF (1976, 1988)
- Most total wins: Tine Scheuer-Larsen (33-25)
- Most singles wins: Eva Dyrberg (18-10)
- Most doubles wins: Tine Scheuer-Larsen (17-12)
- Best doubles team: Karin Ptaszek / Tine Scheuer-Larsen (5-2)
- Most ties played: Eva Dyrberg (39)
- Most years played: Tine Scheuer-Larsen (13)

The Denmark Billie Jean King Cup team represents Denmark in the Billie Jean King Cup tennis competition and are governed by the Dansk Tennis Forbund. They currently compete in the World Group Playoff. They rank 26 in the world with 592.75 points.

== History ==
Fed Cup (predecessor of Billie Jean King Cup): Denmark competed in its first Fed Cup in 1963. Their best result was reaching the quarterfinals in 1976 and 1988.

Billie Jean King Cup: Best result 2025 qualification play-off.

== Current team (2025) ==
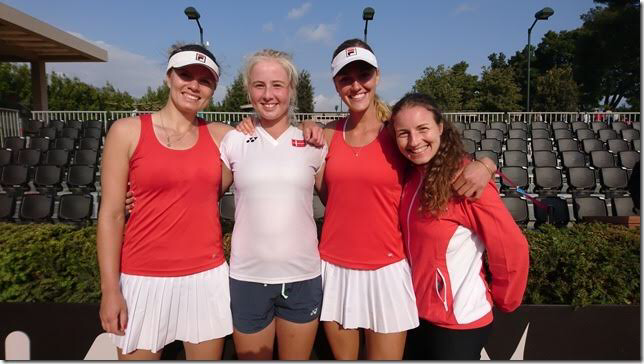
Denmark Fed Cup team in April 2018. From left: Maria Jespersen, Clara Tauson, Emilie Francati and Karen Barritza.

- Clara Tauson
- Johanne Svendsen
- Rebecca Munk Mortensen
- Emma Kamper
- Laura Brunkel

== See also ==
- Billie Jean King Cup
- Denmark Davis Cup team
- Denmark at the Hopman Cup
