= Jeļena Ostapenko career statistics =

Career finals
Discipline	Type	Won	Lost	Total
Singles	Grand Slam	1	0	1
Singles	WTA Finals	–	–	–
Singles	WTA Elite	–	–	–
Singles	WTA 1000 (Note: Formerly known as: Category 4 & 5 & 6 (until 1990); Tier I (until 2009); WTA Premier Mandatory and 5 (until 2021))	0	3	3
Singles	WTA 500 (Note: Formerly known as: Category 3 (until 1990); Tier II (until 2009); WTA Premier (until 2021))	5	2	7
Singles	WTA 250 (Note: Formerly known as: Category 1 & 2 (until 1990); Tier III & IV & V (until 2009); WTA International (until 2021))	3	4	7
Singles	Olympics	–	–	–
Singles	Total	9	9	18
Doubles	Grand Slam	1	3	4
Doubles	WTA Finals	–	–	–
Doubles	Elite Trophy	–	–	–
Doubles	WTA 1000	2	4	6
Doubles	WTA 500	8	4	12
Doubles	WTA 250	1	1	2
Doubles	Olympics	–	–	–
Doubles	Total	12	12	24
Mixed	Grand Slam	0	1	1
Mixed	Olympics	–	–	–
Mixed	Total	0	1	1

This is a list of the main career statistics of the Latvian professional tennis player Jeļena Ostapenko. She won the 2017 French Open in singles and the 2024 US Open in doubles with Lyudmyla Kichenok.

== Performance timelines ==
Key
W	F	SF	QF	#R	RR	Q#	P#	DNQ	A	Z#	PO	G	S	B	NMS	NTI	P	NH

(W) winner; (F) finalist; (SF) semifinalist; (QF) quarterfinalist; (#R) rounds 4, 3, 2, 1; (RR) round-robin stage; (Q#) qualification round; (P#) preliminary round; (DNQ) did not qualify; (A) absent; (Z#) Davis/Fed Cup Zonal Group (with number indication) or (PO) play-off; (G) gold, (S) silver or (B) bronze Olympic/Paralympic medal; (NMS) not a Masters tournament; (NTI) not a Tier I tournament; (P) postponed; (NH) not held; (SR) strike rate (events won / competed); (W–L) win–loss record.
To avoid confusion and double counting, these charts are updated at the conclusion of a tournament or when the player's participation has ended.

Only main-draw results in WTA Tour, Grand Slam tournaments, Billie Jean King Cup (Fed Cup), United Cup, Hopman Cup and Olympic Games are included in win–loss records

=== Singles ===
Current through the 2026 US Open.

Tournament	2013	2014	2015	2016	2017	2018	2019	2020	2021	2022	2023	2024	2025	2026	SR	W–L	Win %
Grand Slam tournaments
Australian Open	A	A	A	1R	3R	3R	1R	2R	1R	3R	QF	3R	1R	2R	0 / 11	14–11	56%
French Open	A	A	Q1	1R	W	1R	1R	3R	1R	2R	2R	2R	3R	2R	1 / 11	15–10	60%
Wimbledon	A	A	2R	1R	QF	SF	1R	NH	3R	4R	2R	QF	1R	3R	0 / 11	22–11	67%
US Open	A	A	2R	1R	3R	3R	3R	A	A	1R	QF	1R	2R	1R	0 / 10	12–10	55%
Win–loss	0–0	0–0	2–2	0–4	15–3	9–4	2–4	3–2	2–3	6–4	10–4	7–4	3–4	4–4	1 / 43	63–42	60%
Year-end championships
WTA Finals	DNQ				RR	DNQ		NH	DNQ						0 / 1	1–2	33%
WTA Elite Trophy	DNQ				A	A	DNQ	NH			RR	NH			0 / 1	1–1	50%
National representation
Summer Olympics	NH			1R	NH				1R	NH		1R	NH		0 / 3	0–3	0%
Billie Jean King Cup	Z2	Z1	Z1	Z1	Z1	PO2	PO	QR (Note: Edition is split into two years due to COVID-19.)		QR	A	Z1	A		0 / 0	22–13	63%
WTA 1000 tournaments
Qatar Open	A	A	NTI	F	NTI	2R	NTI	3R	NTI	SF	NTI	3R	F	SF	0 / 8	21–7	75%
Dubai Championships	Not Tier I		A	NTI	1R	NTI	1R	NTI	2R	NTI	3R	3R	1R	1R	0 / 7	5–7	42%
Indian Wells	A	A	A	A	2R	3R	3R	NH	SF	2R	3R	2R	2R	3R	0 / 9	10–9	53%
Miami Open	A	A	A	Q1	1R	F	2R	NH	3R	2R	4R	3R	2R	4R	0 / 9	12–9	57%
Madrid Open	A	A	A	1R	A	1R	2R	NH	2R	1R	3R	4R	2R	3R	0 / 9	6–9	40%
Italian Open	A	A	A	3R	2R	QF	1R	1R	QF	1R	SF	QF	4R	QF	0 / 11	20–11	65%
Canadian Open	A	A	A	1R	1R	1R	3R	NH	1R	2R	1R	3R	3R	2R	0 / 10	5–10	33%
Cincinnati Open	A	A	A	2R	1R	1R	1R	A	3R	2R	2R	2R	3R	2R	0 / 10	5–10	33%
China Open	A	A	A	1R	SF	2R	2R	NH			QF	A	2R		0 / 6	7–6	54%
Wuhan Open	NH	A	A	1R	SF	1R	A	NH				A	1R		0 / 4	3–4	43%
Guadalajara Open	NH									3R	3R	Not Tier I			0 / 2	3–2	60%
Win–loss	0–0	0–0	0–0	8–7	8–8	9–9	5–8	2–2	13–7	8–8	14–9	8–7	6–10	11–7	0 / 83	92–83	53%
Career statistics
	2013	2014	2015	2016	2017	2018	2019	2020	2021	2022	2023	2024	2025	2026	SR	W–L	Win%
Tournaments	0 (Note: During the season, she did not play in the main draw of any tour-level tournaments. However, she played at the Billie Jean King Cup, which is not counted as a played tournament but matches counted.)	1	5	24	21	21	27	7	20	20	23	20	20	20	Career total: 227		
Titles	0	0	0	0	2	0	1	0	1	1	1	2	1	0	Career total: 9		
Finals	0	0	1	1	3	1	2	0	2	3	1	2	2	0	Career total: 18		
Hard win–loss	0–0	2–4	7–6	14–18	24–15	16–16	19–18	5–5	19–13	22–13	22–16	18–10	9–14	9-13	5 / 153	186–161	54%
Clay win–loss	4–0	0–0	0–0	2–4	16–4	5–4	3–7	4–3	5–4	3–3	7–4	6–5	9–4	7–5	2 / 49	71–47	60%
Grass win–loss	0–0	0–0	1–1	4–4	5–2	7–2	4–3	0–0	8–2	8–3	8–2	5–3	1–2	5–2	2 / 28	56–26	68%
Overall win–loss	4–0	2–4	8–7	20–26	45–21	28–22	26–28	9–8	32–19	33–19	37–22	29–18	19–20	21-20	9 / 229	313–234	57%
Win %	100%	33%	53%	43%	68%	56%	48%	53%	63%	63%	63%	62%	49%	54%	Career total: 57%		
Year-end ranking (Note: 2012: WTA ranking–892.)	672	308	79	44	7	22	44	44	28	18	13	15	23		$18,724,486		

=== Doubles ===
Current through the 2026 US Open

Tournament	2015	2016	2017	2018	2019	2020	2021	2022	2023	2024	2025	2026	SR	W–L	Win%
Grand Slam tournaments
Australian Open	A	1R	1R	1R	2R	QF	3R	2R	1R	F	F	QF (Note: Benefitted from a withdrawal during the tournament. Not counted as a win.)	0 / 11	19–11	63%
French Open	A	1R	1R	1R	QF	3R	3R	SF	2R	2R	2R	2R	0 / 11	14–11	56%
Wimbledon	A	3R	1R	3R (Note: Withdraw during the tournament. Not counted as a loss.)	1R	NH	2R	SF	1R	QF	F	2R	0 / 10	18–8	69%
US Open	A	2R	1R	1R	QF	A	A	3R	2R	W	1R	QF	1 / 9	16–8	67%
Win–loss	0–0	3–4	0–4	2–3	6–4	5–2	5–2	11–4	2–4	15–3	11–4	7–4	1 / 41	67–38	64%
Year-end championships
WTA Finals	DNQ					NH	DNQ	SF	DNQ	RR	SF		0 / 3	4–7	36%
National representation
Summer Olympics	NH	A	Not Held				1R	NH		A	NH		0 / 1	0–1	0%
Billie Jean King Cup	PO	A	A	PO	PO	PO		A	A	Z1	A	A	0 / 0	3–3	50%
WTA 1000 tournaments
Qatar Open	NTI	A	NTI	W	NTI	F	NTI	1R	NTI	1R	2R	F	1 / 6	12–5	71%
Dubai Championships	A	NTI	QF	NTI	QF	NTI	QF	NTI	SF	QF	F	A	0 / 6	12–6	67%
Indian Wells Open	A	A	A	1R	A	NH	SF	1R	2R	QF	QF	2R	0 / 7	9–7	56%
Miami Open	A	A	1R	1R	1R	NH	QF	2R	QF	1R	1R	1R	0 / 9	4–9	31%
Madrid Open	A	A	1R	A	SF	NH	SF	SF	1R	QF	SF	1R	0 / 8	14–8	64%
Italian Open	A	A	1R	SF	1R	2R	1R	2R	QF	QF	2R	1R	0 / 10	9–10	47%
Canadian Open	A	1R	QF	2R	1R	NH	2R	2R	QF	2R	QF	SF	0 / 10	12–10	55%
Cincinnati Open	A	A	2R	2R	2R	A	2R	W	2R	2R	QF	SF	1 / 9	16–7	70%
China Open	A	QF	1R	A	F	NH			1R	A	SF		0 / 5	9–5	64%
Wuhan Open	A	1R	A	2R	A	NH				A	A		0 / 2	1–2	33%
Guadalajara Open	NH							QF	A	Not Tier I			0 / 1	2–1	67%
Career statistics
Tournaments	5	13	18	14	21	7	19	18	19	12	17		Career total: 163		
Titles	0	0	2	1	0	0	1	2	0	3	2		Career total: 10		
Finals	0	0	2	1	2	1	2	4	1	4	5		Career total: 21		
Overall win–loss	3–4	6–13	18–14	14–12	27–20	12–8	23–16	35–17	23–18	30–9	40–15		9 / 163	231–146	61%
Win %	43%	32%	56%	54%	57%	60%	59%	67%	56%	77%	73%		Career total: 61%		
Year-end ranking	152	101	42	38	22	19	23	14	36	6	7				

=== Mixed doubles ===
Tournament	2016	2017	2018	2019	2020	2021	2022	2023	2024	SR	W–L	Win %
Grand Slam tournaments
Australian Open	A	A	A	A	2R	1R	A	QF	A	0 / 3	3–2	60%
French Open	A	1R	1R	A	NH	A	A	1R	A	0 / 3	0–3	0%
Wimbledon	SF	A	A	F	NH	A	QF	A	A	0 / 3	11–3	79%
US Open	1R	2R	A	A	NH	A	QF	A	A	0 / 3	3–3	50%
Win–loss	4–2	1–2	0–1	5–1	1–1	0–1	4–2	2–1	0–0	0 / 12	17–11	61%

== Grand Slam tournament finals ==
=== Singles: 1 (title) ===
Result	Year	Tournament	Surface	Opponent	Score
Win	2017	French Open	Clay	(Romania) Simona Halep	4–6, 6–4, 6–3

=== Doubles: 4 (1 title, 3 runner-ups) ===
Result	Year	Tournament	Surface	Partner	Opponents	Score
Loss	2024	Australian Open	Hard	(Ukraine) Lyudmyla Kichenok	(Chinese Taipei) Hsieh Su-wei (Belgium) Elise Mertens	1–6, 5–7
Win	2024	US Open	Hard	(Ukraine) Lyudmyla Kichenok	(France) Kristina Mladenovic (China) Zhang Shuai	6–4, 6–3
Loss	2025	Australian Open	Hard	(Chinese Taipei) Hsieh Su-wei	(Czech Republic) Kateřina Siniaková (United States) Taylor Townsend	2–6, 7–6^{(7–4)}, 3–6
Loss	2025	Wimbledon	Grass	(Chinese Taipei) Hsieh Su-wei	Veronika Kudermetova (Belgium) Elise Mertens	6–3, 2–6, 4–6

=== Mixed doubles: 2 (1 title, 1 runner-up) ===
Result	Year	Tournament	Surface	Partner	Opponents	Score
Loss	2019	Wimbledon	Grass	(Sweden) Robert Lindstedt	(Chinese Taipei) Latisha Chan (Croatia) Ivan Dodig	2–6, 3–6
Win	2026	Wimbledon	Grass	(El Salvador) Marcelo Arévalo	(Australia) Marc Polmans (Australia) Storm Hunter	4–6, 7–5, 6–2

== Other significant finals ==
=== WTA 1000 tournaments ===
==== Singles: 3 (3 runner-ups) ====
Result	Year	Tournament	Surface	Opponent	Score
Loss	2016	Qatar Ladies Open	Hard	(Spain) Carla Suárez Navarro	6–1, 4–6, 4–6
Loss	2018	Miami Open	Hard	(United States) Sloane Stephens	6–7^{(5–7)}, 1–6
Loss	2025	Qatar Ladies Open	Hard	(United States) Amanda Anisimova	4–6, 3–6

==== Doubles: 6 (2 titles, 4 runner-ups) ====
Result	Year	Tournament	Surface	Partner	Opponents	Score
Win	2018	Qatar Ladies Open	Hard	(Canada) Gabriela Dabrowski	(Slovenia) Andreja Klepač (Spain) María José Martínez Sánchez	6–3, 6–3
Loss	2019	China Open	Hard	(Ukraine) Dayana Yastremska	(United States) Sofia Kenin (United States) Bethanie Mattek-Sands	3–6, 7–6^{(7–5)}, [7–10]
Loss	2020	Qatar Ladies Open	Hard	(Canada) Gabriela Dabrowski	(Chinese Taipei) Hsieh Su-wei (Czech Republic) Barbora Strýcová	2–6, 7–5, [2–10]
Win	2022	Cincinnati Open	Hard	(Ukraine) Lyudmyla Kichenok	(United States) Nicole Melichar-Martinez (Australia) Ellen Perez	7–6^{(7–5)}, 6–3
Loss	2025	Dubai Open	Hard	(Chinese Taipei) Hsieh Su-Wei	(Czech Republic) Kateřina Siniaková (United States) Taylor Townsend	6–7 ^{(5–7)} 4–6
Loss	2026	Qatar Ladies Open	Hard	(Chinese Taipei) Hsieh Su-Wei	(Kazakhstan) Anna Danilina (Serbia) Aleksandra Krunić	6–0, 6–7^{(3–7)}, [8–10]

== WTA Tour finals ==
=== Singles: 18 (9 titles, 9 runner-ups) ===
Legend Grand Slam (1–0) Premier M & Premier 5 / WTA 1000 (0–3) Premier / WTA 500 (5–2) International / WTA 250 (3–4)	Finals by surface Hard (5–6) Clay (2–1) Grass (2–1) Carpet (0–1)	Finals by setting Outdoor (6–6) Indoor (3–3)

Result	W–L	Date	Tournament	Tier	Surface	Opponent	Score
Loss	0–1	Sep 2015	Tournoi de Québec, Canada	International	Carpet (i)	(Germany) Annika Beck	2–6, 2–6
Loss	0–2	Feb 2016	Qatar Ladies Open	Premier 5	Hard	(Spain) Carla Suárez Navarro	6–1, 4–6, 4–6
Loss	0–3	Apr 2017	Charleston Open, US	Premier	Clay	(Russia) Daria Kasatkina	3–6, 1–6
Win	1–3	Jun 2017	French Open, France	Grand Slam	Clay	(Romania) Simona Halep	4–6, 6–4, 6–3
Win	2–3	Sep 2017	Korea Open, South Korea	International	Hard	(Brazil) Beatriz Haddad Maia	6–7^{(5–7)}, 6–1, 6–4
Loss	2–4	Mar 2018	Miami Open, US	Premier M	Hard	(United States) Sloane Stephens	6–7^{(5–7)}, 1–6
Loss	2–5	Oct 2019	Ladies Linz, Austria	International	Hard (i)	(United States) Coco Gauff	3–6, 6–1, 2–6
Win	3–5	Oct 2019	Luxembourg Open	International	Hard (i)	(Germany) Julia Görges	6–4, 6–1
Win	4–5	Jun 2021	Eastbourne International, UK	WTA 500	Grass	(Estonia) Anett Kontaveit	6–3, 6–3
Loss	4–6	Sep 2021	Luxembourg Open	WTA 250	Hard (i)	(Denmark) Clara Tauson	3–6, 6–4, 4–6
Win	5–6	Feb 2022	Dubai Championships, UAE	WTA 500	Hard	(Russia) Veronika Kudermetova	6–0, 6–4
Loss	5–7	Jun 2022	Eastbourne International, UK	WTA 500	Grass	(Czech Republic) Petra Kvitová	3–6, 2–6
Loss	5–8	Sep 2022	Korea Open, South Korea	WTA 250	Hard	Ekaterina Alexandrova	6–7^{(4–7)}, 0–6
Win	6–8	Jun 2023	Birmingham Classic, UK	WTA 250	Grass	(Czech Republic) Barbora Krejčíková	7–6^{(10–8)}, 6–4
Win	7–8	Jan 2024	Adelaide International, Australia	WTA 500	Hard	Daria Kasatkina	6–3, 6–2
Win	8–8	Feb 2024	Ladies Linz, Austria	WTA 500	Hard (i)	Ekaterina Alexandrova	6–2, 6–3
Loss	8–9	Feb 2025	Qatar Ladies Open	WTA 1000	Hard	(United States) Amanda Anisimova	4–6, 3–6
Win	9–9	Apr 2025	Stuttgart Open, Germany	WTA 500	Clay (i)	Aryna Sabalenka	6–4, 6–1

=== Doubles: 25 (12 titles, 13 runner-ups) ===
Legend Grand Slam (1–3) Premier M & Premier 5 / WTA 1000 (2–4) Premier / WTA 500 (8–5) International / WTA 250 (1–1)	Finals by surface Hard (8–9) Clay (2–2) Grass (2–2)	Finals by setting Outdoor (9–12) Indoor (3–1)

Result	W–L	Date	Tournament	Tier	Surface	Partner	Opponents	Score
Win	1–0	Feb 2017	St. Petersburg Trophy, Russia	Premier	Hard (i)	(Poland) Alicja Rosolska	(Croatia) Darija Jurak (Switzerland) Xenia Knoll	3–6, 6–2, [10–5]
Win	2–0	Apr 2017	Stuttgart Grand Prix, Germany	Premier	Clay (i)	(United States) Raquel Atawo	(United States) Abigail Spears (Slovenia) Katarina Srebotnik	6–4, 6–4
Win	3–0	Feb 2018	Qatar Ladies Open, Qatar	Premier 5	Hard	(Canada) Gabriela Dabrowski	(Slovenia) Andreja Klepač (Spain) María José Martínez Sánchez	6–3, 6–3
Loss	3–1	Jul 2019	Baltic Open, Latvia	International	Clay	(Kazakhstan) Galina Voskoboeva	(Canada) Sharon Fichman (Serbia) Nina Stojanović	6–2, 6–7^{(1–7)}, [6–10]
Loss	3–2	Sep 2019	China Open, China	Premier M	Hard	(Ukraine) Dayana Yastremska	(United States) Sofia Kenin (United States) Bethanie Mattek-Sands	3–6, 7–6^{(7–5)}, [7–10]
Loss	3–3	Feb 2020	Qatar Ladies Open, Qatar	Premier 5	Hard	(Canada) Gabriela Dabrowski	(Chinese Taipei) Hsieh Su-wei (Czech Republic) Barbora Strýcová	2–6, 7–5, [2–10]
Loss	3–4	Mar 2021	Qatar Ladies Open	WTA 500	Hard	(Romania) Monica Niculescu	(United States) Nicole Melichar (Netherlands) Demi Schuurs	2–6, 6–2, [8–10]
Win	4–4	Oct 2021	Kremlin Cup, Russia	WTA 500	Hard (i)	(Czech Republic) Kateřina Siniaková	(Ukraine) Nadiia Kichenok (Romania) Raluca Olaru	6–2, 4–6, [10–8]
Loss	4–5	Feb 2022	Dubai Championships, UAE	WTA 500	Hard	(Ukraine) Lyudmyla Kichenok	(Russia) Veronika Kudermetova (Belgium) Elise Mertens	1–6, 3–6
Win	5–5	Jun 2022	Birmingham Classic, UK	WTA 250	Grass	(Ukraine) Lyudmyla Kichenok	(Belgium) Elise Mertens (China) Zhang Shuai	w/o
Loss	5–6	Jun 2022	Eastbourne International, UK	WTA 250	Grass	(Ukraine) Lyudmyla Kichenok	(Serbia) Aleksandra Krunić (Poland) Magda Linette	w/o
Win	6–6	Aug 2022	Cincinnati Open, US	WTA 1000	Hard	(Ukraine) Lyudmyla Kichenok	(United States) Nicole Melichar-Martinez (Australia) Ellen Perez	7–6^{(7–5)}, 6–3
Loss	6–7	Feb 2023	Qatar Ladies Open, Qatar	WTA 500	Hard	(Ukraine) Lyudmyla Kichenok	(United States) Coco Gauff (United States) Jessica Pegula	4–6, 6–2, [7–10]
Win	7–7	Jan 2024	Brisbane International, Australia	WTA 500	Hard	(Ukraine) Lyudmyla Kichenok	(Belgium) Greet Minnen (United Kingdom) Heather Watson	7–5, 6–2
Loss	7–8	Jan 2024	Australian Open, Australia	Grand Slam	Hard	(Ukraine) Lyudmyla Kichenok	(Chinese Taipei) Hsieh Su-wei (Belgium) Elise Mertens	1–6, 5–7
Win	8–8	Jun 2024	Eastbourne International, UK	WTA 500	Grass	(Ukraine) Lyudmyla Kichenok	(Canada) Gabriela Dabrowski (New Zealand) Erin Routliffe	5–7, 7–6^{(7–2)}, [10–8]
Win	9–8	Sep 2024	US Open, United States	Grand Slam	Hard	(Ukraine) Lyudmyla Kichenok	(France) Kristina Mladenovic (China) Zhang Shuai	6–4, 6–3
Loss	9–9	Jan 2025	Australian Open, Australia	Grand Slam	Hard	(Chinese Taipei) Hsieh Su-wei	(Czech Republic) Kateřina Siniaková (United States) Taylor Townsend	2–6, 7–6^{(7–4)}, 3–6
Win	10–9	Feb 2025	Abu Dhabi Open, UAE	WTA 500	Hard	(Australia) Ellen Perez	(France) Kristina Mladenovic (China) Zhang Shuai	6–2, 6–1
Loss	10–10	Feb 2025	Dubai Open, UAE	WTA 1000	Hard	(Chinese Taipei) Hsieh Su-Wei	(Czech Republic) Kateřina Siniaková (United States) Taylor Townsend	6–7^{(5–7)}, 4–6
Win	11–10	Mar 2025	Charleston Open, US	WTA 500	Clay	(New Zealand) Erin Routliffe	(United States) Caroline Dolehide (United States) Desirae Krawczyk	6–4, 6–2
Loss	11–11	Jul 2025	Wimbledon, UK	Grand Slam	Grass	(Chinese Taipei) Hsieh Su-Wei	Veronika Kudermetova (Belgium) Elise Mertens	6–3, 2–6, 4–6
Win	12–11	Jan 2026	Brisbane International, Australia (2)	WTA 500	Hard	(Chinese Taipei) Hsieh Su-Wei	(Spain) Cristina Bucșa (Australia) Ellen Perez	6–2, 6–1
Loss	12–12	Feb 2026	Qatar Ladies Open, Qatar	WTA 1000	Hard	(Chinese Taipei) Hsieh Su-Wei	(Kazakhstan) Anna Danilina (Serbia) Aleksandra Krunić	6–0, 6–7^{(3–7)}, [8–10]
Loss	12–13	Apr 2026	Stuttgart Grand Prix, Germany	WTA 500	Clay (i)	(China) Zhang Shuai	(United States) Nicole Melichar-Martinez; Liudmila Samsonova	1–6, 1–6

== ITF Circuit finals ==
=== Singles: 10 (7 titles, 3 runner-ups) ===
Legend $75,000 tournaments (0–1) $50,000 tournaments (1–1) $25,000 tournaments (0–1) $10,000 tournaments (6–0)	Finals by surface Hard (3–1) Clay (3–1) Carpet (1–1)

Result	W–L	Date	Tournament	Tier	Surface	Opponent	Score
Win	1–0	Oct 2012	ITF Stockholm, Sweden	10,000	Hard (i)	(Sweden) Ellen Allgurin	6–1, 6–3
Win	2–0	Feb 2013	ITF Helsingborg, Sweden	10,000	Carpet (i)	(Sweden) Ellen Allgurin	6–2, 7–6^{(7–3)}
Win	3–0	Nov 2013	ITF Helsinki, Finland	10,000	Hard (i)	(Sweden) Susanne Celik	7–5, 4–6, 7–5
Win	4–0	Apr 2014	ITF Pula, Italy	10,000	Clay	(France) Jade Suvrijn	7–6^{(7–4)}, 6–1
Win	5–0	Apr 2014	ITF Pula, Italy	10,000	Clay	(Spain) Yvonne Cavallé Reimers	6–2, 7–5
Win	6–0	Apr 2014	ITF Pula, Italy	10,000	Clay	(Italy) Alice Balducci	4–6, 7–6^{(7–1)}, 6–3
Loss	6–1	Nov 2014	ITF Zawada, Poland	25,000	Carpet (i)	(France) Océane Dodin	5–7, 4–6
Win	7–1	Feb 2015	Neva Cup St. Petersburg, Russia	50,000	Hard (i)	(Romania) Patricia Maria Țig	3–6, 7–5, 6–2
Loss	7–2	Mar 2015	Blossom Cup, China	50,000	Hard	(Russia) Elizaveta Kulichkova	1–6, 7–5, 5–7
Loss	7–3	Jul 2015	Warsaw Open, Poland	75,000	Clay	(Czech Republic) Petra Cetkovská	6–3, 5–7, 2–6

=== Doubles: 9 (8 titles, 1 runner-up) ===
Legend $75,000 tournaments (0–1) $25,000 tournaments (3–0) $10,000 tournaments (5–0)	Finals by surface Hard (4–0) Clay (2–1) Carpet (2–0)

Result	W–L	Date	Tournament	Tier	Surface	Partner	Opponents	Score
Win	1–0	Oct 2012	ITF Stockholm, Sweden	10,000	Hard (i)	(Sweden) Donika Bashota	(Russia) Maria Mokh (Estonia) Eva Paalma	7–6^{(7–4)}, 6–1
Win	2–0	Feb 2013	ITF Helsingborg, Sweden	10,000	Carpet (i)	(Sweden) Ellen Allgurin	(Sweden) Cornelia Lister (Netherlands) Lisanne van Riet	6–2, 6–7^{(4–7)}, [10–7]
Win	3–0	Mar 2013	ITF Tallinn, Estonia	25,000	Hard (i)	(Estonia) Anett Kontaveit	(Ukraine) Lyudmyla Kichenok (Ukraine) Nadiia Kichenok	2–6, 7–5, [10–0]
Win	4–0	Jul 2013	ITF Imola, Italy	25,000	Carpet	(Ukraine) Lyudmyla Kichenok	(Philippines) Katharina Lehnert (Italy) Alice Matteucci	6–4, 3–6, [10–3]
Win	5–0	Nov 2013	ITF Helsinki, Finland	10,000	Hard (i)	(Estonia) Eva Paalma	(Netherlands) Quirine Lemoine (Czech Republic) Martina Přádová	6–2, 5–7, [11–9]
Win	6–0	Apr 2014	ITF Pula, Italy	10,000	Clay	(Japan) Mana Ayukawa	(Italy) Alice Balducci (Romania) Diana Buzean	7–5, 3–6, [10–5]
Win	7–0	Apr 2014	ITF Pula, Italy	10,000	Clay	(Netherlands) Rosalie van der Hoek	(Spain) Yvonne Cavallé Reimers (Spain) Olga Sáez Larra	6–1, 2–6, [10–6]
Win	8–0	Jan 2015	Open Andrézieux-Bouthéon, France	25,000	Hard (i)	(Italy) Gioia Barbieri	(Netherlands) Lesley Kerkhove (Croatia) Ana Vrljić	2–6, 7–6^{(7–4)}, [10–3]
Loss	8–1	Jul 2015	Warsaw Open, Poland	75,000	Clay	(Sweden) Cornelia Lister	(Netherlands) Kiki Bertens (Netherlands) Richèl Hogenkamp	6–7^{(2–7)}, 4–6

== Junior Grand Slam finals ==
=== Singles: 1 (title) ===
Result	Year	Tournament	Surface	Opponent	Score
Win	2014	Wimbledon	Grass	(Slovakia) Kristína Schmiedlová	2–6, 6–3, 6–0

== National representation ==
=== Billie Jean King Cup ===
Legend	Meaning
Z RR / Z PO (13–9)	Zone group round robin / play-off

==== Singles: 35 (22–13) ====
Edition	Stage	Date	Location	Against	Surface	Opponent	W/L	Score
2013	Z2 RR	Apr 2013	Ulcinj, Montenegro	Finland	Clay	Ella Leivo	W	6–0, 6–1
2013	Z2 RR	Apr 2013	Ulcinj, Montenegro	Estonia	Clay	Julia Matojan	W	6–1, 6–1
2013	Z2 RR	Apr 2013	Ulcinj, Montenegro	Tunisia	Clay	Nour Abbès	W	6–1, 6–1
2013	Z2 PO	Apr 2013	Ulcinj, Montenegro	Montenegro	Clay	Ana Veselinović	W	7–5, 6–2
2014	Z1 RR	Feb 2014	Budapest, Hungary	(United Kingdom) Great Britain	Hard (i)	Heather Watson	L	5–7, 1–6
2014	Z1 RR	Feb 2014	Budapest, Hungary	Hungary	Hard (i)	Réka-Luca Jani	L	0–6, 4–6
2014	Z1 RR	Feb 2014	Budapest, Hungary	Romania	Hard (i)	Irina-Camelia Begu	L	3–6, 3–6
2014	Z1 PO	Feb 2014	Budapest, Hungary	Slovenia	Hard (i)	Dalila Jakupović	W	6–3, 7–6^{(11–9)}
2015	Z1 RR	Feb 2015	Budapest, Hungary	Belgium	Hard (i)	Kirsten Flipkens	L	2–6, 6–4, 3–6
2015	Z1 RR	Feb 2015	Budapest, Hungary	Croatia	Hard (i)	Donna Vekić	W	6–3, 6–1
2015	Z1 RR	Feb 2015	Budapest, Hungary	Israel	Hard (i)	Julia Glushko	L	5–7, 3–6
2015	Z1 PO	Feb 2015	Budapest, Hungary	Austria	Hard (i)	Julia Grabher	W	6–2, 6–1
2016	Z1 RR	Feb 2016	Eilat, Israel	Belgium	Hard	Alison Van Uytvanck	L	2–6, 6–3, 1–6
2016	Z1 RR	Feb 2016	Eilat, Israel	Bulgaria	Hard	Tsvetana Pironkova	L	0–6, 2–6
2016	Z1 RR	Feb 2016	Eilat, Israel	Hungary	Hard	Réka-Luca Jani	W	6–3, 6–2
2017	Z1 RR	Feb 2017	Tallinn, Estonia	Turkey	Hard (i)	Çağla Büyükakçay	W	7–6^{(7–4)}, 5–7, 6–3
2017	Z1 RR	Feb 2017	Tallinn, Estonia	(United Kingdom) Great Britain	Hard (i)	Johanna Konta	L	2–6, 3–6
2017	Z1 RR	Feb 2017	Tallinn, Estonia	Portugal	Hard (i)	Michelle Larcher de Brito	W	6–4, 6–2
2018	Z1 RR	Feb 2018	Tallinn, Estonia	Turkey	Hard (i)	Çağla Büyükakçay	L	2–6, 6–3, 3–6
2018	Z1 RR	Feb 2018	Tallinn, Estonia	Poland	Hard (i)	Magda Linette	W	6–3, 6–3
2018	Z1 RR	Feb 2018	Tallinn, Estonia	Austria	Hard (i)	Melanie Klaffner	W	2–6, 6–0, 6–3
2018	Z1 PO	Feb 2018	Tallinn, Estonia	Serbia	Hard (i)	Dejana Radanović	W	6–2, 6–1
2018	WG2 PO	Apr 2018	Khanty-Mansiysk, Russia	Russia	Clay (i)	Ekaterina Makarova	W	7–5, 6–4
2018	WG2 PO	Apr 2018	Khanty-Mansiysk, Russia	Russia	Clay (i)	Anastasia Pavlyuchenkova	W	7–5, 6–1
2019	WG2	Feb 2019	Riga, Latvia	Slovakia	Hard (i)	Rebecca Šramková	W	7–5, 6–7^{(5–7)}, 6–1
2019	WG PO	Apr 2019	Riga, Latvia	Germany	Hard (i)	Andrea Petkovic	L	5–7, 4–6
2019	WG PO	Apr 2019	Riga, Latvia	Germany	Hard (i)	Mona Barthel	L	4–6, 3–6
2020–21	F Q	Feb 2020	Everett, United States	United States	Hard (i)	Serena Williams	L	6–7^{(4–7)}, 6–7^{(3–7)}
2020–21	F Q	Feb 2020	Everett, United States	United States	Hard (i)	Sofia Kenin	W	6–3, 2–6, 6–2
2020–21	PO	Apr 2021	Jūrmala, Latvia	India	Hard (i)	Ankita Raina	W	6–2, 5–7, 7–5
2022	PO	Nov 2022	Schwechat, Austria	Austria	Clay (i)	Tamira Paszek	W	3–6, 6–2, 7–6^{(11–9)}
2022	PO	Nov 2022	Schwechat, Austria	Austria	Clay (i)	Sinja Kraus	W	6–0, 3–6, 6–1
2024	ZO RR	Apr 2024	Oeiras, Portugal	Portugal	Clay	Francisca Jorge	W	6–4, 4–6, 7–6^{(7–4)}
2024	ZO RR	Apr 2024	Oeiras, Portugal	Netherlands	Clay	Suzan Lamens	L	6–7^{(7–9)}, 4–6
2024	ZO RR	Apr 2024	Oeiras, Portugal	Turkey	Clay	Zeynep Sönmez	W	2–6, 7–5, 6–3

==== Doubles: 10 (6–4) ====
Edition	Stage	Date	Location	Against	Surface	Partner	Opponents	W/L	Score
2013	Z2 RR	Apr 2013	Ulcinj, Montenegro	Finland	Clay	Diāna Marcinkēviča	Ella Leivo; Tanja Tuomi	W	6–0, 6–3
2013	Z2 RR	Apr 2013	Ulcinj, Montenegro	Tunisia	Clay	Diāna Marcinkēviča	Nour Abbès; Ons Jabeur	L	3–6, 4–6
2013	Z2 PO	Apr 2013	Ulcinj, Montenegro	Montenegro	Clay	Diāna Marcinkēviča	Danka Kovinić; Danica Krstajić	W	2–6, 6–4, 6–4
2014	Z1 RR	Feb 2014	Budapest, Hungary	(United Kingdom) Great Britain	Hard (i)	Diāna Marcinkēviča	Jocelyn Rae; Heather Watson	W	1–6, 7–5, 7–6^{(7–5)}
2014	Z1 RR	Feb 2014	Budapest, Hungary	Hungary	Hard (i)	Diāna Marcinkēviča	Tímea Babos; Réka-Luca Jani	L	5–7, 6–3, 1–6
2014	Z1 RR	Feb 2014	Budapest, Hungary	Romania	Hard (i)	Dārta Elizabete Emuliņa	Sorana Cîrstea; Simona Halep	W	2–3 ret.
2015	Z1 RR	Feb 2015	Budapest, Hungary	Belgium	Hard (i)	Dārta Elizabete Emuliņa	An-Sophie Mestach; Alison Van Uytvanck	L	0–6, 5–7
2015	Z1 RR	Feb 2015	Budapest, Hungary	Croatia	Hard (i)	Diāna Marcinkēviča	Darija Jurak; Ana Konjuh	L	4–6, 3–6
2015	Z1 RR	Feb 2015	Budapest, Hungary	Israel	Hard (i)	Dārta Elizabete Emuliņa	Alona Pushkarevsky; Keren Shlomo	W	6–3, 2–6, 6–3
2015	Z1 PO	Feb 2015	Budapest, Hungary	Austria	Hard (i)	Diāna Marcinkēviča	Julia Grabher; Sandra Klemenschits	W	7–5, 6–3

== WTA Tour career earnings ==
Year	Titles			Earnings ($)	Rank
Year	Grand Slam	WTA	Total	Earnings ($)	Rank
2014	–	–	–	14,417	389
2015	–	–	–	214,080	132
2016	–	–	–	691,668	46
2017	1	3	4	3,998,026	6
2018	–	1	1	2,602,164	15
2019	–	1	1	1,123,812	38
2020	–	–	–	415,805	52
2021	–	2	2	1,091,204	29
2022	–	3	3	1,284,980	16
2023	–	2	2	2,158,610	15
2024	–	1	1	649,126	6
Career	1	13	14	14,583,054	36

- Note: Title counts include singles, doubles and mixed doubles titles.

== Career Grand Slam statistics ==
=== Grand Slam tournament seedings ===
The tournaments won by Ostapenko are in boldface, and advanced into finals by Ostapenko are in italics.

Legend seeded No. 4–10 (0 / 5) seeded No. 11–16 (0 / 8) seeded No. 17–32 (0 / 7) unseeded (**1** / 13) qualifier (0 / 1) wild card (0 / 1)	Longest streak 2 3 3 4 (Note: 2020 US Open was played before the 2020 French Open due to schedule change caused by COVID-19 outbreak) 1 1

Year	Australian Open	French Open	Wimbledon	US Open
2015	did not play	did not qualify	wild card	qualifier
2016	unseeded	32nd	unseeded	unseeded
2017	unseeded	**unseeded (1)**	13th	12th
2018	7th	5th	12th	10th
2019	22nd	unseeded	unseeded	unseeded
2020	unseeded	unseeded	cancelled	did not play
2021	unseeded	unseeded	unseeded	did not play
2022	26th	13th	12th	16th
2023	17th	17th	17th	20th
2024	11th	9th	13th	10th

=== Best Grand Slam results details ===
Grand Slam winners are in boldface, and runner–ups are in italics.

Australian Open
2023 (17th)
Round	Opponent	Rank	Score
1R	(Ukraine) Dayana Yastremska	101	6–4, 6–2
2R	(Hungary) Anna Bondár	81	7–6^{(7–5)}, 5–7, 6–0
3R	(Ukraine) Kateryna Baindl	95	6–3, 6–0
4R	(United States) Coco Gauff (7)	7	7–5, 6–3
QF	(Kazakhstan) Elena Rybakina (22)	25	2–6, 4–6

French Open
2017 (unseeded)
Round	Opponent	Rank	Score
1R	(United States) Louisa Chirico	128	4–6, 6–3, 6–4
2R	(Puerto Rico) Monica Puig	41	6–3, 6–2
3R	(Ukraine) Lesia Tsurenko	42	6–1, 6–4
4R	(Australia) Samantha Stosur (23)	22	2–6, 6–2, 6–4
QF	(Denmark) Caroline Wozniacki (11)	12	4–6, 6–2, 6–2
SF	(Switzerland) Timea Bacsinszky (30)	31	7–6^{(7–4)}, 3–6, 6–3
**W**	(Romania) Simona Halep (3)	4	4–6, 6–4, 6–3

Wimbledon Championships
2018 (12th)
Round	Opponent	Rank	Score
1R	(United Kingdom) Katy Dunne (WC)	212	6–3, 7–6^{(7–5)}
2R	(Belgium) Kirsten Flipkens	45	6–1, 6–3
3R	(Russia) Vitalia Diatchenko (Q)	132	6–0, 6–4
4R	(Belarus) Aliaksandra Sasnovich	50	7–6^{(7–4)}, 6–0
QF	(Slovakia) Dominika Cibulková	33	7–5, 6–4
SF	(Germany) **Angelique Kerber (11)**	10	3–6, 3–6

US Open
2023 (20th)
Round	Opponent	Rank	Score
1R	(Italy) Jasmine Paolini	35	6–2, 4–6, 6–1
2R	Elina Avanesyan	66	6–3, 5–7, 7–5
3R	(United States) Bernarda Pera	73	4–6, 6–3, 6–3
4R	(Poland) Iga Świątek (1)	1	3–6, 6–3, 6–1
QF	(United States) **Coco Gauff (6)**	6	0–6, 2–6

== Wins against top 10 players ==
- Ostapenko has a 28–36 (44%) record against players who were, at the time the match was played, ranked in the top 10.

No.	Player	Rk	Event	Surface	Rd	Score	Rk	Years	Ref
1.	(Spain) Carla Suárez Navarro	9	Wimbledon, United Kingdom	Grass	1R	6–2, 6–0	147	2015	
2.	(Czech Republic) Petra Kvitová	8	Qatar Open, Qatar	Hard	3R	5–7, 6–2, 6–1	88	2016	
3.	(Romania) Simona Halep	4	French Open, France	Clay	F	4–6, 6–4, 6–3	47	2017	
4.	(Ukraine) Elina Svitolina	5	Wimbledon, United Kingdom	Grass	4R	6–3, 7–6^{(8–6)}	13	2017	
5.	(Spain) Garbiñe Muguruza	1	Wuhan Open, China	Hard	QF	1–6, 6–3, 6–2	10	2017	
6.	(Czech Republic) Karolína Plíšková	3	WTA Finals, Singapore	Hard (i)	RR	6–3, 6–1	7	2017	
7.	(Czech Republic) Petra Kvitová	9	Miami Open, United States	Hard	4R	7–6^{(7–4)}, 6–3	5	2018	
8.	(Ukraine) Elina Svitolina	4	Miami Open, United States	Hard	QF	7–6^{(7–3)}, 7–6^{(7–5)}	5	2018	
9.	(United States) Sloane Stephens	9	Eastbourne International, UK	Grass	2R	1–6, 6–0, 6–3	35	2019	
10.	(Czech Republic) Karolína Plíšková	2	China Open, China	Hard	1R	7–5, 3–6, 7–5	73	2019	
11.	(United States) Sofia Kenin	7	Fed Cup, United States	Hard (i)	QR	6–3, 2–6, 6–2	40	2020	
12.	(Netherlands) Kiki Bertens	8	Internationaux de Strasbourg, France	Clay	2R	2–6, 6–4, 4–2 ret.	43	2020	
13.	(Czech Republic) Karolína Plíšková	4	French Open, France	Clay	2R	6–4, 6–2	43	2020	
14.	(Poland) Iga Świątek	4	Indian Wells Open, United States	Hard	4R	6–4, 6–3	29	2021	
15.	(Poland) Iga Świątek	9	Dubai Championships, UAE	Hard	2R	4–6, 6–1, 7–6^{(7–4)}	21	2022	
16.	(Czech Republic) Barbora Krejčíková	3	Qatar Open, Qatar	Hard	3R	6–3, 6–2	13	2022	
17.	(Spain) Garbiñe Muguruza	9	Qatar Open, Qatar	Hard	QF	6–2, 6–2	13	2022	
18.	(United States) Coco Gauff	7	Australian Open, Australia	Hard	4R	7–5, 6–3	17	2023	
19.	Daria Kasatkina	9	Italian Open, Italy	Clay	4R	6–4, 4–6, 6–0	20	2023	
20.	(Poland) Iga Świątek	1	US Open, United States	Hard	4R	3–6, 6–3, 6–1	21	2023	
21.	(United States) Jessica Pegula	4	China Open, China	Hard	3R	6–4, 6–2	17	2023	
22.	(Italy) Jasmine Paolini	4	Qatar Open, Qatar	Hard	3R	6–2, 6–2	37	2025	
23.	(Poland) Iga Świątek	2	Qatar Open, Qatar	Hard	SF	6–3, 6–1	37	2025	
24.	(Poland) Iga Świątek	2	Stuttgart Open, Germany	Clay (i)	QF	6–3, 3–6, 6–2	24	2025	
25.	Aryna Sabalenka	1	Stuttgart Open, Germany	Clay (i)	F	6–4, 6–1	24	2025	
26.	Ekaterina Alexandrova	10	Qatar Open, Qatar	Hard	QF	6–4, 6–2	24	2026	
27.	(Italy) Jasmine Paolini	7	Miami Open, United States	Hard	3R	5-7, 6–2, 7-5	24	2026	
28.	(United States) Jessica Pegula	4	Wuhan Open, China	Hard	2R	2-6, 7-6, 6-3	34	2026	

- Key: (Rk) first use, opponent rank; (Rd) round; (Rk) 2nd use, player rank; (Ref) reference; (F) final; (SF) semifinal; (QF) quarterfinal; (#R) rounds 4, 3, 2, 1; (RR) round-robin stage; (Q#) qualifying rounds or stages (3), 2, 1.
