= Ons Jabeur career statistics =

Career finals
Discipline	Type	Won	Lost	Total	WR (Note: Winning rate)
Singles	Grand Slam	0	3	3	0.00
Singles	WTA Finals	–	–	–	–
Singles	WTA Elite Trophy	–	–	–	–
Singles	WTA 1000 (Note: Formerly known as: Category 4 & 5 & 6 (until 1990); Tier I (until 2009); WTA Premier Mandatory and 5 (until 2021))	1	1	2	0.50
Singles	WTA 500 (Note: Formerly known as: Category 3 (until 1990); Tier II (until 2009); WTA Premier (until 2021))	2	3	5	0.40
Singles	WTA 250 (Note: Formerly known as: Category 1 & 2 (until 1990); Tier III & IV & V (until 2009); WTA International (until 2021))	2	1	3	0.67
Singles	Olympics	–	–	–	–
Singles	Total	5	8	13	0.38
Doubles	Grand Slam	–	–	–	–
Doubles	WTA Finals	–	–	–	–
Doubles	WTA Elite Trophy	–	–	–	–
Doubles	WTA 1000	–	–	–	–
Doubles	WTA 500	–	–	–	–
Doubles	WTA 250	0	1	1	0.00
Doubles	Olympics	–	–	–	–
Doubles	Total	0	1	1	0.00
Total		5	9	14	0.36

This is a list of the main career statistics of professional Tunisian tennis player Ons Jabeur. She is the most successful Arab and African player. Her success is reflected in that she became the first Arab player, male or female, to be ranked inside the world's top 10. In late June 2022, she climbed to the place of No. 2 at the WTA rankings as her best singles record up to date. In 2020, she became the first Arab woman to reach a major quarterfinal at the Australian Open. She went further in 2022, reaching two back-to-back major finals at Wimbledon and the US Open, respectively. So far, she has reached and won at least one tournament from all the WTA tiers (250, 500 & 1000). At the Madrid Open in 2022, she become the first Arab or African woman to win a WTA 1000 event. She has won five WTA Tour titles in total.

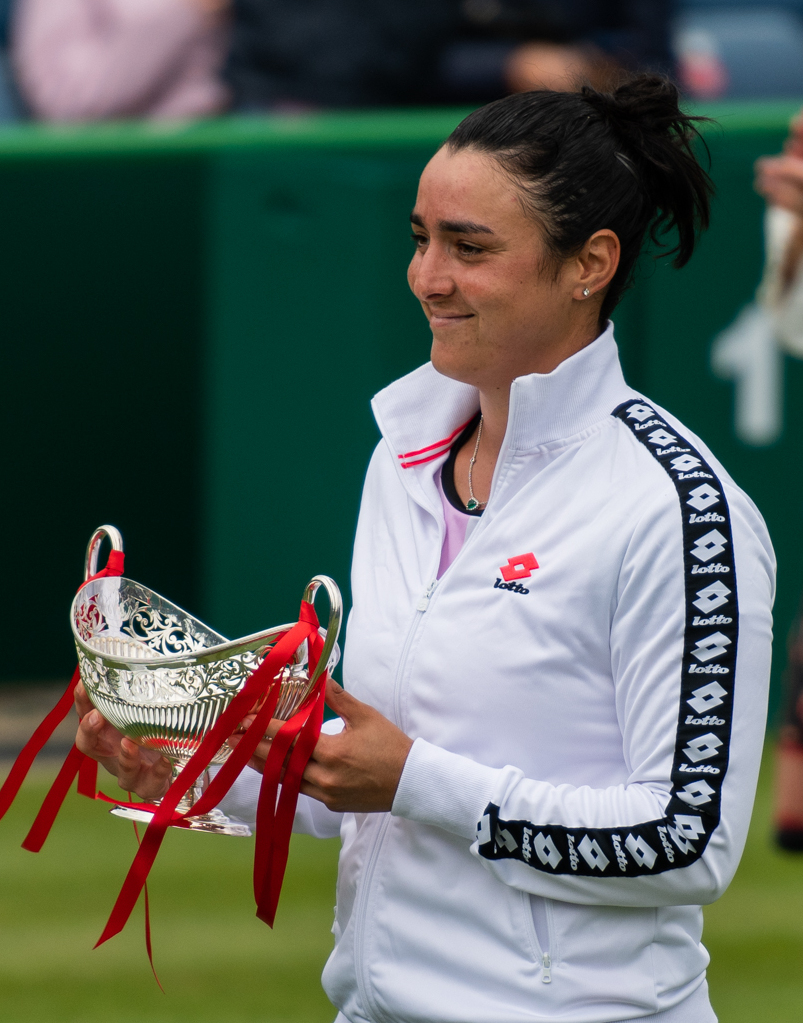
Jabeur holding trophy from the 2021 Birmingham Classic, her first WTA Tour singles title.

== Performance timelines ==
Key
W	F	SF	QF	#R	RR	Q#	DNQ	A	NH

(W) winner; (F) finalist; (SF) semifinalist; (QF) quarterfinalist; (#R) rounds 4, 3, 2, 1; (RR) round-robin stage; (Q#) qualification round; (DNQ) did not qualify; (A) absent; (NH) not held; (SR) strike rate (events won / competed); (W–L) win–loss record.
To avoid confusion and double counting, these charts are updated at the conclusion of a tournament or when the player's participation has ended.

Only main-draw results in WTA Tour, Grand Slam tournaments, BJK Cup (Fed Cup), United Cup, Hopman Cup and Olympic Games are included in win–loss records.

=== Singles ===
Current through the 2025 US OPen.

Tournament	2011	2012	2013	2014	2015	2016	2017	2018	2019	2020	2021	2022	2023	2024	2025	SR	W–L	Win %
Grand Slam tournaments
Australian Open	A	A	A	A	1R	A	Q3	1R	1R	QF	3R	A	2R	2R	3R	0 / 8	10–8	56%
French Open	A	Q2	A	Q1	Q2	A	3R	Q2	1R	4R	4R	1R	QF	QF	1R	0 / 8	16–8	67%
Wimbledon	A	A	Q1	Q3	A	Q1	1R	2R	1R	NH	QF	F	F	3R	1R	0 / 8	19–8	70%
US Open	A	A	Q1	1R	Q1	Q1	2R	1R	3R	3R	3R	F	4R	A	A	0 / 8	16–8	67%
Win–loss	0–0	0–0	0–0	0–1	0–1	0–0	3–3	1–3	2–4	9–3	11–4	12–3	14–4	7–3	2–3	0 / 32	61–32	66%
Year-end championships
WTA Finals	DNQ									NH	Alt/A	RR	RR	DNQ		0 / 2	2–4	33%
National representation
Summer Olympics	NH	1R	NH			1R	NH				1R	NH		A	NH	0 / 3	0–3	0%
Billie Jean King Cup	POZ3	POZ3	POZ2	A	A	Z3	Z3	POZ3	POZ2	POZ2 (Note: Edition is split into the two years due to COVID-19.)		A	A	A	A	0 / 0	28–5	85%
WTA 1000 tournaments
Qatar Open	NTI	1R	1R	A	NTI	Q1	NTI	1R	NTI	QF	NTI	QF	NTI	2R	QF	0 / 7	8–7	53%
Dubai Championships	A	NTI			A	NTI	2R	NTI	2R	NTI	3R	NTI	A	A	1R	0 / 4	4–4	50%
Indian Wells Open	A	A	A	A	2R	A	A	Q1	1R	NH	SF	2R	3R	2R	2R	0 / 7	6–7	46%
Miami Open	A	A	A	A	Q1	A	A	Q1	2R	NH	4R	4R	2R	2R	3R	0 / 6	6–6	50%
Madrid Open	A	A	A	A	A	A	A	A	A	NH	3R	W	A	QF	2R	1 / 4	11–3	79%
Italian Open	A	A	A	A	A	A	A	A	Q2	1R	A	F	2R	2R	3R	0 / 5	5–5	50%
Canadian Open	A	A	A	A	A	A	A	A	Q2	NH	QF	2R	A	1R	A	0 / 3	3–3	50%
Cincinnati Open	A	A	A	A	A	A	A	A	1R	QF	3R	3R	QF	A	A	0 / 5	8–5	62%
Guadalajara Open	NH											A	3R	NTI		0 / 1	1–1	50%
China Open	A	A	A	A	A	A	Q2	2R	Q1	NH			2R	A	A	0 / 2	2–2	50%
Pan Pacific / Wuhan Open (Note: In 2014, the Pan Pacific Open was downgraded to a Premier event and replaced by the Wuhan Open. The Premier 5 tournaments were reclassified as WTA 1000 tournaments in 2021.)	A	A	A	A	A	A	1R	A	2R	NH				A	A	0 / 2	1–2	33%
Win–loss	0–0	0–1	0–1	0–0	1–1	0–0	1–2	1–2	3–5	6–3	15–6	16–6	5–6	3–6	4–6	1 / 46	55–45	55%
Career statistics
	2011	2012	2013	2014	2015	2016	2017	2018	2019	2020	2021	2022	2023	2024	2025	SR	W–L	Win %
Tournaments	0 (Note: During the season, she did not play in the main draw of any tour-level tournaments. However, she played at the Billie Jean King Cup, which is not counted as a played tournament but matches counted.)	2	3	7	5	3	11	12	19	11	20	18	18	14	14	Career total: 157		
Titles	0	0	0	0	0	0	0	0	0	0	1	2	2	0	0	Career total: 5		
Finals	0	0	0	0	0	0	0	1	0	0	3	6	3	0	0	Career total: 13		
Hard win–loss	0–0	0–1	3–3	1–5	1–5	0–1	5–7	11–9	12–15	22–9	25–13	19–12	18–11	2–6	12–8	1 / 104	131–105	56%
Clay win–loss	3–2	6–0	4–0	1–2	0–0	2–4	6–2	2–2	0–1	3–2	13–4	17–4	11–3	8–5	0–3	2 / 32	76–34	69%
Grass win–loss	0–0	0–1	0–0	0–0	0–0	0–0	0–2	1–1	5–3	0–0	10–2	11–1	7–3	6–3	2–3	2 / 21	42–19	69%
Overall win–loss	3–2	6–2	7–3	2–7	1–5	2–5	11–11	14–12	17–19	25–11	48–19	47–17	36–17	16–14	14–14	5 / 157	249–158	61%
Win (%)	60%	75%	70%	22%	17%	29%	50%	54%	47%	69%	72%	73%	68%	53%	50%	Career total: 61.18%		
Year-end ranking (Note: 2010: WTA ranking–601.)	1209	264	139	146	210	193	88	62	77	31	10	2	6	42	79	$14,176,821		

=== Doubles ===
Current through the 2025 Berlin Open.

Tournament	2012	...	2016	2017	2018	2019	2020	2021	2022	2023	2024	2025	SR	W–L	Win %
Grand Slam tournaments
Australian Open	A		A	A	A	A	3R	2R	A	A	A	A	0 / 2	3–2	60%
French Open	A		A	A	A	A	A	A	A	A	A	A	0 / 0	0–0	–
Wimbledon	A		A	A	A	1R	NH	A	A	A	A	A	0 / 1	0–1	0%
US Open	A		A	A	A	2R	A	A	A	A	A	A	0 / 1	1–1	50%
Win–loss	0–0		0–0	0–0	0–0	1–2	2–1	1–1	0–0	0–0	0–0	0–0	0 / 4	4–4	50%
WTA 1000 tournaments
Qatar Open	1R		1R	NMS	1R	NMS	A	NMS	A	NMS	A	A	0 / 3	0–3	0%
Dubai Championships	NMS		NMS	A	NMS	2R (Note: Withdrew during the tournament. Not counted as a loss.)	NMS	A	NMS	A	A	A	0 / 1	1–0	100%
Indian Wells Open	A		A	A	A	A	NH	A	A	A	A	1R	0 / 1	0–1	0%
Miami Open	A		A	A	A	A	NH	A	A	1R	A	A	0 / 1	0–1	0%
Madrid Open	A		A	A	A	A	NH	A	A	A	A	A	0 / 0	0–0	–
Italian Open	A		A	A	A	A	A	A	A	A	A	A	0 / 0	0–0	–
Canadian Open	A		A	A	A	A	NH	A	A	A	A	A	0 / 0	0–0	–
Cincinnati Open	A		A	A	A	A	A	1R	QF	1R	A	A	0 / 3	2–3	40%
Guadalajara Open	NTI/NH								A	2R	NTI		0 / 1	1–1	50%
China Open	A		A	A	A	A	NH			A	A	A	0 / 0	0–0	–
Pan Pacific / Wuhan Open	A		A	A	A	A	NH				A	A	0 / 0	0–0	–
Career statistics
Tournaments	1		2	0	1	4	1	5	5	3	3	3	Career total: 28		
Titles	0		0	0	0	0	0	0	0	0	0	0	Career total: 0		
Finals	0		0	0	0	0	0	1	0	0	0	0	Career total: 1		
Overall win–loss	0–1		0–2	0–0	0–1	4–3	2–1	6–5	4–4	1–3	2–1	3–2	0 / 28	22–23	49%
Year-end ranking	n/a		n/a	835	n/a	179	215	160	258	532	348	261			

== Grand Slam tournaments ==
=== Singles: 3 (3 runner-ups) ===
Result	Year	Championship	Surface	Opponent	Score
Loss	2022	Wimbledon	Grass	(Kazakhstan) Elena Rybakina	6–3, 2–6, 2–6
Loss	2022	US Open	Hard	(Poland) Iga Świątek	2–6, 6–7^{(5–7)}
Loss	2023	Wimbledon	Grass	(Czech Republic) Markéta Vondroušová	4–6, 4–6

== Other significant finals ==
=== WTA 1000 tournaments ===
==== Singles: 2 (1 title, 1 runner-up) ====
Result	Year	Tournament	Surface	Opponent	Score
Win	2022	Madrid Open	Clay	(United States) Jessica Pegula	7–5, 0–6, 6–2
Loss	2022	Italian Open	Clay	(Poland) Iga Świątek	2–6, 2–6

== WTA Tour finals ==
=== Singles: 13 (5 titles, 8 runner-ups) ===
Legend Grand Slam (0–3) WTA 1000 (1–1) WTA 500 / Premier (2–3) WTA 250 (2–1)	Finals by surface Hard (1–3) Clay (2–3) Grass (2–2)	Finals by setting Outdoor (5–7) Indoor (0–1)

Result	W–L	Date	Tournament	Tier	Surface	Opponent	Score
Loss	0–1	Oct 2018	Kremlin Cup, Russia	Premier	Hard (i)	(Russia) Daria Kasatkina	6–2, 6–7^{(3–7)}, 4–6
Loss	0–2	Apr 2021	Charleston International, United States	WTA 250	Clay (green)	(Australia) Astra Sharma	6–2, 5–7, 1–6
Win	1–2	Jun 2021	Birmingham Classic, United Kingdom	WTA 250	Grass	(Russia) Daria Kasatkina	7–5, 6–4
Loss	1–3	Oct 2021	Chicago Fall Classic, United States	WTA 500	Hard	(Spain) Garbiñe Muguruza	6–3, 3–6, 0–6
Loss	1–4	Apr 2022	Charleston Open, United States	WTA 500	Clay (green)	(Switzerland) Belinda Bencic	1–6, 7–5, 4–6
Win	2–4	May 2022	Madrid Open, Spain	WTA 1000	Clay	(United States) Jessica Pegula	7–5, 0–6, 6–2
Loss	2–5	May 2022	Italian Open, Italy	WTA 1000	Clay	(Poland) Iga Świątek	2–6, 2–6
Win	3–5	Jun 2022	Berlin Open, Germany	WTA 500	Grass	(Switzerland) Belinda Bencic	6–3, 2–1 ret.
Loss	3–6	Jul 2022	Wimbledon, United Kingdom	Grand Slam	Grass	(Kazakhstan) Elena Rybakina	6–3, 2–6, 2–6
Loss	3–7	Sep 2022	US Open, United States	Grand Slam	Hard	(Poland) Iga Świątek	2–6, 6–7^{(5–7)}
Win	4–7	Apr 2023	Charleston Open, United States	WTA 500	Clay (green)	(Switzerland) Belinda Bencic	7–6^{(8–6)}, 6–4
Loss	4–8	Jul 2023	Wimbledon, United Kingdom	Grand Slam	Grass	(Czech Republic) Markéta Vondroušová	4–6, 4–6
Win	5–8	Sep 2023	Ningbo Open, China	WTA 250	Hard	Diana Shnaider	6–2, 6–1

=== Doubles: 1 (runner-up) ===
Legend Grand Slam WTA 1000 WTA 500 WTA 250 (0–1)	Finals by surface Hard (0–0) Clay (0–0) Grass (0–1)	Finals by setting Outdoor (0–1) Indoor

Result	Date	Tournament	Tier	Surface	Partner	Opponents	Score
Loss	Jun 2021	Birmingham Classic, United Kingdom	WTA 250	Grass	(Australia) Ellen Perez	(Czech Republic) Marie Bouzková (Czech Republic) Lucie Hradecká	4–6, 6–2, [8–10]

== ITF Circuit finals ==
=== Singles: 15 (11 titles, 4 runner-ups) ===
Legend $100,000 tournaments (1–0) $50,000 tournaments (4–1) $25,000 tournaments (4–2) $10,000 tournaments (2–1)	Legend Hard (1–3) Clay (7–1) Grass (1–0) Carpet (2–0)

Result	W–L	Date	Tournament	Tier	Surface	Opponent	Score
Loss	0–1	Oct 2009	ITF Monastir, Tunisia	10,000	Hard	(Netherlands) Elise Tamaëla	2–6, 2–6
Win	1–1	Apr 2010	ITF Antalya, Turkey	10,000	Clay	(Poland) Sandra Zaniewska	2–1 ret.
Win	2–1	Jul 2010	ITF Casablanca, Morocco	10,000	Clay	(Russia) Anna Morgina	7–5, 6–3
Loss	2–2	Apr 2012	Nana Trophy, Tunisia	25,000	Clay	(Poland) Sandra Zaniewska	4–6, 6–4, 2–6
Win	3–2	Apr 2013	ITF Tunis, Tunisia	25,000	Clay	(Spain) Sara Sorribes Tormo	6–3, 6–2
Win	4–2	May 2013	Fukuoka International, Japan	50,000	Carpet	(Belgium) An-Sophie Mestach	7–6^{(7–2)}, 6–2
Win	5–2	May 2013	Kurume Cup, Japan	50,000	Carpet	(Belgium) An-Sophie Mestach	6–0, 6–2
Win	6–2	Oct 2013	Challenger de Saguenay, Canada	50,000	Hard (i)	(United States) CoCo Vandeweghe	6–7^{(0–7)}, 6–0, 6–3
Win	7–2	May 2014	Nana Trophy, Tunisia (2)	25,000	Clay	(Russia) Valeria Savinykh	6–3, 7–6^{(7–4)}
Loss	7–3	Aug 2014	Landisville Tennis Challenge, United States	25,000	Hard	(Poland) Paula Kania	7–5, 3–6, 4–6
Loss	7–4	Oct 2014	Open Nantes, France	50,000	Hard (i)	(Czech Republic) Kateřina Siniaková	5–7, 2–6
Win	8–4	Jan 2016	ITF Daytona Beach, US	25,000	Clay	(Ukraine) Olga Fridman	0–6, 6–2, 6–4
Win	9–4	Jan 2016	ITF Sunrise, US	25,000	Clay	(United States) Anna Tatishvili	3–6, 6–2, 6–1
Win	10–4	May 2016	Nana Trophy, Tunisia (3)	50,000	Clay	(Switzerland) Romina Oprandi	1–6, 6–2, 6–2
Win	11–4	Jun 2018	Manchester Trophy, UK	100,000	Grass	(Spain) Sara Sorribes Tormo	6–2, 6–1

=== Doubles: 2 (1 title, 1 runner-up) ===
Legend $25,000 tournaments $10,000 tournaments (1–1)	Legend Hard (0–1) Clay (1–0)

Result	W–L	Date	Tournament	Tier	Surface	Partner	Opponents	Score
Loss	0–1	Oct 2009	ITF Monastir, Tunisia	10,000	Hard	(Tunisia) Nour Abbès	(Netherlands) Elise Tamaëla (Netherlands) Nicole Thyssen	1–6, 7–5, [4–10]
Win	1–1	Jul 2010	ITF Casablanca, Morocco	10,000	Clay	(Slovakia) Katarína Baranová	(Russia) Galina Fokina (Russia) Anna Morgina	6–3, 6–3

== Junior Grand Slam tournament finals ==
=== Singles: 2 (1 title, 1 runner-up) ===
Result	Year	Tournament	Surface	Opponent	Score
Loss	2010	French Open	Clay	(Ukraine) Elina Svitolina	2–6, 5–7
Win	2011	French Open	Clay	(Puerto Rico) Monica Puig	7–6^{(10–8)}, 6–1

== Billie Jean King Cup participations ==
Jabeur made her debut at the Fed Cup in 2011 playing for Tunisia in the Zone Group III. Since then, she has gained a singles record of 28–5, and a doubles record of 9–8.

Legend	Meaning
Z RR / Z PO (37–13)	Zone group round robin / play-off

=== Singles: 33 (28–5) ===
Edition	Stage	Date	Location	Against	Surface	Opponent	W/L	Score
2011	ZO3 RR	May 2011	Cairo, Egypt	Egypt	Clay	Menna El-Nagdy	W	6–0, 6–4
2011	ZO3 RR	May 2011	Cairo, Egypt	Moldova	Clay	Iulia Helbet	W	6–3, 6–4
2011	ZO3 RR	May 2011	Cairo, Egypt	Norway	Clay	Ulrikke Eikeri	L	6–7, 4–6
2011	ZO3 RR	May 2011	Cairo, Egypt	(Republic of Ireland) Ireland	Clay	Amy Bowtell	W	6–2, 6–3
2011	ZO3 PO	May 2011	Cairo, Egypt	Montenegro	Clay	Danka Kovinić	L	3–6, 2–6
2012	ZO3 RR	Apr 2012	Cairo, Egypt	Moldova	Clay	Iulia Helbet	W	6–2, 6–1
2012	ZO3 RR	Apr 2012	Cairo, Egypt	Cyprus	Clay	Joanna-Nena Savva	W	6–2, 6–1
2012	ZO3 RR	Apr 2012	Cairo, Egypt	Namibia	Clay	Kerstin Gressmann	W	6–2, 6–1
2012	ZO3 RR	Apr 2012	Cairo, Egypt	Egypt	Clay	Mai El Kamash	W	6–3, 6–1
2012	ZO3 RR	Apr 2012	Cairo, Egypt	Lithuania	Clay	Lina Stančiūtė	W	6–1, 6–7, 6–0
2012	ZO3 PO	Apr 2012	Cairo, Egypt	(Republic of Ireland) Ireland	Clay	Amy Bowtell	W	6–3, 7–5
2013	ZO2 RR	Apr 2013	Ulcinj, Montenegro	Estonia	Clay	Eva Paalma	W	6–2, 6–2
2013	ZO2 RR	Apr 2013	Ulcinj, Montenegro	Finland	Clay	Piia Suomalainen	W	6–4, 6–0
2013	ZO2 RR	Apr 2013	Ulcinj, Montenegro	Latvia	Clay	Diāna Marcinkēviča	W	6–4, 6–3
2013	ZO2 PO	Apr 2013	Ulcinj, Montenegro	Lithuania	Clay	Lina Stančiūtė	W	6–3, 6–0
2016	ZO3 RR	Apr 2016	Ulcinj, Montenegro	Luxembourg	Clay	Mandy Minella	L	3–6, 6–4, 4–6
2016	ZO3 RR	Apr 2016	Ulcinj, Montenegro	Malta	Clay	Elaine Genovese	W	6–1, 6–1
2016	ZO3 RR	Apr 2016	Ulcinj, Montenegro	Greece	Clay	Maria Sakkari	L	3–6, 3–6
2016	ZO3 PO	Apr 2016	Ulcinj, Montenegro	Cyprus	Clay	Eliza Omirou	W	6–3, 6–2
2017	ZO3 RR	Jun 2017	Chișinău, Moldova	North Macedonia	Clay	Katarina Marinkovikj	W	6–1, 1–2 ret.
2017	ZO3 RR	Jun 2017	Chișinău, Moldova	Finland	Clay	Piia Suomalainen	W	6–1, 4–6, 6–1
2018	ZO3 RR	Apr 2018	Tunis, Tunisia	Algeria	Hard	Amira Benaissa	W	6–1, 6–3
2018	ZO3 RR	Apr 2018	Tunis, Tunisia	Madagascar	Hard	Iariniaina Tsantaniony	W	6–0, 6–2
2018	ZO3 RR	Apr 2018	Tunis, Tunisia	Cyprus	Hard	Eleni Louka	W	6–2, 6–0
2018	ZO3 PO	Apr 2018	Tunis, Tunisia	Lithuania	Hard	Joana Eidukonytė	W	6–2, 6–3
2019	ZO2 RR	Feb 2019	Esch-sur-Alzette, Luxembourg	Austria	Hard (i)	Barbara Haas	W	1–6, 6–2, 6–0
2019	ZO2 RR	Feb 2019	Esch-sur-Alzette, Luxembourg	(Bosnia and Herzegovina) BiH	Hard (i)	Dea Herdželaš	W	6–0, 6–4
2019	ZO2 PO	Feb 2019	Esch-sur-Alzette, Luxembourg	Luxembourg	Hard (i)	Mandy Minella	L	5–7, 1–6
2020–21	ZO2 RR	Feb 2020	Helsinki, Finland	Moldova	Hard (i)	Anastasia Vdovenco	W	6–2, 6–0
2020–21	ZO2 RR	Feb 2020	Helsinki, Finland	Israel	Hard (i)	Vlada Katic	W	6–4, 6–0
2020–21	ZO2 RR	Feb 2020	Helsinki, Finland	(Georgia (country)) Georgia	Hard (i)	Mariam Bolkvadze	W	6–2, 6–2
2020–21	ZO2 PO	Feb 2020	Helsinki, Finland	Denmark	Hard (i)	Clara Tauson	W	6–4, 6–4

== WTA Tour career earnings ==
Current after 2025 Wimbledon Championships.

Year	Grand Slam titles (Note: Includes singles, doubles and mixed doubles titles.)	WTA titles	Total titles	Earnings ($)	Money list rank
2015	0	0	0	82,133	198
2016	0	0	0	45,869	260
2017	0	0	0	348,221	105
2018	0	0	0	401,569	92
2019	0	0	0	570,473	74
2020	0	0	0	933,983	14
2021	0	1	1	1,621,879	15
2022	0	2	2	4,997,069	2
2023	0	2	2	3,194,564	7
2024	0	0	0	1,050,528	51
2025	0	0	0	746,542	50
Career	0	5	5	14,176,821	46

== Career Grand Slam statistics ==
=== Seedings ===
The tournaments won by Jabeur are in boldface, and advanced into finals by Jabeur are in italics.

Legend seeded No. 2 (0 / 1) seeded No. 3 (0 / 1) seeded No. 4–10 (0 / 8) seeded No. 11–32 (0 / 6) unseeded (0 / 8) wild card (0 / 1) qualifier (0 / 4)	Longest streak 1 1 6 6 5 1 2

Year	Australian Open	French Open	Wimbledon	US Open
2012	did not play	did not qualify	did not play	
2013	did not play		did not qualify	did not qualify
2014	did not play	did not qualify	did not qualify	qualifier
2015	qualifier	did not qualify	did not play	did not qualify
2016	did not play		did not qualify	did not qualify
2017	did not qualify	qualifier	qualifier	unseeded
2018	unseeded	did not qualify	wild card	qualifier
2019	unseeded	unseeded	unseeded	unseeded
2020	unseeded	30th	cancelled	27th
2021	27th	25th	21st	20th
2022	did not play	6th	3rd (1)	5th (2)
2023	2nd	7th	6th (3)	5th
2024	6th	8th	10th	did not play
2025	unseeded	unseeded	unseeded	

=== Best Grand Slam results details ===
Grand Slam winners are in boldface, and runner-ups are in italics.

Australian Open
2020 (unseeded)
Round	Opponent	Rank	Score
1R	(United Kingdom) Johanna Konta (12)	13	6–4, 6–2
2R	(France) Caroline Garcia	46	1–6, 6–2, 6–3
3R	(Denmark) Caroline Wozniacki	36	7–5, 3–6, 7–5
4R	(China) Wang Qiang (27)	29	7–6^{(7–4)}, 6–1
QF	(United States) **Sofia Kenin** (14)	15	4–6, 4–6

Wimbledon Championships
2022 (3rd)
Round	Opponent	Rank	Score
1R	(Sweden) Mirjam Björklund (Q)	125	6–1, 6–3
2R	(Poland) Katarzyna Kawa (Q)	132	6–4, 6–0
3R	(France) Diane Parry	77	6–2, 6–3
4R	(Belgium) Elise Mertens (24)	31	7–6^{(11–9)}, 6–4
QF	(Czech Republic) Marie Bouzková	66	3–6, 6–1, 6–1
SF	(Germany) Tatjana Maria	103	6–2, 3–6, 6–1
F	**(Kazakhstan) Elena Rybakina (17)**	23	6–3, 2–6, 2–6
2023 (6th)
Round	Opponent	Rank	Score
1R	(Poland) Magdalena Fręch	70	6–3, 6–3
2R	(China) Bai Zhuoxuan (Q)	191	6–1, 6–1
3R	(Canada) Bianca Andreescu	50	3–6, 6–3, 6–4
4R	(Czech Republic) Petra Kvitová (9)	9	6–0, 6–3
QF	(Kazakhstan) Elena Rybakina (3)	3	6–7^{(5–7)}, 6–4, 6–1
SF	Aryna Sabalenka (2)	2	6–7^{(5–7)}, 6–4, 6–3
F	(Czech Republic) **Markéta Vondroušová**	42	4–6, 4–6

French Open
2023 (7th)
Round	Opponent	Rank	Score
1R	(Italy) Lucia Bronzetti	65	6–4, 6–1
2R	(France) Océane Dodin	122	6–2, 6–3
3R	(Serbia) Olga Danilović (Q)	105	4–6, 6–4, 6–2
4R	(United States) Bernarda Pera	36	6–3, 6–1
QF	(Brazil) Beatriz Haddad Maia (14)	14	6–3, 6–7^{(5–7)}, 1–6
2024 (8th)
Round	Opponent	Rank	Score
1R	(United States) Sachia Vickery (WC)	124	6–3, 6–2
2R	(Colombia) Camila Osorio	77	6–3, 1–6, 6–3
3R	(Canada) Leylah Fernandez (31)	34	6–4, 7–6^{(7–5)}
4R	(Denmark) Clara Tauson	72	6–4, 6–4
QF	(United States) Coco Gauff (3)	3	6–4, 2–6, 3–6

US Open
2022 (5th)
Round	Opponent	Rank	Score
1R	(United States) Madison Brengle	61	7–5, 6–2
2R	(United States) Elizabeth Mandlik (WC)	144	7–5, 6–2
3R	(United States) Shelby Rogers (31)	31	4–6, 6–4, 6–3
4R	Veronika Kudermetova (18)	18	7–6^{(7–1)}, 6–4
QF	(Australia) Ajla Tomljanović	46	6–4, 7–6^{(7–4)}
SF	(France) Caroline Garcia (17)	17	6–1, 6–3
F	(Poland) **Iga Świątek** (1)	1	2–6, 6–7^{(5–7)}

== Wins against top 10 players ==
- Jabeur has a 19–30 record against players who were, at the time the match was played, ranked in the top 10.

Season	2017	2018	2019	2020	2021	2022	2023	2024	2025	Total
Wins	1	2	0	1	5	2	5	1	2	19

#	Player	Rank	Tournament	Surface	Rd	Score	Rank
2017
1.	(Slovakia) Dominika Cibulková	7	French Open, France	Clay	2R	6–4, 6–3	114
2018
2.	(Romania) Simona Halep	1	China Open, China	Hard	1R	6–1, ret.	116
3.	(United States) Sloane Stephens	8	Kremlin Cup, Russia	Hard (i)	2R	6–3, 6–2	101
2020
4.	(Czech Republic) Karolína Plíšková	3	Qatar Ladies Open, Qatar	Hard	3R	6–4, 3–6, 6–3	44
2021
5.	(United States) Sofia Kenin	4	Miami Open, United States	Hard	3R	6–4, 4–6, 6–4	30
6.	(Poland) Iga Świątek	9	Wimbledon, United Kingdom	Grass	4R	5–7, 6–1, 6–1	24
7.	(Canada) Bianca Andreescu	8	Canadian Open, Canada	Hard	3R	6–7^{(5–7)}, 6–4, 6–1	22
8.	(Poland) Iga Świątek	7	Cincinnati Open, United States	Hard	2R	6–3, 6–3	20
9.	(Ukraine) Elina Svitolina	6	Chicago Fall Open, US	Hard	QF	6–4, 6–2	16
2022
10.	(Greece) Maria Sakkari	4	Italian Open, Italy	Clay	QF	1–6, 7–5, 6–1	7
11.	(United States) Jessica Pegula	3	WTA Finals, United States	Hard (i)	RR	1–6, 6–3, 6–3	2
2023
12.	Daria Kasatkina	8	Charleston Open, US	Clay (green)	SF	7–5, 7–5	5
13.	(Czech Republic) Petra Kvitová	9	Wimbledon, UK	Grass	4R	6–0, 6–3	6
14.	(Kazakhstan) Elena Rybakina	3	Wimbledon, UK	Grass	QF	6–7^{(5–7)}, 6–4, 6–1	6
15.	Aryna Sabalenka	2	Wimbledon, UK	Grass	SF	6–7^{(5–7)}, 6–4, 6–3	6
16.	(Czech Republic) Markéta Vondroušová	6	WTA Finals, Mexico	Hard	RR	6–4, 6–3	7
2024
17.	(Latvia) Jeļena Ostapenko	10	Madrid Open, Spain	Clay	4R	6–0, 6–4	9
2025
18.	(China) Zheng Qinwen	8	Qatar Ladies Open, Qatar	Hard	2R	6–4, 6–2	35
19.	(Italy) Jasmine Paolini	5	Berlin Open, Germany	Grass	2R	6–1, 6–3	61

== Longest winning streaks ==
=== 11–match singles winning streak ===
==== #1 (2022) ====
#	Tournament	Tier	Start date	Surface	Round	Opponent	vsRank	Score	Rk
–	Stuttgart Open, Germany	WTA 500	18 April 2022	Clay	QF	(Spain) Paula Badosa (2)	3	6–7^{(9–11)}, 6–1, 3–6	10
1	Madrid Open, Spain	WTA 1000	25 April 2022	Clay	1R	(Italy) Jasmine Paolini	46	7–6^{(11–9)}, 6–1	10
2	Madrid Open, Spain	WTA 1000	25 April 2022	Clay	2R	Varvara Gracheva (Q)	73	7–5, 0–6, 6–4	10
3	Madrid Open, Spain	WTA 1000	25 April 2022	Clay	3R	(Switzerland) Belinda Bencic (11)	13	6–2, 3–6, 6–2	10
4	Madrid Open, Spain	WTA 1000	25 April 2022	Clay	QF	(Romania) Simona Halep	21	6–3, 6–2	10
5	Madrid Open, Spain	WTA 1000	25 April 2022	Clay	SF	(Russia) Ekaterina Alexandrova (Q)	45	6–2, 6–3	10
6	Madrid Open, Spain	WTA 1000	25 April 2022	Clay	F	(United States) Jessica Pegula (12)	14	7–5, 0–6, 6–2	10
7	Italian Open, Italy	WTA 1000	9 May 2022	Clay	1R	(Romania) Sorana Cîrstea	26	6–0, 7–6^{(7–1)}	7
8	Italian Open, Italy	WTA 1000	9 May 2022	Clay	2R	(Australia) Ajla Tomljanović	41	7–5, 6–2	7
9	Italian Open, Italy	WTA 1000	9 May 2022	Clay	3R	(Kazakhstan) Yulia Putintseva (Q)	40	6–3, 6–2	7
10	Italian Open, Italy	WTA 1000	9 May 2022	Clay	QF	(Greece) Maria Sakkari (4)	4	1–6, 7–5, 6–1	7
11	Italian Open, Italy	WTA 1000	9 May 2022	Clay	SF	Daria Kasatkina	23	6–4, 1–6, 7–5	7
–	Italian Open, Italy	WTA 1000	9 May 2022	Clay	F	(Poland) Iga Świątek (1)	1	2–6, 2–6	7

==== #2 (2022) ====
#	Tournament	Tier	Start date	Surface	Round	Opponent	vsRank	Score	Rk
–	French Open, France	Grand Slam	23 May 2022	Clay	1R	(Poland) Magda Linette	52	6–3, 6–7^{(4–7)}, 5–7	6
1	German Open, Germany	WTA 500	13 June 2022	Grass	1R	(Czech Republic) Karolína Muchová (PR)	80	6–3, 6–2	4
2	German Open, Germany	WTA 500	13 June 2022	Grass	2R	(United States) Alycia Parks (Q)	169	6–2, 7–6^{(10–8)}	4
3	German Open, Germany	WTA 500	13 June 2022	Grass	QF	Aliaksandra Sasnovich	38	6–7^{(3–7)}, 6–2, 6–2	4
4	German Open, Germany	WTA 500	13 June 2022	Grass	SF	(United States) Coco Gauff (7)	13	7–6^{(7–4)}, 6–2	4
5	German Open, Germany	WTA 500	13 June 2022	Grass	F	(Switzerland) Belinda Bencic (8)	17	6–3, 2–1 ret.	4
6	Wimbledon, United Kingdom	Grand Slam	27 June 2022	Grass	1R	(Sweden) Mirjam Björklund (Q)	125	6–1, 6–3	2
7	Wimbledon, United Kingdom	Grand Slam	27 June 2022	Grass	2R	(Poland) Katarzyna Kawa (Q)	132	6–4, 6–0	2
8	Wimbledon, United Kingdom	Grand Slam	27 June 2022	Grass	3R	(France) Diane Parry	77	6–2, 6–3	2
9	Wimbledon, United Kingdom	Grand Slam	27 June 2022	Grass	4R	(Belgium) Elise Mertens (24)	31	7–6^{(11–9)}, 6–4	2
10	Wimbledon, United Kingdom	Grand Slam	27 June 2022	Grass	QF	(Czech Republic) Marie Bouzková	66	3–6, 6–1, 6–1	2
11	Wimbledon, United Kingdom	Grand Slam	27 June 2022	Grass	SF	(Germany) Tatjana Maria	103	6–2, 3–6, 6–1	2
–	Wimbledon, United Kingdom	Grand Slam	27 June 2022	Grass	F	(Kazakhstan) Elena Rybakina (17)	23	6–3, 2–6, 2–6	2

== Exhibition matches ==
=== Singles ===
Result	Date	Tournament	Surface	Opponent	Score
Win	Nov 2023	Anett's Farewell, Tallinn, Estonia	Hard (i)	(Estonia) Anett Kontaveit	6–4, 4–6, [10–7]
