= Tanja Tuomi =

Finnish tennis player

- Full name: Tanja Tuomi
- Country (sports): Finland
- Born: 4 May 1996 (age 28); Tampere, Finland
- Height: 1.71 m (5 ft 7 in)
- Prize money: $1,202

Singles
- Career record: 1–7
- Career titles: 0
- Highest ranking: —

Doubles
- Career record: 1–5
- Career titles: 0
- Highest ranking: —

Team competitions
- Fed Cup: 2–2

Tanja Tuomi (born 4 May 1996 in Tampere) is a Finnish tennis player.

Tuomi has a 2–2 record for Finland in Fed Cup competition.

== Fed Cup participation ==
=== Singles ===
Edition	Stage	Date	Location	Against	Surface	Opponent	W/L	Score
2013 Fed Cup; Europe/Africa Zone Group II	R/R	19 April 2013	Ulcinj, Montenegro	Estonia	Clay	(Estonia) Julia Matojan	W	3–6, 7–5, 7–6^{(8–6)}
2013 Fed Cup; Europe/Africa Zone Group II	P/O	20 April 2013	Ulcinj, Montenegro	Greece	Clay	(Greece) Despina Papamichail	L	0–6, 3–6

=== Doubles ===
Edition	Stage	Date	Location	Against	Surface	Partner	Opponents	W/L	Score
2013 Fed Cup; Europe/Africa Zone Group II	R/R	17 April 2013	Ulcinj, Montenegro	Latvia	Clay	(Finland) Ella Leivo	(Latvia) Diāna Marcinkēviča (Latvia) Jeļena Ostapenko	L	0–6, 3–6
2013 Fed Cup; Europe/Africa Zone Group II	R/R	18 April 2013	Ulcinj, Montenegro	Tunisia	Clay	(Finland) Milka-Emilia Pasanen	(Tunisia) Yosr Elmi (Tunisia) Mouna Jebri	W	6–2, 7–5
