= Tatjana Vorobjova =

Estonian tennis player

- Full name: Tatjana Vorobjova
- Country (sports): Estonia
- Born: 26 July 1996 (age 28); Tallinn, Estonia
- Prize money: $516

Singles
- Career record: 1–2
- Career titles: 0
- Highest ranking: —

Doubles
- Career record: 0–5
- Career titles: 0
- Highest ranking: —

Team competitions
- Fed Cup: 4–7

Tatjana Vorobjova (Russian: Татьяна Воробьёва; born 26 July 1996 in Tallinn) is a retired Estonian tennis player.

Playing for Estonia at the Fed Cup, Vorobjova has a win–loss record of 4–7.

== Fed Cup participation ==
=== Singles ===
Edition	Stage	Date	Location	Against	Surface	Opponent	W/L	Score
2012 Fed Cup; Europe/Africa Zone Group I	R/R	2 February 2012	Eilat, Israel	Austria	Hard	(Austria) Patricia Mayr-Achleitner	L	0–6, 0–6
2013 Fed Cup; Europe/Africa Zone Group II	R/R	19 April 2013	Ulcinj, Montenegro	Finland	Clay	(Finland) Piia Suomalainen	L	6–3, 3–6, 4–6

=== Doubles ===
Edition	Stage	Date	Location	Against	Surface	Partner	Opponents	W/L	Score
2012 Fed Cup; Europe/Africa Zone Group I	R/R	1 February 2012	Eilat, Israel	Bulgaria	Hard	(Estonia) Eva Paalma	(Bulgaria) Dia Evtimova (Bulgaria) Tsvetana Pironkova	L	0–6, 1–6
2012 Fed Cup; Europe/Africa Zone Group I	R/R	2 February 2012	Eilat, Israel	Austria	Hard	(Estonia) Anett Kontaveit	(Austria) Sandra Klemenschits (Austria) Tamira Paszek	L	4–6, 4–6
2012 Fed Cup; Europe/Africa Zone Group I	P/O	4 February 2012	Eilat, Israel	Netherlands	Hard	(Estonia) Anett Kontaveit	(Netherlands) Kiki Bertens (Netherlands) Michaëlla Krajicek	L	0–6, 0–6
2013 Fed Cup; Europe/Africa Zone Group II	R/R	17 April 2013	Ulcinj, Montenegro	Tunisia	Clay	(Estonia) Eva Paalma	(Tunisia) Yosr Elmi (Tunisia) Mouna Jebri	W	6–0, 6–1
2013 Fed Cup; Europe/Africa Zone Group II	R/R	18 April 2013	Ulcinj, Montenegro	Latvia	Clay	(Estonia) Eva Paalma	(Latvia) Laura Gulbe (Latvia) Diāna Marcinkēviča	L	3–6, 5–7
2013 Fed Cup; Europe/Africa Zone Group II	R/R	19 April 2013	Ulcinj, Montenegro	Finland	Clay	(Estonia) Eva Paalma	(Finland) Ella Leivo (Finland) Milka-Emilia Pasanen	W	7–6^{(7–3)}, 6–1
2013 Fed Cup; Europe/Africa Zone Group II	P/O	20 April 2013	Ulcinj, Montenegro	South Africa	Clay	(Estonia) Eva Paalma	(South Africa) Natalie Grandin (South Africa) Madrie Le Roux	L	1–6, 3–6
2014 Fed Cup; Europe/Africa Zone Group III	R/R	5 February 2014	Tallinn, Estonia	Namibia	Hard (i)	(Estonia) Eva Paalma	(Namibia) Lesedi Sheya Jacobs (Namibia) Liniques Theron	W	7–5, 6–2
2014 Fed Cup; Europe/Africa Zone Group III	R/R	7 February 2014	Tallinn, Estonia	Armenia	Hard (i)	(Estonia) Eva Paalma	(Armenia) Lusine Chobanyan (Armenia) Ani Safaryan	W	6–3, 6–2
