= Laura Gulbe =

Latvian tennis player

- Country (sports): Latvia
- Born: 27 February 1995 (age 31) Riga, Latvia
- Prize money: $7,875

Singles
- Career record: 53–42
- Career titles: 0
- Highest ranking: 898 (13 April 2015)
- Current ranking: 1130 (8 August 2016)

Doubles
- Career record: 5–15
- Career titles: 0
- Highest ranking: 1131 (7 October 2013)
- Current ranking: —

Team competitions
- Fed Cup: 3–0
- Last updated on: 8 August 2016.

Laura Gulbe (born 27 February 1995) is a Latvian tennis player.

Gulbe was born in Riga. On 13 April 2015, she reached her best singles ranking of world number 898. On 7 October 2013, she peaked at world number 1131 in the doubles rankings.

Playing for Latvia at the Fed Cup, Gulbe has a win–loss record of 3–0. (Note: Laura Gulbe at the Billie Jean King Cup (archived))

Gulbe is the half-sister of professional tennis player Ernests Gulbis. Her father, Ainārs, is an investment businessman, and her mother's name is Vineta. Her paternal grandfather, Alvils Gulbis, was one of the starting five players for Rīgas ASK, the Soviet basketball team that won the European Championships.

Laura graduated from Pepperdine University with a degree in International Business in Spring 2018.

== Fed Cup participation ==
=== Doubles ===
Edition	Stage	Date	Location	Against	Surface	Partner	Opponents	W/L	Score
2012 Fed Cup; Europe/Africa Zone Group II	R/R	19 April 2012	Cairo, Egypt	(Georgia (country)) Georgia	Clay	(Latvia) Diāna Marcinkēviča	(Georgia (country)) Sofia Kvatsabaia (Georgia (country)) Sofia Shapatava	W	7–6^{(7–5)}, 6–3
2012 Fed Cup; Europe/Africa Zone Group II	R/R	20 April 2012	Cairo, Egypt	Norway	Clay	(Latvia) Diāna Marcinkēviča	(Norway) Emma Flood (Norway) Hedda Ødegaard	W	6–3, 6–4
2013 Fed Cup; Europe/Africa Zone Group II	R/R	18 April 2013	Ulcinj, Montenegro	Estonia	Clay	(Latvia) Diāna Marcinkēviča	(Estonia) Eva Paalma (Estonia) Tatjana Vorobjova	W	6–3, 7–5
