= 2017 Korea Open =

- Date: 18–24 September
- Edition: 14th
- Category: WTA International
- Draw: 32S / 16D
- Prize money: $250,000
- Surface: Hard / outdoor
- Location: Seoul, South Korea
- Venue: Seoul Olympic Park Tennis Center

Champions

Singles
- (Latvia) Jeļena Ostapenko

Doubles
- (Netherlands) Kiki Bertens / (Sweden) Johanna Larsson
← 2016 ·	Korea Open	· 2018 →

The 2017 Korea Open (also known as the 2017 KEB Hana Bank-Incheon Airport Korea Open for sponsorship purposes) was a women's professional tennis tournament played on hard courts. It was the 14th edition of the tournament], and part of the 2017 WTA Tour. It took place in Seoul, South Korea between 18 and 24 September 2017.

== Finals ==
=== Singles ===
(Latvia) Jeļena Ostapenko defeated (Brazil) Beatriz Haddad Maia, 6–7^{(5–7)}, 6–1, 6–4

- It was Ostapenko's 2nd and last singles title of the year and the 2nd of her career.

=== Doubles ===
(Netherlands) Kiki Bertens / (Sweden) Johanna Larsson defeated (Thailand) Luksika Kumkhum / (Thailand) Peangtarn Plipuech, 6–4, 6–1

== Points and prize money ==
=== Point distribution ===
Event	W	F	SF	QF	Round of 16	Round of 32	Q	Q3	Q2	Q1
Singles	280	180	110	60	30	1	18	14	10	1
Doubles	280	180	110	60	1	—	—	—	—	—

=== Prize money ===
Event	W	F	SF	QF	Round of 16	Round of 32	Q	Q2	Q1
Singles	$43,000	$21,400	$11,300	$5,900	$3,310	$1,925	$1,005	$730	$530
Doubles	$12,300	$6,400	$3,435	$1,820	$960	—	—	—	—
Doubles prize money per team

== Singles main-draw entrants ==
=== Seeds ===
Country	Player	Rank^{1}	Seed
LAT	Jeļena Ostapenko	10	1
NED	Kiki Bertens	29	2
CZE	Kristýna Plíšková	44	3
ROU	Sorana Cîrstea	51	4
ROU	Irina-Camelia Begu	54	5
GER	Tatjana Maria	58	6
ESP	Lara Arruabarrena	61	7
USA	Christina McHale	62	8

- ^{1} Rankings are as of September 11, 2017

=== Other entrants ===
The following players received wildcards into the singles main draw:

- (South Korea) Han Na-lae
- (South Korea) Jang Su-jeong
- (Ukraine) Katarina Zavatska

The following player received entry using a protected ranking into the singles main draw:

- (Japan) Misa Eguchi

The following players received entry from the qualifying draw:

- (Australia) Priscilla Hon
- (Thailand) Luksika Kumkhum
- (Czech Republic) Karolína Muchová
- (Thailand) Peangtarn Plipuech
- (Netherlands) Arantxa Rus
- (Thailand) Varatchaya Wongteanchai

=== Withdrawals ===
Before the tournament

- (Canada) Eugenie Bouchard →replaced by (Colombia) Mariana Duque Mariño
- (Japan) Misaki Doi →replaced by (Japan) Misa Eguchi
- (Belgium) Kirsten Flipkens →replaced by (Chinese Taipei) Chang Kai-chen
- (United States) Varvara Lepchenko →replaced by (Netherlands) Richèl Hogenkamp
- (United States) Sloane Stephens →replaced by (Russia) Ekaterina Alexandrova
- (Russia) Elena Vesnina →replaced by (Czech Republic) Denisa Allertová

== Doubles main-draw entrants ==
=== Seeds ===
Country	Player	Country	Player	Rank^{1}	Seed
NED	Kiki Bertens	SWE	Johanna Larsson	52	1
ROU	Irina-Camelia Begu	CZE	Kristýna Plíšková	120	2
JPN	Nao Hibino	GEO	Oksana Kalashnikova	125	3
TPE	Chuang Chia-jung	NED	Arantxa Rus	223	4

- ^{1} Rankings are as of September 11, 2017

=== Other entrants ===
The following pair received a wildcard into the doubles main draw:

- (South Korea) Jeong Su-nam / (South Korea) Park Sang-hee

=== Withdrawals ===
During the tournament

- (Romania) Sorana Cîrstea
