= 2017 Korea Open – Doubles =

Doubles
- 2017 Korea Open

Final
- Champions: (Netherlands) Kiki Bertens (Sweden) Johanna Larsson
- Runners-up: (Thailand) Luksika Kumkhum (Thailand) Peangtarn Plipuech
- Score: 6–4, 6–1

Events
Singles	Doubles
- Korea Open

Kirsten Flipkens and Johanna Larsson were the defending champions, but Flipkens chose not to participate this year.

Larsson played alongside Kiki Bertens and successfully retained the title, defeating Luksika Kumkhum and Peangtarn Plipuech in the final, 6–4, 6–1.

== Seeds ==
1. (Netherlands) Kiki Bertens / (Sweden) Johanna Larsson (champions)
2. (Romania) Irina-Camelia Begu / (Czech Republic) Kristýna Plíšková (quarterfinals)
3. (Japan) Nao Hibino / (Georgia (country)) Oksana Kalashnikova (semifinals)
4. (Chinese Taipei) Chuang Chia-jung / (Netherlands) Arantxa Rus (first round)

== Draw ==
Key

- Q = Qualifier
- WC = Wild card
- LL = Lucky loser
- Alt = Alternate
- ITF = ITF entry
- PR = Protected ranking
- SR = Special ranking
- SE = Special exempt
- JE = Junior exempt
- JR = Junior Accelerator Programme entrant
- CO = College Accelerator Programme entrant
- NG = Next Gen Accelerator Program entrant
- w/o = Walkover
- r = Retired
- d = Defaulted

First round
1	(Netherlands) K Bertens (Sweden) J Larsson	6	6
(Germany) N Geuer (Netherlands) E Wacanno	4	1
(South Korea) N-l Han (South Korea) S-j Jang	6	6
WC	(South Korea) S-n Jeong (South Korea) S-h Park	3	4
4	(Chinese Taipei) C-j Chuang (Netherlands) A Rus	5	6^{0}
(Romania) S Cîrstea (Latvia) J Ostapenko	7	7^{7}
(United Kingdom) K Dunne (Australia) P Hon	6^{2}	6	[10]
(Japan) M Eguchi (Czech Republic) T Martincová	7^{7}	2	[3]
(Australia) O Tjandramulia (Thailand) V Wongteanchai	6	6
(Netherlands) R Hogenkamp (Czech Republic) K Muchová	4	2
(Russia) A Morgina (Japan) K Takahata	3	5
3	(Japan) N Hibino (Georgia (country)) O Kalashnikova	6	7
(Netherlands) C Ewijk (Netherlands) R van der Hoek	6^{4}	4
(Thailand) L Kumkhum (Thailand) P Plipuech	7^{7}	6
(South Korea) J-h Choi (South Korea) N-r Kim	4	7^{8}	[6]
2	(Romania) I-C Begu (Czech Republic) Kr Plíšková	6	6^{6}	[10]

Quarterfinals
1	(Netherlands) K Bertens (Sweden) J Larsson	6	7
(South Korea) N-l Han (South Korea) S-j Jang	2	5
(Romania) S Cîrstea (Latvia) J Ostapenko
(United Kingdom) K Dunne (Australia) P Hon	w/o
(Australia) O Tjandramulia (Thailand) V Wongteanchai	4	4
3	(Japan) N Hibino (Georgia (country)) O Kalashnikova	6	6
(Thailand) L Kumkhum (Thailand) P Plipuech	6	6
2	(Romania) I-C Begu (Czech Republic) Kr Plíšková	4	2

Semifinals
1	(Netherlands) K Bertens (Sweden) J Larsson	6	6
(United Kingdom) K Dunne (Australia) P Hon	3	0
3	(Japan) N Hibino (Georgia (country)) O Kalashnikova	5	2
(Thailand) L Kumkhum (Thailand) P Plipuech	7	6

Final
1	(Netherlands) K Bertens (Sweden) J Larsson	6	6
(Thailand) L Kumkhum (Thailand) P Plipuech	4	1
