= 2013 Fed Cup Europe/Africa Zone Group II – play-offs =

The play-offs of the 2013 Fed Cup Europe/Africa Zone Group II were the final stages of the Group II zonal competition involving teams from Europe and Africa. Using the positions determined in their pools, the seven teams faced off to determine their placing in the 2013 Fed Cup Europe/Africa Zone Group II. The top two teams advanced to Group I, and the bottom two teams were relegated down to the Group III for the next year.

Placing	Pool A	Pool B
1	Tunisia	Montenegro
2	Latvia	Lithuania
3	Finland	South Africa
4	Estonia	Greece

== Promotional play-offs ==
The first-placed teams of each pool played against the second-placed teams of the other pool in head-to-head rounds. The winner of each round advanced to the 2014 Europe/Africa Zone Group I.

=== Tunisia vs. Lithuania ===
Tunisia
2
Bellevue Club, Ulcinj, Montenegro
20 April 2013
Red clay (outdoors)

Lithuania
1

			1	2	3
1	(Tunisia) (Lithuania)	Nour Abbès; Justina Mikulskytė	6; 3	6; 4
2	(Tunisia) (Lithuania)	Ons Jabeur; Lina Stančiūtė	6; 3	6; 0
3	(Tunisia) (Lithuania)	Yosr Elmi / Mouna Jebri; Agnė Čepelytė / Joana Eidukonytė	6; 3	1; 6	1; 6

=== Latvia vs. Montenegro ===
Latvia
2
Bellevue Club, Ulcinj, Montenegro
20 April 2013
Red clay (outdoors)

Montenegro
1

			1	2	3
1	(Latvia) (Montenegro)	Jeļena Ostapenko; Ana Veselinović	7; 5	6; 2
2	(Latvia) (Montenegro)	Diāna Marcinkēviča; Danka Kovinić	2; 6	1; 6
3	(Latvia) (Montenegro)	Diāna Marcinkēviča / Jeļena Ostapenko; Danka Kovinić / Danica Krstajić	2; 6	6; 4	6; 4

== Relegation play-offs ==
The third-placed teams of each pool played against the fourth-placed teams of the other pool in head-to-head rounds. The loser of each round was relegated to the 2014 Europe/Africa Zone Group III.

=== Finland vs. Greece ===
Finland
2
Bellevue Club, Ulcinj, Montenegro
20 April 2013
Red clay (outdoors)

Greece
1

			1	2	3
1	(Finland) (Greece)	Tanja Tuomi; Despina Papamichail	0; 6	3; 6
2	(Finland) (Greece)	Piia Suomalainen; Maria Sakkari	6; 0	6; 2
3	(Finland) (Greece)	Ella Leivo / Piia Suomalainen; Despina Papamichail / Despoina Vogasari	6; 4	2; 6	7; 5

=== Estonia vs. South Africa ===
Estonia
1
Bellevue Club, Ulcinj, Montenegro
20 April 2013
Red clay (outdoors)

South Africa
2

			1	2	3
1	(Estonia) (South Africa)	Eva Paalma; Madrie Le Roux	6; 2	6; 1
2	(Estonia) (South Africa)	Erika Hendsel; Chanel Simmonds	3; 6	2; 6
3	(Estonia) (South Africa)	Eva Paalma / Tatjana Vorobjova; Natalie Grandin / Madrie Le Roux	1; 6	3; 6

== Final placements ==
Placing	Teams	
Promoted	Tunisia	Latvia
Third	Lithuania	Montenegro
Fifth	Finland	South Africa
Relegated	Greece	Estonia

- Tunisia and Latvia were promoted to Europe/Africa Zone Group I for 2014.
- Greece and Estonia were relegated to Europe/Africa Zone Group III for 2014.
