= 2013 Fed Cup Europe/Africa Zone Group II – Pool A =

International tennis competition

Group A of the 2013 Fed Cup Europe/Africa Zone Group II was one of two pools in the Europe/Africa zone of the 2013 Fed Cup. Four teams competed in a round-robin competition, with the top team and the bottom team proceeding to their respective sections of the play-offs: the top team played for advancement to Group I, while the bottom team faced potential relegation to Group III.

== Standings ==
		(Estonia) EST	(Finland) FIN	(Latvia) LAT	(Tunisia) TUN	RR; W–L	Match; W–L	Set; W–L	Game; W–L	Standings
47	Estonia		0–2	0–3	1–2	0–3	1–7	5–14	74–98	4
55	Finland	2–0		0–3	1–2	1–2	3–5	6–12	63–97	3
64	Latvia	3–0	3–0		1–2	2–1	7–2	14–5	103–59	2
66	Tunisia	2–1	2–1	2–1		3–0	6–3	12–6	92–68	1

== Round-robin ==
=== Estonia vs. Tunisia ===
Estonia
1
Bellevue Club, Ulcinj, Montenegro
17 April 2013
Red clay (outdoors)

Tunisia
2

			1	2	3
1	(Estonia) (Tunisia)	Julia Matojan; Nour Abbès	3; 6	3; 6
2	(Estonia) (Tunisia)	Eva Paalma; Ons Jabeur	2; 6	2; 6
3	(Estonia) (Tunisia)	Eva Paalma / Tatjana Vorobjova; Yosr Elmi / Mouna Jebri	6; 0	6; 1

=== Finland vs. Latvia ===
Finland
0
Bellevue Club, Ulcinj, Montenegro
17 April 2013
Red clay (outdoors)

Latvia
3

			1	2	3
1	(Finland) (Latvia)	Ella Leivo; Jeļena Ostapenko	0; 6	1; 6
2	(Finland) (Latvia)	Piia Suomalainen; Diāna Marcinkēviča	4; 6	3; 6
3	(Finland) (Latvia)	Ella Leivo / Tanja Tuomi; Diāna Marcinkēviča / Jeļena Ostapenko	0; 6	3; 6

=== Estonia vs. Latvia ===
Estonia
0
Bellevue Club, Ulcinj, Montenegro
18 April 2013
Red clay (outdoors)

Latvia
3

			1	2	3
1	(Estonia) (Latvia)	Julia Matojan; Jeļena Ostapenko	1; 6	1; 6
2	(Estonia) (Latvia)	Erika Hendsel; Diāna Marcinkēviča	5; 7	6; 3	1; 6
3	(Estonia) (Latvia)	Eva Paalma / Tatjana Vorobjova; Laura Gulbe / Diāna Marcinkēviča	3; 6	5; 7

=== Finland vs. Tunisia ===
Finland
1
Bellevue Club, Ulcinj, Montenegro
18 April 2013
Red clay (outdoors)

Tunisia
2

			1	2	3
1	(Finland) (Tunisia)	Ella Leivo; Nour Abbès	1; 6	2; 6
2	(Finland) (Tunisia)	Piia Suomalainen; Ons Jabeur	4; 6	0; 6
3	(Finland) (Tunisia)	Milka-Emilia Pasanen / Tanja Tuomi; Yosr Elmi / Mouna Jebri	6; 2	7; 5

=== Estonia vs. Finland ===
Estonia
1
Bellevue Club, Ulcinj, Montenegro
19 April 2013
Red clay (outdoors)

Finland
2

			1	2	3
1	(Estonia) (Finland)	Julia Matojan; Tanja Tuomi	6; 3	5; 7	6^{6} 7^{8}
2	(Estonia) (Finland)	Tatjana Vorobjova; Piia Suomalainen	6; 3	3; 6	4; 6
3	(Estonia) (Finland)	Eva Paalma / Tatjana Vorobjova; Ella Leivo / Milka-Emilia Pasanen	7^{7} 6^{3}	6; 1

=== Latvia vs. Tunisia ===
Latvia
1
Bellevue Club, Ulcinj, Montenegro
19 April 2013
Red clay (outdoors)

Tunisia
2

			1	2	3
1	(Latvia) (Tunisia)	Jeļena Ostapenko; Nour Abbès	6; 1	6; 1
2	(Latvia) (Tunisia)	Diāna Marcinkēviča; Ons Jabeur	4; 6	3; 6
3	(Latvia) (Tunisia)	Diāna Marcinkēviča / Jeļena Ostapenko; Nour Abbès / Ons Jabeur	3; 6	4; 6
