= 2012 Fed Cup Europe/Africa Zone Group I – Pool A =

Group A of the 2012 Fed Cup Europe/Africa Zone Group I was one of four pools in the Europe/Africa zone of the 2012 Fed Cup. Three teams competed in a round robin competition, with the top team and the bottom team proceeding to their respective sections of the play-offs: the top team played for advancement to the World Group II Play-offs, while the bottom team faced potential relegation to Group II.

		(Estonia) EST	(Austria) AUT	(Bulgaria) BUL	RR; W–L	Set; W–L	Game; W–L	Standings
17	Estonia		1–2	0–3	0–2	2–10	30–70	3
33	Austria	2–1		2–1	2–0	9–4	68–43	1
40	Bulgaria	3–0	1–2		1–1	8–5	58–43	2

== Estonia vs. Bulgaria ==
Estonia
0
Municipal Tennis Club, Eilat, Israel
February 1, 2012
Hard (outdoors)

Bulgaria
3

			1	2	3
1	(Estonia) (Bulgaria)	Margit Rüütel; Elitsa Kostova	2; 6	1; 6
2	(Estonia) (Bulgaria)	Anett Kontaveit; Tsvetana Pironkova	3; 6	1; 6
3	(Estonia) (Bulgaria)	Eva Paalma / Tatjana Vorobjova; Tsvetana Pironkova / Dia Evtimova	0; 6	1; 6

== Estonia vs. Austria ==
Estonia
1
Municipal Tennis Club, Eilat, Israel
February 2, 2012
Hard (outdoors)

Austria
2

			1	2	3
1	(Estonia) (Austria)	Tatjana Vorobjova; Patricia Mayr-Achleitner	0; 6	0; 6
2	(Estonia) (Austria)	Anett Kontaveit; Tamira Paszek	6; 4	7^{7} 6^{3}
3	(Estonia) (Austria)	Anett Kontaveit / Tatjana Vorobjova; Sandra Klemenschits / Tamira Paszek	4; 6	4; 6

== Austria vs. Bulgaria ==
Austria
2
Municipal Tennis Club, Eilat, Israel
February 3, 2012
Hard (outdoors)

Bulgaria
1

			1	2	3
1	(Austria) (Bulgaria)	Patricia Mayr-Achleitner; Elitsa Kostova	6; 3	6; 3
2	(Austria) (Bulgaria)	Tamira Paszek; Tsvetana Pironkova	3; 6	6; 1	1; 6
3	(Austria) (Bulgaria)	Yvonne Meusburger / Patricia Mayr-Achleitner; Tsvetana Pironkova / Dia Evtimova	6; 1	6; 2
