= 2016 Fed Cup Europe/Africa Zone Group III – Pool A =

Pool A of the 2016 Fed Cup Europe/Africa Group III was one of four pools in the Europe/Africa Group III of the 2016 Fed Cup. Four teams competed in a round robin competition, with the top team and bottom teams proceeding to their respective sections of the play-offs: the top team played for advancement to Group II.

== Standings ==
		TUN	GRE	MLT	LUX	RR; W–L	Set; W–L	Game; W–L	Standings
62	Tunisia		1–2	3–0	1–2	1–2	12–10	105–87	3
76	Greece	2–1		3–0	1–2	2–1	15–6	108–69	2
88	Malta	0–3	0–3		0–3	0–3	1–18	38–115	4
95	Luxembourg	2–1	2–1	3–0		3–0	15–9	126–106	1

== Round-robin ==
=== Tunisia vs. Luxembourg ===
Tunisia
1
Bellevue, Ulcinj, Montenegro
11 April 2016
Outdoor clay

Luxembourg
2

			1	2	3
1	(Tunisia) (Luxembourg)	Chiraz Bechri; Eléonora Molinaro	6; 2	4; 6	6; 3
2	(Tunisia) (Luxembourg)	Ons Jabeur; Mandy Minella	3; 6	6; 4	4; 6
3	(Tunisia) (Luxembourg)	Chiraz Bechri / Ons Jabeur; Mandy Minella / Claudine Schaul	6; 4	6^{6} 7^{8}	2; 6

=== Greece vs. Malta ===
Greece
3
Bellevue, Ulcinj, Montenegro
11 April 2016
Outdoor clay

Malta
0

			1	2	3
1	(Greece) (Malta)	Despina Papamichail; Katrina Sammut	6; 0	6; 0
2	(Greece) (Malta)	Maria Sakkari; Elaine Genovese	6; 1	6; 1
3	(Greece) (Malta)	Eleni Christofi / Despina Papamichail; Brenda Galea / Elaine Genovese	6; 0	6; 2

=== Tunisia vs. Malta ===
Tunisia
3
Bellevue, Ulcinj, Montenegro
13 April 2016
Outdoor clay

Malta
0

			1	2	3
1	(Tunisia) (Malta)	Chiraz Bechri; Katrina Sammut	6; 2	6; 1
2	(Tunisia) (Malta)	Ons Jabeur; Elaine Genovese	6; 1	6; 1
3	(Tunisia) (Malta)	Chiraz Bechri / Ons Jabeur; Brenda Galea / Elaine Genovese	6; 0	6; 2

=== Greece vs. Luxembourg ===
Greece
1
Bellevue, Ulcinj, Montenegro
13 April 2016
Outdoor clay

Luxembourg
2

			1	2	3
1	(Greece) (Luxembourg)	Despina Papamichail; Eléonora Molinaro	7^{11} 6^{9}	6; 4
2	(Greece) (Luxembourg)	Maria Sakkari; Mandy Minella	2; 6	6; 2	3; 6
3	(Greece) (Luxembourg)	Despina Papamichail / Maria Sakkari; Mandy Minella / Claudine Schaul	2; 6	6; 3	4; 6

=== Tunisia vs. Greece ===
Tunisia
1
Bellevue, Ulcinj, Montenegro
14 April 2016
Outdoor clay

Greece
2

			1	2	3
1	(Tunisia) (Greece)	Chiraz Bechri; Despina Papamichail	7; 5	3; 6	6; 1
2	(Tunisia) (Greece)	Ons Jabeur; Maria Sakkari	3; 6	3; 6
3	(Tunisia) (Greece)	Mouna Bouzgarrou / Diana Chehoudi; Eleni Christofi / Despina Papamichail	1; 6	0; 6

=== Malta vs. Luxembourg ===
Malta
0
Bellevue, Ulcinj, Montenegro
14 April 2016
Outdoor clay

Luxembourg
3

			1	2	3
1	(Malta) (Luxembourg)	Katrina Sammut; Merima Mujasevic	7; 5	2; 6	3; 6
2	(Malta) (Luxembourg)	Elaine Genovese; Eléonora Molinaro	6^{5} 7^{7}	6^{5} 7^{7}
3	(Malta) (Luxembourg)	Elaine Genovese / Katrina Sammut; Mandy Minella / Claudine Schaul	1; 6	2; 6

== See also ==
- Fed Cup structure
