= 2012 Fed Cup Europe/Africa Zone Group I – play-offs =

International tennis competition play-offs

The play-offs of the 2012 Fed Cup Europe/Africa Zone Group I were the final stages of the Group I Zonal Competition involving teams from Europe and Africa. Using the positions determined in their pools, the fifteen teams faced off to determine their placing in the 2012 Fed Cup Europe/Africa Zone Group I. The top two teams advanced to World Group II play-offs, and the bottom two teams were relegated down to the Europe/Africa Zone Group II.

Placing	Pool A	Pool B	Pool C	Pool D
1	Austria	Sweden	Great Britain	Poland
2	Bulgaria	Hungary	Portugal	Romania
3		Bosnia and Herzegovina	Israel	Croatia
4	Estonia	Greece	Netherlands	Luxembourg

== Promotion play-offs ==
The first placed teams of each pool were drawn in head-to-head rounds. The winner of each round advanced to the World Group II play-offs.

=== Austria vs. Great Britain ===
Austria
0
Municipal Tennis Club, Eilat, Israel
February 4, 2012
Hard (outdoors)

Great Britain
2

			1	2	3
1	(Austria) (United Kingdom)	Patricia Mayr-Achleitner; Anne Keothavong	6^{5} 7^{7}	3; 6
2	(Austria) (United Kingdom)	Tamira Paszek; Elena Baltacha	1; 6	4; 6
3	(Austria) (United Kingdom)	Sandra Klemenschits / Tamira Paszek; Laura Robson / Heather Watson				not played

=== Sweden vs. Poland ===
Sweden
2
Municipal Tennis Club, Eilat, Israel
February 4, 2012
Hard (outdoors)

Poland
1

			1	2	3
1	(Sweden) (Poland)	Sofia Arvidsson; Urszula Radwańska	6; 1	6; 2
2	(Sweden) (Poland)	Johanna Larsson; Agnieszka Radwańska	1; 6	0; 6
3	(Sweden) (Poland)	Sofia Arvidsson / Johanna Larsson; Agnieszka Radwańska / Urszula Radwańska	6; 4	6; 3

== 5th to 8th play-offs ==
The second placed teams of each pool were drawn in head-to-head rounds to find the equal fifth and seventh placed teams.

=== Bulgaria vs. Portugal ===
Bulgaria
0
Municipal Tennis Club, Eilat, Israel
February 5, 2012
Hard (outdoors)

Portugal
2

			1	2	3
1	(Bulgaria) (Portugal)	Isabella Shinikova; Maria João Köhler	3; 6	5; 7
2	(Bulgaria) (Portugal)	Dia Evtimova; Michelle Larcher de Brito	1; 6	1; 6
3	(Bulgaria) (Portugal)	Dia Evtimova / Isabella Shinikova; Maria João Köhler / Michelle Larcher de Brito				not played

=== Hungary vs. Romania ===
Hungary
0
Municipal Tennis Club, Eilat, Israel
February 5, 2012
Hard (outdoors)

Romania
2

			1	2	3
1	(Hungary) (Romania)	Katalin Marosi; Mihaela Buzărnescu	2; 6	6^{6} 7^{8}
2	(Hungary) (Romania)	Réka-Luca Jani; Simona Halep	2; 6	3; 6
3	(Hungary) (Romania)	Vaszilisza Bulgakova / Katalin Marosi; Mihaela Buzărnescu / Simona Halep				not played

== 9th to 12th play-offs ==
The third placed teams of each pool except Pool A were drawn in head-to-head rounds to find the equal ninth and the eleventh placed teams.

=== Bosnia and Herzegovina vs. Croatia ===
Bosnia and Herzegovina
0
Municipal Tennis Club, Eilat, Israel
February 5, 2012
Hard (outdoors)

Croatia
2

			1	2	3
1	(Bosnia and Herzegovina) (Croatia)	Anita Husarić; Donna Vekić	2; 6	0; 6
2	(Bosnia and Herzegovina) (Croatia)	Jasmina Tinjić; Tereza Mrdeža	0; 1			retired
3	(Bosnia and Herzegovina) (Croatia)	Anita Husarić / Jasmina Tinjić; Petra Martić / Ani Mijačika				not played

== Relegation play-offs ==
The last placed teams of each pool were drawn in head-to-head rounds. The loser of each round was relegated down to Europe/Africa Zone Group II in 2013.

=== Estonia vs. Netherlands ===
Estonia
1
Municipal Tennis Club, Eilat, Israel
February 4, 2012
Hard (outdoors)

Netherlands
2

			1	2	3
1	(Estonia) (Netherlands)	Eva Paalma; Kiki Bertens	2; 6	2; 6
2	(Estonia) (Netherlands)	Anett Kontaveit; Bibiane Schoofs	4; 6	7^{7} 6^{3}	6; 1
3	(Estonia) (Netherlands)	Anett Kontaveit / Tatjana Vorobjova; Kiki Bertens / Michaëlla Krajicek	0; 6	0; 6

=== Greece vs. Luxembourg ===
Greece
1
Municipal Tennis Club, Eilat, Israel
February 5, 2012
Hard (outdoors)

Luxembourg
2

			1	2	3
1	(Greece) (Luxembourg)	Agni Stefanou; Claudine Schaul	4; 6	2; 6
2	(Greece) (Luxembourg)	Despina Papamichail; Anne Kremer	5; 7	6; 4	7; 5
3	(Greece) (Luxembourg)	Despina Papamichail / Maria Sakkari; Anne Kremer / Claudine Schaul	6; 3	2; 6	6^{8} 7^{10}

== Final Placements ==
Placing	Teams	
Promoted	Great Britain	Sweden
Third	Austria	Poland
Fifth	Portugal	Romania
Seventh	Bulgaria	Hungary
Ninth	Israel	Croatia
Eleventh	Bosnia and Herzegovina	
Twelfth	Netherlands	Luxembourg
Relegated	Estonia	Greece

- Great Britain and Sweden advanced to the World Group II play-offs, where they were drawn against each other for advancement. Sweden defeated Great Britain, 4–1, and thus proceeded to World Group II whilst the British were relegated back to Group I for 2013.
- Estonia and Greece were relegated down to 2013 Fed Cup Europe/Africa Zone Group II.

== See also ==
- Fed Cup structure
