= 2015 Fed Cup Europe/Africa Zone Group II – Pool A =

Group A of the 2015 Fed Cup Europe/Africa Zone Group II was one of two pools in the Europe/Africa zone of the 2015 Fed Cup. Four teams competed in a round-robin competition, with the top team and the bottom team proceeding to their respective sections of the play-offs: the top team played for advancement to Group I, while the bottom team faced potential relegation to Group III.

== Standings ==
		(South Africa) RSA	(Bosnia and Herzegovina) BIH	(Egypt) EGY	(Estonia) EST	RR; W–L	Match; W–L	Set; W–L	Game; W–L	Standings
51	South Africa		2–1	3–0	2–1	3–0	7–2	14–5	99–64	1
58	Bosnia and Herzegovina	1–2		1–2	0–3	0–3	2–7	6–15	85–114	4
72	Egypt	0–3	2–1		1–2	1–2	3–6	7–12	64–101	3
77	Estonia	1–2	3–0	2–1		2–1	6–3	14–8	119–88	2

== Round-robin ==
=== South Africa vs. Egypt ===
South Africa
3
Tere Tenniscentre, Tallinn, Estonia
4 February 2015
Plexipave (indoors)

Egypt
0

			1	2	3
1	(South Africa) (Egypt)	Chanel Simmonds; Sandra Samir	6; 0	6; 2
2	(South Africa) (Egypt)	Chanelle Scheepers; Ola Abou Zekry	6; 0	6; 1
3	(South Africa) (Egypt)	Ilze Hattingh / Michelle Sammons; Ola Abou Zekry / Sandra Samir	6; 4	6; 3

=== Estonia vs. Bosnia and Herzegovina ===
Estonia
3
Tere Tenniscentre, Tallinn, Estonia
4 February 2015
Plexipave (indoors)

Bosnia and Herzegovina
0

			1	2	3
1	(Estonia) (Bosnia and Herzegovina)	Anett Kontaveit; Anita Husarić	6^{6} 7^{8}	6; 4	6; 2
2	(Estonia) (Bosnia and Herzegovina)	Kaia Kanepi; Jasmina Tinjić	7; 5	6; 1
3	(Estonia) (Bosnia and Herzegovina)	Valeria Gorlats / Julia Skripnik; Jasmina Tinjić / Jelena Simić	4; 6	7^{9} 6^{7}	7; 5

=== Estonia vs. South Africa ===
Estonia
1
Tere Tenniscentre, Tallinn, Estonia
5 February 2015
Plexipave (indoors)

South Africa
2

			1	2	3
1	(Estonia) (South Africa)	Anett Kontaveit; Chanel Simmonds	6; 3	6; 3
2	(Estonia) (South Africa)	Kaia Kanepi; Chanelle Scheepers	4; 6	3; 6
3	(Estonia) (South Africa)	Kaia Kanepi / Anett Kontaveit; Michelle Sammons / Chanel Simmonds	6; 3	3; 6	4; 6

=== Bosnia and Herzegovina vs. Egypt ===
Bosnia and Herzegovina
1
Tere Tenniscentre, Tallinn, Estonia
5 February 2015
Plexipave (indoors)

Egypt
2

			1	2	3
1	(Bosnia and Herzegovina) (Egypt)	Anita Husarić; Sandra Samir	3; 6	3; 6
2	(Bosnia and Herzegovina) (Egypt)	Jasmina Tinjić; Ola Abou Zekry	6; 4	1; 6	6; 1
3	(Bosnia and Herzegovina) (Egypt)	Anita Husarić / Jelena Simić; Ola Abou Zekry / Sandra Samir	4; 6	4; 6

=== South Africa vs. Bosnia and Herzegovina ===
South Africa
2
Tere Tenniscentre, Tallinn, Estonia
6 February 2015
Plexipave (indoors)

Bosnia and Herzegovina
1

			1	2	3
1	(South Africa) (Bosnia and Herzegovina)	Chanel Simmonds; Damira Muminović	6; 4	6; 2
2	(South Africa) (Bosnia and Herzegovina)	Chanelle Scheepers; Jelena Simić	6; 4	6; 0
3	(South Africa) (Bosnia and Herzegovina)	Ilze Hattingh / Michelle Sammons; Jelena Simić / Jasmina Tinjić	4; 6	2; 6

=== Estonia vs. Egypt ===
Estonia
2
Tere Tenniscentre, Tallinn, Estonia
6 February 2015
Plexipave (indoors)

Egypt
1

			1	2	3
1	(Estonia) (Egypt)	Anett Kontaveit; Sandra Samir	6; 1	6; 1
2	(Estonia) (Egypt)	Kaia Kanepi; Ola Abou Zekry	6; 0	6; 1
3	(Estonia) (Egypt)	Valeria Gorlats / Julia Skripnik; Ola Abou Zekry / Dina Hegab	2; 6	6; 3	6^{3} 7^{7}
