= Julia Skripnik =

Estonian tennis player (born 1985)

- Full name: Julia Skripnik
- Country (sports): Estonia
- Born: 10 August 1985 (age 40) Tallinn, then part of Estonian SSR, Soviet Union
- Prize money: $5,461

Singles
- Career record: 17–36
- Career titles: 0
- Highest ranking: 866 (25 August 2008)

Doubles
- Career record: 8–24
- Career titles: 0
- Highest ranking: 949 (23 June 2008)

Team competitions
- Fed Cup: 1–4

Julia Skripnik (née Matojan; born 10 August 1985) is a retired Estonian tennis player.

On 25 August 2008, Skripnik reached her best singles ranking of world number 866. On 23 June 2008, she peaked at world number 949 in the doubles rankings.

Playing for Estonia at the Fed Cup, Skripnik has a win–loss record of 1–4. (Note: Julia Skripnik at the Billie Jean King Cup (archived))

== ITF finals (0–1) ==
=== Doubles (0–1) ===
Legend $100,000 tournaments $75,000 tournaments $50,000 tournaments $25,000 tournaments $15,000 tournaments $10,000 tournaments	Finals by surface Hard (0–0) Clay (0–1) Grass (0–0) Carpet (0–0)

Outcome	No.	Date	Tournament	Surface	Partner	Opponents	Score
Runner-up	1.	21 July 2014	Tallinn, Estonia	Clay	(Estonia) Eva Paalma	(Russia) Alexandra Artamonova (Sweden) Cornelia Lister	3–6, 2–6

== Fed Cup participation ==
=== Singles ===
Edition	Stage	Date	Location	Against	Surface	Opponent	W/L	Score
2013 Fed Cup; Europe/Africa Zone Group II	R/R	17 April 2013	Ulcinj, Montenegro	Tunisia	Clay	(Tunisia) Nour Abbès	L	3–6, 3–6
2013 Fed Cup; Europe/Africa Zone Group II	R/R	18 April 2013	Ulcinj, Montenegro	Latvia	Clay	(Latvia) Jeļena Ostapenko	L	1–6, 1–6
2013 Fed Cup; Europe/Africa Zone Group II	R/R	19 April 2013	Ulcinj, Montenegro	Finland	Clay	(Finland) Tanja Tuomi	L	6–3, 5–7, 6–7^{(6–8)}

=== Doubles ===
Edition	Stage	Date	Location	Against	Surface	Partner	Opponents	W/L	Score
2015 Fed Cup; Europe/Africa Zone Group II	R/R	4 February 2015	Tallinn, Estonia	Bosnia and Herzegovina	Hard (i)	(Estonia) Valeria Gorlats	(Bosnia and Herzegovina) Jelena Simić (Bosnia and Herzegovina) Jasmina Tinjić	W	4–6, 7–6^{(9–7)}, 7–5
2015 Fed Cup; Europe/Africa Zone Group II	R/R	6 February 2015	Tallinn, Estonia	Egypt	Hard (i)	(Estonia) Valeria Gorlats	(Egypt) Ola Abou Zekry (Egypt) Dina Hegab	L	2–6, 6–3, 6–7^{(3–7)}
