= 2017 Korea Open – Singles =

Singles
- 2017 Korea Open

Final
- Champion: (Latvia) Jeļena Ostapenko
- Runner-up: (Brazil) Beatriz Haddad Maia
- Score: 6–7^{(5–7)}, 6–1, 6–4

Details
- Draw: 32
- Seeds: 8

Events
Singles	Doubles
← 2016 ·	Korea Open	· 2018 →

Lara Arruabarrena was the defending champion, but lost in the first round to Ekaterina Alexandrova.

Jeļena Ostapenko won the title, defeating Beatriz Haddad Maia in the final, 6–7^{(5–7)}, 6–1, 6–4.

== Seeds ==
1. (Latvia) Jeļena Ostapenko (champion)
2. (Netherlands) Kiki Bertens (first round)
3. (Czech Republic) Kristýna Plíšková (first round)
4. (Romania) Sorana Cîrstea (quarterfinals)
5. (Romania) Irina-Camelia Begu (second round)
6. (Germany) Tatjana Maria (first round)
7. (Spain) Lara Arruabarrena (first round)
8. (United States) Christina McHale (first round)

== Draw ==
=== Key ===
- Q = Qualifier
- WC = Wild card
- LL = Lucky loser
- Alt = Alternate
- ITF = ITF entry
- PR = Protected ranking
- SR = Special ranking
- SE = Special exempt
- JE = Junior exempt
- JR = Junior Accelerator Programme entrant
- CO = College Accelerator Programme entrant
- NG = Next Gen Accelerator Program entrant
- w/o = Walkover
- r = Retired
- d = Defaulted

=== Finals ===
Semifinals
1	(Latvia) Jeļena Ostapenko	3	6	6
Q	(Thailand) Luksika Kumkhum	6	1	3
(Brazil) Beatriz Haddad Maia	6	7^{9}
(Netherlands) Richèl Hogenkamp	1	6^{7}

Final
1	(Latvia) Jeļena Ostapenko	6^{5}	6	6
(Brazil) Beatriz Haddad Maia	7^{7}	1	4

=== Top half ===
First round
1	(Latvia) J Ostapenko	7^{8}	6
(Sweden) J Larsson	6^{6}	1
(Japan) N Hibino	6	6
(Chinese Taipei) K-c Chang	2	4
(Paraguay) V Cepede Royg	6	6
Q	(Thailand) P Plipuech	3	2
(United States) K Ahn	7	7
6	(Germany) T Maria	5	5
4	(Romania) S Cîrstea	6	6
PR	(Japan) M Eguchi	1	3
WC	(South Korea) S-j Jang	3	5
(United States) N Gibbs	6	7
Q	(Thailand) L Kumkhum	3	6	6
(Colombia) M Duque Mariño	6	4	1
(Russia) E Alexandrova	6	7
7	(Spain) L Arruabarrena	3	5

Second round
1	(Latvia) J Ostapenko	6	6
(Japan) N Hibino	2	2
(Paraguay) V Cepede Royg	4	6	6
(United States) K Ahn	6	4	3
4	(Romania) S Cîrstea	6	6
(United States) N Gibbs	3	3
Q	(Thailand) L Kumkhum	6	6
(Russia) E Alexandrova	3	3

Quarterfinals
1	(Latvia) J Ostapenko	6	6
(Paraguay) V Cepede Royg	3	1
4	(Romania) S Cîrstea	3	1
Q	(Thailand) L Kumkhum	6	6

Semifinals
1	(Latvia) J Ostapenko	3	6	6
Q	(Thailand) L Kumkhum	6	1	3

=== Bottom half ===
First round
5	(Romania) I-C Begu	2	6	6
Q	(Thailand) V Wongteanchai	6	3	3
WC	(Ukraine) K Zavatska	6	3	1
(Brazil) B Haddad Maia	4	6	6
(Spain) S Sorribes Tormo	6	0	6
(United Kingdom) H Watson	3	6	1
WC	(South Korea) N-l Han	6	6
3	(Czech Republic) Kr Plíšková	4	4
8	(United States) C McHale	3	4
Q	(Netherlands) A Rus	6	6
Q	(Australia) P Hon	6	4	6
Q	(Czech Republic) K Muchová	1	6	4
(Germany) A Petkovic	2	5
(Czech Republic) D Allertová	6	7
(Netherlands) R Hogenkamp	5	6	6
2	(Netherlands) K Bertens	7	4	3

Second round
5	(Romania) I-C Begu	3	6	2
(Brazil) B Haddad Maia	6	4	6
(Spain) S Sorribes Tormo	6	6
WC	(South Korea) N-l Han	1	2
Q	(Netherlands) A Rus	5	4
Q	(Australia) P Hon	7	6
(Czech Republic) D Allertová	4	4
(Netherlands) R Hogenkamp	6	6

Quarterfinals
(Brazil) B Haddad Maia	6	6
(Spain) S Sorribes Tormo	4	4
Q	(Australia) P Hon	3	4
(Netherlands) R Hogenkamp	6	6

Semifinals
(Brazil) B Haddad Maia	6	7^{9}
(Netherlands) R Hogenkamp	1	6^{7}

== Qualifying ==
=== Seeds ===
1. (Czech Republic) Tereza Martincová (qualifying competition)
2. (Netherlands) Arantxa Rus (qualified)
3. (Thailand) Luksika Kumkhum (qualified)
4. (Japan) Miharu Imanishi (qualifying competition)
5. (Thailand) Peangtarn Plipuech (qualified)
6. (Czech Republic) Karolína Muchová (qualified)
7. (United States) Jennifer Elie (qualifying competition)
8. (Thailand) Varatchaya Wongteanchai (qualified)
9. (United Kingdom) Katy Dunne (qualifying competition)
10. (Australia) Priscilla Hon (qualified)
11. (Russia) Anna Morgina (qualifying competition)
12. (South Korea) Kim Na-ri (qualifying competition)

=== Qualifiers ===
1. (Australia) Priscilla Hon
2. (Netherlands) Arantxa Rus
3. (Thailand) Luksika Kumkhum
4. (Thailand) Varatchaya Wongteanchai
5. (Thailand) Peangtarn Plipuech
6. (Czech Republic) Karolína Muchová

=== Qualifying draw ===
==== First qualifier ====
First round
1	(Czech Republic) Tereza Martincová	6	6
WC	(South Korea) Jeong Yeong-won	4	2
(Australia) Olivia Tjandramulia	1	1
10	(Australia) Priscilla Hon	6	6

Qualifying competition
1	(Czech Republic) Tereza Martincová	1	2
10	(Australia) Priscilla Hon	6	6

==== Second qualifier ====
First round
2	(Netherlands) Arantxa Rus	6	6
WC	(South Korea) Kim Se-hyun	3	1
WC	(Georgia (country)) Oksana Kalashnikova	4	4
7	(United States) Jennifer Elie	6	6

Qualifying competition
2	(Netherlands) Arantxa Rus	6	7^{7}
7	(United States) Jennifer Elie	4	6^{2}

==== Third qualifier ====
First round
3	(Thailand) Luksika Kumkhum	6	7^{7}
(South Korea) Choi Ji-hee	1	6^{5}
WC	(South Korea) Ahn Yu-jin	5	1
9	(United Kingdom) Katy Dunne	7	6

Qualifying competition
3	(Thailand) Luksika Kumkhum	6	6
9	(United Kingdom) Katy Dunne	2	1

==== Fourth qualifier ====
First round
4	(Japan) Miharu Imanishi	6	6
WC	(South Korea) Kim Da-bin	2	1
WC	(South Korea) Ji Sun-ae	0	0
8	(Thailand) Varatchaya Wongteanchai	6	6

Qualifying competition
4	(Japan) Miharu Imanishi	6	5	1
8	(Thailand) Varatchaya Wongteanchai	2	7	6

==== Fifth qualifier ====
First round
5	(Thailand) Peangtarn Plipuech	6	6
(Chinese Taipei) Chuang Chia-jung	2	1
(South Korea) Park Sang-hee	3	2
12	(South Korea) Kim Na-ri	6	6

Qualifying competition
5	(Thailand) Peangtarn Plipuech	5	6	6
12	(South Korea) Kim Na-ri	7	2	1

==== Sixth qualifier ====
First round
6	(Czech Republic) Karolína Muchová	6	6
WC	(South Korea) Lee So-ra	2	4
(South Korea) Jeong Su-nam	3	6^{2}
11	(Russia) Anna Morgina	6	7^{7}

Qualifying competition
6	(Czech Republic) Karolína Muchová	6	6
11	(Russia) Anna Morgina	1	3
