= Eva Paalma =

Estonian tennis player

- Country (sports): Estonia
- Born: 21 December 1994 (age 30); Tallinn, Estonia
- Prize money: $5,712

Singles
- Career record: 29–29
- Career titles: 0
- Highest ranking: No. 934 (3 November 2014)

Doubles
- Career record: 17–11
- Career titles: 2 ITF
- Highest ranking: No. 691 (20 October 2014)

Team competitions
- Fed Cup: 5–5

Eva Paalma (born 21 December 1994) is a retired Estonian tennis player.

Paalma, who was born in Tallinn, won two doubles titles on the ITF Circuit in her career. On 20 October 2014, she reached her best doubles ranking of world No. 691.

Playing for the Estonia Fed Cup team, Paalma has a win–loss record of 5–5. (Note: Eva Paalma at the Billie Jean King Cup (archived)) According to the reports, Eva Paalma was a representative on the Student-Athlete Advisory Committee.

== ITF finals ==
=== Doubles (2–2) ===
Legend $25,000 tournaments $10,000 tournaments	Finals by surface Hard (2–1) Clay (0–1)

Outcome	No.	Date	Tournament	Surface	Partner	Opponents	Score
Runner-up	1.	22 October 2012	Stockholm, Sweden	Hard (i)	(Russia) Maria Mokh	(Sweden) Donika Bashota (Latvia) Jeļena Ostapenko	6–7^{(4–7)}, 1–6
Winner	1.	21 October 2013	Stockholm, Sweden	Hard (i)	(Russia) Maria Mokh	(Sweden) Emma Ek (Slovakia) Zuzana Luknárová	6–2, 6–2
Winner	2.	11 November 2013	Helsinki, Finland	Hard (i)	(Latvia) Jeļena Ostapenko	(Netherlands) Quirine Lemoine (Czech Republic) Martina Přádová	6–2, 5–7, [11–9]
Runner-up	2.	21 July 2014	Tallinn, Estonia	Clay	(Estonia) Julia Matojan	(Russia) Alexandra Artamonova (Sweden) Cornelia Lister	3–6, 2–6

== Fed Cup participation ==
=== Singles (1–2) ===
Edition	Stage	Date	Location	Against	Surface	Opponent	W/L	Score
2012 Fed Cup; Europe/Africa Zone Group I	P/O	4 February 2012	Eilat, Israel	Netherlands	Hard	(Netherlands) Kiki Bertens	L	2–6, 2–6
2013 Fed Cup; Europe/Africa Zone Group II	R/R	17 April 2013	Ulcinj, Montenegro	Tunisia	Clay	(Tunisia) Ons Jabeur	L	2–6, 2–6
2013 Fed Cup; Europe/Africa Zone Group II	P/O	20 April 2013	Ulcinj, Montenegro	South Africa	Clay	(South Africa) Madrie Le Roux	W	6–2, 6–1

=== Doubles (4–3) ===
Edition	Stage	Date	Location	Against	Surface	Partner	Opponents	W/L	Score
2012 Fed Cup; Europe/Africa Zone Group I	R/R	1 February 2012	Eilat, Israel	Bulgaria	Hard	(Estonia) Tatjana Vorobjova	(Bulgaria) Dia Evtimova (Bulgaria) Tsvetana Pironkova	L	0–6, 1–6
2013 Fed Cup; Europe/Africa Zone Group II	R/R	17 April 2013	Ulcinj, Montenegro	Tunisia	Clay	(Estonia) Tatjana Vorobjova	(Tunisia) Yosr Elmi (Tunisia) Mouna Jebri	W	6–0, 6–1
2013 Fed Cup; Europe/Africa Zone Group II	R/R	18 April 2013	Ulcinj, Montenegro	Latvia	Clay	(Estonia) Tatjana Vorobjova	(Latvia) Laura Gulbe (Latvia) Diāna Marcinkēviča	L	3–6, 5–7
2013 Fed Cup; Europe/Africa Zone Group II	R/R	19 April 2013	Ulcinj, Montenegro	Finland	Clay	(Estonia) Tatjana Vorobjova	(Finland) Ella Leivo (Finland) Milka-Emilia Pasanen	W	7–6^{(7–3)}, 6–1
2013 Fed Cup; Europe/Africa Zone Group II	P/O	20 April 2013	Ulcinj, Montenegro	South Africa	Clay	(Estonia) Tatjana Vorobjova	(South Africa) Natalie Grandin (South Africa) Madrie Le Roux	L	1–6, 3–6
2014 Fed Cup; Europe/Africa Zone Group III	R/R	5 February 2014	Tallinn, Estonia	Namibia	Hard (i)	(Estonia) Tatjana Vorobjova	(Namibia) Lesedi Sheya Jacobs (Namibia) Liniques Theron	W	7–5, 6–2
2014 Fed Cup; Europe/Africa Zone Group III	R/R	7 February 2014	Tallinn, Estonia	Armenia	Hard (i)	(Estonia) Tatjana Vorobjova	(Armenia) Lusine Chobanyan (Armenia) Ani Safaryan	W	6–3, 6–2
