= Erika Hendsel =

Estonian tennis player

- Country (sports): Estonia
- Born: 7 November 1997 (age 27); Tallinn, Estonia
- Prize money: $1,947

Singles
- Career record: 11–23
- Career titles: 0
- Highest ranking: No. 1101 (7 October 2013)

Doubles
- Career record: 2–8
- Career titles: 0

Team competitions
- Fed Cup: 0–2

Erika Hendsel (born 7 November 1997) is a retired Estonian tennis player.

On 7 October 2013, Hendsel reached her best singles ranking of World No. 1101.

Playing for Estonia at the Fed Cup, Hendsel has a win–loss record of 0–2.
