= Estonia Billie Jean King Cup team =

Estonian women's tennis team

Estonia
- Captain: Märten Tamla (2016–)
- ITF ranking: 55 (17 Nov 2025)
- Colors: light blue & white
- First year: 1992
- Years played: 33
- Ties played (W–L): 125 (59–66)
- Years in World Group: 2 (1–1)
- Most total wins: Maret Ani (43–25)
- Most singles wins: Kaia Kanepi (29–13)
- Most doubles wins: Maret Ani (23–6)
- Best doubles team: Maret Ani / Kaia Kanepi (11–3)
- Most ties played: Maret Ani (46)
- Most years played: Maret Ani, Kaia Kanepi, Margit Rüütel (13)
- Last updated on: 22 Nov 2025.

The Estonia Billie Jean King Cup team represents Estonia in the Billie Jean King Cup tennis competition and are governed by the Estonian Tennis Association.

Estonia has competed in Fed Cup since 1992.

In 2022, Estonia competes in the Europe/Africa Zone Group I.

== History ==
Estonia competed in its first Fed Cup in 1992.

=== 2009 ===
Estonia came through Europe/Africa Zone Group I and then edged Israel in a World Group II Play-off to qualify for World Group II for the first time just a year after promotion from Group II.

=== 2010 ===
In the Fed Cup World Group II Estonia won Argentina and advanced to World Group play-offs, where they lost 2–3 to Belgium.

== Current team (2025) ==
- Elena Malõgina
- Laura Rahnel
- Grete Gull
- Valeria Gorlatš
- Kiira Paškov

== Players ==
As of 2022.

Name	Years	First	Ties	Win/Loss		
Name	Years	First	Ties	Singles	Doubles	Total
Maret Ani	13	1998	46	20–19	23–6	43–25
Valeria Gorlats	5	2015	13	1–6	2–6	3–12
Kristina Grunberg	1	1994	1	0–1	–	0–1
Erika Hendsel	1	2013	2	0–2	–	0–2
Helene Holter	6	1992	21	8–8	3–9	11–17
Piret Ilves	1	1992	2	–	0–2	0–2
Anett Kaasik	2	2005	6	0–2	1–5	1–7
Kaia Kanepi	12	2000	36	28–11	13–4	41–15
Maria Lota Kaul	1	2017	2	0–2	–	0–2
Kaja Kõnd	2	1992	5	1–3	0–5	1–8
Anett Kontaveit	9	2011	27	22–7	4–10	26–17
Anet Angelika Koskel	1	2022	1	–	0–1	0–1
Helen Laupa	4	1995	15	4–2	4–7	8–9
Helina Lill	4	1994	11	1–8	2–5	3–13
Elena Malõgina	4	2018	12	1–9	1–5	2–14
Maileen Nuudi	4	2016	12	4–2	4–7	8–8
Saara Orav	3	2018	6	1–1	2–3	3–4
Eva Paalma	3	2012	8	1–2	4–3	5–5
Ilona Poljakova	6	1999	11	2–1	4–4	6–5
Margit Rüütel	13	1999	31	8–14	12–8	20–22
Katriin Saar	3	2018	8	0–4	0–5	0–9
Anett Schutting	4	2007	7	1–3	2–4	3–7
Julia Skripnik	2	2013	5	0–3	1–1	1–4
Liina Suurvarik	6	1995	23	8–8	10–5	18–13
Ande Tulp	1	1993	3	0–2	0–2	0–4
Tatjana Vorobjova	3	2012	9	0–2	4–5	4–7

== Results ==
=== 2000–2009 ===
Year	Competition	Date	Location	Opponent	Score	Result
2009	Group I, Europe/Africa, Round Robin (Group D)	4 February	Tallinn (EST)	Bulgaria	3–0	Won
2009	Group I, Europe/Africa, Round Robin (Group D)	5 February	Tallinn (EST)	Croatia	2–1	Won
2009	Group I, Europe/Africa, Promotional Play-Off	7 February	Tallinn (EST)	Belarus	2–0	Won
2009	World Group II play-offs	25–26 April	Tallinn (EST)	Israel	3–2	Won

=== 2010–2019 ===
Year	Competition	Date	Location	Opponent	Score	Result
2010	World Group II	6–7 February	Tallinn (EST)	Argentina	4–1	Won
2010	World Group play-offs	24–25 April	Hasselt (BEL)	Belgium	2–3	Lost
2011	World Group II	5–6 February	Tallinn (EST)	Spain	1–4	Lost
2011	World Group II play-offs	16–17 April	Minsk, (BLR)	Belarus	0–5	Lost
2012	Group I, Europe/Africa, Round Robin (Group A)	1 February	Eilat (ISR)	Bulgaria	0–3	Lost
2012	Group I, Europe/Africa, Round Robin (Group A)	2 February	Eilat (ISR)	Austria	1–2	Lost
2012	Group I, Europe/Africa, Relegation Play-Off	4 February	Eilat (ISR)	Netherlands	1–2	Lost
2013	Group II, Europe/Africa, Round Robin (Group A)	17 April	Ulcinj (MNT)	Tunisia	1–2	Lost
2013	Group II, Europe/Africa, Round Robin (Group A)	18 April	Ulcinj (MNT)	Latvia	0–3	Lost
2013	Group II, Europe/Africa, Round Robin (Group A)	19 April	Ulcinj (MNT)	Finland	0–2	Lost
2013	Group II, Europe/Africa, Relegation Play-offs	20 April	Ulcinj (MNT)	South Africa	1–2	Lost
2014	Group III, Europe/Africa, Round Robin (Group A)	5 February	Tallinn (EST)	Namibia	3–0	Won
2014	Group III, Europe/Africa, Round Robin (Group A)	7 February	Tallinn (EST)	Armenia	3–0	Won
2014	Group III, Europe/Africa, Promotional Play-offs	8 February	Tallinn (EST)	Denmark	2–0	Won
2015	Group II, Europe/Africa, Round Robin (Group A)	4 February	Tallinn (EST)	Bosnia and Herzegovina	3–0	Won
2015	Group II, Europe/Africa, Round Robin (Group A)	5 February	Tallinn (EST)	South Africa	1–2	Lost
2015	Group II, Europe/Africa, Round Robin (Group A)	6 February	Tallinn (EST)	Egypt	2–1	Won
2015	Group II, Europe/Africa, Promotional Play-offs	7 February	Tallinn (EST)	Slovenia	2–0	Won
2016	Group I, Europe/Africa, Round Robin (Group C)	3 February	Eilat (ISR)	Croatia	1–2	Lost
2016	Group I, Europe/Africa, Round Robin (Group C)	4 February	Eilat (ISR)	Israel	0–3	Lost
2016	Group I, Europe/Africa, Round Robin (Group C)	5 February	Eilat (ISR)	Turkey	2–1	Won
2017	Group I, Europe/Africa, Round Robin (Group D)	8 February	Tallinn (EST)	Bulgaria	2–1	Won
2017	Group I, Europe/Africa, Round Robin (Group D)	9 February	Tallinn (EST)	Israel	2–1	Won
2017	Group I, Europe/Africa, Round Robin (Group D)	10 February	Tallinn (EST)	Serbia	1–2	Lost
2017	Group I, Europe/Africa, 5th place play-off	11 February	Tallinn (EST)	Austria	1–2	Lost
2018	Group I, Europe/Africa, Round Robin (Group B)	8 February	Tallinn (EST)	Portugal	2–1	Won
2018	Group I, Europe/Africa, Round Robin (Group B)	9 February	Tallinn (EST)	(United Kingdom) Great Britain	0–3	Lost
2018	Group I, Europe/Africa, 5th place play-off	10 February	Tallinn (EST)	Croatia	2–1	Won
2019	Group I, Europe/Africa, Round Robin (Group B)	6 February	Zielona Góra (POL)	Bulgaria	1–2	Lost
2019	Group I, Europe/Africa, Round Robin (Group B)	7 February	Zielona Góra (POL)	Sweden	1–2	Lost
2019	Group I, Europe/Africa, Round Robin (Group B)	8 February	Zielona Góra (POL)	Ukraine	0–3	Lost
2019	Group I, Europe/Africa, Relegation Play-Off	9 February	Zielona Góra (POL)	Denmark	2–0	Won

=== 2020– ===
Year	Competition	Date	Location	Opponent	Score	Result
2020	Group I, Europe/Africa, Round Robin (Pool B)	5 February	Tallinn (EST)	Greece	1–2	Lost
2020	Group I, Europe/Africa, Round Robin (Pool B)	6 February	Tallinn (EST)	Italy	1–2	Lost
2020	Group I, Europe/Africa, Round Robin (Pool B)	7 February	Tallinn (EST)	Austria	2–1	Won
2020	Group I, Europe/Africa, Promotional Play-offs	8 February	Tallinn (EST)	Ukraine	1–2	Lost
2022	Group I, Europe/Africa (Pool A)	11 April	Antalya (TUR)	Serbia	1–2	Lost
2022	Group I, Europe/Africa (Pool A)	13 April	Antalya (TUR)	Turkey	1–2	Lost
2022	Group I, Europe/Africa (Pool A)	14 April	Antalya (TUR)	Denmark	1–2	Lost
2022	Group I, Europe/Africa (Pool A)	15 April	Antalya (TUR)	Hungary	0–3	Lost

== See also ==
- Billie Jean King Cup
- Estonia Davis Cup team
