= Tunisia Billie Jean King Cup team =

National tennis team

Tunisia
- Nations Ranking: 68 ▼3 (16 November 2015)
- Colors: red & white
- First year: 1992
- Years played: 17
- Ties played (W–L): 69 (34–35)
- Best finish: Zonal Group I RR (1992, 1993, 1994)
- Most total wins: Selima Sfar (41–24)
- Most singles wins: Selima Sfar (24–12)
- Most doubles wins: Selima Sfar (17–12)
- Best doubles team: Issem Essaies / Selima Sfar (10–5)
- Most ties played: Selima Sfar (36)
- Most years played: Selima Sfar (10)

The Tunisia Billie Jean King Cup team represents Tunisia in the Billie Jean King Cup tennis competition and are governed by the Fédération Tunisienne de Tennis.

== History ==
Tunisia competed in its first Fed Cup in 1992. Their best result was third place in its Group II pool on four occasions.

== See also ==
- Billie Jean King Cup
- Tunisia Davis Cup team
