= 2017 Fed Cup Europe/Africa Zone Group I – Pool D =

Subsection of tennis competition

Pool D of the 2017 Fed Cup Europe/Africa Zone Group I was one of four pools in the Europe/Africa zone of the 2017 Fed Cup. Four teams competed in a round robin competition, with the top team and the bottom team proceeding to their respective sections of the play-offs: the top team played for advancement to the World Group II Play-offs, while the bottom team faced potential relegation to Group II.

== Standings ==
		SRB	ISR	BUL	EST	RR; W–L	Set; W–L	Game; W–L	Standings
24	Serbia		2–1	2–1	2–1	3–0	12–7 (63%)	91–62 (59%)	1
33	Israel	1–2		1–2	1–2	0–3	9–12 (43%)	88–106 (45%)	4
38	Bulgaria	1–2	2–1		1–2	1–2	8–12 (40%)	84–103 (45%)	3
46	Estonia	1–2	2–1	2–1		2–1	11–9 (55%)	102–94 (52%)	2

Standings are determined by: 1. number of wins; 2. number of matches; 3. in two-team ties, head-to-head records; 4. in three-team ties, (a) percentage of sets won (head-to-head records if two teams remain tied), then (b) percentage of games won (head-to-head records if two teams remain tied), then (c) Fed Cup rankings.

== Round-robin ==
=== Serbia vs. Estonia ===
Serbia
2
Tallink Tennis Centre, Tallinn, Estonia
8 February 2017
Hard (indoors)

Estonia
1

			1	2	3
1	(Serbia) (Estonia)	Ivana Jorović; Valeria Gorlats	6; 0	6; 3
2	(Serbia) (Estonia)	Nina Stojanović; Anett Kontaveit	2; 6	5; 7
3	(Serbia) (Estonia)	Ivana Jorović / Nina Stojanović; Anett Kontaveit / Maileen Nuudi	6; 4	1; 6	7; 5

=== Israel vs. Bulgaria ===
Israel
1
Tallink Tennis Centre, Tallinn, Estonia
8 February 2017
Hard (indoors)

Bulgaria
2

			1	2	3
1	(Israel) (Bulgaria)	Deniz Khazaniuk; Viktoriya Tomova	4; 6	7; 5	2; 6
2	(Israel) (Bulgaria)	Julia Glushko; Elitsa Kostova	6; 3	7; 5
3	(Israel) (Bulgaria)	Julia Glushko / Shelly Krolitzky; Sesil Karatantcheva / Elitsa Kostova	6; 2	3; 6	5; 7

=== Serbia vs. Bulgaria ===
Serbia
2
Tallink Tennis Centre, Tallinn, Estonia
9 February 2017
Hard (indoors)

Bulgaria
1

			1	2	3
1	(Serbia) (Bulgaria)	Ivana Jorović; Viktoriya Tomova	6; 1	6; 1
2	(Serbia) (Bulgaria)	Nina Stojanović; Isabella Shinikova	6; 2	6; 2
3	(Serbia) (Bulgaria)	Bojana Marinković / Dejana Radanović; Sesil Karatancheva / Elitsa Kostova	1; 6	3; 6

=== Israel vs. Estonia ===
Israel
1
Tallink Tennis Centre, Tallinn, Estonia
9 February 2017
Hard (indoors)

Estonia
2

			1	2	3
1	(Israel) (Estonia)	Deniz Khazaniuk; Valeria Gorlats	6; 1	7; 5
2	(Israel) (Estonia)	Julia Glushko; Anett Kontaveit	4; 6	3; 6
3	(Israel) (Estonia)	Julia Glushko / Shelly Krolitzky; Anett Kontaveit / Maileen Nuudi	7; 5	5; 7	3; 6

=== Serbia vs. Israel ===
Serbia
2
Tallink Tennis Centre, Tallinn, Estonia
10 February 2017
Hard (indoors)

Israel
1

			1	2	3
1	(Serbia) (Israel)	Ivana Jorović; Maya Tahan	6; 1	6; 0
2	(Serbia) (Israel)	Nina Stojanović; Deniz Khazaniuk	4; 6	2; 6
3	(Serbia) (Israel)	Ivana Jorović / Nina Stojanović; Deniz Khazaniuk / Maya Tahan				w/o

=== Bulgaria vs. Estonia ===
Bulgaria
1
Tallink Tennis Centre, Tallinn, Estonia
10 February 2017
Hard (indoors)

Estonia
2

			1	2	3
1	(Bulgaria) (Estonia)	Isabella Shinikova; Kaia Kanepi	7; 5	7; 5
2	(Bulgaria) (Estonia)	Elitsa Kostova; Anett Kontaveit	1; 6	3; 6
3	(Bulgaria) (Estonia)	Sesil Karatantcheva / Isabella Shinikova; Anett Kontaveit / Maileen Nuudi	3; 6	5; 7
