= 2019 Baltic Open – Singles =

International tennis competition held in Latvia

Singles
- 2019 Baltic Open

Final
- Champion: (Latvia) Anastasija Sevastova
- Runner-up: (Poland) Katarzyna Kawa
- Score: 3–6, 7–5, 6–4

Details
- Draw: 32
- Seeds: 8

Events
Singles	Doubles
- Baltic Open

This was the first edition of the tournament.

Anastasija Sevastova won the title, defeating Katarzyna Kawa in the final, 3–6, 7–5, 6–4. It was her fourth WTA Tour title.

== Seeds ==
1. (Latvia) Anastasija Sevastova (champion)
2. (France) Caroline Garcia (second round)
3. (Czech Republic) Kateřina Siniaková (first round)
4. (Belarus) Aliaksandra Sasnovich (first round)
5. (Russia) Margarita Gasparyan (first round, retired)
6. (Russia) Anastasia Potapova (semifinals)
7. (Germany) Tatjana Maria (first round)
8. (Latvia) Jeļena Ostapenko (first round)

== Draw ==
Key

- Q = Qualifier
- WC = Wild card
- LL = Lucky loser
- Alt = Alternate
- ITF = ITF entry
- PR = Protected ranking
- SR = Special ranking
- SE = Special exempt
- JE = Junior exempt
- JR = Junior Accelerator Programme entrant
- CO = College Accelerator Programme entrant
- NG = Next Gen Accelerator Program entrant
- w/o = Walkover
- r = Retired
- d = Defaulted

=== Finals ===
Semifinals
1	(Latvia) Anastasija Sevastova	6	6
6	(Russia) Anastasia Potapova	4	2
(United States) Bernarda Pera	2	3
Q	(Poland) Katarzyna Kawa	6	6

Final
1	(Latvia) Anastasija Sevastova	3	7	6
Q	(Poland) Katarzyna Kawa	6	5	4

=== Top half ===
First round
1	(Latvia) A Sevastova	6	6
(Russia) V Flink	2	1
(Romania) A Bogdan	3	6^{5}
(Slovenia) D Jakupović	6	7^{7}
(Romania) S Cîrstea	0	4
Q	(Russia) V Ivakhnenko	6	6
(Romania) I Bara	6	4	4
5	(Russia) M Gasparyan	4	6	0^{r}
3	(Czech Republic) K Siniaková	6	4	1
(Ukraine) A Kalinina	4	6	6
(India) A Raina	2	1
PR	(Romania) PM Țig	6	6
WC	(Russia) K Rakhimova	4	3
WC	(Latvia) D Marcinkēviča	6	6
Q	(Austria) B Haas	2	3
6	(Russia) A Potapova	6	6

Second round
1	(Latvia) A Sevastova	6^{3}	6	6
(Slovenia) D Jakupović	7^{7}	2	4
Q	(Russia) V Ivakhnenko	6^{6}	6	1
(Romania) I Bara	7^{8}	3	6
(Ukraine) A Kalinina	4	4
PR	(Romania) PM Țig	6	6
WC	(Latvia) D Marcinkēviča	1	6	2
6	(Russia) A Potapova	6	4	6

Quarterfinals
1	(Latvia) A Sevastova	7^{7}	6
(Romania) I Bara	6^{3}	2
PR	(Romania) PM Țig	4	6	4
6	(Russia) A Potapova	6	0	6

Semifinals
1	(Latvia) A Sevastova	6	6
6	(Russia) A Potapova	4	2

=== Bottom half ===
First round
8	(Latvia) J Ostapenko	2	1
(United States) B Pera	6	6
(Kazakhstan) E Rybakina	6	6
(China) X Han	1	2
Q	(Argentina) P Ormaechea	6	4
(Slovakia) K Kučová	4	1^{r}
Q	(Serbia) N Stojanović	4	6	6
4	(Belarus) A Sasnovich	6	3	4
7	(Germany) T Maria	4	6	4
WC	(Croatia) J Fett	6	1	6
Q	(Poland) K Kawa	2	6	6
(Belgium) Y Bonaventure	6	4	1
(France) C Paquet	6	7
Q	(Turkey) B Eraydın	3	5
(Czech Republic) Kr Plíšková	3	7^{8}	6^{6}
2	(France) C Garcia	6	6^{6}	7^{8}

Second round
(United States) B Pera	4	6	6
(Kazakhstan) E Rybakina	6	0	2
Q	(Argentina) P Ormaechea	0	3
Q	(Serbia) N Stojanović	6	6
WC	(Croatia) J Fett	3	0
Q	(Poland) K Kawa	6	6
(France) C Paquet	4	6	6
2	(France) C Garcia	6	4	3

Quarterfinals
(United States) B Pera	4	6	6
Q	(Serbia) N Stojanović	6	4	3
Q	(Poland) K Kawa	6	6
(France) C Paquet	2	2

Semifinals
(United States) B Pera	2	3
Q	(Poland) K Kawa	6	6

== Qualifying ==
=== Seeds ===
1. (Austria) Barbara Haas (qualified)
2. (Argentina) Paula Ormaechea (qualified)
3. (Poland) Katarzyna Kawa (qualified)
4. (Serbia) Nina Stojanović (qualified)
5. (Turkey) Başak Eraydın (qualified)
6. (Russia) Valentina Ivakhnenko (qualified)
7. (United Kingdom) Naiktha Bains (qualifying competition)
8. (Bulgaria) Isabella Shinikova (qualifying competition)
9. (Norway) Ulrikke Eikeri (qualifying competition)
10. (Austria) Julia Grabher (qualifying competition)
11. (France) Harmony Tan (qualifying competition)
12. (Belgium) Marie Benoît (qualifying competition)

=== Qualifiers ===
1. (Austria) Barbara Haas
2. (Argentina) Paula Ormaechea
3. (Poland) Katarzyna Kawa
4. (Serbia) Nina Stojanović
5. (Turkey) Başak Eraydın
6. (Russia) Valentina Ivakhnenko

=== Draw ===
==== First qualifier ====
First round
1	(Austria) Barbara Haas	6	6
(United Kingdom) Francesca Jones	2	2
WC	(Latvia) Kamilla Bartone	6^{3}	3
10	(Austria) Julia Grabher	7^{7}	6

Qualifying competition
1	(Austria) Barbara Haas	6	6
10	(Austria) Julia Grabher	0	4

==== Second qualifier ====
First round
2	(Argentina) Paula Ormaechea	5	6	6
(Serbia) Dejana Radanović	7	1	3
WC	(South Africa) Zoë Kruger	2	4
8	(Bulgaria) Isabella Shinikova	6	6

Qualifying competition
2	(Argentina) Paula Ormaechea	7	6
8	(Bulgaria) Isabella Shinikova	5	3

==== Third qualifier ====
First round
3	(Poland) Katarzyna Kawa	6	3	7^{7}
(Kazakhstan) Anna Danilina	4	6	6^{5}
(Venezuela) Andrea Gámiz	4	6	3
7	(United Kingdom) Naiktha Bains	6	1	6

Qualifying competition
3	(Poland) Katarzyna Kawa	6	6
7	(United Kingdom) Naiktha Bains	1	2

==== Fourth qualifier ====
First round
4	(Serbia) Nina Stojanović	6	6
(Russia) Marina Melnikova	4	4
(Germany) Jasmin Jebawy	2	2
11	(France) Harmony Tan	6	6

Qualifying competition
4	(Serbia) Nina Stojanović	6	6
11	(France) Harmony Tan	2	2

==== Fifth qualifier ====
First round
5	(Turkey) Başak Eraydın	6	6
WC	(Russia) Ksenia Aleshina	1	0
(Latvia) Daniela Vismane	0	0^{r}
9	(Norway) Ulrikke Eikeri	6	3

Qualifying competition
5	(Turkey) Başak Eraydın	6	4	7^{7}
9	(Norway) Ulrikke Eikeri	3	6	6^{4}

==== Sixth qualifier ====
First round
6	(Russia) Valentina Ivakhnenko	6	6
WC	(Kazakhstan) Galina Voskoboeva	1	2
(Uzbekistan) Akgul Amanmuradova	5	2
12	(Belgium) Marie Benoît	7	6

Qualifying competition
6	(Russia) Valentina Ivakhnenko	6	4	6
12	(Belgium) Marie Benoît	4	6	4

== Sources ==
- Main Draw
- Qualifying Draw
