= 2017 Fed Cup Europe/Africa Zone Group I – play-offs =

Subsection of tennis competition

The play-offs of the 2017 Fed Cup Europe/Africa Zone Group I were the final stages of the Group I zonal competition involving teams from Europe and Africa. Using the positions determined in their pools, the fourteen teams faced off to determine their placing in the 2017 Fed Cup Europe/Africa Zone Group I. The top two teams advanced to World Group II play-offs, and the bottom two teams were relegated to the Europe/Africa Zone Group II.

== Pool results ==
Placing	Pool A	Pool B	Pool C	Pool D
1	Poland	Croatia	Great Britain	Serbia
2	Austria	Hungary	Latvia	Estonia
3	—	—	Turkey	Bulgaria
4	Georgia	Bosnia and Herzegovina	Portugal	Israel

== Promotional play-offs ==
The first placed teams of each pool were drawn in head-to-head rounds. The winner of each round advanced to the World Group II play-offs.

=== Poland vs. Serbia ===
Poland
1
Tallink Tennis Centre, Tallinn, Estonia
11 February 2017
Hard (indoors)

Serbia
2

			1	2	3
1	(Poland) (Serbia)	Katarzyna Piter; Ivana Jorović	2; 6	6; 4	4; 6
2	(Poland) (Serbia)	Magda Linette; Nina Stojanović	6; 2	6; 1
3	(Poland) (Serbia)	Magda Linette / Katarzyna Piter; Ivana Jorović / Nina Stojanović	6; 4	4; 6	1; 6

=== Croatia vs. Great Britain ===
Croatia
1
Tallink Tennis Centre, Tallinn, Estonia
11 February 2017
Hard (indoors)

Great Britain
2

			1	2	3
1	(Croatia) (United Kingdom)	Donna Vekić; Heather Watson	2; 6	4; 6
2	(Croatia) (United Kingdom)	Ana Konjuh; Johanna Konta	6; 4	6; 3
3	(Croatia) (United Kingdom)	Darija Jurak / Ana Konjuh; Johanna Konta / Heather Watson	6; 4	4; 6	3; 6

== 5th place play-off ==
The runner-up teams from pools A and D, and B and C competed in order to establish which two teams would place joint fifth in the final standings and which two would place joint seventh.

=== Austria vs. Estonia ===
Austria
2
Tallink Tennis Centre, Tallinn, Estonia
11 February 2017
Hard (indoors)

Estonia
1

			1	2	3
1	(Austria) (Estonia)	Tamira Paszek; Maileen Nuudi	6; 2	6; 3
2	(Austria) (Estonia)	Barbara Haas; Maria Lota Kaul	6; 3	2; 6	6; 0
3	(Austria) (Estonia)	Julia Grabher / Pia König; Valeria Gorlats / Maileen Nuudi	5; 7	5; 7

=== Hungary vs. Latvia ===
Hungary
2
Tallink Tennis Centre, Tallinn, Estonia
11 February 2017
Hard (indoors)

Latvia
0

			1	2	3
1	(Hungary) (Latvia)	Ágnes Bukta; Daniela Vismane	6; 2	6; 3
2	(Hungary) (Latvia)	Fanny Stollár; Diāna Marcinkēviča	6; 2	4; 6	6; 3
3	(Hungary) (Latvia)	Dalma Gálfi / Fanny Stollár; Diāna Marcinkēviča / Daniela Vismane				not played

== Relegation play-offs ==
The teams placing last in each pool competed to keep their place in the Europe/Africa Zone Group I. The bottom-placed team from group A faced the bottom-placed team from Group D, whilst Group B's and Group C's bottom-placed teams faced off. The losers were relegated to the 2018 Europe/Africa Zone Group II.

=== Georgia vs. Israel ===
Georgia
2
Tallink Tennis Centre, Tallinn, Estonia
11 February 2017
Hard (indoors)

Israel
1

			1	2	3
1	(Georgia (country)) (Israel)	Ekaterine Gorgodze; Deniz Khazaniuk	6; 4	4; 6	7; 5
2	(Georgia (country)) (Israel)	Sofia Shapatava; Julia Glushko	4; 6	6; 2	2; 6
3	(Georgia (country)) (Israel)	Oksana Kalashnikova / Sofia Shapatava; Julia Glushko / Shelly Krolitzky	6; 4	4; 6	6; 3

=== Bosnia and Herzegovina vs. Portugal ===
Bosnia and Herzegovina
1
Tallink Tennis Centre, Tallinn, Estonia
11 February 2017
Hard (indoors)

Portugal
2

			1	2	3
1	(Bosnia and Herzegovina) (Portugal)	Jelena Simić; Inês Murta	4; 6	0; 6
2	(Bosnia and Herzegovina) (Portugal)	Dea Herdželaš; Michelle Larcher de Brito	1; 6	2; 6
3	(Bosnia and Herzegovina) (Portugal)	Nefisa Berberović / Anita Husarić; Francisca Jorge / Rita Vilaça	6; 4	7^{7} 6^{4}

== Final placements ==
Placing	Teams	
Promoted/First	Serbia	Great Britain
Third	Poland	Croatia
Fifth	Austria	Hungary
Seventh	Estonia	Latvia
Ninth	Bulgaria	Turkey
Eleventh	Georgia	Portugal
Relegated/Thirteenth	Israel	Bosnia and Herzegovina

- Serbia and Great Britain advanced to World Group II play-offs.
- Israel and Bosnia and Herzegovina were relegated to Europe/Africa Group II in 2018.
