= Maileen Nuudi =

Estonian tennis player (born 2000)

- Country (sports): Estonia
- Born: 24 May 2000 (age 26)
- Plays: Right (two-handed backhand)
- Prize money: $41,859

Singles
- Career record: 133–137
- Career titles: 2 ITF
- Highest ranking: No. 469 (27 November 2023)
- Current ranking: No. 1,271 (23 December 2024)

Doubles
- Career record: 37–42
- Career titles: 1 ITF
- Highest ranking: No. 596 (21 August 2023)
- Current ranking: No. 934 (23 December 2024)

Team competitions
- Fed Cup: 13–11
- Last updated on: 23 December 2024.

Maileen Nuudi (born 24 May 2000) is an Estonian tennis player.

Playing for the Estonia Billie Jean King Cup team, Nuudi has a win/loss record of 13–11, as of August 2024.

She made her WTA Tour debut as a wildcard entrant at the 2022 Tallinn Open, losing to second seed Donna Vekić in the first round.

== ITF Circuit finals ==
=== Singles: 3 (3 titles) ===
Legend W15 tournaments	Finals by surface Clay (3–0)

Result	W–L	Date	Tournament	Tier	Surface	Opponent	Score
Win	1–0	Jun 2022	ITF Alkmaar, Netherlands	W15	Clay	(United States) Chiara Scholl	6–2, 5–7, 6–4
Win	2–0	Aug 2022	ITF Eindhoven, Netherlands	W15	Clay	(Netherlands) Anouck Vrancken Peeters	6–3, 7–5
Win	3–0	Oct 2026	ITF Székesfehérvár, Hungary	W15	Clay (i)	(Hungary) Lujza Béviz	6–3, 6–2

=== Doubles: 2 (1 title, 1 runner-up) ===
Legend W25 tournaments W15 tournaments	Finals by surface Hard (0–1) Clay (1–0)

Result	W–L	Date	Tournament	Tier	Surface	Partner	Opponents	Score
Loss	0–1	Oct 2018	ITF Lousada, Portugal	W15	Hard (i)	(Portugal) Francisca Jorge	(Germany) Katharina Hering (Spain) Olga Parres Azcoitia	2–6, 2–6
Win	1–1	Aug 2023	ITF Koksijde, Belgium	W25	Clay	(Sweden) Kajsa Rinaldo Persson	(Netherlands) Eva Vedder (Netherlands) Judith Visscher	6–3, 2–6, [10–5]

== Fed Cup participation ==
=== Singles ===
Edition	Stage	Date	Location	Against	Surface	Opponent	W/L	Score
2017 Fed Cup; Europe/Africa Zone Group I	P/O	11 February 2017	Tallinn, Estonia	Austria	Hard (i)	(Austria) Tamira Paszek	L	2–6, 3–6

=== Doubles ===
Edition	Stage	Date	Location	Against	Surface	Partner	Opponents	W/L	Score
2016 Fed Cup; Europe/Africa Zone Group I	R/R	4 February 2016	Eilat, Israel	Israel	Hard	(Estonia) Valeria Gorlats	(Israel) Julia Glushko (Israel) Shahar Pe'er	L	3–6, 2–6
2016 Fed Cup; Europe/Africa Zone Group I	R/R	5 February 2016	Eilat, Israel	Turkey	Hard	(Estonia) Anett Kontaveit	(Turkey) Çağla Büyükakçay (Turkey) İpek Soylu	W	6–4, 6–2
2017 Fed Cup; Europe/Africa Zone Group I	R/R	8 February 2017	Tallinn, Estonia	Serbia	Hard (i)	(Estonia) Anett Kontaveit	(Serbia) Ivana Jorović (Serbia) Nina Stojanović	L	4–6, 6–1, 5–7
2017 Fed Cup; Europe/Africa Zone Group I	R/R	9 February 2017	Tallinn, Estonia	Israel	Hard (i)	(Estonia) Anett Kontaveit	(Israel) Julia Glushko (Israel) Shelly Krolitzky	W	5–7, 7–5, 6–3
2017 Fed Cup; Europe/Africa Zone Group I	R/R	10 February 2017	Tallinn, Estonia	Bulgaria	Hard (i)	(Estonia) Anett Kontaveit	(Bulgaria) Sesil Karatantcheva (Bulgaria) Isabella Shinikova	W	6–3, 7–5
2017 Fed Cup; Europe/Africa Zone Group I	P/O	11 February 2017	Tallinn, Estonia	Austria	Hard (i)	(Estonia) Valeria Gorlats	(Austria) Julia Grabher (Austria) Pia König	W	7–5, 7–5
2019 Fed Cup; Europe/Africa Zone Group I	R/R	6 February 2019	Zielona Góra, Poland	Bulgaria	Hard (i)	(Estonia) Anett Kontaveit	(Bulgaria) Isabella Shinikova (Bulgaria) Viktoriya Tomova	L	2–6, 2–6
