= 2019 Baltic Open – Doubles =

International tennis competition held in Latvia

Doubles
- 2019 Baltic Open

Final
- Champion: (Canada) Sharon Fichman (Serbia) Nina Stojanović
- Runner-up: (Latvia) Jeļena Ostapenko (Kazakhstan) Galina Voskoboeva
- Score: 2–6, 7–6^{(7–1)}, [10–6]

Events
Singles	Doubles
Baltic Open	· 2020 →

This was the first edition of the tournament.

Sharon Fichman and Nina Stojanović won the title, defeating Jeļena Ostapenko and Galina Voskoboeva in the final, 2–6, 7–6^{(7–1)}, [10–6].

== Seeds ==
1. (Latvia) Jeļena Ostapenko / (Kazakhstan) Galina Voskoboeva (final)
2. (Australia) Monique Adamczak / (China) Han Xinyun (first round)
3. (Romania) Irina Bara / (Slovenia) Dalila Jakupović (semifinals)
4. (Georgia (country)) Oksana Kalashnikova / (Japan) Ena Shibahara (quarterfinals)

== Draw ==
=== Key ===
- Q = Qualifier
- WC = Wild card
- LL = Lucky loser
- Alt = Alternate
- SE = Special exempt
- PR = Protected ranking
- ITF = ITF entry
- JE = Junior exempt
- w/o = Walkover
- r = Retired
- d = Defaulted
- SR = Special ranking

=== Draw ===
First round
1	(Latvia) J Ostapenko (Kazakhstan) G Voskoboeva	5	6	[10]
(Germany) V Heisen (Latvia) D Marcinkēviča	7	0	[8]
(Kazakhstan) A Danilina (Russia) V Ivakhnenko	2	6	[8]
(Russia) A Potapova (Russia) Y Sizikova	6	2	[10]
3	(Romania) I Bara (Slovenia) D Jakupović	4	6	[10]
(Venezuela) A Gámiz (Argentina) P Ormaechea	6	2	[8]
(Indonesia) B Gumulya (Indonesia) J Rompies	7^{7}	3	[10]
Alt	(Poland) K Kawa (India) A Raina	6^{3}	6	[12]
WC	(Russia) K Aleshina (Latvia) K Bartone	2	1
(Canada) S Fichman (Serbia) N Stojanović	6	6
(Romania) A Bogdan (Bulgaria) I Shinikova	2	2
4	(Georgia (country)) O Kalashnikova (Japan) E Shibahara	6	6
(Russia) N Dzalamidze (Poland) P Kania	6	6
WC	(Russia) V Pepelyaeva (Russia) A Tikhonova	1	1
(Norway) U Eikeri (France) E Lechemia	7^{7}	6
2	(Australia) M Adamczak (China) X Han	6^{5}	2

Quarterfinals
1	(Latvia) J Ostapenko (Kazakhstan) G Voskoboeva	6	6
(Russia) A Potapova (Russia) Y Sizikova	4	2
3	(Romania) I Bara (Slovenia) D Jakupović	6	6
Alt	(Poland) K Kawa (India) A Raina	0	2
(Canada) S Fichman (Serbia) N Stojanović	2	6	[10]
4	(Georgia (country)) O Kalashnikova (Japan) E Shibahara	6	3	[3]
(Russia) N Dzalamidze (Poland) P Kania	5	2
(Norway) U Eikeri (France) E Lechemia	7	6

Semifinals
1	(Latvia) J Ostapenko (Kazakhstan) G Voskoboeva	7^{7}	6
3	(Romania) I Bara (Slovenia) D Jakupović	6^{1}	2
(Canada) S Fichman (Serbia) N Stojanović	6	3	[10]
(Norway) U Eikeri (France) E Lechemia	3	6	[3]

Final
1	(Latvia) J Ostapenko (Kazakhstan) G Voskoboeva	6	6^{1}	[6]
(Canada) S Fichman (Serbia) N Stojanović	2	7^{7}	[10]

== Sources ==
- Main Draw
