= 2016 Fed Cup Europe/Africa Zone Group I – Pool C =

Women's tennis tournament results

Pool C of the 2016 Fed Cup Europe/Africa Zone Group I was one of four pools in the Europe/Africa zone of the 2016 Fed Cup. Four teams competed in a round robin competition, with the top team and the bottom team proceeding to their respective sections of the play-offs: the top team played for advancement to the World Group II Play-offs, while the bottom team faced potential relegation to Group II.

== Standings ==
		(Croatia) CRO	(Turkey) TUR	(Israel) ISR	(Estonia) EST	RR; W–L	Set; W–L	Game; W–L	Standings
25	Croatia		2–1	1–2	2–1	2–1	13–9	111–94	2
31	Turkey	1–2		2–1	1–2	1–2	9–12	107–107	4
35	Israel	2–1	1–2		3–0	2–1	13–6	109–92	1
53	Estonia	1–2	2–1	0–3		1–2	7–13	70–104	3

== Round-robin ==
=== Croatia vs. Estonia ===
Croatia
2
Municipal Tennis Centre, Eilat, Israel
3 February 2016
Hard (outdoors)

Estonia
1

			1	2	3
1	(Croatia) (Estonia)	Tena Lukas; Valeria Gorlats	6; 2	3; 6	6; 1
2	(Croatia) (Estonia)	Ana Konjuh; Anett Kontaveit	6; 4	3; 6	4; 6
3	(Croatia) (Estonia)	Darija Jurak / Ana Konjuh; Valeria Gorlats / Anett Kontaveit	6; 0	6; 1

=== Israel vs. Turkey ===
Israel
1
Municipal Tennis Centre, Eilat, Israel
3 February 2016
Hard (outdoors)

Turkey
2

			1	2	3
1	(Israel) (Turkey)	Shahar Pe'er; İpek Soylu	7; 5	3; 6	2; 6
2	(Israel) (Turkey)	Julia Glushko; Çağla Büyükakçay	5; 7	3; 6
3	(Israel) (Turkey)	Julia Glushko / Shahar Pe'er; Çağla Büyükakçay / Başak Eraydın	5; 7	7; 5	6; 4

=== Croatia vs. Turkey ===
Croatia
2
Municipal Tennis Centre, Eilat, Israel
4 February 2016
Hard (outdoors)

Turkey
1

			1	2	3
1	(Croatia) (Turkey)	Tena Lukas; İpek Soylu	7^{7} 6^{4}	7; 5
2	(Croatia) (Turkey)	Ana Konjuh; Çağla Büyükakçay	3; 6	6; 2	3; 6
3	(Croatia) (Turkey)	Darija Jurak / Ana Konjuh; Çağla Büyükakçay / Pemra Özgen	7; 5	6; 3

=== Israel vs. Estonia ===
Israel
3
Municipal Tennis Centre, Eilat, Israel
4 February 2016
Hard (outdoors)

Estonia
0

			1	2	3
1	(Israel) (Estonia)	Shahar Pe'er; Valeria Gorlats	6; 0	6; 3
2	(Israel) (Estonia)	Julia Glushko; Anett Kontaveit	6; 3	6; 3
3	(Israel) (Estonia)	Julia Glushko / Shahar Pe'er; Valeria Gorlats / Maileen Nuudi	6; 3	6; 2

=== Israel vs. Croatia ===
Israel
2
Municipal Tennis Centre, Eilat, Israel
5 February 2016
Hard (outdoors)

Croatia
1

			1	2	3
1	(Israel) (Croatia)	Shahar Pe'er; Tena Lukas	3; 6	6; 1	6; 2
2	(Israel) (Croatia)	Julia Glushko; Ana Konjuh	6^{4} 7^{7}	1; 6
3	(Israel) (Croatia)	Julia Glushko / Shahar Pe'er; Darija Jurak / Ana Konjuh	6; 4	7^{7} 6^{2}

=== Turkey vs. Estonia ===
Turkey
1
Municipal Tennis Centre, Eilat, Israel
5 February 2016
Hard (outdoors)

Estonia
2

			1	2	3
1	(Turkey) (Estonia)	Başak Eraydın; Valeria Gorlats	6; 2	6; 3
2	(Turkey) (Estonia)	Çağla Büyükakçay; Anett Kontaveit	6^{6} 7^{8}	4; 6
3	(Turkey) (Estonia)	Çağla Büyükakçay / İpek Soylu; Anett Kontaveit / Maileen Nuudi	4; 6	2; 6
