= 2019 Baltic Open =

International tennis competition held in Latvia

- Date: 22 – 28 July
- Edition: 1st
- Category: WTA International
- Draw: 32S / 16D
- Prize money: $250,000
- Surface: Clay court
- Location: Jūrmala, Latvia
- Venue: National Tennis Centre Lielupe

Champions

Singles
- (Latvia) Anastasija Sevastova

Doubles
- (Canada) Sharon Fichman / (Serbia) Nina Stojanović
Baltic Open	· 2020 →

The 2019 Baltic Open was a professional tennis tournament played on clay courts. It was the 1st edition of the Baltic Open as part of the WTA International tournaments of the 2019 WTA Tour. It took place at the National Tennis Centre Lielupe in Jūrmala, Latvia, from 22 to 28 July 2019.

This tournament replaced the Moscow River Cup on the WTA Tour.

== Points and prize money ==
=== Point distribution ===
Event	W	F	SF	QF	Round of 16	Round of 32	Q	Q2	Q1
Singles	280	180	110	60	30	1	18	12	1
Doubles	280	180	110	60	1	—	—	—	—

=== Prize money ===
Event	W	F	SF	QF	Round of 16	Round of 32	Q2	Q1
Women's singles	$43,000	$21,400	$11,500	$6,175	$3,400	$2,100	$1,020	$600
Women's doubles	$12,300	$6,400	$3,435	$1,820	$960	—	—	—

== Singles main draw entrants ==
=== Seeds ===
Country	Player	Rank^{1}	Seed
LAT	Anastasija Sevastova	11	1
FRA	Caroline Garcia	22	2
CZE	Kateřina Siniaková	40	3
BLR	Aliaksandra Sasnovich	42	4
RUS	Margarita Gasparyan	59	5
RUS	Anastasia Potapova	69	6
GER	Tatjana Maria	70	7
LAT	Jeļena Ostapenko	79	8

- Rankings as of July 15, 2019.

=== Other entrants ===
The following players received wildcards into the singles main draw:

- (Croatia) Jana Fett
- (Latvia) Diāna Marcinkēviča
- (Russia) Kamilla Rakhimova

The following player received entry using a protected ranking into the main draw:

- (Romania) Patricia Maria Țig

The following players received entry from the qualifying draw:

- (Turkey) Başak Eraydın
- (Austria) Barbara Haas
- (Russia) Valentina Ivakhnenko
- (Poland) Katarzyna Kawa
- (Argentina) Paula Ormaechea
- (Serbia) Nina Stojanović

=== Withdrawals ===
Before the tournament

- (Russia) Vitalia Diatchenko → replaced by (France) Chloé Paquet
- (Serbia) Ivana Jorović → replaced by (China) Han Xinyun
- (Estonia) Kaia Kanepi → replaced by (Ukraine) Anhelina Kalinina
- (Russia) Daria Kasatkina → replaced by (Russia) Varvara Flink
- (Russia) Veronika Kudermetova → replaced by (Slovakia) Kristína Kučová
- (Ukraine) Kateryna Kozlova → replaced by (Romania) Patricia Maria Țig
- (Belarus) Vera Lapko → replaced by (Kazakhstan) Elena Rybakina
- (Kazakhstan) Yulia Putintseva → replaced by (Romania) Ana Bogdan
- (Russia) Evgeniya Rodina → replaced by (Czech Republic) Kristýna Plíšková
- (Belgium) Alison Van Uytvanck → replaced by (Belgium) Ysaline Bonaventure

=== Retirements ===
- (Russia) Margarita Gasparyan
- (Slovakia) Kristína Kučová

== Doubles main draw entrants ==
=== Seeds ===
Country	Player	Country	Player	Rank^{1}	Seed
LAT	Jeļena Ostapenko	KAZ	Galina Voskoboeva	72	1
AUS	Monique Adamczak	CHN	Han Xinyun	117	2
ROU	Irina Bara	SLO	Dalila Jakupović	156	3
GEO	Oksana Kalashnikova	JPN	Ena Shibahara	165	4

- ^{1} Rankings as of July 15, 2019

=== Other entrants ===
The following pairs received wildcards into the doubles main draw:

- (Russia) Ksenia Aleshina / (Latvia) Kamilla Bartone
- (Russia) Veronika Pepelyaeva / (Russia) Anastasia Tikhonova

== Champions ==
=== Singles ===
- (Latvia) Anastasija Sevastova def. (Poland) Katarzyna Kawa, 3–6, 7–5, 6–4

=== Doubles ===
- (Canada) Sharon Fichman / (Serbia) Nina Stojanović def. (Latvia) Jeļena Ostapenko / (Kazakhstan) Galina Voskoboeva, 2–6, 7–6^{(7–1)}, [10–6]
