= Nina Stojanović =

Serbian professional tennis player (born 1996)

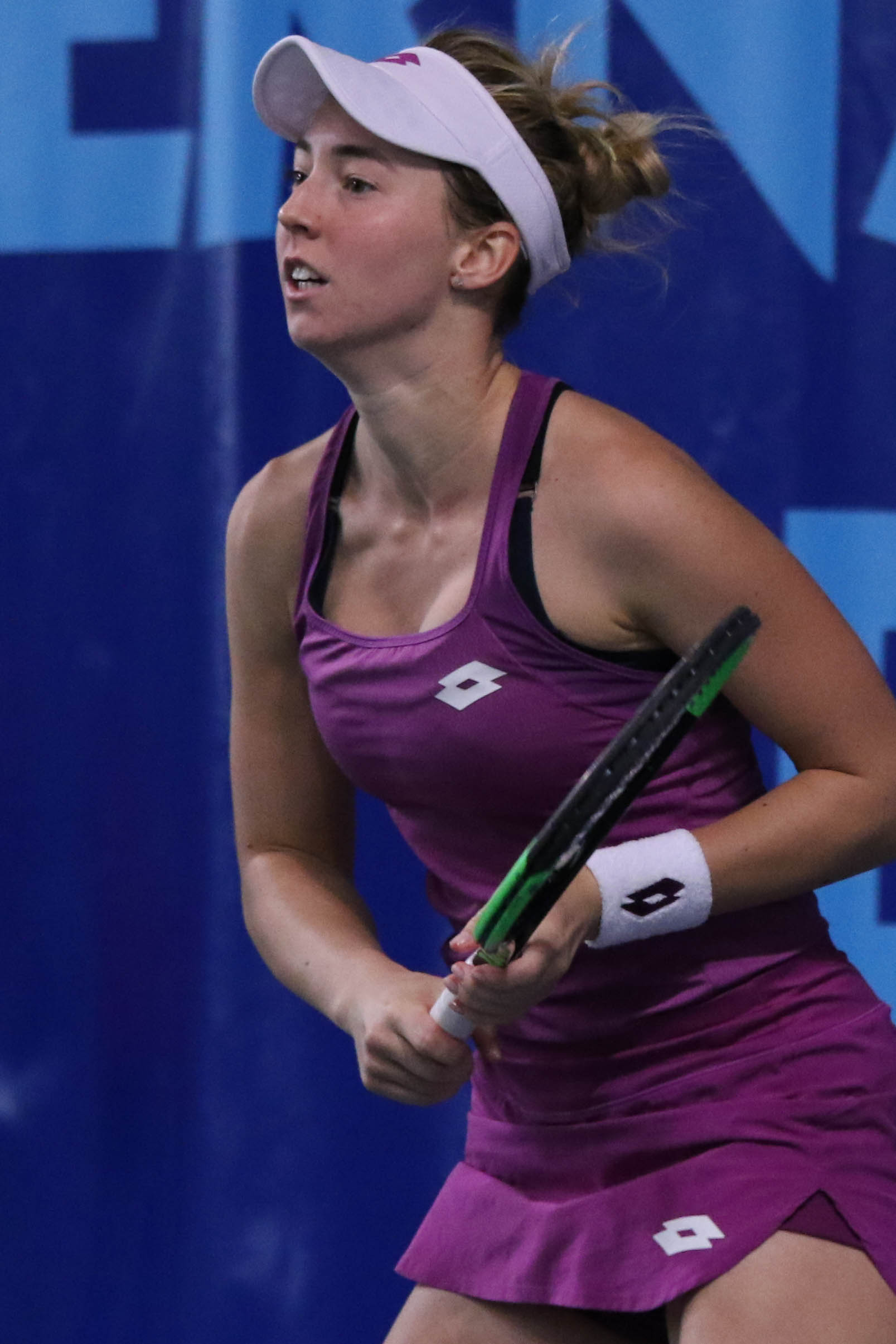
- Nina Stojanović in 2019
- Native name: Нина Стојановић
- Country (sports): Serbia
- Residence: Belgrade, Serbia
- Born: 30 July 1996 (age 30) Belgrade, Serbia, FR Yugoslavia
- Height: 1.76 m (5 ft 9 in)
- Turned pro: 2014
- Plays: Right-handed (two-handed backhand)
- Coach: Andoni Vivanco (2019–)
- Prize money: $1,542,829

Singles
- Career record: 272–180
- Career titles: 1 WTA 125
- Highest ranking: No. 81 (2 March 2020)

Grand Slam singles results
- Australian Open: 2R (2021)
- French Open: 1R (2020, 2021, 2025)
- Wimbledon: 1R (2021, 2025)
- US Open: 1R (2020, 2021)

Other tournaments
- Olympic Games: 2R (2021)

Doubles
- Career record: 243–117
- Career titles: 2 WTA, 1 WTA 125
- Highest ranking: No. 37 (17 January 2022)

Grand Slam doubles results
- Australian Open: SF (2021)
- French Open: 2R (2018, 2020)
- Wimbledon: QF (2021)
- US Open: 2R (2018, 2021)

Other doubles tournaments
- Olympic Games: 1R (2021)

Grand Slam mixed doubles results
- Australian Open: 1R (2022, 2025)

Other mixed doubles tournaments
- Olympic Games: SF – 4th (2021)

Team competitions
- Fed Cup: 11–12

Nina Stojanović (Serbian Cyrillic: Нина Стојановић, pronounced [stojǎːnoʋitɕ]; born 30 July 1996) is a Serbian inactive tennis player. On 2 March 2020, Stojanović reached a career-high singles ranking of world No. 81. On 17 January 2022, she peaked at No. 37 in the WTA doubles rankings.

She has won two doubles titles on the WTA Tour, as well as one WTA 125 title in singles and one in doubles. As a junior, Stojanović reached three major semifinals in doubles, each on a different surface, the French Open and Wimbledon in 2013, and the Australian Open in 2014. As a professional, she made her debut on the WTA Tour in 2016. In 2019, Stojanović reached her first WTA Tour semifinal in singles at the Jiangxi International and also won her first doubles title at the Baltic Open. That year, she also debuted in the top 100 in singles, while in doubles, she made her top-100 debut in 2017, when she reached three WTA Tour finals. Stojanović finished fourth in the mixed doubles at the delayed 2020 Tokyo Olympics.

== Juniors ==
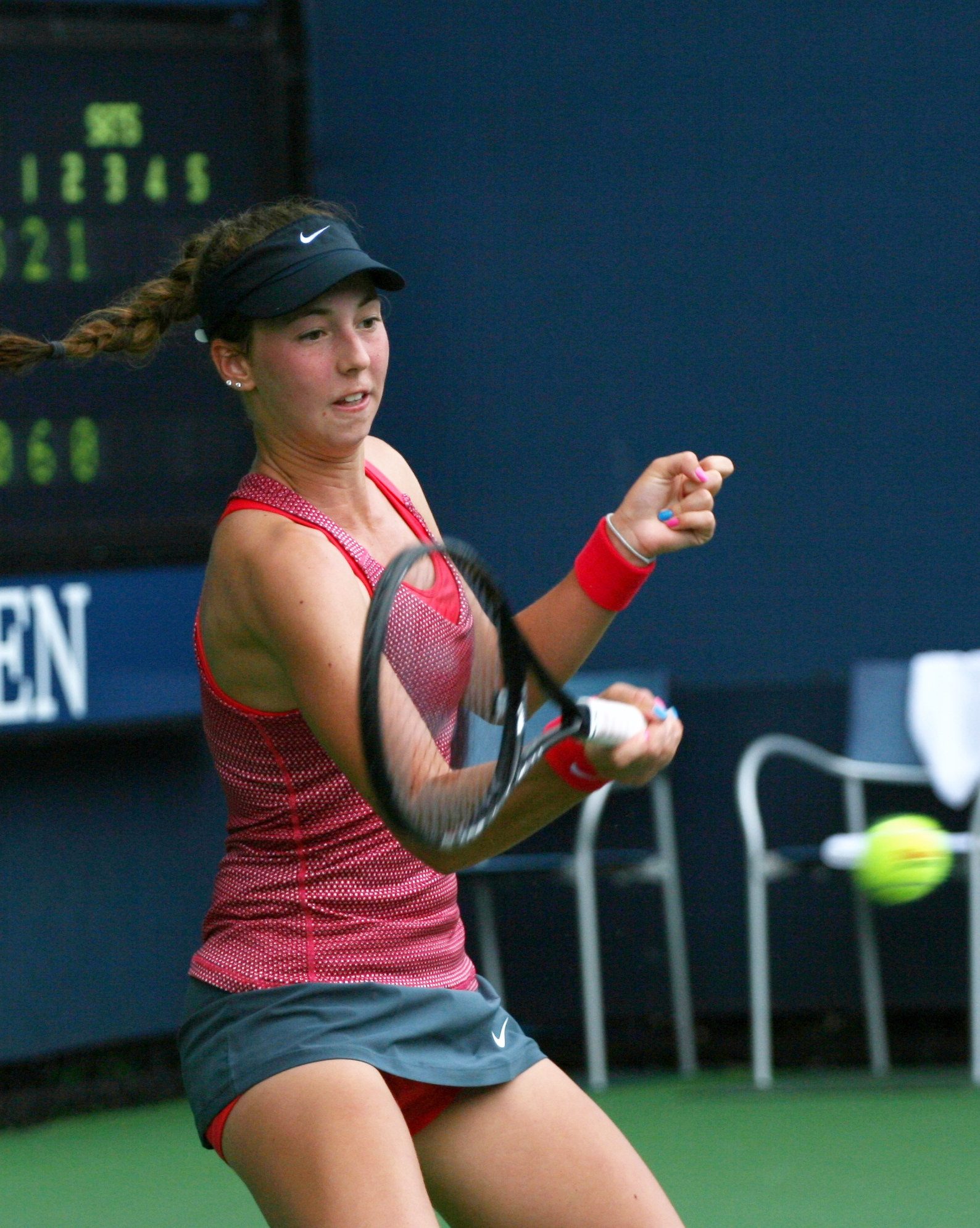
Stojanović at the 2013 US Open

Stojanovic is a former junior world No. 17 (achieved April 2013), she won three singles and ten doubles junior titles in total. She made her ITF Junior Circuit debut at the Grade-4 Malta U18 ITF Junior Tournament in March 2010 at the age of 13. In August 2010, she made her doubles debut at the Slovenian Junior Open. She played her last junior tournament at the European Summer Cups (girls) in August 2014.

In June 2011, she won her first ITF junior title at the Grade-5 Podgorica Open in singles, while in doubles she reached the final. After that, she won her first doubles title at the Grade-4 Carthago Cup. The following year she reached the final of the Grade-3 Ozerov Cup in Moscow, and won the title in doubles. In July 2012, she won Grade 1 Mediterranee Avenir in Casablanca in doubles. In November 2012, she reached quarterfinals of the Grade-1 Yucatan Cup, where she lost to Marcela Zacarías. In December 2012, she made her debut at the Orange Bowl, but lost in the first round in singles, and in the second round in doubles.

In January 2013, she won Grade-2 Slovak Junior Open, defeating Maria Marfutina in the final. There she also won the title in doubles. She followed this with the quarterfinal of the Grade-1 Czech International Junior Indoor Championships and the semifinal of the Grade-2 ITF Junior Circuit tournament in Monastir, Tunisia. She continued to progress, reaching the singles semifinals and winning the doubles title at the Grade-1 International Junior Championships, singles and doubles titles at the Grade-2 Open Ouest Provence in Istres and the singles final and doubles title at the Grade-1 Open International Junior de Beaulieu-sur-Mer. She then took part at the Trofeo Bonfiglio, where she reached the second round in singles and the first round in doubles. At the 2013 French Open, she made her major debut, but lost in the first round to Jamie Loeb. However, in doubles, she reached semifinals alongside Alice Matteucci. Same results in both singles and doubles, she made at the 2013 Wimbledon Championships. In August, she reached the final of the Grade-1 Canadian Open Junior Championships in doubles. At the 2013 US Open, she reached quarterfinals in doubles. In 2014, she won the Grade-1 AGL Loy Yang Traralgon Junior International and then entered the semifinals of the Australian Open, both in doubles.

== Professional ==
=== 2011–15: ITF Circuit ===
Stojanović made her ITF Women's Circuit debut at the $10k event in Pirot in October 2011. There, as a wildcard player, she lost to Lina Gjorcheska in the first round of the main draw. During the season of 2012, she take part of the two $10k events in Serbia, Palić and Pirot, but failed in the first rounds of both competitions. In September 2013, she won her first match at in Vrnjačka Banja and later reached quarterfinal. In December 2013, she made her ITF doubles debut at Sharm El Sheikh, and then in March 2014, she won her first ITF doubles in the same city. In May 2014, she won title in her first ITF singles final, defeating Katie Boulter in the final of Sharm El Sheikh. In December 2014, she won her first $25k-level title at the Navi Mumbai in both singles and doubles. During the season of 2015, she did not produce any significant results in singles, but reached two $50k semifinal in doubles, Wuhan and Xuzhou.

=== 2016: WTA Tour debut ===
In May 2016, she reached her first significant final at the $50k Tianjin event but lost to Aryna Sabalenka, in three sets. At the 2016 US Open, she had her first attempt to play in a major main draw, but lost in qualifying. In October 2016, she made her WTA Tour debut at the Tianjin Open but lost, after qualifying, in the first round to Magda Linette; so she did there in doubles. Nearly after that, she won her first major ITF title at the $50k Liuzhou Cup, defeating Jang Su-jeong in the final. She also had success in doubles when she reached semifinals of the $100k Kunming Open in May, and then won two $100k titles, in Shenzhen and Dubai.

=== 2017: Three career doubles finals, major and top 100 debuts ===
In January, Stojanović recorded her first WTA Tour main-draw wins as a qualifier at the Shenzhen Open, defeating fifth seed and world No. 28 Tímea Babos in the first round and Ons Jabeur in the second round, before losing to world No. 52 and eventual champion, Kateřina Siniaková, in the quarterfinals. Later, she reached the quarterfinal of the $60k Kültürpark Cup and semifinal of the $60k Suzhou Ladies Open. She failed to reach main-draw at the all four majors, losing in qualifyings.

More success came in doubles. That year, she reached three WTA Tour finals in doubles with three different partners, losing each time. First, she entered final of the Morocco Open in May with Maryna Zanevska, then at the Swiss Open in July with Viktorija Golubic and finally at the Tianjin Open in October with Dalila Jakupović. She also reached semifinals at the Hungarian Ladies Open, the Monterrey Open and Copa Colsanitas. At the French Open, she made her major main-draw debut, but lost in the first round. She entered the top 100 in doubles in May, for the first time.

=== 2018: Top 50 in doubles ===
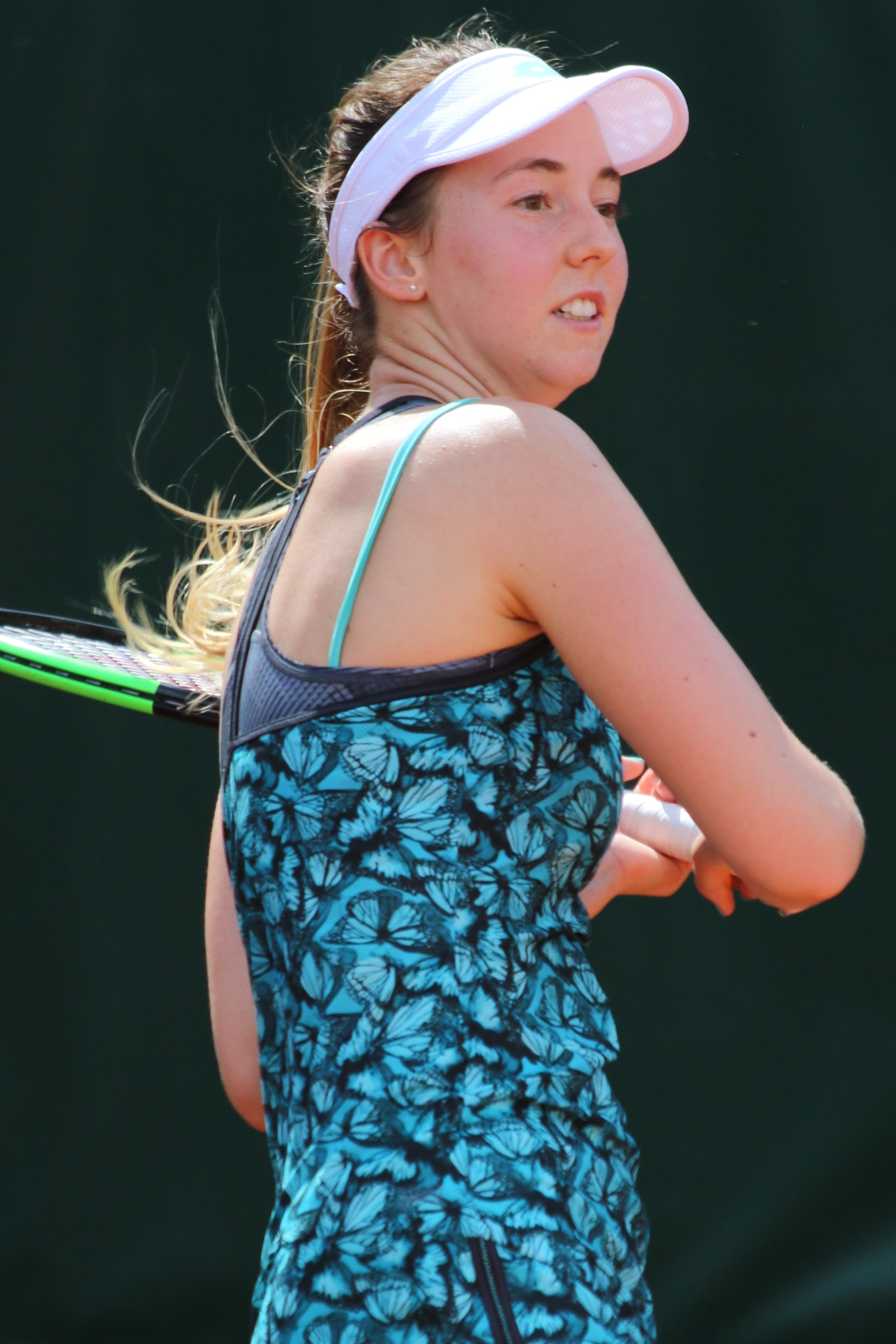
Stojanović at the 2018 French Open.

Stojanović performed better on the ITF Women's Circuit than on WTA Tour. In May, she reached quarterfinals of the $100k Khimki event, losing there to Vitalia Diatchenko. Soon after that, she won the $60k Baotou tournament, defeating Xu Shilin in the final. She did not drop a single set during the tournament. She followed this with the quarterfinal of the $60k Hódmezővásárhely Ladies Open, where she lost to Irina Khromacheva. In September, she reached another ITF quarterfinal, at the $60k Open de Valencia, where she lost to Paula Badosa. By the end of the year, she finished runner-up at two $25k events. In the late season, she got injured and was out of the tennis for some time.

In doubles, she reached the third round of the Australian Open alongside Viktorija Golubic. It was the first time that she reached third round of a major. At the Hungarian Ladies Open in February, she reached semifinals alongside Anastasiya Komardina. In July, she won the $80k Prague Open, partnering Cornelia Lister. In September, she won the $60k Open de Valencia alongside Irina Khromacheva. During the year, she also reached semifinals of the $60k Burnie International and $100k Khimki Cup, as well as finals of the $60k Hódmezővásárhely Open and $60k Reinert Open. In February, she debuted in the top 50 in doubles.

=== 2019: Top 100 in singles, WTA Tour title in doubles ===
After missing the first months of the season due to injury, Stojanović returned to court in April 2019 and as a qualifier reached her second WTA Tour quarterfinal in May at the Nuremberg Cup. She defeated fourth seed, last year finalist, and world No. 53 Alison Riske, and world No. 72, Sara Sorribes Tormo, before losing to Sorana Cîrstea. In July, she won the $60k Reinert Open in Versmond. Then she reached another WTA quarterfinal as a qualifier at the Baltic Open by defeating fourth seed and world No. 42, Aliaksandra Sasnovich, and fellow qualifier, Paula Ormaechea, before she was stopped by Bernarda Pera. She was even better in the doubles competition, winning her first WTA Tour title, partnering with Sharon Fichman. After failing to qualify for the US Open, she won the $60k Changsha Open, defeating Aleksandrina Naydenova in the final. The following week, she reached her first WTA singles semifinal at the Jiangxi Open by beating Wang Yafan, Samantha Stosur, and Kateryna Kozlova. In her semifinal match, she lost to the eventual champion, Rebecca Peterson. She continued her good performances, reaching quarterfinals of the Guangzhou Open, winning the $80k Internationaux de Poitiers tournament by defeating Liudmila Samsonova in straight sets and reaching quarterfinals of the $100k Shenzhen Open. In September, she debuted in the top 100 in singles.

=== 2020: Major debut in singles ===
Starting the year inside top 100, allowed her entering the main draw of the Australian Open. However, she lost to Anastasia Pavlyuchenkova in the first round. In doubles, she reached the third round, alongside Darija Jurak. She then competed at the $60k Andrézieux-Bouthéon Open, where she reached quarterfinals in singles and semifinals in doubles. After that, she lost in the first round of all singles tournaments, including the French Open and US Open. In doubles, she reached semifinals of the $60k Open de Cagnes-sur-Mer and $80k Macon Tennis Classic, and the second round of the French Open.

=== 2021: Australian Open semifinal in doubles ===
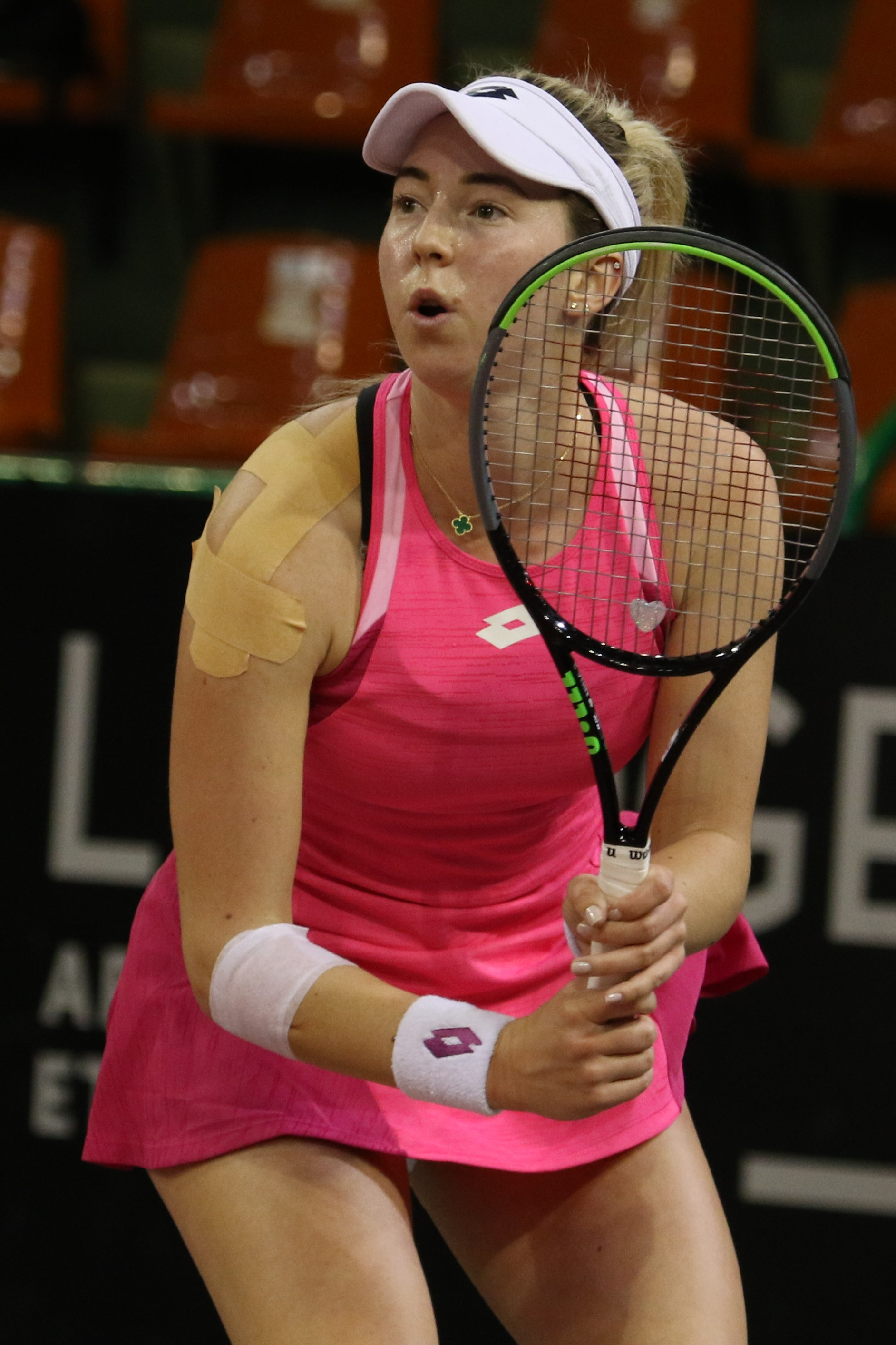
Stojanović at the 2021 Open de Limoges.

Stojanović won her first main-draw match in singles at a major when she defeated Irina-Camelia Begu in straight sets at the Australian Open, before losing to Serena Williams in the second round. Despite periodically having problems with injuries, she reached at least the second round in singles on eleven occasions, including third round as a qualifier at WTA 1000 Miami Open, when she had to forfeit the match to Naomi Osaka due to injury. She reached the semifinals at the Nottingham Open, losing to top seed and eventual champion, Johanna Konta, in three sets.

In doubles, Stojanović reached her first major semifinal at the Australian Open. She also partnered with compatriot Aleksandra Krunić to win her second career doubles title at the inaugural Serbia Open, as well as to reach the quarterfinals of Wimbledon. As a result, she reentered the top 50 in doubles. Stojanović finished the year with a career-high top 40 ranking in doubles.

=== 2022–2023: Injuries ===
Four separate injuries restricted Stojanović to playing in just five tournaments in 2022, while she missed the entire 2023 season.

=== 2024: First WTA 125 title ===
Partnering with Arantxa Rus, Stojanović was runner-up at the Hamburg Open, losing to Anna Bondár and Kimberley Zimmermann in the final which went to a deciding champions tiebreak.

She recorded her first WTA Tour-level singles wins in three and a half years (since Prague in 2021), at the Mérida Open in Mexico, defeating seventh seed Tatjana Maria and Marina Stakusic to reach the quarterfinals where her run was ended by Polina Kudermetova.

In November, Stojanović won her first WTA 125 singles title at the Copa Santiago defeating top seed Suzan Lamens, qualifier Oleksandra Oliynykova, sixth seed Darja Semeņistaja and eighth seed Sára Bejlek to reach the final, where she overcame second seed María Lourdes Carlé in three sets. Partnering Mayar Sherif, she also won the doubles title at the same tournament.

=== 2025: Two WTA 125 doubles finals ===
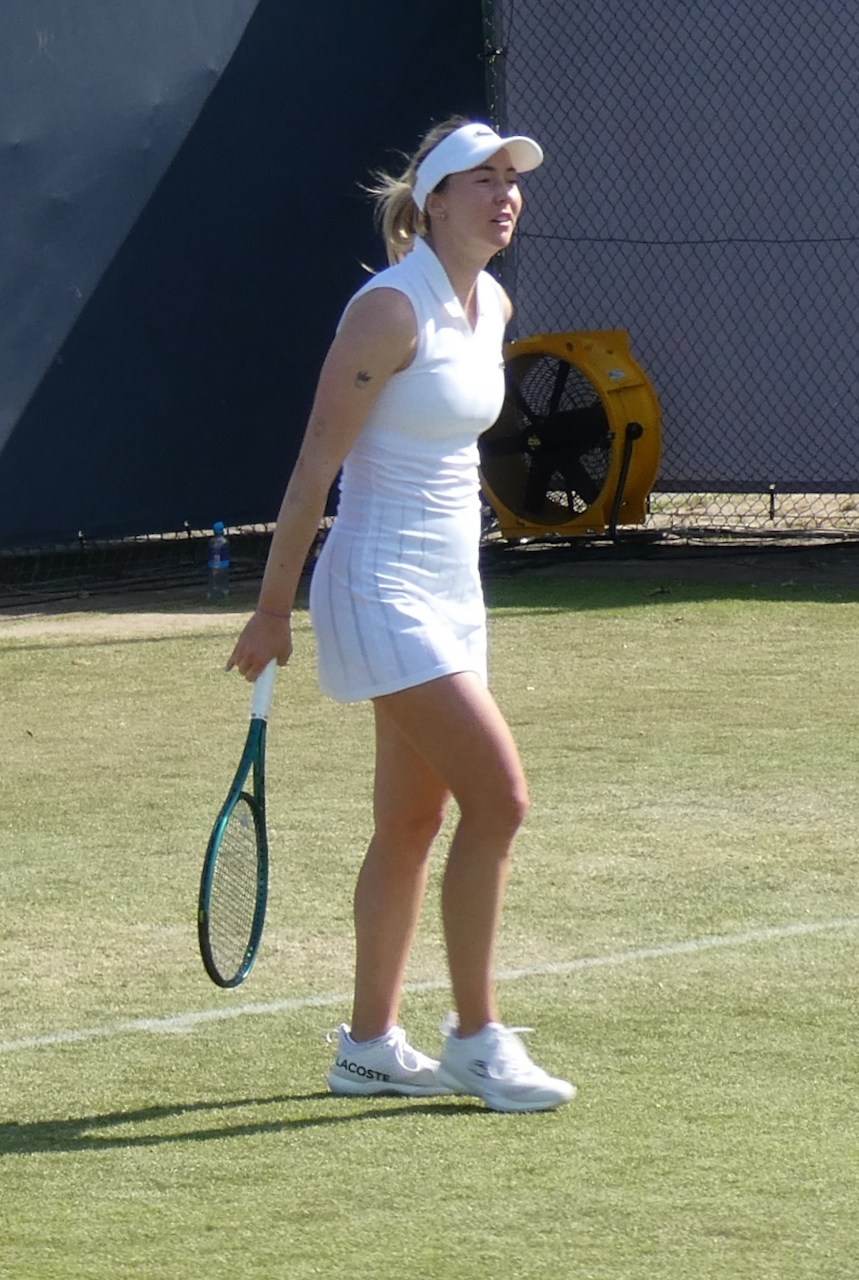
Stojanović at the 2025 Rosmalen Open

Partnering Darja Semeņistaja, Stojanović reached the doubles final at the Canberra International in January, losing to Jaimee Fourlis and Petra Hule in a deciding champions tiebreak.

In April, the pair were also runners-up at the Solgironès Open, losing the final to Magali Kempen and Anna Sisková in straight sets.

== National representation ==
Playing for the Serbia Fed Cup team, Stojanović has a win–loss record of 10–11. She made her debut in February 2014, partnering with Jovana Jakšić in their World Group II tie against Canada, when they defeated Gabriela Dabrowski and Sharon Fichman, in straight sets.

At the delayed 2020 Tokyo Olympics, she paired with world No. 1, Novak Djokovic, in the mixed doubles event, and the team reached the semifinals before losing to Elena Vesnina and Aslan Karatsev. Due to Djokovic's withdrawal from the bronze medal match, they finished the tournament in fourth place.

== Personal life ==
Stojanović has an aggressive style of play. The WTA profile says, her favourite surface is hardcourt, and her tennis idol growing up was Maria Sharapova.

== Performance timelines ==
Key
W	F	SF	QF	#R	RR	Q#	P#	DNQ	A	Z#	PO	G	S	B	NMS	NTI	P	NH

(W) winner; (F) finalist; (SF) semifinalist; (QF) quarterfinalist; (#R) rounds 4, 3, 2, 1; (RR) round-robin stage; (Q#) qualification round; (P#) preliminary round; (DNQ) did not qualify; (A) absent; (Z#) Davis/Fed Cup Zonal Group (with number indication) or (PO) play-off; (G) gold, (S) silver or (B) bronze Olympic/Paralympic medal; (NMS) not a Masters tournament; (NTI) not a Tier I tournament; (P) postponed; (NH) not held; (SR) strike rate (events won / competed); (W–L) win–loss record.
To avoid confusion and double counting, these charts are updated at the conclusion of a tournament or when the player's participation has ended.

Only main-draw results in WTA Tour, Grand Slam tournaments, Fed Cup/BJK Cup and Olympic Games are included in win–loss records.

=== Singles ===
Current through the 2024 Copa LP Chile.

Tournament	2016	2017	2018	2019	2020	2021	2022	2023	2024	2025	SR	W–L
Grand Slam tournaments
Australian Open	A	Q1	A	A	1R	2R	Q2	A	A	Q3	0 / 2	1–2
French Open	A	Q1	A	A	1R	1R	A	A	A	1R	0 / 3	0–3
Wimbledon	A	Q1	A	A	NH	1R	A	A	A	1R	0 / 2	0–2
US Open	Q1	Q1	Q1	Q3	1R	1R	A	A	Q1	A	0 / 2	0–2
Win–Loss	0–0	0–0	0–0	0–0	0–3	1–4	0–0	0–0	0–0	0–2	0 / 9	1–9
National representation
Summer Olympics	A	NH				2R	NH		A		0 / 1	1–1
WTA 1000
Indian Wells Open	A	A	A	A	NH	A	A	A	A	A	0 / 0	0–0
Miami Open	A	A	A	A	NH	3R	A	A	A	A	0 / 1	2–0
Madrid Open	A	A	A	A	NH	1R	A	A	A	A	0 / 1	0–1
Cincinnati Open	A	A	A	A	Q2	A	A	A	A	A	0 / 0	0–0
Career statistics
Tournaments	1	5	1	5	6	16	0	0	1		Career total: 35	
Overall win–loss	0–1	2–5	0–1	9–5	1–6	11–16	0–0	0–0	2–1		0 / 35	25–35
Year-end ranking	142	233	244	86	99	114	637	667	429	188	$1,542,829	

=== Doubles ===
Current through the 2024 WTA Tour.

Tournament	2016	2017	2018	2019	2020	2021	2022	2023	2024	SR	W–L	Win %
Grand Slam tournaments
Australian Open	A	A	3R	A	3R	SF	1R	A	A	0 / 4	8–4	67%
French Open	A	1R	2R	A	2R	1R	A	A	A	0 / 4	2–4	33%
Wimbledon	A	1R	A	A	NH	QF	A	A	A	0 / 2	2–2	50%
US Open	A	1R	2R	A	A	2R	A	A	1R	0 / 4	2–4	33%
Win–Loss	0–0	0–3	4–3	0–0	3–2	7–4	0–1	0–0	0–1	0 / 14	14–14	50%
National representation
Summer Olympics	A	NH				1R	NH		A	0 / 1	0–1	0%
WTA 1000
Indian Wells Open	A	A	1R	A	NH	A	A	A	A	0 / 1	0–1	0%
Miami Open	A	A	1R	A	NH	2R	A	A	A	0 / 2	1–2	33%
Career statistics
Tournaments	1	11	9	3	3	9	2	0	2	Career total: 40		
Titles	0	0	0	1	0	1	0	0	0	Career total: 2		
Finals	0	3	0	1	0	2	0	0	0	Career total: 6		
Overall win–loss	0–1	15–11	6–9	6–2	6–4	16–7	2–2	0–0	0–2	1 / 38	51–38	57%
Year-end ranking	166	57	72	118	85	40	495	779	312			

=== Mixed doubles ===
Tournament	2021	2022	SR	W–L
Grand Slam tournaments
Australian Open	A	1R	0 / 1	0–1
French Open	A	A	0 / 0	0–0
Wimbledon	A	A	0 / 0	0–0
US Open	A	A	0 / 0	0–0
Win–Loss	0–0	0–1	0 / 1	0–1
National representation
Summer Olympics	SF-4th (Note: Stojanović and Novak Djokovic withdraw before the match for bronze medal against Australians Ashleigh Barty and John Peers.)	NH	0 / 1	2–1

== Olympic medal matches ==
=== Mixed doubles: 1 (4th place) ===
Result	Year	Tournament	Surface	Partner	Opponents	Score
4th place	2021	2020 Tokyo Olympics	Hard	(Serbia) Novak Djokovic	(Australia) Ashleigh Barty (Australia) John Peers	w/o

== WTA Tour finals ==
=== Doubles: 6 (2 titles, 4 runner-ups) ===
Legend WTA 500 WTA 250 (2–4)	Finals by surface Hard (0–2) Clay (2–2)	Finals by setting Outdoor (2–4)

Result	W–L	Date	Tournament	Tier	Surface	Partner	Opponents	Score
Loss	0–1	May 2017	Rabat Grand Prix, Morocco	International	Clay	(Belgium) Maryna Zanevska	(Hungary) Tímea Babos (Czech Republic) Andrea Hlaváčková	6–2, 3–6, [5–10]
Loss	0–2	Jul 2017	Championship Gstaad, Switzerland	International	Clay	(Switzerland) Viktorija Golubic	(Netherlands) Kiki Bertens (Sweden) Johanna Larsson	6–7^{(4–7)}, 6–4, [7–10]
Loss	0–3	Oct 2017	Tianjin Open, China	International	Hard	(Slovenia) Dalila Jakupović	(Romania) Irina-Camelia Begu (Italy) Sara Errani	4–6, 3–6
Win	1–3	Jul 2019	Baltic Open, Latvia	International	Clay	(Canada) Sharon Fichman	(Latvia) Jeļena Ostapenko (Kazakhstan) Galina Voskoboeva	2–6, 7–6^{(7–1)}, [10–6]
Win	2–3	May 2021	Serbia Open, Serbia	WTA 250	Clay	(Serbia) Aleksandra Krunić	(Belgium) Greet Minnen (Belgium) Alison Van Uytvanck	6–0, 6–2
Loss	2–4	Jul 2021	Prague Open, Czech Republic	WTA 250	Hard	(Slovakia) Viktória Kužmová	(Czech Republic) Marie Bouzková (Czech Republic) Lucie Hradecká	6–7^{(4–7)}, 4–6

== WTA 125 finals ==
=== Singles: 1 (title) ===
Result	W–L	Date	Tournament	Surface	Opponent	Score
Win	1–0	Nov 2024	Copa Santiago, Chile	Clay	(Argentina) María Lourdes Carlé	3–6, 6–4, 6–4

=== Doubles: 5 (1 title, 4 runner-ups) ===
Result	W–L	Date	Tournament	Surface	Partner	Opponents	Score
Loss	0–1	Jul 2024	Polish Open, Poland	Hard	(Switzerland) Celine Naef	(Poland) Weronika Falkowska (Poland) Martyna Kubka	4–6, 6–7^{(5)}
Loss	0–2	Aug 2024	Hamburg Open, Germany	Clay	(Netherlands) Arantxa Rus	(Hungary) Anna Bondár (Belgium) Kimberley Zimmermann	7–5, 3–6, [9–11]
Win	1–2	Nov 2024	Copa Santiago, Chile	Clay	(Egypt) Mayar Sherif	(France) Léolia Jeanjean (France) Kristina Mladenovic	walkover
Loss	1–3	Jan 2025	Canberra International, Australia	Hard	(Latvia) Darja Semeņistaja	(Australia) Jaimee Fourlis (Australia) Petra Hule	5–7, 4–6, [5–10]
Loss	1–4	Apr 2025	Solgironès Open, Spain	Clay	(Latvia) Darja Semeņistaja	(Belgium) Magali Kempen (Czech Republic) Anna Sisková	6–7^{(1)}, 1–6

== ITF Circuit finals ==
=== Singles: 19 (11 titles, 8 runner-ups) ===
Legend $80,000 tournaments (1–0) $50/60,000 tournaments (4–1) $25/35,000 tournaments (4–4) $10,000 tournaments (2–3)	Finals by surface Hard (6–8) Clay (5–0)	Finals by setting Outdoor (9–7) Indoor (2–1)

Result	W–L	Date	Tournament	Tier	Surface	Opponent	Score
Win	1–0	May 2014	ITF Sharm El Sheikh, Egypt	10,000	Hard	(United Kingdom) Katie Boulter	3–6, 6–4, 6–3
Loss	1–1	May 2014	ITF Sharm El Sheikh, Egypt	10,000	Hard	(Russia) Polina Leykina	2–6, 6–2, 2–6
Loss	1–2	Nov 2014	ITF Sharm El Sheikh, Egypt	10,000	Hard	(Serbia) Vojislava Lukić	6–7^{(5)}, 7–6^{(3)}, 3–6
Win	2–2	Nov 2014	ITF Sharm El Sheikh, Egypt	10,000	Hard	(Russia) Anastasia Pribylova	7–6^{(9)}, 6–3
Win	3–2	Dec 2014	ITF Navi Mumbai, India	25,000	Hard	(Russia) Natela Dzalamidze	3–6, 6–1, 6–4
Loss	3–3	Feb 2015	ITF Cuernavaca, Mexico	25,000	Hard	(Mexico) Marcela Zacarías	3–6, 2–6
Loss	3–4	Sep 2015	ITF Antalya, Turkey	10,000	Hard	(France) Lou Brouleau	1–6, 1–6
Loss	3–5	Feb 2016	ITF New Delhi, India	25,000	Hard	(Uzbekistan) Sabina Sharipova	6–3, 2–6, 4–6
Loss	3–6	Apr 2016	ITF Qarshi, Uzbekistan	25,000	Hard	(Slovakia) Rebecca Šramková	1–6, 3–6
Loss	3–7	May 2016	ITF Tianjin, China	50,000	Hard	(Belarus) Aryna Sabalenka	7–5, 3–6, 1–6
Win	4–7	Jun 2016	ITF Braunschweig, Germany	25,000	Clay	(Georgia (country)) Ekaterine Gorgodze	6–4, 6–3
Win	5–7	Oct 2016	Liuzhou Open, China	50,000	Hard	(South Korea) Jang Su-jeong	6–3, 6–4
Win	6–7	May 2018	ITF Baotou, China	60,000	Clay (i)	(China) Xu Shilin	6–0, 6–4
Loss	6–8	Oct 2018	ITF Istanbul, Turkey	25,000	Hard (i)	(Romania) Raluca Șerban	2–6, 5–7
Win	7–8	Jul 2019	Reinert Open, Germany	W60	Clay	(Germany) Katharina Hobgarski	6–0, 7–5
Win	8–8	Sep 2019	Changsha Open, China	W60	Clay	(Bulgaria) Aleksandrina Naydenova	6–1, 6–1
Win	9–8	Oct 2019	Internationaux de Poitiers, France	W80	Hard (i)	(Russia) Liudmila Samsonova	6–2, 7–6^{(2)}
Win	10–8	Nov 2022	ITF Sharm El Sheikh, Egypt	W25	Hard	Tatiana Prozorova	7–6^{(10)}, 5–7, 6–1
Win	11–8	Jun 2024	ITF Kuršumlijska Banja, Serbia	W35	Clay	(United States) Vivian Wolff	6–2, 6–4

=== Doubles: 36 (26 titles, 10 runner-ups) ===
Legend $100,000 tournaments (3–2) $80,000 tournaments (1–0) $60,000 tournaments (5–2) $25,000 tournaments (8–5) $10/15,000 tournaments (9–1)	Finals by surface Hard (20–3) Clay (6–6) Carpet (0–1)	Finals by setting Outdoor (21–9) Indoor (5–1)

Result	W–L	Date	Tournament	Tier	Surface	Partner	Opponents	Score
Win	1–0	Mar 2014	ITF Sharm El Sheikh, Egypt	10k	Hard	(Montenegro) Ana Veselinović	(Bosnia and Herzegovina) Dea Herdželaš (India) Natasha Palha	6–0, 4–6, [10–6]
Win	2–0	May 2014	ITF Sharm El Sheikh, Egypt	10k	Hard	(United Kingdom) Katie Boulter	(China) Dong Xiaorong (Austria) Pia König	6–4, 6–2
Win	3–0	May 2014	ITF Sharm El Sheikh, Egypt	10k	Hard	(United Kingdom) Katie Boulter	(Kazakhstan) Ekaterina Klyueva (Russia) Sofia Smagina	6–2, 6–3
Win	4–0	May 2014	ITF Sharm El Sheikh, Egypt	10k	Hard	(Switzerland) Lisa Sabino	(United Kingdom) Lucy Brown (Russia) Polina Leykina	6–3, 4–6, [10–3]
Loss	4–1	Sep 2014	ITF Belgrade, Serbia	10k	Clay	(Croatia) Nina Alibalić	(Serbia) Natalija Kostić (Bulgaria) Isabella Shinikova	1–6, 2–6
Win	5–1	Sep 2014	ITF Vrnjačka Banja, Serbia	10k	Clay	(Bosnia and Herzegovina) Dea Herdželaš	(Russia) Daria Lodikova (Ukraine) Kateryna Sliusar	6–3, 6–0
Win	6–1	Oct 2014	ITF Oslo, Norway	10k	Hard (i)	(United States) Alexa Guarachi	(Ukraine) Maryna Kolb (Ukraine) Nadiya Kolb	6–4, 7–6^{(7)}
Win	7–1	Nov 2014	ITF Sharm El Sheikh, Egypt	10k	Hard	(Russia) Anna Morgina	(Russia) Alina Mikheeva (Czech Republic) Martina Přádová	5–7, 6–1, [10–3]
Win	8–1	Dec 2014	ITF Navi Mumbai, India	25k	Hard	(Greece) Despina Papamichail	(Japan) Miyabi Inoue (Japan) Miki Miyamura	7–6^{(5)}, 6–2
Win	9–1	Dec 2014	Pune Championships, India	25k	Hard	(Russia) Anna Morgina	(Georgia (country)) Oksana Kalashnikova (Ukraine) Anastasiya Vasylyeva	7–6^{(7)}, 6–4
Loss	9–2	Feb 2015	Rancho Santa Fe Open, US	25k	Hard	(Turkey) İpek Soylu	(United States) Samantha Crawford (United States) Asia Muhammad	0–6, 3–6
Win	10–2	Sep 2015	ITF Antalya, Turkey	10k	Hard	(Greece) Despina Papamichail	(Italy) Cristiana Ferrando (Switzerland) Chiara Grimm	1–6, 6–1, [10–5]
Win	11–2	Oct 2015	ITF Clermont-Ferrand, France	25k	Hard (i)	(Russia) Anastasiya Komardina	(Belgium) Elyne Boeykens (Netherlands) Eva Wacanno	6–2, 6–1
Win	12–2	Dec 2015	ITF Navi Mumbai, India	25k	Hard	(Russia) Anna Morgina	(Russia) Polina Leykina (China) Lu Jiajing	6–3, 7–5
Win	13–2	Feb 2016	ITF Moscow, Russia	25k	Hard (i)	(Russia) Anastasiya Komardina	(Russia) Polina Monova (Russia) Yana Sizikova	6–7^{(5)}, 6–1, [12–10]
Loss	13–3	Jun 2016	ITF Braunschweig, Germany	25k	Clay	(Bosnia and Herzegovina) Anita Husarić	(Germany) Katharina Gerlach (Germany) Katharina Hobgarski	4–6, 3–6
Win	14–3	Jun 2016	ITF Ystad, Sweden	25k	Clay	(Sweden) Cornelia Lister	(Bulgaria) Dia Evtimova (Austria) Pia König	6–4, 6–2
Loss	14–4	Sep 2016	Open de Biarritz, France	100k	Clay	(Sweden) Cornelia Lister	(Russia) Irina Khromacheva (Ukraine) Maryna Zanevska	6–4, 5–7, [8–10]
Win	15–4	Nov 2016	Shenzhen Longhua Open, China	100k	Hard	(China) You Xiaodi	(China) Han Xinyun (China) Zhu Lin	6–4, 7–6^{(6)}
Win	16–4	Dec 2016	Dubai Tennis Challenge, UAE	100k	Hard	(Luxembourg) Mandy Minella	(Chinese Taipei) Hsieh Su-wei (Russia) Valeria Savinykh	6–3, 3–6, [10–4]
Win	17–4	Jun 2017	Izmir Cup, Turkey	60k	Hard	(Belgium) An-Sophie Mestach	(Finland) Emma Laine (Japan) Kotomi Takahata	6–4, 7–5
Loss	17–5	Jul 2017	Budapest Pro Open, Hungary	100k	Clay	(Serbia) Aleksandra Krunić	(Colombia) Mariana Duque Mariño (Argentina) María Irigoyen	6–7^{(3)}, 5–7
Win	18–5	Oct 2017	Suzhou Ladies Open, China	60k	Hard	(United States) Jacqueline Cako	(Japan) Eri Hozumi (Japan) Miyu Kato	2–6, 7–5, [10–2]
Win	19–5	Nov 2017	Shenzhen Longhua Open, China (2)	100k	Hard	(United States) Jacqueline Cako	(Japan) Shuko Aoyama (China) Yang Zhaoxuan	6–4, 6–2
Loss	19–6	Apr 2018	ITF Óbidos, Portugal	25k	Carpet	(Belgium) An-Sophie Mestach	(United Kingdom) Sarah Beth Grey (United Kingdom) Olivia Nicholls	6–4, 6–7^{(4)}, [6–10]
Loss	19–7	Jun 2018	Hódmezővásárhely Ladies Open, Hungary	60k	Clay	(Montenegro) Danka Kovinić	(Hungary) Réka Luca Jani (Argentina) Nadia Podoroska	4–6, 4–6
Loss	19–8	Jul 2018	Reinert Open, Germany	60k	Clay	(Serbia) Olga Danilović	(Turkey) Pemra Özgen (Greece) Despina Papamichail	6–1, 2–6, [4–10]
Win	20–8	Jul 2018	Prague Open, Czech Republic	80k	Clay	(Sweden) Cornelia Lister	(Netherlands) Bibiane Schoofs (Belgium) Kimberley Zimmermann	6–2, 2–6, [10–8]
Win	21–8	Sep 2018	Open de Valencia, Spain	60k+H	Clay	(Russia) Irina Khromacheva	(Greece) Valentini Grammatikopoulou (Mexico) Renata Zarazúa	6–1, 6–4
Loss	21–9	Oct 2018	ITF Istanbul, Turkey	25k	Hard (i)	(Croatia) Tereza Mrdeža	(Russia) Ekaterina Kazionova (Russia) Polina Monova	3–6, 7–6^{(5)}, [6–10]
Win	22–9	Nov 2018	ITF Pétange, Luxembourg	25k	Hard (i)	(Russia) Anastasia Pribylova	(Poland) Katarzyna Piter (Slovakia) Chantal Škamlová	2–6, 6–2, [10–8]
Loss	22–10	May 2019	ITF Monzón, Spain	W25	Hard	(Greece) Despina Papamichail	(Croatia) Jana Fett (Hungary) Dalma Gálfi	6–7^{(2)}, 2–6
Win	23–10	Jun 2019	Macha Lake Open, Czech Republic	W60+H	Clay	(Russia) Natela Dzalamidze	(Japan) Kyōka Okamura (Serbia) Dejana Radanović	6–3, 6–3
Win	24–10	Nov 2022	ITF Sharm El Sheikh, Egypt	W25	Hard	(Netherlands) Arantxa Rus	(Belgium) Magali Kempen (China) Lu Jiajing	7–6^{(1)}, 6–2
Win	25–10	May 2024	ITF Kuršumlijska Banja, Serbia	W15	Clay	(Serbia) Natalija Senić	(Poland) Daria Kuczer (Belgium) Vicky Van de Peer	7–5, 7–5
Win	26–10	Mar 2025	ITF Târgu Mureș, Romania	W75	Hard (i)	(Italy) Camilla Rosatello	(United Kingdom) Madeleine Brooks (Lithuania) Justina Mikulskytė	7–6^{(1)}, 6–2

== Fed Cup/Billie Jean King Cup participation ==
Current after the 2020–21 Billie Jean King Cup.

Legend
World Group / Finals
World Group Play-off / Finals Qualif. Round
WG2 Round Robin (1–1)
WG2 Play-off / Finals Play-off (1–5)
Zone Group (9–6)

=== Singles (2–8) ===
Edition	Stage	Date	Location	Against	Surface	Opponent	W/L	Score
2017	Z1 R/R	Feb 2017	Tallinn (EST)	Estonia	Hard (i)	Anett Kontaveit	L	2–6, 5–7
2017	Z1 R/R	Feb 2017	Tallinn (EST)	Bulgaria	Hard (i)	Isabella Shinikova	W	6–2, 6–2
2017	Z1 R/R	Feb 2017	Tallinn (EST)	Israel	Hard (i)	Deniz Khazaniuk	L	4–6, 2–6
2017	Z1 P/O	Feb 2017	Tallinn (EST)	Poland	Hard (i)	Magda Linette	L	2–6, 1–6
2017	WG2 P/O	Apr 2017	Zrenjanin (SRB)	Australia	Hard (i)	Daria Gavrilova	L	0–6, 3–6
2020–21	Z1 R/R	Feb 2020	Esch-sur-Alzette (LUX)	Luxembourg	Hard (i)	Eleonora Molinaro	L	3–6, 3–6
2020–21	Z1 R/R	Feb 2020	Esch-sur-Alzette (LUX)	Sweden	Hard (i)	Johanna Larsson	L	1–6, 0–6
2020–21	Z1 P/O	Feb 2020	Esch-sur-Alzette (LUX)	Slovenia	Hard (i)	Tamara Zidanšek	W	6–4, 7–5
2020–21	F P/O	Apr 2021	Kraljevo (SRB)	Canada	Hard (i)	Rebecca Marino	L	4–6, 6–7^{(6)}
2020–21	F P/O	Apr 2021	Kraljevo (SRB)	Canada	Hard (i)	Leylah Fernandez	L	6–3, 3–6, 4–6

=== Doubles (9–4) ===
Edition	Stage	Date	Location	Against	Surface	Partner	Opponents	W/L	Score
2014	WG2 R/R	Feb 2014	Montreal (CAN)	Canada	Hard (i)	(Serbia) Jovana Jakšić	Gabriela Dabrowski; Sharon Fichman	W	2–6, 6–3, [10–8]
2014	WG2 P/O	Apr 2014	Bucharest (ROU)	Romania	Clay	(Serbia) Jovana Jakšić	Irina-Camelia Begu; Monica Niculescu	L	0–1 ret.
2016	WG2 R/R	Feb 2016	Kraljevo (SRB)	Spain	Hard (i)	(Serbia) Ivana Jorović	Lara Arruabarrena; Lourdes Domínguez Lino	L	6–4, 6–7^{(6)}, [7–10]
2016	WG2 P/O	Apr 2016	Belgrade (SRB)	Belgium	Clay (i)	(Serbia) Jovana Jakšić	Ysaline Bonaventure; An-Sophie Mestach	W	4–6, 6–0, [10–5]
2017	Z1 R/R	Feb 2017	Tallinn (EST)	Estonia	Hard (i)	(Serbia) Ivana Jorović	Anett Kontaveit; Maileen Nuudi	W	6–4, 1–6, 7–5
2017	Z1 R/R	Feb 2017	Tallinn (EST)	Israel	Hard (i)	(Serbia) Ivana Jorović	Deniz Khazaniuk; Maya Tahan	W	w/o
2017	Z1 P/O	Feb 2017	Tallinn (EST)	Poland	Hard (i)	(Serbia) Ivana Jorović	Magda Linette; Katarzyna Piter	W	4–6, 6–4, 6–1
2017	WG2 P/O	Apr 2017	Zrenjanin (SRB)	Australia	Hard (i)	(Serbia) Ivana Jorović	Ashleigh Barty; Casey Dellacqua	L	1–6, 5–7
2020–21	Z1 R/R	Feb 2020	Esch-sur-Alzette (LUX)	Luxembourg	Hard (i)	(Serbia) Aleksandra Krunić	Tiffany Cornelius; Eleonora Molinaro	W	6–4, 6–2
2020–21	Z1 R/R	Feb 2020	Esch-sur-Alzette (LUX)	Sweden	Hard (i)	(Serbia) Aleksandra Krunić	Johanna Larsson; Cornelia Lister	W	6–2, 6–1
2020–21	Z1 P/O	Feb 2020	Esch-sur-Alzette (LUX)	Slovenia	Hard (i)	(Serbia) Aleksandra Krunić	Tamara Zidanšek; Kaja Juvan	W	6–4, 6–4
2024	Z1 R/R	Apr 2024	Oeiras (POR)	Sweden	Clay	(Serbia) Lola Radivojević	Lea Nilsson; Nellie Taraba Wallberg	W	6–1, 7–5
2024	Z1 P/O	Apr 2024	Oeiras (POR)	Netherlands	Clay	(Serbia) Lola Radivojević	Suzan Lamens; Demi Schuurs	L	1–6, 4–6

== Notes ==
Preceded by Ivana Jorović	Serbian Tennis number one 30 September 2019 – 20 March 2022	Succeeded by Aleksandra Krunić
