= Isabella Shinikova =

Bulgarian tennis player (born 1991)

Isabella Shinikova Изабелла Шиникова
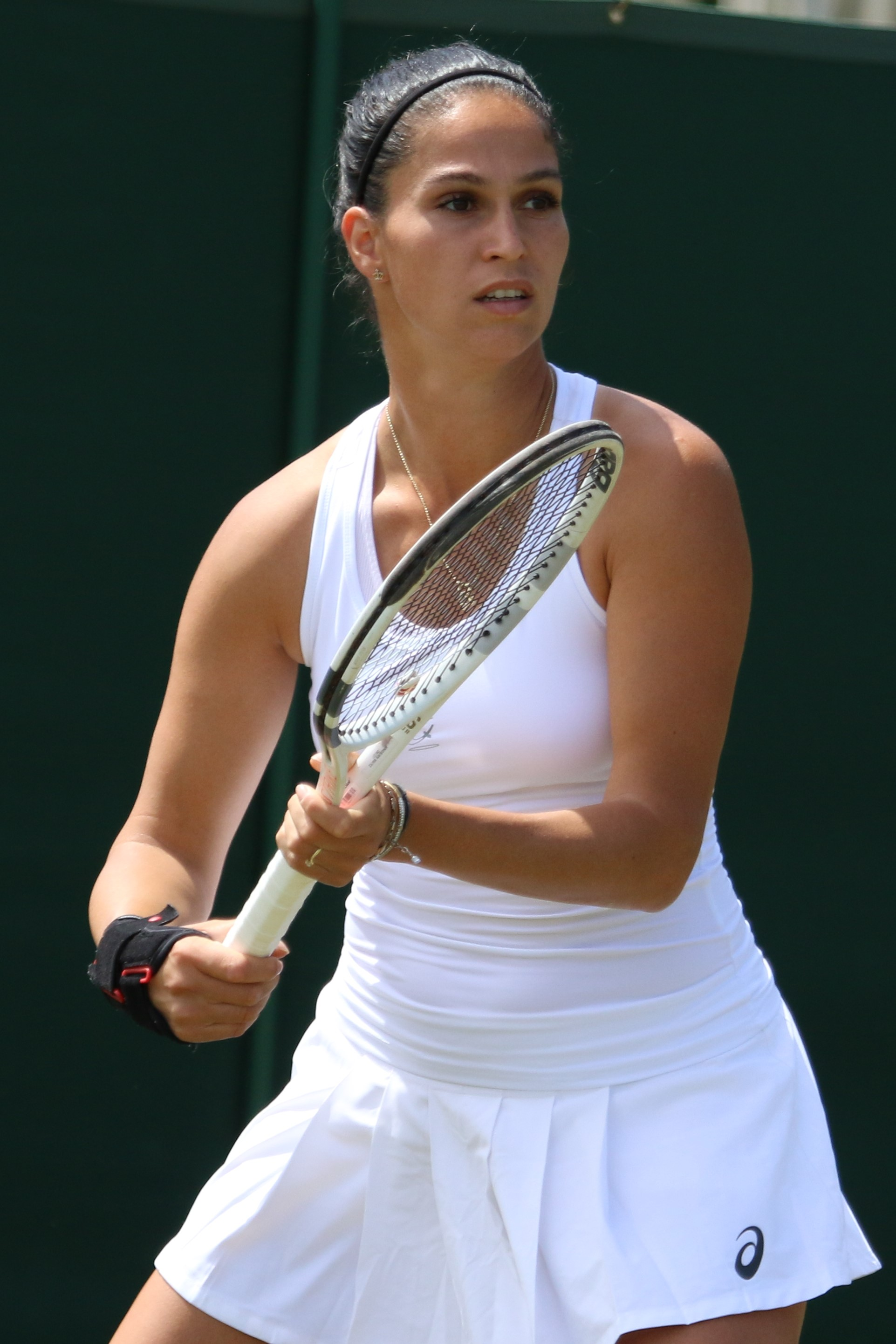
- Shinikova at the 2022 Wimbledon Championships
- Country (sports): Bulgaria
- Residence: Sofia, Bulgaria
- Born: 25 October 1991 (age 35) Sofia
- Height: 1.84 m (6 ft 0 in)
- Turned pro: 2009
- Plays: Right-handed (two-handed backhand)
- Prize money: $744,684

Singles
- Career record: 652–454
- Career titles: 27 ITF
- Highest ranking: No. 133 (20 February 2017)
- Current ranking: No. 406 (16 November 2026)

Grand Slam singles results
- Australian Open: Q2 (2020, 2021)
- French Open: Q2 (2022)
- Wimbledon: Q2 (2019, 2021, 2022)
- US Open: Q3 (2019)

Doubles
- Career record: 439–360
- Career titles: 32 ITF
- Highest ranking: No. 159 (20 May 2019)
- Current ranking: No. 327 (16 November 2026)

Team competitions
- Fed Cup: 20–25
- Last updated on: 20 November 2026.

Isabella Shinikova (Bulgarian: Изабелла Шиникова) (born 25 October 1991) is a Bulgarian tennis player.

On 20 February 2017, she reached a career-high singles ranking of world No. 133. On 20 May 2019, she peaked at No. 159 in the WTA doubles rankings. She also plays for the Bulgaria Billie Jean King Cup team, with a win–loss record of 20–25 as of November 2026.

== Career ==
=== Juniors ===
Shinikova started playing tennis at the age seven. She played on the ITF Junior Circuit in 2006 and won two singles titles and one doubles title.

=== 2009–15: Professional debut, success on the ITF Circuit ===
In 2009, Shinikova made her pro debut at a $25k event. Since then, she has been playing on the ITF Women's Circuit, and in 2015, she topped the annual leaderboard winning eight titles through the year.

=== 2016–17: WTA Tour, major & top 150 debuts ===
In April 2016, Shinikova made her main-draw debut at a WTA Tour tournament at the Katowice Open, losing to Alizé Cornet in the first round. Then, she failed to qualify for the main draws of Stuttgart Open, Rosmalen Open and Birmingham Classic. In July 2016, Shinikova qualified for the main draw of the Bucharest Open, losing to Simona Halep, in the second round.

She made her major debut in 2016 in the qualifying draws of the Wimbledon and at the US Open, where seeded 31st, she lost to Laura Robson in the second round. In 2017, she made also her debut in the qualifying draw at the other two Grand Slam events. She reached a career-high ranking of No. 133 on 20 February 2017, following the Australian Open.

=== 2019–22: Progress at Grand Slam tournaments ===
She reached second round at the 2019 Wimbledon Championships, the third round of qualifying at the 2019 US Open, her best showing at a major thus far, and the second round of qualifying at the 2020 Australian Open.

=== 2023: United Cup debut ===
On 23 November 2022, she was confirmed as a participant on the 2023 United Cup as part of the Bulgarian team. She won her doubles match, partnering Alexander Lazarov, and the tie against Belgium represented by former doubles No. 1, Elise Mertens, and her partner David Goffin.

== Grand Slam performance timeline ==
Key
W	F	SF	QF	#R	RR	Q#	P#	DNQ	A	Z#	PO	G	S	B	NMS	NTI	P	NH

(W) winner; (F) finalist; (SF) semifinalist; (QF) quarterfinalist; (#R) rounds 4, 3, 2, 1; (RR) round-robin stage; (Q#) qualification round; (P#) preliminary round; (DNQ) did not qualify; (A) absent; (Z#) Davis/Fed Cup Zonal Group (with number indication) or (PO) play-off; (G) gold, (S) silver or (B) bronze Olympic/Paralympic medal; (NMS) not a Masters tournament; (NTI) not a Tier I tournament; (P) postponed; (NH) not held; (SR) strike rate (events won / competed); (W–L) win–loss record.
To avoid confusion and double counting, these charts are updated at the conclusion of a tournament or when the player's participation has ended.

=== Singles ===
Tournament	2016	2017	2018	2019	2020	2021	2022	2023	2024	W–L
Australian Open	A	Q1	A	A	Q2	Q2	A	A	A	0–0
French Open	A	Q1	A	A	Q1	Q1	Q2	A	A	0–0
Wimbledon	Q1	Q1	A	Q2	NH	Q2	Q2	A	A	0–0
US Open	Q2	A	A	Q3	A	Q1	Q1	A	A	0–0
Win–Loss	0–0	0–0	0–0	0–0	0–0	0–0	0–0	0–0	0–0	0–0

== ITF Circuit finals ==
=== Singles: 51 (27 titles, 24 runner-ups) ===
Legend W60/75 tournaments W40 tournaments W25 tournaments W10/15 tournaments	Finals by surface Hard (15–9) Clay (12–15)

Result	W–L	Date	Tournament	Tier	Surface	Opponent	Score
Loss	0–1	Oct 2010	ITF Dobrich, Bulgaria	10k	Clay	(Montenegro) Danka Kovinić	4–6, 3–6
Loss	0–2	Apr 2011	ITF Antalya, Turkey	10k	Clay	(Georgia (country)) Ekaterine Gorgodze	1–6, 3–6
Loss	0–3	Apr 2011	ITF Antalya, Turkey	10k	Hard	(Netherlands) Quirine Lemoine	4–6, 2–6
Loss	0–4	Jun 2011	ITF Madrid, Spain	10k	Clay	(Switzerland) Lisa Sabino	5–7, 3–6
Win	1–4	Mar 2012	ITF Amiens, France	10k	Clay (i)	(Belgium) Ysaline Bonaventure	6–3, 0–6, 6–3
Loss	1–5	Mar 2012	ITF La Marsa, Tunisia	25k	Clay	(Ukraine) Elina Svitolina	6–7^{(4)}, 6–7^{(5)}
Loss	1–6	Dec 2012	ITF Antalya, Turkey	10k	Clay	(France) Irina Ramialison	1–6, 6–2, 0–6
Win	2–6	Dec 2012	ITF Istanbul, Turkey	10k	Hard (i)	(Turkey) İpek Soylu	6–4, 6–2
Loss	2–7	Jun 2013	ITF Adana, Turkey	10k	Hard	(Slovakia) Zuzana Zlochová	5–7, 0–6
Loss	2–8	Jun 2013	ITF Breda, Netherlands	10k	Clay	(United States) Bernarda Pera	4–6, 6–4, 0–6
Loss	2–9	Mar 2014	ITF Bron, France	10k	Hard (i)	(Croatia) Ema Mikulčić	0–6, 5–7
Win	3–9	May 2014	ITF Caserta, Italy	10k	Clay	(Ukraine) Marianna Zakarlyuk	4–6, 6–3, 6–4
Win	4–9	Jan 2015	ITF El Kantaoui, Tunisia	10k	Hard	(Egypt) Sandra Samir	6–2, 3–6, 6–3
Win	5–9	Feb 2015	ITF El Kantaoui, Tunisia	10k	Hard	(Belgium) Marie Benoît	6–2, 5–7, 6–1
Loss	5–10	Mar 2015	ITF El Kantaoui, Tunisia	10k	Hard	(France) Myrtille Georges	4–6, 0–6
Win	6–10	Jul 2015	ITF Bursa, Turkey	10k	Clay	(Argentina) Julieta Lara Estable	6–3, 6–4
Win	7–10	Sep 2015	ITF Varna, Bulgaria	10k	Clay	(Romania) Irina Bara	7–6^{(2)}, 6–4
Win	8–10	Oct 2015	ITF Sozopol, Bulgaria	10k	Hard	(France) Margot Yerolymos	6–3, 3–0 ret.
Win	9–10	Nov 2015	ITF El Kantaoui, Tunisia	10k	Hard	(Tunisia) Chiraz Bechri	6–1, 6–2
Win	10–10	Dec 2015	ITF El Kantaoui, Tunisia	10k	Hard	(Russia) Yana Sizikova	6–3, 6–2
Win	11–10	Dec 2015	ITF El Kantaoui, Tunisia	10k	Hard	(Russia) Marta Paigina	7–5, 6–1
Loss	11–11	Dec 2015	ITF El Kantaoui, Tunisia	10k	Hard	(Russia) Marta Paigina	2–6, 3–6
Win	12–11	Feb 2016	ITF Beinasco, Italy	25k	Clay (i)	(Italy) Jessica Pieri	1–6, 6–2, 6–2
Win	13–11	Mar 2016	ITF Hammamet, Tunisia	10k	Clay	(Austria) Julia Grabher	6–4, 6–4
Win	14–11	Mar 2016	ITF Hammamet, Tunisia	10k	Clay	(Romania) Irina Bara	6–1, 4–6, 7–6^{(2)}
Win	15–11	May 2016	Chiasso Open, Switzerland	25k	Clay	(United Kingdom) Amanda Carreras	6–3, 7–6^{(1)}
Win	16–11	May 2016	ITF Caserta, Italy	25k	Clay	(Slovenia) Dalila Jakupović	6–2, 4–6, 6–2
Win	17–11	Jul 2016	Bella Cup, Poland	25k	Clay	(Slovenia) Tadeja Majerič	7–5, 4–6, 6–2
Loss	17–12	Sep 2016	ITF Dobrich, Bulgaria	25k	Clay	(Liechtenstein) Kathinka von Deichmann	0–6, 3–6
Win	18–12	Nov 2016	ITF Stockholm, Sweden	10k	Hard (i)	(Slovakia) Kristína Schmiedlová	6–2, 6–4
Loss	18–13	Oct 2017	ITF Hammamet, Tunisia	15k	Clay	(France) Marie Témin	4–6, 0–6
Win	19–13	Oct 2017	ITF Hammamet, Tunisia	15k	Clay	(Japan) Satsuki Takamura	6–1, 6–2
Loss	19–14	Oct 2017	ITF Hammamet, Tunisia	15k	Clay	(Oman) Fatma Al-Nabhani	3–6, 1–6
Loss	19–15	Mar 2018	ITF Palmanova, Spain	15k	Clay	(Switzerland) Ylena In-Albon	1–6, 5–7
Loss	19–16	Mar 2018	ITF Hammamet, Tunisia	15k	Clay	(Croatia) Lea Bošković	7–6^{(7)}, 3–6, 4–6
Loss	19–17	Mar 2018	ITF Hammamet, Tunisia	15k	Clay	(Paraguay) Montserrat González	6–7^{(4)}, 2–6
Win	20–17	Apr 2018	ITF Hammamet, Tunisia	15k	Clay	(Spain) Yvonne Cavallé Reimers	6–3, 7–5
Loss	20–18	Jun 2018	ITF Klosters, Switzerland	W25	Clay	(Czech Republic) Miriam Kolodziejová	7–5, 4–6, 1–6
Loss	20–19	Jul 2018	ITF Båstad, Sweden	W25	Clay	(United States) Allie Kiick	2–6, 1–6
Win	21–19	Feb 2019	Trnava Indoor, Slovakia	W25	Hard (i)	(Czech Republic) Denisa Šátralová	6–1, 6–3
Win	22–19	Sep 2019	Oeste Ladies Open, Portugal	W60	Hard	(Serbia) Natalija Kostić	6–3, 2–0 ret.
Loss	22–20	Oct 2021	ITF Lagos, Portugal	W25	Hard	(Croatia) Antonia Ružić	1–6, 4–6
Win	23–20	Apr 2023	ITF Monastir, Tunisia	W15	Hard	(Australia) Lisa Mays	3–6, 6–4, 6–1
Win	24–20	Jul 2023	ITF Porto, Portugal	W40	Hard	(France) Kristina Mladenovic	6–4, 7–5
Loss	24–21	Aug 2023	Vrnjačka Banja Open, Serbia	W25	Clay	(Slovenia) Polona Hercog	2–6, 4–6
Win	25–21	Feb 2025	ITF Sharm El Sheikh, Egypt	W15	Hard	(Czech Republic) Jana Kovačková	3–6, 6–0, 7–6^{(7)}
Win	26–21	Feb 2025	ITF Sharm El Sheikh, Egypt	W15	Hard	(China) Zhu Chenting	6–4, 3–6, 6–3
Win	27–21	Mar 2025	ITF Sharm El Sheikh, Egypt	W15	Hard	(Georgia (country)) Sofia Shapatava	6–1, 6–2
Loss	27–22	Feb 2026	ITF Sharm El Sheikh, Egypt	W15	Hard	(China) Ren Yufei	7–6^{(2)}, 5–7, 0–6
Loss	27–23	Apr 2026	ITF Sharm El Sheikh, Egypt	W15	Hard	(Slovakia) Katarína Kužmová	1–6, 6–3, 5–7
Loss	27–24	Aug 2026	ITF Ourense, Spain	W75	Hard	(Kazakhstan) Sonja Zhiyenbayeva	6–7^{(2)}, 6–3, 1–6

=== Doubles: 69 (32 titles, 37 runner-ups) ===
Legend W60/75 tournaments W40/50 tournaments W25/35 tournaments W10/15 tournaments	Finals by surface Hard (14–13) Clay (18–24)

Result	W–L	Date	Tournament	Tier	Surface	Partner	Opponents	Score
Loss	0–1	Jul 2010	ITF Prokuplje, Serbia	10k	Clay	(Slovenia) Jelena Durišič	(Romania) Camelia Hristea (Romania) Ionela-Andreea Iova	5–7, 4–6
Win	1–1	Aug 2010	ITF Istanbul, Turkey	10k	Hard	(Turkey) Başak Eraydın	(Oman) Fatma Al-Nabhani (Portugal) Magali de Lattre	3–6, 6–3, [10–4]
Win	2–1	Jan 2011	GB Pro-Series Glasgow, UK	10k	Hard (i)	(Norway) Ulrikke Eikeri	(Serbia) Teodora Mirčić (Croatia) Jasmina Tinjić	6–4, 6–4
Loss	2–2	Mar 2011	ITF Antalya, Turkey	10k	Clay	(Bulgaria) Martina Gledacheva	(Belarus) Ilona Kremen (Netherlands) Demi Schuurs	6–3, 6–7^{(3)}, [8–10]
Loss	2–3	Jun 2011	ITF Madrid, Spain	10k	Hard	(Bulgaria) Julia Stamatova	(Spain) Rocío de la Torre-Sánchez (Spain) Olga Sáez Larra	4–6, 6–4, [8–10]
Loss	2–4	Jun 2011	ITF Alkmaar, Netherlands	10k	Clay	(Malta) Kimberley Cassar	(Poland) Olga Brózda (Poland) Natalia Kołat	7–6^{(6)}, 2–6, [2–10]
Loss	2–5	Jul 2011	ITF Prokuplje, Serbia	10k	Clay	(Bulgaria) Julia Stamatova	(Slovenia) Polona Reberšak (Hungary) Zsófia Susányi	4–6, 6–7^{(2)}
Win	3–5	Aug 2011	ITF Istanbul, Turkey	10k	Hard	(France) Irina Ramialison	(Ukraine) Khristina Kazimova (Germany) Christina Shakovets	3–6, 6–1, [10–8]
Loss	3–6	Aug 2011	ITF Istanbul, Turkey	10k	Hard	(Georgia (country)) Sofia Kvatsabaia	(Portugal) Magali de Lattre (United Kingdom) Lisa Whybourn	3–6, 6–2, [10–12]
Loss	3–7	Mar 2012	ITF Bron, France	10k	Hard (i)	(Germany) Justine Ozga	(Latvia) Diāna Marcinkēviča (Greece) Despina Papamichail	5–7, 5–7
Win	4–7	Mar 2012	ITF La Marsa, Tunisia	25k	Clay	(Norway) Ulrikke Eikeri	(Bosnia and Herzegovina) Mervana Jugić-Salkić (Austria) Sandra Klemenschits	6–3, 6–4
Win	5–7	Apr 2012	ITF Vic, Spain	10k	Clay	(Russia) Eugeniya Pashkova	(United Kingdom) Amanda Carreras (Mexico) Ximena Hermoso	6–1, 6–2
Loss	5–8	Jun 2012	ITF Lenzerheide, Switzerland	25k	Clay	(Russia) Ksenia Lykina	(Serbia) Aleksandra Krunić (Croatia) Ana Vrljić	2–6, 4–6
Win	6–8	Jul 2012	ITF Breda, Italy	10k	Clay	(Belgium) Ysaline Bonaventure	(Germany) Carolin Daniels (Switzerland) Xenia Knoll	6–4, 7–6^{(5)}
Loss	6–9	Jul 2012	ITF Denain, France	25k	Clay	(Slovakia) Michaela Hončová	(France) Myrtille Georges (France) Céline Ghesquière	4–6, 2–6
Loss	6–10	Feb 2013	ITF Antalya, Turkey	10k	Clay	(Spain) Eva Fernández Brugués	(South Korea) Han Na-lae (South Korea) Lee Jin-a	3–6, 3–6
Win	7–10	Mar 2013	ITF Amiens, France	10k	Clay (i)	(Germany) Lena-Marie Hofmann	(Netherlands) Bernice van de Velde (Netherlands) Kelly Versteeg	7–6^{(5)}, 6–1
Win	8–10	Mar 2013	ITF Le Havre, France	10k	Clay (i)	(France) Estelle Cascino	(Germany) Dejana Raickovic (Germany) Laura Schaeder	0–6, 7–5, [10–5]
Win	9–10	Aug 2013	ITF Braunschweig, Germany	15k	Clay	(France) Clothilde de Bernardi	(Czech Republic) Tereza Maliková (Czech Republic) Tereza Smitková	3–6, 6–1, [10–8]
Loss	9–11	Sep 2013	ITF Dobrich, Bulgaria	25k	Clay	(Bulgaria) Dalia Zafirova	(Switzerland) Xenia Knoll (Serbia) Teodora Mirčić	5–7, 6–7^{(5)}
Win	10–11	Feb 2014	ITF Bron, France	10k	Hard (i)	(Ukraine) Alyona Sotnikova	(Germany) Anna Klasen (Philippines) Katharina Lehnert	5–7, 7–6^{(5)}, [10–5]
Win	11–11	Mar 2014	ITF Amiens, France	10k	Clay (i)	(Ukraine) Alyona Sotnikova	(Italy) Angelica Moratelli (Italy) Anna-Giulia Remondina	6–1, 6–4
Win	12–11	Mar 2014	ITF Le Havre, France	10k	Clay (i)	(Ukraine) Alyona Sotnikova	(Netherlands) Bernice van de Velde (Netherlands) Kelly Versteeg	6–4, 6–3
Win	13–11	Apr 2014	ITF Dijon, France	15k	Hard (i)	(Hungary) Réka Luca Jani	(Czech Republic) Martina Borecká (Netherlands) Michaëlla Krajicek	6–3, 7–5
Loss	13–12	Aug 2014	ITF Innsbruck, Austria	10k	Clay	(Bulgaria) Julia Stamatova	(Poland) Zuzanna Maciejewska (Italy) Camilla Rosatello	2–6, 2–6
Loss	13–13	Aug 2014	ITF Braunschweig, Germany	15k	Clay	(Russia) Polina Leykina	(Switzerland) Conny Perrin (South Africa) Chanel Simmonds	3–6, 0–6
Win	14–13	Sep 2014	ITF Belgrade, Serbia	10k	Clay	(Serbia) Natalija Kostić	(Croatia) Nina Alibalić (Serbia) Nina Stojanović	6–1, 6–2
Loss	14–14	Sep 2014	ITF Dobrich, Bulgaria	25k	Clay	(Hungary) Réka Luca Jani	(Romania) Andreea Mitu (Romania) Irina Bara	5–7, 6–7^{(5)}
Win	15–14	Sep 2014	ITF Varna, Bulgaria	10k	Clay	(Bulgaria) Julia Terziyska	(Romania) Diana Buzean (Romania) Raluca Elena Platon	7–5, 6–1
Loss	15–15	Oct 2014	ITF Albena, Bulgaria	10k	Clay	(Moldova) Iulia Helbet	(Czech Republic) Lenka Kunčíková (Czech Republic) Karolína Stuchlá	2–6, 4–6
Win	16–15	Jan 2015	ITF El Kantaoui, Tunisia	10k	Hard	(France) Estelle Cascino	(Czech Republic) Kristýna Hrabalová (Czech Republic) Vendula Žovincová	7–6^{(3)}, 6–0
Win	17–15	Jan 2015	ITF El Kantaoui, Tunisia	10k	Hard	(Slovakia) Chantal Škamlová	(Croatia) Silvia Njirić (Spain) Olga Parres Azcoitia	6–2, 6–0
Win	18–15	Feb 2015	ITF Mâcon, France	10k	Hard (i)	(Netherlands) Eva Wacanno	(France) Kinnie Laisné (France) Marine Partaud	6–4, 3–6, [10–5]
Win	19–15	Mar 2015	ITF El Kantaoui, Tunisia	10k	Hard	(France) Myrtille Georges	(South Africa) Chanel Simmonds (Belgium) Magali Kempen	1–6, 6–4, [10–2]
Loss	19–16	Mar 2015	ITF El Kantaoui, Tunisia	10k	Hard	(Oman) Fatma Al-Nabhani	(Germany) Carolin Daniels (Poland) Justyna Jegiołka	5–7, 7–5, [5–10]
Win	20–16	Jul 2015	ITF Bursa, Turkey	10k	Clay	(Bulgaria) Dia Evtimova	(Argentina) Ailen Crespo Azconzábal (Argentina) Ana Victoria Gobbi	6–2, 3–6, [10–7]
Win	21–16	Sep 2015	ITF Varna, Bulgaria	10k	Clay	(Romania) Irina Bara	(Argentina) Julieta Lara Estable (Argentina) Ana Victoria Gobbi	7–5, 4–6, [10–4]
Win	22–16	Oct 2015	ITF Sozopol, Bulgaria	10k	Hard	(Bulgaria) Julia Terziyska	(Germany) Anna Klasen (Germany) Charlotte Klasen	6–1, 6–2
Win	23–16	Dec 2015	ITF El Kantaoui, Tunisia	10k	Hard	(Switzerland) Karin Kennel	(Belarus) Darya Chernetsova (Russia) Yana Sizikova	4–6, 6–3, [10–7]
Loss	23–17	Dec 2015	ITF El Kantaoui, Tunisia	10k	Hard	(United Kingdom) Francesca Stephenson	(Belarus) Darya Chernetsova (Moldova) Alexandra Perper	4–6, 6–4, [7–10]
Win	24–17	Mar 2016	ITF El Hammamet, Tunisia	10k	Clay	(Austria) Julia Grabher	(Russia) Yuliya Kalabina (Russia) Polina Monova	7–5, 6–0
Loss	24–18	Mar 2016	ITF Hammamet, Tunisia	10k	Clay	(North Macedonia) Lina Gjorcheska	(Austria) Julia Grabher (Hungary) Naomi Totka	5–7, 6–1, [11–13]
Win	25–18	Sep 2016	ITF Dobrich, Bulgaria	25k	Clay	(North Macedonia) Lina Gjorcheska	(Germany) Laura Schaeder (Norway) Melanie Stokke	6–7^{(13)}, 6–2, [10–6]
Loss	25–19	Mar 2017	ITF Hammamet, Tunisia	15k	Clay	(Russia) Margarita Lazareva	(Slovakia) Sandra Jamrichová (Russia) Yulia Kulikova	5–7, 6–7^{(5)}
Win	26–19	Mar 2017	ITF Hammamet, Tunisia	15k	Clay	(Slovakia) Chantal Škamlová	(Russia) Margarita Lazareva (Russia) Maria Marfutina	7–6^{(5)}, 4–6, [10–8]
Loss	26–20	Jul 2017	ITF Horb, Germany	25k	Clay	(Hungary) Ágnes Bukta	(Netherlands) Lesley Kerkhove (Netherlands) Bibiane Schoofs	5–7, 3–6
Loss	26–21	Aug 2017	Montreux Ladies Open, Switzerland	25k	Clay	(Slovakia) Michaela Hončová	(Switzerland) Xenia Knoll (Switzerland) Amra Sadiković	2–6, 5–7
Loss	26–22	Oct 2017	ITF Hammamet, Tunisia	15k	Clay	(Croatia) Mariana Dražić	(Croatia) Lea Bošković (France) Yasmine Mansouri	6–1, 4–6, [6–10]
Loss	26–23	Dec 2017	ITF Hammamet, Tunisia	15k	Clay	(France) Victoria Muntean	(Italy) Claudia Giovine (Italy) Giorgia Marchetti	3–6, 1–6
Loss	26–24	Mar 2018	ITF Hammamet, Tunisia	15k	Clay	(Italy) Camilla Scala	(Paraguay) Montserrat González (Brazil) Laura Pigossi	2–6, 0–6
Win	27–24	Jul 2018	ITF Aschaffenburg, Germany	25k	Clay	(Russia) Polina Leykina	(United States) Chiara Scholl (Finland) Emma Laine	7–6^{(4)}, 7–5
Loss	27–25	Jul 2018	ITF Baja, Hungary	25k	Clay	(Romania) Nicoleta Dascălu	(Serbia) Natalija Kostić (Argentina) Paula Ormaechea	w/o
Win	28–25	Sep 2018	ITF Clermont-Ferrand, France	25k	Hard (i)	(Switzerland) Leonie Küng	(France) Manon Arcangioli (France) Shérazad Reix	6–2, 7–5
Loss	28–26	Jun 2019	ITF Klosters, Switzerland	W25	Clay	(Switzerland) Leonie Küng	(Switzerland) Lisa Sabino (Italy) Gaia Sanesi	6–3, 1–6, [6–10]
Loss	28–27	Aug 2019	Kozerki Open, Poland	W25	Clay	(Norway) Ulrikke Eikeri	(Poland) Anna Hertel (Ukraine) Anastasiya Shoshyna	7–6^{(6)}, 2–6, [4–10]
Win	29–27	Sep 2019	Oeste Ladies Open, Portugal	W60	Hard	(France) Jessika Ponchet	(Kazakhstan) Anna Danilina (Germany) Vivian Heisen	6–1, 6–3
Win	30–27	Jun 2021	Grado Tennis Cup, Italy	W25	Clay	(Italy) Lucia Bronzetti	(Italy) Federica di Sarra (Italy) Camilla Rosatello	6–4, 2–6, [10–8]
Win	31–27	Jun 2022	Brașov Open, Romania	W60	Clay	(Czech Republic) Jesika Malečková	(Slovenia) Veronika Erjavec (Poland) Weronika Falkowska	7–6^{(5)}, 6–3
Win	32–27	Mar 2023	ITF Monastir, Tunisia	W15	Hard	(Switzerland) Naïma Karamoko	(Chile) Fernanda Labraña (Serbia) Elena Milovanović	6–4, 3–6, [10–5]
Loss	32–28	Jun 2023	ITF La Marsa, Tunisia	W25	Hard	(China) Wei Sijia	Anastasia Gasanova; Ekaterina Yashina	5–7, 7–6^{(1)}, [9–11]
Loss	32–29	Jan 2024	ITF Sharm El Sheikh, Egypt	W35	Hard	(Czech Republic) Linda Klimovičová	Daria Khomutsianskaya; Evialina Laskevich	4–6, 2–6
Loss	32–30	Mar 2024	ITF Monastir, Tunisia	W15	Hard	(Serbia) Elena Milovanović	Evialina Laskevich (Slovakia) Radka Zelníčková	0–6, 1–6
Loss	32–31	Oct 2024	ITF Kayseri, Turkey	W50	Hard	(Turkey) Melis Sezer	(Romania) Briana Szabó (Romania) Patricia Maria Țig	6–3, 4–6, [8–10]
Loss	32–32	Mar 2025	ITF Sharm El Sheikh, Egypt	W15	Hard	(Romania) Elena-Teodora Cadar	(United States) Carolyn Ansari (Poland) Zuzanna Pawlikowska	4–6, 0–6
Loss	32–33	Jul 2025	Open Araba en Femenino, Spain	W75	Hard	(France) Nahia Berecoechea	(Norway) Malene Helgø (China) Shi Han	3–6, 3–6
Loss	32–34	Aug 2025	ITF Leipzig, Germany	W50	Clay	(Germany) Lola Giza	(South Korea) Park So-hyun (Thailand) Peangtarn Plipuech	1–6, 4–6
Loss	32–35	Nov 2025	ITF Monastir, Tunisia	W35	Hard	(Italy) Anastasia Abbagnato	(United States) Kailey Evans (United States) Jordyn McBride	3–6, 2–6
Loss	32–36	Aug 2026	ITF Oldenzaal, Netherlands	W50	Clay	(Netherlands) Lian Tran	(Germany) Tayisiya Morderger (Germany) Yana Morderger	3–6, 3–6
Loss	32–37	Oct 2026	ITF Sharm El Sheikh, Egypt	W15	Hard	(Croatia) Karla Popović	(Egypt) Lamis Alhussein Abdel Aziz (Egypt) Sandra Samir	1–6, 6–7^{(4)}

== National participation ==
=== Fed Cup/Billie Jean King Cup ===
Shinikova debuted for the Bulgaria Fed Cup team in 2012. Since then, she has a 10–13 singles record and a 10–13 doubles record (20–26 overall).

==== Singles (10–13) ====
Edition	Round	Date	Location	Against	Surface	Opponent	W/L	Result
2012	Z1 PO	4 Feb 2012	Eilat (ISR)	Portugal	Hard	Maria João Koehler	L	3–6, 5–7
2014	Z1 RR	4 Feb 2014	Budapest (HUN)	Portugal	Hard (i)	Maria João Koehler	L	6–3, 1–6, 4–6
2014	Z1 RR	6 Feb 2014	Budapest (HUN)	Turkey	Hard (i)	Pemra Özgen	W	6–2, 3–6, 6–4
2014	Z1 PO	9 Feb 2014	Budapest (HUN)	Luxembourg	Hard (i)	Claudine Schaul	W	6–2, 6–3
2016	Z1 PO	6 Feb 2016	Eilat (ISR)	Georgia	Hard	Sofia Shapatava	W	1–6, 7–6^{(7–1)}, 6–4
2017	Z1 RR	9 Feb 2017	Tallinn (EST)	Serbia	Hard (i)	Nina Stojanović	L	2–6, 2–6
2017	Z1 RR	10 Feb 2017	Tallinn (EST)	Estonia	Hard (i)	Maria Lota Kaul	W	7–5, 7–5
2018	Z1 RR	7 Feb 2018	Tallinn (EST)	Serbia	Hard (i)	Olga Danilović	L	3–6, 7–6^{(7–3)}, 6–7^{(6–8)}
2018	Z1 RR	8 Feb 2018	Tallinn (EST)	(Georgia (country)) Georgia	Hard (i)	Sofia Shapatava	W	6–3, 6–3
2018	Z1 PO	10 Feb 2018	Tallinn (EST)	Poland	Hard (i)	Magdalena Fręch	L	5–7, 3–6
2019	Z1 RR	6 Feb 2019	Zielona Góra (POL)	Estonia	Hard (i)	Valeria Gorlats	W	7–6^{(8–6)}, 6–3
2019	Z1 RR	7 Feb 2019	Zielona Góra (POL)	Ukraine	Hard (i)	Marta Kostyuk	L	5–7, 4–6
2019	Z1 RR	8 Feb 2019	Zielona Góra (POL)	Sweden	Hard (i)	Mirjam Björklund	L	3–6, 2–6
2020–21	Z1 RR	5 Feb 2020	Tallinn (EST)	Croatia	Hard (i)	Lea Bošković	L	6–2, 4–6, 4–6
2020–21	Z1 RR	6 Feb 2020	Tallinn (EST)	Ukraine	Hard (i)	Dayana Yastremska	L	2–6, 1–6
2020–21	Z1 PO	8 Feb 2020	Tallinn (EST)	Greece	Hard (i)	Valentini Grammatikopoulou	W	6–3, 6–1
2022	Z1 RR	11 Apr 2022	Antalya (TUR)	Austria	Clay	Julia Grabher	L	2–6, 3–6
2022	Z1 RR	12 Apr 2022	Antalya (TUR)	Croatia	Clay	Petra Martić	L	3–6, 1–6
2022	Z1 RR	13 Apr 2022	Antalya (TUR)	Sweden	Clay	Jacqueline Cabaj Awad	W	6–0, 3–6, 7–5
2022	Z1 RR	14 Apr 2022	Antalya (TUR)	Slovenia	Clay	Pia Lovrič	L	4–6, 4–6
2023	Z1 RR	10 Apr 2023	Antalya (TUR)	Serbia	Clay	Lola Radivojević	L	6–3, 3–6, 2–6
2023	Z1 PO	15 Apr 2023	Antalya (TUR)	Turkey	Clay	Çağla Büyükakçay	W	6–3, 1–6, 6–1
2024	Z1 RR	10 Apr 2024	Oeiras (POR)	Austria	Clay	Tamara Kostic	W	6–2, 6–4

==== Doubles (10–13) ====
Edition	Round	Date	Location	Partner	Surface	Against	Opponents	W/L	Result
2013	Z1 RR	7 Feb 2013	Eilat (ISR)	Elitsa Kostova	Hard	Netherlands	Arantxa Rus; Bibiane Schoofs	W	6–2, 7–6^{(7–5)}
2013	Z1 RR	8 Feb 2013	Eilat (ISR)	Dia Evtimova	Hard	Luxembourg	Laura Correia; Tiffany Cornelius	W	6–2, 6–2
2013	Z1 RR	9 Feb 2013	Eilat (ISR)	Elitsa Kostova	Hard	Slovenia	Andreja Klepač; Tina Rupert	W	6–2, 6–3
2014	Z1 RR	4 Feb 2014	Budapest (HUN)	Viktoriya Tomova	Hard (i)	Portugal	Bárbara Luz; Ines Murta	W	6–2, 7–5
2014	Z1 RR	6 Feb 2014	Budapest (HUN)	Elitsa Kostova	Hard (i)	Turkey	Çağla Büyükakçay; Pemra Özgen	L	7–5, 1–6, 5–7
2016	Z1 RR	3 Feb 2016	Eilat (ISR)	Dia Evtimova	Hard	Hungary	Dalma Gálfi; Fanny Stollár	L	3–6, 1–6
2016	Z1 RR	4 Feb 2016	Eilat (ISR)	Dia Evtimova	Hard	Latvia	Diāna Marcinkeviča; Jeļena Ostapenko	L	6–4, 0–6, 5–7
2016	Z1 RR	5 Feb 2016	Eilat (ISR)	Dia Evtimova	Hard	Belgium	Marie Benoît; An-Sophie Mestach	L	7–6^{(7–4)}, 2–6, 4–6
2016	Z1 PO	6 Feb 2016	Eilat (ISR)	Elitsa Kostova	Hard	Georgia	Oksana Kalashnikova; Sofia Shapatava	L	2–6, 6–4, 4–6
2017	Z1 RR	10 Feb 2017	Tallinn (EST)	Sesil Karatantcheva	Hard (i)	Estonia	Anett Kontaveit; Maileen Nuudi	L	3–6, 5–7
2019	Z1 RR	6 Feb 2019	Zielona Góra (POL)	Viktoriya Tomova	Hard (i)	Estonia	Anett Kontaveit; Maileen Nuudi	W	6–2, 6–2
2019	Z1 RR	7 Feb 2019	Zielona Góra (POL)	Viktoriya Tomova	Hard (i)	Ukraine	Nadiia Kichenok; Marta Kostyuk	L	0–6, 6–7^{(0–7)}
2020–21	Z1 RR	5 Feb 2020	Tallinn (EST)	Viktoriya Tomova	Hard (i)	Croatia	Jana Fett; Darija Jurak	L	2–6, 6–3, 1–6
2022	Z1 RR	11 Apr 2022	Antalya (TUR)	Julia Terziyska	Clay	Austria	Barbara Haas; Sinja Kraus	W	6–7^{(6–8)}, 6–2, 6–4
2022	Z1 RR	14 Apr 2022	Antalya (TUR)	Julia Terziyska	Clay	Slovenia	Živa Falkner; Lara Smejkal	W	6–0, 5–7, 6–1
2023	Z1 RR	11 Apr 2023	Antalya (TUR)	Julia Terziyska	Clay	Croatia	Lucija Ćirić Bagarić; Antonia Ružić	W	7–6^{(7–4)}, 4–6, 6–3
2023	Z1 RR	12 Apr 2023	Antalya (TUR)	Julia Terziyska	Clay	Sweden	Jacqueline Cabaj Awad; Caijsa Hennemann	L	6–7^{(6–8)}, 6–4, 5–7
2024	Z1 RR	8 Apr 2024	Oeiras (POR)	Lia Karatancheva	Clay	Hungary	Adrienn Nagy; Natália Szabanin	L	4–6, 3–6
2024	Z1 RR	9 Apr 2024	Oeiras (POR)	Lia Karatancheva	Clay	Denmark	Laura Brunkel; Rebecca Munk Mortensen	W	6–4, 6–4
2024	Z1 PO	13 Apr 2024	Oeiras (POR)	Lia Karatancheva	Clay	Portugal	Francisca Jorge; Matilde Jorge	L	3–6, 6–4, [2–10]
2025	Z2 RR	8 Apr 2025	Larnaca (CYP)	Rositsa Dencheva	Hard	Israel	Mika Buchnik; Alian Zack	W	6–0, 6–2
2025	Z2 RR	9 Apr 2025	Larnaca (CYP)	Lia Karatancheva	Hard	Egypt	Gana Hossam Salah; Amira Mohamed Badwy	L	1–1, ret.
2025	Z2 PO	10 Apr 2025	Larnaca (CYP)	Lia Karatancheva	Hard	Norway	Malene Helgø; Ulrikke Eikeri	L	5–7, 5–7

=== United Cup ===
==== Singles (0–2) ====
Edition	Round	Date	Location	Against	Surface	Opponent	W/L	Result
2023	RR	29 Dec 2022	Perth (AUS)	Greece	Hard	Despina Papamichail	L	6–3, 4–6, 1–6
2023	RR	31 Dec 2022	Perth (AUS)	Belgium	Hard	Alison Van Uytvanck	L	1–6, 6–3, 3–6

==== Doubles (1–0) ====
Edition	Round	Date	Location	Partner	Surface	Against	Opponents	W/L	Result
2023	RR	1 Jan 2023	Perth (AUS)	Alexandar Lazarov	Hard	Belgium	Elise Mertens; David Goffin	W	1–6, 7–6^{(7–5)}, [10–6]
