= Baltic Open =

Tennis tournament held in Latvia

Tournament information
- Event name: Baltic Open
- Tour: WTA International
- Founded: 2019
- Location: Jūrmala, Latvia
- Surface: Clay (red) - outdoors

The Baltic Open was a WTA Tour International-level professional women's tennis tournament. It took place on outdoor clay courts, in July 2019, at the National Tennis Center Lielupe in Jūrmala, Latvia. It had replaced the Moscow River Cup.

The prize money was $250,000. The main draw included 32 players in the singles' tournament and 16 teams in the doubles' tournament. Additionally, 18 other players participated in the qualifiers for the main tournament.

In 2021, the Baltic Open license was transferred to Hamburg European Open.

== Results ==
=== Singles ===
Year	Champion	Runner-up	Score
2019	(Latvia) Anastasija Sevastova	(Poland) Katarzyna Kawa	3–6, 7–5, 6–4

=== Doubles ===
Year	Champions	Runners-up	Score
2019	(Canada) Sharon Fichman (Serbia) Nina Stojanović	(Latvia) Jeļena Ostapenko (Kazakhstan) Galina Voskoboeva	2–6, 7–6^{(7–1)}, [10–6]
