= Maya Tahan =

Israeli tennis player (born 1999)

- Native name: מאיה טחן
- Country (sports): Israel
- Born: 9 January 1999 (age 27) Tel Mond, Israel
- Plays: Right-handed (two-handed backhand)
- College: University of Miami
- Prize money: $28,073

Singles
- Career record: 77–66
- Career titles: 2 ITF
- Highest ranking: No. 578 (16 September 2019)

Doubles
- Career record: 85–44
- Career titles: 10 ITF
- Highest ranking: No. 456 (7 October 2019)

Team competitions
- Fed Cup: 2–5

Maya Tahan (Hebrew: מאיה טחן; born 9 January 1999) is an Israeli former tennis player. She has been ranked as high as No. 578 in singles by the Women's Tennis Association (WTA) in September 2019. Her career-high WTA doubles ranking is 456 which she achieved October 2019.

== Early life and education ==
Tahan is from Tel Mond, Israel, to a family of Sephardic Jewish descent. Her parents are Gil and Merav Tahan. Her father is a colonel in the Israel Defense Forces (IDF), and her mother is a financial officer. She has an older sister, Roni, and two younger sisters, Dana and Shira.

=== Tennis career ===
Tahan began playing tennis at the age of eight and moved to train at the Netanya Tennis Club when she was 11 years old. She attended Rabin High School. She served in the Israel Defense Forces for two years. In December 2017, she won the Israel national doubles championship title partnering with Vlada Ekshibarova.

Tahan won two $15k singles tournaments in 2018, and $10k doubles events, and won a $25k doubles tournament in August 2019.

She played collegiate tennis for the Miami Hurricanes at the University of Miami in 2019–20, but had her spring season cut short by the COVID-19 pandemic in the United States. She recorded 7–4 in singles, and 2–6 in doubles.

Tahan also has represented Israel in Fed Cup in 2016, 2017, and 2019, and has a win–loss record of 2–5.

== ITF Circuit finals ==
=== Singles (2–0) ===
$100,000 tournaments
$80,000 tournaments
$60,000 tournaments
$25,000 tournaments
$15,000 tournaments

| Result | W–L | Date | Tournament | Tier | Surface | Opponent | Score |
|---|---|---|---|---|---|---|---|
| Win | 1–0 | Jun 2018 | ITF Kiryat Shmona, Israel | 15,000 | Hard | (Israel) Nicole Nadel | 7–6^{(7–3)}, 7–5 |
| Win | 2–0 | Oct 2018 | ITF Ashkelon, Israel | 15,000 | Hard | (Russia) Anna Pribylova | 6–4, 6–3 |

=== Doubles (10–5) ===
| $100,000 tournaments $80,000 tournaments $60,000 tournaments $25,000 tournaments $15,000 tournaments $10,000 tournaments | Finals by surface Hard (8–3) Clay (2–2) Grass (0–0) Carpet (0–0) |

| Result | No. | Date | Tournament | Surface | Partner | Opponents | Score |
|---|---|---|---|---|---|---|---|
| Runner-up | 1. | 4 September 2015 | ITF Kiryat Gat, Israel | Hard | (Israel) May Kimhi | (United Kingdom) Francesca Stephenson (Montenegro) Ana Veselinović | 6–3, 7–5 |
| Winner | 1. | 8 October 2016 | Ramat HaSharon, Israel | Hard | (Israel) Shelly Krolitzky | (Sweden) Linnea Malmqvist (Belarus) Anastasiya Shleptsova | 6–4, 4–6, [10–8] |
| Runner-up | 2. | 6 May 2017 | Acre, Israel | Hard | (Israel) Shelly Krolitzky | (Israel) Vlada Ekshibarova (Greece) Despina Papamichail | 4–6, 3–6 |
| Winner | 2. | 24 June 2017 | Herzliya, Israel | Hard | (Israel) Shelly Krolitzky | (Russia) Sofia Dmitrieva (Sweden) Linnea Malmqvist | 2–6, 6–0, [12–10] |
| Winner | 3. | 4 May 2018 | Acre, Israel | Hard | (United States) Madeleine Kobelt | (United States) Madison Bourguignon (United States) Aimee Tarun | 6–1, 6–3 |
| Runner-up | 3. | 20 May 2018 | Tiberias, Israel | Hard | (Israel) Shavit Kimchi | (United States) Madeleine Kobelt (India) Riya Bhatia | 3–6, 2–6 |
| Runner-up | 4. | 25 August 2018 | Caslano, Switzerland | Clay | (Italy) Natasha Piludu | (Spain) Alba Marin Carrillo (Bolivia) Noelia Zeballos | 4–6, 4–6 |
| Winner | 4. | 7 October 2018 | Herzliya, Israel | Hard | (United States) Madeleine Kobelt | (Germany) Anastasia Reimchen (United States) Aimee Tarun | 6–4, 6–3 |
| Winner | 5. | 4 November 2018 | Heraklion, Greece | Clay | (Romania) Oana Gavrilă | (Poland) Anna Hertel (Switzerland) Xenia Knoll | 6–3, 1–6, [10–3] |
| Winner | 6. | 25 November 2018 | Stellenbosch, South Africa | Hard | (Netherlands) Eva Vedder | (Russia) Anastasia Shaulskaya (United States) Stephanie Kent | 6–3, 6–0 |
| Winner | 7. | 2 December 2018 | Stellenbosch, South Africa | Hard | (Netherlands) Eva Vedder | (Russia) Ekaterina Makarova (South Africa) Sari Stegmann | 6–0, 6–4 |
| Winner | 8. | 14 April 2019 | ITF Cancún, Mexico | Hard | (Japan) Natsumi Kawaguchi | (United Kingdom) Emily Appleton (Mexico) María Portillo Ramírez | 6–1, 6–2 |
| Winner | 9. | 12 May 2019 | ITF Heraklion, Greece | Clay | (Serbia) Draginja Vuković | (Kazakhstan) Zhibek Kulambayeva (Hungary) Vanda Lukács | walkover |
| Winner | 10. | Nov 2019 | ITF Cancún, Mexico | Hard | (Netherlands) Eva Vedder | (United States) Allura Zamarripa (United States) Maribella Zamarripa | 6–4, 4–6, [10–2] |
| Runner-up | 5. | 15 November 2020 | ITF Heraklion, Greece | Clay | (Israel) Shavit Kimchi | (Italy) Verena Meliss (Italy) Martina Spigarelli | 5–7, 2–6 |

== See also ==
- List of Jews in sports § Tennis
