= Ksenia Aleshina =

Russian tennis player

Ksenia Aleshina Ксения Алешина
- Full name: Ksenia Yevgenyevna Aleshina
- Country (sports): Russia
- Born: 28 January 2003 (age 22)
- Plays: Right-handed (two-handed backhand)
- Prize money: $1,080

Singles
- Career record: 0–1
- Career titles: 0

Doubles
- Career record: 0–1
- Career titles: 0
- Last updated on: 20 June 2021.

Ksenia Yevgenyevna Aleshina (Russian: Ксения Евгеньевна Алешина; born 28 January 2003) is a Russian tennis player.

She has a career-high ITF junior combined ranking of 366, achieved on 28 January 2019.

Aleshina made her WTA Tour main-draw debut at the 2019 Baltic Open in the doubles draw, partnering Kamilla Bartone.
