= Shelly Krolitzky =

Israeli tennis player

- Native name: שלי קרוליצקי
- Country (sports): Israel
- Residence: Azur, Israel
- Born: 8 July 1999 (age 25)
- Plays: Right-handed (double handed backhand)
- Prize money: US$ 1,986

Singles
- Career record: 12 - 7
- Highest ranking: No. 1,098 (10 October 2016)

Grand Slam singles results
- US Open Junior: 2R (2016)

Doubles
- Career record: 11 - 6
- Career titles: 0 WTA, 2 ITF
- Highest ranking: No. 751 (25 September 2017)

Grand Slam doubles results
- US Open Junior: 2R (2016)

Team competitions
- Fed Cup: 0–4

Shelly Krolitzky (Hebrew: שלי קרוליצקי; born 8 July 1999) is an Israeli former tennis player.

Krolitzky has a career-high WTA singles ranking of 1,098, achieved on 10 October 2016, and a career-high WTA doubles ranking of 751, achieved on 25 September 2017. Krolitzky has won one ITF doubles title.

== Biography ==
She lives in Azur, Israel.

Krolitzky has represented Israel in the Fed Cup, where she has a W/L record of 0–4.

== ITF Finals ==
=== Doubles (2–2) ===
Legend
$100,000 tournaments
$75,000/$80,000 tournaments
$50,000/$60,000 tournaments
$25,000 tournaments
$10,000/$15,000 tournaments

Result	No.	Date	Category	Tournament	Surface	Partner	Opponents	Score
Runner-up	1.	23 May 2016	10,000	Ramat Gan, Israel	Hard	(Israel) Alona Pushkarevsky	(Hungary) Naomi Totka (Montenegro) Ana Veselinović	6–2, 3–6, [6–10]
Winner	1.	3 October 2016	10,000	Ramat HaSharon, Israel	Hard	(Israel) Maya Tahan	(Sweden) Linnéa Malmqvist (Belarus) Anastasiya Shleptsova	6–4, 4–6, [10–8]
Runner-up	2.	6 May 2017	15,000	Acre, Israel	Hard	(Israel) Maya Tahan	(Israel) Vlada Ekshibarova (Greece) Despina Papamichail	4–6, 3–6
Winner	2.	24 June 2017	15,000	Herzliya, Israel	Hard	(Israel) Maya Tahan	(Russia) Sofia Dmitrieva (Sweden) Linnéa Malmqvist	2–6, 6–0, [12–10]
