= Valeria Gorlatš =

Estonian tennis player

Valeria Gorlats
- Country (sports): Estonia
- Born: 31 March 1998 (age 27) Tallinn, Estonia
- Prize money: $5,982

Singles
- Career record: 30–26
- Career titles: 0
- Highest ranking: 883 (31 October 2016)

Doubles
- Career record: 16–14
- Career titles: 0
- Highest ranking: 975 (12 September 2016)

Team competitions
- Fed Cup: 3–12
- Last updated on: 8 November 2020.

Valeria Gorlats (born 31 March 1998) is an Estonian tennis player.

On 31 October 2016, she reached her best singles ranking of world No. 883. On 12 September 2016, she peaked at No. 975 in the doubles rankings.

Playing for Estonia at the Fed Cup, Gorlats has a win–loss record of 3–12.

== ITF Circuit finals ==
=== Doubles: 2 (runner-ups) ===
Legend $100,000 tournaments $80,000 tournaments $60,000 tournaments $25,000 tournaments $15,000 tournaments $10,000 tournaments	Finals by surface Hard (0–1) Clay (0–1) Grass (0–0) Carpet (0–0)

Result	No.	Date	Tournament	Tier	Surface	Partner	Opponents	Score
Loss	1.	2 November 2015	ITF Stockholm, Sweden	10,000	Hard (i)	(Italy) Deborah Chiesa	(Poland) Olga Brózda (Ukraine) Anastasiya Shoshyna	3–6, 2–6
Loss	2.	31 October 2016	ITF Antalya, Turkey	10,000	Clay	(Bulgaria) Dia Evtimova	(Turkey) Ayla Aksu (Turkey) Melis Sezer	1–6, 6–7^{(5–7)}
