= Israel Billie Jean King Cup team =

Israeli national women's tennis team

Israel
- Captain: Tzipora Obziler
- ITF ranking: 35 ▲1 (16 November 2015)
- Colors: light blue & white
- First year: 1972
- Years played: 42
- Ties played (W–L): 141 (72–69)
- Years in World Group: 19 (5–19)
- Best finish: Quarterfinal (2008)
- Most total wins: Tzipora Obziler (51–39)
- Most singles wins: Anna Smashnova (38–24)
- Most doubles wins: Tzipora Obziler (28–23)
- Best doubles team: Julia Glushko / Shahar Pe'er (10–7)
- Most ties played: Anna Smashnova / Tzipora Obziler (61)
- Most years played: Anna Smashnova (16)

The Israel women's national tennis team (Hebrew: נבחרת ישראל בגביע הפדרציה) is the representative national team of Israel in the Billie Jean King Cup competition. In the 2007 Fed Cup, they qualified from the World Group II and World Group play-offs to reach the elite World Group for the first time in the team's history. They participated within this group at the 2008 Fed Cup.

== History ==
=== Members of the inaugural team ===
- Mara Cohen-Mintz
- Tova Epstein

=== 2017 ===
Israel lost to Georgia in relegation play-offs after finishing last in Pool D.

=== 2018 ===
Israel ranked ahead of Luxuemborg in win–loss percentage in Pool B. Israel was defeated by Denmark in the promotional play-offs.

=== 2019 ===
Finishing second behind Luxuemborg, Israel managed to reach the promotional play-off for second consecutive year but lost to Austria 2-0.

=== Future ===
Without Julia Glushko and Shahar Peer, Israeli team face daunting task of qualifying for Europe Group I in the Fed Cup.

== Current team (2017) ==
- Julia Glushko
- Deniz Khazaniuk
- Maya Tahan
- Shelly Krolitzky

== See also ==
- List of Israel Fed Cup team representatives
- Billie Jean King Cup
- Israel Davis Cup team
- Israel at the Hopman Cup
- Canada Stadium
