= 2018 Grand Prix SAR La Princesse Lalla Meryem – Doubles =

Doubles
- 2018 Grand Prix SAR La Princesse Lalla Meryem

Final
- Champions: (Russia) Anna Blinkova (Romania) Raluca Olaru
- Runners-up: (Spain) Georgina García Pérez (Hungary) Fanny Stollár
- Score: 6–4, 6–4

Events
Singles	Doubles
← 2017 ·	Grand Prix SAR La Princesse Lalla Meryem	· 2019 →

Tímea Babos and Andrea Sestini Hlaváčková were the defending champions, but Babos chose not to participate and Sestini Hlaváčková chose to compete in Prague instead.

Anna Blinkova and Raluca Olaru won the title, defeating Georgina García Pérez and Fanny Stollár in the final, 6–4, 6–4.

== Seeds ==
1. (Czech Republic) Barbora Krejčíková / (United Kingdom) Anna Smith (quarterfinals)
2. (Poland) Alicja Rosolska / (United States) Abigail Spears (quarterfinals)
3. (Australia) Monique Adamczak / (Switzerland) Xenia Knoll (quarterfinals)
4. (Georgia (country)) Oksana Kalashnikova / (Netherlands) Bibiane Schoofs (first round)

== Draw ==
=== Key ===
- Q = Qualifier
- WC = Wild card
- LL = Lucky loser
- Alt = Alternate
- SE = Special exempt
- PR = Protected ranking
- ITF = ITF entry
- JE = Junior exempt
- w/o = Walkover
- r = Retired
- d = Defaulted
- SR = Special ranking

=== Draw ===
First round
1	(Czech Republic) B Krejčíková (United Kingdom) A Smith	6	6
(Turkey) B Eraydın (Turkey) İ Soylu	2	3
(Spain) S Soler Espinosa (Belgium) M Zanevska	3	2
(Australia) L Cabrera (Croatia) J Fett	6	6
4	(Georgia (country)) O Kalashnikova (Netherlands) B Schoofs	6	3	[5]
(Russia) A Blinkova (Romania) R Olaru	2	6	[10]
(Switzerland) T Bacsinszky (Switzerland) J Teichmann	6^{1}	6^{4}
(Croatia) D Jurak (Australia) J Moore	7^{7}	7^{7}
(Spain) G García Pérez (Hungary) F Stollár	6	6
(Germany) N Geuer (Netherlands) A Rus	2	1
WC	(Burundi) S Nahimana (Egypt) S Samir	3	3
3	(Australia) M Adamczak (Switzerland) X Knoll	6	6
(Sweden) R Peterson (Spain) S Sorribes Tormo	6	6
WC	(Morocco) O Aziz (Morocco) D El Jardi	4	2
(United States) K Christian (United States) S Santamaria	3	2
2	(Poland) A Rosolska (United States) A Spears	6	6

Quarterfinals
1	(Czech Republic) B Krejčíková (United Kingdom) A Smith	5	2
(Australia) L Cabrera (Croatia) J Fett	7	6
(Russia) A Blinkova (Romania) R Olaru	7	6^{5}	[13]
(Croatia) D Jurak (Australia) J Moore	5	7^{7}	[11]
(Spain) G García Pérez (Hungary) F Stollár	6	1	[10]
3	(Australia) M Adamczak (Switzerland) X Knoll	3	6	[7]
(Sweden) R Peterson (Spain) S Sorribes Tormo	6	1	[10]
2	(Poland) A Rosolska (United States) A Spears	4	6	[6]

Semifinals
(Australia) L Cabrera (Croatia) J Fett	2	3
(Russia) A Blinkova (Romania) R Olaru	6	6
(Spain) G García Pérez (Hungary) F Stollár	6	6
(Sweden) R Peterson (Spain) S Sorribes Tormo	4	4

Final
(Russia) A Blinkova (Romania) R Olaru	6	6
(Spain) G García Pérez (Hungary) F Stollár	4	4
