= Zani Barnard =

South African tennis player

- Country (sports): South Africa
- Born: 15 March 1999 (age 26) Witbank, South Africa
- Plays: Right-handed (two-handed backhand)
- College: MTSU
- Prize money: $1,879

Singles
- Career record: 6–7

Grand Slam singles results
- Australian Open Junior: 1R (2016)

Doubles
- Career record: 6–5

Grand Slam doubles results
- Australian Open Junior: 1R (2016)

Team competitions
- Fed Cup: 0–1
- Last updated on: 31 August 2020.

Zani Barnard (born 15 March 1999) is an inactive South African tennis player. She played for South Africa on the Fed Cup in 2019.

Barnard has a career-high ITF juniors ranking of 73, achieved on 29 February 2016.

She started studying at Middle Tennessee State University (MTSU), in 2017 with her twin sister Lee.

== ITF Circuit finals ==
=== Doubles (0–1) ===
Legend $100,000 tournaments $80,000 tournaments $60,000 tournaments $25,000 tournaments $15,000 tournaments	Finals by surface Hard (0–1) Clay (0–0) Grass (0–0) Carpet (0–0)

Result	W–L	Date	Tournament	Tier	Surface	Partner	Opponents	Score
Loss	0–1	Jun 2019	ITF Jakarta, Indonesia	15,000	Hard	(South Africa) Lee Barnard	(Netherlands) Arianne Hartono (Indonesia) Nadia Ravita	6–2, 4–6, [9–11]

== ITF Junior Circuit finals ==
Category GA
Category G1
Category G2
Category G3
Category G4
Category G5

=== Singles (2–9) ===
Outcome	No.	Date	Tournament	Grade	Surface	Opponent	Score
Runner-up	1.	10 May 2014	Windhoek, Namibia	G4	Hard	(South Africa) Lee Barnard	6–7^{(3–7)}, 4–6
Runner-up	2.	17 May 2014	Windhoek, Namibia	G5	Hard	(South Africa) Katie Poluta	6–3, 4–6, 4–6
Winner	1.	24 October 2014	Stellenbosch, South Africa	G5	Hard	(Netherlands) Eva Vedder	6–1, 6–3
Winner	2.	31 October 2014	Stellenbosch, South Africa	G5	Hard	(South Africa) Nadine De Villiers	6–3, 6–1
Runner-up	3.	27 February 2015	Potchefstroom, South Africa	G5	Hard	(South Africa) Lee Barnard	7–6^{(7–4)}, 2–6, 1–6
Runner-up	4.	6 March 2015	Potchefstroom, South Africa	G5	Hard	(South Africa) Lee Barnard	4–6, 2–6
Runner-up	5.	25 April 2015	Tunis, Tunisia	G3	Hard	(Canada) Katarina Kopcalic	7–6^{(7–1)}, 1–6, 1–6
Runner-up	6.	2 May 2015	Tlemcen, Algeria	G3	Clay	(Algeria) Inès Ibbou	1–6, 0–6
Runner-up	7.	26 July 2015	Johannesburg, South Africa	G4	Hard	(South Africa) Lee Barnard	2–6, 4–6
Runner-up	8.	2 August 2015	Pretoria, South Africa	G4	Hard	(South Africa) Lee Barnard	4–6, 4–6
Runner-up	9.	22 August 2015	Harare, Zimbabwe	G3	Hard	(South Africa) Lee Barnard	3–2 ret.

=== Doubles (7–5) ===
Outcome	No.	Date	Tournament	Grade	Surface	Partner	Opponents	Score
Runner-up	1.	10 May 2014	Windhoek, Namibia	G4	Hard	(South Africa) Lee Barnard	(South Africa) Nadine De Villiers (South Africa) Katie Poluta	4–6, 1–6
Winner	1.	25 July 2014	Johannesburg, South Africa	G4	Hard	(South Africa) Lee Barnard	(South Africa) Huibre-Mare Botes (South Africa) Louise-Mare Botes	6–2, 6–2
Winner	2.	24 October 2014	Stellenbosch, South Africa	G5	Hard	(South Africa) Lee Barnard	(United Kingdom) Georgia Lawson (Nigeria) Elizabeth Pam	6–1, 6–0
Winner	3.	31 October 2014	Stellenbosch, South Africa	G5	Hard	(South Africa) Lee Barnard	(South Africa) Nadine De Villiers (South Africa) Rouxanne Janse van Rensburg	6–2, 6–3
Runner-up	2.	27 February 2015	Potchefstroom, South Africa	G5	Hard	(South Africa) Lee Barnard	(South Africa) Margo Landmann (Netherlands) Sem Wensveen	6–3, 5–7, [7–10]
Winner	4.	25 April 2015	Tunis, Tunisia	G3	Hard	(South Africa) Lee Barnard	(United Kingdom) Georgina Axon (Namibia) Lesedi Sheya Jacobs	7–5, 6–7^{(5–7)}, [10–3]
Runner-up	3.	26 July 2015	Johannesburg, South Africa	G4	Hard	(South Africa) Lee Barnard	(Morocco) Ghita Benhadi (Chinese Taipei) Liang En-shuo	4–6, 2–6
Winner	5.	2 August 2015	Pretoria, South Africa	G4	Hard	(South Africa) Lee Barnard	(Morocco) Ghita Benhadi (Morocco) Diae El Jardi	6–4, 6–4
Runner-up	4.	9 August 2015	Nanjing, China	G1	Hard	(South Africa) Lee Barnard	(Indonesia) Rifanty Kahfiani (Chinese Taipei) Lee Yang	2–6, 2–6
Runner-up	5.	22 August 2015	Harare, Zimbabwe	G3	Hard	(South Africa) Lee Barnard	(Gabon) Célestine Avomo (Namibia) Lesedi Sheya Jacobs	7–6^{(7–3)}, 1–6, [5–10]
Runner-up	6.	21 January 2016	Traralgon, AUS	G1	Hard	(South Africa) Lee Barnard	(Netherlands) Nina Kruijer (Romania) Ioana Mincă	3–6, 1–6

== National representation ==
=== Fed Cup ===
Barnard made her Fed Cup debut for South Africa in 2019, while the team was competing in the Europe/Africa Zone Group II, when she was 19 years and 330 days old.

==== Fed Cup (0–1) ====
Group membership World Group (0–0) World Group Play-off (0–0) World Group II (0–0) World Group II Play-off (0–0) Europe/Africa Group (0–1)	Matches by surface Hard (0–1) Clay (0–0) Grass (0–0) Carpet (0–0)	Matches by type Singles (0–1) Doubles (0–0)	Matches by setting Indoors (0–1) Outdoors (0–0)

===== Singles (0–1) =====
Edition	Stage	Date	Location	Against	Surface	Opponent	W/L	Score
2019 Fed Cup; Europe/Africa Zone Group II	Pool B	8 February 2019	Esch-sur-Alzette, Luxembourg	Portugal	Hard (i)	Ana Filipa Santos	L	4–6, 5–7
