= Gergana Topalova =

Bulgarian tennis player (born 2000)

Gergana Topalova Гергана Топалова
- Country (sports): Bulgaria
- Residence: Sofia, Bulgaria
- Born: 22 February 2000 (age 26) Plovdiv, Bulgaria
- Turned pro: 2018
- Plays: Right (two-handed backhand)
- Prize money: $212,932

Singles
- Career record: 263–208
- Career titles: 6 ITF
- Highest ranking: No. 210 (27 May 2024)
- Current ranking: No. 490 (29 June 2026)

Grand Slam singles results
- Wimbledon: Q3 (2024)
- US Open: Q1 (2024)

Doubles
- Career record: 108–81
- Career titles: 5 ITF
- Highest ranking: No. 388 (12 September 2022)
- Current ranking: No. 1,193 (29 June 2026)

Team competitions
- Fed Cup: 7–7 (singles 3–4)
- Last updated on: 1 July 2026.

Gergana Topalova (Bulgarian: Гергана Топалова; born 22 February 2000) is a Bulgarian tennis player. She has career-high WTA rankings of 210 in singles and 388 in doubles.

Topalova has won six singles titles and five doubles titles on the ITF Circuit. On the ITF Junior Circuit, she had a career-high combined ranking of No. 31, achieved on 22 January 2018.

== Career ==
In 2019, Topalova made her Fed Cup debut for Bulgaria.

=== 2023–2024: WTA Tour debut ===
On 23 November 2022, she was confirmed as a participant at the 2023 United Cup as part of the Bulgarian team. On New Year's Eve 2022, she made her debut in mixed doubles match alongside Adrian Andreev which they lost to the top-seeded team of Maria Sakkari and Stefanos Tsitsipas. The following day, she made her WTA Tour debut and lost her maiden singles match to Elise Mertens in three sets.

Topalova participated in the qualifying draw of the 2023 Hobart International. She entered as an alternate and lost in the first round of qualifying to Diane Parry.

Topalova reached the final round of the qualifying competition at the 2024 Wimbledon Championships on her major qualifying debut.

She entered the main-draw at the 2024 Iași Open as a qualifier. She also qualified for the main draw of the 2024 Budapest Grand Prix but lost to fourth seed Sara Sorribes Tormo, in three sets.

== Grand Slam performance timeline ==
Key
W	F	SF	QF	#R	RR	Q#	P#	DNQ	A	Z#	PO	G	S	B	NMS	NTI	P	NH

(W) winner; (F) finalist; (SF) semifinalist; (QF) quarterfinalist; (#R) rounds 4, 3, 2, 1; (RR) round-robin stage; (Q#) qualification round; (P#) preliminary round; (DNQ) did not qualify; (A) absent; (Z#) Davis/Fed Cup Zonal Group (with number indication) or (PO) play-off; (G) gold, (S) silver or (B) bronze Olympic/Paralympic medal; (NMS) not a Masters tournament; (NTI) not a Tier I tournament; (P) postponed; (NH) not held; (SR) strike rate (events won / competed); (W–L) win–loss record.
To avoid confusion and double counting, these charts are updated at the conclusion of a tournament or when the player's participation has ended.

=== Singles ===
Tournament	2024	2025	W–L
Australian Open	A	A	0–0
French Open	A	A	0–0
Wimbledon	Q3	A	0–0
US Open	Q1	A	0–0
Win–loss	0–0	0–0	0–0

== ITF Circuit finals ==
=== Singles: 12 (6 titles, 6 runner-ups) ===
Legend W40 tournaments W25/W35 tournaments W15 tournaments	Finals by surface Hard (1–0) Clay (5–6)

Result	W–L	Date	Tournament	Tier	Surface	Opponent	Score
Win	1–0	Oct 2017	ITF Sozopol, Bulgaria	W15	Hard	(France) Léa Tholey	6–3, 2–6, 6–3
Win	2–0	May 2018	ITF Cairo, Egypt	W15	Clay	(Spain) Nuria Párrizas Díaz	7–5, 7–6^{(7–3)}
Win	3–0	Nov 2020	ITF Heraklion, Greece	W15	Clay	(Germany) Romy Koelzer	6–4, 6–0
Win	4–0	May 2021	ITF Cairo, Egypt	W15	Clay	(Russia) Elina Avanesyan	6–3, 6–3
Win	5–0	Aug 2022	ITF Agadir, Morocco	W25	Clay	(Italy) Angelica Moratelli	2–6, 6–2, 6–3
Loss	5–1	Aug 2022	ITF Parnu, Estonia	W25	Clay	(Poland) Weronika Falkowska	5–7, 2–6
Loss	5–2	Jul 2023	ITF Santo Domingo, Dominican Republic	W25	Clay	(Argentina) Martina Capurro	6–3, 0–6, 0–6
Loss	5–3	Aug 2023	ITF Wrocław, Poland	W40	Clay	Darya Astakhova	1–6, 5–7
Win	6–3	Sep 2023	ITF Saint-Palais-sur-Mer, France	W40	Clay	(Lithuania) Justina Mikulskytė	7–5, 5–7, 6–1
Loss	6–4	Oct 2023	ITF Lisbon, Portugal	W40	Clay	(Ukraine) Katarina Zavatska	3–6, 6–2, 5–7
Loss	6–5	May 2024	ITF Båstad, Sweden	W35	Clay	(Turkey) Berfu Cengiz	4–6, 2–6
Loss	6–6	Apr 2025	ITF Leme, Brazil	W35	Clay	Alisa Oktiabreva	1–6, 5–7

=== Doubles: 15 (5 titles, 10 runner-ups) ===
Legend W40 tournaments W25/35 tournaments W15 tournaments	Finals by surface Hard (1–3) Clay (4–7)

Result	W–L	Date	Tournament	Tier	Surface	Partner	Opponents	Score
Win	1–0	May 2018	ITF Cairo, Egypt	W15	Clay	(Bulgaria) Petia Arshinkova	(India) Riya Bhatia (United States) Shelby Talcott	4–6, 6–3, [10–4]
Loss	1–1	Nov 2019	ITF Gwalior, India	W25	Clay	(Bulgaria) Petia Arshinkova	(Japan) Mana Kawamura (Japan) Funa Kozaki	4–6, 1–6
Loss	1–2	Feb 2020	ITF Monastir, Tunisia	W15	Hard	(Bulgaria) Petia Arshinkova	(France) Julie Belgraver (France) Mylène Halemai	6–2, 1–6, [4–10]
Loss	1–3	Mar 2020	ITF Monastir, Tunisia	W15	Hard	(Bulgaria) Petia Arshinkova	(France) Mylène Halemai (Romania) Andreea Prisăcariu	3–6, 4–6
Loss	1–4	Dec 2020	ITF Antalya, Turkey	W15	Clay	(Latvia) Daniela Vismane	(United States) Hurricane Tyra Black (Switzerland) Svenja Ochsner	6–7^{(2)}, 5–7
Loss	1–5	Feb 2021	ITF Antalya, Turkey	W15	Clay	(Bulgaria) Petia Arshinkova	(Colombia) María Herazo González (Colombia) Yuliana Lizarazo	2–6, 1–6
Loss	1–6	Oct 2021	ITF Sozopol, Bulgaria	W15	Hard	(Bulgaria) Julia Terziyska	(Bulgaria) Katerina Dimitrova (Romania) Oana Gavrilă	6–3, 4–6, [1–10]
Win	2–6	Nov 2021	ITF Monastir, Tunisia	W15	Hard	(Belgium) Eliessa Vanlangendonck	(Netherlands) Anouk Koevermans (Netherlands) Lexie Stevens	6–1, 6–2
Win	3–6	Apr 2022	ITF Antalya, Turkey	W15	Clay	Vlada Koval	Ksenia Laskutova (Greece) Sapfo Sakellaridi	7–6^{(9)}, 6–2
Loss	3–7	Apr 2022	ITF Antalya, Turkey	W15	Clay	Ksenia Laskutova	(Sweden) Vanessa Ersöz (Turkey) Doğa Türkmen	6–7^{(2)}, 6–3, [5–10]
Loss	3–8	Aug 2022	ITF Parnu, Estonia	W25	Clay	(Greece) Eleni Christofi	(Lithuania) Justina Mikulskytė (Ukraine) Valeriya Strakhova	2–6, 6–4, [8–10]
Win	4–8	Sep 2023	ITF Oldenzaal, Netherlands	W40	Clay	(Latvia) Daniela Vismane	(Netherlands) Isabelle Haverlag (Netherlands) Eva Vedder	7–5, 2–6, [10–5]
Loss	4–9	Sep 2023	ITF Pazardzhik, Bulgaria	W40	Clay	(Latvia) Daniela Vismane	(Romania) Cristina Dinu (Slovakia) Radka Zelníčková	6–1, 5–7, [6–10]
Win	5–9	Apr 2025	ITF São Paulo, Brazil	W35	Clay	(Poland) Anna Hertel	(Brazil) Carolina Bohrer Martins (United States) Lilian Poling	5–7, 6–1, [10–6]
Loss	5–10	May 2025	ITF Boca Raton, United States	W35	Clay	(Greece) Despina Papamichail	(United States) Ayana Akli (Morocco) Diae El Jardi	6–7^{(1)}, 5–7

== ITF Junior Circuit finals ==
Legend
Category G1
Category G2
Category G3
Category G4
Category G5

=== Singles (4–3) ===
Result	W–L	Date	Tournament	Grade	Surface	Opponent	Score
Win	1–0	Mar 2016	ITF Trnava, Slovakia	G4	Hard (i)	(Slovakia) Adriana Šenkárová	6–3, 6–4
Loss	1–1	Sep 2016	ITF Cairo, Egypt	G2	Clay	(New Zealand) Lulu Sun	4–6, 5–7
Loss	1–2	Mar 2017	ITF Tashkent, Uzbekistan	G2	Hard	(Ukraine) Daria Snigur	0–6, 0–2 ret.
Win	2–2	Apr 2017	ITF Plovdiv, Bulgaria	G2	Clay	(Finland) Oona Orpana	6–1, 6–3
Win	3–2	Oct 2017	ITF Montevideo, Uruguay	G2	Clay	(Argentina) Ana Geller	6–2, 6–3
Win	4–2	Nov 2017	ITF La Paz, Bolivia	G2	Clay	(Guatemala) Gabriela Rivera	6–3, 6–4
Loss	4–3	Apr 2018	ITF Plovdiv, Bulgaria	G2	Clay	(Russia) Elina Avanesyan	3–6, 4–6

=== Doubles (2–3) ===
Result	W–L	Date	Tournament	Grade	Surface	Partner	Opponents	Score
Win	1–0	Aug 2015	ITF Sofia, Bulgaria	G5	Clay	(Romania) Laura Cazacu	(North Macedonia) Katarina Marinkovikj (Bulgaria) Derya Yahe	5–7, 6–2, [12–10]
Win	2–0	Oct 2015	ITF Mohammedia, Morocco	G4	Clay	(Morocco) Oumaima Aziz	(Morocco) Diae El Jardi (Burundi) Sada Nahimana	6–3, 6–4
Loss	2–1	Apr 2017	ITF Plovdiv, Bulgaria	G2	Clay	(Germany) Linda Puppendahl	(Brazil) Vitória Okuyama (Brazil) Nathalia Wolf Gasparin	5–7, 4–6
Loss	2–2	May 2017	ITF Casablanca, Morocco	G1	Clay	(Poland) Weronika Falkowska	(United States) Lea Ma (China) Zheng Qinwen	6–7^{(4)}, 1–6
Loss	2–3	Apr 2018	ITF Plovdiv, Bulgaria	G2	Clay	(Poland) Weronika Falkowska	(Russia) Elina Avanesyan (Ukraine) Diana Khodan	2–6, 6–4, [6–10]

== National representation ==
=== Fed Cup/Billie Jean King Cup ===
Gergana Topalova debuted for the Bulgaria Fed Cup team in 2019; since then she has accumulated a win–loss record of 3–4 in singles and 4–3 in doubles (7–7 overall).

==== Singles (3–4) ====
Edition	Round	Date	Location	Against	Surface	Opponent	W/L	Result
2023	Z1 RR	11 Apr 2023	Antalya (TUR)	Croatia	Clay	Tara Würth	W	6–4, 2–6, 6–3
2023	Z1 RR	12 Apr 2023	Antalya (TUR)	Sweden	Clay	Caijsa Hennemann	W	1–6, 7–5, 6–3
2023	Z1 RR	13 Apr 2023	Antalya (TUR)	Norway	Clay	Malene Helgø	L	0–6, 2–6
2023	Z1 RR	14 Apr 2023	Antalya (TUR)	Denmark	Clay	Clara Tauson	L	3–6, 1–6
2024	Z1 RR	8 Apr 2024	Antalya (TUR)	Hungary	Clay	Adrienn Nagy	L	5–7, 6–7^{(4–7)}
2024	Z1 PO	12 Apr 2024	Antalya (TUR)	Norway	Clay	Emily Sartz-Lunde	W	3–6, 6–3, 6–2
2024	Z1 PO	13 Apr 2024	Antalya (TUR)	Portugal	Clay	Francisca Jorge	L	4–6, 4–6

==== Doubles (4–3) ====
Edition	Round	Date	Location	Partner	Surface	Against	Opponents	W/L	Result
2019	Z1 RR	8 Feb 2019	Zielona Góra (POL)	Petia Arshinkova	Hard (i)	Sweden	Mirjam Björklund; Cornelia Lister	L	2–6, 3–6
2020-21	Z1 RR	8 Feb 2019	Tallinn (EST)	Petia Arshinkova	Hard (i)	Ukraine	Lesia Tsurenko; Katarina Zavatska	L	2–6, 1–6
2023	Z1 RR	10 Apr 2023	Antalya (TUR)	Lia Karatancheva	Clay	Serbia	Katarina Kozarov; Lola Radivojević	W	2–6, 6–3, 6–2
2023	Z1 RR	13 Apr 2023	Antalya (TUR)	Lia Karatancheva	Clay	Norway	Ulrikke Eikeri; Malene Helgø	L	6–2, 1–6, 4–6
2023	Z1 RR	14 Apr 2023	Antalya (TUR)	Lia Karatancheva	Clay	Denmark	Rebecca Munk Mortensen; Johanne Svendsen	W	6–3, 3–6, 6–1
2024	Z1 RR	10 Apr 2024	Oeiras (POR)	Lia Karatancheva	Clay	Austria	Melanie Klaffner; Tamira Paszek	W	6–7^{(5–7)}, 6–1, [10–6]
2024	Z1 PO	12 Apr 2024	Oeiras (POR)	Lia Karatancheva	Clay	Norway	Emily Sartz-Lunde; Carina Syrtveit	W	7–6^{(7–3)}, 7–5

=== United Cup ===
==== Singles (0–1) ====
Edition	Round	Date	Location	Against	Surface	Opponent	W/L	Result
2023	RR	01 Jan 2023	Perth (AUS)	Belgium	Hard	Elise Mertens	L	4–6, 6–3, 0–6

==== Doubles (0–1) ====
Edition	Round	Date	Location	Partner	Surface	Against	Opponents	W/L	Result
2023	RR	20 Dec 2022	Perth (AUS)	Adrian Andreev	Hard	Greece	Maria Sakkari; Stefanos Tsitsipas	L	4–6, 4–6
