= 2018 Grand Prix SAR La Princesse Lalla Meryem =

- Date: 30 April – 5 May
- Edition: 18th
- Category: WTA International
- Draw: 32S / 16D
- Prize money: $250,000
- Surface: Clay / outdoor
- Location: Rabat, Morocco
- Venue: Club des Cheminots

Champions

Singles
- (Belgium) Elise Mertens

Doubles
- (Russia) Anna Blinkova / (Romania) Raluca Olaru
- Morocco Open

The 2018 Grand Prix SAR La Princesse Lalla Meryem was a women's professional tennis tournament played on clay courts. It was the 18th edition of the tournament and part of the WTA International tournaments category of the 2018 WTA Tour. It took place in Rabat, Morocco, between 30 April and 5 May 2018.

== Points and prize money ==
Event	W	F	SF	QF	Round of 16	Round of 32	Q	Q3	Q2	Q1
Women's singles	280	180	110	60	30	1	18	14	10	1
Women's doubles	280	180	110	60	1	—N/a	—N/a	—N/a	—N/a	—N/a

=== Prize money ===
Event	W	F	SF	QF	Round of 16	Round of 32	Q3	Q2	Q1
Women's singles	$43,000	$21,400	$11,300	$5,900	$3,310	$1,925	$1,005	$730	$530
Women's doubles	$12,300	$6,400	$3,435	$1,820	$960	—N/a	—N/a	—N/a	—N/a

== Singles main draw entrants ==
=== Seeds ===
Country	Player	Rank^{1}	Seed
BEL	Elise Mertens	17	1
SVK	Dominika Cibulková	33	2
CRO	Petra Martić	36	3
HUN	Tímea Babos	38	4
~~SUI~~	~~Timea Bacsinszky~~	~~46~~	~~5~~
KAZ	Zarina Diyas	52	6
SRB	Aleksandra Krunić	53	7
TPE	Hsieh Su-wei	59	8

- Rankings are as of April 23, 2018.

=== Other entrants ===
The following players received wildcards into the singles main draw:

- (Switzerland) Timea Bacsinszky
- (Morocco) Diae El Jardi
- (Ukraine) Katarina Zavatska

The following players received entry using a protected ranking into the main draw:

- (Slovakia) Kristína Kučová
- (United States) Bethanie Mattek-Sands

The following players received entry from the qualifying draw:

- (Spain) Paula Badosa Gibert
- (France) Fiona Ferro
- (Spain) Sílvia Soler Espinosa
- (Slovenia) Tamara Zidanšek

The following player received entry as a lucky loser:

- (Romania) Alexandra Dulgheru
- (Poland) Magdalena Fręch

=== Withdrawals ===
- (Switzerland) Timea Bacsinszky → replaced by (Poland) Magdalena Fręch
- (United States) Catherine Bellis → replaced by (United States) Christina McHale
- (Ukraine) Kateryna Bondarenko → replaced by (Italy) Sara Errani
- (Ukraine) Kateryna Kozlova → replaced by (Romania) Alexandra Dulgheru
- (Germany) Tatjana Maria → replaced by (Slovakia) Kristína Kučová
- (Greece) Maria Sakkari → replaced by (Croatia) Jana Fett

=== Retirements ===
- (Spain) Paula Badosa Gibert
- (Germany) Laura Siegemund

== Doubles main draw entrants ==
=== Seeds ===
Country	Player	Country	Player	Rank^{1}	Seed
CZE	Barbora Krejčíková	GBR	Anna Smith	75	1
POL	Alicja Rosolska	USA	Abigail Spears	88	2
AUS	Monique Adamczak	SUI	Xenia Knoll	122	3
GEO	Oksana Kalashnikova	NED	Bibiane Schoofs	155	4

- ^{1} Rankings as of April 23, 2018.

=== Other entrants ===
The following pairs received wildcards into the doubles main draw:

- (Morocco) Oumaima Aziz / (Morocco) Diae El Jardi
- (Burundi) Sada Nahimana / (Egypt) Sandra Samir

== Champions ==
=== Singles ===
- (Belgium) Elise Mertens def. (Australia) Ajla Tomljanović, 6–2, 7–6^{(7–4)}

=== Doubles ===
- (Russia) Anna Blinkova / (Romania) Raluca Olaru def. (Spain) Georgina García Pérez / (Hungary) Fanny Stollár, 6–4, 6–4
