= 2017 Grand Prix SAR La Princesse Lalla Meryem – Singles =

Singles
- 2017 Grand Prix SAR La Princesse Lalla Meryem

Final
- Champion: (Russia) Anastasia Pavlyuchenkova
- Runner-up: (Italy) Francesca Schiavone
- Score: 7–5, 7–5

Events
| Singles | Doubles |
- Grand Prix SAR La Princesse Lalla Meryem

Timea Bacsinszky was the defending champion, but lost in the second round to Catherine Bellis.

Anastasia Pavlyuchenkova won the title, defeating Francesca Schiavone in the final, 7–5, 7–5. It was her 10th WTA Tour title.

== Seeds ==
1. (Russia) Anastasia Pavlyuchenkova (champion)
2. (Switzerland) Timea Bacsinszky (second round)
3. (Australia) Daria Gavrilova (quarterfinals)
4. (Hungary) Tímea Babos (first round)
5. (Kazakhstan) Yulia Putintseva (second round)
6. (Romania) Irina-Camelia Begu (first round)
7. (United States) Lauren Davis (quarterfinals)
8. (United States) Alison Riske (second round)

== Draw ==
Key

- Q = Qualifier
- WC = Wild card
- LL = Lucky loser
- Alt = Alternate
- ITF = ITF entry
- PR = Protected ranking
- SR = Special ranking
- SE = Special exempt
- JE = Junior exempt
- JR = Junior Accelerator Programme entrant
- CO = College Accelerator Programme entrant
- NG = Next Gen Accelerator Program entrant
- w/o = Walkover
- r = Retired
- d = Defaulted

=== Finals ===
Semifinals
1 | (Russia) Anastasia Pavlyuchenkova | 6 | 6
(Italy) Sara Errani | 4 | 0
WC | (Italy) Francesca Schiavone | 7 | 6
(United States) Varvara Lepchenko | 5 | 4

Final
1 | (Russia) Anastasia Pavlyuchenkova | 7 | 7
WC | (Italy) Francesca Schiavone | 5 | 5

=== Top half ===
First round
1 | (Russia) A Pavlyuchenkova | 6 | 7^{8}
Q | (Switzerland) C Perrin | 2 | 6^{6}
(Russia) E Makarova | 6 | 6
(Belgium) Y Wickmayer | 3 | 2
(Ukraine) K Bondarenko | 6 | 6
LL | (Spain) S Soler Espinosa | 1 | 4
Q | (Argentina) N Podoroska | 2 | 1
7 | (United States) L Davis | 6 | 6
3 | (Australia) D Gavrilova | 6 | 6
(Belgium) M Zanevska | 2 | 2
(France) P Parmentier | 6 | 6^{7} | 2
(Belgium) E Mertens | 4 | 7^{9} | 6
WC | (Russia) A Blinkova | 3 | 3
(Italy) S Errani | 6 | 6
(France) A Cornet | 2 | 4
8 | (United States) A Riske | 6 | 6

Second round
1 | (Russia) A Pavlyuchenkova | 6 | 7
(Russia) E Makarova | 2 | 5
(Ukraine) K Bondarenko | 1 | 2
7 | (United States) L Davis | 6 | 6
3 | (Australia) D Gavrilova | 6 | 6
(Belgium) E Mertens | 2 | 1
(Italy) S Errani | 7^{9} | 6^{4} | 6
8 | (United States) A Riske | 6^{7} | 7^{7} | 2

Quarterfinals
1 | (Russia) A Pavlyuchenkova | 6 | 3 | 6
7 | (United States) L Davis | 4 | 6 | 3
3 | (Australia) D Gavrilova | 6^{5} | 4
(Italy) S Errani | 7^{7} | 6

Semifinals
1 | (Russia) A Pavlyuchenkova | 6 | 6
(Italy) S Errani | 4 | 0

=== Bottom half ===
First round
6 | (Romania) I-C Begu | 3 | 1
(Germany) T Maria | 6 | 6
(Kazakhstan) Y Shvedova | 6 | 7^{9}
Q | (Serbia) A Krunić | 2 | 6^{7}
Q | (Canada) G Dabrowski | 6 | 6
WC | (Morocco) L Qostal | 1 | 0
WC | (Italy) F Schiavone | 6 | 6
4 | (Hungary) T Babos | 4 | 1
5 | (Kazakhstan) Y Putintseva | 6 | 6
(Germany) A Petkovic | 3 | 4
(United States) V Lepchenko | 6 | 1 | 6
(Belgium) K Flipkens | 3 | 6 | 3
(United States) C Bellis | 6 | 4 | 7
(Japan) N Hibino | 1 | 6 | 5
(Sweden) J Larsson | 3 | 1
2 | (Switzerland) T Bacsinszky | 6 | 6

Second round
(Germany) T Maria | 6 | 6
(Kazakhstan) Y Shvedova | 3 | 4
Q | (Canada) G Dabrowski | 4 | 4
WC | (Italy) F Schiavone | 6 | 6
5 | (Kazakhstan) Y Putintseva | 6 | 4 | 1
(United States) V Lepchenko | 1 | 6 | 6
(United States) C Bellis | 6^{3} | 7 | 7
2 | (Switzerland) T Bacsinszky | 7^{7} | 5 | 5

Quarterfinals
(Germany) T Maria | 1 | 6 | 3
WC | (Italy) F Schiavone | 6 | 4 | 6
(United States) V Lepchenko | 6 | 6
(United States) C Bellis | 3 | 2

Semifinals
WC | (Italy) F Schiavone | 7 | 6
(United States) V Lepchenko | 5 | 4

== Qualifying ==
=== Seeds ===
1. (Tunisia) Ons Jabeur (first round)
2. (Belgium) Maryna Zanevska (moved to main draw)
3. (Serbia) Aleksandra Krunić (qualified)
4. (Belarus) Aryna Sabalenka (first round)
5. (Serbia) Nina Stojanović (second round)
6. (Spain) Sílvia Soler Espinosa (qualifying competition, lucky loser)
7. (Netherlands) Cindy Burger (first round, retired)
8. (Netherlands) Quirine Lemoine (second round)
9. (Argentina) Nadia Podoroska (qualified)

=== Qualifiers ===
1. (Canada) Gabriela Dabrowski
2. (Argentina) Nadia Podoroska
3. (Serbia) Aleksandra Krunić
4. (Switzerland) Conny Perrin

=== Lucky loser ===
1. (Spain) Sílvia Soler Espinosa

=== Draw ===
==== First qualifier ====
First round
1 | (Tunisia) Ons Jabeur | 2 | 6 | 4
(Switzerland) Amra Sadiković | 6 | 4 | 6
(France) Amandine Hesse | 6^{2} | 4
(Canada) Gabriela Dabrowski | 7^{7} | 6
(Slovakia) Daniela Hantuchová | 6 | 6
WC | (Morocco) Lilya Hadab | 1 | 0
(Ukraine) Olga Savchuk | 2 | 3
8 | (Netherlands) Quirine Lemoine | 6 | 6

Second round
(Switzerland) Amra Sadiković | 4 | 6 | 1
(Canada) Gabriela Dabrowski | 6 | 3 | 6
(Slovakia) Daniela Hantuchová | 6^{4} | 6 | 6
8 | (Netherlands) Quirine Lemoine | 7^{7} | 4 | 2

Qualifying competition
(Canada) Gabriela Dabrowski | 7^{9} | 6
(Slovakia) Daniela Hantuchová | 6^{7} | 3

==== Second qualifier ====
First round
9 | (Argentina) Nadia Podoroska | 6^{5} | 6 | 7
(Russia) Alla Kudryavtseva | 7^{7} | 4 | 5
(Netherlands) Lesley Kerkhove | 0 | 4
(Brazil) Teliana Pereira | 6 | 6
(Italy) Martina Trevisan | 6 | 6
(Spain) Laura Pous Tió | 4 | 1
(Brazil) Laura Pigossi | 6 | 6^{5} | 5
5 | (Serbia) Nina Stojanović | 3 | 7^{7} | 7

Second round
9 | (Argentina) Nadia Podoroska | 6 | 6
(Brazil) Teliana Pereira | 3 | 0
(Italy) Martina Trevisan | 6 | 6
5 | (Serbia) Nina Stojanović | 3 | 3

Qualifying competition
9 | (Argentina) Nadia Podoroska | 6 | 6
(Italy) Martina Trevisan | 3 | 2

==== Third qualifier ====
First round
3 | (Serbia) Aleksandra Krunić | 6 | 6
(Australia) Anastasia Rodionova | 0 | 3
(Czech Republic) Barbora Krejčíková | 6 | 6
WC | (Morocco) Abir Elfahimi | 2 | 0
(France) Chloé Paquet | 6 | 2 | 7
(Sweden) Cornelia Lister | 3 | 6 | 5
WC | (Morocco) Camilia Bandabdeljalil | 2 | 0
6 | (Spain) Sílvia Soler Espinosa | 6 | 6

Second round
3 | (Serbia) Aleksandra Krunić | 6 | 6
(Czech Republic) Barbora Krejčíková | 3 | 1
(France) Chloé Paquet | 2 | 3
6 | (Spain) Sílvia Soler Espinosa | 6 | 6

Qualifying competition
3 | (Serbia) Aleksandra Krunić | 6 | 6
6 | (Spain) Sílvia Soler Espinosa | 2 | 0

==== Fourth qualifier ====
First round
4 | (Belarus) Aryna Sabalenka | 6 | 2 | 3
(Serbia) Ivana Jorović | 3 | 6 | 6
(Netherlands) Arantxa Rus | 5 | 7 | 3
(Paraguay) Montserrat González | 7 | 5 | 6
WC | (Morocco) Rita Atik | 1 | 0
Alt | (United Kingdom) Tara Moore | 6 | 6
(Switzerland) Conny Perrin | 6 | 1
7 | (Netherlands) Cindy Burger | 1 | 0^{r}

Second round
(Serbia) Ivana Jorović | 6 | 6
(Paraguay) Montserrat González | 4 | 1
Alt | (United Kingdom) Tara Moore | 1 | 2
(Switzerland) Conny Perrin | 6 | 6

Qualifying competition
(Serbia) Ivana Jorović | 0 | 5
(Switzerland) Conny Perrin | 6 | 7
