= 2019 Fed Cup Europe/Africa Zone Group II – play-offs =

Subsection of tennis competition

The play-offs of the 2019 Fed Cup Europe/Africa Zone Group II were the final stages of the Group II zonal competition involving teams from Europe and Africa. Using the positions determined in their pools, the eight teams faced off to determine their placing in the 2019 Fed Cup Europe/Africa Zone Group II. The top two teams advanced to Group I, and the bottom two teams were relegated down to the Group III for the next year.

== Pool results ==
Placing	Pool A	Pool B
1	Austria	Luxembourg
2	Tunisia	Israel
3	Bosnia and Herzegovina	Portugal
4	—	South Africa

== Promotional play-offs ==
The first-placed teams of each pool played against the second-placed teams of the other pool in head-to-head rounds. The winner of each round advanced to the 2020 Europe/Africa Zone Group I.

=== Austria vs. Israel ===
Austria
2
Centre National de Tennis, Esch-sur-Alzette, Luxembourg
9 February
Hard (indoor)

Israel
0

			1	2	3
1	(Austria) (Israel)	Melanie Klaffner; Lina Glushko	6; 2	6; 1
2	(Austria) (Israel)	Barbara Haas; Maya Tahan	6; 0	7^{7} 6^{5}
3	(Austria) (Israel)	Barbara Haas / Melanie Klaffner; Lina Glushko / Maya Tahan				not played

=== Luxembourg vs. Tunisia ===
Luxembourg
2
Centre National de Tennis, Esch-sur-Alzette, Luxembourg
9 February
Hard (indoor)

Tunisia
0

			1	2	3
1	(Luxembourg) (Tunisia)	Eléonora Molinaro; Chiraz Bechri	7; 5	6; 2
2	(Luxembourg) (Tunisia)	Mandy Minella; Ons Jabeur	7; 5	6; 1
3	(Luxembourg) (Tunisia)	Mandy Minella / Eléonora Molinaro; Chiraz Bechri / Ons Jabeur				not played

== Relegation play-offs ==
The third-placed teams of the pools played against each other in a head-to-head round. The loser was relegated to the 2020 Europe/Africa Zone Group III alongside South Africa who finished last in Pool B.

=== Bosnia and Herzegovina vs. Portugal ===
Bosnia and Herzegovina
1
Centre National de Tennis, Esch-sur-Alzette, Luxembourg
9 February
Hard (indoor)

Portugal
2

			1	2	3
1	(Bosnia and Herzegovina) (Portugal)	Nefisa Berberović; Ana Filipa Santos	6; 1	6; 1
2	(Bosnia and Herzegovina) (Portugal)	Anita Husarić; Francisca Jorge	6; 3	4; 6	2; 6
3	(Bosnia and Herzegovina) (Portugal)	Nefisa Berberović / Anita Husarić; Maria Inês Fonte / Francisca Jorge	6; 3	4; 6	4; 6

== Final placements ==
Placing	Teams	
Promoted/First	Austria	Luxembourg
Third	Israel	Tunisia
Fifth	Portugal	
Relegated/Sixth	Bosnia and Herzegovina	
Relegated/Seventh	South Africa	

- Austria and Luxembourg were promoted to Europe/Africa Zone Group I in 2020.
- Bosnia and Herzegovina and South Africa were relegated to Europe/Africa Zone Group III in 2020.
