= 2017 Grand Prix SAR La Princesse Lalla Meryem – Doubles =

Doubles
- 2017 Grand Prix SAR La Princesse Lalla Meryem

Final
- Champions: (Hungary) Tímea Babos (Czech Republic) Andrea Hlaváčková
- Runners-up: (Serbia) Nina Stojanović (Belgium) Maryna Zanevska
- Score: 2–6, 6–3, [10–5]

Events
Singles	Doubles
← 2016 ·	Grand Prix SAR La Princesse Lalla Meryem	· 2018 →

Xenia Knoll and Aleksandra Krunić were the defending champions, but Knoll chose to compete in Prague instead. Krunić played alongside Daria Gavrilova, but lost in the semifinals to Tímea Babos and Andrea Hlaváčková.

Babos and Hlaváčková went on to win the title, defeating Nina Stojanović and Maryna Zanevska in the final, 2–6, 6–3, [10–5].

== Seeds ==
1. (Hungary) Tímea Babos / (Czech Republic) Andrea Hlaváčková (champions)
2. (Croatia) Darija Jurak / (Australia) Anastasia Rodionova (first round)
3. (Romania) Raluca Olaru / (Ukraine) Olga Savchuk (first round)
4. (Czech Republic) Barbora Krejčíková / (Russia) Alla Kudryavtseva (semifinals)

== Draw ==
=== Key ===
- Q = Qualifier
- WC = Wild card
- LL = Lucky loser
- Alt = Alternate
- SE = Special exempt
- PR = Protected ranking
- ITF = ITF entry
- JE = Junior exempt
- w/o = Walkover
- r = Retired
- d = Defaulted
- SR = Special ranking

=== Draw ===
First round
1	(Hungary) T Babos (Czech Republic) A Hlaváčková	6	6
WC	(Morocco) A Elfahimi (Morocco) L Hadab	0	2
(United States) L Davis (United States) N Melichar	1	4
(Brazil) L Pigossi (Argentina) N Podoroska	6	6
3	(Romania) R Olaru (Ukraine) O Savchuk	7^{7}	4	[4]
(Australia) D Gavrilova (Serbia) A Krunić	6^{1}	6	[10]
(Ukraine) K Bondarenko (United States) V Lepchenko	6	3	[11]
WC	(Spain) L Pous Tió (Morocco) L Qostal	1	6	[9]
(Netherlands) L Kerkhove (Belarus) L Marozava	6	4	[7]
(Russia) A Blinkova (Sweden) C Lister	1	6	[10]
(Switzerland) T Bacsinszky (Belgium) Y Wickmayer	4	6	[3]
4	(Czech Republic) B Krejčíková (Russia) A Kudryavtseva	6	4	[10]
(Netherlands) A Rus (Belarus) A Sabalenka	6^{3}	1
(Canada) G Dabrowski (United States) A Riske	7^{7}	6
(Serbia) N Stojanović (Belgium) M Zanevska	6	7
2	(Croatia) D Jurak (Australia) An Rodionova	2	5

Quarterfinals
1	(Hungary) T Babos (Czech Republic) A Hlaváčková	6	6
(Brazil) L Pigossi (Argentina) N Podoroska	3	2
(Australia) D Gavrilova (Serbia) A Krunić	7^{7}	7
(Ukraine) K Bondarenko (United States) V Lepchenko	6^{5}	5
(Russia) A Blinkova (Sweden) C Lister	4	6^{8}
4	(Czech Republic) B Krejčíková (Russia) A Kudryavtseva	6	7^{10}
(Canada) G Dabrowski (United States) A Riske	6	4	[7]
(Serbia) N Stojanović (Belgium) M Zanevska	3	6	[10]

Semifinals
1	(Hungary) T Babos (Czech Republic) A Hlaváčková	7^{8}	6
(Australia) D Gavrilova (Serbia) A Krunić	6^{6}	3
4	(Czech Republic) B Krejčíková (Russia) A Kudryavtseva	5	3
(Serbia) N Stojanović (Belgium) M Zanevska	7	6

Final
1	(Hungary) T Babos (Czech Republic) A Hlaváčková	2	6	[10]
(Serbia) N Stojanović (Belgium) M Zanevska	6	3	[5]
