= 2023 United Cup =

- Date: 29 December 2022 – 8 January 2023
- Edition: 1st
- Category: United Cup
- Draw: 18 teams
- Prize money: US$15,000,000
- Surface: Hard / outdoor
- Location: Brisbane, Queensland; Perth, Western Australia; Sydney, New South Wales, Australia
- Venue: Pat Rafter Arena; RAC Arena; Ken Rosewall Arena

Champions
- United States
- United Cup

The 2023 United Cup was the first edition of the United Cup, an international outdoor hard court mixed-gender team tennis competition held by the Association of Tennis Professionals (ATP) and the Women's Tennis Association (WTA). Serving as the opener for the 2023 ATP Tour and the 2023 WTA Tour, it was held from 29 December 2022 to 8 January 2023 at three venues in the Australian cities of Brisbane, Perth, and Sydney. It was also the first mixed-gender team event to offer both ATP rankings and WTA rankings points to its players: a player was able to win a maximum of 500 points.

Team United States defeated team Italy in the finals, 4–0, to capture the inaugural 2023 United Cup. Tem United States swept team Poland in the semifinals while team Italy lost one match in their defeat of team Greece.

== Format ==
Each city hosted two groups of three countries in a round robin format in the first week of the tournament. Each tie consisted of two men's and two women's singles matches, and one mixed doubles match. There was one men's singles and one women's singles match in each day or session, with the mixed doubles match taking place in the second day or in the evening session.

The group winners in each host city played off for one of three semi-final spots with the highest ranked host city playoff loser, taking into account all ties, becoming the fourth semi-finalist.

There was a travel day allocated before the semi-finals and final take place in Sydney.

== Qualification ==
18 countries qualified as follows:

- Six countries qualified based on the ATP ranking of their number one ranked singles player.
- Six countries qualified based on the WTA ranking of their number one ranked singles player.
- The final six countries qualified based on the combined ranking of their number one ranked ATP and WTA players.

In exchange for being the host nation, Australia was guaranteed one of the spots reserved for teams with the best combined ranking should they have failed to qualify on merit, though this was not needed as Australia qualified in the second combined ranking spot.

Teams featured three or four players from each tour.

== Venues ==
Brisbane, Perth and Sydney each hosted two groups of three countries in a round robin format and the host city finals in the first seven days of the tournament. Sydney hosted the semifinals and the final on the last four days of the tournament.

Image	Name	Opened	Capacity	Location	Events	Map
	Pat Rafter Arena	2009	5,500	Brisbane, Queensland	Group stage, Host city final	2023 United Cup is located in Australia
	RAC Arena	2012	15,500	Perth, Western Australia	Group stage, Host city final	2023 United Cup is located in Australia
	Ken Rosewall Arena	1999	10,500	Sydney, New South Wales	Group stage, Host city final, Semifinals, Final	2023 United Cup is located in Australia

== ATP / WTA ranking points ==
Round	Points per win vs. opponent ranked						
Round	No. 1–10	No. 11–20	No. 21–30	No. 31–50	No. 51–100	No. 101–250	No. 251+
Final	180	140	120	90	60	40	35
Semifinals	130	105	90	60	40	35	25
Host city finals	80	65	55	40	35	25	20
Group stage	55	45	40	35	25	20	15

- Maximum 500 points

== Entrants ==
The main doubles and their alternates were announced on 9 November 2022.

No.	Nation	Crit.	No. 1 ATP	Rank	No. 1 WTA	Rank	No. 2 ATP	No. 2 WTA	No. 3 ATP	No. 3 WTA	Doubles ATP	Doubles WTA	Captain(s)	Nat.
1	Greece	ATP #3	Stefanos Tsitsipas	4	Maria Sakkari	6	Michail Pervolarakis	Despina Papamichail	Stefanos Sakellaridis	Valentini Grammatikopoulou	Petros Tsitsipas	Sapfo Sakellaridi	Petros Tsitsipas	(Greece)
2	Poland	WTA #1	Hubert Hurkacz	11	Iga Świątek	1	Daniel Michalski	Magda Linette	Kacper Żuk	Weronika Falkowska	Łukasz Kubot	Alicja Rosolska	Agnieszka Radwańska / Dawid Celt	(Poland)
3	United States	WTA #2	Taylor Fritz	9	Jessica Pegula	3	Frances Tiafoe	Madison Keys	Denis Kudla	Alycia Parks	Hunter Reese	Desirae Krawczyk	David Witt	(United States)
4	Spain	ATP #1	Rafael Nadal	2	Paula Badosa	13	Pablo Carreño Busta	Nuria Párrizas Díaz	Albert Ramos Viñolas	Jéssica Bouzas Maneiro	David Vega Hernández	—	Marc López	(Spain)
5	Italy	Comb #1	Matteo Berrettini	16	Martina Trevisan	28	Lorenzo Musetti	Lucia Bronzetti	Andrea Vavassori	Camilla Rosatello	Marco Bortolotti	—	Vincenzo Santopadre	(Italy)
6	France	WTA #3	Arthur Rinderknech	44	Caroline Garcia	4	Adrian Mannarino	Alizé Cornet	Manuel Guinard	Léolia Jeanjean	Édouard Roger-Vasselin	Jessika Ponchet	Édouard Roger-Vasselin	(France)
7	Australia	Comb #2	Alex de Minaur	24	Ajla Tomljanović	33	Jason Kubler	Zoe Hives	—	Maddison Inglis	John Peers	Samantha Stosur	Lleyton Hewitt / Samantha Stosur	(Australia)
8	Croatia	Comb #4	Borna Ćorić	26	Petra Martić	39	Borna Gojo	Donna Vekić	Matija Pecotić	Tara Würth	—	Petra Marčinko (Note: WTA Singles 4 instead of WTA Doubles)	Iva Majoli	(Croatia)
9	Switzerland	WTA #4	Stan Wawrinka	22^{PR(150)}	Belinda Bencic	12	Marc-Andrea Hüsler	Jil Teichmann	Dominic Stricker	Ylena In-Albon	Alexander Ritschard (Note: ATP Singles 4 instead of ATP Doubles)	Joanne Züger	Stan Wawrinka	(Switzerland)
10	Germany	ATP #3	Alexander Zverev	2^{PR(12)}	Laura Siegemund	57^{PR(169)}	Oscar Otte	Jule Niemeier	Daniel Altmaier	Anna-Lena Friedsam	Fabian Fallert	Julia Lohoff	Mischa Zverev	(Germany)
11	Brazil	WTA #5	Thiago Monteiro	65	Beatriz Haddad Maia	15	Felipe Meligeni Alves	Laura Pigossi	Matheus Pucinelli de Almeida	Carolina Alves	Rafael Matos	Luisa Stefani	Rafael Paciaroni	(Brazil)
12	Belgium	Comb #5	David Goffin	53	Elise Mertens	29	Zizou Bergs	Alison Van Uytvanck	Kimmer Coppejans	Magali Kempen	Michael Geerts	Kirsten Flipkens	Kirsten Flipkens	(Belgium)
13	Czech Republic	WTA #6	Jiří Lehečka	74	Petra Kvitová	16	Tomáš Macháč	Marie Bouzková	Dalibor Svrčina	Jesika Malečková	—	—	Jiří Vaněk	(Czech Republic)
14	Great Britain	ATP #5	Cameron Norrie	14	Harriet Dart	98	Dan Evans	Katie Swan	Jan Choinski	Ranah Stoiber	Jonny O'Mara	Ella McDonald	Tim Henman	(United Kingdom)
15	Argentina	Comb #3	Francisco Cerúndolo	30	Nadia Podoroska	39^{PR(204)}	Federico Coria	María Carlé	Tomás Martín Etcheverry	Paula Ormaechea	—	—	Gisela Dulko	(Argentina)
16	Norway	ATP #4	Casper Ruud	3	Malene Helgø	319	Viktor Durasovic	Ulrikke Eikeri	Andreja Petrovic	Lilly Håseth	—	—	Christian Ruud	(Norway)
17	Bulgaria	ATP #6	Grigor Dimitrov	28	Viktoriya Tomova	90	Dimitar Kuzmanov	Isabella Shinikova	Adrian Andreev	Gergana Topalova	Alexandar Lazarov	—	Grigor Dimitrov	(Bulgaria)
18	Kazakhstan	Comb #6	Alexander Bublik	37	Yulia Putintseva	52	Timofey Skatov	Zhibek Kulambayeva	Denis Yevseyev	Gozal Ainitdinova	Grigoriy Lomakin	—	Alexander Bublik	(Kazakhstan)

- Rankings are as of 29 December 2022.
- PR = Protected ranking

== Group stage ==
The 18 teams were divided into six groups of three teams each in a round-robin format. The winners of each group qualified for the host city finals.

Qualified for the knockout stage (**in bold**)
Eliminated (in italics)

=== Overview ===
T = Ties, M = Matches, S = Sets

Group	First place				Second place				Third place			
Group	Country	T	M	S	Country	T	M	S	Country	T	M	S
A	Greece	2–0	8–2	17–7	Bulgaria	1–1	4–6	12–13	Belgium	0–2	3–7	8–17
B	Poland	2–0	7–3	14–8	Switzerland	1–1	7–3	15–7	Kazakhstan	0–2	1–9	4–18
C	United States	2–0	9–1	18–4	Czech Republic	1–1	4–6	9–12	Germany	0–2	2–8	5–16
D	Great Britain	2–0	7–3	15–10	Australia	1–1	5–5	10–12	Spain	0–2	3–7	12–15
E	Italy	2–0	8–2	17–5	Brazil	1–1	6–4	12–9	Norway	0–2	1–9	3–18
F	Croatia	2–0	8–2	16–7	France	1–1	7–3	15–6	Argentina	0–2	0–10	2–20

=== Group A ===
Host city: Perth

Pos.	Country	Ties	Matches	Sets	Sets %	Games	Games %
1	**Greece**	2–0	8–2	17–7	71%	126–92	58%
2	Bulgaria	1–1	4–6	12–13	48%	104–111	48%
3	Belgium	0–2	3–7	8–17	32%	95–122	44%

==== Greece vs. Bulgaria ====
Greece
4
RAC Arena
29–30 December 2022

Bulgaria
1

			1	2	3
1	(Greece) (Bulgaria)	**Despina Papamichail**; Isabella Shinikova	3; **6**	**6**; 4	**6**; 1
2	(Greece) (Bulgaria)	**Stefanos Tsitsipas**; Grigor Dimitrov	4; **6**	**6**; 2	**7^{7}** 6^{4}
3	(Greece) (Bulgaria)	**Maria Sakkari**; Viktoriya Tomova	**6**; 3	**6**; 2
4	(Greece) (Bulgaria)	Michail Pervolarakis; **Dimitar Kuzmanov**	1; **6**	1; **6**
5	(Greece) (Bulgaria)	**Maria Sakkari / Stefanos Tsitsipas**; Gergana Topalova / Adrian Andreev	**6**; 4	**6**; 4

==== Belgium vs. Bulgaria ====
Belgium
2
RAC Arena
31 Dec 2022–1 Jan 2023

Bulgaria
3

			1	2	3
1	(Belgium) (Bulgaria)	**Alison Van Uytvanck**; Isabella Shinikova	**6**; 1	3; **6**	**6**; 3
2	(Belgium) (Bulgaria)	David Goffin; **Grigor Dimitrov**	4; **6**	5; **7**
3	(Belgium) (Bulgaria)	**Elise Mertens**; Gergana Topalova	**6**; 4	3; **6**	**6**; 0
4	(Belgium) (Bulgaria)	Zizou Bergs; **Dimitar Kuzmanov**	2; **6**	0; **6**
5	(Belgium) (Bulgaria)	Elise Mertens / David Goffin; **Isabella Shinikova / Alexandar Lazarov**	**6**; 1	6^{5} **7^{7}**	6; **10**

==== Greece vs. Belgium ====
Greece
4
RAC Arena
2–3 January 2023

Belgium
1

			1	2	3
1	(Greece) (Belgium)	Despina Papamichail; **Alison Van Uytvanck**	5; **7**	**6**; 2	3; **6**
2	(Greece) (Belgium)	**Stefanos Tsitsipas**; David Goffin	**6**; 3	**6**; 2
3	(Greece) (Belgium)	**Maria Sakkari**; Elise Mertens	**6**; 1	**7**; 5
4	(Greece) (Belgium)	**Stefanos Sakellaridis**; Zizou Bergs	5; **7**	**6**; 1	**6**; 3
5	(Greece) (Belgium)	**Maria Sakkari / Stefanos Tsitsipas**; Kirsten Flipkens / Michael Geerts	**6**; 3	**6**; 2

=== Group B ===
Host city: Brisbane

Pos.	Country	Ties	Matches	Sets	Sets %	Games	Games %
1	**Poland**	2–0	7–3	14–8	64%	116–98	54%
2	Switzerland	1–1	7–3	15–7	68%	123–99	55%
3	Kazakhstan	0–2	1–9	4–18	18%	86–128	40%

==== Switzerland vs. Kazakhstan ====
Switzerland
5
Pat Rafter Arena
29–30 December 2022

Kazakhstan
0

			1	2	3
1	(Switzerland) (Kazakhstan)	**Belinda Bencic**; Yulia Putintseva	**7^{7}** 6^{0}	**6**; 3
2	(Switzerland) (Kazakhstan)	**Marc-Andrea Hüsler**; Timofey Skatov	4; **6**	**6**; 3	**6**; 3
3	(Switzerland) (Kazakhstan)	**Stan Wawrinka**; Alexander Bublik	**6**; 3	**7^{7}** 6^{3}
4	(Switzerland) (Kazakhstan)	**Jil Teichmann**; Zhibek Kulambayeva	**6**; 3	**6**; 2
5	(Switzerland) (Kazakhstan)	**Jil Teichmann / Marc-Andrea Hüsler**; Zhibek Kulambayeva / Alexander Bublik	**7^{9}** 6^{7}	**6**; 3

==== Poland vs. Kazakhstan ====
Poland
4
Pat Rafter Arena
31 Dec 2022–1 Jan 2023

Kazakhstan
1

			1	2	3
1	(Poland) (Kazakhstan)	**Iga Świątek**; Yulia Putintseva	**6**; 1	**6**; 3
2	(Poland) (Kazakhstan)	Daniel Michalski; **Timofey Skatov**	6^{7} **7^{9}**	2; **6**
3	(Poland) (Kazakhstan)	**Hubert Hurkacz**; Alexander Bublik	**7^{10}** 6^{8}	4; **6**	**6**; 3
4	(Poland) (Kazakhstan)	**Magda Linette**; Zhibek Kulambayeva	**6**; 2	**6**; 1
5	(Poland) (Kazakhstan)	**Iga Świątek / Hubert Hurkacz**; Zhibek Kulambayeva / Grigoriy Lomakin	**6**; 3	**6**; 4

==== Poland vs. Switzerland ====
Poland
3
Pat Rafter Arena
2–3 January 2023

Switzerland
2

			1	2	3
1	(Poland) (Switzerland)	**Iga Świątek**; Belinda Bencic	**6**; 3	**7^{7}** 6^{3}
2	(Poland) (Switzerland)	Daniel Michalski; **Marc-Andrea Hüsler**	3; **6**	2; **6**
3	(Poland) (Switzerland)	**Hubert Hurkacz**; Stan Wawrinka	**7^{7}** 6^{5}	**6**; 4
4	(Poland) (Switzerland)	**Magda Linette**; Jil Teichmann	5; **7**	**6**; 4	**6**; 1
5	(Poland) (Switzerland)	Alicja Rosolska / Kacper Żuk; **Belinda Bencic / Marc-Andrea Hüsler**	5; **7**	2; **6**

=== Group C ===
Host city: Sydney

Pos.	Country	Ties	Matches	Sets	Sets %	Games	Games %
1	**United States**	2–0	9–1	18–4	82%	105–71	60%
2	Czech Republic	1–1	4–6	9–12	43%	91–88	51%
3	Germany	0–2	2–8	5–16	24%	80–117	41%

==== United States vs. Czech Republic ====
United States
4
Ken Rosewall Arena
29–30 December 2022

Czech Republic
1

			1	2	3
1	(United States) (Czech Republic)	**Taylor Fritz**; Jiří Lehečka	**6**; 3	**6**; 4
2	(United States) (Czech Republic)	**Madison Keys**; Marie Bouzková	**6**; 4	**6**; 3
3	(United States) (Czech Republic)	Jessica Pegula; **Petra Kvitová**	6^{6} **7^{8}**	4; **6**
4	(United States) (Czech Republic)	**Frances Tiafoe**; Tomáš Macháč	**6**; 3	2; **4**		**retired**
5	(United States) (Czech Republic)	**Jessica Pegula / Taylor Fritz**; Marie Bouzková / Jiří Lehečka	2; **6**	**6**; 3	**10**; 7

Note: By United Cup rules a retired match counts as a straight-set win or loss, but not into percentage of games.

==== Germany vs. Czech Republic ====
Germany
2
Ken Rosewall Arena
31 Dec 2022–1 Jan 2023

Czech Republic
3

			1	2	3
1	(Germany) (Czech Republic)	Alexander Zverev; **Jiří Lehečka**	4; **6**	2; **6**
2	(Germany) (Czech Republic)	Jule Niemeier; **Marie Bouzková**	2; **6**	5; **7**
3	(Germany) (Czech Republic)	Laura Siegemund; **Petra Kvitová**	4; **6**	2; **6**
4	(Germany) (Czech Republic)	**Oscar Otte**; Dalibor Svrčina	**7^{7}** 6^{1}	**6**; 2
5	(Germany) (Czech Republic)	**Laura Siegemund / Alexander Zverev**; Marie Bouzková / Jiří Lehečka	**6**; 4	**7^{7}** 6^{1}

==== United States vs. Germany ====
United States
5
Ken Rosewall Arena
2–3 January 2023

Germany
0

			1	2	3
1	(United States) (Germany)	**Taylor Fritz**; Alexander Zverev	**6**; 1	**6**; 4
2	(United States) (Germany)	**Madison Keys**; Jule Niemeier	**6**; 2	**6**; 3
3	(United States) (Germany)	**Jessica Pegula**; Laura Siegemund	**6**; 3	**6**; 2
4	(United States) (Germany)	**Frances Tiafoe**; Oscar Otte	**7**; 5	**6**; 4
5	(United States) (Germany)	**Jessica Pegula / Frances Tiafoe**; Laura Siegemund / Daniel Altmaier	6^{5} **7^{7}**	**6**; 4	**10**; 7

=== Group D ===
Host city: Sydney

Pos.	Country	Ties	Matches	Sets	Sets %	Games	Games %
1	**Great Britain**	2–0	7–3	15–10	60%	122–108	53%
2	Australia	1–1	5–5	10–12	45%	99–108	48%
3	Spain	0–2	3–7	12–15	44%	114–119	49%

==== Australia vs. Great Britain ====
Australia
2
Ken Rosewall Arena
29–30 December 2022

Great Britain
3

			1	2	3
1	(Australia) (United Kingdom)	Alex de Minaur; **Cameron Norrie**	3; **6**	3; **6**
2	(Australia) (United Kingdom)	Zoe Hives; **Katie Swan**	4; **6**	3; **6**
3	(Australia) (United Kingdom)	Maddison Inglis; **Harriet Dart**	4; **6**	4; **6**
4	(Australia) (United Kingdom)	**Jason Kubler**; Dan Evans	**6**; 3	**7^{7}** 6^{3}
5	(Australia) (United Kingdom)	**Samantha Stosur / John Peers**; Harriet Dart / Jonny O'Mara	**7^{7}** 6^{4}	**6**; 4

==== Spain vs. Great Britain ====
Spain
1
Ken Rosewall Arena
31 Dec 2022–1 Jan 2023

Great Britain
4

			1	2	3
1	(Spain) (United Kingdom)	Rafael Nadal; **Cameron Norrie**	**6**; 3	3; **6**	4; **6**
2	(Spain) (United Kingdom)	Nuria Párrizas Díaz; **Katie Swan**	**6**; 3	1; **6**	2; **6**
3	(Spain) (United Kingdom)	**Paula Badosa**; Harriet Dart	6^{6} **7^{8}**	**7^{7}** 6^{5}	**6**; 1
4	(Spain) (United Kingdom)	Albert Ramos Viñolas; **Dan Evans**	3; **6**	**6**; 1	3; **6**
5	(Spain) (United Kingdom)	Jéssica Bouzas Maneiro / David Vega Hernández; **Harriet Dart / Jonny O'Mara**	**6**; 3	2; **6**	5; **10**

==== Spain vs. Australia ====
Spain
2
Ken Rosewall Arena
2–3 January 2023

Australia
3

			1	2	3
1	(Spain) (Australia)	Rafael Nadal; **Alex de Minaur**	**6**; 3	1; **6**	5; **7**
2	(Spain) (Australia)	**Nuria Párrizas Díaz**; Maddison Inglis	**6**; 1	**6**; 3
3	(Spain) (Australia)	**Jéssica Bouzas Maneiro**; Olivia Gadecki	**6**; 2	**6**; 2
4	(Spain) (Australia)	Albert Ramos Viñolas; **Jason Kubler**	3; **6**	**6**; 4	3; **6**
5	(Spain) (Australia)	Jéssica Bouzas Maneiro / David Vega Hernandez; **Samantha Stosur / John Peers**	2; **6**	3; **6**

=== Group E ===
Host city: Brisbane

Pos.	Country	Ties	Matches	Sets	Sets %	Games	Games %
1	**Italy**	2–0	8–2	17–5	77%	117–91	56%
2	Brazil	1–1	6–4	12–9	57%	98–90	52%
3	Norway	0–2	1–9	3–18	14%	87–121	42%

==== Italy vs. Brazil ====
Italy
3
Pat Rafter Arena
29–30 December 2022

Brazil
2

			1	2	3
1	(Italy) (Brazil)	Martina Trevisan; **Beatriz Haddad Maia**	2; **6**	0; **6**
2	(Italy) (Brazil)	**Lorenzo Musetti**; Felipe Meligeni Alves	**6**; 3	**6**; 4
3	(Italy) (Brazil)	**Matteo Berrettini**; Thiago Monteiro	**6**; 4	**7^{9}** 6^{7}
4	(Italy) (Brazil)	**Lucia Bronzetti**; Laura Pigossi	**6**; 0	**6**; 2
5	(Italy) (Brazil)	Camilla Rosatello / Matteo Berrettini; **Luisa Stefani / Rafael Matos**	4; **6**	**7^{7}** 6^{4}	4; **10**

==== Brazil vs. Norway ====
Brazil
4
Pat Rafter Arena
31 Dec 2022–1 Jan 2023

Norway
1

			1	2	3
1	(Brazil) (Norway)	**Beatriz Haddad Maia**; Malene Helgø	**6**; 4	**6**; 2
2	(Brazil) (Norway)	**Felipe Meligeni Alves**; Viktor Durasovic	**6**; 3	**6**; 3
3	(Brazil) (Norway)	Thiago Monteiro; **Casper Ruud**	3; **6**	2; **6**
4	(Brazil) (Norway)	**Laura Pigossi**; Ulrikke Eikeri	**6**; 3	**6**; 4
5	(Brazil) (Norway)	**Luisa Stefani / Rafael Matos**; Ulrikke Eikeri / Viktor Durasovic	**6**; 4	**7**; 5

==== Italy vs. Norway ====
Italy
5
Pat Rafter Arena
2–3 January 2023

Norway
0

			1	2	3
1	(Italy) (Norway)	**Martina Trevisan**; Malene Helgø	**7**; 5	3; **6**	**6**; 4
2	(Italy) (Norway)	**Lorenzo Musetti**; Viktor Durasovic	**7^{9}** 6^{7}	**6**; 3
3	(Italy) (Norway)	**Matteo Berrettini**; Casper Ruud	**6**; 4	**6**; 4
4	(Italy) (Norway)	**Lucia Bronzetti**; Ulrikke Eikeri	**6**; 2	**7**; 5
5	(Italy) (Norway)	**Camilla Rosatello / Lorenzo Musetti**; Ulrikke Eikeri / Viktor Durasovic	**7^{8}** 6^{6}	**6**; 2

=== Group F ===
Host city: Perth

Pos.	Country	Ties	Matches	Sets	Sets %	Games	Games %
1	**Croatia**	2–0	8–2	16–7	70%	123–104	54%
2	France	1–1	7–3	15–6	71%	122–79	61%
3	Argentina	0–2	0–10	2–20	9%	60–122	33%

==== France vs. Argentina ====
France
5
RAC Arena
29–30 December 2022

Argentina
0

			1	2	3
1	(France) (Argentina)	**Alizé Cornet**; María Carlé	**6**; 2	**6**; 1
2	(France) (Argentina)	**Arthur Rinderknech**; Francisco Cerúndolo	**6**; 4	**6**; 2
3	(France) (Argentina)	**Caroline Garcia**; Nadia Podoroska	**6**; 2	**6**; 0
4	(France) (Argentina)	**Adrian Mannarino**; Federico Coria	**6**; 1	**6**; 0
5	(France) (Argentina)	**Caroline Garcia / Édouard Roger-Vasselin**; Nadia Podoroska / Tomás Martín Etcheverry	**6**; 2	**6**; 4

==== Croatia vs. Argentina ====
Croatia
5
RAC Arena
31 Dec 2022–1 Jan 2023

Argentina
0

			1	2	3
1	(Croatia) (Argentina)	**Donna Vekić**; María Carlé	**6**; 0	**6**; 4
2	(Croatia) (Argentina)	**Borna Ćorić**; Francisco Cerúndolo	**7**; 5	**6**; 4
3	(Croatia) (Argentina)	**Petra Martić**; Nadia Podoroska	**6**; 2	4; **6**	**6**; 1
4	(Croatia) (Argentina)	**Borna Gojo**; Federico Coria	**7^{7}** 6^{5}	**6**; 4
5	(Croatia) (Argentina)	**Tara Würth / Borna Gojo**; Nadia Podoroska / Tomás Martín Etcheverry	1; **6**	**6**; 4	**10**; 4

==== France vs. Croatia ====
France
2
RAC Arena
2–3 January 2023

Croatia
3

			1	2	3
1	(France) (Croatia)	Alizé Cornet; **Donna Vekić**	4; **6**	3; **6**
2	(France) (Croatia)	Arthur Rinderknech; **Borna Ćorić**	6^{1} **7^{7}**	6^{2} **7^{7}**
3	(France) (Croatia)	**Caroline Garcia**; Petra Martić	**7^{11}** 6^{9}	**6**; 4
4	(France) (Croatia)	Adrian Mannarino; **Borna Gojo**	6^{5} **7^{7}**	**6**; 3	6^{5} **7^{7}**
5	(France) (Croatia)	**Jessika Ponchet / Édouard Roger-Vasselin**; Petra Marčinko / Matija Pecotić	**6**; 4	**6**; 4

== Knockout stage ==
=== Host city finals ===
Host city	Tie	Score
Perth	**Greece** def. Croatia	**3**–2
Brisbane	**Poland** def. Italy	**3**–2
Sydney	**United States** def. Great Britain	**4**–1

- The three winners advanced to the semifinals along with a losing host city finalist with the best record from its three ties.

Qualified for the semifinals (**in bold**)
Eliminated (in italics)

Ranking of teams losing in the host city finals

Pos.	Country	Ties	Matches	Sets	Sets %	Games	Games %
1	**Italy**	2–1	10–5	21–12	64%	156–142	52%
2	Croatia	2–1	10–5	21–13	62%	175–156	53%
3	Great Britain	2–1	8–7	19–19	50%	176–177	50%

==== Greece vs. Croatia ====
Greece
3
Perth, RAC Arena
4 January 2023

Croatia
2

			1	2	3
1	(Greece) (Croatia)	Despina Papamichail; **Donna Vekić**	2; **6**	0; **6**
2	(Greece) (Croatia)	**Stefanos Tsitsipas**; Borna Ćorić	**6**; 0	6^{4} **7^{7}**	**7**; 5
3	(Greece) (Croatia)	**Maria Sakkari**; Petra Martić	**6**; 3	**6**; 3
4	(Greece) (Croatia)	Stefanos Sakellaridis; **Borna Gojo**	4; **6**	2; **6**
5	(Greece) (Croatia)	**Maria Sakkari / Stefanos Tsitsipas**; Petra Martić / Borna Gojo	**7^{8}** 6^{6}	**6**; 4

==== Poland vs. Italy ====
Poland
3
Brisbane, Pat Rafter Arena
4 January 2023

Italy
2

			1	2	3
1	(Poland) (Italy)	Daniel Michalski; **Lorenzo Musetti**	1; **6**	1; **6**
2	(Poland) (Italy)	**Iga Świątek**; Martina Trevisan	**6**; 2	**6**; 4
3	(Poland) (Italy)	Hubert Hurkacz; **Matteo Berrettini**	4; **6**	**6**; 3	3; **6**
4	(Poland) (Italy)	**Magda Linette**; Lucia Bronzetti	**6**; 1	**6**; 2
5	(Poland) (Italy)	**Iga Świątek / Hubert Hurkacz**; Camilla Rosatello / Lorenzo Musetti	**6**; 1	**6**; 2

==== United States vs. Great Britain ====
United States
4
Sydney, Ken Rosewall Arena
4 January 2023

Great Britain
1

			1	2	3
1	(United States) (United Kingdom)	**Madison Keys**; Katie Swan	2; **6**	**6**; 3	**6**; 4
2	(United States) (United Kingdom)	Taylor Fritz; **Cameron Norrie**	4; **6**	**7**; 5	4; **6**
3	(United States) (United Kingdom)	**Jessica Pegula**; Harriet Dart	**6**; 2	**6**; 0
4	(United States) (United Kingdom)	**Frances Tiafoe**; Dan Evans	3; **6**	**7**; 5	**6**; 3
5	(United States) (United Kingdom)	**Jessica Pegula / Taylor Fritz**; Harriet Dart / Dan Evans	**6**; 4	**6**; 4

=== Bracket ===
Semifinals
Poland	0
**United States**	**5**
Greece	1
**Italy**	**4**

Final
**United States**	**4**
Italy	0

=== Semifinals ===
==== Poland vs. United States ====
Poland
0
Sydney, Ken Rosewall Arena
6–7 January 2023

United States
5

			1	2	3
1	(Poland) (United States)	Iga Świątek; **Jessica Pegula**	2; **6**	2; **6**
2	(Poland) (United States)	Kacper Żuk; **Frances Tiafoe**	3; **6**	3; **6**
3	(Poland) (United States)	Hubert Hurkacz; **Taylor Fritz**	6^{5} **7^{7}**	6^{5} **7^{7}**
4	(Poland) (United States)	Magda Linette; **Madison Keys**	4; **6**	2; **6**
5	(Poland) (United States)	Alicja Rosolska / Łukasz Kubot; **Jessica Pegula / Taylor Fritz**	**7^{7}** 6^{5}	4; **6**	6; **10**

==== Greece vs. Italy ====
Greece
1
Sydney, Ken Rosewall Arena
6–7 January 2023

Italy
4

			1	2	3
1	(Greece) (Italy)	Maria Sakkari; **Martina Trevisan**	3; **6**	**7^{7}** 6^{4}	5; **7**
2	(Greece) (Italy)	Stefanos Sakellaridis; **Lorenzo Musetti**	1; **6**	1; **6**
3	(Greece) (Italy)	**Stefanos Tsitsipas**; Matteo Berrettini	4; **6**	**7^{7}** 6^{2}	**6**; 4
4	(Greece) (Italy)	Valentini Grammatikopoulou; **Lucia Bronzetti**	2; **6**	3; **6**
5	(Greece) (Italy)	Valentini Grammatikopoulou / Petros Tsitsipas; **Camilla Rosatello / Andrea Vavassori**	3; **6**	**6**; 4	5; **10**

=== Final ===
==== United States vs. Italy ====
United States
4
Sydney, Ken Rosewall Arena
8 January 2023

Italy
0

			1	2	3
1	(United States) (Italy)	**Jessica Pegula**; Martina Trevisan	**6**; 4	**6**; 2
2	(United States) (Italy)	**Frances Tiafoe**; Lorenzo Musetti	**6**; 2	**0**; 0		**retired**
3	(United States) (Italy)	**Taylor Fritz**; Matteo Berrettini	**7^{7}** 6^{4}	**7^{8}** 6^{6}
4	(United States) (Italy)	**Madison Keys**; Lucia Bronzetti	**6**; 3	**6**; 2
5	(United States) (Italy)	Jessica Pegula / Taylor Fritz; Martina Trevisan / Matteo Berrettini				**not** **played**
