= 2018 J&T Banka Prague Open =

- Date: 30 April – 5 May
- Edition: 9th
- Category: WTA International
- Draw: 32S / 16D
- Prize money: $250,000
- Surface: Clay
- Location: Prague, Czech Republic
- Venue: TK Sparta Prague

Champions

Singles
- (Czech Republic) Petra Kvitová

Doubles
- (United States) Nicole Melichar / (Czech Republic) Květa Peschke
- J&T Banka Prague Open

The 2018 J&T Banka Prague Open was a professional tennis tournaments played on outdoor clay courts. It was the ninth edition of the tournament, and part of the International category of the 2018 WTA Tour. It took place at the TK Sparta Prague in Prague, Czech Republic, from 30 April to 5 May 2018. Second-seeded Petra Kvitová won the singles title.

== Finals ==
=== Singles ===
- (Czech Republic) Petra Kvitová defeated (Romania) Mihaela Buzărnescu, 4–6, 6–2, 6–3.

This was Kvitova's 23rd WTA title and first on home soil. It was also her third title of the year and first International since Linz 2011.

=== Doubles ===
- (United States) Nicole Melichar / (Czech Republic) Květa Peschke defeated (Romania) Mihaela Buzărnescu / (Belarus) Lidziya Marozava, 6–4, 6–2

== Points and prize money ==
Event	W	F	SF	QF	Round of 16	Round of 32	Q	Q3	Q2	Q1
Singles	280	180	110	60	30	1	18	14	10	1
Doubles	280	180	110	60	1	—N/a	—N/a	—N/a	—N/a	—N/a

=== Prize money ===
Event	W	F	SF	QF	Round of 16	Round of 32	Q3	Q2	Q1
Singles	$43,000	$21,400	$11,300	$5,900	$3,310	$1,925	$1,005	$730	$530
Doubles	$12,300	$6,400	$3,435	$1,820	$960	—N/a	—N/a	—N/a	—N/a

== Singles main draw entrants ==
=== Seeds ===
Country	Player	Rank^{1}	Seed
~~CZE~~	~~Karolína Plíšková~~	~~6~~	~~1~~
CZE	Petra Kvitová	10	2
RUS	Daria Kasatkina	14	3
AUS	Daria Gavrilova	24	4
CZE	Barbora Strýcová	26	5
CHN	Zhang Shuai	30	6
ROU	Mihaela Buzărnescu	39	7
CZE	Kateřina Siniaková	51	8
BLR	Aliaksandra Sasnovich	55	9

- Rankings are as of April 23, 2018.

=== Other entrants ===
The following players received wildcards into the singles main draw:

- (Russia) Daria Kasatkina
- (Slovakia) Anna Karolína Schmiedlová
- (Czech Republic) Tereza Smitková

The following players received entry from the qualifying draw:

- (Germany) Antonia Lottner
- (Romania) Elena-Gabriela Ruse
- (Switzerland) Patty Schnyder
- (Switzerland) Stefanie Vögele

The following players received entry as lucky losers:

- (Germany) Tamara Korpatsch
- (Italy) Jasmine Paolini

=== Withdrawals ===
- (Switzerland) Belinda Bencic → replaced by (France) Océane Dodin
- (United States) Varvara Lepchenko → replaced by (United States) Bernarda Pera
- (Czech Republic) Karolína Plíšková → replaced by (Italy) Jasmine Paolini
- (Czech Republic) Lucie Šafářová → replaced by (Czech Republic) Denisa Allertová
- (Croatia) Donna Vekić → replaced by (Netherlands) Richèl Hogenkamp
- (Czech Republic) Markéta Vondroušová → replaced by (Germany) Tamara Korpatsch

=== Retirements ===
- (Australia) Daria Gavrilova

== Doubles main draw entrants ==
=== Seeds ===
Country	Player	Country	Player	Rank^{1}	Seed
CZE	Andrea Sestini Hlaváčková	CZE	Renata Voráčová	39	1
~~USA~~	~~Raquel Atawo~~	~~GER~~	~~Anna-Lena Grönefeld~~	~~59~~	~~2~~
USA	Nicole Melichar	CZE	Květa Peschke	60	3
JPN	Shuko Aoyama	JPN	Miyu Kato	86	4
RUS	Veronika Kudermetova	UKR	Olga Savchuk	107	5

- ^{1} Rankings as of April 23, 2018.

=== Other entrants ===
The following pairs received wildcards into the doubles main draw:

- (Slovakia) Viktória Kužmová / (Romania) Elena-Gabriela Ruse
- (Czech Republic) Barbora Štefková / (Czech Republic) Barbora Strýcová

The following pair received entry as alternates:

- (Japan) Misaki Doi / (Sweden) Cornelia Lister

=== Withdrawals ===
Before the tournament

- (United States) Raquel Atawo (abductor injury)

During the tournament

- (Czech Republic) Barbora Strýcová
