= 2018 J&T Banka Prague Open – Singles =

Singles
- 2018 J&T Banka Prague Open

Final
- Champion: (Czech Republic) Petra Kvitová
- Runner-up: (Romania) Mihaela Buzărnescu
- Score: 4–6, 6–2, 6–3

Details
- Draw: 32
- Seeds: 8

Events
Singles	Doubles
- J&T Banka Prague Open

Mona Barthel was the defending champion, but lost in the first round to Antonia Lottner.

Second-seeded Petra Kvitová won the title, defeating Mihaela Buzărnescu in the final, 4–6, 6–2, 6–3.

== Seeds ==
1. (Czech Republic) Karolína Plíšková (withdrew)
2. (Czech Republic) Petra Kvitová (champion)
3. (Russia) Daria Kasatkina (first round)
4. (Australia) Daria Gavrilova (first round, retired)
5. (Czech Republic) Barbora Strýcová (first round)
6. (China) Zhang Shuai (semifinals)
7. (Romania) Mihaela Buzărnescu (final)
8. (Czech Republic) Kateřina Siniaková (quarterfinals)
9. (Belarus) Aliaksandra Sasnovich (first round)

== Draw ==
Key

- Q = Qualifier
- WC = Wild card
- LL = Lucky loser
- Alt = Alternate
- ITF = ITF entry
- PR = Protected ranking
- SR = Special ranking
- SE = Special exempt
- JE = Junior exempt
- JR = Junior Accelerator Programme entrant
- CO = College Accelerator Programme entrant
- NG = Next Gen Accelerator Program entrant
- w/o = Walkover
- r = Retired
- d = Defaulted

=== Finals ===
Semifinals
7	(Romania) Mihaela Buzărnescu	4	6	7
(Italy) Camila Giorgi	6	3	5
6	(China) Zhang Shuai	6^{6}	0
2	(Czech Republic) Petra Kvitová	7^{8}	6

Final
7	(Romania) Mihaela Buzărnescu	6	2	3
2	(Czech Republic) Petra Kvitová	4	6	6

=== Top half ===
First round
9	(Belarus) A Sasnovich	6^{5}	3
(Czech Republic) Kr Plíšková	7^{7}	6
(Slovakia) V Kužmová	6^{4}	1
(China) Q Wang	7^{7}	6
(Germany) M Barthel	0	5
Q	(Germany) A Lottner	6	7
(Brazil) B Haddad Maia	1	5
7	(Romania) M Buzărnescu	6	7
4	(Australia) D Gavrilova	3	6	0^{r}
(Australia) S Stosur	6	4	0
(Czech Republic) D Allertová	6	6
Q	(Switzerland) P Schnyder	4	4
LL	(Germany) T Korpatsch	6	7
(France) O Dodin	2	5
(Italy) C Giorgi	6	2	6
5	(Czech Republic) B Strýcová	0	6	2

Second round
(Czech Republic) Kr Plíšková	6	7^{7}
(China) Q Wang	2	6^{3}
Q	(Germany) A Lottner	0	6^{7}
7	(Romania) M Buzărnescu	6	7^{9}
(Australia) S Stosur	6	6
(Czech Republic) D Allertová	4	4
LL	(Germany) T Korpatsch	4	2
(Italy) C Giorgi	6	6

Quarterfinals
(Czech Republic) Kr Plíšková	2	3
7	(Romania) M Buzărnescu	6	6
(Australia) S Stosur	2	3
(Italy) C Giorgi	6	6

Semifinals
7	(Romania) M Buzărnescu	4	6	7
(Italy) C Giorgi	6	3	5

=== Bottom half ===
First round
6	(China) S Zhang	6	7
Q	(Switzerland) S Vögele	4	5
Q	(Romania) E-G Ruse	2	6	7
(United States) B Pera	6	1	5
(United Kingdom) H Watson	1	3
WC	(Slovakia) AK Schmiedlová	6	6
LL	(Italy) J Paolini	7^{8}	6
3/WC	(Russia) D Kasatkina	6^{6}	3
8	(Czech Republic) K Siniaková	6	7^{7}
(Germany) A Petkovic	2	6^{4}
(Russia) E Alexandrova	7^{7}	6
(Netherlands) R Hogenkamp	6^{5}	1
(Russia) N Vikhlyantseva	6	6
(Germany) C Witthöft	4	4
WC	(Czech Republic) T Smitková	1	3
2	(Czech Republic) P Kvitová	6	6

Second round
6	(China) S Zhang	6	6
Q	(Romania) E-G Ruse	4	4
WC	(Slovakia) AK Schmiedlová	4	1
LL	(Italy) J Paolini	6	6
8	(Czech Republic) K Siniaková	6	3	6
(Russia) E Alexandrova	4	6	3
(Russia) N Vikhlyantseva	3	1
2	(Czech Republic) P Kvitová	6	6

Quarterfinals
6	(China) S Zhang	6	6
LL	(Italy) J Paolini	4	3
8	(Czech Republic) K Siniaková	3	3
2	(Czech Republic) P Kvitová	6	6

Semifinals
6	(China) S Zhang	6^{6}	0
2	(Czech Republic) P Kvitová	7^{8}	6

== Qualifying ==
=== Seeds ===
1. (Switzerland) Stefanie Vögele (qualified)
2. (Japan) Miyu Kato (first round)
3. (Germany) Tamara Korpatsch (qualifying competition, lucky loser)
4. (Italy) Jasmine Paolini (qualifying competition, lucky loser)
5. (Russia) Anna Kalinskaya (first round, retired)
6. (Switzerland) Patty Schnyder (qualified)
7. (Germany) Antonia Lottner (qualified)
8. (Ukraine) Marta Kostyuk (first round)

=== Qualifiers ===
1. (Switzerland) Stefanie Vögele
2. (Romania) Elena-Gabriela Ruse
3. (Switzerland) Patty Schnyder
4. (Germany) Antonia Lottner

=== Lucky losers ===
1. (Germany) Tamara Korpatsch
2. (Italy) Jasmine Paolini

=== Draw ===
==== First qualifier ====
First round
1	(Switzerland) Stefanie Vögele	6	6
(Russia) Valentyna Ivakhnenko	0	2
(Latvia) Diāna Marcinkēviča	4	7	1
(Japan) Misaki Doi	6	5	6
PR	(Hungary) Réka Luca Jani	2	3
(Australia) Priscilla Hon	6	6
(Czech Republic) Anastasia Zarycká	3	6	1
5	(Russia) Anna Kalinskaya	6	2	0^{r}

Second round
1	(Switzerland) Stefanie Vögele	6	6
(Japan) Misaki Doi	4	2
(Australia) Priscilla Hon	4	4
(Czech Republic) Anastasia Zarycká	6	6

Qualifying competition
1	(Switzerland) Stefanie Vögele	6	6
(Czech Republic) Anastasia Zarycká	4	2

==== Second qualifier ====
First round
2	(Japan) Miyu Kato	4	2
(Czech Republic) Tereza Martincová	6	6
(Italy) Deborah Chiesa	5	6	6
WC	(Czech Republic) Miriam Kolodziejová	7	2	2
WC	(Czech Republic) Karolína Beránková	5	1
(Bulgaria) Viktoriya Tomova	7	6
(Romania) Elena-Gabriela Ruse	2	7	6
8	(Ukraine) Marta Kostyuk	6	5	3

Second round
(Czech Republic) Tereza Martincová	7	6
(Italy) Deborah Chiesa	5	3
(Bulgaria) Viktoriya Tomova	2	6^{6}
(Romania) Elena-Gabriela Ruse	6	7^{8}

Qualifying competition
(Czech Republic) Tereza Martincová	2	6^{2}
(Romania) Elena-Gabriela Ruse	6	7^{7}

==== Third qualifier ====
First round
3	(Germany) Tamara Korpatsch	6	2	6
(Slovakia) Michaela Hončová	3	6	3
(France) Tessah Andrianjafitrimo	3	2
PR	(Slovakia) Rebecca Šramková	6	6
WC	(Czech Republic) Aneta Kladivová	2	1
(Russia) Marina Melnikova	6	6
(Czech Republic) Marie Bouzková	2	1
6	(Switzerland) Patty Schnyder	6	6

Second round
3	(Germany) Tamara Korpatsch	6	3	6
PR	(Slovakia) Rebecca Šramková	4	6	4
(Russia) Marina Melnikova	3	5
6	(Switzerland) Patty Schnyder	6	7

Qualifying competition
3	(Germany) Tamara Korpatsch	1	5
6	(Switzerland) Patty Schnyder	6	7

==== Fourth qualifier ====
First round
4	(Italy) Jasmine Paolini	6	6
Alt	(Japan) Shuko Aoyama	1	3
(Slovakia) Chantal Škamlová	1	3
(Norway) Ulrikke Eikeri	6	6
(Czech Republic) Jesika Malečková	3	4
WC	(Czech Republic) Barbora Štefková	6	6
(Czech Republic) Petra Krejsová	4	3
7	(Germany) Antonia Lottner	6	6

Second round
4	(Italy) Jasmine Paolini	6	6
(Norway) Ulrikke Eikeri	3	0
WC	(Czech Republic) Barbora Štefková	2	0
7	(Germany) Antonia Lottner	6	6

Qualifying competition
4	(Italy) Jasmine Paolini	3	5
7	(Germany) Antonia Lottner	6	7
