= 2018 Grand Prix SAR La Princesse Lalla Meryem – Singles =

Singles
- 2018 Grand Prix SAR La Princesse Lalla Meryem

Final
- Champion: (Belgium) Elise Mertens
- Runner-up: (Australia) Ajla Tomljanović
- Score: 6–2, 7–6^{(7–4)}

Events
Singles	Doubles
- Grand Prix SAR La Princesse Lalla Meryem

Anastasia Pavlyuchenkova was the defending champion, but chose not to participate.

Elise Mertens won the title, defeating Ajla Tomljanović in the final, 6–2, 7–6^{(7–4)}.

== Seeds ==
1. (Belgium) Elise Mertens (champion)
2. (Slovakia) Dominika Cibulková (first round)
3. (Croatia) Petra Martić (first round)
4. (Hungary) Tímea Babos (first round)
5. (Switzerland) Timea Bacsinszky (withdrew)
6. (Kazakhstan) Zarina Diyas (first round)
7. (Serbia) Aleksandra Krunić (semifinals)
8. (Chinese Taipei) Hsieh Su-wei (semifinals)

== Draw ==
Key

- Q = Qualifier
- WC = Wild card
- LL = Lucky loser
- Alt = Alternate
- ITF = ITF entry
- PR = Protected ranking
- SR = Special ranking
- SE = Special exempt
- JE = Junior exempt
- JR = Junior Accelerator Programme entrant
- CO = College Accelerator Programme entrant
- NG = Next Gen Accelerator Program entrant
- w/o = Walkover
- r = Retired
- d = Defaulted

=== Finals ===
Semifinals
1	(Belgium) Elise Mertens	6	6
8	(Chinese Taipei) Hsieh Su-wei	0	2
(Australia) Ajla Tomljanović	7	6
7	(Serbia) Aleksandra Krunić	5	2

Final
1	(Belgium) Elise Mertens	6	7^{7}
(Australia) Ajla Tomljanović	2	6^{4}

=== Top half ===
First round
1	(Belgium) E Mertens	6	6
PR	(Slovakia) K Kučová	0	0
(Germany) L Siegemund	6	6
(Romania) A Bogdan	4	1
(Sweden) R Peterson	6	3	1
(Sweden) J Larsson	2	6	6
(Italy) S Errani	6	6
6	(Kazakhstan) Z Diyas	4	4
4	(Hungary) T Babos	6	6^{7}	5
LL	(Romania) A Dulgheru	2	7^{9}	7
WC	(Morocco) D El Jardi	2	3
WC	(Ukraine) K Zavatska	6	6
(Poland) M Linette	4	2
Q	(Slovenia) T Zidanšek	6	6
PR	(United States) B Mattek-Sands	6	6^{3}	1
8	(Chinese Taipei) S-w Hsieh	3	7^{7}	6

Second round
1	(Belgium) E Mertens	6^{5}	6	3
(Germany) L Siegemund	7^{7}	0	1^{r}
(Sweden) J Larsson	3	0
(Italy) S Errani	6	6
LL	(Romania) A Dulgheru	5	6	4
WC	(Ukraine) K Zavatska	7	2	6
Q	(Slovenia) T Zidanšek	7^{8}	3	3
8	(Chinese Taipei) S-w Hsieh	6^{6}	6	6

Quarterfinals
1	(Belgium) E Mertens	6	6
(Italy) S Errani	3	1
WC	(Ukraine) K Zavatska	1	1
8	(Chinese Taipei) S-w Hsieh	6	6

Semifinals
1	(Belgium) E Mertens	6	6
8	(Chinese Taipei) S-w Hsieh	0	2

=== Bottom half ===
First round
LL	(Poland) M Fręch	7	7
(United States) C McHale	5	5
(Croatia) J Fett	6	3	6
(United States) S Vickery	2	6	3
(Australia) A Tomljanović	6	3	6
Q	(Spain) S Soler Espinosa	2	6	1
(Belgium) K Flipkens	3	6	6
3	(Croatia) P Martić	6	2	4
7	(Serbia) A Krunić	6	6^{0}	6
(Spain) L Arruabarrena	2	7^{7}	2
(Kazakhstan) Y Putintseva	6^{4}	0
(Spain) S Sorribes Tormo	7^{7}	6
Q	(Spain) P Badosa Gibert	5	6	6
Q	(France) F Ferro	7	4	0
(Slovenia) P Hercog	2	7	6
2	(Slovakia) D Cibulková	6	5	4

Second round
LL	(Poland) M Fręch	2	4
(Croatia) J Fett	6	6
(Australia) A Tomljanović	6	6
(Belgium) K Flipkens	3	2
7	(Serbia) A Krunić	6	6
(Spain) S Sorribes Tormo	3	1
Q	(Spain) P Badosa Gibert	6^{5}	6	6
(Slovenia) P Hercog	7^{7}	1	2

Quarterfinals
(Croatia) J Fett	6	3	3
(Australia) A Tomljanović	3	6	6
7	(Serbia) A Krunić	6	1
Q	(Spain) P Badosa Gibert	2	0^{r}

Semifinals
(Australia) A Tomljanović	7	6
7	(Serbia) A Krunić	5	2

== Qualifying ==
=== Seeds ===
1. (Russia) Anna Blinkova (second round)
2. (United States) Caroline Dolehide (first round)
3. (Montenegro) Danka Kovinić (first round)
4. (Netherlands) Arantxa Rus (second round)
5. (Slovenia) Tamara Zidanšek (qualified)
6. (Switzerland) Jil Teichmann (second round)
7. (Poland) Magdalena Fręch (qualifying competition, lucky loser)
8. (Czech Republic) Barbora Krejčíková (second round)

=== Qualifiers ===
1. (Spain) Sílvia Soler Espinosa
2. (France) Fiona Ferro
3. (Slovenia) Tamara Zidanšek
4. (Spain) Paula Badosa Gibert

=== Lucky losers ===
1. (Romania) Alexandra Dulgheru
2. (Poland) Magdalena Fręch

=== Draw ===
==== First qualifier ====
First round
1	(Russia) Anna Blinkova	6	7^{7}
(Chile) Daniela Seguel	4	6^{1}
(Spain) Sílvia Soler Espinosa	6	6
WC	(Egypt) Sandra Samir	2	0
(Spain) Georgina García Pérez	0	2
(Italy) Martina Trevisan	6	6
(Turkey) Ayla Aksu	1	0
8	(Czech Republic) Barbora Krejčíková	6	6

Second round
1	(Russia) Anna Blinkova	4	3
(Spain) Sílvia Soler Espinosa	6	6
(Italy) Martina Trevisan	6	6
8	(Czech Republic) Barbora Krejčíková	2	3

Qualifying competition
(Spain) Sílvia Soler Espinosa	6	6
(Italy) Martina Trevisan	4	4

==== Second qualifier ====
First round
2	(United States) Caroline Dolehide	7^{7}	3	3
(France) Fiona Ferro	6^{5}	6	6
(France) Myrtille Georges	6	4	1^{r}
(France) Jessika Ponchet	4	6	4
(Romania) Alexandra Dulgheru	6	6
WC	(Morocco) Salma Charif	0	2
WC	(Hungary) Panna Udvardy	3	1
6	(Switzerland) Jil Teichmann	6	6

Second round
(France) Fiona Ferro	6	6
(France) Jessika Ponchet	4	3
(Romania) Alexandra Dulgheru	6	6
6	(Switzerland) Jil Teichmann	2	1

Qualifying competition
(France) Fiona Ferro	6	6
(Romania) Alexandra Dulgheru	1	4

==== Third qualifier ====
First round
3	(Montenegro) Danka Kovinić	6^{2}	3
(Hungary) Fanny Stollár	7^{7}	6
(Australia) Isabelle Wallace	3	1
(Belgium) Maryna Zanevska	6	6
(Belgium) Marie Benoît	6	6
(France) Harmony Tan	1	1
(Netherlands) Bibiane Schoofs	3	6	4
5	(Slovenia) Tamara Zidanšek	6	3	6

Second round
(Hungary) Fanny Stollár	6	6
(Belgium) Maryna Zanevska	3	4
(Belgium) Marie Benoît	2	2
5	(Slovenia) Tamara Zidanšek	6	6

Qualifying competition
(Hungary) Fanny Stollár	6	4	4
5	(Slovenia) Tamara Zidanšek	4	6	6

==== Fourth qualifier ====
First round
4	(Netherlands) Arantxa Rus	6	6
(Tunisia) Ons Jabeur	3	1
(Spain) Paula Badosa Gibert	3	7	6
(Turkey) Başak Eraydın	6	5	1
(Turkey) İpek Soylu	6	6
(Australia) Lizette Cabrera	3	4
(Switzerland) Conny Perrin	3	3
7	(Poland) Magdalena Fręch	6	6

Second round
4	(Netherlands) Arantxa Rus	6	4	3
(Spain) Paula Badosa Gibert	1	6	6
(Turkey) İpek Soylu	4	1^{r}
7	(Poland) Magdalena Fręch	6	4

Qualifying competition
(Spain) Paula Badosa Gibert	6	6
7	(Poland) Magdalena Fręch	1	3
