= Mira Antonitsch =

Austrian tennis player (born 1998)

- Country (sports): Austria
- Born: 16 December 1998 (age 27) Vienna, Austria
- Height: 1.69 m (5 ft 7 in)
- Retired: (last match played Nov 2023)
- Plays: Right-handed (two-handed backhand)
- Coach: Günter Bresnik
- Prize money: $38,982

Singles
- Career record: 103–81
- Career titles: 2 ITF
- Highest ranking: No. 507 (12 June 2017)

Doubles
- Career record: 42–26
- Career titles: 5 ITF
- Highest ranking: No. 704 (21 September 2020)
- Last updated on: 4 April 2024.

Mira Antonitsch (born 16 December 1998) is an inactive Austrian tennis player.

Antonitsch has won two singles and five doubles titles on the ITF Women's Circuit. On 12 June 2017, she reached her best singles ranking of world No. 507. On 4 November 2019, she peaked at No. 717 in the WTA doubles rankings.

In May 2016, Antonitsch was awarded a wildcard into the main draw of the 2016 Nürnberger Versicherungscup, but lost in the first round to fourth seed and world No. 42, Lesia Tsurenko.

== Personal life ==
Her father, Alex Antonitsch, was also a professional tennis player.

== ITF Circuit finals ==
=== Singles: 5 (2 titles, 3 runner-ups) ===
Legend $50,000 tournaments $25,000 tournaments $15,000 tournaments $10,000 tournaments	Finals by surface Hard (0–0) Clay (2–3)

Result	W–L	Date	Tournament	Surface	Opponent	Score
Loss	0–1	Jul 2016	ITF Niš, Serbia	Clay	(Slovakia) Viktória Kužmová	1–6, 2–6
Win	1–1	Aug 2016	ITF Vienna, Austria	Clay	(Czech Republic) Petra Krejsová	3–6, 7–6^{(2)}, 7–6^{(2)}
Loss	1–2	Mar 2017	ITF Heraklion, Greece	Clay	(United States) Sabrina Santamaria	2–6, 0–6
Win	2–2	Jun 2019	ITF Banja Luka, Bosnia & Herzegovina	Clay	(Czech Republic) Bárbora Miklová	6–3, 6–3
Loss	2–3	Sep 2020	ITF Cordenons, Italy	Clay	(China) Zheng Qinwen	1–6, 0–6

=== Doubles: 7 (5 titles, 2 runner-ups) ===
Legend $50,000 tournaments $25,000 tournaments $15,000 tournaments $10,000 tournaments	Finals by surface Hard (1–1) Clay (4–1) Grass (0–0) Carpet (0–0)

Result	W–L	Date	Tournament	Tier	Surface	Partner	Opponents	Score
Win	1–0	Aug 2015	ITF Pörtschach, Austria	10,000	Clay	(Austria) Julia Grabher	(Croatia) Iva Primorac (Austria) Janina Toljan	6–2, 6–1
Loss	1–1	Oct 2016	ITF Heraklion, Greece	10,000	Hard	(Netherlands) Phillis Vanenburg	(Netherlands) Nina Kruijer (Netherlands) Suzan Lamens	4–6, 6–4, [10–12]
Win	2–1	Mar 2017	ITF Heraklion, Greece	15,000	Clay	(India) Karman Thandi	(Ukraine) Olga Ianchuk (Greece) Despina Papamichail	6–0, 6–3
Win	3–1	May 2017	ITF Győr, Hungary	15,000	Clay	(Hungary) Panna Udvardy	(Serbia) Tamara Čurović (China) Wang Xinyu	6–1, 6–2
Win	4–1	May 2018	ITF Antalya, Turkey	15,000	Clay	(Czech Republic) Johana Marková	(Japan) Haruna Arakawa (Czech Republic) Magdalena Pantucková	6–3, 7–5
Loss	4–2	Nov 2018	ITF Heraklion, Greece	15,000	Clay	(Germany) Sarah Nikocevic	(Greece) Anna Arkadianou (Russia) Elina Nepliy	3–6, 6–7^{(3)}
Win	5–2	Oct 2019	ITF Antalya, Turkey	15,000	Hard	(United Kingdom) Gabriella Taylor	(Ukraine) Viktoriia Dema (Netherlands) Noa Liauw a Fong	6–4, 6–7^{(5)}, [10–3]

== Fed Cup participation ==
Antonitsch was nominated to make her Fed Cup debut for Austria in 2019, while the team was competing in the Europe/Africa Zone Group II; their opponents forfeited the match.

Group membership World Group (0–0) World Group Play-off (0–0) World Group II (0–0) World Group II Play-off (0–0) Europe/Africa Group (0–0)	Matches by surface Hard (0–0) Clay (0–0) Grass (0–0) Carpet (0–0)	Matches by type Singles (0–0) Doubles (0–0)	Matches by setting Indoors (0–0) Outdoors (0–0)

=== Doubles (0–0) ===
Edition	Stage	Date	Location	Against	Surface	Partner	Opponents	W/L	Score
2019 Fed Cup; Europe/Africa Zone Group II	Pool A	8 February 2019	Esch-sur-Alzette, Luxembourg	Bosnia and Herzegovina	Hard (i)	Sinja Kraus	Anita Husarić; Jelena Simić	W	w/o *

* walkover doesn't count in her overall record.
