= Cláudia Cianci =

Portuguese tennis player (born 1996)

Claudia Cianci
- Country (sports): Portugal
- Born: 7 June 1996 (age 30)
- Plays: Right-handed (one-handed backhand)
- Prize money: $8,867

Singles
- Career record: 37–66
- Career titles: 0
- Highest ranking: 846 (31 December 2018)
- Current ranking: 851 (4 February 2019)

Doubles
- Career record: 35–46
- Career titles: 0
- Highest ranking: 756 (26 June 2017)
- Current ranking: 923 (4 February 2019)

Team competitions
- Fed Cup: 0–1
- Last updated on: 8 February 2019.

Cláudia Cianci (born 7 June 1996) is a Portuguese tennis player.

Cianci has a career high WTA singles ranking of 846, achieved on 31 December 2018. She also has a career high WTA doubles ranking of 756, achieved on 26 June 2017.

Cianci made her Fed Cup debut for Portugal in 2019.
