= 2019 Fed Cup Europe/Africa Zone Group II – Pool B =

Subsection of tennis competition

Pool B of the 2019 Fed Cup Europe/Africa Zone Group II was one of two pools in the Europe/Africa zone of the 2019 Fed Cup. Four teams competed in a round robin competition, with the top team and the bottom team proceeding to their respective sections of the play-offs: the top team played for advancement to the Group I, while the bottom team faced potential relegation to Group III.

== Standings ==
		LUX	ISR	POR	RSA	RR; W–L	Set; W–L	Game; W–L	Standings
3	Luxembourg		3–0	3–0	2–1	3–0	16–2 (89%)	99–36 (73%)	1
2	Israel	0–3		2–1	2–1	2–1	8–12 (40%)	80–98 (45%)	2
5	Portugal	0–3	1–2		2–0	1–2	7–10 (41%)	62–81 (43%)	3
6	South Africa	1–2	1–2	0–2		0–3	5–12 (29%)	65–91 (42%)	4

Standings are determined by: 1. number of wins; 2. number of matches; 3. in two-team ties, head-to-head records; 4. in three-team ties, (a) percentage of sets won (head-to-head records if two teams remain tied), then (b) percentage of games won (head-to-head records if two teams remain tied), then (c) Fed Cup rankings.

== Round-robin ==
=== Israel vs. Portugal ===
Israel
2
Centre National de Tennis, Esch-sur-Alzette, Luxembourg
6 February
Hard (indoor)

Portugal
1

			1	2	3
1	(Israel) (Portugal)	Lina Glushko; Maria Inês Fonte	6; 1	6; 2
2	(Israel) (Portugal)	Maya Tahan; Francisca Jorge	2; 6	3; 6
3	(Israel) (Portugal)	Lina Glushko / Maya Tahan; Maria Inês Fonte / Francisca Jorge	3; 6	6; 4	6; 2

=== Luxembourg vs. South Africa ===
Luxembourg
2
Centre National de Tennis, Esch-sur-Alzette, Luxembourg
6 February
Hard (indoor)

South Africa
1

			1	2	3
1	(Luxembourg) (South Africa)	Eléonora Molinaro; Theresa van Zyl	6; 1	6; 2
2	(Luxembourg) (South Africa)	Mandy Minella; Chanel Simmonds	6; 1	6; 1
3	(Luxembourg) (South Africa)	Laura Correia / Claudine Schaul; Madrie Le Roux / Chanel Simmonds	1; 6	2; 6

=== Israel vs. South Africa ===
Israel
2
Centre National de Tennis, Esch-sur-Alzette, Luxembourg
7 February
Hard (indoor)

South Africa
1

			1	2	3
1	(Israel) (South Africa)	Lina Glushko; Madrie Le Roux	6^{2} 7^{7}	6; 3	6; 4
2	(Israel) (South Africa)	Maya Tahan; Chanel Simmonds	4; 6	4; 6
3	(Israel) (South Africa)	Lina Glushko / Maya Tahan; Madrie Le Roux / Chanel Simmonds	6; 3	7^{7} 6^{2}

=== Luxembourg vs. Portugal ===
Luxembourg
3
Centre National de Tennis, Esch-sur-Alzette, Luxembourg
7 February
Hard (indoor)

Portugal
0

			1	2	3
1	(Luxembourg) (Portugal)	Eléonora Molinaro; Ana Filipa Santos	6; 1	6; 1
2	(Luxembourg) (Portugal)	Mandy Minella; Francisca Jorge	6; 3	6; 0
3	(Luxembourg) (Portugal)	Eléonora Molinaro / Claudine Schaul; Maria Inês Fonte / Cláudia Cianci	6; 1	6; 4

=== Israel vs. Luxembourg ===
Israel
0
Centre National de Tennis, Esch-sur-Alzette, Luxembourg
8 February
Hard (indoor)

Luxembourg
3

			1	2	3
1	(Israel) (Luxembourg)	Darya Shvartsmann; Eléonora Molinaro	2; 6	0; 6
2	(Israel) (Luxembourg)	Maya Tahan; Mandy Minella	2; 6	0; 6
3	(Israel) (Luxembourg)	Shahar Biran / Lina Glushko; Mandy Minella / Eléonora Molinaro	3; 6	2; 6

=== Portugal vs. South Africa ===
Portugal
2
Centre National de Tennis, Esch-sur-Alzette, Luxembourg
8 February
Hard (indoor)

South Africa
0

			1	2	3
1	(Portugal) (South Africa)	Ana Filipa Santos; Zani Barnard	6; 4	7; 5
2	(Portugal) (South Africa)	Francisca Jorge; Chanel Simmonds	6; 1	6; 3
3	(Portugal) (South Africa)	Francisca Jorge / Ana Filipa Santos; Imaan Hassim / Madrie Le Roux				not played
