= 2017 Grand Prix SAR La Princesse Lalla Meryem =

- Date: 1 – 6 May
- Edition: 17th
- Category: WTA International
- Draw: 32S / 16D
- Prize money: $250,000
- Surface: Clay / outdoor
- Location: Rabat, Morocco
- Venue: Club des Cheminots

Champions

Singles
- (Russia) Anastasia Pavlyuchenkova

Doubles
- (Hungary) Tímea Babos / (Czech Republic) Andrea Hlaváčková
- Morocco Open

The 2017 Grand Prix SAR La Princesse Lalla Meryem was a women's professional tennis tournament played on clay courts. It was the 17th edition of the tournament and part of the WTA International tournaments category of the 2017 WTA Tour. It took place in Rabat, Morocco, between 1 and 6 May 2017.

== Point distribution ==
Event	W	F	SF	QF	Round of 16	Round of 32	Q	Q3	Q2	Q1
Women's singles	280	180	110	60	30	1	18	14	10	1
Women's doubles	280	180	110	60	1	—N/a	—N/a	—N/a	—N/a	—N/a

== Singles main draw entrants ==
=== Seeds ===
Country	Player	Rank^{1}	Seed
RUS	Anastasia Pavlyuchenkova	16	1
SUI	Timea Bacsinszky	22	2
AUS	Daria Gavrilova	27	3
HUN	Tímea Babos	30	4
KAZ	Yulia Putintseva	31	5
ROU	Irina-Camelia Begu	33	6
USA	Lauren Davis	35	7
USA	Alison Riske	39	8

- ^{1} Rankings as of April 24, 2017

=== Other entrants ===
The following players received wildcards into the singles main draw:

- (Russia) Anna Blinkova
- (Morocco) Lina Qostal
- (Italy) Francesca Schiavone

The following players received entry as qualifiers:

- (Canada) Gabriela Dabrowski
- (Serbia) Aleksandra Krunić
- (Switzerland) Conny Perrin
- (Argentina) Nadia Podoroska

The following player received entry as a Lucky Loser:

- (Spain) Sílvia Soler Espinosa

=== Withdrawals ===
Before the tournament

- (France) Caroline Garcia → replaced by (Germany) Andrea Petkovic
- (China) Peng Shuai → replaced by (Italy) Sara Errani
- (United States) Shelby Rogers → replaced by (Belgium) Maryna Zanevska
- (Latvia) Anastasija Sevastova → replaced by (Germany) Tatjana Maria
- (Germany) Laura Siegemund → replaced by (Spain) Sílvia Soler Espinosa

== Doubles main draw entrants ==
=== Seeds ===
Country	Player	Country	Player	Rank^{1}	Seed
HUN	Tímea Babos	CZE	Andrea Hlaváčková	23	1
CRO	Darija Jurak	AUS	Anastasia Rodionova	67	2
ROU	Raluca Olaru	UKR	Olga Savchuk	102	3
CZE	Barbora Krejčíková	RUS	Alla Kudryavtseva	105	4

- ^{1} Rankings as of April 24, 2017

=== Other entrants ===
The following pairs received wildcards into the doubles main draw:

- (Morocco) Abir Elfahimi / (Morocco) Lilya Hadab
- (Spain) Laura Pous Tió / (Morocco) Lina Qostal

== Champions ==
=== Singles ===
- (Russia) Anastasia Pavlyuchenkova def. (Italy) Francesca Schiavone 7–5, 7–5

=== Doubles ===
- (Hungary) Tímea Babos / (Czech Republic) Andrea Hlaváčková def. (Serbia) Nina Stojanović / (Belgium) Maryna Zanevska 2–6, 6–3, [10–5]
