= 2019 Fed Cup Europe/Africa Zone Group II – Pool A =

Subsection of tennis competition

Pool A of the 2019 Fed Cup Europe/Africa Zone Group II was one of two pools in the Europe/Africa zone of the 2019 Fed Cup. Three teams competed in a round robin competition, with the top team and the bottom team proceeding to their respective sections of the play-offs: the top team played for advancement to the Group I, while the bottom team faced potential relegation to Group III.

== Standings ==
		AUT	TUN	BIH	RR; W–L	Set; W–L	Game; W–L	Standings
1	Austria		2–1	3–0	2–0	11–2 (85%)	69–33 (68%)	1
7	Tunisia	1–2		2–1	1–1	6–7 (46%)	59–56 (51%)	2
4	Bosnia and Herzegovina	0–3	1–2		0–2	2–10 (17%)	30–69 (30%)	3

Standings are determined by: 1. number of wins; 2. number of matches; 3. in two-team ties, head-to-head records; 4. in three-team ties, (a) percentage of sets won (head-to-head records if two teams remain tied), then (b) percentage of games won (head-to-head records if two teams remain tied), then (c) Fed Cup rankings.

== Round-robin ==
=== Austria vs. Tunisia ===
Austria
2
Centre National de Tennis, Esch-sur-Alzette, Luxembourg
6 February
Hard (indoor)

Tunisia
1

			1	2	3
1	(Austria) (Tunisia)	Julia Grabher; Chiraz Bechri	7; 5	6; 0
2	(Austria) (Tunisia)	Barbara Haas; Ons Jabeur	6; 1	2; 6	0; 6
3	(Austria) (Tunisia)	Barbara Haas / Melanie Klaffner; Chiraz Bechri / Ons Jabeur	6; 4	6; 4

=== Bosnia and Herzegovina vs. Tunisia ===
Bosnia and Herzegovina
1
Centre National de Tennis, Esch-sur-Alzette, Luxembourg
7 February
Hard (indoor)

Tunisia
2

			1	2	3
1	(Bosnia and Herzegovina) (Tunisia)	Jelena Simić; Chiraz Bechri	4; 6	2; 6
2	(Bosnia and Herzegovina) (Tunisia)	Dea Herdželaš; Ons Jabeur	0; 6	4; 6
3	(Bosnia and Herzegovina) (Tunisia)	Anita Husarić / Jelena Simić; Ferdaous Bahri / Ons Jabeur	6; 4	7; 5

=== Austria vs. Bosnia and Herzegovina ===
Austria
3
Centre National de Tennis, Esch-sur-Alzette, Luxembourg
8 February
Hard (indoor)

Bosnia and Herzegovina
0

			1	2	3
1	(Austria) (Bosnia and Herzegovina)	Melanie Klaffner; Jelena Simić	6; 3	6; 2
2	(Austria) (Bosnia and Herzegovina)	Barbara Haas; Anita Husarić	6; 2	6; 0
3	(Austria) (Bosnia and Herzegovina)	Mira Antonitsch / Sinja Kraus; Anita Husarić / Jelena Simić	6; 0	6; 0		w/o
