= Lilya Hadab =

Moroccan tennis player

- Country (sports): Morocco
- Born: 13 May 1999 (age 26)
- Prize money: $1,074

Singles
- Career record: 4–9
- Career titles: 0

Doubles
- Career record: 4–7
- Career titles: 0
- Highest ranking: No. 1097 (26 September 2016)
- Last updated on: 1 May 2017.

Lilya Hadab (born 13 May 1999) is a Moroccan tennis player.

Hadab has a career high WTA doubles ranking of 1097 achieved on 26 September 2016.

Hadab made her WTA main draw debut at the 2017 Grand Prix SAR La Princesse Lalla Meryem in the doubles draw.

== ITF Junior finals ==
Grand Slam
Category GA
Category G1
Category G2
Category G3
Category G4
Category G5

=== Singles Finals (0–1) ===
| Outcome | No. | Date | Tournament | Surface | Opponent | Score |
|---|---|---|---|---|---|---|
| Runner-up | 1. | 15 October 2016 | Mostaganem, Algeria | Hard | (Tunisia) Mouna Bouzgarrou | 1–6, 4–6 |

=== Doubles finals (0–4) ===
| Outcome | No. | Date | Tournament | Surface | Partner | Opponents in the final | Score in the final |
|---|---|---|---|---|---|---|---|
| Runner-up | 1. | 8 November 2013 | Esch-sur-Alzette, Luxembourg | Hard (i) | (United Kingdom) Megan Rogers | (Austria) Mira Antonitsch (Belgium) Nina Van Oost | 4–6, 3–6 |
| Runner-up | 2. | 17 October 2015 | Algiers, Algeria | Clay | (Tunisia) Mouna Bouzgarrou | (Morocco) Oumaima Aziz (Burundi) Sada Nahimana | 3–6, 4–6 |
| Runner-up | 3. | 6 August 2016 | Harare, Zimbabwe | Hard | (Japan) Natsumi Kawaguchi | (United States) Kacie Harvey (Netherlands) Merel Hoedt | 3–6, 4–6 |
| Runner-up | 4. | 15 October 2016 | Mostaganem, Algeria | Hard | (Morocco) Nada Zine | (Tunisia) Ferdaous Bahri (Tunisia) Mouna Bouzgarrou | 6–3, 4–6 [8–10] |
