= Oumaima Aziz =

Moroccan tennis player (born 2001)

- Country (sports): Morocco
- Born: 1 March 2001 (age 24)
- Prize money: $3,283

Singles
- Career record: 6–12

Doubles
- Career record: 10–10
- Highest ranking: No. 943 (27 February 2023)

Oumaima Aziz (born 1 March 2001) is an inactive Moroccan tennis player.

Aziz has a career-high ITF juniors ranking of 185, achieved on 26 March 2018.

She made her WTA Tour main-draw debut at the 2018 Rabat Grand Prix in the doubles tournament, partnering Diae El Jardi.

Aziz represents Morocco in Billie Jean King Cup, where she has a win/loss record of 3–2.

== ITF Junior Circuit finals ==
Category GA
Category G1
Category G2
Category G3
Category G4
Category G5

=== Singles (1–0) ===
Outcome	No.	Date	Tournament	Surface	Opponent	Score
Winner	1.	31 January 2015	ITF Nairobi, Kenya	Clay	(Morocco) Hiba El Khalifi	6–3, 7–5

=== Doubles (6–4) ===
Outcome	No.	Date	Tournament	Surface	Partner	Opponents	Score
Winner	1.	16 May 2015	ITF Algiers, Algeria	Clay	(Burundi) Sada Nahimana	(Tunisia) Mouna Bouzgarrou (Morocco) Lilya Hadab	6–3, 6–4
Winner	2.	24 October 2015	ITF Rabat, Morocco	Clay	(Burundi) Sada Nahimana	(Germany) Franziska-Marie Ahrend (Germany) Linda Puppendahl	6–3, 6–2
Winner	3.	31 October 2015	ITF Mohammedia, Morocco	Clay	(Bulgaria) Gergana Topalova	(Morocco) Diae El Jardi (Burundi) Sada Nahimana	6–3, 6–4
Winner	4.	13 February 2016	ITF El Menzah, Tunisia	Hard	(Morocco) Diae El Jardi	(Tunisia) Chiraz Bechri (Algeria) Inès Ibbou	w/o
Runner-up	5.	13 May 2017	ITF Casablanca, Morocco	Clay	(Algeria) Lynda Benkaddour	(Georgia (country)) Zoziya Kardava (Russia) Avelina Sayfetdinova	7–5, 2–6 [3–10]
Runner-up	6.	21 October 2017	ITF Rabat, Morocco	Clay	(Burundi) Sada Nahimana	(United Kingdom) Esther Adeshina (United Kingdom) Erin Richardson	4–6, 6–7^{(2)}
Runner-up	7.	28 October 2017	ITF Mohammedia, Morocco	Clay	(Burundi) Sada Nahimana	(United Kingdom) Esther Adeshina (United Kingdom) Erin Richardson	w/o
Winner	8.	17 March 2018	ITF Marrakech, Morocco	Clay	(Morocco) Diae El Jardi	(Burundi) Sada Nahimana (Burundi) Aisha Niyonkuru	4–0, 2–4, [10–4]
Winner	9.	13 May 2017	ITF Casablanca, Morocco	Clay	(Algeria) Lynda Benkaddour	(Georgia (country)) Abla EL Kadri (Estonia) Carol Plakk	6–4, 6–4
Runner-up	10.	27 April 2018	ITF Tlemcen, Algeria	Clay	(Algeria) Lynda Benkaddour	(Burundi) Sada Nahimana (Turkey) Selin Övünç	0–6, 3–6
