= 2018 J&T Banka Prague Open – Doubles =

Doubles
- 2018 J&T Banka Prague Open

Final
- Champions: (United States) Nicole Melichar (Czech Republic) Květa Peschke
- Runners-up: (Romania) Mihaela Buzărnescu (Belarus) Lidziya Marozava
- Score: 6–4, 6–2

Details
- Draw: 16
- Seeds: 4

Events
Singles	Doubles
- J&T Banka Prague Open

Anna-Lena Grönefeld and Květa Peschke were the defending champions, but chose not to participate together. Grönefeld was scheduled to play alongside Raquel Atawo, but the pair withdrew due to Atawo's abductor injury. Peschke teamed up with Nicole Melichar and successfully defended the title, defeating Mihaela Buzărnescu and Lidziya Marozava in the final, 6–4, 6–2.

== Seeds ==
1. (Czech Republic) Andrea Sestini Hlaváčková / (Czech Republic) Renata Voráčová (semifinals)
2. (United States) Raquel Atawo / (Germany) Anna-Lena Grönefeld (withdrew)
3. (United States) Nicole Melichar / (Czech Republic) Květa Peschke (champions)
4. (Japan) Shuko Aoyama / (Japan) Miyu Kato (first round)
5. (Russia) Veronika Kudermetova / (Ukraine) Olga Savchuk (first round)

== Draw ==
Key

- Q = Qualifier
- WC = Wild card
- LL = Lucky loser
- Alt = Alternate
- ITF = ITF entry
- PR = Protected ranking
- SR = Special ranking
- SE = Special exempt
- JE = Junior exempt
- JR = Junior Accelerator Programme entrant
- CO = College Accelerator Programme entrant
- NG = Next Gen Accelerator Program entrant
- w/o = Walkover
- r = Retired
- d = Defaulted

=== Draw ===
First round
1	(Czech Republic) A Sestini Hlaváčková (Czech Republic) R Voráčová	6	6
(Russia) A Fomina (Russia) V Ivakhnenko	4	0
(China) C Liang (China) S Zhang	5	7^{7}	[8]
Alt	(Japan) M Doi (Sweden) C Lister	7	6^{1}	[10]
3	(United States) N Melichar (Czech Republic) K Peschke	2	6	[10]
(Czech Republic) P Krejsová (Czech Republic) J Malečková	6	4	[4]
(Latvia) D Marcinkēviča (Belarus) A Sasnovich	6	1	[12]
WC	(Slovakia) V Kužmová (Romania) E-G Ruse	4	6	[14]
(Romania) M Buzărnescu (Belarus) L Marozava	6	6
(Canada) G Dabrowski (Australia) E Perez	1	3
(United States) D Krawczyk (Mexico) G Olmos	6	2	[10]
4	(Japan) S Aoyama (Japan) M Kato	2	6	[6]
(Argentina) M Irigoyen (Hungary) RL Jani	5	2
(Australia) P Hon (Russia) Y Sizikova	7	6
WC	(Czech Republic) B Štefková (Czech Republic) B Strýcová	6	7
5	(Russia) V Kudermetova (Ukraine) O Savchuk	3	5

Quarterfinals
1	(Czech Republic) A Sestini Hlaváčková (Czech Republic) R Voráčová	6^{5}	7	[10]
Alt	(Japan) M Doi (Sweden) C Lister	7^{7}	5	[5]
3	(United States) N Melichar (Czech Republic) K Peschke	6	6
WC	(Slovakia) V Kužmová (Romania) E-G Ruse	1	0
(Romania) M Buzărnescu (Belarus) L Marozava	6	4	[10]
(United States) D Krawczyk (Mexico) G Olmos	3	6	[8]
(Australia) P Hon (Russia) Y Sizikova	3	3
WC	(Czech Republic) B Štefková (Czech Republic) B Strýcová	6	6

Semifinals
1	(Czech Republic) A Sestini Hlaváčková (Czech Republic) R Voráčová	4	0
3	(United States) N Melichar (Czech Republic) K Peschke	6	6
(Romania) M Buzărnescu (Belarus) L Marozava	w/o
WC	(Czech Republic) B Štefková (Czech Republic) B Strýcová

Final
3	(United States) N Melichar (Czech Republic) K Peschke	6	6
(Romania) M Buzărnescu (Belarus) L Marozava	4	2
