= Diae El Jardi =

Moroccan tennis player

Diae El (Temį) Jardi
- Country (sports): Morocco
- Born: 13 October 2000 (age 26) Meknes, Morocco
- Plays: Right (two-handed backhand)
- Prize money: $25,468

Singles
- Career record: 31–43
- Highest ranking: No. 940 (29 June 2026)
- Current ranking: No. 946 (13 July 2026)

Grand Slam singles results
- Australian Open Junior: 1R (2018)

Doubles
- Career record: 51–37
- Career titles: 5 ITF
- Highest ranking: No. 355 (10 November 2025)
- Current ranking: No. 433 (13 July 2026)

Team competitions
- Fed Cup: 2–7
- Last updated on: 16 July 2026.

Diae El Jardi
Medal record

Women's tennis

Representing Morocco

Mediterranean Games
Bronze medal – third place	2026 Taranto	Mixed doubles

Diae El (Temį) Jardi (13 October 2000) is a Moroccan professional tennis player.

== Career ==
She has played for Morocco in Fed Cup where she has a win–loss record of 2–7.

On the junior tour, El Jardi reached a career-high ranking of 38 on 26 March 2018.

El Jardi made her WTA Tour main-draw debut at the 2018 Morocco Open, where she received a wildcard entry into the singles and doubles draw, partnering Oumaima Aziz. In singles, she was defeated by Ukrainian Katarina Zavatska in two sets.

El Jardi has played for the Rice University women's tennis team, the Rice Owls, since 2019.

== ITF Circuit finals ==
=== Doubles: 8 (6 titles, 2 runner-ups) ===
Legend W50 tournaments W35 tournaments W15 tournaments	Finals by surface Hard (4–1) Clay (2–1)

Result	W–L	Date	Tournament	Tier	Surface	Partner	Opponents	Score
Win	1–0	Nov 2024	ITF Austin, United States	W50	Hard	(Brazil) Thaísa Grana Pedretti	(United States) Whitney Osuigwe (United States) Alana Smith	6–2, 4–6, [14–12]
Win	2–0	Apr 2025	ITF Boca Raton, US	W35	Clay	(United States) Ayana Akli	(Greece) Despina Papamichail (Bulgaria) Gergana Topalova	7–6^{(1)}, 7–5
Loss	2–1	Oct 2025	ITF Monastir, Tunisia	W15	Hard	(United Kingdom) Lauryn John-Baptiste	Maria Golovina (Poland) Monika Stankiewicz	4–6, 6–3, [7–10]
Win	3–1	Oct 2025	ITF Monastir, Tunisia	W15	Hard	(Poland) Dominika Podhajecka	(Belgium) Tamila Gadamauri (Belgium) Romane Longueville	5–7, 6–3, [10–7]
Win	4–1	Dec 2025	ITF Antalya, Turkey	W15	Clay	(Romania) Maria Sara Popa	(Iran) Meshkatolzahra Safi (China) Xu Jiayu	6–4, 3–6, [13–11]
Loss	4–2	Jun 2026	ITF Casablanca, Morocco	W15	Clay	(Morocco) Aya El Aouni	(France) Sarah Iliev (France) Emma Léné	4–6, 2–6
Win	5–2	Jul 2026	ITF Columbus, US	W50	Hard (i)	(United States) Ayana Akli	(United States) Ava Hrastar (United States) Victoria Mulville	6–3, 1–6, [10–7]
Win	6–2	Oct 2026	ITF Lexington, US	W50	Hard	(India) Sahaja Yamalapalli	(United States) Dalayna Hewitt (Ukraine) Valeriya Strakhova	2–6, 7–5, [12–10]

== ITF Junior Circuit finals ==
Category G1
Category G2
Category G3
Category G4
Category G5

=== Singles (2–4) ===
Outcome	No.	Date	Tournament	Surface	Opponent	Score
Runner-up	1.	14 February 2015	ITF Nairobi, Kenya	Clay	(Poland) Karolina Silwanowicz	5–7, 4–6
Winner	2.	8 August 2015	ITF Harare, Zimbabwe	Hard	(Gabon) Célestine Avomo Ella	6–3, 7–5
Runner-up	3.	31 October 2015	ITF Mohammedia, Morocco	Clay	(Burundi) Sada Nahimana	2–6, 2–6
Runner-up	4.	11 February 2017	ITF Tunis, Tunisia	Hard	(South Africa) Zoe Kruger	2–4, 2–4
Winner	5.	17 March 2018	ITF Marrakech, Morocco	Clay	(Burundi) Sada Nahimana	4–6, 6–4, 6–4
Runner-up	6.	24 March 2018	ITF Casablanca, Morocco	Clay	(Italy) Melania Delai	4–6, 3–6

=== Doubles (9–2) ===
Outcome	No.	Date	Tournament	Surface	Partner	Opponents	Score
Winner	1.	16 May 2015	ITF Casablanca, Morocco	Clay	(Burundi) Sada Nahimana	(Egypt) Lamis Alhussein Abdel Aziz (Egypt) Laila Elnimr	6–2, 4–6, [10–8]
Runner-up	2.	2 August 2015	ITF Pretoria, South Africa	Hard	(Morocco) Ghita Benhadi	(South Africa) Lee Barnard (South Africa) Zani Barnard	4–6, 4–6
Winner	3.	8 August 2015	ITF Harare, Zimbabwe	Hard	(Morocco) Ghita Benhadi	(Gabon) Célestine Avomo Ella (Burundi) Mariam Mujawimana	6–4, 6–2
Winner	4.	15 August 2015	ITF Harare, Zimbabwe	Hard	(Morocco) Ghita Benhadi	(Denmark) Rebekka La Cour Hillingso (United Kingdom) Helena Jansen Figueras	6–3, 6–4
Runner-up	5.	31 October 2015	ITF Mohammedia, Morocco	Clay	(Burundi) Sada Nahimana	(Morocco) Oumaima Aziz (Bulgaria) Gergana Topalova	3–6, 4–6
Winner	6.	13 February 2016	ITF El Menzah, Tunisia	Hard	(Morocco) Oumaima Aziz	(Tunisia) Chiraz Bechri (Algeria) Inès Ibbou	w/o
Winner	7.	22 October 2016	ITF Rabat, Morocco	Clay	(Algeria) Lynda Benkaddour	(Italy) Enola Chiesa (Russia) Daria Solovyeva	6–1, 6–3
Winner	8.	31 October 2015	ITF Mohammedia, Morocco	Clay	(Russia) Anfisa Danilchenko	(Morocco) Zainab Bendahhou (Portugal) Francisca Jorge	7–6^{(7–3)}, 2–6, [10–6]
Winner	9.	1 September 2017	ITF Cairo, Egypt	Clay	(United Kingdom) Gemma Heath	(Georgia (country)) Zoziya Kardava (Georgia (country)) Mariam Dalakishvili	6–2, 6–3
Winner	10.	8 September 2017	ITF Cairo, Egypt	Clay	(United Kingdom) Gemma Heath	(Ukraine) Polina Gubina (Ukraine) Diana Khodan	7–5, 6–2
Winner	11.	17 March 2018	ITF Marrakech, Morocco	Clay	(Morocco) Oumaima Aziz	(Burundi) Sada Nahimana (Burundi) Aisha Niyonkuru	4–0, 2–4, [10–4]
