= 2019 Fed Cup Europe/Africa Zone =

Subsection of tennis competition

The Europe/Africa Zone is one of three zones of regional competition in the 2019 Fed Cup.

== Group I ==
Venue 1: Hala Widowiskowo-Sportowa, Zielona Góra, Poland (indoor hard)
Venue 2: University of Bath, Bath, United Kingdom (indoor hard)

Dates: 6–9 February

The fifteen teams were divided into three pools of four teams and one pool of three teams. The four pool winners took part in promotion play-offs to determine the two nations advancing to the World Group II play-offs. The nations finishing last in their pools took part in relegation play-offs, with the two losing nations being relegated to Group II for 2020. One nation was promoted and one nation was relegated from each venue.

=== Seeding ===
Pot	Nation	Rank^{1}	Seed
1	Russia	11	1
1	Great Britain	18	2
1	Ukraine	20	3
1	Serbia	21	4
2	Croatia	26	5
2	Poland	26	6
2	Estonia	27	7
2	Hungary	31	8
3	Bulgaria	36	9
3	Turkey	37	10
3	Denmark	43	11
3	Sweden	44	12
3	Greece	46	13
3	Georgia	47	14
3	Slovenia	48	15

- ^{1}Fed Cup Rankings as of 12 November 2018

=== Pools ===
	Pool A (Zielona Góra)	RUS	POL	DEN
1	Russia (2–0)		2–1	3–0
2	Poland (1–1)	1–2		3–0
3	Denmark (0–2)	0–3	0–3	

	Pool B (Zielona Góra)	SWE	UKR	BUL	EST
1	Sweden (3–0)		2–1	3–0	2–1
2	Ukraine (2–1)	1–2		2–1	3–0
3	Bulgaria (1–2)	0–3	1–2		2–1
4	Estonia (0–3)	1–2	0–3	1–2	

	Pool A (Bath)	GBR	HUN	GRE	SLO
1	Great Britain (3–0)		2–0	3–0	3–0
2	Hungary (2–1)	0–2		2–1	3–0
3	Greece (1–2)	0–3	1–2		2–1
4	Slovenia (0–3)	0–3	0–3	1–2	

	Pool B (Bath)	SRB	CRO	TUR	GEO
1	Serbia (3–0)		2–1	3–0	2–1
2	Croatia (2–1)	1–2		2–1	2–1
3	Turkey (1–2)	0–3	1–2		3–0
4	Georgia (0–3)	1–2	1–2	0–3	

=== Play-offs ===
Placing (Zielona Góra)	A Team	Score	B Team
Promotional	Russia	2–0	Sweden
5th–8th	Poland	2–1	Ukraine
9th	—N/a		Bulgaria
Relegation	Denmark	0–2	Estonia

Placing (Bath)	A Team	Score	B Team
Promotional	Great Britain	2–0	Serbia
5th–8th	Hungary	2–0	Croatia
9th–11th	Greece	1–2	Turkey
Relegation	Slovenia	2–0	Georgia

=== Final placements ===
Placing	Teams	
Promoted/First	Russia	Great Britain
Third	Sweden	Serbia
Fifth	Poland	Hungary
Seventh	Ukraine	Croatia
Ninth	Bulgaria	Turkey
Eleventh	—N/a	Greece
Twelfth	Estonia	Slovenia
Relegated/Fourteenth	Denmark	Georgia

- Russia and Great Britain were promoted to 2019 Fed Cup World Group II Play-offs
- Denmark and Georgia were relegated to Europe/Africa Zone Group II in 2020

== Group II ==
Venue: Centre National de Tennis, Esch-sur-Alzette, Luxembourg (indoor hard)

Dates: 6–9 February

The seven teams were divided into two pools of three and four teams. The two pool winners and runners-up took part in promotion play-offs to determine the two nations advancing to the Group I for 2020. The nations finishing third in their pools took part in a relegation play-off, with the losing nation being relegated to Group III for 2020. The nation finishing last in Group B was automatically relegated to Group III for 2020.

=== Seeding ===
Pot	Nation	Rank^{1}	Seed
1	Austria	49	1
1	Israel	53	2
2	Luxembourg	61	3
2	Bosnia and Herzegovina	62	4
3	Portugal	66	5
3	South Africa	70	6
3	Tunisia	71	7

- ^{1}Fed Cup Rankings as of 12 November 2018

=== Pools ===
	Pool A	AUT	TUN	BIH
1	Austria (2–0)		2–1	3–0
2	Tunisia (1–1)	1–2		2–1
3	Bosnia and Herzegovina (0–2)	0–3	1–2	

	Pool B	LUX	ISR	POR	RSA
1	Luxembourg (3–0)		3–0	3–0	2–1
2	Israel (2–1)	0–3		2–1	2–1
3	Portugal (1–2)	0–3	1–2		2–0
4	South Africa (0–3)	1–2	1–2	0–2	

=== Play-offs ===
Placing	A Team	Score	B Team
Promotional	Austria	2–0	Israel
Promotional	Tunisia	0–2	Luxembourg
Relegation	Bosnia and Herzegovina	1–2	Portugal
Relegation	—N/a		South Africa

=== Final placements ===
Placing	Teams	
Promoted/First	Austria	Luxembourg
Third	Israel	Tunisia
Fifth	Portugal	
Relegated/Sixth	Bosnia and Herzegovina	
Relegated/Seventh	South Africa	

- Austria and Luxembourg were promoted to Europe/Africa Zone Group I in 2020.
- Bosnia and Herzegovina and South Africa were relegated to Europe/Africa Zone Group III in 2020.

== Group III ==
Venue 1: Tali Tennis Center, Helsinki, Finland (indoor hard)
Venue 2: Ulcinj Bellevue, Ulcinj, Montenegro (clay)

Dates: 15–20 April

Format: 17 nations will compete across two different venues, with 9 nations taking part in Helsinki and 8 nations taking part in Ulcinj. In each location teams will compete across two pools; one pool of 5 teams and one pool of 4 teams in Helsinki, and one pool of 4 teams and one pool of 3 teams in Ulcinj. The winners of each pool will play-off to determine the nations advancing to Group II in 2020. One nation will be promoted from each venue.

=== Seeding ===
Pot	Nation	Rank^{1}	Seed
1	Norway	60	1
1	Lithuania	65	2
1	Cyprus	71	3
1	Egypt	73	4
2	Armenia	75	5
2	Morocco	76	6
2	North Macedonia	77	7
2	Finland	78	8
3	Malta	81	9
3	Ireland	82	10
3	Algeria	86	11
3	Montenegro	89	12
4	Kosovo	94	13
4	Kenya	95	14
4	Iceland	97	15
4	~~Cameroon~~	~~99~~	~~16~~
4	~~Uganda~~	~~102~~	~~17~~
4	Congo	NR	18

- ^{1}Fed Cup Rankings as of 11 February 2019

=== Pools ===
	Pool A (Helsinki)	FIN	LTU	MLT	ISL
1	Finland (3–0)		2–1	3–0	3–0
2	Lithuania (2–1)	1–2		3–0	3–0
3	Malta (1–2)	0–3	0–3		2–1
4	Iceland (0–3)	0–3	0–3	1–2	

	Pool B (Helsinki)	CYP	KOS	MKD	ALG	CGO
1	Cyprus (4–0)		2–1	2–1	3–0	3–0
2	Kosovo (3–1)	1–2		2–1	2–1	2–1
3	North Macedonia (2–2)	1–2	1–2		3–0	3–0
4	Algeria (1–3)	0–3	1–2	0–3		3–0
5	Congo (0–4)	0–3	1–2	0–3	0–3	

	Pool A (Ulcinj)	NOR	MNE	ARM
1	Norway (2–0)		3–0	3–0
2	Montenegro (1–1)	0–3		3–0
3	Armenia (0–2)	0–3	0–3	

	Pool B (Ulcinj)	EGY	IRL	MAR	KEN
1	Egypt (3–0)		2–1	2–1	3–0
2	Ireland (2–1)	1–2		2–1	3–0
3	Morocco (1–2)	1–2	1–2		3–0
4	Kenya (0–3)	0–3	0–3	0–3	

=== Play-offs ===
Placing (Helsinki)	A Team	Score	B Team
Promotional	Finland	2–0	Cyprus
3rd–4th	Lithuania	2–0	Kosovo
5th–6th	Malta	0–2	North Macedonia
7th–8th	Iceland	0–2	Algeria
9th	—N/a		Congo

Placing (Ulcinj)	A Team	Score	B Team
Promotional	Norway	1–2	Egypt
3rd–4th	Montenegro	1–2	Ireland
5th–6th	Armenia	0–3	Morocco
7th	—N/a		Kenya

=== Final placements ===
Placing	Teams	
Promoted/First	Finland	Egypt
Second	Cyprus	Norway
Third	Lithuania	Ireland
Fourth	Kosovo	Montenegro
Fifth	North Macedonia	Morocco
Sixth	Malta	Armenia
Seventh	Algeria	Kenya
Eighth	Iceland	
Ninth	Congo	

- Finland and Egypt were promoted to Europe/Africa Zone Group II in 2020.
