= 2014 ITF Women's Circuit (July–September) =

The 2014 ITF Women's Circuit is the 2014 edition of the second-tier tour for women's professional tennis. It is organised by the International Tennis Federation and is a tier below the WTA Tour, and a "half-step" below the WTA 125K series. It includes tournaments with prize money ranging from $10,000 up to $100,000.

== Key ==
$100,000 tournaments
$75,000 tournaments
$50,000 tournaments
$25,000 tournaments
$15,000 tournaments
$10,000 tournaments
All titles

== Month ==
=== July ===
Week of	Tournament	Winner	Runners-up	Semifinalists	Quarterfinalists
July 7	Open GDF Suez de Biarritz; Biarritz, France; Clay $100,000; Singles – Doubles	(Estonia) Kaia Kanepi; 6–2, 6–4	(Brazil) Teliana Pereira	(Luxembourg) Mandy Minella (Russia) Evgeniya Rodina	(France) Laura Thorpe (Hungary) Tímea Babos (Italy) Gaia Sanesi (France) Amandine Hesse
July 7	Open GDF Suez de Biarritz; Biarritz, France; Clay $100,000; Singles – Doubles	(Argentina) Florencia Molinero (Liechtenstein) Stephanie Vogt; 6–2, 6–2	(Spain) Lourdes Domínguez Lino (Brazil) Teliana Pereira	(Luxembourg) Mandy Minella (Russia) Evgeniya Rodina	(France) Laura Thorpe (Hungary) Tímea Babos (Italy) Gaia Sanesi (France) Amandine Hesse
July 7	FSP Gold River Women's Challenger; Sacramento, United States; Hard $50,000; Singles – Doubles	(Australia) Olivia Rogowska; 6–2, 7–5	(United States) Julia Boserup	(United States) Madison Brengle (Japan) Nao Hibino	(United States) Sachia Vickery (United States) Danielle Lao (United States) Louisa Chirico (United States) Jamie Loeb
July 7	FSP Gold River Women's Challenger; Sacramento, United States; Hard $50,000; Singles – Doubles	(Russia) Daria Gavrilova (Australia) Storm Sanders; 6–2, 6–1	(United States) Maria Sanchez (United States) Zoë Gwen Scandalis	(United States) Madison Brengle (Japan) Nao Hibino	(United States) Sachia Vickery (United States) Danielle Lao (United States) Louisa Chirico (United States) Jamie Loeb
July 7	Gatineau, Canada; Hard $25,000; Singles and doubles draws	(France) Stéphanie Foretz; 6–3, 3–6, 6–3	(Canada) Françoise Abanda	(Japan) Risa Ozaki (Japan) Hiroko Kuwata	(Japan) Mayo Hibi (Japan) Miharu Imanishi (Chinese Taipei) Hsu Chieh-yu (France) Julie Coin
July 7	Gatineau, Canada; Hard $25,000; Singles and doubles draws	(Japan) Hiroko Kuwata (Japan) Chiaki Okadaue; 6–4, 6–3	(Japan) Mana Ayukawa (Poland) Justyna Jegiołka	(Japan) Risa Ozaki (Japan) Hiroko Kuwata	(Japan) Mayo Hibi (Japan) Miharu Imanishi (Chinese Taipei) Hsu Chieh-yu (France) Julie Coin
July 7	Aschaffenburg, Germany; Clay $25,000; Singles and doubles draws	(Netherlands) Lesley Kerkhove; 7–5, 6–3	(Germany) Carina Witthöft	(Georgia (country)) Ekaterine Gorgodze (Switzerland) Viktorija Golubic	(Germany) Nina Zander (Serbia) Marina Kachar (Croatia) Ana Vrljić (France) Constance Sibille
July 7	Aschaffenburg, Germany; Clay $25,000; Singles and doubles draws	(Japan) Rika Fujiwara (Japan) Yuuki Tanaka; 6–1, 6–4	(Netherlands) Lesley Kerkhove (Switzerland) Xenia Knoll	(Georgia (country)) Ekaterine Gorgodze (Switzerland) Viktorija Golubic	(Germany) Nina Zander (Serbia) Marina Kachar (Croatia) Ana Vrljić (France) Constance Sibille
July 7	Sharm el-Sheikh, Egypt; Hard $10,000; Singles and doubles draws	(United States) Jan Abaza; 6–4, 6–4	(France) Pauline Payet	(France) Clothilde de Bernardi (United States) Alexandria Stiteler	(South Africa) Michelle Sammons (Russia) Anastasia Shaulskaya (Egypt) Ola Abou Zekry (Lithuania) Akvilė Paražinskaitė
July 7	Sharm el-Sheikh, Egypt; Hard $10,000; Singles and doubles draws	(United States) Jan Abaza (Russia) Anastasia Shaulskaya; 6–4, 6–3	(Romania) Jaqueline Adina Cristian (Lithuania) Akvilė Paražinskaitė	(France) Clothilde de Bernardi (United States) Alexandria Stiteler	(South Africa) Michelle Sammons (Russia) Anastasia Shaulskaya (Egypt) Ola Abou Zekry (Lithuania) Akvilė Paražinskaitė
July 7	Turin, Italy; Clay $10,000; Singles and doubles draws	(Colombia) Yuliana Lizarazo; 7–6^{(7–5)}, 6–3	(Italy) Alice Matteucci	(Italy) Corinna Dentoni (Germany) Sarah-Rebecca Sekulic	(France) Alix Collombon (Italy) Bianca Turati (Romania) Daiana Negreanu (Dominican Republic) Francesca Segarelli
July 7	Turin, Italy; Clay $10,000; Singles and doubles draws	(Colombia) Yuliana Lizarazo (Italy) Alice Matteucci; 6–3, 6–2	(Italy) Georgia Brescia (Switzerland) Lisa Sabino	(Italy) Corinna Dentoni (Germany) Sarah-Rebecca Sekulic	(France) Alix Collombon (Italy) Bianca Turati (Romania) Daiana Negreanu (Dominican Republic) Francesca Segarelli
July 7	Iași, Romania; Clay $10,000; Singles and doubles draws	(Romania) Oana Georgeta Simion; 6–2, 6–1	(Romania) Cristina Stancu	(Romania) Andreea Ghițescu (France) Camille Cheli	(Romania) Gabriela Talabă (Romania) Raluca Elena Platon (Moldova) Anastasia Vdovenco (Romania) Simona Ionescu
July 7	Iași, Romania; Clay $10,000; Singles and doubles draws	(Romania) Raluca Elena Platon (Romania) Cristina Stancu; 2–6, 6–4, [10–6]	(Romania) Oana Georgeta Simion (Romania) Gabriela Talabă	(Romania) Andreea Ghițescu (France) Camille Cheli	(Romania) Gabriela Talabă (Romania) Raluca Elena Platon (Moldova) Anastasia Vdovenco (Romania) Simona Ionescu
July 7	Getxo, Spain; Clay $10,000; Singles and doubles draws	(Spain) Laura Pous Tió; 6–7^{(4–7)}, 6–3, 7–5	(Spain) Olga Sáez Larra	(France) Estelle Cascino (Italy) Alice Savoretti	(Spain) Yvonne Cavallé Reimers (Spain) Arabela Fernández Rabener (Spain) Lucía Cervera Vázquez (Australia) Alexandra Nancarrow
July 7	Getxo, Spain; Clay $10,000; Singles and doubles draws	(Ecuador) Charlotte Römer (Spain) Olga Sáez Larra; 6–4, 7–5	(Australia) Alexandra Nancarrow (Spain) Olga Parres Azcoitia	(France) Estelle Cascino (Italy) Alice Savoretti	(Spain) Yvonne Cavallé Reimers (Spain) Arabela Fernández Rabener (Spain) Lucía Cervera Vázquez (Australia) Alexandra Nancarrow
July 7	Bangkok, Thailand; Hard $10,000; Singles and doubles draws	(China) Wang Yafan; 6–3, 6–2	(Uzbekistan) Sabina Sharipova	(Thailand) Varatchaya Wongteanchai (Japan) Akiko Omae	(South Africa) Chanel Simmonds (Japan) Kanae Hisami (Chinese Taipei) Lee Pei-chi (Thailand) Nudnida Luangnam
July 7	Bangkok, Thailand; Hard $10,000; Singles and doubles draws	(Thailand) Varatchaya Wongteanchai (Thailand) Varunya Wongteanchai; 6–3, 4–6, [10–8]	(Thailand) Luksika Kumkhum (Thailand) Tamarine Tanasugarn	(Thailand) Varatchaya Wongteanchai (Japan) Akiko Omae	(South Africa) Chanel Simmonds (Japan) Kanae Hisami (Chinese Taipei) Lee Pei-chi (Thailand) Nudnida Luangnam
July 7	Balıkesir, Turkey; Hard $10,000; Singles and doubles draws	(Belgium) Klaartje Liebens; 6–2, 6–2	(France) Lou Brouleau	(Russia) Margarita Lazareva (Bulgaria) Julia Stamatova	(Romania) Cristina Adamescu (Norway) Emma Flood (Sweden) Anette Munozova (Greece) Agni Stefanou
July 7	Balıkesir, Turkey; Hard $10,000; Singles and doubles draws	(France) Lou Brouleau (Sweden) Anette Munozova; 6–4, 6–2	(Russia) Violetta Degtiareva (Russia) Victoria Vorontsova	(Russia) Margarita Lazareva (Bulgaria) Julia Stamatova	(Romania) Cristina Adamescu (Norway) Emma Flood (Sweden) Anette Munozova (Greece) Agni Stefanou
July 14	ITS Cup; Olomouc, Czech Republic; Clay $50,000; Singles – Doubles	(Czech Republic) Petra Cetkovská; 3–6, 6–1, 6–4	(Czech Republic) Denisa Allertová	(Czech Republic) Barbora Krejčíková (Switzerland) Lara Michel	(Georgia (country)) Sofia Shapatava (Czech Republic) Renata Voráčová (Italy) Alberta Brianti (Ukraine) Lesia Tsurenko
July 14	ITS Cup; Olomouc, Czech Republic; Clay $50,000; Singles – Doubles	(Czech Republic) Petra Cetkovská (Czech Republic) Renata Voráčová; 6–2, 4–6, [10–7]	(Czech Republic) Barbora Krejčíková (Serbia) Aleksandra Krunić	(Czech Republic) Barbora Krejčíková (Switzerland) Lara Michel	(Georgia (country)) Sofia Shapatava (Czech Republic) Renata Voráčová (Italy) Alberta Brianti (Ukraine) Lesia Tsurenko
July 14	USTA Player Development Classic; Carson, United States; Hard $50,000; Singles – Doubles	(United States) Nicole Gibbs; 6–4, 6–4	(United States) Melanie Oudin	(United States) Sanaz Marand (United States) Louisa Chirico	(Japan) Risa Ozaki (United States) Julia Boserup (United States) Maria Sanchez (Belgium) An-Sophie Mestach
July 14	USTA Player Development Classic; Carson, United States; Hard $50,000; Singles – Doubles	(Netherlands) Michaëlla Krajicek (Australia) Olivia Rogowska; 7–6^{(7–4)}, 6–1	(United States) Samantha Crawford (United States) Sachia Vickery	(United States) Sanaz Marand (United States) Louisa Chirico	(Japan) Risa Ozaki (United States) Julia Boserup (United States) Maria Sanchez (Belgium) An-Sophie Mestach
July 14	Challenger Banque Nationale de Granby; Granby, Canada; Hard $25,000; Singles – Doubles	(Japan) Miharu Imanishi; 6–4, 6–4	(France) Stéphanie Foretz	(France) Julie Coin (Canada) Françoise Abanda	(Japan) Eri Hozumi (Canada) Stéphanie Dubois (Japan) Riko Sawayanagi (Japan) Hiroko Kuwata
July 14	Challenger Banque Nationale de Granby; Granby, Canada; Hard $25,000; Singles – Doubles	(Japan) Hiroko Kuwata (Japan) Riko Sawayanagi; Walkover	(Canada) Erin Routliffe (Canada) Carol Zhao	(France) Julie Coin (Canada) Françoise Abanda	(Japan) Eri Hozumi (Canada) Stéphanie Dubois (Japan) Riko Sawayanagi (Japan) Hiroko Kuwata
July 14	Darmstadt, Germany; Clay $25,000; Singles and doubles draws	(Romania) Andreea Mitu; 6–2, 6–1	(Switzerland) Viktorija Golubic	(Russia) Irina Khromacheva (France) Mathilde Johansson	(Germany) Katharina Gerlach (Georgia (country)) Ekaterine Gorgodze (Brazil) Paula Cristina Gonçalves (Russia) Vitalia Diatchenko
July 14	Darmstadt, Germany; Clay $25,000; Singles and doubles draws	(Germany) Nicola Geuer (Switzerland) Viktorija Golubic; 5–7, 6–2, [10–3]	(Germany) Carolin Daniels (Germany) Laura Schaeder	(Russia) Irina Khromacheva (France) Mathilde Johansson	(Germany) Katharina Gerlach (Georgia (country)) Ekaterine Gorgodze (Brazil) Paula Cristina Gonçalves (Russia) Vitalia Diatchenko
July 14	Phuket, Thailand; Hard (indoor) $25,000; Singles and doubles draws	(China) Wang Yafan; 3–6, 6–2, 7–5	(China) Xu Yifan	(Thailand) Varatchaya Wongteanchai (Chinese Taipei) Lee Ya-hsuan	(Chinese Taipei) Chang Kai-chen (Chinese Taipei) Chan Yung-jan (Hong Kong) Zhang Ling (South Korea) Yoo Mi
July 14	Phuket, Thailand; Hard (indoor) $25,000; Singles and doubles draws	(South Korea) Han Na-lae (South Korea) Yoo Mi; 6–4, 6–3	(Japan) Akari Inoue (Chinese Taipei) Lee Ya-hsuan	(Thailand) Varatchaya Wongteanchai (Chinese Taipei) Lee Ya-hsuan	(Chinese Taipei) Chang Kai-chen (Chinese Taipei) Chan Yung-jan (Hong Kong) Zhang Ling (South Korea) Yoo Mi
July 14	Imola, Italy; Carpet $15,000; Singles and doubles draws	(United Kingdom) Katy Dunne; 6–1, 6–3	(Israel) Deniz Khazaniuk	(United Kingdom) Katie Boulter (France) Océane Dodin	(Italy) Jasmine Paolini (Italy) Alice Matteucci (United Kingdom) Amanda Carreras (Italy) Martina Di Giuseppe
July 14	Imola, Italy; Carpet $15,000; Singles and doubles draws	(United Kingdom) Katie Boulter (United Kingdom) Katy Dunne; 7–6^{(10–8)}, 6–3	(Italy) Anna Remondina (Switzerland) Lisa Sabino	(United Kingdom) Katie Boulter (France) Océane Dodin	(Italy) Jasmine Paolini (Italy) Alice Matteucci (United Kingdom) Amanda Carreras (Italy) Martina Di Giuseppe
July 14	Knokke, Belgium; Clay $10,000; Singles and doubles draws	(Netherlands) Quirine Lemoine; 6–1, 6–0	(Netherlands) Kelly Versteeg	(Belgium) Steffi Distelmans (France) Estelle Cascino	(France) Audrey Albié (Greece) Valentini Grammatikopoulou (Belgium) Margaux Brabant (Spain) Aliona Bolsova Zadoinov
July 14	Knokke, Belgium; Clay $10,000; Singles and doubles draws	(Spain) Aliona Bolsova Zadoinov (Chile) Cecilia Costa Melgar; 4–6, 6–3, [10–4]	(Belgium) Justine De Sutter (Belgium) Sofie Oyen	(Belgium) Steffi Distelmans (France) Estelle Cascino	(France) Audrey Albié (Greece) Valentini Grammatikopoulou (Belgium) Margaux Brabant (Spain) Aliona Bolsova Zadoinov
July 14	Vancouver, Canada; Hard $10,000; Singles and doubles draws	(United States) Alexa Guarachi; 6–3, 1–6, 7–6^{(8–6)}	(Japan) Yuka Higuchi	(Canada) Petra Januskova (United States) Lauren Albanese	(United States) Dasha Ivanova (Japan) Hirono Watanabe (United States) Jessica Failla (Canada) Ayan Broomfield
July 14	Vancouver, Canada; Hard $10,000; Singles and doubles draws	(Japan) Yuka Higuchi (Japan) Hirono Watanabe; 4–6, 6–2, [10–5]	(United States) Lauren Albanese (United States) Alexa Guarachi	(Canada) Petra Januskova (United States) Lauren Albanese	(United States) Dasha Ivanova (Japan) Hirono Watanabe (United States) Jessica Failla (Canada) Ayan Broomfield
July 14	Sharm el-Sheikh, Egypt; Hard $10,000; Singles and doubles draws	(Greece) Despoina Vogasari; 7–5, 6–0	(Ukraine) Valeriya Strakhova	(United States) Alexandria Stiteler (South Africa) Ilze Hattingh	(Egypt) Ola Abou Zekry (Italy) Valeria Prosperi (Hungary) Naomi Totka (Serbia) Vojislava Lukić
July 14	Sharm el-Sheikh, Egypt; Hard $10,000; Singles and doubles draws	(France) Clothilde de Bernardi (South Africa) Michelle Sammons; 7–5, 7–5	(Italy) Giulia Bruzzone (Russia) Alina Mikheeva	(United States) Alexandria Stiteler (South Africa) Ilze Hattingh	(Egypt) Ola Abou Zekry (Italy) Valeria Prosperi (Hungary) Naomi Totka (Serbia) Vojislava Lukić
July 14	Galați, Romania; Clay $10,000; Singles and doubles draws	(Romania) Patricia Maria Țig; 7–6^{(7–3)}, 3–6, 6–2	(Romania) Irina Maria Bara	(Romania) Ioana Loredana Roșca (Romania) Andreea Ghițescu	(Romania) Gabriela Talabă (Romania) Elena Bogdan (Italy) Martina Spigarelli (France) Alice Bacquié
July 14	Galați, Romania; Clay $10,000; Singles and doubles draws	(Russia) Ekaterina Lavrikova (Italy) Alessia Piran; 7–5, 1–6, [10–4]	(Romania) Nicoleta-Cătălina Dascălu (Romania) Cristina Ene	(Romania) Ioana Loredana Roșca (Romania) Andreea Ghițescu	(Romania) Gabriela Talabă (Romania) Elena Bogdan (Italy) Martina Spigarelli (France) Alice Bacquié
July 14	Evansville, United States; Hard $10,000; Singles and doubles draws	(United States) Tornado Alicia Black; 6–4, 4–6, 6–2	(United States) Caitlin Whoriskey	(Japan) Ayaka Okuno (United States) Josie Kuhlman	(United States) Kaitlyn McCarthy (Moldova) Alexandra Perper (United States) Marie Norris (United States) Brooke Austin
July 14	Evansville, United States; Hard $10,000; Singles and doubles draws	(United States) Brooke Austin (United States) Natalie Pluskota; 6–4, 3–6, [11–9]	(United States) Catherine Harrison (United States) Mary Weatherholt	(Japan) Ayaka Okuno (United States) Josie Kuhlman	(United States) Kaitlyn McCarthy (Moldova) Alexandra Perper (United States) Marie Norris (United States) Brooke Austin
July 21	President's Cup; Astana, Kazakhstan; Hard $100,000; Singles – Doubles	(Russia) Vitalia Diatchenko; 6–4, 3–6, 6–2	(Turkey) Çağla Büyükakçay	(Germany) Anna-Lena Friedsam (Uzbekistan) Akgul Amanmuradova	(Russia) Margarita Gasparyan (Russia) Polina Vinogradova (Russia) Veronika Kudermetova (Croatia) Ana Savić
July 21	President's Cup; Astana, Kazakhstan; Hard $100,000; Singles – Doubles	(Russia) Vitalia Diatchenko (Russia) Margarita Gasparyan; 6–4, 6–1	(Belgium) Michaela Boev (Germany) Anna-Lena Friedsam	(Germany) Anna-Lena Friedsam (Uzbekistan) Akgul Amanmuradova	(Russia) Margarita Gasparyan (Russia) Polina Vinogradova (Russia) Veronika Kudermetova (Croatia) Ana Savić
July 21	Powiat Poznański Open; Sobota, Poland; Clay $50,000+H; Singles – Doubles	(Slovakia) Kristína Kučová; 1–6, 7–5, 6–3	(Kazakhstan) Sesil Karatantcheva	(Liechtenstein) Stephanie Vogt (Czech Republic) Renata Voráčová	(Italy) Giulia Gatto-Monticone (Romania) Andreea Mitu (Ukraine) Maryna Zanevska (Switzerland) Lara Michel
July 21	Powiat Poznański Open; Sobota, Poland; Clay $50,000+H; Singles – Doubles	(Czech Republic) Barbora Krejčíková (Serbia) Aleksandra Krunić; 3–6, 6–0, [10–6]	(Ukraine) Anastasiya Vasylyeva (Ukraine) Maryna Zanevska	(Liechtenstein) Stephanie Vogt (Czech Republic) Renata Voráčová	(Italy) Giulia Gatto-Monticone (Romania) Andreea Mitu (Ukraine) Maryna Zanevska (Switzerland) Lara Michel
July 21	Kentucky Bank Tennis Championships; Lexington, United States; Hard $50,000; Singles – Doubles	(United States) Madison Brengle; 6–3, 6–4	(United States) Nicole Gibbs	(United States) Irina Falconi (United States) Melanie Oudin	(Australia) Jarmila Gajdošová (Japan) Nao Hibino (United States) Maria Sanchez (Switzerland) Romina Oprandi
July 21	Kentucky Bank Tennis Championships; Lexington, United States; Hard $50,000; Singles – Doubles	(United Kingdom) Jocelyn Rae (United Kingdom) Anna Smith; 6–4, 6–4	(Japan) Shuko Aoyama (United States) Keri Wong	(United States) Irina Falconi (United States) Melanie Oudin	(Australia) Jarmila Gajdošová (Japan) Nao Hibino (United States) Maria Sanchez (Switzerland) Romina Oprandi
July 21	Phuket, Thailand; Hard (indoor) $25,000; Singles and doubles draws	(South Korea) Yoo Mi; 6–4, 6–2	(Slovakia) Zuzana Zlochová	(South Korea) Han Na-lae (Uzbekistan) Sabina Sharipova	(Chinese Taipei) Chang Kai-chen (Thailand) Varatchaya Wongteanchai (Serbia) Doroteja Erić (China) Lu Jiajing
July 21	Phuket, Thailand; Hard (indoor) $25,000; Singles and doubles draws	(Thailand) Nicha Lertpitaksinchai (Thailand) Peangtarn Plipuech; 6–3, 6–7^{(5–7)}, [11–9]	(South Korea) Han Na-lae (South Korea) Yoo Mi	(South Korea) Han Na-lae (Uzbekistan) Sabina Sharipova	(Chinese Taipei) Chang Kai-chen (Thailand) Varatchaya Wongteanchai (Serbia) Doroteja Erić (China) Lu Jiajing
July 21	Campos do Jordão, Brazil; Hard $15,000; Singles and doubles draws	(Brazil) Gabriela Cé; 6–3, 6–2	(Brazil) Eduarda Piai	(Argentina) Guadalupe Pérez Rojas (Mexico) Ana Sofía Sánchez	(Brazil) Nathaly Kurata (Chile) Andrea Koch Benvenuto (Brazil) Nathália Rossi (Brazil) Julia Mansano Gomide
July 21	Campos do Jordão, Brazil; Hard $15,000; Singles and doubles draws	(Brazil) Nathaly Kurata (Brazil) Giovanna Tomita; 6–3, 6–2	(Brazil) Carolina Alves (Brazil) Ingrid Gamarra Martins	(Argentina) Guadalupe Pérez Rojas (Mexico) Ana Sofía Sánchez	(Brazil) Nathaly Kurata (Chile) Andrea Koch Benvenuto (Brazil) Nathália Rossi (Brazil) Julia Mansano Gomide
July 21	Bad Waltersdorf, Austria; Clay $10,000; Singles and doubles draws	(Austria) Barbara Haas; 7–6^{(8–6)}, 6–3	(Croatia) Iva Mekovec	(Germany) Natalie Pröse (Austria) Pia König	(Hungary) Réka-Luca Jani (Austria) Anna Maria Heil (Croatia) Jana Fett (Czech Republic) Zuzana Zálabská
July 21	Bad Waltersdorf, Austria; Clay $10,000; Singles and doubles draws	(Austria) Pia König (Slovenia) Polona Reberšak; 6–7^{(4–7)}, 7–5, [14–12]	(Czech Republic) Kristýna Hrabalová (Czech Republic) Tereza Janatová	(Germany) Natalie Pröse (Austria) Pia König	(Hungary) Réka-Luca Jani (Austria) Anna Maria Heil (Croatia) Jana Fett (Czech Republic) Zuzana Zálabská
July 21	Maaseik, Belgium; Clay $10,000; Singles and doubles draws	(Netherlands) Quirine Lemoine; 6–1, 6–3	(Netherlands) Bernice van de Velde	(Netherlands) Demi Schuurs (Chile) Cecilia Costa Melgar	(France) Manon Arcangioli (Belgium) Magali Kempen (Netherlands) Kim Rus (France) Estelle Cascino
July 21	Maaseik, Belgium; Clay $10,000; Singles and doubles draws	(Belgium) Steffi Distelmans (Belgium) Magali Kempen; 6–4, 6–3	(Netherlands) Bernice van de Velde (Netherlands) Kelly Versteeg	(Netherlands) Demi Schuurs (Chile) Cecilia Costa Melgar	(France) Manon Arcangioli (Belgium) Magali Kempen (Netherlands) Kim Rus (France) Estelle Cascino
July 21	Sharm el-Sheikh, Egypt; Hard $10,000; Singles and doubles draws	(Ukraine) Valeriya Strakhova; 6–3, 6–2	(France) Pauline Payet	(Sweden) Brenda Njuki (United Kingdom) Naomi Cavaday	(Japan) Nagi Hanatani (Russia) Anastasia Shaulskaya (United Kingdom) Danielle Konotoptseva (South Africa) Ilze Hattingh
July 21	Sharm el-Sheikh, Egypt; Hard $10,000; Singles and doubles draws	(South Africa) Ilze Hattingh (South Africa) Madrie Le Roux; 6–1, 7–6^{(7–3)}	(Russia) Alina Mikheeva (Germany) Linda Prenkovic	(Sweden) Brenda Njuki (United Kingdom) Naomi Cavaday	(Japan) Nagi Hanatani (Russia) Anastasia Shaulskaya (United Kingdom) Danielle Konotoptseva (South Africa) Ilze Hattingh
July 21	Tallinn, Estonia; Clay $10,000; Singles and doubles draws	(Hungary) Csilla Argyelán; 7–6^{(7–3)}, 2–6, 7–5	(Russia) Alexandra Artamonova	(Latvia) Laura Gulbe (Russia) Anastasia Frolova	(France) Amandine Cazeaux (Latvia) Anastasija Homutova (France) Laëtitia Sarrazin (Belarus) Sadafmoh Tolibova
July 21	Tallinn, Estonia; Clay $10,000; Singles and doubles draws	(Russia) Alexandra Artamonova (Sweden) Cornelia Lister; 6–3, 6–2	(Estonia) Julia Matojan (Estonia) Eva Paalma	(Latvia) Laura Gulbe (Russia) Anastasia Frolova	(France) Amandine Cazeaux (Latvia) Anastasija Homutova (France) Laëtitia Sarrazin (Belarus) Sadafmoh Tolibova
July 21	Tampere Open; Tampere, Finland; Clay $10,000; Singles – Doubles	(Greece) Maria Sakkari; 6–4, 7–5	(Russia) Anastasia Pivovarova	(Sweden) Beatrice Cedermark (Australia) Alexandra Nancarrow	(Russia) Liubov Vasilyeva (Greece) Angeliki Kairi (Italy) Deborah Chiesa (Finland) Emma Laine
July 21	Tampere Open; Tampere, Finland; Clay $10,000; Singles – Doubles	(Australia) Alexandra Nancarrow (Greece) Maria Sakkari; 6–2, 6–3	(Finland) Emma Laine (Russia) Anastasia Pivovarova	(Sweden) Beatrice Cedermark (Australia) Alexandra Nancarrow	(Russia) Liubov Vasilyeva (Greece) Angeliki Kairi (Italy) Deborah Chiesa (Finland) Emma Laine
July 21	Les Contamines-Montjoie, France; Hard $10,000; Singles and doubles draws	(Spain) Aliona Bolsova Zadoinov; 3–6, 6–3, 6–0	(Germany) Tayisiya Morderger	(United Kingdom) Katie Boulter (France) Chloé Paquet	(United Kingdom) Katy Dunne (France) Josepha Adam (France) Harmony Tan (United Kingdom) Francesca Stephenson
July 21	Les Contamines-Montjoie, France; Hard $10,000; Singles and doubles draws	(Spain) Aliona Bolsova Zadoinov (France) Carla Touly; 6–1, 6–1	(Italy) Sara Castellano (Italy) Chiara Quattrone	(United Kingdom) Katie Boulter (France) Chloé Paquet	(United Kingdom) Katy Dunne (France) Josepha Adam (France) Harmony Tan (United Kingdom) Francesca Stephenson
July 21	Horb am Neckar, Germany; Clay $10,000; Singles and doubles draws	(Czech Republic) Petra Krejsová; 7–5, 7–5	(Czech Republic) Jesika Malečková	(Argentina) Victoria Bosio (Germany) Carolin Daniels	(Sweden) Hilda Melander (Serbia) Natalija Kostić (Brazil) Beatriz Haddad Maia (Czech Republic) Barbora Štefková
July 21	Horb am Neckar, Germany; Clay $10,000; Singles and doubles draws	(Sweden) Hilda Melander (Czech Republic) Barbora Štefková; 6–4, 6–1	(Germany) Carolin Daniels (Germany) Laura Schaeder	(Argentina) Victoria Bosio (Germany) Carolin Daniels	(Sweden) Hilda Melander (Serbia) Natalija Kostić (Brazil) Beatriz Haddad Maia (Czech Republic) Barbora Štefková
July 21	New Delhi, India; Hard $10,000; Singles and doubles draws	(South Korea) Kim Dabin; 6–1, 6–3	(Hong Kong) Katherine Ip	(Japan) Kanami Tsuji (India) Karman Kaur Thandi	(India) Vaniya Dangwal (India) Sai Samhitha Chamarthi (India) Shweta Rana (India) Simran Kaur Sethi
July 21	New Delhi, India; Hard $10,000; Singles and doubles draws	(India) Rutuja Bhosale (South Korea) Kim Dabin; 6–2, 7–6^{(7–2)}	(India) Nidhi Chilumula (South Korea) Han Sung-hee	(Japan) Kanami Tsuji (India) Karman Kaur Thandi	(India) Vaniya Dangwal (India) Sai Samhitha Chamarthi (India) Shweta Rana (India) Simran Kaur Sethi
July 21	Viserba, Italy; Clay $10,000; Singles and doubles draws	(Italy) Jasmine Paolini; 6–1, 6–0	(Italy) Anna Remondina	(Germany) Anne Schäfer (Switzerland) Tess Sugnaux	(Italy) Corinna Dentoni (Italy) Alice Balducci (Italy) Cristiana Ferrando (Greece) Despina Papamichail
July 21	Viserba, Italy; Clay $10,000; Singles and doubles draws	(Germany) Luisa Marie Huber (Poland) Natalia Siedliska; 6–3, 6–4	(Italy) Georgia Brescia (Italy) Cristiana Ferrando	(Germany) Anne Schäfer (Switzerland) Tess Sugnaux	(Italy) Corinna Dentoni (Italy) Alice Balducci (Italy) Cristiana Ferrando (Greece) Despina Papamichail
July 21	Palić, Serbia; Clay $10,000; Singles and doubles draws	(Ukraine) Elizaveta Ianchuk; 6–7^{(11–13)}, 7–5, 6–4	(Hungary) Ágnes Bukta	(Romania) Irina Maria Bara (Czech Republic) Martina Kubičíková	(Bosnia and Herzegovina) Ema Burgić (Serbia) Barbara Bonić (Slovakia) Natália Vajdová (Czech Republic) Tereza Malíková
July 21	Palić, Serbia; Clay $10,000; Singles and doubles draws	(North Macedonia) Lina Gjorcheska (Ukraine) Elizaveta Ianchuk; 6–4, 6–1	(Romania) Irina Maria Bara (Romania) Camelia Hristea	(Romania) Irina Maria Bara (Czech Republic) Martina Kubičíková	(Bosnia and Herzegovina) Ema Burgić (Serbia) Barbara Bonić (Slovakia) Natália Vajdová (Czech Republic) Tereza Malíková
July 21	Valladolid, Spain; Hard $10,000; Singles and doubles draws	(Spain) Laura Pous Tió; 4–6, 7–5, 6–2	(France) Océane Dodin	(Spain) Nuria Párrizas Díaz (Spain) Estela Pérez Somarriba	(Spain) Yvonne Cavallé Reimers (Spain) Arabela Fernández Rabener (France) Jessika Ponchet (United Kingdom) Manisha Foster
July 21	Valladolid, Spain; Hard $10,000; Singles and doubles draws	(Spain) María del Rosario Cañero Pérez (Spain) Paula del Cueto Castillo; 6–3, 6–7^{(2–7)}, [10–2]	(Spain) Paula Comella Aguiló (Spain) Aina Schaffner Riera	(Spain) Nuria Párrizas Díaz (Spain) Estela Pérez Somarriba	(Spain) Yvonne Cavallé Reimers (Spain) Arabela Fernández Rabener (France) Jessika Ponchet (United Kingdom) Manisha Foster
July 21	Istanbul, Turkey; Hard $10,000; Singles and doubles draws	(France) Lou Brouleau; 6–3, 6–1	(France) Caroline Roméo	(Russia) Anastasiya Saitova (China) Gao Xinyu	(Turkey) Başak Eraydın (Italy) Valeria Prosperi (Norway) Emma Flood (Bulgaria) Isabella Shinikova
July 21	Istanbul, Turkey; Hard $10,000; Singles and doubles draws	(Norway) Emma Flood (Netherlands) Nikki Luttikhuis; 7–6^{(7–5)}, 2–6, [10–6]	(China) Gao Xinyu (China) Ye Qiuyu	(Russia) Anastasiya Saitova (China) Gao Xinyu	(Turkey) Başak Eraydın (Italy) Valeria Prosperi (Norway) Emma Flood (Bulgaria) Isabella Shinikova
July 21	Austin, United States; Hard $10,000; Singles and doubles draws	(United States) Kelly Chen; 6–3, 7–6^{(9–7)}	(United States) Mary Weatherholt	(United States) Usue Maitane Arconada (Australia) Nives Baric	(Russia) Ksenia Lykina (United States) Alexandra Cercone (United States) Alexa Guarachi (Japan) Yuka Higuchi
July 21	Austin, United States; Hard $10,000; Singles and doubles draws	(United States) Catherine Harrison (United States) Mary Weatherholt; 6–2, 7–5	(United States) Alexandra Cercone (United States) Alexa Guarachi	(United States) Usue Maitane Arconada (Australia) Nives Baric	(Russia) Ksenia Lykina (United States) Alexandra Cercone (United States) Alexa Guarachi (Japan) Yuka Higuchi
July 28	Odlum Brown Vancouver Open; Vancouver, Canada; Hard $100,000; Singles – Doubles	(Australia) Jarmila Gajdošová; 3–6, 6–2, 7–6^{(7–3)}	(Ukraine) Lesia Tsurenko	(United States) Asia Muhammad (United States) Madison Brengle	(Hungary) Tímea Babos (United States) Jennifer Brady (United States) Anna Tatishvili (France) Irena Pavlovic
July 28	Odlum Brown Vancouver Open; Vancouver, Canada; Hard $100,000; Singles – Doubles	(United States) Asia Muhammad (United States) Maria Sanchez; 6–3, 1–6, [10–8]	(United States) Jamie Loeb (United States) Allie Will	(United States) Asia Muhammad (United States) Madison Brengle	(Hungary) Tímea Babos (United States) Jennifer Brady (United States) Anna Tatishvili (France) Irena Pavlovic
July 28	ITF Women's Circuit – Wuhan; Wuhan, China; Hard $50,000; Singles – Doubles	(China) Wang Qiang; 6–2, 6–2	(Thailand) Luksika Kumkhum	(China) Wang Yafan (Japan) Miyu Kato	(Hong Kong) Zhang Ling (China) Zhang Kailin (China) Tian Ran (China) Han Xinyun
July 28	ITF Women's Circuit – Wuhan; Wuhan, China; Hard $50,000; Singles – Doubles	(China) Han Xinyun (China) Zhang Kailin; 6–4, 6–2	(Japan) Miyu Kato (Japan) Makoto Ninomiya	(China) Wang Yafan (Japan) Miyu Kato	(Hong Kong) Zhang Ling (China) Zhang Kailin (China) Tian Ran (China) Han Xinyun
July 28	Plzeň, Czech Republic; Clay $25,000; Singles and doubles draws	(Czech Republic) Denisa Allertová; 6–1, 6–1	(Ukraine) Anastasiya Vasylyeva	(Russia) Ksenia Pervak (Netherlands) Richèl Hogenkamp	(Croatia) Ema Mikulčić (Bulgaria) Elitsa Kostova (Hungary) Melinda Czink (Netherlands) Lesley Kerkhove
July 28	Plzeň, Czech Republic; Clay $25,000; Singles and doubles draws	(Austria) Sandra Klemenschits (Czech Republic) Renata Voráčová; 6–4, 7–5	(Belarus) Lidziya Marozava (Ukraine) Anastasiya Vasylyeva	(Russia) Ksenia Pervak (Netherlands) Richèl Hogenkamp	(Croatia) Ema Mikulčić (Bulgaria) Elitsa Kostova (Hungary) Melinda Czink (Netherlands) Lesley Kerkhove
July 28	Bad Saulgau, Germany; Clay $25,000; Singles and doubles draws	(Ukraine) Maryna Zanevska; 6–0, 6–4	(Brazil) Gabriela Cé	(Netherlands) Cindy Burger (Ukraine) Anhelina Kalinina	(Sweden) Rebecca Peterson (Germany) Antonia Lottner (Germany) Kristina Barrois (Brazil) Beatriz Haddad Maia
July 28	Bad Saulgau, Germany; Clay $25,000; Singles and doubles draws	(Romania) Diana Buzean (Spain) Arabela Fernández Rabener; 7–5, 6–3	(Sweden) Hilda Melander (Sweden) Rebecca Peterson	(Netherlands) Cindy Burger (Ukraine) Anhelina Kalinina	(Sweden) Rebecca Peterson (Germany) Antonia Lottner (Germany) Kristina Barrois (Brazil) Beatriz Haddad Maia
July 28	Santa Cruz de la Sierra, Bolivia; Clay $10,000; Singles and doubles draws	(Chile) Andrea Koch Benvenuto; 6–2, 7–5	(Argentina) Julieta Lara Estable	(Paraguay) Sara Giménez (Argentina) Sofía Luini	(Argentina) Carla Lucero (Argentina) Guadalupe Pérez Rojas (Brazil) Carolina Alves (Chile) Ivania Martinich
July 28	Santa Cruz de la Sierra, Bolivia; Clay $10,000; Singles and doubles draws	(Paraguay) Sara Giménez (Bolivia) Noelia Zeballos; 6–7^{(3–7)}, 6–4, [10–8]	(Argentina) Sofía Luini (Argentina) Guadalupe Pérez Rojas	(Paraguay) Sara Giménez (Argentina) Sofía Luini	(Argentina) Carla Lucero (Argentina) Guadalupe Pérez Rojas (Brazil) Carolina Alves (Chile) Ivania Martinich
July 28	Copenhagen, Denmark; Clay $10,000; Singles and doubles draws	(Denmark) Mai Grage; 6–4, 7–5	(Denmark) Karen Barbat	(Slovakia) Klaudia Boczová (Denmark) Julie Noe	(Germany) Katharina Holert (Philippines) Katharina Lehnert (Greece) Angeliki Kairi (Norway) Emma Flood
July 28	Copenhagen, Denmark; Clay $10,000; Singles and doubles draws	(Denmark) Karen Barbat (Slovakia) Klaudia Boczová; 6–4, 6–1	(Denmark) Emilie Francati (Denmark) Maria Jespersen	(Slovakia) Klaudia Boczová (Denmark) Julie Noe	(Germany) Katharina Holert (Philippines) Katharina Lehnert (Greece) Angeliki Kairi (Norway) Emma Flood
July 28	Sharm el-Sheikh, Egypt; Hard $10,000; Singles and doubles draws	(Ukraine) Valeriya Strakhova; 6–2, 6–3	(Slovenia) Natalija Šipek	(Romania) Elena-Teodora Cadar (Hungary) Naomi Totka	(South Africa) Michelle Sammons (Russia) Alina Mikheeva (Sweden) Brenda Njuki (China) Li Yixuan
July 28	Sharm el-Sheikh, Egypt; Hard $10,000; Singles and doubles draws	(Spain) Yvonne Cavallé Reimers (Russia) Alina Mikheeva; 6–3, 7–5	(Germany) Linda Prenkovic (Hungary) Naomi Totka	(Romania) Elena-Teodora Cadar (Hungary) Naomi Totka	(South Africa) Michelle Sammons (Russia) Alina Mikheeva (Sweden) Brenda Njuki (China) Li Yixuan
July 28	Savitaipale, Finland; Clay $10,000; Singles and doubles draws	(Finland) Emma Laine; 6–3, 5–7, 6–0	(Greece) Maria Sakkari	(Sweden) Eveliina Virtanen (Australia) Alexandra Nancarrow	(Ukraine) Diana Bogoliy (Russia) Liubov Vasilyeva (Ukraine) Gyulnara Nazarova (Russia) Sofia Smagina
July 28	Savitaipale, Finland; Clay $10,000; Singles and doubles draws	(Ukraine) Diana Bogoliy (Finland) Emma Laine; 6–4, 7–6^{(7–2)}	(Australia) Alexandra Nancarrow (Greece) Maria Sakkari	(Sweden) Eveliina Virtanen (Australia) Alexandra Nancarrow	(Ukraine) Diana Bogoliy (Russia) Liubov Vasilyeva (Ukraine) Gyulnara Nazarova (Russia) Sofia Smagina
July 28	Telavi, Georgia; Clay $10,000; Singles and doubles draws	(Georgia (country)) Mariam Bolkvadze; 1–2, ret.	(Russia) Yuliya Kalabina	(Russia) Tamara Pichkhadze (Moldova) Anastasia Vdovenco	(Georgia (country)) Tamar Kutubidze (Australia) Chantelle Rigozzi (Belgium) India Maggen (Israel) Saray Sterenbach
July 28	Telavi, Georgia; Clay $10,000; Singles and doubles draws	(Russia) Yuliya Kalabina (Moldova) Anastasia Vdovenco; 7–6^{(7–4)}, 6–2	(Ukraine) Alona Fomina (Belgium) India Maggen	(Russia) Tamara Pichkhadze (Moldova) Anastasia Vdovenco	(Georgia (country)) Tamar Kutubidze (Australia) Chantelle Rigozzi (Belgium) India Maggen (Israel) Saray Sterenbach
July 28	New Delhi, India; Hard $10,000; Singles and doubles draws	(Thailand) Peangtarn Plipuech; 6–2, 6–4	(India) Natasha Palha	(India) Snehadevi Reddy (India) Karman Kaur Thandi	(Australia) Abbie Myers (China) Wang Xiyao (South Korea) Han Sung-hee (India) Sri Peddi Reddy
July 28	New Delhi, India; Hard $10,000; Singles and doubles draws	(India) Rutuja Bhosale (South Korea) Kim Dabin; 6–3, 6–4	(India) Sharmada Balu (China) Wang Xiyao	(India) Snehadevi Reddy (India) Karman Kaur Thandi	(Australia) Abbie Myers (China) Wang Xiyao (South Korea) Han Sung-hee (India) Sri Peddi Reddy
July 28	Rovereto, Italy; Clay $10,000; Singles and doubles draws	(Spain) Laura Pous Tió; 6–2, 4–6, 6–1	(Switzerland) Lisa Sabino	(Italy) Alice Savoretti (Italy) Martina Di Giuseppe	(Croatia) Iva Primorac (Poland) Natalia Siedliska (Germany) Luisa Marie Huber (Italy) Claudia Coppola
July 28	Rovereto, Italy; Clay $10,000; Singles and doubles draws	(Germany) Luisa Marie Huber (Poland) Natalia Siedliska; 6–4, 6–1	(Switzerland) Lisa Sabino (Italy) Alice Savoretti	(Italy) Alice Savoretti (Italy) Martina Di Giuseppe	(Croatia) Iva Primorac (Poland) Natalia Siedliska (Germany) Luisa Marie Huber (Italy) Claudia Coppola
July 28	Astana, Kazakhstan; Hard $10,000; Singles and doubles draws	(Ukraine) Alyona Sotnikova; 5–7, 6–4, 6–1	(Ukraine) Anna Shkudun	(Kyrgyzstan) Ksenia Palkina (Russia) Polina Monova	(Russia) Eugeniya Pashkova (Uzbekistan) Vlada Ekshibarova (Ukraine) Olga Ianchuk (Belarus) Sviatlana Pirazhenka
July 28	Astana, Kazakhstan; Hard $10,000; Singles and doubles draws	(Russia) Polina Monova (Russia) Ekaterina Yashina; 6–3, 6–2	(Belarus) Polina Pekhova (Belarus) Sviatlana Pirazhenka	(Kyrgyzstan) Ksenia Palkina (Russia) Polina Monova	(Russia) Eugeniya Pashkova (Uzbekistan) Vlada Ekshibarova (Ukraine) Olga Ianchuk (Belarus) Sviatlana Pirazhenka
July 28	Timișoara, Romania; Clay $10,000; Singles and doubles draws	(Italy) Martina Spigarelli; 6–4, 6–4	(Romania) Cristina Ene	(Romania) Raluca Elena Platon (Romania) Irina Maria Bara	(Romania) Camelia Hristea (Romania) Andreea Amalia Roșca (Romania) Nicoleta-Cătălina Dascălu (Serbia) Dejana Radanović
July 28	Timișoara, Romania; Clay $10,000; Singles and doubles draws	(Serbia) Katarina Adamović (North Macedonia) Lina Gjorcheska; 6–2, 7–5	(Romania) Raluca Elena Platon (Romania) Cristina Stancu	(Romania) Raluca Elena Platon (Romania) Irina Maria Bara	(Romania) Camelia Hristea (Romania) Andreea Amalia Roșca (Romania) Nicoleta-Cătălina Dascălu (Serbia) Dejana Radanović
July 28	Michalovce, Slovakia; Clay $10,000; Singles and doubles draws	(Czech Republic) Karolína Muchová; 6–3, 6–1	(Slovakia) Jana Jablonovská	(Czech Republic) Nina Holanová (Slovakia) Barbara Kötelesová	(Austria) Anna Maria Heil (Slovakia) Vivien Juhászová (Russia) Maria Marfutina (Slovakia) Nikola Vajdová
July 28	Michalovce, Slovakia; Clay $10,000; Singles and doubles draws	(Czech Republic) Karolína Čechová (Czech Republic) Nikola Horáková; 7–6^{(7–4)}, 6–3	(Netherlands) Anna Katalina Alzate Esmurzaeva (Slovakia) Lenka Wienerová	(Czech Republic) Nina Holanová (Slovakia) Barbara Kötelesová	(Austria) Anna Maria Heil (Slovakia) Vivien Juhászová (Russia) Maria Marfutina (Slovakia) Nikola Vajdová
July 28	Istanbul, Turkey; Hard $10,000; Singles and doubles draws	(Ukraine) Olga Fridman; 7–5, 6–4	(China) Ye Qiuyu	(China) Wang Yan (Turkey) Melis Sezer	(Turkey) Başak Eraydın (Bulgaria) Isabella Shinikova (Russia) Maria Mokh (Bulgaria) Julia Stamatova
July 28	Istanbul, Turkey; Hard $10,000; Singles and doubles draws	(Japan) Mai Minokoshi (Japan) Akiko Omae; 3–6, 6–2, [10–4]	(China) Gao Xinyu (China) You Xiaodi	(China) Wang Yan (Turkey) Melis Sezer	(Turkey) Başak Eraydın (Bulgaria) Isabella Shinikova (Russia) Maria Mokh (Bulgaria) Julia Stamatova
July 28	Fort Worth, United States; Hard $10,000; Singles and doubles draws	(Germany) Tatjana Maria; 6–1, 6–1	(United States) Hayley Carter	(United States) Jessica Ho (Mexico) Giuliana Olmos	(United States) Frances Altick (United States) Mary Weatherholt (Brazil) Maria Fernanda Alves (United States) Alexa Guarachi
July 28	Fort Worth, United States; Hard $10,000; Singles and doubles draws	(United States) Hayley Carter (Singapore) Stefanie Tan; 6–3, 6–3	(United States) Catherine Harrison (United States) Mary Weatherholt	(United States) Jessica Ho (Mexico) Giuliana Olmos	(United States) Frances Altick (United States) Mary Weatherholt (Brazil) Maria Fernanda Alves (United States) Alexa Guarachi

=== August ===
Week of	Tournament	Winner	Runners-up	Semifinalists	Quarterfinalists
August 4	Koksijde, Belgium; Clay $25,000; Singles and doubles draws	(Ukraine) Maryna Zanevska; 6–1, 6–1	(Netherlands) Richèl Hogenkamp	(Ukraine) Sofiya Kovalets (Netherlands) Quirine Lemoine	(Czech Republic) Kateřina Vaňková (India) Ankita Raina (United States) Bernarda Pera (Sweden) Rebecca Peterson
August 4	Koksijde, Belgium; Clay $25,000; Singles and doubles draws	(Belgium) Ysaline Bonaventure (Netherlands) Richèl Hogenkamp; 6–4, 6–4	(United States) Bernarda Pera (Netherlands) Demi Schuurs	(Ukraine) Sofiya Kovalets (Netherlands) Quirine Lemoine	(Czech Republic) Kateřina Vaňková (India) Ankita Raina (United States) Bernarda Pera (Sweden) Rebecca Peterson
August 4	Hechingen, Germany; Clay $25,000; Singles and doubles draws	(Germany) Carina Witthöft; 4–6, 6–4, 6–3	(Germany) Laura Siegemund	(Russia) Valeria Solovyeva (Romania) Ana Bogdan	(Germany) Laura Schaeder (Georgia (country)) Ekaterine Gorgodze (Italy) Giulia Gatto-Monticone (Ukraine) Anhelina Kalinina
August 4	Hechingen, Germany; Clay $25,000; Singles and doubles draws	(Romania) Elena Bogdan (Russia) Valeria Solovyeva; 6–3, 6–1	(Germany) Carolin Daniels (Germany) Antonia Lottner	(Russia) Valeria Solovyeva (Romania) Ana Bogdan	(Germany) Laura Schaeder (Georgia (country)) Ekaterine Gorgodze (Italy) Giulia Gatto-Monticone (Ukraine) Anhelina Kalinina
August 4	Landisville, United States; Hard $25,000; Singles and doubles draws	(Poland) Paula Kania; 5–7, 6–3, 6–4	(Tunisia) Ons Jabeur	(United States) Alexandra Mueller (Slovenia) Petra Rampre	(United States) Maria Sanchez (France) Irena Pavlovic (Japan) Hiroko Kuwata (Australia) Olivia Rogowska
August 4	Landisville, United States; Hard $25,000; Singles and doubles draws	(United States) Jamie Loeb (United States) Sanaz Marand; 7–6^{(7–5)}, 6–1	(United States) Lena Litvak (United States) Alexandra Mueller	(United States) Alexandra Mueller (Slovenia) Petra Rampre	(United States) Maria Sanchez (France) Irena Pavlovic (Japan) Hiroko Kuwata (Australia) Olivia Rogowska
August 4	Caracas, Venezuela; Hard $25,000; Singles and doubles draws	(Argentina) María Irigoyen; 6–1, 6–3	(France) Harmony Tan	(France) Clothilde de Bernardi (Argentina) Florencia Molinero	(Chile) Andrea Koch Benvenuto (Chinese Taipei) Hsu Chieh-yu (United States) Lauren Albanese (Austria) Melanie Klaffner
August 4	Caracas, Venezuela; Hard $25,000; Singles and doubles draws	(Argentina) Vanesa Furlanetto (Argentina) Florencia Molinero; 6–0, 6–0	(France) Clothilde de Bernardi (Japan) Ayaka Okuno	(France) Clothilde de Bernardi (Argentina) Florencia Molinero	(Chile) Andrea Koch Benvenuto (Chinese Taipei) Hsu Chieh-yu (United States) Lauren Albanese (Austria) Melanie Klaffner
August 4	Santa Fe, Argentina; Clay $10,000; Singles and doubles draws	(Chile) Fernanda Brito; 4–6, 6–4, 6–4	(Argentina) Guadalupe Pérez Rojas	(Argentina) Carla Lucero (Argentina) Ailen Crespo Azconzábal	(Argentina) Constanza Vega (Brazil) Carolina Alves (Argentina) Ana Madcur (Brazil) Nathaly Kurata
August 4	Santa Fe, Argentina; Clay $10,000; Singles and doubles draws	(Argentina) Ana Victoria Gobbi Monllau (Argentina) Guadalupe Pérez Rojas; 6–3, 6–2	(Chile) Fernanda Brito (Chile) Camila Silva	(Argentina) Carla Lucero (Argentina) Ailen Crespo Azconzábal	(Argentina) Constanza Vega (Brazil) Carolina Alves (Argentina) Ana Madcur (Brazil) Nathaly Kurata
August 4	Vienna, Austria; Clay $10,000; Singles and doubles draws	(Spain) Laura Pous Tió; 6–7^{(6–8)}, 6–3, 6–1	(Czech Republic) Gabriela Pantůčková	(Italy) Alice Balducci (Slovakia) Lenka Juríková	(Italy) Alice Savoretti (Slovakia) Karin Morgošová (Czech Republic) Diana Šumová (Czech Republic) Kateřina Kramperová
August 4	Vienna, Austria; Clay $10,000; Singles and doubles draws	(Italy) Alice Balducci (Italy) Alice Savoretti; 7–5, 6–0	(Czech Republic) Kristýna Hrabalová (Czech Republic) Tereza Janatová	(Italy) Alice Balducci (Slovakia) Lenka Juríková	(Italy) Alice Savoretti (Slovakia) Karin Morgošová (Czech Republic) Diana Šumová (Czech Republic) Kateřina Kramperová
August 4	Sharm el-Sheikh, Egypt; Hard $10,000; Singles and doubles draws	(Ukraine) Valeriya Strakhova; 6–4, 6–1	(Serbia) Vojislava Lukić	(India) Sowjanya Bavisetti (United Kingdom) Harriet Dart	(Romania) Elena-Teodora Cadar (France) Pauline Payet (Hong Kong) Wu Ho-ching (Spain) Yvonne Cavallé Reimers
August 4	Sharm el-Sheikh, Egypt; Hard $10,000; Singles and doubles draws	(Serbia) Vojislava Lukić (Japan) Haine Ogata; 6–4, 6–2	(United Kingdom) Harriet Dart (New Zealand) Claudia Williams	(India) Sowjanya Bavisetti (United Kingdom) Harriet Dart	(Romania) Elena-Teodora Cadar (France) Pauline Payet (Hong Kong) Wu Ho-ching (Spain) Yvonne Cavallé Reimers
August 4	Telavi, Georgia; Clay $10,000; Singles and doubles draws	(Ukraine) Alona Fomina; 6–4, 6–2	(Israel) Saray Sterenbach	(Armenia) Ani Amiraghyan (Moldova) Anastasia Vdovenco	(Belgium) India Maggen (Slovakia) Lenka Wienerová (Moldova) Daniela Ciobanu (Georgia (country)) Mariam Bolkvadze
August 4	Telavi, Georgia; Clay $10,000; Singles and doubles draws	(Lithuania) Agnė Čepelytė (Lithuania) Justina Mikulskytė; 6–1, 7–5	(Belgium) India Maggen (Slovakia) Lenka Wienerová	(Armenia) Ani Amiraghyan (Moldova) Anastasia Vdovenco	(Belgium) India Maggen (Slovakia) Lenka Wienerová (Moldova) Daniela Ciobanu (Georgia (country)) Mariam Bolkvadze
August 4	Bangalore, India; Hard $10,000; Singles and doubles draws	(Chinese Taipei) Hsu Ching-wen; 6–4, 6–4	(Oman) Fatma Al-Nabhani	(India) Prarthana Thombare (India) Rishika Sunkara	(India) Sai Samhitha Chamarthi (India) Sharmada Balu (India) Sri Peddi Reddy (India) Nidhi Chilumula
August 4	Bangalore, India; Hard $10,000; Singles and doubles draws	(India) Sharmada Balu (India) Prarthana Thombare; 6–4, 0–6, [10–6]	(Chinese Taipei) Hsu Ching-wen (India) Natasha Palha	(India) Prarthana Thombare (India) Rishika Sunkara	(India) Sai Samhitha Chamarthi (India) Sharmada Balu (India) Sri Peddi Reddy (India) Nidhi Chilumula
August 4	Astana, Kazakhstan; Hard $10,000; Singles and doubles draws	(Ukraine) Alyona Sotnikova; 6–4, 6–0	(Ukraine) Anna Shkudun	(Ukraine) Olga Ianchuk (Russia) Eugeniya Pashkova	(Russia) Anna Grigoryan (Russia) Ekaterina Yashina (Uzbekistan) Vlada Ekshibarova (Russia) Yulia Bryzgalova
August 4	Astana, Kazakhstan; Hard $10,000; Singles and doubles draws	(Kyrgyzstan) Ksenia Palkina (Russia) Ekaterina Yashina; 7–5, 6–3	(Hong Kong) Eudice Chong (Russia) Anna Grigoryan	(Ukraine) Olga Ianchuk (Russia) Eugeniya Pashkova	(Russia) Anna Grigoryan (Russia) Ekaterina Yashina (Uzbekistan) Vlada Ekshibarova (Russia) Yulia Bryzgalova
August 4	Arad, Romania; Clay $10,000; Singles and doubles draws	(Romania) Nicoleta-Cătălina Dascălu; 6–3, 6–3	(Romania) Diana Buzean	(Romania) Patricia Maria Țig (North Macedonia) Lina Gjorcheska	(Romania) Raluca Elena Platon (Romania) Ágnes Szatmári (Romania) Irina Maria Bara (Romania) Simona Ionescu
August 4	Arad, Romania; Clay $10,000; Singles and doubles draws	(Romania) Irina Maria Bara (Romania) Diana Buzean; 4–6, 7–5, [10–6]	(North Macedonia) Lina Gjorcheska (Romania) Camelia Hristea	(Romania) Patricia Maria Țig (North Macedonia) Lina Gjorcheska	(Romania) Raluca Elena Platon (Romania) Ágnes Szatmári (Romania) Irina Maria Bara (Romania) Simona Ionescu
August 4	Zaječar, Serbia; Clay $10,000; Singles and doubles draws	(Serbia) Natalija Kostić; 6–2, 6–1	(Ukraine) Elizaveta Ianchuk	(Serbia) Ema Polić (Australia) Alexandra Nancarrow	(Serbia) Dejana Radanović (Bosnia and Herzegovina) Anita Husarić (Serbia) Dunja Stamenković (Romania) Cristina Adamescu
August 4	Zaječar, Serbia; Clay $10,000; Singles and doubles draws	(Ukraine) Elizaveta Ianchuk (Serbia) Natalija Kostić; 6–3, 7–5	(Australia) Alexandra Nancarrow (Czech Republic) Barbora Štefková	(Serbia) Ema Polić (Australia) Alexandra Nancarrow	(Serbia) Dejana Radanović (Bosnia and Herzegovina) Anita Husarić (Serbia) Dunja Stamenković (Romania) Cristina Adamescu
August 4	Nottingham, United Kingdom; Hard $10,000; Singles and doubles draws	(Japan) Mari Tanaka; 6–3, 6–4	(Japan) Mai Minokoshi	(Republic of Ireland) Amy Bowtell (United Kingdom) Emily Arbuthnott	(United Kingdom) Eden Silva (United Kingdom) Jazzamay Drew (United Kingdom) Manisha Foster (United Kingdom) Katie Boulter
August 4	Nottingham, United Kingdom; Hard $10,000; Singles and doubles draws	(Australia) Alison Bai (Japan) Mari Tanaka; 6–4, 6–3	(United Kingdom) Katie Boulter (United Kingdom) Freya Christie	(Republic of Ireland) Amy Bowtell (United Kingdom) Emily Arbuthnott	(United Kingdom) Eden Silva (United Kingdom) Jazzamay Drew (United Kingdom) Manisha Foster (United Kingdom) Katie Boulter
August 11	Seguros Bolívar Open Bogotá; Bogotá, Colombia; Clay $100,000+H; Singles – Doubles	(Spain) Lara Arruabarrena; 6–1, 6–3	(Sweden) Johanna Larsson	(Colombia) Mariana Duque (Spain) Lourdes Domínguez Lino	(Austria) Patricia Mayr-Achleitner (Bulgaria) Elitsa Kostova (Argentina) María Irigoyen (Slovenia) Tadeja Majerič
August 11	Seguros Bolívar Open Bogotá; Bogotá, Colombia; Clay $100,000+H; Singles – Doubles	(Spain) Lara Arruabarrena (Argentina) Florencia Molinero; 6–2, 6–0	(Austria) Melanie Klaffner (Austria) Patricia Mayr-Achleitner	(Colombia) Mariana Duque (Spain) Lourdes Domínguez Lino	(Austria) Patricia Mayr-Achleitner (Bulgaria) Elitsa Kostova (Argentina) María Irigoyen (Slovenia) Tadeja Majerič
August 11	Westende, Belgium; Hard $25,000; Singles and doubles draws	(Spain) Sara Sorribes Tormo; 6–2, 6–0	(Belgium) Ysaline Bonaventure	(Ukraine) Sofiya Kovalets (Sweden) Rebecca Peterson	(France) Myrtille Georges (Czech Republic) Kateřina Vaňková (Russia) Marina Melnikova (Russia) Evgeniya Rodina
August 11	Westende, Belgium; Hard $25,000; Singles and doubles draws	(Belgium) Ysaline Bonaventure (Belgium) Elise Mertens; 6–2, 6–2	(Russia) Marina Melnikova (Russia) Evgeniya Rodina	(Ukraine) Sofiya Kovalets (Sweden) Rebecca Peterson	(France) Myrtille Georges (Czech Republic) Kateřina Vaňková (Russia) Marina Melnikova (Russia) Evgeniya Rodina
August 11	Aegon GB Pro-Series Foxhills; Woking, United Kingdom; Hard $25,000; Singles and doubles draws	(Russia) Marta Sirotkina; 7–5, 6–3	(Romania) Ana Bogdan	(Ukraine) Yuliya Beygelzimer (Belarus) Aliaksandra Sasnovich	(Luxembourg) Mandy Minella (Poland) Justyna Jegiołka (Netherlands) Quirine Lemoine (Croatia) Ana Vrljić
August 11	Aegon GB Pro-Series Foxhills; Woking, United Kingdom; Hard $25,000; Singles and doubles draws	(Japan) Yumi Miyazaki (Japan) Mari Tanaka; 6–2, 7–5	(Italy) Alice Matteucci (Greece) Despina Papamichail	(Ukraine) Yuliya Beygelzimer (Belarus) Aliaksandra Sasnovich	(Luxembourg) Mandy Minella (Poland) Justyna Jegiołka (Netherlands) Quirine Lemoine (Croatia) Ana Vrljić
August 11	Leipzig, Germany; Clay $15,000; Singles and doubles draws	(Slovakia) Rebecca Šramková; 6–4, 3–6, 6–2	(Slovakia) Petra Uberalová	(Romania) Patricia Maria Țig (Croatia) Ema Mikulčić	(Switzerland) Conny Perrin (Argentina) Victoria Bosio (Bulgaria) Viktoriya Tomova (Czech Republic) Jesika Malečková
August 11	Leipzig, Germany; Clay $15,000; Singles and doubles draws	(Russia) Olga Doroshina (Switzerland) Conny Perrin; 7–5, 6–4	(Ukraine) Diana Bogoliy (Russia) Polina Leykina	(Romania) Patricia Maria Țig (Croatia) Ema Mikulčić	(Switzerland) Conny Perrin (Argentina) Victoria Bosio (Bulgaria) Viktoriya Tomova (Czech Republic) Jesika Malečková
August 11	El Trébol, Argentina; Clay $10,000; Singles and doubles draws	(Argentina) Constanza Vega; 6–1, 6–7^{(0–7)}, 6–2	(Argentina) Melina Ferrero	(Brazil) Nathaly Kurata (Argentina) Julieta Lara Estable	(Argentina) Berta Bonardi (Argentina) Carla Lucero (Paraguay) Gabriela Ferreira Sanabria (Chile) Ivania Martinich
August 11	El Trébol, Argentina; Clay $10,000; Singles and doubles draws	(Argentina) Julieta Lara Estable (Argentina) Melina Ferrero; 7–5, 6–4	(Argentina) Ana Victoria Gobbi Monllau (Argentina) Constanza Vega	(Brazil) Nathaly Kurata (Argentina) Julieta Lara Estable	(Argentina) Berta Bonardi (Argentina) Carla Lucero (Paraguay) Gabriela Ferreira Sanabria (Chile) Ivania Martinich
August 11	Innsbruck, Austria; Clay $10,000; Singles and doubles draws	(Croatia) Iva Mekovec; 2–6, 6–2, 6–1	(Italy) Martina Trevisan	(Spain) Laura Pous Tió (Bulgaria) Isabella Shinikova	(Czech Republic) Diana Šumová (France) Carla Touly (Austria) Janina Toljan (Italy) Camilla Rosatello
August 11	Innsbruck, Austria; Clay $10,000; Singles and doubles draws	(Poland) Zuzanna Maciejewska (Italy) Camilla Rosatello; 6–2, 6–2	(Bulgaria) Isabella Shinikova (Bulgaria) Julia Stamatova	(Spain) Laura Pous Tió (Bulgaria) Isabella Shinikova	(Czech Republic) Diana Šumová (France) Carla Touly (Austria) Janina Toljan (Italy) Camilla Rosatello
August 11	Brčko, Bosnia and Herzegovina; Clay $10,000; Singles and doubles draws	(Czech Republic) Gabriela Pantůčková; 6–7^{(5–7)}, 7–6^{(8–6)}, 6–3	(Czech Republic) Barbora Štefková	(Croatia) Nina Alibalić (Slovakia) Karin Morgošová	(Slovenia) Ana Oparenović (Serbia) Katarina Adamović (Russia) Anastasia Rudakova (North Macedonia) Lina Gjorcheska
August 11	Brčko, Bosnia and Herzegovina; Clay $10,000; Singles and doubles draws	(Bosnia and Herzegovina) Ema Burgić (Bosnia and Herzegovina) Anita Husarić; 6–1, 6–4	(Germany) Ina Kaufinger (Czech Republic) Natálie Novotná	(Croatia) Nina Alibalić (Slovakia) Karin Morgošová	(Slovenia) Ana Oparenović (Serbia) Katarina Adamović (Russia) Anastasia Rudakova (North Macedonia) Lina Gjorcheska
August 11	Sharm el-Sheikh, Egypt; Hard $10,000; Singles and doubles draws	(Ukraine) Valeriya Strakhova; 6–3, 6–3	(United Kingdom) Harriet Dart	(Australia) Abbie Myers (Switzerland) Sara Ottomano	(Romania) Elena-Teodora Cadar (Australia) Georgiana Ruhrig (Romania) Daiana Negreanu (Serbia) Vojislava Lukić
August 11	Sharm el-Sheikh, Egypt; Hard $10,000; Singles and doubles draws	(United Kingdom) Harriet Dart (Russia) Anna Morgina; 6–2, 6–1	(Australia) Abbie Myers (Australia) Georgiana Ruhrig	(Australia) Abbie Myers (Switzerland) Sara Ottomano	(Romania) Elena-Teodora Cadar (Australia) Georgiana Ruhrig (Romania) Daiana Negreanu (Serbia) Vojislava Lukić
August 11	Telavi, Georgia; Clay $10,000; Singles and doubles draws	(Russia) Anastasia Gasanova; 6–3, 6–3	(Moldova) Daniela Ciobanu	(Belgium) India Maggen (Germany) Christina Shakovets	(United States) Alexandria Stiteler (Ukraine) Alona Fomina (Armenia) Ani Amiraghyan (Israel) Saray Sterenbach
August 11	Telavi, Georgia; Clay $10,000; Singles and doubles draws	(Ukraine) Alona Fomina (Germany) Christina Shakovets; 6–4, 4–6, [10–7]	(Armenia) Ani Amiraghyan (Russia) Margarita Lazareva	(Belgium) India Maggen (Germany) Christina Shakovets	(United States) Alexandria Stiteler (Ukraine) Alona Fomina (Armenia) Ani Amiraghyan (Israel) Saray Sterenbach
August 11	Istanbul, Turkey; Hard $10,000; Singles and doubles draws	(China) Yang Zhaoxuan; 7–6^{(7–4)}, 6–1	(Turkey) İpek Soylu	(China) Gao Xinyu (Germany) Linda Prenkovic	(Kyrgyzstan) Ksenia Palkina (Austria) Pia König (China) Wang Yan (Turkey) Melis Sezer
August 11	Istanbul, Turkey; Hard $10,000; Singles and doubles draws	(China) Wang Yan (China) You Xiaodi; Walkover	(China) Gao Xinyu (China) Yang Zhaoxuan	(China) Gao Xinyu (Germany) Linda Prenkovic	(Kyrgyzstan) Ksenia Palkina (Austria) Pia König (China) Wang Yan (Turkey) Melis Sezer
August 18	Winnipeg, Canada; Hard $25,000; Singles and doubles draws	(Austria) Patricia Mayr-Achleitner; 6–2, 6–2	(Japan) Mayo Hibi	(United States) Nadja Gilchrist (United Kingdom) Isabelle Wallace	(United States) Alexandra Stevenson (Canada) Charlotte Robillard-Millette (Canada) Carol Zhao (United Kingdom) Katie Boulter
August 18	Winnipeg, Canada; Hard $25,000; Singles and doubles draws	(Canada) Rosie Johanson (Canada) Charlotte Petrick; 6–3, 6–3	(Brazil) Maria Fernanda Alves (United States) Anamika Bhargava	(United States) Nadja Gilchrist (United Kingdom) Isabelle Wallace	(United States) Alexandra Stevenson (Canada) Charlotte Robillard-Millette (Canada) Carol Zhao (United Kingdom) Katie Boulter
August 18	Saint Petersburg, Russia; Clay $25,000+H; Singles and doubles draws	(Turkey) Pemra Özgen; 6–1, 7–5	(Croatia) Ema Mikulčić	(Russia) Vitalia Diatchenko (Ukraine) Valentyna Ivakhnenko	(Russia) Valeria Solovyeva (Russia) Maria Marfutina (Ukraine) Alyona Sotnikova (Belarus) Ilona Kremen
August 18	Saint Petersburg, Russia; Clay $25,000+H; Singles and doubles draws	(Russia) Vitalia Diatchenko (Belarus) Ilona Kremen; 6–1, 6–3	(Russia) Natela Dzalamidze (Russia) Anastasia Pivovarova	(Russia) Vitalia Diatchenko (Ukraine) Valentyna Ivakhnenko	(Russia) Valeria Solovyeva (Russia) Maria Marfutina (Ukraine) Alyona Sotnikova (Belarus) Ilona Kremen
August 18	Wanfercée-Baulet, Belgium; Clay $15,000; Singles and doubles draws	(Sweden) Hilda Melander; 3–6, 6–3, 6–2	(Belgium) Sofie Oyen	(Ukraine) Oleksandra Korashvili (Slovenia) Dalila Jakupović	(Belgium) Klaartje Liebens (Israel) Deniz Khazaniuk (Argentina) Tatiana Búa (Russia) Irina Khromacheva
August 18	Wanfercée-Baulet, Belgium; Clay $15,000; Singles and doubles draws	(Belgium) Elise Mertens (Netherlands) Demi Schuurs; 6–2, 6–3	(Argentina) Tatiana Búa (Chile) Daniela Seguel	(Ukraine) Oleksandra Korashvili (Slovenia) Dalila Jakupović	(Belgium) Klaartje Liebens (Israel) Deniz Khazaniuk (Argentina) Tatiana Búa (Russia) Irina Khromacheva
August 18	Braunschweig, Germany; Clay $15,000; Singles and doubles draws	(Germany) Antonia Lottner; 6–3, 6–3	(Switzerland) Conny Perrin	(Spain) Olga Sáez Larra (Czech Republic) Pernilla Mendesová	(Poland) Magdalena Fręch (Russia) Polina Leykina (Czech Republic) Petra Krejsová (Germany) Charlotte Klasen
August 18	Braunschweig, Germany; Clay $15,000; Singles and doubles draws	(Switzerland) Conny Perrin (South Africa) Chanel Simmonds; 6–3, 6–0	(Russia) Polina Leykina (Bulgaria) Isabella Shinikova	(Spain) Olga Sáez Larra (Czech Republic) Pernilla Mendesová	(Poland) Magdalena Fręch (Russia) Polina Leykina (Czech Republic) Petra Krejsová (Germany) Charlotte Klasen
August 18	Vinkovci, Croatia; Clay $10,000; Singles and doubles draws	(Czech Republic) Gabriela Pantůčková; 6–3, 3–6, 6–4	(Croatia) Iva Mekovec	(Croatia) Adrijana Lekaj (Slovenia) Polona Reberšak	(Austria) Anna Maria Heil (Hungary) Lilla Barzó (Slovakia) Katarína Strešnáková (Serbia) Dejana Radanović
August 18	Vinkovci, Croatia; Clay $10,000; Singles and doubles draws	(Croatia) Jana Fett (Croatia) Adrijana Lekaj; 6–3, 7–5	(Hungary) Lilla Barzó (Hungary) Ágnes Bukta	(Croatia) Adrijana Lekaj (Slovenia) Polona Reberšak	(Austria) Anna Maria Heil (Hungary) Lilla Barzó (Slovakia) Katarína Strešnáková (Serbia) Dejana Radanović
August 18	Sharm el-Sheikh, Egypt; Hard $10,000; Singles and doubles draws	(Australia) Abbie Myers; 3–6, 6–3, 6–0	(China) Li Yixuan	(Egypt) Ola Abou Zekry (New Zealand) Claudia Williams	(Romania) Elena-Teodora Cadar (Portugal) Maria João Koehler (Spain) María Martínez Martínez (France) Pauline Payet
August 18	Sharm el-Sheikh, Egypt; Hard $10,000; Singles and doubles draws	(Australia) Abbie Myers (New Zealand) Claudia Williams; 6–0, 4–6, [10–5]	(Belgium) Britt Geukens (Italy) Jasmin Ladurner	(Egypt) Ola Abou Zekry (New Zealand) Claudia Williams	(Romania) Elena-Teodora Cadar (Portugal) Maria João Koehler (Spain) María Martínez Martínez (France) Pauline Payet
August 18	Duino-Aurisina, Italy; Clay $10,000; Singles and doubles draws	(Italy) Bianca Turati; 1–6, 6–1, 7–6^{(9–7)}	(Croatia) Iva Primorac	(Austria) Barbara Haas (Hungary) Vanda Lukács	(France) Angela Leweurs (Italy) Alice Savoretti (Serbia) Dunja Stamenković (Poland) Anna Korzeniak
August 18	Duino-Aurisina, Italy; Clay $10,000; Singles and doubles draws	(Italy) Deborah Chiesa (Dominican Republic) Francesca Segarelli; 7–6^{(7–3)}, 6–2	(Australia) Alexandra Nancarrow (Hungary) Naomi Totka	(Austria) Barbara Haas (Hungary) Vanda Lukács	(France) Angela Leweurs (Italy) Alice Savoretti (Serbia) Dunja Stamenković (Poland) Anna Korzeniak
August 18	Rosarito Beach, Mexico; Hard $10,000; Singles and doubles draws	(Mexico) Victoria Rodríguez; 6–3, 6–1	(Mexico) Marcela Zacarías	(Russia) Nika Kukharchuk (Paraguay) Ana Paula Neffa de los Ríos	(United States) Alexandra Cercone (Japan) Ayaka Okuno (Guatemala) Kirsten-Andrea Weedon (Trinidad and Tobago) Yolande Leacock
August 18	Rosarito Beach, Mexico; Hard $10,000; Singles and doubles draws	(Mexico) Victoria Rodríguez (Mexico) Marcela Zacarías; 6–4, 6–1	(United States) Alexandra Cercone (United States) Alexa Guarachi	(Russia) Nika Kukharchuk (Paraguay) Ana Paula Neffa de los Ríos	(United States) Alexandra Cercone (Japan) Ayaka Okuno (Guatemala) Kirsten-Andrea Weedon (Trinidad and Tobago) Yolande Leacock
August 18	Oldenzaal, Netherlands; Clay $10,000; Singles and doubles draws	(Belgium) Steffi Distelmans; 5–7, 6–3, 7–6^{(7–5)}	(Norway) Melanie Stokke	(Czech Republic) Diana Šumová (Netherlands) Mandy Wagemaker	(Netherlands) Janneke Wikkerink (Germany) Yana Morderger (Russia) Alina Silich (Germany) Tayisiya Morderger
August 18	Oldenzaal, Netherlands; Clay $10,000; Singles and doubles draws	(Australia) Alison Bai (China) Lu Jiajing; 3–6, 6–4, [10–6]	(Belgium) Elyne Boeykens (Netherlands) Jainy Scheepens	(Czech Republic) Diana Šumová (Netherlands) Mandy Wagemaker	(Netherlands) Janneke Wikkerink (Germany) Yana Morderger (Russia) Alina Silich (Germany) Tayisiya Morderger
August 18	Bucharest, Romania; Clay $10,000; Singles and doubles draws	(Romania) Cristina Stancu; 6–4, 3–6, 6–2	(Romania) Gabriela Talabă	(Romania) Irina Maria Bara (Italy) Giorgia Pinto	(Romania) Simona Ionescu (Romania) Oana Georgeta Simion (Romania) Raluca Elena Platon (Romania) Gabriela Duca
August 18	Bucharest, Romania; Clay $10,000; Singles and doubles draws	(Romania) Raluca Elena Platon (Romania) Cristina Stancu; 6–1, 6–1	(Romania) Camelia Hristea (Romania) Oana Georgeta Simion	(Romania) Irina Maria Bara (Italy) Giorgia Pinto	(Romania) Simona Ionescu (Romania) Oana Georgeta Simion (Romania) Raluca Elena Platon (Romania) Gabriela Duca
August 18	Antalya, Turkey; Hard $10,000; Singles and doubles draws	(France) Clothilde de Bernardi; 6–4, 2–6, 6–3	(Turkey) İpek Soylu	(China) Yang Zhaoxuan (Austria) Janina Toljan	(Ukraine) Alona Fomina (Russia) Antonina Lysakova (Ukraine) Olga Fridman (Turkey) Ayla Aksu
August 18	Antalya, Turkey; Hard $10,000; Singles and doubles draws	(Australia) Nicole Collie (United States) Tina Tehrani; 6–1, 6–4	(Italy) Deborah Cruciani (Italy) Francesca Palmigiano	(China) Yang Zhaoxuan (Austria) Janina Toljan	(Ukraine) Alona Fomina (Russia) Antonina Lysakova (Ukraine) Olga Fridman (Turkey) Ayla Aksu
August 25	Fleurus, Belgium; Clay $25,000; Singles and doubles draws	(Slovakia) Kristína Kučová; 6–3, 6–4	(Russia) Evgeniya Rodina	(Russia) Marina Melnikova (Spain) Lucía Cervera Vázquez	(Belgium) Klaartje Liebens (France) Stéphanie Foretz (China) Lu Jiajing (Belgium) Elise Mertens
August 25	Fleurus, Belgium; Clay $25,000; Singles and doubles draws	(Netherlands) Arantxa Rus (Netherlands) Demi Schuurs; 6–4, 6–1	(Sweden) Hilda Melander (Russia) Marina Melnikova	(Russia) Marina Melnikova (Spain) Lucía Cervera Vázquez	(Belgium) Klaartje Liebens (France) Stéphanie Foretz (China) Lu Jiajing (Belgium) Elise Mertens
August 25	Tsukuba, Japan; Hard $25,000; Singles and doubles draws	(Japan) Junri Namigata; 6–0, 7–6^{(7–3)}	(Chinese Taipei) Chang Kai-chen	(Thailand) Varatchaya Wongteanchai (Japan) Nao Hibino	(Thailand) Tamarine Tanasugarn (Chinese Taipei) Hsu Chieh-yu (China) Han Xinyun (Japan) Rika Fujiwara
August 25	Tsukuba, Japan; Hard $25,000; Singles and doubles draws	(China) Han Xinyun (China) Zhang Kailin; 6–4, 6–4	(Thailand) Nicha Lertpitaksinchai (Thailand) Peangtarn Plipuech	(Thailand) Varatchaya Wongteanchai (Japan) Nao Hibino	(Thailand) Tamarine Tanasugarn (Chinese Taipei) Hsu Chieh-yu (China) Han Xinyun (Japan) Rika Fujiwara
August 25	Mamaia, Romania; Clay $25,000; Singles and doubles draws	(Romania) Andreea Mitu; 6–2, 6–4	(Czech Republic) Tereza Martincová	(Italy) Alberta Brianti (Romania) Gabriela Talabă	(Bulgaria) Viktoriya Tomova (Romania) Irina Maria Bara (Romania) Simona Ionescu (Romania) Daiana Negreanu
August 25	Mamaia, Romania; Clay $25,000; Singles and doubles draws	(Romania) Irina Maria Bara (Romania) Andreea Mitu; 6–4, 6–1	(Romania) Georgia Andreea Crăciun (Romania) Patricia Maria Țig	(Italy) Alberta Brianti (Romania) Gabriela Talabă	(Bulgaria) Viktoriya Tomova (Romania) Irina Maria Bara (Romania) Simona Ionescu (Romania) Daiana Negreanu
August 25	Bagnatica, Italy; Clay $15,000; Singles and doubles draws	(Switzerland) Conny Perrin; 6–3, 7–5	(Italy) Anastasia Grymalska	(Slovakia) Zuzana Zlochová (Italy) Maria Elena Camerin	(Italy) Martina Trevisan (Hungary) Vanda Lukács (Georgia (country)) Ekaterine Gorgodze (Croatia) Iva Mekovec
August 25	Bagnatica, Italy; Clay $15,000; Singles and doubles draws	(Italy) Anastasia Grymalska (Switzerland) Conny Perrin; 7–5, 3–6, [10–8]	(France) Manon Arcangioli (Slovakia) Zuzana Zlochová	(Slovakia) Zuzana Zlochová (Italy) Maria Elena Camerin	(Italy) Martina Trevisan (Hungary) Vanda Lukács (Georgia (country)) Ekaterine Gorgodze (Croatia) Iva Mekovec
August 25	Pörtschach, Austria; Clay $10,000; Singles and doubles draws	(Austria) Pia König; 6–3, 4–6, 7–5	(Austria) Barbara Haas	(Croatia) Adrijana Lekaj (Austria) Lena Reichel	(Croatia) Silvia Njirić (Slovakia) Karin Morgošová (Norway) Melanie Stokke (Slovakia) Chantal Škamlová
August 25	Pörtschach, Austria; Clay $10,000; Singles and doubles draws	(Croatia) Adrijana Lekaj (Croatia) Silvia Njirić; 6–1, 6–7^{(5–7)}, [10–4]	(Slovakia) Zuzana Luknárová (Slovakia) Karin Morgošová	(Croatia) Adrijana Lekaj (Austria) Lena Reichel	(Croatia) Silvia Njirić (Slovakia) Karin Morgošová (Norway) Melanie Stokke (Slovakia) Chantal Škamlová
August 25	Ostrava, Czech Republic; Clay $10,000; Singles and doubles draws	(Croatia) Jana Fett; 6–4, 6–3	(Czech Republic) Lenka Kunčíková	(Czech Republic) Nina Holanová (Czech Republic) Kateřina Kamínková	(Czech Republic) Dominika Paterová (Czech Republic) Hana Pektorová (Czech Republic) Jesika Malečková (Czech Republic) Veronika Kolářová
August 25	Ostrava, Czech Republic; Clay $10,000; Singles and doubles draws	(Czech Republic) Lenka Kunčíková (Czech Republic) Karolína Stuchlá; 4–6, 6–2, [10–7]	(Ukraine) Maryna Kolb (Ukraine) Nadiya Kolb	(Czech Republic) Nina Holanová (Czech Republic) Kateřina Kamínková	(Czech Republic) Dominika Paterová (Czech Republic) Hana Pektorová (Czech Republic) Jesika Malečková (Czech Republic) Veronika Kolářová
August 25	Quito, Ecuador; Clay $10,000; Singles and doubles draws	(Chile) Andrea Koch Benvenuto; 6–3, 6–4	(Argentina) Sofía Blanco	(United Kingdom) Anna Brogan (Bolivia) Noelia Zeballos	(Argentina) Carla Lucero (Colombia) María Paulina Pérez (Chile) Fernanda Brito (Brazil) Nathaly Kurata
August 25	Quito, Ecuador; Clay $10,000; Singles and doubles draws	(Colombia) María Paulina Pérez (Colombia) Paula Andrea Pérez; 7–5, 7–6^{(7–5)}	(Brazil) Nathaly Kurata (Brazil) Eduarda Piai	(United Kingdom) Anna Brogan (Bolivia) Noelia Zeballos	(Argentina) Carla Lucero (Colombia) María Paulina Pérez (Chile) Fernanda Brito (Brazil) Nathaly Kurata
August 25	Sharm el-Sheikh, Egypt; Hard $10,000; Singles and doubles draws	(Egypt) Ola Abou Zekry; 7–6^{(7–3)}, 6–4	(Switzerland) Sara Ottomano	(Russia) Anna Morgina (Italy) Giulia Bruzzone	(Sweden) Anette Munozova (China) Gai Ao (India) Rishika Sunkara (Portugal) Maria João Koehler
August 25	Sharm el-Sheikh, Egypt; Hard $10,000; Singles and doubles draws	(Russia) Anna Morgina (South Africa) Michelle Sammons; 6–2, 6–1	(Italy) Giulia Bruzzone (India) Rishika Sunkara	(Russia) Anna Morgina (Italy) Giulia Bruzzone	(Sweden) Anette Munozova (China) Gai Ao (India) Rishika Sunkara (Portugal) Maria João Koehler
August 25	San Luis Potosí, Mexico; Hard $10,000; Singles and doubles draws	(Mexico) Marcela Zacarías; 6–3, 3–6, 6–1	(United States) Lauren Embree	(Mexico) Victoria Rodríguez (United States) Alexandra Cercone	(United States) Jessica Failla (United States) Danielle Mills (Mexico) Carolina Betancourt (Japan) Ayaka Okuno
August 25	San Luis Potosí, Mexico; Hard $10,000; Singles and doubles draws	(Mexico) Victoria Rodríguez (Mexico) Marcela Zacarías; 6–1, 5–7, [10–8]	(United States) Erin Clark (Japan) Ayaka Okuno	(Mexico) Victoria Rodríguez (United States) Alexandra Cercone	(United States) Jessica Failla (United States) Danielle Mills (Mexico) Carolina Betancourt (Japan) Ayaka Okuno
August 25	Rotterdam, Netherlands; Clay $10,000; Singles and doubles draws	(Netherlands) Quirine Lemoine; 6–3, 3–6, 6–2	(Spain) Olga Sáez Larra	(Greece) Valentini Grammatikopoulou (Czech Republic) Diana Šumová	(Russia) Alina Silich (Germany) Nicola Geuer (Netherlands) Janneke Wikkerink (Netherlands) Inger van Dijkman
August 25	Rotterdam, Netherlands; Clay $10,000; Singles and doubles draws	(Australia) Alison Bai (Sweden) Cornelia Lister; 7–5, 6–4	(France) Brandy Mina (Netherlands) Jainy Scheepens	(Greece) Valentini Grammatikopoulou (Czech Republic) Diana Šumová	(Russia) Alina Silich (Germany) Nicola Geuer (Netherlands) Janneke Wikkerink (Netherlands) Inger van Dijkman
August 25	Tatarstan Open; Kazan, Russia; Hard $10,000; Singles and doubles draws	(Russia) Natela Dzalamidze; 6–2, 6–2	(Russia) Marta Paigina	(Russia) Viktoria Kamenskaya (Russia) Valeriya Urzhumova	(Russia) Sofia Smagina (Belarus) Polina Pekhova (Russia) Ekaterina Pushkareva (Russia) Shakhlo Saidova
August 25	Tatarstan Open; Kazan, Russia; Hard $10,000; Singles and doubles draws	(Russia) Natela Dzalamidze (Russia) Alena Tarasova; 6–1, 6–1	(Russia) Kseniia Bekker (Russia) Anastasia Frolova	(Russia) Viktoria Kamenskaya (Russia) Valeriya Urzhumova	(Russia) Sofia Smagina (Belarus) Polina Pekhova (Russia) Ekaterina Pushkareva (Russia) Shakhlo Saidova
August 25	Yeongwol, South Korea; Hard $10,000; Singles and doubles draws	(South Korea) Choi Ji-hee; 6–3, 6–4	(China) Zhang Yuxuan	(South Korea) Lee Jin-a (China) Liu Chang	(South Korea) Kim Da-hye (China) Liang Chen (South Korea) Lee So-ra (South Korea) Kim Na-ri
August 25	Yeongwol, South Korea; Hard $10,000; Singles and doubles draws	(South Korea) Kim Na-ri (South Korea) Lee Hye-min; 4–6, 6–4, [11–9]	(South Korea) Hong Seung-yeon (South Korea) Kang Seo-kyung	(South Korea) Lee Jin-a (China) Liu Chang	(South Korea) Kim Da-hye (China) Liang Chen (South Korea) Lee So-ra (South Korea) Kim Na-ri
August 25	Caslano, Switzerland; Clay $10,000; Singles and doubles draws	(Switzerland) Lisa Sabino; 4–6, 6–0, 7–5	(Italy) Georgia Brescia	(Australia) Alexandra Nancarrow (Switzerland) Margaux Deagostini	(Italy) Tatiana Pieri (Switzerland) Karin Kennel (Italy) Stefania Rubini (Netherlands) Eva Wacanno
August 25	Caslano, Switzerland; Clay $10,000; Singles and doubles draws	(Australia) Alexandra Nancarrow (Netherlands) Eva Wacanno; 6–0, 6–3	(Italy) Angelica Moratelli (Switzerland) Lisa Sabino	(Australia) Alexandra Nancarrow (Switzerland) Margaux Deagostini	(Italy) Tatiana Pieri (Switzerland) Karin Kennel (Italy) Stefania Rubini (Netherlands) Eva Wacanno
August 25	Antalya, Turkey; Hard $10,000; Singles and doubles draws	(Italy) Valeria Prosperi; 6–2, 6–1	(Ukraine) Anna Shkudun	(China) Yang Zhaoxuan (Japan) Yumi Nakano	(Finland) Emma Laine (Serbia) Vanja Klarić (China) Wang Yan (Australia) Nicole Collie
August 25	Antalya, Turkey; Hard $10,000; Singles and doubles draws	(Ukraine) Alona Fomina (Germany) Christina Shakovets; 6–3, 6–1	(China) Wang Yan (China) Yang Zhaoxuan	(China) Yang Zhaoxuan (Japan) Yumi Nakano	(Finland) Emma Laine (Serbia) Vanja Klarić (China) Wang Yan (Australia) Nicole Collie

=== September ===
Week of	Tournament	Winner	Runners-up	Semifinalists	Quarterfinalists
September 1	Noto, Japan; Carpet $25,000; Singles and doubles draws	(Thailand) Tamarine Tanasugarn; 6–0, 6–4	(Chinese Taipei) Lee Ya-hsuan	(Serbia) Doroteja Erić (South Korea) Han Na-lae	(Australia) Monique Adamczak (Thailand) Varatchaya Wongteanchai (Japan) Miki Miyamura (Japan) Mari Tanaka
September 1	Noto, Japan; Carpet $25,000; Singles and doubles draws	(Japan) Miyabi Inoue (Japan) Riko Sawayanagi; 6–3, 7–6^{(7–2)}	(Japan) Miki Miyamura (Japan) Chihiro Nunome	(Serbia) Doroteja Erić (South Korea) Han Na-lae	(Australia) Monique Adamczak (Thailand) Varatchaya Wongteanchai (Japan) Miki Miyamura (Japan) Mari Tanaka
September 1	TEAN International; Alphen aan den Rijn, Netherlands; Clay $25,000; Singles and doubles draws	(Czech Republic) Denisa Allertová; 6–3, ret.	(Brazil) Teliana Pereira	(Netherlands) Richèl Hogenkamp (Germany) Dinah Pfizenmaier	(Spain) Sara Sorribes Tormo (Russia) Irina Khromacheva (France) Myrtille Georges (Georgia (country)) Ekaterine Gorgodze
September 1	TEAN International; Alphen aan den Rijn, Netherlands; Clay $25,000; Singles and doubles draws	(Sweden) Rebecca Peterson (Netherlands) Eva Wacanno; 6–4, 6–4	(Netherlands) Richèl Hogenkamp (Netherlands) Lesley Kerkhove	(Netherlands) Richèl Hogenkamp (Germany) Dinah Pfizenmaier	(Spain) Sara Sorribes Tormo (Russia) Irina Khromacheva (France) Myrtille Georges (Georgia (country)) Ekaterine Gorgodze
September 1	Moscow, Russia; Clay $25,000; Singles and doubles draws	(Russia) Evgeniya Rodina; 7–6^{(7–2)}, 6–1	(Switzerland) Xenia Knoll	(Kyrgyzstan) Ksenia Palkina (Russia) Marina Melnikova	(Ukraine) Anastasiya Vasylyeva (Russia) Polina Vinogradova (Russia) Viktoria Kamenskaya (Russia) Vitalia Diatchenko
September 1	Moscow, Russia; Clay $25,000; Singles and doubles draws	(Kazakhstan) Anna Danilina (Switzerland) Xenia Knoll; 6–1, 4–6, [10–6]	(Russia) Valentyna Ivakhnenko (Russia) Yuliya Kalabina	(Kyrgyzstan) Ksenia Palkina (Russia) Marina Melnikova	(Ukraine) Anastasiya Vasylyeva (Russia) Polina Vinogradova (Russia) Viktoria Kamenskaya (Russia) Vitalia Diatchenko
September 1	Aegon GB Pro-Series Barnstaple; Barnstaple, United Kingdom; Hard (indoor) $25,000; Singles and doubles draws	(Germany) Carina Witthöft; 6–2, 6–4	(Switzerland) Viktorija Golubic	(France) Alizé Lim (Ukraine) Yuliya Beygelzimer	(Belgium) Klaartje Liebens (Lithuania) Lina Stančiūtė (Croatia) Ana Vrljić (Latvia) Diāna Marcinkēviča
September 1	Aegon GB Pro-Series Barnstaple; Barnstaple, United Kingdom; Hard (indoor) $25,000; Singles and doubles draws	(France) Alizé Lim (Germany) Carina Witthöft; 6–2, 6–1	(Switzerland) Viktorija Golubic (Latvia) Diāna Marcinkēviča	(France) Alizé Lim (Ukraine) Yuliya Beygelzimer	(Belgium) Klaartje Liebens (Lithuania) Lina Stančiūtė (Croatia) Ana Vrljić (Latvia) Diāna Marcinkēviča
September 1	Sankt Pölten, Austria; Clay $10,000; Singles and doubles draws	(Austria) Barbara Haas; 7–6^{(7–1)}, 0–6, 6–1	(Italy) Anna Remondina	(Netherlands) Jade Schoelink (Austria) Julia Grabher	(Austria) Nicole Rottmann (Austria) Pia König (Slovakia) Jana Jablonovská (Croatia) Adrijana Lekaj
September 1	Sankt Pölten, Austria; Clay $10,000; Singles and doubles draws	(Slovakia) Karin Morgošová (Slovakia) Chantal Škamlová; 6–3, 6–1	(Russia) Vera Aleshcheva (Netherlands) Jade Schoelink	(Netherlands) Jade Schoelink (Austria) Julia Grabher	(Austria) Nicole Rottmann (Austria) Pia König (Slovakia) Jana Jablonovská (Croatia) Adrijana Lekaj
September 1	Bol, Croatia; Clay $10,000; Singles and doubles draws	(France) Constance Sibille; 6–4, 6–4	(Croatia) Iva Mekovec	(Czech Republic) Gabriela Pantůčková (Sweden) Ellen Allgurin	(Norway) Emma Flood (Croatia) Jana Fett (Croatia) Tena Lukas (Germany) Anna Klasen
September 1	Bol, Croatia; Clay $10,000; Singles and doubles draws	(Belgium) Justine De Sutter (Belgium) Sofie Oyen; 3–6, 7–6^{(7–4)}, [10–7]	(Germany) Anna Klasen (Germany) Charlotte Klasen	(Czech Republic) Gabriela Pantůčková (Sweden) Ellen Allgurin	(Norway) Emma Flood (Croatia) Jana Fett (Croatia) Tena Lukas (Germany) Anna Klasen
September 1	Prague, Czech Republic; Clay $10,000; Singles and doubles draws	(Czech Republic) Jesika Malečková; 6–3, 7–6^{(8–6)}	(Czech Republic) Zuzana Zálabská	(Czech Republic) Veronika Kolářová (Czech Republic) Eva Rutarová	(Czech Republic) Karolína Stuchlá (Germany) Natalie Pröse (France) Victoria Muntean (Czech Republic) Petra Krejsová
September 1	Prague, Czech Republic; Clay $10,000; Singles and doubles draws	(Czech Republic) Petra Krejsová (Slovakia) Zuzana Luknárová; 4–6, 6–3, [10–6]	(Czech Republic) Lenka Kunčíková (Czech Republic) Karolína Stuchlá	(Czech Republic) Veronika Kolářová (Czech Republic) Eva Rutarová	(Czech Republic) Karolína Stuchlá (Germany) Natalie Pröse (France) Victoria Muntean (Czech Republic) Petra Krejsová
September 1	Quito, Ecuador; Clay $10,000; Singles and doubles draws	(Chile) Fernanda Brito; 7–5, 0–6, 6–0	(Brazil) Eduarda Piai	(Argentina) Sofía Blanco (Argentina) Carla Lucero	(Chile) Andrea Koch Benvenuto (United Kingdom) Anna Brogan (Brazil) Nathaly Kurata (Ukraine) Anastasia Kharchenko
September 1	Quito, Ecuador; Clay $10,000; Singles and doubles draws	(Ukraine) Anastasia Kharchenko (Argentina) Guadalupe Pérez Rojas; 3–6, 6–4, [10–8]	(Argentina) Sofía Blanco (Argentina) Ana Madcur	(Argentina) Sofía Blanco (Argentina) Carla Lucero	(Chile) Andrea Koch Benvenuto (United Kingdom) Anna Brogan (Brazil) Nathaly Kurata (Ukraine) Anastasia Kharchenko
September 1	Sharm el-Sheikh, Egypt; Hard $10,000; Singles and doubles draws	(Russia) Anna Morgina; 6–7^{(2–7)}, 6–4, 6–3	(Serbia) Vojislava Lukić	(Belgium) Britt Geukens (South Africa) Michelle Sammons	(India) Nidhi Chilumula (Italy) Giulia Bruzzone (India) Rishika Sunkara (Spain) María Martínez Martínez
September 1	Sharm el-Sheikh, Egypt; Hard $10,000; Singles and doubles draws	(South Africa) Ilze Hattingh (South Africa) Michelle Sammons; 6–3, 7–5	(China) Gai Ao (India) Rishika Sunkara	(Belgium) Britt Geukens (South Africa) Michelle Sammons	(India) Nidhi Chilumula (Italy) Giulia Bruzzone (India) Rishika Sunkara (Spain) María Martínez Martínez
September 1	Galați, Romania; Clay $10,000; Singles and doubles draws	(Romania) Patricia Maria Țig; 6–3, 6–3	(Ukraine) Elizaveta Ianchuk	(Romania) Ágnes Szatmári (Romania) Diana Buzean	(Romania) Georgia Andreea Crăciun (Romania) Andreea Ghițescu (Romania) Cristina Ene (Romania) Oana Georgeta Simion
September 1	Galați, Romania; Clay $10,000; Singles and doubles draws	(Romania) Oana Georgeta Simion (Romania) Ágnes Szatmári; 4–6, 6–4, [10–8]	(Romania) Diana Buzean (Spain) Arabela Fernández Rabener	(Romania) Ágnes Szatmári (Romania) Diana Buzean	(Romania) Georgia Andreea Crăciun (Romania) Andreea Ghițescu (Romania) Cristina Ene (Romania) Oana Georgeta Simion
September 1	Belgrade, Serbia; Clay $10,000; Singles and doubles draws	(Bosnia and Herzegovina) Dea Herdželaš; 6–2, 6–2	(Croatia) Nina Alibalić	(Serbia) Dejana Radanović (Serbia) Nevena Selaković	(Germany) Stefanie Vorih (Serbia) Ema Polić (Serbia) Marina Lazić (Czech Republic) Tereza Malíková
September 1	Belgrade, Serbia; Clay $10,000; Singles and doubles draws	(Serbia) Natalija Kostić (Bulgaria) Isabella Shinikova; 6–1, 6–2	(Croatia) Nina Alibalić (Serbia) Nina Stojanović	(Serbia) Dejana Radanović (Serbia) Nevena Selaković	(Germany) Stefanie Vorih (Serbia) Ema Polić (Serbia) Marina Lazić (Czech Republic) Tereza Malíková
September 1	Yeongwol, South Korea; Hard $10,000; Singles and doubles draws	(South Korea) Lee Jin-a; 6–2, 6–2	(Australia) Olivia Tjandramulia	(South Korea) Kim Na-ri (China) Liu Chang	(South Korea) Choi Ji-hee (South Korea) Kim Yun-hee (South Korea) Yu Min-hwa (China) Zhang Yuxuan
September 1	Yeongwol, South Korea; Hard $10,000; Singles and doubles draws	(South Korea) Choi Ji-hee (South Korea) Lee So-ra; 6–2, 7–5	(China) Liang Chen (China) Liu Chang	(South Korea) Kim Na-ri (China) Liu Chang	(South Korea) Choi Ji-hee (South Korea) Kim Yun-hee (South Korea) Yu Min-hwa (China) Zhang Yuxuan
September 1	Antalya, Turkey; Hard $10,000; Singles and doubles draws	(Finland) Emma Laine; 6–0, 6–4	(Thailand) Nungnadda Wannasuk	(Japan) Kotomi Takahata (Ukraine) Anna Shkudun	(United Kingdom) Eden Silva (Italy) Valeria Prosperi (China) Wang Yan (Japan) Yumi Nakano
September 1	Antalya, Turkey; Hard $10,000; Singles and doubles draws	(Japan) Akiko Omae (Japan) Kotomi Takahata; 7–5, 6–2	(Japan) Yumi Nakano (United Kingdom) Eden Silva	(Japan) Kotomi Takahata (Ukraine) Anna Shkudun	(United Kingdom) Eden Silva (Italy) Valeria Prosperi (China) Wang Yan (Japan) Yumi Nakano
September 8	L'Open Emeraude Solaire de Saint-Malo; Saint-Malo, France; Clay $50,000; Singles – Doubles	(Germany) Carina Witthöft; 6–0, 6–1	(Italy) Alberta Brianti	(Brazil) Teliana Pereira (Spain) Sara Sorribes Tormo	(Liechtenstein) Stephanie Vogt (Romania) Alexandra Cadanțu (Netherlands) Lesley Kerkhove (Spain) Lourdes Domínguez Lino
September 8	L'Open Emeraude Solaire de Saint-Malo; Saint-Malo, France; Clay $50,000; Singles – Doubles	(Italy) Giulia Gatto-Monticone (Italy) Anastasia Grymalska; 6–3, 6–1	(Argentina) Tatiana Búa (Spain) Beatriz García Vidagany	(Brazil) Teliana Pereira (Spain) Sara Sorribes Tormo	(Liechtenstein) Stephanie Vogt (Romania) Alexandra Cadanțu (Netherlands) Lesley Kerkhove (Spain) Lourdes Domínguez Lino
September 8	Allianz Cup; Sofia, Bulgaria; Clay $25,000; Singles and doubles draws	(Romania) Andreea Mitu; 6–4, 4–6, 6–3	(Russia) Victoria Kan	(Bulgaria) Viktoriya Tomova (Brazil) Beatriz Haddad Maia	(Serbia) Marina Kachar (Ukraine) Sofiya Kovalets (Bulgaria) Dia Evtimova (North Macedonia) Lina Gjorcheska
September 8	Allianz Cup; Sofia, Bulgaria; Clay $25,000; Singles and doubles draws	(North Macedonia) Lina Gjorcheska (Greece) Despina Papamichail; 6–1, 6–4	(Slovakia) Rebecca Šramková (Bulgaria) Julia Terziyska	(Bulgaria) Viktoriya Tomova (Brazil) Beatriz Haddad Maia	(Serbia) Marina Kachar (Ukraine) Sofiya Kovalets (Bulgaria) Dia Evtimova (North Macedonia) Lina Gjorcheska
September 8	Batumi, Georgia; Hard $25,000; Singles and doubles draws	(Belgium) An-Sophie Mestach; 6–2, 6–0	(Ukraine) Olga Ianchuk	(Russia) Natela Dzalamidze (Turkey) Pemra Özgen	(Russia) Valeria Savinykh (Poland) Sandra Zaniewska (Bulgaria) Aleksandrina Naydenova (Netherlands) Cindy Burger
September 8	Batumi, Georgia; Hard $25,000; Singles and doubles draws	(Belgium) An-Sophie Mestach (Poland) Sandra Zaniewska; 6–1, 6–1	(Bulgaria) Aleksandrina Naydenova (Ukraine) Valeriya Strakhova	(Russia) Natela Dzalamidze (Turkey) Pemra Özgen	(Russia) Valeria Savinykh (Poland) Sandra Zaniewska (Bulgaria) Aleksandrina Naydenova (Netherlands) Cindy Burger
September 8	Moscow, Russia; Clay $25,000; Singles and doubles draws	(Russia) Vitalia Diatchenko; 6–3, 6–1	(Russia) Evgeniya Rodina	(Russia) Marina Melnikova (Russia) Valentyna Ivakhnenko	(Switzerland) Xenia Knoll (Colombia) Yuliana Lizarazo (Russia) Polina Monova (Liechtenstein) Kathinka von Deichmann
September 8	Moscow, Russia; Clay $25,000; Singles and doubles draws	(Switzerland) Xenia Knoll (Russia) Veronika Kudermetova; 7–6^{(12–10)}, 7–5	(Russia) Alexandra Artamonova (Russia) Polina Monova	(Russia) Marina Melnikova (Russia) Valentyna Ivakhnenko	(Switzerland) Xenia Knoll (Colombia) Yuliana Lizarazo (Russia) Polina Monova (Liechtenstein) Kathinka von Deichmann
September 8	Redding, United States; Hard $25,000; Singles and doubles draws	(United States) Jennifer Brady; 6–2, 6–1	(United States) Lauren Embree	(Slovakia) Zuzana Zlochová (United States) Alexandra Stevenson	(Japan) Mayo Hibi (United States) Kristie Ahn (United States) Michaela Gordon (Belgium) Klaartje Liebens
September 8	Redding, United States; Hard $25,000; Singles and doubles draws	(United States) Jennifer Brady (United States) Lauren Embree; 6–3, 6–2	(United States) Alexandra Facey (United States) Kat Facey	(Slovakia) Zuzana Zlochová (United States) Alexandra Stevenson	(Japan) Mayo Hibi (United States) Kristie Ahn (United States) Michaela Gordon (Belgium) Klaartje Liebens
September 8	Bol, Croatia; Clay $10,000; Singles and doubles draws	(Croatia) Iva Mekovec; 6–4, 6–1	(Croatia) Jana Fett	(France) Constance Sibille (Czech Republic) Gabriela Pantůčková	(Netherlands) Gabriela van de Graaf (Slovakia) Vivien Juhászová (Germany) Julia Wachaczyk (Sweden) Ellen Allgurin
September 8	Bol, Croatia; Clay $10,000; Singles and doubles draws	(Slovakia) Vivien Juhászová (Slovakia) Barbara Kötelesová; 2–6, 6–1, [10–7]	(Netherlands) Gabriela van de Graaf (Germany) Julia Wachaczyk	(France) Constance Sibille (Czech Republic) Gabriela Pantůčková	(Netherlands) Gabriela van de Graaf (Slovakia) Vivien Juhászová (Germany) Julia Wachaczyk (Sweden) Ellen Allgurin
September 8	Prague, Czech Republic; Clay $10,000; Singles and doubles draws	(Czech Republic) Petra Krejsová; 6–2, 6–4	(Slovakia) Nikola Vajdová	(Switzerland) Tess Sugnaux (Austria) Janina Toljan	(Czech Republic) Zuzana Zálabská (Germany) Dejana Raickovic (Netherlands) Anna Katalina Alzate Esmurzaeva (France) Victoria Muntean
September 8	Prague, Czech Republic; Clay $10,000; Singles and doubles draws	(Slovakia) Jana Jablonovská (Czech Republic) Vendula Žovincová; 6–0, 7–6^{(7–0)}	(Czech Republic) Lucie Procházková (Czech Republic) Kristýna Roučková	(Switzerland) Tess Sugnaux (Austria) Janina Toljan	(Czech Republic) Zuzana Zálabská (Germany) Dejana Raickovic (Netherlands) Anna Katalina Alzate Esmurzaeva (France) Victoria Muntean
September 8	Sharm el-Sheikh, Egypt; Hard $10,000; Singles and doubles draws	(Serbia) Vojislava Lukić; 6–3, 6–4	(Russia) Anna Morgina	(China) Gai Ao (Egypt) Ola Abou Zekry	(South Africa) Michelle Sammons (India) Nidhi Chilumula (Italy) Giulia Bruzzone (Switzerland) Sara Ottomano
September 8	Sharm el-Sheikh, Egypt; Hard $10,000; Singles and doubles draws	(Russia) Anna Morgina (Russia) Yana Sizikova; 6–3, 0–6, [10–6]	(South Africa) Ilze Hattingh (South Africa) Michelle Sammons	(China) Gai Ao (Egypt) Ola Abou Zekry	(South Africa) Michelle Sammons (India) Nidhi Chilumula (Italy) Giulia Bruzzone (Switzerland) Sara Ottomano
September 8	Pula, Italy; Clay $10,000; Singles and doubles draws	(Italy) Martina Trevisan; 6–4, 6–3	(Italy) Cristiana Ferrando	(Italy) Francesca Palmigiano (Italy) Georgia Brescia	(Italy) Anna Floris (Switzerland) Margaux Deagostini (Italy) Stefania Rubini (Belgium) Marie Benoît
September 8	Pula, Italy; Clay $10,000; Singles and doubles draws	(Italy) Alice Balducci (Italy) Angelica Moratelli; 6–1, 6–4	(Italy) Cristiana Ferrando (Italy) Stefania Rubini	(Italy) Francesca Palmigiano (Italy) Georgia Brescia	(Italy) Anna Floris (Switzerland) Margaux Deagostini (Italy) Stefania Rubini (Belgium) Marie Benoît
September 8	Kyoto, Japan; Hard (indoor) $10,000; Singles and doubles draws	(Thailand) Nudnida Luangnam; 7–6^{(9–7)}, 3–6, 6–4	(Japan) Kyōka Okamura	(Japan) Michika Ozeki (Japan) Makoto Ninomiya	(Japan) Mizuno Kijima (Japan) Makiho Kozawa (Japan) Kanae Hisami (Japan) Ayaka Okuno
September 8	Kyoto, Japan; Hard (indoor) $10,000; Singles and doubles draws	(Japan) Makoto Ninomiya (Japan) Kyōka Okamura; 6–3, 6–3	(Japan) Ayaka Okuno (Japan) Michika Ozeki	(Japan) Michika Ozeki (Japan) Makoto Ninomiya	(Japan) Mizuno Kijima (Japan) Makiho Kozawa (Japan) Kanae Hisami (Japan) Ayaka Okuno
September 8	Bucharest, Romania; Clay $10,000; Singles and doubles draws	(Romania) Mihaela Buzărnescu; 6–3, 2–6, 6–1	(Romania) Simona Ionescu	(Romania) Oana Georgeta Simion (Romania) Gabriela Talabă	(Romania) Raluca Elena Platon (Moldova) Alexandra Perper (Romania) Lorena Constantin (Romania) Bianca Hîncu
September 8	Bucharest, Romania; Clay $10,000; Singles and doubles draws	(Romania) Raluca Ciufrila (Romania) Andreea Ghițescu; 6–7^{(2–7)}, 6–1, [10–7]	(Romania) Ioana Ducu (Moldova) Julia Helbet	(Romania) Oana Georgeta Simion (Romania) Gabriela Talabă	(Romania) Raluca Elena Platon (Moldova) Alexandra Perper (Romania) Lorena Constantin (Romania) Bianca Hîncu
September 8	Vrnjačka Banja, Serbia; Clay $10,000; Singles and doubles draws	(Greece) Valentini Grammatikopoulou; 1–6, 6–3, 7–6^{(7–5)}	(Bosnia and Herzegovina) Dea Herdželaš	(Bulgaria) Julia Stamatova (Czech Republic) Gabriela Horáčková	(Serbia) Mina Marković (Serbia) Ema Polić (Belarus) Sadafmoh Tolibova (Serbia) Natalija Kostić
September 8	Vrnjačka Banja, Serbia; Clay $10,000; Singles and doubles draws	(Bosnia and Herzegovina) Dea Herdželaš (Serbia) Nina Stojanović; 6–3, 6–0	(Russia) Daria Lodikova (Ukraine) Kateryna Sliusar	(Bulgaria) Julia Stamatova (Czech Republic) Gabriela Horáčková	(Serbia) Mina Marković (Serbia) Ema Polić (Belarus) Sadafmoh Tolibova (Serbia) Natalija Kostić
September 8	Lleida, Spain; Clay $10,000; Singles and doubles draws	(Spain) Lucía Cervera Vázquez; 6–2, 6–3	(Italy) Alice Savoretti	(United Kingdom) Amanda Carreras (Ukraine) Elizaveta Ianchuk	(Spain) Ainhoa Atucha Gómez (Russia) Anastasiya Saitova (Netherlands) Mandy Wagemaker (Spain) Yvonne Cavallé Reimers
September 8	Lleida, Spain; Clay $10,000; Singles and doubles draws	(Ukraine) Elizaveta Ianchuk (Australia) Alexandra Nancarrow; 6–1, 6–1	(Spain) Yvonne Cavallé Reimers (Spain) Lucía Cervera Vázquez	(United Kingdom) Amanda Carreras (Ukraine) Elizaveta Ianchuk	(Spain) Ainhoa Atucha Gómez (Russia) Anastasiya Saitova (Netherlands) Mandy Wagemaker (Spain) Yvonne Cavallé Reimers
September 8	Antalya, Turkey; Hard $10,000; Singles and doubles draws	(Germany) Kim Grajdek; 6–3, 6–4	(Japan) Kanami Tsuji	(Chinese Taipei) Hsu Ching-wen (China) Wang Yan	(Germany) Luisa Marie Huber (Russia) Vasilisa Aponasenko (Ukraine) Anna Shkudun (Sweden) Kajsa Rinaldo Persson
September 8	Antalya, Turkey; Hard $10,000; Singles and doubles draws	(Japan) Akiko Omae (Japan) Kotomi Takahata; 6–4, 6–2	(Thailand) Nungnadda Wannasuk (Thailand) Varunya Wongteanchai	(Chinese Taipei) Hsu Ching-wen (China) Wang Yan	(Germany) Luisa Marie Huber (Russia) Vasilisa Aponasenko (Ukraine) Anna Shkudun (Sweden) Kajsa Rinaldo Persson
September 15	Coleman Vision Tennis Championships; Albuquerque, United States; Hard $75,000; Singles – Doubles	(United States) Anna Tatishvili; 6–2, 6–4	(United States) Irina Falconi	(United Kingdom) Johanna Konta (United States) Louisa Chirico	(United States) Julia Boserup (United States) Caitlin Whoriskey (Slovenia) Petra Rampre (United States) Madison Brengle
September 15	Coleman Vision Tennis Championships; Albuquerque, United States; Hard $75,000; Singles – Doubles	(United States) Jan Abaza (United States) Melanie Oudin; 6–2, 6–3	(United States) Nicole Melichar (United States) Allie Will	(United Kingdom) Johanna Konta (United States) Louisa Chirico	(United States) Julia Boserup (United States) Caitlin Whoriskey (Slovenia) Petra Rampre (United States) Madison Brengle
September 15	Izida Cup; Dobrich, Bulgaria; Clay $25,000; Singles and doubles draws	(Russia) Evgeniya Rodina; 3–6, 7–5, 6–3	(Romania) Andreea Mitu	(Germany) Dinah Pfizenmaier (Netherlands) Arantxa Rus	(Russia) Polina Leykina (Sweden) Rebecca Peterson (Italy) Alberta Brianti (Romania) Patricia Maria Țig
September 15	Izida Cup; Dobrich, Bulgaria; Clay $25,000; Singles and doubles draws	(Romania) Irina Maria Bara (Romania) Andreea Mitu; 7–5, 7–6^{(7–5)}	(Hungary) Réka-Luca Jani (Bulgaria) Isabella Shinikova	(Germany) Dinah Pfizenmaier (Netherlands) Arantxa Rus	(Russia) Polina Leykina (Sweden) Rebecca Peterson (Italy) Alberta Brianti (Romania) Patricia Maria Țig
September 15	Telavi Open; Telavi, Georgia; Clay $25,000; Singles and doubles draws	(Russia) Darya Kasatkina; 6–1, 4–6, [10–7]	(Italy) Jasmine Paolini	(Israel) Deniz Khazaniuk (Russia) Valeria Solovyeva	(Ukraine) Anastasiya Vasylyeva (Belarus) Sviatlana Pirazhenka (Netherlands) Cindy Burger (Ukraine) Veronika Kapshay
September 15	Telavi Open; Telavi, Georgia; Clay $25,000; Singles and doubles draws	Doubles competition not completed due to bad weather.		(Israel) Deniz Khazaniuk (Russia) Valeria Solovyeva	(Ukraine) Anastasiya Vasylyeva (Belarus) Sviatlana Pirazhenka (Netherlands) Cindy Burger (Ukraine) Veronika Kapshay
September 15	Aegon GB Pro-Series Shrewsbury; Shrewsbury, United Kingdom; Hard (indoor) $25,000; Singles and doubles draws	(France) Océane Dodin; 6–4, 6–3	(Germany) Carina Witthöft	(Belgium) An-Sophie Mestach (Ukraine) Yuliya Beygelzimer	(Turkey) Çağla Büyükakçay (Netherlands) Richèl Hogenkamp (Switzerland) Viktorija Golubic (Serbia) Vesna Dolonc
September 15	Aegon GB Pro-Series Shrewsbury; Shrewsbury, United Kingdom; Hard (indoor) $25,000; Singles and doubles draws	(Netherlands) Richèl Hogenkamp (Netherlands) Lesley Kerkhove; 2–6, 7–5, [10–8]	(Germany) Nicola Geuer (Switzerland) Viktorija Golubic	(Belgium) An-Sophie Mestach (Ukraine) Yuliya Beygelzimer	(Turkey) Çağla Büyükakçay (Netherlands) Richèl Hogenkamp (Switzerland) Viktorija Golubic (Serbia) Vesna Dolonc
September 15	Tlemcen, Algeria; Clay $10,000; Singles and doubles draws	(Russia) Margarita Lazareva; 7–6^{(7–3)}, 6–2	(France) Harmony Tan	(France) Joséphine Boualem (Serbia) Tamara Čurović	(France) Amandine Cazeaux (Austria) Anna Maria Heil (Hungary) Naomi Totka (China) Wang Xiyao
September 15	Tlemcen, Algeria; Clay $10,000; Singles and doubles draws	(Serbia) Barbara Bonić (Russia) Margarita Lazareva; 6–2, 6–2	(Serbia) Tamara Čurović (Hungary) Naomi Totka	(France) Joséphine Boualem (Serbia) Tamara Čurović	(France) Amandine Cazeaux (Austria) Anna Maria Heil (Hungary) Naomi Totka (China) Wang Xiyao
September 15	Bol, Croatia; Clay $10,000; Singles and doubles draws	(Czech Republic) Gabriela Pantůčková; 2–6, 6–4, 6–2	(Croatia) Tena Lukas	(Croatia) Jana Fett (Slovakia) Karin Morgošová	(France) Constance Sibille (Croatia) Iva Primorac (Slovakia) Vivien Juhászová (Slovenia) Polona Reberšak
September 15	Bol, Croatia; Clay $10,000; Singles and doubles draws	(Slovakia) Vivien Juhászová (Slovakia) Karin Morgošová; 4–6, 6–2, [10–2]	(Germany) Theresa Kleinsteuber (Germany) Stefanie Vorih	(Croatia) Jana Fett (Slovakia) Karin Morgošová	(France) Constance Sibille (Croatia) Iva Primorac (Slovakia) Vivien Juhászová (Slovenia) Polona Reberšak
September 15	Hluboká nad Vltavou, Czech Republic; Clay $10,000; Singles and doubles draws	(Czech Republic) Lenka Kunčíková; 6–4, 6–3	(Czech Republic) Jesika Malečková	(Czech Republic) Petra Krejsová (Slovakia) Jana Jablonovská	(Slovakia) Nikola Vajdová (Czech Republic) Tereza Procházková (Czech Republic) Gabriela Horáčková (Germany) Lisa Ponomar
September 15	Hluboká nad Vltavou, Czech Republic; Clay $10,000; Singles and doubles draws	(Slovakia) Jana Jablonovská (Czech Republic) Karolína Muchová; 7–6^{(7–2)}, 7–5	(Czech Republic) Veronika Kolářová (Czech Republic) Petra Krejsová	(Czech Republic) Petra Krejsová (Slovakia) Jana Jablonovská	(Slovakia) Nikola Vajdová (Czech Republic) Tereza Procházková (Czech Republic) Gabriela Horáčková (Germany) Lisa Ponomar
September 15	Sharm el-Sheikh, Egypt; Hard $10,000; Singles and doubles draws	(Russia) Anna Morgina; 7–5, 6–2	(India) Sri Peddi Reddy	(Serbia) Vojislava Lukić (Russia) Yana Sizikova	(South Africa) Ilze Hattingh (Italy) Giulia Bruzzone (Serbia) Bojana Marinković (Sweden) Anette Munozova
September 15	Sharm el-Sheikh, Egypt; Hard $10,000; Singles and doubles draws	(India) Arantxa Andrady (South Africa) Ilze Hattingh; 7–6^{(8–6)}, 6–2	(Russia) Anna Morgina (Russia) Yana Sizikova	(Serbia) Vojislava Lukić (Russia) Yana Sizikova	(South Africa) Ilze Hattingh (Italy) Giulia Bruzzone (Serbia) Bojana Marinković (Sweden) Anette Munozova
September 15	Pula, Italy; Clay $10,000; Singles and doubles draws	(Italy) Martina Trevisan; 6–4, 6–3	(Belgium) Marie Benoît	(Italy) Stefania Rubini (Italy) Corinna Dentoni	(Netherlands) Elke Tiel (Italy) Martina Di Giuseppe (Italy) Federica Arcidiacono (Italy) Alice Balducci
September 15	Pula, Italy; Clay $10,000; Singles and doubles draws	(Italy) Alice Balducci (Italy) Georgia Brescia; 3–6, 6–0, [10–5]	(Belgium) Marie Benoît (Belgium) Kimberley Zimmermann	(Italy) Stefania Rubini (Italy) Corinna Dentoni	(Netherlands) Elke Tiel (Italy) Martina Di Giuseppe (Italy) Federica Arcidiacono (Italy) Alice Balducci
September 15	Pétange, Luxembourg; Hard (indoor) $10,000; Singles and doubles draws	(China) Lu Jiajing; 6–1, ret.	(Slovakia) Michaela Hončová	(France) Lou Brouleau (France) Margot Yerolymos	(France) Chloé Paquet (Belgium) Hélène Scholsen (Netherlands) Kelly Versteeg (France) Victoria Muntean
September 15	Pétange, Luxembourg; Hard (indoor) $10,000; Singles and doubles draws	(Belgium) Elyne Boeykens (Netherlands) Kelly Versteeg; 7–6^{(7–2)}, 6–1	(Slovakia) Michaela Hončová (Germany) Nora Niedmers	(France) Lou Brouleau (France) Margot Yerolymos	(France) Chloé Paquet (Belgium) Hélène Scholsen (Netherlands) Kelly Versteeg (France) Victoria Muntean
September 15	Madrid, Spain; Hard $10,000; Singles and doubles draws	(Spain) Lucía Cervera Vázquez; 6–3, 6–3	(Spain) Olga Sáez Larra	(Greece) Maria Sakkari (France) Jessika Ponchet	(Spain) Georgina García Pérez (Italy) Deborah Chiesa (Spain) Arabela Fernández Rabener (Spain) Inés Ferrer Suárez
September 15	Madrid, Spain; Hard $10,000; Singles and doubles draws	(Spain) Inés Ferrer Suárez (Greece) Maria Sakkari; 6–2, 3–6, [11–9]	(Spain) Yvonne Cavallé Reimers (Spain) Lucía Cervera Vázquez	(Greece) Maria Sakkari (France) Jessika Ponchet	(Spain) Georgina García Pérez (Italy) Deborah Chiesa (Spain) Arabela Fernández Rabener (Spain) Inés Ferrer Suárez
September 15	Antalya, Turkey; Hard $10,000; Singles and doubles draws	(France) Clothilde de Bernardi; 6–2, 6–3	(Czech Republic) Kateřina Kramperová	(Czech Republic) Kateřina Vaňková (Austria) Lisa-Maria Moser	(China) Wang Yan (Japan) Kanami Tsuji (Japan) Kotomi Takahata (China) You Xiaodi
September 15	Antalya, Turkey; Hard $10,000; Singles and doubles draws	(Japan) Yumi Nakano (Japan) Kotomi Takahata; 6–1, 7–5	(Lithuania) Agnė Čepelytė (Lithuania) Justina Mikulskytė	(Czech Republic) Kateřina Vaňková (Austria) Lisa-Maria Moser	(China) Wang Yan (Japan) Kanami Tsuji (Japan) Kotomi Takahata (China) You Xiaodi
September 22	Red Rock Pro Open; Las Vegas, United States; Hard $50,000; Singles – Doubles	(United States) Madison Brengle; 6–1, 6–4	(Portugal) Michelle Larcher de Brito	(Ukraine) Kateryna Bondarenko (United States) Anna Tatishvili	(Kazakhstan) Sesil Karatantcheva (Czech Republic) Nicole Vaidišová (United States) Jennifer Brady (Hungary) Tímea Babos
September 22	Red Rock Pro Open; Las Vegas, United States; Hard $50,000; Singles – Doubles	(Paraguay) Verónica Cepede Royg (Argentina) María Irigoyen; 6–3, 5–7, [11–9]	(United States) Asia Muhammad (United States) Maria Sanchez	(Ukraine) Kateryna Bondarenko (United States) Anna Tatishvili	(Kazakhstan) Sesil Karatantcheva (Czech Republic) Nicole Vaidišová (United States) Jennifer Brady (Hungary) Tímea Babos
September 22	Clermont-Ferrand, France; Hard (indoor) $25,000; Singles and doubles draws	(Netherlands) Richèl Hogenkamp; 6–1, 6–3	(France) Julie Coin	(Czech Republic) Lucie Hradecká (Belgium) An-Sophie Mestach	(Belgium) Ysaline Bonaventure (France) Myrtille Georges (France) Claire Feuerstein (Russia) Margarita Gasparyan
September 22	Clermont-Ferrand, France; Hard (indoor) $25,000; Singles and doubles draws	(France) Irina Ramialison (Germany) Nina Zander; 6–1, 6–0	(France) Fanny Caramaro (France) Victoria Muntean	(Czech Republic) Lucie Hradecká (Belgium) An-Sophie Mestach	(Belgium) Ysaline Bonaventure (France) Myrtille Georges (France) Claire Feuerstein (Russia) Margarita Gasparyan
September 22	Ciudad Juárez, Mexico; Clay $25,000; Singles and doubles draws	(Spain) Laura Pous Tió; 6–4, 6–1	(Spain) Lourdes Domínguez Lino	(Dominican Republic) Francesca Segarelli (Colombia) Mariana Duque	(Mexico) Ana Sofía Sánchez (Brazil) Laura Pigossi (Latvia) Diāna Marcinkēviča (Poland) Justyna Jegiołka
September 22	Ciudad Juárez, Mexico; Clay $25,000; Singles and doubles draws	(Colombia) Mariana Duque (Brazil) Laura Pigossi; 6–1, 3–6, [10–4]	(Romania) Ioana Loredana Roșca (Slovakia) Lenka Wienerová	(Dominican Republic) Francesca Segarelli (Colombia) Mariana Duque	(Mexico) Ana Sofía Sánchez (Brazil) Laura Pigossi (Latvia) Diāna Marcinkēviča (Poland) Justyna Jegiołka
September 22	Royal Cup NLB Montenegro; Podgorica, Montenegro; Clay $25,000; Singles and doubles draws	(Romania) Andreea Mitu; 6–1, 6–4	(Russia) Vitalia Diatchenko	(Italy) Giulia Gatto-Monticone (Spain) Sara Sorribes Tormo	(Slovakia) Kristína Kučová (Brazil) Beatriz Haddad Maia (Netherlands) Arantxa Rus (Croatia) Ema Mikulčić
September 22	Royal Cup NLB Montenegro; Podgorica, Montenegro; Clay $25,000; Singles and doubles draws	(Romania) Alexandra Cadanțu (Liechtenstein) Stephanie Vogt; 6–1, 3–6, [10–2]	(Switzerland) Xenia Knoll (Netherlands) Arantxa Rus	(Italy) Giulia Gatto-Monticone (Spain) Sara Sorribes Tormo	(Slovakia) Kristína Kučová (Brazil) Beatriz Haddad Maia (Netherlands) Arantxa Rus (Croatia) Ema Mikulčić
September 22	Algiers, Algeria; Clay $15,000; Singles and doubles draws	(Switzerland) Conny Perrin; 6–1, 6–1	(France) Sherazad Reix	(Serbia) Tamara Čurović (France) Harmony Tan	(Serbia) Natalija Kostić (Austria) Pia König (Hungary) Naomi Totka (Russia) Margarita Lazareva
September 22	Algiers, Algeria; Clay $15,000; Singles and doubles draws	(Austria) Pia König (Switzerland) Conny Perrin; 6–3, 6–1	(Serbia) Natalija Kostić (Russia) Margarita Lazareva	(Serbia) Tamara Čurović (France) Harmony Tan	(Serbia) Natalija Kostić (Austria) Pia König (Hungary) Naomi Totka (Russia) Margarita Lazareva
September 22	Varna, Bulgaria; Clay $10,000; Singles and doubles draws	(North Macedonia) Lina Gjorcheska; 2–6, 6–4, 6–4	(Czech Republic) Pernilla Mendesová	(Moldova) Daniela Ciobanu (Bulgaria) Isabella Shinikova	(Romania) Raluca Elena Platon (Bulgaria) Petia Arshinkova (Romania) Gabriela Talabă (Romania) Diana Buzean
September 22	Varna, Bulgaria; Clay $10,000; Singles and doubles draws	(Bulgaria) Isabella Shinikova (Bulgaria) Julia Terziyska; 7–5, 6–1	(Romania) Diana Buzean (Romania) Raluca Elena Platon	(Moldova) Daniela Ciobanu (Bulgaria) Isabella Shinikova	(Romania) Raluca Elena Platon (Bulgaria) Petia Arshinkova (Romania) Gabriela Talabă (Romania) Diana Buzean
September 22	Bol, Croatia; Clay $10,000; Singles and doubles draws	(Croatia) Tena Lukas; 6–0, 6–1	(Czech Republic) Petra Rohanová	(Slovenia) Pia Čuk (Czech Republic) Gabriela Pantůčková	(Slovakia) Barbara Kötelesová (Belgium) Elke Lemmens (Germany) Stefanie Vorih (Croatia) Martina Bašić
September 22	Bol, Croatia; Clay $10,000; Singles and doubles draws	(Croatia) Martina Bašić (Croatia) Tena Lukas; 6–1, 6–2	(Slovenia) Ana Oparenović (North Macedonia) Magdalena Stoilkovska	(Slovenia) Pia Čuk (Czech Republic) Gabriela Pantůčková	(Slovakia) Barbara Kötelesová (Belgium) Elke Lemmens (Germany) Stefanie Vorih (Croatia) Martina Bašić
September 22	Sharm el-Sheikh, Egypt; Hard $10,000; Singles and doubles draws	(United Kingdom) Naomi Cavaday; 6–4, 6–4	(Montenegro) Ana Veselinović	(Belgium) Caroline Daxhelet (Romania) Ioana Ducu	(Austria) Barbara Haas (Sweden) Anette Munozova (Japan) Natsumi Yokota (Serbia) Bojana Marinković
September 22	Sharm el-Sheikh, Egypt; Hard $10,000; Singles and doubles draws	(Romania) Ioana Ducu (United Kingdom) Eden Silva; 6–2, 6–4	(Japan) Yui Saikai (Japan) Natsumi Yokota	(Belgium) Caroline Daxhelet (Romania) Ioana Ducu	(Austria) Barbara Haas (Sweden) Anette Munozova (Japan) Natsumi Yokota (Serbia) Bojana Marinković
September 22	Pula, Italy; Clay $10,000; Singles and doubles draws	(Italy) Georgia Brescia; 6–3, 6–3	(Australia) Alexandra Nancarrow	(Italy) Bianca Turati (Italy) Verena Hofer	(Italy) Beatrice Lombardo (Italy) Federica Prati (Switzerland) Tess Sugnaux (Italy) Stefania Rubini
September 22	Pula, Italy; Clay $10,000; Singles and doubles draws	(Italy) Verena Hofer (Italy) Martina Pratesi; 6–4, 7–5	(Belgium) Marie Benoît (Belgium) Kimberley Zimmermann	(Italy) Bianca Turati (Italy) Verena Hofer	(Italy) Beatrice Lombardo (Italy) Federica Prati (Switzerland) Tess Sugnaux (Italy) Stefania Rubini
September 22	Madrid, Spain; Hard $10,000; Singles and doubles draws	(Ukraine) Elizaveta Ianchuk; 6–2, 6–3	(France) Chloé Paquet	(Spain) Georgina García Pérez (Spain) Marta Huqi González Encinas	(Germany) Caroline Übelhör (United Kingdom) Lucy Brown (France) Jessika Ponchet (Spain) Rocío de la Torre Sánchez
September 22	Madrid, Spain; Hard $10,000; Singles and doubles draws	(Spain) Aliona Bolsova Zadoinov (Spain) Olga Sáez Larra; 6–1, 6–4	(Spain) Marta Huqi González Encinas (Spain) Estela Pérez Somarriba	(Spain) Georgina García Pérez (Spain) Marta Huqi González Encinas	(Germany) Caroline Übelhör (United Kingdom) Lucy Brown (France) Jessika Ponchet (Spain) Rocío de la Torre Sánchez
September 22	Antalya, Turkey; Hard $10,000; Singles and doubles draws	(Austria) Lisa-Maria Moser; 7–5, 6–4	(Italy) Claudia Giovine	(China) Ye Qiuyu (Romania) Laura-Ioana Andrei	(Czech Republic) Kateřina Vaňková (Romania) Daiana Negreanu (Hungary) Vanda Lukács (Czech Republic) Kateřina Kramperová
September 22	Antalya, Turkey; Hard $10,000; Singles and doubles draws	(China) Wang Yan (China) You Xiaodi; 6–1, 3–6, [10–8]	(United Kingdom) Harriet Dart (United Kingdom) Jessica Simpson	(China) Ye Qiuyu (Romania) Laura-Ioana Andrei	(Czech Republic) Kateřina Vaňková (Romania) Daiana Negreanu (Hungary) Vanda Lukács (Czech Republic) Kateřina Kramperová
September 22	Amelia Island, United States; Clay $10,000; Singles and doubles draws	(United States) Ingrid Neel; 4–4, ret.	(Romania) Edina Gallovits-Hall	(Norway) Emma Flood (Czech Republic) Marie Bouzková	(United States) Ellie Halbauer (France) Laëtitia Sarrazin (Russia) Natalia Vikhlyantseva (United States) Rianna Valdes
September 22	Amelia Island, United States; Clay $10,000; Singles and doubles draws	(Brazil) Maria Fernanda Alves (United States) Keri Wong; 7–6^{(8–6)}, 7–6^{(7–4)}	(United States) Sophie Chang (United States) Andie Daniell	(Norway) Emma Flood (Czech Republic) Marie Bouzková	(United States) Ellie Halbauer (France) Laëtitia Sarrazin (Russia) Natalia Vikhlyantseva (United States) Rianna Valdes
September 29	Monterrey, Mexico; Hard $25,000; Singles and doubles draws	(Ukraine) Kateryna Bondarenko; 6–1, 7–5	(Croatia) Ana Vrljić	(Canada) Heidi El Tabakh (Slovenia) Nastja Kolar	(Belgium) Elise Mertens (Argentina) María Irigoyen (Hungary) Melinda Czink (Russia) Valeria Savinykh
September 29	Monterrey, Mexico; Hard $25,000; Singles and doubles draws	(Slovenia) Nastja Kolar (Slovakia) Chantal Škamlová; 6–3, 2–6, [10–5]	(Argentina) Florencia Molinero (Georgia (country)) Sofia Shapatava	(Canada) Heidi El Tabakh (Slovenia) Nastja Kolar	(Belgium) Elise Mertens (Argentina) María Irigoyen (Hungary) Melinda Czink (Russia) Valeria Savinykh
September 29	Albena, Bulgaria; Clay $10,000; Singles and doubles draws	(Czech Republic) Pernilla Mendesová; 6–4, 0–6, 6–3	(Romania) Elena Bogdan	(Romania) Diana Buzean (Ukraine) Nadiya Kolb	(Czech Republic) Karolína Stuchlá (Czech Republic) Lenka Kunčíková (Bulgaria) Petia Arshinkova (Netherlands) Anna Katalina Alzate Esmurzaeva
September 29	Albena, Bulgaria; Clay $10,000; Singles and doubles draws	(Romania) Diana Buzean (Romania) Raluca Elena Platon; 6–2, 6–2	(Ukraine) Helen Ploskina (Moldova) Anastasia Vdovenco	(Romania) Diana Buzean (Ukraine) Nadiya Kolb	(Czech Republic) Karolína Stuchlá (Czech Republic) Lenka Kunčíková (Bulgaria) Petia Arshinkova (Netherlands) Anna Katalina Alzate Esmurzaeva
September 29	Sharm el-Sheikh, Egypt; Hard $10,000; Singles and doubles draws	(United Kingdom) Harriet Dart; 6–2, 6–1	(Spain) Nuria Párrizas Díaz	(Serbia) Vojislava Lukić (United Kingdom) Naomi Cavaday	(Egypt) Ola Abou Zekry (Romania) Ioana Ducu (Montenegro) Ana Veselinović (Austria) Barbara Haas
September 29	Sharm el-Sheikh, Egypt; Hard $10,000; Singles and doubles draws	(United Kingdom) Harriet Dart (Turkey) Melis Sezer; 7–5, 6–1	(Romania) Ioana Ducu (United Kingdom) Eden Silva	(Serbia) Vojislava Lukić (United Kingdom) Naomi Cavaday	(Egypt) Ola Abou Zekry (Romania) Ioana Ducu (Montenegro) Ana Veselinović (Austria) Barbara Haas
September 29	Pula, Italy; Clay $10,000; Singles and doubles draws	(Romania) Ilka Csöregi; 7–6^{(7–4)}, 7–6^{(7–3)}	(Germany) Anna Klasen	(Switzerland) Lisa Sabino (Italy) Stefania Rubini	(Bosnia and Herzegovina) Jelena Simić (Italy) Martina Spigarelli (Italy) Cristiana Ferrando (Italy) Anna Remondina
September 29	Pula, Italy; Clay $10,000; Singles and doubles draws	(Germany) Anna Klasen (Germany) Charlotte Klasen; 6–3, 4–6, [10–8]	(Belgium) Marie Benoît (Belgium) Kimberley Zimmermann	(Switzerland) Lisa Sabino (Italy) Stefania Rubini	(Bosnia and Herzegovina) Jelena Simić (Italy) Martina Spigarelli (Italy) Cristiana Ferrando (Italy) Anna Remondina
September 29	Shymkent, Kazakhstan; Clay $10,000; Singles and doubles draws	(Russia) Anastasia Rudakova; 6–4, 6–0	(Russia) Margarita Lazareva	(Georgia (country)) Sofia Kvatsabaia (Kyrgyzstan) Ksenia Palkina	(Uzbekistan) Albina Khabibulina (Kazakhstan) Alexandra Grinchishina (Belarus) Polina Pekhova (Kazakhstan) Ekaterina Klyueva
September 29	Shymkent, Kazakhstan; Clay $10,000; Singles and doubles draws	(Uzbekistan) Albina Khabibulina (Belarus) Polina Pekhova; Walkover	(Kazakhstan) Alexandra Grinchishina (Kyrgyzstan) Ksenia Palkina	(Georgia (country)) Sofia Kvatsabaia (Kyrgyzstan) Ksenia Palkina	(Uzbekistan) Albina Khabibulina (Kazakhstan) Alexandra Grinchishina (Belarus) Polina Pekhova (Kazakhstan) Ekaterina Klyueva
September 29	La Vall d'Uixó, Spain; Clay $10,000; Singles and doubles draws	(Venezuela) Andrea Gámiz; 6–1, 3–6, 6–3	(Spain) Lucía Cervera Vázquez	(Spain) Olga Sáez Larra (Norway) Melanie Stokke	(Italy) Alice Savoretti (France) Estelle Guisard (Ukraine) Elizaveta Ianchuk (Spain) Yvonne Cavallé Reimers
September 29	La Vall d'Uixó, Spain; Clay $10,000; Singles and doubles draws	(Venezuela) Andrea Gámiz (Spain) Olga Parres Azcoitia; 6–2, 6–3	(Argentina) Tatiana Búa (Italy) Alice Savoretti	(Spain) Olga Sáez Larra (Norway) Melanie Stokke	(Italy) Alice Savoretti (France) Estelle Guisard (Ukraine) Elizaveta Ianchuk (Spain) Yvonne Cavallé Reimers
September 29	Antalya, Turkey; Hard $10,000; Singles and doubles draws	(France) Sherazad Reix; 6–4, 6–4	(Czech Republic) Kateřina Vaňková	(Romania) Daiana Negreanu (Czech Republic) Kateřina Kramperová	(Russia) Ksenia Gaydarzhi (Japan) Yurina Koshino (Belgium) Déborah Kerfs (China) You Xiaodi
September 29	Antalya, Turkey; Hard $10,000; Singles and doubles draws	(China) Ye Qiuyu (China) You Xiaodi; 7–5, 2–6, [10–8]	(Belgium) Déborah Kerfs (Italy) Camilla Rosatello	(Romania) Daiana Negreanu (Czech Republic) Kateřina Kramperová	(Russia) Ksenia Gaydarzhi (Japan) Yurina Koshino (Belgium) Déborah Kerfs (China) You Xiaodi
September 29	Hilton Head Island, United States; Clay $10,000; Singles and doubles draws	(Czech Republic) Marie Bouzková; 7–5, 6–1	(Russia) Natalia Vikhlyantseva	(United States) Rianna Valdes (France) Laëtitia Sarrazin	(United States) Marie Norris (United States) Anamika Bhargava (Lithuania) Akvilė Paražinskaitė (Australia) Karolina Wlodarczak
September 29	Hilton Head Island, United States; Clay $10,000; Singles and doubles draws	(Brazil) Maria Fernanda Alves (United States) Keri Wong; 6–1, 7–6^{(7–5)}	(United States) Emily Harman (United States) Madeleine Kobelt	(United States) Rianna Valdes (France) Laëtitia Sarrazin	(United States) Marie Norris (United States) Anamika Bhargava (Lithuania) Akvilė Paražinskaitė (Australia) Karolina Wlodarczak
