= 2014 USTA Player Development Classic =

- Date: July 14–20
- Edition: 6th
- Category: ITF Women's Circuit
- Prize money: $50,000
- Surface: Hard
- Location: Carson, California, United States

Champions

Singles
- (United States) Nicole Gibbs

Doubles
- (Netherlands) Michaëlla Krajicek / (Australia) Olivia Rogowska
← 2011 ·	USTA Player Development Classic	· 2015 →

The 2014 USTA Player Development Classic was a professional tennis tournament played on outdoor hard courts. It was the sixth edition of the tournament which was part of the 2014 ITF Women's Circuit, offering a total of $50,000 in prize money. It took place in Carson, California, United States, on July 14–20, 2014.

== Singles main draw entrants ==
=== Seeds ===
Country	Player	Rank^{1}	Seed
AUS	Olivia Rogowska	127	1
USA	Nicole Gibbs	145	2
AUS	Jarmila Gajdošová	150	3
USA	Melanie Oudin	157	4
USA	Madison Brengle	158	5
BEL	An-Sophie Mestach	167	6
SUI	Romina Oprandi	180	7
JPN	Risa Ozaki	187	8

- ^{1} Rankings as of July 7, 2014

=== Other entrants ===
The following players received wildcards into the singles main draw:

- (United States) Kristie Ahn
- (United States) Jamie Loeb
- (United States) Chiara Scholl
- (United States) Chanelle Van Nguyen

The following players received entry from the qualifying draw:

- (United States) Jennifer Elie
- (United States) Danielle Lao
- (Germany) Tatjana Maria
- (United States) Alexandra Stevenson

== Champions ==
=== Singles ===
- (United States) Nicole Gibbs def. (United States) Melanie Oudin 6–4, 6–4

=== Doubles ===
- (Netherlands) Michaëlla Krajicek / (Australia) Olivia Rogowska def. (United States) Samantha Crawford / (United States) Sachia Vickery 7–6^{(7–4)}, 6–1
