= 2014 USTA Player Development Classic – Singles =

Singles
- 2014 USTA Player Development Classic

Final
- Champion: (United States) Nicole Gibbs
- Runner-up: (United States) Melanie Oudin
- Score: 6–4, 6–4

Events
Singles	Doubles
← 2013 ·	USTA Player Development Classic

Camila Giorgi was the defending champion, having won the previous edition in 2011, but she chose not to participate.

Nicole Gibbs won the all-American final, defeating Melanie Oudin 6–4, 6–4.

== Seeds ==
1. (Australia) Olivia Rogowska (second round)
2. (United States) Nicole Gibbs (champion)
3. (Australia) Jarmila Gajdošová (first round)
4. (United States) Melanie Oudin (final)
5. (United States) Madison Brengle (second round; retired)
6. (Belgium) An-Sophie Mestach (quarterfinals)
7. (Switzerland) Romina Oprandi (second round)
8. (Japan) Risa Ozaki (quarterfinals)

== Main draw ==
=== Key ===
- Q = Qualifier
- WC = Wild card
- LL = Lucky loser
- Alt = Alternate
- SE = Special exempt
- PR = Protected ranking
- ITF = ITF entry
- JE = Junior exempt
- w/o = Walkover
- r = Retired
- d = Defaulted
- SR = Special ranking

=== Finals ===
Semifinals
(United States) Sanaz Marand	6	0	1
4	(United States) Melanie Oudin	2	6	6
(United States) Louisa Chirico	6	2	4
2	(United States) Nicole Gibbs	1	6	6

Final
4	(United States) Melanie Oudin	4	4
2	(United States) Nicole Gibbs	6	6

=== Top half ===
First round
1	(Australia) O Rogowska	6	6
(United States) A Will	3	2
(Brazil) L Pigossi	3	3
(United States) S Marand	6	6
(Netherlands) M Krajicek	6	6
(Australia) S Sanders	0	1
(Russia) M Shamayko	2	1
8	(Japan) R Ozaki	6	6
4	(United States) M Oudin	3	6	6
(United States) T Kinard	6	4	1
(United States) A Muhammad	5
WC	(United States) C Van Nguyen	4^{r}
(United States) J Boserup	6	6
Q	(United States) A Stevenson	4	2
(United States) S Crawford	4	6	2
7	(Switzerland) R Oprandi	6	4	6

Second round
1	(Australia) O Rogowska	4	4
(United States) S Marand	6	6
(Netherlands) M Krajicek	1	5
8	(Japan) R Ozaki	6	7
4	(United States) M Oudin	7	6
(United States) A Muhammad	5	3
(United States) J Boserup	6	5	6
7	(Switzerland) R Oprandi	3	7	1

Quarterfinals
(United States) S Marand	6	6
8	(Japan) R Ozaki	4	0
4	(United States) M Oudin	6	6
(United States) J Boserup	3	4

Semifinals
(United States) S Marand	6	0	1
4	(United States) M Oudin	2	6	6

=== Bottom half ===
First round
5	(United States) M Brengle	6	6
WC	(United States) J Loeb	2	3
(Paraguay) M González	6	0	6^{5}
(United States) L Chirico	2	6	7^{7}
(Russia) D Gavrilova	7	6
WC	(United States) C Scholl	5	2
(United States) M Sanchez	3	6	6
3	(Australia) J Gajdošová	6	3	4
6	(Belgium) A-S Mestach	6	4	6
(United States) S Vickery	1	6	4
(Japan) N Hibino	3	4
Q	(Germany) T Maria	6	6
WC	(United States) K Ahn	6	6
Q	(United States) D Lao	2	4
Q	(United States) J Elie	1	1
2	(United States) N Gibbs	6	6

Second round
5	(United States) M Brengle	0^{r}
(United States) L Chirico	5
(Russia) D Gavrilova	4	6	2
(United States) M Sanchez	6	3	6
6	(Belgium) A-S Mestach	6	5	6
Q	(Germany) T Maria	4	7	3
WC	(United States) K Ahn	4	3
2	(United States) N Gibbs	6	6

Quarterfinals
(United States) L Chirico	7^{7}	6
(United States) M Sanchez	6^{3}	4
6	(Belgium) A-S Mestach	6^{2}	4
2	(United States) N Gibbs	7^{7}	6

Semifinals
(United States) L Chirico	6	2	4
2	(United States) N Gibbs	1	6	6
