= 2014 USTA Player Development Classic – Doubles =

Doubles
- 2014 USTA Player Development Classic

Final
- Champions: (Netherlands) Michaëlla Krajicek (Australia) Olivia Rogowska
- Runners-up: (United States) Samantha Crawford (United States) Sachia Vickery
- Score: 7–6^{(7–4)}, 6–1

Events
Singles	Doubles
← 2013 ·	USTA Player Development Classic

Alexandra Mueller and Asia Muhammad were the defending champions, having won the previous edition in 2011, but Mueller chose not to participate. Muhammad teamed up with Sanaz Marand as the second seeds, but they lost in the first round.

The top seeds Michaëlla Krajicek and Olivia Rogowska won the title, defeating Samantha Crawford and Sachia Vickery in the final, 7–6^{(7–4)}, 6–1.

== Seeds ==
1. (Netherlands) Michaëlla Krajicek / (Australia) Olivia Rogowska (champions)
2. (United States) Sanaz Marand / (United States) Asia Muhammad (first round)
3. (United States) Allie Will / (United States) Keri Wong (quarterfinals)
4. (United States) Louisa Chirico / (United States) Melanie Oudin (quarterfinals)

== Draw ==
=== Key ===
- Q = Qualifier
- WC = Wild card
- LL = Lucky loser
- Alt = Alternate
- SE = Special exempt
- PR = Protected ranking
- ITF = ITF entry
- JE = Junior exempt
- w/o = Walkover
- r = Retired
- d = Defaulted
- SR = Special ranking

First round
1	(Netherlands) M Krajicek (Australia) O Rogowska	7	0	[10]
(United States) J Boserup (United States) M Brengle	5	6	[7]
(United States) M Sanchez (United States) ZG Scandalis	6	7
(United States) J Cako (United States) D Lao	2	5
4	(United States) L Chirico (United States) M Oudin	6	6
(United States) N Gibbs (United States) J Loeb	4	4
WC	(United States) K Ahn (United States) J Brady	5	2
(Paraguay) M González (Brazil) L Pigossi	7	6
(United States) A Bhargava (United States) D Muresan	6^{9}	3
(Germany) T Maria (Switzerland) R Oprandi	7^{11}	6
WC	(United States) Me McCray (United States) Mo McCray	1	2
3	(United States) A Will (United States) K Wong	6	6
WC	(United States) B Morgan (United States) P Porter	6	6
(United States) R Ellison (United States) S Ellison	2	1
(United States) S Crawford (United States) S Vickery	2	7^{7}	[10]
2	(United States) S Marand (United States) A Muhammad	6	6^{5}	[6]

Quarterfinals
1	(Netherlands) M Krajicek (Australia) O Rogowska	6	6
(United States) M Sanchez (United States) ZG Scandalis	1	4
4	(United States) L Chirico (United States) M Oudin	6	3	[12]
(Paraguay) M González (Brazil) L Pigossi	3	6	[14]
(Germany) T Maria (Switzerland) R Oprandi	6	6
3	(United States) A Will (United States) K Wong	3	3
WC	(United States) B Morgan (United States) P Porter	4	6^{5}
(United States) S Crawford (United States) S Vickery	6	7^{7}

Semifinals
1	(Netherlands) M Krajicek (Australia) O Rogowska	5	6	[10]
(Paraguay) M González (Brazil) L Pigossi	7	4	[6]
(Germany) T Maria (Switzerland) R Oprandi	3	1
(United States) S Crawford (United States) S Vickery	6	6

Final
1	(Netherlands) M Krajicek (Australia) O Rogowska	7^{7}	6
(United States) S Crawford (United States) S Vickery	6^{4}	1
