= 2017 Tampere Open – Men's doubles =

Men's doubles
- 2017 Tampere Open

Final
- Champions: (Belgium) Sander Gillé (Belgium) Joran Vliegen
- Runners-up: (Mexico) Lucas Gómez (Argentina) Juan Ignacio Londero
- Score: 6–2, 6–7^{(5–7)}, [10–3]

Events
Singles	men	women
Doubles	men	women
← 2016 ·	Tampere Open	· 2018 →

David Pérez Sanz and Max Schnur were the defending champions but chose not to defend their title.

Sander Gillé and Joran Vliegen won the title after defeating Lucas Gómez and Juan Ignacio Londero 6–2, 6–7^{(5–7)}, [10–3] in the final.

== Seeds ==
1. (Belgium) Sander Gillé / (Belgium) Joran Vliegen (champions)
2. (Spain) Íñigo Cervantes / (Netherlands) Mark Vervoort (quarterfinals)
3. (Belgium) Kimmer Coppejans / (France) Tristan Lamasine (quarterfinals)
4. (Brazil) André Ghem / (Poland) Hubert Hurkacz (first round, withdrew)

== Draw ==
=== Key ===
- Q = Qualifier
- WC = Wild card
- LL = Lucky loser
- Alt = Alternate
- SE = Special exempt
- PR = Protected ranking
- ITF = ITF entry
- JE = Junior exempt
- w/o = Walkover
- r = Retired
- d = Defaulted
- SR = Special ranking

First round
(France) C Hemery (France) A Michon	6	6
(Italy) R Bellotti (Austria) S Ofner	2	3
4	(Brazil) A Ghem (Poland) H Hurkacz
WC	(Finland) L Kiiski (Finland) Tero Vilen	w/o
(Sweden) J Mridha (Sweden) F Simonsson	6	6
WC	(Finland) Patrick Kaukovalta (Finland) P Niklas-Salminen	3	2
(Sweden) M Eriksson (Sweden) M Sekulic	2	2
(Bolivia) H Dellien (Argentina) A Velotti	6	6
(Serbia) P Krstin (Kazakhstan) D Popko	6	2	[5]
3	(Belgium) K Coppejans (France) T Lamasine	3	6	[10]
WC	(Estonia) V Ivanov (Finland) H Sillanpää	2	0
(Mexico) L Gómez (Argentina) JI Londero	6	6
(Sweden) Lucas Renard (Russia) Alexander Vasilenko	6	6^{5}	[8]
2	(Spain) Í Cervantes (Netherlands) M Vervoort	4	7^{7}	[10]

Quarterfinals
1	(Belgium) S Gillé (Belgium) J Vliegen	6	6
(France) C Hemery (France) A Michon	2	2
WC	(Finland) L Kiiski (Finland) T Vilen	3	1
(Sweden) J Mridha (Sweden) F Simonsson	6	6
(Bolivia) H Dellien (Argentina) A Velotti	6	7
3	(Belgium) K Coppejans (France) T Lamasine	2	5
(Mexico) L Gómez (Argentina) JI Londero	6^{4}	6	[11]
2	(Spain) Í Cervantes (Netherlands) M Vervoort	7^{7}	1	[9]

Semifinals
1	(Belgium) S Gillé (Belgium) J Vliegen	7^{7}	7^{7}
(Sweden) J Mridha (Sweden) F Simonsson	6^{3}	6^{3}
(Bolivia) H Dellien (Argentina) A Velotti	2	4
(Mexico) L Gómez (Argentina) JI Londero	6	6

Final
1	(Belgium) S Gillé (Belgium) J Vliegen	6	6^{5}	[10]
(Mexico) L Gómez (Argentina) JI Londero	2	7^{7}	[3]
