= 2016 Tampere Open – Men's doubles =

Men's doubles
- 2016 Tampere Open

Final
- Champions: (Spain) David Pérez Sanz (United States) Max Schnur
- Runners-up: (Australia) Steven de Waard (Germany) Andreas Mies
- Score: 6–4, 6–4

Events
Singles	men	women
Doubles	men	women
← 2015 ·	Tampere Open	· 2017 →

André Ghem and Tristan Lamasine were the defending champions but chose not to defend their title.

David Pérez Sanz and Max Schnur won the title after defeating Steven de Waard and Andreas Mies in the final, 6–4, 6–4.

== Seeds ==
1. (Argentina) Facundo Argüello / (Peru) Sergio Galdós (semifinals)
2. (Spain) David Pérez Sanz / (United States) Max Schnur (champions)
3. (Switzerland) Luca Margaroli / (Netherlands) Mark Vervoort (semifinals)
4. (Sweden) Isak Arvidsson / (Brazil) João Souza (first round)

== Draw ==
=== Key ===
- Q = Qualifier
- WC = Wild card
- LL = Lucky loser
- Alt = Alternate
- SE = Special exempt
- PR = Protected ranking
- ITF = ITF entry
- JE = Junior exempt
- w/o = Walkover
- r = Retired
- d = Defaulted
- SR = Special ranking

First round
1	(Argentina) F Argüello (Peru) S Galdós	7^{7}	6
(Sweden) M Eriksson (Sweden) M Sekulic	6^{5}	3
(Portugal) FF Silva (Portugal) P Sousa	7^{7}	6
(Estonia) V Ivanov (Estonia) Markus Kerner	6^{4}	4
4	(Sweden) I Arvidsson (Brazil) J Souza	2	3
(Australia) S de Waard (Germany) A Mies	6	6
WC	(Finland) L Kiiski (Finland) Tero Vilen	2	1
(Poland) H Hurkacz (Finland) P Niklas-Salminen	6	6
(Russia) A Karatsev (Russia) Alexander Vasilenko	5^{r}
(Russia) I Nedelko (Russia) Dmitry Surchenko	6
WC	(Finland) Sami Huurinainen (Finland) Jesper Saarni	6	1	[6]
3	(Switzerland) L Margaroli (Netherlands) M Vervoort	4	6	[10]
WC	(Finland) Ristomatti Lanne (Finland) E Vasa	6	3	[10]
(Russia) Evgeny Karlovski (Russia) E Tyurnev	4	6	[7]
(France) G Sakharov (Finland) H Sillanpää	4	2
2	(Spain) D Pérez Sanz (United States) M Schnur	6	6

Quarterfinals
1	(Argentina) F Argüello (Peru) S Galdós	6	6
(Portugal) FF Silva (Portugal) P Sousa	4	4
(Australia) S de Waard (Germany) A Mies	5	7^{7}	[10]
(Poland) H Hurkacz (Finland) P Niklas-Salminen	7	6^{4}	[7]
(Russia) I Nedelko (Russia) D Surchenko	3	6^{3}
3	(Switzerland) L Margaroli (Netherlands) M Vervoort	6	7^{7}
WC	(Finland) R Lanne (Finland) E Vasa	1	2
2	(Spain) D Pérez Sanz (United States) M Schnur	6	6

Semifinals
1	(Argentina) F Argüello (Peru) S Galdós	4	6	[3]
(Australia) S de Waard (Germany) A Mies	6	3	[10]
3	(Switzerland) L Margaroli (Netherlands) M Vervoort	6	2	[7]
2	(Spain) D Pérez Sanz (United States) M Schnur	4	6	[10]

Final
(Australia) S de Waard (Germany) A Mies	4	4
2	(Spain) D Pérez Sanz (United States) M Schnur	6	6
