= 2015 Tampere Open =

- Date: 20–26 July
- Edition: 34th (men); 9th (women)
- Category: ATP Challenger Tour; ITF Women's Circuit
- Prize money: €42,500 (men) $10,000 (women)
- Surface: Clay
- Location: Tampere, Finland

Champions

Men's singles
- (France) Tristan Lamasine

Women's singles
- (Hungary) Lilla Barzó

Men's doubles
- (Brazil) André Ghem / (France) Tristan Lamasine

Women's doubles
- (Germany) Nora Niedmers / (Belgium) Hélène Scholsen
← 2014 ·	Tampere Open	· 2016 →

The 2015 Tampere Open was a professional tennis tournament played on clay courts. It was the 34th edition of the tournament which was part of the 2015 ATP Challenger Tour and the 2015 ITF Women's Circuit. It took place in Tampere, Finland, on 20–26 July 2015.

== Men's singles main draw entrants ==
=== Seeds ===
Country	Player	Rank^{1}	Seed
FIN	Jarkko Nieminen	91	1
FRA	Lucas Pouille	94	2
AUT	Jürgen Melzer	129	3
BRA	Andre Ghem	131	4
EST	Jürgen Zopp	153	5
BEL	Germain Gigounon	191	6
FRA	Calvin Hemery	211	7
GER	Andreas Beck	218	8

- ^{1} Rankings as of 13 July 2015.

=== Other entrants ===
The following players received wildcards into the singles main draw:

- (Estonia) Vladimir Ivanov
- (Finland) Micke Kontinen
- (Finland) Patrik Niklas-Salminen
- (Finland) Henrik Sillanpää

The following players received entry with a protected ranking:

- (Spain) José Checa-Calvo
- (Spain) Javier Martí

The following players received entry from the qualifying draw:

- (Finland) Harri Heliövaara
- (France) Axel Michon
- (Estonia) Anton Pavlov
- (Russia) Alexander Vasilenko

The following player received entry as a lucky loser:

- (Finland) Ristomatti Lanne

== Women's singles main draw entrants ==
=== Seeds ===
Country	Player	Rank^{1}	Seed
BIH	Dea Herdželaš	421	1
ROU	Cristina Ene	460	2
HUN	Lilla Barzó	530	3
RUS	Alena Tarasova	569	4
SWE	Jacqueline Cabaj Awad	590	5
DEN	Karen Barbat	660	6
GER	Julia Wachaczyk	674	7
BEL	Hélène Scholsen	686	8

- ^{1} Rankings as of 13 July 2015.

=== Other entrants ===
The following players received wildcards into the singles main draw:

- (Finland) Ella Leivo
- (Finland) Milka-Emilia Pasanen
- (Finland) Roosa Timonen
- (Finland) Tanja Tuomi

The following players received entry from the qualifying draw:

- (Russia) Natalia Belova
- (Russia) Polina Golubovskaya
- (Finland) Mariella Minetti
- (Russia) Tatiana Nikolaeva
- (United Kingdom) Helen Parish
- (Finland) Saana Saarteinen
- (United States) Sabrina Santamaria
- (Netherlands) Rosalie van der Hoek

== Champions ==
=== Men's singles ===
- (France) Tristan Lamasine def. (Brazil) André Ghem, 6–3, 6–2

=== Women's singles ===
- (Hungary) Lilla Barzó def. (Denmark) Karen Barbat, 6–2, 6–4

=== Men's doubles ===
- (Brazil) André Ghem / (France) Tristan Lamasine def. (Finland) Harri Heliövaara / (Finland) Patrik Niklas-Salminen, 7–6^{(7–5)}, 7–6^{(7–4)}

=== Women's doubles ===
- (Germany) Nora Niedmers / (Belgium) Hélène Scholsen def. (Romania) Cristina Ene / (Bosnia and Herzegovina) Dea Herdželaš, 6–4, 7–6^{(7–5)}
