= 2014 Tampere Open =

- Date: 21–27 July
- Edition: 33rd (men); 8th (women)
- Category: ATP Challenger Tour; ITF Women's Circuit
- Prize money: €42,500 (men) $10,000 (women)
- Surface: Clay
- Location: Tampere, Finland

Champions

Men's singles
- (Belgium) David Goffin

Women's singles
- (Greece) Maria Sakkari

Men's doubles
- (Philippines) Ruben Gonzales / (United Kingdom) Sean Thornley

Women's doubles
- (Australia) Alexandra Nancarrow / (Greece) Maria Sakkari
← 2013 ·	Tampere Open	· 2015 →

The 2014 Tampere Open was a professional tennis tournament played on clay courts. It was the 33rd edition of the tournament which was part of the 2014 ATP Challenger Tour and the 2014 ITF Women's Circuit. It took place in Tampere, Finland, on 21–27 July 2014.

== Men's singles main draw entrants ==
=== Seeds ===
Country	Player	Rank^{1}	Seed
FIN	Jarkko Nieminen	58	1
BEL	David Goffin	85	2
BIH	Damir Džumhur	105	3
POR	Gastão Elias	150	4
NED	Jesse Huta Galung	163	5
BRA	Rogério Dutra Silva	175	6
NED	Boy Westerhof	235	7
BEL	Niels Desein	237	8

- ^{1} Rankings as of 14 July 2014

=== Other entrants ===
The following players received wildcards into the singles main draw:

- (Finland) Timi Kivijärvi
- (Finland) Micke Kontinen
- (Finland) Herkko Pöllänen
- (Finland) Henrik Sillanpää

The following players received entry from the qualifying draw:

- (Sweden) Isak Arvidsson
- (Finland) Harri Heliövaara
- (France) Laurent Lokoli
- (Sweden) Elias Ymer

The following player entered using a protected ranking:

- (Ecuador) Giovanni Lapentti

== Women's singles main draw entrants ==
=== Seeds ===
Country	Player	Rank^{1}	Seed
GRE	Maria Sakkari	320	1
AUS	Alexandra Nancarrow	481	2
DEN	Karen Barbat	558	3
RUS	Anastasia Pivovarova	717	4
SWE	Beatrice Cedermark	718	5
RUS	Liubov Vasilyeva	721	6
ITA	Deborah Chiesa	789	7
NED	Jade Schoelink	826	8

- ^{1} Rankings as of 14 July 2014

=== Other entrants ===
The following players received wildcards into the singles main draw:

- (Finland) Nanette Nylund
- (Finland) Milka-Emilia Pasanen
- (Finland) Tanja Tuomi

The following players received entry from the qualifying draw:

- (Denmark) Karen Barbat
- (Russia) Anna Iakovleva
- (Russia) Anastasia Kulikova
- (Finland) Mariella Minetti
- (Finland) Kristina Parviainen
- (Norway) Andrea Raaholt
- (Latvia) Luīze Līva Strīķe
- (Russia) Valeriya Urzhumova

== Champions ==
=== Men's singles ===
- (Belgium) David Goffin def. (Finland) Jarkko Nieminen 7–6^{(7–3)}, 6–3

=== Women's singles ===
- (Greece) Maria Sakkari def. (Russia) Anastasia Pivovarova 6–4, 7–5

=== Men's doubles ===
- (Philippines) Ruben Gonzales / (United Kingdom) Sean Thornley def. (Sweden) Elias Ymer / (Russia) Anton Zaitcev 6–7^{(5–7)}, 7–6^{(12–10)}, [10–8]

=== Women's doubles ===
- (Australia) Alexandra Nancarrow / (Greece) Maria Sakkari def. (Finland) Emma Laine / (Russia) Anastasia Pivovarova 6–2, 6–3
