= 2016 Tampere Open =

- Date: 18–24 July
- Edition: 35th (men); 10th (women)
- Category: ATP Challenger Tour; ITF Women's Circuit
- Prize money: €42,500 (men) $10,000 (women)
- Surface: Clay
- Location: Mumbai, Finland

Champions

Men's singles
- (Belgium) Kimmer Coppejans

Women's singles
- (Finland) Piia Suomalainen

Men's doubles
- (Spain) David Pérez Sanz / (United States) Max Schnur

Women's doubles
- (Finland) Emma Laine / (Germany) Julia Wachaczyk
← 2015 ·	Tampere Open	· 2017 →

The 2016 Tampere Open was a professional tennis tournament played on clay courts. It was the 35th edition of the tournament which was part of the 2016 ATP Challenger Tour and the 2016 ITF Women's Circuit. It took place in Tampere, Finland, on 18–24 July 2016.

== Men's singles main draw entrants ==
=== Seeds ===
Country	Player	Rank^{1}	Seed
ARG	Facundo Argüello	174	1
EST	Jürgen Zopp	176	2
BRA	João Souza	182	3
FRA	Mathias Bourgue	184	4
KAZ	Aleksandr Nedovyesov	196	5
BEL	Kimmer Coppejans	214	6
BEL	Joris De Loore	228	7
SRB	Nikola Milojević	231	8

- ^{1} Rankings as of 11 July 2016.

=== Other entrants ===
The following players received wildcards into the singles main draw:

- (Estonia) Vladimir Ivanov
- (Finland) Ristomatti Lanne
- (Finland) Patrik Niklas-Salminen
- (Finland) Eero Vasa

The following player entered the singles main draw as a special exempt:

- (Belgium) Clément Geens

The following players entered as an alternate:

- (Sweden) Markus Eriksson

The following players received entry from the qualifying draw:

- (Finland) Lauri Kiiski
- (Poland) Hubert Hurkacz
- (Sweden) Milos Sekulic
- (Russia) Alexander Vasilenko

== Women's singles main draw entrants ==
=== Seeds ===
Country	Player	Rank^{1}	Seed
RUS	Alena Tarasova	313	1
GER	Julia Wachaczyk	438	2
FIN	Emma Laine	570	3
GER	Katharina Hering	713	4
FIN	Piia Suomalainen	739	5
GER	Nora Niedmers	759	6
RUS	Angelina Zhuravleva	789	7
NOR	Andrea Raaholt	846	8

- ^{1} Rankings as of 11 July 2016.

=== Other entrants ===
The following players received wildcards into the singles main draw:

- (Finland) Monica Malinen
- (Finland) Mariella Minetti
- (Finland) Milka-Emilia Pasanen
- (Finland) Roosa Timonen

The following players received entry from the qualifying draw:

- (Bulgaria) Aleksandra Draganova
- (Sweden) Katerina Filip
- (United States) Grace Leake
- (Sweden) Sandra Ortevall
- (Finland) Saana Saarteinen
- (Norway) Andrea Raaholt
- (Latvia) Adrija Runča
- (Russia) Anastasia Veselova

The following player received entry by a lucky loser spot:

- (Finland) Emilia Salo

== Champions ==
=== Men's singles ===
- (Belgium) Kimmer Coppejans def. (Russia) Aslan Karatsev, 6–4, 3–6, 7–5

=== Women's singles ===
- (Finland) Piia Suomalainen def. (Finland) Emma Laine, 0–6, 6–2, 6–3

=== Men's doubles ===
- (Spain) David Pérez Sanz / (United States) Max Schnur def. (Australia) Steven de Waard / (Germany) Andreas Mies, 6–4, 6–4

=== Women's doubles ===
- (Finland) Emma Laine / (Germany) Julia Wachaczyk def. (Finland) Mia Eklund / (Germany) Katharina Hering, 6–2, 6–3
