= Maria Sakkari career statistics =

Career finals
Discipline	Type	Won	Lost	Total
Singles	Grand Slam	–	–	–
Singles	WTA Finals	–	–	–
Singles	WTA 1000	1	3	4
Singles	WTA 500	0	4	4
Singles	WTA 250	1	2	2
Singles	Olympics	–	–	–
Singles	Total	2	9	11
Doubles	Grand Slam	–	–	–
Doubles	WTA Finals	–	–	–
Doubles	WTA 1000	–	–	–
Doubles	WTA 500	–	–	–
Doubles	WTA 250	–	–	–
Doubles	Olympics	–	–	–
Doubles	Total	–	–	–

This is a list of the main career statistics of professional Greek tennis player Maria Sakkari. Sakkari has won two singles titles on the WTA Tour at the Morocco Open in 2019 and at the Guadalajara Open in 2023. She also has two WTA 1000 finals, both achieved in 2022; the Indian Wells Open and Guadalajara Open. In 2021, she reached her first Grand Slam semifinal at the French Open. In the same year later, she reached semifinals of the US Open as well.

Sakkari finished season of 2021 playing at the year-end WTA Finals, becoming the first Greek female player to accomplish that. After passing group stage, she lost to Anett Kontaveit in the semifinals. In September 2021, right after reaching US Open semifinals, Sakkari made her debut into the top 10, becoming the first Greek female player to achieve that milestone. One year later, in March 2022, she achieved a career-high singles ranking of world No. 3, in March 2022.

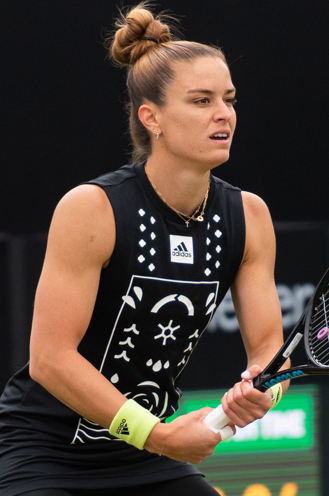
Sakkari at the 2022 Nottingham Open.

== Performance timelines ==
Key
W	F	SF	QF	#R	RR	Q#	P#	DNQ	A	Z#	PO	G	S	B	NMS	NTI	P	NH

(W) winner; (F) finalist; (SF) semifinalist; (QF) quarterfinalist; (#R) rounds 4, 3, 2, 1; (RR) round-robin stage; (Q#) qualification round; (P#) preliminary round; (DNQ) did not qualify; (A) absent; (Z#) Davis/Fed Cup Zonal Group (with number indication) or (PO) play-off; (G) gold, (S) silver or (B) bronze Olympic/Paralympic medal; (NMS) not a Masters tournament; (NTI) not a Tier I tournament; (P) postponed; (NH) not held; (SR) strike rate (events won / competed); (W–L) win–loss record.
To avoid confusion and double counting, these charts are updated at the conclusion of a tournament or when the player's participation has ended.

Only main-draw results in WTA Tour, Grand Slam tournaments, Billie Jean King Cup (Fed Cup), United Cup, Hopman Cup and Olympic Games are included in win–loss records.

=== Singles ===
Current through the 2026 US Open.

Tournament	2012	2013	2014	2015	2016	2017	2018	2019	2020	2021	2022	2023	2024	2025	2026	SR	W–L	Win %
Grand Slam tournaments
Australian Open	A	A	A	A	2R	3R	1R	3R	4R	1R	4R	3R	2R	1R	2R	0 / 11	15–11	58%
French Open	A	A	A	A	Q1	1R	3R	2R	3R	SF	2R	1R	1R	1R	3R	0 / 10	13–10	57%
Wimbledon	A	A	A	A	2R	3R	1R	3R	NH	2R	3R	1R	3R	2R	3R	0 / 10	13–10	57%
US Open	A	A	A	1R	1R	3R	2R	3R	4R	SF	2R	1R	1R	3R	2R	0 / 12	17–12	59%
Win–loss	0–0	0–0	0–0	0–1	2–3	6–4	3–4	7–4	8–3	11–4	7–4	2–4	3–4	3–4	6–4	0 / 43	58–43	57%
National representation
Summer Olympics	A	Not Held			A	Not Held				3R	Not Held		3R	Not Held		0 / 2	4–2	67%
Billie Jean King Cup	Z1	Z2	POZ3	POZ3	Z3	A	POZ2	Z1	A (Note: Edition is split into the two years due to COVID-19.)		A	A	Z1	A		0 / 0	13–12	52%
Year-end championships
WTA Finals	Did Not Qualify								NH	SF	SF	RR	DNQ			0 / 3	5–6	45%
WTA Elite Trophy	Did Not Qualify							RR	Not Held			A	Not Held			0 / 1	0–2	0%
WTA 1000 tournaments
Qatar Open	A	Q1	A	NTI	A	NTI	1R	NTI	3R	NTI	SF	NTI	2R	2R	SF	0 / 6	10–6	63%
Dubai Championships	Not Tier I			A	NTI	A	NTI	A	NTI	1R	NTI	2R	3R	1R	A	0 / 4	1–4	20%
Indian Wells Open	A	A	A	A	Q1	Q2	4R	1R	NH	2R	F	SF	F	3R	3R	0 / 8	20–8	71%
Miami Open	A	A	A	A	1R	Q1	3R	2R	NH	SF	2R	2R	QF	3R	1R	0 / 9	10–9	53%
Madrid Open	A	A	A	A	Q2	Q2	1R	1R	NH	3R	2R	SF	4R	4R	2R	0 / 8	12–8	60%
Italian Open	A	A	A	A	A	Q1	3R	SF	A	2R	QF	3R	4R	2R	2R	0 / 8	14–8	64%
Canadian Open	A	A	A	A	A	A	1R	1R	NH	3R	3R	2R	A	2R	3R	0 / 7	5–7	42%
Cincinnati Open	A	A	A	A	Q1	A	2R	QF	QF	1R	2R	3R	A	2R	3R	0 / 8	10–8	56%
China Open	A	A	A	A	Q2	A	1R	A	Not Held			QF	A	2R		0 / 2	3–3	50%
Wuhan Open	A	A	A	A	A	SF	1R	A	Not Held				A	A		0 / 2	4–2	67%
Guadalajara Open	Not Held										F	W	Not Tier I			1 / 2	9–1	90%
Win–loss	0–0	0–0	0–0	0–0	0–1	4–1	8–9	8–6	5–2	9–7	16–8	17–8	12–6	9–8	8–7	1 / 64	96–63	60%
Career statistics
	2012	2013	2014	2015	2016	2017	2018	2019	2020	2021	2022	2023	2024	2025	2026	SR	W–L	Win %
Tournaments	0 (Note: During the season, she did not play in the main draw of any tour-level tournaments. However, she played at the Billie Jean King Cup, which is not counted as a played tournament but matches counted.)	0	0	1	12	16	24	22	11	19	23	22	16	18	18	Career total: 202		
Titles	0	0	0	0	0	0	0	1	0	0	0	1	0	0	0	Career total: 2		
Finals	0	0	0	0	0	0	1	1	0	1	4	2	1	0	0	Career total: 10		
Hard win–loss	0–3	0–0	2–1	0–1	2–9	9–7	15–17	15–15	18–9	28–15	25–14	29–18	12–8	10–15	13–9	1 / 131	177–141	56%
Clay win–loss	0–0	0–4	0–0	2–1	4–3	3–7	10–4	13–5	2–2	9–4	8–5	5–4	9–5	5–5	1–4	1 / 48	71–53	57%
Grass win–loss	0–0	0–0	0–0	0–0	1–1	4–2	0–3	5–4	0–0	1–1	7–4	4–3	2–3	3–3	2–3	0 / 27	29–28	51%
Overall win–loss	0–3	0–4	2–1	2–2	7–13	16–16	25–24	33–24	20–11	38–20	40–23	38–25	23–16	18–23	16–16	2 / 202	278–221	56%
Win %	0%	0%	67%	50%	35%	50%	51%	58%	65%	66%	63%	60%	59%	44%	50%	Career total: 56%		
Year-end ranking (Note: 2011: WTA ranking–702.)	627	610	301	188	89	52	41	23	22	6	6	9	32	52		$14,357,240		

=== Doubles ===
Current after the 2024 Australian Open.

Tournament	2016	2017	2018	2019	2020	2021	2022	2023	2024	SR	W–L	Win %
Grand Slam tournaments
Australian Open	A	A	A	1R	1R	A	A	A	A	0 / 2	0–2	0%
French Open	A	A	1R	A	A	A	A	A		0 / 1	0–1	0%
Wimbledon	A	A	1R	2R	NH	A	A	A		0 / 2	1–2	33%
US Open	A	A	A	2R	A	A	A	A		0 / 1	1–1	50%
Win–loss	0–0	0–0	0–2	2–3	0–1	0–0	0–0	0–0		0 / 6	2–6	25%
WTA 1000 tournaments
Indian Wells Open	A	A	A	A	NH	A	2R	A		0 / 1	1–1	50%
Miami Open	A	A	A	A	NH	1R	A	A		0 / 1	0–1	0%
Cincinnati Open	A	A	A	2R	A	A	A	A		0 / 1	1–1	50%
Career statistics
Tournaments	1	1	3	6	1	3	2	0		Career total: 17		
Overall win–loss	0–1	0–1	0–3	4–6	0–1	0–3	1–2	2–0	0–2	0 / 17	7–19	27%
Year-end ranking	370	609	909	176	194	1069	497	–				

== WTA 1000 tournaments ==
=== Singles: 4 (1 title, 3 runner-ups) ===
Result	Year	Tournament	Surface	Opponent	Score
Loss	2022	Indian Wells Open	Hard	(Poland) Iga Świątek	4–6, 1–6
Loss	2022	Guadalajara Open	Hard	(United States) Jessica Pegula	2–6, 3–6
Win	2023	Guadalajara Open	Hard	(United States) Caroline Dolehide	7–5, 6–3
Loss	2024	Indian Wells Open	Hard	(Poland) Iga Świątek	4–6, 0–6

== WTA Tour finals ==
Sakkari debuted on the WTA Tour in 2015 at the US Open as a qualifier. Since then, she has won two singles titles and reached an additional nine singles finals.

=== Singles: 11 (2 titles, 9 runner-ups) ===
Legend WTA 1000 (1–3) WTA 500 / Premier (0–4) WTA 250 / International (1–2)	Finals by surface Hard (1–8) Clay (1–1)	Finals by setting Outdoor (2–7) Indoor (0–2)

Result	W–L	Date	Tournament	Tier	Surface	Opponent	Score
Loss	0–1	Aug 2018	Silicon Valley Classic, United States	Premier	Hard	(Romania) Mihaela Buzărnescu	1–6, 0–6
Win	1–1	May 2019	Morocco Open, Morocco	International	Clay	(United Kingdom) Johanna Konta	2–6, 6–4, 6–1
Loss	1–2	Sep 2021	Ostrava Open, Czech Republic	WTA 500	Hard (i)	(Estonia) Anett Kontaveit	2–6, 5–7
Loss	1–3	Feb 2022	St. Petersburg Trophy, Russia	WTA 500	Hard (i)	(Estonia) Anett Kontaveit	7–5, 6–7^{(4–7)}, 5–7
Loss	1–4	Mar 2022	Indian Wells Open, United States	WTA 1000	Hard	(Poland) Iga Świątek	4–6, 1–6
Loss	1–5	Sep 2022	Emilia-Romagna Open, Italy	WTA 250	Clay	(Egypt) Mayar Sherif	5–7, 3–6
Loss	1–6	Oct 2022	Guadalajara Open, Mexico	WTA 1000	Hard	(United States) Jessica Pegula	2–6, 3–6
Loss	1–7	Aug 2023	Washington Open, United States	WTA 500	Hard	(United States) Coco Gauff	2–6, 3–6
Win	2–7	Sep 2023	Guadalajara Open, Mexico	WTA 1000	Hard	(United States) Caroline Dolehide	7–5, 6–3
Loss	2–8	Mar 2024	Indian Wells Open, United States	WTA 1000	Hard	(Poland) Iga Świątek	4–6, 0–6
Loss	2–9	Jul 2026	Athens Open, Greece	WTA 250	Hard	(Czech Republic) Barbora Krejčíková	6–7^{(5–7)}, 3–6

== ITF Circuit finals ==
Sakkari debuted on the ITF Women's World Tennis Tour in 2010 at Mytilene in her homeland Greece. In singles, she has been in 17 finals and won seven of them, while in doubles she has been in nine finals and won five of them. Her biggest title on the ITF Circuit was the $75k Dubai Tennis Challenge in the doubles draw in November 2015.

=== Singles: 17 (7 titles, 10 runner-ups) ===
Legend $50,000 tournaments (0–2) $25,000 tournaments (1–1) $10,000 tournaments (6–7)	Finals by surface Hard (3–4) Clay (4–6)

Result	W–L	Date	Tournament	Tier	Surface	Opponent	Score
Loss	0–1	Sep 2011	ITF Athens, Greece	10,000	Clay	(Israel) Deniz Khazaniuk	6–1, 3–6, 3–6
Loss	0–2	Sep 2012	ITF Antalya, Turkey	10,000	Hard	(Romania) Ana Bogdan	3–6, 2–6
Loss	0–3	Sep 2013	ITF Mytilini, Greece	10,000	Hard	(Belgium) Klaartje Liebens	1–6, 2–6
Loss	0–4	Sep 2013	ITF Athens, Greece	10,000	Hard	(Russia) Aminat Kushkova	0–6, 5–7
Loss	0–5	Apr 2014	ITF Heraklion, Greece	10,000	Hard	(Czech Republic) Pernilla Mendesová	2–6, 2–6
Win	1–5	Apr 2014	ITF Heraklion, Greece	10,000	Hard	(Greece) Despina Papamichail	6–1, 1–6, 6–3
Loss	1–6	May 2014	ITF Båstad, Sweden	10,000	Clay	(Switzerland) Conny Perrin	5–7, 1–6
Win	2–6	May 2014	ITF Båstad, Sweden	10,000	Clay	(Germany) Carolin Daniels	7–5, 6–2
Win	3–6	Jun 2014	ITF Niš, Serbia	10,000	Clay	(Bosnia and Herzegovina) Dea Herdželaš	3–6, 6–4, 6–1
Loss	3–7	Jun 2014	Bella Cup Torun, Poland	25,000	Clay	(Czech Republic) Barbora Krejčíková	4–6, 1–6
Win	4–7	Jul 2014	Tampere Open, Finland	10,000	Clay	(Russia) Anastasia Pivovarova	6–4, 7–5
Loss	4–8	Aug 2014	ITF Savitaipale, Finland	10,000	Clay	(Finland) Emma Laine	3–6, 7–5, 0–6
Win	5–8	Mar 2015	ITF Heraklion, Greece	10,000	Hard	(Russia) Anastasiya Komardina	6–4, 6–3
Win	6–8	Mar 2015	ITF Heraklion, Greece	10,000	Hard	(Greece) Valentini Grammatikopoulou	6–2, 6–2
Win	7–8	May 2015	Maribor Open, Slovenia	25,000	Clay	(Sweden) Rebecca Peterson	3–6, 6–2, 6–2
Loss	7–9	May 2016	Open Saint-Gaudens, France	50,000+H	Clay	(Russia) Irina Khromacheva	6–1, 6–7^{(3)}, 1–6
Loss	7–10	Jun 2016	Szeged Open, Hungary	50,000	Clay	(Bulgaria) Viktoriya Tomova	6–4, 0–6, 4–6

=== Doubles: 9 (5 titles, 4 runner-ups) ===
Legend $75,000 tournaments (1–0) $25,000 tournaments (0–1) $10,000 tournaments (4–3)	Finals by surface Hard (2–2) Clay (3–2)

Result	W–L	Date	Tournament	Tier	Surface	Partner	Opponents	Score
Loss	0–1	Sep 2013	ITF Athens, Greece	10,000	Hard	(Chinese Taipei) Lee Pei-chi	(Israel) Keren Shlomo (Israel) Saray Sterenbach	6–3, 1–6, [8–10]
Loss	0–2	Apr 2014	ITF Heraklion, Greece	10,000	Hard	(Greece) Despina Papamichail	(Russia) Natela Dzalamidze (Greece) Valentini Grammatikopoulou	7–6, 3–6, [5–10]
Win	1–2	May 2014	ITF Båstad, Sweden	10,000	Clay	(Germany) Kim Grajdek	(Bosnia and Herzegovina) Dea Herdželaš (Switzerland) Conny Perrin	7–5, 6–4
Win	2–2	Jun 2014	ITF Niš, Serbia	10,000	Clay	(Australia) Alexandra Nancarrow	(North Macedonia) Lina Gjorcheska (Serbia) Marina Lazić	6–3, 6–0
Win	3–2	Jul 2014	Tampere Open, Finland	10,000	Clay	(Australia) Alexandra Nancarrow	(Finland) Emma Laine (Russia) Anastasia Pivovarova	6–2, 6–3
Loss	3–3	Aug 2014	ITF Savitaipale, Finland	10,000	Clay	(Australia) Alexandra Nancarrow	(Finland) Emma Laine (Ukraine) Diana Bogoliy	4–6, 6–7
Win	4–3	Sep 2014	ITF Madrid, Spain	10,000	Hard	(Spain) Inés Ferrer Suárez	(Spain) Yvonne Cavallé Reimers (Spain) Lucía Cervera Vázquez	6–2, 3–6, [11–9]
Loss	4–4	Aug 2015	ITF Bad Saulgau, Germany	25,000	Clay	(Greece) Despina Papamichail	(Romania) Cristina Dinu (Romania) Diana Buzean	6–2, 3–6, [8–10]
Win	5–4	Nov 2015	Dubai Tennis Challenge, UAE	75,000	Hard	(Turkey) Çağla Büyükakçay	(Belgium) Elise Mertens (Turkey) İpek Soylu	7–6^{(6)}, 6–4

== WTA Tour career earnings ==
Year	Grand Slam titles (Note: Includes singles, doubles and mixed doubles titles.)	WTA titles	Total titles	Earnings ($)	Money list rank
2015	0	0	0	62,248	218
2016	0	0	0	251,192	117
2017	0	0	0	573,742	60
2018	0	0	0	756,233	52
2019	0	1	1	1,060,223	40
2020	0	0	0	784,535	19
2021	0	0	0	2,029,990	10
2022	0	0	0	2,481,419	7
2023	0	1	1	2,600,139	10
2024	0	0	0	1,355,180	6
Career	0	2	2	12,012,621	53

== Career Grand Slam statistics ==
=== Grand Slam tournament seedings ===
The tournaments won by Sakkari are in boldface, and advanced into finals by Sakkari are in italics.

Legend seeded No. 3 (0 / 1) seeded No. 4–10 (0 / 11) seeded No. 11–32 (0 / 11) unseeded (0 / 9) qualifier (0 / 3)	Longest streak 1 8 (ongoing) 11 8 2

Year	Australian Open	French Open	Wimbledon	US Open
2015	did not play			qualifier
2016	qualifier	~~did not qualify~~	qualifier	unseeded
2017	unseeded	unseeded	unseeded	unseeded
2018	unseeded	unseeded	unseeded	32nd
2019	unseeded	29th	31st	30th
2020	22nd	20th	cancelled	15th
2021	20th	17th	15th	17th
2022	5th	4th	5th	3rd
2023	6th	8th	8th	8th
2024	8th	6th	9th	9th
2025	31st	unseeded	unseeded	

=== Best Grand Slam results details ===
Grand Slam winners are in boldface, and runner–ups in italics.

**Australian Open**
**2020 (22nd)**
Round	Opponent	Rank	Score
1R	(Russia) Margarita Gasparyan	100	6–2, 6–2
2R	(Japan) Nao Hibino (Q)	103	7–6^{(7–4)}, 6–4
3R	(United States) Madison Keys (10)	11	6–4, 6–4
4R	(Czech Republic) Petra Kvitová (7)	8	7–6^{(7–4)}, 3–6, 2–6
**2022 (5th)**
1R	(Germany) Tatjana Maria (PR)	287	6–4, 7–6^{(7–2)}
2R	(China) Zheng Qinwen (Q)	108	6–1, 6–4
3R	(Russia) Veronika Kudermetova (28)	32	6–4, 6–1
4R	(United States) Jessica Pegula (21)	21	6–7^{(0–7)}, 3–6

**Wimbledon**
**2017 (Unseeded)**
Round	Opponent	Rank	Score
1R	(Czech Republic) Kateřina Siniaková	39	6–4, 6–4
2R	(Czech Republic) Kristýna Plíšková	44	6–7^{(6–8)}, 6–4, 6–4
3R	(United Kingdom) Johanna Konta (6)	7	4–6, 1–6
**2019 (31st)**
1R	(United States) Bernarda Pera	90	7–6^{(7–4)}, 6–3
2R	(Czech Republic) Marie Bouzková (LL)	115	6–4, 6–1
3R	(Ukraine) Elina Svitolina (8)	8	3–6, 7–6^{(7–1)}, 2–6
**2022 (5th)**
1R	(Australia) Zoe Hives (Q)	571	6–1, 6–4
2R	(Bulgaria) Viktoriya Tomova	112	6–4, 6–3
3R	(Germany) Tatjana Maria	103	3–6, 5–7
**2024 (9th)**
1R	(United States) McCartney Kessler (Q)	119	6–3, 6–1
2R	(Netherlands) Arantxa Rus	56	7–5, 6–3
3R	(United Kingdom) Emma Raducanu (WC)	135	2–6, 3–6
**2026 (unseeded)**
1R	(Denmark) Clara Tauson (24)	25	6–3, 6–3
2R	(Uzbekistan) Kamilla Rakhimova	70	6–3, 0–6, 7–6^{(10–7)}
3R	(Italy) Jasmine Paolini (13)	17	1–6, 2–6

**French Open**
**2021 (17th)**
Round	Opponent	Rank	Score
1R	(Ukraine) Katarina Zavatska	129	6–4, 6–1
2R	(Italy) Jasmine Paolini	91	6–2, 6–3
3R	(Belgium) Elise Mertens (14)	15	7–5, 6–7^{(2–7)}, 6–2
4R	(United States) Sofia Kenin (4)	5	6–1, 6–3
QF	(Poland) Iga Świątek (8)	9	6–4, 6–4
SF	**(Czech Republic) Barbora Krejčíková**	33	5–7, 6–4, 7–9

**US Open**
**2021 (17th)**
Round	Opponent	Rank	Score
1R	(Ukraine) Marta Kostyuk	55	6–4, 6–3
2R	(Czech Republic) Kateřina Siniaková	53	6–4, 6–2
3R	(Czech Republic) Petra Kvitová (10)	11	6–4, 6–3
4R	(Canada) Bianca Andreescu (6)	7	6–7^{(2–7)}, 7–6^{(8–6)}, 6–3
QF	(Czech Republic) Karolína Plíšková (4)	4	6–4, 6–4
SF	**(United Kingdom) Emma Raducanu (Q)**	150	1–6, 4–6

== Wins against top 10 players ==
- She has a 31–43 record against players who were, at the time the match was played, ranked in the top 10.

#	Player	Rk	Event	Surface	Rd	Score	Rk	Ref
2017
1.	(Denmark) Caroline Wozniacki	6	Wuhan Open, China	Hard	2R	7–5, 6–3	80	
2018
2.	(Czech Republic) Karolína Plíšková	5	Italian Open, Italy	Clay	2R	3–6, 6–3, 7–5	42	
2019
3.	(Netherlands) Kiki Bertens	6	Charleston Open, United States	Clay	3R	7–6^{(10–8)}, 6–3	50	
4.	(Czech Republic) Petra Kvitová	5	Italian Open, Italy	Clay	3R	7–5, 5–7, 4–0 ret.	39	
5.	(Ukraine) Elina Svitolina	7	Silicon Valley Classic, US	Hard	QF	1–6, 7–6^{(7–3)}, 6–3	30	
6.	(Czech Republic) Petra Kvitová	6	Cincinnati Open, US	Hard	2R	6–4, 2–6, 6–3	33	
7.	(Belarus) Aryna Sabalenka	9	Cincinnati Open, US	Hard	3R	6–7^{(4–7)}, 6–4, 6–4	33	
2020
8.	(Switzerland) Belinda Bencic	5	St. Petersburg Trophy, Russia	Hard (i)	QF	2–6, 6–4, 6–3	21	
9.	(United States) Serena Williams	9	Cincinnati Open, US	Hard	3R	5–7, 7–6^{(7–5)}, 6–1	21	
10.	(Ukraine) Elina Svitolina	5	Ostrava Open, Czech Republic	Hard (i)	2R	6–3, 6–3	23	
2021
11.	(United States) Sofia Kenin	4	Abu Dhabi Open, UAE	Hard	QF	2–6, 6–2, 6–0	22	
12.	(Japan) Naomi Osaka	2	Miami Open, United States	Hard	QF	6–0, 6–4	25	
13.	(United States) Sofia Kenin	5	French Open, France	Clay	4R	6–1, 6–3	18	
14.	(Poland) Iga Świątek	9	French Open, France	Clay	QF	6–4, 6–4	18	
15.	(Canada) Bianca Andreescu	7	US Open, United States	Hard	4R	6–7^{(2–7)}, 7–6^{(8–6)}, 6–3	18	
16.	(Czech Republic) Karolína Plíšková	4	US Open, United States	Hard	QF	6–4, 6–4	18	
17.	(Poland) Iga Świątek	6	Ostrava Open, Czech Republic	Hard (i)	SF	6–4, 7–5	12	
18.	(Poland) Iga Świątek	9	WTA Finals, Mexico	Hard	RR	6–2, 6–4	6	
19.	(Belarus) Aryna Sabalenka	2	WTA Finals, Mexico	Hard	RR	7–6^{(7–1)}, 6–7^{(6–8)}, 6–3	6	
2022
20.	(Spain) Paula Badosa	7	Indian Wells Open, US	Hard	SF	6–2, 4–6, 6–1	6	
21.	(United States) Jessica Pegula	3	WTA Finals, United States	Hard (i)	RR	7–6^{(8–6)}, 7–6^{(7–4)}	5	
22.	Aryna Sabalenka	7	WTA Finals, United States	Hard (i)	RR	6–2, 6–4	5	
23.	(Tunisia) Ons Jabeur	2	WTA Finals, United States	Hard (i)	RR	6–2, 6–3	5	
2023
24.	(France) Caroline Garcia	5	Qatar Open, Qatar	Hard	QF	6–2, 6–7^{(5–7)}, 7–6^{(7–5)}	7	
25.	(United States) Jessica Pegula	4	Washington Open, US	Hard	SF	6–3, 4–6, 6–2	9	
26.	(France) Caroline Garcia	10	Pan Pacific Open, Japan	Hard	QF	6–2, 6–2	6	
2024
27.	(United States) Coco Gauff	3	Indian Wells Open, US	Hard	SF	6–4, 6–7^{(5–7)}, 6–2	9	
2025
28.	(Italy) Jasmine Paolini	6	Madrid Open, Spain	Clay	3R	6–2, 6–1	82	
2026
29.	(Italy) Jasmine Paolini	8	Qatar Open, Qatar	Hard	2R	6–4, 6–2	52	
30.	(Poland) Iga Świątek	2	Qatar Open, Qatar	Hard	QF	2-6, 6–4, 7-5	52	
31.	(Ukraine) Marta Kostyuk	10	Wuhan Open, China	Hard	2R	4–6, 6–2, 6–2	35	

== Double bagel matches (6–0, 6–0) ==
Result	Year	W–L	Tournament	Tier	Surface	Opponent	Rk	Rd	Rk
Win	2011	1–0	ITF Rethymno, Greece	10,000	Hard	(Germany) Sally Dischmann (Q)	n/a	1R	n/a
Win	2013	2–0	ITF Netanya, Israel	10,000	Hard	(Israel) Talya Zandberg (WC)	n/a	1R	620
Win	2013	3–0	ITF Borriol, Spain	10,000	Clay	(Spain) Paula Mocete-Talamantes	1196	2R	584
Win	2014	4–0	ITF Tampere, Finland	10,000	Clay	(Finland) Nanette Nylund (WC)	n/a	1R	309
Win	2014	5–0	ITF Savitaipale, Finland	10,000	Clay	(Russia) Daria Ponomareva (Q)	n/a	1R	306
Win	2014	6–0	ITF Savitaipale, Finland	10,000	Clay	(Latvia) Laura Gulbe	1221	2R	306
Win	2014	7–0	ITF St. Petersburg, Russia	25,000+H	Clay	(Russia) Viktoriia Fedorova (WC)	n/a	1R	291
Win	2015	8–0	ITF Campinas, Brazil	25,000	Clay	(Russia) Alina Silich	787	Q1	275
Win	2015	9–0	ITF Campinas, Brazil	25,000	Clay	(Brazil) Carolina Barsante	n/a	Q2	275
Win	2015	10–0	ITF Heraklion, Greece	10,000	Hard	(Russia) Anastasiya Komardina	n/a	1R	264
Win	2015	11–0	Carlsbad Classic, US	WTA 125	Hard	(United States) Brett Berger (WC)	n/a	1R	182
Win	2016	12–0	Wimbledon, UK	Grand Slam	Grass	(Russia) Polina Leykina	202	Q1	115
