= 2016 Tampere Open – Men's singles =

Men's singles
- 2016 Tampere Open

Final
- Champion: (Belgium) Kimmer Coppejans
- Runner-up: (Russia) Aslan Karatsev
- Score: 6–4, 3–6, 7–5

Events
Singles	men	women
Doubles	men	women
← 2015 ·	Tampere Open	· 2017 →

Tristan Lamasine was the defending champion but chose not to defend his title.

Kimmer Coppejans won the title after defeating Aslan Karatsev 6–4, 3–6, 7–5 in the final.

== Seeds ==
1. (Argentina) Facundo Argüello (first round)
2. (Estonia) Jürgen Zopp (first round)
3. (Brazil) João Souza (quarterfinals)
4. (France) Mathias Bourgue (first round)
5. (Kazakhstan) Aleksandr Nedovyesov (second round)
6. (Belgium) Kimmer Coppejans (champion)
7. (Belgium) Joris De Loore (second round)
8. (Serbia) Nikola Milojević (first round, retired)

== Draw ==
=== Key ===
- Q = Qualifier
- WC = Wild card
- LL = Lucky loser
- Alt = Alternate
- SE = Special exempt
- PR = Protected ranking
- ITF = ITF entry
- JE = Junior exempt
- w/o = Walkover
- r = Retired
- d = Defaulted
- SR = Special ranking

=== Finals ===
Semifinals
(Russia) Aslan Karatsev	3	6	6
(Spain) Rubén Ramírez Hidalgo	6	1	4
(Portugal) Pedro Sousa	7	6^{1}	2
6	(Belgium) Kimmer Coppejans	5	7^{7}	6

Final
(Russia) Aslan Karatsev	4	6	5
6	(Belgium) Kimmer Coppejans	6	3	7

=== Top half ===
First round
1	(Argentina) F Argüello	6	2	4
(Russia) A Karatsev	0	6	6
(Portugal) FF Silva	6	6
(Slovakia) N Gombos	4	3
Q	(Finland) L Kiiski	3	3
(Netherlands) S Griekspoor	6	6
Alt	(Sweden) M Eriksson	3	7^{10}	3
8	(Serbia) N Milojević	6	6^{8}	0^{r}
4	(France) M Bourgue	3	6	3
WC	(Finland) P Niklas-Salminen	6	2	6
(France) G Sakharov	6	6
WC	(Finland) Ristomatti Lanne	1	3
(Spain) R Ramírez Hidalgo	7^{10}	7^{7}
(Belgium) Y Reuter	6^{8}	6^{4}
WC	(Estonia) V Ivanov	2	2
7	(Belgium) J De Loore	6	6

Second round
(Russia) A Karatsev	6	6^{9}	6
(Portugal) FF Silva	3	7^{11}	2
(Netherlands) S Griekspoor	6^{4}	3
Alt	(Sweden) M Eriksson	7^{7}	6
WC	(Finland) P Niklas-Salminen	1	2
(France) G Sakharov	6	6
(Spain) R Ramírez Hidalgo	7	7^{8}
7	(Belgium) J De Loore	5	6^{6}

Quarterfinals
(Russia) A Karatsev	6	4	6
Alt	(Sweden) M Eriksson	2	6	0
(France) G Sakharov	1	1
(Spain) R Ramírez Hidalgo	6	6

Semifinals
(Russia) A Karatsev	3	6	6
(Spain) R Ramírez Hidalgo	6	1	4

=== Bottom half ===
First round
5	(Kazakhstan) A Nedovyesov	6	6
Q	(Sweden) M Sekulic	1	2
(Spain) D Pérez Sanz	6^{6}	3
(Portugal) P Sousa	7^{8}	6
Q	(Russia) Alexander Vasilenko	1	7^{7}	1
(Belgium) G Gigounon	6	6^{5}	6
(Slovakia) F Horanský	4	6^{6}
3	(Brazil) J Souza	6	7^{8}
6	(Belgium) K Coppejans	6	6
(Russia) I Nedelko	3	0
(South Africa) L Harris	5	5
(Italy) L Giustino	7	7
WC	(Finland) E Vasa	2	2
SE	(Belgium) Clément Geens	6	6
Q	(Poland) H Hurkacz	3	6	6
2	(Estonia) J Zopp	6	2	4

Second round
5	(Kazakhstan) A Nedovyesov	5	3
(Portugal) P Sousa	7	6
(Belgium) G Gigounon	2	2
3	(Brazil) J Souza	6	6
6	(Belgium) K Coppejans	7	6
(Italy) L Giustino	5	1
SE	(Belgium) C Geens	3	1
Q	(Poland) H Hurkacz	6	6

Quarterfinals
(Portugal) P Sousa	6	7^{8}
3	(Brazil) J Souza	4	6^{6}
6	(Belgium) K Coppejans	6	6
Q	(Poland) H Hurkacz	1	3

Semifinals
(Portugal) P Sousa	7	6^{1}	2
6	(Belgium) K Coppejans	5	7^{7}	6
