= 2015 Tampere Open – Men's doubles =

Men's doubles
- 2015 Tampere Open

Final
- Champions: (Brazil) André Ghem (France) Tristan Lamasine
- Runners-up: (Finland) Harri Heliövaara (Finland) Patrik Niklas-Salminen
- Score: 7–6^{(7–5)}, 7–6^{(7–4)}

Events
Singles	men	women
Doubles	men	women
← 2014 ·	Tampere Open	· 2016 →

Ruben Gonzales (Highest Doubles Ranking: 131) and Sean Thornley (Highest Doubles Ranking: 160) were the defending champions, but they decided not to participate this year.

André Ghem and Tristan Lamasine won the title, defeating Harri Heliövaara and Patrik Niklas-Salminen 7–6^{(7–5)}, 7–6^{(7–4)}.

== Seeds ==
1. (Chile) Julio Peralta / (United States) Matt Seeberger (semifinals)
2. (Serbia) Peđa Krstin / (Czech Republic) Jan Šátral (withdrew)
3. (Brazil) André Ghem / (France) Tristan Lamasine (champions)
4. (Estonia) Vladimir Ivanov / (Russia) Alexander Vasilenko (first round)

== Draw ==
=== Key ===
- Q = Qualifier
- WC = Wild card
- LL = Lucky loser
- Alt = Alternate
- SE = Special exempt
- PR = Protected ranking
- ITF = ITF entry
- JE = Junior exempt
- w/o = Walkover
- r = Retired
- d = Defaulted
- SR = Special ranking

First round
(Romania) P Grigoriu (Switzerland) H Laaksonen	6	6
WC	(Finland) Patrick Kaukovalta (Russia) David Sarkisov	3	1
4	(Estonia) V Ivanov (Russia) Alexander Vasilenko	3	6^{3}
(France) A Michon (Finland) H Sillanpää	6	7^{7}
(Finland) H Heliövaara (Finland) P Niklas-Salminen	6	6
(France) J Eysseric (France) G Mina	2	1
(France) M Hamou (France) C Hemery	6	6
(Bosnia and Herzegovina) T Brkić (Croatia) A Veić	3	4
WC	(Finland) L Kiiski (Finland) Tero Vilen	3	6	[10]
WC	(Finland) Pyry Hyrkkönen (Finland) Ristomatti Lanne	6	4	[3]

Quarterfinals
1	(Chile) J Peralta (United States) M Seeberger	6	6^{7}	[10]
WC	(Romania) P Grigoriu (Switzerland) H Laaksonen	2	7^{9}	[7]
(France) A Michon (Finland) H Sillanpää	4	0^{r}
(Finland) H Heliövaara (Finland) P Niklas-Salminen	6	0
(France) M Hamou (France) C Hemery	w/o
3	(Brazil) A Ghem (France) T Lamasine
(Finland) L Kiiski (Finland) T Vilen
2	(Serbia) P Krstin (Czech Republic) J Šátral	w/o

Semifinals
1	(Chile) J Peralta (United States) M Seeberger	3	6^{4}
(Finland) H Heliövaara (Finland) P Niklas-Salminen	6	7^{7}
3	(Brazil) A Ghem (France) T Lamasine	6	6
(Finland) L Kiiski (Finland) T Vilen	4	3

Final
(Finland) H Heliövaara (Finland) P Niklas-Salminen	6^{5}	6^{4}
3	(Brazil) A Ghem (France) T Lamasine	7^{7}	7^{7}
