= 2017 Tampere Open – Men's singles =

Men's singles
- 2017 Tampere Open

Final
- Champion: (France) Calvin Hemery
- Runner-up: (Portugal) Pedro Sousa
- Score: 6–3, 6–4

Events
Singles	men	women
Doubles	men	women
← 2016 ·	Tampere Open	· 2018 →

Kimmer Coppejans was the defending champion but lost in the first round to Tallon Griekspoor.

Calvin Hemery won the title after defeating Pedro Sousa 6–3, 6–4 in the final.

== Seeds ==
1. (Portugal) Pedro Sousa (final)
2. (Austria) Sebastian Ofner (quarterfinals)
3. (Spain) Guillermo García López (second round)
4. (Spain) Rubén Ramírez Hidalgo (second round)
5. (Belgium) Kimmer Coppejans (first round)
6. (Kazakhstan) Dmitry Popko (quarterfinals)
7. (Belgium) Joris De Loore (withdrew)
8. (France) Calvin Hemery (champion)
9. (France) Tristan Lamasine (first round)

== Draw ==
=== Key ===
- Q = Qualifier
- WC = Wild card
- LL = Lucky loser
- Alt = Alternate
- SE = Special exempt
- PR = Protected ranking
- ITF = ITF entry
- JE = Junior exempt
- w/o = Walkover
- r = Retired
- d = Defaulted
- SR = Special ranking

=== Finals ===
Semifinals
1	(Portugal) Pedro Sousa	6	6
(Spain) Íñigo Cervantes	3	3
8	(France) Calvin Hemery	7^{7}	7^{7}
(Russia) Alexey Vatutin	6^{3}	6^{4}

Final
1	(Portugal) Pedro Sousa	3	4
8	(France) Calvin Hemery	6	6

=== Top half ===
First round
1	(Portugal) P Sousa	6	6
WC	(Estonia) V Ivanov	1	2
Q	(Israel) B Patael	1	3
(Brazil) A Ghem	6	6
Q	(Russia) Alexander Vasilenko	5	1
(Poland) K Majchrzak	7	6
(Spain) D Gimeno Traver	6	5	3
6	(Kazakhstan) D Popko	4	7	6
4	(Spain) R Ramírez Hidalgo	6	6
LL	(Sweden) M Eriksson	2	3
(Spain) Í Cervantes	4	6	6
(Egypt) M Safwat	6	4	0
(Poland) H Hurkacz	5	5
(Sweden) E Ymer	7	7
(Netherlands) T Griekspoor	6	6
5	(Belgium) K Coppejans	3	3

Second round
1	(Portugal) P Sousa	6	3	6
(Brazil) A Ghem	1	6	1
(Poland) K Majchrzak	5	4
6	(Kazakhstan) D Popko	7	6
4	(Spain) R Ramírez Hidalgo	6	3	4
(Spain) Í Cervantes	4	6	6
(Sweden) E Ymer	3	4
(Netherlands) T Griekspoor	6	6

Quarterfinals
1	(Portugal) P Sousa	6	6
6	(Kazakhstan) D Popko	4	1
(Spain) Í Cervantes	7	6
(Netherlands) T Griekspoor	5	3

Semifinals
1	(Portugal) P Sousa	6	6
(Spain) Í Cervantes	3	3

=== Bottom half ===
First round
8	(France) C Hemery	6	6
WC	(Finland) Patrick Kaukovalta	2	2
LL	(Bolivia) H Dellien	7	7^{7}
(Italy) R Bellotti	5	6^{5}
(Argentina) A Velotti	6^{1}	6	2
(Belgium) Y Reuter	7^{7}	1	6
Q	(France) A Michon	2	4
3	(Spain) G García López	6	6
9	(France) T Lamasine	6^{4}	7	4
(Russia) A Vatutin	7^{7}	5	6
WC	(Sweden) F Simonsson	7	6
Q	(Argentina) JI Londero	5	4
WC	(Finland) L Kiiski	4	4
(Turkey) C İlkel	6	6
(Serbia) P Krstin	7^{7}	5	4
2	(Austria) S Ofner	6^{5}	7	6

Second round
8	(France) C Hemery	6	6
LL	(Bolivia) H Dellien	1	2
(Belgium) Y Reuter	4	6	7^{7}
3	(Spain) G García López	6	4	6^{5}
(Russia) A Vatutin	6	6
WC	(Sweden) F Simonsson	3	2
(Turkey) C İlkel	2	3
2	(Austria) S Ofner	6	6

Quarterfinals
8	(France) C Hemery	6	6
(Belgium) Y Reuter	2	2
(Russia) A Vatutin	1	6	6
2	(Austria) S Ofner	6	0	3

Semifinals
8	(France) C Hemery	7^{7}	7^{7}
(Russia) A Vatutin	6^{3}	6^{4}
