= 2017 Tampere Open =

- Date: 24–30 July
- Edition: 36th (men); 11th (women)
- Category: ATP Challenger Tour; ITF Women's Circuit
- Surface: Clay
- Location: Tampere, Finland

Champions

Men's singles
- (France) Calvin Hemery

Women's singles
- (Czech Republic) Monika Kilnarová

Men's doubles
- (Belgium) Sander Gillé / (Belgium) Joran Vliegen

Women's doubles
- (Russia) Anna Iakovleva / (Ukraine) Gyulnara Nazarova
← 2016 ·	Tampere Open	· 2018 →

The 2017 Tampere Open was a professional tennis tournament played on clay courts. It was the 36th edition of the tournament which was part of the 2017 ATP Challenger Tour and the 2017 ITF Women's Circuit. It took place in Tampere, Finland, on 24–30 July 2017.

== Men's singles main draw entrants ==
=== Seeds ===
Country	Player	Rank^{1}	Seed
POR	Pedro Sousa	150	1
AUT	Sebastian Ofner	156	2
ESP	Guillermo García López	163	3
ESP	Rubén Ramírez Hidalgo	187	4
BEL	Kimmer Coppejans	190	5
KAZ	Dmitry Popko	200	6
~~BEL~~	~~Joris De Loore~~	~~204~~	~~7~~
FRA	Calvin Hemery	215	8
FRA	Tristan Lamasine	225	9

- ^{1} Rankings as of 17 July 2017.

=== Other entrants ===
The following players received wildcards into the singles main draw:

- (Estonia) Vladimir Ivanov
- (Finland) Patrick Kaukovalta
- (Finland) Lauri Kiiski
- (Sweden) Fred Simonsson

The following players received entry from the qualifying draw:

- (Argentina) Juan Ignacio Londero
- (France) Axel Michon
- (Israel) Ben Patael
- (Russia) Alexander Vasilenko

The following players received entry as lucky losers:

- (Bolivia) Hugo Dellien
- (Sweden) Markus Eriksson

== Women's singles main draw entrants ==
=== Seeds ===
Country	Player	Rank^{1}	Seed
BEL	Marie Benoît	422	1
FRA	Estelle Cascino	481	2
ROU	Daiana Negreanu	532	3
SVK	Kristína Schmiedlová	547	4
CZE	Monika Kilnarová	586	5
SRB	Bojana Marinković	594	6
FRA	Clothilde de Bernardi	728	7
FIN	Piia Suomalainen	769	8

- ^{1} Rankings as of 17 July 2017.

=== Other entrants ===
The following players received wildcards into the singles main draw:

- (Finland) Ella Haavisto
- (Finland) Ella Leivo
- (Finland) Monica Malinen
- (Finland) Mariella Minetti

The following players received entry from the qualifying draw:

- (Czech Republic) Monika Kilnarová
- (Russia) Aleksandra Kuznetsova
- (Sweden) Nelly Mezan
- (Ukraine) Gyulnara Nazarova
- (Finland) Peppi Ramstedt
- (Finland) Saana Saarteinen
- (Slovakia) Kristína Schmiedlová
- (Finland) Liisa Vehvilainen

== Champions ==
=== Men's singles ===
- (France) Calvin Hemery def. (Portugal) Pedro Sousa 6–3, 6–4.

=== Women's singles ===
- (Czech Republic) Monika Kilnarová def. (Belgium) Marie Benoît, 7–6^{(7–5)}, 6–7^{(5–7)}, 6–4

=== Men's doubles ===
- (Belgium) Sander Gillé / (Belgium) Joran Vliegen def. (Mexico) Lucas Gómez / (Argentina) Juan Ignacio Londero 6–2, 6–7^{(5–7)}, [10–3].

=== Women's doubles ===
- (Russia) Anna Iakovleva / (Ukraine) Gyulnara Nazarova def. (Belgium) Marie Benoît / (France) Estelle Cascino, walkover
