= 2014 Tampere Open – Women's doubles =

Women's doubles
- 2014 Tampere Open

Final
- Champions: (Australia) Alexandra Nancarrow (Greece) Maria Sakkari
- Runners-up: (Finland) Emma Laine (Russia) Anastasia Pivovarova
- Score: 6–2, 6–3

Events
Singles	men	women
Doubles	men	women
← 2013 ·	Tampere Open	· 2015 →

Julia Wachaczyk and Nina Zander were the defending champions, but neither player competed this year.

Alexandra Nancarrow and Maria Sakkari won the tournament, defeating Emma Laine and Anastasia Pivovarova in the final, 6–2, 6–3.

== Seeds ==
1. (Australia) Alexandra Nancarrow / (Greece) Maria Sakkari (champions)
2. (Russia) Alina Silich / (Russia) Liubov Vasilyeva (semifinals)
3. (Finland) Emma Laine / (Russia) Anastasia Pivovarova (final)
4. (Italy) Deborah Chiesa / (Belgium) Hélène Scholsen (quarterfinals)

== Draw ==
=== Key ===
- Q = Qualifier
- WC = Wild card
- LL = Lucky loser
- Alt = Alternate
- SE = Special exempt
- PR = Protected ranking
- ITF = ITF entry
- JE = Junior exempt
- w/o = Walkover
- r = Retired
- d = Defaulted
- SR = Special ranking

First round
1	(Australia) A Nancarrow (Greece) M Sakkari	6	6
WC	(Finland) M Minetti (Finland) K Parviainen	1	1
(Finland) A Sillanpää (United States) A Theodossiou	6	1	[7]
WC	(Finland) J Rissanen (Finland) S Saarteinen	2	6	[10]
4	(Italy) D Chiesa (Belgium) H Scholsen	6	7
WC	(Denmark) K Barbat (Denmark) AS Rasmussen	0	5
(Sweden) R Poikajärvi (Norway) C Rohde-Moe	6	4	[9]
(Poland) P Czarnik (Russia) A Lysakova	2	6	[11]
(Sweden) B Cedermark (Sweden) E Virtanen	6^{5}	6	[10]
(Finland) E Leivo (Finland) T Tuomi	7^{7}	4	[6]
(Finland) M-E Pasanen (Finland) O Pimiä	0	0
3	(Finland) E Laine (Russia) A Pivovarova	6	6
(Finland) N Nylund (Finland) R Timonen	0	3
(Russia) A Iakovleva (Greece) A Kairi	6	6
(Finland) MN Eklund (Netherlands) J Schoelink	6	3	[7]
2	(Russia) A Silich (Russia) L Vasilyeva	2	6	[10]

Quarterfinals
1	(Australia) A Nancarrow (Greece) M Sakkari	6	6
WC	(Finland) J Rissanen (Finland) S Saarteinen	0	0
4	(Italy) D Chiesa (Belgium) H Scholsen	6	5	[7]
(Poland) P Czarnik (Russia) A Lysakova	2	7	[10]
(Sweden) B Cedermark (Sweden) E Virtanen	3	1
3	(Finland) E Laine (Russia) A Pivovarova	6	6
(Russia) A Iakovleva (Greece) A Kairi	6^{2}	3
2	(Russia) A Silich (Russia) L Vasilyeva	7^{7}	6

Semifinals
1	(Australia) A Nancarrow (Greece) M Sakkari	6	6
(Poland) P Czarnik (Russia) A Lysakova	1	0
3	(Finland) E Laine (Russia) A Pivovarova	6	6
2	(Russia) A Silich (Russia) L Vasilyeva	2	3

Final
1	(Australia) A Nancarrow (Greece) M Sakkari	6	6
3	(Finland) E Laine (Russia) A Pivovarova	2	3
