= 2015 Tampere Open – Men's singles =

Men's singles
- 2015 Tampere Open

Final
- Champion: (France) Tristan Lamasine
- Runner-up: (Brazil) André Ghem
- Score: 6–3, 6–2

Events
Singles	men	women
Doubles	men	women
← 2014 ·	Tampere Open	· 2016 →

David Goffin was the defending champion, but decided not to participate this year.

Tristan Lamasine won the title, defeating André Ghem in the final, 6–3, 6–2.

== Seeds ==
1. (Finland) Jarkko Nieminen (semifinals)
2. (France) Lucas Pouille (withdrew)
3. (Austria) Jürgen Melzer (first round)
4. (Brazil) Andre Ghem (final)
5. (Estonia) Jürgen Zopp (quarterfinals)
6. (Belgium) Germain Gigounon (first round)
7. (France) Calvin Hemery (second round)
8. (Germany) Andreas Beck (quarterfinals, retired)
9. (Portugal) Rui Machado (first round)

== Draw ==
=== Key ===
- Q = Qualifier
- WC = Wild card
- LL = Lucky loser
- Alt = Alternate
- SE = Special exempt
- PR = Protected ranking
- ITF = ITF entry
- JE = Junior exempt
- w/o = Walkover
- r = Retired
- d = Defaulted
- SR = Special ranking

=== Finals ===
Semifinals
1	(Finland) Jarkko Nieminen	7	6^{6}	5
(France) Tristan Lamasine	5	7^{8}	7
4	(Brazil) André Ghem	6	6
WC	(Estonia) Vladimir Ivanov	4	3

Final
(France) Tristan Lamasine	6	6
4	(Brazil) André Ghem	3	2

=== Top half ===
First round
1	(Finland) J Nieminen	4	6	6
(Croatia) A Veić	6	3	4
Q	(Estonia) Anton Pavlov	6	6^{10}	6
LL	(Finland) Ristomatti Lanne	4	7^{12}	3
Q	(Finland) H Heliövaara	6	7
(Portugal) FF Silva	3	5
(Austria) D Novak	1	7	2
5	(Estonia) J Zopp	6	5	6
3	(Austria) J Melzer	3	4
(France) T Lamasine	6	6
(Serbia) P Krstin	6	6
(Italy) R Bellotti	3	2
PR	(Spain) J Martí	3	2
(Czech Republic) J Šátral	6	6
PR	(Spain) J Checa-Calvo	3	4
7	(France) C Hemery	6	6

Second round
1	(Finland) J Nieminen	6	6
Q	(Estonia) A Pavlov	1	3
Q	(Finland) H Heliövaara	6^{7}	3
5	(Estonia) J Zopp	7^{9}	6
(France) T Lamasine	4	7^{7}	7^{9}
(Serbia) P Krstin	6	6^{4}	6^{7}
(Czech Republic) J Šátral	6	6^{2}	6
7	(France) C Hemery	4	7^{7}	2

Quarterfinals
1	(Finland) J Nieminen	4	6	7^{7}
5	(Estonia) J Zopp	6	3	6^{4}
(France) T Lamasine	6	6
(Czech Republic) J Šátral	2	1

Semifinals
1	(Finland) J Nieminen	7	6^{6}	5
(France) T Lamasine	5	7^{8}	7

=== Bottom half ===
First round
6	(Belgium) G Gigounon	4	1
(France) M Hamou	6	6
WC	(Finland) M Kontinen	6	7^{7}
(France) G Mina	3	6^{5}
(France) A Musialek	3	6	4
(Switzerland) H Laaksonen	6	4	6
(France) J Eysseric	4	5
4	(Brazil) A Ghem	6	7
8	(Germany) A Beck	6	5	6
Q	(France) A Michon	1	7	4
(Bosnia and Herzegovina) T Brkić	6^{3}	3
WC	(Finland) P Niklas-Salminen	7^{7}	6
WC	(Finland) H Sillanpää	2	6	6^{5}
Q	(Russia) Alexander Vasilenko	6	3	7^{7}
WC	(Estonia) V Ivanov	2	6	6
9	(Portugal) R Machado	6	4	2

Second round
(France) M Hamou	7^{7}	6
WC	(Finland) M Kontinen	6^{2}	2
(Switzerland) H Laaksonen	3	3
4	(Brazil) A Ghem	6	6
8	(Germany) A Beck	7	6
WC	(Finland) P Niklas-Salminen	5	3
Q	(Russia) A Vasilenko	5	6^{2}
WC	(Estonia) V Ivanov	7	7^{7}

Quarterfinals
(France) M Hamou	6^{6}	1
4	(Brazil) A Ghem	7^{8}	6
8	(Germany) A Beck	7^{7}	2^{r}
WC	(Estonia) V Ivanov	6^{2}	5

Semifinals
4	(Brazil) A Ghem	6	6
WC	(Estonia) V Ivanov	4	3
