= 2014 Tampere Open – Women's singles =

Women's singles
- 2014 Tampere Open

Final
- Champion: (Greece) Maria Sakkari
- Runner-up: (Russia) Anastasia Pivovarova
- Score: 6–4, 7–5

Events
Singles	men	women
Doubles	men	women
← 2013 ·	Tampere Open	· 2015 →

Karen Barbat was the defending champion, but lost in the second round to Angeliki Kairi.

Maria Sakkari won the title, defeating Anastasia Pivovarova in the final, 6–4, 7–5.

== Seeds ==
1. (Greece) Maria Sakkari (champion)
2. (Australia) Alexandra Nancarrow (semifinals)
3. (Denmark) Karen Barbat (second round)
4. (Russia) Anastasia Pivovarova (final)
5. (Sweden) Beatrice Cedermark (semifinals)
6. (Russia) Liubov Vasilyeva (quarterfinals)
7. (Italy) Deborah Chiesa (quarterfinals)
8. (Netherlands) Jade Schoelink (first round)

== Main draw ==
=== Key ===
- Q = Qualifier
- WC = Wild card
- LL = Lucky loser
- Alt = Alternate
- SE = Special exempt
- PR = Protected ranking
- ITF = ITF entry
- JE = Junior exempt
- w/o = Walkover
- r = Retired
- d = Defaulted
- SR = Special ranking

=== Finals ===
Semifinals
1	(Greece) Maria Sakkari	6	6
5	(Sweden) Beatrice Cedermark	2	4
4	(Russia) Anastasia Pivovarova	6	7^{7}
2	(Australia) Alexandra Nancarrow	1	6^{2}

Final
1	(Greece) Maria Sakkari	6	7
4	(Russia) Anastasia Pivovarova	4	5

=== Top half ===
First round
1	(Greece) M Sakkari	6	6
WC	(Finland) N Nylund	0	0
(Finland) S Saarteinen	1	1
(Russia) A Silich	6	6
Q	(Finland) M Minetti	6	6
Q	(Latvia) LL Strīķe	1	1
WC	(Finland) M-E Pasanen	2	0
6	(Russia) L Vasilyeva	6	6
3/Q	(Denmark) K Barbat	6	7^{7}
(Poland) P Czarnik	2	6^{4}
(Greece) A Kairi	6	6
WC	(Finland) T Tuomi	1	2
Q	(Norway) A Raaholt	6	6
Q	(Russia) A Kulikova	3	3
(Finland) E Leivo	4	3
5	(Sweden) B Cedermark	6	6

Second round
1	(Greece) M Sakkari	6	6
(Russia) A Silich	1	2
Q	(Finland) M Minetti	0	1
6	(Russia) L Vasilyeva	6	6
3/Q	(Denmark) K Barbat	6	1	3
(Greece) A Kairi	3	6	6
Q	(Norway) A Raaholt	2	4
5	(Sweden) B Cedermark	6	6

Quarterfinals
1	(Greece) M Sakkari	6	6
6	(Russia) L Vasilyeva	2	1
(Greece) A Kairi	0	6	4
5	(Sweden) B Cedermark	6	1	6

Semifinals
1	(Greece) M Sakkari	6	6
5	(Sweden) B Cedermark	2	4

=== Bottom half ===
First round
7	(Italy) D Chiesa	6	6
Q	(Finland) K Parviainen	1	1
(Sweden) E Virtanen	6	7
(Finland) MN Eklund	2	5
(Russia) A Lysakova	1	5
Q	(Russia) V Urzhumova	6	7
(Finland) O Pimiä	0	0
4	(Russia) A Pivovarova	6	6
8	(Netherlands) J Schoelink	3	1
(Finland) E Laine	6	6
(Finland) R Timonen	2	6^{10}
Q	(Russia) A Iakovleva	6	7^{12}
(Sweden) R Poikajärvi	5	2
(Belgium) H Scholsen	7	6
(Russia) N Belova	1	3
2	(Australia) A Nancarrow	6	6

Second round
7	(Italy) D Chiesa	7^{8}	6
(Sweden) E Virtanen	6^{6}	1
Q	(Russia) V Urzhumova	2	0
4	(Russia) A Pivovarova	6	6
(Finland) E Laine	6	6
Q	(Russia) A Iakovleva	1	0
(Belgium) H Scholsen	1	3
2	(Australia) A Nancarrow	6	6

Quarterfinals
7	(Italy) D Chiesa	2	2
4	(Russia) A Pivovarova	6	6
(Finland) E Laine	4	7	1
2	(Australia) A Nancarrow	6	5	6

Semifinals
4	(Russia) A Pivovarova	6	7^{7}
2	(Australia) A Nancarrow	1	6^{2}
