= 2018 Tampere Open – Men's singles =

Men's singles
- 2018 Tampere Open

Final
- Champion: (Netherlands) Tallon Griekspoor
- Runner-up: (Argentina) Juan Ignacio Londero
- Score: 6–3, 2–6, 6–3

Events
Singles	men	women
Doubles	men	women
← 2017 ·	Tampere Open	· 2019 →

Calvin Hemery was the defending champion but chose not to defend his title.

Tallon Griekspoor won the title after defeating Juan Ignacio Londero 6–3, 2–6, 6–3 in the final.

== Seeds ==
1. (Bolivia) Hugo Dellien (semifinals)
2. (Portugal) Pedro Sousa (first round)
3. (Argentina) Juan Ignacio Londero (final)
4. (Argentina) Marco Trungelliti (quarterfinals)
5. (Poland) Kamil Majchrzak (quarterfinals)
6. (Netherlands) Tallon Griekspoor (champion)
7. (France) Antoine Hoang (quarterfinals)
8. (France) Gleb Sakharov (first round)

== Draw ==
=== Key ===
- Q = Qualifier
- WC = Wild card
- LL = Lucky loser
- Alt = Alternate
- SE = Special exempt
- PR = Protected ranking
- ITF = ITF entry
- JE = Junior exempt
- w/o = Walkover
- r = Retired
- d = Defaulted
- SR = Special ranking

=== Finals ===
Semifinals
1	(Bolivia) Hugo Dellien	4	2
3	(Argentina) Juan Ignacio Londero	6	6
6	(Netherlands) Tallon Griekspoor	6	7
Q	(France) Tristan Lamasine	4	5

Final
3	(Argentina) Juan Ignacio Londero	3	6	3
6	(Netherlands) Tallon Griekspoor	6	2	6

=== Top half ===
First round
1	(Bolivia) H Dellien	6	4
WC	(Estonia) K Raisma	3	1^{r}
Q	(Netherlands) J Sels	6	6
(Argentina) A Collarini	4	3
(Spain) C Gómez-Herrera	2^{r}
PR	(Italy) R Bellotti	3
(Argentina) Patricio Heras	1	4
5	(Poland) K Majchrzak	6	6
3	(Argentina) JI Londero	6	7
(Spain) R Ortega Olmedo	1	5
Q	(Italy) R Marcora	6	6
WC	(Finland) E Ruusuvuori	3	4
WC	(Finland) P Niklas-Salminen	2	6^{5}
Q	(Russia) I Gakhov	6	7^{7}
WC	(Finland) H Heliövaara	0	4
7	(France) A Hoang	6	6

Second round
1	(Bolivia) H Dellien	6	7
Q	(Netherlands) J Sels	4	5
PR	(Italy) R Bellotti	0	1
5	(Poland) K Majchrzak	6	6
3	(Argentina) JI Londero	3	6	6
Q	(Italy) R Marcora	6	4	2
Q	(Russia) I Gakhov	5	6	1
7	(France) A Hoang	7	2	6

Quarterfinals
1	(Bolivia) H Dellien	6^{5}	6	6
5	(Poland) K Majchrzak	7^{7}	3	1
3	(Argentina) JI Londero	7^{7}	6
7	(France) A Hoang	6^{5}	4

Semifinals
1	(Bolivia) H Dellien	4	2
3	(Argentina) JI Londero	6	6

=== Bottom half ===
First round
6	(Netherlands) T Griekspoor	6	6
(France) G Blancaneaux	1	3
(Uruguay) M Cuevas	6	4	6
(Argentina) P Cachin	3	6	3
SE	(Belgium) K Coppejans	6	6
(Brazil) J Souza	3	4
(Turkey) C İlkel	6	3	4
4	(Argentina) M Trungelliti	3	6	6
8	(France) G Sakharov	6^{1}	2
(Italy) F Baldi	7^{7}	6
(Spain) M Vilella Martínez	3	3^{r}
Q	(France) T Lamasine	6	4
(Spain) N Kuhn	6^{5}	1
(Netherlands) T de Bakker	7^{7}	6
(France) E Benchetrit	6	6
2	(Portugal) P Sousa	3	2

Second round
6	(Netherlands) T Griekspoor	6	6
(Uruguay) M Cuevas	4	4
SE	(Belgium) K Coppejans	6^{5}	7^{7}	5
4	(Argentina) M Trungelliti	7^{7}	6^{4}	7
(Italy) F Baldi	4	5
Q	(France) T Lamasine	6	7
(Netherlands) T de Bakker	6	3	6
(France) E Benchetrit	4	6	1

Quarterfinals
6	(Netherlands) T Griekspoor	6	6
4	(Argentina) M Trungelliti	3	3
Q	(France) T Lamasine	7^{7}	6
(Netherlands) T de Bakker	6^{2}	1

Semifinals
6	(Netherlands) T Griekspoor	6	7
Q	(France) T Lamasine	4	5
