= 2014 Tampere Open – Men's singles =

Men's singles
- 2014 Tampere Open

Final
- Champion: (Belgium) David Goffin
- Runner-up: (Finland) Jarkko Nieminen
- Score: 7–6^{(7–3)}, 6–3

Events
Singles	men	women
Doubles	men	women
← 2013 ·	Tampere Open	· 2015 →

Jesse Huta Galung was the defending champion of the tennis tournament.

David Goffin won the title, defeating Jarkko Nieminen 7–6^{(7–3)}, 6–3

== Seeds ==
1. (Finland) Jarkko Nieminen (final)
2. (Belgium) David Goffin (champion)
3. (Bosnia and Herzegovina) Damir Džumhur (second round)
4. (Portugal) Gastão Elias (second round)
5. (Netherlands) Jesse Huta Galung (second round)
6. (Brazil) Rogério Dutra Silva (quarterfinals)
7. (Netherlands) Boy Westerhof (first round)
8. (Belgium) Niels Desein (first round)

== Draw ==
=== Key ===
- Q = Qualifier
- WC = Wild card
- LL = Lucky loser
- Alt = Alternate
- SE = Special exempt
- PR = Protected ranking
- ITF = ITF entry
- JE = Junior exempt
- w/o = Walkover
- r = Retired
- d = Defaulted
- SR = Special ranking

=== Finals ===
Semifinals
1	(Finland) Jarkko Nieminen	6	6
PR	(Ecuador) Giovanni Lapentti	3	4
(Serbia) Peđa Krstin	4	2
2	(Belgium) David Goffin	6	6

Final
1	(Finland) Jarkko Nieminen	6^{3}	3
2	(Belgium) David Goffin	7^{7}	6

=== Top half ===
First round
1	(Finland) J Nieminen	6	6
(Italy) G Quinzi	3	2
(Belgium) Y Mertens	6	6
WC	(Finland) Timi Kivijarvi	3	1
(Czech Republic) A Pavlásek	6	6
(Estonia) J Zopp	4	4
(Brazil) R Hocevar	0	2
6	(Brazil) R Dutra Silva	6	6
3	(Bosnia and Herzegovina) D Džumhur	6	6
WC	(Finland) H Pöllänen	2	1
(Belgium) G Gigounon	1	3
PR	(Ecuador) G Lapentti	6	6
(Russia) A Karatsev	6	2	1
Q	(France) L Lokoli	4	6	6
Q	(Sweden) I Arvidsson	2	1
5	(Netherlands) J Huta Galung	6	6

Second round
1	(Finland) J Nieminen	6	6
(Belgium) Y Mertens	3	2
(Czech Republic) A Pavlásek	2	2
6	(Brazil) R Dutra Silva	6	6
3	(Bosnia and Herzegovina) D Džumhur	4	3
PR	(Ecuador) G Lapentti	6	6
Q	(France) L Lokoli	1	6	6
5	(Netherlands) J Huta Galung	6	4	1

Quarterfinals
1	(Finland) J Nieminen	6	6^{5}	7^{7}
6	(Brazil) R Dutra Silva	4	7^{7}	6^{3}
PR	(Ecuador) G Lapentti	6	6
Q	(France) L Lokoli	4	0

Semifinals
1	(Finland) J Nieminen	6	6
PR	(Ecuador) G Lapentti	3	4

=== Bottom half ===
First round
7	(Netherlands) B Westerhof	4	1
(Serbia) P Krstin	6	6
(Spain) J Samper Montaña	1	4
(France) M Teixeira	6	6
(Spain) R Ramírez Hidalgo	7^{7}	6
(France) TK Wang	6^{4}	2
Q	(Finland) H Heliövaara	1	3
4	(Portugal) G Elias	6	6
8	(Belgium) N Desein	7^{7}	2	4
WC	(Finland) H Sillanpää	6^{4}	6	6
Q	(Sweden) E Ymer	6	6
(Netherlands) A van der Duim	0	2
WC	(Finland) M Kontinen	6	5	6
(Spain) Marc Giner	3	7	3
(Spain) D Muñoz de la Nava	3	4
2	(Belgium) D Goffin	6	6

Second round
(Serbia) P Krstin	7^{7}	6
(France) M Teixeira	6^{4}	2
(Spain) R Ramírez Hidalgo	7^{9}	6
4	(Portugal) G Elias	6^{7}	4
WC	(Finland) H Sillanpää	4	3
Q	(Sweden) E Ymer	6	6
WC	(Finland) M Kontinen	2	0
2	(Belgium) D Goffin	6	6

Quarterfinals
(Serbia) P Krstin	6	5	7^{7}
(Spain) R Ramírez Hidalgo	3	7	6^{3}
Q	(Sweden) E Ymer	2	1
2	(Belgium) D Goffin	6	6

Semifinals
(Serbia) P Krstin	4	2
2	(Belgium) D Goffin	6	6
