= 2014 Tampere Open – Men's doubles =

Men's doubles
- 2014 Tampere Open

Final
- Champions: (Philippines) Ruben Gonzales (United Kingdom) Sean Thornley
- Runners-up: (Sweden) Elias Ymer (Russia) Anton Zaitcev
- Score: 6–7^{(5–7)}, 7–6^{(12–10)}, [10–8]

Events
Singles	men	women
Doubles	men	women
← 2013 ·	Tampere Open	· 2015 →

Henri Kontinen and Goran Tošić were the defending champions, but both players chose not to defend their title.

Ruben Gonzales and Sean Thornley won the title, beating Elias Ymer and Anton Zaitcev 6–7^{(5–7)}, 7–6^{(12–10)}, [10–8]

== Seeds ==
1. (Netherlands) Jesse Huta Galung / (Sweden) Andreas Siljeström (semifinals)
2. (Netherlands) Antal van der Duim / (Netherlands) Boy Westerhof (first round)
3. (Philippines) Ruben Gonzales / (United Kingdom) Sean Thornley (champion)
4. (Republic of Ireland) James Cluskey / (United Kingdom) Darren Walsh (quarterfinals)

== Draw ==
=== Key ===
- Q = Qualifier
- WC = Wild card
- LL = Lucky loser
- Alt = Alternate
- SE = Special exempt
- PR = Protected ranking
- ITF = ITF entry
- JE = Junior exempt
- w/o = Walkover
- r = Retired
- d = Defaulted
- SR = Special ranking

=== Draw ===
First round
1	(Netherlands) J Huta Galung (Sweden) A Siljeström	6	6
WC	(Finland) P Niklas-Salminen (Finland) E Vasa	4	1
(Brazil) R Dutra Silva (Venezuela) R Maytín	6	6
(Belgium) N Desein (Belgium) Y Mertens	3	2
4	(Republic of Ireland) J Cluskey (United Kingdom) D Walsh	7^{7}	3	[10]
(Finland) H Kontinen (Estonia) J Zopp	6^{4}	6	[7]
WC	(France) L Lokoli (Finland) H Sillanpää	3	6	[8]
(Sweden) E Ymer (Russia) A Zaitcev	6	4	[10]
(Belgium) G Gigounon (Belgium) D Goffin	6	6
WC	(Finland) H Heliövaara (Finland) H Pöllänen	3	2
(Spain) D Muñoz de la Nava (Spain) R Ramírez Hidalgo
3	(Philippines) R Gonzales (United Kingdom) S Thornley	w/o
(Sweden) I Arvidsson (Sweden) M Eriksson	3	3
(Spain) Marc Giner (Spain) J Samper Montaña	6	6
(Bosnia and Herzegovina) D Džumhur (Czech Republic) A Pavlásek	6	7
2	(Netherlands) A van der Duim (Netherlands) B Westerhof	3	5

Quarterfinals
1	(Netherlands) J Huta Galung (Sweden) A Siljeström	3	6	[10]
(Brazil) R Dutra Silva (Venezuela) R Maytín	6	4	[4]
4	(Republic of Ireland) J Cluskey (United Kingdom) D Walsh	6^{8}	6	[5]
(Sweden) E Ymer (Russia) A Zaitcev	7^{10}	4	[10]
(Belgium) G Gigounon (Belgium) D Goffin	2	3
3	(Philippines) R Gonzales (United Kingdom) S Thornley	6	6
(Spain) M Giner (Spain) J Samper Montaña	3	3
(Bosnia and Herzegovina) D Džumhur (Czech Republic) A Pavlásek	6	6

Semifinals
1	(Netherlands) J Huta Galung (Sweden) A Siljeström	7	2	[8]
(Sweden) E Ymer (Russia) A Zaitcev	5	6	[10]
3	(Philippines) R Gonzales (United Kingdom) S Thornley	w/o
(Bosnia and Herzegovina) D Džumhur (Czech Republic) A Pavlásek

Final
(Sweden) E Ymer (Russia) A Zaitcev	7^{7}	6^{10}	[8]
3	(Philippines) R Gonzales (United Kingdom) S Thornley	6^{5}	7^{12}	[10]
