= 2018 Tampere Open – Men's doubles =

Men's doubles
- 2018 Tampere Open

Final
- Champions: (Sweden) Markus Eriksson (Sweden) André Göransson
- Runners-up: (Russia) Ivan Gakhov (Russia) Alexander Pavlioutchenkov
- Score: 6–3, 3–6, [10–7]

Events
Singles	men	women
Doubles	men	women
← 2017 ·	Tampere Open	· 2019 →

Sander Gillé and Joran Vliegen were the defending champions but chose not to defend their title.

Markus Eriksson and André Göransson won the title after defeating Ivan Gakhov and Alexander Pavlioutchenkov 6–3, 3–6, [10–7] in the final.

== Seeds ==
1. (Philippines) Ruben Gonzales / (United States) Nathaniel Lammons (semifinals)
2. (Russia) Ivan Gakhov / (Russia) Alexander Pavlioutchenkov (final)
3. (Venezuela) Luis David Martínez / (Netherlands) Mark Vervoort (quarterfinals)
4. (Finland) Harri Heliövaara / (Finland) Patrik Niklas-Salminen (semifinals)

== Draw ==
=== Key ===
- Q = Qualifier
- WC = Wild card
- LL = Lucky loser
- Alt = Alternate
- SE = Special exempt
- PR = Protected ranking
- ITF = ITF entry
- JE = Junior exempt
- w/o = Walkover
- r = Retired
- d = Defaulted
- SR = Special ranking

First round
1	(Philippines) R Gonzales (United States) N Lammons	w/o
WC	(Estonia) K Raisma (Finland) E Ruusuvuori
(France) E Benchetrit (France) G Blancaneaux	6	6
(Poland) K Majchrzak (Poland) S Walków	1	4
3	(Venezuela) LD Martínez (Netherlands) M Vervoort	3	6	[10]
WC	(Italy) Fabrizio Ornago (Finland) E Vasa	6	3	[6]
(Argentina) A Collarini (Argentina) JI Londero	3	2
(Sweden) M Eriksson (Sweden) A Göransson	6	6
(France) T Lamasine (France) A Müller	4	3
WC	(Finland) O Virtanen (Finland) Panu Virtanen	6	6
Alt	(Brazil) P Sakamoto (Brazil) J Souza	1	1
4	(Finland) H Heliövaara (Finland) P Niklas-Salminen	6	6
(Hungary) G Borsos (France) G Sakharov	6	6
(Argentina) Patricio Heras (France) A Hoang	2	3
Alt	(Brazil) E Dischinger (Portugal) P Sousa	6	6^{4}	[6]
2	(Russia) I Gakhov (Russia) A Pavlioutchenkov	2	7^{7}	[10]

Quarterfinals
1	(Philippines) R Gonzales (United States) N Lammons	6	4	[10]
(France) E Benchetrit (France) G Blancaneaux	4	6	[5]
3	(Venezuela) LD Martínez (Netherlands) M Vervoort	3	7	[8]
(Sweden) M Eriksson (Sweden) A Göransson	6	5	[10]
WC	(Finland) O Virtanen (Finland) P Virtanen	2	0
4	(Finland) H Heliövaara (Finland) P Niklas-Salminen	6	6
(Hungary) G Borsos (France) G Sakharov	6^{5}	4
2	(Russia) I Gakhov (Russia) A Pavlioutchenkov	7^{7}	6

Semifinals
1	(Philippines) R Gonzales (United States) N Lammons	3	4
(Sweden) M Eriksson (Sweden) A Göransson	6	6
4	(Finland) H Heliövaara (Finland) P Niklas-Salminen	6	3	[10]
2	(Russia) I Gakhov (Russia) A Pavlioutchenkov	3	6	[12]

Final
(Sweden) M Eriksson (Sweden) A Göransson	6	3	[10]
2	(Russia) I Gakhov (Russia) A Pavlioutchenkov	3	6	[7]
