= 2018 Tampere Open =

- Date: 23–29 July
- Edition: 37th (men); 12th (women)
- Category: ATP Challenger Tour; ITF Women's Circuit
- Surface: Clay
- Location: Tampere, Finland

Champions

Men's singles
- (Netherlands) Tallon Griekspoor

Women's singles
- (United Kingdom) Francesca Jones

Men's doubles
- (Sweden) Markus Eriksson / (Sweden) André Göransson

Women's doubles
- (Paraguay) Camila Giangreco Campiz / (Serbia) Bojana Marinković
← 2017 ·	Tampere Open	· 2019 →

The 2018 Tampere Open was a professional tennis tournament played on clay courts. It was the 37th edition of the tournament which was part of the 2018 ATP Challenger Tour and the 2018 ITF Women's Circuit. It took place in Tampere, Finland, on 23–29 July 2018.

== Men's singles main draw entrants ==
=== Seeds ===
Country	Player	Rank^{1}	Seed
BOL	Hugo Dellien	106	1
POR	Pedro Sousa	136	2
ARG	Juan Ignacio Londero	137	3
ARG	Marco Trungelliti	188	4
POL	Kamil Majchrzak	196	5
NED	Tallon Griekspoor	222	6
FRA	Antoine Hoang	223	7
FRA	Gleb Sakharov	235	8

- ^{1} Rankings as of 16 July 2018.

=== Other entrants ===
The following players received wildcards into the singles main draw:

- (Finland) Harri Heliövaara
- (Finland) Patrik Niklas-Salminen
- (Estonia) Kenneth Raisma
- (Finland) Emil Ruusuvuori

The following player received entry into the singles main draw using a protected ranking:

- (Italy) Riccardo Bellotti

The following player received entry into the singles main draw as a special exempt:

- (Belgium) Kimmer Coppejans

The following players received entry from the qualifying draw:

- (Russia) Ivan Gakhov
- (France) Tristan Lamasine
- (Italy) Roberto Marcora
- (Netherlands) Jelle Sels

== Women's singles main draw entrants ==
=== Seeds ===
Country	Player	Rank^{1}	Seed
GBR	Francesca Jones	537	1
SRB	Bojana Marinković	603	2
PAR	Camila Giangreco Campiz	619	3
SWE	Marina Yudanov	659	4
RUS	Polina Bakhmutkina	752	5
RUS	Angelina Zhuravleva	799	6
ARG	Paula Barañano	927	7
AUS	Angelique Svinos	965	8

- ^{1} Rankings as of 16 July 2018.

=== Other entrants ===
The following players received wildcards into the singles main draw:

- (Finland) Ella Haavisto
- (Finland) Oona Orpana
- (Estonia) Katriin Saar
- (Finland) Liisa Vehviläinen

The following players received entry from the qualifying draw:

- (Russia) Alisa Axyanova
- (Romania) Anda Ghinga
- (Finland) Emilia Hartman
- (Russia) Svetlana Iansitova
- (Latvia) Irina Kuzmina-Rimša
- (Spain) Ana Lantigua de la Nuez
- (Finland) Mariella Minetti
- (Estonia) Maileen Nuudi

== Champions ==
=== Men's singles ===
- (Netherlands) Tallon Griekspoor def. (Argentina) Juan Ignacio Londero 6–3, 2–6, 6–3.

=== Women's singles ===
- (United Kingdom) Francesca Jones def. (Serbia) Bojana Marinković, 6–2, 7–6^{(7–2)}

=== Men's doubles ===
- (Sweden) Markus Eriksson / (Sweden) André Göransson def. (Russia) Ivan Gakhov / (Russia) Alexander Pavlioutchenkov 6–3, 3–6, [10–7].

=== Women's doubles ===
- (Paraguay) Camila Giangreco Campiz / (Serbia) Bojana Marinković def. (Russia) Polina Bakhmutkina / (Estonia) Elena Malõgina, 1–6, 6–4, [10–7]
