= 2011 Open de Moselle – Singles Qualifying =

2011 tennis event results

This article displays the qualifying draw of the 2011 Open de Moselle.

== Players ==
=== Seeds ===
1. (Germany) Mischa Zverev (qualifying competition)
2. (Netherlands) Igor Sijsling (qualified)
3. (Republic of Ireland) Conor Niland (first round)
4. (France) Jonathan Dasnières de Veigy (qualified)
5. (Sweden) Michael Ryderstedt (qualifying competition)
6. (France) Mathieu Rodrigues (qualified)
7. (France) Nicolas Renavand (qualified)
8. (Switzerland) Yann Marti (qualifying competition)

=== Qualifiers ===
1. (France) Mathieu Rodrigues
2. (Netherlands) Igor Sijsling
3. (France) Nicolas Renavand
4. (France) Jonathan Dasnières de Veigy

== Qualifying draw ==
=== First qualifier ===
First Round
1	(Germany) Mischa Zverev
bye
(Switzerland) Kevin Botti	2	1
6	(France) Mathieu Rodrigues	6	6

Qualifying Competition
1	(Germany) Mischa Zverev	3	5
6	(France) Mathieu Rodrigues	6	7

=== Second qualifier ===
First Round
2	(Netherlands) Igor Sijsling	7^{7}	6
(Brazil) André Sá	6^{5}	3
(Canada) Adil Shamasdin	0	0
5	(Sweden) Michael Ryderstedt	6	6

Qualifying Competition
2	(Netherlands) Igor Sijsling	7^{7}	4	6
5	(Sweden) Michael Ryderstedt	6^{4}	6	2

=== Third qualifier ===
First Round
3	(Republic of Ireland) Conor Niland	3	4
(Germany) Frank Moser	6	6
(France) Tristan Lamasine	5	2
7	(France) Nicolas Renavand	7	6

Qualifying Competition
(Germany) Frank Moser	4	6^{5}
7	(France) Nicolas Renavand	6	7^{7}

=== Fourth qualifier ===
First Round
4	(France) Jonathan Dasnières de Veigy	6	6
WC	(Germany) Alexander Zverev	1	1
WC	(France) Tristan Gabriel	2	4
8	(Switzerland) Yann Marti	6	6

Qualifying Competition
4	(France) Jonathan Dasnières de Veigy	6	6^{2}	6
8	(Switzerland) Yann Marti	3	7^{7}	4
