= Alexander Pavlioutchenkov =

Russian tennis player

- Country (sports): Russia
- Born: 3 December 1985 (age 40) Samara, Russia
- Height: 1.96 m (6 ft 5 in)
- Plays: Right-handed (one-handed backhand)
- Prize money: US $54,512

Singles
- Career record: 0–0
- Career titles: 0
- Highest ranking: No. 704 (8 September 2003)

Doubles
- Career record: 0–0
- Career titles: 0; 1 Challenger
- Highest ranking: No. 161 (17 December 2018)
- Last updated on: 18 July 2022.

Alexander Pavlioutchenkov (born 3 December 1985) is a Russian tennis player.

Pavlioutchenkov has a career high ATP singles ranking of world No. 704 achieved on 8 September 2003. He also has a career high doubles ranking of No. 161 achieved on 17 December 2018.

Pavlioutchenkov has won 1 ATP Challenger doubles title. He is the brother of professional tennis player Anastasia Pavlyuchenkova.

== ATP Challenger Tour finals ==
=== Doubles: 3 (1 title, 2 runner-ups) ===
Legend ATP Challenger Tour (1–2)

Result	W–L	Date	Tournament	Tier	Surface	Partner	Opponents	Score
Win	1–0	Jun 2018	Fergana, Uzbekistan	Challenger	Hard	(Russia) Ivan Gakhov	(India) Saketh Myneni (India) Vijay Sundar Prashanth	6–4, 6–4
Loss	1–1	Jul 2018	Tampere, Finland	Challenger	Clay	(Russia) Ivan Gakhov	(Sweden) Markus Eriksson (Sweden) André Göransson	3–6, 6–3, [7–10]
Loss	1–2	Aug 2018	Jinan, China	Challenger	Hard	(Kazakhstan) Alexander Bublik	(Chinese Taipei) Hsieh Cheng-peng (Chinese Taipei) Yang Tsung-hua	6–7^{(5–7)}, 6–4, [5–10]
