= Helen Rand Parish =

American writer (1912–2005)

- Born: October 10, 1912; Waterbury, Connecticut, U.S.
- Died: April 28, 2005 (aged 92); Berkeley, California, U.S.
- Education: Yale
- Occupations: Writer, Ghostwriter, Research Associate
- Writing career
- Genres: Non-Fiction, Juvenile Fiction
- Subjects: Bartolomé de las Casas, Latin America

Helen Rand Parish (October 10, 1912 – April 28, 2005) was an American writer, linguist, and social justice scholar.

== Early life and education ==
Parish and her twin sister, Olive, were born in Waterbury, Connecticut, on October 10, 1912. At a young age, the twins became research subjects of Arnold Gesell, a child development pioneer who founded the Yale Clinic of Child Development. The twins graduated summa cum laude from college and went on to receive master's degrees in American literature from Yale University by the age of 17. The Parish sisters also did graduate studies on Latin American problems at USC. Helen went on to study at the National University in Mexico City and eventually moved to Berkeley in 1936, where she settled. Parish was drawn there by Latin American scholar Eugene Bolton, who accepted both Helen and Olive into his seminar on 16th-Century Spanish colonial history.

== Writing ==
Parish began her writing career in journalism, first with the Atlanta Constitution, writing with her sister under the joint byline "The Parish Twins," and later for other papers including the New York Daily Mirror and the New York Times. They frequently collaborated on stories with their mother who was also a writer.

Parish worked as a free-lance writer, ghost-writing a number of books for Viking Press, as well as pursuing her scholarly interests at Bancroft Library at UC Berkeley. Parish eventually became a research associate there, where she assembled the world's largest collection of rare Las Casas books and documents.

As a bi-lingual writer, Parish wrote in English and Spanish, focusing mainly on non-fiction books and essays on the life and writings of Bartolomé de las Casas, as well as themes of Christianity and Central America, the relationship between Latin America and the United States, and Spanish American literature. Parish co-wrote with Henry Raup Wagner: "The Life and Writings of Bartolome de Las Casas" (1967). Additionally, Parish wrote three juvenile fiction books, all with different ancient history motifs. Parish was a strong supporter for the canonization of Bartolome de las Casas. Understanding that canonizations can take centuries, Parish remarked in 1992: "I have never asked to live to see the canonization, only to finish my work."

At Cesar Chavez Park in Berkeley, California, a memorial plaque for Parish sits attached to a large rock.
