= Alexandra Nancarrow =

Australian tennis player (born 1993)

- Country (sports): Australia
- Height: 1.65 m (5 ft 5 in)
- Plays: Right (one-handed backhand)
- Prize money: $48,310

Singles
- Career record: 130–96
- Career titles: 4 ITF
- Highest ranking: No. 385 (10 November 2014)

Doubles
- Career record: 134–62
- Career titles: 20 ITF
- Highest ranking: No. 346 (2 February 2015)

Grand Slam doubles results
- Australian Open: 1R (2015)

Alexandra Nancarrow is an Australian former tennis player. Nancarrow has a career-high singles ranking by the WTA of 385, achieved on 10 November 2014. On 2 February 2015, she reached a doubles career-high of world No. 346. In her career, Nancarrow won four singles and 20 doubles titles on the ITF Circuit.

Nancarrow made her WTA Tour debut at the 2015 Hobart International, in the doubles event, partnering Storm Sanders. The following week, she made her professional major debut at the 2015 Australian Open, partnering Maddison Inglis in the women's doubles.

== ITF finals ==
=== Singles (4–5) ===
Legend $25,000 tournaments $10,000 tournaments	Finals by surface Hard (0–1) Clay (4–4)

Outcome	No.	Date	Location	Surface	Opponent	Score
Runner-up	1.	20 June 2012	Melilla, Spain	Hard	(Spain) Rocío de la Torre Sánchez	0–6, 5–7
Runner-up	2.	29 June 2014	Prokuplje, Serbia	Clay	(Ukraine) Elizaveta Ianchuk	6–1, 5–7, 3–6
Winner	1.	6 July 2014	Prokuplje, Serbia	Clay	(North Macedonia) Lina Gjorcheska	4–6, 6–4, 6–2
Runner-up	3.	28 September 2014	Pula, Italy	Clay	(Italy) Georgia Brescia	3–6, 3–6
Runner-up	4.	2 November 2014	Benicarló, Spain	Clay	(Venezuela) Andrea Gámiz	3–6, 1–6
Winner	2.	28 June 2015	Prokuplje, Serbia	Clay	(Serbia) Milana Špremo	6–1, 7–5
Winner	3.	5 July 2015	Prokuplje, Serbia	Clay	(Hungary) Lilla Barzó	6–1, 3–6, 6–1
Winner	4.	26 July 2015	Palić Open, Serbia	Clay	(Slovakia) Zuzana Zlochová	6–1, 6–4
Runner-up	5.	9 August 2015	Plovdiv, Bulgaria	Clay	(France) Margot Yerolymos	2–6, 1–6

=== Doubles (20–11) ===
Legend $50,000 tournaments $25,000 tournaments $10,000 tournaments	Finals by surface Hard (1–1) Clay (18–10) Carpet (1–0)

Outcome	No.	Date	Location	Surface	Partner	Opponents	Score
Winner	1.	20 July 2012	Knokke, Belgium	Clay	(Spain) Beatriz Morales Hernández	(Argentina) Tatiana Búa (Portugal) Margarida Moura	6–1, 4–6, [10–6]
Runner-up	1.	28 July 2012	Bad Waltersdorf, Austria	Clay	(Austria) Katharina Negrin	(Hungary) Réka Luca Jani (Germany) Christina Shakovets	2–6, 0–6
Runner-up	2.	15 September 2013	Pula, Italy	Clay	(Germany) Laura Schaeder	(Italy) Giorgia Marchetti (Italy) Jasmine Paolini	6–7^{(3)}, 6–7^{(3)}
Winner	2.	20 October 2013	Heraklion, Greece	Carpet	(Netherlands) Rosalie van der Hoek	(Japan) Nozomi Fujioka (Thailand) Tanaporn Thongsing	6–3, 4–6, [10–7]
Runner-up	3.	15 November 2013	Oujda, Morocco	Clay	(Spain) Olga Parres Azcoitia	(Morocco) Lina Qostal (Madagascar) Zarah Razafimahatratra	3–6, 5–7
Winner	3.	22 November 2013	Fes, Morocco	Clay	(Spain) Olga Parres Azcoitia	(Austria) Anna Maria Heil (Austria) Pia König	6–4, 6–4
Winner	4.	29 November 2013	Fes, Morocco	Clay	(Spain) Olga Parres Azcoitia	(Morocco) Nadia Lalami (Ecuador) Charlotte Römer	7–6^{(2)}, 6–3
Winner	5.	23 February 2014	Palma Nova, Spain	Clay	(Colombia) Yuliana Lizarazo	(Netherlands) Anna Katalina Alzate (Serbia) Natalija Kostić	6–3, 6–4
Winner	6.	23 March 2014	Pula, Italy	Clay	(Colombia) Yuliana Lizarazo	(Italy) Alice Matteucci (Greece) Despina Papamichail	6–3, 4–6, [11–9]
Winner	7.	30 March 2014	Pula, Italy	Clay	(Spain) Olga Sáez Larra	(Greece) Despina Papamichail (Netherlands) Rosalie van der Hoek	6–3, 4–6, [10–8]
Winner	8.	25 May 2014	Sousse, Tunisia	Hard	(Spain) Olga Parres Azcoitia	(Mexico) Ana Sofía Sánchez (Slovakia) Chantal Škamlová	6–4, 6–2
Runner-up	4.	1 June 2014	Sousse, Tunisia	Hard	(Spain) Olga Parres Azcoitia	(France) Lou Brouleau (France) Brandy Mina	2–6, 6–2, [6–10]
Winner	9.	22 June 2014	Niš, Serbia	Clay	(Greece) Maria Sakkari	(North Macedonia) Lina Gjorcheska (Serbia) Marina Lazić	6–4, 6–2
Winner	10.	29 June 2014	Prokuplje, Serbia	Clay	(North Macedonia) Lina Gjorcheska	(Turkey) Hülya Esen (Turkey) Lütfiye Esen	6–2, 6–4
Winner	11.	6 July 2014	Prokuplje, Serbia	Clay	(North Macedonia) Lina Gjorcheska	(Ukraine) Olga Fridman (Ukraine) Elizaveta Ianchuk	6–4, 7–6^{(5)}
Runner-up	5.	13 July 2014	Getxo, Spain	Clay	(Spain) Olga Parres Azcoitia	(Ecuador) Charlotte Römer (Spain) Olga Sáez Larra	4–6, 5–7
Winner	12.	27 July 2014	Tampere, Finland	Clay	(Greece) Maria Sakkari	(Finland) Emma Laine (Russia) Anastasia Pivovarova	6–2, 6–3
Runner-up	6.	3 August 2014	Savitaipale, Finland	Clay	(Greece) Maria Sakkari	(Ukraine) Diana Bogoliy (Finland) Emma Laine	4–6, 6–7^{(2)}
Runner-up	7.	10 August 2014	Zaječar, Serbia	Clay	(Czech Republic) Barbora Štefková	(Ukraine) Elizaveta Ianchuk (Serbia) Natalija Kostić	3–6, 5–7
Runner-up	8.	23 August 2014	Duino-Aurisina, Italy	Clay	(Hungary) Naomi Totka	(Italy) Deborah Chiesa (Dominican Republic) Francesca Segarelli	6–7^{(3)}, 2–6
Winner	13.	30 August 2014	Caslano, Switzerland	Clay	(Netherlands) Eva Wacanno	(Italy) Angelica Moratelli (Switzerland) Lisa Sabino	6–0, 6–3
Winner	14.	14 September 2014	Lleida, Spain	Clay	(Ukraine) Elizaveta Ianchuk	(Spain) Yvonne Cavallé Reimers (Spain) Lucía Cervera Vázquez	6–1, 6–1
Runner-up	9.	2 November 2014	Benicarló, Spain	Clay	(Spain) Inés Ferrer Suárez	(Spain) Aliona Bolsova (Venezuela) Andrea Gámiz	4–6, 1–6
Winner	15.	23 November 2014	Nules, Spain	Clay	(Spain) Olga Sáez Larra	(Spain) Yvonne Cavallé Reimers (Spain) Aina Schaffner Riera	7–6^{(5)}, 7–6^{(5)}
Runner-up	10.	7 March 2015	Antalya, Turkey	Clay	(Germany) Kim Grajdek	(Sweden) Cornelia Lister (United Kingdom) Tara Moore	6–7^{(0)}, 5–7
Winner	16.	26 June 2015	Prokuplje, Serbia	Clay	(North Macedonia) Lina Gjorcheska	(Czech Republic) Dominika Paterová (Czech Republic) Vendula Žovincová	6–2, 6–2
Winner	17.	3 July 2015	Prokuplje, Serbia	Clay	(Spain) Estrella Cabeza Candela	(Ukraine) Maryna Kolb (Ukraine) Nadiya Kolb	2–6, 6–4, [10–6]
Winner	18.	9 July 2015	Getxo, Spain	Clay	(Spain) Lucía Cervera Vázquez	(Italy) Camilla Rosatello (France) Laëtitia Sarrazin	6–3, 7–5
Winner	19.	17 July 2015	Nieuwpoort, Belgium	Clay	(Russia) Maria Marfutina	(Czech Republic) Petra Krejsová (United Kingdom) Francesca Stephenson	6–0, 2–6, [10–5]
Runner-up	11.	24 July 2015	Palić Open, Serbia	Clay	(Serbia) Dajana Dukić	(Czech Republic) Nina Holanová (Slovakia) Barbara Kötelešová	3–6, 7–5, [6–10]
Winner	20.	7 August 2015	Plovdiv, Bulgaria	Clay	(Russia) Yana Sizikova	(Ukraine) Maryna Kolb (Ukraine) Nadiya Kolb	6–3, 6–3
