= Milka-Emilia Pasanen =

Finnish tennis player

- Full name: Milka-Emilia Pasanen
- Country (sports): Finland
- Born: 31 May 1997 (age 27); Pieksämäki, Finland
- Height: 1.73 m (5 ft 8 in)
- Prize money: $811

Singles
- Career record: 2–8
- Career titles: 0
- Highest ranking: —
- Current ranking: —

Doubles
- Career record: 0–5
- Career titles: 0
- Highest ranking: —
- Current ranking: —

Team competitions
- Fed Cup: 2–3

Milka-Emilia Pasanen (born 31 May 1997 in Pieksämäki) is a Finnish tennis player.

Playing for Finland at the Fed Cup, Pasanen has a win–loss record of 2–3. (Note: Milka-Emilia Pasanen at the Billie Jean King Cup (archived))
