= Vladimir Ivanov (tennis) =

Estonian tennis player

- Country (sports): Estonia
- Born: 10 April 1987 (age 39) Tallinn, then part of Estonian SSR, Soviet Union
- Plays: Right-handed (two-handed backhand)
- Prize money: $123,514

Singles
- Career record: 8–7
- Career titles: 0
- Highest ranking: No. 310 (27 July 2015)

Grand Slam singles results
- Australian Open Junior: Q2 (2005)

Doubles
- Career record: 1–3
- Career titles: 0
- Highest ranking: No. 408 (10 December 2018)

Team competitions
- Davis Cup: 25–15

Vladimir Ivanov (born 10 April 1987) is an Estonian tennis player. Ivanov has a career high ATP singles ranking of No. 310 achieved on 27 July 2015 and a career high ATP doubles ranking of No. 408 achieved on 10 December 2018. Ivanov has won 7 ITF singles titles and 15 doubles titles.

Despite relative success on the ITF Futures Tour, Ivanov has struggled at higher levels, only reaching one ATP Challenger Tour Semi-Final. This came in 2015 in Tampere, Finland, where he was defeated 4-6 3–6 by Andre Ghem.

Ivanov has represented Estonia at Davis Cup, in Davis Cup he has a win–loss record of 25–15.

== Future and Challenger finals ==
=== Singles: 22 (7–15) ===
Legend Challengers 0 (0–0) Futures 22 (7–15)	Titles by surface Hard (1–2) Clay (6–12) Carpet (0–1)	Titles by setting Outdoors (6–12) Indoors (1–3)

Outcome	No.	Date	Tournament	Surface	Opponent	Score
Runner-up	1.	August 6, 2011	Vilnius, Lithuania F1	Clay	(Chile) Hans Podlipnik-Castillo	3–6, 6–1, 5–7
Runner-up	2.	August 13, 2011	Vierumäki, Finland F1	Clay	(Finland) Timo Nieminen	3–6, 1–6
Runner-up	3.	August 20, 2011	Kotka, Finland F2	Clay	(Sweden) Patrik Rosenholm	1–6, 4–6
Winner	4.	November 19, 2011	Astana, Kazakhstan F6	Hard (i)	(Russia) Mikhail Fufygin	2–6, 6–3, 6–1
Runner-up	5.	July 28, 2012	Kuressaare, Estonia F2	Clay	(France) Laurent Recouderc	5–7, 6–7^{(3–7)}
Winner	6.	August 11, 2012	Vierumäki, Finland F1	Clay	(Sweden) Milos Sekulic	6–4, 6–2
Runner-up	7.	August 17, 2012	Kotka, Finland F2	Clay	(Spain) Juan Lizariturry	1–6, 6–7^{(5–7)}
Winner	8.	August 25, 2012	Nastola, Finland F3	Clay	(Sweden) Markus Eriksson	6–0, 4–6, 7–6^{(7–4)}
Runner-up	9.	July 27, 2013	Kuressaare, Estonia F2	Clay	(Latvia) Miķelis Lībietis	7–6^{(7–2)}, 6–7^{(3–7)}, 6–7^{(7–9)}
Runner-up	10.	August 24, 2013	Nastola, Finland F3	Clay	(Italy) Matteo Donati	1–6, 3–6
Runner-up	11.	April 19, 2014	Shymkent, Kazakhstan F6	Clay	(Russia) Alexander Lobkov	4–6, 2–6
Winner	12.	July 27, 2014	Tallinn, Estonia F2	Clay	(Latvia) Jānis Podžus	6–2, 7–6^{(12–10)}
Winner	13.	September 13, 2014	Vsevolozhsk, Russia F10	Clay	(Russia) Evgeny Tyurnev	6–1, 6–0
Runner-up	14.	May 2, 2015	Shymkent, Kazakhstan F4	Clay	(Belarus) Yaraslav Shyla	4–6, 3–6
Winner	15.	June 6, 2015	Kazan, Russia F2	Clay	(Russia) Ivan Nedelko	4–6, 6–4, 6–1
Runner-up	16.	August 1, 2015	Pärnu, Estonia F1	Clay	(Spain) Gerard Granollers	2–6, 4–6
Runner-up	17.	August 14, 2016	Moscow, Russia F5	Clay	(Russia) Evgeny Tyurnev	5–7, 4–6
Winner	18.	September 24, 2016	Shymkent, Kazakhstan F5	Clay	(Uzbekistan) Khumoyun Sultanov	7–5, 4–6, 7–6^{(9–7)}
Runner-up	19.	October 1, 2016	Shymkent, Kazakhstan F6	Clay	(Uzbekistan) Sanjar Fayziev	6–4, 3–6, 2–6
Runner-up	20.	October 30, 2016	Tartu, Estonia F2	Carpet (i)	(Estonia) Kenneth Raisma	4–6, 3–6
Runner-up	21.	November 12, 2016	Pärnu, Estonia F4	Hard (i)	(Netherlands) Botic van de Zandschulp	2–6, 4–6
Runner-up	22.	November 3, 2019	M15 Pärnu, Estonia	Hard (i)	(Russia) Evgenii Tiurnev	2–6, 6–7^{(2–7)}

=== Doubles: 42 (15–27) ===
Legend Challengers 0 (0–0) Futures 42 (15–27)	Titles by surface Hard (1–8) Clay (13–18) Carpet (1–1)	Titles by setting Outdoors (14–19) Indoors (1–8)

Outcome	No.	Date	Tournament	Surface	Partner	Opponents	Score
Runner-up	1.	July 31, 2011	Kuressaare, Estonia F2	Clay	(Chile) Hans Podlipnik-Castillo	(Latvia) Andis Juška (Latvia) Deniss Pavlovs	3–6, 6–7^{(3–7)}
Winner	2.	May 13, 2012	Båstad, Sweden F2	Clay	(Poland) Andriej Kapaś	(Australia) Peter Luczak (Australia) Blake Mott	6–4, 5–7, [10–4]
Runner-up	3.	July 22, 2012	Tallinn, Estonia F1	Clay	(Belarus) Nikolai Fidirko	(Netherlands) Jeroen Benard (Netherlands) Colin van Beem	5–7, 5–7
Runner-up	4.	July 29, 2012	Kuressaare, Estonia F2	Clay	(Russia) Ivan Nedelko	(Netherlands) Jeroen Benard (Netherlands) Mark Vervoort	6–4, 6–7^{(4–7)}, [5–10]
Runner-up	5.	August 5, 2012	Vilnius, Lithuania F1	Clay	(Russia) Ivan Nedelko	(Greece) Theodoros Angelinos (Netherlands) Mark Vervoort	w/o
Winner	6.	August 26, 2012	Nastola, Finland F3	Clay	(France) Alexandre Penaud	(Finland) Mika Julin (Finland) Verneri Tuomi	6–1, 6–1
Runner-up	7.	September 9, 2012	(Georgia (country)) Tbilisi, Georgia F1	Clay	(Russia) Ilia Shatskiy	(Ukraine) Vladyslav Manafov (Belarus) Yaraslav Shyla	1–6, 6–7^{(3–7)}
Runner-up	8.	March 24, 2013	Tyumen, Russia F3	Hard	(Belarus) Andrei Vasilevski	(Belarus) Aliaksandr Bury (Russia) Mikhail Fufygin	6–7^{(2–7)}, 3–6
Runner-up	9.	April 21, 2013	Sharm El Sheikh, Egypt F3	Clay	(Russia) Ivan Nedelko	(Austria) Gibril Diarra (Austria) Tristan-Samuel Weissborn	6–7^{(2–7)}, 6–3, [11–13]
Runner-up	10.	May 19, 2013	Kazan, Russia F6	Clay	(Belarus) Andrei Vasilevski	(Russia) Mikhail Fufygin (Russia) Andrei Levine	2–6, 4–6
Runner-up	11.	August 11, 2013	Vierumäki, Finland F1	Clay	(Russia) Yan Sabanin	(Finland) Micke Kontinen (France) Tak Khunn Wang	2–6, 3–6
Winner	12.	August 18, 2013	Kotka, Finland F2	Clay	(Russia) Yan Sabanin	(Finland) Herkko Pöllänen (Finland) Henrik Sillanpää	6–2, 4–6, [10–6]
Runner-up	13.	April 20, 2014	Shymkent, Kazakhstan F6	Clay	(Russia) Ivan Nedelko	(Belarus) Yaraslav Shyla (Belarus) Andrei Vasilevski	6–7^{(6–8)}, 0–6
Runner-up	14.	July 27, 2014	Tallinn, Estonia F2	Clay	(Russia) Yan Sabanin	(Estonia) Markus Kerner (Australia) Andrew Whittington	3–6, 3–6
Winner	15.	August 24, 2014	Moscow, Russia F8	Clay	(Russia) Yan Sabanin	(Russia) Evgeny Elistratov (Croatia) Franko Miočić	7–6^{(7–1)}, 6–0
Runner-up	16.	September 14, 2014	Vsevolozhsk, Russia F10	Clay	(Belarus) Andrei Vasilevski	(Kazakhstan) Alexander Bublik (Russia) Richard Muzaev	3–6, 6–3, [9–11]
Runner-up	17.	May 3, 2015	Shymkent, Kazakhstan F4	Clay	(Ukraine) Volodymyr Uzhylovskyi	(Belarus) Yaraslav Shyla (Belarus) Andrei Vasilevski	2–6, 6–7^{(4–7)}
Winner	18.	May 31, 2015	Moscow, Russia F1	Clay	(France) Jérôme Inzerillo	(Russia) Andrei Levine (Russia) Anton Zaitcev	3–6, 7–6^{(9–7)}, [10–7]
Winner	19.	August 2, 2015	Pärnu, Estonia F1	Clay	(Estonia) Markus Kerner	(Russia) Ilya Lebedev (Russia) Yan Sabanin	6–4, 4–6, [10–8]
Winner	20.	August 9, 2015	Moscow, Russia F5	Clay	(Belarus) Andrei Vasilevski	(Ukraine) Vladyslav Manafov (Netherlands) Mark Vervoort	6–2, 6–4
Winner	21.	May 22, 2016	Cherkasy, Ukraine F2	Clay	(Lithuania) Lukas Mugevičius	(Italy) Federico Maccari (Poland) Kamil Majchrzak	6–3, 6–3
Runner-up	22.	August 14, 2016	Moscow, Russia F5	Clay	(Argentina) Matías Zukas	(Chile) Cristóbal Saavedra Corvalán (Chile) Ricardo Urzúa Rivera	3–6, 3–6
Runner-up	23.	August 21, 2016	Moscow, Russia F6	Clay	(Argentina) Matías Zukas	(Russia) Evgeny Karlovskiy (Russia) Denis Matsukevich	3–6, 6–2, [8–10]
Winner	24.	September 25, 2016	Shymkent, Kazakhstan F5	Clay	(Russia) Mikhail Fufygin	(Uzbekistan) Jurabek Karimov (Kazakhstan) Roman Khassanov	7–5, 6–2
Runner-up	25.	October 2, 2016	Shymkent, Kazakhstan F6	Clay	(Russia) Mikhail Fufygin	(Kazakhstan) Timur Khabibulin (Uzbekistan) Khumoyun Sultanov	6–7^{(2–7)}, 3–6
Runner-up	26.	October 30, 2016	Tartu, Estonia F2	Carpet (i)	(Estonia) Kenneth Raisma	(Russia) Alexander Vasilenko (Belarus) Dzmitry Zhyrmont	5–7, 2–6
Runner-up	27.	November 13, 2016	Pärnu, Estonia F4	Hard (i)	(Estonia) Kenneth Raisma	(Ukraine) Marat Deviatiarov (Russia) Alexander Vasilenko	w/o
Runner-up	28.	March 19, 2017	Poitiers, France F6	Hard (i)	(Estonia) Kenneth Raisma	(France) Antoine Hoang (France) Grégoire Jacq	4–6, 4–6
Runner-up	29.	August 13, 2017	Hyvinkää, Finland F2	Clay	(Argentina) Matías Franco Descotte	(Sweden) Daniel Appelgren (Sweden) Linus Frost	4–6, 3–6
Runner-up	30.	September 24, 2017	Shymkent, Kazakhstan F6	Clay	(Russia) Mikhail Fufygin	(Ukraine) Artem Smirnov (Ukraine) Volodymyr Uzhylovskyi	4–6, 3–6
Runner-up	31.	February 25, 2018	Shymkent, Kazakhstan F2	Hard (i)	(Russia) Evgenii Tiurnev	(Ukraine) Vladyslav Manafov (Ukraine) Denys Molchanov	6–7^{(4–7)}, 6–3, [6–10]
Runner-up	32.	April 4, 2018	Moscow, Russia F1	Hard (i)	(Russia) Mikhail Fufygin	(Belarus) Sergey Betov (Belarus) Ivan Liutarevich	2–6, 4–6
Winner	33.	August 26, 2018	Moscow, Russia F7	Clay	(Russia) Mikhail Fufygin	(Russia) Victor Baluda (Russia) Alexander Pavlioutchenkov	6–1, 7–6^{(11–9)}
Winner	34.	September 23, 2018	Shymkent, Kazakhstan F7	Clay	(Russia) Mikhail Fufygin	(Russia) Yan Bondarevskiy (Russia) Matvey Minin	6–3, 6–3
Winner	35.	November 4, 2018	Tartu, Estonia F2	Carpet (i)	(Russia) Maxim Ratniuk	(Switzerland) Luca Castelnuovo (Bulgaria) Vasko Mladenov	6–4, 1–6, [10–4]
Runner-up	36.	November 11, 2018	Pärnu, Estonia F3	Hard (i)	(Russia) Maxim Ratniuk	(Latvia) Jānis Podžus (Latvia) Mārtiņš Podžus	3–6, 4–6
Winner	37.	July 21, 2019	M15 Pärnu, Estonia	Clay	(Russia) Maxim Ratniuk	(Estonia) Kenneth Raisma (Estonia) Jürgen Zopp	3–6, 6–4, [10–5]
Runner-up	38.	August 25, 2019	M15 Helsinki, Finland	Clay	(Estonia) Kristjan Tamm	(Poland) Daniel Kossek (Poland) Maciej Smoła	4–6, 2–6
Winner	39.	September 29, 2019	M15 Nanchang, China	Clay	(Russia) Yan Sabanin	(India) Anirudh Chandrasekar (India) Vijay Sundar Prashanth	6–4, 7–5
Runner-up	40.	November 3, 2019	M15 Pärnu, Estonia	Hard (i)	(Russia) Yan Sabanin	(Germany) Lasse Muscheites (Germany) Stefan Seifert	3–6, 6–3, [4–10]
Runner-up	41.	February 23, 2020	M25 Aktobe, Kazakhstan	Hard (i)	(Russia) Maxim Ratniuk	(Belarus) Ivan Liutarevich (Ukraine) Vladyslav Manafov	5–7, 6–7^{(5–7)}
Winner	42.	October 18, 2020	M15 Monastir, Tunisia	Hard	(Russia) Alibek Kachmazov	(Lithuania) Laurynas Grigelis (Lithuania) Lukas Mugevičius	6–4, 6–4
