= Lauri Kiiski =

Finnish tennis player (born 1980)

- Country (sports): Finland
- Born: 10 October 1980 (age 44); Tampere, Finland
- Plays: Right-handed
- Prize money: $40,189

Singles
- Career record: 0–1 (at ATP Tour level, Grand Slam level, and in Davis Cup)
- Career titles: 0 ITF
- Highest ranking: No. 427 (9 September 2002)

Doubles
- Career record: 2–1 (at ATP Tour level, Grand Slam level, and in Davis Cup)
- Career titles: 5 ITF
- Highest ranking: No. 300 (29 July 2002)
- Last updated on: 24 July 2017.

Lauri Kiiski (born 10 October 1980) is a Finnish tennis player.

Kiiski has a career high ATP singles ranking of 427 achieved on 9 September 2002. He also has a career high ATP doubles ranking of 300 achieved on 29 July 2002.

Kiiski represented Finland at the Davis Cup where he had a W/L record of 2–2.

His ITF Singles Ranking (8 July 2019) was 24
