= Henrik Sillanpää =

Finnish tennis player

- Full name: Henrik Sillanpää
- Country (sports): Finland
- Residence: Tampere, Finland
- Born: 24 January 1991 (age 35) Tampere, Finland
- Plays: Right-handed (two handed-backhand)
- Prize money: $29,723

Singles
- Career record: 0–1 (at ATP Tour level, Grand Slam level, and in Davis Cup)
- Career titles: 1 ITF
- Highest ranking: No. 505 (20 July 2015)

Doubles
- Career record: 0–0 (at ATP Tour level, Grand Slam level, and in Davis Cup)
- Career titles: 1 ITF
- Highest ranking: No. 723 (16 June 2014)

Henrik Sillanpää (born 24 January 1991 in Tampere) is a Finnish tennis player.

Sillanpää has a career high ATP singles ranking of No. 503 achieved on 20 July 2015 and a career high ATP doubles ranking of No. 723 achieved on 16 June 2014.

Playing for Finland in Davis Cup, Sillanpää has a win–loss record of 0–2.
