= Tristan Lamasine =

French tennis player

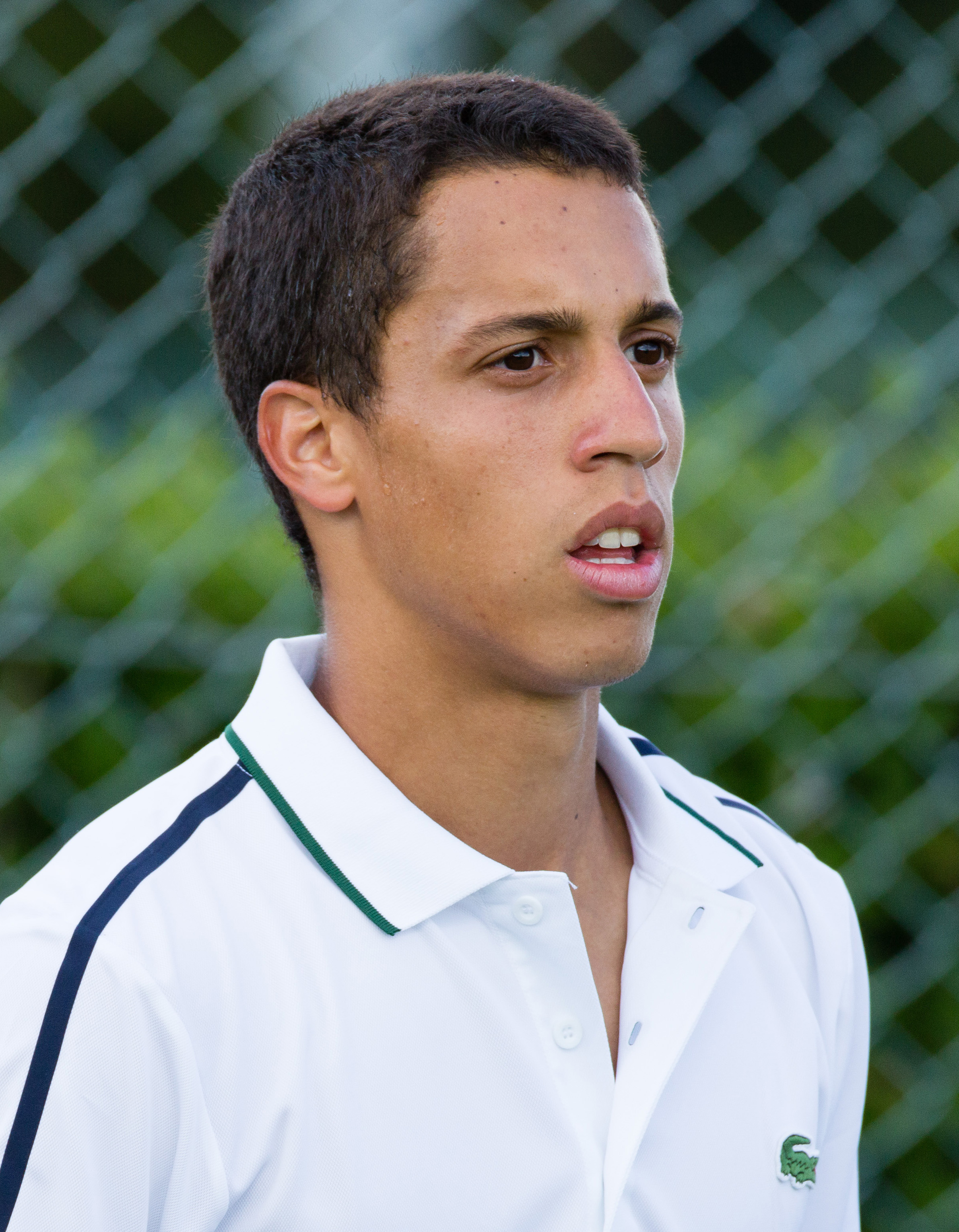
- Lamasine at the 2015 Wimbledon Qualifying
- Country (sports): France
- Residence: Choisy-le-Roi, France
- Born: 5 March 1993 (age 33) Thiais, France
- Height: 1.83 m (6 ft 0 in)
- Turned pro: 2010
- Retired: 2025
- Plays: Right-handed (two handed-backhand)
- Coach: Georges Bell
- Prize money: US $640,110

Singles
- Career record: 3–6
- Career titles: 0
- Highest ranking: No. 181 (3 August 2015)

Grand Slam singles results
- Australian Open: Q1 (2015, 2016, 2017, 2020)
- French Open: Q2 (2014, 2015, 2020)
- Wimbledon: 1R (2016)
- US Open: Q2 (2015, 2016)

Doubles
- Career record: 4–16
- Career titles: 0
- Highest ranking: No. 85 (13 June 2016)

Grand Slam doubles results
- French Open: 2R (2016, 2019)
- Wimbledon: 1R (2016)

Grand Slam mixed doubles results
- French Open: 1R (2016, 2019)

Tristan Lamasine (French pronunciation: [tʁistɑ̃ lamazin]; born 5 March 1993) is a French former professional tennis player. Lamasine has a career-high ATP singles ranking of No. 181 achieved on 3 August 2015 and a career-high ATP doubles ranking of No. 85 achieved on 13 June 2016.

== Career ==
=== 2010–15: Major debut, Maiden Challenger title ===
From 2010 to 2015, Lamasine played mostly in the ATP Challenger Tour and the ITF Men's Circuit, where he made his ITF singles debut (at a tournament in France) in September 2010 and his Challenger singles debut (at the 2011 Challenger Banque Nationale de Rimouski) in March 2011.

During the same period, on the ATP Tour, Lamasine played in singles in only four events (2011 Metz, 2014 Gstaad, 2014 Vienna and 2015 Marseille) and was eliminated in the singles qualifying rounds of all of them.

He made his ITF Men's Circuit doubles debut (at a tournament in France) in September 2010. In October 2011, he made his debut in the doubles event of an ATP Challenger Tour tournament, at the 2011 Open de Rennes.

Lamasine made his Grand Slam singles and men's doubles debut at the 2014 French Open. He was beaten in the second qualifying round of the men's singles. He and Laurent Lokoli, who had received a wildcard for the men's doubles main draw, lost in the men's doubles first round to the 4th-seeded pair of David Marrero and Fernando Verdasco.

In July 2015, Lamasine reached his first career ATP Challenger Tour singles final in Tampere. He lifted his first Challenger title, defeating André Ghem in the final 6–3, 6–2.

=== 2016–19: ATP singles debut & first wins ===
Lamasine qualified for the singles main draw of 2016 Wimbledon Championships after winning three qualifying matches. He lost in the first round of the singles main draw to 25th seed Viktor Troicki in straight sets. It was his first career singles match in the main draw of an ATP World Tour or Grand Slam tournament.

Lamasine won two singles qualifying matches to reach the singles main draw of the 2016 Swedish Open, but lost in the first round to another qualifier, Calvin Hemery, in three sets. That was his first main-draw singles match at a non-Grand Slam ATP Tour event.

Lamasine won two singles qualifying matches to reach the singles main draw of the 2016 Swiss Open. He went on to register his first career singles win in the main draw of an ATP World Tour tournament by defeating Radu Albot in straight sets in the first round. He lost his second-round match to third seed Albert Ramos-Viñolas in straight sets. At that tournament, Lamasine made his doubles debut in a non-Grand Slam ATP Tour event by partnering Paul-Henri Mathieu; the unseeded pair lost in the first round.

Starting from the first week of 2019, Lamasine played exclusively on the Challenger Tour until the Lyon Open, held in late May. At the 2019 Lyon Open, Lamasine gained entry to the singles main draw as a lucky loser when Mikhail Kukushkin withdrew due to right shoulder pain. Lamasine had lost to Jannik Sinner in the final qualifying round but defeated him in the main draw first round before losing to top seed Nikoloz Basilashvili in the second round.

=== 2024–25: Retirement ===
He received a wildcard in doubles for the 2024 ATP Lyon Open partnering Tom Paris (tennis).

Lamasine retired from professional tennis during the summer of 2025 and started coaching Hugo Gaston.

== ATP Challenger Tour and ITF career finals ==
=== Singles: 13 (5–8) ===
Legend (singles) ATP Challenger Tour (1–0) ITF Futures Tour (4–8)	Titles by surface Hard (2–6) Clay (3–2) Grass (0–0) Carpet (0–0)

Result	W–L	Date	Tournament	Tier	Surface	Opponent	Score
Loss	0–1	Oct 2013	France F18, Nevers	Futures	Hard	(France) Vincent Millot	3–6, 1–6
Loss	0–2	Oct 2013	Turkey F41, Antalya	Futures	Hard	(Czech Republic) Ivo Minář	1–6, 6–1, 3–6
Loss	0–3	Feb 2014	Portugal F3, Faro	Futures	Hard	(Spain) Andrés Artuñedo Martínavarro	4–6, 2–6
Loss	0–4	Mar 2014	France F5, Balma	Futures	Hard (i)	(France) Rudy Coco	2–6, 4–6
Win	1–4	Apr 2014	Greece F6, Heraklion	Futures	Hard	(United Kingdom) Alexander Ward	w/o
Loss	1–5	Apr 2014	France F8, Angers	Futures	Clay (i)	(France) Julien Obry	6–3, 2–6, 3–6
Win	2–5	Jul 2014	France F13, Montauban	Futures	Clay	(France) Martin Vaïsse	7–6^{(7–5)}, 1–6, 7–6^{(8–6)}
Win	3–5	Jul 2015	Tampere, Finland	Challenger	Clay	(Brazil) André Ghem	6–3, 6–2
Win	4–5	Feb 2023	M15 Grenoble, France	World Tennis Tour	Hard (i)	(France) Timo Legout	6–3, 6–4
Loss	4–6	Mar 2023	M15 Créteil, France	World Tennis Tour	Hard (i)	(Germany) Marvin Möller	2–6, 0–6
Loss	4–7	Jul 2023	M25 Bourg-en-Bresse, France	World Tennis Tour	Clay	(Monaco) Valentin Vacherot	1–6, 6–2, 5–7
Win	5–7	Jul 2023	M25 Wetzlar, Germany	World Tennis Tour	Clay	(Germany) Sebastian Fanselow	6–3, 6–1
Loss	5–8	Sep 2023	M25 Bagnères-de-Bigorre, France	World Tennis Tour	Hard	(Belgium) Michael Geerts	3–6, 6–3, 6–7^{(7–9)}

=== Doubles: 32 (19–13) ===
Legend (doubles) ATP Challenger Tour (12–7) ITF Futures Tour (7–6)	Titles by surface Hard (10–3) Clay (8–8) Grass (0–0) Carpet (1–2)

Result	W–L	Date	Tournament	Tier	Surface	Partner	Opponents	Score
Win	1–0	Mar 2013	Vietnam F1, Bạc Liêu	Futures	Hard	(France) Laurent Lokoli	(Israel) Dekel Bar (Australia) Zach Itzstein	6–4, 6–3
Win	2–0	Apr 2013	Greece F4, Heraklion	Futures	Hard	(France) Sébastien Boltz	(France) Rémi Boutillier (France) Alexis Musialek	6–3, 4–6, [10–4]
Loss	2–1	Jun 2013	Romania F3, Bacău	Futures	Clay	(Poland) Piotr Gadomski	(United States) Bradley Klahn (New Zealand) Michael Venus	6–7^{(4–7)}, 7–6^{(7–4)}, [12–14]
Loss	2–2	Feb 2014	France F3, Feucherolles	Futures	Hard (i)	(France) Laurent Lokoli	(France) Jonathan Eysseric (France) Nicolas Renavand	6–7^{(5–7)}, 4–6
Win	3–2	Apr 2014	Greece F5, Heraklion	Futures	Hard	(France) Grégoire Barrère	(Czech Republic) Marek Jaloviec (Czech Republic) Václav Šafránek	7–6^{(7–4)}, 6–2
Win	4–2	Jun 2014	Blois, France	Challenger	Clay	(France) Laurent Lokoli	(Argentina) Guillermo Durán (Argentina) Máximo González	7–5, 6–0
Win	5–2	Jul 2015	France F12, Montauban	Futures	Clay	(France) Maxime Teixeira	(France) Yanais Laurent (France) Constant Lestienne	6–4, 6–4
Win	6–2	Jul 2015	Tampere, Finland	Challenger	Clay	(Brazil) André Ghem	(Finland) Harri Heliövaara (Finland) Patrik Niklas-Salminen	7–6^{(7–5)}, 7–6^{(7–4)}
Win	7–2	Sep 2015	Szczecin, Poland	Challenger	Clay	(France) Fabrice Martin	(Italy) Federico Gaio (Italy) Alessandro Giannessi	6–3, 7–6^{(7–4)}
Win	8–2	Oct 2015	Orléans, France	Challenger	Hard (i)	(France) Fabrice Martin	(United Kingdom) Ken Skupski (United Kingdom) Neal Skupski	6–4, 7–6^{(7–2)}
Win	9–2	Oct 2015	Ho Chi Minh City, Vietnam	Challenger	Hard	(Germany) Nils Langer	(India) Saketh Myneni (India) Sanam Singh	1–6, 6–3, [10–8]
Loss	9–3	Jan 2016	Nouméa, New Caledonia	Challenger	Hard	(France) Grégoire Barrère	(France) Julien Benneteau (France) Édouard Roger-Vasselin	6–7^{(4–7)}, 6–3, [5–10]
Win	10–3	Mar 2016	Quimper, France	Challenger	Hard (i)	(France) Albano Olivetti	(Croatia) Nikola Mektić (Croatia) Antonio Šančić	6–2, 4–6, [10–7]
Win	11–3	Jun 2016	Lyon, France	Challenger	Clay	(France) Grégoire Barrère	(France) Jonathan Eysseric (Croatia) Franko Škugor	2–6, 6–3, [10–6]
Win	12–3	Aug 2016	Gatineau, Canada	Challenger	Hard	(Croatia) Franko Škugor	(Australia) Jarryd Chaplin (Australia) John-Patrick Smith	6–3, 6–1
Loss	12–4	Sep 2016	Sibiu, Romania	Challenger	Clay	(France) Jonathan Eysseric	(Netherlands) Robin Haase (Germany) Tim Pütz	4–6, 2–6
Win	13–4	Jan 2017	Nouméa, New Caledonia	Challenger	Hard	(France) Quentin Halys	(Spain) Adrián Menéndez Maceiras (Italy) Stefano Napolitano	7–6^{(11–9)}, 6–1
Win	14–4	Apr 2017	Sophia Antipolis, France	Challenger	Clay	(Croatia) Franko Škugor	(Belarus) Uladzimir Ignatik (Slovakia) Jozef Kovalík	6–2, 6–2
Loss	14–5	Oct 2017	Orléans, France	Challenger	Hard (i)	(France) Jonathan Eysseric	(Argentina) Guillermo Durán (Argentina) Andrés Molteni	3–6, 7–6^{(7–4)}, [11–13]
Win	15–5	Apr 2018	Portugal F7, Porto	Futures	Clay	(Belgium) Germain Gigounon	(Portugal) Francisco Cabral (Portugal) Tiago Cação	5–7, 6–3, [11–9]
Loss	15–6	Apr 2018	Portugal F8, Cascais	Futures	Clay	(Belgium) Germain Gigounon	(Belgium) Niels Desein (Netherlands) Boy Westerhof	6–7^{(4–7)}, 2–6
Loss	15–7	Apr 2019	Sophia Antipolis, France	Challenger	Clay	(France) Enzo Couacaud	(Netherlands) Thiemo de Bakker (Netherlands) Robin Haase	4–6, 4–6
Win	16–7	Oct 2019	Ismaning, Germany	Challenger	Carpet (i)	(France) Quentin Halys	(United States) James Cerretani (United States) Maxime Cressy	6–3, 7-5
Loss	16–8	Aug 2020	Trieste, Italy	Challenger	Clay	(France) Hugo Gaston	(Uruguay) Ariel Behar (Kazakhstan) Andrey Golubev	4–6, 2–6
Win	17–8	Mar 2021	Biella, Italy	Challenger	Hard (i)	(France) Quentin Halys	(Ukraine) Denys Molchanov (Ukraine) Sergiy Stakhovsky	6–1, 2-0 ret.
Loss	17–9	June 2021	Lyon, France	Challenger	Clay	(France) Albano Olivetti	(Uruguay) Martín Cuevas (Uruguay) Pablo Cuevas	3–6, 6-7^{(2-7)}
Loss	17–10	April 2022	Prague, Czech Republic	Challenger	Clay	(France) Lucas Pouille	(Portugal) Francisco Cabral (Poland) Szymon Walków	2-6, 6-7^{(12-14)}
Win	18–10	Aug 2022	M25 Wetzlar, Germany	World Tennis Tour	Clay	(Lebanon) Benjamin Hassan	(Germany) Constantin Frantzen (Germany) Tim Sandkaulen	6–4, 6–3
Loss	18–11	Jan 2023	M25 Veigy-Foncenex, France	World Tennis Tour	Carpet	(France) Matteo Martineau	(Croatia) Zvonimir Babić (Germany) Niklas Schell	4–6, 7–6^{(7–5)}, [8–10]
Win	19–11	Jan 2023	M15 Bressuire, France	World Tennis Tour	Hard	(France) Grégoire Jacq	(Switzerland) Luca Castelnuovo (Switzerland) Yannik Steinegger	6–4, 7–5
Loss	19–12	Jan 2023	M25 Nußloch, Germany	World Tennis Tour	Carpet	(France) Matteo Martineau	(Germany) Peter Heller (Germany) Johannes Härteis	6–3, 5–7, [6–10]
Loss	19–13	May 2023	M25 Valldoreix, Spain	World Tennis Tour	Clay	(France) Calvin Hemery	(Spain) Javier Barranco Cosano (Spain) Benjamín Winter López	4–6, 2–6

== Performance timelines ==
Key
W	F	SF	QF	#R	RR	Q#	P#	DNQ	A	Z#	PO	G	S	B	NMS	NTI	P	NH

(W) winner; (F) finalist; (SF) semifinalist; (QF) quarterfinalist; (#R) rounds 4, 3, 2, 1; (RR) round-robin stage; (Q#) qualification round; (P#) preliminary round; (DNQ) did not qualify; (A) absent; (Z#) Davis/Fed Cup Zonal Group (with number indication) or (PO) play-off; (G) gold, (S) silver or (B) bronze Olympic/Paralympic medal; (NMS) not a Masters tournament; (NTI) not a Tier I tournament; (P) postponed; (NH) not held; (SR) strike rate (events won / competed); (W–L) win–loss record.
To avoid confusion and double counting, these charts are updated at the conclusion of a tournament or when the player's participation has ended.

=== Singles ===
Current through the 2023 Wimbledon.

Tournament	2010	2011	2012	2013	2014	2015	2016	2017	2018	2019	2020	2021	2022	2023	W–L
Grand Slam tournaments
Australian Open	A	A	A	A	A	Q1	Q1	Q1	A	A	Q1	A	A	A	0–0
French Open	A	A	A	A	Q2	Q2	Q1	Q1	A	A	Q2	Q1	A	A	0–0
Wimbledon	A	A	A	A	A	Q2	1R	Q1	A	A	NH	A	A	A	0–1
US Open	A	A	A	A	A	Q2	Q2	A	A	A	A	A	A		0–0
Win–loss	0–0	0–0	0–0	0–0	0–0	0–0	0–1	0–0	0–0	0–0	0–0	0–0	0–0	0–0	0–1

=== Doubles ===
Current through the 2023 Wimbledon.

Tournament	2010	2011	2012	2013	2014	2015	2016	2017	2018	2019	2020	2021	2022	2023	W–L
Grand Slam tournaments
Australian Open	A	A	A	A	A	A	A	A	A	A	A	A	A	A	0–0
French Open	A	A	A	A	1R	1R	2R	1R	A	2R	A	A	A	A	2–5
Wimbledon	A	A	A	A	A	A	1R	A	A	A	NH	A	A	A	0–1
US Open	A	A	A	A	A	A	A	A	A	A	A	A	A		0–0
Win–loss	0–0	0–0	0–0	0–0	0–1	0–1	1–2	0–1	0–0	1–1	0–0	0–0	0–0	0–0	2–6
