= 2012 Tampere Open – Doubles =

Doubles
- 2012 Tampere Open

Final
- Champions: (Austria) Michael Linzer (Austria) Gerald Melzer
- Runners-up: (Belgium) Niels Desein (Brazil) André Ghem
- Score: 6–1, 7–6^{(7–3)}

Events
Singles	Doubles
← 2011 ·	Tampere Open	· 2013 →

Jonathan Dasnières de Veigy and David Guez were the defending champions but decided not to participate.
Michael Linzer and Gerald Melzer won the title, defeating Niels Desein and André Ghem 6–1, 7–6^{(7–3)} in the final.

== Seeds ==
1. (Finland) Harri Heliövaara / (Germany) Simon Stadler (first round)
2. (Latvia) Andis Juška / (Latvia) Deniss Pavlovs (first round)
3. (Finland) Timo Nieminen / (France) Stéphane Robert (semifinals)
4. (Spain) Gerard Granollers / (Spain) Guillermo Olaso (first round)

== Draw ==
=== Key ===
- Q = Qualifier
- WC = Wild card
- LL = Lucky loser
- Alt = Alternate
- SE = Special exempt
- PR = Protected ranking
- ITF = ITF entry
- JE = Junior exempt
- w/o = Walkover
- r = Retired
- d = Defaulted
- SR = Special ranking

=== Draw ===
First round
1	(Finland) H Heliövaara (Germany) S Stadler	4	4
(Austria) M Linzer (Austria) G Melzer	6	6
WC	(Germany) Michael Schmidtmann (Germany) Jan Stremmel	3	2
(Switzerland) H Laaksonen (Romania) P-A Luncanu	6	6
3	(Finland) T Nieminen (France) S Robert	4	6	[10]
WC	(France) É Prodon (Finland) Henrik Sillanpää	6	3	[5]
(Sweden) P Rosenholm (Sweden) M Ryderstedt	7^{7}	3	[10]
(Spain) Jordi Samper-Montaña (United States) D Zivkovic	6^{2}	6	[8]
WC	(Finland) Sami Huurinainen (Finland) Jesper Saarni	5	5
(Poland) M Gawron (Poland) G Panfil	7	7
(Belgium) N Desein (Brazil) A Ghem	7^{7}	6^{1}	[11]
4	(Spain) G Granollers (Spain) G Olaso	6^{3}	7^{7}	[9]
(Sweden) Jesper Brunström (Sweden) P Brydolf	2	3
(Portugal) G Elias (Portugal) J Sousa	6	6
(Slovakia) A Martin (Chile) H Podlipnik	2	7	[12]
2	(Latvia) A Juška (Latvia) D Pavlovs	6	5	[10]

Quarterfinals
(Austria) M Linzer (Austria) G Melzer	2	7^{7}	[10]
(Switzerland) H Laaksonen (Romania) P-A Luncanu	6	6^{3}	[8]
3	(Finland) T Nieminen (France) S Robert	6	6
(Sweden) P Rosenholm (Sweden) M Ryderstedt	0	1
(Poland) M Gawron (Poland) G Panfil	6	3	[5]
(Belgium) N Desein (Brazil) A Ghem	3	6	[10]
(Portugal) G Elias (Portugal) J Sousa	3	6	[12]
(Slovakia) A Martin (Chile) H Podlipnik	6	2	[10]

Semifinals
(Austria) M Linzer (Austria) G Melzer	6	4	[10]
3	(Finland) T Nieminen (France) S Robert	1	6	[6]
(Belgium) N Desein (Brazil) A Ghem	7^{7}	6
(Portugal) G Elias (Portugal) J Sousa	6^{4}	4

Final
(Austria) M Linzer (Austria) G Melzer	6	7^{7}
(Belgium) N Desein (Brazil) A Ghem	1	6^{3}
