= 2011 BNP Paribas Polish Open – Singles =

Singles
- 2011 BNP Paribas Polish Open

Final
- Champion: (France) Éric Prodon
- Runner-up: (Serbia) Nikola Ćirić
- Score: 6–1, 6–3

Events
Singles	Doubles
← 2010 ·	BNP Paribas Polish Open	· 2012 →

Éric Prodon the first edition of the tournament, defeating Nikola Ćirić 6–1, 6–3 in the final.

== Seeds ==
1. (Czech Republic) Lukáš Rosol (first round)
2. (Italy) Flavio Cipolla (second round)
3. (France) Stéphane Robert (quarterfinals)
4. (France) Éric Prodon (champion)
5. (Belgium) Steve Darcis (quarterfinals)
6. (France) Marc Gicquel (semifinals)
7. (Italy) Simone Bolelli (second round)
8. (Netherlands) Jesse Huta Galung (second round)

== Draw ==
=== Key ===
- Q = Qualifier
- WC = Wild card
- LL = Lucky loser
- Alt = Alternate
- SE = Special exempt
- PR = Protected ranking
- ITF = ITF entry
- JE = Junior exempt
- w/o = Walkover
- r = Retired
- d = Defaulted
- SR = Special ranking

=== Finals ===
Semifinals
SE	(Serbia) Nikola Ćirić	6	7^{7}
6	(France) Marc Gicquel	4	6^{5}
4	(France) Éric Prodon	4	7^{7}	7^{7}
(Czech Republic) Jan Hájek	6	6^{3}	6^{2}

Final
SE	(Serbia) Nikola Ćirić	1	3
4	(France) Éric Prodon	6	6

=== Top half ===
First round
1	(Czech Republic) L Rosol	6^{5}	7	6^{1}
SE	(Serbia) N Ćirić	7^{7}	5	7^{7}
Q	(Czech Republic) Michal Konečný	6^{3}	2
(Italy) A di Mauro	7^{7}	6
(Germany) A Beck	6	6
WC	(Poland) A Kapaś	2	3
WC	(Poland) Piotr Gadomski	6	4	4
8	(Netherlands) J Huta Galung	1	6	6
3	(France) S Robert	6	6
Q	(Poland) Robert Godlewski	2	0
Q	(Poland) D Celt	2	4
SE	(Spain) I Navarro	6	6
(Spain) R Bautista-Agut	4	4
(Spain) D Muñoz-De La Nava	6	6
WC	(Poland) G Panfil	6	4	6^{6}
6	(France) M Gicquel	2	6	7^{8}

Second round
SE	(Serbia) N Ćirić	6	4	6
(Italy) A di Mauro	3	6	4
(Germany) A Beck	6	6
8	(Netherlands) J Huta Galung	4	0
3	(France) S Robert	3	7^{7}	6
SE	(Spain) I Navarro	6	6^{2}	4
(Spain) D Muñoz-De La Nava	2	6	4
6	(France) M Gicquel	6	3	6

Quarterfinals
SE	(Serbia) N Ćirić	3	6	6
(Germany) A Beck	6	3	2
3	(France) S Robert	6	6^{6}	6^{4}
6	(France) M Gicquel	4	7^{8}	7^{7}

Semifinals
SE	(Serbia) N Ćirić	6	7^{7}
6	(France) M Gicquel	4	6^{5}

=== Bottom half ===
First round
7	(Italy) S Bolelli	6	6
Q	(Poland) Maciej Smoła	1	1
(Czech Republic) I Minář	2	3
(France) F Serra	6	6
(Romania) A Ungur	2	6	7
(Italy) S Vagnozzi	6	4	5
(Turkey) M İlhan	3	3
4	(France) É Prodon	6	6
5	(Belgium) S Darcis	6	6
(Kazakhstan) Y Schukin	3	2
WC	(Poland) M Gawron	7^{7}	6
(Poland) J Janowicz	6^{2}	4
(Czech Republic) J Hájek	6	6
(Argentina) JP Brzezicki	1	0
(Poland) M Przysiężny	6^{4}	5
2	(Italy) F Cipolla	7^{7}	7

Second round
7	(Italy) S Bolelli	3	4
(France) F Serra	6	6
(Romania) A Ungur	3	4
4	(France) É Prodon	6	6
5	(Belgium) S Darcis	6	6
WC	(Poland) M Gawron	3	1
(Czech Republic) J Hájek	6	6
2	(Italy) F Cipolla	3	2

Quarterfinals
(France) F Serra	6	1	2
4	(France) É Prodon	2	6	6
5	(Belgium) S Darcis	6^{4}	3
(Czech Republic) J Hájek	7^{7}	6

Semifinals
4	(France) É Prodon	4	7^{7}	7^{7}
(Czech Republic) J Hájek	6	6^{3}	6^{2}
