= 2012 Tampere Open – Singles =

Singles
- 2012 Tampere Open

Final
- Champion: (Portugal) João Sousa
- Runner-up: (France) Éric Prodon
- Score: 7–6^{(7–5)}, 6–4

Events
Singles	Doubles
← 2011 ·	Tampere Open	· 2013 →

Éric Prodon is the defending champion.
João Sousa won the title, defeating Prodon 7–6^{(7–5)}, 6–4 in the final.

== Seeds ==
1. (Portugal) João Sousa (champion)
2. (Portugal) Gastão Elias (semifinals)
3. (France) Éric Prodon (final)
4. (France) Jonathan Dasnières de Veigy (quarterfinals)
5. (Austria) Michael Linzer (second round, retired due to stomach virus)
6. (Switzerland) Michael Lammer (second round)
7. (Finland) Harri Heliövaara (second round)
8. (Netherlands) Boy Westerhof (quarterfinals)

== Draw ==
=== Key ===
- Q = Qualifier
- WC = Wild card
- LL = Lucky loser
- Alt = Alternate
- SE = Special exempt
- PR = Protected ranking
- ITF = ITF entry
- JE = Junior exempt
- w/o = Walkover
- r = Retired
- d = Defaulted
- SR = Special ranking

=== Finals ===
Semifinals
1	(Portugal) João Sousa	7^{7}	6
WC	(Switzerland) Henri Laaksonen	6^{5}	1
3	(France) Éric Prodon	6	6
2	(Portugal) Gastão Elias	2	2

Final
1	(Portugal) João Sousa	7^{7}	6
3	(France) Éric Prodon	6^{5}	4

=== Top half ===
First round
1	(Portugal) J Sousa	6	6
(United States) D Zivkovic	3	0
WC	(Finland) Max Wennakoski	5	4
WC	(Finland) M Kontinen	7	6
(Chile) H Podlipnik	6	6
(Spain) Jordi Samper-Montaña	3	1
Q	(Belgium) Alexandre Folie	4	4
8	(Netherlands) B Westerhof	6	6
4	(France) J Dasnières de Veigy	6	6
(Australia) Jason Kubler	4	1
(Slovakia) A Martin	3	7^{7}	6
(Poland) M Gawron	6	6^{0}	4
(Finland) T Nieminen	6^{4}	4
WC	(Switzerland) H Laaksonen	7^{7}	6
(Italy) D Giorgini	0	4
7	(Finland) H Heliövaara	6	6

Second round
1	(Portugal) J Sousa	7^{7}	6
WC	(Finland) M Kontinen	6^{3}	1
(Chile) H Podlipnik	3	4
8	(Netherlands) B Westerhof	6	6
4	(France) J Dasnières de Veigy	6	6
(Slovakia) A Martin	3	0
WC	(Switzerland) H Laaksonen	6	6
7	(Finland) H Heliövaara	4	4

Quarterfinals
1	(Portugal) J Sousa	6	6
8	(Netherlands) B Westerhof	3	3
4	(France) J Dasnières de Veigy	6^{4}	7	4
WC	(Switzerland) H Laaksonen	7^{7}	5	6

Semifinals
1	(Portugal) J Sousa	7^{7}	6
WC	(Switzerland) H Laaksonen	6^{5}	1

=== Bottom half ===
First round
5	(Austria) M Linzer	6	6
WC	(Finland) Henrik Sillanpää	0	0
(Spain) G Granollers	2	5
Q	(Sweden) P Rosenholm	6	7
(France) S Robert	3	6^{3}
(Sweden) M Ryderstedt	6	7^{7}
(Austria) G Melzer	2	5
3	(France) É Prodon	6	7
6	(Switzerland) M Lammer	7	7^{7}
(France) Axel Michon	5	6^{5}
Q	(Romania) P-A Luncanu	6	4	3
LL	(Belgium) N Desein	1	6	6
(Brazil) A Ghem	6	3	4
Q	(Belgium) Y Reuter	1	6	6
(Spain) G Olaso	3	7^{10}	1
2	(Portugal) G Elias	6	6^{8}	6

Second round
5	(Austria) M Linzer	7	4	r
Q	(Sweden) P Rosenholm	5	6
(Sweden) M Ryderstedt	3	4
3	(France) É Prodon	6	6
6	(Switzerland) M Lammer	6^{4}	1
LL	(Belgium) N Desein	7^{7}	6
Q	(Belgium) Y Reuter	6	4	3
2	(Portugal) G Elias	4	6	6

Quarterfinals
Q	(Sweden) P Rosenholm	2	1
3	(France) É Prodon	6	6
LL	(Belgium) N Desein	4	2
2	(Portugal) G Elias	6	6

Semifinals
3	(France) É Prodon	6	6
2	(Portugal) G Elias	2	2
