= 2011 Tampere Open – Singles =

Singles
- 2011 Tampere Open

Final
- Champion: (France) Éric Prodon
- Runner-up: (France) Augustin Gensse
- Score: 6–1, 3–6, 6–2

Events
Singles	Doubles
← 2010 ·	Tampere Open	· 2012 →

Éric Prodon successfully defended his title. He defeated Alexander Flock, João Sousa, Timo Nieminen, Jonathan Dasnières de Veigy and Augustin Gensse to win this tournament.

== Seeds ==
1. (France) Éric Prodon (champion)
2. (France) Benoît Paire (second round)
3. (France) Florent Serra (first round)
4. (France) David Guez (quarterfinals)
5. (France) Augustin Gensse (final)
6. (Slovakia) Andrej Martin (first round)
7. (Estonia) Jürgen Zopp (second round)
8. (Germany) Bastian Knittel (first round)

== Draw ==
=== Key ===
- Q = Qualifier
- WC = Wild card
- LL = Lucky loser
- Alt = Alternate
- SE = Special exempt
- PR = Protected ranking
- ITF = ITF entry
- JE = Junior exempt
- w/o = Walkover
- r = Retired
- d = Defaulted
- SR = Special ranking

=== Finals ===
Semifinals
1	(France) Éric Prodon	6	3	6
(France) Jonathan Dasnières de Veigy	4	6	3
WC	(Finland) Henri Kontinen	7	4	3
5	(France) Augustin Gensse	5	6	6

Final
1	(France) Éric Prodon	6	3	6
5	(France) Augustin Gensse	1	6	2

=== Top half ===
First round
1	(France) É Prodon	6	6
(Germany) Alexander Flock	4	4
(Portugal) J Sousa	7^{8}	4	6
(France) R Jouan	6^{6}	6	4
Q	(Sweden) D Berta	6^{3}	4
(Finland) T Nieminen	7^{7}	6
(France) Laurent Rochette	3	4
7	(Estonia) J Zopp	6	6
3	(France) F Serra	7^{7}	3	4
(France) J Dasnières de Veigy	6^{1}	6	6
(Finland) H Heliövaara	4	6	7^{7}
(Italy) Andrea Arnaboldi	6	3	6^{4}
(France) J Eysseric	6^{5}	6	6
(Italy) A Brizzi	7^{7}	4	4
(Hungary) Á Kellner	6	6
8	(Germany) B Knittel	3	4

Second round
1	(France) É Prodon	5	6	7^{7}
(Portugal) J Sousa	7	1	6^{3}
(Finland) T Nieminen	6	6
7	(Estonia) J Zopp	1	2
(France) J Dasnières de Veigy	6	6
(Finland) H Heliövaara	0	3
(France) J Eysseric	7^{7}	7^{7}
(Hungary) Á Kellner	6^{4}	6^{5}

Quarterfinals
1	(France) É Prodon	6	6
(Finland) T Nieminen	2	1
(France) J Dasnières de Veigy	6	7
(France) J Eysseric	4	6

Semifinals
1	(France) É Prodon	6	3	6
(France) J Dasnières de Veigy	4	6	3

=== Bottom half ===
First round
6	(Slovakia) A Martin	3	4
(Slovakia) I Klec	6	6
WC	(Finland) Sami Huurinainen	2	2
WC	(Finland) H Kontinen	6	6
(Portugal) L Tavares	4	6	6^{6}
WC	(Finland) M Kontinen	6	3	7^{8}
Q	(France) P-H Herbert	2	6^{1}
4	(France) D Guez	6	7^{7}
5	(France) A Gensse	6	6
WC	(Finland) Henrik Sillanpää	4	2
LL	(Sweden) Robin Olin	6	6
Q	(Portugal) Gonçalo Pereira	2	3
(Czech Republic) D Lojda	4	6	6
Q	(France) N Renavand	6	3	4
(Italy) M Viola	2	1
2	(France) B Paire	6	6

Second round
(Slovakia) I Klec	6^{1}	4
WC	(Finland) H Kontinen	7^{7}	6
WC	(Finland) M Kontinen	3	3
4	(France) D Guez	6	6
5	(France) A Gensse	4	6	6
LL	(Sweden) Robin Olin	6	1	4
(Czech Republic) D Lojda	6	6
2	(France) B Paire	1	1

Quarterfinals
WC	(Finland) H Kontinen	6	6
4	(France) D Guez	4	4
5	(France) A Gensse	7^{7}	7^{7}
(Czech Republic) D Lojda	6^{1}	6^{1}

Semifinals
WC	(Finland) H Kontinen	7	4	3
5	(France) A Gensse	5	6	6
