= 2013 Tampere Open – Women's doubles =

Women's doubles
- 2013 Tampere Open

Final
- Champions: (Germany) Julia Wachaczyk (Germany) Nina Zander
- Runners-up: (Finland) Emma Laine (Finland) Piia Suomalainen
- Score: 6–4, 6–4

Events
Singles	men	women
Doubles	men	women
← 2012 ·	Tampere Open	· 2014 →

Olga Brózda and Anouk Tigu were the defending champions, having won the event in 2012, but both players chose not to defend their title.

Julia Wachaczyk and Nina Zander won the title, defeating Emma Laine and Piia Suomalainen in the final, 6–4, 6–4.

== Seeds ==
1. (Russia) Alena Tarasova / (Hungary) Naomi Totka (first round)
2. (Italy) Francesca Palmigiano / (Italy) Valeria Prosperi (first round)
3. (Sweden) Beatrice Cedermark / (Sweden) Malin Ulvefeldt (quarterfinals)
4. (Denmark) Karen Barbat / (France) Amandine Cazeaux (semifinals)

== Draw ==
=== Key ===
- Q = Qualifier
- WC = Wild card
- LL = Lucky loser
- Alt = Alternate
- SE = Special exempt
- PR = Protected ranking
- ITF = ITF entry
- JE = Junior exempt
- w/o = Walkover
- r = Retired
- d = Defaulted
- SR = Special ranking

First round
1	(Russia) A Tarasova (Hungary) N Totka	5	0
(Sweden) D Bashota (Russia) K Sharifova	7	6
(Russia) T Bizhukova (Russia) J Valetova	6	6^{6}	[10]
(Russia) I Karamalak (Russia) A Koval	1	7^{8}	[2]
3	(Sweden) B Cedermark (Sweden) M Ulvefeldt	6	6
(Finland) E Leivo (Finland) T Tuomi	4	0
WC	(Finland) S Saarteinen (Finland) H Salonen	4	4
(Germany) J Wachaczyk (Germany) N Zander	6	6
(Sweden) E Granström (Sweden) P Wulcan	6	6
WC	(Finland) M-E Pasanen (Finland) A Sillanpää	4	2
(Russia) D Afanasyeva (Russia) L Vasilyeva	3	6	[5]
4	(Denmark) K Barbat (France) A Cazeaux	6	1	[10]
WC	(Finland) C Estlander (Finland) J Hyöty	6	1	[8]
(Poland) P Czarnik (Ukraine) O Piskun	4	6	[10]
(Finland) E Laine (Finland) P Suomalainen	6	6
2	(Italy) F Palmigiano (Italy) V Prosperi	4	4

Quarterfinals
(Sweden) D Bashota (Russia) K Sharifova	3
(Russia) T Bizhukova (Russia) J Valetova	0^{r}
3	(Sweden) B Cedermark (Sweden) M Ulvefeldt	0	2
(Germany) J Wachaczyk (Germany) N Zander	6	6
(Sweden) E Granström (Sweden) P Wulcan	3	3
4	(Denmark) K Barbat (France) A Cazeaux	6	6
(Poland) P Czarnik (Ukraine) O Piskun	2	2
(Finland) E Laine (Finland) P Suomalainen	6	6

Semifinals
(Sweden) D Bashota (Russia) K Sharifova	6	2	[6]
(Germany) J Wachaczyk (Germany) N Zander	3	6	[10]
4	(Denmark) K Barbat (France) A Cazeaux	4	2
(Finland) E Laine (Finland) P Suomalainen	6	6

Final
(Germany) J Wachaczyk (Germany) N Zander	6	6
(Finland) E Laine (Finland) P Suomalainen	4	4
