= 2011 BNP Paribas Polish Open – Doubles =

Doubles
- 2011 BNP Paribas Polish Open

Final
- Champions: (Poland) Mariusz Fyrstenberg (Poland) Marcin Matkowski
- Runners-up: (France) Olivier Charroin (France) Stéphane Robert
- Score: 7–5, 7–6^{(7–4)}

Events
Singles	Doubles
← 2010 ·	BNP Paribas Polish Open	· 2012 →

Mariusz Fyrstenberg and Marcin Matkowski won the tournament. They defeated Olivier Charroin and Stéphane Robert in the final, 7–5, 7–6^{(7–4)}.

== Seeds ==
1. (Poland) Mariusz Fyrstenberg / (Poland) Marcin Matkowski (champions)
2. (Italy) Flavio Cipolla / (Italy) Simone Vagnozzi (quarterfinals)
3. (Poland) Tomasz Bednarek / (Poland) Mateusz Kowalczyk (first round)
4. (France) Olivier Charroin / (France) Stéphane Robert (finals)

== Draw ==
=== Key ===
- Q = Qualifier
- WC = Wild card
- LL = Lucky loser
- Alt = Alternate
- SE = Special exempt
- PR = Protected ranking
- ITF = ITF entry
- JE = Junior exempt
- w/o = Walkover
- r = Retired
- d = Defaulted
- SR = Special ranking

=== Draw ===
First round
1	(Poland) M Fyrstenberg (Poland) M Matkowski	6	6
Alt	(Poland) Mateusz Szmigiel (Poland) Mikołaj Szmyrgała	2	1
(Poland) J Janowicz (Poland) M Przysiężny	7^{7}	4	[8]
(Australia) R Junaid (Australia) S Kadir	6^{4}	6	[10]
3	(Poland) T Bednarek (Poland) M Kowalczyk	6^{6}	4
(Czech Republic) J Hájek (Czech Republic) I Minář	7^{7}	6
(Australia) C Ebelthite (Germany) A Satschko	7^{8}	6
(Spain) I Navarro (Czech Republic) L Rosol	6^{6}	2
WC	(Poland) Dawid Celt (Poland) Robert Godlewski	3	3
(Italy) A di Mauro (Romania) A Ungur	6	6
(France) M Gicquel (France) É Prodon	6	6^{1}	[10]
4	(France) O Charroin (France) S Robert	4	7^{7}	[12]
WC	(Poland) Piotr Gadomski (Poland) Maciej Smoła	6	6
WC	(Poland) A Kapaś (Poland) G Panfil	3	3
(South Africa) J Coetzee (Netherlands) J Huta Galung	4	6	[12]
2	(Italy) F Cipolla (Italy) S Vagnozzi	6	4	[14]

Quarterfinals
1	(Poland) M Fyrstenberg (Poland) M Matkowski	6	6
(Australia) R Junaid (Australia) S Kadir	1	3
(Czech Republic) J Hájek (Czech Republic) I Minář	4	6	[10]
(Australia) C Ebelthite (Germany) A Satschko	6	3	[7]
(Italy) A di Mauro (Romania) A Ungur	4	1
4	(France) O Charroin (France) S Robert	6	6
WC	(Poland) Piotr Gadomski (Poland) Maciej Smoła	6	4	[10]
2	(Italy) F Cipolla (Italy) S Vagnozzi	3	6	[4]

Semifinals
1	(Poland) M Fyrstenberg (Poland) M Matkowski
(Czech Republic) J Hájek (Czech Republic) I Minář	w/o
4	(France) O Charroin (France) S Robert	6	6
WC	(Poland) Piotr Gadomski (Poland) Maciej Smoła	2	4

Final
1	(Poland) M Fyrstenberg (Poland) M Matkowski	7	7^{7}
4	(France) O Charroin (France) S Robert	5	6^{4}
