= 2010 Tampere Open – Doubles =

Doubles
- 2010 Tampere Open

Final
- Champions: (Portugal) João Sousa (Portugal) Leonardo Tavares
- Runners-up: (Latvia) Andis Juška (Latvia) Deniss Pavlovs
- Score: 7–6(3), 7–5

Events
Singles	Doubles
← 2009 ·	Tampere Open	· 2011 →

Peter Luczak and Yuri Schukin were the defending champions, but they didn't participate.
João Sousa and Leonardo Tavares won the doubles title, defeating Andis Juška and Deniss Pavlovs 7–6(3), 7–5 in the final.

== Seeds ==
1. (Latvia) Andis Juška / (Latvia) Deniss Pavlovs (final)
2. (Portugal) João Sousa / (Portugal) Leonardo Tavares (champions)
3. (Argentina) Sebastián Decoud / (Netherlands) Jesse Huta Galung (quarterfinals)
4. (Finland) Harri Heliövaara / (Finland) Juho Paukku (quarterfinals)

== Draw ==
=== Key ===
- Q = Qualifier
- WC = Wild card
- LL = Lucky loser
- Alt = Alternate
- SE = Special exempt
- PR = Protected ranking
- ITF = ITF entry
- JE = Junior exempt
- w/o = Walkover
- r = Retired
- d = Defaulted
- SR = Special ranking

=== Draw ===
First round
1	(Latvia) A Juška (Latvia) D Pavlovs	6	6
WC	(Finland) M Kingas (Finland) H Piiroinen	1	2
(Finland) S Huurinainen (Finland) J Saarni	6	4	[6]
WC	(Finland) T Manner (Finland) R Niklas-Salminen	0	6	[10]
4	(Finland) H Heliövaara (Finland) J Paukku	6	7
(Sweden) M Sekulic (Germany) P Taubert	4	6^{5}
(France) É Prodon (Finland) H Sillanpää	2	6^{5}
(Brazil) A Ghem (Portugal) G Pereira	6	7
(Finland) T Nieminen (Estonia) J Zopp	1	6	[10]
WC	(Finland) I Orre (Finland) M Wennakoski	6	2	[7]
(Sweden) M Eriksson (Sweden) P Rosenholm	1	4
3	(Argentina) S Decoud (Netherlands) J Huta Galung	6	6
(Italy) A Brizzi (Italy) D Giorgini	3	1
(Australia) R Junaid (Greece) N Karagiannis	6	6
(Sweden) E Eleskovic (Finland) M Kontinen	0	6	[8]
2	(Portugal) J Sousa (Portugal) L Tavares	6	3	[10]

Quarterfinals
1	(Latvia) A Juška (Latvia) D Pavlovs	6	6
WC	(Finland) T Manner (Finland) R Niklas-Salminen	3	3
4	(Finland) H Heliövaara (Finland) J Paukku	4	6	[8]
(Brazil) A Ghem (Portugal) G Pereira	6	4	[10]
(Finland) T Nieminen (Estonia) J Zopp	6	6
3	(Argentina) S Decoud (Netherlands) J Huta Galung	3	3
(Australia) R Junaid (Greece) N Karagiannis	6	3	[4]
2	(Portugal) J Sousa (Portugal) L Tavares	3	6	[10]

Semifinals
1	(Latvia) A Juška (Latvia) D Pavlovs	3	6	[10]
(Brazil) A Ghem (Portugal) G Pereira	6	3	[7]
(Finland) T Nieminen (Estonia) J Zopp	0	2
2	(Portugal) J Sousa (Portugal) L Tavares	6	6

Finals
1	(Latvia) A Juška (Latvia) D Pavlovs	6^{3}	5
2	(Portugal) J Sousa (Portugal) L Tavares	7	7
