= 2009 Tampere Open – Singles =

Singles
- 2009 Tampere Open

Final
- Champion: (Netherlands) Thiemo de Bakker
- Runner-up: (Australia) Peter Luczak
- Score: 6–4, 7–6(7)

Events
Singles	Doubles
← 2008 ·	Tampere Open	· 2010 →

Mathieu Montcourt cannot defend his title. He died on 6 July 2009.
Thiemo de Bakker became the new champion, after defeating Peter Luczak 6–4, 7–6(7) in the final.

== Seeds ==
1. (Germany) Björn Phau (first round)
2. (Australia) Peter Luczak (final)
3. (Germany) Florian Mayer (semifinals)
4. (France) Stéphane Robert (first round)
5. (Germany) Julian Reister (first round)
6. (Austria) Andreas Haider-Maurer (quarterfinals, retired due to left foot injury)
7. (Kazakhstan) Yuri Schukin (quarterfinals)
8. (Slovakia) Kamil Čapkovič (first round)

== Draw ==
=== Key ===
- Q = Qualifier
- WC = Wild card
- LL = Lucky loser
- Alt = Alternate
- SE = Special exempt
- PR = Protected ranking
- ITF = ITF entry
- JE = Junior exempt
- w/o = Walkover
- r = Retired
- d = Defaulted
- SR = Special ranking

=== Final four ===
Semifinals
(Italy) Alberto Brizzi	0	0
(Netherlands) Thiemo de Bakker	6	6
3	(Germany) Florian Mayer	3	2
2	(Australia) Peter Luczak	6	6

Final
(Netherlands) Thiemo de Bakker	6	7
2	(Australia) Peter Luczak	4	6^{7}

=== Top half ===
First round
1	(Germany) B Phau	6^{2}	4
(Spain) J Checa-Calvo	7	6
Q	(Sweden) T Goransson	3	2
(Germany) M Bachinger	6	6
(Romania) G Moraru	1	1
Q	(Germany) S Rieschick	6	6
(Italy) A Brizzi	6	6
8	(Slovakia) K Čapkovič	4	4
4	(France) S Robert	7	6^{3}	3
(Austria) P Oswald	6^{3}	7	6
(Austria) A Peya	4	4
(Netherlands) T de Bakker	6	6
Q	(Spain) A Vivanco-Guzmán	7	1	6
(Croatia) A Veić	6^{1}	6	3
(France) R Jouan	6	5	3
6	(Austria) A Haider-Maurer	3	7	6

Second round
(Spain) J Checa-Calvo	6	2	3
(Germany) M Bachinger	2	6	6
Q	(Germany) S Rieschick	6^{4}	6^{5}
(Italy) A Brizzi	7	7
(Austria) P Oswald	6	2	6^{1}
(Netherlands) T de Bakker	3	6	7
Q	(Spain) A Vivanco-Guzmán	7	1	6^{4}
6	(Austria) A Haider-Maurer	6^{5}	6	7

Quarterfinals
(Germany) M Bachinger	6	6^{5}	4
(Italy) A Brizzi	3	7	6
(Netherlands) T de Bakker	6	1
6	(Austria) A Haider-Maurer	4	0	r

Semifinals
(Italy) A Brizzi	0	0
(Netherlands) T de Bakker	6	6

=== Bottom half ===
First round
5	(Germany) J Reister	6^{6}	6^{5}
WC	(Finland) H Kontinen	7	7
(Italy) S Vagnozzi	6	6
(Finland) M Kontinen	4	2
(Czech Republic) J Minář	4	1
(France) É Prodon	6	6
(Brazil) A Ghem	3	3
3	(Germany) F Mayer	6	6
7	(Kazakhstan) Y Schukin	6	5	6
WC	(Finland) H Laaksonen	3	7	2
WC	(Greece) A Jakupovic	2	4
(Italy) A Arnaboldi	6	6
(Latvia) A Juška	1	3
(Argentina) M Alund	6	6
Q	(France) A Gensse	6	4	1
2	(Australia) P Luczak	0	6	6

Second round
WC	(Finland) H Kontinen	6	6
(Italy) S Vagnozzi	4	3
(France) É Prodon	4	4
3	(Germany) F Mayer	6	6
7	(Kazakhstan) Y Schukin	6^{5}	6	6
(Italy) A Arnaboldi	7	3	3
(Argentina) M Alund	3	5
2	(Australia) P Luczak	6	7

Quarterfinals
WC	(Finland) H Kontinen	2	4
3	(Germany) F Mayer	6	6
7	(Kazakhstan) Y Schukin	0	6^{5}
2	(Australia) P Luczak	6	7

Semifinals
3	(Germany) F Mayer	3	2
2	(Australia) P Luczak	6	6
