= 2013 Tampere Open – Women's singles =

Women's singles
- 2013 Tampere Open

Final
- Champion: (Denmark) Karen Barbat
- Runner-up: (Russia) Liubov Vasilyeva
- Score: 6–1, 7–6^{(7–5)}

Events
Singles	men	women
Doubles	men	women
← 2012 ·	Tampere Open	· 2014 →

Sandra Roma was the defending champion, having won the tennis event in 2012, but she chose not to defend her title.

Karen Barbat won the title, defeating Liubov Vasilyeva in the final, 6–1, 7–6^{(7–5)}.

== Seeds ==
1. (Russia) Tamara Bizhukova (first round)
2. (Finland) Piia Suomalainen (first round)
3. (Sweden) Malin Ulvefeldt (first round)
4. (Russia) Julia Valetova (second round)
5. (Denmark) Karen Barbat (champion)
6. (Italy) Francesca Palmigiano (second round)
7. (Hungary) Naomi Totka (first round)
8. (Russia) Alena Tarasova (semifinals)

== Main draw ==
=== Key ===
- Q = Qualifier
- WC = Wild card
- LL = Lucky loser
- Alt = Alternate
- SE = Special exempt
- PR = Protected ranking
- ITF = ITF entry
- JE = Junior exempt
- w/o = Walkover
- r = Retired
- d = Defaulted
- SR = Special ranking

=== Finals ===
Semifinals
8	(Russia) Alena Tarasova	6	2	4
5	(Denmark) Karen Barbat	1	6	6
(Russia) Anna Koval	4	5
(Russia) Liubov Vasilyeva	6	7

Final
5	(Denmark) Karen Barbat	6	7^{7}
(Russia) Liubov Vasilyeva	1	6^{5}

=== Top half ===
First round
1	(Russia) T Bizhukova	6	6^{3}	3
(Poland) P Czarnik	2	7^{7}	6
Q	(Sweden) J Klackenberg	5	1
Q	(Austria) T Schiechtl	7	6
WC	(Finland) T Tuomi	2	2
Q	(Estonia) E Paalma	6	6
(France) A Cazeaux	4	5
8	(Russia) A Tarasova	6	7
3	(Sweden) M Ulvefeldt	3	6	5
(Sweden) B Cedermark	6	4	7
(Russia) D Afanasyeva	0	7^{7}	2
WC	(Finland) E Leivo	6	6^{4}	6
(Finland) MN Eklund	3	2
Q	(Russia) A Lysakova	6	6
(Sweden) R Poikajärvi	3	1
5	(Denmark) K Barbat	6	6

Second round
(Poland) P Czarnik	2	7	6
Q	(Austria) T Schiechtl	6	5	2
Q	(Estonia) E Paalma	6^{4}	6	2
8	(Russia) A Tarasova	7^{7}	4	6
(Sweden) B Cedermark	4	6	7
WC	(Finland) E Leivo	6	3	5
Q	(Russia) A Lysakova	1	6^{5}
5	(Denmark) K Barbat	6	7^{7}

Quarterfinals
(Poland) P Czarnik	2	2
8	(Russia) A Tarasova	6	6
(Sweden) B Cedermark	3	2
5	(Denmark) K Barbat	6	6

Semifinals
8	(Russia) A Tarasova	6	2	4
5	(Denmark) K Barbat	1	6	6

=== Bottom half ===
First round
7	(Hungary) N Totka	1	0
Q	(Germany) N Zander	6	6
(Russia) I Karamalak	1	6^{17}
(Germany) J Wachaczyk	6	7^{19}
(Russia) A Koval	6^{3}	6	7
(Norway) E Flood	7^{7}	4	5
Q	(Finland) J Hyöty	3	1
4	(Russia) J Valetova	6	6
6	(Italy) F Palmigiano	6	6
Q	(Russia) Z Panfilkina	3	2
Q	(Ukraine) O Piskun	6	6
WC	(Finland) M-E Pasanen	2	0
(Italy) V Prosperi	6	6
WC	(Finland) A Sillanpää	4	0
(Russia) L Vasilyeva	6	6
2	(Finland) P Suomalainen	4	2

Second round
Q	(Germany) N Zander	6	7
(Germany) J Wachaczyk	0	5
(Russia) A Koval	6	6
4	(Russia) J Valetova	1	2
6	(Italy) F Palmigiano	2	3
Q	(Ukraine) O Piskun	6	6
(Italy) V Prosperi	6	2	2
(Russia) L Vasilyeva	1	6	6

Quarterfinals
Q	(Germany) N Zander	6^{2}	6	4
(Russia) A Koval	7^{7}	1	6
Q	(Ukraine) O Piskun	0	2
(Russia) L Vasilyeva	6	6

Semifinals
(Russia) A Koval	4	5
(Russia) L Vasilyeva	6	7
