= 2010 Tampere Open – Singles =

Singles
- 2010 Tampere Open

Final
- Champion: (France) Éric Prodon
- Runner-up: (Portugal) Leonardo Tavares
- Score: 6–4, 6–4

Events
Singles	Doubles
← 2009 ·	Tampere Open	· 2011 →

Thiemo de Bakker was the defending champion but chose not to compete.
Éric Prodon defeated Leonardo Tavares 6–4, 6–4 in the final.

== Seeds ==
1. (Germany) Florian Mayer (withdrew)
2. (Spain) Óscar Hernández
3. (Germany) Dieter Kindlmann (second round)
4. (Czech Republic) Ivo Minář (second round)
5. (Netherlands) Jesse Huta Galung (second round)
6. (Finland) Henri Kontinen (withdrew)
7. (Belgium) Yannick Mertens (quarterfinals)
8. (Poland) Jerzy Janowicz (first round)

== Draw ==
=== Key ===
- Q = Qualifier
- WC = Wild card
- LL = Lucky loser
- Alt = Alternate
- SE = Special exempt
- PR = Protected ranking
- ITF = ITF entry
- JE = Junior exempt
- w/o = Walkover
- r = Retired
- d = Defaulted
- SR = Special ranking

=== Finals ===
Semifinals
(Germany) Simon Stadler	4	6^{7}
(Portugal) Leonardo Tavares	6	7
(France) Éric Prodon	2	7	6
2	(Spain) Óscar Hernández	6	6^{5}	3

Final
(Portugal) Leonardo Tavares	4	4
(France) Éric Prodon	6	6

=== Top half ===
First round
LL	(Sweden) P Rosenholm	3	4
(Italy) M Viola	6	6
(France) J Eysseric	2	3
(Italy) D Giorgini	6	6
Q	(Sweden) M Eriksson	2	4
(Germany) S Stadler	6	6
Q	(Sweden) E Eleskovic	6^{4}	5
LL	(Norway) E Tveit	7	7
4	(Czech Republic) I Minář	6	6
(Latvia) A Juška	4	3
(Portugal) L Tavares	6	6
(Australia) R Junaid	3	4
(Republic of Ireland) L Sorensen	4	7	3
(Italy) A Brizzi	6	6^{9}	6
(Germany) M Bachinger	7	6
8	(Poland) J Janowicz	5	0

Second round
(Italy) M Viola	6^{1}	6	6
(Italy) D Giorgini	7	4	2
(Germany) S Stadler	6	6
LL	(Norway) E Tveit	4	2
4	(Czech Republic) I Minář	4	6	5
(Portugal) L Tavares	6	2	7
(Italy) A Brizzi	2	7	6
(Germany) M Bachinger	6	6^{6}	2

Quarterfinals
(Italy) M Viola	3	5
(Germany) S Stadler	6	7
(Portugal) L Tavares	6	6
(Italy) A Brizzi	3	4

Semifinals
(Germany) S Stadler	4	6^{7}
(Portugal) L Tavares	6	7

=== Bottom half ===
First round
5	(Netherlands) J Huta Galung	6	6
WC	(Finland) H Heliövaara	1	2
(France) É Prodon	6	6
(Argentina) S Decoud	2	2
(Finland) T Nieminen	3	6^{6}
(Argentina) M Alund	6	7
WC	(Finland) J Paukku	4	6	1
3	(Germany) D Kindlmann	6	4	6
7	(Belgium) Y Mertens	6	4	6
Q	(Germany) P Taubert	3	6	2
WC	(Finland) M Kontinen	1	5
Q	(Brazil) A Ghem	6	7
WC	(Estonia) J Zopp	6	6
(Portugal) J Sousa	4	1
(Croatia) N Mektić	0	6^{3}
2	(Spain) Ó Hernández	6	7

Second round
5	(Netherlands) J Huta Galung	4	7	5
(France) É Prodon	6	5	7
(Argentina) M Alund	7	6
3	(Germany) D Kindlmann	6^{7}	2
7	(Belgium) Y Mertens	6	6
Q	(Brazil) A Ghem	4	3
WC	(Estonia) J Zopp	3	6	5
2	(Spain) Ó Hernández	6	4	7

Quarterfinals
(France) É Prodon	6	6
(Argentina) M Alund	0	3
7	(Belgium) Y Mertens	0	2
2	(Spain) Ó Hernández	6	6

Semifinals
(France) É Prodon	2	7	6
2	(Spain) Ó Hernández	6	6^{5}	3
