= 2009 Tampere Open – Doubles =

Doubles
- 2009 Tampere Open

Final
- Champions: (Australia) Peter Luczak (Kazakhstan) Yuri Schukin
- Runners-up: (Italy) Simone Vagnozzi (Italy) Uros Vico
- Score: 6–1, 6–7(6), [10–4]

Events
Singles	Doubles
← 2008 ·	Tampere Open	· 2010 →

Ervin Eleskovic and Michael Ryderstedt were the defending champions, but they didn't compete this year.
Peter Luczak and Yuri Schukin won in the final 6–1, 6–7(6), [10–4], against Simone Vagnozzi and Uros Vico.

== Seeds ==
1. (Italy) Simone Vagnozzi / (Italy) Uros Vico (final)
2. (Australia) Peter Luczak / (Kazakhstan) Yuri Schukin (champions)
3. (Spain) Ignacio Coll-Riudavets / (Spain) Andoni Vivanco-Guzmán (quarterfinals, withdrew due to Coll-Riudavets' ankle injury)
4. (France) Augustin Gensse / (Germany) Sebastian Rieschick (first round)

== Draw ==
=== Key ===
- Q = Qualifier
- WC = Wild card
- LL = Lucky loser
- Alt = Alternate
- SE = Special exempt
- PR = Protected ranking
- ITF = ITF entry
- JE = Junior exempt
- w/o = Walkover
- r = Retired
- d = Defaulted
- SR = Special ranking

=== Draw ===
First round
1	(Italy) S Vagnozzi (Italy) U Vico	6	6
WC	(Finland) L Kiiski (Finland) M Rammal	0	2
(Argentina) M Alund (Brazil) A Ghem	6	6
(France) J Jeanpierre (France) N Renavand	4	1
4	(France) A Gensse (Germany) S Rieschick	4	4
(Greece) A Jakupovic (Norway) E Tveit	6	6
(Finland) S Huurinanen (Finland) J Kiuru	6^{8}	5
(Italy) A Arnaboldi (Spain) J Checa-Calvo	7	7
(Finland) H Laaksonen (Austria) P Oswald	6	6
WC	(Finland) R Lanne (Finland) H Piiroinen	1	2
(Latvia) A Juška (Czech Republic) J Minář	6^{2}	1
3	(Spain) I Coll-Riudavets (Spain) A Vivanco-Guzmán	7	6
(France) R Jouan (France) S Robert	6	4	[7]
WC	(Finland) M Kontinen (Finland) T Nieminen	0	6	[10]
(Finland) H Heliövaara (Finland) H Kontinen	1	4
2	(Australia) P Luczak (Kazakhstan) Y Schukin	6	6

Quarterfinals
1	(Italy) S Vagnozzi (Italy) U Vico	6	6
(Argentina) M Alund (Brazil) A Ghem	3	3
(Greece) A Jakupovic (Norway) E Tveit	2	3
(Italy) A Arnaboldi (Spain) J Checa-Calvo	6	6
(Finland) H Laaksonen (Austria) P Oswald
3	(Spain) I Coll-Riudavets (Spain) A Vivanco-Guzmán	w/o
WC	(Finland) M Kontinen (Finland) T Nieminen	5	3
2	(Australia) P Luczak (Kazakhstan) Y Schukin	7	6

Semifinals
1	(Italy) S Vagnozzi (Italy) U Vico	6	6
(Italy) A Arnaboldi (Spain) J Checa-Calvo	2	1
(Finland) H Laaksonen (Austria) P Oswald	1	3
2	(Australia) P Luczak (Kazakhstan) Y Schukin	6	6

Finals
1	(Italy) S Vagnozzi (Italy) U Vico	1	7	[4]
2	(Australia) P Luczak (Kazakhstan) Y Schukin	6	6^{6}	[10]
