= 2011 Tampere Open =

- Date: 25–31 July
- Edition: 30th
- Location: Tampere, Finland

Champions

Singles
- (France) Éric Prodon

Doubles
- (France) Jonathan Dasnières de Veigy / (France) David Guez
← 2010 ·	Tampere Open	· 2012 →

The 2011 Tampere Open (also known as the 2011 Aamulehti Tampere Open for sponsorship purposes) was a professional tennis tournament played on clay courts. It was the 30th edition of the tournament which was part of the 2011 ATP Challenger Tour. It took place in Tampere, Finland between 25 and 31 July 2011.

== ATP entrants ==
=== Seeds ===
Country	Player	Rank^{1}	Seed
FRA	Éric Prodon	86	1
FRA	Benoît Paire	122	2
FRA	Florent Serra	131	3
FRA	David Guez	162	4
FRA	Augustin Gensse	166	5
SVK	Andrej Martin	178	6
EST	Jürgen Zopp	186	7
GER	Bastian Knittel	187	8

- ^{1} Rankings are as of July 18, 2011.

=== Other entrants ===
The following players received wildcards into the singles main draw:

- (Finland) Sami Huurinainen
- (Finland) Henri Kontinen
- (Finland) Micke Kontinen
- (Finland) Henrik Sillanpää

The following players received entry from the qualifying draw:

- (Sweden) Daniel Berta
- (France) Pierre-Hugues Herbert
- (Portugal) Gonçalo Pereira
- (France) Nicolas Renavand

The following players received entry as a lucky loser into the singles main draw:

- (Sweden) Robin Olin

== Champions ==
=== Singles ===
(France) Éric Prodon def. (France) Augustin Gensse, 6–1, 3–6, 6–2

=== Doubles ===
(France) Jonathan Dasnières de Veigy / (France) David Guez def. (France) Pierre-Hugues Herbert / (France) Nicolas Renavand, 5–7, 6–4, [10–5]
