= 2013 Tampere Open – Men's doubles =

Men's doubles
- 2013 Tampere Open

Final
- Champions: (Finland) Henri Kontinen (Serbia) Goran Tošić
- Runners-up: (Philippines) Ruben Gonzales (Australia) Chris Letcher
- Score: 6–4, 6–4

Events
| Singles | men | women |
| Doubles | men | women |
| ← 2012 · | Tampere Open | · 2014 → |

Michael Linzer and Gerald Melzer were the defending champions, having won the event in 2012, but both players chose not to defend their title.

Henri Kontinen and Goran Tošić won the title, defeating Ruben Gonzales and Chris Letcher in the final, 6–4, 6–4.

== Seeds ==
1. (Philippines) Ruben Gonzales / (Australia) Chris Letcher (final)
2. (Spain) Guillermo Olaso / (Chile) Hans Podlipnik-Castillo (first round)
3. (Spain) Gerard Granollers / (Spain) Jordi Samper-Montaña (semifinals)
4. (Finland) Henri Kontinen / (Serbia) Goran Tošić (champion)

== Draw ==
=== Key ===
- Q = Qualifier
- WC = Wild card
- LL = Lucky loser
- Alt = Alternate
- SE = Special exempt
- PR = Protected ranking
- ITF = ITF entry
- JE = Junior exempt
- w/o = Walkover
- r = Retired
- d = Defaulted
- SR = Special ranking

=== Draw ===
First round
1 | (Philippines) R Gonzales (Australia) Chris Letcher | 6 | 6
(Finland) T Nieminen (Czech Republic) Michal Schmid | 1 | 2
(Finland) Sami Huurinainen (Finland) Jesper Saarni | 6 | 4 | [8]
(Finland) H Pöllänen (Sweden) P Rosenholm | 4 | 6 | [10]
3 | (Spain) G Granollers (Spain) J Samper-Montaña | 6 | 7
(Belgium) G Gigounon (Belgium) Y Reuter | 1 | 5
WC | (France) G Mina (Finland) H Sillanpää | 3 | 6 | [6]
WC | (Finland) Timi Kivijarvi (Finland) Joel Popov | 6 | 3 | [10]
(Italy) R Marcora (Italy) Uros Vico | 4 | 2
(Netherlands) Romano Frantzen (Netherlands) T Schoorel | 6 | 6
(Finland) M Kontinen (Poland) G Panfil
4 | (Finland) H Kontinen (Serbia) G Tošić | w/o
WC | (Finland) Ristomatti Lanne (Finland) Mikko Rajamaki | 1 | 1
(Sweden) Jesper Brunström (Sweden) M Eriksson | 6 | 6
(France) A Michon (France) M Teixeira | 6 | 7
2 | (Spain) G Olaso (Chile) H Podlipnik-Castillo | 4 | 5

Quarterfinals
1 | (Philippines) R Gonzales (Australia) C Letcher | 7 | 6
(Finland) H Pöllänen (Sweden) P Rosenholm | 5 | 3
3 | (Spain) G Granollers (Spain) J Samper-Montaña | 6 | 6
WC | (Finland) T Kivijarvi (Finland) J Popov | 4 | 2
(Netherlands) Romano Frantzen (Netherlands) T Schoorel | 4 | 4
4 | (Finland) H Kontinen (Serbia) G Tošić | 6 | 6
(Sweden) J Brunström (Sweden) M Eriksson | 6^{2} | 6 | [4]
(France) A Michon (France) M Teixeira | 7 | 4 | [10]

Semifinals
1 | (Philippines) R Gonzales (Australia) C Letcher | 6 | 6
3 | (Spain) G Granollers (Spain) J Samper-Montaña | 1 | 4
4 | (Finland) H Kontinen (Serbia) G Tošić | 6 | 6
(France) A Michon (France) M Teixeira | 2 | 2

Final
1 | (Philippines) R Gonzales (Australia) C Letcher | 4 | 4
4 | (Finland) H Kontinen (Serbia) G Tošić | 6 | 6
