= 2011 BNP Paribas Polish Open =

Tennis tournament

- Date: 11–17 July
- Edition: 1st
- Location: Sopot, Poland

Champions

Singles
- (France) Éric Prodon

Doubles
- (Poland) Mariusz Fyrstenberg / (Poland) Marcin Matkowski
BNP Paribas Polish Open	· 2012 →

The 2011 BNP Paribas Polish Open was a professional tennis tournament played on hard courts. It was the first edition of the tournament which was part of the Tretorn SERIE+ of the 2011 ATP Challenger Tour. It took place in Sopot, Poland between 11 and 17 July 2011.

== ATP entrants ==
=== Seeds ===
Country	Player	Rank^{1}	Seed
CZE	Lukáš Rosol	70	1
ITA	Flavio Cipolla	105	2
FRA	Stéphane Robert	107	3
FRA	Éric Prodon	110	4
BEL	Steve Darcis	118	5
FRA	Marc Gicquel	119	6
ITA	Simone Bolelli	121	7
NED	Jesse Huta Galung	123	8

- ^{1} Rankings are as of July 4, 2011.

=== Other entrants ===
The following players received wildcards into the singles main draw:

- (Poland) Piotr Gadomski
- (Poland) Marcin Gawron
- (Poland) Andriej Kapaś
- (Poland) Grzegorz Panfil

The following players received entry as a special exempt into the singles main draw:

- (Serbia) Nikola Ćirić
- (Spain) Iván Navarro

The following players received entry from the qualifying draw:

- (Poland) Dawid Celt
- (Poland) Robert Godlewski
- (Czech Republic) Michal Konečný
- (Poland) Maciej Smoła

== Champions ==
=== Singles ===
(France) Éric Prodon def. (Serbia) Nikola Ćirić, 6–1, 6–3

=== Doubles ===
(Poland) Mariusz Fyrstenberg / (Poland) Marcin Matkowski def. (France) Olivier Charroin / (France) Stéphane Robert, 7–5, 7–6^{(7–4)}
