= 2009 Tampere Open =

- Date: July 27 – August 2
- Edition: 28th
- Location: Tampere, Finland

Champions

Singles
- (Netherlands) Thiemo de Bakker

Doubles
- (Australia) Peter Luczak / (Kazakhstan) Yuri Schukin
← 2008 ·	Tampere Open	· 2010 →

The 2009 Tampere Open was a professional tennis tournament played on outdoor red clay courts. It was the twenty-eighth edition of the tournament which was part of the 2009 ATP Challenger Tour. It took place in Tampere, Finland between 27 July and 2 August 2009.

== Singles entrants ==
=== Seeds ===
Nationality	Player	Ranking*	Seeding
GER	Björn Phau	60	1
AUS	Peter Luczak	137	2
GER	Florian Mayer	150	3
FRA	Stéphane Robert	173	4
GER	Julian Reister	181	5
AUT	Andreas Haider-Maurer	192	6
KAZ	Yuri Schukin	195	7
SVK	Kamil Čapkovič	221	8

- Rankings are as of July 20, 2009.

=== Other entrants ===
The following players received wildcards into the singles main draw:

- (Greece) Alexandros Jakupovic
- (Finland) Henri Kontinen
- (Finland) Micke Kontinen
- (Finland) Henri Laaksonen

The following players received entry from the qualifying draw:

- (France) Augustin Gensse
- (Sweden) Tim Göransson
- (Germany) Sebastian Rieschick
- (Spain) Andoni Vivanco-Guzmán

== Champions ==
=== Singles ===
(Netherlands) Thiemo de Bakker def. (Australia) Peter Luczak, 6–4, 7–6(7)

=== Doubles ===
(Australia) Peter Luczak / (Kazakhstan) Yuri Schukin def. (Italy) Simone Vagnozzi / (Italy) Uros Vico, 6–1, 6–7(6), [10–4]
