= Polish Open =

Polish Open may refer to:

- Polish Open (badminton), a badminton tournament
- Orange Warsaw Open, a tennis tournament originally known as the Prokom Polish Open held from 2001 to 2008
- Polish Open (golf), a golf tournament on the Challenge Tour between 1996 and 1999, known 1998 and 1999 as the Warsaw Golf Open
- Polish Open (tennis), a men's tennis tournament held in Sopot, Poland in 2011
- WTA Poland Open, a women's tennis tournament held until 2024
- WTA Polish Open, a women's tennis tournament, held under the name Polish Open since 2022
