= 2026 Tampere Open – Singles =

Singles
- 2026 Tampere Open

Final
- Champion: (Germany) Diego Dedura
- Runner-up: (Finland) Otto Virtanen
- Score: 6–3, 6–7^{(3–7)}, 6–3

Events
Singles	Doubles
- Tampere Open

Nicolai Budkov Kjær was the defending champion but lost in the first round to Sascha Gueymard Wayenburg.

Diego Dedura won the title after defeating Otto Virtanen 6–3, 6–7^{(3–7)}, 6–3 in the final, becoming the youngest Challenger champion of the season.

== Seeds ==
1. (Norway) Nicolai Budkov Kjær (first round)
2. (Finland) Otto Virtanen (final)
3. (Belgium) Gauthier Onclin (semifinals)
4. (Belgium) Gilles-Arnaud Bailly (second round)
5. (Germany) Tom Gentzsch (quarterfinals)
6. (Germany) Henri Squire (quarterfinals, retired)
7. (Spain) Nikolás Sánchez Izquierdo (first round)
8. (Argentina) Guido Iván Justo (second round)

== Draw ==
Key

- Q = Qualifier
- WC = Wild card
- LL = Lucky loser
- Alt = Alternate
- ITF = ITF entry
- PR = Protected ranking
- SR = Special ranking
- SE = Special exempt
- JE = Junior exempt
- JR = Junior Accelerator Programme entrant
- CO = College Accelerator Programme entrant
- NG = Next Gen Accelerator Program entrant
- w/o = Walkover
- r = Retired
- d = Defaulted

=== Finals ===
Semifinals
(Germany) Diego Dedura	6	2	7^{7}
3	(Belgium) Gauthier Onclin	2	6	6^{2}
(Poland) Maks Kaśnikowski	2	2
2	(Finland) Otto Virtanen	6	6

Final
(Germany) Diego Dedura	6	6^{3}	6
2	(Finland) Otto Virtanen	3	7^{7}	3

=== Top half ===
First round
1	(Norway) N Budkov Kjær	6^{4}	3
(France) S Gueymard Wayenburg	7^{7}	6
Q	(Brazil) I Marcondes	4	6	6
WC	(Finland) Linus Lagerbohm	6	4	3
Alt	(Argentina) N Kicker	4	4
(Germany) D Dedura	6	6
Q	(Argentina) GA Olivieri	3	1
8	(Argentina) GI Justo	6	6
3	(Belgium) G Onclin	7^{15}	6
(Croatia) D Ajduković	6^{13}	1
(Argentina) A Barrena	2	3
Q	(Netherlands) N Visker	6	6
(India) S Nagal	1	6^{2}
(Bosnia and Herzegovina) A Nedić	6	7^{7}
Alt	(United States) Dali Blanch	7^{7}	5	4
5	(Germany) T Gentzsch	6^{3}	7	6

Second round
(France) S Gueymard Wayenburg	7^{7}	6^{2}	2
Q	(Brazil) I Marcondes	6^{5}	7^{7}	6
(Germany) D Dedura	6	6
8	(Argentina) GI Justo	4	2
3	(Belgium) G Onclin	6	7^{8}
Q	(Netherlands) N Visker	2	6^{6}
(Bosnia and Herzegovina) A Nedić	6	2	0
5	(Germany) T Gentzsch	4	6	6

Quarterfinals
Q	(Brazil) I Marcondes	2	2
(Germany) D Dedura	6	6
3	(Belgium) G Onclin	6	6^{5}	6
5	(Germany) T Gentzsch	2	7^{7}	3

Semifinals
(Germany) D Dedura	6	2	7^{7}
3	(Belgium) G Onclin	2	6	6^{2}

=== Bottom half ===
First round
7	(Spain) N Sánchez Izquierdo	6^{3}	6	0
WC	(Finland) E Vasa	7^{7}	4	6
(Poland) M Kaśnikowski	6	6
Q	(Germany) L Wessels	2	1
(Spain) I Montes de la Torre	3	2
(Czech Republic) H Bartoň	6	6
Alt	(Colombia) DE Galán	6^{4}	2
4	(Belgium) GA Bailly	7^{7}	6
6	(Germany) H Squire	6	7^{7}
Q	(Germany) Mika Petkovic	2	6^{3}
WC	(Finland) O Paldanius	5	6^{5}
(Uruguay) F Roncadelli	7	7^{7}
(Brazil) JL Reis da Silva	1	2
Q	(Bulgaria) D Kuzmanov	6	6
(Brazil) P Boscardin Dias	6	6^{3}	3
2	(Finland) O Virtanen	4	7^{7}	6

Second round
WC	(Finland) E Vasa	3	2
(Poland) M Kaśnikowski	6	6
(Czech Republic) H Bartoň	6	6
4	(Belgium) GA Bailly	3	2
6	(Germany) H Squire	6	6
(Uruguay) F Roncadelli	3	3
Q	(Bulgaria) D Kuzmanov	4	2
2	(Finland) O Virtanen	6	6

Quarterfinals
(Poland) M Kaśnikowski	5	6	7
(Czech Republic) H Bartoň	7	4	5
6	(Germany) H Squire	2^{r}
2	(Finland) O Virtanen	5

Semifinals
(Poland) M Kaśnikowski	2	2
2	(Finland) O Virtanen	6	6
