= 2026 Tampere Open =

- Date: 20–26 July
- Edition: 44th
- Surface: Clay
- Location: Tampere, Finland

Champions

Singles
- (Germany) Diego Dedura

Doubles
- (Netherlands) Jarno Jans / (Netherlands) Niels Visker
- Tampere Open

The 2026 Tampere Open was a professional tennis tournament played on clay courts. It was the 44th edition of the tournament which was part of the 2026 ATP Challenger Tour. It took place in Tampere, Finland, between 20 and 26 July 2026.

== Singles main draw entrants ==
=== Seeds ===
Country	Player	Rank^{1}	Seed
NOR	Nicolai Budkov Kjær	118	1
FIN	Otto Virtanen	126	2
BEL	Gauthier Onclin	169	3
BEL	Gilles-Arnaud Bailly	203	4
GER	Tom Gentzsch	212	5
GER	Henri Squire	215	6
ESP	Nikolás Sánchez Izquierdo	217	7
ARG	Guido Iván Justo	226	8

- ^{1} Rankings as of 13 July 2026.

=== Other entrants ===
The following players received wildcards into the singles main draw:

- (Finland) Linus Lagerbohm
- (Finland) Oskari Paldanius
- (Finland) Eero Vasa

The following players received entry into the singles main draw as alternates:

- (United States) Dali Blanch
- (Colombia) Daniel Elahi Galán
- (Argentina) Nicolás Kicker

The following players received entry from the qualifying draw:

- (Bulgaria) Dimitar Kuzmanov
- (Brazil) Igor Marcondes
- (Argentina) Genaro Alberto Olivieri
- (Germany) Mika Petkovic
- (Netherlands) Niels Visker
- (Germany) Louis Wessels

== Champions ==
=== Singles ===
- (Germany) Diego Dedura def. (Finland) Otto Virtanen 6–3, 6–7^{(3–7)}, 6–3.

=== Doubles ===
- (Netherlands) Jarno Jans / (Netherlands) Niels Visker def. (France) Matt Ponchet / (Denmark) Oskar Brostrøm Poulsen 6–2, 6–1.
