= 2026 Tampere Open – Doubles =

Doubles
- 2026 Tampere Open

Final
- Champions: (Netherlands) Jarno Jans (Netherlands) Niels Visker
- Runners-up: (France) Matt Ponchet (Denmark) Oskar Brostrøm Poulsen
- Score: 6–2, 6–1

Events
Singles	Doubles
- Tampere Open

Christoph Negritu and Vladyslav Orlov were the defending champions but chose not to defend their title.

Jarno Jans and Niels Visker won the title after defeating Matt Ponchet and Oskar Brostrøm Poulsen 6–2, 6–1 in the final.

== Seeds ==
1. (Finland) Patrik Niklas-Salminen / (Czech Republic) Michael Vrbenský (semifinals)
2. (Poland) Karol Drzewiecki / (Poland) Piotr Matuszewski (quarterfinals)
3. (Netherlands) Jarno Jans / (Netherlands) Niels Visker (champions)
4. (Uruguay) Ignacio Carou / (Peru) Arklon Huertas del Pino (first round, retired)

== Draw ==
Key

- Q = Qualifier
- WC = Wild card
- LL = Lucky loser
- Alt = Alternate
- ITF = ITF entry
- PR = Protected ranking
- SR = Special ranking
- SE = Special exempt
- JE = Junior exempt
- JR = Junior Accelerator Programme entrant
- CO = College Accelerator Programme entrant
- NG = Next Gen Accelerator Program entrant
- w/o = Walkover
- r = Retired
- d = Defaulted

First round
1	(Finland) P Niklas-Salminen (Czech Republic) M Vrbenský	6	6
(Serbia) I Sabanov (Serbia) M Sabanov	4	4
(Republic of Ireland) C Barry (Bulgaria) A Genov	4	4
(Poland) S Kielan (Austria) M Neuchrist	6	6
PR	(India) Atharva Sharma (Australia) J Taylor	4	0
WC	(Finland) O Paldanius (Poland) A Ważny	6	6
(Germany) J Opitz (Germany) L Wessels	7^{8}	7^{7}
(United States) C Papa (China) B Zheng	6^{6}	6^{3}
(Netherlands) M Hermans (Brazil) I Marcondes	6	2
4	(Uruguay) I Carou (Peru) A Huertas del Pino	3	1^{r}
WC	(Finland) E Vasa (Finland) Iiro Vasa	5	6	[6]
(France) Matt Ponchet (Denmark) OB Poulsen	7	3	[10]
(Cyprus) E Neos (Poland) Piotr Pawlak	4	2
2	(Poland) K Drzewiecki (Poland) P Matuszewski	6	6

Quarterfinals
1	(Finland) P Niklas-Salminen (Czech Republic) M Vrbenský	6	3	[11]
(Poland) S Kielan (Austria) M Neuchrist	4	6	[9]
3	(Netherlands) J Jans (Netherlands) N Visker	6	6
WC	(Finland) O Paldanius (Poland) A Ważny	4	4
(Germany) J Opitz (Germany) L Wessels	6	3	[10]
(Netherlands) M Hermans (Brazil) I Marcondes	2	6	[8]
(France) M Ponchet (Denmark) OB Poulsen	7^{7}	6
2	(Poland) K Drzewiecki (Poland) P Matuszewski	6^{5}	4

Semifinals
1	(Finland) P Niklas-Salminen (Czech Republic) M Vrbenský	2	6	[7]
3	(Netherlands) J Jans (Netherlands) N Visker	6	4	[10]
(Germany) J Opitz (Germany) L Wessels	3	4
(France) M Ponchet (Denmark) OB Poulsen	6	6

Final
3	(Netherlands) J Jans (Netherlands) N Visker	6	6
(France) M Ponchet (Denmark) OB Poulsen	2	1
