= 2013 Tampere Open – Men's singles =

Men's singles
- 2013 Tampere Open

Final
- Champion: (Netherlands) Jesse Huta Galung
- Runner-up: (France) Maxime Teixeira
- Score: 6–4, 6–3

Events
Singles	men	women
Doubles	men	women
← 2012 ·	Tampere Open	· 2014 →

João Sousa was the defending champion but decided to compete at the 2013 Guimarães Open instead.

Jesse Huta Galung won the title, defeating Maxime Teixeira in the final, 6–4, 6–3.

== Seeds ==
1. (Spain) Rubén Ramírez Hidalgo (second round)
2. (Netherlands) Jesse Huta Galung (champion)
3. (France) Pierre-Hugues Herbert (second round)
4. (Spain) Gerard Granollers (first round)
5. (Estonia) Jürgen Zopp (semifinals)
6. (Spain) Guillermo Olaso (quarterfinals)
7. (Spain) Jordi Samper-Montaña (first round)
8. (Chile) Hans Podlipnik-Castillo (first round)

== Draw ==
=== Key ===
- Q = Qualifier
- WC = Wild card
- LL = Lucky loser
- Alt = Alternate
- SE = Special exempt
- PR = Protected ranking
- ITF = ITF entry
- JE = Junior exempt
- w/o = Walkover
- r = Retired
- d = Defaulted
- SR = Special ranking

=== Finals ===
Semifinals
(France) Maxime Teixeira	6	5	7
(Slovenia) Blaž Rola	2	7	5
5	(Estonia) Jürgen Zopp	2	7^{7}	4
2	(Netherlands) Jesse Huta Galung	6	6^{5}	6

Final
(France) Maxime Teixeira	4	3
2	(Netherlands) Jesse Huta Galung	6	6

=== Top half ===
First round
1	(Spain) R Ramírez Hidalgo	3	7	7^{7}
LL	(Sweden) P Rosenholm	6	5	6^{2}
(Russia) I Nedelko	0	3
Q	(Moldova) M Dubarenco	6	6
(France) A Michon	6^{5}	6	6
(Croatia) T Androić	7^{7}	2	1
(France) M Teixeira	6	6
8	(Chile) H Podlipnik-Castillo	3	3
4	(Spain) G Granollers	6^{2}	2
(Belgium) G Gigounon	7^{7}	6
WC	(Finland) H Pöllänen	6	6^{5}	7^{7}
WC	(Finland) H Sillanpää	3	7^{7}	6^{0}
(Slovenia) B Rola	6	6
(Belgium) Y Reuter	2	2
Q	(Netherlands) T Schoorel	6	6
7	(Spain) J Samper-Montaña	2	3

Second round
1	(Spain) R Ramírez Hidalgo	5	4
Q	(Moldova) M Dubarenco	7	6
(France) A Michon	3	2
(France) M Teixeira	6	6
(Belgium) G Gigounon	7	6
WC	(Finland) H Pöllänen	5	2
(Slovenia) B Rola	6	6
Q	(Netherlands) T Schoorel	1	3

Quarterfinals
Q	(Moldova) M Dubarenco	6	3	3
(France) M Teixeira	3	6	6
(Belgium) G Gigounon	2	4
(Slovenia) B Rola	6	6

Semifinals
(France) M Teixeira	6	5	7
(Slovenia) B Rola	2	7	5

=== Bottom half ===
First round
5	(Estonia) J Zopp	6	6
(United Kingdom) D Smethurst	0	2
WC	(Finland) Joel Popov	0	0
Q	(Sweden) M Eriksson	6	6
(Austria) M Linzer	2	3
WC	(Finland) M Kontinen	6	6
(Italy) R Marcora	7^{10}	3	6^{3}
3	(France) P-H Herbert	6^{8}	6	7^{7}
6	(Spain) G Olaso	4	6	6
(Finland) T Nieminen	6	4	2
(Italy) L Giustino	6	3	2
(Czech Republic) Michal Schmid	3	6	6
(Germany) P Torebko	6	6^{4}	6
Q	(Australia) A Whittington	3	7^{7}	1
(Poland) G Panfil	6^{5}	4
2	(Netherlands) J Huta Galung	7^{7}	6

Second round
5	(Estonia) J Zopp	5	6	6
Q	(Sweden) M Eriksson	7	4	2
WC	(Finland) M Kontinen	6	7^{7}
3	(France) P-H Herbert	3	6^{4}
6	(Spain) G Olaso	1	7	6
(Czech Republic) M Schmid	6	5	3
(Germany) P Torebko	1	1
2	(Netherlands) J Huta Galung	6	6

Quarterfinals
5	(Estonia) J Zopp	4	6	7
WC	(Finland) M Kontinen	6	3	5
6	(Spain) G Olaso	6^{3}	4
2	(Netherlands) J Huta Galung	7^{7}	6

Semifinals
5	(Estonia) J Zopp	2	7^{5}	4
2	(Netherlands) J Huta Galung	6	6^{5}	6
