= 2010 Tampere Open =

- Date: July 26 – August 1
- Edition: 29th
- Location: Tampere, Finland

Champions

Singles
- (France) Éric Prodon

Doubles
- (Portugal) João Sousa / (Portugal) Leonardo Tavares
← 2009 ·	Tampere Open	· 2011 →

The 2010 Tampere Open was a professional tennis tournament played on outdoor red clay courts. It was the twenty-ninth edition of the tournament which was part of the 2010 ATP Challenger Tour. It took place in Tampere, Finland between 26 July and 1 August 2010.

== ATP entrants ==
=== Seeds ===
Nationality	Player	Ranking*	Seeding
GER	Florian Mayer	54	1
ESP	Óscar Hernández	158	2
GER	Dieter Kindlmann	163	3
CZE	Ivo Minář	214	4
NED	Jesse Huta Galung	223	5
FIN	Henri Kontinen	229	6
BEL	Yannick Mertens	233	7
POL	Jerzy Janowicz	239	8

- Rankings are as of July 19, 2010.

=== Other entrants ===
The following players received wildcards into the singles main draw:

- (Finland) Harri Heliövaara
- (Finland) Micke Kontinen
- (Finland) Juho Paukku
- (Estonia) Jürgen Zopp

The following players received entry from the qualifying draw:

- (Sweden) Ervin Eleskovic
- (Sweden) Markus Eriksson
- (Brazil) André Ghem
- (Sweden) Patrick Rosenholm
- (Germany) Patrick Taubert
- (Norway) Erling Tveit

== Champions ==
=== Singles ===
(France) Éric Prodon def. (Portugal) Leonardo Tavares, 6–4, 6–4

=== Doubles ===
(Portugal) João Sousa / (Portugal) Leonardo Tavares def. (Latvia) Andis Juška / (Latvia) Deniss Pavlovs, 7–6(3), 7–5
