= Tennis at the 2009 European Youth Summer Olympic Festival =

- Venue: Tampere Tennis Centre
- Dates: 19–24 July

Tennis at the 2009 European Youth Summer Olympic Festival was held at Tampere Tennis Centre, Tampere, Finland from 19 to 24 July 2009.

Tennis had doubles and singles events for men and women competition.

== Medalists ==
Event	Gold	Silver	Bronze
Boys singles	Adam Pavlásek; Czech Republic	Julien Cagnina; Belgium	Christian Perinti; Italy
Boys doubles	Italy; Michele Palma; Christian Perinti	Czech Republic; Marek Jaloviec; Adam Pavlásek	Denmark; Hans Lindenberg Stentoft; Mikael Torpegaard
Girls singles	An-Sophie Mestach; Belgium	Malin Ulvefeldt; Sweden	Ilona Kremen; Belarus
Girls doubles	Belgium; Elke Lemmens; An-Sophie Mestach	Belarus; Darya Chernetsova; Ilona Kremen	Switzerland; Mégane Bianco; Gaëlle Rey

== Medal table ==
Rank	Nation	Gold	Silver	Bronze	Total
1	Belgium (BEL)	2	1	0	3
2	Czech Republic (CZE)	1	1	0	2
3	Italy (ITA)	1	0	1	2
4	Belarus (BLR)	0	1	1	2
5	Sweden (SWE)	0	1	0	1
6	Denmark (DEN)	0	0	1	1
6	Switzerland (SUI)	0	0	1	1
Totals (7 entries)		4	4	4	12
