= 2013 Tampere Open =

- Date: 22–28 July
- Edition: 32nd (men); 7th (women)
- Category: ATP Challenger Tour; ITF Women's Circuit
- Prize money: €42,500 (men) $10,000 (women)
- Surface: Hard
- Location: Tampere, Finland

Champions

Men's singles
- (Netherlands) Jesse Huta Galung

Women's singles
- (Denmark) Karen Barbat

Men's doubles
- (Finland) Henri Kontinen / (Montenegro) Goran Tošić

Women's doubles
- (Germany) Julia Wachaczyk / (Germany) Nina Zander
- Tampere Open

The 2013 Tampere Open was a professional tennis tournament played on clay courts. It was the 32nd edition of the tournament which was part of the 2013 ATP Challenger Tour and the 2013 ITF Women's Circuit. It took place in Tampere, Finland, on 22–28 July 2013.

== Men's singles main draw entrants ==
=== Seeds ===
Country	Player	Rank^{1}	Seed
ESP	Rubén Ramírez Hidalgo	112	1
NED	Jesse Huta Galung	134	2
FRA	Pierre-Hugues Herbert	218	3
ESP	Gerard Granollers	234	4
EST	Jürgen Zopp	240	5
ESP	Guillermo Olaso	242	6
ESP	Jordi Samper Montaña	243	7
CHI	Hans Podlipnik-Castillo	271	8

- ^{1} Rankings as of 15 July 2013

=== Other entrants ===
The following players received wildcards into the singles main draw:

- (Finland) Micke Kontinen
- (Finland) Herkko Pöllänen
- (Finland) Joel Popov
- (Finland) Henrik Sillanpää

The following players received entry from the qualifying draw:

- (Moldova) Maxim Dubarenco
- (Sweden) Markus Eriksson
- (Netherlands) Thomas Schoorel
- (Australia) Andrew Whittington

The following player received entry as a lucky loser:

- (Sweden) Patrik Rosenholm

== Women's singles main draw entrants ==
=== Seeds ===
Country	Player	Rank^{1}	Seed
RUS	Tamara Bizhukova	638	1
FIN	Piia Suomalainen	675	2
SWE	Malin Ulvefeldt	693	3
RUS	Julia Valetova	703	4
DEN	Karen Barbat	718	5
ITA	Francesca Palmigiano	723	6
HUN	Naomi Totka	735	7
RUS	Alena Tarasova	745	8

- ^{1} Rankings as of 15 July 2013

=== Other entrants ===
The following players received wildcards into the singles main draw:

- (Finland) Ella Leivo
- (Finland) Milka-Emilia Pasanen
- (Finland) Annika Sillanpää
- (Finland) Tanja Tuomi

The following players received entry from the qualifying draw:

- (Finland) Johanna Hyöty
- (Sweden) Julia Klackenberg
- (Russia) Antonina Lysakova
- (Estonia) Eva Paalma
- (Russia) Zhanna Panfilkina
- (Ukraine) Oleksandra Piskun
- (Austria) Tina Schiechtl
- (Germany) Nina Zander

== Champions ==
=== Men's singles ===
- (Netherlands) Jesse Huta Galung def. (France) Maxime Teixeira 6–4, 6–3

=== Women's singles ===
- (Denmark) Karen Barbat def. (Russia) Liubov Vasilyeva 6–1, 7–6^{(7–5)}

=== Men's doubles ===
- (Finland) Henri Kontinen / (Montenegro) Goran Tošić def. (Philippines) Ruben Gonzales / (Australia) Chris Letcher 6–4, 6–4

=== Women's doubles ===
- (Germany) Julia Wachaczyk / (Germany) Nina Zander def. (Finland) Emma Laine / (Finland) Piia Suomalainen 6–4, 6–4
