= 2011 Tampere Open – Doubles =

Doubles
- 2011 Tampere Open

Final
- Champions: (France) Jonathan Dasnières de Veigy (France) David Guez
- Runners-up: (France) Pierre-Hugues Herbert (France) Nicolas Renavand
- Score: 5–7, 6–4, [10–5]

Events
Singles	Doubles
- Tampere Open

João Sousa and Leonardo Tavares were the defending champions, but they withdrew before their match against Dasnières de Veigy and Guez.

Jonathan Dasnières de Veigy and David Guez won this tournament, defeating their compatriots Pierre-Hugues Herbert and Nicolas Renavand 5–7, 6–4, [10–5] in the final.

== Seeds ==
1. (France) Pierre-Hugues Herbert / (France) Nicolas Renavand (final)
2. (Finland) Harri Heliövaara / (Finland) Juho Paukku (quarterfinals)
3. (Portugal) João Sousa / (Portugal) Leonardo Tavares (first round, withdrew)
4. (Italy) Alberto Brizzi / (Italy) Matteo Viola (first round)

== Draw ==
Key

- Q = Qualifier
- WC = Wild card
- LL = Lucky loser
- Alt = Alternate
- ITF = ITF entry
- PR = Protected ranking
- SR = Special ranking
- SE = Special exempt
- JE = Junior exempt
- JR = Junior Accelerator Programme entrant
- CO = College Accelerator Programme entrant
- NG = Next Gen Accelerator Program entrant
- w/o = Walkover
- r = Retired
- d = Defaulted

=== Draw ===
First round
1	(France) P-H Herbert (France) N Renavand	6	6
WC	(Finland) Jesse Kiuru (Finland) Ilja Orre	3	3
WC	(Finland) Saska Huttunen (Finland) Timi Kivijärvi	2	4
(Finland) Sami Huurinainen (Finland) Jesper Saarni	6	6
4	(Italy) A Brizzi (Italy) M Viola	4	2
WC	(Germany) Michael Schidtmann (Germany) Jan Stremmel	6	6
(Portugal) Gonçalo Pereira (Sweden) Lucas Renard	4	2
(Finland) H Kontinen (Finland) M Kontinen	6	6
(Hungary) József Both (Hungary) Á Kellner	6	6
(Finland) Tuomas Manner (Sweden) Robin Olin	2	0
(France) J Dasnières de Veigy (France) D Guez
3	(Portugal) J Sousa (Portugal) L Tavares	w/o
(Finland) T Nieminen (Estonia) J Zopp	7^{7}	6
(France) J Eysseric (France) B Paire	6^{2}	2
(France) É Prodon (Finland) Henrik Sillanpää	4	4
2	(Finland) H Heliövaara (Finland) J Paukku	6	6

Quarterfinals
1	(France) P-H Herbert (France) N Renavand	6	6
(Finland) Sami Huurinainen (Finland) Jesper Saarni	0	4
WC	(Germany) Michael Schidtmann (Germany) Jan Stremmel	4	2
(Finland) H Kontinen (Finland) M Kontinen	6	6
(Hungary) József Both (Hungary) Á Kellner	3	0
(France) J Dasnières de Veigy (France) D Guez	6	6
(Finland) T Nieminen (Estonia) J Zopp	7	6
2	(Finland) H Heliövaara (Finland) J Paukku	5	3

Semifinals
1	(France) P-H Herbert (France) N Renavand	6	6
(Finland) H Kontinen (Finland) M Kontinen	2	3
(France) J Dasnières de Veigy (France) D Guez	6	4	[10]
(Finland) T Nieminen (Estonia) J Zopp	3	6	[6]

Final
1	(France) P-H Herbert (France) N Renavand	7	4	[5]
(France) J Dasnières de Veigy (France) D Guez	5	6	[10]
