= Diego Dedura =

German tennis player (born 2008)

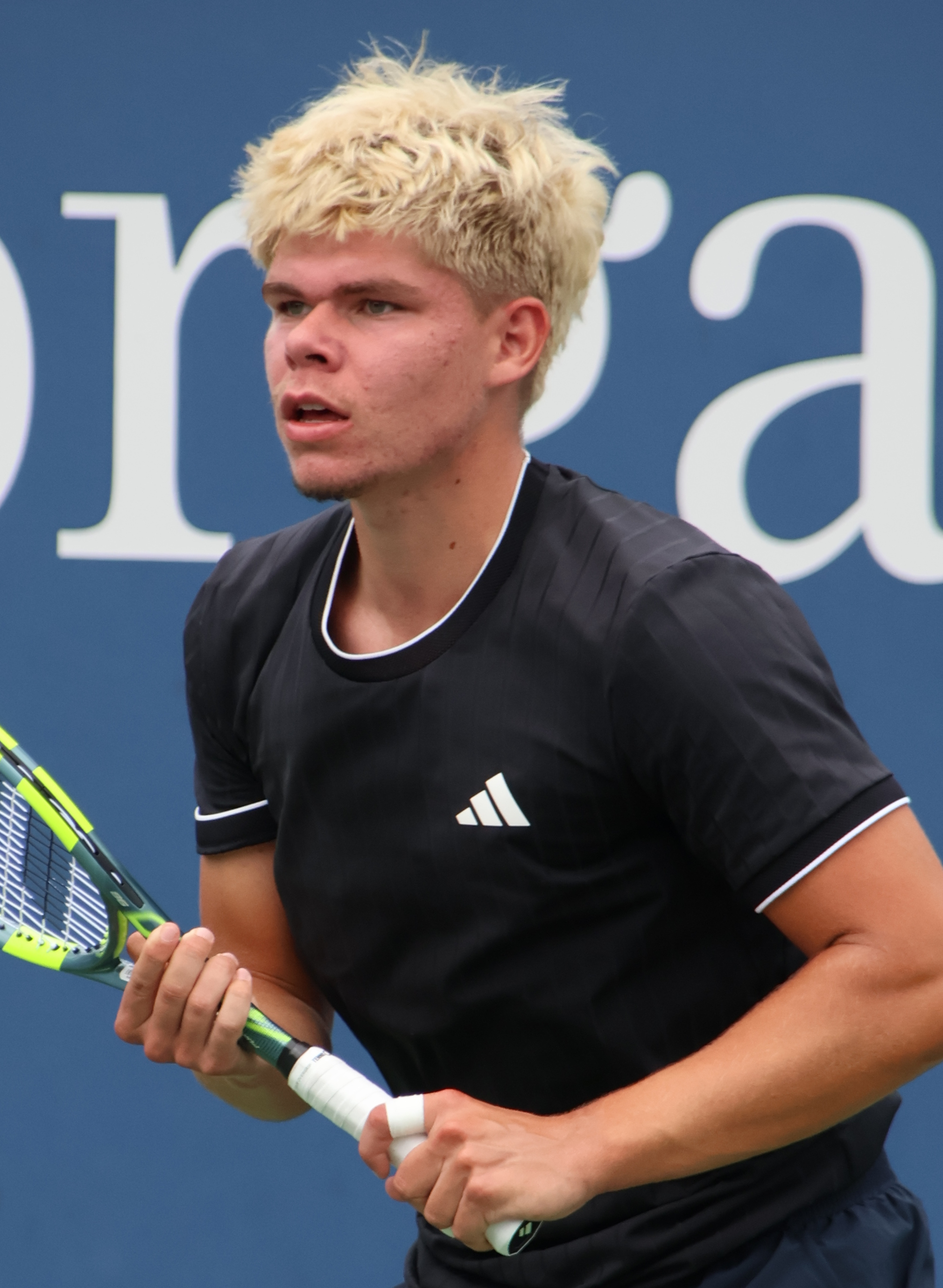
- Dedura at the 2026 US Open
- Full name: Diego Dedura-Palomero
- Country (sports): Germany
- Born: 12 March 2008 (age 18) Berlin, Germany
- Height: 1.80 m (5 ft 11 in)
- Turned pro: 2025
- Plays: Left-handed (two-handed backhand)
- Coach: Cesar Palomero, Ruta Deduraite
- Prize money: US $313,849

Singles
- Career record: 1–5 (at ATP Tour level, Grand Slam level, and in Davis Cup)
- Career titles: 0
- Highest ranking: No. 184 (26 October 2026)
- Current ranking: No. 185 (9 November 2026)

Grand Slam singles results
- US Open: Q1 (2026)

Doubles
- Career record: 0–0 (at ATP Tour level, Grand Slam level, and in Davis Cup)
- Career titles: 0
- Highest ranking: No. 1,647 (3 November 2025)
- Last updated on: 9 November 2026.

Diego Dedura-Palomero (born 12 March 2008) is a German professional tennis player. He has a career-high ATP singles ranking of No. 184 achieved on 26 October 2026.

== Early life ==
Dedura was born in Berlin, Germany to a diverse family background: His father, Cesar Palomero, is from Chile and his mother, Ruta (née Deduraite) Deduraite-Palomero is from Lithuania. He started taking tennis lessons as a kid with his own father.

== Career ==
=== 2024: ATP Challenger Tour debut ===
Despite his early focus on the Professional Tour, Dedura had a few good results on the ITF junior circuit. In June 2024, he and compatriot Niels McDonald won the doubles title at the J300 tournament in Bamberg.

Dedura made his ATP Challenger Tour main draw debut at the age of 16 as a qualifier at the Schwaben Open in Augsburg, reaching the second round.

=== 2025: First ATP win at age 17, top 400 ===
He reached an ITF junior combined ranking of No. 27 on 6 January 2025.

In April, at the age of 17, Dedura made his ATP Tour main draw debut as a lucky loser at the BMW Open in Munich, replacing Gael Monfils, where he won against eight seed Denis Shapovalov via retirement in the first round and became the first player born in 2008 or later to win an ATP Tour match. He lost to Zizou Bergs in the second round. Later that month, the German announced that he would forgo the second part of his surname as a player. In December, Dedura won his first professional title, a Futures-level event at M15 Agadir, Morocco.

=== 2026: Maiden Challenger title, top 200 ===
Dedura won his first ATP Challenger singles title at the Tampere Open in Finland, defeating second seed Otto Virtanen in the final. As a result he reached the top 200 in the singles rankings on 27 July 2026 and became the youngest Challenger champion of the season.

== Personal life ==
Dedura has an older brother, Mariano, who also plays tennis. His mother and father are former professional tennis players. Dedura speaks four languages: German, English, Spanish and Lithuanian.

== Performance timeline ==
Key
W	F	SF	QF	#R	RR	Q#	DNQ	A	NH

(W) winner; (F) finalist; (SF) semifinalist; (QF) quarterfinalist; (#R) rounds 4, 3, 2, 1; (RR) round-robin stage; (Q#) qualification round; (DNQ) did not qualify; (A) absent; (NH) not held; (SR) strike rate (events won / competed); (W–L) win–loss record.
To avoid confusion and double counting, these charts are updated at the conclusion of a tournament or when the player's participation has ended.

=== Singles ===
Current through the 2026 US Open qualifying.

Tournament	2025	2026	SR	W–L
Grand Slam tournaments
Australian Open	A	A	0 / 0	0–0
French Open	A	A	0 / 0	0–0
Wimbledon	A	A	0 / 0	0–0
US Open	A	Q1	0 / 0	0–0
Win–loss	0–0	0–0	0 / 0	0–0
ATP 1000 tournaments
Miami Open	A	Q1	0 / 0	0–0
Madrid Open	Q1	Q2	0 / 0	0–0
Career statistics
Tournaments	2	3	5	
Overall win–loss	1–2	0–3	1–5	
Year-end ranking	386			

== ATP Challenger Tour finals ==
=== Singles: 1 (title) ===
Legend ATP Challenger (1–0)	Finals by surface Hard (–) Clay (1–0)

Result	W–L	Date	Tournament	Surface	Opponent	Score
Win	1–0	Jul 2026	Tampere Open, Finland	Clay	(Finland) Otto Virtanen	6–3, 6–7^{(3–7)}, 6–3

== ITF World Tennis Tour finals ==
=== Singles: 5 (2 titles, 3 runner-ups) ===
Legend ITF WTT (2–3)	Finals by surface Hard (–) Clay (2–3)

Result	W–L	Date	Tournament	Surface	Opponent	Score
Loss	0–1	Oct 2024	M25 Pula, Italy	Clay	(Spain) Daniel Rincón	2–6, 7–6^{(7–5)}, 3–6
Loss	0–2	May 2025	M15 Villach, Austria	Clay	(Argentina) Alex Barrena	3–6, 3–6
Win	1–2	Dec 2025	M15 Agadir, Morocco	Clay	(Morocco) Reda Bennani	6–2, 7–5
Loss	1–3	Dec 2025	M25 Marrakech, Morocco	Clay	(France) Sean Cuenin	1–6, 6–2, 6–7^{(1–7)}
Win	2–3	Mar 2026	M25 Yerba Buena, Argentina	Clay	(Argentina) Luciano Emanuel Ambrogi	6–3, 7–6^{(7–3)}
