= Beatrice Cedermark =

Swedish tennis player

- Full name: Beatrice Cedermark
- Country (sports): Sweden
- Born: 12 February 1993 (age 32); Sweden
- Prize money: $18,016

Singles
- Career record: 65–70
- Career titles: 0
- Highest ranking: 612 (13 August 2012)

Doubles
- Career record: 25–41
- Career titles: 1 ITF
- Highest ranking: 716 (11 June 2012)

Beatrice Cedermark (born 12 February 1993) is a Swedish tennis player.

Cedermark won one doubles title on the ITF tour in her career. On 13 August 2012, she reached her best singles ranking of world number 612. On 11 June 2012, she peaked at world number 716 in the doubles rankings.

Cedermark made her WTA tour debut at the 2012 Swedish Open, partnering Rebecca Peterson in doubles.

== ITF finals (1–3) ==
=== Singles (0–2) ===
| Legend $100,000 tournaments $75,000 tournaments $50,000 tournaments $25,000 tournaments $15,000 tournaments $10,000 tournaments | Finals by surface Hard (0–1) Clay (0–1) Grass (0–0) Carpet (0–0) |

| Outcome | No. | Date | Tournament | Surface | Opponent | Score |
|---|---|---|---|---|---|---|
| Runner-up | 1. | 7 February 2011 | Antalya, Turkey | Clay | (Italy) Carolina Pillot | 5–7, 0–6 |
| Runner-up | 2. | 21 May 2012 | İzmir, Turkey | Hard | (Turkey) Başak Eraydın | 0–6, 1–6 |

=== Doubles (1–1) ===
| Legend $100,000 tournaments $75,000 tournaments $50,000 tournaments $25,000 tournaments $15,000 tournaments $10,000 tournaments | Finals by surface Hard (0–1) Clay (1–0) Grass (0–0) Carpet (0–0) |

| Outcome | No. | Date | Tournament | Surface | Partner | Opponents | Score |
|---|---|---|---|---|---|---|---|
| Runner-up | 1. | 16 January 2012 | Coimbra, Portugal | Hard | (Sweden) Matilda Hamlin | (Slovakia) Lucia Butkovská (Norway) Ulrikke Eikeri | 3–6, 1–6 |
| Winner | 1. | 13 May 2013 | Båstad, Sweden | Clay | (Sweden) Ellen Allgurin | (Sweden) Rebecca Peterson (Sweden) Malin Ulvefeldt | 6–3, 6–0 |
