= Dawid Celt =

Polish tennis coach

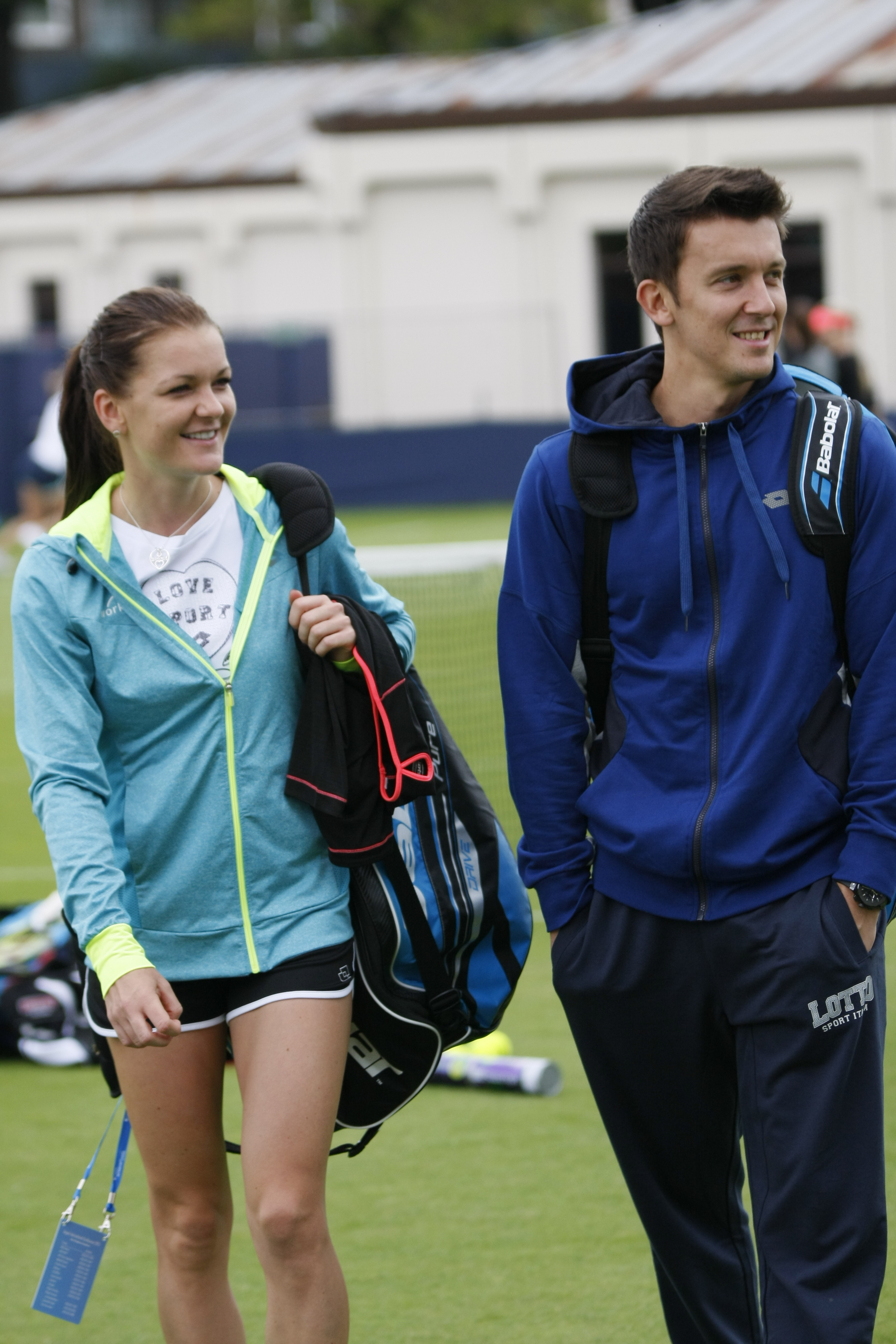
- Agnieszka Radwańska and Celt in 2015
- Country (sports): Poland
- Born: 29 November 1985 (age 39); Częstochowa, Poland
- Turned pro: 2003
- Retired: 2011
- Prize money: $10,968

Singles
- Highest ranking: No. 852 (29 September 2011)

Doubles
- Highest ranking: No. 1151 (15 October 2007)

Coaching career
- Agnieszka Radwańska (2011–2018; hitting partner); Magda Linette (2021)

Dawid Celt (Polish pronunciation: [ˈda.vit t͡sɛlt]; born 29 November 1985) is a Polish tennis coach, commentator and former player. He is the husband and former hitting partner of onetime Women's Tennis Association (WTA) No. 2 Agnieszka Radwańska. Since 2018, Celt has captained Poland's Billie Jean King Cup team.

== Career ==
Celt was born in 1985 in Częstochowa, in southern Poland. His childhood dream was football, but he took up tennis at the encouragement of his father, Józef, who was a tennis coach. In his youth, Celt played both football and tennis at Victoria Częstochowa sports club, the latter under his father's tutelage, and eventually committed to just tennis.

In his late teens, Celt moved to Warsaw to develop his tennis career further, and in 2003 won a Grade 4 junior ITF event in doubles and began to play on the ITF Futures Circuit. However, his professional playing career ended early, in 2011, due to a serious thigh injury picked up in 2009; his peak Association of Tennis Professionals (ATP) singles ranking was No. 852, achieved in 2011. Celt began appearing as a tennis commentator on Eurosport Polska and TVP Sport the next year.

In 2011, while still active on the ATP Tour, Celt joined the coaching team of longtime female Polish No. 1 Agnieska Radwańska, becoming her permanent hitting partner. He was also a hitting partner and assistant coach for the Polish Fed Cup team, led by captain Tomasz Wiktorowski, from 2011 to 2014. While working with Celt and Wiktorowski (Radwańska's primary coach), Radwańska reached a peak WTA ranking of No. 2, and won the WTA Fan Favorite Award six consecutive times, before her retirement from tennis in 2018.

Celt was named captain of the Polish contingent of the Fed Cup (later named Billie Jean King Cup) at the start of 2018. Celt helped take Poland to its first Billie Jean King Cup Finals in 2022. Celt and Radwańska were co-captains of Poland at the inaugural 2023 United Cup, where the country reached the semifinals.

Top 50 player Magda Linette, part of Celt's Billie Jean King Cup team, hired him to be her individual coach in 2021.

== Personal life ==
Celt and Radwańska, who first met in 2008, became close when he joined her coaching team, and started officially dating in 2013. Engaged in 2016, they got married in July 2017 in Kraków, but live primarily in Warsaw. Radwańska gave birth to their first child, Jakub, in July 2020.

A native of Częstochowa, Celt is a fan of hometown football club Raków and speedway team Włókniarz.
