= Polish Open (tennis) =

BNP Paribas Polish Open
- 2011 BNP Paribas Polish Open

Defunct tennis tournament
- Location: Sopot, Poland
- Venue: Sopocki Klub Tenisowy
- Category: ATP Challenger Tour
- Surface: Clay / Outdoors
- Draw: 32S/32Q/16D
- Prize money: €64,000+H

The Polish Open (sponsored by BNP Paribas) was a tennis tournament held in Sopot, Poland in 2011. In 2018, a new ATP Challenger Tour tournament named Sopot Open was held in Gdynia.

== Past finals ==
=== Singles ===
Year	Champion	Runner-up	Score
2011	(France) Éric Prodon	(Serbia) Nikola Ćirić	6–1, 6–3

=== Doubles ===
Year	Champions	Runners-up	Score
2011	(Poland) Mariusz Fyrstenberg (Poland) Marcin Matkowski	(France) Olivier Charroin (France) Stéphane Robert	7–5, 7–6^{(7–4)}
