= Malin Ulvefeldt =

Swedish tennis player

- Country (sports): Sweden
- Born: 27 February 1994 (age 31)
- Plays: Right-handed (two-handed backhand)
- Prize money: $15,716

Singles
- Career record: 44–47
- Career titles: 0
- Highest ranking: No. 579 (14 September 2015)
- Current ranking: No. 587 (13 July 2015)

Doubles
- Career record: 24–36
- Career titles: 1 ITF
- Highest ranking: No. 643 (4 November 2013)
- Current ranking: No. 983 (29 June 2015)
- Last updated on: 13 July 2015.

Malin Ulvefeldt (born 27 February 1994) is a Swedish tennis player.

Ulvefeldt has a career high WTA singles ranking of 587, achieved on 13 July 2015. She also has a career high WTA doubles ranking of 643 achieved on 4 November 2013. Ulvefeldt has won 1 ITF doubles title.

Ulvefeldt made her WTA main draw debut at the 2015 Swedish Open in the doubles event partnering Cornelia Lister.

== ITF finals (1–4) ==
=== Singles (0–3) ===
Legend $100,000 tournaments $75,000 tournaments $50,000 tournaments $25,000 tournaments $15,000 tournaments $10,000 tournaments	Finals by surface Hard (0–2) Clay (0–1) Grass (0–0) Carpet (0–0)

Outcome	No.	Datexf	Tournament	Surface	Opponent	Score
Runner-up	1.	16 February 2013	Linköping, Sweden	Hard (i)	(Italy) Angelica Moratelli	6–7^{(5–7)}, 1–6
Runner-up	2.	8 September 2013	Antalya, Turkey	Hard	(Romania) Ana Bogdan	0–6, 2–6
Runner-up	3.	22 June 2015	Helsingborg, Sweden	Clay	(Sweden) Sofia Arvidsson	7–6^{(7–4)}, 1–6, 2–6

=== Doubles (1–1) ===
Legend $100,000 tournaments $75,000 tournaments $50,000 tournaments $25,000 tournaments $15,000 tournaments $10,000 tournaments	Finals by surface Hard (1–0) Clay (0–1) Grass (0–0) Carpet (0–0)

Outcome	No.	Date	Tournament	Surface	Partner	Opponents	Score
Winner	1.	25 March 2013	Sharm el-Sheikh, Egypt	Hard	(Sweden) Rebecca Peterson	(Russia) Alina Mikheeva (Canada) Jillian O'Neill	6–3, 6–4
Runner-up	1.	13 May 2013	Båstad, Sweden	Clay	(Sweden) Rebecca Peterson	(Sweden) Ellen Allgurin (Sweden) Beatrice Cedermark	3–6, 0–6
