= 2012 Tampere Open =

- Date: 23–29 July
- Edition: 31st
- Surface: Hard
- Location: Tampere, Finland

Champions

Singles
- (Portugal) João Sousa

Doubles
- (Austria) Michael Linzer / (Austria) Gerald Melzer
- Tampere Open

The 2012 Tampere Open was a professional tennis tournament played on hard courts. It was the 31st edition of the tournament which was a part of the 2012 ATP Challenger Tour. It took place in Tampere, Finland from 23 until 29 July 2012.

== Singles main-draw entrants ==
=== Seeds ===
Country	Player	Rank^{1}	Seed
POR	João Sousa	143	1
POR	Gastão Elias	159	2
FRA	Éric Prodon	161	3
FRA	Jonathan Dasnières de Veigy	165	4
AUT	Michael Linzer	238	5
SUI	Michael Lammer	240	6
FIN	Harri Heliövaara	247	7
NED	Boy Westerhof	263	8

- ^{1} Rankings are as of July 16, 2012.

=== Other entrants ===
The following players received wildcards into the singles main draw:

- (Finland) Micke Kontinen
- (Switzerland) Henri Laaksonen
- (Finland) Henrik Sillanpää
- (Finland) Max Wennakoski

The following players received entry from the qualifying draw:

- (Belgium) Alexandre Folie
- (Romania) Petru-Alexandru Luncanu
- (Belgium) Yannik Reuter
- (Sweden) Patrik Rosenholm

== Champions ==
=== Singles ===
- (Portugal) João Sousa def. (France) Éric Prodon, 7–6^{(7–5)}, 6–4

=== Doubles ===
- (Austria) Michael Linzer / (Austria) Gerald Melzer def. (Belgium) Niels Desein / (Brazil) André Ghem, 6–1, 7–6^{(7–3)}
