= Augustin Gensse =

French tennis player

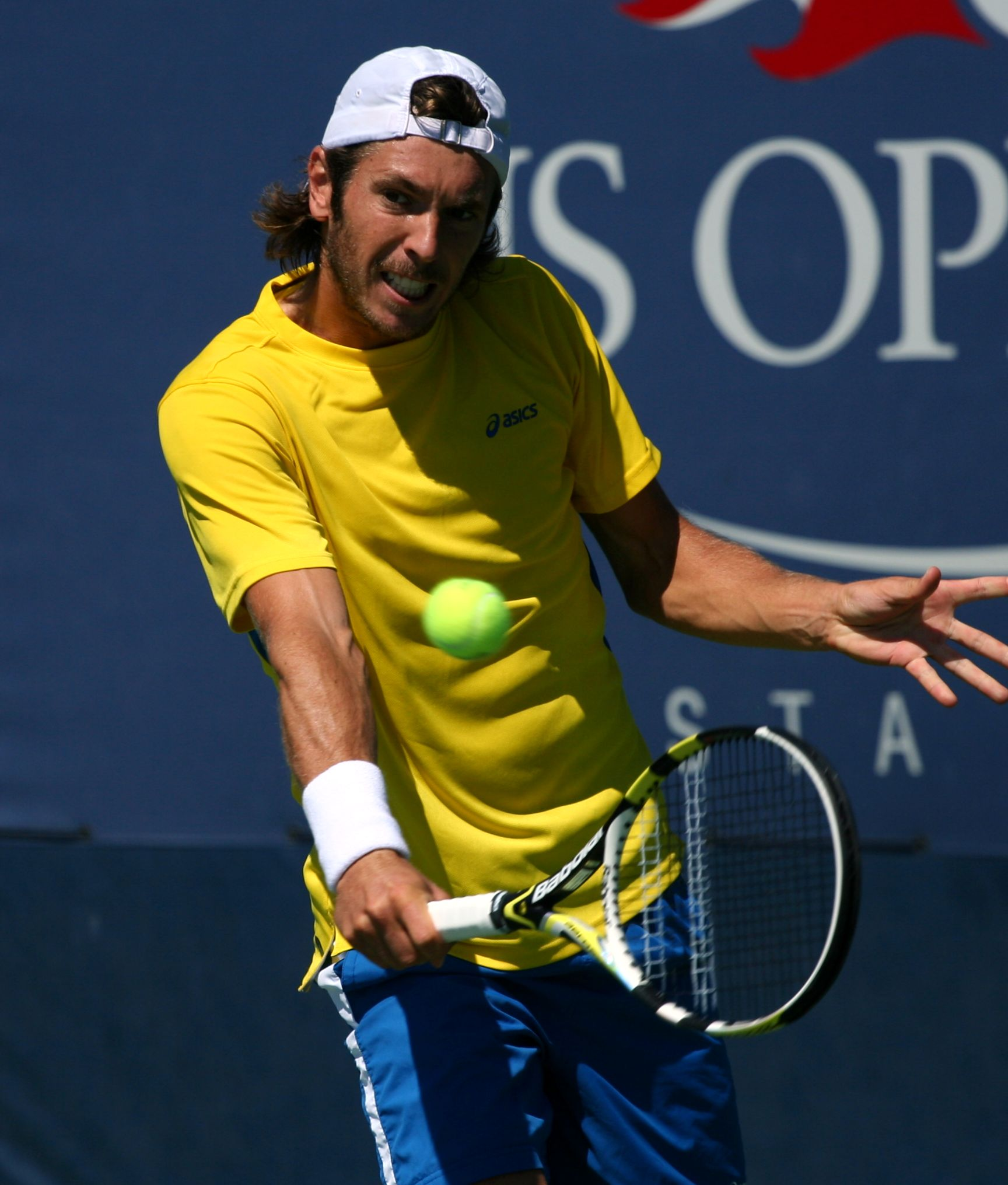
- Augustin Gensse at the 2011 US Open
- Country (sports): France
- Residence: Boulogne-Billancourt, France
- Born: 10 August 1983 (age 42) Mont-de-Marsan, France
- Height: 1.80 m (5 ft 11 in)
- Turned pro: 2001
- Plays: Right-handed (two-handed backhand)
- Coach: Jérôme Potier
- Prize money: $250,639

Singles
- Career record: 1–3
- Career titles: 0
- Highest ranking: No. 139 (7 May 2012)

Grand Slam singles results
- Australian Open: Q2 (2012)
- French Open: 1R (2011)
- Wimbledon: Q3 (2011)
- US Open: 1R (2011)

Doubles
- Career record: 0–0
- Career titles: 0
- Highest ranking: No. 363 (16 June 2008)

Coaching career (2013–)
- Michaela Hončová (2013-2014); Manon Arcangioli (2015-)
- Last updated on: December 10, 2015.

Augustin Gensse (born 10 August 1983) is a French professional tennis player.

== Tennis career ==
Gensse has played two singles matches in the ATP Tour. At the Spain (Open de Tenis Comunidad Valenciana), he defeated Gorka Frailin and Alan Mackie in the qualifications. As a qualifier, he reached the second round of the tournament, winning against James Ward and losing against Iván Navarro.

He won fourteen Challenger and Futures titles, 10 singles and 4 doubles.

In 2011, he played for the first time in a Grand Slam main draw at the 2011 French Open and lost to Stanislas Wawrinka at the first round in four sets. 4–6, 6–3, 6–2, 6–4

At the 2011 US Open, Gensse qualified for the second time of the year for a Grand Slam main draw. On the first round, he lost against Janko Tipsarević in straight sets. 6–2, 7–5, 6–0

In June 2012, he injured his ankle and was forced to stop his career. He became at the end of the year the ambassador of Decathlon and their tennis brand Artengo.

In 2015, during Roland Garros, he worked as a sparring partner. He warmed-up both finalists Novak Djokovic and Stan Wawrinka the morning of the final.

== Tennis coach ==
In January 2013, he became the coach of the Slovakian Michaela Hončová. Since May 2015, he's now the coach of the frenchwomen Manon Arcangioli.

== Career finals ==
=== Challenger and Futures titles (10) ===
Legend (singles)
Challengers (0)
Futures (10)

No.	Date	Tournament	Surface	Opponent	Score
1.	1 August 2005	Spain F18	Clay	(Spain) José Antonio Sánchez-de Luna	7–5, 6–2
2.	5 June 2006	Tunisia F2	Clay	(Morocco) Rabie Chaki	4–6, 6–4, 6–0
3.	17 July 2006	Spain F23	Clay	(Spain) Pablo Santos	1–6, 6–3, 6–3
4.	10 May 2010	USA F12	Clay	(Norway) Erling Tveit	6–3, 6–2
5.	14 June 2010	Morocco F3	Clay	(Spain) Gerard Granollers-Pujol	6–3, 6–4
6.	21 June 2010	France F9	Clay	(Canada) Philip Bester	6–1, 6–4
7.	28 June 2010	Morocco F5	Clay	(Spain) Carlos Boluda-Purkiss	6–1, 6–2
8.	9 August 2010	Germany F12	Clay	(Belgium) Alexandre Folie	6–4, 6–3
9.	16 August 2010	Latvia F1	Clay	(Czech Republic) David Novak	6–3, 6–2
10.	27 September 2010	Italy F28	Clay	(Poland) Grzegorz Panfil	6–1, 3–6, 6–2

=== Runner up (3) ===
No.	Date	Tournament	Surface	Opponent	Score
1.	29 July 2007	2007 TEAN International	Clay	(Netherlands) Jesse Huta Galung	4–6, 7–6^{(11–9)}, 6–7^{(4–7)}
2.	31 July 2011	2011 Tampere Open	Clay	(France) Éric Prodon	1–6, 6–3, 2–6
3.	8 April 2012	2012 Open Prévadiès Saint–Brieuc	Clay	(France) Grégoire Burquier	5–7, 7–6^{(7–5)}, 6–7^{(3–7)}

=== Doubles titles (4) ===
Legend
Challengers (1)
Futures (3)

No.	Date	Tournament	Surface	Partner	Opponents	Score
1.	17 July 2006	Spain F23	Clay	(Spain) Carlos Rexach-Itoiz	(Spain) Javier Foronda (Spain) Pablo Santos	6–3, 6–1
2.	25 June 2007	France F9	Clay	(Spain) David Marrero	(Italy) Adriano Biasella (Uruguay) Marcel Felder	2–6, 6–3, 7–6^{(7–5)}
3.	16 February 2009	Meknes, Morocco	Clay	(France) Éric Prodon	(Italy) Giancarlo Petrazzuolo (Italy) Simone Vagnozzi	6–1, 7–6^{(7–3)}
4.	22 June 2009	France F9	Clay	(Portugal) Leonardo Tavares	(France) Julien Jeanpierre (France) Nicolas Renavand	6–2, 6–2
