= Tampere Open =

Tournament information
- Location: Tampere, Finland
- Venue: Pyynikki Tennis Courts (1982–2007); Tampere Tennis Center (2008–)
- Surface: Clay
- Website: Official website
ATP Tour
- Category: ATP Challenger Tour
- Prize money: €42,500
WTA Tour
- Category: ITF Women's Circuit
- Prize money: $15,000

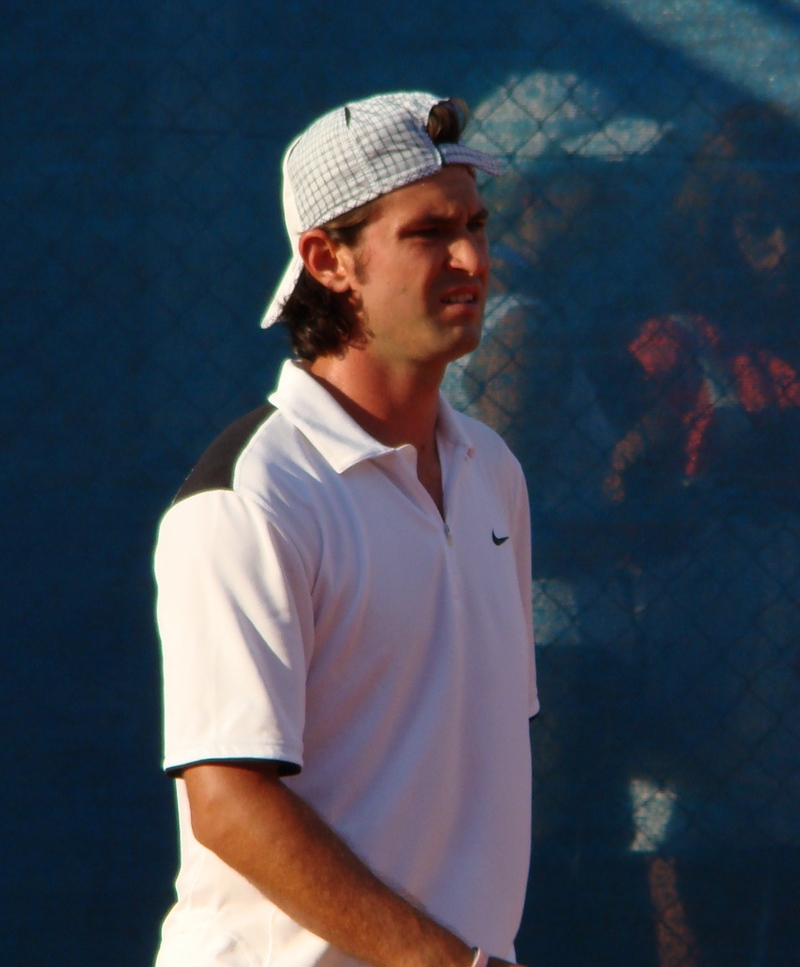
Serbian player Boris Pašanski won two back-to-back singles titles in Tampere in 2004 and 2005

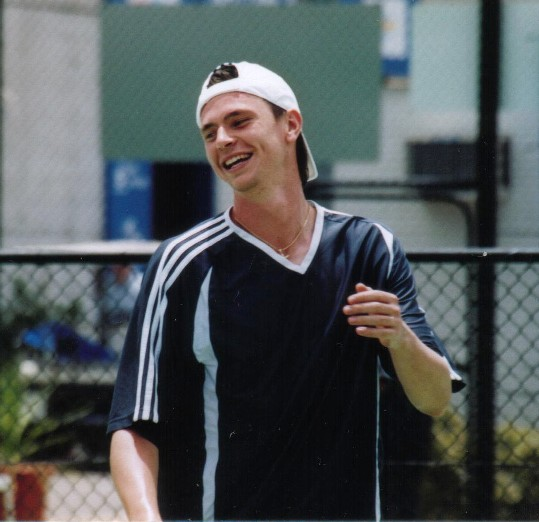
Sweden's Robin Söderling defeated Igor Andreev in 2003 to win the singles

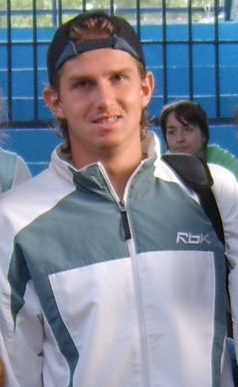
Singles runner-up that year, Russian Igor Andreev titled in doubles in 2003 alongside Dmitry Vlasov

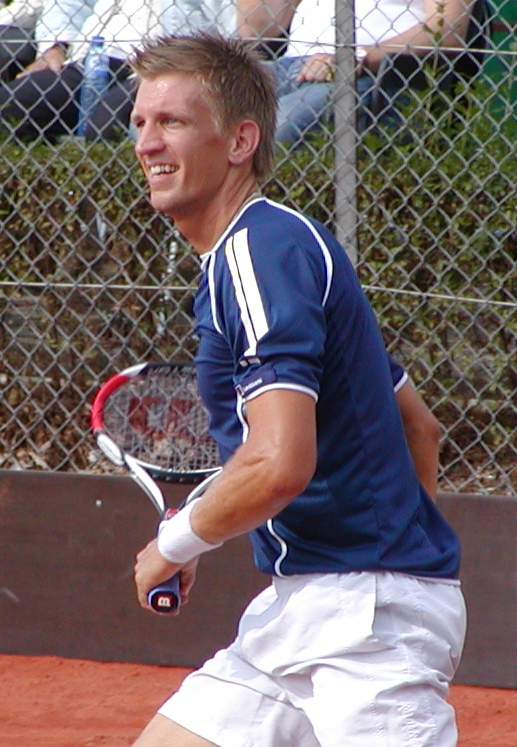
Finn Jarkko Nieminen reached two singles finals in 2001 and 2002, winning each time, and four doubles finals, winning once in 2000 with Ville Liukko.

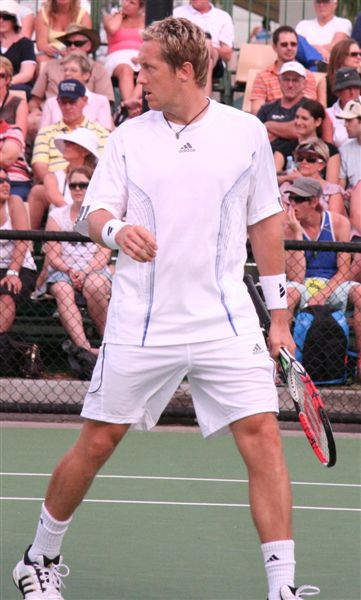
Eventual world No. 1 in doubles Jonas Björkman took the doubles title in 1992 with fellow Swede Johan Donar.

The Tampere Open is a professional tennis tournament played on clay courts. It is currently part of the ATP Challenger Tour, and has been held annually at the Tampere Tennis Center in Tampere, Finland, since 2008 (and 2007 for the women's ITF). Prior to that ATP Challenger competition was held at the Pyynikki tennis courts from 1982 to 2007. It is the longest running ATP organized event on the Challenger Tour, becoming the first tournament to celebrate its 40-year anniversary in 2022.

== Past finals ==
=== Men's singles ===
Year	Champion	Runner-up	Score
2026	(Germany) Diego Dedura	(Finland) Otto Virtanen	6–3, 6–7^{(3–7)}, 6–3
2025	(Norway) Nicolai Budkov Kjær	(France) Sascha Gueymard Wayenburg	7–6^{(7–5)}, 6–7^{(2–7)}, 6–2
2024	(Spain) Daniel Rincón	(France) Calvin Hemery	6–1, 7–6^{(7–4)}
2023	(India) Sumit Nagal	(Czech Republic) Dalibor Svrčina	6–4, 7–5
2022	(Hungary) Zsombor Piros	(France) Harold Mayot	6–2, 1–6, 6–4
2021	(Czech Republic) Jiří Lehečka	(Argentina) Nicolás Kicker	5–7, 6–4, 6–3
2020	Not held		
2019	(Sweden) Mikael Ymer	(Netherlands) Tallon Griekspoor	6–3, 5–7, 6–3
2018	(Netherlands) Tallon Griekspoor	(Argentina) Juan Ignacio Londero	6–3, 2–6, 6–3
2017	(France) Calvin Hemery	(Portugal) Pedro Sousa	6–3, 6–4
2016	(Belgium) Kimmer Coppejans	(Russia) Aslan Karatsev	6–4, 3–6, 7–5
2015	(France) Tristan Lamasine	(Brazil) André Ghem	6–3, 6–2
2014	(Belgium) David Goffin	(Finland) Jarkko Nieminen	7–6^{(7–3)}, 6–3
2013	(Netherlands) Jesse Huta Galung	(France) Maxime Teixeira	6–4, 6–3
2012	(Portugal) João Sousa	(France) Éric Prodon	7–6^{(7–5)}, 6–4
2011	(France) Éric Prodon	(France) Augustin Gensse	6–1, 3–6, 6–2
2010	(France) Éric Prodon	(Portugal) Leonardo Tavares	6–4, 6–4
2009	(Netherlands) Thiemo de Bakker	(Australia) Peter Luczak	6–4, 7–6^{(9–7)}
2008	(France) Mathieu Montcourt	(Italy) Flavio Cipolla	6–2, 6–2
2007	(France) Éric Prodon	(Australia) Peter Luczak	6–7^{(4–7)}, 6–4, 6–4
2006	(Germany) Florian Mayer	(Latvia) Ernests Gulbis	7–6^{(7–4)}, 2–6, 6–3
2005	(Serbia and Montenegro) Boris Pašanski	(Croatia) Roko Karanušić	7–6^{(7–5)}, 4–6, 7–5
2004	(Serbia and Montenegro) Boris Pašanski	(France) Éric Prodon	6–2, 3–6, 6–2
2003	(Sweden) Robin Söderling	(Russia) Igor Andreev	6–4, 6–1
2002	(Finland) Jarkko Nieminen	(France) Richard Gasquet	7–5, 7–6^{(7–2)}
2001	(Finland) Jarkko Nieminen	(Sweden) Mathias Hellström	6–1, 6–0
2000	(Belgium) Johan Van Herck	(France) Olivier Mutis	6–3, 6–2
1999	(Czech Republic) Radomír Vašek	(Austria) Martin Spöttl	7–5, 2–6, 6–0
1998	(Czech Republic) Tomáš Zíb	(Finland) Tommi Lenho	4–6, 6–2, 7–6
1997	(Hungary) Attila Sávolt	(Australia) Todd Larkham	7–5, 6–0
1996	(Hungary) Attila Sávolt	(Spain) Jacobo Díaz	7–6, 1–6, 6–4
1995	(Spain) Galo Blanco	(Sweden) Christian Bergström	6–3, 6–1
1994	(Australia) Brent Larkham	(Spain) Alejo Mancisidor	7–6, 1–6, 6–3
1993	(Norway) Christian Ruud	(Belgium) Xavier Daufresne	6–4, 6–3
1992	(Denmark) Kenneth Carlsen	(Belgium) Bart Wuyts	4–6, 7–6, 7–6
1991	(Italy) Claudio Pistolesi	(Finland) Veli Paloheimo	7–6, 6–4
1990	(Italy) Renzo Furlan	(Spain) Fernando Luna	6–3, 6–3
1989	(Sweden) Lars Jönsson	(Soviet Union) Andres Võsand	7–5, 7–5
1988	(Soviet Union) Andres Võsand	(Sweden) Christer Allgårdh	6–1, 6–1
1987	(Sweden) Magnus Gustafsson	(Sweden) Conny Falk	6–2, 6–4
1986	(Sweden) Christian Bergström	(Italy) Massimo Cierro	4–6, 7–5, 6–4
1985	(Sweden) Jonas Svensson	(Italy) Massimo Cierro	7–5, 7–5
1984	(Italy) Luca Bottazzi	(Sweden) Peter Svensson	6–2, 6–3
1983	(Socialist Federal Republic of Yugoslavia) Marko Ostoja	(United States) Scott Lipton	6–4, 6–2
1982	(Denmark) Peter Bastiansen	(United States) Steve Krulevitz	3–6, 7–5, 6–2

=== Men's doubles ===
Year	Champions	Runners-up	Score
2026	(Netherlands) Jarno Jans (Netherlands) Niels Visker	(France) Matt Ponchet (Denmark) Oskar Brostrøm Poulsen	6–2, 6–1
2025	(Germany) Christoph Negritu (Ukraine) Vladyslav Orlov	(Netherlands) Mats Hermans (Netherlands) Mick Veldheer	7–5, 6–1
2024	(Spain) Íñigo Cervantes (Spain) Daniel Rincón	(Australia) Thomas Fancutt (Denmark) Johannes Ingildsen	6–3, 6–4
2023	(Poland) Szymon Kielan (Poland) Piotr Matuszewski	(Ukraine) Vladyslav Orlov (Australia) Adam Taylor	6–4, 7–6^{(9–7)}
2022	(Austria) Alexander Erler (Austria) Lucas Miedler	(Poland) Karol Drzewiecki (Finland) Patrik Niklas-Salminen	7–6^{(7–3)}, 6–1
2021	(Argentina) Pedro Cachin (Argentina) Facundo Mena	(Brazil) Orlando Luz (Brazil) Felipe Meligeni Alves	7–5, 6–3
2020	Not held		
2019	(Netherlands) Sander Arends (Netherlands) David Pel	(Russia) Ivan Nedelko (Russia) Alexander Zhurbin	6–0, 6–2
2018	(Sweden) Markus Eriksson (Sweden) André Göransson	(Russia) Ivan Gakhov (Russia) Alexander Pavlioutchenkov	6–3, 3–6, [10–7]
2017	(Belgium) Sander Gillé (Belgium) Joran Vliegen	(Mexico) Lucas Gómez (Argentina) Juan Ignacio Londero	6–2, 6–7^{(5–7)}, [10–3]
2016	(Spain) David Pérez Sanz (United States) Max Schnur	(Australia) Steven de Waard (Germany) Andreas Mies	6–4, 6–4
2015	(Brazil) André Ghem (France) Tristan Lamasine	(Finland) Harri Heliövaara (Finland) Patrik Niklas-Salminen	7–6^{(7–5)}, 7–6^{(7–4)}
2014	(Philippines) Ruben Gonzales (United Kingdom) Sean Thornley	(Sweden) Elias Ymer (Russia) Anton Zaitcev	6–7^{(5–7)}, 7–6^{(12–10)}, [10–8]
2013	(Finland) Henri Kontinen (Montenegro) Goran Tošić	(Philippines) Ruben Gonzales (Australia) Chris Letcher	6–4, 6–4
2012	(Austria) Michael Linzer (Austria) Gerald Melzer	(Belgium) Niels Desein (Brazil) André Ghem	6–1, 7–6^{(7–3)}
2011	(France) Jonathan Dasnières de Veigy (France) David Guez	(France) Pierre-Hugues Herbert (France) Nicolas Renavand	5–7, 6–4, [10–5]
2010	(Portugal) João Sousa (Portugal) Leonardo Tavares	(Latvia) Andis Juška (Latvia) Deniss Pavlovs	7–6^{(7–3)}, 7–5
2009	(Australia) Peter Luczak (Kazakhstan) Yuri Schukin	(Italy) Simone Vagnozzi (Italy) Uros Vico	6–1, 6–7^{(6–8)}, [10–4]
2008	(Sweden) Ervin Eleskovic (Sweden) Michael Ryderstedt	(Finland) Harri Heliövaara (Finland) Henri Kontinen	6–3, 6–4
2007	(Sweden) Johan Brunström (Kuwait) Mohammed Ghareeb	(Finland) Jukka Kohtamäki (Finland) Mika Purho	6–2, 7–6^{(7–5)}
2006	(France) Thierry Ascione (France) Édouard Roger-Vasselin	(Finland) Lauri Kiiski (Finland) Tero Vilen	5–7, 6–2, [12–10]
2005	(France) Marc Gicquel (France) Édouard Roger-Vasselin	(Poland) Adam Chadaj (Poland) Filip Urban	6–4, 4–6, 6–1
2004	(Argentina) Andrés Dellatorre (Argentina) Diego Moyano	(Finland) Lassi Ketola (Finland) Tuomas Ketola	6–4, 3–6, 6–4
2003	(Russia) Igor Andreev (Russia) Dmitry Vlasov	(Argentina) Ignacio Hirigoyen (Argentina) Nicolás Todero	7–6^{(7–4)}, 6–1
2002	(United States) Doug Bohaboy (United States) Nick Rainey	(Finland) Tuomas Ketola (Finland) Jarkko Nieminen	6–4, 6–2
2001	(Australia) Stephen Huss (Australia) Lee Pearson	(Finland) Tuomas Ketola (Finland) Jarkko Nieminen	7–5, 6–7^{(5–7)}, 6–4
2000	(Finland) Ville Liukko (Finland) Jarkko Nieminen	(Australia) Steven Randjelovic (Socialist Federal Republic of Yugoslavia) Dušan Vemić	6–0, 4–6, 6–3
1999	(Czech Republic) Petr Dezort (Czech Republic) Radomír Vašek	(Finland) Jarkko Nieminen (Finland) Timo Nieminen	6–1, 6–1
1998	(Sweden) Tobias Hildebrand (Sweden) Fredrik Lovén	(Austria) Julian Knowle (Belgium) Christophe Rochus	7–6, 1–6, 6–0
1997	(France) Cyril Buscaglione (France) Régis Lavergne	(Finland) Tuomas Ketola (Slovenia) Borut Urh	6–4, 6–3
1996	(United States) Donald Johnson (United States) Francisco Montana	(Sweden) Ola Kristiansson (Sweden) Mårten Renström	7–5, 7–6
1995	(Sweden) Thomas Johansson (Sweden) Mårten Renström	(Portugal) Emanuel Couto (Portugal) Bernardo Mota	6–3, 6–3
1994	(Slovakia) Branislav Gálik (Italy) Mario Visconti	(Sweden) Johan Donar (Sweden) Ola Kristiansson	6–4, 3–6, 7–5
1993	(Sweden) David Engel (Sweden) Nicklas Utgren	(Croatia) Saša Hiršzon (Norway) Christian Ruud	6–4, 7–5
1992	(Sweden) Jonas Björkman (Sweden) Johan Donar	(Sweden) Jan Gunnarsson (Denmark) Michael Mortensen	6–4, 6–4
1991	(Spain) Tomás Carbonell (Spain) Marcos Górriz	(South Africa) David Adams (Russia) Andrei Olhovskiy	6–4, 6–2
1990	(Netherlands) Mark Koevermans (Netherlands) Jan Siemerink	(Italy) Massimo Cierro (Sweden) Tobias Svantesson	6–1, 6–2
1989	(Sweden) Peter Svensson (Sweden) Lars-Anders Wahlgren	(Sweden) Christer Allgårdh (Sweden) Tobias Svantesson	7–5, 6–7, 6–3
1988	(Socialist Federal Republic of Yugoslavia) Igor Flego (Netherlands) Mark Koevermans	(Finland) Mika Hedman (Finland) Veli Paloheimo	6–4, 6–1
1987	(Sweden) David Engel (Australia) Des Tyson	(Sweden) Christer Allgårdh (Greece) George Kalovelonis	6–3, 3–6, 6–3
1986	(Soviet Union) Ģirts Dzelde (Soviet Union) Sergey Leonyuk	(Italy) Alessandro de Minicis (Greece) George Kalovelonis	walkover
1985	(Brazil) Dacio Campos (Italy) Alessandro de Minicis	(Brazil) Carlos Kirmayr (Brazil) Luiz Mattar	6–4, 1–6, 6–3
1984	(New Zealand) David Mustard (United Kingdom) Jonathan Smith	(Sweden) Ronnie Båthman (Italy) Luca Bottazzi	6–3, 6–4
1983	(Denmark) Peter Bastiansen (Denmark) Michael Mortensen	(United States) Mike Barr (Socialist Federal Republic of Yugoslavia) Marko Ostoja	6–4, 6–1
1982	(Sweden) Magnus Tideman (Sweden) Jörgen Windahl	(Czech Republic) Stanislav Birner (Paraguay) Francisco González	6–4, 7–6

=== Women's singles ===
Year	Champion	Runner-up	Score
2019	(Finland) Anastasia Kulikova	(Belgium) Victoria Kalaitzis	6–4, 6–7^{(2–7)}, 6–3
2018	(United Kingdom) Francesca Jones	(Serbia) Bojana Marinković	6–2, 7–6^{(7–2)}
2017	(Czech Republic) Monika Kilnarová	(Belgium) Marie Benoît	7–6^{(7–5)}, 6–7^{(5–7)}, 6–4
2016	(Finland) Piia Suomalainen	(Finland) Emma Laine	0–6, 6–2, 6–3
2015	(Hungary) Lilla Barzó	(Denmark) Karen Barbat	6–2, 6–4
2014	(Greece) Maria Sakkari	(Russia) Anastasia Pivovarova	6–4, 7–5
2013	(Denmark) Karen Barbat	(Russia) Liubov Vasilyeva	6–1, 7–6^{(7–5)}
2012	(Sweden) Sandra Roma	(Russia) Alena Tarasova	7–5, 6–2
2011	(Finland) Piia Suomalainen	(Germany) Dinah Pfizenmaier	7–5, 6–0
2010	(France) Alizé Lim	(France) Amandine Hesse	6–4, 6–3
2009	(Sweden) Sandra Roma	(Belarus) Anna Orlik	6–7^{(2–7)}, 7–6^{(7–3)}, 6–4
2008	(Slovakia) Martina Balogová	(Denmark) Hanne Skak Jensen	6–3, 2–6, 6–0
2007	(Latvia) Alise Vaidere	(Denmark) Hanne Skak Jensen	6–4, 6–1

=== Women's doubles ===
Year	Champions	Runners-up	Score
2019	(Russia) Polina Bakhmutkina (Russia) Noel Saidenova	(Australia) Isabella Bozicevic (Finland) Anastasia Kulikova	6–2, 6–3
2018	(Paraguay) Camila Giangreco Campiz (Serbia) Bojana Marinković	(Russia) Polina Bakhmutkina (Estonia) Elena Malõgina	1–6, 6–4, [10–7]
2017	(Russia) Anna Iakovleva (Ukraine) Gyulnara Nazarova	(Belgium) Marie Benoît (France) Estelle Cascino	walkover
2016	(Finland) Emma Laine (Germany) Julia Wachaczyk	(Finland) Mia Eklund (Germany) Katharina Hering	6–2, 6–3
2015	(Germany) Nora Niedmers (Belgium) Hélène Scholsen	(Romania) Cristina Ene (Bosnia and Herzegovina) Dea Herdželaš	6–4, 7–6^{(7–5)}
2014	(Australia) Alexandra Nancarrow (Greece) Maria Sakkari	(Finland) Emma Laine (Russia) Anastasia Pivovarova	6–2, 6–3
2013	(Germany) Julia Wachaczyk (Germany) Nina Zander	(Finland) Emma Laine (Finland) Piia Suomalainen	6–4, 6–4
2012	(Poland) Olga Brózda (Netherlands) Anouk Tigu	(Czech Republic) Nikola Horáková (Russia) Julia Valetova	6–4, 6–3
2011	(Finland) Leia Kaukonen (Russia) Polina Vinogradova	(Russia) Yanina Darishina (Russia) Liubov Vasilyeva	7–5, 7–6^{(8–6)}
2010	(Latvia) Irina Kuzmina (Latvia) Diāna Marcinkēviča	(France) Amandine Hesse (Czech Republic) Monika Tůmová	6–4, 6–2
2009	(Finland) Emma Laine (Sweden) Sandra Roma	(France) Alizé Lim (Italy) Vivienne Vierin	6–4, 6–3
2008	(Sweden) Diana Eriksson (Denmark) Hanne Skak Jensen	(Sweden) Annie Göransson (Sweden) Caroline Magnusson	6–4, 6–0
2007	(Finland) Piia Suomalainen (Finland) Katariina Tuohimaa	(Denmark) Hanne Skak Jensen (Netherlands) Marcella Koek	6–2, 6–4
