= Éric Prodon =

French tennis player (born 1981)

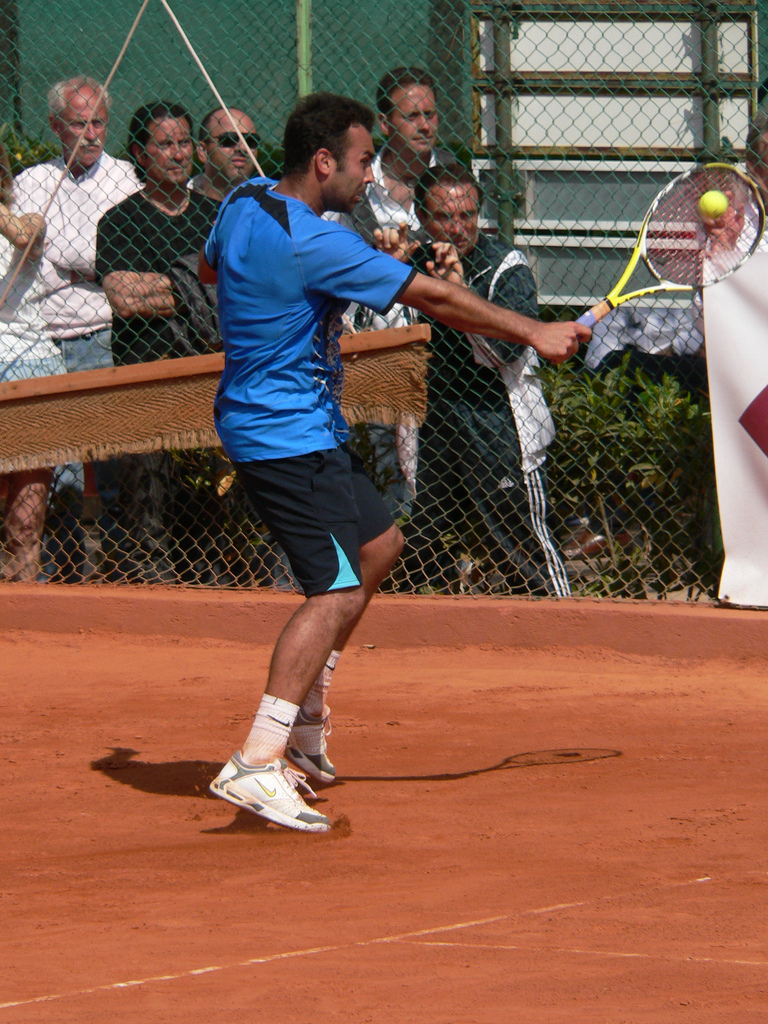
- Country (sports): France
- Residence: Tampere, Finland
- Born: 27 June 1981 (age 45) Paris, France
- Height: 1.77 m (5 ft 10 in)
- Turned pro: 2000
- Retired: 2014
- Plays: Right-handed (one-handed backhand)

Singles
- Career record: 1–19
- Career titles: 0
- Highest ranking: No. 83 (22 August 2011)

Grand Slam singles results
- Australian Open: 1R (2012)
- French Open: 1R (2000, 2002, 2008, 2011, 2012)
- Wimbledon: Q1 (2010, 2014)
- US Open: 1R (2011)

Doubles
- Career record: 0–3
- Career titles: 0
- Highest ranking: No. 580 (4 October 2004)
- Last updated on: 3 October 2008.

Éric Prodon (born 27 June 1981) is a former French professional tennis player.

== Juniors career ==
Prodon had a long career in Juniors, playing from 1997 to 1999 and reaching year-end No. 28 in 1998. In matches against future top pros, he beat Mikhail Youzhny and Julien Benneteau in 1997. Early in 1998, he lost to Jarkko Nieminen, and late in the year, he beat Roger Federer, Karol Beck, and Guillermo Coria in successive rounds at Eddie Herr before losing to David Nalbandian in the final. He then beat Youzhny again after that in the Orange Bowl. Early in 1999, he had a great Australian hard court run, beating Nieminen and splitting matches with Kristian Pless in finals two weeks in a row. In March 1999, he lost to Coria and Paul-Henri Mathieu in successive finals. In May, he lost to Nieminen again, but beat him and Karol Beck the next week in the French Open before losing again to Nalbandian in the quarters. In June in England on the grass, he lost to Mardy Fish in a final. In the summer, back on clay, he beat Tommy Robredo and Boris Pašanski but lost to Igor Kunitsyn. And finally in his next to last match as a junior, he lost to Danai Udomchoke in September in Canada.

== Professional career ==
=== 2000 to 2006 ===
Prodon's transition to the pro tour was a rocky one. While he first entered the top-300 in late 2000 as a 19-year-old, he spent most of 2001 in the 300's before getting back down into the 230's late in 2002.

Despite recording his first (and only) tour level match win against Ruben Ramirez Hidalgo at Casablanca in 2003, his ranking faded again to the 300's in 2003 and 2004 before improving to the 230's again in late 2004 and early 2005, but an injury in February kept him out for 7 months. Another injury in April 2006 kept him off the court the rest of the year. So he spent most of 2005 and 2006 ranked outside the top-500.

=== 2007: A breakthrough year ===
Prodon returned to the tour in mid-February 2007, ranked #683, and won Italy F1 in his first tournament back from a 10-month layoff. His ranking continued to slip, despite some Futures success, and by the time he got to Scotland for a Futures tournament in May, he was #721.

But he then went on a tear on the Futures circuit, winning 4 of 7 titles and finishing as the runner-up in the other three while touring Scotland, Algeria, Poland, Belarus, and France, compiling a 32–3 match record during that stretch, to improve his ranking to #290 by mid-July.

He followed that up with a Challenger championship in Finland, beating #116 Raemon Sluiter and #100 Peter Luczak to reach a career-high ranking of #226. In August, he made two straight Challenger finals in Italy and Germany to break into the top-200 for the first time and reach #165, beating #250 Davide Sanguinetti, #117 Boris Pašanski, and #136 Bohdan Ulihrach while losing to #116 Jiří Vaněk and #289 Ivo Minář.

The rest of his year was a bust, going just 2–7 in Challengers, with a win over #657 Martin Verkerk and 2 straight losses to #224 Thomaz Bellucci, as well as losses to No. 90 Luczak and #113 Fabio Fognini to end the year ranked at career-high of #158 at the age of 26.

=== 2008 ===
Prodon continued to be injury-free and making some progress in early 2008. He started the year winning a Challenger in Miami, beating wild card Jan-Michael Gambill along the way. Then he tried and failed to qualify into 3 consecutive ATP stops in Brazil, Argentina and Mexico, losing to No. 60 Óscar Hernández, No. 95 Nicolás Lapentti, and #157 Daniel Gimeno-Traver. He struggle in his return to Challengers in March and April, winning just 1 of 4 matches while losing to #125 Flavio Cipolla and twice to #165 Christophe Rochus. But he regained his form again, reaching two Challenger finals and a semifinal in April and May, beating #127 Iván Navarro Pastor while losing to #107 Eduardo Schwank, #130 Alberto Martín, #199 Younes El Aynaoui on the comeback trail, and #119 Daniel Gimeno-Traver again. That got his ranking to a career-high of #115.

In May, Prodon was given a Wild Card entry into the 2008 French Open.

=== 2011 ===
He declined to participate at the ATP Challenger Tour Finals.

== ATP titles (7) ==
=== Singles (7) ===
Legend Grand Slam (0) Tennis Masters Cup (0) ATP Masters Series (0) ATP Tour (0) Challengers (7)	Titles by surface Hard (0) Grass (0) Clay (7) Carpet (0)

No.	Date	Tournament	Surface	Opponent	Score
1.	30 July 2007	Tampere, Finland	Clay	(Australia) Peter Luczak	6–7^{(4–7)}, 6–4, 6–4
2.	14 January 2008	Miami, USA	Clay	(Spain) Adrián Menéndez-Maceiras	6–4, 6–4
3.	26 July 2010	Tampere, Finland	Clay	(Portugal) Leonardo Tavares	6–4, 6–4
4.	12 September 2010	Braşov, Romania	Clay	(Czech Republic) Jaroslav Pospíšil	7–6^{(7–1)}, 6–3
5.	30 January 2011	Bucaramanga, Colombia	Clay	(Brazil) Fernando Romboli	6–3, 4–6, 6–1
6.	17 July 2011	Sopot, Poland	Clay	(Serbia) Nikola Ćirić	6–1, 6–3
7.	31 July 2011	Tampere, Finland	Clay	(France) Augustin Gensse	6–1, 3–6, 6–2

== Runners-up (8) ==
=== Singles (8) ===
Legend Grand Slam (0) Tennis Masters Cup (0) ATP Masters Series (0) ATP Tour (0) Challengers (8)	Finals by surface Hard (0) Grass (0) Clay (8) Carpet (0)

No.	Date	Tournament	Surface	Opponent	Score
1.	19 July 2004	Tampere, Finland	Clay	(Serbia and Montenegro) Boris Pašanski	6–2, 3–6, 6–2
2.	20 August 2007	Manerbio, Italy	Clay	(Czech Republic) Jiří Vaněk	6–0, 6–4
3.	27 August 2007	Freudenstadt, Germany	Clay	(Czech Republic) Ivo Minář	7–5, 6–3
4.	28 April 2008	Rome, Italy	Clay	(Argentina) Eduardo Schwank	6–3, 6–7^{(2–7)}, 7–6^{(7–3)}
5.	12 May 2008	Aarhus, Denmark	Clay	(Spain) Daniel Gimeno-Traver	7–5, 7–5
6.	13 March 2011	Santiago, Chile	Clay	(Argentina) Máximo González	7–5, 0–6, 6–2
7.	19 September 2011	Szczecin, Poland	Clay	(Portugal) Rui Machado	2–6, 7–5, 6–2
8.	29 July 2012	Tampere, Finland	Clay	(Portugal) João Sousa	6–7^{(5–7)}, 4–6

== Singles performance timeline ==
Key
W	F	SF	QF	#R	RR	Q#	DNQ	A	NH

(W) winner; (F) finalist; (SF) semifinalist; (QF) quarterfinalist; (#R) rounds 4, 3, 2, 1; (RR) round-robin stage; (Q#) qualification round; (DNQ) did not qualify; (A) absent; (NH) not held; (SR) strike rate (events won / competed); (W–L) win–loss record.

Tournament	2000	2001	2002	2003	2004	2005	2006	2007	2008	2009	2010	2011	2012	W–L
Grand Slam tournaments
Australian Open	A	A	A	A	A	A	A	A	A	Q2	A	A	1R	0–1
French Open	1R	A	1R	A	A	A	A	A	1R	Q2	Q1	1R	1R	0–5
Wimbledon	A	A	A	A	A	A	A	A	A	A	Q1	A		0–0
US Open	A	A	A	A	A	A	A	A	A	A	A	1R		0–1
Win–loss	0–1	0–0	0–1	0–0	0–0	0–0	0–0	0–0	0–1	0–0	0–0	0–2	0–2	0–7
Career statistics
Titles–Finals	0–0	0–0	0–0	0–0	0–0	0–0	0–0	0–0	0–0	0–0	0–0	0–0	0–0	0–0
Year-end ranking	294	316	235	325	243	630	633	158	168	284	145	97		
