= 2017 ITF Men's Circuit (January–March) =

The 2017 ITF Men's Circuit is the 2017 edition of the second-tier tour for men's professional tennis. It is organised by the International Tennis Federation and is a tier below the ATP Tour. The ITF Men's Circuit includes tournaments with prize money ranging from $15,000 up to $25,000.

== Key ==
$25,000 tournaments
$15,000 tournaments

== Month ==
=== January ===
Week of	Tournament	Winner	Runners-up	Semifinalists	Quarterfinalists
January 2	USA F1 Futures; Los Angeles, United States; Hard $25,000; Singles and doubles draws	(United States) Mackenzie McDonald; 6–4, 6–0	(Sweden) Carl Söderlund	(United States) Evan King (Germany) Yannick Hanfmann	(United States) Collin Altamirano (Ecuador) Emilio Gómez (Germany) Sebastian Fanselow (Ecuador) Roberto Quiroz
January 2	USA F1 Futures; Los Angeles, United States; Hard $25,000; Singles and doubles draws	(Germany) Yannick Hanfmann (Ecuador) Roberto Quiroz; 3–6, 6–4, [10–8]	(United Kingdom) Luke Bambridge (United Kingdom) Joe Salisbury	(United States) Evan King (Germany) Yannick Hanfmann	(United States) Collin Altamirano (Ecuador) Emilio Gómez (Germany) Sebastian Fanselow (Ecuador) Roberto Quiroz
January 2	Hong Kong F6 Futures; Hong Kong, China; Hard $15,000; Singles and doubles draws	(China) Bai Yan; 6–1, 6–4	(Japan) Takuto Niki	(Chinese Taipei) Yu Cheng-yu (France) Geoffrey Blancaneaux	(Hong Kong) Anthony Jackie Tang (Japan) Masato Shiga (Japan) Jumpei Yamasaki (Japan) Ken Onishi
January 2	Hong Kong F6 Futures; Hong Kong, China; Hard $15,000; Singles and doubles draws	(France) Geoffrey Blancaneaux (Japan) Takuto Niki; 7–6^{(8–6)}, 6–0	(Hong Kong) Karan Rastogi (Hong Kong) Wong Chun-hun	(Chinese Taipei) Yu Cheng-yu (France) Geoffrey Blancaneaux	(Hong Kong) Anthony Jackie Tang (Japan) Masato Shiga (Japan) Jumpei Yamasaki (Japan) Ken Onishi
January 9	USA F2 Futures; Long Beach, United States; Hard $25,000; Singles and doubles draws	(United States) Marcos Giron; 7–6^{(7–3)}, 6–1	(United States) Collin Altamirano	(Sweden) Carl Söderlund (Germany) Sebastian Fanselow	(United States) Tommy Paul (United States) Mackenzie McDonald (United States) Evan King (United States) Henry Craig
January 9	USA F2 Futures; Long Beach, United States; Hard $25,000; Singles and doubles draws	(United States) Austin Krajicek (United States) Jackson Withrow; 6–3, 3–6, [10–8]	(United Kingdom) Luke Bambridge (United Kingdom) Joe Salisbury	(Sweden) Carl Söderlund (Germany) Sebastian Fanselow	(United States) Tommy Paul (United States) Mackenzie McDonald (United States) Evan King (United States) Henry Craig
January 9	France F1 Futures; Bagnoles-de-l'Orne, France; Hard $15,000+H; Singles and doubles draws	(France) Maxime Hamou; 3–6, 6–4, 6–3	(France) Constant Lestienne	(Russia) Alexey Vatutin (France) Jules Marie	(France) Romain Jouan (France) Gleb Sakharov (France) Evan Furness (France) Maxime Janvier
January 9	France F1 Futures; Bagnoles-de-l'Orne, France; Hard $15,000+H; Singles and doubles draws	(France) Constant Lestienne (France) Alexis Musialek; 3–6, 7–5, [10–8]	(France) Grégoire Jacq (France) Hugo Nys	(Russia) Alexey Vatutin (France) Jules Marie	(France) Romain Jouan (France) Gleb Sakharov (France) Evan Furness (France) Maxime Janvier
January 9	Germany F1 Futures; Schwieberdingen, Germany; Carpet $15,000; Singles and doubles draws	(Russia) Evgeny Karlovskiy; 2–6, 6–4, 6–4	(Belarus) Yaraslav Shyla	(Czech Republic) Petr Michnev (Belarus) Dzmitry Zhyrmont	(Sweden) Isak Arvidsson (Germany) Jan Choinski (United Kingdom) Neil Pauffley (Germany) Oscar Otte
January 9	Germany F1 Futures; Schwieberdingen, Germany; Carpet $15,000; Singles and doubles draws	(Sweden) Isak Arvidsson (Sweden) Patrik Rosenholm; 7–6^{(7–5)}, 3–6, [10–8]	(Russia) Evgeny Karlovskiy (Belarus) Yaraslav Shyla	(Czech Republic) Petr Michnev (Belarus) Dzmitry Zhyrmont	(Sweden) Isak Arvidsson (Germany) Jan Choinski (United Kingdom) Neil Pauffley (Germany) Oscar Otte
January 9	Tunisia F1 Futures; Hammamet, Tunisia; Clay $15,000; Singles and doubles draws	(Hungary) Attila Balázs; 6–3, 6–1	(Russia) Ivan Nedelko	(Portugal) Gonçalo Oliveira (France) Benjamin Bonzi	(Italy) Fabrizio Ornago (France) Baptiste Crepatte (Germany) Paul Wörner (Spain) Pol Toledo Bagué
January 9	Tunisia F1 Futures; Hammamet, Tunisia; Clay $15,000; Singles and doubles draws	(Italy) Marco Bortolotti (Italy) Tommaso Gabrieli; 6–4, 6–3	(Romania) Sorin Andrei Iordache (Romania) Călin Manda	(Portugal) Gonçalo Oliveira (France) Benjamin Bonzi	(Italy) Fabrizio Ornago (France) Baptiste Crepatte (Germany) Paul Wörner (Spain) Pol Toledo Bagué
January 9	Turkey F1 Futures; Antalya, Turkey; Hard $15,000; Singles and doubles draws	(Poland) Kamil Majchrzak; 5–7, 6–3, 6–3	(United Kingdom) Liam Broady	(Bulgaria) Alexandar Lazov (Netherlands) Tallon Griekspoor	(Germany) Marc Sieber (Germany) Christian Hirschmüller (Turkey) Altuğ Çelikbilek (Russia) Anton Zaitcev
January 9	Turkey F1 Futures; Antalya, Turkey; Hard $15,000; Singles and doubles draws	(Norway) Viktor Durasovic (Croatia) Nino Serdarušić; 6–3, 6–3	(United Kingdom) Liam Broady (United Kingdom) Luke Johnson	(Bulgaria) Alexandar Lazov (Netherlands) Tallon Griekspoor	(Germany) Marc Sieber (Germany) Christian Hirschmüller (Turkey) Altuğ Çelikbilek (Russia) Anton Zaitcev
January 9	USA F3 Futures; Plantation, United States; Clay $15,000; Singles and doubles draws	(Dominican Republic) Roberto Cid Subervi; 6–7^{(4–7)}, 7–6^{(7–3)}, 6–0	(Canada) Félix Auger-Aliassime	(Hungary) Péter Nagy (Spain) Miguel Semmler	(Venezuela) Ricardo Rodríguez (Canada) Filip Peliwo (Ecuador) Iván Endara (Austria) Bastian Trinker
January 9	USA F3 Futures; Plantation, United States; Clay $15,000; Singles and doubles draws	(Bosnia and Herzegovina) Tomislav Brkić (Serbia) Nikola Ćaćić; 4–6, 6–1, [10–3]	(Spain) Jaume Pla Malfeito (Spain) Miguel Semmler	(Hungary) Péter Nagy (Spain) Miguel Semmler	(Venezuela) Ricardo Rodríguez (Canada) Filip Peliwo (Ecuador) Iván Endara (Austria) Bastian Trinker
January 16	Egypt F1 Futures; Sharm El Sheikh, Egypt; Hard $15,000; Singles and doubles draws	(Bosnia and Herzegovina) Aldin Šetkić; 6–3, 7–5	(Egypt) Karim-Mohamed Maamoun	(France) Jules Okala (Switzerland) Adrian Bodmer	(France) Antoine Escoffier (France) Alexandre Müller (Spain) Pablo Vivero González (Portugal) Frederico Ferreira Silva
January 16	Egypt F1 Futures; Sharm El Sheikh, Egypt; Hard $15,000; Singles and doubles draws	(France) Antoine Escoffier (France) Alexandre Müller; 6–2, 3–6, [11–9]	(Switzerland) Adrian Bodmer (Germany) Jakob Sude	(France) Jules Okala (Switzerland) Adrian Bodmer	(France) Antoine Escoffier (France) Alexandre Müller (Spain) Pablo Vivero González (Portugal) Frederico Ferreira Silva
January 16	France F2 Futures; Bressuire, France; Hard $15,000+H; Singles and doubles draws	(France) Gleb Sakharov; 6–3, 6–3	(France) Grégoire Jacq	(France) Rémi Boutillier (France) Yannick Jankovits	(Italy) Salvatore Caruso (Belgium) Clément Geens (France) Hugo Nys (France) Romain Jouan
January 16	France F2 Futures; Bressuire, France; Hard $15,000+H; Singles and doubles draws	(France) Corentin Denolly (France) Hugo Nys; 6–4, 6–2	(Croatia) Ante Pavić (South Africa) Ruan Roelofse	(France) Rémi Boutillier (France) Yannick Jankovits	(Italy) Salvatore Caruso (Belgium) Clément Geens (France) Hugo Nys (France) Romain Jouan
January 16	Germany F2 Futures; Kaarst, Germany; Carpet $15,000; Singles and doubles draws	(Germany) Elmar Ejupovic; 7–6^{(7–4)}, 6–7^{(3–7)}, 6–4	(Germany) Oscar Otte	(Ukraine) Vadym Ursu (Belarus) Yaraslav Shyla	(Estonia) Vladimir Ivanov (Germany) Vincent Jänsch-Müller (Belgium) Yannick Vandenbulcke (Germany) Mats Moraing
January 16	Germany F2 Futures; Kaarst, Germany; Carpet $15,000; Singles and doubles draws	(Germany) Jannis Kahlke (Germany) Oscar Otte; 6–3, 5–7, [10–8]	(Netherlands) David Pel (Belgium) Joran Vliegen	(Ukraine) Vadym Ursu (Belarus) Yaraslav Shyla	(Estonia) Vladimir Ivanov (Germany) Vincent Jänsch-Müller (Belgium) Yannick Vandenbulcke (Germany) Mats Moraing
January 16	Spain F1 Futures; Manacor, Spain; Clay $15,000; Singles and doubles draws	(Spain) Jaume Munar; 6–3, 6–3	(Spain) Ricardo Ojeda Lara	(Spain) Pedro Martínez (Spain) Álvaro López San Martín	(Italy) Omar Giacalone (Argentina) Pedro Cachin (France) Maxime Chazal (Spain) Bernabé Zapata Miralles
January 16	Spain F1 Futures; Manacor, Spain; Clay $15,000; Singles and doubles draws	(Spain) Pedro Martínez (Spain) Ricardo Ojeda Lara; 6–7^{(5–7)}, 6–0, [10–4]	(Spain) Sergio Martos Gornés (Spain) David Vega Hernández	(Spain) Pedro Martínez (Spain) Álvaro López San Martín	(Italy) Omar Giacalone (Argentina) Pedro Cachin (France) Maxime Chazal (Spain) Bernabé Zapata Miralles
January 16	Tunisia F2 Futures; Hammamet, Tunisia; Clay $15,000; Singles and doubles draws	(Portugal) João Domingues; 2–6, 6–4, 6–3	(Portugal) Gonçalo Oliveira	(Spain) Oriol Roca Batalla (Hungary) Attila Balázs	(Chile) Laslo Urrutia Fuentes (Spain) Marc Giner (France) Baptiste Crepatte (Italy) Nicola Ghedin
January 16	Tunisia F2 Futures; Hammamet, Tunisia; Clay $15,000; Singles and doubles draws	(France) Jordan Ubiergo (France) Thibault Venturino; 7–5, 6–1	(France) Benjamin Bonzi (France) Johan Tatlot	(Spain) Oriol Roca Batalla (Hungary) Attila Balázs	(Chile) Laslo Urrutia Fuentes (Spain) Marc Giner (France) Baptiste Crepatte (Italy) Nicola Ghedin
January 16	Turkey F2 Futures; Antalya, Turkey; Hard $15,000; Singles and doubles draws	(Bulgaria) Alexandar Lazov; 6–4, 2–6, 7–6^{(7–5)}	(Netherlands) Tallon Griekspoor	(Czech Republic) Michal Konečný (United Kingdom) Liam Broady	(Netherlands) Miliaan Niesten (Croatia) Mate Delić (Turkey) Muhammet Haylaz (Germany) Marc Sieber
January 16	Turkey F2 Futures; Antalya, Turkey; Hard $15,000; Singles and doubles draws	(Serbia) Petar Čonkić (Serbia) Goran Marković; 2–6, 7–6^{(8–6)}, [10–3]	(Netherlands) Sidney de Boer (Netherlands) Tallon Griekspoor	(Czech Republic) Michal Konečný (United Kingdom) Liam Broady	(Netherlands) Miliaan Niesten (Croatia) Mate Delić (Turkey) Muhammet Haylaz (Germany) Marc Sieber
January 16	USA F4 Futures; Sunrise, United States; Clay $15,000; Singles and doubles draws	(Serbia) Miomir Kecmanović; 6–2, 6–2	(Sweden) Christian Lindell	(United States) Patrick Kypson (Hungary) Péter Nagy	(Dominican Republic) Roberto Cid Subervi (Canada) Brayden Schnur (Canada) Filip Peliwo (Ecuador) Gonzalo Escobar
January 16	USA F4 Futures; Sunrise, United States; Clay $15,000; Singles and doubles draws	(Germany) Peter Torebko (Austria) Bastian Trinker; 7–6^{(7–3)}, 4–6, [10–7]	(Bosnia and Herzegovina) Tomislav Brkić (Serbia) Nikola Ćaćić	(United States) Patrick Kypson (Hungary) Péter Nagy	(Dominican Republic) Roberto Cid Subervi (Canada) Brayden Schnur (Canada) Filip Peliwo (Ecuador) Gonzalo Escobar
January 23	Germany F3 Futures; Nußloch, Germany; Carpet $25,000; Singles and doubles draw	(Germany) Mats Moraing; 7–6^{(7–5)}, 7–6^{(7–5)}	(Germany) Daniel Masur	(Germany) Marvin Netuschil (Russia) Alexey Vatutin	(Germany) Oscar Otte (Germany) Daniel Altmaier (Germany) Robin Kern (Germany) Jan Choinski
January 23	Germany F3 Futures; Nußloch, Germany; Carpet $25,000; Singles and doubles draw	(Germany) Andreas Mies (Germany) Oscar Otte; 6–3, 6–0	(Poland) Mateusz Kowalczyk (Poland) Grzegorz Panfil	(Germany) Marvin Netuschil (Russia) Alexey Vatutin	(Germany) Oscar Otte (Germany) Daniel Altmaier (Germany) Robin Kern (Germany) Jan Choinski
January 23	Kazakhstan F1 Futures; Aktobe, Kazakhstan; Hard (indoor) $25,000; Singles and doubles draws	(Czech Republic) Václav Šafránek; 7–6^{(7–5)}, 7–6^{(7–2)}	(Ukraine) Vladyslav Manafov	(Italy) Lorenzo Giustino (Czech Republic) Robin Staněk	(Uzbekistan) Sanjar Fayziev (Serbia) Danilo Petrović (Austria) David Pichler (Czech Republic) Jan Mertl
January 23	Kazakhstan F1 Futures; Aktobe, Kazakhstan; Hard (indoor) $25,000; Singles and doubles draws	(Ukraine) Vladyslav Manafov (Russia) Alexander Pavlioutchenkov; 6–3, 7–6^{(9–7)}	(Uzbekistan) Sanjar Fayziev (Kazakhstan) Timur Khabibulin	(Italy) Lorenzo Giustino (Czech Republic) Robin Staněk	(Uzbekistan) Sanjar Fayziev (Serbia) Danilo Petrović (Austria) David Pichler (Czech Republic) Jan Mertl
January 23	Egypt F2 Futures; Sharm El Sheikh, Egypt; Hard $15,000; Singles and doubles draws	(Belgium) Romain Barbosa; 7–6^{(7–1)}, 6–4	(France) Jules Okala	(Bosnia and Herzegovina) Aldin Šetkić (Egypt) Karim-Mohamed Maamoun	(Italy) Riccardo Bonadio (Estonia) Vladimir Ivanov (Spain) Pablo Vivero González (Czech Republic) Libor Salaba
January 23	Egypt F2 Futures; Sharm El Sheikh, Egypt; Hard $15,000; Singles and doubles draws	(Czech Republic) Petr Hájek (Ukraine) Danill Zarichanskyy; 5–7, 6–3, [10–3]	(Italy) Riccardo Bonadio (Egypt) Karim-Mohamed Maamoun	(Bosnia and Herzegovina) Aldin Šetkić (Egypt) Karim-Mohamed Maamoun	(Italy) Riccardo Bonadio (Estonia) Vladimir Ivanov (Spain) Pablo Vivero González (Czech Republic) Libor Salaba
January 23	France F3 Futures; Veigy-Foncenex, France; Carpet $15,000; Singles and doubles draws	(France) Hugo Grenier; 6–3, 6–4	(Belgium) Clément Geens	(France) David Guez (Italy) Lorenzo Frigerio	(Latvia) Mārtiņš Podžus (France) Hugo Voljacques (France) Mick Lescure (France) Corentin Denolly
January 23	France F3 Futures; Veigy-Foncenex, France; Carpet $15,000; Singles and doubles draws	(Belgium) Julien Dubail (Belgium) Joran Vliegen; 4–6, 6–4, [10–4]	(Netherlands) Antal van der Duim (Netherlands) Tim van Terheijden	(France) David Guez (Italy) Lorenzo Frigerio	(Latvia) Mārtiņš Podžus (France) Hugo Voljacques (France) Mick Lescure (France) Corentin Denolly
January 23	Spain F2 Futures; Manacor, Spain; Clay $15,000; Singles and doubles draws	(Spain) Ricardo Ojeda Lara; 6–4, 6–3	(Argentina) Pedro Cachin	(France) Maxime Chazal (Spain) Jaume Munar	(Italy) Stefano Travaglia (Spain) Pedro Martínez (Spain) Juan Lizariturry (Spain) Álvaro López San Martín
January 23	Spain F2 Futures; Manacor, Spain; Clay $15,000; Singles and doubles draws	(Italy) Filippo Leonardi (Italy) Stefano Travaglia; 6–3, 6–2	(Romania) Andrei Ștefan Apostol (Romania) Bogdan Borza	(France) Maxime Chazal (Spain) Jaume Munar	(Italy) Stefano Travaglia (Spain) Pedro Martínez (Spain) Juan Lizariturry (Spain) Álvaro López San Martín
January 23	Tunisia F3 Futures; Hammamet, Tunisia; Hard $15,000; Singles and doubles draws	(Portugal) João Domingues; 6–4, 3–6, 6–1	(Italy) Marco Bortolotti	(Montenegro) Ljubomir Čelebić (Spain) Carlos Taberner	(Portugal) Pedro Sousa (Russia) Ivan Nedelko (Portugal) Gonçalo Oliveira (Spain) Oriol Roca Batalla
January 23	Tunisia F3 Futures; Hammamet, Tunisia; Hard $15,000; Singles and doubles draws	(Montenegro) Ljubomir Čelebić (Montenegro) Rrezart Cungu; 6–4, 6–3	(Spain) Oriol Roca Batalla (Netherlands) Mark Vervoort	(Montenegro) Ljubomir Čelebić (Spain) Carlos Taberner	(Portugal) Pedro Sousa (Russia) Ivan Nedelko (Portugal) Gonçalo Oliveira (Spain) Oriol Roca Batalla
January 23	Turkey F3 Futures; Antalya, Turkey; Hard $15,000; Singles and doubles draws	(Turkey) Cem İlkel; 6–4, 1–0 ret.	(Netherlands) Tallon Griekspoor	(Bulgaria) Alexandar Lazov (Czech Republic) Michal Konečný	(Turkey) Altuğ Çelikbilek (Ukraine) Vadim Alekseenko (United States) Peter Kobelt (Germany) Marc Sieber
January 23	Turkey F3 Futures; Antalya, Turkey; Hard $15,000; Singles and doubles draws	(Romania) Victor Vlad Cornea (Croatia) Nino Serdarušić; 6–3, 6–1	(Ukraine) Vadim Alekseenko (Colombia) Felipe Mantilla	(Bulgaria) Alexandar Lazov (Czech Republic) Michal Konečný	(Turkey) Altuğ Çelikbilek (Ukraine) Vadim Alekseenko (United States) Peter Kobelt (Germany) Marc Sieber
January 23	USA F5 Futures; Weston, United States; Clay $15,000; Singles and doubles draws	(Bolivia) Hugo Dellien; 6–2, 7–5	(Germany) Dominik Köpfer	(Canada) Félix Auger-Aliassime (Sweden) Christian Lindell	(Argentina) Tomás Lipovšek Puches (Peru) Juan Pablo Varillas (United States) Sebastian Korda (Argentina) Juan Ignacio Londero
January 23	USA F5 Futures; Weston, United States; Clay $15,000; Singles and doubles draws	(Argentina) Facundo Argüello (Argentina) Juan Ignacio Londero; 6–4, 6–7^{(1–7)}, [14–12]	(Ecuador) Gonzalo Escobar (Venezuela) Luis David Martínez	(Canada) Félix Auger-Aliassime (Sweden) Christian Lindell	(Argentina) Tomás Lipovšek Puches (Peru) Juan Pablo Varillas (United States) Sebastian Korda (Argentina) Juan Ignacio Londero
January 30	Kazakhstan F2 Futures; Aktobe, Kazakhstan; Hard (indoor) $25,000; Singles and doubles draw	(Serbia) Danilo Petrović; 6–1, 6–7^{(2–7)}, 6–3	(Poland) Andriej Kapaś	(Czech Republic) Jan Mertl (Ukraine) Vladyslav Manafov	(Russia) Denis Matsukevich (Netherlands) Botic van de Zandschulp (Austria) Maximilian Neuchrist (Czech Republic) Václav Šafránek
January 30	Kazakhstan F2 Futures; Aktobe, Kazakhstan; Hard (indoor) $25,000; Singles and doubles draw	(Netherlands) Niels Lootsma (Netherlands) Botic van de Zandschulp; 6–4, 6–4	(Ukraine) Vladyslav Manafov (Russia) Alexander Pavlioutchenkov	(Czech Republic) Jan Mertl (Ukraine) Vladyslav Manafov	(Russia) Denis Matsukevich (Netherlands) Botic van de Zandschulp (Austria) Maximilian Neuchrist (Czech Republic) Václav Šafránek
January 30	Egypt F3 Futures; Sharm El Sheikh, Egypt; Hard $15,000; Singles and doubles draw	(Egypt) Karim-Mohamed Maamoun; 6–2, 7–6^{(7–1)}	(Bosnia and Herzegovina) Aldin Šetkić	(Spain) Nicola Kuhn (Spain) Pablo Vivero González	(Czech Republic) Vít Kopřiva (Italy) Lorenzo Frigerio (France) Antoine Escoffier (Italy) Riccardo Bonadio
January 30	Egypt F3 Futures; Sharm El Sheikh, Egypt; Hard $15,000; Singles and doubles draw	(Egypt) Issam Haitham Taweel (Egypt) Sherif Sabry; Walkover	(Italy) Riccardo Bonadio (Italy) Lorenzo Frigerio	(Spain) Nicola Kuhn (Spain) Pablo Vivero González	(Czech Republic) Vít Kopřiva (Italy) Lorenzo Frigerio (France) Antoine Escoffier (Italy) Riccardo Bonadio
January 30	Great Britain F1 Futures; Glasgow, Great Britain; Hard (indoor) $15,000; Singles and doubles draws	(Slovakia) Filip Horanský; 6–2, 6–3	(France) Hugo Grenier	(United Kingdom) Jay Clarke (Belgium) Niels Desein	(United Kingdom) Jonathan Gray (United Kingdom) Jonny O'Mara (Belgium) Yannick Vandenbulcke (France) Yannick Jankovits
January 30	Great Britain F1 Futures; Glasgow, Great Britain; Hard (indoor) $15,000; Singles and doubles draws	(Belgium) Niels Desein (France) Mick Lescure; 4–6, 6–4, [10–7]	(United Kingdom) Farris Fathi Gosea (United States) Tim Kopinski	(United Kingdom) Jay Clarke (Belgium) Niels Desein	(United Kingdom) Jonathan Gray (United Kingdom) Jonny O'Mara (Belgium) Yannick Vandenbulcke (France) Yannick Jankovits
January 30	Spain F3 Futures; Paguera, Spain; Clay $15,000; Singles and doubles draws	(Italy) Stefano Travaglia; 7–5, 6–1	(Spain) Pedro Martínez	(Spain) Ricardo Ojeda Lara (Spain) David Vega Hernández	(United Kingdom) Alexander Ward (Spain) Gerard Granollers (Argentina) Pedro Cachin (Germany) Pascal Meis
January 30	Spain F3 Futures; Paguera, Spain; Clay $15,000; Singles and doubles draws	(Spain) Gerard Granollers (Spain) Pedro Martínez; 6–1, 6–3	(Italy) Filippo Leonardi (Italy) Stefano Travaglia	(Spain) Ricardo Ojeda Lara (Spain) David Vega Hernández	(United Kingdom) Alexander Ward (Spain) Gerard Granollers (Argentina) Pedro Cachin (Germany) Pascal Meis
January 30	Tunisia F4 Futures; Hammamet, Tunisia; Clay $15,000; Singles and doubles draws	(Spain) Marc Giner; 6–1, 6–1	(Croatia) Kristijan Mesaroš	(Spain) Carlos Taberner (Spain) Oriol Roca Batalla	(Russia) Ivan Gakhov (Montenegro) Ljubomir Čelebić (Spain) Paco Climent Gregori (Italy) Walter Trusendi
January 30	Tunisia F4 Futures; Hammamet, Tunisia; Clay $15,000; Singles and doubles draws	(Spain) Oriol Roca Batalla (Netherlands) Mark Vervoort; 6–2, 6–4	(Montenegro) Ljubomir Čelebić (Italy) Davide Melchiorrer	(Spain) Carlos Taberner (Spain) Oriol Roca Batalla	(Russia) Ivan Gakhov (Montenegro) Ljubomir Čelebić (Spain) Paco Climent Gregori (Italy) Walter Trusendi
January 30	Turkey F4 Futures; Antalya, Turkey; Hard $15,000; Singles and doubles draws	(Serbia) Milan Drinić; 2–6, 6–4, 6–4	(United States) Peter Kobelt	(Netherlands) Miliaan Niesten (Russia) Anton Zaitcev	(Austria) Alexander Erler (Colombia) Felipe Mantilla (Romania) Alexandru Jecan (Ukraine) Volodymyr Uzhylovskyi
January 30	Turkey F4 Futures; Antalya, Turkey; Hard $15,000; Singles and doubles draws	(Austria) Alexander Erler (Austria) Sebastian Ofner; 6–2, 3–6, [10–7]	(Russia) Anton Zaitcev (Ukraine) Volodymyr Uzhylovskyi	(Netherlands) Miliaan Niesten (Russia) Anton Zaitcev	(Austria) Alexander Erler (Colombia) Felipe Mantilla (Romania) Alexandru Jecan (Ukraine) Volodymyr Uzhylovskyi
January 30	USA F6 Futures; Palm Coast, United States; Clay $15,000; Singles and doubles draws	(United States) Tommy Paul; 6–3, 4–6, 6–3	(Japan) Renta Tokuda	(Argentina) Facundo Argüello (Canada) Félix Auger-Aliassime	(Hungary) Péter Nagy (Brazil) Fabiano de Paula (Argentina) Genaro Alberto Olivieri (Japan) Naoki Nakagawa
January 30	USA F6 Futures; Palm Coast, United States; Clay $15,000; Singles and doubles draws	(Argentina) Facundo Argüello (Argentina) Juan Ignacio Londero; 6–2, 6–3	(Republic of Ireland) Julian Bradley (United States) Isaiah Strode	(Argentina) Facundo Argüello (Canada) Félix Auger-Aliassime	(Hungary) Péter Nagy (Brazil) Fabiano de Paula (Argentina) Genaro Alberto Olivieri (Japan) Naoki Nakagawa

=== February ===
Week of	Tournament	Winner	Runners-up	Semifinalists	Quarterfinalists
February 6	Switzerland F1 Futures; Oberentfelden, Switzerland; Carpet $25,000; Singles and doubles draw	(Italy) Matteo Berrettini; 6–2, 6–4	(France) Laurent Lokoli	(Germany) Daniel Altmaier (Germany) Sami Reinwein	(Germany) Marvin Netuschil (Netherlands) Niels Lootsma (Germany) Robin Kern (Israel) Edan Leshem
February 6	Switzerland F1 Futures; Oberentfelden, Switzerland; Carpet $25,000; Singles and doubles draw	(Germany) Johannes Härteis (France) Hugo Voljacques; 6–7^{(4–7)}, 6–3, [10–8]	(Poland) Mateusz Kowalczyk (Poland) Grzegorz Panfil	(Germany) Daniel Altmaier (Germany) Sami Reinwein	(Germany) Marvin Netuschil (Netherlands) Niels Lootsma (Germany) Robin Kern (Israel) Edan Leshem
February 6	Egypt F4 Futures; Sharm El Sheikh, Egypt; Hard $15,000; Singles and doubles draws	(Germany) Jonas Lütjen; 7–6^{(7–3)}, 7–5	(France) Gleb Sakharov	(Egypt) Youssef Hossam (South Africa) Lloyd Harris	(Japan) Hiroyasu Ehara (Serbia) Ilija Vučić (Portugal) Frederico Ferreira Silva (Italy) Lorenzo Frigerio
February 6	Egypt F4 Futures; Sharm El Sheikh, Egypt; Hard $15,000; Singles and doubles draws	(Germany) Jonas Lütjen (South Africa) Nicolaas Scholtz; 6–2, 2–6, [11–9]	(Sweden) Markus Eriksson (Sweden) Milos Sekulic	(Egypt) Youssef Hossam (South Africa) Lloyd Harris	(Japan) Hiroyasu Ehara (Serbia) Ilija Vučić (Portugal) Frederico Ferreira Silva (Italy) Lorenzo Frigerio
February 6	Great Britain F2 Futures; Tipton, Great Britain; Hard (indoor) $15,000; Singles and doubles draws	(Germany) Oscar Otte; 7–5, 6–3	(France) David Guez	(Lithuania) Laurynas Grigelis (United Kingdom) Marcus Willis	(United Kingdom) Jay Clarke (United Kingdom) Neil Pauffley (Italy) Erik Crepaldi (Belgium) Clément Geens
February 6	Great Britain F2 Futures; Tipton, Great Britain; Hard (indoor) $15,000; Singles and doubles draws	(Germany) Jannis Kahlke (Germany) Oscar Otte; 5–7, 6–2, [10–5]	(Italy) Andrea Pellegrino (Italy) Andrea Vavassori	(Lithuania) Laurynas Grigelis (United Kingdom) Marcus Willis	(United Kingdom) Jay Clarke (United Kingdom) Neil Pauffley (Italy) Erik Crepaldi (Belgium) Clément Geens
February 6	Indonesia F1 Futures; Jakarta, Indonesia; Hard $15,000; Singles and doubles draws	(Chinese Taipei) Chen Ti; 7–6^{(7–4)}, 6–3	(China) Sun Fajing	(Japan) Kento Takeuchi (India) Karunuday Singh	(France) Arthur Weber (Japan) Shintaro Imai (New Zealand) Finn Tearney (France) Enzo Couacaud
February 6	Indonesia F1 Futures; Jakarta, Indonesia; Hard $15,000; Singles and doubles draws	(Australia) Aaron Addison (United Kingdom) Rhett Purcell; Walkover	(India) Karunuday Singh (Canada) Kelsey Stevenson	(Japan) Kento Takeuchi (India) Karunuday Singh	(France) Arthur Weber (Japan) Shintaro Imai (New Zealand) Finn Tearney (France) Enzo Couacaud
February 6	Spain F4 Futures; Paguera, Spain; Clay $15,000; Singles and doubles draws	(Spain) Jaume Munar; 3–6, 6–4, 6–1	(Spain) Mario Vilella Martínez	(Spain) Daniel Muñoz de la Nava (Italy) Stefano Travaglia	(Spain) Albert Alcaraz Ivorra (Spain) Aaron Cortes Alcaraz (United Kingdom) Billy Harris (Spain) Sergio Martos Gornés
February 6	Spain F4 Futures; Paguera, Spain; Clay $15,000; Singles and doubles draws	(Spain) Gerard Granollers (Spain) Pedro Martínez; 6–3, 6–4	(Spain) Sergio Martos Gornés (Chile) Cristóbal Saavedra Corvalán	(Spain) Daniel Muñoz de la Nava (Italy) Stefano Travaglia	(Spain) Albert Alcaraz Ivorra (Spain) Aaron Cortes Alcaraz (United Kingdom) Billy Harris (Spain) Sergio Martos Gornés
February 6	Tunisia F5 Futures; Hammamet, Tunisia; Clay $15,000; Singles and doubles draws	(Montenegro) Ljubomir Čelebić; 6–3, 6–2	(Spain) Marc Giner	(Russia) Ivan Gakhov (Portugal) Gonçalo Oliveira	(Spain) Carlos Taberner (France) Jordan Ubiergo (Brazil) João Pedro Sorgi (Portugal) João Monteiro
February 6	Tunisia F5 Futures; Hammamet, Tunisia; Clay $15,000; Singles and doubles draws	(Portugal) Felipe Cunha e Silva (Portugal) João Monteiro; 6–2, 7–6^{(7–4)}	(Italy) Giulio Di Meo (Colombia) Cristian Rodríguez	(Russia) Ivan Gakhov (Portugal) Gonçalo Oliveira	(Spain) Carlos Taberner (France) Jordan Ubiergo (Brazil) João Pedro Sorgi (Portugal) João Monteiro
February 6	Turkey F5 Futures; Antalya, Turkey; Hard $15,000; Singles and doubles draws	(Austria) Sebastian Ofner; 3–6, 6–1, 6–2	(Czech Republic) Michal Konečný	(United States) Alexios Halebian (Republic of Ireland) Peter Bothwell	(Russia) Alen Avidzba (Poland) Hubert Hurkacz (Colombia) Felipe Mantilla (Israel) Dekel Bar
February 6	Turkey F5 Futures; Antalya, Turkey; Hard $15,000; Singles and doubles draws	(Czech Republic) Michal Konečný (Czech Republic) Matěj Vocel; 6–3, 3–6, [10–7]	(Ukraine) Marat Deviatiarov (Japan) Yuichi Ito	(United States) Alexios Halebian (Republic of Ireland) Peter Bothwell	(Russia) Alen Avidzba (Poland) Hubert Hurkacz (Colombia) Felipe Mantilla (Israel) Dekel Bar
February 13	Switzerland F2 Futures; Bellevue, Switzerland; Carpet (indoor) $25,000; Singles and doubles draws	(Germany) Daniel Altmaier; 7–5, 7–6^{(7–5)}	(Germany) Tim Pütz	(Austria) David Pichler (Germany) Yannick Hanfmann	(France) Grégoire Barrère (Italy) Edoardo Eremin (Switzerland) Siméon Rossier (Italy) Matteo Berrettini
February 13	Switzerland F2 Futures; Bellevue, Switzerland; Carpet (indoor) $25,000; Singles and doubles draws	(Germany) Daniel Altmaier (Germany) Marvin Netuschil; 7–5, 1–6, [11–9]	(Austria) Maximilian Neuchrist (Netherlands) David Pel	(Austria) David Pichler (Germany) Yannick Hanfmann	(France) Grégoire Barrère (Italy) Edoardo Eremin (Switzerland) Siméon Rossier (Italy) Matteo Berrettini
February 13	China F1 Futures; Anning, China; Clay $15,000; Singles and doubles draws	(New Zealand) José Statham; 4–6, 6–2, 7–6^{(7–4)}	(Italy) Marco Bortolotti	(Serbia) Danilo Petrović (China) Bai Yan	(China) Wang Chuhan (China) Sun Fajing (Croatia) Nino Serdarušić (Brazil) Fernando Romboli
February 13	China F1 Futures; Anning, China; Clay $15,000; Singles and doubles draws	(Italy) Marco Bortolotti (Croatia) Nino Serdarušić; 6–7^{(6–8)}, 6–3, [10–8]	(Australia) Thomas Fancutt (Australia) Brandon Walkin	(Serbia) Danilo Petrović (China) Bai Yan	(China) Wang Chuhan (China) Sun Fajing (Croatia) Nino Serdarušić (Brazil) Fernando Romboli
February 13	Egypt F5 Futures; Sharm El Sheikh, Egypt; Hard $15,000; Singles and doubles draws	(Egypt) Karim-Mohamed Maamoun; 6–4, 6–2	(Ukraine) Artem Smirnov	(Czech Republic) Zdeněk Kolář (France) Gleb Sakharov	(Sweden) Markus Eriksson (France) Benjamin Bonzi (Portugal) Frederico Ferreira Silva (Italy) Giorgio Ricca
February 13	Egypt F5 Futures; Sharm El Sheikh, Egypt; Hard $15,000; Singles and doubles draws	(Australia) Nathan Eshmade (Netherlands) Sem Verbeek; 3–6, 6–3, [10–3]	(Germany) Jonas Lütjen (South Africa) Nicolaas Scholtz	(Czech Republic) Zdeněk Kolář (France) Gleb Sakharov	(Sweden) Markus Eriksson (France) Benjamin Bonzi (Portugal) Frederico Ferreira Silva (Italy) Giorgio Ricca
February 13	Great Britain F3 Futures; Shrewsbury, Great Britain; Hard (indoor) $15,000; Singles and doubles draws	(Germany) Oscar Otte; 7–5, 7–6^{(7–4)}	(United Kingdom) Marcus Willis	(Sweden) Jonathan Mridha (Slovakia) Filip Horanský	(United Kingdom) Jonathan Gray (Germany) Tobias Simon (Spain) Andrés Artuñedo (Belgium) Yannick Vandenbulcke
February 13	Great Britain F3 Futures; Shrewsbury, Great Britain; Hard (indoor) $15,000; Singles and doubles draws	(United Kingdom) Scott Clayton (United Kingdom) Luke Johnson; 3–6, 6–4, [10–6]	(United Kingdom) Jack Molloy (United Kingdom) Marcus Willis	(Sweden) Jonathan Mridha (Slovakia) Filip Horanský	(United Kingdom) Jonathan Gray (Germany) Tobias Simon (Spain) Andrés Artuñedo (Belgium) Yannick Vandenbulcke
February 13	India F1 Futures; Chandigarh, India; Hard $15,000; Singles and doubles draws	(India) Yuki Bhambri; 6–2, 6–2	(India) Sriram Balaji	(India) Sidharth Rawat (India) Haadin Bava	(India) Sanam Singh (India) Vishnu Vardhan (India) Sasikumar Mukund (India) Siddharth Vishwakarma
February 13	India F1 Futures; Chandigarh, India; Hard $15,000; Singles and doubles draws	(India) Vijay Sundar Prashanth (India) Sanam Singh; 7–6^{(7–4)}, 6–4	(Germany) Pirmin Hänle (United States) Shane Vinsant	(India) Sidharth Rawat (India) Haadin Bava	(India) Sanam Singh (India) Vishnu Vardhan (India) Sasikumar Mukund (India) Siddharth Vishwakarma
February 13	Indonesia F2 Futures; Jakarta, Indonesia; Hard $15,000; Singles and doubles draws	(Germany) Sebastian Fanselow; 6–3, 6–3	(Australia) Dayne Kelly	(Japan) Sho Katayama (United States) Nathan Pasha	(Japan) Masato Shiga (Japan) Shintaro Imai (United States) Evan King (South Korea) Oh Chan-yeong
February 13	Indonesia F2 Futures; Jakarta, Indonesia; Hard $15,000; Singles and doubles draws	(United States) Evan King (United States) Nathan Pasha; 6–3, 6–7^{(8–10)}, [10–6]	(Japan) Soichiro Moritani (Japan) Masato Shiga	(Japan) Sho Katayama (United States) Nathan Pasha	(Japan) Masato Shiga (Japan) Shintaro Imai (United States) Evan King (South Korea) Oh Chan-yeong
February 13	Spain F5 Futures; Murcia, Spain; Clay $15,000; Singles and doubles draws	(Spain) Ricardo Ojeda Lara; 6–7^{(3–7)}, 6–2, 7–6^{(7–3)}	(Spain) Daniel Muñoz de la Nava	(Spain) Roberto Ortega Olmedo (Spain) Carlos Boluda-Purkiss	(Spain) Bernabé Zapata Miralles (Brazil) Pedro Sakamoto (Spain) Miguel Semmler (Russia) Ivan Gakhov
February 13	Spain F5 Futures; Murcia, Spain; Clay $15,000; Singles and doubles draws	(Russia) Ivan Gakhov (Spain) David Vega Hernández; 5–7, 6–3, [10–8]	(Spain) Pedro Martínez (Spain) Oriol Roca Batalla	(Spain) Roberto Ortega Olmedo (Spain) Carlos Boluda-Purkiss	(Spain) Bernabé Zapata Miralles (Brazil) Pedro Sakamoto (Spain) Miguel Semmler (Russia) Ivan Gakhov
February 13	Tunisia F6 Futures; Hammamet, Tunisia; Clay $15,000; Singles and doubles draws	(Bosnia and Herzegovina) Tomislav Brkić; 6–1, 4–1 ret.	(Croatia) Kristijan Mesaroš	(Brazil) Marcelo Zormann (Japan) Ryusei Makiguchi	(France) Thomas Bréchemier (Italy) Filippo Baldi (France) Thomas Setodji (France) Louis Chaix
February 13	Tunisia F6 Futures; Hammamet, Tunisia; Clay $15,000; Singles and doubles draws	(Tunisia) Anis Ghorbel (Colombia) Cristian Rodríguez; 6–1, 6–2	(Portugal) Felipe Cunha e Silva (Brazil) Wilson Leite	(Brazil) Marcelo Zormann (Japan) Ryusei Makiguchi	(France) Thomas Bréchemier (Italy) Filippo Baldi (France) Thomas Setodji (France) Louis Chaix
February 13	Turkey F6 Futures; Antalya, Turkey; Hard $15,000; Singles and doubles draws	(Germany) Marc Sieber; 6–3, 7–6^{(7–5)}	(Zimbabwe) Benjamin Lock	(Slovakia) Patrik Fabian (Belgium) Christopher Heyman	(Italy) Claudio Fortuna (United States) Mousheg Hovhannisyan (Romania) Nicolae Frunză (Colombia) Felipe Mantilla
February 13	Turkey F6 Futures; Antalya, Turkey; Hard $15,000; Singles and doubles draws	(Croatia) Ivan Sabanov (Croatia) Matej Sabanov; 4–6, 6–0 [12–10]	(Ukraine) Vadym Ursu (Ukraine) Volodymyr Uzhylovskyi	(Slovakia) Patrik Fabian (Belgium) Christopher Heyman	(Italy) Claudio Fortuna (United States) Mousheg Hovhannisyan (Romania) Nicolae Frunză (Colombia) Felipe Mantilla
February 13	USA F7 Futures; Orlando, United States; Clay $15,000; Singles and doubles draws	(Austria) Michael Linzer; 6–3, 6–0	(Argentina) Facundo Argüello	(Sweden) Christian Lindell (Argentina) Genaro Alberto Olivieri	(Japan) Makoto Ochi (United States) Jared Hiltzik (Bolivia) Hugo Dellien (Argentina) Juan Ignacio Londero
February 13	USA F7 Futures; Orlando, United States; Clay $15,000; Singles and doubles draws	(United States) Connor Smith (United States) Rhyne Williams; 3–6, 6–3, [10–8]	(Bolivia) Boris Arias (Germany) Dominik Köpfer	(Sweden) Christian Lindell (Argentina) Genaro Alberto Olivieri	(Japan) Makoto Ochi (United States) Jared Hiltzik (Bolivia) Hugo Dellien (Argentina) Juan Ignacio Londero
February 20	China F2 Futures; Anning, China; Clay $15,000; Singles and doubles draws	(Chinese Taipei) Yang Tsung-hua; 2–6, 6–4, 7–6^{(9–7)}	(New Zealand) José Statham	(Brazil) Fernando Romboli (Italy) Marco Bortolotti	(Japan) Ryota Tanuma (China) Bai Yan (Russia) Ilya Vasilyev (Croatia) Nino Serdarušić
February 20	China F2 Futures; Anning, China; Clay $15,000; Singles and doubles draws	(Chinese Taipei) Huang Liang-chi (Japan) Issei Okamura; 6–1, 6–4	(Argentina) Franco Agamenone (Argentina) Matías Zukas	(Brazil) Fernando Romboli (Italy) Marco Bortolotti	(Japan) Ryota Tanuma (China) Bai Yan (Russia) Ilya Vasilyev (Croatia) Nino Serdarušić
February 20	Egypt F6 Futures; Sharm El Sheikh, Egypt; Hard $15,000; Singles and doubles draws	(France) Benjamin Bonzi; 7–5, 7–6^{(7–4)}	(Slovakia) Patrik Néma	(France) Jules Okala (South Africa) Nicolaas Scholtz	(Slovakia) Alex Molčan (Ukraine) Artem Smirnov (Slovakia) Lukáš Klein (Belgium) Niels Desein
February 20	Egypt F6 Futures; Sharm El Sheikh, Egypt; Hard $15,000; Singles and doubles draws	(Netherlands) Colin van Beem (Netherlands) Sem Verbeek; 6–3, 6–2	(India) Chandril Sood (India) Lakshit Sood	(France) Jules Okala (South Africa) Nicolaas Scholtz	(Slovakia) Alex Molčan (Ukraine) Artem Smirnov (Slovakia) Lukáš Klein (Belgium) Niels Desein
February 20	India F2 Futures; Jorhat, India; Hard $15,000; Singles and doubles draws	(India) Sriram Balaji; 6–2, 7–6^{(7–1)}	(India) Vishnu Vardhan	(India) Vijay Sundar Prashanth (India) Sasikumar Mukund	(Poland) Mateusz Terczyński (United States) Shane Vinsant (India) Haadin Bava (India) Mohit Mayur Jayaprakash
February 20	India F2 Futures; Jorhat, India; Hard $15,000; Singles and doubles draws	(India) Sriram Balaji (India) Vishnu Vardhan; 7–6^{(7–5)}, 4–6, [10–6]	(India) Mohit Mayur Jayaprakash (India) Vijay Sundar Prashanth	(India) Vijay Sundar Prashanth (India) Sasikumar Mukund	(Poland) Mateusz Terczyński (United States) Shane Vinsant (India) Haadin Bava (India) Mohit Mayur Jayaprakash
February 20	Indonesia F3 Futures; Jakarta, Indonesia; Hard $15,000; Singles and doubles draws	(Germany) Sebastian Fanselow; 6–1, 6–3	(France) Alexandre Müller	(Australia) Dayne Kelly (Japan) Sho Shimabukuro	(France) Valentin Nourrissat (France) Antoine Escoffier (Japan) Sho Katayama (United States) Evan King
February 20	Indonesia F3 Futures; Jakarta, Indonesia; Hard $15,000; Singles and doubles draws	(Indonesia) Justin Barki (Indonesia) Christopher Rungkat; 6–3, 6–2	(Japan) Sho Katayama (Japan) Sho Shimabukuro	(Australia) Dayne Kelly (Japan) Sho Shimabukuro	(France) Valentin Nourrissat (France) Antoine Escoffier (Japan) Sho Katayama (United States) Evan King
February 20	Spain F6 Futures; Cornellà, Spain; Hard $15,000; Singles and doubles draws	(Spain) Roberto Ortega Olmedo; 6–4,6–3	(Spain) Oriol Roca Batalla	(Spain) Jaume Munar (Spain) Carlos Taberner	(Russia) Alexander Zhurbin (Spain) Andrés Artuñedo (Argentina) Pedro Cachin (Spain) Bernabé Zapata Miralles
February 20	Spain F6 Futures; Cornellà, Spain; Hard $15,000; Singles and doubles draws	(Spain) Marc López (Spain) Jaume Munar; 6–3, 6–1	(France) Jonathan Kanar (France) Mick Lescure	(Spain) Jaume Munar (Spain) Carlos Taberner	(Russia) Alexander Zhurbin (Spain) Andrés Artuñedo (Argentina) Pedro Cachin (Spain) Bernabé Zapata Miralles
February 20	Tunisia F7 Futures; Hammamet, Tunisia; Clay $15,000; Singles and doubles draws	(Italy) Stefano Travaglia; 6–7^{(7–9)}, 6–3, 6–3	(Bosnia and Herzegovina) Tomislav Brkić	(Spain) Mario Vilella Martínez (Romania) Dragoș Dima	(Tunisia) Moez Echargui (Italy) Filippo Baldi (Russia) Ivan Nedelko (Uruguay) Martín Cuevas
February 20	Tunisia F7 Futures; Hammamet, Tunisia; Clay $15,000; Singles and doubles draws	(Bosnia and Herzegovina) Tomislav Brkić (Serbia) Nikola Ćaćić; 6–3, 6–2	(Brazil) Oscar José Gutierrez (Brazil) Nicolas Santos	(Spain) Mario Vilella Martínez (Romania) Dragoș Dima	(Tunisia) Moez Echargui (Italy) Filippo Baldi (Russia) Ivan Nedelko (Uruguay) Martín Cuevas
February 20	Turkey F7 Futures; Antalya, Turkey; Hard $15,000; Singles and doubles draws	(Turkey) Altuğ Çelikbilek; 4–6, 7–6^{(7–5)}, 6–4	(Bulgaria) Alexandar Lazov	(Turkey) Cem İlkel (Turkey) Marsel İlhan	(Kazakhstan) Dmitry Popko (South Korea) Hong Seong-chan (Zimbabwe) Benjamin Lock (Ukraine) Vadym Ursu
February 20	Turkey F7 Futures; Antalya, Turkey; Hard $15,000; Singles and doubles draws	(Croatia) Ivan Sabanov (Croatia) Matej Sabanov; 7–6^{(7–4)}, 6–2	(Ukraine) Vadym Ursu (Ukraine) Volodymyr Uzhylovskyi	(Turkey) Cem İlkel (Turkey) Marsel İlhan	(Kazakhstan) Dmitry Popko (South Korea) Hong Seong-chan (Zimbabwe) Benjamin Lock (Ukraine) Vadym Ursu
February 20	USA F8 Futures; Indian Harbour Beach, United States; Clay $15,000; Singles and doubles draws	(Argentina) Andrea Collarini; 7–5, 7–6^{(8–6)}	(France) Corentin Denolly	(United States) Rhyne Williams (Germany) Dominik Köpfer	(India) Ramkumar Ramanathan (Austria) Michael Linzer (Japan) Makoto Ochi (Sweden) Fred Simonsson
February 20	USA F8 Futures; Indian Harbour Beach, United States; Clay $15,000; Singles and doubles draws	(Spain) Jaume Pla Malfeito (India) Ramkumar Ramanathan; 6–2, 6–7^{(5–7)}, [11–9]	(United States) Hunter Callahan (United States) Nick Chappell	(United States) Rhyne Williams (Germany) Dominik Köpfer	(India) Ramkumar Ramanathan (Austria) Michael Linzer (Japan) Makoto Ochi (Sweden) Fred Simonsson
February 27	Canada F1 Futures; Gatineau, Canada; Hard (indoor) $25,000; Singles and doubles draws	(Canada) Denis Shapovalov; 6–2, 6–4	(France) Gleb Sakharov	(United States) Eric Quigley (France) Hugo Nys	(United States) JC Aragone (Austria) Maximilian Neuchrist (Canada) Filip Peliwo (Germany) Tim Pütz
February 27	Canada F1 Futures; Gatineau, Canada; Hard (indoor) $25,000; Singles and doubles draws	(Latvia) Miķelis Lībietis (France) Hugo Nys; 7–6^{(7–4)}, 6–3	(France) Grégoire Barrère (France) Laurent Lokoli	(United States) Eric Quigley (France) Hugo Nys	(United States) JC Aragone (Austria) Maximilian Neuchrist (Canada) Filip Peliwo (Germany) Tim Pütz
February 27	France F4 Futures; Lille, France; Hard (indoor) $25,000; Singles and doubles draws	(Sweden) Mikael Ymer; 6–2, 6–3	(Netherlands) Botic van de Zandschulp	(Belgium) Yannick Mertens (Germany) Yannick Hanfmann	(Belgium) Christopher Heyman (Germany) Oscar Otte (France) Benjamin Bonzi (Netherlands) Niels Lootsma
February 27	France F4 Futures; Lille, France; Hard (indoor) $25,000; Singles and doubles draws	(Belgium) Niels Desein (France) David Guez; 6–1, 6–2	(France) Samuel Bensoussan (France) Yanais Laurent	(Belgium) Yannick Mertens (Germany) Yannick Hanfmann	(Belgium) Christopher Heyman (Germany) Oscar Otte (France) Benjamin Bonzi (Netherlands) Niels Lootsma
February 27	Italy F2 Futures; Trento, Italy; Carpet (indoor) $25,000; Singles and doubles draws	(Italy) Matteo Viola; 7–6^{(8–6)}, 6–0	(France) Yannick Jankovits	(France) Grégoire Jacq (Lithuania) Laurynas Grigelis	(Bulgaria) Dimitar Kuzmanov (Germany) Johannes Härteis (Italy) Alessandro Bega (Germany) Matthias Bachinger
February 27	Italy F2 Futures; Trento, Italy; Carpet (indoor) $25,000; Singles and doubles draws	(France) Grégoire Jacq (France) Yannick Jankovits; 6–2, 6–1	(Germany) Johannes Härteis (Germany) Nils Langer	(France) Grégoire Jacq (Lithuania) Laurynas Grigelis	(Bulgaria) Dimitar Kuzmanov (Germany) Johannes Härteis (Italy) Alessandro Bega (Germany) Matthias Bachinger
February 27	China F3 Futures; Anning, China; Clay $15,000; Singles and doubles draws	(China) Wu Yibing; 6–4, 7–6^{(8–6)}	(Serbia) Danilo Petrović	(Australia) Thomas Fancutt (Italy) Marco Bortolotti	(China) Te Rigele (China) Sun Fajing (Hong Kong) Wong Hong Kit (China) Wang Ruikai
February 27	China F3 Futures; Anning, China; Clay $15,000; Singles and doubles draws	(Australia) Thomas Fancutt (Australia) Brandon Walkin; 6–4, 6–4	(China) Bai Yan (China) Cai Zhao	(Australia) Thomas Fancutt (Italy) Marco Bortolotti	(China) Te Rigele (China) Sun Fajing (Hong Kong) Wong Hong Kit (China) Wang Ruikai
February 27	Egypt F7 Futures; Sharm El Sheikh, Eypt; Hard $15,000; Singles and doubles draws	(Egypt) Karim-Mohamed Maamoun; 6–0, 6–3	(Slovakia) Alex Molčan	(Egypt) Youssef Hossam (France) Ugo Humbert	(Chinese Taipei) Chen Ti (Serbia) Dejan Katić (Germany) Rudolf Molleker (South Africa) Nicolaas Scholtz
February 27	Egypt F7 Futures; Sharm El Sheikh, Eypt; Hard $15,000; Singles and doubles draws	(Poland) Adrian Andrzejczuk (Ukraine) Daniil Zarichanskyy; 4–6, 6–3, [10–3]	(India) Chandril Sood (India) Lakshit Sood	(Egypt) Youssef Hossam (France) Ugo Humbert	(Chinese Taipei) Chen Ti (Serbia) Dejan Katić (Germany) Rudolf Molleker (South Africa) Nicolaas Scholtz
February 27	India F3 Futures; Guwahati, India; Hard $15,000; Singles and doubles draws	(India) Sasikumar Mukund; 6–3, 2–6, 6–4	(Germany) Sami Reinwein	(United States) Shane Vinsant (India) Vishnu Vardhan	(Spain) José Francisco Vidal Azorín (India) Sanam Singh (India) Sidharth Rawat (India) Vijay Sundar Prashanth
February 27	India F3 Futures; Guwahati, India; Hard $15,000; Singles and doubles draws	(India) Sriram Balaji (India) Vishnu Vardhan; 6–3, 3–6, [10–6]	(India) Vijay Sundar Prashanth (India) Sanam Singh	(United States) Shane Vinsant (India) Vishnu Vardhan	(Spain) José Francisco Vidal Azorín (India) Sanam Singh (India) Sidharth Rawat (India) Vijay Sundar Prashanth
February 27	Portugal F1 Futures; Vale do Lobo, Portugal; Hard $15,000; Singles and doubles draws	(Spain) Ricardo Ojeda Lara; 6–3, 6–1	(Portugal) João Monteiro	(Portugal) João Domingues (Austria) Lucas Miedler	(United Kingdom) Billy Harris (Israel) Ben Patael (Spain) Roberto Ortega Olmedo (Norway) Viktor Durasovic
February 27	Portugal F1 Futures; Vale do Lobo, Portugal; Hard $15,000; Singles and doubles draws	(Italy) Erik Crepaldi (Portugal) Gonçalo Oliveira; 1–6, 6–2, [10–5]	(Norway) Viktor Durasovic (Austria) Lucas Miedler	(Portugal) João Domingues (Austria) Lucas Miedler	(United Kingdom) Billy Harris (Israel) Ben Patael (Spain) Roberto Ortega Olmedo (Norway) Viktor Durasovic
February 27	Tunisia F8 Futures; Hammamet, Tunisia; Clay $15,000; Singles and doubles draws	(Serbia) Miljan Zekić; 6–7^{(7–9)}, 6–3, 6–4	(Bosnia and Herzegovina) Tomislav Brkić	(Italy) Stefano Travaglia (Spain) Miguel Semmler	(Germany) Peter Torebko (Chile) Bastián Malla (Russia) Ivan Gakhov (Brazil) Nicolas Santos
February 27	Tunisia F8 Futures; Hammamet, Tunisia; Clay $15,000; Singles and doubles draws	(France) Maxime Chazal (Germany) Peter Torebko; 7–6^{(7–2)}, 6–4	(Brazil) Oscar José Gutierrez (Brazil) Nicolas Santos	(Italy) Stefano Travaglia (Spain) Miguel Semmler	(Germany) Peter Torebko (Chile) Bastián Malla (Russia) Ivan Gakhov (Brazil) Nicolas Santos
February 27	Turkey F8 Futures; Antalya, Turkey; Hard $15,000; Singles and doubles draws	(Kazakhstan) Dmitry Popko; 6–1, 6–2	(Turkey) Anıl Yüksel	(Turkey) Altuğ Çelikbilek (Germany) Tobias Simon	(Turkey) Sarp Ağabigün (Slovenia) Tom Kočevar-Dešman (Zimbabwe) Benjamin Lock (Ukraine) Volodymyr Uzhylovskyi
February 27	Turkey F8 Futures; Antalya, Turkey; Hard $15,000; Singles and doubles draws	(Brazil) Pedro Bernardi (Guatemala) Christopher Díaz Figueroa; 2–6, 6–2, [12–10]	(South Korea) Hong Seong-chan (Zimbabwe) Benjamin Lock	(Turkey) Altuğ Çelikbilek (Germany) Tobias Simon	(Turkey) Sarp Ağabigün (Slovenia) Tom Kočevar-Dešman (Zimbabwe) Benjamin Lock (Ukraine) Volodymyr Uzhylovskyi
February 27	USA F9 Futures; Orlando, United States; Clay $15,000; Singles and doubles draws	(Germany) Dominik Köpfer; 4–6, 6–3, 7–5	(United States) Tommy Paul	(Sweden) Fred Simonsson (Argentina) Andrea Collarini	(Croatia) Ante Pavić (Hungary) Péter Nagy (Germany) Julian Lenz (France) Corentin Denolly
February 27	USA F9 Futures; Orlando, United States; Clay $15,000; Singles and doubles draws	(United States) Connor Smith (United States) Rhyne Williams; 6–4, 6–4	(Spain) Jaume Pla Malfeito (India) Ramkumar Ramanathan	(Sweden) Fred Simonsson (Argentina) Andrea Collarini	(Croatia) Ante Pavić (Hungary) Péter Nagy (Germany) Julian Lenz (France) Corentin Denolly

=== March ===
Week of	Tournament	Winner	Runners-up	Semifinalists	Quarterfinalists
March 6	Australia F1 Futures; Mildura, Australia; Grass $25,000; Singles and doubles draws	(Australia) Dayne Kelly; 4–6, 6–4, 7–6^{(7–4)}	(Australia) Bradley Mousley	(United States) Evan King (New Zealand) Finn Tearney	(Australia) Gavin van Peperzeel (Australia) Jeremy Beale (Australia) Nathan Eshmade (Australia) Alex Bolt
March 6	Australia F1 Futures; Mildura, Australia; Grass $25,000; Singles and doubles draws	(Australia) Alex Bolt (Australia) Dane Propoggia; 6–3, 6–7^{(2–7)}, [11–9]	(Australia) Harry Bourchier (Australia) Gavin van Peperzeel	(United States) Evan King (New Zealand) Finn Tearney	(Australia) Gavin van Peperzeel (Australia) Jeremy Beale (Australia) Nathan Eshmade (Australia) Alex Bolt
March 6	Canada F2 Futures; Sherbrooke, Canada; Hard (indoor) $25,000; Singles and doubles draws	(Canada) Félix Auger-Aliassime; 3–6, 6–3, 6–4	(France) Gleb Sakharov	(Canada) Brayden Schnur (Canada) Denis Shapovalov	(United Kingdom) Edward Corrie (France) Grégoire Barrère (Switzerland) Adrien Bossel (France) Laurent Lokoli
March 6	Canada F2 Futures; Sherbrooke, Canada; Hard (indoor) $25,000; Singles and doubles draws	(Sweden) Isak Arvidsson (Denmark) Frederik Nielsen; 6–0, 6–4	(Latvia) Miķelis Lībietis (France) Hugo Nys	(Canada) Brayden Schnur (Canada) Denis Shapovalov	(United Kingdom) Edward Corrie (France) Grégoire Barrère (Switzerland) Adrien Bossel (France) Laurent Lokoli
March 6	Croatia F1 Futures; Rovinj, Croatia; Hard $15,000; Singles and doubles draws	(Spain) Pere Riba; 6−3, 6−0	(Russia) Alexey Vatutin	(Italy) Riccardo Bellotti (Croatia) Mate Delić	(Croatia) Nino Serdarušić (Romania) Vasile Antonescu (Germany) Pascal Meis (Czech Republic) Zdeněk Kolář
March 6	Croatia F1 Futures; Rovinj, Croatia; Hard $15,000; Singles and doubles draws	(Romania) Vasile Antonescu (Romania) Alexandru Jecan; 6–1, 6–3	(Romania) Patrick Grigoriu (Romania) Petru-Alexandru Luncanu	(Italy) Riccardo Bellotti (Croatia) Mate Delić	(Croatia) Nino Serdarušić (Romania) Vasile Antonescu (Germany) Pascal Meis (Czech Republic) Zdeněk Kolář
March 6	Egypt F8 Futures; Sharm El Sheikh, Egypt; Hard $15,000; Singles and doubles draws	(Bosnia and Herzegovina) Aldin Šetkić; 6–3, 6–4	(France) Ugo Humbert	(Italy) Claudio Fortuna (Chinese Taipei) Chen Ti	(Netherlands) Colin van Beem (Russia) Denis Klok (China) Sun Fajing (Egypt) Youssef Hossam
March 6	Egypt F8 Futures; Sharm El Sheikh, Egypt; Hard $15,000; Singles and doubles draws	(Philippines) Francis Casey Alcantara (Zimbabwe) Benjamin Lock; 6–3, 6–7^{(7–9)}, [10–7]	(Chinese Taipei) Chen Ti (China) Sun Fajing	(Italy) Claudio Fortuna (Chinese Taipei) Chen Ti	(Netherlands) Colin van Beem (Russia) Denis Klok (China) Sun Fajing (Egypt) Youssef Hossam
March 6	France F5 Futures; Toulouse, France; Hard (indoor) $15,000; Singles and doubles draws	(France) David Guez; 6–3, 6–4	(France) Fabien Reboul	(France) Yanais Laurent (Germany) Mats Moraing	(France) Pierre Faivre (France) Yannick Jankovits (France) Maxime Tabatruong (United States) Thai-Son Kwiatkowski
March 6	France F5 Futures; Toulouse, France; Hard (indoor) $15,000; Singles and doubles draws	(United States) Thai-Son Kwiatkowski (France) Fabien Reboul; 6−3, 7−6^{(7−4)}	(Belgium) Niels Desein (France) Yannick Jankovits	(France) Yanais Laurent (Germany) Mats Moraing	(France) Pierre Faivre (France) Yannick Jankovits (France) Maxime Tabatruong (United States) Thai-Son Kwiatkowski
March 6	Greece F1 Futures; Heraklion, Greece; Clay $15,000; Singles and doubles draws	(Czech Republic) Michal Konečný; 6–4, 4–6, 6–2	(France) Baptiste Crepatte	(Switzerland) Yann Marti (United Kingdom) Neil Pauffley	(Austria) Sebastian Ofner (Uzbekistan) Temur Ismailov (Netherlands) Kevin Griekspoor (United Kingdom) Richard Gabb
March 6	Greece F1 Futures; Heraklion, Greece; Clay $15,000; Singles and doubles draws	(Netherlands) Kevin Griekspoor (Netherlands) Tallon Griekspoor; 6–3, 6–4	(United Kingdom) Richard Gabb (United Kingdom) Luke Johnson	(Switzerland) Yann Marti (United Kingdom) Neil Pauffley	(Austria) Sebastian Ofner (Uzbekistan) Temur Ismailov (Netherlands) Kevin Griekspoor (United Kingdom) Richard Gabb
March 6	India F4 Futures; Bhilai, India; Hard $15,000; Singles and doubles draws	(India) Prajnesh Gunneswaran; 6–4, 6–2	(India) Sriram Balaji	(India) Vishnu Vardhan (Germany) Sami Reinwein	(Germany) Pirmin Hänle (India) Sidharth Rawat (India) Sasikumar Mukund (India) Siddharth Vishwakarma
March 6	India F4 Futures; Bhilai, India; Hard $15,000; Singles and doubles draws	(India) Sriram Balaji (India) Vishnu Vardhan; 6–2, 6–4	(United States) Alexander Centenari (Germany) Sami Reinwein	(India) Vishnu Vardhan (Germany) Sami Reinwein	(Germany) Pirmin Hänle (India) Sidharth Rawat (India) Sasikumar Mukund (India) Siddharth Vishwakarma
March 6	Italy F3 Futures; Basiglio, Italy; Hard (indoor) $15,000; Singles and doubles draws	(Italy) Alessandro Bega; 3–6, 6–3, 6–4	(Croatia) Viktor Galović	(France) Hugo Grenier (Netherlands) Antal van der Duim	(Italy) Lorenzo Frigerio (Switzerland) Raphael Baltensperger (Italy) Gianluca Di Nicola (Germany) Lukas Rüpke
March 6	Italy F3 Futures; Basiglio, Italy; Hard (indoor) $15,000; Singles and doubles draws	(Czech Republic) Jan Mertl (Czech Republic) Petr Michnev; 7−6^{(9−7)}, 7−6^{(7−1)}	(Italy) Alessandro Coppini (Italy) Emanuele Dorio	(France) Hugo Grenier (Netherlands) Antal van der Duim	(Italy) Lorenzo Frigerio (Switzerland) Raphael Baltensperger (Italy) Gianluca Di Nicola (Germany) Lukas Rüpke
March 6	Japan F1 Futures; Nishitama, Japan; Hard $15,000; Singles and doubles draws	(Japan) Yusuke Takahashi; 7–5, 6–3	(Japan) Takuto Niki	(Thailand) Wishaya Trongcharoenchaikul (Japan) Hiroyasu Ehara	(Japan) Renta Tokuda (Japan) Sho Katayama (South Korea) Noh Sang-woo (Japan) Kaito Itsusaki
March 6	Japan F1 Futures; Nishitama, Japan; Hard $15,000; Singles and doubles draws	(Japan) Katsuki Nagao (Japan) Hiromasa Oku; 6−0, 7−6^{(7−2)}	(Japan) Takuto Niki (Japan) Kaito Uesugi	(Thailand) Wishaya Trongcharoenchaikul (Japan) Hiroyasu Ehara	(Japan) Renta Tokuda (Japan) Sho Katayama (South Korea) Noh Sang-woo (Japan) Kaito Itsusaki
March 6	Portugal F2 Futures; Faro, Portugal; Hard $15,000; Singles and doubles draws	(Belgium) Yannick Mertens; 6–4, 6–2	(Austria) Lucas Miedler	(Spain) Carlos Gómez-Herrera (Portugal) João Domingues	(Spain) Bernabé Zapata Miralles (Spain) Roberto Ortega Olmedo (Portugal) João Monteiro (Switzerland) Antoine Bellier
March 6	Portugal F2 Futures; Faro, Portugal; Hard $15,000; Singles and doubles draws	(United Kingdom) James Marsalek (Austria) Lucas Miedler; 5–7, 6–1, [10–6]	(Switzerland) Antoine Bellier (Ukraine) Marat Deviatiarov	(Spain) Carlos Gómez-Herrera (Portugal) João Domingues	(Spain) Bernabé Zapata Miralles (Spain) Roberto Ortega Olmedo (Portugal) João Monteiro (Switzerland) Antoine Bellier
March 6	Tunisia F9 Futures; Hammamet, Tunisia; Clay $15,000; Singles and doubles draws	(Spain) Oriol Roca Batalla; 6–1, 6–4	(Portugal) Gonçalo Oliveira	(Italy) Lorenzo Giustino (Italy) Omar Giacalone	(Chile) Cristóbal Saavedra Corvalán (France) Maxime Hamou (France) Geoffrey Blancaneaux (France) François-Arthur Vibert
March 6	Tunisia F9 Futures; Hammamet, Tunisia; Clay $15,000; Singles and doubles draws	(Russia) Ivan Gakhov (Spain) Oriol Roca Batalla; 6–4, 6–7^{(3–7)}, [10–5]	(Venezuela) Jordi Muñoz Abreu (Chile) Cristóbal Saavedra Corvalán	(Italy) Lorenzo Giustino (Italy) Omar Giacalone	(Chile) Cristóbal Saavedra Corvalán (France) Maxime Hamou (France) Geoffrey Blancaneaux (France) François-Arthur Vibert
March 6	Turkey F9 Futures; Antalya, Turkey; Clay $15,000; Singles and doubles draws	(United Kingdom) Jay Clarke; 6–2, 6–4	(France) Alexis Musialek	(Belgium) Clément Geens (Austria) Peter Goldsteiner	(Czech Republic) Václav Šafránek (Belgium) Joran Vliegen (Argentina) Juan Ignacio Ameal (Poland) Kamil Majchrzak
March 6	Turkey F9 Futures; Antalya, Turkey; Clay $15,000; Singles and doubles draws	(Poland) Kamil Majchrzak (Brazil) Pedro Sakamoto; 6–2, 6–2	(Brazil) Pedro Bernardi (Guatemala) Christopher Díaz Figueroa	(Belgium) Clément Geens (Austria) Peter Goldsteiner	(Czech Republic) Václav Šafránek (Belgium) Joran Vliegen (Argentina) Juan Ignacio Ameal (Poland) Kamil Majchrzak
March 13	Australia F2 Futures; Canberra, Australia; Clay $25,000; Singles and doubles draws	(Australia) Marc Polmans; 7–6^{(7–2)}, 3–6, 6–4	(Australia) Blake Mott	(Australia) Maverick Banes (Australia) Omar Jasika	(Australia) Steven de Waard (United States) Evan King (Australia) Greg Jones (New Zealand) José Statham
March 13	Australia F2 Futures; Canberra, Australia; Clay $25,000; Singles and doubles draws	(United States) Evan King (United States) Nathan Pasha; 4–6, 6–3, [10–4]	(Australia) Maverick Banes (Australia) Gavin van Peperzeel	(Australia) Maverick Banes (Australia) Omar Jasika	(Australia) Steven de Waard (United States) Evan King (Australia) Greg Jones (New Zealand) José Statham
March 13	USA F10 Futures; Bakersfield, United States; Hard $25,000; Singles and doubles draws	(Kazakhstan) Dmitry Popko; 6–3, 7–6^{(8–6)}	(Belgium) Kimmer Coppejans	(United States) Keegan Smith (Germany) Sebastian Fanselow	(Germany) Dominik Köpfer (United States) Bradley Klahn (United States) Christian Harrison (United States) Marcos Giron
March 13	USA F10 Futures; Bakersfield, United States; Hard $25,000; Singles and doubles draws	(United States) Patrick Kawka (United States) Keegan Smith; 6–3, 3–6, [10–6]	(United States) Jared Hiltzik (Germany) Dominik Köpfer	(United States) Keegan Smith (Germany) Sebastian Fanselow	(Germany) Dominik Köpfer (United States) Bradley Klahn (United States) Christian Harrison (United States) Marcos Giron
March 13	Croatia F2 Futures; Poreč, Croatia; Clay $15,000; Singles and doubles draws	(Italy) Riccardo Bellotti; 6–4, 6–3	(Czech Republic) Zdeněk Kolář	(Spain) Pere Riba (Croatia) Kristijan Mesaroš	(Croatia) Mate Delić (Bosnia and Herzegovina) Tomislav Brkić (Austria) Pascal Brunner (Austria) Jurij Rodionov
March 13	Croatia F2 Futures; Poreč, Croatia; Clay $15,000; Singles and doubles draws	(Czech Republic) Zdeněk Kolář (Croatia) Nino Serdarušić; 6–3, 6–3	(Croatia) Ivan Sabanov (Croatia) Matej Sabanov	(Spain) Pere Riba (Croatia) Kristijan Mesaroš	(Croatia) Mate Delić (Bosnia and Herzegovina) Tomislav Brkić (Austria) Pascal Brunner (Austria) Jurij Rodionov
March 13	Egypt F9 Futures; Sharm El Sheikh, Egypt; Hard $15,000; Singles and doubles draws	(South Africa) Nicolaas Scholtz; 7–6^{(7–5)}, 6–3	(Bosnia and Herzegovina) Aldin Šetkić	(Ukraine) Artem Smirnov (South Africa) Lloyd Harris	(Switzerland) Johan Nikles (Germany) Lukas Ollert (Egypt) Youssef Hossam (Russia) Alexander Ovcharov
March 13	Egypt F9 Futures; Sharm El Sheikh, Egypt; Hard $15,000; Singles and doubles draws	(Ukraine) Denys Molchanov (Ukraine) Artem Smirnov; Walkover	(South Africa) Lloyd Harris (South Africa) Nicolaas Scholtz	(Ukraine) Artem Smirnov (South Africa) Lloyd Harris	(Switzerland) Johan Nikles (Germany) Lukas Ollert (Egypt) Youssef Hossam (Russia) Alexander Ovcharov
March 13	France F6 Futures; Poitiers, France; Hard (indoor) $15,000; Singles and doubles draws	(Germany) Oscar Otte; 6–4, 6–4	(France) Rémi Boutillier	(France) Antoine Hoang (France) Evan Furness	(Netherlands) Antal van der Duim (Germany) Mats Moraing (France) Yannick Jankovits (Estonia) Vladimir Ivanov
March 13	France F6 Futures; Poitiers, France; Hard (indoor) $15,000; Singles and doubles draws	(France) Antoine Hoang (France) Grégoire Jacq; 6–4, 6–4	(Estonia) Vladimir Ivanov (Estonia) Kenneth Raisma	(France) Antoine Hoang (France) Evan Furness	(Netherlands) Antal van der Duim (Germany) Mats Moraing (France) Yannick Jankovits (Estonia) Vladimir Ivanov
March 13	Greece F2 Futures; Heraklion, Greece; Hard $15,000; Singles and doubles draws	(Belarus) Yaraslav Shyla; 6–3, 6–3	(Czech Republic) Vít Kopřiva	(Switzerland) Adrian Bodmer (Czech Republic) Marek Jaloviec	(Austria) Sebastian Ofner (United Kingdom) Neil Pauffley (Austria) David Pichler (Russia) Markos Kalovelonis
March 13	Greece F2 Futures; Heraklion, Greece; Hard $15,000; Singles and doubles draws	(United States) Hunter Callahan (United States) Nicholas Hu; 4–6, 6–1, [13–11]	(Uzbekistan) Temur Ismailov (Russia) Markos Kalovelonis	(Switzerland) Adrian Bodmer (Czech Republic) Marek Jaloviec	(Austria) Sebastian Ofner (United Kingdom) Neil Pauffley (Austria) David Pichler (Russia) Markos Kalovelonis
March 13	India F5 Futures; Bangalore, India; Hard $15,000; Singles and doubles draws	(India) Sriram Balaji; 2–6, 6–3, 6–4	(India) Prajnesh Gunneswaran	(Germany) Sami Reinwein (India) Karanuday Singh	(India) Vijay Sundar Prashanth (India) Vishnu Vardhan (India) Haadin Bava (India) Sidharth Rawat
March 13	India F5 Futures; Bangalore, India; Hard $15,000; Singles and doubles draws	(India) Chandril Sood (India) Lakshit Sood; 2–6, 6–4, [10–6]	(India) Sriram Balaji (India) Vishnu Vardhan	(Germany) Sami Reinwein (India) Karanuday Singh	(India) Vijay Sundar Prashanth (India) Vishnu Vardhan (India) Haadin Bava (India) Sidharth Rawat
March 13	Israel F1 Futures; Ramat HaSharon, Israel; Hard $15,000; Singles and doubles draws	(France) Enzo Couacaud; 6–4, 6–4	(Israel) Edan Leshem	(Israel) Tal Goldengoren (Israel) Dekel Bar	(Israel) Ben Patael (Hungary) Gábor Borsos (Germany) Florian Fallert (Lithuania) Laurynas Grigelis
March 13	Israel F1 Futures; Ramat HaSharon, Israel; Hard $15,000; Singles and doubles draws	(Hungary) Gábor Borsos (Lithuania) Laurynas Grigelis; 6–3, 6–4	(Israel) Dekel Bar (Israel) Yshai Oliel	(Israel) Tal Goldengoren (Israel) Dekel Bar	(Israel) Ben Patael (Hungary) Gábor Borsos (Germany) Florian Fallert (Lithuania) Laurynas Grigelis
March 13	Italy F4 Futures; Sondrio, Italy; Hard (indoor) $15,000; Singles and doubles draws	(Czech Republic) Petr Michnev; 7–6^{(7–3)}, 6–4	(Italy) Salvatore Caruso	(Germany) Cedrik-Marcel Stebe (Italy) Matteo Viola	(Italy) Walter Trusendi (Italy) Luca Pancaldi (Italy) Alessandro Bega (Italy) Lorenzo Frigerio
March 13	Italy F4 Futures; Sondrio, Italy; Hard (indoor) $15,000; Singles and doubles draws	(Czech Republic) Petr Nouza (Czech Republic) David Škoch; 6–3, 5–7, [10–8]	(Italy) Walter Trusendi (Italy) Matteo Viola	(Germany) Cedrik-Marcel Stebe (Italy) Matteo Viola	(Italy) Walter Trusendi (Italy) Luca Pancaldi (Italy) Alessandro Bega (Italy) Lorenzo Frigerio
March 13	Japan F2 Futures; Nishitōkyō, Japan; Hard $15,000; Singles and doubles draws	(Australia) Max Purcell; 7–5, 7–6^{(10–8)}	(Japan) Yusuke Takahashi	(China) Li Zhe (Japan) Sho Katayama	(China) Gao Xin (Japan) Ibuki Furuta (Vietnam) Lý Hoàng Nam (Japan) Masaki Sasai
March 13	Japan F2 Futures; Nishitōkyō, Japan; Hard $15,000; Singles and doubles draws	(Japan) Takuto Niki (Japan) Kaito Uesugi; 7–6^{(7–5)}, 6–7^{(2–7)}, [10–3]	(Japan) Gengo Kikuchi (Japan) Shunrou Takeshima	(China) Li Zhe (Japan) Sho Katayama	(China) Gao Xin (Japan) Ibuki Furuta (Vietnam) Lý Hoàng Nam (Japan) Masaki Sasai
March 13	Portugal F3 Futures; Loulé, Portugal; Hard $15,000; Singles and doubles draws	(Spain) Roberto Ortega Olmedo; 6–2, 6–4	(Portugal) João Domingues	(Portugal) João Monteiro (Austria) Lucas Miedler	(Spain) Ricardo Ojeda Lara (Italy) Enrico Dalla Valle (United Kingdom) Tom Farquharson (Brazil) Eduardo Dischinger
March 13	Portugal F3 Futures; Loulé, Portugal; Hard $15,000; Singles and doubles draws	(Spain) Roberto Ortega Olmedo (Spain) David Vega Hernández; 6–4, 7–5	(Spain) Carlos Gómez-Herrera (United Kingdom) Nikki Roenn	(Portugal) João Monteiro (Austria) Lucas Miedler	(Spain) Ricardo Ojeda Lara (Italy) Enrico Dalla Valle (United Kingdom) Tom Farquharson (Brazil) Eduardo Dischinger
March 13	Spain F7 Futures; Jávea, Spain; Clay $15,000; Singles and doubles draws	(Argentina) Pedro Cachin; 6–3, 6–3	(Spain) Bernabé Zapata Miralles	(Spain) Pedro Martínez (Spain) Javier Martí	(Spain) Carlos Boluda-Purkiss (Spain) Mario Vilella Martínez (Spain) Marc Giner (Spain) Carlos Taberner
March 13	Spain F7 Futures; Jávea, Spain; Clay $15,000; Singles and doubles draws	(Spain) Gerard Granollers (Spain) Pedro Martínez; 6–2, 6–2	(Russia) Ivan Gakhov (Spain) Sergio Martos Gornés	(Spain) Pedro Martínez (Spain) Javier Martí	(Spain) Carlos Boluda-Purkiss (Spain) Mario Vilella Martínez (Spain) Marc Giner (Spain) Carlos Taberner
March 13	Tunisia F10 Futures; Hammamet, Tunisia; Clay $15,000; Singles and doubles draws	(Spain) Oriol Roca Batalla; 7–6^{(7–3)}, 1–6, 6–0	(Italy) Stefano Travaglia	(France) Maxime Hamou (France) Geoffrey Blancaneaux	(Spain) Pol Toledo Bagué (Uruguay) Martín Cuevas (Brazil) Oscar José Gutierrez (Chile) Cristóbal Saavedra Corvalán
March 13	Tunisia F10 Futures; Hammamet, Tunisia; Clay $15,000; Singles and doubles draws	(Spain) Oriol Roca Batalla (Spain) Pol Toledo Bagué; 6–4, 7–6^{(7–5)}	(Brazil) Oscar José Gutierrez (Brazil) Nicolas Santos	(France) Maxime Hamou (France) Geoffrey Blancaneaux	(Spain) Pol Toledo Bagué (Uruguay) Martín Cuevas (Brazil) Oscar José Gutierrez (Chile) Cristóbal Saavedra Corvalán
March 13	Turkey F10 Futures; Antalya, Turkey; Clay $15,000; Singles and doubles draws	(Czech Republic) Václav Šafránek; 6–3, 6–3	(Brazil) Pedro Sakamoto	(Russia) Ivan Nedelko (Poland) Kamil Majchrzak	(United Kingdom) Jay Clarke (Turkey) Cem İlkel (Italy) Davide Galoppini (Brazil) Felipe Meligeni Alves
March 13	Turkey F10 Futures; Antalya, Turkey; Clay $15,000; Singles and doubles draws	(Turkey) Tuna Altuna (Turkey) Cem İlkel; 0–6, 6–2, [10–8]	(Belgium) Sander Gillé (Belgium) Joran Vliegen	(Russia) Ivan Nedelko (Poland) Kamil Majchrzak	(United Kingdom) Jay Clarke (Turkey) Cem İlkel (Italy) Davide Galoppini (Brazil) Felipe Meligeni Alves
March 20	Australia F3 Futures; Canberra, Australia; Clay $25,000; Singles and doubles draws	(Australia) Marc Polmans; 6–7^{(5–7)}, 7–6^{(7–1)}, 6–4	(Australia) Maverick Banes	(Spain) Jordi Samper Montaña (Australia) Jeremy Beale	(Australia) Gavin van Peperzeel (Australia) Blake Mott (United States) Evan King (Japan) Sora Fukuda
March 20	Australia F3 Futures; Canberra, Australia; Clay $25,000; Singles and doubles draws	(Australia) Bradley Mousley (Australia) Marc Polmans; 6–4, 7–6^{(7–4)}	(Australia) Steven de Waard (Australia) Scott Puodziunas	(Spain) Jordi Samper Montaña (Australia) Jeremy Beale	(Australia) Gavin van Peperzeel (Australia) Blake Mott (United States) Evan King (Japan) Sora Fukuda
March 20	Italy F5 Futures; Pula, Italy; Clay $25,000; Singles and doubles draws	(Italy) Marco Cecchinato; 6–4, 6–1	(Italy) Andrea Basso	(Russia) Alexey Vatutin (Romania) Adrian Ungur	(Italy) Jacopo Stefanini (Italy) Marco Bortolotti (Italy) Lorenzo Giustino (Croatia) Viktor Galović
March 20	Italy F5 Futures; Pula, Italy; Clay $25,000; Singles and doubles draws	(Italy) Andrea Basso (Croatia) Viktor Galović; 6–4, 6–4	(Romania) Dragoș Dima (Argentina) Juan Pablo Paz	(Russia) Alexey Vatutin (Romania) Adrian Ungur	(Italy) Jacopo Stefanini (Italy) Marco Bortolotti (Italy) Lorenzo Giustino (Croatia) Viktor Galović
March 20	USA F11 Futures; Calabasas, United States; Hard $25,000; Singles and doubles draws	(Germany) Sebastian Fanselow; 6–3, 6–2	(United States) Bradley Klahn	(United States) Mackenzie McDonald (United States) Marcos Giron	(Australia) Daniel Nolan (United States) Jared Hiltzik (United States) Tommy Paul (Brazil) Karue Sell
March 20	USA F11 Futures; Calabasas, United States; Hard $25,000; Singles and doubles draws	(United States) Bradley Klahn (United States) Connor Smith; 6–4, 6–7^{(5–7)}, [10–5]	(United Kingdom) Farris Fathi Gosea (United States) Alex Lawson	(United States) Mackenzie McDonald (United States) Marcos Giron	(Australia) Daniel Nolan (United States) Jared Hiltzik (United States) Tommy Paul (Brazil) Karue Sell
March 20	Bahrain F1 Futures; Manama, Bahrain; Hard $15,000; Singles and doubles draws	(Netherlands) Tallon Griekspoor; 6–4, 6–4	(Czech Republic) Michal Konečný	(Sweden) Markus Eriksson (Norway) Viktor Durasovic	(Zimbabwe) Benjamin Lock (Tunisia) Anis Ghorbel (Uzbekistan) Sanjar Fayziev (France) Baptiste Crepatte
March 20	Bahrain F1 Futures; Manama, Bahrain; Hard $15,000; Singles and doubles draws	(Sweden) Markus Eriksson (Sweden) Milos Sekulic; 6–3, 6–1	(Philippines) Francis Casey Alcantara (Zimbabwe) Benjamin Lock	(Sweden) Markus Eriksson (Norway) Viktor Durasovic	(Zimbabwe) Benjamin Lock (Tunisia) Anis Ghorbel (Uzbekistan) Sanjar Fayziev (France) Baptiste Crepatte
March 20	Croatia F3 Futures; Umag, Croatia; Clay $15,000; Singles and doubles draws	(Belgium) Yannick Vandenbulcke; 6–1, 6–2	(Japan) Naoki Nakagawa	(Austria) Jurij Rodionov (Montenegro) Ljubomir Čelebić	(Italy) Fabrizio Ornago (Russia) Alen Avidzba (Germany) Pascal Meis (Romania) Vasile Antonescu
March 20	Croatia F3 Futures; Umag, Croatia; Clay $15,000; Singles and doubles draws	(Czech Republic) Zdeněk Kolář (Croatia) Nino Serdarušić; 7–5, 6–0	(Argentina) Hernán Casanova (Argentina) Juan Pablo Ficovich	(Austria) Jurij Rodionov (Montenegro) Ljubomir Čelebić	(Italy) Fabrizio Ornago (Russia) Alen Avidzba (Germany) Pascal Meis (Romania) Vasile Antonescu
March 20	Egypt F10 Futures; Sharm El Sheikh; Hard $15,000; Singles and doubles draws	(Egypt) Karim-Mohamed Maamoun; 6–4, 6–2	(Czech Republic) Marek Gengel	(Egypt) Youssef Hossam (Switzerland) Johan Nikles	(Ukraine) Artem Smirnov (Netherlands) Jelle Sels (Italy) Julian Ocleppo (Italy) Francesco Vilardo
March 20	Egypt F10 Futures; Sharm El Sheikh; Hard $15,000; Singles and doubles draws	(Ukraine) Denys Molchanov (Ukraine) Artem Smirnov; 6–1, 6–2	(Netherlands) Gijs Brouwer (Netherlands) Jelle Sels	(Egypt) Youssef Hossam (Switzerland) Johan Nikles	(Ukraine) Artem Smirnov (Netherlands) Jelle Sels (Italy) Julian Ocleppo (Italy) Francesco Vilardo
March 20	France F7 Futures; Villers-lès-Nancy, France; Hard (indoor) $15,000; Singles and doubles draws	(France) Maxime Tabatruong; 4–6, 7–6^{(7–5)}, 6–4	(France) Albano Olivetti	(France) Antoine Hoang (Netherlands) Antal van der Duim	(France) Manuel Guinard (France) Grégoire Jacq (France) Evan Furness (Belgium) Niels Desein
March 20	France F7 Futures; Villers-lès-Nancy, France; Hard (indoor) $15,000; Singles and doubles draws	(France) Dan Added (France) Albano Olivetti; 6–4, 6–4	(Italy) Erik Crepaldi (France) Yannick Jankovits	(France) Antoine Hoang (Netherlands) Antal van der Duim	(France) Manuel Guinard (France) Grégoire Jacq (France) Evan Furness (Belgium) Niels Desein
March 20	Greece F3 Futures; Heraklion, Greece; Hard $15,000; Singles and doubles draws	(Czech Republic) Marek Jaloviec; 6–2, 7–5	(Chile) Marcelo Tomás Barrios Vera	(Slovakia) Alex Molčan (Czech Republic) Jaroslav Pospíšil	(Germany) Christian Hirschmüller (Uzbekistan) Temur Ismailov (Belarus) Dzmitry Zhyrmont (Bulgaria) Alexandar Lazov
March 20	Greece F3 Futures; Heraklion, Greece; Hard $15,000; Singles and doubles draws	(Chile) Marcelo Tomás Barrios Vera (France) Benjamin Bonzi; 4–6, 7–6^{(7–5)}, [10–7]	(Belarus) Yaraslav Shyla (Belarus) Dzmitry Zhyrmont	(Slovakia) Alex Molčan (Czech Republic) Jaroslav Pospíšil	(Germany) Christian Hirschmüller (Uzbekistan) Temur Ismailov (Belarus) Dzmitry Zhyrmont (Bulgaria) Alexandar Lazov
March 20	India F6 Futures; Thiruvananthapuram, India; Clay $15,000; Singles and doubles draws	(India) Prajnesh Gunneswaran; 7–5, 6–3	(India) Sriram Balaji	(India) Dalwinder Singh (India) Vishnu Vardhan	(India) Vijay Sundar Prashanth (India) Jayesh Pungliya (India) Haadin Bava (India) Ranjeet Virali-Murugesan
March 20	India F6 Futures; Thiruvananthapuram, India; Clay $15,000; Singles and doubles draws	(India) Sriram Balaji (India) Vishnu Vardhan; 6–3, 7–5	(Chinese Taipei) Hung Jui-chen (Hong Kong) Wong Hong Kit	(India) Dalwinder Singh (India) Vishnu Vardhan	(India) Vijay Sundar Prashanth (India) Jayesh Pungliya (India) Haadin Bava (India) Ranjeet Virali-Murugesan
March 20	Israel F2 Futures; Ramat HaSharon, Israel; Hard $15,000; Singles and doubles draws	(France) Enzo Couacaud; 7–5, 6–1	(Israel) Edan Leshem	(Israel) Igor Smilansky (Chinese Taipei) Chen Ti	(Israel) Dekel Bar (Germany) Tobias Simon (Lithuania) Laurynas Grigelis (China) Sun Fajing
March 20	Israel F2 Futures; Ramat HaSharon, Israel; Hard $15,000; Singles and doubles draws	(Israel) Dekel Bar (Hungary) Gábor Borsos; 6–4, 6–4	(Hungary) Viktor Filipenkó (Hungary) Levente Gödry	(Israel) Igor Smilansky (Chinese Taipei) Chen Ti	(Israel) Dekel Bar (Germany) Tobias Simon (Lithuania) Laurynas Grigelis (China) Sun Fajing
March 20	Japan F3 Futures; Kōfu, Japan; Hard $15,000; Singles and doubles draws	(Japan) Takuto Niki; 6–4, 4–0 ret.	(United States) Shane Vinsant	(South Korea) Lee Jea-moon (Vietnam) Lý Hoàng Nam	(South Korea) Oh Chan-yeong (Japan) Yusuke Takahashi (Thailand) Wishaya Trongcharoenchaikul (China) Gao Xin
March 20	Japan F3 Futures; Kōfu, Japan; Hard $15,000; Singles and doubles draws	(Japan) Katsuki Nagao (Japan) Hiromasa Oku; 6–4, 6–7^{(4–7)}, [10–3]	(Japan) Yuichi Ito (Japan) Jumpei Yamasaki	(South Korea) Lee Jea-moon (Vietnam) Lý Hoàng Nam	(South Korea) Oh Chan-yeong (Japan) Yusuke Takahashi (Thailand) Wishaya Trongcharoenchaikul (China) Gao Xin
March 20	Spain F8 Futures; Reus, Spain; Clay $15,000; Singles and doubles draws	(Spain) Javier Martí; 6–3, 6–4	(Russia) Ivan Gakhov	(Argentina) Pedro Cachin (Russia) Alexander Zhurbin	(Spain) Gerard Granollers (Spain) Oriol Roca Batalla (Spain) Carlos Boluda-Purkiss (Belgium) Germain Gigounon
March 20	Spain F8 Futures; Reus, Spain; Clay $15,000; Singles and doubles draws	(Spain) Sergio Martos Gornés (Chile) Cristóbal Saavedra Corvalán; 3–6, 7–6^{(9–7)}, [10–4]	(France) Jonathan Eysseric (Belgium) Germain Gigounon	(Argentina) Pedro Cachin (Russia) Alexander Zhurbin	(Spain) Gerard Granollers (Spain) Oriol Roca Batalla (Spain) Carlos Boluda-Purkiss (Belgium) Germain Gigounon
March 20	Tunisia F11 Futures; Hammamet, Tunisia; Clay $15,000; Singles and doubles draws	(France) Alexis Musialek; 6–1, 7–5	(France) Corentin Denolly	(Spain) Pol Toledo Bagué (Brazil) Nicolas Santos	(Morocco) Amine Ahouda (Italy) Alessandro Luisi (Brazil) Oscar José Gutierrez (Brazil) Fernando Yamacita
March 20	Tunisia F11 Futures; Hammamet, Tunisia; Clay $15,000; Singles and doubles draws	(Venezuela) Jordi Muñoz Abreu (Spain) Pol Toledo Bagué; 6–4, 6–1	(Hungary) Péter Balla (Japan) Shunsuke Wakita	(Spain) Pol Toledo Bagué (Brazil) Nicolas Santos	(Morocco) Amine Ahouda (Italy) Alessandro Luisi (Brazil) Oscar José Gutierrez (Brazil) Fernando Yamacita
March 20	Turkey F11 Futures; Antalya, Turkey; Clay $15,000; Singles and doubles draws	(Germany) Marvin Netuschil; 5–7, 7–5, 6–1	(Turkey) Cem İlkel	(Poland) Kamil Majchrzak (Russia) Ivan Nedelko	(United Kingdom) Jay Clarke (Brazil) Igor Marcondes (Bulgaria) Dimitar Kuzmanov (Argentina) Mariano Kestelboim
March 20	Turkey F11 Futures; Antalya, Turkey; Clay $15,000; Singles and doubles draws	(Turkey) Altuğ Çelikbilek (Peru) Mauricio Echazú; 7–5, 6–4	(Russia) Victor Baluda (Russia) Ilya Vasilyev	(Poland) Kamil Majchrzak (Russia) Ivan Nedelko	(United Kingdom) Jay Clarke (Brazil) Igor Marcondes (Bulgaria) Dimitar Kuzmanov (Argentina) Mariano Kestelboim
March 27	Italy F6 Futures; Pula, Italy; Clay $25,000; Singles and doubles draws	(Czech Republic) Václav Šafránek; 7–6^{(7–2)}, 6–7^{(7–9)}, 7–5	(Italy) Lorenzo Giustino	(Croatia) Viktor Galović (Greece) Stefanos Tsitsipas	(Romania) Adrian Ungur (Italy) Riccardo Balzerani (Italy) Walter Trusendi (France) Maxime Chazal
March 27	Italy F6 Futures; Pula, Italy; Clay $25,000; Singles and doubles draws	(Poland) Mateusz Kowalczyk (Poland) Grzegorz Panfil; 6–1, 7–6^{(7–5)}	(Argentina) Andrea Collarini (Argentina) Juan Pablo Paz	(Croatia) Viktor Galović (Greece) Stefanos Tsitsipas	(Romania) Adrian Ungur (Italy) Riccardo Balzerani (Italy) Walter Trusendi (France) Maxime Chazal
March 27	Spain F9 Futures; Madrid, Spain; Clay $25,000; Singles and doubles draws	(Italy) Stefano Travaglia; 6–1, 6–2	(Germany) Yannick Maden	(Argentina) Pedro Cachin (United Kingdom) Alexander Ward	(Spain) Bernabé Zapata Miralles (Spain) Juan Lizariturry (France) Maxime Hamou (Spain) Carlos Taberner
March 27	Spain F9 Futures; Madrid, Spain; Clay $25,000; Singles and doubles draws	(Argentina) Hernán Casanova (Bolivia) Federico Zeballos; 7–6^{(7–4)}, 6–1	(Spain) Álvaro López San Martín (United Kingdom) Alexander Ward	(Argentina) Pedro Cachin (United Kingdom) Alexander Ward	(Spain) Bernabé Zapata Miralles (Spain) Juan Lizariturry (France) Maxime Hamou (Spain) Carlos Taberner
March 27	Bahrain F2 Futures; Manama, Bahrain; Hard $15,000; Singles and doubles draws	(France) Mick Lescure; 7–5, 7–6^{(7–4)}	(Norway) Viktor Durasovic	(Germany) Florian Fallert (Slovenia) Tom Kočevar-Dešman	(France) Baptiste Crepatte (Zimbabwe) Benjamin Lock (Slovenia) Nik Razboršek (Czech Republic) Michal Konečný
March 27	Bahrain F2 Futures; Manama, Bahrain; Hard $15,000; Singles and doubles draws	(Philippines) Ruben Gonzales (Netherlands) Sem Verbeek; 6–3, 6–0	(Germany) Florian Fallert (Belgium) Jonas Merckx	(Germany) Florian Fallert (Slovenia) Tom Kočevar-Dešman	(France) Baptiste Crepatte (Zimbabwe) Benjamin Lock (Slovenia) Nik Razboršek (Czech Republic) Michal Konečný
March 27	Croatia F4 Futures; Opatija, Croatia; Clay $15,000; Singles and doubles draws	(Serbia) Laslo Đere; 7–5, 6–4	(Czech Republic) Zdeněk Kolář	(Austria) Michael Linzer (Bosnia and Herzegovina) Tomislav Brkić	(Ukraine) Denys Mylokostov (Montenegro) Ljubomir Čelebić (Croatia) Nino Serdarušić (Croatia) Mate Delić
March 27	Croatia F4 Futures; Opatija, Croatia; Clay $15,000; Singles and doubles draws	(Germany) Pascal Meis (Italy) Fabrizio Ornago; 6–3, 7–5	(Argentina) Juan Ignacio Cardini (Argentina) Ignacio Monzón	(Austria) Michael Linzer (Bosnia and Herzegovina) Tomislav Brkić	(Ukraine) Denys Mylokostov (Montenegro) Ljubomir Čelebić (Croatia) Nino Serdarušić (Croatia) Mate Delić
March 27	Egypt F11 Futures; Sharm El Sheikh, Egypt; Hard $15,000; Singles and doubles draws	(Egypt) Karim-Mohamed Maamoun; 6–4, 3–6, 6–4	(Czech Republic) Marek Gengel	(France) Thomas Bréchemier (Netherlands) Jelle Sels	(Germany) Charly Zick (Italy) Francesco Vilardo (Russia) Denis Matsukevich (Czech Republic) Tomáš Papík
March 27	Egypt F11 Futures; Sharm El Sheikh, Egypt; Hard $15,000; Singles and doubles draws	(Netherlands) Gijs Brouwer (Netherlands) Jelle Sels; 7–5, 6–1	(Poland) Piotr Matuszewski (Poland) Kacper Żuk	(France) Thomas Bréchemier (Netherlands) Jelle Sels	(Germany) Charly Zick (Italy) Francesco Vilardo (Russia) Denis Matsukevich (Czech Republic) Tomáš Papík
March 27	Greece F4 Futures; Heraklion, Greece; Hard $15,000; Singles and doubles draws	(Austria) Lenny Hampel; 6–2, 6–2	(Spain) Andrés Artuñedo	(United States) Liam Caruana (Denmark) Søren Hess-Olesen	(Austria) Sebastian Ofner (Slovakia) Alex Molčan (United States) Hunter Callahan (Chile) Marcelo Tomás Barrios Vera
March 27	Greece F4 Futures; Heraklion, Greece; Hard $15,000; Singles and doubles draws	(Slovakia) Lukáš Klein (Slovakia) Patrik Néma; 6–4, 6–2	(United States) Hunter Callahan (United States) Nicholas Hu	(United States) Liam Caruana (Denmark) Søren Hess-Olesen	(Austria) Sebastian Ofner (Slovakia) Alex Molčan (United States) Hunter Callahan (Chile) Marcelo Tomás Barrios Vera
March 27	Indonesia F4 Futures; Jakarta, Indonesia; Hard $15,000; Singles and doubles draws	(United Kingdom) Brydan Klein; 4–6, 6–2, 7–6^{(7–5)}	(Indonesia) Christopher Rungkat	(Japan) Kento Takeuchi (Chinese Taipei) Chiu Yu-hsiang	(Thailand) Kittipong Wachiramanowong (Spain) José Francisco Vidal Azorín (Australia) Dane Propoggia (India) Karunuday Singh
March 27	Indonesia F4 Futures; Jakarta, Indonesia; Hard $15,000; Singles and doubles draws	(Indonesia) Justin Barki (Indonesia) Christopher Rungkat; 6–3, 7–6^{(7–1)}	(Germany) Pirmin Hänle (India) Karunuday Singh	(Japan) Kento Takeuchi (Chinese Taipei) Chiu Yu-hsiang	(Thailand) Kittipong Wachiramanowong (Spain) José Francisco Vidal Azorín (Australia) Dane Propoggia (India) Karunuday Singh
March 27	Israel F3 Futures; Tel Aviv, Israel; Hard $15,000; Singles and doubles draws	(Israel) Edan Leshem; 6–4, 6–1	(Argentina) Matías Franco Descotte	(Hungary) Viktor Filipenkó (Israel) Ben Patael	(Israel) Dekel Bar (United States) Peter Kobelt (Israel) Mor Bulis (United States) Raleigh Smith
March 27	Israel F3 Futures; Tel Aviv, Israel; Hard $15,000; Singles and doubles draws	(Argentina) Matías Franco Descotte (Chile) Juan Carlos Sáez; 6–4, 6–4	(Hungary) Gábor Borsos (Hungary) Viktor Filipenkó	(Hungary) Viktor Filipenkó (Israel) Ben Patael	(Israel) Dekel Bar (United States) Peter Kobelt (Israel) Mor Bulis (United States) Raleigh Smith
March 27	Japan F4 Futures; Tsukuba, Japan; Hard $15,000; Singles and doubles draws	(Japan) Yusuke Takahashi; 6–2, 6–2	(Japan) Takuto Niki	(Japan) Kaito Uesugi (South Korea) Hong Seong-chan	(Japan) Renta Tokuda (Chinese Taipei) Wu Tung-lin (Japan) Yosuke Watanuki (Japan) Ryota Tanuma
March 27	Japan F4 Futures; Tsukuba, Japan; Hard $15,000; Singles and doubles draws	(Japan) Hiroyasu Ehara (Japan) Sho Katayama; 2–6, 6–3, [10–6]	(Japan) Shintaro Imai (Japan) Kaito Uesugi	(Japan) Kaito Uesugi (South Korea) Hong Seong-chan	(Japan) Renta Tokuda (Chinese Taipei) Wu Tung-lin (Japan) Yosuke Watanuki (Japan) Ryota Tanuma
March 27	Portugal F4 Futures; Lisbon, Portugal; Hard $15,000; Singles and doubles draws	(Poland) Hubert Hurkacz; 7–5, 6–1	(Portugal) João Domingues	(Belgium) Yannick Mertens (Italy) Alessandro Bega	(Portugal) Fred Gil (Spain) David Vega Hernández (France) Sébastien Boltz (Portugal) João Monteiro
March 27	Portugal F4 Futures; Lisbon, Portugal; Hard $15,000; Singles and doubles draws	(Portugal) Felipe Cunha e Silva (Portugal) João Monteiro; 6–3, 7–5	(Belgium) Yannick Mertens (Spain) David Vega Hernández	(Belgium) Yannick Mertens (Italy) Alessandro Bega	(Portugal) Fred Gil (Spain) David Vega Hernández (France) Sébastien Boltz (Portugal) João Monteiro
March 27	Tunisia F12 Futures; Hammamet, Tunisia; Clay $15,000; Singles and doubles draws	(Spain) Pol Toledo Bagué; 2–6, 7–6^{(9–7)}, 6–3	(Morocco) Lamine Ouahab	(Chile) Cristóbal Saavedra Corvalán (Portugal) Gonçalo Oliveira	(France) Florent Diep (France) Corentin Denolly (Germany) Peter Torebko (Chile) Bastián Malla
March 27	Tunisia F12 Futures; Hammamet, Tunisia; Clay $15,000; Singles and doubles draws	(Portugal) Gonçalo Oliveira (Morocco) Lamine Ouahab; 6–1, 6–1	(Argentina) Juan Ignacio Londero (Chile) Cristóbal Saavedra Corvalán	(Chile) Cristóbal Saavedra Corvalán (Portugal) Gonçalo Oliveira	(France) Florent Diep (France) Corentin Denolly (Germany) Peter Torebko (Chile) Bastián Malla
March 27	Turkey F12 Futures; Antalya, Turkey; Clay $15,000; Singles and doubles draws	(Russia) Ivan Nedelko; 6–2, 2–6, 6–4	(Belgium) Julien Cagnina	(Latvia) Mārtiņš Podžus (Germany) Marvin Netuschil	(Turkey) Marsel İlhan (Russia) Ilya Vasilyev (Argentina) Santiago Rodríguez Taverna (Russia) Aleksandr Vasilenko
March 27	Turkey F12 Futures; Antalya, Turkey; Clay $15,000; Singles and doubles draws	(Romania) Victor-Mugurel Anagnastopol (Romania) Victor Vlad Cornea; 6–2, 6–2	(Argentina) Mariano Kestelboim (Argentina) Alejo Vilaró	(Latvia) Mārtiņš Podžus (Germany) Marvin Netuschil	(Turkey) Marsel İlhan (Russia) Ilya Vasilyev (Argentina) Santiago Rodríguez Taverna (Russia) Aleksandr Vasilenko
