= 2019 Tampere Open – Men's singles =

Men's singles
- 2019 Tampere Open

Final
- Champion: (Sweden) Mikael Ymer
- Runner-up: (Netherlands) Tallon Griekspoor
- Score: 6–3, 5–7, 6–3

Events
Singles	men	women
Doubles	men	women
- Tampere Open

Tallon Griekspoor was the defending champion but lost in the final to Mikael Ymer.

Ymer won the title after defeating Griekspoor 6–3, 5–7, 6–3 in the final.

== Seeds ==
All seeds receive a bye into the second round.

1. (Portugal) Pedro Sousa (semifinals, retired)
2. (Sweden) Elias Ymer (quarterfinals)
3. (Sweden) Mikael Ymer (champion)
4. (Belgium) Kimmer Coppejans (quarterfinals)
5. (Slovenia) Blaž Rola (semifinals)
6. (Italy) Federico Gaio (second round)
7. (Argentina) Federico Coria (quarterfinals)
8. (Slovakia) Filip Horanský (third round)
9. (Netherlands) Tallon Griekspoor (final)
10. (Ecuador) Roberto Quiroz (second round)
11. (Serbia) Peđa Krstin (quarterfinals)
12. (Czech Republic) Zdeněk Kolář (second round)
13. (Italy) Matteo Viola (second round)
14. (Portugal) Gonçalo Oliveira (second round)
15. (Estonia) Jürgen Zopp (second round)
16. (Finland) Emil Ruusuvuori (third round)

== Draw ==
Key

- Q = Qualifier
- WC = Wild card
- LL = Lucky loser
- Alt = Alternate
- ITF = ITF entry
- PR = Protected ranking
- SR = Special ranking
- SE = Special exempt
- JE = Junior exempt
- JR = Junior Accelerator Programme entrant
- CO = College Accelerator Programme entrant
- NG = Next Gen Accelerator Program entrant
- w/o = Walkover
- r = Retired
- d = Defaulted

=== Finals ===
Quarterfinals
1	(Portugal) Pedro Sousa	6	6
7	(Argentina) Federico Coria	4	2
4/SE	(Belgium) Kimmer Coppejans	2	4
9	(Netherlands) Tallon Griekspoor	6	6
11	(Serbia) Peđa Krstin	6	1	6^{5}
3	(Sweden) Mikael Ymer	2	6	7^{7}
5	(Slovenia) Blaž Rola	6	7^{7}
2	(Sweden) Elias Ymer	1	6^{3}

Semifinals
1	(Portugal) Pedro Sousa	6^{1}	0^{r}
9	(Netherlands) Tallon Griekspoor	7^{7}	0
3	(Sweden) Mikael Ymer	6^{4}	7	7
5	(Slovenia) Blaž Rola	7^{7}	5	5

Final
9	(Netherlands) Tallon Griekspoor	3	7	3
3	(Sweden) Mikael Ymer	6	5	6

=== Top half ===
==== Section 1 ====
First round
Q	(Russia) A Zhurbin	6	6
ITF	(Belgium) Christopher Heyman	4	2
ITF	(Russia) I Nedelko	6	3	6
WC	(Finland) H Heliövaara	4	6	1
(Israel) B Patael	3	0^{r}
(France) S Doumbia	6	0
(Argentina) R Olivo	7	6^{5}	6
(Russia) I Gakhov	5	7^{7}	4

Second round
1	(Portugal) P Sousa	6	3	6
Q	(Russia) A Zhurbin	3	6	1
ITF	(Russia) I Nedelko	6	6^{2}	6
15	(Estonia) J Zopp	2	7^{7}	2
12	(Czech Republic) Z Kolář	1	6	4
(France) S Doumbia	6	4	6
(Argentina) R Olivo	5	7^{7}	3
7	(Argentina) F Coria	7	6^{4}	6

Third round
1	(Portugal) P Sousa	6	6
ITF	(Russia) I Nedelko	1	0
(France) S Doumbia	2	3
7	(Argentina) F Coria	6	6

Quarterfinals
1	(Portugal) P Sousa	6	6
7	(Argentina) F Coria	4	2

==== Section 2 ====
First round
WC	(Finland) Panu Virtanen	6^{3}	1
(Germany) B Hassan	7^{7}	6
Q	(France) F Reboul	6^{2}	2
ITF	(Belgium) Jeroen Vanneste	7^{7}	6
(Italy) A Vavassori	2	2
(Russia) A Karatsev	6	6
(France) M Guinard	6	6
(Sweden) M Eriksson	4	1

Second round
4/SE	(Belgium) K Coppejans	6	6
(Germany) B Hassan	3	3
ITF	(Belgium) J Vanneste	6	7^{7}
14	(Portugal) G Oliveira	3	6^{5}
9	(Netherlands) T Griekspoor	3	6	6
(Russia) A Karatsev	6	4	3
(France) M Guinard	7^{9}	2	6^{4}
8	(Slovakia) F Horanský	6^{7}	6	7^{7}

Third round
4/SE	(Belgium) K Coppejans	6^{6}	6	6
ITF	(Belgium) J Vanneste	7^{8}	1	0
9	(Netherlands) T Griekspoor	6	1	6
8	(Slovakia) F Horanský	4	6	3

Quarterfinals
4/SE	(Belgium) K Coppejans	2	4
9	(Netherlands) T Griekspoor	6	6

=== Bottom half ===
==== Section 3 ====
First round
(Brazil) G Clezar	6	6
(Hungary) Z Piros	3	4
ITF	(Australia) C O'Connell	7	6
(Uzbekistan) K Sultanov	5	4
(Italy) A Bega	6	6^{5}	6^{4}
WC	(Finland) P Niklas-Salminen	4	7^{7}	7^{7}
ITF	(Netherlands) B van de Zandschulp	6	6
(Serbia) M Zekić	4	2

Second round
6	(Italy) F Gaio	3	5
(Brazil) G Clezar	6	7
ITF	(Australia) C O'Connell	4	6	3
11	(Serbia) P Krstin	6	1	6
13	(Italy) M Viola	6	4	1
WC	(Finland) P Niklas-Salminen	1	6	6
ITF	(Netherlands) B van de Zandschulp	4	6	2
3	(Sweden) M Ymer	6	2	6

Third round
(Brazil) G Clezar	6^{3}	1
11	(Serbia) P Krstin	7^{7}	6
WC	(Finland) P Niklas-Salminen	4	6	3
3	(Sweden) M Ymer	6	4	6

Quarterfinals
11	(Serbia) P Krstin	6	1	6^{5}
3	(Sweden) M Ymer	2	6	7^{7}

==== Section 4 ====
First round
(Bulgaria) D Kuzmanov	4	6	7
(Italy) A Pellegrino	6	3	5
(Uruguay) M Cuevas	5	0
(Portugal) G Elias	7	6
(Norway) V Durasovic	2	7	6
WC	(Finland) Roni Rikkonen	6	5	0
WC	(Finland) E Vasa	6	6
(Romania) D Dima	4	4

Second round
5	(Slovenia) B Rola	6	2
(Bulgaria) D Kuzmanov	2	1^{r}
(Portugal) G Elias	6^{8}	6	6
10	(Ecuador) R Quiroz	7^{10}	3	3
16	(Finland) E Ruusuvuori	6	5	6
(Norway) V Durasovic	1	7	4
WC	(Finland) E Vasa	1	0
2	(Sweden) E Ymer	6	6

Third round
5	(Slovenia) B Rola	6	6
(Portugal) G Elias	1	4
16	(Finland) E Ruusuvuori	2	6	3
2	(Sweden) E Ymer	6	4	6

Quarterfinals
5	(Slovenia) B Rola	6	7^{7}
2	(Sweden) E Ymer	1	6^{3}
