= 2019 Tampere Open – Men's doubles =

Men's doubles
- 2019 Tampere Open

Final
- Champions: (Netherlands) Sander Arends (Netherlands) David Pel
- Runners-up: (Russia) Ivan Nedelko (Russia) Alexander Zhurbin
- Score: 6–0, 6–2

Events
Singles	men	women
Doubles	men	women
- Tampere Open

Markus Eriksson and André Göransson were the defending champions but only Eriksson chose to defend his title, partnering Tuna Altuna. Eriksson lost in the quarterfinals to Sander Arends and David Pel.

Arends and Pel won the title after defeating Ivan Nedelko and Alexander Zhurbin 6–0, 6–2 in the final.

== Seeds ==
1. (Netherlands) Sander Arends / (Netherlands) David Pel (champions)
2. (Czech Republic) Zdeněk Kolář / (Portugal) Gonçalo Oliveira (quarterfinals)
3. (Italy) Andrea Pellegrino / (Italy) Andrea Vavassori (first round)
4. (Sweden) Andreas Siljeström / (Sweden) Elias Ymer (quarterfinals)

== Draw ==
Key

- Q = Qualifier
- WC = Wild card
- LL = Lucky loser
- Alt = Alternate
- ITF = ITF entry
- PR = Protected ranking
- SR = Special ranking
- SE = Special exempt
- JE = Junior exempt
- JR = Junior Accelerator Programme entrant
- CO = College Accelerator Programme entrant
- NG = Next Gen Accelerator Program entrant
- w/o = Walkover
- r = Retired
- d = Defaulted

First round
1	(Netherlands) S Arends (Netherlands) D Pel	6	7^{7}
(United States) H Johnson (United States) Y Johnson	4	6^{3}
(Turkey) T Altuna (Sweden) M Eriksson	6	6
(Argentina) F Coria (Uruguay) M Cuevas	4	3
3	(Italy) A Pellegrino (Italy) A Vavassori	7	6^{3}	[8]
(Finland) H Heliövaara (Finland) P Niklas-Salminen	5	7^{7}	[10]
WC	(Finland) Patrick Kaukovalta (Finland) E Vasa	6	6
ITF	(France) S Doumbia (France) F Reboul	3	4
WC	(Russia) I Nedelko (Russia) A Zhurbin	2	6	[10]
WC	(Finland) Roni Rikkonen (Finland) Ilari Vesanen	6	1	[5]
Alt	(Russia) Anton Chekhov (Uzbekistan) K Sultanov	6^{4}	4
4	(Sweden) A Siljeström (Sweden) E Ymer	7^{7}	6
ITF	(Belgium) Christopher Heyman (Australia) C O'Connell	5	6	[8]
(Portugal) G Elias (Portugal) P Sousa	7	1	[10]
(Italy) A Bega (Russia) A Karatsev	3	4
2	(Czech Republic) Z Kolář (Portugal) G Oliveira	6	6

Quarterfinals
1	(Netherlands) S Arends (Netherlands) D Pel	6	6
(Turkey) T Altuna (Sweden) M Eriksson	4	3
(Finland) H Heliövaara (Finland) P Niklas-Salminen	6	7^{7}
WC	(Finland) P Kaukovalta (Finland) E Vasa	3	6^{2}
WC	(Russia) I Nedelko (Russia) A Zhurbin	3	6	[10]
4	(Sweden) A Siljeström (Sweden) E Ymer	6	1	[7]
(Portugal) G Elias (Portugal) P Sousa	3	6	[10]
2	(Czech Republic) Z Kolář (Portugal) G Oliveira	6	4	[3]

Semifinals
1	(Netherlands) S Arends (Netherlands) D Pel	7^{7}	4	[10]
(Finland) H Heliövaara (Finland) P Niklas-Salminen	6^{3}	6	[1]
WC	(Russia) I Nedelko (Russia) A Zhurbin	w/o
(Portugal) G Elias (Portugal) P Sousa

Final
1	(Netherlands) S Arends (Netherlands) D Pel	6	6
WC	(Russia) I Nedelko (Russia) A Zhurbin	0	2
