= 2019 Tampere Open =

- Date: 22–28 July
- Edition: 38th (men); 13th (women)
- Category: ATP Challenger Tour; ITF Women's Circuit
- Surface: Clay (men); Hard / Indoor (women)
- Location: Tampere, Finland

Champions

Men's singles
- (Sweden) Mikael Ymer

Women's singles
- (Finland) Anastasia Kulikova

Men's doubles
- (Netherlands) Sander Arends / (Netherlands) David Pel

Women's doubles
- (Russia) Polina Bakhmutkina / (Russia) Noel Saidenova
- Tampere Open

The 2019 Tampere Open was a professional tennis tournament played on clay courts for men and indoor hard courts for women. It was the 38th edition of the tournament which was part of the 2019 ATP Challenger Tour and the 2019 ITF Women's World Tennis Tour. It took place in Tampere, Finland, on 22–28 July 2019.

== Men's singles main draw entrants ==
=== Seeds ===
Country	Player	Rank^{1}	Seed
POR	Pedro Sousa	109	1
SWE	Elias Ymer	116	2
SWE	Mikael Ymer	124	3
BEL	Kimmer Coppejans	144	4
SLO	Blaž Rola	164	5
ITA	Federico Gaio	171	6
ARG	Federico Coria	174	7
SVK	Filip Horanský	175	8
NED	Tallon Griekspoor	190	9
ECU	Roberto Quiroz	238	10
SRB	Peđa Krstin	241	11
CZE	Zdeněk Kolář	245	12
ITA	Matteo Viola	247	13
POR	Gonçalo Oliveira	260	14
EST	Jürgen Zopp	271	15
FIN	Emil Ruusuvuori	299	16

- ^{1} Rankings as of 15 July 2019.

=== Other entrants ===
The following players received wildcards into the singles main draw:

- (Finland) Harri Heliövaara
- (Finland) Patrik Niklas-Salminen
- (Finland) Roni Rikkonen
- (Finland) Eero Vasa
- (Finland) Panu Virtanen

The following player received entry into the singles main draw as a special exempt:

- (Belgium) Kimmer Coppejans

The following players received entry into the singles main draw using their ITF World Tennis Ranking:

- (Belgium) Christopher Heyman
- (Russia) Ivan Nedelko
- (Australia) Christopher O'Connell
- (Netherlands) Botic van de Zandschulp
- (Belgium) Jeroen Vanneste

The following players received entry from the qualifying draw:

- (France) Fabien Reboul
- (Russia) Alexander Zhurbin

== Women's singles main draw entrants ==
=== Seeds ===
Country	Player	Rank^{1}	Seed
SVK	Michaela Hončová	534	1
JPN	Naoko Eto	844	2
AUS	Isabella Bozicevic	847	3
JPN	Himari Satō	847	4
FIN	Anastasia Kulikova	58 (ITF)	5
ISR	Tamara Barad Itzhaki	294 (ITF)	6
~~NED~~	~~Dominique Karregat~~	~~325 (ITF)~~	~~7~~
CAN	Maria Tanasescu	355 (ITF)	8

- ^{1} Rankings as of 15 July 2019.
- (ITF): ITF World Tennis Ranking.

=== Other entrants ===
The following players received wildcards into the singles main draw:

- (Finland) Emma Eerola
- (Finland) Emilia Hartman
- (Finland) Lotta Heiskanen
- (Estonia) Katriin Saar

The following players received entry from the qualifying draw:

- (Estonia) Sofiya Chekhlystova
- (Denmark) Elena Jamshidi
- (Estonia) Maria Lota Kaul
- (Russia) Evgeniya Levashova
- (Russia) Sofiia Likhacheva
- (Russia) Vilena Petrova

The following player received entry as a lucky loser:

- (Sweden) Maria Fernanda Morales

== Champions ==
=== Men's singles ===
- (Sweden) Mikael Ymer def. (Netherlands) Tallon Griekspoor 6–3, 5–7, 6–3.

=== Women's singles ===
- (Finland) Anastasia Kulikova def. (Belgium) Victoria Kalaitzis, 6–4, 6–7^{(2–7)}, 6–3

=== Men's doubles ===
- (Netherlands) Sander Arends / (Netherlands) David Pel def. (Russia) Ivan Nedelko / (Russia) Alexander Zhurbin 6–0, 6–2.

=== Women's doubles ===
- (Russia) Polina Bakhmutkina / (Russia) Noel Saidenova def. (Australia) Isabella Bozicevic / (Finland) Anastasia Kulikova, 6–2, 6–3
