= Ivan Nedelko =

Russian tennis player

Ivan Nedelko Иван Неделько
- Country (sports): Russia
- Born: 12 May 1986 (age 40) Saint Petersburg, Russia
- Height: 1.85 m (6 ft 1 in)
- Turned pro: 2006
- Plays: Right-handed (two-handed backhand)
- Prize money: US $337,531

Singles
- Career record: 0–2
- Career titles: 0
- Highest ranking: No. 235 (23 July 2018)
- Current ranking: No. 895 (29 December 2025)

Grand Slam singles results
- Wimbledon: Q1 (2018)
- US Open: Q1 (2018)

Doubles
- Career record: 0–0
- Career titles: 0
- Highest ranking: No. 449 (29 July 2019)
- Current ranking: No. 1,809 (29 December 2025)
- Last updated on: 29 December 2025.

Ivan Anatolyevich Nedelko (Ива́н Анато́льевич Неде́лько; born 12 May 1986) is a Russian professional tennis player. He has a career-high ATP singles ranking of No. 235, achieved on 23 July 2018 and a best doubles ranking of No. 449, reached on 29 July 2019.

== Career ==
Nedelko made his ATP main draw debut at the 2011 St. Petersburg Open in the singles draw where he lost to Potito Starace.

== ATP Challenger Tour finals ==
=== Doubles: 1 (runner-up) ===
Legend ATP Challenger Tour (0–1)

Result	W–L	Date	Tournament	Tier	Surface	Partner	Opponents	Score
Loss	0–1	Jul 2019	Tampere Open, Finland	Challenger	Clay	(Russia) Alexander Zhurbin	(Netherlands) Sander Arends (Netherlands) David Pel	0–6, 2–6

== ITF Tour finals ==
=== Singles: 49 (29 titles, 20 runner-ups) ===
Legend ITF Futures/WTT (29–20)	Finals by surface Hard (3–1) Clay (26–19)

Result	W–L	Date	Tournament	Tier	Surface	Opponent	Score
Loss	0–1	May 2010	Spain F17, Valldoreix	Futures	Clay	(Portugal) João Sousa	0–6, 3–6
Loss	0–2	Jun 2011	Iran F1, Tehran	Futures	Clay	(Italy) Matteo Marrai	3–6, 1–6
Loss	0–3	Jun 2011	Iran F2, Tehran	Futures	Clay	(Italy) Matteo Marrai	2–6, 3–6
Loss	0–4	Aug 2011	Russia F6, Moscow	Futures	Clay	(Russia) Evgeny Kirillov	5–7, 5–7
Loss	0–5	Apr 2013	Egypt F3, Sharm El Sheikh	Futures	Clay	(Egypt) Mohamed Safwat	4–6, 2–6
Win	1–5	May 2013	Egypt F7, Sharm El Sheikh	Futures	Clay	(Czech Republic) Jan Blecha	6–1, 6–1
Loss	1–6	Jul 2013	Estonia F1, Tallinn	Futures	Clay	(France) Lucas Pouille	2–6, 1–6
Loss	1–7	May 2014	Ukraine F5, Rivne	Futures	Clay	(Germany) Richard Becker	0–6, 6–2, 5–7
Loss	1–8	Jun 2014	Ukraine F6, Rivne	Futures	Clay	(Spain) Marc Giner	2–6, 6–4, 5–7
Loss	1–9	May 2015	Ukraine F3, Cherkassy	Futures	Clay	(Ukraine) Artem Smirnov	1–6, 6–2, 1–6
Loss	1–10	Jun 2015	Russia F2, Kazan	Futures	Clay	(Estonia) Vladimir Ivanov	6–4, 4–6, 1–6
Win	2–10	Jun 2015	Bulgaria F3, Blagoevgrad	Futures	Clay	(France) Grégoire Jacq	3–6, 6–4, 6–2
Win	3–10	Jul 2015	Turkey F28, Ankara	Futures	Clay	(Bulgaria) Vasko Mladenov	7–5, 6–3
Win	4–10	Aug 2015	Tunisia F19, Port El Kantaoui	Futures	Hard	(Bulgaria) Dimitar Kuzmanov	walkover
Win	5–10	Sep 2015	Iran F9, Tehran	Futures	Clay	(Germany) Leon Schutt	6–3, 6–2
Win	6–10	Oct 2015	Ukraine F5, Cherkassy	Futures	Clay	(Ukraine) Volodymyr Uzhylovskyi	6–3, 6–3
Win	7–10	Oct 2015	Ukraine F6, Cherkassy	Futures	Clay	(Bulgaria) Vasko Mladenov	7–5, 6–4
Win	8–10	Feb 2016	Tunisia F5, Hammamet	Futures	Clay	(Spain) Pol Toledo Bagué	6–0, 7–5
Win	9–10	May 2016	Ukraine F3, Cherkassy	Futures	Clay	(Ukraine) Denys Mylokostov	4–6, 6–2, 6–3
Win	10–10	Aug 2016	Finland F2, Hyvinkää	Futures	Clay	(Netherlands) Tallon Griekspoor	6–1, 4–6, 7–6^{(8–6)}
Loss	10–11	Jan 2017	Tunisia F1, Hammamet	Futures	Clay	(Hungary) Attila Balázs	3–6, 1–6
Win	11–11	Apr 2017	Turkey F12, Antalya	Futures	Clay	(Belgium) Julien Cagnina	6–2, 2–6, 6–4
Loss	11–12	Aug 2017	Turkey F31, Istanbul	Futures	Clay	(Argentina) Patricio Heras	6–3, 1–6, 4–6
Win	12–12	Sep 2017	Ukraine F5, Kremenchuk	Futures	Clay	(Russia) Yan Sabanin	6–0, 6–0
Loss	12–13	Oct 2017	Turkey F40, Antalya	Futures	Clay	(Spain) Javier Martí	4–6, 6–3, 1–6
Win	13–13	Dec 2017	Pakistan F1, Islamabad	Futures	Clay	(Spain) Pere Riba	6–3, 6–4
Loss	13–14	Dec 2017	Pakistan F2, Islamabad	Futures	Clay	(Spain) Enrique López Pérez	6–7^{(1–7)}, 1–6
Win	14–14	Dec 2017	Pakistan F3, Islamabad	Futures	Clay	(Spain) Enrique López Pérez	6–4, 7–6^{(7–4)}
Win	15–14	Mar 2018	Turkey F10, Antalya	Futures	Clay	(Peru) Juan Pablo Varillas	6–2, 7–6^{(7–3)}
Win	16–14	Mar 2018	Turkey F11, Antalya	Futures	Clay	(Argentina) Genaro Alberto Olivieri	6–4, 6–1
Win	17–14	May 2018	Uganda F1, Kampala	Futures	Clay	(United Kingdom) George Loffhagen	6–4, 6–4
Loss	17–15	May 2018	Uganda F2, Kampala	Futures	Clay	(Italy) Fabrizio Ornago	6–7^{(6–8)}, 3–6
Win	18–15	May 2018	Uganda F3, Kampala	Futures	Clay	(Spain) David Pérez Sanz	6–0, 6–3
Win	19–15	May 2018	Uganda F4, Kampala	Futures	Clay	(United States) Tyler Lu	6–4, 6–4
Win	20–15	Dec 2018	Turkey F41, Antalya	Futures	Clay	(Spain) Oriol Roca Batalla	1–6, 7–6^{(7–3)}, 6–3
Win	21–15	Mar 2019	M15 Antalya, Turkey	WTT	Clay	(Kazakhstan) Dmitry Popko	6–4, 5–7, 6–2
Loss	21–16	Mar 2019	M15 Antalya, Turkey	WTT	Clay	(Brazil) Felipe Meligeni Alves	7–6^{(7–5)}, 5–7, ret.
Win	22–16	May 2019	M15 Antalya, Turkey	WTT	Clay	(Turkey) Ergi Kırkın	6–3, 6–3
Win	23–16	May 2019	M15 Kampala, Uganda	WTT	Clay	(Republic of Ireland) Simon Carr	6–2, 6–4
Win	24–16	May 2019	M15 Kampala, Uganda	WTT	Clay	(Lithuania) Julius Tverijonas	6–1, 6–4
Win	25–16	May 2019	M15 Kampala, Uganda	WTT	Clay	(Lebanon) Giovani Samaha	6–3, 1–1 ret.
Win	26–16	Jul 2019	M15 Vilnius, Lithuania	WTT	Clay	(Russia) Savriyan Danilov	6–4, 5–7, 6–1
Win	27–16	Sep 2019	M15 Antalya, Turkey	WTT	Clay	(Czech Republic) Michael Vrbenský	3–6, 6–4, 6–4
Win	28–16	Apr 2021	M15 Saint Petersburg, Russia	WTT	Hard	(Ukraine) Illya Beloborodko	2–6, 7–5, 6–4
Loss	28–17	Sep 2021	M15 Vyshkovo, Ukraine	WTT	Clay	(Hungary) Gergely Madarász	6–7^{(1–7)}, 6–3, 4–6
Win	29–17	May 2022	M15 Kouvola, Finland	WTT	Hard	(Finland) Otto Virtanen	4–6, 6–3, 6–4
Loss	29–18	Jun 2022	M15 Vaasa, Finland	WTT	Hard	(Sweden) Karl Friberg	6–4, 3–6, 1–6
Loss	29–19	Sep 2024	M15 Tehran, Iran	WTT	Clay	(Italy) Lorenzo Bocchi	6–1, 3–6, 5–7
Loss	29–20	Dec 2025	M15 Antalya, Turkey	WTT	Clay	(Italy) Samuele Pieri	1–6, 1–6

=== Doubles: 16 (2 titles, 14 runner-ups) ===
Legend ITF Futures/WTT (2–14)	Finals by surface Hard (–) Clay (2–14)

Result	W–L	Date	Tournament	Tier	Surface	Partner	Opponents	Score
Loss	0–1	Mar 2010	Spain F9, Badalona	Futures	Clay	(Spain) Roberto Rodríguez-Alonso	(Spain) Ignacio Coll Riudavets (Spain) Gerard Granollers Pujol	4–6, 2–6
Win	1–1	Nov 2010	Sudan F1, Khartoum	Futures	Clay	(Spain) Jordi Muñoz Abreu	(Bosnia and Herzegovina) Aldin Šetkić (Serbia) David Savić	2–6, 6–4, [11–9]
Loss	1–2	Jun 2011	Iran F2, Tehran	Futures	Clay	(Greece) Paris Gemouchidis	(Italy) Matteo Marrai (Germany) Alexander Satschko	2–6, 4–6
Loss	1–3	Jul 2011	Turkey F20, İzmir	Futures	Clay	(Moldova) Andrei Ciumac	(Greece) Paris Gemouchidis (Greece) Alexandros Jakupovic	walkover
Loss	1–4	Jul 2012	Russia F9, Kazan	Futures	Clay	(Russia) Anton Zaitcev	(Belarus) Andrei Vasilevski (Belarus) Egor Gerasimov	4–6, 4–6
Loss	1–5	Jul 2012	Estonia F2, Kuressaare	Futures	Clay	(Estonia) Vladimir Ivanov	(Netherlands) Jeroen Benard (Netherlands) Mark Vervoort	6–4, 6–7^{(4–7)}, [5–10]
Loss	1–6	Aug 2012	Lithuania F1, Vilnius	Futures	Clay	(Estonia) Vladimir Ivanov	(Netherlands) Mark Vervoort (Greece) Theodoros Angelinos	walkover
Loss	1–7	Apr 2013	Egypt F3, Sharm El Sheikh	Futures	Clay	(Estonia) Vladimir Ivanov	(Austria) Gibril Diarra (Austria) Tristan-Samuel Weissborn	6–7^{(7–9)}, 6–3, [11–13]
Loss	1–8	Oct 2013	Egypt F28, Sharm El Sheikh	Futures	Clay	(Turkey) Tuna Altuna	(Tunisia) Skander Mansouri (Colombia) Cristian Rodríguez	3–6, 1–6
Loss	1–9	Nov 2013	Egypt F33, Sharm El Sheikh	Futures	Clay	(Russia) Maxim Kravtsov	(Belgium) Romain Barbosa (Portugal) Frederico Ferreira Silva	6–4, 1–6, [5–10]
Loss	1–10	Apr 2014	Kazakhstan F6, Shymkent	Futures	Clay	(Estonia) Vladimir Ivanov	(Belarus) Andrei Vasilevski (Belarus) Yaraslav Shyla	6–7^{(6–8)}, 0–6
Loss	1–11	Jun 2014	Ukraine F6, Rivne	Futures	Clay	(Ukraine) Vladyslav Manafov	(Ukraine) Vadim Alekseenko (Ukraine) Stanislav Poplavskyy	1–6, 6–0, [3–10]
Loss	1–12	Mar 2016	Tunisia F10, Hammamet	Futures	Clay	(Finland) Henrik Sillanpää	(Austria) Lenny Hampel (Russia) Roman Safiullin	1–6, 3–6
Loss	1–13	Dec 2016	Egypt F37, Cairo	Futures	Clay	(Ukraine) Oleg Khotkov	(India) Chandril Sood (India) Lakshit Sood	6–1, 6–7^{(7–9)}, [5–10]
Loss	1–14	Nov 2018	Turkey F34, Antalya	Futures	Clay	(Russia) Mikhail Korovin	(Spain) Javier Barranco Cosano (Spain) Benjamín Winter López	6–7^{(3–7)}, 0–6
Win	2–14	May 2023	M15 Antalya, Turkey	WTT	Clay	Anton Chekhov	Egor Agafonov (Bulgaria) Alexander Donski	4–6, 6–4, [10–8]
