= Alexander Zhurbin (tennis) =

Russian tennis player

Alexander Zhurbin Александр Журбин
- Full name: Alexander Gennadyevich Zhurbin
- Country (sports): Russia
- Born: 14 January 1992 (age 33)
- Plays: Right-handed (two handed-backhand)
- Prize money: $92,670

Singles
- Career record: 0–0 (at ATP Tour level, Grand Slam level, and in Davis Cup)
- Career titles: 1 ITF Futures
- Highest ranking: No. 331 (17 December 2018)

Doubles
- Career record: 0–2 (at ATP Tour level, Grand Slam level, and in Davis Cup)
- Career titles: 4 ITF Futures
- Highest ranking: No. 384 (29 July 2019)

Alexander Gennadyevich Zhurbin (Russian: Александр Геннадьевич Журбин; born 14 January 1992) is a Russian tennis player.

== Tennis career ==
Zhurbin has a career high ATP singles ranking of No. 331 achieved on 17 December 2018 and a career high ATP doubles ranking of No. 384 achieved on 29 July 2019. Zhurbin has won 1 ITF Futures singles title and 4 ITF Futures doubles titles.

Zhurbin made his ATP main draw debut at the 2010 St. Petersburg Open.
