= 2018 ITF Women's Circuit =

Details
- Duration: 1 January – 23 December 2018
- Edition: 25th
- Tournaments: 530
- Categories: $100,000 tournaments (14) $80,000 tournaments (12) $60,000 tournaments (40) $25,000 tournaments (166) $15,000 tournaments (298)

Achievements (singles)
- Most titles: (Chile) Fernanda Brito (9)
- Most finals: (Chile) Fernanda Brito (10)

The 2018 International Tennis Federation (ITF) Women's Circuit is a second-tier tour for women's professional tennis. It is organized by the International Tennis Federation and is a tier below the Women's Tennis Association (WTA) Tour. The ITF Women's Circuit includes tournaments with prize money ranging from $15,000 to $100,000.

== Retirement ==
- (Japan) Misa Eguchi
- (Poland) Justyna Jegiołka
- (Portugal) Maria João Koehler
- (New Zealand) Jade Lewis
- (Slovenia) Tadeja Majerič
- (Slovakia) Kristína Schmiedlová
- (Israel) Keren Shlomo

== Participating host nations ==
- Argentina (ARG)
- Australia (AUS)
- Austria (AUT)
- Bahrain (BHR)
- Belarus (BLR)
- Belgium (BEL)
- Bosnia and Herzegovina (BIH)
- Brazil (BRA)
- Bulgaria (BUL)
- Canada (CAN)
- Chile (CHI)
- China (CHN)
- Chinese Taipei (TPE)
- Colombia (COL)
- Croatia (CRO)
- Czech Republic (CZE)
- Djibouti (DJI)
- Ecuador (ECU)
- Egypt (EGY)
- El Salvador (ESA)
- Estonia (EST)
- Finland (FIN)
- France (FRA)
- Georgia (GEO)
- Germany (GER)
- Great Britain (GBR)
- Greece (GRE)
- Hong Kong (HKG)
- Hungary (HUN)
- India (IND)
- Indonesia (INA)
- Ireland (IRL)
- Israel (ISR)
- Italy (ITA)
- Japan (JPN)
- Kazakhstan (KAZ)
- Luxembourg (LUX)
- Mexico (MEX)
- Montenegro (MNE)
- Netherlands (NED)
- Nigeria (NGR)
- Norway (NOR)
- Paraguay (PAR)
- Poland (POL)
- Portugal (POR)
- Romania (ROU)
- Russia (RUS)
- Serbia (SRB)
- Singapore (SGP)
- Slovakia (SVK)
- Slovenia (SLO)
- South Africa (RSA)
- South Korea (KOR)
- Spain (ESP)
- Sweden (SWE)
- Switzerland (SUI)
- Thailand (THA)
- Trinidad and Tobago (TTO)
- Tunisia (TUN)
- Turkey (TUR)
- Ukraine (UKR)
- United Arab Emirates (UAE)
- United States (USA)
- Uzbekistan (UZB)

== Tournament breakdown by event category ==
| Event category | Number of events | Total prize money |
|---|---|---|
| $100,000 | 14 | $1,400,000 |
| $80,000 | 12 | $960,000 |
| $60,000 | 40 | $2,400,000 |
| $25,000 | 166 | $4,150,000 |
| $15,000 | 298 | $4,470,000 |
| Total | 530 | $13,380,000 |

== Ranking points distribution ==
| Category | W | F | SF | QF | R16 | R32 | Q | Q3 | Q2 | Q1 |
| ITF $100,000+H (S) | 150 | 90 | 55 | 28 | 14 | 1 | 6 | 4 | 1 | – |
| ITF $100,000+H (D) | 150 | 90 | 55 | 28 | 1 | – | – | – | – | – |
| ITF $100,000 (S) | 140 | 85 | 50 | 25 | 13 | 1 | 6 | 4 | 1 | – |
| ITF $100,000 (D) | 140 | 85 | 50 | 25 | 1 | – | – | – | – | – |
| ITF $80,000+H (S) | 130 | 80 | 48 | 24 | 12 | 1 | 5 | 3 | 1 | – |
| ITF $80,000+H (D) | 130 | 80 | 48 | 24 | 1 | – | – | – | – | – |
| ITF $80,000 (S) | 115 | 70 | 42 | 21 | 10 | 1 | 5 | 3 | 1 | – |
| ITF $80,000 (D) | 115 | 70 | 42 | 21 | 1 | – | – | – | – | – |
| ITF $60,000+H (S) | 100 | 60 | 36 | 18 | 9 | 1 | 5 | 3 | 1 | – |
| ITF $60,000+H (D) | 100 | 60 | 36 | 18 | 1 | – | – | – | – | – |
| ITF $60,000 (S) | 80 | 48 | 29 | 15 | 8 | 1 | 5 | 3 | 1 | – |
| ITF $60,000 (D) | 80 | 48 | 29 | 15 | 1 | – | – | – | – | – |
| ITF $25,000+H (S) | 60 | 36 | 22 | 11 | 6 | 1 | 2 | – | – | – |
| ITF $25,000+H (D) | 60 | 36 | 22 | 11 | 1 | – | – | – | – | – |
| ITF $25,000 (S) | 50 | 30 | 18 | 9 | 5 | 1 | 1 | – | – | – |
| ITF $25,000 (D) | 50 | 30 | 18 | 9 | 1 | – | – | – | – | – |
| ITF $15,000+H (S) | 25 | 15 | 9 | 5 | 1 | – | – | – | – | – |
| ITF $15,000+H (D) | 25 | 15 | 9 | 1 | 0 | – | – | – | – | – |
| ITF $15,000 (S) | 12 | 7 | 4 | 2 | 1 | – | – | – | – | – |
| ITF $15,000 (D) | 12 | 7 | 4 | 1 | 0 | – | – | – | – | – |

- "+H" indicates that hospitality is provided.

== Statistics ==
These tables present the number of singles (S) and doubles (D) titles won by each player and each nation during the season. The players/nations are sorted by:

1. Total number of titles (a doubles title won by two players representing the same nation counts as only one win for the nation)
2. A singles > doubles hierarchy
3. Alphabetical order (by family names for players).

To avoid confusion and double counting, these tables should be updated only after an event is completed.

=== Key ===
Category
$100,000 tournaments
$80,000 tournaments
$60,000 tournaments
$25,000 tournaments
$15,000 tournaments

=== Titles won by player ===
Updated as of December 24

| Total | Player | $100K | | $80K | | $60K | | $25K | | $15K | | Total | |
| Total | Player | S | D | S | D | S | D | S | D | S | D | S | D |
|---|---|---|---|---|---|---|---|---|---|---|---|---|---|
| 17 | Fernanda Brito (CHI) | | | | | | | | | 9 | 8 | 9 | 8 |
| 10 | Asia Muhammad (USA) | | 1 | | 2 | 2 | 4 | 1 | | | | 3 | 7 |
| 10 | Erin Routliffe (NZL) | | | | 2 | | | | 5 | 1 | 2 | 1 | 9 |
| 8 | Andreea Roșca (ROU) | | | | | | | 1 | | 4 | 3 | 5 | 3 |
| 8 | Lara Salden (BEL) | | | | | | | | | 4 | 4 | 4 | 4 |
| 8 | Raluca Șerban (CYP) | | | | | | | 2 | 2 | 1 | 3 | 3 | 5 |
| 7 | Ilona Georgiana Ghioroaie (ROU) | | | | | | | | | 6 | 1 | 6 | 1 |
| 7 | Lee Hua-chen (TPE) | | | | | | | | | 5 | 2 | 5 | 2 |
| 7 | Angelica Moratelli (ITA) | | | | | | | | 1 | 4 | 2 | 4 | 3 |
| 7 | Maya Tahan (ISR) | | | | | | | | | 2 | 5 | 2 | 5 |
| 7 | Anna Morgina (RUS) | | | | | | | | | 1 | 6 | 1 | 6 |
| 7 | Ellen Perez (AUS) | | 1 | | | | 4 | | 2 | | | 0 | 7 |
| 6 | Sandra Samir (EGY) | | | | | | | | 1 | 4 | 1 | 4 | 2 |
| 6 | Georgia Crăciun (ROU) | | | | | | | | | 4 | 2 | 4 | 2 |
| 6 | Anastasiya Shoshyna (UKR) | | | | | | | | | 4 | 2 | 4 | 2 |
| 6 | Ekaterine Gorgodze (GEO) | | | 1 | | 1 | | 1 | 2 | | 1 | 3 | 3 |
| 6 | Julia Terziyska (BUL) | | | | | | | | 2 | 3 | 1 | 3 | 3 |
| 6 | Nudnida Luangnam (THA) | | | | | | | | | 3 | 3 | 3 | 3 |
| 6 | Misaki Doi (JPN) | 1 | 1 | | | | 1 | 1 | 2 | | | 2 | 4 |
| 6 | Valentina Ivakhnenko (RUS) | | 1 | | 1 | | | 2 | 2 | | | 2 | 4 |
| 6 | Anastasia Zarycká (CZE) | | | | | | | 2 | 4 | | | 2 | 4 |
| 6 | Anna Bondár (HUN) | | | | | | | 1 | 2 | 1 | 2 | 2 | 4 |
| 6 | Emily Appleton (GBR) | | | | | | | | | 2 | 4 | 2 | 4 |
| 6 | Ioana Loredana Roșca (ROU) | | | | | | | | | 2 | 4 | 2 | 4 |
| 6 | Giorgia Marchetti (ITA) | | | | | | | | 4 | 1 | 1 | 1 | 5 |
| 6 | Maria Marfutina (RUS) | | | | | | | | 1 | 1 | 4 | 1 | 5 |
| 6 | Anastasia Pribylova (RUS) | | | | | | | | 1 | 1 | 4 | 1 | 5 |
| 6 | Nikola Tomanová (CZE) | | | | | | | | | 1 | 5 | 1 | 5 |
| 6 | Jessica Moore (AUS) | | 2 | | | | | | 4 | | | 0 | 6 |
| 6 | Laura Pigossi (BRA) | | | | | | 1 | | 3 | | 2 | 0 | 6 |
| 6 | Ilona Kremen (BLR) | | | | | | | | 3 | | 3 | 0 | 6 |
| 6 | Kim Na-ri (KOR) | | | | | | | | 5 | | 1 | 0 | 6 |
| 5 | Rebecca Marino (CAN) | | | | | | | 2 | | 3 | | 5 | 0 |
| 5 | Yuliya Hatouka (BLR) | | | | | | | 2 | | 2 | 1 | 4 | 1 |
| 5 | Viktória Kužmová (SVK) | 2 | | | | 1 | 2 | | | | | 3 | 2 |
| 5 | Ayano Shimizu (JPN) | | | | | 1 | | 2 | 2 | | | 3 | 2 |
| 5 | Marina Bassols Ribera (ESP) | | | | | | | | 1 | 3 | 1 | 3 | 2 |
| 5 | Harriet Dart (GBR) | | | | | | 2 | 2 | 1 | | | 2 | 3 |
| 5 | Han Xinyun (CHN) | | | | | | 1 | 2 | 1 | | 1 | 2 | 3 |
| 5 | Wang Xiyu (CHN) | | | | | | | 2 | 3 | | | 2 | 3 |
| 5 | Katarzyna Kawa (POL) | | | | | | | 1 | 1 | 1 | 2 | 2 | 3 |
| 5 | Gabriela Talabă (ROU) | | | | | | | 1 | 1 | 1 | 2 | 2 | 3 |
| 5 | Montserrat González (PAR) | | | | | | | | 2 | 2 | 1 | 2 | 3 |
| 5 | Hélène Scholsen (BEL) | | | | | | | | 2 | 2 | 1 | 2 | 3 |
| 5 | Andrea Lázaro García (ESP) | | | | | | | | | 2 | 3 | 2 | 3 |
| 5 | Caty McNally (USA) | | | | 1 | | | 1 | | | 3 | 1 | 4 |
| 5 | Arina Rodionova (AUS) | | | | | | 4 | 1 | | | | 1 | 4 |
| 5 | Andreea Mitu (ROU) | | | | | | 1 | | 1 | 1 | 2 | 1 | 4 |
| 5 | Martina Colmegna (ITA) | | | | | | | | 3 | 1 | 1 | 1 | 4 |
| 5 | Lee So-ra (KOR) | | | | | | | | 2 | 1 | 2 | 1 | 4 |
| 5 | Eleni Kordolaimi (GRE) | | | | | | | | 1 | 1 | 3 | 1 | 4 |
| 5 | Oana Georgeta Simion (ROU) | | | | | | | | 1 | 1 | 3 | 1 | 4 |
| 5 | Daria Kruzhkova (RUS) | | | | | | | | | 1 | 4 | 1 | 4 |
| 5 | Alexa Guarachi (CHI) | | | | 2 | | | | 3 | | | 0 | 5 |
| 5 | Ena Shibahara (USA) | | | | | | 2 | | 3 | | | 0 | 5 |
| 5 | Cristina Dinu (ROU) | | | | | | 1 | | 4 | | | 0 | 5 |
| 5 | Elixane Lechemia (FRA) | | | | | | | | 4 | | 1 | 0 | 5 |
| 5 | Olivia Nicholls (GBR) | | | | | | | | 3 | | 2 | 0 | 5 |
| 5 | Sofia Shapatava (GEO) | | | | | | | | 3 | | 2 | 0 | 5 |
| 5 | Olga Parres Azcoitia (ESP) | | | | | | | | 1 | | 4 | 0 | 5 |
| 5 | Wang Danni (CHN) | | | | | | | | 1 | | 4 | 0 | 5 |
| 5 | Camila Giangreco Campiz (PAR) | | | | | | | | | | 5 | 0 | 5 |
| 4 | Fiona Ferro (FRA) | | | 1 | | | | 3 | | | | 4 | 0 |
| 4 | Iga Świątek (POL) | | | | | 2 | | 1 | | 1 | | 4 | 0 |
| 4 | Kaja Juvan (SLO) | | | | | | | 4 | | | | 4 | 0 |
| 4 | Mandy Minella (LUX) | | | | | | | 4 | | | | 4 | 0 |
| 4 | Tamara Zidanšek (SLO) | | | | | | | 4 | | | | 4 | 0 |
| 4 | Varvara Flink (RUS) | | | | | | | 1 | | 3 | | 4 | 0 |
| 4 | Ylena In-Albon (SUI) | | | | | | | 1 | | 3 | | 4 | 0 |
| 4 | Nastja Kolar (SLO) | | | | | | | | | 4 | | 4 | 0 |
| 4 | Greet Minnen (BEL) | | | | | | | | | 4 | | 4 | 0 |
| 4 | Gabriela Pantůčková (CZE) | | | | | | | | | 4 | | 4 | 0 |
| 4 | Zoe Hives (AUS) | | | | | 1 | | 2 | 1 | | | 3 | 1 |
| 4 | Astra Sharma (AUS) | | | | | | | 3 | 1 | | | 3 | 1 |
| 4 | Gabriella Taylor (GBR) | | | | | | | 3 | 1 | | | 3 | 1 |
| 4 | Leonie Küng (SUI) | | | | | | | | 1 | 3 | | 3 | 1 |
| 4 | Claudia Giovine (ITA) | | | | | | | | | 3 | 1 | 3 | 1 |
| 4 | Elizabeth Halbauer (USA) | | | | | | | | | 3 | 1 | 3 | 1 |
| 4 | Daria Mishina (RUS) | | | | | | | | | 3 | 1 | 3 | 1 |
| 4 | Luksika Kumkhum (THA) | | 1 | | | | | 2 | 1 | | | 2 | 2 |
| 4 | Xu Shilin (CHN) | | | | | 1 | | 1 | 1 | | 1 | 2 | 2 |
| 4 | Ankita Raina (IND) | | | | | | 1 | 2 | 1 | | | 2 | 2 |
| 4 | Momoko Kobori (JPN) | | | | | | | 2 | 2 | | | 2 | 2 |
| 4 | Pranjala Yadlapalli (IND) | | | | | | | 2 | 2 | | | 2 | 2 |
| 4 | Nefisa Berberović (BIH) | | | | | | | | | 2 | 2 | 2 | 2 |
| 4 | Dia Evtimova (BUL) | | | | | | | | | 2 | 2 | 2 | 2 |
| 4 | Catalina Pella (ARG) | | | | | | | | | 2 | 2 | 2 | 2 |
| 4 | Nina Stojanović (SRB) | | | | 1 | 1 | 1 | | 1 | | | 1 | 3 |
| 4 | Cristina Bucșa (ESP) | | | | | | 1 | 1 | 1 | | 1 | 1 | 3 |
| 4 | Despina Papamichail (GRE) | | | | | | 1 | | 2 | 1 | | 1 | 3 |
| 4 | Réka Luca Jani (HUN) | | | | | | 1 | | 1 | 1 | 1 | 1 | 3 |
| 4 | Tara Moore (GBR) | | | | | | 1 | | 1 | 1 | 1 | 1 | 3 |
| 4 | Victoria Rodríguez (MEX) | | | | | | | 1 | 3 | | | 1 | 3 |
| 4 | Natalija Kostić (SRB) | | | | | | | 1 | 2 | | 1 | 1 | 3 |
| 4 | Tereza Mihalíková (SVK) | | | | | | | | 3 | 1 | | 1 | 3 |
| 4 | Amina Anshba (RUS) | | | | | | | | 2 | 1 | 1 | 1 | 3 |
| 4 | Iryna Shymanovich (BLR) | | | | | | | | 2 | 1 | 1 | 1 | 3 |
| 4 | Maryna Chernyshova (UKR) | | | | | | | | 1 | 1 | 2 | 1 | 3 |
| 4 | Anastasia Grymalska (ITA) | | | | | | | | 1 | 1 | 2 | 1 | 3 |
| 4 | Aldila Sutjiadi (INA) | | | | | | | | 1 | 1 | 2 | 1 | 3 |
| 4 | Barbara Bonić (SRB) | | | | | | | | | 1 | 3 | 1 | 3 |
| 4 | Claudia Hoste Ferrer (ESP) | | | | | | | | | 1 | 3 | 1 | 3 |
| 4 | Natalia Siedliska (GER) | | | | | | | | | 1 | 3 | 1 | 3 |
| 4 | Bunyawi Thamchaiwat (THA) | | | | | | | | | 1 | 3 | 1 | 3 |
| 4 | Maria Sanchez (USA) | | 1 | | 1 | | 2 | | | | | 0 | 4 |
| 4 | Chantal Škamlová (SVK) | | 1 | | | | 1 | | 2 | | | 0 | 4 |
| 4 | Alena Fomina (RUS) | | 1 | | | | | | | | 3 | 0 | 4 |
| 4 | Ye Qiuyu (CHN) | | | | | | 2 | | 1 | | 1 | 0 | 4 |
| 4 | Naiktha Bains (AUS) | | | | | | 1 | | 3 | | | 0 | 4 |
| 4 | Ulrikke Eikeri (NOR) | | | | | | 1 | | 3 | | | 0 | 4 |
| 4 | Bibiane Schoofs (NED) | | | | | | 1 | | 3 | | | 0 | 4 |
| 4 | Aymet Uzcátegui (VEN) | | | | | | 1 | | 2 | | 1 | 0 | 4 |
| 4 | Federica Di Sarra (ITA) | | | | | | | | 4 | | | 0 | 4 |
| 4 | Akiko Omae (JPN) | | | | | | | | 4 | | | 0 | 4 |
| 4 | Valeriya Solovyeva (RUS) | | | | | | | | 2 | | 2 | 0 | 4 |
| 4 | Emilie Francati (DEN) | | | | | | | | 1 | | 3 | 0 | 4 |
| 4 | Chiara Scholl (USA) | | | | | | | | 1 | | 3 | 0 | 4 |
| 4 | Haruna Arakawa (JPN) | | | | | | | | | | 4 | 0 | 4 |
| 4 | Tamara Čurović (SRB) | | | | | | | | | | 4 | 0 | 4 |
| 4 | Veronika Erjavec (SLO) | | | | | | | | | | 4 | 0 | 4 |
| 4 | Oana Gavrilă (ROU) | | | | | | | | | | 4 | 0 | 4 |
| 4 | Madeleine Kobelt (USA) | | | | | | | | | | 4 | 0 | 4 |
| 4 | Jelena Stojanovic (AUS) | | | | | | | | | | 4 | 0 | 4 |
| 4 | Miriana Tona (ITA) | | | | | | | | | | 4 | 0 | 4 |
| 4 | Eva Vedder (NED) | | | | | | | | | | 4 | 0 | 4 |
| 4 | Aurora Zantedeschi (ITA) | | | | | | | | | | 4 | 0 | 4 |
| 3 | Madison Brengle (USA) | 1 | | | | 2 | | | | | | 3 | 0 |
| 3 | Tereza Smitková (CZE) | 1 | | | | | | 2 | | | | 3 | 0 |
| 3 | Taylor Townsend (USA) | | | 2 | | | | 1 | | | | 3 | 0 |
| 3 | Paula Badosa Gibert (ESP) | | | | | 1 | | 2 | | | | 3 | 0 |
| 3 | Julia Glushko (ISR) | | | | | 1 | | 2 | | | | 3 | 0 |
| 3 | Sabina Sharipova (UZB) | | | | | 1 | | 2 | | | | 3 | 0 |
| 3 | Başak Eraydın (TUR) | | | | | | | 3 | | | | 3 | 0 |
| 3 | Anhelina Kalinina (UKR) | | | | | | | 3 | | | | 3 | 0 |
| 3 | Dejana Radanović (SRB) | | | | | | | 3 | | | | 3 | 0 |
| 3 | Lee Ya-hsuan (TPE) | | | | | | | 2 | | 1 | | 3 | 0 |
| 3 | Marta Leśniak (POL) | | | | | | | | | 3 | | 3 | 0 |
| 3 | Ekaterina Makarova (RUS) | | | | | | | | | 3 | | 3 | 0 |
| 3 | Irina Ramialison (FRA) | | | | | | | | | 3 | | 3 | 0 |
| 3 | Bianca Turati (ITA) | | | | | | | | | 3 | | 3 | 0 |
| 3 | Zheng Saisai (CHN) | 1 | 1 | | | 1 | | | | | | 2 | 1 |
| 3 | Olga Doroshina (RUS) | | 1 | | | | | 1 | | 1 | | 2 | 1 |
| 3 | Jesika Malečková (CZE) | | | | 1 | | | 1 | | 1 | | 2 | 1 |
| 3 | Gail Brodsky (USA) | | | | | 1 | | | | 1 | 1 | 2 | 1 |
| 3 | Lesley Kerkhove (NED) | | | | | | 1 | 2 | | | | 2 | 1 |
| 3 | Bianca Andreescu (CAN) | | | | | | | 2 | 1 | | | 2 | 1 |
| 3 | Aliona Bolsova Zadoinov (ESP) | | | | | | | 2 | 1 | | | 2 | 1 |
| 3 | Xun Fangying (CHN) | | | | | | | | 1 | 2 | | 2 | 1 |
| 3 | Lea Bošković (CRO) | | | | | | | | | 2 | 1 | 2 | 1 |
| 3 | Jacqueline Cabaj Awad (SWE) | | | | | | | | | 2 | 1 | 2 | 1 |
| 3 | Elena-Teodora Cadar (ROU) | | | | | | | | | 2 | 1 | 2 | 1 |
| 3 | Ioana Gaspar (ROU) | | | | | | | | | 2 | 1 | 2 | 1 |
| 3 | Malene Helgø (NOR) | | | | | | | | | 2 | 1 | 2 | 1 |
| 3 | Noa Liauw a Fong (NED) | | | | | | | | | 2 | 1 | 2 | 1 |
| 3 | Wu Ho-ching (HKG) | | | | | | | | | 2 | 1 | 2 | 1 |
| 3 | Whitney Osuigwe (USA) | | | 1 | | | | | 1 | | 1 | 1 | 2 |
| 3 | Anna Blinkova (RUS) | | | | 1 | 1 | 1 | | | | | 1 | 2 |
| 3 | Nicole Gibbs (USA) | | | | 1 | | 1 | 1 | | | | 1 | 2 |
| 3 | Sophie Chang (USA) | | | | 1 | | | | 1 | 1 | | 1 | 2 |
| 3 | Dalila Jakupović (SLO) | | | | | 1 | 1 | | 1 | | | 1 | 2 |
| 3 | Irina Khromacheva (RUS) | | | | | | 1 | 1 | 1 | | | 1 | 2 |
| 3 | Nadia Podoroska (ARG) | | | | | | 1 | 1 | 1 | | | 1 | 2 |
| 3 | Wang Xinyu (CHN) | | | | | | 1 | 1 | 1 | | | 1 | 2 |
| 3 | Han Na-lae (KOR) | | | | | | | 1 | 2 | | | 1 | 2 |
| 3 | Paula Ormaechea (ARG) | | | | | | | 1 | 2 | | | 1 | 2 |
| 3 | Valeria Savinykh (RUS) | | | | | | | 1 | 2 | | | 1 | 2 |
| 3 | Marie Benoît (BEL) | | | | | | | 1 | 1 | | 1 | 1 | 2 |
| 3 | Katharina Gerlach (GER) | | | | | | | 1 | 1 | | 1 | 1 | 2 |
| 3 | Vladica Babić (MNE) | | | | | | | | 2 | 1 | | 1 | 2 |
| 3 | Irina Fetecău (ROU) | | | | | | | | 2 | 1 | | 1 | 2 |
| 3 | Michaëlla Krajicek (NED) | | | | | | | | 2 | 1 | | 1 | 2 |
| 3 | Isabella Shinikova (BUL) | | | | | | | | 2 | 1 | | 1 | 2 |
| 3 | Mathilde Armitano (FRA) | | | | | | | | 1 | 1 | 1 | 1 | 2 |
| 3 | Michaela Bayerlová (CZE) | | | | | | | | | 1 | 2 | 1 | 2 |
| 3 | Alba Carrillo Marín (ESP) | | | | | | | | | 1 | 2 | 1 | 2 |
| 3 | Cristina Ene (ROU) | | | | | | | | | 1 | 2 | 1 | 2 |
| 3 | Arianne Hartono (NED) | | | | | | | | | 1 | 2 | 1 | 2 |
| 3 | Vlada Koval (RUS) | | | | | | | | | 1 | 2 | 1 | 2 |
| 3 | Oona Orpana (FIN) | | | | | | | | | 1 | 2 | 1 | 2 |
| 3 | Ksenia Palkina (KGZ) | | | | | | | | | 1 | 2 | 1 | 2 |
| 3 | Magdaléna Pantůčková (CZE) | | | | | | | | | 1 | 2 | 1 | 2 |
| 3 | Naho Sato (JPN) | | | | | | | | | 1 | 2 | 1 | 2 |
| 3 | Julyette Steur (GER) | | | | | | | | | 1 | 2 | 1 | 2 |
| 3 | Anastasia Sukhotina (RUS) | | | | | | | | | 1 | 2 | 1 | 2 |
| 3 | Marina Yudanov (SWE) | | | | | | | | | 1 | 2 | 1 | 2 |
| 3 | Michele Alexandra Zmău (ITA) | | | | | | | | | 1 | 2 | 1 | 2 |
| 3 | Kaitlyn Christian (USA) | | 2 | | | | | | 1 | | | 0 | 3 |
| 3 | Sabrina Santamaria (USA) | | 2 | | | | | | 1 | | | 0 | 3 |
| 3 | Anna Danilina (KAZ) | | | | 1 | | | | 2 | | | 0 | 3 |
| 3 | Cornelia Lister (SWE) | | | | 1 | | | | 1 | | 1 | 0 | 3 |
| 3 | Naomi Broady (GBR) | | | | | | 2 | | 1 | | | 0 | 3 |
| 3 | Hayley Carter (USA) | | | | | | 2 | | 1 | | | 0 | 3 |
| 3 | Rutuja Bhosale (IND) | | | | | | 1 | | 2 | | | 0 | 3 |
| 3 | Andrea Gámiz (VEN) | | | | | | 1 | | 2 | | | 0 | 3 |
| 3 | Conny Perrin (SUI) | | | | | | 1 | | 2 | | | 0 | 3 |
| 3 | Quinn Gleason (USA) | | | | | | 1 | | | | 2 | 0 | 3 |
| 3 | Freya Christie (GBR) | | | | | | | | 3 | | | 0 | 3 |
| 3 | Sarah Beth Grey (GBR) | | | | | | | | 3 | | | 0 | 3 |
| 3 | Katarzyna Piter (POL) | | | | | | | | 3 | | | 0 | 3 |
| 3 | Yana Sizikova (RUS) | | | | | | | | 3 | | | 0 | 3 |
| 3 | Eva Wacanno (NED) | | | | | | | | 3 | | | 0 | 3 |
| 3 | Ekaterina Yashina (RUS) | | | | | | | | 3 | | | 0 | 3 |
| 3 | Chen Pei-hsuan (TPE) | | | | | | | | 2 | | 1 | 0 | 3 |
| 3 | Feng Shuo (CHN) | | | | | | | | 2 | | 1 | 0 | 3 |
| 3 | Ángela Fita Boluda (ESP) | | | | | | | | 2 | | 1 | 0 | 3 |
| 3 | Anastasia Frolova (RUS) | | | | | | | | 2 | | 1 | 0 | 3 |
| 3 | Rosalie van der Hoek (NED) | | | | | | | | 2 | | 1 | 0 | 3 |
| 3 | Hsu Chieh-yu (TPE) | | | | | | | | 2 | | 1 | 0 | 3 |
| 3 | Lee Pei-chi (TPE) | | | | | | | | 2 | | 1 | 0 | 3 |
| 3 | Samantha Murray (GBR) | | | | | | | | 2 | | 1 | 0 | 3 |
| 3 | Wu Fang-hsien (TPE) | | | | | | | | 2 | | 1 | 0 | 3 |
| 3 | Erina Hayashi (JPN) | | | | | | | | 1 | | 2 | 0 | 3 |
| 3 | Daria Kuczer (POL) | | | | | | | | 1 | | 2 | 0 | 3 |
| 3 | Alice Ramé (FRA) | | | | | | | | 1 | | 2 | 0 | 3 |
| 3 | Bárbara Gatica (CHI) | | | | | | | | | | 3 | 0 | 3 |
| 3 | Katharina Hering (GER) | | | | | | | | | | 3 | 0 | 3 |
| 3 | Karolína Kubáňová (CZE) | | | | | | | | | | 3 | 0 | 3 |
| 3 | Sofía Luini (ARG) | | | | | | | | | | 3 | 0 | 3 |
| 3 | Rebeca Pereira (BRA) | | | | | | | | | | 3 | 0 | 3 |
| 3 | Anna Pribylova (RUS) | | | | | | | | | | 3 | 0 | 3 |
| 3 | Melis Sezer (TUR) | | | | | | | | | | 3 | 0 | 3 |
| 3 | Camille Sireix (FRA) | | | | | | | | | | 3 | 0 | 3 |
| 3 | Amy Zhu (USA) | | | | | | | | | | 3 | 0 | 3 |
| 2 | Vera Lapko (BLR) | 1 | | | | 1 | | | | | | 2 | 0 |
| 2 | Ivana Jorović (SRB) | 1 | | | | | | 1 | | | | 2 | 0 |
| 2 | Mariana Duque Mariño (COL) | | | 1 | | 1 | | | | | | 2 | 0 |
| 2 | Richèl Hogenkamp (NED) | | | 1 | | | | 1 | | | | 2 | 0 |
| 2 | Zhu Lin (CHN) | | | | | 2 | | | | | | 2 | 0 |
| 2 | Katie Boulter (GBR) | | | | | 1 | | 1 | | | | 2 | 0 |
| 2 | Olga Danilović (SRB) | | | | | 1 | | 1 | | | | 2 | 0 |
| 2 | Tereza Mrdeža (CRO) | | | | | 1 | | 1 | | | | 2 | 0 |
| 2 | Liudmila Samsonova (RUS) | | | | | 1 | | 1 | | | | 2 | 0 |
| 2 | Kathinka von Deichmann (LIE) | | | | | | | 2 | | | | 2 | 0 |
| 2 | Martina Di Giuseppe (ITA) | | | | | | | 2 | | | | 2 | 0 |
| 2 | Jaimee Fourlis (AUS) | | | | | | | 2 | | | | 2 | 0 |
| 2 | Barbara Haas (AUT) | | | | | | | 2 | | | | 2 | 0 |
| 2 | Zhang Yuxuan (CHN) | | | | | | | 2 | | | | 2 | 0 |
| 2 | Monika Kilnarová (CZE) | | | | | | | 1 | | 1 | | 2 | 0 |
| 2 | Stefania Rubini (ITA) | | | | | | | 1 | | 1 | | 2 | 0 |
| 2 | Harmony Tan (FRA) | | | | | | | 1 | | 1 | | 2 | 0 |
| 2 | Pia Čuk (SLO) | | | | | | | | | 2 | | 2 | 0 |
| 2 | Anastasia Dețiuc (CZE) | | | | | | | | | 2 | | 2 | 0 |
| 2 | Francesca Jones (GBR) | | | | | | | | | 2 | | 2 | 0 |
| 2 | Francisca Jorge (POR) | | | | | | | | | 2 | | 2 | 0 |
| 2 | Anastasia Kulikova (FIN) | | | | | | | | | 2 | | 2 | 0 |
| 2 | Daria Lopatetska (UKR) | | | | | | | | | 2 | | 2 | 0 |
| 2 | Eléonora Molinaro (LUX) | | | | | | | | | 2 | | 2 | 0 |
| 2 | Emma Raducanu (GBR) | | | | | | | | | 2 | | 2 | 0 |
| 2 | Rebecca Šramková (SVK) | | | | | | | | | 2 | | 2 | 0 |
| 2 | Simona Waltert (SUI) | | | | | | | | | 2 | | 2 | 0 |
| 2 | Margot Yerolymos (FRA) | | | | | | | | | 2 | | 2 | 0 |
| 2 | Kirsten Flipkens (BEL) | 1 | 1 | | | | | | | | | 1 | 1 |
| 2 | Nao Hibino (JPN) | | 1 | | | 1 | | | | | | 1 | 1 |
| 2 | Anastasiya Komardina (RUS) | | 1 | | | | | | | 1 | | 1 | 1 |
| 2 | Berfu Cengiz (TUR) | | | | 1 | | | | | 1 | | 1 | 1 |
| 2 | Alexandra Panova (RUS) | | | | 1 | | | | | 1 | | 1 | 1 |
| 2 | Priscilla Hon (AUS) | | | | | 1 | 1 | | | | | 1 | 1 |
| 2 | Quirine Lemoine (NED) | | | | | 1 | | | 1 | | | 1 | 1 |
| 2 | Francesca Di Lorenzo (USA) | | | | | | 1 | 1 | | | | 1 | 1 |
| 2 | Hiroko Kuwata (JPN) | | | | | | 1 | 1 | | | | 1 | 1 |
| 2 | Pemra Özgen (TUR) | | | | | | 1 | 1 | | | | 1 | 1 |
| 2 | Ayla Aksu (TUR) | | | | | | 1 | | | 1 | | 1 | 1 |
| 2 | Eudice Chong (HKG) | | | | | | 1 | | | 1 | | 1 | 1 |
| 2 | María Fernanda Herazo (COL) | | | | | | 1 | | | 1 | | 1 | 1 |
| 2 | Aleksandrina Naydenova (BUL) | | | | | | 1 | | | 1 | | 1 | 1 |
| 2 | Nigina Abduraimova (UZB) | | | | | | | 1 | 1 | | | 1 | 1 |
| 2 | Manon Arcangioli (FRA) | | | | | | | 1 | 1 | | | 1 | 1 |
| 2 | Estrella Cabeza Candela (ESP) | | | | | | | 1 | 1 | | | 1 | 1 |
| 2 | Anastasia Gasanova (RUS) | | | | | | | 1 | 1 | | | 1 | 1 |
| 2 | Giulia Gatto-Monticone (ITA) | | | | | | | 1 | 1 | | | 1 | 1 |
| 2 | Miriam Kolodziejová (CZE) | | | | | | | 1 | 1 | | | 1 | 1 |
| 2 | Lu Jiajing (CHN) | | | | | | | 1 | 1 | | | 1 | 1 |
| 2 | Diāna Marcinkēviča (LAT) | | | | | | | 1 | 1 | | | 1 | 1 |
| 2 | Valeriya Strakhova (UKR) | | | | | | | 1 | 1 | | | 1 | 1 |
| 2 | Karman Thandi (IND) | | | | | | | 1 | 1 | | | 1 | 1 |
| 2 | Yanina Wickmayer (BEL) | | | | | | | 1 | 1 | | | 1 | 1 |
| 2 | Anna Zaja (GER) | | | | | | | 1 | 1 | | | 1 | 1 |
| 2 | Miriam Bulgaru (ROU) | | | | | | | | 1 | 1 | | 1 | 1 |
| 2 | Gao Xinyu (CHN) | | | | | | | | 1 | 1 | | 1 | 1 |
| 2 | Alice Matteucci (ITA) | | | | | | | | 1 | 1 | | 1 | 1 |
| 2 | Seone Mendez (AUS) | | | | | | | | 1 | 1 | | 1 | 1 |
| 2 | Lou Adler (FRA) | | | | | | | | | 1 | 1 | 1 | 1 |
| 2 | Laura-Ioana Andrei (ROU) | | | | | | | | | 1 | 1 | 1 | 1 |
| 2 | Federica Bilardo (ITA) | | | | | | | | | 1 | 1 | 1 | 1 |
| 2 | Viktoriia Dema (UKR) | | | | | | | | | 1 | 1 | 1 | 1 |
| 2 | Katharine Fahey (USA) | | | | | | | | | 1 | 1 | 1 | 1 |
| 2 | Fiona Ganz (SUI) | | | | | | | | | 1 | 1 | 1 | 1 |
| 2 | Gabriela Horáčková (CZE) | | | | | | | | | 1 | 1 | 1 | 1 |
| 2 | Dasha Ivanova (USA) | | | | | | | | | 1 | 1 | 1 | 1 |
| 2 | Victoria Kan (RUS) | | | | | | | | | 1 | 1 | 1 | 1 |
| 2 | Kim Da-bin (KOR) | | | | | | | | | 1 | 1 | 1 | 1 |
| 2 | Xenia Knoll (SUI) | | | | | | | | | 1 | 1 | 1 | 1 |
| 2 | María José Luque Moreno (ESP) | | | | | | | | | 1 | 1 | 1 | 1 |
| 2 | Thaisa Grana Pedretti (BRA) | | | | | | | | | 1 | 1 | 1 | 1 |
| 2 | Manca Pislak (SLO) | | | | | | | | | 1 | 1 | 1 | 1 |
| 2 | María José Portillo Ramírez (MEX) | | | | | | | | | 1 | 1 | 1 | 1 |
| 2 | Angelica Raggi (ITA) | | | | | | | | | 1 | 1 | 1 | 1 |
| 2 | Charlotte Römer (ECU) | | | | | | | | | 1 | 1 | 1 | 1 |
| 2 | Elena Rybakina (KAZ) | | | | | | | | | 1 | 1 | 1 | 1 |
| 2 | Anastasiya Rychagova (RUS) | | | | | | | | | 1 | 1 | 1 | 1 |
| 2 | Gergana Topalova (BUL) | | | | | | | | | 1 | 1 | 1 | 1 |
| 2 | Anna Ureke (RUS) | | | | | | | | | 1 | 1 | 1 | 1 |
| 2 | Daniela Vismane (LAT) | | | | | | | | | 1 | 1 | 1 | 1 |
| 2 | Allura Zamarripa (USA) | | | | | | | | | 1 | 1 | 1 | 1 |
| 2 | Giuliana Olmos (MEX) | | 1 | | | | | | 1 | | | 0 | 2 |
| 2 | Irina Bara (ROU) | | | | 1 | | 1 | | | | | 0 | 2 |
| 2 | Jessica Pegula (USA) | | | | 1 | | 1 | | | | | 0 | 2 |
| 2 | Alexandra Mueller (USA) | | | | 1 | | | | 1 | | | 0 | 2 |
| 2 | Anna Kalinskaya (RUS) | | | | | | 2 | | | | | 0 | 2 |
| 2 | Renata Zarazúa (MEX) | | | | | | 2 | | | | | 0 | 2 |
| 2 | Ysaline Bonaventure (BEL) | | | | | | 1 | | 1 | | | 0 | 2 |
| 2 | Polina Monova (RUS) | | | | | | 1 | | 1 | | | 0 | 2 |
| 2 | Ganna Poznikhirenko (UKR) | | | | | | 1 | | 1 | | | 0 | 2 |
| 2 | Laura Robson (GBR) | | | | | | 1 | | 1 | | | 0 | 2 |
| 2 | Luisa Stefani (BRA) | | | | | | 1 | | 1 | | | 0 | 2 |
| 2 | You Xiaodi (CHN) | | | | | | 1 | | 1 | | | 0 | 2 |
| 2 | Yvonne Cavallé Reimers (ESP) | | | | | | | | 2 | | | 0 | 2 |
| 2 | Choi Ji-hee (KOR) | | | | | | | | 2 | | | 0 | 2 |
| 2 | Maja Chwalińska (POL) | | | | | | | | 2 | | | 0 | 2 |
| 2 | Valentini Grammatikopoulou (GRE) | | | | | | | | 2 | | | 0 | 2 |
| 2 | Hsu Ching-wen (TPE) | | | | | | | | 2 | | | 0 | 2 |
| 2 | Jiang Xinyu (CHN) | | | | | | | | 2 | | | 0 | 2 |
| 2 | Kang Jiaqi (CHN) | | | | | | | | 2 | | | 0 | 2 |
| 2 | Albina Khabibulina (UZB) | | | | | | | | 2 | | | 0 | 2 |
| 2 | Kaylah McPhee (AUS) | | | | | | | | 2 | | | 0 | 2 |
| 2 | Kanako Morisaki (JPN) | | | | | | | | 2 | | | 0 | 2 |
| 2 | Chanel Simmonds (RSA) | | | | | | | | 2 | | | 0 | 2 |
| 2 | Olivia Tjandramulia (AUS) | | | | | | | | 2 | | | 0 | 2 |
| 2 | Ana Veselinović (MNE) | | | | | | | | 2 | | | 0 | 2 |
| 2 | Julia Wachaczyk (GER) | | | | | | | | 2 | | | 0 | 2 |
| 2 | Marcela Zacarías (MEX) | | | | | | | | 2 | | | 0 | 2 |
| 2 | Estelle Cascino (FRA) | | | | | | | | 1 | | 1 | 0 | 2 |
| 2 | Ayaka Okuno (JPN) | | | | | | | | 1 | | 1 | 0 | 2 |
| 2 | Barbora Štefková (CZE) | | | | | | | | 1 | | 1 | 0 | 2 |
| 2 | Cristina Adamescu (ROU) | | | | | | | | | | 2 | 0 | 2 |
| 2 | Soumeya Anane (GBR) | | | | | | | | | | 2 | 0 | 2 |
| 2 | Paula Arias Manjón (ESP) | | | | | | | | | | 2 | 0 | 2 |
| 2 | Alicia Barnett (GBR) | | | | | | | | | | 2 | 0 | 2 |
| 2 | Karola Patricia Bejenaru (ROU) | | | | | | | | | | 2 | 0 | 2 |
| 2 | Kamonwan Buayam (THA) | | | | | | | | | | 2 | 0 | 2 |
| 2 | Ágnes Bukta (HUN) | | | | | | | | | | 2 | 0 | 2 |
| 2 | Irene Burillo Escorihuela (ESP) | | | | | | | | | | 2 | 0 | 2 |
| 2 | Cho I-hsuan (TPE) | | | | | | | | | | 2 | 0 | 2 |
| 2 | Vlada Ekshibarova (ISR) | | | | | | | | | | 2 | 0 | 2 |
| 2 | Weronika Falkowska (POL) | | | | | | | | | | 2 | 0 | 2 |
| 2 | Angelina Gabueva (RUS) | | | | | | | | | | 2 | 0 | 2 |
| 2 | Dea Herdželaš (BIH) | | | | | | | | | | 2 | 0 | 2 |
| 2 | Verena Hofer (ITA) | | | | | | | | | | 2 | 0 | 2 |
| 2 | Chisa Hosonuma (JPN) | | | | | | | | | | 2 | 0 | 2 |
| 2 | Kristýna Hrabalová (CZE) | | | | | | | | | | 2 | 0 | 2 |
| 2 | Anna Iakovleva (RUS) | | | | | | | | | | 2 | 0 | 2 |
| 2 | Jana Jablonovská (SVK) | | | | | | | | | | 2 | 0 | 2 |
| 2 | Petra Januskova (CAN) | | | | | | | | | | 2 | 0 | 2 |
| 2 | Maria Jespersen (DEN) | | | | | | | | | | 2 | 0 | 2 |
| 2 | Chompoothip Jundakate (THA) | | | | | | | | | | 2 | 0 | 2 |
| 2 | Lenka Juríková (SVK) | | | | | | | | | | 2 | 0 | 2 |
| 2 | Andrea Ka (CAM) | | | | | | | | | | 2 | 0 | 2 |
| 2 | Dominique Karregat (NED) | | | | | | | | | | 2 | 0 | 2 |
| 2 | Karin Kennel (SUI) | | | | | | | | | | 2 | 0 | 2 |
| 2 | Kim Mi-ok (KOR) | | | | | | | | | | 2 | 0 | 2 |
| 2 | Julia Kimmelmann (GER) | | | | | | | | | | 2 | 0 | 2 |
| 2 | Suzan Lamens (NED) | | | | | | | | | | 2 | 0 | 2 |
| 2 | Jade Lewis (NZL) | | | | | | | | | | 2 | 0 | 2 |
| 2 | Bojana Marinković (SRB) | | | | | | | | | | 2 | 0 | 2 |
| 2 | Johana Marková (CZE) | | | | | | | | | | 2 | 0 | 2 |
| 2 | Annick Melgers (NED) | | | | | | | | | | 2 | 0 | 2 |
| 2 | Inês Murta (POR) | | | | | | | | | | 2 | 0 | 2 |
| 2 | Daria Nazarkina (RUS) | | | | | | | | | | 2 | 0 | 2 |
| 2 | Elina Nepliy (RUS) | | | | | | | | | | 2 | 0 | 2 |
| 2 | Silvia Njirić (CRO) | | | | | | | | | | 2 | 0 | 2 |
| 2 | Kristina Novak (SLO) | | | | | | | | | | 2 | 0 | 2 |
| 2 | İpek Öz (TUR) | | | | | | | | | | 2 | 0 | 2 |
| 2 | Sviatlana Pirazhenka (BLR) | | | | | | | | | | 2 | 0 | 2 |
| 2 | Aleksandra Pitak (GBR) | | | | | | | | | | 2 | 0 | 2 |
| 2 | Katarzyna Pitak (GBR) | | | | | | | | | | 2 | 0 | 2 |
| 2 | Nika Radišič (SLO) | | | | | | | | | | 2 | 0 | 2 |
| 2 | Yukina Saigo (JPN) | | | | | | | | | | 2 | 0 | 2 |
| 2 | Nina Stadler (SUI) | | | | | | | | | | 2 | 0 | 2 |
| 2 | Costanza Traversi (ITA) | | | | | | | | | | 2 | 0 | 2 |
| 2 | Anna Ukolova (RUS) | | | | | | | | | | 2 | 0 | 2 |
| 2 | Emily Webley-Smith (GBR) | | | | | | | | | | 2 | 0 | 2 |
| 2 | Noelia Zeballos (BOL) | | | | | | | | | | 2 | 0 | 2 |
| 2 | Zheng Wushuang (CHN) | | | | | | | | | | 2 | 0 | 2 |
| 1 | Ons Jabeur (TUN) | 1 | | | | | | | | | | 1 | 0 |
| 1 | Peng Shuai (CHN) | 1 | | | | | | | | | | 1 | 0 |
| 1 | Rebecca Peterson (SWE) | 1 | | | | | | | | | | 1 | 0 |
| 1 | Alison Riske (USA) | 1 | | | | | | | | | | 1 | 0 |
| 1 | Stefanie Vögele (SUI) | 1 | | | | | | | | | | 1 | 0 |
| 1 | Belinda Bencic (SUI) | | | 1 | | | | | | | | 1 | 0 |
| 1 | Viktorija Golubic (SUI) | | | 1 | | | | | | | | 1 | 0 |
| 1 | Tamara Korpatsch (GER) | | | 1 | | | | | | | | 1 | 0 |
| 1 | Varvara Lepchenko (USA) | | | 1 | | | | | | | | 1 | 0 |
| 1 | Kurumi Nara (JPN) | | | 1 | | | | | | | | 1 | 0 |
| 1 | Kimberly Birrell (AUS) | | | | | 1 | | | | | | 1 | 0 |
| 1 | Caroline Dolehide (USA) | | | | | 1 | | | | | | 1 | 0 |
| 1 | Georgina García Pérez (ESP) | | | | | 1 | | | | | | 1 | 0 |
| 1 | Olga Ianchuk (UKR) | | | | | 1 | | | | | | 1 | 0 |
| 1 | Kaia Kanepi (EST) | | | | | 1 | | | | | | 1 | 0 |
| 1 | Sofia Kenin (USA) | | | | | 1 | | | | | | 1 | 0 |
| 1 | Marta Kostyuk (UKR) | | | | | 1 | | | | | | 1 | 0 |
| 1 | Katherine Sebov (CAN) | | | | | 1 | | | | | | 1 | 0 |
| 1 | Wang Yafan (CHN) | | | | | 1 | | | | | | 1 | 0 |
| 1 | Dayana Yastremska (UKR) | | | | | 1 | | | | | | 1 | 0 |
| 1 | Maryna Zanevska (BEL) | | | | | 1 | | | | | | 1 | 0 |
| 1 | Destanee Aiava (AUS) | | | | | | | 1 | | | | 1 | 0 |
| 1 | Timea Bacsinszky (SUI) | | | | | | | 1 | | | | 1 | 0 |
| 1 | Marie Bouzková (CZE) | | | | | | | 1 | | | | 1 | 0 |
| 1 | Cindy Burger (NED) | | | | | | | 1 | | | | 1 | 0 |
| 1 | Çağla Büyükakçay (TUR) | | | | | | | 1 | | | | 1 | 0 |
| 1 | Vitalia Diatchenko (RUS) | | | | | | | 1 | | | | 1 | 0 |
| 1 | Julia Grabher (AUT) | | | | | | | 1 | | | | 1 | 0 |
| 1 | Amandine Hesse (FRA) | | | | | | | 1 | | | | 1 | 0 |
| 1 | Mayo Hibi (JPN) | | | | | | | 1 | | | | 1 | 0 |
| 1 | Katharina Hobgarski (GER) | | | | | | | 1 | | | | 1 | 0 |
| 1 | Deniz Khazaniuk (ISR) | | | | | | | 1 | | | | 1 | 0 |
| 1 | Allie Kiick (USA) | | | | | | | 1 | | | | 1 | 0 |
| 1 | Barbora Krejčíková (CZE) | | | | | | | 1 | | | | 1 | 0 |
| 1 | Veronika Kudermetova (RUS) | | | | | | | 1 | | | | 1 | 0 |
| 1 | Liang En-shuo (TPE) | | | | | | | 1 | | | | 1 | 0 |
| 1 | Liu Fangzhou (CHN) | | | | | | | 1 | | | | 1 | 0 |
| 1 | Maia Lumsden (GBR) | | | | | | | 1 | | | | 1 | 0 |
| 1 | Tereza Martincová (CZE) | | | | | | | 1 | | | | 1 | 0 |
| 1 | Maria Mateas (USA) | | | | | | | 1 | | | | 1 | 0 |
| 1 | Marina Melnikova (RUS) | | | | | | | 1 | | | | 1 | 0 |
| 1 | Grace Min (USA) | | | | | | | 1 | | | | 1 | 0 |
| 1 | Chloé Paquet (FRA) | | | | | | | 1 | | | | 1 | 0 |
| 1 | Jessika Ponchet (FRA) | | | | | | | 1 | | | | 1 | 0 |
| 1 | Olga Sáez Larra (ESP) | | | | | | | 1 | | | | 1 | 0 |
| 1 | Laura Siegemund (GER) | | | | | | | 1 | | | | 1 | 0 |
| 1 | Sara Sorribes Tormo (ESP) | | | | | | | 1 | | | | 1 | 0 |
| 1 | Katie Swan (GBR) | | | | | | | 1 | | | | 1 | 0 |
| 1 | Caroline Werner (GER) | | | | | | | 1 | | | | 1 | 0 |
| 1 | Kimberley Zimmermann (BEL) | | | | | | | 1 | | | | 1 | 0 |
| 1 | Mirjam Björklund (SWE) | | | | | | | | | 1 | | 1 | 0 |
| 1 | Elysia Bolton (ROU) | | | | | | | | | 1 | | 1 | 0 |
| 1 | Evgeniya Burdina (RUS) | | | | | | | | | 1 | | 1 | 0 |
| 1 | Nastassja Burnett (ITA) | | | | | | | | | 1 | | 1 | 0 |
| 1 | Jodie Anna Burrage (GBR) | | | | | | | | | 1 | | 1 | 0 |
| 1 | Sara Cakarevic (FRA) | | | | | | | | | 1 | | 1 | 0 |
| 1 | María Lourdes Carlé (ARG) | | | | | | | | | 1 | | 1 | 0 |
| 1 | Amanda Carreras (GBR) | | | | | | | | | 1 | | 1 | 0 |
| 1 | Gabriela Cé (BRA) | | | | | | | | | 1 | | 1 | 0 |
| 1 | Hanna Chang (USA) | | | | | | | | | 1 | | 1 | 0 |
| 1 | Alina Charaeva (RUS) | | | | | | | | | 1 | | 1 | 0 |
| 1 | Patcharin Cheapchandej (THA) | | | | | | | | | 1 | | 1 | 0 |
| 1 | Elisabetta Cocciaretto (ITA) | | | | | | | | | 1 | | 1 | 0 |
| 1 | Alexandra Damaschin (ROU) | | | | | | | | | 1 | | 1 | 0 |
| 1 | Gai Ao (CHN) | | | | | | | | | 1 | | 1 | 0 |
| 1 | Lina Glushko (ISR) | | | | | | | | | 1 | | 1 | 0 |
| 1 | Paula Cristina Gonçalves (BRA) | | | | | | | | | 1 | | 1 | 0 |
| 1 | Varvara Gracheva (RUS) | | | | | | | | | 1 | | 1 | 0 |
| 1 | Guo Meiqi (CHN) | | | | | | | | | 1 | | 1 | 0 |
| 1 | Paige Mary Hourigan (NZL) | | | | | | | | | 1 | | 1 | 0 |
| 1 | Jeong Su-nam (KOR) | | | | | | | | | 1 | | 1 | 0 |
| 1 | Zoziya Kardava (GEO) | | | | | | | | | 1 | | 1 | 0 |
| 1 | Kim Da-hye (KOR) | | | | | | | | | 1 | | 1 | 0 |
| 1 | Raveena Kingsley (USA) | | | | | | | | | 1 | | 1 | 0 |
| 1 | Maria João Koehler (POR) | | | | | | | | | 1 | | 1 | 0 |
| 1 | Sinja Kraus (AUT) | | | | | | | | | 1 | | 1 | 0 |
| 1 | Daria Kudashova (RUS) | | | | | | | | | 1 | | 1 | 0 |
| 1 | Daria Lodikova (RUS) | | | | | | | | | 1 | | 1 | 0 |
| 1 | Guiomar Maristany (ESP) | | | | | | | | | 1 | | 1 | 0 |
| 1 | Sandy Marti (SUI) | | | | | | | | | 1 | | 1 | 0 |
| 1 | Rebeka Masarova (ESP) | | | | | | | | | 1 | | 1 | 0 |
| 1 | Jule Niemeier (GER) | | | | | | | | | 1 | | 1 | 0 |
| 1 | Oleksandra Oliynykova (CRO) | | | | | | | | | 1 | | 1 | 0 |
| 1 | Romina Oprandi (SUI) | | | | | | | | | 1 | | 1 | 0 |
| 1 | Camila Osorio (COL) | | | | | | | | | 1 | | 1 | 0 |
| 1 | Katyarina Paulenka (BLR) | | | | | | | | | 1 | | 1 | 0 |
| 1 | Júlia Payola (ESP) | | | | | | | | | 1 | | 1 | 0 |
| 1 | Alexandra Perper (MDA) | | | | | | | | | 1 | | 1 | 0 |
| 1 | Julia Rosenqvist (SWE) | | | | | | | | | 1 | | 1 | 0 |
| 1 | Lisa Sabino (SUI) | | | | | | | | | 1 | | 1 | 0 |
| 1 | Himeno Sakatsume (JPN) | | | | | | | | | 1 | | 1 | 0 |
| 1 | Mananchaya Sawangkaew (THA) | | | | | | | | | 1 | | 1 | 0 |
| 1 | Constance Sibille (FRA) | | | | | | | | | 1 | | 1 | 0 |
| 1 | Daria Snigur (UKR) | | | | | | | | | 1 | | 1 | 0 |
| 1 | Katerina Stewart (USA) | | | | | | | | | 1 | | 1 | 0 |
| 1 | Arina Gabriela Vasilescu (ROU) | | | | | | | | | 1 | | 1 | 0 |
| 1 | Draginja Vuković (SRB) | | | | | | | | | 1 | | 1 | 0 |
| 1 | Valeriya Yushchenko (RUS) | | | | | | | | | 1 | | 1 | 0 |
| 1 | Katarina Zavatska (UKR) | | | | | | | | | 1 | | 1 | 0 |
| 1 | Vendula Žovincová (CZE) | | | | | | | | | 1 | | 1 | 0 |
| 1 | Shuko Aoyama (JPN) | | 1 | | | | | | | | | 0 | 1 |
| 1 | Alexandra Cadanțu (ROU) | | 1 | | | | | | | | | 0 | 1 |
| 1 | Desirae Krawczyk (USA) | | 1 | | | | | | | | | 0 | 1 |
| 1 | Johanna Larsson (SWE) | | 1 | | | | | | | | | 0 | 1 |
| 1 | An-Sophie Mestach (BEL) | | 1 | | | | | | | | | 0 | 1 |
| 1 | Prarthana Thombare (IND) | | 1 | | | | | | | | | 0 | 1 |
| 1 | Galina Voskoboeva (KAZ) | | 1 | | | | | | | | | 0 | 1 |
| 1 | Yang Zhaoxuan (CHN) | | 1 | | | | | | | | | 0 | 1 |
| 1 | Rika Fujiwara (JPN) | | | | 1 | | | | | | | 0 | 1 |
| 1 | Petra Krejsová (CZE) | | | | 1 | | | | | | | 0 | 1 |
| 1 | Yuki Naito (JPN) | | | | 1 | | | | | | | 0 | 1 |
| 1 | Alison Bai (AUS) | | | | | | 1 | | | | | 0 | 1 |
| 1 | Sharon Fichman (CAN) | | | | | | 1 | | | | | 0 | 1 |
| 1 | Jovana Jakšić (SRB) | | | | | | 1 | | | | | 0 | 1 |
| 1 | Vania King (USA) | | | | | | 1 | | | | | 0 | 1 |
| 1 | Elitsa Kostova (BUL) | | | | | | 1 | | | | | 0 | 1 |
| 1 | Elena-Gabriela Ruse (ROU) | | | | | | 1 | | | | | 0 | 1 |
| 1 | Sílvia Soler Espinosa (ESP) | | | | | | 1 | | | | | 0 | 1 |
| 1 | Akgul Amanmuradova (UZB) | | | | | | | | 1 | | | 0 | 1 |
| 1 | Robin Anderson (USA) | | | | | | | | 1 | | | 0 | 1 |
| 1 | Emily Arbuthnott (GBR) | | | | | | | | 1 | | | 0 | 1 |
| 1 | Usue Maitane Arconada (USA) | | | | | | | | 1 | | | 0 | 1 |
| 1 | Carson Branstine (CAN) | | | | | | | | 1 | | | 0 | 1 |
| 1 | Chang Kai-chen (TPE) | | | | | | | | 1 | | | 0 | 1 |
| 1 | Nicoleta Dascălu (ROU) | | | | | | | | 1 | | | 0 | 1 |
| 1 | Katy Dunne (GBR) | | | | | | | | 1 | | | 0 | 1 |
| 1 | Misa Eguchi (JPN) | | | | | | | | 1 | | | 0 | 1 |
| 1 | Magdalena Fręch (POL) | | | | | | | | 1 | | | 0 | 1 |
| 1 | Dalma Gálfi (HUN) | | | | | | | | 1 | | | 0 | 1 |
| 1 | Beatrice Gumulya (INA) | | | | | | | | 1 | | | 0 | 1 |
| 1 | Guo Hanyu (CHN) | | | | | | | | 1 | | | 0 | 1 |
| 1 | Vivian Heisen (GER) | | | | | | | | 1 | | | 0 | 1 |
| 1 | Jessica Ho (USA) | | | | | | | | 1 | | | 0 | 1 |
| 1 | Miharu Imanishi (JPN) | | | | | | | | 1 | | | 0 | 1 |
| 1 | Maddison Inglis (AUS) | | | | | | | | 1 | | | 0 | 1 |
| 1 | Miyabi Inoue (JPN) | | | | | | | | 1 | | | 0 | 1 |
| 1 | Darija Jurak (CRO) | | | | | | | | 1 | | | 0 | 1 |
| 1 | Haruka Kaji (JPN) | | | | | | | | 1 | | | 0 | 1 |
| 1 | Robu Kajitani (JPN) | | | | | | | | 1 | | | 0 | 1 |
| 1 | Ekaterina Kazionova (RUS) | | | | | | | | 1 | | | 0 | 1 |
| 1 | Emma Laine (FIN) | | | | | | | | 1 | | | 0 | 1 |
| 1 | Nicha Lertpitaksinchai (THA) | | | | | | | | 1 | | | 0 | 1 |
| 1 | Polina Leykina (RUS) | | | | | | | | 1 | | | 0 | 1 |
| 1 | Jamie Loeb (USA) | | | | | | | | 1 | | | 0 | 1 |
| 1 | Genevieve Lorbergs (AUS) | | | | | | | | 1 | | | 0 | 1 |
| 1 | Lu Jingjing (CHN) | | | | | | | | 1 | | | 0 | 1 |
| 1 | Linnéa Malmqvist (SWE) | | | | | | | | 1 | | | 0 | 1 |
| 1 | Maegan Manasse (USA) | | | | | | | | 1 | | | 0 | 1 |
| 1 | Sanaz Marand (USA) | | | | | | | | 1 | | | 0 | 1 |
| 1 | Mai Minokoshi (JPN) | | | | | | | | 1 | | | 0 | 1 |
| 1 | Tayisiya Morderger (GER) | | | | | | | | 1 | | | 0 | 1 |
| 1 | Yana Morderger (GER) | | | | | | | | 1 | | | 0 | 1 |
| 1 | Ingrid Neel (USA) | | | | | | | | 1 | | | 0 | 1 |
| 1 | Megumi Nishimoto (JPN) | | | | | | | | 1 | | | 0 | 1 |
| 1 | Kyōka Okamura (JPN) | | | | | | | | 1 | | | 0 | 1 |
| 1 | Nina Potočnik (SLO) | | | | | | | | 1 | | | 0 | 1 |
| 1 | Jessy Rompies (INA) | | | | | | | | 1 | | | 0 | 1 |
| 1 | Camilla Rosatello (ITA) | | | | | | | | 1 | | | 0 | 1 |
| 1 | Amra Sadiković (SUI) | | | | | | | | 1 | | | 0 | 1 |
| 1 | Ana Sofía Sánchez (MEX) | | | | | | | | 1 | | | 0 | 1 |
| 1 | Erika Sema (JPN) | | | | | | | | 1 | | | 0 | 1 |
| 1 | İpek Soylu (TUR) | | | | | | | | 1 | | | 0 | 1 |
| 1 | Fanny Stollár (HUN) | | | | | | | | 1 | | | 0 | 1 |
| 1 | Minori Yonehara (JPN) | | | | | | | | 1 | | | 0 | 1 |
| 1 | Camilla Abbate (ITA) | | | | | | | | | | 1 | 0 | 1 |
| 1 | Ola Abou Zekry (EGY) | | | | | | | | | | 1 | 0 | 1 |
| 1 | Minami Akiyama (JPN) | | | | | | | | | | 1 | 0 | 1 |
| 1 | Fatma Al-Nabhani (OMA) | | | | | | | | | | 1 | 0 | 1 |
| 1 | Lamis Alhussein Abdel Aziz (EGY) | | | | | | | | | | 1 | 0 | 1 |
| 1 | Carolina Alves (BRA) | | | | | | | | | | 1 | 0 | 1 |
| 1 | Cemre Anıl (TUR) | | | | | | | | | | 1 | 0 | 1 |
| 1 | Mira Antonitsch (AUT) | | | | | | | | | | 1 | 0 | 1 |
| 1 | Anna Arkadianou (GRE) | | | | | | | | | | 1 | 0 | 1 |
| 1 | Petia Arshinkova (BUL) | | | | | | | | | | 1 | 0 | 1 |
| 1 | Célestine Avomo Ella (GAB) | | | | | | | | | | 1 | 0 | 1 |
| 1 | Ulyana Ayzatulina (RUS) | | | | | | | | | | 1 | 0 | 1 |
| 1 | Polina Bakhmutkina (RUS) | | | | | | | | | | 1 | 0 | 1 |
| 1 | Paula Barañano (ARG) | | | | | | | | | | 1 | 0 | 1 |
| 1 | Sowjanya Bavisetti (IND) | | | | | | | | | | 1 | 0 | 1 |
| 1 | Chiraz Bechri (TUN) | | | | | | | | | | 1 | 0 | 1 |
| 1 | Kseniia Becker (GER) | | | | | | | | | | 1 | 0 | 1 |
| 1 | Julie Belgraver (FRA) | | | | | | | | | | 1 | 0 | 1 |
| 1 | Loudmilla Bencheikh (FRA) | | | | | | | | | | 1 | 0 | 1 |
| 1 | Karolína Beránková (CZE) | | | | | | | | | | 1 | 0 | 1 |
| 1 | Riya Bhatia (IND) | | | | | | | | | | 1 | 0 | 1 |
| 1 | Martina Biagianti (ITA) | | | | | | | | | | 1 | 0 | 1 |
| 1 | Michaela Boev (BEL) | | | | | | | | | | 1 | 0 | 1 |
| 1 | Elena Bogdan (ROU) | | | | | | | | | | 1 | 0 | 1 |
| 1 | Mariam Bolkvadze (GEO) | | | | | | | | | | 1 | 0 | 1 |
| 1 | Brynn Boren (USA) | | | | | | | | | | 1 | 0 | 1 |
| 1 | Noelia Bouzó Zanotti (ESP) | | | | | | | | | | 1 | 0 | 1 |
| 1 | Lucia Bronzetti (ITA) | | | | | | | | | | 1 | 0 | 1 |
| 1 | Astrid Wanja Brune Olsen (NOR) | | | | | | | | | | 1 | 0 | 1 |
| 1 | Selma Ștefania Cadar (ROU) | | | | | | | | | | 1 | 0 | 1 |
| 1 | Irina Cantos Siemers (GER) | | | | | | | | | | 1 | 0 | 1 |
| 1 | Marian Capadocia (PHI) | | | | | | | | | | 1 | 0 | 1 |
| 1 | Kerrie Cartwright (BAH) | | | | | | | | | | 1 | 0 | 1 |
| 1 | Alise Čerņecka (LAT) | | | | | | | | | | 1 | 0 | 1 |
| 1 | Chen Jiahui (CHN) | | | | | | | | | | 1 | 0 | 1 |
| 1 | Yuki Kristina Chiang (USA) | | | | | | | | | | 1 | 0 | 1 |
| 1 | Anastasia Chikalkina (RUS) | | | | | | | | | | 1 | 0 | 1 |
| 1 | Paulina Czarnik (POL) | | | | | | | | | | 1 | 0 | 1 |
| 1 | Émeline Dartron (FRA) | | | | | | | | | | 1 | 0 | 1 |
| 1 | Melania Delai (ITA) | | | | | | | | | | 1 | 0 | 1 |
| 1 | Dariya Detkovskaya (KAZ) | | | | | | | | | | 1 | 0 | 1 |
| 1 | Dewi Dijkman (NED) | | | | | | | | | | 1 | 0 | 1 |
| 1 | Yekaterina Dmitrichenko (KAZ) | | | | | | | | | | 1 | 0 | 1 |
| 1 | Mariana Dražić (CRO) | | | | | | | | | | 1 | 0 | 1 |
| 1 | Jenny Dürst (SUI) | | | | | | | | | | 1 | 0 | 1 |
| 1 | Mia Eklund (FIN) | | | | | | | | | | 1 | 0 | 1 |
| 1 | Anna Gabric (GER) | | | | | | | | | | 1 | 0 | 1 |
| 1 | Anja Gal (SLO) | | | | | | | | | | 1 | 0 | 1 |
| 1 | Joanna Garland (TPE) | | | | | | | | | | 1 | 0 | 1 |
| 1 | Elena Gemović (SRB) | | | | | | | | | | 1 | 0 | 1 |
| 1 | Elaine Genovese (MLT) | | | | | | | | | | 1 | 0 | 1 |
| 1 | Britt Geukens (BEL) | | | | | | | | | | 1 | 0 | 1 |
| 1 | Andreea Ghițescu (ROU) | | | | | | | | | | 1 | 0 | 1 |
| 1 | Sheila Glavaš (SLO) | | | | | | | | | | 1 | 0 | 1 |
| 1 | Nadezda Gorbachkova (RUS) | | | | | | | | | | 1 | 0 | 1 |
| 1 | Chiara Grimm (SUI) | | | | | | | | | | 1 | 0 | 1 |
| 1 | Klára Hájková (CZE) | | | | | | | | | | 1 | 0 | 1 |
| 1 | Mylène Halemai (FRA) | | | | | | | | | | 1 | 0 | 1 |
| 1 | Catherine Harrison (USA) | | | | | | | | | | 1 | 0 | 1 |
| 1 | Isabelle Haverlag (NED) | | | | | | | | | | 1 | 0 | 1 |
| 1 | Julia Helbet (MDA) | | | | | | | | | | 1 | 0 | 1 |
| 1 | Anna Hertel (POL) | | | | | | | | | | 1 | 0 | 1 |
| 1 | Jessica Hinojosa Gómez (MEX) | | | | | | | | | | 1 | 0 | 1 |
| 1 | Merel Hoedt (NED) | | | | | | | | | | 1 | 0 | 1 |
| 1 | Ida Jarlskog (SWE) | | | | | | | | | | 1 | 0 | 1 |
| 1 | Paulina Jastrzębska (POL) | | | | | | | | | | 1 | 0 | 1 |
| 1 | Jeong Yeong-won (KOR) | | | | | | | | | | 1 | 0 | 1 |
| 1 | Masa Jovanovic (AUS) | | | | | | | | | | 1 | 0 | 1 |
| 1 | Jung So-hee (KOR) | | | | | | | | | | 1 | 0 | 1 |
| 1 | Rifanty Kahfiani (INA) | | | | | | | | | | 1 | 0 | 1 |
| 1 | Anastasia Kharitonova (RUS) | | | | | | | | | | 1 | 0 | 1 |
| 1 | Joelle Kissell (USA) | | | | | | | | | | 1 | 0 | 1 |
| 1 | Melanie Klaffner (AUT) | | | | | | | | | | 1 | 0 | 1 |
| 1 | Anna Klasen (GER) | | | | | | | | | | 1 | 0 | 1 |
| 1 | Romy Kölzer (GER) | | | | | | | | | | 1 | 0 | 1 |
| 1 | Maryna Kolb (UKR) | | | | | | | | | | 1 | 0 | 1 |
| 1 | Nadiya Kolb (UKR) | | | | | | | | | | 1 | 0 | 1 |
| 1 | Maria Krupenina (RUS) | | | | | | | | | | 1 | 0 | 1 |
| 1 | Zhibek Kulambayeva (KAZ) | | | | | | | | | | 1 | 0 | 1 |
| 1 | Yulia Kulikova (RUS) | | | | | | | | | | 1 | 0 | 1 |
| 1 | Nathaly Kurata (BRA) | | | | | | | | | | 1 | 0 | 1 |
| 1 | Aneta Laboutková (CZE) | | | | | | | | | | 1 | 0 | 1 |
| 1 | Gemma Lairón Navarro (ESP) | | | | | | | | | | 1 | 0 | 1 |
| 1 | Sarah Lee (USA) | | | | | | | | | | 1 | 0 | 1 |
| 1 | Adrijana Lekaj (KOS) | | | | | | | | | | 1 | 0 | 1 |
| 1 | Liu Siqi (CHN) | | | | | | | | | | 1 | 0 | 1 |
| 1 | Chiara Lommer (USA) | | | | | | | | | | 1 | 0 | 1 |
| 1 | Lu Jiaxi (CHN) | | | | | | | | | | 1 | 0 | 1 |
| 1 | Vanda Lukács (HUN) | | | | | | | | | | 1 | 0 | 1 |
| 1 | Connie Ma (USA) | | | | | | | | | | 1 | 0 | 1 |
| 1 | Lisa-Marie Mätschke (GER) | | | | | | | | | | 1 | 0 | 1 |
| 1 | Anna Makhorkina (RUS) | | | | | | | | | | 1 | 0 | 1 |
| 1 | Elena Malõgina (EST) | | | | | | | | | | 1 | 0 | 1 |
| 1 | Elizabeth Mandlik (USA) | | | | | | | | | | 1 | 0 | 1 |
| 1 | Yasmine Mansouri (FRA) | | | | | | | | | | 1 | 0 | 1 |
| 1 | Maria Masini (ITA) | | | | | | | | | | 1 | 0 | 1 |
| 1 | Rasheeda McAdoo (USA) | | | | | | | | | | 1 | 0 | 1 |
| 1 | Barbora Miklová (CZE) | | | | | | | | | | 1 | 0 | 1 |
| 1 | Tamachan Momkoonthod (THA) | | | | | | | | | | 1 | 0 | 1 |
| 1 | Melissa Morales (GUA) | | | | | | | | | | 1 | 0 | 1 |
| 1 | Victoria Muntean (FRA) | | | | | | | | | | 1 | 0 | 1 |
| 1 | Anastasia Nefedova (USA) | | | | | | | | | | 1 | 0 | 1 |
| 1 | Stephanie Nemtsova (USA) | | | | | | | | | | 1 | 0 | 1 |
| 1 | Ng Kwan-yau (HKG) | | | | | | | | | | 1 | 0 | 1 |
| 1 | Nora Niedmers (GER) | | | | | | | | | | 1 | 0 | 1 |
| 1 | Saara Orav (EST) | | | | | | | | | | 1 | 0 | 1 |
| 1 | Fanny Östlund (SWE) | | | | | | | | | | 1 | 0 | 1 |
| 1 | Park Sang-hee (KOR) | | | | | | | | | | 1 | 0 | 1 |
| 1 | Nuria Párrizas Díaz (ESP) | | | | | | | | | | 1 | 0 | 1 |
| 1 | Maria Patrascu (CAN) | | | | | | | | | | 1 | 0 | 1 |
| 1 | María Paulina Pérez (COL) | | | | | | | | | | 1 | 0 | 1 |
| 1 | Paula Andrea Pérez (COL) | | | | | | | | | | 1 | 0 | 1 |
| 1 | Eduarda Piai (BRA) | | | | | | | | | | 1 | 0 | 1 |
| 1 | Gianna Pielet (USA) | | | | | | | | | | 1 | 0 | 1 |
| 1 | Kariann Pierre-Louis (USA) | | | | | | | | | | 1 | 0 | 1 |
| 1 | Valeriya Pogrebnyak (RUS) | | | | | | | | | | 1 | 0 | 1 |
| 1 | Lisa Ponomar (GER) | | | | | | | | | | 1 | 0 | 1 |
| 1 | Anna Popescu (GBR) | | | | | | | | | | 1 | 0 | 1 |
| 1 | Anastasiya Poplavska (UKR) | | | | | | | | | | 1 | 0 | 1 |
| 1 | Aleksandra Pospelova (RUS) | | | | | | | | | | 1 | 0 | 1 |
| 1 | Linda Prenkovic (GER) | | | | | | | | | | 1 | 0 | 1 |
| 1 | Iva Primorac (CRO) | | | | | | | | | | 1 | 0 | 1 |
| 1 | Laetitia Pulchartová (CZE) | | | | | | | | | | 1 | 0 | 1 |
| 1 | Linda Puppendahl (GER) | | | | | | | | | | 1 | 0 | 1 |
| 1 | Kamilla Rakhimova (RUS) | | | | | | | | | | 1 | 0 | 1 |
| 1 | Nadia Ravita (INA) | | | | | | | | | | 1 | 0 | 1 |
| 1 | Sabrina Rittberger (GER) | | | | | | | | | | 1 | 0 | 1 |
| 1 | Katriin Saar (EST) | | | | | | | | | | 1 | 0 | 1 |
| 1 | Syna Schreiber (GER) | | | | | | | | | | 1 | 0 | 1 |
| 1 | Sarah-Rebecca Sekulic (GER) | | | | | | | | | | 1 | 0 | 1 |
| 1 | Chinatsu Shimizu (JPN) | | | | | | | | | | 1 | 0 | 1 |
| 1 | Minami Shuto (JPN) | | | | | | | | | | 1 | 0 | 1 |
| 1 | Alina Silich (RUS) | | | | | | | | | | 1 | 0 | 1 |
| 1 | Eden Silva (GBR) | | | | | | | | | | 1 | 0 | 1 |
| 1 | Jelena Simić (BIH) | | | | | | | | | | 1 | 0 | 1 |
| 1 | Anna Sisková (CZE) | | | | | | | | | | 1 | 0 | 1 |
| 1 | Alicia Smith (AUS) | | | | | | | | | | 1 | 0 | 1 |
| 1 | Vitalia Stamat (MDA) | | | | | | | | | | 1 | 0 | 1 |
| 1 | Julia Stamatova (BUL) | | | | | | | | | | 1 | 0 | 1 |
| 1 | Joëlle Steur (GER) | | | | | | | | | | 1 | 0 | 1 |
| 1 | Natasha Subhash (USA) | | | | | | | | | | 1 | 0 | 1 |
| 1 | Natalie Suk (USA) | | | | | | | | | | 1 | 0 | 1 |
| 1 | Sun Xuliu (CHN) | | | | | | | | | | 1 | 0 | 1 |
| 1 | Marlies Szupper (AUT) | | | | | | | | | | 1 | 0 | 1 |
| 1 | Shalimar Talbi (BLR) | | | | | | | | | | 1 | 0 | 1 |
| 1 | Gabriela Nicole Tătăruș (ROU) | | | | | | | | | | 1 | 0 | 1 |
| 1 | Isabella Tcherkes Zade (ITA) | | | | | | | | | | 1 | 0 | 1 |
| 1 | Anastasia Tikhonova (RUS) | | | | | | | | | | 1 | 0 | 1 |
| 1 | Panna Udvardy (HUN) | | | | | | | | | | 1 | 0 | 1 |
| 1 | Kanika Vaidya (IND) | | | | | | | | | | 1 | 0 | 1 |
| 1 | Ani Vangelova (BUL) | | | | | | | | | | 1 | 0 | 1 |
| 1 | Chelsea Vanhoutte (BEL) | | | | | | | | | | 1 | 0 | 1 |
| 1 | Kateřina Vaňková (CZE) | | | | | | | | | | 1 | 0 | 1 |
| 1 | Eliessa Vanlangendonck (BEL) | | | | | | | | | | 1 | 0 | 1 |
| 1 | Anastasiya Vasylyeva (UKR) | | | | | | | | | | 1 | 0 | 1 |
| 1 | Rosa Vicens Mas (ESP) | | | | | | | | | | 1 | 0 | 1 |
| 1 | Alexandra Viktorovitch (SWE) | | | | | | | | | | 1 | 0 | 1 |
| 1 | Andrea Renée Villarreal (MEX) | | | | | | | | | | 1 | 0 | 1 |
| 1 | Maria Vittoria Viviani (ITA) | | | | | | | | | | 1 | 0 | 1 |
| 1 | Ingrid Vojčináková (SVK) | | | | | | | | | | 1 | 0 | 1 |
| 1 | Eva Marie Voracek (GER) | | | | | | | | | | 1 | 0 | 1 |
| 1 | Amber Washington (USA) | | | | | | | | | | 1 | 0 | 1 |
| 1 | Kirsten-Andrea Weedon (GUA) | | | | | | | | | | 1 | 0 | 1 |
| 1 | Madison Westby (USA) | | | | | | | | | | 1 | 0 | 1 |
| 1 | Tiffany William (GBR) | | | | | | | | | | 1 | 0 | 1 |
| 1 | Varunya Wongteanchai (THA) | | | | | | | | | | 1 | 0 | 1 |
| 1 | Aiko Yoshitomi (JPN) | | | | | | | | | | 1 | 0 | 1 |
| 1 | Yu Min-hwa (KOR) | | | | | | | | | | 1 | 0 | 1 |
| 1 | Lisa Zaar (SWE) | | | | | | | | | | 1 | 0 | 1 |
| 1 | Maribella Zamarripa (USA) | | | | | | | | | | 1 | 0 | 1 |
| 1 | Zhao Qianqian (CHN) | | | | | | | | | | 1 | 0 | 1 |
| 1 | Angelina Zhuravleva (RUS) | | | | | | | | | | 1 | 0 | 1 |
| 1 | Joanne Züger (SUI) | | | | | | | | | | 1 | 0 | 1 |

=== Titles won by nation ===
Updated as of December 24

| Total | Nation | $100K | | $80K | | $60K | | $25K | | $15K | | Total | |
| Total | Nation | S | D | S | D | S | D | S | D | S | D | S | D |
|---|---|---|---|---|---|---|---|---|---|---|---|---|---|
| 115 | Russia (RUS) | | 2 | | 2 | 2 | 5 | 11 | 19 | 29 | 45 | 42 | 73 |
| 93 | United States (USA) | 2 | 4 | 4 | 4 | 7 | 10 | 8 | 12 | 12 | 30 | 33 | 60 |
| 76 | Romania (ROU) | | 1 | | 1 | | 3 | 4 | 10 | 30 | 27 | 34 | 42 |
| 54 | Italy (ITA) | | | | | | | 4 | 9 | 20 | 21 | 24 | 30 |
| 54 | Great Britain (GBR) | | | | | 1 | 6 | 7 | 12 | 11 | 17 | 18 | 36 |
| 52 | China (CHN) | 2 | 2 | | | 5 | 3 | 10 | 15 | 5 | 10 | 22 | 30 |
| 47 | Czech Republic (CZE) | 1 | | | 1 | | | 10 | 6 | 12 | 17 | 23 | 24 |
| 45 | Spain (ESP) | | | | | 2 | 2 | 8 | 6 | 11 | 16 | 21 | 24 |
| 45 | Japan (JPN) | 1 | 2 | 1 | 1 | 2 | 2 | 7 | 15 | 2 | 12 | 13 | 32 |
| 40 | Australia (AUS) | | 2 | | | 3 | 7 | 9 | 13 | 1 | 5 | 13 | 27 |
| 36 | France (FRA) | | | 1 | | | | 9 | 5 | 9 | 12 | 19 | 17 |
| 35 | Netherlands (NED) | | | 1 | | 1 | 2 | 4 | 9 | 4 | 14 | 10 | 25 |
| 33 | Belgium (BEL) | 1 | 2 | | | 1 | 1 | 3 | 5 | 10 | 10 | 15 | 18 |
| 33 | Germany (GER) | | | 1 | | | | 5 | 5 | 3 | 19 | 9 | 24 |
| 31 | Switzerland (SUI) | 1 | | 2 | | | 1 | 2 | 4 | 13 | 8 | 18 | 13 |
| 29 | Ukraine (UKR) | | | | | 2 | 1 | 5 | 3 | 10 | 8 | 17 | 12 |
| 28 | Serbia (SRB) | 1 | | | 1 | 2 | 2 | 6 | 3 | 2 | 11 | 11 | 17 |
| 27 | Slovenia (SLO) | | | | | 1 | 1 | 8 | 2 | 7 | 8 | 16 | 11 |
| 25 | Chile (CHI) | | | | 2 | | | | 3 | 9 | 11 | 9 | 16 |
| 24 | Chinese Taipei (TPE) | | | | | | | 3 | 8 | 6 | 7 | 9 | 15 |
| 22 | Poland (POL) | | | | | 2 | | 2 | 6 | 5 | 7 | 9 | 13 |
| 20 | Bulgaria (BUL) | | | | | | 2 | | 4 | 8 | 6 | 8 | 12 |
| 19 | Belarus (BLR) | 1 | | | | 1 | | 2 | 3 | 4 | 8 | 8 | 11 |
| 19 | Thailand (THA) | | 1 | | | | | 2 | 2 | 6 | 8 | 8 | 11 |
| 18 | Slovakia (SVK) | 2 | 1 | | | 1 | 3 | | 5 | 3 | 3 | 6 | 12 |
| 17 | Sweden (SWE) | 1 | 1 | | 1 | | | | 2 | 5 | 7 | 6 | 11 |
| 17 | South Korea (KOR) | | | | | | | 1 | 7 | 4 | 5 | 5 | 12 |
| 16 | Brazil (BRA) | | | | | | 2 | | 4 | 3 | 7 | 3 | 13 |
| 15 | India (IND) | | 1 | | | | 2 | 5 | 3 | | 4 | 5 | 10 |
| 15 | Argentina (ARG) | | | | | | 1 | 2 | 3 | 3 | 6 | 5 | 10 |
| 15 | Mexico (MEX) | | 1 | | | | 2 | 1 | 7 | 1 | 3 | 2 | 13 |
| 14 | Turkey (TUR) | | | | 1 | | 2 | 5 | 1 | 2 | 3 | 7 | 7 |
| 14 | Israel (ISR) | | | | | 1 | | 3 | | 3 | 7 | 7 | 7 |
| 14 | Hungary (HUN) | | | | | | 1 | 1 | 5 | 2 | 5 | 3 | 11 |
| 13 | Canada (CAN) | | | | | 1 | 1 | 4 | 1 | 3 | 3 | 8 | 5 |
| 12 | Georgia (GEO) | | | 1 | | 1 | | 1 | 4 | 1 | 4 | 4 | 8 |
| 12 | Greece (GRE) | | | | | | 1 | | 5 | 2 | 4 | 2 | 10 |
| 11 | Croatia (CRO) | | | | | 1 | | 1 | 1 | 3 | 5 | 5 | 6 |
| 11 | New Zealand (NZL) | | | | 2 | | | | 5 | 2 | 2 | 2 | 9 |
| 10 | Paraguay (PAR) | | | | | | | | 2 | 2 | 6 | 2 | 8 |
| 8 | Uzbekistan (UZB) | | | | | 1 | | 3 | 4 | | | 4 | 4 |
| 8 | Egypt (EGY) | | | | | | | | 1 | 4 | 3 | 4 | 4 |
| 7 | Austria (AUT) | | | | | | | 3 | | 1 | 3 | 4 | 3 |
| 7 | Finland (FIN) | | | | | | | | 1 | 3 | 3 | 3 | 4 |
| 7 | Norway (NOR) | | | | | | 1 | | 3 | 2 | 1 | 2 | 5 |
| 7 | Bosnia and Herzegovina (BIH) | | | | | | | | | 2 | 5 | 2 | 5 |
| 7 | Indonesia (INA) | | | | | | | | 3 | 1 | 3 | 1 | 6 |
| 6 | Luxembourg (LUX) | | | | | | | 4 | | 2 | | 6 | 0 |
| 6 | Colombia (COL) | | | 1 | | 1 | 1 | | | 2 | 1 | 4 | 2 |
| 6 | Kazakhstan (KAZ) | | 1 | | 1 | | | | 2 | | 2 | 0 | 6 |
| 6 | Venezuela (VEN) | | | | | | 1 | | 4 | | 1 | 0 | 6 |
| 5 | Hong Kong (HKG) | | | | | | 1 | | | 3 | 1 | 3 | 2 |
| 5 | Portugal (POR) | | | | | | | | | 3 | 2 | 3 | 2 |
| 5 | Latvia (LAT) | | | | | | | 1 | 1 | 1 | 2 | 2 | 3 |
| 5 | Montenegro (MNE) | | | | | | | | 4 | 1 | | 1 | 4 |
| 4 | Moldova (MDA) | | | | | | | | | 2 | 2 | 2 | 2 |
| 4 | Denmark (DEN) | | | | | | | | 1 | | 3 | 0 | 4 |
| 3 | Estonia (EST) | | | | | 1 | | | | | 2 | 1 | 2 |
| 3 | Kyrgyzstan (KGZ) | | | | | | | | | 1 | 2 | 1 | 2 |
| 2 | Liechtenstein (LIE) | | | | | | | 2 | | | | 2 | 0 |
| 2 | Tunisia (TUN) | 1 | | | | | | | | | 1 | 1 | 1 |
| 2 | Ecuador (ECU) | | | | | | | | | 1 | 1 | 1 | 1 |
| 2 | South Africa (RSA) | | | | | | | | 2 | | | 0 | 2 |
| 2 | Bolivia (BOL) | | | | | | | | | | 2 | 0 | 2 |
| 2 | Cambodia (CAM) | | | | | | | | | | 2 | 0 | 2 |
| 1 | Bahamas (BAH) | | | | | | | | | | 1 | 0 | 1 |
| 1 | Gabon (GAB) | | | | | | | | | | 1 | 0 | 1 |
| 1 | Guatemala (GUA) | | | | | | | | | | 1 | 0 | 1 |
| 1 | Kosovo (KOS) | | | | | | | | | | 1 | 0 | 1 |
| 1 | Malta (MLT) | | | | | | | | | | 1 | 0 | 1 |
| 1 | Oman (OMA) | | | | | | | | | | 1 | 0 | 1 |
| 1 | Philippines (PHI) | | | | | | | | | | 1 | 0 | 1 |

- Anastasia Dețiuc started representing the Czech Republic in February, she won one singles title while representing Moldova.
- Elena Rybakina started representing Kazakhstan in June, she won one singles and one doubles title while representing Russia.
- Kseniia Becker started representing Germany in October, she won one doubles title while representing Russia.
- Raluca Șerban started representing Cyprus in December, she won three singles and five doubles titles while representing Romania.

== See also ==
- 2018 WTA Tour
- 2018 WTA 125K series
- 2018 ATP World Tour
- 2018 ATP Challenger Tour
- 2018 ITF Men's Circuit
