= Kulikovo =

Kulikovo may refer to:

- The Battle of Kulikovo, fought in 1380 between armies of the Golden Horde, under the command of Mamai, and various Russian principalities, under the united command of Prince Dmitry of Moscow; widely regarded by Russian historians as the turning point at which Mongol influence began to wane and Moscow's power began to rise
  - Kulikovo Field, in Tula Oblast, Russia, home to a museum complex to commemorate the above battle
- Kulikovo, Arkhangelsk Oblast, a Russian rural locality (a settlement)
- Kulikovo, Dobryansky District, a Russian rural locality (a village) within Perm Krai
- Kulikovo, Kaduysky District, Vologda Oblast, a Russian rural locality (a village)
- Kulikovo, Zelenogradsky District, a Russian rural locality (a village)

== See also ==
- Kulikov (disambiguation)
- Kulykove Pole, a garden square and necropolis in Odesa, Ukraine, possibly named after the Battle of Kulikovo
