= Kulikov =

Kulikov (Russian: Кулико́в), or Kulikova (feminine; Кулико́ва), is a Russian surname. Notable people with the surname include:

== Kulikov ==
- Anatoly Kulikov (b. 1946), a Russian Minister of the Interior (1995-1997)
- Artyom Kulikov (b. 1980), a Russian football manager and a former player
- Denis Kulikov (b. 2004), an Israeli football player
- Dmitri Kulikov (footballer) (b. 1977), an Estonian football player
- Dmitri Kulikov (ice hockey) (b. 1990), a Russian ice hockey player
- Georgi Kulikov (swimmer) (b. 1947), a Latvian swimmer
- Ivan Kulikov, (1875–1941), a Russian painter
- Konstantin Kulikov (1896–1944), Soviet general
- Vasily Kulikov (1921) (1921–1943), Hero of the Soviet Union
- Vasily Kulikov (1923) (1923–1991), Hero of the Soviet Union
- Viktor Kulikov (1921–2013), a Soviet military commander, Marshal of the Soviet Union
- Viktor Nikolayevich Kulikov (1913–1948), a Soviet aircraft pilot and Hero of the Soviet Union
- Vladislav Kulikov (b. 1971), a Russian swimmer
- Vladislav Kulikov (b. 1996), a Russian professional racing cyclist
- Yevgeny Kulikov (b. 1950), a Soviet speed skater

== Kulikova ==
- Anastasia Kulikova
- Irina Kulikova (model) (b. 1991), a Russian fashion model
- Irina Kulikova (guitarist)
- Svetlana Kulikova
- Regina Kulikova
- Yekaterina Kulikova

== See also ==
- Kulikov, Volgograd Oblast, a rural locality in Russia
- Kulik
- Kulikovo (disambiguation)
