= 2018 Fed Cup Europe/Africa Zone Group I – play-offs =

Subsection of tennis competition

The play-offs of the 2018 Fed Cup Europe/Africa Zone Group I were the final stages of the Group I zonal competition involving teams from Europe and Africa. Using the positions determined in their pools, the fourteen teams faced off to determine their placing in the 2018 Fed Cup Europe/Africa Zone Group I. The top two teams advanced to World Group II play-offs, and the bottom two teams were relegated to the Europe/Africa Zone Group II.

== Pool results ==
Placing	Pool A	Pool B	Pool C	Pool D
1	Serbia	Great Britain	Hungary	Latvia
2	Bulgaria	Estonia	Croatia	Poland
3	—	—	Slovenia	Turkey
4	Georgia	Portugal	Sweden	Austria

== Promotional play-offs ==
The first placed teams of each pool were drawn in head-to-head rounds. The winner of each round advanced to the World Group II play-offs.

=== Serbia vs. Latvia ===
Serbia
1
Tallink Tennis Centre, Tallinn, Estonia
10 February
Hard (indoors)

Latvia
2

			1	2	3
1	(Serbia) (Latvia)	Olga Danilović; Anastasija Sevastova	6; 2	6; 4
2	(Serbia) (Latvia)	Dejana Radanović; Jeļena Ostapenko	2; 6	1; 6
3	(Serbia) (Latvia)	Olga Danilović / Bojana Marinković; Jeļena Ostapenko / Anastasija Sevastova	1; 6	2; 6

=== Great Britain vs. Hungary ===
Great Britain
2
Tallink Tennis Centre, Tallinn, Estonia
10 February
Hard (indoors)

Hungary
0

			1	2	3
1	(United Kingdom) (Hungary)	Heather Watson; Dalma Gálfi	3; 6	6; 1	6; 4
2	(United Kingdom) (Hungary)	Johanna Konta; Fanny Stollár	6; 3	6; 1
3	(United Kingdom) (Hungary)	Katie Boulter / Anna Smith; Dalma Gálfi / Fanny Stollár				not played

== 5th place play-off ==
The runner-up teams from pools A and D, and B and C competed in order to establish which two teams would place joint fifth in the final standings and which two would place joint seventh.

=== Bulgaria vs. Poland ===
Bulgaria
0
Tallink Tennis Centre, Tallinn, Estonia
10 February
Hard (indoors)

Poland
2

			1	2	3
1	(Bulgaria) (Poland)	Petia Arshinkova; Iga Świątek	0; 6	4; 6
2	(Bulgaria) (Poland)	Isabella Shinikova; Magdalena Fręch	5; 7	3; 6
3	(Bulgaria) (Poland)	Petia Arshinkova / Julia Terziyska; Alicja Rosolska / Iga Świątek				not played

=== Estonia vs. Croatia ===
Estonia
2
Tallink Tennis Centre, Tallinn, Estonia
10 February
Hard (indoors)

Croatia
1

			1	2	3
1	(Estonia) (Croatia)	Saara Orav; Ana Biškić	3; 6	6; 4	6; 2
2	(Estonia) (Croatia)	Katriin Saar; Tena Lukas	6; 2	5; 7	1; 6
3	(Estonia) (Croatia)	Elena Malygina / Saara Orav; Ana Biškić / Tena Lukas	6; 2	4; 6	7; 5

== Relegation play-offs ==
The teams placing last in each pool competed to keep their place in the Europe/Africa Zone Group I. The bottom-placed team from group A faced the bottom-placed team from Group D, whilst Group B's and Group C's bottom-placed teams faced off. The losers were relegated to the 2019 Europe/Africa Zone Group II.

=== Georgia vs. Austria ===
Georgia
2
Tallink Tennis Centre, Tallinn, Estonia
10 February
Hard (indoors)

Austria
1

			1	2	3
1	(Georgia (country)) (Austria)	Sofia Shapatava; Julia Grabher	6; 3	4; 6	6; 4
2	(Georgia (country)) (Austria)	Ekaterine Gorgodze; Barbara Haas	6^{5} 7^{7}	6; 2	3; 6
3	(Georgia (country)) (Austria)	Oksana Kalashnikova / Sofia Shapatava; Julia Grabher / Barbara Haas	6; 4	3; 6	6; 2

=== Portugal vs. Sweden ===
Portugal
0
Tallink Tennis Centre, Tallinn, Estonia
10 February
Hard (indoors)

Sweden
2

			1	2	3
1	(Portugal) (Sweden)	Francisca Jorge; Cornelia Lister	2; 6	2; 6
2	(Portugal) (Sweden)	Maria João Koehler; Rebecca Peterson	4; 6	0; 6
3	(Portugal) (Sweden)	Francisca Jorge / Maria João Koehler; Mirjam Björklund / Jacqueline Cabaj Awad				not played

== Final placements ==
Placing	Teams	
Promoted/First	Latvia	Great Britain
Third	Serbia	Hungary
Fifth	Poland	Estonia
Seventh	Bulgaria	Croatia
Ninth	Turkey	Slovenia
Eleventh	Georgia	Sweden
Relegated/Thirteenth	Austria	Portugal

- Great Britain and Latvia were promoted to 2018 Fed Cup World Group II play-offs
- Austria and Portugal were relegated to Europe/Africa Zone Group II in 2019
