= 2019 Fed Cup Europe/Africa Zone Group I – Pool B (Zielona Góra) =

Subsection of tennis competition

Pool A (Zielona Góra) of the 2019 Fed Cup Europe/Africa Zone Group I is one of four pools in the Europe/Africa zone of the 2019 Fed Cup. Four teams competed in a round robin competition, with the top team and the bottom team proceeding to their respective sections of the play-offs: the top team played for advancement to the World Group II Play-offs, while the bottom team faced potential relegation to Group II.

== Standings ==
| | | SWE | UKR | BUL | EST | RR; W–L | Set; W–L | Game; W–L | Standings |
| 12 | Sweden | | 2–1 | 3–0 | 2–1 | 3–0 | 14–6 (70%) | 103–70 (60%) | 1 |
| 3 | Ukraine | 1–2 | | 2–1 | 3–0 | 2–1 | 13–6 (68%) | 95–64 (60%) | 2 |
| 9 | Bulgaria | 0–3 | 1–2 | | 2–1 | 1–2 | 7–12 (37%) | 79–98 (45%) | 3 |
| 7 | Estonia | 1–2 | 0–3 | 1–2 | | 0–3 | 5–15 (25%) | 59–104 (36%) | 4 |

Standings are determined by: 1. number of wins; 2. number of matches; 3. in two-team ties, head-to-head records; 4. in three-team ties, (a) percentage of sets won (head-to-head records if two teams remain tied), then (b) percentage of games won (head-to-head records if two teams remain tied), then (c) Fed Cup rankings.

== Round-robin ==
=== Ukraine vs. Sweden ===
Ukraine
1
Hala Widowiskowo-Sportowa, Zielona Góra, Poland
6 February
Hard (indoor)

Sweden
2

| | | | 1 | 2 | 3 |
|---|---|---|---|---|---|
| 1 | (Ukraine) (Sweden) | Dayana Yastremska; Johanna Larsson | 6; 4 | 6; 2 |
| 2 | (Ukraine) (Sweden) | Lesia Tsurenko; Rebecca Peterson | 0; 6 | 2; 6 |
| 3 | (Ukraine) (Sweden) | Nadiia Kichenok / Marta Kostyuk; Johanna Larsson / Rebecca Peterson | 6; 2 | 3; 6 | 5; 7 |

=== Estonia vs. Bulgaria ===
Estonia
1
Hala Widowiskowo-Sportowa, Zielona Góra, Poland
6 February
Hard (indoor)

Bulgaria
2

| | | | 1 | 2 | 3 |
|---|---|---|---|---|---|
| 1 | (Estonia) (Bulgaria) | Valeria Gorlats; Isabella Shinikova | 6^{6} 7^{8} | 3; 6 |
| 2 | (Estonia) (Bulgaria) | Anett Kontaveit; Viktoriya Tomova | 6; 1 | 6^{4} 7^{7} | 6; 1 |
| 3 | (Estonia) (Bulgaria) | Anett Kontaveit / Maileen Nuudi; Isabella Shinikova / Viktoriya Tomova | 2; 6 | 2; 6 |

=== Ukraine vs. Bulgaria ===
Ukraine
2
Hala Widowiskowo-Sportowa, Zielona Góra, Poland
7 February
Hard (indoor)

Bulgaria
1

| | | | 1 | 2 | 3 |
|---|---|---|---|---|---|
| 1 | (Ukraine) (Bulgaria) | Marta Kostyuk; Isabella Shinikova | 7; 5 | 6; 4 |
| 2 | (Ukraine) (Bulgaria) | Kateryna Kozlova; Viktoriya Tomova | 3; 6 | 2; 6 |
| 3 | (Ukraine) (Bulgaria) | Nadiia Kichenok / Marta Kostyuk; Isabella Shinikova / Viktoriya Tomova | 6; 0 | 7^{7} 6^{0} |

=== Estonia vs. Sweden ===
Estonia
1
Hala Widowiskowo-Sportowa, Zielona Góra, Poland
7 February
Hard (indoor)

Sweden
2

| | | | 1 | 2 | 3 |
|---|---|---|---|---|---|
| 1 | (Estonia) (Sweden) | Elena Malõgina; Johanna Larsson | 2; 6 | 3; 6 |
| 2 | (Estonia) (Sweden) | Anett Kontaveit; Rebecca Peterson | 6; 4 | 6; 4 |
| 3 | (Estonia) (Sweden) | Anett Kontaveit / Saara Orav; Johanna Larsson / Rebecca Peterson | 6; 2 | 0; 6 | 1; 6 |

=== Ukraine vs. Estonia ===
Ukraine
3
Hala Widowiskowo-Sportowa, Zielona Góra, Poland
8 February
Hard (indoor)

Estonia
0

| | | | 1 | 2 | 3 |
|---|---|---|---|---|---|
| 1 | (Ukraine) (Estonia) | Marta Kostyuk; Saara Orav | 6; 3 | 6; 0 |
| 2 | (Ukraine) (Estonia) | Kateryna Kozlova; Elena Malõgina | 6; 0 | 6; 0 |
| 3 | (Ukraine) (Estonia) | Nadiia Kichenok / Kateryna Kozlova; Valeria Gorlats / Elena Malõgina | 6; 1 | 6; 0 |

=== Bulgaria vs. Sweden ===
Bulgaria
0
Hala Widowiskowo-Sportowa, Zielona Góra, Poland
8 February
Hard (indoor)

Sweden
3

| | | | 1 | 2 | 3 |
|---|---|---|---|---|---|
| 1 | (Bulgaria) (Sweden) | Isabella Shinikova; Mirjam Björklund | 3; 6 | 2; 6 |
| 2 | (Bulgaria) (Sweden) | Viktoriya Tomova; Johanna Larsson | 4; 6 | 4; 6 |
| 3 | (Bulgaria) (Sweden) | Petia Arshinkova / Gergana Topalova; Mirjam Björklund / Cornelia Lister | 2; 6 | 3; 6 |
