= 2018 Fed Cup Europe/Africa Zone Group I – Pool B =

Subsection of tennis competition

Pool B of the 2018 Fed Cup Europe/Africa Zone Group I was one of four pools in the Europe/Africa zone of the 2018 Fed Cup. Three teams competed in a round robin competition, with the top team and the bottom team proceeding to their respective sections of the play-offs: the top team played for advancement to the World Group II Play-offs, while the bottom team faced potential relegation to Group II.

== Standings ==
		GBR	EST	POR	RR; W–L	Set; W–L	Game; W–L	Standings
2	Great Britain		3–0	3–0	2–0	12–1 (92%)	78–26 (75%)	1
8	Estonia	0–3		2–1	1–1	5–8 (38%)	48–69 (41%)	2
12	Portugal	0–3	1–2		0–2	2–10 (17%)	36–67 (35%)	3

Standings are determined by: 1. number of wins; 2. number of matches; 3. in two-team ties, head-to-head records; 4. in three-team ties, (a) percentage of sets won (head-to-head records if two teams remain tied), then (b) percentage of games won (head-to-head records if two teams remain tied), then (c) Fed Cup rankings.

== Round-robin ==
=== Great Britain vs. Portugal ===
Great Britain
3
Tallink Tennis Centre, Tallinn, Estonia
7 February
Hard (indoors)

Portugal
0

			1	2	3
1	(United Kingdom) (Portugal)	Heather Watson; Francisca Jorge	6; 4	6; 2
2	(United Kingdom) (Portugal)	Johanna Konta; Maria João Koehler	6; 1	6; 0
3	(United Kingdom) (Portugal)	Katie Boulter / Anna Smith; Francisca Jorge / Maria João Koehler	6; 0	6; 2

=== Estonia vs. Portugal ===
Estonia
2
Tallink Tennis Centre, Tallinn, Estonia
8 February
Hard (indoors)

Portugal
1

			1	2	3
1	(Estonia) (Portugal)	Katriin Saar; Francisca Jorge	2; 6	3; 6
2	(Estonia) (Portugal)	Anett Kontaveit; Inês Murta	6; 2	1; 1		retired
3	(Estonia) (Portugal)	Anett Kontaveit / Saara Orav; Francisca Jorge / Maria João Koehler	7^{7} 6^{0}	7^{8} 6^{6}

=== Great Britain vs. Estonia ===
Great Britain
3
Tallink Tennis Centre, Tallinn, Estonia
9 February
Hard (indoors)

Estonia
0

			1	2	3
1	(United Kingdom) (Estonia)	Heather Watson; Katriin Saar	6; 1	6; 1
2	(United Kingdom) (Estonia)	Johanna Konta; Anett Kontaveit	6^{5} 7^{7}	6; 4	6; 2
3	(United Kingdom) (Estonia)	Katie Boulter / Anna Smith; Elena Malygina / Saara Orav	6; 1	6; 1
