= Kulik (surname) =

Kulik is a Slavic, Jewish and German surname. The Czech-language form, Kulík, is a diminutive of "Mikuláš" ("Nicholas") via "Mikulík". Czech feminine form of the surname: Kulíková. The East Slavic "Kulik" may be derived from the name of the bird кулик, 'snipe'; Ukrainian spelling: Kulyk. In English it has at times been transliterated as "Kulick".

Notable people with the surname include:

- Aleksandr Kulik (born 1981), Estonian professional footballer
- Anita Kulik (born 1964), American politician
- Buzz Kulik (1922–1999), American movie director
- Christian Kulik (born 1952), Polish-born German footballer
- Emilia Kulik (born 1936), Ukrainian actress, wife of director Mikhail Agranovich
- Eran Kulik (born 1946), Israeli football manager
- Grigory Kulik (1890–1950), Marshal of the Soviet Union
- Heather Kulik, American computational materials scientist and chemist
- Ilia Kulik (born 1977), American figure skating coach of Russian origin
- Ivan Kulik (1897–1937; a pen name of Izrail Yudelevych Kulik), Ukrainian poet and Soviet diplomat
- Jakob Philipp Kulik (1793–1863), Austrian mathematician
- Jakub Kulik, Polish policeman and hero who shoot 2026 Kraków shooting perpetrator
- Johann Kulik (1800–1872), Czech luthier
- Leonid Kulik (1883–1942), Estonian mineralogist
- Marina Kulik (born 1956), Dutch painter
- Oleg Kulik (born 1961), Ukrainian-born Russian performance artist
- Witold Kulik (born 1957), former Polish football manager
- Zofia Kulik (born 1947), Polish artist
- Vladislav Kulik (born 1985), Ukrainian footballer

== See also ==
- Kulikov/Kulikova
