= 2018 Fed Cup Europe/Africa Zone Group I – Pool A =

Subsection of tennis competition

Pool A of the 2018 Fed Cup Europe/Africa Zone Group I was one of four pools in the Europe/Africa zone of the 2018 Fed Cup. Three teams competed in a round robin competition, with the top team and the bottom team proceeding to their respective sections of the play-offs: the top team played for advancement to the World Group II Play-offs, while the bottom team faced potential relegation to Group II.

== Standings ==
		SRB	BUL	GEO	RR; W–L	Set; W–L	Game; W–L	Standings
1	Serbia		2–1	2–1	2–0	9–6 (60%)	83–73 (53%)	1
11	Bulgaria	1–2		2–1	1–1	7–6 (54%)	64–63 (50%)	2
7	Georgia	1–2	1–2		0–2	5–9 (36%)	60–71 (46%)	3

Standings are determined by: 1. number of wins; 2. number of matches; 3. in two-team ties, head-to-head records; 4. in three-team ties, (a) percentage of sets won (head-to-head records if two teams remain tied), then (b) percentage of games won (head-to-head records if two teams remain tied), then (c) Fed Cup rankings.

== Round-robin ==
=== Serbia vs. Bulgaria ===
Serbia
2
Tallink Tennis Centre, Tallinn, Estonia
7 February
Hard (indoors)

Bulgaria
1

			1	2	3
1	(Serbia) (Bulgaria)	Olga Danilović; Isabella Shinikova	6; 3	6^{3} 7^{7}	7^{8} 6^{6}
2	(Serbia) (Bulgaria)	Dejana Radanović; Viktoriya Tomova	6; 3	6; 4
3	(Serbia) (Bulgaria)	Olga Danilović / Dejana Radanović; Petia Arshinkova / Julia Terziyska	3; 6	6^{6} 7^{8}

=== Georgia vs. Bulgaria ===
Georgia
1
Tallink Tennis Centre, Tallinn, Estonia
8 February
Hard (indoors)

Bulgaria
2

			1	2	3
1	(Georgia (country)) (Bulgaria)	Sofia Shapatava; Isabella Shinikova	3; 6	3; 6
2	(Georgia (country)) (Bulgaria)	Ekaterine Gorgodze; Viktoriya Tomova	2; 6	3; 6
3	(Georgia (country)) (Bulgaria)	Oksana Kalashnikova / Sofia Shapatava; Petia Arshinkova / Julia Terziyska	6; 0	6; 4

=== Serbia vs. Georgia ===
Serbia
2
Tallink Tennis Centre, Tallinn, Estonia
9 February
Hard (indoors)

Georgia
1

			1	2	3
1	(Serbia) (Georgia (country))	Olga Danilović; Sofia Shapatava	6; 3	6; 0
2	(Serbia) (Georgia (country))	Dejana Radanović; Ekaterine Gorgodze	2; 6	7; 5	6; 4
3	(Serbia) (Georgia (country))	Olga Danilović / Bojana Marinković; Mariam Bolkvadze / Sofia Shapatava	7^{9} 6^{7}	6^{4} 7^{7}	3; 6
