= Kulyk =

Kulyk is a Ukrainian-language surname. Russian equivalent: Kulik

- Ivan Kulyk (bishop), a Ukrainian Greek-Catholic bishop
- Kostyantyn Kulyk (born 1970), Ukrainian professional footballer
- Liliya Kulyk, Ukrainian triple jumper
- Oleh Kulyk, secular name of Patriarch Moses of the Ukrainian Autocephalous Orthodox Church
- Sergiy V. Kulyk (born 1958), Ukrainian diplomat
