= Mikulík =

Mikulík (feminine: Mikulíková) is Czech-language surname derived from a given name, a diminutive of "Mikuláš" ("Nicholas"). Notable people with this surname include:

- Joe Mikulik (born 1963), American baseball player and manager
- Milan Mikulík (born 1980), Czech ice hockey player
