= Petia Arshinkova =

Bulgarian tennis player (born 1998)

- Native name: Петя Аршинкова
- Country (sports): Bulgaria
- Born: 26 April 1998 (age 26); Plovdiv, Bulgaria
- Retired: July 2021
- Plays: Right (two-handed backhand)
- Prize money: $44,634

Singles
- Career record: 159–148
- Career titles: 1 ITF
- Highest ranking: No. 476 (29 July 2019)

Doubles
- Career record: 76–80
- Career titles: 3 ITF
- Highest ranking: No. 540 (10 August 2020)

Team competitions
- Fed Cup: 1–4 (doubles 1–3)

Petia Arshinkova (Bulgarian: Петя Аршинкова; born 26 April 1998) is a former professional Bulgarian tennis player.

Arshinkova has a career-high singles ranking of No. 476 by the WTA, achieved on 29 July 2019. She has won one singles title and three doubles titles on the ITF Women's Circuit.

Arshinkova made her Fed Cup debut for Bulgaria in 2018.

== ITF Circuit finals ==
=== Singles: 1 (title) ===
Legend $25,000 tournaments $15,000 tournaments	Finals by surface Hard (1–0) Clay (0–0)

Result	W–L	Date	Tournament	Tier	Surface	Opponent	Score
Win	1–0	Oct 2019	ITF Sozopol, Bulgaria	15,000	Hard	(Finland) Oona Orpana	6–0, 6–4

=== Doubles: 9 (3 titles, 6 runner–ups) ===
Legend $25,000 tournaments $15,000 tournaments $10,000 tournaments	Finals by surface Hard (1–2) Clay (2–4) Carpet (0–0)

Result	W–L	Date	Tournament	Tier	Surface	Partner	Opponents	Score
Win	1–0	Feb 2016	ITF Antalya, Turkey	10,000	Clay	(Romania) Elena-Gabriela Ruse	(Greece) Eleni Daniilidou (Uzbekistan) Arina Folts	7–6^{(0)}, 6–4
Win	2–0	Sep 2016	ITF Sozopol, Bulgaria	10,000	Hard	(Serbia) Dejana Radanović	(Czech Republic) Kateřina Kramperová (Russia) Angelina Zhuravleva	6–1, 6–3
Loss	2–1	Jul 2017	ITF Istanbul, Turkey	15,000	Clay	(Turkey) İpek Öz	(Georgia (country)) Ekaterine Gorgodze (Georgia (country)) Mariam Bolkvadze	1–6, 3–6
Loss	2–2	Apr 2018	ITF Antalya, Turkey	15,000	Clay	(Bulgaria) Gebriela Mihaylova	(Germany) Lisa-Marie Mätschke (Germany) Syna Schreiber	3–6, 1–6
Win	3–2	May 2018	ITF Cairo, Egypt	15,000	Clay	(Bulgaria) Gergana Topalova	(India) Riya Bhatia (United States) Shelby Talcott	4–6, 6–3, [10–4]
Loss	3–3	Nov 2019	ITF Gwalior, India	25,000	Clay	(Bulgaria) Gergana Topalova	(Japan) Mana Kawamura (Japan) Funa Kozaki	4–6, 1–6
Loss	3–4	Feb 2020	ITF Monastir, Tunisia	15,000	Hard	(Bulgaria) Gergana Topalova	(France) Julie Belgraver (France) Mylène Halemai	6–2, 1–6, [4–10]
Loss	3–5	Mar 2020	ITF Monastir, Tunisia	15,000	Hard	(Bulgaria) Gergana Topalova	(France) Mylène Halemai (Romania) Andreea Prisăcariu	3–6, 4–6
Loss	3–6	Feb 2021	ITF Antalya, Turkey	15,000	Clay	(Bulgaria) Gergana Topalova	(Colombia) María Herazo González (Colombia) Yuliana Lizarazo	2–6, 1–6

== Fed Cup ==
Arshinkova debuted for the Bulgaria Fed Cup team in 2018. Since then, she has a 0–1 singles record and a 1–3 doubles record (1–4 overall).

=== Singles (0–1) ===
Edition	Round	Date	Location	Against	Surface	Opponent	W/L	Result
2018	Z1 PO	10 Feb 2018	Tallinn (EST)	Poland	Hard (i)	Iga Świątek	L	0–6, 4–6

=== Doubles (1–3) ===
Edition	Round	Date	Location	Against	Partner	Surface	Opponents	W/L	Result
2018	Z1 RR	7 Feb 2018	Tallinn (EST)	Julia Terziyska	Hard (i)	Serbia	Olga Danilović; Dejana Radanović	W	6–3, 7–6^{(8–6)}
2018	Z1 RR	8 Feb 2018	Tallinn (EST)	Julia Terziyska	Hard (i)	Georgia	Oksana Kalashnikova; Sofia Shapatava	L	0–6, 4–6
2019	Z1 RR	8 Feb 2019	Zielona Góra (POL)	Gergana Topalova	Hard (i)	Sweden	Mirjam Björklund; Cornelia Lister	L	2–6, 3–6
2020-21	Z1 RR	8 Feb 2019	Tallinn (EST)	Gergana Topalova	Hard (i)	Ukraine	Lesia Tsurenko; Katarina Zavatska	L	2–6, 1–6
