= Kulikovo, Arkhangelsk Oblast =

Kulikovo Куликово
- Settlement
- Location within Arkhangelsk Oblast Location within Russia
- Coordinates: 61°42′N 46°40′E
- Country: Russia
- Region: Arkhangelsk Oblast
- District: Krasnoborsky District
- Time zone: UTC+3:00

Kulikovo (Russian: Куликово) is a rural locality (a settlement) and the administrative center of Kulikovskoye Rural Settlement of Krasnoborsky District, Arkhangelsk Oblast, Russia. The population was 679 as of 2010. There are 14 streets.

== Geography ==
Kulikovo is located on the Uftyuga River, 58 km northeast of Krasnoborsk (the district's administrative centre) by road. Omutinskaya is the nearest rural locality.
