= Kulikov, Volgograd Oblast =

Kulikov Куликов
- Settlement
- Location within Volgograd Oblast Location within Russia
- Coordinates: 50°06′N 47°18′E
- Country: Russia
- Region: Volgograd Oblast
- District: Pallasovsky District
- Time zone: UTC+4:00

Kulikov (Russian: Куликов) is a rural locality (a settlement) in Savinskoye Rural Settlement, Pallasovsky District, Volgograd Oblast, Russia. The population was 84 as of 2010. There are 3 streets.

== Geography ==
Kulikov is located in steppe, 34 km east of Pallasovka (the district's administrative centre) by road. Borsy is the nearest rural locality.
