= Kulikovo, Dobryansky District =

Kulikovo Куликово
- Village
- Location within Perm Krai Location within Russia
- Coordinates: 58°48′N 56°47′E
- Country: Russia
- Region: Perm Krai
- District: Dobryansky District
- Time zone: UTC+5:00

Kulikovo (Russian: Куликово) is a rural locality (a village) in Dobryansky District, Perm Krai, Russia. The population was 8 as of 2010.
