= Saara Orav =

Estonian tennis player

- Country (sports): Estonia
- Born: 30 December 2001 (age 23); Viljandi, Estonia
- Plays: Right (two-handed backhand)
- College: Rice (2021– )
- Prize money: $2,271

Singles
- Career record: 6–7

Doubles
- Career record: 10–6
- Career titles: 1 ITF
- Highest ranking: No. 942 (24 September 2018)

Team competitions
- Fed Cup: 3–4
- Last updated on: 10 March 2024.

Saara Orav (born 30 December 2001) is an inactive Estonian tennis player.

She currently attends Rice University. She is at Baker college pursuing a B.S. degree of mechanical engineering.

Playing for Estonia Fed Cup team, Orav has a win–loss record of 3–4.

She has been playing only two matches (first-round losses) on the ITF Circuit since February 2020.

== ITF Circuit finals ==
=== Doubles: 3 (1 title, 2 runner-ups) ===
Legend $60,000 tournaments $25,000 tournaments $15,000 tournaments	Finals by surface Hard (0–0) Clay (1–2)

Result	No.	Date	Tournament	Surface	Partner	Opponents	Score
Loss	1.	Apr 2018	ITF Tučepi, Croatia	Clay	(Croatia) Tena Lukas	(Bosnia and Herzegovina) Nefisa Berberović (Slovenia) Veronika Erjavec	3–6, 3–6
Win	1.	Jul 2018	ITF Pärnu, Estonia	Clay	(Estonia) Katriin Saar	(Russia) Adelina Baravi (Russia) Elina Vikhrianova	6–4, 6–2
Loss	2.	Jul 2019	ITF Pärnu, Estonia	Clay	(Estonia) Katriin Saar	(Finland) Anastasia Kulikova (Estonia) Elena Malõgina	3–6, 6–2, [5–10]

== Fed Cup participation ==
Orav made her Fed Cup debut for Estonia in 2018, while the team was competing in the Europe/Africa Zone Group I.

Group membership World Group World Group play-off World Group II World Group II play-off Europe/Africa Group (3–3)	Matches by surface Hard (3–4) Clay (0–0) Grass (0–0) Carpet (0–0)	Matches by type Singles (1–1) Doubles (2–3)	Matches by setting Indoors (3–4) Outdoors (0–0)

=== Singles (1–1) ===
Edition	Stage	Date	Location	Against	Surface	Opponent	W/L	Score
2018 Fed Cup; Europe/Africa Zone Group I	Play-offs	10 February 2018	Tallinn, Estonia	Croatia	Hard (i)	Ana Biškić	W	3–6, 6–4, 6–2
2019 Fed Cup; Europe/Africa Zone Group I	Pool B	8 February 2019	Zielona Góra, Poland	Ukraine	Hard (i)	Marta Kostyuk	L	3–6, 0–6

=== Doubles (2–3) ===
Edition	Stage	Date	Location	Against	Surface	Partner	Opponents	W/L	Score
2018 Fed Cup; Europe/Africa Zone Group I	Pool B	8 February 2018	Tallinn, Estonia	Portugal	Hard (i)	Anett Kontaveit	Francisca Jorge; Maria João Koehler	W	7–6^{(7–0)}, 7–6^{(8–6)}
2018 Fed Cup; Europe/Africa Zone Group I	Pool B	9 February 2018	Tallinn, Estonia	(United Kingdom) Great Britain	Hard (i)	Elena Malõgina	Katie Boulter; Anna Smith	L	1–6, 1–6
2018 Fed Cup; Europe/Africa Zone Group I	Play-offs	10 February 2018	Tallinn, Estonia	Croatia	Hard (i)	Elena Malõgina	Ana Biškić; Tena Lukas	W	6–2, 4–6, 7–5
2019 Fed Cup; Europe/Africa Zone Group I	Pool B	7 February 2019	Zielona Góra, Poland	Sweden	Hard (i)	Anett Kontaveit	Johanna Larsson; Rebecca Peterson	L	6–2, 0–6, 1–6
2020 Fed Cup; Europe/Africa Zone Group I	Pool B	7 February 2020	Tallinn, Estonia	Austria	Hard (i)	Valeria Gorlats	Melanie Klaffner; Sinja Kraus	L	2–6, 6–4, 0–6

== Junior career ==
Orav has a career-high ITF juniors ranking of 248, achieved on 28 October 2019.

=== ITF junior finals ===
Category G1
Category G2
Category G3
Category G4
Category G5

==== Singles (2–2) ====
Outcome	No.	Date	Tournament	Grade	Surface	Opponent	Score
Runner-up	1.	6 May 2018	Skopje, Macedonia	G5	Clay	(Bulgaria) Dariya Radulova	1–6, 1–6
Winner	1.	13 May 2018	Skopje, Macedonia	G5	Clay	(Belgium) Emeline De Witte	6–2, 6–4
Runner-up	2.	1 July 2018	Aarhus, Denmark	G5	Clay	(Spain) Cristina Mayorova Bakhtina	6–4, 3–6, 2–6
Winner	2.	7 July 2019	Bruchköbel, Germany	G4	Clay	(Germany) Nicole Rivkin	6–0, 6–3

==== Doubles (3–2) ====
Outcome	No.	Date	Tournament	Grade	Surface	Partner	Opponents	Score
Runner-up	1.	26 August 2017	Riga, Latvia	G4	Clay	(Estonia) Katriin Saar	(Belarus) Viktoryia Kanapatskaya (Ukraine) Diana Khodan	0–6, 7–5, [8–10]
Winner	1.	6 May 2018	Skopje, Macedonia	G5	Clay	(Switzerland) Julie Sappl	(Slovenia) Pia Lovrič (Croatia) Laura Mašić	w/o
Winner	2.	8 July 2018	Bruchköbel, Germany	G4	Clay	(Australia) Tayla Whitehouse	(Switzerland) Nina Geissler (Switzerland) Lea Magun	6–0, 6–0
Runner-up	2.	23 November 2018	Santa Cruz, Bolivia	G3	Clay	(United States) Tara Malik	(Finland) Alexandra Anttila (Slovenia) Metka Komac	1–6, 6–4, [8–10]
Winner	3.	7 July 2019	Bruchköbel, Germany	G4	Clay	(Australia) Charlotte Kempenaers-Pocz	(Belgium) Amelie Van Impe (Belgium) Hanne van de Winkel	6–4, 6–3
