= Katriin Saar =

Estonian tennis player

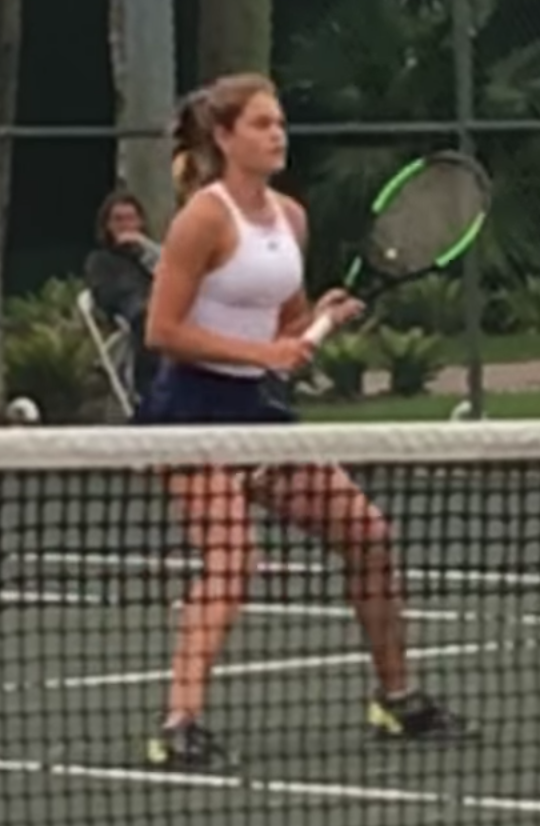
- Katriin Saar at the 2017 Orange Bowl
- Country (sports): Estonia
- Born: 11 March 2002 (age 24)
- Plays: Right-handed (two-handed backhand)
- Prize money: $11,667

Singles
- Career record: 27–17
- Career titles: 0
- Highest ranking: 941 (3 February 2020)
- Current ranking: 1136 (6 March 2023)

Doubles
- Career record: 8–4
- Career titles: 2 ITF
- Highest ranking: 710 (20 February 2023)
- Current ranking: 713 (6 March 2023)

Team competitions
- Fed Cup: 0–9
- Last updated on: 6 March 2023.

Katriin Saar (born 11 March 2002) is an Estonian tennis player.

She won the Under-16 girls' singles title at the 2017 Orange Bowl.

Saar made her Fed Cup debut for Estonia in 2018.

== ITF Circuit finals ==
=== Doubles: 3 (2–1) ===
Legend $100,000 tournaments $80,000 tournaments $60,000 tournaments $25,000 tournaments $15,000 tournaments	Finals by surface Hard (0–0) Clay (2–1) Grass (0–0) Carpet (0–0)

Result	W–L	Date	Tournament	Tier	Surface	Partner	Opponents	Score
Win	1–0	Jul 2018	ITF Pärnu, Estonia	15,000	Clay	(Estonia) Saara Orav	(Russia) Adelina Baravi (Russia) Elina Vikhrianova	6–4, 6–2
Loss	1–1	Jul 2019	ITF Pärnu, Estonia	15,000	Clay	(Estonia) Saara Orav	(Finland) Anastasia Kulikova (Estonia) Elena Malõgina	3–6, 6–2, [5–10]
Win	2–1	Aug 2022	ITF Savitaipale, Finland	15,000	Clay	(Estonia) Anet Angelika Koskel	(Italy) Miriana Tona (Bulgaria) Ani Vangelova	5–7, 6–3, [10–2]

== Junior career ==
Saar has a career-high ITF juniors ranking of 186, which she achieved on 21 May 2018.

=== ITF Junior finals ===
Grand Slam
Category GA
Category G1
Category G2
Category G3
Category G4
Category G5

==== Singles (5–2) ====
Outcome	No.	Date	Tournament	Grade	Surface	Opponent	Score
Runner-up	1.	10 September 2016	Liepāja, Latvia	G5	Clay	(Finland) Anastasia Kulikova	1–6, 1–6
Runner-up	2.	27 May 2017	Tallinn, Estonia	G4	Clay	(Belarus) Viktoryia Kanapatskaya	1–6, 7–5, 4–6
Winner	1.	5 August 2017	Nastola, Finland	G5	Clay	(Estonia) Sofiya Chekhlystova	6–3, 6–0
Winner	2.	21 January 2018	Warsaw, Poland	G5	Hard (i)	(Russia) Daria Repina	4–6, 6–2, 6–3
Winner	3.	3 March 2018	Tartu, Estonia	G5	Carpet (i)	(Estonia) Lissi Kubre	6–3, 1–6, 6–0
Winner	4.	24 March 2018	Doha, Qatar	G4	Hard	(China) Yang Mingqiao	6–4, 6–7^{(1–7)}, 6–3
Winner	5.	31 March 2018	Doha, Qatar	G4	Hard	(Italy) Matilde Mariani	6–1, 5–7, 6–1

==== Doubles (2–2) ====
Outcome	No.	Date	Tournament	Grade	Surface	Partner	Opponents	Score
Winner	1.	3 September 2016	Šiauliai, Lithuania	G5	Clay	(Estonia) Sofiya Chekhlystova	(Lithuania) Iveta Daujotaitė (Latvia) Rebeka Mertena	6–0, 3–6, [10–8]
Winner	2.	5 November 2016	Tampere, Finland	G4	Hard (i)	(Estonia) Sofiya Chekhlystova	(Russia) Maria Krupenina (Russia) Anastasia Tikhonova	6–2, 7–6^{(10–8)}
Runner-up	1.	25 June 2017	Odense, Denmark	G4	Clay	(Finland) Ella Haavisto	(Argentina) Jazmín Ortenzi (Colombia) Jessica Plazas	6–4, 4–6, [8–10]
Runner-up	2.	26 August 2017	Riga, Latvia	G4	Clay	(Estonia) Saara Orav	(Belarus) Viktoryia Kanapatskaya (Ukraine) Diana Khodan	0–6, 7–5, [8–10]

== National representation ==
=== Fed Cup ===
Saar made her Fed Cup debut for Estonia in 2018, while the team was competing in the Europe/Africa Zone Group I, when she was 15 years and 334 days old.

==== Fed Cup (0–4) ====
Group membership World Group (0–0) World Group Play-off (0–0) World Group II (0–0) World Group II Play-off (0–0) Americas Group (0–4)	Matches by surface Hard (0–4) Clay (0–0) Grass (0–0) Carpet (0–0)	Matches by type Singles (0–3) Doubles (0–1)	Matches by setting Indoors (0–4) Outdoors (0–0)

===== Singles (0–3) =====
Edition	Stage	Date	Location	Against	Surface	Opponent	W/L	Score
2018 Fed Cup; Europe/Africa Zone Group I	Pool B	8 February 2018	Tallinn, Estonia	Portugal	Hard (i)	Francisca Jorge	L	2–6, 3–6
2018 Fed Cup; Europe/Africa Zone Group I	Pool B	9 February 2018	Tallinn, Estonia	(United Kingdom) Great Britain	Hard (i)	Heather Watson	L	1–6, 1–6
2018 Fed Cup; Europe/Africa Zone Group I	Pool B	10 February 2018	Tallinn, Estonia	Croatia	Hard (i)	Tena Lukas	L	6–2, 5–7, 1–6

===== Doubles (0–1) =====
Edition	Stage	Date	Location	Against	Surface	Partner	Opponents	W/L	Score
2020 Fed Cup; Europe/Africa Zone Group I	Pool B	6 February 2020	Tallinn, Estonia	Italy	Hard (i)	Valeria Gorlats	Jasmine Paolini; Martina Trevisan	L	3–6, 2–6

Preceded by (United States) Katie Volynets	Orange Bowl U16 Girls Champion; 2017	Succeeded by (United States) Madison Sieg
