= Anastasia Kulikova =

Finnish-Russian tennis player

Anastasia Kulikova Анастасия Куликова
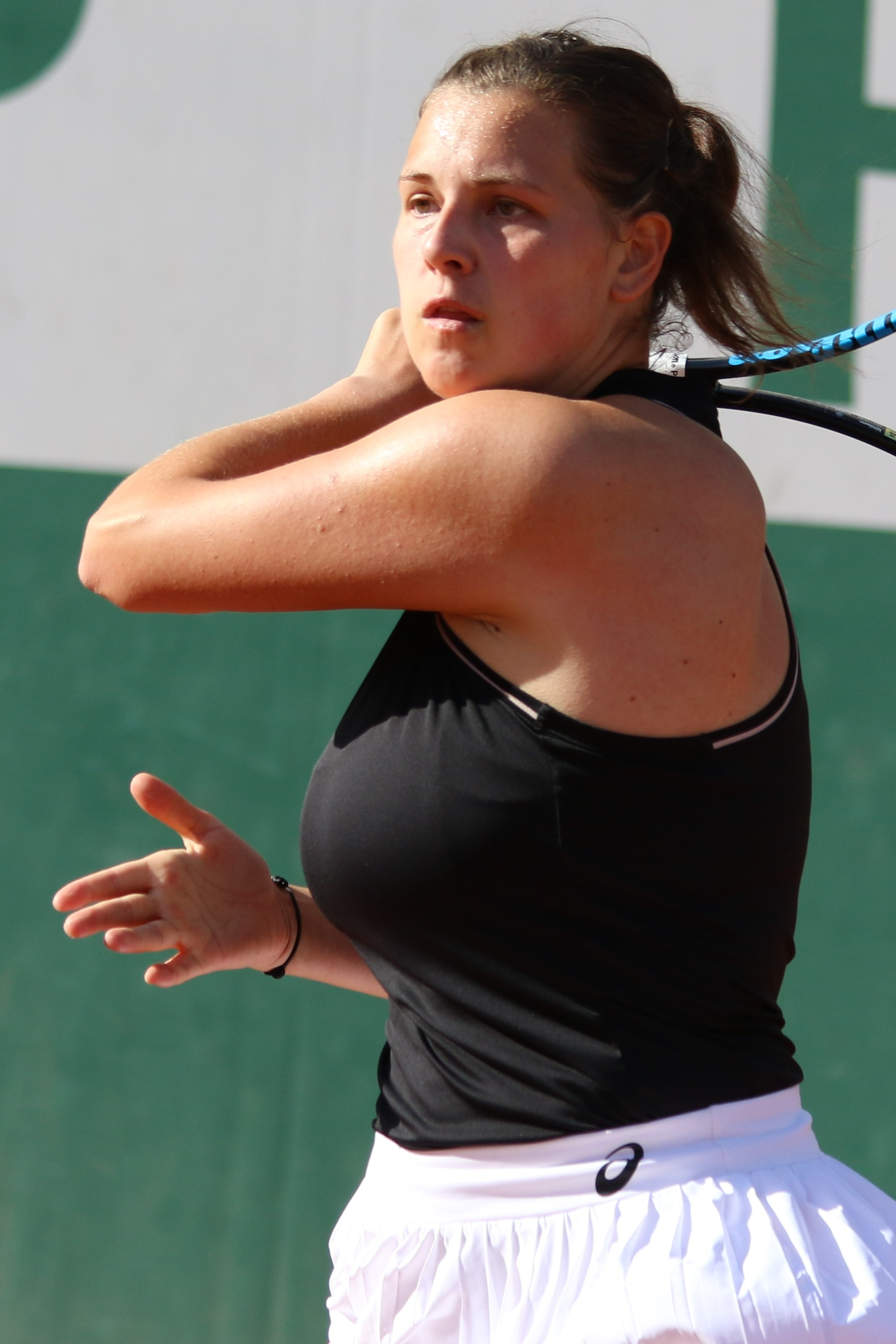
- Kulikova at the 2022 French Open
- Full name: Anastasia Andreyevna Kulikova
- Country (sports): Russia (2014–18); Finland (2018–)
- Born: 15 February 2000 (age 26) Ryazan, Russia
- Height: 1.77 m (5 ft 10 in)
- Plays: Left (two-handed backhand)
- Prize money: $251,736

Singles
- Career record: 302–171
- Career titles: 10 ITF
- Highest ranking: No. 179 (13 June 2022)
- Current ranking: No. 308 (28 September 2026)

Grand Slam singles results
- French Open: Q3 (2022)
- Wimbledon: Q1 (2022)
- US Open: Q1 (2022)

Doubles
- Career record: 49–41
- Career titles: 2 ITF
- Highest ranking: No. 581 (9 August 2021)
- Current ranking: No. 658 (28 September 2026)

Team competitions
- Fed Cup: 14–4
- Last updated on: 2 October 2026.

Anastasia Andreyevna Kulikova (Russian: Анастасия Андреевна Куликова; born 15 February 2000) is a Russian-born Finnish tennis player.

Kulikova has a career-high singles ranking by the WTA of 179, achieved on 13 June 2022. She also has a career-high WTA doubles ranking of 581, reached on 9 August 2021. Kulikova has won ten singles and two doubles titles on the ITF Women's Circuit.

On the ITF Junior Circuit, she had a career-high combined ranking of 69, achieved on 8 January 2018.

== Career overview ==
Kulikova made her Fed Cup debut for Finland in 2019.

At the 2022 French Open, she upset top qualifying seed Anastasia Potapova in the second round but failed to qualify into the main draw falling to Ysaline Bonaventure in the third round.

== ITF Circuit finals ==
=== Singles: 21 (10 titles, 11 runner-ups) ===
Legend W75 tournaments W25/35 tournaments W15 tournaments	Finals by surface Hard (8–10) Clay (2–0) Carpet (0–1)

Result	W–L	Date	Tournament	Tier	Surface	Opponent	Score
Win	1–0	Oct 2018	ITF Stockholm, Sweden	W15	Hard (i)	(United Kingdom) Tiffany William	7–5, 6–3
Win	2–0	Oct 2018	ITF Stockholm, Sweden	W15	Hard (i)	(Sweden) Jacqueline Cabaj Awad	6–7^{(5)}, 6–2, 6–4
Loss	2–1	Jan 2019	ITF Stuttgart, Germany	W15	Hard (i)	(Romania) Laura Ioana Paar	3–6, 1–6
Win	3–1	Jul 2019	Tampere Open, Finland	W15	Hard (i)	(Belgium) Victoria Kalaitzis	6–4, 6–7^{(2)}, 6–3
Win	4–1	Jul 2019	ITF Savitaipale, Finland	W15	Clay	(Russia) Ekaterina Kazionova	4–6, 7–6^{(3)} 6–2
Win	5–1	Nov 2019	ITF Stockholm, Sweden	W15	Hard (i)	(Estonia) Elena Malõgina	7–5, 6–3
Loss	5–2	Dec 2019	ITF Milovice, Czech Republic	W15	Hard (i)	(Estonia) Kaia Kanepi	4–6, 3–6
Win	6–2	Dec 2019	ITF Monastir, Tunisia	W15	Hard	(Japan) Yuriko Miyazaki	7–6^{(6)}, 6–4
Win	7–2	Mar 2021	ITF Monastir, Tunisia	W15	Hard	(Netherlands) Suzan Lamens	6–4, 2–6, 6–3
Loss	7–3	Mar 2021	ITF Monastir, Tunisia	W15	Hard	(Italy) Angelica Raggi	6–7^{(4)}, 4–6
Loss	7–4	May 2021	ITF Monastir, Tunisia	W15	Hard	(Belarus) Anna Kubareva	1–6, 3–6
Loss	7–5	Sep 2021	ITF Leiria, Portugal	W25	Hard	(France) Jessika Ponchet	6–7^{(3)}, 0–6
Loss	7–6	Dec 2021	ITF Jablonec nad Nisou, Czech Republic	W25	Carpet (i)	(United Kingdom) Sarah Beth Grey	2–6, 2–6
Win	8–6	May 2022	ITF Split, Croatia	W25	Clay	(Japan) Yuki Naito	7–6^{(4)}, 6–1
Loss	8–7	Dec 2022	ITF Solapur, India	W25	Hard	(Indonesia) Priska Madelyn Nugroho	4–6, 2–6
Win	9–7	Oct 2023	ITF Istanbul, Turkey	W25	Hard (i)	(Poland) Martyna Kubka	6–4, 3–6, 6–1
Loss	9–8	Apr 2024	ITF Monastir, Tunisia	W15	Hard	(United States) Hina Inoue	2–6, 2–3 ret.
Loss	9–9	Sep 2024	ITF Leiria, Portugal	W35	Hard	(Portugal) Matilde Jorge	6–1, 2–6, 1–6
Loss	9–10	Feb 2025	ITF Bucharest, Romania	W15	Hard (i)	(Netherlands) Anouck Vrancken Peeters	4–6, 6–1, 3–6
Loss	9–11	Feb 2025	ITF Leimen, Germany	W15	Hard (i)	(Poland) Martyna Kubka	4–6, 6–7^{(5)}
Win	10–11	Aug 2026	Lexington Open, United States	W75	Hard	(United States) Ayana Akli	7–5, 6–4

=== Doubles: 8 (2 titles, 6 runner-ups) ===
Legend W25 tournaments W15 tournaments	Finals by surface Hard (1–5) Clay (1–1)

Result	W–L	Date	Tournament	Tier	Surface	Partner	Opponents	Score
Win	1–0	Oct 2017	ITF Stockholm, Sweden	W15	Hard (i)	(Estonia) Elena Malõgina	(Norway) Malene Helgø (Sweden) Fanny Östlund	6–2, 7–5
Loss	1–1	Nov 2017	ITF Helsinki, Finland	W15	Hard (i)	(Estonia) Elena Malõgina	(Switzerland) Naïma Karamoko (Switzerland) Tess Sugnaux	5–7, 2–6
Loss	1–2	Oct 2018	ITF Stockholm, Sweden	W15	Hard (i)	(Estonia) Elena Malõgina	(Sweden) Alexandra Viktorovitch (Sweden) Lisa Zaar	5–7, 5–7
Win	2–2	Jul 2019	ITF Pärnu, Estonia	W15	Clay	(Estonia) Elena Malõgina	(Estonia) Saara Orav (Estonia) Katriin Saar	3–6, 6–2, [5–10]
Loss	2–3	Jul 2019	Tampere Open, Finland	W15	Hard (i)	(Australia) Isabella Bozicevic	(Russia) Polina Bakhmutkina (Russia) Noel Saidenova	2–6, 3–6
Loss	2–4	Sep 2019	Royal Cup, Montenegro	W25	Clay	(Russia) Evgeniya Levashova	(Russia) Amina Anshba (Czech Republic) Anastasia Dețiuc	6–2, 3–6, [7–10]
Loss	2–5	Nov 2020	ITF Ortisei, Italy	W15	Hard (i)	(Italy) Federica di Sarra	(Netherlands) Suzan Lamens (Belgium) Kimberley Zimmermann	6–3, 4–6, [9–11]
Loss	2–6	Mar 2021	ITF Monastir, Tunisia	W15	Hard	(France) Yasmine Mansouri	(Netherlands) Isabelle Haverlag (Russia) Anastasia Pribylova	3–6, 1–6
