= Elena Malygina =

Estonian tennis player (born 2000)

- Country (sports): Estonia
- Born: 27 May 2000 (age 26) Saint Petersburg, Russia
- Plays: Right (two-handed backhand)
- Prize money: $147,091

Singles
- Career record: 281–187
- Career titles: 4 ITF
- Highest ranking: No. 294 (13 April 2026)
- Current ranking: No. 312 (22 June 2026)

Doubles
- Career record: 169–134
- Career titles: 13 ITF
- Highest ranking: No. 236 (7 November 2022)
- Current ranking: No. 252 (22 June 2026)

Team competitions
- Fed Cup: 9–16
- Last updated on: 26 June 2026.

Elena Malygina (born 27 May 2000) is an Estonian tennis player. She has a career-high doubles ranking of world No. 236, achieved on 7 November 2022, while her career-high WTA singles ranking is No. 294, achieved on 13 April 2026.

Malygina has won 13 ITF doubles titles and four in singles.

She made her debut for the Estonia Fed Cup team in 2018, and has achieved a win–loss record of 9–16 in Fed Cup competition, as of July 2024.

== Career ==
Malygina made her debut on the professional tour in 2016.

She made her WTA Tour debut as a wildcard entrant at the 2022 Tallinn Open, losing to second seed Belinda Bencic in the first round.

She received a qualifying wildcard for the WTA 500 2025 Strasbourg International tournament but lost in the first round to Anna Blinkova.

== Personal life ==
She was born in Saint Petersburg, Russia to an Estonian father and a Russian mother.

== ITF Circuit finals ==
=== Singles: 11 (4 titles, 7 runner-ups) ===
Legend W50 tournaments W25/35 tournaments W15 tournaments	Finals by surface Hard (2–3) Clay (1–4) Carpet (1–0)

Result	W–L	Date	Tournament	Tier	Surface	Opponent	Score
Loss	0–1	May 2019	ITF Heraklion, Greece	W15	Clay	(Serbia) Tamara Malešević	3–6, 6–7^{(3)}
Loss	0–2	Jul 2019	ITF Pärnu, Estonia	W15	Clay	(Netherlands) Suzan Lamens	4–6, 0–6
Loss	0–3	Nov 2019	ITF Stockholm, Sweden	W15	Hard (i)	(Finland) Anastasia Kulikova	5–7, 3–6
Win	1–3	Nov 2019	ITF Pärnu, Estonia	W15	Hard (i)	(Russia) Ekaterina Kazionova	6–4, 1–6, 7–5
Win	2–3	Dec 2019	ITF Jablonec nad Nisou, Czech Republic	W15	Carpet (i)	(Czech Republic) Miriam Kolodziejová	6–4, 7–5
Win	3–3	Jul 2021	ITF Savitaipale, Finland	W15	Clay	(Germany) Emily Seibold	4–6, 7–6, 6–2
Loss	3–4	Nov 2023	ITF Sunderland, UK	W25	Hard (i)	(Switzerland) Valentina Ryser	4–6, 5–7
Loss	3–5	May 2024	ITF Varberg, Sweden	W15	Clay	(Sweden) Caijsa Hennemann	0–6, 1–6
Loss	3–6	May 2025	ITF Kalmar, Sweden	W15	Clay	(Germany) Tessa Johanna Brockmann	6–2, 6–7^{(8)}, 6–7^{(4)}
Loss	3–7	Sep 2025	ITF Kayseri, Turkiye	W15	Clay	(United States) Julia Adams	6–3, 6–7^{(2)}, 5–7
Win	4–7	Jan 2026	ITF Birmingham, UK	W35	Hard (i)	(Germany) Noma Noha Akugue	6–4, 6–4

=== Doubles: 26 (13 titles, 13 runner-ups) ===
Legend W100 tournaments W75 tournaments W50 tournaments W25/35 tournaments W15 tournaments	Finals by surface Hard (9–10) Clay (4–2) Carpet (0–1)

Result	W–L	Date	Tournament	Tier	Surface	Partner	Opponents	Score
Win	1–0	Oct 2017	ITF Stockholm, Sweden	W15	Hard (i)	(Finland) Anastasia Kulikova	(Norway) Malene Helgø (Sweden) Fanny Östlund	6–2, 7–5
Loss	1–1	Nov 2017	ITF Helsinki, Finland	W15	Hard (i)	(Finland) Anastasia Kulikova	(Switzerland) Naïma Karamoko (Switzerland) Tess Sugnaux	5–7, 2–6
Loss	1–2	Jul 2018	Tampere Open, Finland	W15	Clay	(Russia) Polina Bakhmutkina	(Paraguay) Camila Giangreco Campiz (Serbia) Bojana Marinković	6–1, 4–6, [7–10]
Win	2–2	Aug 2018	ITF Savitaipale, Finland	W15	Clay	(Russia) Polina Bakhmutkina	(Norway) Astrid Wanja Brune Olsen (Norway) Malene Helgø	6–4, 1–6, [10–5]
Loss	2–3	Oct 2018	ITF Stockholm, Sweden	W15	Hard (i)	(Finland) Anastasia Kulikova	(Sweden) Alexandra Viktorovitch (Sweden) Lisa Zaar	5–7, 5–7
Loss	2–4	Feb 2019	ITF Shymkent, Kazakhstan	W15	Hard	(Serbia) Tamara Čurović	(Russia) Ekaterina Kazionova (Russia) Anastasia Zakharova	6–7^{(4)}, 1–6
Loss	2–5	Apr 2019	ITF Antalya, Turkey	W15	Clay	(South Korea) Park So-hyun	(Czech Republic) Johana Marková (Slovenia) Nika Radišić	0–6, 0–6
Win	3–5	Jul 2019	ITF Pärnu, Estonia	W15	Clay	(Finland) Anastasia Kulikova	(Estonia) Saara Orav (Estonia) Katriin Saar	6–3, 2–6, [10–5]
Loss	3–6	Dec 2019	ITF Jablonec nad Nisou, Czech Republic	W15	Carpet (i)	(Japan) Ange Oby Kajuru	(Slovakia) Jana Jablonovská (Czech Republic) Nikola Tomanová	6–7^{(4)}, 7–5, [4–10]
Win	4–6	Mar 2021	ITF Bratislava, Slovakia	W15	Hard (i)	(France) Alice Robbe	(Slovenia) Nina Potočnik (Croatia) Iva Primorac	7–6^{(2)}, 6–2
Win	5–6	Mar 2021	ITF Bratislava, Slovakia	W15	Hard (i)	(France) Alice Robbe	(Czech Republic) Tereza Smitková (Czech Republic) Veronika Vlkovská	3–6, 6–3, [10–5]
Loss	5–7	Oct 2021	ITF Karaganda, Kazakhstan	W25	Hard (i)	(Serbia) Tamara Čurović	(Poland) Martyna Kubka (Kazakhstan) Zhibek Kulambayeva	5–7, 4–6
Win	6–7	Jan 2022	GB Pro-Series Bath, UK	W25	Hard (i)	(Sweden) Caijsa Hennemann	(Romania) Arina Vasilescu (United Kingdom) Emily Webley-Smith	6–4, 6–3
Win	7–7	Jul 2022	ITF Darmstadt, Germany	W25	Clay	(France) Alice Robbe	(Spain) Jéssica Bouzas Maneiro (Spain) Leyre Romero Gormaz	7–5, 7–5
Win	8–7	Oct 2022	ITF Sozopol, Bulgaria	W25	Hard	Irina Khromacheva	(Romania) Ilona Georgiana Ghioroaie (Hungary) Rebeka Stolmár	7–6, 6–2
Loss	8–8	Oct 2022	ITF Sozopol, Bulgaria	W25	Hard	(Netherlands) Jasmijn Gimbrère	Darya Astakhova; Irina Khromacheva	w/o
Loss	8–9	Oct 2022	GB Pro-Series Loughborough, UK	W25	Hard (i)	(Poland) Martyna Kubka	(Chinese Taipei) Joanna Garland (Czech Republic) Gabriela Knutson	3–6, 3–6
Loss	8–10	May 2023	ITF Nottingham, UK	W25	Hard	(China) Lu Jiajing	(United Kingdom) Naiktha Bains (United Kingdom) Maia Lumsden	6–4, 4–6, [6–10]
Loss	8–11	Oct 2023	GB Pro-Series Shrewsbury, UK	W100	Hard (i)	(Czech Republic) Barbora Palicová	(United Kingdom) Harriet Dart (Australia) Olivia Gadecki	0–6, 2–6
Win	9–11	Nov 2023	ITF Sunderland, UK	W25	Hard (i)	(United Kingdom) Freya Christie	(Georgia (country)) Mariam Bolkvadze (United Kingdom) Samantha Murray Sharan	6–0, 4–6, [10–4]
Loss	9–12	Feb 2024	ITF Roehampton, UK	W50	Hard (i)	(United Kingdom) Ali Collins	(United Kingdom) Freya Christie (United Kingdom) Samantha Murray Sharan	6–7^{(5)}, 3–6
Win	10–12	May 2024	ITF Annenheim, Austria	W35	Clay	(Finland) Laura Hietaranta	(Slovenia) Nika Radišić (Latvia) Daniela Vismane	3–6, 6–3, [10–6]
Win	11–12	Oct 2024	GB Pro-Series Loughborough, UK	W35	Hard (i)	(Greece) Valentini Grammatikopoulou	(United Kingdom) Ella McDonald (United Kingdom) Ranah Stoiber	walkover
Win	12–12	Nov 2025	Trnava Indoor, Slovakia	W50	Hard (i)	(United Kingdom) Alicia Dudeney	Sofya Lansere (Czech Republic) Ivana Šebestová	3–6, 6–3, [10–6]
Win	13–12	Jan 2026	ITF Manchester, UK	W50	Hard (i)	(United Kingdom) Alicia Dudeney	(United Kingdom) Emily Appleton (Poland) Weronika Falkowska	1–6, 7–6^{(6)}, [10–7]
Loss	13–13	Oct 2026	GB Pro-Series Glasgow, UK	W75	Hard (i)	(United Kingdom) Amelia Rajecki	(United Kingdom) Savannah Dada-Mascoll (Kenya) Angella Okutoyi	3–6, 3–6
