= 2023 Billie Jean King Cup =

International women's tennis competition

Details
- Duration: 10 April – 12 November 2023
- Edition: 60th

Achievements (singles)

Canada defeated Italy in the tennis final, 2–0, in winning the 2023 Billie Jean King Cup. This was Canada's first final and title at the Billie Jean King Cup.

The 2023 Billie Jean King Cup was the 60th edition of the Billie Jean King Cup, an international team competition between national teams in women's tennis.
Angola, Bhutan, DR Congo, Macau, Nepal, Qatar, Saudi Arabia, and Tanzania made their first appearances in the tournament.

== Billie Jean King Cup finals ==
Semifinals
Czech Republic | 1
Canada | 2
Italy | 2
Slovenia | 0

Final
Canada | 2
Italy | 0

Date: 7–12 November 2023
Venue: Estadio de la Cartuja, Seville, Spain
Surface: Hard indoor

12 nations take part in the Finals. The qualification is as follows:

- 2 finalists of the 2022 Finals (Australia and Switzerland)
- 1 host nation or wild card
- 9 winners of the 2023 qualifying round

Participating teams
| Australia (2022F) | Canada | Czech Republic | France | Germany | Italy |
| Kazakhstan | Slovenia | Spain (H) | Switzerland (TH) | United States | Poland (WC) |

=== Qualifying round ===
Date: 14–16 April 2023

Eighteen teams will play for nine spots in the Finals, in series decided on a home and away basis.

These eighteen teams are:

- 10 teams ranked 3rd–12th in the 2022 Finals
- 8 winning teams from the 2022 play-offs

The nine winning teams from the qualifying round will play at the Finals and the nine losing teams will play at the 2023 play-offs.

#: Nations Ranking as of 16 November 2022.

Qualified teams

Seeded teams

1. Spain (#3)
2. Czech Republic (#4)
3. France (#5)
4. Canada (#6)
5. United States (#7)
6. Slovakia (#8)
7. Germany (#9)
8. Kazakhstan (#10)
9. Romania (#12)

Unseeded teams

- Italy (#13)
- Belgium (#14)
- Great Britain (#15)
- Poland (#16)
- Brazil (#17)
- Ukraine (#20)
- Mexico (#22)
- Austria (#30)
- Slovenia (#34)

| Home team | Score | Away team | Location | Venue | Surface |
|---|---|---|---|---|---|
| Spain [1] | 3–1 | Mexico | Marbella | Club de Tenis Puente Romano | Clay |
| Ukraine | 1–3 | Czech Republic [2] | Antalya (Turkey) | Megasaray Club Belek | Clay |
| Great Britain | 1–3 | France [3] | Coventry | Coventry Building Society Arena | Hard (i) |
| Canada [4] | 3–2 | Belgium | Vancouver | Pacific Coliseum | Hard (i) |
| United States [5] | 4–0 | Austria | Delray Beach | Delray Beach Tennis Center | Hard |
| Slovakia [6] | 2–3 | Italy | Bratislava | NTC Arena | Hard (i) |
| Germany [7] | 3–1 | Brazil | Stuttgart | Porsche-Arena | Clay (i) |
| Kazakhstan [8] | 3–1 | Poland | Astana | National Tennis Centre | Clay (i) |
| Slovenia | 3–2 | Romania [9] | Koper | Sport Park Bonifika | Clay |

=== Group stage ===
T = Ties, M = Matches, S = Sets

| Group | Winner | | | | Runner-up | | | | Third | | | |
| Group | Nation | T | M | S | Nation | T | M | S | Nation | T | M | S |
|---|---|---|---|---|---|---|---|---|---|---|---|---|
| A | Czech Republic | 2–0 | 5–1 | 10–3 | United States | 1–1 | 4–2 | 8–5 | Switzerland | 0–2 | 0–6 | 2–12 |
| B | Slovenia | 1–1 | 3–3 | 9–6 | Kazakhstan | 1–1 | 3–3 | 7–8 | Australia | 1–1 | 3–3 | 6–8 |
| C | Canada | 2–0 | 6–0 | 12–1 | Spain | 1–1 | 2–4 | 5–9 | Poland | 0–2 | 1–5 | 4–11 |
| D | Italy | 2–0 | 5–1 | 11–5 | France | 1–1 | 4–2 | 10–6 | Germany | 0–2 | 0–6 | 2–12 |

== Billie Jean King Cup play-offs ==
Date: 10–12 November 2023

Sixteen teams played for eight spots in the 2024 qualifying round, in series decided on a home and away basis.

These sixteen teams were:

- 8 losing teams from the qualifying round, in April 2023 (Poland having received a wildcard for the finals)
- 7 winning teams from their Group I zone
- 1 team from their Group I zone (Serbia) to replace Poland.

Eight winners will advance to the 2024 qualifying round while losers will contest in their respective regional Group I event in 2024.

Seeded teams

1. Slovakia (#11)
2. Belgium (#13)
3. Great Britain (#14)
4. Brazil (#15)
5. Ukraine (#16)
6. Romania (#17)
7. Japan (#19)
8. Mexico (#20)

Unseeded teams

- Argentina (#21)
- Austria (#22)
- Serbia (#25)
- Netherlands (#26)
- Hungary (#27)
- Sweden (#28)
- Colombia (#29)
- South Korea (#31)

| Home team | Score | Away team | Location | Venue | Surface |
|---|---|---|---|---|---|
| Slovakia [1] | 3–1 | Argentina | Bratislava | NTC Arena | Hard (i) |
| Belgium [2] | 3–1 | Hungary | Charleroi | Dôme de Charleroi | Hard (i) |
| Great Britain [3] | 3–1 | Sweden | London | Copper Box Arena | Hard (i) |
| Brazil [4] | 4–0 | South Korea | Brasília | Arena BRB | Clay |
| Ukraine [5] | 3–1 | Netherlands | Vilnius (Lithuania) | SEB Arena | Hard (i) |
| Serbia | 0–4 | Romania [6] | Kraljevo | Kraljevo Sports Hall | Clay (i) |
| Japan [7] | 3–2 | Colombia | Tokyo | Ariake Coliseum | Hard (i) |
| Austria | 2–3 | Mexico [8] | Schwechat | Multiversum Schwechat | Clay (i) |

== Americas Zone ==
=== Group I ===
Date: 11–15 April 2023
Venue: Tennis Golf Club, Cúcuta, Colombia (clay, outdoors)

Participating teams

- Argentina
- Bolivia
- Chile
- Colombia
- Guatemala
- Peru

==== Promotions/Relegations ====
- Argentina and Colombia were promoted to the 2023 Billie Jean King Cup play-offs.
- Guatemala and Bolivia were relegated to Americas Zone Group II in 2024.

=== Group II ===
Date: 26–29 July 2023
Venue: Centro Nacional de Tenis Parque del Este, Santo Domingo Este, Dominican Republic (hard, outdoors)

Participating teams

- Bahamas
- Costa Rica
- Dominican Republic
- Ecuador
- Honduras
- Paraguay
- Uruguay
- Venezuela

==== Promotions/Relegations ====
- Ecuador and Venezuela were promoted to Americas Zone Group I in 2024.
- Costa Rica and Bahamas were relegated to Americas Zone Group III in 2024.

=== Group III ===
Date: 18–22 July 2023
Venue: Federación Panameña de Tenis, Panama City, Panama (clay, outdoors)

Participating teams

- Antigua and Barbuda
- Aruba
- Barbados
- Bermuda
- Cuba
- El Salvador
- Jamaica
- Panama
- Puerto Rico
- U.S. Virgin Islands

Withdrawn

- Saint Lucia

Inactive teams

- Eastern Caribbean
- Haiti
- Trinidad and Tobago

==== Promotions ====
- Puerto Rico and Cuba were promoted to Americas Zone Group II in 2024.

== Asia/Oceania Zone ==
=== Group I ===
Date: 10–15 April 2023
Venue: Olympic Tennis School, Tashkent, Uzbekistan (hard, outdoors)

Participating teams

- China
- India
- Japan
- South Korea
- Thailand
- Uzbekistan

==== Play-offs ====
- Japan and South Korea were promoted to the 2023 Billie Jean King Cup play-offs.
- Thailand and Uzbekistan were relegated to Asia/Oceania Zone Group II in 2024.

=== Group II ===
Date: 24–29 July 2023
Venue: National Tennis Center, Kuala Lumpur, Malaysia (hard, outdoors)

Participating teams

- Chinese Taipei
- Guam
- Hong Kong
- Indonesia
- Malaysia
- Mongolia
- New Zealand
- Pacific Oceania
- Pakistan
- Singapore
- Sri Lanka
- Turkmenistan

==== Play-offs ====
- Pacific Oceania and Chinese Taipei were promoted to Asia/Oceania Zone Group I in 2024.
- Turkmenistan and Guam were relegated to Asia/Oceania Zone Group III in 2024.

=== Group III ===
Date: 18–21 October 2023
Venue: Bahrain Tennis Federation, Isa Town, Bahrain (hard, outdoors)

Participating teams

- Bahrain
- Bhutan
- Brunei
- Iran
- Iraq
- Kyrgyzstan
- Laos
- Macau
- Maldives
- Nepal
- Qatar
- Saudi Arabia
- Tajikistan
- Vietnam

Withdrawn

- Myanmar

Inactive teams

- Bangladesh
- Jordan
- Lebanon
- Oman
- Philippines
- Syria

==== Play-offs ====
- Iran and Kyrgyzstan were promoted to Asia/Oceania Zone Group II in 2024.

== Europe/Africa Zone ==
=== Group I ===
Date: 10–15 April 2023

Venue: Megasaray Tennis Academy, Antalya, Turkey (clay, outdoors)

Participating teams

- Bulgaria
- Croatia
- Denmark
- Egypt
- Hungary
- Latvia
- Netherlands
- Norway
- Serbia
- Sweden
- Turkey

Promotions/Relegations

- Sweden, Hungary, and Netherlands advanced to the 2023 Billie Jean King Cup play-offs, while Serbia was later promoted.
- Egypt and Croatia were relegated to Europe/Africa Zone Group II in 2024.

=== Group II ===
Date: 10–15 April 2023

Venue: Jamor Sports Complex, Oeiras, Portugal (clay, outdoors)

Participating teams

Pool A

- Bosnia and Herzegovina
- Greece
- Israel
- Malta
- Portugal

Pool B

- Estonia
- Georgia
- Ireland
- Kosovo
- Lithuania
- South Africa

Withdrawn

- Algeria

==== Play-offs ====
- Portugal and Greece were promoted to Europe/Africa Zone Group I in 2024.
- South Africa and Ireland were respectively relegated to Africa Zone Group III and Europe Zone Group III in 2024.

=== Group III Europe ===
Date: 19-24 June 2023

Venue: Tennis Club Jug, Skopje, North Macedonia (clay, outdoors)

Participating teams

- Albania
- Armenia
- Azerbaijan
- Cyprus
- Finland
- Iceland
- Luxembourg
- Montenegro
- North Macedonia
- Moldova
- San Marino

Inactive Teams

- Belarus (suspended)
- Liechtenstein
- Russia (suspended)

==== Play-offs ====
- North Macedonia was promoted to Europe/Africa Zone Group II in 2024.

=== Group III Africa ===
Date: 12-17 June 2023

Venue: Nairobi Club, Nairobi, Kenya (clay, outdoors)

Participating teams

- Botswana
- Burundi
- Ghana
- Kenya
- Mauritius
- Morocco
- Namibia
- Nigeria
- Seychelles
- Tunisia
- Uganda
- Zimbabwe

==== Play-offs ====
- Morocco was promoted to Europe/Africa Zone Group II in 2024.
- Seychelles was relegated to Africa Zone Group IV in 2024.

=== Group IV Africa ===
Date: 5-10 June 2023
Venue: Ecology Tennis Club, Kigali, Rwanda (clay, outdoors)

Participating teams

- Angola
- Cameroon
- Congo
- DR Congo
- Ethiopia
- Lesotho
- Madagascar
- Mozambique
- Rwanda
- Senegal
- Tanzania

==== Play-offs ====
- Madagascar was promoted to Africa Zone Group III in 2024.
