= Slovakia Billie Jean King Cup team =

Slovak national women's tennis team

Slovakia
- Captain: Matej Lipták
- Nations Ranking: 4 ▲6 (4 December 2024)
- Highest ranking: 1 (Dec 2002)
- Lowest ranking: 17 (23 April 2007)
- Colors: blue, red & white
- First year: 1994
- Years played: 23
- Ties played (W–L): 76 (45–31)
- Years in World Group: 12 (15–11)
- Titles: 1 (2002)
- Most total wins: Daniela Hantuchová (36–20)
- Most singles wins: Daniela Hantuchová (31–14)
- Most doubles wins: Janette Husárová (11–6)
- Best doubles team: Viktória Hrunčáková / Tereza Mihalíková (9–3)
- Most ties played: Daniela Hantuchová (30)
- Most years played: Daniela Hantuchová (15)

The Slovakia women's national tennis team represents Slovakia in Fed Cup tennis competition and are governed by the Slovak Tennis Association.

== History ==
Slovakia competed in its first Fed Cup in 1994. They won the Cup in 2002, being led by then top ten player Daniela Hantuchová.

Prior to 1992, Slovak players represented Czechoslovakia.

== Current team (2026) ==
Rankings as of 6 April 2026.

Name	Born	First	Last		Ties	Win/Loss			Ranks	
Name	Born	First	Year	Tie	Ties	Sin	Dou	Tot	Sin	Dou
Anna Karolína Schmiedlová	13 September 1994	2012	2024	Slovenia	18	10–10	3–4	13–14	—	—
Rebecca Šramková	19 October 1996	2017	2026	Croatia	16	8–9	1–2	9–11	121	110
Viktória Hrunčáková	11 May 1998	2018	2026	Croatia	21	15–6	9–5	24–11	215	156
Renáta Jamrichová	20 June 2007	2023	2025	United States	4	2–2	0–0	2–2	339	554
Tereza Mihalíková	2 June 1998	2016	2026	Croatia	15	0–0	10–5	10–5	—	30
Mia Pohánková	21 October 2008	2025	2026	Croatia	4	2–1	1–0	3–1	342	—
Katarína Kužmová	7 August 2001	2025	2025	Switzerland	2	0–0	0–2	0–2	321	242
Nina Vargová	9 September 2005	2025	2025	Switzerland	2	0–0	0–2	0–2	666	244

== Managers ==
The following managers have led the Slovak team since 1994:

Name	Tenure	Ties	Won	Lost	Win %	Best Result
(Czech Republic) Jan Kukal	1994	6	5	1	83.3	L in 1994 World Group, Second Round
(Czech Republic) Ľubomír Kurhajec	1995–1996	4	2	2	50.0	L in 1996 World Group play-offs
(Slovakia) Radka Zrubáková	1997–1998	4	3	1	75.0	W in 1998 World Group play-offs
(Slovakia) Peter Vajda	1999–2001	7	2	5	28.6	L in 1999 World Group, Semi-finals
(Slovakia) Tomáš Malik	2002–2004	8	6	2	75.0	2002 World Group Champions
(Slovakia) Marián Vajda	2005	2	0	2	00.0	L in 2005 World Group II
(Slovakia) Mojmír Mihal	2006–2008	9	7	2	77.8	L in 2008 World Group II
(Slovakia) Matej Lipták	2009–2026	40	22	18	55	L in 2024 Billie Jean King Cup Final
Totals		80	47	33	58.8	

As of 10 April 2026 13:47 CET

== Results ==
=== 1994-2019 ===
Tournament	1994	1995	1996	1997	1998	1999	2000	2001	2002	2003	2004	2005	2006	2007	2008	2009	2010	2011	2012	2013	2014	2015	2016	2017	2018	2019	W–L
Fed Cup
World Group	2R	A	A	A	A	SF	11th	QF	W	QF	1R	A	A	A	A	A	A	1R	A	SF	QF	A	A	A	A	A	24–14
World Group play-offs	NH	A	L	A	W	A	NH	A	A	A	W	A	A	A	A	L	W	L	W	A	L	A	A	L	L	A	5–3
World Group II	NH	L	W	L	W	A	Not Held					L	A	L	L	W	W	A	W	A	A	L	L	W	W	L	2–3
World Group II play-offs	NH	W	A	W	A	A	Not Held					L	W	W	W	A	A	A	A	A	A	W	W	A	A	W	2–2
Europe/Africa Group I	W	A	A	A	A	A	A	A	A	A	A	A	W	A	A	A	A	A	A	A	A	A	A	A	A	A	8–1
Win–loss	5–1	1–1	1–1	1–1	2–0	1–1	0–3	1–1	4–0	1–1	1–1	0–2	5–0	1–1	1–1	1–1	2–0	0–2	2–0	1–1	0–2	1–1	1–1	1–1	1–1	1–1	36–26
Year End Ranking								1	2	4	7						6		8	5							

=== 2020-2026 ===
Tournament	2020	2021	2022	2023	2024	2025	2026	W–L
Billie Jean King Cup
Finals	P	GS	GS	A	F	A	A	5–3
Qualifying round	W	NH	w/o	L	W	L	A	2–2
Play-offs	P	A	A	W	A	L	A	1–1
Europe/Africa Group I	A	NH	A	A	A	A	GS	3–1
Win–loss	1–0	1–1	1–1	1–1	4–1	1–3	3–1	48–34
Year End Ranking		12	8	11	4	11		

=== Finals: 2 (1 title, 1 runner-ups) ===
Outcome	Year	Venue	Surface	Team	Opponents	Opposing Team	Score
Winner	2002	Palacio de Congresos de Maspalomas, Gran Canaria, Spain	Hard (i)	Janette Husárová; Daniela Hantuchová; Henrieta Nagyová; Martina Suchá	Spain	Conchita Martínez; Magüi Serna; Arantxa Sánchez Vicario	3–1
Loser	2024	Martin Carpena Arena, Málaga, Spain	Hard (i)	Anna Karolína Schmiedlová; Rebecca Šramková; Viktória Hrunčáková; Renáta Jamrichová; Tereza Mihalíková	Italy	Jasmine Paolini; Elisabetta Cocciaretto; Lucia Bronzetti; Sara Errani; Martina Trevisan	0–2

=== By decade ===
==== 1994–1999 ====
Year	Competition	Date	Surface	Location	Opponent	Score	Result
1994	Europe/Africa Zone, Round Robin (Group E)	18 April	Clay	Bad Waltersdorf (AUT)	Lithuania	3–0	Won
1994	Europe/Africa Zone, Round Robin (Group E)	21 April	Clay	Bad Waltersdorf (AUT)	Greece	3–0	Won
1994	Europe/Africa Zone, 1st round	22 April	Clay	Bad Waltersdorf (AUT)	Greece	3–0	Won
1994	Europe/Africa Zone Play-offs	23 April	Clay	Bad Waltersdorf (AUT)	Georgia	2–1	Won
1994	World Group, 1st round	18 July	Clay	Frankfurt (GER)	Finland	2–1	Won
1994	World Group, 2nd round	20 July	Clay	Frankfurt (GER)	Germany	1–2	Lost
1995	World Group II	22–23 April	Grass	Perth (AUS)	Australia	2–3	Lost
1995	World Group II play-offs	22–23 July	Clay	Asunción (PAR)	Paraguay	5–0	Won
1996	World Group II	27–28 April	Clay	Plovdiv (BUL)	Bulgaria	5–0	Won
1996	World Group play-offs	13–14 July	Clay	Bratislava (SVK)	Netherlands	2–3	Lost
1997	World Group II	1–2 March	Carpet (i)	Košice (SVK)	Switzerland	2–3	Lost
1997	World Group II play-offs	12–13 July	Clay	Bratislava (SVK)	Canada	5–0	Won
1998	World Group II	18–19 April	Clay	Buenos Aires (ARG)	Argentina	4–1	Won
1998	World Group play-offs	25–26 July	Clay	Bratislava (SVK)	Belgium	4–1	Won
1999	World Group, Quarterfinals	17–18 April	Carpet (i)	Zürich (SUI)	Switzerland	5–0	Won
1999	World Group, Semi-finals	24–25 July	Clay	Moscow (RUS)	Russia	2–3	Lost

==== 2000–2009 ====
Year	Competition	Date	Surface	Location	Opponent	Score	Result
2000	World Group, Round Robin (Group B)	27 April	Hard (i)	Bratislava (SVK)	Switzerland	1–2	Lost
2000	World Group, Round Robin (Group B)	29 April	Hard (i)	Bratislava (SVK)	Czech Republic	1–2	Lost
2000	World Group, Round Robin (Group B)	30 April	Hard (i)	Bratislava (SVK)	Austria	0–2	Lost
2001	World Group play-offs, 1st round	28–29 April	Clay	Bratislava (SVK)	Hungary	4–1	Won
2001	World Group play-offs, Quarterfinal	21–23 July	Clay	Bratislava (SVK)	Russia	2–3	Lost
2002	World Group, 1st round	27–28 April	Clay	Bratislava (SVK)	Switzerland	3–2	Won
2002	World Group, Quarterfinal	20–21 July	Carpet (i)	Bratislava (SVK)	France	4–1	Won
2002	World Group, Semifinal	30–31 October	Hard (i)	Gran Canaria (ESP)	Italy	3–1	Won
2002	World Group, Final	2–3 November	Hard (i)	Gran Canaria (ESP)	Spain	3–1	Champion
2003	World Group, 1st round	26–27 April	Clay	Ettenheim (GER)	Germany	3–2	Won
2003	World Group, Quarterfinal	19–20 July	Hard (i)	Charleroi (BEL)	Belgium	0–5	Lost
2004	World Group, 1st round	24–25 April	Clay	Sankt Pölten (AUT)	Austria	2–3	Lost
2004	World Group play-offs	10–11 July	Clay	Bratislava (SVK)	Belarus	4–0	Won
2005	World Group II	23–24 April	Hard (i)	Neuchâtel (SUI)	Switzerland	2–3	Lost
2005	World Group II play-offs	9–10 July	Hard	Pathum Thani (THA)	Thailand	1–4	Lost
2006	Europe/Africa Zone, Group I (Pool A)	17 April	Clay	Plovdiv (BUL)	Luxembourg	3–0	Won
2006	Europe/Africa Zone, Group I (Pool A)	18 April	Clay	Plovdiv (BUL)	Netherlands	2–1	Won
2006	Europe/Africa Zone, Group I (Pool A)	19 April	Clay	Plovdiv (BUL)	Finland	3–0	Won
2006	Europe/Africa Zone, Promotion Play-off	22 April	Clay	Plovdiv (BUL)	Great Britain	2–1	Won
2006	World Group II play-offs	14–15 July	Hard (i)	Bratislava (SVK)	Thailand	5–0	Won
2007	World Group II	21–22 April	Clay	Bratislava (SVK)	Czech Republic	0–5	Lost
2007	World Group II play-offs	14–15 July	Hard (i)	Košice (SVK)	Serbia	4–1	Won
2008	World Group II	2–3 February	Carpet (i)	Brno (CZE)	Czech Republic	2–3	Lost
2008	World Group II play-offs	26–27 April	Clay (i)	Bratislava (SVK)	Uzbekistan	5–0	Won
2009	World Group II	7–8 February	Hard (i)	Bratislava (SVK)	Belgium	4–1	Won
2009	World Group play-offs	25–26 April	Clay (i)	Limoges (FRA)	France	2–3	Lost

==== 2010–2019 ====
Year	Competition	Date	Surface	Location	Opponent	Score	Result
2010	World Group II	6–7 February	Hard (i)	Bratislava (SVK)	China	3–2	Won
2010	World Group play-offs	24–25 April	Clay (i)	Belgrade (SRB)	Serbia	3–2	Won
2011	World Group, 1st round	5–6 February	Hard (i)	Bratislava (SVK)	Czech Republic	2–3	Lost
2011	World Group play-offs	16–17 April	Clay (i)	Bratislava (SVK)	Serbia	2–3	Lost
2012	World Group II, 1st round	4–5 February	Hard (i)	Bratislava (SVK)	France	3–2	Won
2012	World Group play-offs	16–17 April	Clay (i)	Marbella (ESP)	Spain	3–2	Won
2013	World Group, 1st round	9–10 February	Hard (i)	Niš (SRB)	Serbia	3–2	Won
2013	World Group, Semifinal	20–21 April	Clay (i)	Moscow (RUS)	Russia	2–3	Lost
2014	World Group, 1st round	8–9 February	Hard (i)	Bratislava (SVK)	Germany	1–3	Lost
2014	World Group play-offs	19–20 April	Hard (i)	Quebec (CAN)	Canada	1–3	Lost
2015	World Group II, 1st round	7–8 February	Clay (i)	Apeldoorn (NED)	Netherlands	1–4	Lost
2015	World Group II, Play-offs	18–19 April	Clay (i)	Bratislava (SVK)	Sweden	4–0	Won
2016	World Group II, 1st round	6–7 February	Hard (i)	Bratislava (SVK)	Australia	2–3	Lost
2016	World Group II, Play-offs	16–17 April	Clay (i)	Bratislava (SVK)	Canada	3–2	Won
2017	World Group II, 1st round	11–12 February	Clay (i)	Forlì (ITA)	Italy	3–2	Won
2017	World Group play-offs	22–23 April	Clay (i)	Bratislava (SVK)	Netherlands	2–3	Lost
2018	World Group II, 1st round	10–11 February	Hard (i)	Bratislava (SVK)	Russia	4–1	Won
2018	World Group play-offs	21–22 April	Hard (i)	Minsk (BLR)	Belarus	2–3	Lost
2019	World Group II, 1st round	10–11 February	Hard (i)	Riga (LAT)	Latvia	0–4	Lost
2019	World Group II, Play-offs	20–21 April	Clay (i)	Bratislava (SVK)	Brazil	3–1	Won

==== 2020–2029 ====
Year	Competition	Date	Surface	Location	Opponent	Score	Result
2020–21	Finals Qualifying Round	6–7 Feb 2020	Clay (i)	Bratislava (SVK)	Great Britain	3–1	Won
2020–21	Finals, Group stage (Group C)	1 November 2021	Hard (i)	Prague (CZE)	Spain	1–2	Lost
2020–21	Finals, Group stage (Group C)	2 November 2021	Hard (i)	Prague (CZE)	United States	2–1	Won
2022	Finals Qualifying Round	15–16 Apr	–	– (AUS)	Australia	d w/o	
2022	Finals, Group stage (Group C)	8 Nov	Hard (i)	Glasgow (GBR)	Australia	1–2	Lost
2022	Finals, Group stage (Group C)	9 Nov	Hard (i)	Glasgow (GBR)	Belgium	2–1	Won
2023	Finals Qualifying Round	14–15 Apr	Hard (i)	Bratislava (SVK)	Italy	2–3	Lost
2023	Finals Play-Offs	10–12 Nov	Hard (i)	Bratislava (SVK)	Argentina	3–1	Won
2024	Finals Qualifying Round	12–14 Apr	Hard (i)	Bratislava (SVK)	Slovenia	4–0	Won
2024	Finals, First round	14 Nov	Hard (i)	Málaga (ESP)	United States	2–1	Won
2024	Finals, Quarterfinals	17 Nov	Hard (i)	Málaga (ESP)	Australia	2–0	Won
2024	Finals, Semi-finals	19 Nov	Hard (i)	Málaga (ESP)	Great Britain	2–1	Won
2024	Finals	20 Nov	Hard (i)	Málaga (ESP)	Italy	0–2	Lost
2025	Finals Qualifying Round	11–13 Apr	Hard (i)	Bratislava (SVK)	Denmark	3–0	Won
2025	Finals Qualifying Round	11–13 Apr	Hard (i)	Bratislava (SVK)	United States	1–2	Lost
2025	Finals Play-Offs	14–16 Nov	Clay	Córdoba (ARG)	Argentina	0–3	Lost
2025	Finals Play-Offs	14–16 Nov	Clay	Córdoba (ARG)	Switzerland	1–2	Lost
2026	Europe/Africa Zone, Group I (Pool A)	7–10 Apr	Clay	Oeiras (POR)	Serbia	1–2	Lost
2026	Europe/Africa Zone, Group I (Pool A)	7–10 Apr	Clay	Oeiras (POR)	Lithuania	3–0	Won
2026	Europe/Africa Zone, Group I (Pool A)	7–10 Apr	Clay	Oeiras (POR)	Croatia	3–0	Won
2026	Europe/Africa Zone, Group I, Positional Play-off	7–10 Apr	Clay	Oeiras (POR)	Portugal	2–0	Won

Notes

1. ^{1}Prior to the qualifying round both Russia and Belarus were suspended from taking part in international events by the ITF due to Russian invasion of Ukraine. Australia, the runner-up from 2020, was given the defending champion's right to advance. They were scheduled to play Slovakia, who advanced by walkover

== See also ==
- Billie Jean King Cup
- Slovakia Davis Cup team
- Slovakia at the Hopman Cup
- Czech Republic Billie Jean King Cup team
