= 2020 Billie Jean King Cup qualifying round =

Subsection of tennis competition

The 2020 Billie Jean King Cup qualifying round was played on 7–8 February 2020. The eight winners of this round qualified for the 2020 Billie Jean King Cup Finals in Budapest.

== Teams ==
Sixteen teams played for eight spots in the Finals, in series decided on a home and away basis.

These sixteen teams were:

- 2 losing semifinalists of the previous edition,
- 7 winners & losers of World Group play-offs of previous edition, and
- 4 winners of World Group II play-offs of previous edition, and
- 3 losers of World Group II play-offs of previous edition, based on rankings

The 8 losing teams from the qualifying round played at the Group I of the corresponding continental zone the following February.

Seeded teams

1. United States
2. Belarus
3. Romania
4. Germany
5. Spain
6. Switzerland
7. Belgium
8. Great Britain

Unseeded teams:

- Brazil
- Canada
- Japan
- Kazakhstan
- Latvia
- Netherlands
- Russia
- Slovakia

== Results ==
Home team	Score	Away team	Location	Venue	Surface
United States [1]	3–2	Latvia	Everett	Angel of the Winds Arena	Hard (i)
Netherlands	2–3	Belarus [2]	The Hague	Sportcampus Zuiderpark	Clay (i)
Romania [3]	2–3	Russia	Cluj-Napoca	BT Arena	Hard (i)
Brazil	0–4	Germany [4]	Florianópolis	Costão do Santinho Resort	Clay
Spain [5]	3–1	Japan	Cartagena	Centro de Tenis La Manga Club	Clay
Switzerland [6]	3–1	Canada	Biel/Bienne	Swiss Tennis Arena	Hard (i)
Belgium [7]	3–1	Kazakhstan	Kortrijk	SC Lange Munte	Hard (i)
Slovakia	3–1	Great Britain [8]	Bratislava	AXA Aréna NTC	Clay (i)

== Detailed results ==
=== United States vs. Latvia ===
United States
3
Angel of the Winds Arena, Everett, United States
7–8 February
Hard (i)

Latvia
2

			1	2	3
1	(United States) (Latvia)	Sofia Kenin; Anastasija Sevastova	6; 2	6; 2
2	(United States) (Latvia)	Serena Williams; Jeļena Ostapenko	7^{7} 6^{4}	7^{7} 6^{3}
3	(United States) (Latvia)	Sofia Kenin; Jeļena Ostapenko	3; 6	6; 2	2; 6
4	(United States) (Latvia)	Serena Williams; Anastasija Sevastova	6^{5} 7^{7}	6; 3	6^{4} 7^{7}
5	(United States) (Latvia)	Sofia Kenin / Bethanie Mattek-Sands; Jeļena Ostapenko / Anastasija Sevastova	6; 4	6; 0

Team nominations:
United States: Sofia Kenin, Serena Williams, Alison Riske, Coco Gauff, Bethanie Mattek-Sands
Latvia: Jeļena Ostapenko, Anastasija Sevastova, Diāna Marcinkēviča, Daniela Vismane

=== Netherlands vs. Belarus ===
Netherlands
2
Sportcampus Zuiderpark, The Hague, Netherlands
7–8 February
Clay (i)

Belarus
3

			1	2	3
1	(Netherlands) (Belarus)	Kiki Bertens; Aliaksandra Sasnovich	6^{5} 7^{7}	6; 2	6; 1
2	(Netherlands) (Belarus)	Arantxa Rus; Aryna Sabalenka	2; 6	3; 6
3	(Netherlands) (Belarus)	Kiki Bertens; Aryna Sabalenka	6; 4	6; 4
4	(Netherlands) (Belarus)	Arantxa Rus; Aliaksandra Sasnovich	6; 0	5; 7	2; 6
5	(Netherlands) (Belarus)	Kiki Bertens / Demi Schuurs; Aryna Sabalenka / Aliaksandra Sasnovich	6; 4	3; 6	6^{8} 7^{10}

Team nominations:
Netherlands: Kiki Bertens, Arantxa Rus, Lesley Pattinama Kerkhove, Indy de Vroome, Demi Schuurs
Belarus: Aryna Sabalenka, Aliaksandra Sasnovich, Olga Govortsova, Anna Kubareva, Lidziya Marozava

=== Romania vs. Russia ===
Romania
2
BT Arena, Cluj-Napoca, Romania
7–8 February
Hard (i)

Russia
3

			1	2	3
1	(Romania) (Russia)	Elena-Gabriela Ruse; Ekaterina Alexandrova	1; 6	4; 6
2	(Romania) (Russia)	Ana Bogdan; Veronika Kudermetova	6; 3	6^{5} 7^{7}	6; 1
3	(Romania) (Russia)	Ana Bogdan; Ekaterina Alexandrova	5; 7	6; 3	5; 7
4	(Romania) (Russia)	Jaqueline Cristian; Veronika Kudermetova	7; 5	6; 3
5	(Romania) (Russia)	Jaqueline Cristian / Elena-Gabriela Ruse; Anna Blinkova / Anna Kalinskaya	3; 6	2; 6

Team nominations:
Romania: Ana Bogdan, Irina Bara, Elena-Gabriela Ruse, Jaqueline Cristian, Raluca Olaru
Russia: Ekaterina Alexandrova, Veronika Kudermetova, Anna Blinkova, Anna Kalinskaya

=== Brazil vs. Germany ===
Brazil
0
Costão do Santinho Resort, Florianópolis, Brazil
7–8 February
Clay

Germany
4

			1	2	3
1	(Brazil) (Germany)	Teliana Pereira; Laura Siegemund	3; 6	3; 6
2	(Brazil) (Germany)	Gabriela Cé; Tatjana Maria	3; 6	6^{5} 7^{7}
3	(Brazil) (Germany)	Gabriela Cé; Laura Siegemund	1; 6	2; 6
4	(Brazil) (Germany)	Teliana Pereira; Tatjana Maria				not played
5	(Brazil) (Germany)	Laura Pigossi / Luisa Stefani; Anna-Lena Friedsam / Antonia Lottner	1; 6	4; 6

Team nominations:
Brazil: Gabriela Cé, Teliana Pereira, Laura Pigossi, Carolina Alves, Luisa Stefani
Germany: Laura Siegemund, Tatjana Maria, Anna-Lena Friedsam, Antonia Lottner

=== Spain vs. Japan ===
Spain
3
Centro de Tenis La Manga Club, Cartagena, Spain
7–8 February
Clay

Japan
1

			1	2	3
1	(Spain) (Japan)	Sara Sorribes Tormo; Naomi Osaka	6; 0	6; 3
2	(Spain) (Japan)	Carla Suárez Navarro; Misaki Doi	6; 3	6; 4
3	(Spain) (Japan)	Carla Suárez Navarro; Kurumi Nara	6; 1	6; 3
4	(Spain) (Japan)	Sara Sorribes Tormo; Misaki Doi				not played
5	(Spain) (Japan)	Lara Arruabarrena / Aliona Bolsova; Shuko Aoyama / Ena Shibahara	2; 6	3; 6

Team nominations:
Spain: Carla Suárez Navarro, Sara Sorribes Tormo, Aliona Bolsova, Lara Arruabarrena, Georgina García Pérez
Japan: Naomi Osaka, Misaki Doi, Kurumi Nara, Ena Shibahara, Shuko Aoyama

=== Switzerland vs. Canada ===
Switzerland
3
Swiss Tennis Arena, Biel/Bienne, Switzerland
7–8 February
Hard (i)

Canada
1

			1	2	3
1	(Switzerland) (Canada)	Jil Teichmann; Leylah Annie Fernandez	7^{7} 6^{4}	6; 4
2	(Switzerland) (Canada)	Belinda Bencic; Gabriela Dabrowski	6; 1	6; 2
3	(Switzerland) (Canada)	Belinda Bencic; Leylah Annie Fernandez	2; 6	6^{3} 7^{7}
4	(Switzerland) (Canada)	Jil Teichmann; Gabriela Dabrowski	6; 3	6; 4
5	(Switzerland) (Canada)	Viktorija Golubic / Stefanie Vögele; Bianca Andreescu / Gabriela Dabrowski				not played

Team nominations:
Switzerland: Belinda Bencic, Jil Teichmann, Viktorija Golubic, Stefanie Vögele, Timea Bacsinszky
Canada: Bianca Andreescu, Leylah Annie Fernandez, Eugenie Bouchard, Gabriela Dabrowski

=== Belgium vs. Kazakhstan ===
Belgium
3
SC Lange Munte, Kortrijk, Belgium
7–8 February
Hard (i)

Kazakhstan
1

			1	2	3
1	(Belgium) (Kazakhstan)	Elise Mertens; Zarina Diyas	1; 6	6; 2	6; 1
2	(Belgium) (Kazakhstan)	Ysaline Bonaventure; Yulia Putintseva	6; 3	6^{2} 7^{7}	2; 6
3	(Belgium) (Kazakhstan)	Elise Mertens; Yulia Putintseva	6; 1	7^{7} 6^{1}
4	(Belgium) (Kazakhstan)	Kirsten Flipkens; Zarina Diyas	6; 3	6; 4
5	(Belgium) (Kazakhstan)	Kirsten Flipkens / Greet Minnen; Anna Danilina / Yaroslava Shvedova				not played

Team nominations:
Belgium: Elise Mertens, Kirsten Flipkens, Greet Minnen, Ysaline Bonaventure
Kazakhstan: Yulia Putintseva, Zarina Diyas, Anna Danilina, Yaroslava Shvedova

=== Slovakia vs. Great Britain ===
Slovakia
3
AXA Aréna NTC, Bratislava, Slovakia
7–8 February
Clay (i)

Great Britain
1

			1	2	3
1	(Slovakia) (United Kingdom)	Anna Karolína Schmiedlová; Heather Watson	6; 2	6; 3
2	(Slovakia) (United Kingdom)	Viktória Kužmová; Harriet Dart	6^{3} 7^{7}	6; 3	7; 5
3	(Slovakia) (United Kingdom)	Rebecca Šramková; Heather Watson	0; 6	5; 7
4	(Slovakia) (United Kingdom)	Anna Karolína Schmiedlová; Harriet Dart	7; 5	6; 3
5	(Slovakia) (United Kingdom)	Viktória Kužmová / Magdaléna Rybáriková; Naiktha Bains / Emma Raducanu				not played

Team nominations:
Slovakia: Viktória Kužmová, Jana Čepelová, Magdaléna Rybáriková, Anna Karolína Schmiedlová, Rebecca Šramková
Great Britain: Heather Watson, Harriet Dart, Naiktha Bains, Katie Swan, Emma Raducanu
