= 2023 Billie Jean King Cup play-offs =

Part of tennis tournament

The 2023 Billie Jean King Cup play-offs were held from 10 to 12 November 2023.

== Teams ==
Sixteen teams played for eight spots in the 2024 qualifying round, in series decided on a home and away basis.

These sixteen teams were:

- 8 losing teams from the qualifying round, in April 2023 (Poland having received a wildcard for the finals)
- 7 winning teams from their Group I zone
- 1 team from their Group I zone (Serbia) to replace Poland.

Eight winners will advance to the 2024 qualifying round while losers will contest in their respective regional Group I event in 2024.

Seeded teams

1. Slovakia (#11)
2. Belgium (#13)
3. Great Britain (#14)
4. Brazil (#15)
5. Ukraine (#16)
6. Romania (#17)
7. Japan (#19)
8. Mexico (#20)

Unseeded teams

- Argentina (#21)
- Austria (#22)
- Serbia (#25)
- Netherlands (#26)
- Hungary (#27)
- Sweden (#28)
- Colombia (#29)
- South Korea (#31)

== Results summary ==
Home team	Score	Away team	Location	Venue	Surface
Slovakia [1]	3–1	Argentina	Bratislava	NTC Arena	Hard (i)
Belgium [2]	3–1	Hungary	Charleroi	Dôme de Charleroi	Hard (i)
Great Britain [3]	3–1	Sweden	London	Copper Box Arena	Hard (i)
Brazil [4]	4–0	South Korea	Brasília	Arena BRB	Clay
Ukraine [5]	3–1	Netherlands	Vilnius (Lithuania)	SEB Arena	Hard (i)
Serbia	0–4	Romania [6]	Kraljevo	Kraljevo Sports Hall	Clay (i)
Japan [7]	3–2	Colombia	Tokyo	Ariake Coliseum	Hard (i)
Austria	2–3	Mexico [8]	Schwechat	Multiversum Schwechat	Clay (i)

== Results ==
=== Slovakia vs. Argentina ===
Slovakia
3
NTC Arena, Bratislava, Slovakia
10–11 November 2023
Hard (i)

Argentina
1

			1	2	3
1	(Slovakia) (Argentina)	Anna Karolína Schmiedlová; Julia Riera	5; 7	5; 7
2	(Slovakia) (Argentina)	Viktória Hrunčáková; Nadia Podoroska	3; 6	6; 3	6; 3
3	(Slovakia) (Argentina)	Renáta Jamrichová; Nadia Podoroska	6; 1	6; 4
4	(Slovakia) (Argentina)	Viktória Hrunčáková; Julia Riera	3; 6	6; 4	6; 4
5	(Slovakia) (Argentina)	Viktória Hrunčáková / Tereza Mihalíková; Martina Capurro Taborda / Guillermina Naya				not played

=== Belgium vs. Hungary ===
Belgium
3
Dôme de Charleroi, Charleroi, Belgium
11–12 November 2023
Hard (i)

Hungary
1

			1	2	3
1	(Belgium) (Hungary)	Greet Minnen; Dalma Gálfi	3; 6	3; 6
2	(Belgium) (Hungary)	Yanina Wickmayer; Anna Bondár	7; 5	6; 2
3	(Belgium) (Hungary)	Greet Minnen; Anna Bondár	3; 6	6; 3	6; 4
4	(Belgium) (Hungary)	Yanina Wickmayer; Dalma Gálfi	6; 2	6^{4} 7^{7}	6; 1
5	(Belgium) (Hungary)	Marie Benoît / Kimberley Zimmermann; Tímea Babos / Fanny Stollár				not played

=== Great Britain vs. Sweden ===
Great Britain
3
Copper Box Arena, London, Great Britain
11–12 November 2023
Hard (i)

Sweden
1

			1	2	3
1	(United Kingdom) (Sweden)	Jodie Burrage; Kajsa Rinaldo Persson	4; 6	1; 6
2	(United Kingdom) (Sweden)	Katie Boulter; Caijsa Hennemann	6; 2	6; 1
3	(United Kingdom) (Sweden)	Katie Boulter; Kajsa Rinaldo Persson	6; 1	7^{7} 6^{5}
4	(United Kingdom) (Sweden)	Harriet Dart; Caijsa Hennemann	7; 5	6; 2
5	(United Kingdom) (Sweden)	Harriet Dart / Heather Watson; Bella Bergkvist Larsson / Lisa Zaar				not played

=== Brazil vs. South Korea ===
Brazil
4
Arena BRB, Brasília, Brazil
10–11 November 2023
Clay

South Korea
0

			1	2	3
1	(Brazil) (South Korea)	Laura Pigossi; Park So-hyun	6; 1	6; 1
2	(Brazil) (South Korea)	Beatriz Haddad Maia; Ku Yeon-woo	6; 0	6; 4
3	(Brazil) (South Korea)	Beatriz Haddad Maia; Park So-hyun	6; 2	6; 1
4	(Brazil) (South Korea)	Laura Pigossi; Ku Yeon-woo				not played
5	(Brazil) (South Korea)	Ingrid Gamarra Martins / Luisa Stefani; Back Da-yeon / Jeong Bo-young	6; 1	6; 2

=== Ukraine vs. Netherlands ===
Ukraine
3
SEB Arena, Vilnius, Lithuania
11–12 November 2023
Hard (i)

Netherlands
1

			1	2	3
1	(Ukraine) (Netherlands)	Anhelina Kalinina; Suzan Lamens	6; 2	6; 3
2	(Ukraine) (Netherlands)	Dayana Yastremska; Arantxa Rus	3; 6	2; 6
3	(Ukraine) (Netherlands)	Anhelina Kalinina; Arantxa Rus	6; 4	6; 4
4	(Ukraine) (Netherlands)	Dayana Yastremska; Suzan Lamens	4; 6	6; 1	7; 5
5	(Ukraine) (Netherlands)	Lyudmyla Kichenok / Nadiia Kichenok; Arianne Hartono / Demi Schuurs				not played

=== Serbia vs. Romania ===
Serbia
0
Kraljevo Sports Hall, Kraljevo, Serbia
10–11 November 2023
Clay (i)

Romania
4

			1	2	3
1	(Serbia) (Romania)	Mia Ristić; Elena-Gabriela Ruse	6^{2} 7^{7}	3; 6
2	(Serbia) (Romania)	Aleksandra Krunić; Jaqueline Cristian	5; 7	4; 6
3	(Serbia) (Romania)	Lola Radivojević; Jaqueline Cristian	5; 7	6; 4	5; 7
4	(Serbia) (Romania)	Aleksandra Krunić; Elena-Gabriela Ruse				not played
5	(Serbia) (Romania)	Katarina Kozarov / Aleksandra Krunić; Monica Niculescu / Anca Todoni	1; 6	6^{3} 7^{7}

=== Japan vs. Colombia ===
Japan
3
Ariake Coliseum, Tokyo, Japan
10–11 November 2023
Hard (i)

Colombia
2

			1	2	3
1	(Japan) (Colombia)	Mai Hontama; Camila Osorio	4; 6	4; 6
2	(Japan) (Colombia)	Nao Hibino; Yuliana Lizarazo	6; 2	6; 4
3	(Japan) (Colombia)	Nao Hibino; Camila Osorio	2; 6	0; 6
4	(Japan) (Colombia)	Mai Hontama; María Herazo González	6; 2	6; 2
5	(Japan) (Colombia)	Shuko Aoyama / Ena Shibahara; Yuliana Lizarazo / Camila Osorio	7; 5	6; 2

=== Austria vs. Mexico ===
Austria
2
Multiversum Schwechat, Schwechat, Austria
11–12 November 2023
Clay (i)

Mexico
3

			1	2	3
1	(Austria) (Mexico)	Tamira Paszek; Fernanda Contreras Gómez	2; 6	5; 7
2	(Austria) (Mexico)	Sinja Kraus; Giuliana Olmos	7; 5	6; 2
3	(Austria) (Mexico)	Sinja Kraus; Fernanda Contreras Gómez	6; 0	2; 6	4; 6
4	(Austria) (Mexico)	Tamira Paszek; Giuliana Olmos	7; 5	5; 7	6; 3
5	(Austria) (Mexico)	Melanie Klaffner / Sinja Kraus; Fernanda Contreras Gómez / Giuliana Olmos	3; 6	6; 3	6^{6} 7^{8}
