= 2024 Billie Jean King Cup finals =

Part of tennis tournament

- Date: 14–20 November 2024
- Edition: 61st
- Draw: 12 teams
- Surface: Hard (Indoor)
- Location: Málaga, Spain
- Venue: Martin Carpena Arena

Champions
- Italy
- Billie Jean King Cup

Italy defeated Slovakia 2–0 in the final. The Italian team pocketed $2,400,000USD. Slovakia reached the final for the first time since 2002. Poland reached the semifinals for the first time by defeating Czechia.

The Billie Jean King Cup Finals was the highest level of the Billie Jean King Cup tennis team competition in 2024. The event took place in Málaga, Spain, from 14 to 20 November 2024. The ties were contested in a best-of-three rubbers format, played on one day, consisting of two singles where needed followed by a doubles rubber. The finals featured 12 teams competing in a knockout format, which replaced the group stage.

Canada were the defending champions, but they were eliminated in the quarterfinals by Great Britain.

== Participating teams ==
12 nations take part in the Finals. The qualification is as follows:

- 2 finalists of the 2023 Finals (Canada and Italy)
- 1 host nation (Spain)
- 1 wild card (Czech Republic)
- 8 winners of the 2024 qualifying round

Participating teams
Australia	Canada (TH)	Czech Republic (WC)	Germany	Great Britain	Italy (2023F)
Japan	Poland	Romania	Slovakia	Spain (H)	United States

=== Seeds ===
All seeds received a bye into the quarterfinals.

1. Canada (quarterfinals)
2. Czech Republic (quarterfinals)
3. Italy (champions)
4. Australia (quarterfinals)

=== Team nominations ===
SR = Singles ranking, DR = Doubles ranking. Rankings are as of 11 November 2024.

Australia
Player	SR	DR
Ajla Tomljanović	85	444
Olivia Gadecki	90	102
Kimberly Birrell	115	204
Daria Saville	120	229
Ellen Perez	–	13
Captain: Samantha Stosur

Canada
Player	SR	DR
Leylah Fernandez	31	32
Rebecca Marino	103	210
Marina Stakusic	127	559
Gabriela Dabrowski	–	3
Captain: Heidi El Tabakh

Czech Republic
Player	SR	DR
Linda Nosková	26	65
Marie Bouzková	45	49
Kateřina Siniaková	46	1
Sára Bejlek	142	–
Dominika Šalková	164	281
Captain: Petr Pála

Germany
Player	SR	DR
Laura Siegemund	84	21
Jule Niemeier	92	562
Tatjana Maria	101	1040
Eva Lys	130	–
Anna-Lena Friedsam	440	245
Captain: Rainer Schüttler

Great Britain
Player	SR	DR
Katie Boulter	24	289
Emma Raducanu	58	–
Harriet Dart	88	61
Heather Watson	140	57
Olivia Nicholls	–	39
Captain: Anne Keothavong

Italy
Player	SR	DR
Jasmine Paolini	4	10
Elisabetta Cocciaretto	54	132
Lucia Bronzetti	78	278
Sara Errani	105	8
Martina Trevisan	126	338
Captain: Tathiana Garbin

Japan
Player	SR	DR
Moyuka Uchijima	56	114
Ena Shibahara	135	41
Nao Hibino	152	122
Eri Hozumi	–	45
Shuko Aoyama	–	47
Captain: Ai Sugiyama

Poland
Player	SR	DR
Iga Świątek	2	–
Magdalena Fręch	25	613
Magda Linette	38	75
Maja Chwalińska	165	183
Katarzyna Kawa	258	93
Captain: Dawid Celt

Romania
Player	SR	DR
Jaqueline Cristian	73	219
Anca Todoni	113	295
Ana Bogdan	116	405
Elena-Gabriela Ruse	128	62
Monica Niculescu	–	33
Captain: Horia Tecău

Slovakia
Player	SR	DR
Rebecca Šramková	43	–
Anna Karolína Schmiedlová	110	1053
Viktória Hrunčáková	241	159
Renáta Jamrichová	375	–
Tereza Mihalíková	–	42
Captain: Matej Lipták

Spain
Player	SR	DR
Paula Badosa	12	179
Jéssica Bouzas Maneiro	55	1447
Nuria Párrizas Díaz	98	1138
Sara Sorribes Tormo	106	46
Marina Bassols Ribera	155	953
Captain: Anabel Medina Garrigues

United States
Player	SR	DR
Danielle Collins	11	527
Peyton Stearns	48	120
Ashlyn Krueger	65	71
Taylor Townsend	69	5
Caroline Dolehide	82	14
Captain: Lindsay Davenport

=== Bracket ===
First round
Germany	0
Great Britain	2
Slovakia	2
United States	1
Spain	0
Poland	2
Japan	2
Romania	1

Quarter-finals
1	Canada	0
Great Britain	2
4	Australia	0
Slovakia	2
2	Czech Republic	1
Poland	2
3	Italy	2
Japan	1

Semi-finals
Great Britain	1
Slovakia	2
Poland	1
3	Italy	2

Final
Slovakia	0
3	Italy	2

== Results ==
=== First round ===
==== Germany vs. Great Britain ====
Germany
0
Málaga, Spain
15 November 2024
Hard (i)

Great Britain
2

			1	2	3
1	(Germany) (United Kingdom)	Jule Niemeier; Emma Raducanu	4; 6	4; 6
2	(Germany) (United Kingdom)	Laura Siegemund; Katie Boulter	1; 6	2; 6
3	(Germany) (United Kingdom)	Anna-Lena Friedsam / Tatjana Maria; Olivia Nicholls / Heather Watson				not played

==== Slovakia vs. United States ====
Slovakia
2
Málaga, Spain
14 November 2024
Hard (i)

United States
1

			1	2	3
1	(Slovakia) (United States)	Renáta Jamrichová; Taylor Townsend	5; 7	4; 6
2	(Slovakia) (United States)	Rebecca Šramková; Danielle Collins	6; 2	7; 5
3	(Slovakia) (United States)	Viktória Hrunčáková / Tereza Mihalíková; Ashlyn Krueger / Taylor Townsend	6; 3	3; 6	[10] [8]

==== Spain vs. Poland ====
Spain
0
Málaga, Spain
15 November 2024 (Note: Tie was originally scheduled for 13 November, but was postponed due to a severe weather alert.)
Hard (i)

Poland
2

			1	2	3
1	(Spain) (Poland)	Sara Sorribes Tormo; Magda Linette	6^{6} 7^{8}	6; 2	4; 6
2	(Spain) (Poland)	Paula Badosa; Iga Świątek	3; 6	7^{7} 6^{5}	1; 6
3	(Spain) (Poland)	Marina Bassols Ribera / Jéssica Bouzas Maneiro; Magdalena Fręch / Katarzyna Kawa				not played

==== Japan vs. Romania ====
Japan
2
Málaga, Spain
14 November 2024
Hard (i)

Romania
1

			1	2	3
1	(Japan) (Romania)	Nao Hibino; Ana Bogdan	2; 6	4; 6
2	(Japan) (Romania)	Ena Shibahara; Jaqueline Cristian	6; 4	7^{7} 6^{2}
3	(Japan) (Romania)	Shuko Aoyama / Eri Hozumi; Monica Niculescu / Elena-Gabriela Ruse	6; 1	7; 5

=== Quarterfinals ===
==== Canada vs. Great Britain ====
Canada
0
Málaga, Spain
17 November 2024
Hard (i)

Great Britain
2

			1	2	3
1	(Canada) (United Kingdom)	Rebecca Marino; Emma Raducanu	0; 6	5; 7
2	(Canada) (United Kingdom)	Leylah Fernandez; Katie Boulter	2; 6	4; 6
3	(Canada) (United Kingdom)	Gabriela Dabrowski / Leylah Fernandez; Olivia Nicholls / Heather Watson				not played

==== Australia vs. Slovakia ====
Australia
0
Málaga, Spain
17 November 2024
Hard (i)

Slovakia
2

			1	2	3
1	(Australia) (Slovakia)	Kimberly Birrell; Viktória Hrunčáková	5; 7	7^{7} 6^{4}	3; 6
2	(Australia) (Slovakia)	Ajla Tomljanović; Rebecca Šramková	1; 6	2; 6
3	(Australia) (Slovakia)	Ellen Perez / Daria Saville; Viktória Hrunčáková / Tereza Mihalíková				not played

==== Czech Republic vs. Poland ====
Czech Republic
1
Málaga, Spain
16 November 2024
Hard (i)

Poland
2

			1	2	3
1	(Czech Republic) (Poland)	Marie Bouzková; Magdalena Fręch	6; 1	4; 6	6; 4
2	(Czech Republic) (Poland)	Linda Nosková; Iga Świątek	6^{4} 7^{7}	6; 4	5; 7
3	(Czech Republic) (Poland)	Marie Bouzková / Kateřina Siniaková; Katarzyna Kawa / Iga Świątek	2; 6	4; 6

==== Italy vs. Japan ====
Italy
2
Málaga, Spain
16 November 2024
Hard (i)

Japan
1

			1	2	3
1	(Italy) (Japan)	Elisabetta Cocciaretto; Ena Shibahara	6; 3	4; 6	4; 6
2	(Italy) (Japan)	Jasmine Paolini; Moyuka Uchijima	6; 3	6; 4
3	(Italy) (Japan)	Sara Errani / Jasmine Paolini; Shuko Aoyama / Eri Hozumi	6; 3	6; 4

=== Semifinals ===
==== Great Britain vs. Slovakia ====
Great Britain
1
Málaga, Spain
19 November 2024
Hard (i)

Slovakia
2

			1	2	3
1	(United Kingdom) (Slovakia)	Emma Raducanu; Viktória Hrunčáková	6; 4	6; 4
2	(United Kingdom) (Slovakia)	Katie Boulter; Rebecca Šramková	6; 2	4; 6	4; 6
3	(United Kingdom) (Slovakia)	Olivia Nicholls / Heather Watson; Viktória Hrunčáková / Tereza Mihalíková	2; 6	2; 6

==== Poland vs. Italy ====
Poland
1
Málaga, Spain
18 November 2024
Hard (i)

Italy
2

			1	2	3
1	(Poland) (Italy)	Magda Linette; Lucia Bronzetti	4; 6	6^{3} 7^{7}
2	(Poland) (Italy)	Iga Świątek; Jasmine Paolini	3; 6	6; 4	6; 4
3	(Poland) (Italy)	Katarzyna Kawa / Iga Świątek; Sara Errani / Jasmine Paolini	5; 7	5; 7

=== Final ===
==== Slovakia vs. Italy ====
Slovakia
0
Málaga, Spain
20 November 2024
Hard (i)

Italy
2

			1	2	3
1	(Slovakia) (Italy)	Viktória Hrunčáková; Lucia Bronzetti	2; 6	4; 6
2	(Slovakia) (Italy)	Rebecca Šramková; Jasmine Paolini	2; 6	1; 6
3	(Slovakia) (Italy)	Viktória Hrunčáková / Tereza Mihalíková; Sara Errani / Jasmine Paolini				not played
