= Bratislava Tennis Exhibition 2011 =

One-off women's tennis tournament

The Bratislava Tennis Exhibition 2011 was a one-off women's exhibition tennis tournament, held on 21 November, featuring two of the best ranked women and men's legends. It was held at the Sibamac Arena in Bratislava, Slovakia.

== Matches ==
Women's Singles
(Denmark) Caroline Wozniacki	4	6	[4]
(Slovakia) Dominika Cibulková	6	3	[10]

Mixed Doubles
(Denmark) Caroline Wozniacki (France) Henri Leconte	6
(Slovakia) Dominika Cibulková (France) Mansour Bahrami	5
