= 2018 Fed Cup World Group II =

Part of tennis tournament

The World Group II was the second highest level of Fed Cup competition in 2018. The winning nations advanced to the World Group play-offs, and the losing nations were relegated to the World Group II play-offs.

Participating teams
| Australia | Canada | Italy | Romania |
| Russia | Slovakia | Spain | Ukraine |

== Slovakia vs. Russia ==
Slovakia
4
Aegon Arena, Bratislava, Slovakia
10–11 February
Hard (indoor)

Russia
1

| | | | 1 | 2 | 3 |
|---|---|---|---|---|---|
| 1 | (Slovakia) (Russia) | Viktória Kužmová; Natalia Vikhlyantseva | 4; 6 | 2; 6 |
| 2 | (Slovakia) (Russia) | Magdaléna Rybáriková; Anna Kalinskaya | 5; 7 | 6; 3 | 6; 4 |
| 3 | (Slovakia) (Russia) | Jana Čepelová; Natalia Vikhlyantseva | 6; 4 | 6; 4 |
| 4 | (Slovakia) (Russia) | Viktória Kužmová; Anastasia Potapova | 3; 6 | 6; 3 | 6; 4 |
| 5 | (Slovakia) (Russia) | Jana Čepelová / Anna Karolína Schmiedlová; Anna Kalinskaya / Veronika Kudermetova | 6; 3 | 6; 2 |

== Australia vs. Ukraine ==
Australia
3
Canberra Tennis Centre, Canberra, Australia
10–11 February
Grass

Ukraine
2

| | | | 1 | 2 | 3 |
|---|---|---|---|---|---|
| 1 | (Australia) (Ukraine) | Ashleigh Barty; Lyudmyla Kichenok | 4; 6 | 6; 1 | 6; 4 |
| 2 | (Australia) (Ukraine) | Daria Gavrilova; Marta Kostyuk | 6^{3} 7^{7} | 3; 6 |
| 3 | (Australia) (Ukraine) | Ashleigh Barty; Marta Kostyuk | 6; 2 | 6; 3 |
| 4 | (Australia) (Ukraine) | Daria Gavrilova; Nadiia Kichenok | 6; 4 | 2; 6 | 3; 6 |
| 5 | (Australia) (Ukraine) | Ashleigh Barty / Casey Dellacqua; Lyudmyla Kichenok / Nadiia Kichenok | 6; 3 | 6; 4 |

== Romania vs. Canada ==
Romania
3
BT Arena, Cluj-Napoca, Romania
10–11 February
Hard (indoor)

Canada
1

| | | | 1 | 2 | 3 |
|---|---|---|---|---|---|---|
| 1 | (Romania) (Canada) | Sorana Cîrstea; Carol Zhao | 6; 2 | 6; 2 |
| 2 | (Romania) (Canada) | Irina-Camelia Begu; Bianca Andreescu | 6; 3 | 6^{4} 7^{7} | 6; 2 |
| 3 | (Romania) (Canada) | Irina-Camelia Begu; Katherine Sebov | 6; 2 | 6; 4 |
| 4 | (Romania) (Canada) | Sorana Cîrstea; Bianca Andreescu | | | | not played |
| 5 | (Romania) (Canada) | Ana Bogdan / Raluca Olaru; Gabriela Dabrowski / Carol Zhao | 6; 4 | 1; 6 | [6] [10] |

== Italy vs. Spain ==
Italy
3
PalaTricalle Sandro Leombroni, Chieti, Italy
10–11 February
Clay (indoor)

Spain
2

| | | | 1 | 2 | 3 |
|---|---|---|---|---|---|
| 1 | (Italy) (Spain) | Jasmine Paolini; Carla Suárez Navarro | 2; 6 | 3; 6 |
| 2 | (Italy) (Spain) | Sara Errani; Lara Arruabarrena | 6; 1 | 6; 1 |
| 3 | (Italy) (Spain) | Sara Errani; Carla Suárez Navarro | 6; 3 | 3; 6 | 6; 3 |
| 4 | (Italy) (Spain) | Deborah Chiesa; Lara Arruabarrena | 6; 4 | 2; 6 | 7^{9} 6^{7} |
| 5 | (Italy) (Spain) | Elisabetta Cocciaretto / Jasmine Paolini; Georgina García Pérez / María José Martínez Sánchez | 4; 6 | 3; 6 |
