= 1996 Fed Cup World Group play-offs =

The World Group play-offs were four ties which involved the losing nations of the World Group first round and the winning nations of the World Group II. Nations that won their play-off ties entered the 1997 World Group, while losing nations joined the 1997 World Group II.

== Austria vs. Germany ==
Austria
1
Werzer Arena, Pörtschach, Austria
13–14 July 1996
Red clay (outdoors)

Germany
4

| | | | 1 | 2 | 3 |
|---|---|---|---|---|---|
| 1 | (Austria) (Germany) | Barbara Paulus; Anke Huber | 4; 6 | 3; 6 |
| 2 | (Austria) (Germany) | Judith Wiesner; Steffi Graf | 1; 6 | 6; 3 | 2; 6 |
| 3 | (Austria) (Germany) | Barbara Schett; Steffi Graf | 3; 6 | 2; 6 |
| 4 | (Austria) (Germany) | Judith Wiesner; Anke Huber | 3; 6 | 6^{3} 7^{7} |
| 5 | (Austria) (Germany) | Barbara Schett / Melanie Schnell; Sabine Hack / Christina Singer | 6; 3 | 6; 4 |

== Czech Republic vs. Argentina ==
Czech Republic
3
Lokomotive Hall, Plzeň, Czech Republic
13–14 July 1996
Supreme carpet (indoors)

Argentina
1

| | | | 1 | 2 | 3 |
|---|---|---|---|---|---|---|
| 1 | (Czech Republic) (Argentina) | Helena Suková; Florencia Labat | 7; 5 | 6; 3 |
| 2 | (Czech Republic) (Argentina) | Jana Novotná; Mercedes Paz | 6; 1 | 6; 2 |
| 3 | (Czech Republic) (Argentina) | Ludmila Richterová; Florencia Labat | 3; 6 | | | retired |
| 4 | (Czech Republic) (Argentina) | Helena Suková; Mercedes Paz | 6^{5} 7^{7} | 6; 1 | 6; 2 |
| 5 | (Czech Republic) (Argentina) | Jana Novotná / Helena Suková; Florencia Labat / Mercedes Paz | | | | not played |

== South Africa vs. Belgium ==
South Africa
1
Free State Stadium, Bloemfontein, South Africa
13–14 July 1996
Plexipave (outdoors)

Belgium
4

| | | | 1 | 2 | 3 |
|---|---|---|---|---|---|
| 1 | (South Africa) (Belgium) | Mariaan de Swardt; Sabine Appelmans | 6; 0 | 3; 6 | 2; 6 |
| 2 | (South Africa) (Belgium) | Amanda Coetzer; Dominique Van Roost | 2; 6 | 3; 6 |
| 3 | (South Africa) (Belgium) | Amanda Coetzer; Sabine Appelmans | 3; 6 | 6; 3 | 0; 6 |
| 4 | (South Africa) (Belgium) | Mariaan de Swardt; Dominique Van Roost | 7; 5 | 6; 3 |
| 5 | (South Africa) (Belgium) | Amanda Coetzer / Mariaan de Swardt; Laurence Courtois / Nancy Feber | 2; 6 | 6; 3 | 0; 6 |

== Slovakia vs. Netherlands ==
Slovakia
2
Slovan Kerametal Tennis Club, Bratislava, Slovakia
13–14 July 1996
Red clay (outdoors)

Netherlands
3

| | | | 1 | 2 | 3 |
|---|---|---|---|---|---|
| 1 | (Slovakia) (Netherlands) | Henrieta Nagyová; Miriam Oremans | 1; 6 | 4; 6 |
| 2 | (Slovakia) (Netherlands) | Karina Habšudová; Kristie Boogert | 4; 6 | 2; 6 |
| 3 | (Slovakia) (Netherlands) | Karina Habšudová; Miriam Oremans | 6; 1 | 6; 3 |
| 4 | (Slovakia) (Netherlands) | Henrieta Nagyová; Kristie Boogert | 6; 4 | 1; 6 | 0; 6 |
| 5 | (Slovakia) (Netherlands) | Karina Habšudová / Radka Zrubáková; Manon Bollegraf / Caroline Vis | 6; 4 | 6; 3 |

== See also ==
- Fed Cup structure
