= 2019 Fed Cup World Group II =

Part of tennis tournament

The World Group II was the second highest level of Fed Cup competition in 2019. The winning nations advanced to the World Group play-offs, and the losing nations were relegated to the World Group II play-offs.

Participating teams
Canada	Italy	Japan	Latvia
Netherlands	Slovakia	Spain	Switzerland

== Switzerland vs. Italy ==
Switzerland
3
Swiss Tennis Arena, Biel/Bienne, Switzerland
9–10 February
Hard (indoor)

Italy
1

			1	2	3
1	(Switzerland) (Italy)	Belinda Bencic; Sara Errani	6; 2	7; 5
2	(Switzerland) (Italy)	Viktorija Golubic; Camila Giorgi	6; 4	2; 6	6; 4
3	(Switzerland) (Italy)	Belinda Bencic; Camila Giorgi	6; 2	6; 4
4	(Switzerland) (Italy)	Viktorija Golubic; Sara Errani				not played
5	(Switzerland) (Italy)	Timea Bacsinszky / Stefanie Vögele; Sara Errani / Martina Trevisan	6^{5} 7^{7}	6; 3	[5] [10]

== Latvia vs. Slovakia ==
Latvia
4
Arēna Rīga, Riga, Latvia
9–10 February
Hard (indoor)

Slovakia
0

			1	2	3
1	(Latvia) (Slovakia)	Jeļena Ostapenko; Rebecca Šramková	7; 5	6^{5} 7^{7}	6; 1
2	(Latvia) (Slovakia)	Anastasija Sevastova; Anna Karolína Schmiedlová	6; 4	6; 0
3	(Latvia) (Slovakia)	Anastasija Sevastova; Rebecca Šramková	6; 3	6; 2
4	(Latvia) (Slovakia)	Jeļena Ostapenko; Anna Karolína Schmiedlová				not played
5	(Latvia) (Slovakia)	Diāna Marcinkēviča / Jeļena Ostapenko; Tereza Mihalíková / Anna Karolína Schmiedlová	6; 2	6; 3

== Japan vs. Spain ==
Japan
2
Kitakyushu Sogo Gymnastic Hall, Kitakyushu, Japan
9–10 February
Hard (indoor)

Spain
3

			1	2	3
1	(Japan) (Spain)	Nao Hibino; Sara Sorribes Tormo	6; 4	6; 2
2	(Japan) (Spain)	Misaki Doi; Georgina García Pérez	2; 6	6; 4	6^{2} 7^{7}
3	(Japan) (Spain)	Kurumi Nara; Sílvia Soler Espinosa	7^{7} 6^{3}	6; 4
4	(Japan) (Spain)	Nao Hibino; Georgina García Pérez	3; 6	6; 1	1; 6
5	(Japan) (Spain)	Miyu Kato / Makoto Ninomiya; Georgina García Pérez / María José Martínez Sánchez	1; 6	3; 6

== Netherlands vs. Canada ==
Netherlands
0
Maaspoort Sports and Events, 's-Hertogenbosch, Netherlands
9–10 February
Clay (indoor)

Canada
4

			1	2	3
1	(Netherlands) (Canada)	Richèl Hogenkamp; Bianca Andreescu	4; 6	1; 6
2	(Netherlands) (Canada)	Arantxa Rus; Françoise Abanda	6^{8} 7^{10}	6; 4	4; 6
3	(Netherlands) (Canada)	Arantxa Rus; Bianca Andreescu	4; 6	2; 6
4	(Netherlands) (Canada)	Richèl Hogenkamp; Françoise Abanda				not played
5	(Netherlands) (Canada)	Bibiane Schoofs / Demi Schuurs; Gabriela Dabrowski / Rebecca Marino	6; 2	5; 7	[10] [12]
