= 2014 Fed Cup World Group play-offs =

Part of tennis tournament

The World Group play-offs were four ties which involved the losing nations of the World Group first round and the winning nations of the World Group II. Nations that won their play-off ties entered the 2015 World Group, while losing nations joined the 2015 World Group II.

Participating Teams
Argentina	Canada	France	Poland
Russia	Slovakia	Spain	United States

== Russia vs. Argentina ==
Russia
4
Adler Arena Skating Center, Sochi, Russia
19–20 April 2014
Clay (indoor)

Argentina
0

			1	2	3
1	(Russia) (Argentina)	Elena Vesnina; Paula Ormaechea	6; 3	6; 3
2	(Russia) (Argentina)	Ekaterina Makarova; María Irigoyen	7; 5	6; 1
3	(Russia) (Argentina)	Ekaterina Makarova; Paula Ormaechea	6; 1	6; 2
4	(Russia) (Argentina)	Elena Vesnina; María Irigoyen				not played
5	(Russia) (Argentina)	Valeria Solovyeva / Elena Vesnina; Victoria Bosio / Nadia Podoroska	6; 2	6; 1

== Canada vs. Slovakia ==
Canada
3
PEPS, Quebec City, Canada
19–20 April 2014
Hard (Indoor)

Slovakia
1

			1	2	3
1	(Canada) (Slovakia)	Aleksandra Wozniak; Jana Čepelová	4; 6	7; 5	7; 5
2	(Canada) (Slovakia)	Eugenie Bouchard; Kristína Kučová	7^{7} 6^{0}	2; 6	6; 1
3	(Canada) (Slovakia)	Eugenie Bouchard; Jana Čepelová	7^{8} 6^{6}	6; 3
4	(Canada) (Slovakia)	Aleksandra Wozniak; Kristína Kučová				not played
5	(Canada) (Slovakia)	Gabriela Dabrowski / Sharon Fichman; Janette Husárová / Anna Karolína Schmiedlová	4; 6	7; 5	9; 11

== United States vs. France ==
United States
2
Chaifetz Arena, St. Louis, United States
19–20 April 2014
Hard (Indoor)

France
3

			1	2	3
1	(United States) (France)	Sloane Stephens; Caroline Garcia	3; 6	2; 6
2	(United States) (France)	Madison Keys; Alizé Cornet	6^{4} 7^{7}	7^{7} 6^{4}	6; 3
3	(United States) (France)	Sloane Stephens; Virginie Razzano	6; 2	6; 4
4	(United States) (France)	Madison Keys; Caroline Garcia	4; 6	3; 6
5	(United States) (France)	Madison Keys / Sloane Stephens; Caroline Garcia / Virginie Razzano	2; 6	5; 7

== Spain vs. Poland ==
Spain
2
Barcelona Tennis Olimpic, Barcelona, Spain
19–20 April 2014
Clay (Outdoor)

Poland
3

			1	2	3
1	(Spain) (Poland)	Sílvia Soler Espinosa; Agnieszka Radwańska	2; 6	2; 6
2	(Spain) (Poland)	María Teresa Torró Flor; Urszula Radwańska	4; 6	6; 0	6; 1
3	(Spain) (Poland)	María Teresa Torró Flor; Agnieszka Radwańska	3; 6	2; 6
4	(Spain) (Poland)	Sílvia Soler Espinosa; Urszula Radwańska	6; 1	6; 3
5	(Spain) (Poland)	Anabel Medina Garrigues / Sílvia Soler Espinosa; Agnieszka Radwańska / Alicja Rosolska	4; 6	2; 6
