= 2023 Billie Jean King Cup qualifying round =

Subsection of tennis competition

The 2023 Billie Jean King Cup qualifying round was held from 14 to 16 April 2023. The nine winners of this round qualified for the 2023 Finals while the nine losers played at the 2023 Play-offs.

== Teams ==
Eighteen teams played for nine spots in the Finals, in series decided on a home and away basis.

These eighteen teams were:

- 10 teams ranked 3rd–12th in the 2022 Finals
- 8 winning teams from the 2022 Play-offs

The nine winning teams from the qualifying round played at the 2023 Finals and the nine losing teams played at the 2023 Play-offs.

#: Nations Ranking as of 16 November 2022.

Qualified teams

Seeded teams

1. Spain (#3)
2. Czech Republic (#4)
3. France (#5)
4. Canada (#6)
5. United States (#7)
6. Slovakia (#8)
7. Germany (#9)
8. Kazakhstan (#10)
9. Romania (#12)

Unseeded teams

- Italy (#13)
- Belgium (#14)
- Great Britain (#15)
- Poland (#16)
- Brazil (#17)
- Ukraine (#20)
- Mexico (#22)
- Austria (#30)
- Slovenia (#34)

== Results summary ==
Home team	Score	Away team	Location	Venue	Surface
Spain [1]	3–1	Mexico	Marbella	Club de Tenis Puente Romano	Clay
Ukraine	1–3	Czech Republic [2]	Antalya (Turkey)	Megasaray Club Belek	Clay
Great Britain	1–3	France [3]	Coventry	Coventry Building Society Arena	Hard (i)
Canada [4]	3–2	Belgium	Vancouver	Pacific Coliseum	Hard (i)
United States [5]	4–0	Austria	Delray Beach	Delray Beach Tennis Center	Hard
Slovakia [6]	2–3	Italy	Bratislava	NTC Arena	Hard (i)
Germany [7]	3–1	Brazil	Stuttgart	Porsche-Arena	Clay (i)
Kazakhstan [8]	3–1	Poland	Astana	National Tennis Centre	Clay (i)
Slovenia	3–2	Romania [9]	Koper	Sport Park Bonifika	Clay

== Results ==
=== Spain vs. Mexico ===
Spain
3
Club de Tenis Puente Romano, Marbella, Spain
14–15 April 2023
Clay

Mexico
1

			1	2	3
1	(Spain) (Mexico)	Sara Sorribes Tormo; Fernanda Contreras Gómez	6; 0	6; 0
2	(Spain) (Mexico)	Nuria Párrizas Díaz; Renata Zarazúa	6; 4	6; 3
3	(Spain) (Mexico)	Nuria Párrizas Díaz; Marcela Zacarías	6; 3	6; 0
4	(Spain) (Mexico)	Sara Sorribes Tormo; Renata Zarazúa				not played
5	(Spain) (Mexico)	Aliona Bolsova / Rebeka Masarova; Giuliana Olmos / Renata Zarazúa	6; 4	6^{5} 7^{7}	[7] [10]

Team nominations:
Spain: Nuria Párrizas Díaz, Rebeka Masarova, Sara Sorribes Tormo, Marina Bassols Ribera, Aliona Bolsova
Mexico: Fernanda Contreras Gómez, Marcela Zacarías, Renata Zarazúa, Giuliana Olmos

=== Ukraine vs. Czech Republic ===
Ukraine
1
Megasaray Club Belek, Antalya, Turkey
14–15 April 2023
Clay

Czech Republic
3

			1	2	3
1	(Ukraine) (Czech Republic)	Marta Kostyuk; Markéta Vondroušová	2; 6	1; 6
2	(Ukraine) (Czech Republic)	Katarina Zavatska; Barbora Krejčíková	4; 6	3; 6
3	(Ukraine) (Czech Republic)	Marta Kostyuk; Barbora Krejčíková	3; 6	6; 1	6; 4
4	(Ukraine) (Czech Republic)	Katarina Zavatska; Markéta Vondroušová	3; 6	4; 6
5	(Ukraine) (Czech Republic)	Lyudmyla Kichenok / Dayana Yastremska; Karolína Muchová / Linda Nosková				not played

Team nominations:
Ukraine: Marta Kostyuk, Dayana Yastremska, Katarina Zavatska, Lyudmyla Kichenok
Czech Republic: Barbora Krejčíková, Karolína Muchová, Linda Nosková, Markéta Vondroušová, Sára Bejlek

=== Great Britain vs. France ===
Great Britain
1
Coventry Building Society Arena, Coventry, Great Britain
14–15 April 2023
Hard (i)

France
3

			1	2	3
1	(United Kingdom) (France)	Katie Boulter; Caroline Garcia	7^{7} 6^{2}	6^{4} 7^{7}	6^{2} 7^{7}
2	(United Kingdom) (France)	Harriet Dart; Alizé Cornet	6^{6} 7^{8}	6^{3} 7^{7}
3	(United Kingdom) (France)	Harriet Dart; Caroline Garcia	1; 6	7^{12} 6^{10}	1; 6
4	(United Kingdom) (France)	Katie Boulter; Alizé Cornet				not played
5	(United Kingdom) (France)	Alicia Barnett / Olivia Nicholls; Clara Burel / Kristina Mladenovic	7; 5	3; 6	[11] [9]

Team nominations:
Great Britain: Harriet Dart, Katie Boulter, Heather Watson, Alicia Barnett, Olivia Nicholls
France: Caroline Garcia, Alizé Cornet, Clara Burel, Kristina Mladenovic

=== Canada vs. Belgium ===
Canada
3
Pacific Coliseum, Vancouver, Canada
14–15 April 2023
Hard (i)

Belgium
2

			1	2	3
1	(Canada) (Belgium)	Leylah Fernandez; Yanina Wickmayer	6; 0	6; 3
2	(Canada) (Belgium)	Rebecca Marino; Ysaline Bonaventure	6; 4	4; 6	4; 6
3	(Canada) (Belgium)	Leylah Fernandez; Ysaline Bonaventure	4; 6	7; 5	6; 2
4	(Canada) (Belgium)	Katherine Sebov; Greet Minnen	2; 6	6; 3	3; 6
5	(Canada) (Belgium)	Gabriela Dabrowski / Leylah Fernandez; Kirsten Flipkens / Greet Minnen	6; 1	6; 2

Team nominations:
Canada: Leylah Fernandez, Rebecca Marino, Katherine Sebov, Gabriela Dabrowski
Belgium: Ysaline Bonaventure, Greet Minnen, Yanina Wickmayer, Kirsten Flipkens

=== United States vs. Austria ===
United States
4
Delray Beach Tennis Center, Delray Beach, United States
14–15 April 2023
Hard

Austria
0

			1	2	3
1	(United States) (Austria)	Coco Gauff; Julia Grabher	6; 1	6; 3
2	(United States) (Austria)	Jessica Pegula; Sinja Kraus	6; 0	7; 5
3	(United States) (Austria)	Jessica Pegula; Julia Grabher	6; 1	6; 3
4	(United States) (Austria)	Coco Gauff; Sinja Kraus				not played
5	(United States) (Austria)	Coco Gauff / Caty McNally; Melanie Klaffner / Sinja Kraus	6; 1	6; 4

Team nominations:
United States: Jessica Pegula, Coco Gauff, Danielle Collins, Caty McNally, Sofia Kenin
Austria: Julia Grabher, Sinja Kraus, Barbara Haas, Tamira Paszek, Melanie Klaffner

=== Slovakia vs. Italy ===
Slovakia
2
NTC Arena, Bratislava, Slovakia
14–15 April 2023
Hard (i)

Italy
3

			1	2	3
1	(Slovakia) (Italy)	Anna Karolína Schmiedlová; Camila Giorgi	2; 6	3; 6
2	(Slovakia) (Italy)	Viktória Hrunčáková; Martina Trevisan	6^{9} 7^{11}	3; 6
3	(Slovakia) (Italy)	Anna Karolína Schmiedlová; Jasmine Paolini	6; 1	4; 6	6; 4
4	(Slovakia) (Italy)	Viktória Hrunčáková; Elisabetta Cocciaretto	6; 3	7^{7} 6^{2}
5	(Slovakia) (Italy)	Viktória Hrunčáková / Tereza Mihalíková; Elisabetta Cocciaretto / Martina Trevisan	4; 6	6; 4	5; 7

Team nominations:
Slovakia: Anna Karolína Schmiedlová, Viktória Hrunčáková, Renáta Jamrichová, Tereza Mihalíková
Italy: Martina Trevisan, Camila Giorgi, Elisabetta Cocciaretto, Jasmine Paolini, Lucia Bronzetti

=== Germany vs. Brazil ===
Germany
3
Porsche-Arena, Stuttgart, Germany
14–15 April 2023
Clay (i)

Brazil
1

			1	2	3
1	(Germany) (Brazil)	Anna-Lena Friedsam; Beatriz Haddad Maia	6; 3	4; 6	3; 6
2	(Germany) (Brazil)	Tatjana Maria; Laura Pigossi	6; 3	3; 6	7; 5
3	(Germany) (Brazil)	Jule Niemeier; Beatriz Haddad Maia	7^{7} 6^{3}	3; 6	6; 2
4	(Germany) (Brazil)	Anna-Lena Friedsam; Laura Pigossi	6; 1	6; 0
5	(Germany) (Brazil)	Jule Niemeier / Laura Siegemund; Beatriz Haddad Maia / Luisa Stefani				not played

Team nominations:
Germany: Jule Niemeier, Tatjana Maria, Anna-Lena Friedsam, Laura Siegemund, Eva Lys
Brazil: Beatriz Haddad Maia, Laura Pigossi, Carolina Alves, Ingrid Gamarra Martins, Luisa Stefani

=== Kazakhstan vs. Poland ===
Kazakhstan
3
National Tennis Centre, Astana, Kazakhstan
14–15 April 2023
Clay (i)

Poland
1

			1	2	3
1	(Kazakhstan) (Poland)	Yulia Putintseva; Magda Linette	7; 5	6; 3
2	(Kazakhstan) (Poland)	Elena Rybakina; Weronika Falkowska	6; 3	6; 4
3	(Kazakhstan) (Poland)	Elena Rybakina; Magda Linette	6; 4	6; 2
4	(Kazakhstan) (Poland)	Yulia Putintseva; Weronika Falkowska				not played
5	(Kazakhstan) (Poland)	Anna Danilina / Yulia Putintseva; Weronika Falkowska / Alicja Rosolska	3; 6	4; 6

Team nominations:
Kazakhstan: Elena Rybakina, Yulia Putintseva, Gozal Ainitdinova, Anna Danilina, Zhanel Rustemova
Poland: Magda Linette, Weronika Falkowska, Weronika Ewald, Alicja Rosolska

=== Slovenia vs. Romania ===
Slovenia
3
Sport Park Bonifika, Koper, Slovenia
14–16 April 2023
Clay

Romania
2

			1	2	3
1	(Slovenia) (Romania)	Kaja Juvan; Ana Bogdan	6; 3	3; 6	4; 6
2	(Slovenia) (Romania)	Tamara Zidanšek; Jaqueline Cristian	1; 6	6; 4	3; 6
3	(Slovenia) (Romania)	Tamara Zidanšek; Ana Bogdan	3; 6	7^{7} 6^{4}	7; 5
4	(Slovenia) (Romania)	Kaja Juvan; Jaqueline Cristian	6; 2	6; 4
5	(Slovenia) (Romania)	Kaja Juvan / Tamara Zidanšek; Irina Bara / Monica Niculescu	4; 6	6; 2	6; 4

Team nominations:
Slovenia: Tamara Zidanšek, Kaja Juvan, Nina Potočnik, Pia Lovrič, Ela Nala Milić
Romania: Ana Bogdan, Jaqueline Cristian, Irina Bara, Anca Todoni, Monica Niculescu
