= Anna-Lena Friedsam =

German tennis player (born 1994)

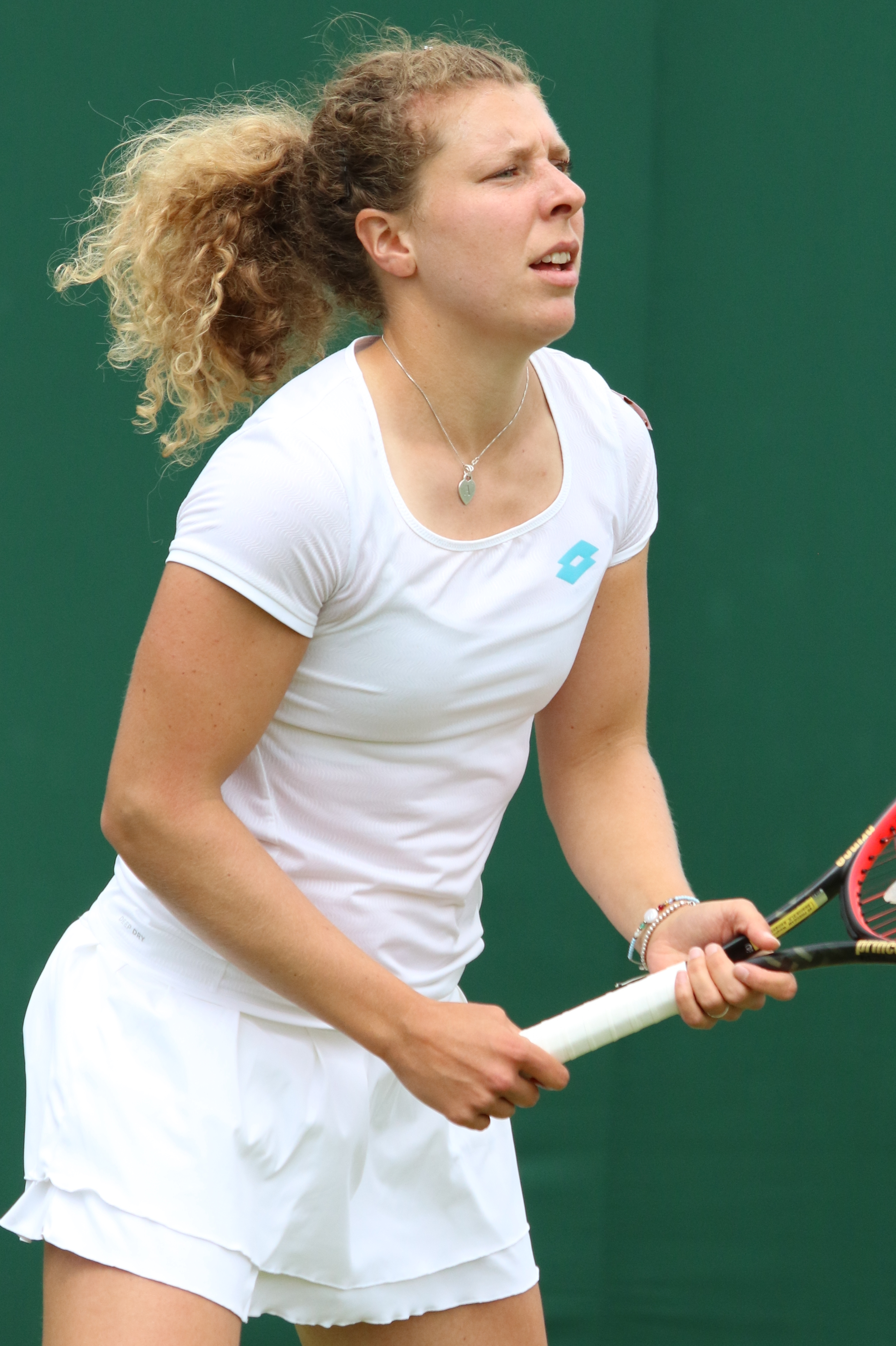
- Friedsam at the 2019 Wimbledon Championships
- Country (sports): Germany
- Born: 1 February 1994 (age 32) Neuwied, Germany
- Height: 1.74 m (5 ft 9 in)
- Plays: Right-handed (two-handed backhand)
- Prize money: US $2,767,312

Singles
- Career record: 400–273
- Career titles: 0
- Highest ranking: No. 45 (15 August 2016)
- Current ranking: No. 195 (30 March 2026)

Grand Slam singles results
- Australian Open: 4R (2016)
- French Open: 2R (2015, 2023)
- Wimbledon: 3R (2016)
- US Open: 2R (2020)

Other tournaments
- Olympic Games: 2R (2021)

Doubles
- Career record: 127–107
- Career titles: 4
- Highest ranking: No. 34 (21 September 2020)
- Current ranking: No. 398 (30 March 2026)

Grand Slam doubles results
- Australian Open: 2R (2022)
- French Open: 3R (2016, 2019)
- Wimbledon: 3R (2019)
- US Open: 3R (2019)

Other doubles tournaments
- Olympic Games: 1R (2021)

Team competitions
- BJK Cup: 1R (2024), RR (2021, 2023)
- Last updated on: 30 March 2026.

Anna-Lena Friedsam (born 1 February 1994) is a German professional tennis player. She reached her best singles ranking of world No. 45 in August 2016. In doubles, she peaked at No. 34 in September 2020. She has won four doubles titles on the WTA Tour, one WTA 125 singles title as well as 13 singles and three doubles titles on the ITF Circuit. Friedsam also reached the fourth round of a Grand Slam, at the 2016 Australian Open.

== Career ==
=== 2012 ===
Friedsam won her first $25k tournament in 2012, at the Infond Open.

=== 2015: First WTA Tour final ===
In Linz, Friedsam reached her first career singles final, losing to Anastasia Pavlyuchenkova in straight sets.

=== 2016-2018: Grand Slam fourth round, top 50 debut, extended hiatus due to surgery ===
At the 2016 Australian Open, she reached her first and so far only Grand Slam round of 16. There, she lost to Agnieszka Radwańska after a big battle and struggling with injury during the match. In the previous round, she defeated US Open finalist and top 20 player Roberta Vinci.

Shoulder pain and two surgeries in 2016 and 2017 kept Friedsam out of the game for more than two years. She came back to the WTA tour with a protected ranking at the Miami Open 2019.

=== 2020: Second WTA Tour final ===
At the 2020 Lyon Open, she reached the final but lost to Sofia Kenin. On her way to the final, she defeated two former top-10 players, Kristina Mladenovic and Daria Kasatkina, respectively.

=== 2022: Two WTA 125 finals ===
After slipping down the rankings following the Covid break in 2020, Friedsam bounced back in the second half of 2022, reaching the semifinals at Portoroz, where her run was ended by eventual champion Kateřina Siniaková. She finished the year with two WTA 125 finals at Midland and Angers, losing to Caty McNally and Alycia Parks, respectively.

=== 2023: Back to top 100 ===
At the Upper Austria Ladies Linz, Friedsam reached the quarterfinals as a qualifier defeating fellow qualifier and former top-10 player Sara Errani and fourth seed Anhelina Kalinina. She lost in the last eight to eighth seed and eventual champion Anastasia Potapova. At the same tournament, she reached her seventh final in doubles with Nadiia Kichenok.

At the inaugural edition of the ATX Open in Austin, Texas, Friedsam reached her second consecutive quarterfinal defeating lucky loser Erika Andreeva in a match lasting over three hours with a third set longest tiebreak for the season. This win marked Friedsam's return to the world top 100 for the first time since her shoulder surgery in January 2017. At the same tournament, she reached the doubles semifinals with Nadiia Kichenok, but lost to eventual champions Erin Routliffe and Aldila Sutjiadi.

== Performance timelines ==
Key
W	F	SF	QF	#R	RR	Q#	P#	DNQ	A	Z#	PO	G	S	B	NMS	NTI	P	NH

(W) winner; (F) finalist; (SF) semifinalist; (QF) quarterfinalist; (#R) rounds 4, 3, 2, 1; (RR) round-robin stage; (Q#) qualification round; (P#) preliminary round; (DNQ) did not qualify; (A) absent; (Z#) Davis/Fed Cup Zonal Group (with number indication) or (PO) play-off; (G) gold, (S) silver or (B) bronze Olympic/Paralympic medal; (NMS) not a Masters tournament; (NTI) not a Tier I tournament; (P) postponed; (NH) not held; (SR) strike rate (events won / competed); (W–L) win–loss record.
To avoid confusion and double counting, these charts are updated at the conclusion of a tournament or when the player's participation has ended.

Only WTA Tour and Grand Slam main-draw and Billie Jean King Cup results are considered in the career statistics.

=== Singles ===
Current through the 2026 WTA Tour.

Tournament	2013	2014	2015	2016	2017	2018	2019	2020	2021	2022	2023	2024	2025	2026	SR	W–L	Win%
Grand Slam tournaments
Australian Open	A	Q1	1R	4R	A	1R	A	Q1	Q1	Q1	Q2	Q1	Q2	Q1	0 / 3	3–3	50%
French Open	Q1	1R	2R	1R	A	A	A	1R	Q3	A	2R	A	Q3	Q3	0 / 5	2–5	29%
Wimbledon	Q2	1R	2R	3R	A	A	1R	NH	Q1	Q1	1R	A	A	Q1	0 / 5	3–5	38%
US Open	Q1	Q3	1R	1R	A	A	Q3	2R	Q2	Q1	1R	A	Q1	A	0 / 4	1–4	20%
Win–loss	0–0	0–2	2–4	5–4	0–0	0–1	0–1	1–2	0–0	0–0	1–3	0–0	0–0	0–0	0 / 17	9–17	35%
National representation
Olympic Games	NH			A	NH				2R	NH		A	NH		0 / 1	1–1	50%
BJK Cup	A	A	A	A	A	A	A	QR	RR	PO	RR	1R	PO	A	0 / 3	2–4	33%
WTA 1000 tournaments
Qatar Open	A	A	NTI	A	NTI	A	NTI	A	NTI	A	NTI	Q1	A	A	0 / 0	0–0	–
Indian Wells Open	A	A	Q1	2R	A	A	A	NH	A	Q1	Q2	A	A	A	0 / 1	0–1	0%
Miami Open	A	A	Q1	1R	A	A	1R	NH	Q2	Q1	1R	A	A	A	0 / 3	0–3	0%
Madrid Open	A	A	A	1R	A	A	A	NH	A	A	Q2	A	A	A	0 / 1	0–1	0%
Italian Open	A	A	A	2R	A	A	A	Q2	A	A	1R	A	A	A	0 / 2	1–2	33%
Cincinnati Open	A	A	A	A	A	A	A	Q1	A	A	A	A	A	A	0 / 0	0–0	–
China Open	A	A	A	A	A	A	A	NH			Q1	A	A	Q2	0 / 0	0–0	–
Guadalajara Open	NH									Q1	A	NTI			0 / 0	0–0	–
Win–loss	0–0	0–0	0–0	1–4	0–0	0–0	0–1	0–0	0–0	0–0	0–2	0–0	0–0	0–0	0 / 7	1–7	14%
Career statistics
Tournaments	0	10	14	14	1	2	9	4	11	3	14	0	1	1	Career total: 84		
Titles	0	0	0	0	0	0	0	0	0	0	0	0	0	0	Career total: 0		
Finals	0	0	1	0	0	0	0	1	0	0	0	0	0	0	Career total: 2		
Overall win–loss	0–0	7–10	11–14	15–14	0–1	1–2	7–9	5–4	5–11	5–3	8–16	0–1	0–2	0–1	0 / 84	64–88	42%
Year-end ranking	126	87	99	68	1025	390	145	111	133	145	115	440	192	251			

=== Doubles ===
Current through the 2026 WTA Tour.

Tournament	2013	2014	2015	2016	2017	2018	2019	2020	2021	2022	2023	2024	2025	2026	SR	W–L	Win%
Grand Slam tournaments
Australian Open	A	A	A	A	A	1R	A	1R	A	2R	A	A	A	A	0 / 3	1–3	25%
French Open	A	A	A	3R	A	A	3R	1R	2R	1R	1R	A	A	A	0 / 6	5–6	45%
Wimbledon	A	A	Q2	1R	A	A	3R	NH	2R	1R	1R	A	A	A	0 / 5	3–5	38%
US Open	A	A	A	1R	A	A	3R	2R	1R	A	A	A	A	A	0 / 4	3–4	43%
Win–loss	0–0	0–0	0–0	2–3	0–0	0–1	6–3	1–3	2–3	1–3	0–2	0–0	0–0	0–0	0 / 18	12–18	40%
National representation
Olympic Games	NH			A	NH				1R	NH		A	NH		0 / 1	0–1	0%
BJK Cup	A	A	A	A	A	A	A	QR	RR	PO	RR	1R	PO	A	0 / 3	3–5	38%
WTA 1000 tournaments
Miami Open	A	A	A	A	A	A	A	NH	2R	A	A	A	A	A	0 / 1	1–1	50%
Italian Open	A	A	A	A	A	A	A	F	A	A	A	A	A	A	0 / 1	4–1	80%
Cincinnati Open	A	A	A	A	A	A	A	1R	A	A	A	A	A	A	0 / 1	0–1	0%
Win–loss	0–0	0–0	0–0	0–0	0–0	0–0	0–0	4–2	1–1	0–0	0–0	0–0	0–0	0–0	0 / 3	5–3	63%
Career statistics
Tournaments	1	1	3	6	1	2	8	10	13	9	9	1	1	3	Career total: 68		
Titles	0	0	0	0	0	0	1	0	1	1	1	0	0	0	Career total: 4		
Finals	0	0	0	1	0	0	1	1	2	1	2	0	0	0	Career total: 8		
Overall win–loss	1–1	0–1	3–3	8–4	2–1	1–2	15–7	7–10	14–14	8–8	13–9	2–1	1–3	1–3	4 / 68	76–67	53%
Year-end ranking	368	213	244	121	449	587	45	37	92	111	114	245	574	375			

== Significant finals ==
=== WTA 1000 ===
==== Doubles: 1 (runner-up) ====
Result	Year	Tournament	Surface	Partner	Opponents	Score
Loss	2020	Italian Open	Clay	(Romania) Raluca Olaru	(Chinese Taipei) Hsieh Su-wei (Czech Republic) Barbora Strýcová	2–6, 2–6

== WTA Tour finals ==
=== Singles: 2 (2 runner-ups) ===
Legend Grand Slam WTA 1000 (Premier M & Premier 5) WTA 500 (Premier) WTA 250 (International) (0–2)	Finals by surface Hard (0–2) Clay (0–0) Grass (0–0)

Result	W–L	Date	Tournament	Tier	Surface	Opponent	Score
Loss	0–1	Oct 2015	Linz Open, Austria	International	Hard (i)	(Russia) Anastasia Pavlyuchenkova	4–6, 3–6
Loss	0–2	Mar 2020	Lyon Open, France	International	Hard (i)	(United States) Sofia Kenin	2–6, 6–4, 4–6

=== Doubles: 8 (4 titles, 4 runner-ups) ===
Legend Grand Slam WTA 1000 (Premier M & 5) (0–1) WTA 500 (Premier) (2–1) WTA 250 (International) (3–3)	Finals by surface Hard (2–1) Clay (2–2) Grass (0–1)

Result	W–L	Date	Tournament	Tier	Surface	Partner	Opponents	Score
Loss	0–1	Jun 2016	Mallorca Open, Spain	International	Grass	(Germany) Laura Siegemund	(Canada) Gabriela Dabrowski (Spain) María José Martínez Sánchez	4–6, 2–6
Win	1–1	Apr 2019	Stuttgart Open, Germany	Premier	Clay (i)	(Germany) Mona Barthel	(Russia) Anastasia Pavlyuchenkova (Czech Republic) Lucie Šafářová	2–6, 6–3, [10–6]
Loss	1–2	Sep 2020	Italian Open, Italy	Premier 5	Clay	(Romania) Raluca Olaru	(Chinese Taipei) Hsieh Su-wei (Czech Republic) Barbora Strýcová	2–6, 2–6
Loss	1–3	Apr 2021	Copa Colsanitas, Colombia	WTA 250	Clay	(Romania) Mihaela Buzărnescu	(France) Elixane Lechemia (United States) Ingrid Neel	3–6, 4–6
Win	2–3	Oct 2021	Astana Open, Kazakhstan	WTA 250	Hard (i)	(Romania) Monica Niculescu	(Russia) Angelina Gabueva (Russia) Anastasia Zakharova	6–2, 4–6, [10–5]
Win	3–3	Jul 2022	Poland Open, Poland	WTA 250	Clay	(Kazakhstan) Anna Danilina	(Poland) Katarzyna Kawa (Poland) Alicja Rosolska	6–4, 5–7, [10–5]
Loss	3–4	Feb 2023	Linz Open, Austria	WTA 250	Hard (i)	(Ukraine) Nadiia Kichenok	(Georgia (country)) Natela Dzalamidze (Slovakia) Viktória Kužmová	6–4, 5–7, [10–12]
Win	4–4	Sep 2023	Japan Open, Japan	WTA 250	Hard	(Ukraine) Nadiia Kichenok	Anna Kalinskaya (Kazakhstan) Yulia Putintseva	7–6^{(7–3)}, 6–3

== WTA Challenger finals ==
=== Singles: 4 (1 title, 3 runner-ups) ===
Result	W–L	Date	Tournament	Surface	Opponent	Score
Win	1–0	Sep 2014	Suzhou Ladies Open, China	Hard	(China) Duan Yingying	6–1, 6–3
Loss	1–1	Mar 2016	San Antonio Open, United States	Hard	(Japan) Misaki Doi	4–6, 2–6
Loss	1–2	Nov 2022	Midland Tennis Classic, United States	Hard (i)	(United States) Caty McNally	3–6, 2–6
Loss	1–3	Dec 2022	Open Angers, France	Hard (i)	(United States) Alycia Parks	4–6, 6–4, 4–6

=== Doubles: 2 (2 runner-ups) ===
Result	W–L	Date	Tournament	Surface	Partner	Opponents	Score
Loss	0–1	Nov 2013	Taipei Open, Taiwan	Carpet (i)	(Belgium) Alison Van Uytvanck	(France) Caroline Garcia (Kazakhstan) Yaroslava Shvedova	3–6, 3–6
Loss	0–2	Nov 2022	Midland Tennis Classic, United States	Hard (i)	(Ukraine) Nadiia Kichenok	(United States) Asia Muhammad (United States) Alycia Parks	2–6, 3–6

== ITF Circuit finals ==
=== Singles: 22 (14 titles, 8 runner-ups) ===
Legend $80,000 tournaments (0–1) $50,000 tournaments (3–0) $40,000 tournaments (0–1) $25,000 tournaments (8–1) $10/15,000 tournaments (3–5)	Finals by surface Hard (8–4) Clay (5–4) Grass (1–0)

Result	W–L	Date	Tournament	Tier	Surface	Opponent	Score
Loss	0–1	Apr 2011	ITF Bol, Croatia	10,000	Clay	(Italy) Evelyn Mayr	6–7^{(3–7)}, 2–6
Loss	0–2	Oct 2011	ITF Antalya, Turkey	10,000	Clay	(Romania) Diana Enache	4–6, 2–6
Loss	0–3	Nov 2011	ITF Équeurdreville, France	10,000	Hard	(Ukraine) Maryna Zanevska	4–6, 2–6
Win	1–3	Mar 2012	ITF Astana, Kazakhstan	10,000	Hard (i)	(Russia) Ekaterina Yashina	6–4, 6–3
Loss	1–4	Mar 2012	ITF Antalya, Turkey	10,000	Clay	(Slovakia) Anna Karolína Schmiedlová	6–7^{(5–7)}, 4–6
Loss	1–5	Apr 2012	ITF Antalya, Turkey	10,000	Hard	(Slovakia) Anna Karolína Schmiedlová	5–7, 2–6
Win	2–5	May 2012	ITF Velenje, Slovenia	10,000	Clay	(Italy) Agnese Zucchini	6–1, 6–3
Win	3–5	May 2012	ITF Maribor, Slovenia	25,000	Clay	(Brazil) Teliana Pereira	2–6, 7–6^{(7–1)}, 6–2
Win	4–5	Jun 2012	ITF Padova, Italy	25,000	Clay	(Italy) Corinna Dentoni	6–2, 6–2
Win	5–5	Jul 2012	ITF Aschaffenburg, Germany	25,000	Clay	(Germany) Kathrin Wörle	6–4, 2–6, 6–4
Win	6–5	Aug 2012	ITF Charleroi, Belgium	25,000	Clay	(Netherlands) Angelique van der Meet	6–4, 7–6^{(7–5)}
Win	7–5	Mar 2013	ITF Sunderland, United Kingdom	15,000	Hard (i)	(Belgium) Alison Van Uytvanck	6–2, 7–6^{(7–4)}
Win	8–5	Aug 2013	ITF Kazan, Russia	50,000	Hard	(Russia) Marta Sirotkina	6–2, 6–3
Win	9–5	Sep 2013	ITF Trabzon, Turkey	50,000	Hard	(Ukraine) Yuliya Beygelzimer	4–6, 6–3, 6–3
Win	10–5	Sep 2013	ITF Loughborough, United Kingdom	25,000	Hard (i)	(Belgium) Alison Van Uytvanck	6–3, 6–0
Win	11–5	Jun 2015	ITF Ilkley, United Kingdom	50,000	Grass	(Poland) Magda Linette	5–7, 6–3, 6–1
Win	12–5	Nov 2017	ITF Shrewsbury, United Kingdom	25,000	Hard (i)	(Netherlands) Lesley Kerkhove	6–4, 6–2
Loss	12–6	Sep 2019	ITF Roehampton, United Kingdom	25,000	Hard	(Spain) Nuria Párrizas Díaz	2-6, 7-5, 5-7
Win	13–6	Sep 2019	ITF Roehampton, United Kingdom	25,000	Hard	(Netherlands) Indy de Vroome	6–3, 6–3
Loss	13–7	Oct 2023	ITF Poitiers, France	80,000	Hard (i)	(France) Jessika Ponchet	6–3, 2–6, 6–7^{(2–7)}
Win	14–7	Jan 2025	ITF Esch-sur-Alzette, Luxembourg	25,000	Hard (i)	(United Kingdom) Emily Appleton	3–6, 6–0, 7–5
Loss	14–8	Jun 2025	ITF Troisdorf, Germany	40,000	Clay	(United States) Alexis Blokhina	3–6, 6–2, 3–6

=== Doubles: 7 (5 titles, 2 runner-ups) ===
Legend $100,000 tournaments (0–1) $50/60,000 tournaments (3–0) $25,000 tournaments (0–1) $10/15,000 tournaments (2–0)	Finals by surface Hard (4–1) Clay (1–1)

Result	W–L	Date	Tournament	Tier	Surface	Partner	Opponents	Score
Win	1–0	Feb 2012	ITF Leimen, Germany	10,000	Hard (i)	(Germany) Julia Kimmelmann	(Belgium) Elyne Boeykens (Germany) Jana Nabel	6–1, 7–6^{(7–4)}
Win	2–0	May 2012	ITF Velenje, Slovenia	10,000	Clay	(Hungary) Vanda Lukács	(Slovenia) Anja Prislan (Germany) Dejana Raickovic	7–6^{(7–3)}, 5–7, [10–4]
Loss	2–1	May 2012	ITF Maribor, Slovenia	25,000	Clay	(Denmark) Karen Barbat	(Romania) Elena Bogdan (Germany) Kathrin Wörle	2–6, 6–2, [5–10]
Win	3–1	Mar 2013	ITF Croissy-Beaubourg, France	50,000	Hard (i)	(Belgium) Alison Van Uytvanck	(France) Stéphanie Foretz (Czech Republic) Eva Hrdinová	6–3, 6–4
Loss	3–2	Jul 2014	ITF Astana, Kazakhstan	100,000	Hard	(Belgium) Michaela Boev	(Russia) Vitalia Diatchenko (Russia) Margarita Gasparyan	4–6, 1–6
Win	4–2	Oct 2024	ITF Poitiers, France	60,000	Hard (i)	(Switzerland) Céline Naef	(Poland) Martyna Kubka (Switzerland) Conny Perrin	6–4, 6–1
Win	5–2	Mar 2026	ITF Maribor, Slovenia	60,000	Hard (i)	(Czech Republic) Gabriela Knutson	(France) Jessika Ponchet (Czech Republic) Anna Sisková	4–6, 6–4, [10–6]

== Top 10 wins ==
#	Player	Rank	Event	Surface	Rd	Score	Rank
2019
1.	(Switzerland) Belinda Bencic	No. 10	Linz Open, Austria	Hard (i)	1R	6–4, 2–6, 6–2	No. 166
