= 2020–21 Billie Jean King Cup finals =

Part of tennis tournament

2021 Billie Jean King Cup finals
- Date: November 1–6, 2021
- Edition: 58th
- Surface: Hard (Indoor)
- Location: Prague, Czech Republic
- Venue: O_{2} Arena

Champions
- Russian Tennis Federation
- Billie Jean King Cup

The finals, formerly known as World Group, is the highest level of Billie Jean King Cup competition in 2020–21. It was originally scheduled to be played on indoor clay courts at the László Papp Budapest Sports Arena in Budapest, Hungary, from 14 until 19 April 2020, but was postponed due to COVID-19. The new venue was established to be the O2 Arena, in Prague, on indoor hard (Rebound Ace) court. The ties were contested in a best-of-three rubbers format and are played on one day. There were two singles matches, followed by a single doubles tie.

France were the defending champions, but were eliminated in the round-robin stage, losing both their ties.

The Russian Tennis Federation won the title, defeating Switzerland in the final, 2–0.

== Participating teams ==
12 nations took part in the finals. The qualification was as follows:

- 2 finalists of the previous edition
- 1 host nation
- 1 wild card
- 8 winners of a qualifier round, in February 2020

Participating teams
Australia	Belarus	Belgium	Canada (WC)	Czech Republic (H)	France (TH)
Germany	RTF	Slovakia	Spain	Switzerland	United States

1. In accordance with the ban by the World Anti-Doping Agency (WADA) and a December 2020 decision by the Court of Arbitration for Sport (CAS), the team from RTF was not permitted to use the Russian name, flag, or anthem; it participated in the 2021 Billie Jean King Cup finals as the team of the Russian Tennis Federation (RTF), and used the flag of the RTF.

== Team nominations ==
SR = Singles ranking, DR = Doubles ranking. Rankings are as of 1 November 2021.

Australia
Player	SR	DR
Ajla Tomljanović	43	140
Storm Sanders	131	33
Ellen Perez	200	43
Olivia Gadecki	232	180
Daria Gavrilova	412	559
Captain: Alicia Molik

Belarus
Player	SR	DR
Aliaksandra Sasnovich	88	79
Yuliya Hatouka	192	495
Iryna Shymanovich	263	311
Vera Lapko	356	238
Lidziya Marozava	–	90
Captain: Tatiana Poutchek

Belgium
Player	SR	DR
Elise Mertens	18	1
Greet Minnen	70	81
Ysaline Bonaventure	146	395
Kirsten Flipkens	160	148
Captain: Johan Van Herck

Canada
Player	SR	DR
Rebecca Marino	148	175
Carol Zhao	328	570
Françoise Abanda	353	–
Gabriela Dabrowski	710	5
Captain: Sylvain Bruneau

Czech Republic
Player	SR	DR
Barbora Krejčíková	3	3
Markéta Vondroušová	35	66
Tereza Martincová	48	188
Kateřina Siniaková	49	2
Lucie Hradecká	557	29
Captain: Petr Pála

France
Player	SR	DR
Alizé Cornet	59	281
Caroline Garcia	75	170
Clara Burel	77	268
Fiona Ferro	105	410
Captain: Julien Benneteau

Germany
Player	SR	DR
Angelique Kerber	9	379
Andrea Petkovic	76	135
Jule Niemeier	134	–
Anna-Lena Friedsam	137	93
Nastasja Schunk	297	1319
Captain: Rainer Schüttler

RTF
Player	SR	DR
Anastasia Pavlyuchenkova	12	108
Daria Kasatkina	28	284
Veronika Kudermetova	31	11
Ekaterina Alexandrova	32	146
Liudmila Samsonova	40	1342
Captain: Igor Andreev

Slovakia
Player	SR	DR
Anna Karolína Schmiedlová	83	621
Kristína Kučová	111	–
Rebecca Šramková	172	491
Viktória Kužmová	175	59
Tereza Mihalíková	618	111
Captain: Matej Lipták

Spain
Player	SR	DR
Sara Sorribes Tormo	37	69
Nuria Párrizas Díaz	66	359
Aliona Bolsova	163	86
Rebeka Masarova	167	270
Carla Suárez Navarro	330	1103
Captain: Anabel Medina Garrigues

Switzerland
Player	SR	DR
Belinda Bencic	17	155
Jil Teichmann	39	106
Viktorija Golubic	45	145
Stefanie Vögele	116	964
Captain: Heinz Günthardt

United States
Player	SR	DR
Danielle Collins	30	492
Shelby Rogers	42	74
Sloane Stephens	63	1085
CoCo Vandeweghe	151	156
Caroline Dolehide	197	28
Captain: Kathy Rinaldi

== Format ==
The 12 teams are divided in four round robin groups of three teams each. The four group winners will qualify for the semifinals.

Day	Round	Number of teams
1–4 November	Round robin	12 (4 groups of 3 teams)
5 November	Semifinals	4
6 November	Final	2

== Group stage ==
Qualified for the Knockout stage

=== Overview ===
T = Ties, M = Matches, S = Sets

Group	Winners				Runners-up				Third			
Group	Nation	T	M	S	Nation	T	M	S	Nation	T	M	S
A	RTF	2–0	5–1	11–4	Canada	1–1	2–4	5–9	France	0–2	2–4	6–9
B	Australia	2–0	4–2	8–7	Belgium	1–1	3–3	8–7	Belarus	0–2	2–4	6–8
C	United States	1–1	3–3	7–6	Slovakia	1–1	3–3	8–8	Spain	1–1	3–3	7–8
D	Switzerland	2–0	5–1	10–3	Czech Republic	1–1	3–3	7–7	Germany	0–2	1–5	4–11

=== Group A ===
Pos.	Country	Ties	Matches	Sets	Sets %	Games	Games %
1	RTF	2–0	5–1	11–4	73%	82–51	62%
2	Canada	1–1	2–4	5–9	36%	59–76	44%
3	France	0–2	2–4	6–9	40%	67–81	45%

==== France vs. Canada ====
France
1
O2 Arena, Prague, Czech Republic
1 November 2021
Hard (i)

Canada
2

			1	2	3
1	(France) (Canada)	Fiona Ferro; Françoise Abanda	6; 4	4; 6	4; 6
2	(France) (Canada)	Alizé Cornet; Rebecca Marino	6; 4	7^{7} 6^{5}
3	(France) (Canada)	Clara Burel / Alizé Cornet; Gabriela Dabrowski / Rebecca Marino	3; 6	6^{6} 7^{8}

==== RTF vs. Canada ====
Russia
3
O2 Arena, Prague, Czech Republic
2 November 2021
Hard (i)

Canada
0

			1	2	3
1	(Russia) (Canada)	Daria Kasatkina; Carol Zhao	6; 3	6; 1
2	(Russia) (Canada)	Anastasia Pavlyuchenkova; Rebecca Marino	6; 4	4; 6	6; 2
3	(Russia) (Canada)	Veronika Kudermetova / Liudmila Samsonova; Gabriela Dabrowski / Rebecca Marino	6; 3	6; 1

==== France vs. RTF ====
France
1
O2 Arena, Prague, Czech Republic
3 November 2021
Hard (i)

Russia
2

			1	2	3
1	(France) (Russia)	Clara Burel; Ekaterina Alexandrova	3; 6	6; 4	6; 3
2	(France) (Russia)	Alizé Cornet; Anastasia Pavlyuchenkova	7; 5	4; 6	2; 6
3	(France) (Russia)	Clara Burel / Alizé Cornet; Veronika Kudermetova / Liudmila Samsonova	2; 6	1; 6

=== Group B ===
Pos.	Country	Ties	Matches	Sets	Sets %	Games	Games %
1	Australia	2–0	4–2	8–7	63%	71–67	51%
2	Belgium	1–1	3–3	8–7	53%	73–61	54%
3	Belarus	0–2	2–4	6–8	43%	55–71	44%

==== Belarus vs. Belgium ====
Belarus
1
O2 Arena, Prague, Czech Republic
1 November 2021
Hard (i)

Belgium
2

			1	2	3
1	(Belarus) (Belgium)	Iryna Shymanovich; Greet Minnen	2; 6	2; 6
2	(Belarus) (Belgium)	Aliaksandra Sasnovich; Elise Mertens	2; 6	6; 4	2; 6
3	(Belarus) (Belgium)	Vera Lapko / Aliaksandra Sasnovich; Kirsten Flipkens / Elise Mertens	6; 4	6; 3

==== Australia vs. Belgium ====
Australia
2
O2 Arena, Prague, Czech Republic
2 November 2021
Hard (i)

Belgium
1

			1	2	3
1	(Australia) (Belgium)	Daria Gavrilova; Greet Minnen	6; 4	1; 6	6; 4
2	(Australia) (Belgium)	Storm Sanders; Elise Mertens	3; 6	7^{7} 6^{5}	6; 0
3	(Australia) (Belgium)	Ellen Perez / Storm Sanders; Elise Mertens / Greet Minnen	2; 6	4; 6

==== Australia vs. Belarus ====
Australia
2
O2 Arena, Prague, Czech Republic
4 November 2021
Hard (i)

Belarus
1

			1	2	3
1	(Australia) (Belarus)	Storm Sanders; Yuliya Hatouka	6; 3	6; 3
2	(Australia) (Belarus)	Ajla Tomljanović; Aliaksandra Sasnovich	4; 6	6; 2	6; 3
3	(Australia) (Belarus)	Olivia Gadecki / Ellen Perez; Lidziya Marozava / Aliaksandra Sasnovich	4; 6	4; 6

=== Group C ===
Pos.	Country	Ties	Matches	Sets	Sets %	Games	Games %
1	United States	1–1	3–3	7–6	54%	60–51	54%
2	Slovakia	1–1	3–3	8–8	50%	64–66	49%
3	Spain	1–1	3–3	7–8	47%	58–65	47%

==== Spain vs. Slovakia ====
Spain
2
O2 Arena, Prague, Czech Republic
1 November 2021
Hard (i)

Slovakia
1

			1	2	3
1	(Spain) (Slovakia)	Carla Suárez Navarro; Viktória Kužmová	2; 6	6; 3	3; 6
2	(Spain) (Slovakia)	Sara Sorribes Tormo; Anna Karolína Schmiedlová	6; 3	3; 6	6; 2
3	(Spain) (Slovakia)	Sara Sorribes Tormo / Carla Suárez Navarro; Viktória Kužmová / Tereza Mihalíková	4; 6	6; 2	10; 7

==== United States vs. Slovakia ====
United States
1
O2 Arena, Prague, Czech Republic
2 November 2021
Hard (i)

Slovakia
2

			1	2	3
1	(United States) (Slovakia)	Shelby Rogers; Viktória Kužmová	4; 6	4; 6
2	(United States) (Slovakia)	Danielle Collins; Anna Karolína Schmiedlová	6; 3	6; 2
3	(United States) (Slovakia)	Caroline Dolehide / CoCo Vandeweghe; Viktória Kužmová / Tereza Mihalíková	2; 6	7^{7} 6^{5}	10; 12

==== United States vs. Spain ====
United States
2
O2 Arena, Prague, Czech Republic
3 November 2021
Hard (i)

Spain
1

			1	2	3
1	(United States) (Spain)	Sloane Stephens; Nuria Párrizas Díaz	6; 4	6; 4
2	(United States) (Spain)	Danielle Collins; Sara Sorribes Tormo	6; 1	6; 0
3	(United States) (Spain)	Caroline Dolehide / CoCo Vandeweghe; Aliona Bolsova / Rebeka Masarova	3; 6	4; 6

=== Group D ===
Pos.	Country	Ties	Matches	Sets	Sets %	Games	Games %
1	Switzerland	2–0	5–1	10–3	77%	73–51	59%
2	Czech Republic	1–1	3–3	7–7	50%	64–64	50%
3	Germany	0–2	1–5	4–11	27%	56–78	42%

==== Czech Republic vs. Germany ====
Czech Republic
2
O2 Arena, Prague, Czech Republic
1 November 2021
Hard (i)

Germany
1

			1	2	3
1	(Czech Republic) (Germany)	Markéta Vondroušová; Andrea Petkovic	6; 1	6; 3
2	(Czech Republic) (Germany)	Barbora Krejčíková; Angelique Kerber	7^{7} 6^{5}	0; 6	4; 6
3	(Czech Republic) (Germany)	Lucie Hradecká / Kateřina Siniaková; Anna-Lena Friedsam / Jule Niemeier	6; 4	6^{2} 7^{7}	10; 8

==== Germany vs. Switzerland ====
Germany
0
O2 Arena, Prague, Czech Republic
2 November 2021
Hard (i)

Switzerland
3

			1	2	3
1	(Germany) (Switzerland)	Andrea Petkovic; Viktorija Golubic	4; 6	5; 7
2	(Germany) (Switzerland)	Angelique Kerber; Belinda Bencic	7; 5	2; 6	2; 6
3	(Germany) (Switzerland)	Anna-Lena Friedsam / Nastasja Schunk; Viktorija Golubic / Jil Teichmann	1; 6	2; 6

==== Czech Republic vs. Switzerland ====
Czech Republic
1
O2 Arena, Prague, Czech Republic
4 November 2021
Hard (i)

Switzerland
2

			1	2	3
1	(Czech Republic) (Switzerland)	Markéta Vondroušová; Viktorija Golubic	6; 4	6; 2
2	(Czech Republic) (Switzerland)	Barbora Krejčíková; Belinda Bencic	6^{2} 7^{7}	4; 6
3	(Czech Republic) (Switzerland)	Lucie Hradecká / Kateřina Siniaková; Belinda Bencic / Jil Teichmann	3; 6	3; 6

== Knockout stage ==
=== Bracket ===
Semifinals
RTF	2
United States	1
Australia	0
Switzerland	2

Final
RTF	2
Switzerland	0

=== Semifinals ===
==== RTF vs. United States ====
Russia
2
O2 Arena, Prague, Czech Republic
5 November 2021
Hard (i)

United States
1

			1	2	3
1	(Russia) (United States)	Liudmila Samsonova; Sloane Stephens	1; 6	6; 4	6; 3
2	(Russia) (United States)	Anastasia Pavlyuchenkova; Danielle Collins	7^{11} 6^{9}	6^{2} 7^{7}	2; 6
3	(Russia) (United States)	Veronika Kudermetova / Liudmila Samsonova; Shelby Rogers / CoCo Vandeweghe	6; 3	6; 3

==== Australia vs. Switzerland ====
Australia
0
O2 Arena, Prague, Czech Republic
5 November 2021
Hard (i)

Switzerland
2

			1	2	3
1	(Australia) (Switzerland)	Storm Sanders; Jil Teichmann	0; 6	3; 6
2	(Australia) (Switzerland)	Ajla Tomljanović; Belinda Bencic	3; 6	2; 6
3	(Australia) (Switzerland)	Ellen Perez / Storm Sanders; Viktorija Golubic / Stefanie Vögele				not played

=== Final ===
==== RTF vs. Switzerland ====
Russia
2
O2 Arena, Prague, Czech Republic
6 November 2021
Hard (i)

Switzerland
0

			1	2	3
1	(Russia) (Switzerland)	Daria Kasatkina; Jil Teichmann	6; 2	6; 4
2	(Russia) (Switzerland)	Liudmila Samsonova; Belinda Bencic	3; 6	6; 3	6; 4
3	(Russia) (Switzerland)	Ekaterina Alexandrova / Daria Kasatkina; Viktorija Golubic / Stefanie Vögele				not played
