= Spain Billie Jean King Cup team =

Spanish national women's tennis team

Spain
- Captain: Carla Suárez Navarro
- Nations Ranking: 13 ▼3 (24 April 2017)
- Colors: red & white
- First year: 1972
- Years played: 46
- Ties played (W–L): 130 (78–52)
- Years in World Group: 37 (59–29)
- Titles: 5 (1991, 1993, 1994, 1995, 1998)
- Runners-up: 6 (1989, 1992, 1996, 2000, 2002, 2008)
- Most total wins: Arantxa Sánchez Vicario (72–28)
- Most singles wins: Arantxa Sánchez Vicario (50–22)
- Most doubles wins: Arantxa Sánchez Vicario (22–6)
- Best doubles team: Arantxa Sánchez Vicario / Conchita Martínez (18–3)
- Most ties played: Arantxa Sánchez Vicario (58)
- Most years played: Arantxa Sánchez Vicario (16)

The Spain women's national tennis team represents Spain in Fed Cup tennis competition and are governed by the Real Federación Española de Tenis. They currently compete in World Group II. The team Captain, as of 2018, is former professional player Anabel Medina Garrigues.

== Current team ==
- Paula Badosa
- Jéssica Bouzas Maneiro
- Cristina Bucșa
- Nuria Párrizas Díaz
- Sara Sorribes Tormo

== History ==
Spain competed in its first Fed Cup in 1972. They have won the Cup five times, and finished as runners-up six times.

== Results ==
=== 2010s ===
Year	Competition	Date	Location	Opponent	Score	Result
2010	World Group II	5–6 February	Adelaide, Australia	Australia	2–3	Lost
2010	World Group II, Play-offs	24–25 April	Sopot, Poland	Poland	4–1	Won
2011	World Group II	5–6 February	Tallinn, Estonia	Estonia	4–1	Won
2011	World Group, Play-offs	16–17 April	Lleida, Spain	France	4–1	Won
2012	World Group, First round	4–5 February	Moscow, Russia	Russia	2–3	Lost
2012	World Group, Play-offs	21–22 April	Marbella, Spain	Slovakia	2–3	Lost
2013	World Group II	9–10 February	Alicante, Spain	Ukraine	3–1	Won
2013	World Group, Play-offs	20–21 April	Barcelona, Spain	Japan	4–0	Won
2014	World Group	8–9 February	Seville, Spain	Czech Republic	2–3	Lost
2014	World Group, Play-offs	19–20 April	Barcelona, Spain	Poland	2–3	Lost
2015	World Group II	7–8 February	Galați, Romania	Romania	2–3	Lost
2015	World Group II, Play-offs	18–19 April	Buenos Aires, Argentina	Argentina	4–0	Won
2016	World Group II	6–7 February	Kraljevo, Serbia	Serbia	4–0	Won
2016	World Group, Play-offs	16–17 April	Lleida, Spain	Italy	4–0	Won
2017	World Group, First round	11–12 February	Ostrava, Czech Republic	Czech Republic	2–3	Lost
2017	World Group, Play-offs	22–23 April	Roanne, France	France	0–4	Lost
2018	World Group II	10–11 February	Chieti, Italy	Italy	2–3	Lost
2018	World Group II, Play-offs	21–22 April	Cartagena, Spain	Paraguay	3–1	Won
2019	World Group II	9–10 February	Kitakyushu, Japan	Japan	3–2	Won
2019	World Group, Play-offs	20–21 April	Kortrijk, Belgium	Belgium	3–2	Won

=== 2020s ===
Year	Competition	Date	Location	Opponent	Score	Result
2020–21	Finals, Qualifying round	7–8 February 2020	Cartagena, Spain	Japan	3–1	Won
2020–21	Finals, Group stage	1 November 2021	Prague, Czech Republic	Slovakia	2–1	Won
2020–21	Finals, Group stage	3 November 2021	Prague, Czech Republic	United States	1–2	Lost
2022	Finals, Qualifying round	15–16 April	's-Hertogenbosch, Netherlands	Netherlands	4–0	Won
2022	Finals, Group stage	9 November	Glasgow, Scotland	Kazakhstan	3–0	Won
2022	Finals, Group stage	10 November	Glasgow, Scotland	Great Britain	0–3	Lost
2023	Finals, Qualifying round	14–15 April	Marbella, Spain	Mexico	3–1	Won
2023	Finals, Group stage	8 November	Seville, Spain	Canada	0–3	Lost
2023	Finals, Group stage	10 November	Seville, Spain	Poland	2–1	Won
2024	Finals, First round	15 November	Málaga, Spain	Poland	0–2	Lost
2025	Finals, Qualifying round	11 April	Ostrava, Czech Republic	Brazil	3–0	Won
2025	Finals, Qualifying round	12 April	Ostrava, Czech Republic	Czech Republic	2–1	Won
2025	Finals, Quarterfinals	17 September	Shenzhen, China	Ukraine	0–2	Lost
2026	Finals, Qualifying round	10–11 April	Portorož, Slovenia	Slovenia	3–1	Won
2026	Finals, Quarterfinals	23 September	Shenzhen, China	Kazakhstan	2–1	Won
2026	Finals, Semifinals	25 September	Shenzhen, China	Czech Republic	0–2	Lost

== See also ==
- Billie Jean King Cup
- Spain Davis Cup team
- Spain at the Hopman Cup
- Royal Spanish Tennis Federation
