= 2023 Billie Jean King Cup finals =

Part of tennis tournament

- Date: 7–12 November 2023
- Edition: 60th
- Draw: 12 teams
- Surface: Hard (Indoor)
- Location: Seville, Spain
- Venue: Estadio de La Cartuja

Champions
- Canada
- Billie Jean King Cup

Canada defeated Italy in the final, 2–0, in capturing the 2023 Billie Jean King Cup. This was Canada's first final and title at the Billie Jean King Cup. Switzerland was the defending champion, but was eliminated in the round-robin stage, losing both their ties.

The Billie Jean King Cup finals was the highest level of the Billie Jean King Cup international tennis team competition in 2023. The event took place in Seville, Spain, from 7 to 12 November 2023. The ties were contested in a best-of-three rubbers format and played on one day. There were two singles followed by a doubles. The finals featured 12 teams.

== Bracket ==
Semifinals
Czech Republic	1
Canada	2
Italy	2
Slovenia	0

Final
Canada	2
Italy	0

== Participating teams ==
12 nations take part in the finals. The qualification was as follows:

- 2 finalists of the previous edition (Australia and Switzerland)
- 1 wild card (Poland)
- 9 winners of the qualifying round in April 2023

Participating teams
Australia (2022F)	Canada	Czech Republic	France	Germany	Italy
Kazakhstan	Poland (WC)	Slovenia	Spain (H)	Switzerland (TH)	United States

=== Seeds ===
Switzerland, the winners of the 2022 Finals, are seeded No. 1 and Australia, as runners-up, are seeded No. 2. Spain and France are also seeded based on the 2022 Billie Jean King Cup nations ranking.

1. Switzerland
2. Australia
3. Spain
4. France

== Team nominations ==
SR = Singles ranking, DR = Doubles ranking. Rankings are as of 6 November 2023.

Australia
Player	SR	DR
Kimberly Birrell	113	233
Storm Hunter	172	1
Daria Saville	206	168
Ellen Perez	500	17
Ajla Tomljanović	549	–
Captain: Alicia Molik

Canada
Player	SR	DR
Leylah Fernandez	35	20
Rebecca Marino	176	1039
Marina Stakusic	258	449
Eugenie Bouchard	273	–
Gabriela Dabrowski	–	8
Captain: Heidi El Tabakh

Czech Republic
Player	SR	DR
Markéta Vondroušová	7	44
Barbora Krejčíková	10	13
Marie Bouzková	34	23
Linda Nosková	41	198
Kateřina Siniaková	45	10
Captain: Petr Pála

France
Player	SR	DR
Caroline Garcia	20	90
Varvara Gracheva	44	903
Clara Burel	61	644
Alizé Cornet	118	317
Kristina Mladenovic	249	70
Captain: Julien Benneteau

Germany
Player	SR	DR
Tatjana Maria	57	307
Laura Siegemund	86	5
Anna-Lena Friedsam	115	114
Eva Lys	130	–
Jule Niemeier	162	425
Captain: Rainer Schüttler

Italy
Player	SR	DR
Jasmine Paolini	30	97
Martina Trevisan	43	390
Elisabetta Cocciaretto	52	508
Lucia Bronzetti	64	891
Lucrezia Stefanini	119	–
Captain: Tathiana Garbin

Kazakhstan
Player	SR	DR
Elena Rybakina	4	119
Yulia Putintseva	69	343
Zhibek Kulambayeva	515	151
Aruzhan Sagandikova	751	865
Anna Danilina	814	56
Captain: Yaroslava Shvedova

Spain
Player	SR	DR
Sara Sorribes Tormo	50	33
Rebeka Masarova	65	158
Paula Badosa	66	354
Cristina Bucșa	83	66
Marina Bassols Ribera	110	381
Captain: Anabel Medina Garrigues

Poland
Player	SR	DR
Magda Linette	24	42
Magdalena Fręch	63	388
Katarzyna Kawa	207	118
Weronika Falkowska	325	93
Martyna Kubka	395	212
Captain: Dawid Celt

Switzerland
Player	SR	DR
Belinda Bencic	17	197
Viktorija Golubic	84	146
Céline Naef	139	428
Jil Teichmann	143	136
Simona Waltert	166	397
Captain: Heinz Günthardt

Slovenia
Player	SR	DR
Tamara Zidanšek	100	351
Kaja Juvan	104	–
Veronika Erjavec	183	153
Nina Potočnik	543	656
Ela Nala Milić	1024	–
Captain: Andrej Krasevec

United States
Player	SR	DR
Sofia Kenin	33	434
Sloane Stephens	48	629
Peyton Stearns	53	101
Danielle Collins	55	84
Taylor Townsend	80	7
Captain: Kathy Rinaldi

== Format ==
The 12 teams are divided in four round robin groups of three teams each. The four group winners will qualify for the semifinals.

Day	Round	Number of teams
7–10 November	Round robin	12 (4 groups of 3 teams)
11 November	Semifinals	4
12 November	Final	2

== Group stage ==
Qualified for the Knockout stage

=== Overview ===
T = Ties, M = Matches, S = Sets

Group	Winner				Runner-up				Third			
Group	Nation	T	M	S	Nation	T	M	S	Nation	T	M	S
A	Czech Republic	2–0	5–1	10–3	United States	1–1	4–2	8–5	Switzerland	0–2	0–6	2–12
B	Slovenia	1–1	3–3	9–6	Kazakhstan	1–1	3–3	7–8	Australia	1–1	3–3	6–8
C	Canada	2–0	6–0	12–1	Spain	1–1	2–4	5–9	Poland	0–2	1–5	4–11
D	Italy	2–0	5–1	11–5	France	1–1	4–2	10–6	Germany	0–2	0–6	2–12

=== Group A ===
Pos.	Country	Ties	Matches	Sets	Sets %	Games	Games %
1	Czech Republic	2–0	5–1	10–3	77%	72–54	57%
2	United States	1–1	4–2	8–5	62%	67–59	53%
3	Switzerland	0–2	0–6	2–12	14%	61–87	41%

==== Switzerland vs. Czech Republic ====
Switzerland
0
Seville, Spain
7 November 2023
Hard (i)

Czech Republic
3

			1	2	3
1	(Switzerland) (Czech Republic)	Céline Naef; Linda Nosková	6^{2} 7^{7}	6; 4	4; 6
2	(Switzerland) (Czech Republic)	Viktorija Golubic; Marie Bouzková	4; 6	4; 6
3	(Switzerland) (Czech Republic)	Viktorija Golubic / Jil Teichmann; Barbora Krejčíková / Kateřina Siniaková	6^{3} 7^{7}	2; 6

==== Switzerland vs. United States ====
Switzerland
0
Seville, Spain
9 November 2023
Hard (i)

United States
3

			1	2	3
1	(Switzerland) (United States)	Céline Naef; Danielle Collins	6^{4} 7^{7}	1; 6
2	(Switzerland) (United States)	Viktorija Golubic; Sofia Kenin	3; 6	7^{7} 6^{1}	5; 7
3	(Switzerland) (United States)	Jil Teichmann / Simona Waltert; Sloane Stephens / Taylor Townsend	1; 6	6^{3} 7^{7}

==== Czech Republic vs. United States ====
Czech Republic
2
Seville, Spain
10 November 2023
Hard (i)

United States
1

			1	2	3
1	(Czech Republic) (United States)	Kateřina Siniaková; Danielle Collins	3; 6	2; 6
2	(Czech Republic) (United States)	Markéta Vondroušová; Sofia Kenin	6; 1	6; 1
3	(Czech Republic) (United States)	Barbora Krejčíková / Kateřina Siniaková; Danielle Collins / Taylor Townsend	6; 3	7; 5

=== Group B ===
Pos.	Country	Ties	Matches	Sets	Sets %	Games	Games %
1	Slovenia	1–1	3–3	9–6	60%	66–48	58%
2	Kazakhstan	1–1	3–3	7–8	47%	54–59	48%
3	Australia	1–1	3–3	6–8	43%	53–66	45%

==== Australia vs. Slovenia ====
Australia
1
Seville, Spain
7 November 2023
Hard (i)

Slovenia
2

			1	2	3
1	(Australia) (Slovenia)	Ajla Tomljanović; Kaja Juvan	4; 6	1; 6
2	(Australia) (Slovenia)	Daria Saville; Tamara Zidanšek	1; 6	4; 6
3	(Australia) (Slovenia)	Kimberly Birrell / Storm Hunter; Veronika Erjavec / Ela Nala Milić	7; 5	6^{2} 7^{7}	[10] [5]

==== Australia vs. Kazakhstan ====
Australia
2
Seville, Spain
9 November 2023
Hard (i)

Kazakhstan
1

			1	2	3
1	(Australia) (Kazakhstan)	Storm Hunter; Anna Danilina	7^{7} 6^{2}	6; 4
2	(Australia) (Kazakhstan)	Kimberly Birrell; Yulia Putintseva	0; 6	5; 7
3	(Australia) (Kazakhstan)	Storm Hunter / Ellen Perez; Anna Danilina / Yulia Putintseva	6; 1	4; 6	[10] [5]

==== Kazakhstan vs. Slovenia ====
Kazakhstan
2
Seville, Spain
10 November 2023
Hard (i)

Slovenia
1

			1	2	3
1	(Kazakhstan) (Slovenia)	Anna Danilina; Kaja Juvan	1; 6	0; 6
2	(Kazakhstan) (Slovenia)	Yulia Putintseva; Tamara Zidanšek	2; 6	6; 2		retired
3	(Kazakhstan) (Slovenia)	Anna Danilina / Zhibek Kulambayeva; Veronika Erjavec / Ela Nala Milić	2; 6	6; 4	[10] [7]

Note: Putintseva's retirement victory over Zidanšek was counted as a 2–6, 6–2, 6–0 win.

=== Group C ===
Pos.	Country	Ties	Matches	Sets	Sets %	Games	Games %
1	Canada	2–0	6–0	12–1	92%	80–48	63%
2	Spain	1–1	2–4	5–9	36%	58–72	45%
3	Poland	0–2	1–5	4–11	27%	57–75	43%

==== Spain vs. Canada ====
Spain
0
Seville, Spain
8 November 2023
Hard (i)

Canada
3

			1	2	3
1	(Spain) (Canada)	Rebeka Masarova; Marina Stakusic	3; 6	1; 6
2	(Spain) (Canada)	Sara Sorribes Tormo; Leylah Fernandez	6^{8} 7^{10}	6^{7} 7^{9}
3	(Spain) (Canada)	Rebeka Masarova / Sara Sorribes Tormo; Eugenie Bouchard / Gabriela Dabrowski	3; 6	5; 7

==== Canada vs. Poland ====
Canada
3
Seville, Spain
9 November 2023
Hard (i)

Poland
0

			1	2	3
1	(Canada) (Poland)	Marina Stakusic; Magdalena Fręch	4; 6	7; 5	6; 3
2	(Canada) (Poland)	Leylah Fernandez; Magda Linette	6; 2	6; 3
3	(Canada) (Poland)	Eugenie Bouchard / Gabriela Dabrowski; Weronika Falkowska / Katarzyna Kawa	6; 2	6; 3

==== Spain vs. Poland ====
Spain
2
Seville, Spain
10 November 2023
Hard (i)

Poland
1

			1	2	3
1	(Spain) (Poland)	Rebeka Masarova; Katarzyna Kawa	2; 6	6; 3	6; 2
2	(Spain) (Poland)	Sara Sorribes Tormo; Magda Linette	7^{7} 6^{5}	6; 3
3	(Spain) (Poland)	Marina Bassols Ribera / Cristina Bucșa; Katarzyna Kawa / Martyna Kubka	0; 6	7^{7} 6^{2}	[3] [10]

=== Group D ===
Pos.	Country	Ties	Matches	Sets	Sets %	Games	Games %
1	Italy	2–0	5–1	11–5	69%	79–62	56%
2	France	1–1	4–2	10–6	63%	75–61	55%
3	Germany	0–2	0–6	2–12	14%	43–74	37%

==== France vs. Italy ====
France
1
Seville, Spain
8 November 2023
Hard (i)

Italy
2

			1	2	3
1	(France) (Italy)	Alizé Cornet; Martina Trevisan	6; 2	2; 6	2; 6
2	(France) (Italy)	Caroline Garcia; Jasmine Paolini	6^{6} 7^{8}	7; 5	4; 6
3	(France) (Italy)	Caroline Garcia / Kristina Mladenovic; Elisabetta Cocciaretto / Martina Trevisan	5; 7	6; 2	[10] [6]

==== Italy vs. Germany ====
Italy
3
Seville, Spain
9 November 2023
Hard (i)

Germany
0

			1	2	3
1	(Italy) (Germany)	Martina Trevisan; Eva Lys	7^{8} 6^{6}	6; 1
2	(Italy) (Germany)	Jasmine Paolini; Anna-Lena Friedsam	6; 3	6; 2
3	(Italy) (Germany)	Lucia Bronzetti / Elisabetta Cocciaretto; Anna-Lena Friedsam / Laura Siegemund	6; 4	6^{4} 7^{7}	[11] [9]

==== France vs. Germany ====
France
3
Seville, Spain
10 November 2023
Hard (i)

Germany
0

			1	2	3
1	(France) (Germany)	Clara Burel; Jule Niemeier	6; 4	6; 3
2	(France) (Germany)	Varvara Gracheva; Tatjana Maria	0; 3			retired
3	(France) (Germany)	Caroline Garcia / Kristina Mladenovic; Jule Niemeier / Laura Siegemund	5; 7	6; 2	[10] [1]

Note: Gracheva's retirement victory over Maria was counted as a 6–3, 6–0 win.

== Knockout stage ==
=== Semifinals ===
==== Czech Republic vs. Canada ====
Czech Republic
1
Seville, Spain
11 November 2023
Hard (i)

Canada
2

			1	2	3
1	(Czech Republic) (Canada)	Barbora Krejčíková; Marina Stakusic	6; 2	6; 1
2	(Czech Republic) (Canada)	Markéta Vondroušová; Leylah Fernandez	2; 6	6; 2	3; 6
3	(Czech Republic) (Canada)	Barbora Krejčíková / Kateřina Siniaková; Gabriela Dabrowski / Leylah Fernandez	5; 7	6^{3} 7^{7}

==== Italy vs. Slovenia ====
Italy
2
Seville, Spain
11 November 2023
Hard (i)

Slovenia
0

			1	2	3
1	(Italy) (Slovenia)	Martina Trevisan; Kaja Juvan	7^{8} 6^{6}	6; 3
2	(Italy) (Slovenia)	Jasmine Paolini; Tamara Zidanšek	6; 2	4; 6	6; 3
3	(Italy) (Slovenia)	Elisabetta Cocciaretto / Martina Trevisan; Kaja Juvan / Tamara Zidanšek				not played

=== Final ===
==== Canada vs. Italy ====
Canada
2
Seville, Spain
12 November 2023
Hard (i)

Italy
0

			1	2	3
1	(Canada) (Italy)	Marina Stakusic; Martina Trevisan	7; 5	6; 3
2	(Canada) (Italy)	Leylah Fernandez; Jasmine Paolini	6; 2	6; 3
3	(Canada) (Italy)	Gabriela Dabrowski / Leylah Fernandez; Elisabetta Cocciaretto / Martina Trevisan				not played
