= Peugeot Arena =

Event location in Bratislava, Slovakia

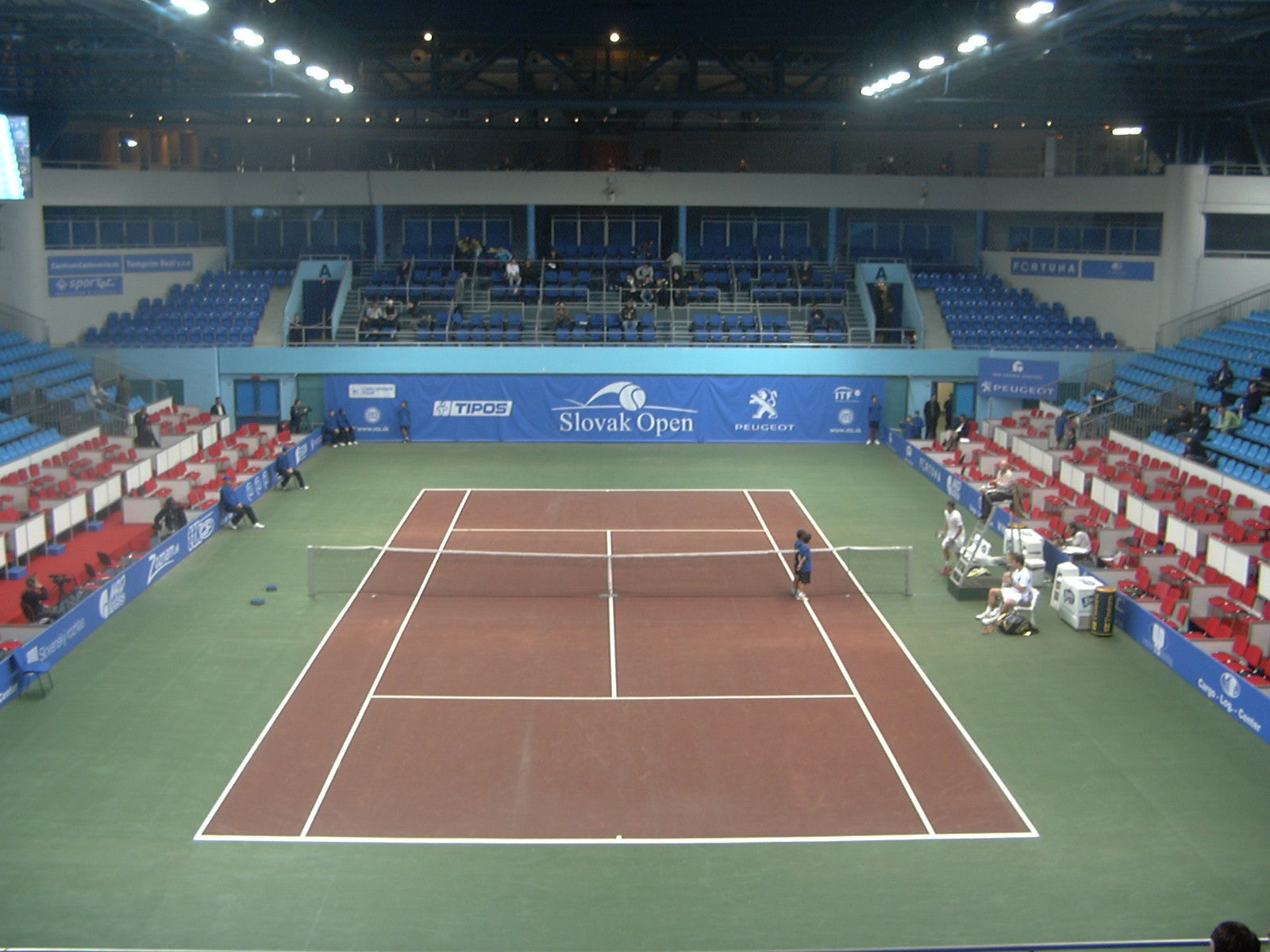
- The Peugeot Arena
- Interactive map of Peugeot Arena
- Former names: AXA National Tennis Centre Arena; Aegon Aréna; Sibamac Aréna
- Address: Príkopova 6
- Location: Bratislava, Slovakia
- Coordinates: 48°9′46″N 17°8′4″E
- Capacity: 4,000 (tennis); 6,076 (concert)

Construction
- Opened: 19 September 2003
- Cost: € 20 million ($40 million in 2025 dollars)

Peugeot aréna (formerly known as AXA Aréna NTC, Sibamac Arena and Aegon Arena for sponsorship reasons) is a multi-purpose tennis stadium part of the Slovak National Tennis Centre (Národné Tenisové Centrum) in Bratislava, Slovakia. It has a capacity of 4,500 people.

It has hosted concerts and various tennis matches, including the 2005 Davis Cup final between Slovakia and Croatia, the 2025 Billie Jean King Cup qualifying round and the Slovak Open, an annual ATP Challenger Tour event.

== Concerts ==
=== List of concerts ===
Date	Performer(s)	Reference
27 April 2012	The Prodigy	
11 June 2012	Slayer	
28 July 2012	Bryan Adams	
21 June 2013	Zucchero	
23 June 2013	Mark Knopfler	
31 May 2014	Yes (band)	
20 June 2014	Billy Idol	
28 October 2014	James Blunt	
21 April 2015	Bonnie Tyler	
10 June 2015	Faith No More	
9 June 2015	Limp Bizkit	
19 December 2015	Suzi Quatro	
30 March 2017	Dire Straits	
4 April 2017	Korn	
25 June 2017	Placebo	
26 November 2017	Helloween	
30 April 2018	Gipsy Kings	
5 June 2018	Lenny Kravitz	
13 June 2018	The Offspring	

== See also ==
- List of tennis stadiums by capacity

Preceded by Estadio Olímpico de Sevilla; Sevilla	Davis Cup; Final Venue; 2005	Succeeded by Olympic Stadium; Moscow
