= Donna Vekić career statistics =

Career finals
Discipline	Type	Won	Lost	Total
Singles	Grand Slam	–	–	–
Singles	WTA Finals	–	–	–
Singles	WTA 1000	–	–	–
Singles	WTA Tour	5	9	14
Singles	Olympics	–	1	1
Singles	Total	5	10	15
Doubles	Grand Slam	–	–	–
Doubles	WTA Finals	–	–	–
Doubles	WTA 1000	–	–	–
Doubles	WTA Tour	–	–	–
Doubles	Olympics	–	–	–
Doubles	Total	–	–	–

Donna Vekić is a Croatian tennis player, accomplished in singles. Her breakthrough came in 2019 when she reached her first quarterfinal at a Grand Slam championship, at the US Open, which brought her into the top 20 of the WTA rankings. In her prize collection, she has five WTA Tour singles titles, as well as five singles titles and one doubles title on the ITF Circuit. In addition, she has played one Premier-level tournament, the 2019 St. Petersburg Ladies' Trophy, as the biggest final of her career. She also has played in national competitions for Croatia including Fed Cup and Olympic Games. At the 2020 Tokyo Olympics, she scored her biggest match win so far, defeating world No. 3, Aryna Sabalenka, in the second round. She used to be Croatian number one a couple of times.

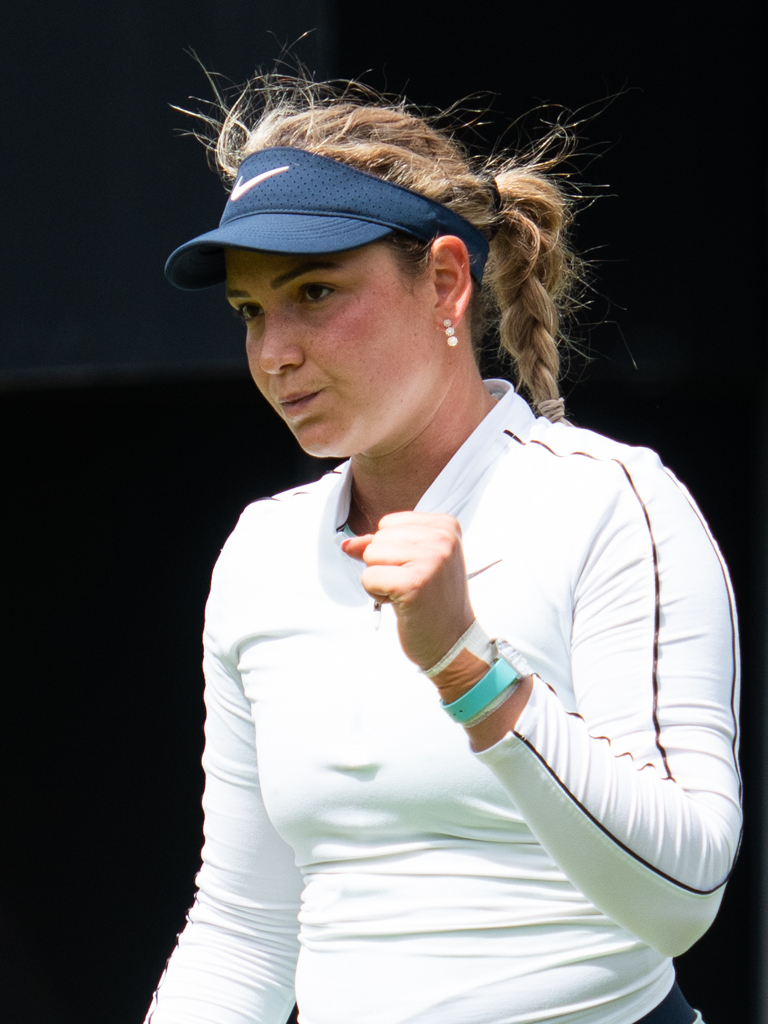
Vekić at the 2022 Birmingham Classic

== Performance timelines ==
Key
W	F	SF	QF	#R	RR	Q#	P#	DNQ	A	Z#	PO	G	S	B	NMS	NTI	P	NH

(W) winner; (F) finalist; (SF) semifinalist; (QF) quarterfinalist; (#R) rounds 4, 3, 2, 1; (RR) round-robin stage; (Q#) qualification round; (P#) preliminary round; (DNQ) did not qualify; (A) absent; (Z#) Davis/Fed Cup Zonal Group (with number indication) or (PO) play-off; (G) gold, (S) silver or (B) bronze Olympic/Paralympic medal; (NMS) not a Masters tournament; (NTI) not a Tier I tournament; (P) postponed; (NH) not held; (SR) strike rate (events won / competed); (W–L) win–loss record.
To avoid confusion and double counting, these charts are updated at the conclusion of a tournament or when the player's participation has ended.

Only main-draw results in WTA Tour, Grand Slam tournaments, Fed Cup/Billie Jean King Cup and Olympic Games are included in win–loss records.

=== Singles ===
Current through the 2026 China Open.

Tournament	2012	2013	2014	2015	2016	2017	2018	2019	2020	2021	2022	2023	2024	2025	2026	SR	W–L	Win %
Grand Slam tournaments
Australian Open	A	2R	1R	1R	1R	2R	2R	2R	3R	4R	1R	QF	1R	4R	1R	0 / 14	16–14	55%
French Open	A	1R	1R	3R	1R	1R	2R	4R	1R	1R	2R	2R	3R	2R	2R	0 / 14	12–14	46%
Wimbledon	A	1R	2R	Q2	1R	2R	4R	1R	NH	2R	1R	3R	SF	2R	1R	0 / 12	14–12	56%
US Open	Q3	2R	1R	Q2	Q3	3R	1R	QF	3R	1R	1R	1R	4R	2R	2R	0 / 12	14–12	54%
Win–loss	0–0	2–4	1–4	2–2	0–3	4–4	5–4	8–4	4–3	4–4	1–4	7–4	10–4	6–4	2–4	0 / 52	56–52	53%
Year-end championships
WTA Elite Trophy (Note: WTA Tournament of Champions was held from 2009 to 2014, when WTA Elite Trophy replaced it.)	DNQ							RR	NH			RR	NH			0 / 1	0–2	0%
National representation
Summer Olympics	A	NH			A	NH				3R	NH		S	NH		0 / 2	7–2	78%
Billie Jean King Cup (Note: Formerly known as Fed Cup until 2020.)	Z1	POZ1	Z1	POZ1	A	POZ1	A	Z1	A (Note: Edition is split into the two years due to COVID-19.)		PO	A	A	A	A	0 / 0	13–7	65%
WTA 1000
Qatar Open (Note: The first Premier 5 event of the year has switched back and forth between the Dubai Tennis Championships and the Qatar Ladies Open since 2009. Dubai was classified as a Premier 5 event from 2009 to 2011 before being succeeded by Doha for the 2012–2014 period. In 2015, Dubai regained its Premier 5 status while Doha was demoted to Premier status. The Premier 5 tournaments were reclassified as WTA 1000 tournaments in 2021.)	A	A	A	NMS	2R	NMS	1R	NMS	1R	NMS	A	NMS	1R	1R	A	0 / 5	1–5	17%
Dubai	NMS			A	NMS	A	NMS	1R	NMS	A	NMS	A	3R	1R	Q1	0 / 4	2–4	40%
Indian Wells Open	A	A	2R	2R	1R	2R	1R	2R	NH	1R	A	2R	2R	4R	2R	0 / 11	6–11	33%
Miami Open	A	2R	3R	Q1	Q2	1R	3R	3R	NH	A	A	3R	2R	2R	Q2	0 / 9	9–9	50%
Madrid Open	A	Q1	Q2	Q2	Q1	2R	2R	3R	NH	A	A	2R	2R	3R	Q1	0 / 7	7–7	54%
Italian Open	A	A	A	A	Q1	1R	2R	A	1R	A	A	4R	1R	2R	A	0 / 6	3–6	33%
Canadian Open	A	A	Q1	Q1	Q1	2R	A	2R	NH	2R	1R	1R	A	A	2R	0 / 6	3–6	38%
Cincinnati Open	A	Q1	Q1	A	2R	1R	Q2	3R	1R	Q2	Q2	3R	1R	1R	2R	0 / 8	5–8	42%
Guadalajara Open	NH										2R	A	NMS			0 / 1	1–1	50%
China Open	A	A	Q1	A	A	1R	3R	1R	NH			1R	3R	1R	3R	0 / 5	4–5	38%
Pan Pacific / Wuhan Open (Note: In 2014, the Pan Pacific Open was downgraded to a Premier event and replaced by the Wuhan Open. The Premier 5 tournaments were reclassified as WTA 1000 tournaments in 2021.)	A	A	1R	A	A	1R	2R	1R	NH				2R	1R		0 / 6	2–6	25%
Win–loss	0–0	1–1	3–3	1–1	2–3	3–8	7–7	6–8	0–3	1–2	1–2	5–8	6–9	2–4		0 / 59	38–59	39%
Career statistics
	2012	2013	2014	2015	2016	2017	2018	2019	2020	2021	2022	2023	2024	2025	2026	SR	W–L	Win %
Tournaments	1	12	19	10	16	22	24	23	11	16	13	19	22	19	8	Career total: 235		
Titles	0	0	1	0	0	1	0	0	0	1	0	1	0	0	1	Career total: 5		
Finals	1	1	1	1	0	1	1	2	0	1	1	2	2	0	1	Career total: 15		
Hard win–loss	5–2	10–10	13–17	8–9	4–10	11–17	18–15	26–18	8–9	12–11	8–8	18–12	14–11	10–16	1–4	3 / 162	166–169	50%
Clay win–loss	0–0	0–1	0–1	3–3	0–4	1–3	6–5	7–3	0–2	0–1	3–1	6–6	8–5	3–3	4–3	0 / 38	41–41	50%
Grass win–loss	0–0	5–2	1–2	0–0	0–2	6–2	7–4	4–3	0–0	4–3	3–4	7–3	11–4	2–4	5–0	2 / 35	55–33	63%
Overall win–loss	5–2	15–13	14–20	11–12	4–16	18–22	31–24	37–24	8–11	16–15	14–13	31–21	33–20	15–23	10–7	4 / 235	262–243	52%
Win (%)	71%	54%	41%	48%	20%	45%	56%	61%	42%	52%	52%	60%	62%	40%	39%	59%	Career total: 52%	
Year-end ranking (Note: 2011: WTA ranking–392.)	118	86	84	105	101	56	34	19	32	67	69	23	19	72		$6,775,891		

=== Doubles ===
Current through the 2023 Australian Open.

Tournament	2013	2014	2015	2016	2017	2018	2019	2020	2021	2022	2023	SR	W–L	Win %
Grand Slam tournaments
Australian Open	A	1R	2R	A	A	2R	1R	A	A	A	1R	0 / 5	2–5	29%
French Open	A	1R	A	A	1R	2R	A	A	A	A	A	0 / 3	1–3	25%
Wimbledon	A	1R	A	1R	1R	1R	A	A	A	A	1R	0 / 5	0–5	0%
US Open	1R	1R	A	A	1R	A	A	A	A	1R	3R	0 / 5	2–5	29%
Win–loss	0–1	0–4	1–1	0–1	0–3	2–3	0–1	0–0	0–0	0–1	2–3	0 / 18	5–18	22%
WTA 1000
Dubai / Qatar Open	A	A	A	A	A	A	A	A	A	A	A	0 / 0	0–0	–
Indian Wells Open	A	A	A	A	A	A	QF	NH	A	A	A	0 / 1	2–1	67%
Miami Open	A	A	A	A	A	A	A	NH	A	A	A	0 / 0	0–0	–
Madrid Open	A	A	A	A	A	A	A	NH	A	A	A	0 / 0	0–0	–
Italian Open	A	A	A	A	A	A	A	A	A	A	A	0 / 0	0–0	–
Canadian Open	A	A	A	A	A	A	A	NH	A	A		0 / 0	0–0	–
Cincinnati Open	A	A	A	A	1R	A	2R (Note: Withdraw during the tournament. Not counted as a loss.)	A	A	A		0 / 2	1–1	50%
Pan Pacific / Wuhan Open	A	A	A	A	2R	A	A	NH			A	0 / 1	1–1	50%
China Open	A	A	A	A	1R	A	A	NH			A	0 / 1	0–1	0%
Guadalajara Open	NH									A	A	0 / 0	0–0	–
Career statistics
Tournaments	1	5	1	1	7	5	3	1	3	3	1	Career total: 31		
Overall win–loss	0–1	0–5	1–1	0–1	1–7	3–4	3–2	1–1	2–2	0–3	0–1	0 / 31	11–28	28%
Year-end ranking	n/a	650	371	1092	374	260	224	202	391	1250	228			

== Significant finals ==
=== Summer Olympics ===
==== Singles: 1 (silver medal) ====
Result	Year	Tournament	Surface	Opponent	Score
Silver	2024	Paris Olympics, France	Clay	(China) Zheng Qinwen	2–6, 3–6

== WTA Tour finals ==
=== Singles: 15 (5 titles, 10 runner-ups) ===
Legend Olympics (0–1) WTA 1000 (–) WTA 500 (1–4) WTA 250 (4–5)	Finals by surface Hard (3–5) Clay (0–1) Grass (2–4)	Finals by setting Outdoor (4–9) Indoor (1–1)

Result	W–L	Date	Tournament	Tier	Surface	Opponent	Score
Loss	0–1	Sep 2012	Tashkent Open, Uzbekistan	International (Note: The WTA International tournaments were reclassified as WTA 250 tournaments in 2021.)	Hard	(Romania) Irina-Camelia Begu	4–6, 4–6
Loss	0–2	Jun 2013	Birmingham Classic, United Kingdom	International	Grass	(Slovakia) Daniela Hantuchová	6–7^{(5–7)}, 4–6
Win	1–2	Apr 2014	Malaysian Open, Malaysia	International	Hard	(Slovakia) Dominika Cibulková	5–7, 7–5, 7–6^{(7–4)}
Loss	1–3	Sep 2015	Tashkent Open, Uzbekistan	International	Hard	(Japan) Nao Hibino	2–6, 2–6
Win	2–3	Jun 2017	Nottingham Open, United Kingdom	International	Grass	(United Kingdom) Johanna Konta	2–6, 7–6^{(7–3)}, 7–5
Loss	2–4	Aug 2018	Washington Open, United States	International	Hard	(Russia) Svetlana Kuznetsova	6–4, 6–7^{(7–9)}, 2–6
Loss	2–5	Feb 2019	St. Petersburg Trophy, Russia	Premier (Note: The WTA Premier tournaments were reclassified as WTA 500 tournaments in 2021.)	Hard (i)	(Netherlands) Kiki Bertens	6–7^{(2–7)}, 4–6
Loss	2–6	Jun 2019	Nottingham Open, United Kingdom	International	Grass	(France) Caroline Garcia	6–2, 6–7^{(4–7)}, 6–7^{(4–7)}
Win	3–6	Oct 2021	Courmayeur Ladies Open, Italy	WTA 250	Hard (i)	(Denmark) Clara Tauson	7–6^{(7–3)}, 6–2
Loss	3–7	Oct 2022	Southern California Open, United States	WTA 500	Hard	(Poland) Iga Świątek	3–6, 6–3, 0–6
Win	4–7	Mar 2023	Monterrey Open, Mexico	WTA 250	Hard	(France) Caroline Garcia	6–4, 3–6, 7–5
Loss	4–8	Jun 2023	Berlin Open, Germany	WTA 500	Grass	(Czech Republic) Petra Kvitová	2–6, 6–7^{(6–8)}
Loss	4–9	Jun 2024	Bad Homburg Open, Germany	WTA 500	Grass	Diana Shnaider	3–6, 6–2, 3–6
Loss	4–10	Aug 2024	Paris Olympics, France	Olympics	Clay	(China) Zheng Qinwen	2–6, 3–6
Win	5–10	Jun 2026	Queen's Club Championships, United Kingdom	WTA 500	Grass	(United Kingdom) Emma Raducanu	6–0, 7–6^{(8–6)}

== WTA 125 finals ==
=== Singles: 2 (2 runner-ups) ===
Result	W–L	Date	Tournament	Surface	Opponent	Score
Loss	0–1	Jan 2026	Philippine Women's Open, Philippines	Hard	(Colombia) Camila Osorio	6–2, 3–6, 5–7
Loss	0–2	May 2026	İstanbul Open, Turkey	Clay	(Uzbekistan) Maria Timofeeva	4–6, 2–6

== ITF Circuit finals ==
=== Singles: 13 (5 titles, 8 runner–ups) ===
Legend $100,000 tournaments (1–1) $50,000 tournaments (1–0) $25,000 tournaments (2–5) $10,000 tournaments (1–2)	Finals by surface Hard (5–7) Clay (0–1)

Result	W–L	Date	Tournament	Tier	Surface	Opponent	Score
Loss	0–1	Apr 2011	ITF Hvar, Croatia	10,000	Clay	(Bosnia and Herzegovina) Ema Burgić	5–7, 6–7^{(2)}
Win	1–1	Jul 2011	ITF Chiswick, United Kingdom	10,000	Hard	(Australia) Bojana Bobusic	3–6, 6–3, 6–3
Loss	1–2	Aug 2011	ITF Westende, Belgium	10,000	Hard	(China) Lu Jiajing	4–6, 6–7^{(4)}
Loss	1–3	Oct 2011	Lagos Open, Nigeria	25,000	Hard	(Ukraine) Elina Svitolina	4–6, 3–6
Loss	1–4	Oct 2011	Lagos Open, Nigeria	25,000	Hard	(Belgium) Tamaryn Hendler	4–6, 5–7
Win	2–4	Mar 2012	ITF Bangalore, India	25,000	Hard	(Chile) Andrea Koch Benvenuto	6–2, 6–4
Loss	2–5	Apr 2012	ITF Namangan, Uzbekistan	25,000	Hard	(Russia) Olga Puchkova	6–3, 3–6, 2–6
Win	3–5	May 2012	Fergana Challenger, Uzbekistan	25,000	Hard	(Ukraine) Nadiia Kichenok	6–2, 6–2
Loss	3–6	Jul 2012	ITF Campos do Jordão, Brazil	25,000	Hard	(Argentina) María Irigoyen	5–7, 0–6
Loss	3–7	Jul 2012	ITF Wrexham, United Kingdom	25,000	Hard	(Germany) Carina Witthöft	2–6, 7–6^{(4)}, 2–6
Win	4–7	Apr 2013	Lale Cup, Istanbul, Turkey	50,000	Hard	(Russia) Elizaveta Kulichkova	6–4, 7–6^{(4)}
Loss	4–8	Sep 2016	Neva Cup, Saint Petersburg, Russia	100,000	Hard (i)	(Russia) Natalia Vikhlyantseva	1–6, 2–6
Win	5–8	Oct 2016	Soho Square Tournament, Egypt	100,000	Hard	(Spain) Sara Sorribes Tormo	6–2, 6–7^{(7)}, 6–3

=== Doubles: 1 (title) ===
Legend $10,000 tournaments (1–0)

Result	W–L	Date	Tournament	Tier	Surface	Partner	Opponents	Score
Win	1–0	Aug 2011	ITF Westende, Belgium	10,000	Hard	(United Kingdom) Alexandra Walker	(Belgium) Anouk Delefortrie (Belgium) Déborah Kerfs	6–4, 6–3

== National representation ==
=== Billie Jean King Cup ===
Current in 2022.

Group membership Zone Group (16–9)	Matches by surface Hard (11–8) Clay (5–0)	Matches by type Singles (13–7) Doubles (3–1)	Matches by location Europe (16–8) Away (0–0)

==== Singles (13–7) ====
Edition	Stage	Date	Location	Against	Surface	Opponent	W/L	Score
2012	Z1 R/R	Feb 2012	Eilat (ISR)	Poland	Hard	Urszula Radwańska	L	3–6, 3–6
2012	Z1 P/O	Feb 2012	Eilat (ISR)	(Bosnia and Herzegovina) Bosnia&Herzegovina	Hard	Anita Husarić	W	6–2, 6–0
2013	Z1 R/R	Feb 2013	Eilat (ISR)	Austria	Hard	Yvonne Meusburger	W	6–1, 6–3
2013	Z1 R/R	Feb 2013	Eilat (ISR)	(Georgia (country)) Georgia	Hard	Margalita Chakhnashvili	W	6–0, 6–1
2013	Z1 R/R	Feb 2013	Eilat (ISR)	Belarus	Hard	Ilona Kremen	W	6–1, 7–6^{(7–2)}
2013	Z1 P/O	Feb 2013	Eilat (ISR)	Poland	Hard	Agnieszka Radwańska	L	3–6, 2–6
2014	Z1 R/R	Feb 2014	Budapest (HUN)	Netherlands	Hard (i)	Kiki Bertens	L	2–6, 4–6
2014	Z1 R/R	Feb 2014	Budapest (HUN)	Luxembourg	Hard (i)	Anne Kremer	W	6–1, 6–2
2014	Z1 R/R	Feb 2014	Budapest (HUN)	Belgium	Hard (i)	Yanina Wickmayer	L	3–6, 2–6
2014	Z1 P/O	Feb 2014	Budapest (HUN)	Turkey	Hard (i)	Melis Sezer	W	6–2, 6–1
2015	Z1 R/R	Feb 2015	Budapest (HUN)	Israel	Hard (i)	Julia Glushko	W	6–2, 6–7^{(6–8)}, 7–5
2015	Z1 R/R	Feb 2015	Budapest (HUN)	Latvia	Hard (i)	Jeļena Ostapenko	L	3–6, 1–6
2015	Z1 P/O	Feb 2015	Budapest (HUN)	Serbia	Hard (i)	Aleksandra Krunić	L	1–6, 1–6
2017	Z1 R/R	Feb 2017	Tallinn (EST)	(Bosnia and Herzegovina) Bosnia&Herzegovina	Hard (i)	Jelena Simić	W	6–2, 6–1
2017	Z1 R/R	Feb 2017	Tallinn (EST)	Hungary	Hard (i)	Dalma Gálfi	W	6–2, 6–0
2017	Z1 P/O	Feb 2017	Tallinn (EST)	(United Kingdom) Great Britain	Hard (i)	Heather Watson	L	2–6, 4–6
2019	Z1 R/R	Feb 2019	Bath (GBR)	Turkey	Hard (i)	Pemra Özgen	W	7–6, 6–3
2019	Z1 R/R	Feb 2019	Bath (GBR)	Serbia	Hard (i)	Aleksandra Krunić	W	1–6, 7–5, 6–1
2022	Z1 R/R	Apr 2022	Antalya (TUR)	(Georgia (country)) Georgia	Clay	Mariam Bolkvadze	W	6–2, 6–4
2022	Z1 R/R	Apr 2022	Antalya (TUR)	Austria	Clay	Sinja Kraus	W	7–5, 6–3

==== Doubles (3–1) ====
Edition	Stage	Date	Location	Against	Surface	Partner	Opponents	W/L	Score
2012	Z1 R/R	Feb 2012	Eilat (ISR)	Poland	Hard	Ani Mijačika	Magda Linette; Alicja Rosolska	L	5–7, 5–7
2022	Z1 R/R	Apr 2022	Antalya (TUR)	Sweden	Clay	Petra Martić	Fanny Östlund; Kajsa Rinaldo Persson	W	6–2, 6–4
2022	Z1 R/R	Apr 2022	Antalya (TUR)	Bulgaria	Clay	Ana Konjuh	Rositsa Dencheva; Yoana Konstantinova	W	6–2, 6–1
2022	Z1 R/R	Apr 2022	Antalya (TUR)	Slovenia	Clay	Petra Martić	Pia Lovrič; Lara Smejkal	W	6–4, 6–4

=== United Cup participation ===
==== Singles (5–2) ====
Edition	Stage	Date	Location	Against	Surface	Opponent	W/L	Score
2023	Group stage	31 December 2022	Perth (AUS)	Argentina	Hard	María Carlé	W	6–0, 6–4
2023	Group stage	2 January 2023	Perth (AUS)	France	Hard	Alizé Cornet	W	6–4, 6–3
2023	Knockout stage	4 January 2023	Perth (AUS)	Greece	Hard	Despina Papamichail	W	6–2, 6–0
2024	Group stage	1 January 2024	Sydney (AUS)	Norway	Hard	Malene Helgø	W	7–5, 3–6, 6–3
2024	Group stage	2 January 2024	Sydney (AUS)	Netherlands	Hard	Arantxa Rus	W	6–2, 3–6, 6–1
2025	Group stage	28 December 2024	Perth (AUS)	Canada	Hard	Leylah Fernandez	L	4–6, 3–6
2025	Group stage	31 December 2024	Perth (AUS)	United States	Hard	Coco Gauff	L	4–6, 2–6

==== Mixed doubles (0–2) ====
Edition	Stage	Date	Location	Against	Surface	Partner	Opponents	W/L	Score
2024	Group stage	1 January 2024	Sydney (AUS)	Norway	Hard	Ivan Dodig	Ulrikke Eikeri; Casper Ruud	L	2–6, 6–3, [7–10]
2024	Group stage	2 January 2024	Sydney (AUS)	Netherlands	Hard	Ivan Dodig	Demi Schuurs; Wesley Koolhof	L	7–6^{(7–3)}, 3–6, [12–14]

=== Hopman Cup participation ===
==== Singles (2–1) ====
Edition	Stage	Date	Location	Against	Surface	Opponent	W/L	Score
2023	Group stage	20 July 2023	Nice (FRA)	Belgium	Clay	Elise Mertens	L	2–6, 2–6
2023	Group stage	22 July 2023	Nice (FRA)	Spain	Clay	Rebeka Masarova	W	6–2, 6–1
2023	Final	23 July 2023	Nice (FRA)	Switzerland	Clay	Céline Naef	W	6–3, 6–4

==== Mixed doubles (2–0) ====
Edition	Stage	Date	Location	Against	Surface	Partner	Opponents	W/L	Score
2023	Group stage	20 July 2023	Nice (FRA)	Belgium	Clay	Borna Ćorić	David Goffin; Elise Mertens	W	7–6^{(7–5)}, 3–6, [10–6]
2023	Group stage	22 July 2023	Nice (FRA)	Spain	Clay	Borna Ćorić	Carlos Alcaraz; Rebeka Masarova	W	1–6, 6–4, [14–12]

== WTA Tour career earnings ==
As of June 1, 2025.

Year	Grand Slam singles titles	WTA singles titles	Total singles titles	Earnings ($)	Money list rank
2014	0	1	1	325,466	95
2015	0	0	0	240,387	119
2016	0	0	0	243,988	120
2017	0	1	1	574,399	59
2018	0	0	0	830,793	46
2019	0	0	0	1,534,830	26
2020	0	0	0	450,884	47
2021	0	1	1	571,182	64
2022	0	0	0	467,528	102
2023	0	1	1	1,282,726	29
2024	0	0	0	1,885,615	20
2025	0	0	0	716,022	26
Career	0	4	4	9,471,133	81

== Grand Slam statistics ==
=== Seedings ===
The tournaments won by Vekić are in boldface, and advanced into finals by Vekić are in italics.

Year	Australian Open	French Open	Wimbledon	US Open
2012	absent	absent	absent	did not qualify
2013	not seeded	not seeded	not seeded	not seeded
2014	not seeded	not seeded	not seeded	not seeded
2015	not seeded	not seeded	did not qualify	did not qualify
2016	not seeded	not seeded	not seeded	did not qualify
2017	not seeded	not seeded	not seeded	not seeded
2018	not seeded	not seeded	not seeded	not seeded
2019	29th	23rd	22nd	23rd
2020	19th	26th	cancelled	18th
2021	28th	not seeded	not seeded	not seeded
2022	not seeded	qualifier	not seeded	not seeded
2023	not seeded	22nd	20th	21st
2024	21st	not seeded	not seeded	24th
2025	18th	18th	22nd	not seeded
2026	not seeded			

== Head-to-head records ==
=== Top-10 wins ===
#	Opponent	Rk	Event	Surface	Rd	Score	Rk
**2014**
1.	(Slovakia) Dominika Cibulková	10	Malaysian Open, Malaysia	Hard	F	5–7, 7–5, 7–6^{(7–4)}	95
**2017**
2.	(United Kingdom) Johanna Konta	8	Nottingham Open, UK	Grass	F	2–6, 7–6^{(7–3)}, 7–5	70
**2018**
3.	(United States) Sloane Stephens	4	Wimbledon, UK	Grass	1R	6–1, 6–3	55
4.	(United States) Sloane Stephens	9	Pan Pacific Open, Japan	Hard (i)	1R	6–4, 6–4	45
5.	(France) Caroline Garcia	4	Pan Pacific Open, Japan	Hard (i)	QF	6–3, 6–4	45
**2019**
6.	(Netherlands) Kiki Bertens	9	Brisbane International, Australia	Hard	2R	7–6^{(7–5)}, 1–6, 7–5	34
7.	(Czech Republic) Petra Kvitová	2	St. Petersburg Trophy, Russia	Hard (i)	QF	6–4, 6–1	30
**2021**
8.	(Belarus) Aryna Sabalenka	3	Tokyo Summer Olympics	Hard	2R	6–4, 3–6, 7–6^{(7–3)}	50
**2022**
9.	(Greece) Maria Sakkari	7	San Diego Open, U.S.	Hard	1R	7–6^{(7–3)}, 6–1	77
10.	Aryna Sabalenka	5	San Diego Open, U.S.	Hard	QF	6–4, 6–7^{(5–7)}, 6–1	77
**2023**
11.	(France) Caroline Garcia	5	Monterrey Open, Mexico	Hard (i)	F	6–4, 3–6, 7–5	31
12.	(Kazakhstan) Elena Rybakina	3	Berlin Open, Germany	Grass	2R	6–7^{(1–7)}, 6–3, 6–4	23
13.	(Greece) Maria Sakkari	8	German Open, Germany	Grass	SF	6–4, 7–6^{(10–8)}	23
**2024**
14.	Aryna Sabalenka	2	Dubai Championships, UAE	Hard	2R	6–7^{(5–7)}, 6–3, 6–0	31
15.	(United States) Coco Gauff	2	Paris Olympics, France	Clay	3R	7–6^{(9–7)}, 6–2	21
**2025**
16.	(United States) Emma Navarro	8	Indian Wells Open, United States	Hard	3R	7–6^{(7–5)}, 6–1	22
17.	(United States) Emma Navarro	10	Madrid Open, Spain	Clay	3R	4–6, 6–3, 6–2	21

=== Double-bagel matches ===
Result	W–L	Year	Tournament	Tier	Surface	Opponent	Rank	Rd	DVR
Win	1–0	2011	Lagos Open, Nigeria	25,000	Hard	(Nigeria) Biola Akewula	n/a	R1	No. 638
Win	2–0	2012	ITF Namangan, Uzbekistan	25,000	Hard	(Uzbekistan) Rano Nizamova	n/a	Q1	No. 314
Win	3–0	2016	Qatar Ladies Open, Qatar	Premier 5	Hard	(Oman) Fatma Al-Nabhani	No. 378	1R	No. 104

== Exhibition matches ==
=== Singles ===
Result	Date	Tournament	Surface	Opponent	Score
Win	Jan 2023	Kooyong Classic, Melbourne, Australia	Hard	(Czech Republic) Linda Fruhvirtová	6–4, 6–3
Win	Jan 2023	Kooyong Classic, Melbourne, Australia	Hard	(Australia) Kimberly Birrell	2–6, 6–2, 10–8
Win	Jan 2026	Kooyong Classic, Melbourne, Australia	Hard	(Australia) Priscilla Hon	6–7(4), 6–4, 10–4
Loss	Jan 2026	Kooyong Classic, Melbourne, Australia	Hard	(Philippines) Alexandra Eala	3–6, 4–6
