= Julia Terziyska =

Bulgarian tennis player (born 1996)

Julia Terziyska Джулия Терзийска
- Country (sports): Bulgaria
- Residence: Sofia, Bulgaria
- Born: 5 March 1996 (age 30) Sofia
- Height: 1.80 m (5 ft 11 in)
- Turned pro: 2012
- Plays: Right (two-handed backhand)
- Prize money: $107,694

Singles
- Career record: 257–145
- Career titles: 12 ITF
- Highest ranking: No. 306 (15 February 2016)

Doubles
- Career record: 185–123
- Career titles: 16 ITF
- Highest ranking: No. 238 (5 August 2019)

Team competitions
- Fed Cup: 6–4 (doubles 5–2)

Julia Terziyska (Bulgarian: Джулия Терзийска; born 5 March 1996) is a Bulgarian inactive tennis player.

Terziyska has a career-high singles ranking of world No. 306, achieved on 15 February 2016. She reached her highest WTA doubles ranking of No. 238 on 5 August 2019. Terziyska has won 12 singles and 16 doubles titles on the ITF Women's Circuit.

Playing for Bulgaria in Billie Jean King Cup competitions since 2018, she has a win–loss record of 6–4.

== ITF Circuit finals ==
=== Singles: 21 (12 titles, 9 runner-ups) ===
Legend $100,000 tournaments $80,000 tournaments $60,000 tournaments $25,000 tournaments $10/15,000 tournaments	Finals by surface Hard (11–8) Clay (1–1)

Result	W–L	Date	Tournament	Tier	Surface	Opponent	Score
Loss	0–1	Jan 2014	ITF Stuttgart, Germany	10k	Hard (i)	(Liechtenstein) Kathinka von Deichmann	4–6, 4–6
Win	1–1	Apr 2014	ITF Antalya, Turkey	10k	Hard	(Turkey) Melis Sezer	7–6^{(5)}, 6–2
Win	2–1	Feb 2015	ITF Sharm El Sheikh, Egypt	10k	Hard	(Russia) Anastasia Pribylova	6–2, 7–5
Win	3–1	Feb 2015	ITF Sharm El Sheikh	10k	Hard	(Russia) Anastasia Pribylova	6–3, 6–2
Loss	3–2	Mar 2015	ITF Sharm El Sheikh	10k	Hard	(United Kingdom) Katie Swan	2–6, 2–6
Loss	3–3	Mar 2015	ITF Sharm El Sheikh	10k	Hard	(Russia) Aminat Kushkhova	3–6, 0–6
Win	4–3	May 2015	ITF Sharm El Sheikh	10k	Hard	(United States) Nadja Gilchrist	6–4, 6–0
Win	5–3	May 2015	ITF Sharm El Sheikh	10k	Hard	(United Kingdom) Naomi Cavaday	4–1 ret.
Loss	5–4	Oct 2015	ITF Sozopol, Bulgaria	10k	Hard	(Germany) Vivian Heisen	2–6, 6–7^{(1)}
Loss	5–5	Feb 2016	ITF Sharm El Sheikh	10k	Hard	(Russia) Sofya Zhuk	2–6, 1–6
Win	6–5	Feb 2016	ITF Sharm El Sheikh	10k	Hard	(Russia) Varvara Flink	6–4, 6–3
Loss	6–6	Feb 2017	ITF Sharm El Sheikh	15k	Hard	(United Kingdom) Emily Webley-Smith	3–6, 4–6
Win	7–6	Dec 2017	ITF Hammamet, Tunisia	15k	Clay	(Russia) Aleksandra Kulik	2–6, 6–4, 6–2
Win	8–6	Mar 2018	ITF Sharm El Sheikh	15k	Hard	(Russia) Liudmila Samsonova	6–7^{(4)}, 6–0, 7–6^{(4)}
Win	9–6	Mar 2018	ITF Sharm El Sheikh	15k	Hard	(Spain) Nuria Párrizas Díaz	6–0, 6–2
Win	10–6	Apr 2018	ITF Sharm El Sheikh	15k	Hard	(United Kingdom) Tara Moore	6–2, 4–6, 6–4
Loss	10–7	Aug 2019	ITF El Espinar, Spain	W25	Hard	(Netherlands) Arantxa Rus	4–6, 1–6
Win	11–7	Jan 2020	ITF Stuttgart, Germany	W15	Hard (i)	(Bosnia and Herzegovina) Dea Herdželaš	6–3, 6–4
Loss	11–8	Sep 2021	ITF Varna, Bulgaria	W15	Clay	(Russia) Daria Mishina	4–6, 4–6
Loss	11–9	Oct 2021	ITF Sozopol, Bulgaria	W15	Hard	(South Korea) Ku Yeon-woo	4–6, 2–6
Win	12–9	Mar 2022	ITF Monastir, Tunisia	W15	Hard	(Germany) Kathleen Kanev	7–5, 5–7, 6–1

=== Doubles: 33 (16 titles, 17 runner-ups) ===
Legend $25,000 tournaments $10/15,000 tournaments	Finals by surface Hard (13–15) Clay (3–2)

Result	W–L	Date	Tournament	Tier	Surface	Partner	Opponents	Score
Loss	0–1	Oct 2013	ITF Burgas, Bulgaria	10k	Clay	(Italy) Federica Arcidiacono	(Bulgaria) Dia Evtimova (Bulgaria) Viktoriya Tomova	4–6, 3–6
Loss	0–2	Sep 2014	ITF Sofia, Bulgaria	25k	Clay	(Slovakia) Rebecca Šramková	(North Macedonia) Lina Gjorcheska (Greece) Despina Papamichail	1–6, 4–6
Win	1–2	Sep 2014	ITF Varna, Bulgaria	10k	Clay	(Bulgaria) Isabella Shinikova	(Romania) Diana Enache (Romania) Raluca Elena Platon	7–5, 6–1
Loss	1–3	Nov 2014	ITF Sharm El Sheikh, Egypt	25k	Hard	(Romania) Ioana Loredana Roșca	(Italy) Alice Matteucci (Belgium) Elise Mertens	7–6^{(1)}, 6–7^{(4)}, [6–10]
Win	2–3	Feb 2015	ITF Sharm El Sheikh	10k	Hard	(Russia) Anna Morgina	(Belarus) Darya Lebesheva (Russia) Anastasia Shaulskaya	6–3, 6–0
Win	3–3	Mar 2015	ITF Sharm El Sheikh	10k	Hard	(Russia) Anna Morgina	(Turkey) Ayla Aksu (Turkey) Müge Topsel	6–1, 4–6, [10–2]
Loss	3–4	Mar 2015	ITF Sharm El Sheikh	10k	Hard	(Russia) Anna Morgina	(Spain) Arabela Fernández Rabener (North Macedonia) Lina Gjorcheska	3–6, 6–7^{(4)}
Win	4–4	Apr 2015	ITF Sharm El Sheikh	10k	Hard	(North Macedonia) Lina Gjorcheska	(Poland) Wiktoria Kulik (Poland) Karolina Silwanowicz	6–0, 6–0
Loss	4–5	May 2015	ITF Sharm El Sheikh	10k	Hard	(Egypt) Ola Abou Zekry	(Romania) Elena-Teodora Cadar (Ukraine) Anastasia Kharchenko	2–6, 3–6
Win	5–5	Jun 2015	ITF Namangan, Uzbekistan	25k	Hard	(Russia) Anastasiya Komardina	(Russia) Veronika Kudermetova (Russia) Ksenia Lykina	7–6^{(2)}, 7–5
Win	6–5	Oct 2015	ITF Sozopol, Bulgaria	10k	Hard	(Bulgaria) Isabella Shinikova	(Germany) Anna Klasen (Germany) Charlotte Klasen	6–2, 6–1
Win	7–5	Oct 2015	ITF Sozopol, Bulgaria	10k	Hard	(Germany) Vivian Heisen	(Czech Republic) Lenka Kunčíková (Czech Republic) Karolína Stuchlá	6–3, 6–1
Win	8–5	Dec 2015	Lagos Open, Nigeria	25k	Hard	(India) Prarthana Thombare	(Switzerland) Conny Perrin (Slovenia) Tadeja Majerič	4–6, 6–3, [10–8]
Loss	8–6	Feb 2016	ITF Sharm El Sheikh	10k	Hard	(Romania) Oana Georgeta Simion	(South Africa) Ilze Hattingh (South Africa) Madrie Le Roux	1–6, 2–6
Win	9–6	Nov 2016	ITF Sharm El Sheikh	10k	Hard	(Germany) Julia Wachaczyk	(Hungary) Bianka Békefi (Hungary) Szabina Szlavikovics	6–4, 4–6, [10–1]
Win	10–6	Feb 2017	ITF Sharm El Sheikh	15k	Hard	(Ukraine) Veronika Kapshay	(Turkey) Pemra Özgen (Croatia) Ana Vrljić	6–3, 2–6, [10–7]
Loss	10–7	Mar 2017	ITF Sharm El Sheikh	15k	Hard	(Slovakia) Tereza Mihalíková	(Russia) Olga Doroshina (Russia) Polina Monova	w/o
Win	11–7	Dec 2017	ITF Hammamet, Tunisia	15k	Clay	(Belgium) Marie Benoît	(Italy) Anna-Giulia Remondina (Serbia) Milana Špremo	6–2, 6–3
Loss	11–8	Mar 2018	ITF Sharm El Sheikh	15k	Hard	(Romania) Laura Ioana Paar	(Belarus) Yuliya Hatouka (Chinese Taipei) Lee Pei-chi	6–4, 6–7^{(5)}, [8–10]
Loss	11–9	Mar 2018	ITF Sharm El Sheikh	15k	Hard	(Romania) Laura Ioana Paar	(Thailand) Kamonwan Buayam (Russia) Angelina Gabueva	6–1, 4–6, [5–10]
Win	12–9	Apr 2018	ITF Sharm El Sheikh	15k	Hard	(Belarus) Iryna Shymanovich	(Chinese Taipei) Chen Pei-hsuan (Chinese Taipei) Wu Fang-hsien	6–3, 7–5
Loss	12–10	Apr 2018	ITF Sharm El Sheikh	15k	Hard	(United Kingdom) Alicia Barnett	(Austria) Melanie Klaffner (Russia) Anna Morgina	5–7, 1–6
Loss	12–11	Jun 2018	ITF Namangan, Uzbekistan	25k	Hard	(Russia) Anna Morgina	(Russia) Anastasia Gasanova (Russia) Ekaterina Yashina	3–6, 1–6
Loss	12–12	Jul 2018	ITF Setúbal, Portugal	25k	Hard	(Slovakia) Tereza Mihalíková	(France) Mathilde Armitano (France) Elixane Lechemia	7–6^{(5)}, 3–6, [11–13]
Win	13–12	Oct 2018	Lagos Open, Nigeria	25k	Hard	(Slovakia) Tereza Mihalíková	(France) Estelle Cascino (Israel) Deniz Khazaniuk	6–7^{(4)}, 6–2, [10–7]
Win	14–12	Oct 2018	Lagos Open, Nigeria	25k	Hard	(Netherlands) Rosalie van der Hoek	(Netherlands) Merel Hoedt (Netherlands) Noa Liauw a Fong	6–4, 6–4
Loss	14–13	Jan 2019	ITF Monastir, Tunisia	W15	Hard	(Spain) Claudia Hoste Ferrer	(Turkey) İpek Soylu (China) Zhang Ying	3–6, 3–6
Loss	14–14	Jun 2019	ITF Madrid, Spain	W15	Hard	(Romania) Ioana Loredana Roșca	(Lithuania) Justina Mikulskytė (United States) Christina Rosca	3–6, 7–6^{(8)}, [8–10]
Loss	14–15	Jul 2019	ITF Palmela, Portugal	W25	Hard	(France) Estelle Cascino	(United Kingdom) Sarah Beth Grey (United Kingdom) Eden Silva	5–7, 2–6
Win	15–15	Jul 2019	ITF Porto, Portugal	W25	Hard	(France) Estelle Cascino	(Sweden) Jacqueline Cabaj Awad (Portugal) Inês Murta	7–6^{(0)}, 6–3
Loss	15–16	Oct 2021	ITF Sozopol, Bulgaria	W15	Hard	(Bulgaria) Gergana Topalova	(Bulgaria) Katerina Dimitrova (Romania) Oana Gavrilă	6–3, 4–6, [1–10]
Loss	15–17	Mar 2022	ITF Monastir, Tunisia	W15	Hard	(Belgium) Eliessa Vanlangendonck	(Japan) Michika Ozeki (United States) Lauren Proctor	5–7, 6–7^{(9)}
Win	16–17	Apr 2024	ITF Kuršumlijska Banja, Serbia	W15	Clay	(Serbia) Bojana Marinković	(Netherlands) Rikke de Koning (Netherlands) Madelief Hageman	6–3, 1–6, [10–5]

== Fed Cup/Billie Jean King Cup participation ==
Julia Terziyska debuted for the Bulgaria Fed Cup team in 2018. She has a 1–2 singles and a 5–2 doubles record (6–4 overall).

=== Singles (1–2) ===
Edition	Round	Date	Location	Against	Surface	Opponent	W/L	Result
2012	Z1 PO	11 Apr 2022	Antalya, Turkey	Austria	Clay	Sinja Kraus	L	1–6, 4–6
2012	Z1 PO	12 Apr 2022	Antalya, Turkey	Croatia	Clay	Petra Marčinko	L	4–6, 4–6
2012	Z1 PO	15 Apr 2022	Antalya, Turkey	Georgia	Clay	Tamari Gagoshidze	W	6–1, 6–1

=== Doubles (5–2) ===
Edition	Round	Date	Location	Partner	Surface	Against	Opponents	W/L	Result
2018	Z1 RR	7 Feb 2018	Tallinn, Estonia	Petia Arshinkova	Hard (i)	Serbia	Olga Danilović; Dejana Radanović	W	6–3, 7–6^{(8–6)}
2018	Z1 RR	8 Feb 2018	Tallinn, Estonia	Petia Arshinkova	Hard (i)	Georgia	Oksana Kalashnikova; Sofia Shapatava	L	0–6, 4–6
2022	Z1 RR	11 Apr 2022	Antalya, Turkey	Isabella Shinikova	Clay	Austria	Barbara Haas; Sinja Kraus	W	6–7^{(6–8)}, 6–2, 6–4
2022	Z1 RR	13 Apr 2022	Antalya, Turkey	Viktoriya Tomova	Clay	Sweden	Kajsa Rinaldo Persson; Julita Saner	W	6–1, 2–6, 6–0
2022	Z1 RR	14 Apr 2022	Antalya, Turkey	Isabella Shinikova	Clay	Slovenia	Živa Falkner; Lara Smejkal	W	6–0, 5–7, 6–1
2023	Z1 RR	11 Apr 2023	Antalya, Turkey	Isabella Shinikova	Clay	Croatia	Lucija Ćirić Bagarić; Antonia Ružić	W	7–6^{(7–4)}, 4–6, 6–3
2023	Z1 RR	12 Apr 2023	Antalya, Turkey	Isabella Shinikova	Clay	Sweden	Jacqueline Cabaj Awad; Caijsa Hennemann	L	6–7^{(6–8)}, 6–4, 5–7
