= 2013 Fed Cup Europe/Africa Zone Group I – Pool A =

Group A of the 2013 Fed Cup Europe/Africa Zone Group I was one of four pools in the Europe/Africa zone of the 2013 Fed Cup. Four teams competed in a round robin competition, with the top team and the bottom team proceeding to their respective sections of the play-offs: the top team played for advancement to the World Group II Play-offs, while the bottom team faced potential relegation to Group II.

== Standings ==
		(Belarus) BLR	(Austria) AUT	(Croatia) CRO	(Georgia (country)) GEO	RR; W–L	Match; W–L	Set; W–L	Game; W–L	Standings
17	Belarus		2–1	0–3	3–0	2–1	5–4	11–11	101–98	2
25	Austria	1–2		1–2	3–0	1–2	5–4	12–9	97–84	3
40	Croatia	3–0	2–1		3–0	3–0	8–1	16–3	112–60	1
42	Georgia	0–3	0–3	0–3		0–3	0–9	2–18	48–116	4

== Round-robin ==
=== Belarus vs. Georgia ===
Belarus
3
Municipal Tennis Club, Eilat, Israel
6 February 2013
Hard (outdoors)

Georgia
0

			1	2	3
1	(Belarus) (Georgia (country))	Aliaksandra Sasnovich; Margalita Chakhnashvili	6; 3	6; 2
2	(Belarus) (Georgia (country))	Ilona Kremen; Sofia Shapatava	6; 3	6^{5} 7^{7}	3; 0	retired
3	(Belarus) (Georgia (country))	Lidziya Marozava / Aliaksandra Sasnovich; Ekaterine Gorgodze / Sofia Kvatsabaia	6; 2	6; 2

=== Austria vs. Croatia ===
Austria
1
Municipal Tennis Club, Eilat, Israel
6 February 2013
Hard (outdoors)

Croatia
2

			1	2	3
1	(Austria) (Croatia)	Patricia Mayr-Achleitner; Tereza Mrdeža	6; 3	7; 5
2	(Austria) (Croatia)	Yvonne Meusburger; Donna Vekić	1; 6	3; 6
3	(Austria) (Croatia)	Patricia Mayr-Achleitner / Yvonne Meusburger; Darija Jurak / Ana Konjuh	4; 6	4; 6

=== Belarus vs. Austria ===
Belarus
2
Municipal Tennis Club, Eilat, Israel
7 February 2013
Hard (outdoors)

Austria
1

			1	2	3
1	(Belarus) (Austria)	Aliaksandra Sasnovich; Patricia Mayr-Achleitner	6; 3	4; 6	6; 4
2	(Belarus) (Austria)	Ilona Kremen; Yvonne Meusburger	6; 2	2; 6	6; 1
3	(Belarus) (Austria)	Ilona Kremen / Aliaksandra Sasnovich; Nicole Rottmann / Melanie Klaffner				w/o

=== Croatia vs. Georgia ===
Croatia
3
Municipal Tennis Club, Eilat, Israel
7 February 2013
Hard (outdoors)

Georgia
0

			1	2	3
1	(Croatia) (Georgia (country))	Ana Konjuh; Sofia Kvatsabaia	6; 0	6; 0
2	(Croatia) (Georgia (country))	Donna Vekić; Margalita Chakhnashvili	6; 0	6; 1
3	(Croatia) (Georgia (country))	Tereza Mrdeža / Darija Jurak; Sofia Shapatava / Ekaterine Gorgodze	6; 3	6; 2

=== Belarus vs. Croatia ===
Belarus
0
Municipal Tennis Club, Eilat, Israel
8 February 2013
Hard (outdoors)

Croatia
3

			1	2	3
1	(Belarus) (Croatia)	Aliaksandra Sasnovich; Ana Konjuh	7^{7} 6^{3}	4; 6	2; 6
2	(Belarus) (Croatia)	Ilona Kremen; Donna Vekić	1; 6	6^{2} 7^{7}
3	(Belarus) (Croatia)	Lidziya Marozava / Aliaksandra Sasnovich; Tereza Mrdeža / Darija Jurak	6^{2} 7^{7}	3; 6

=== Georgia vs. Austria ===
Georgia
0
Municipal Tennis Club, Eilat, Israel
8 February 2013
Hard (outdoors)

Austria
3

			1	2	3
1	(Georgia (country)) (Austria)	Margalita Chakhnashvili; Patricia Mayr-Achleitner	1; 6	2; 6
2	(Georgia (country)) (Austria)	Sofia Shapatava; Yvonne Meusburger	3; 6	2; 6
3	(Georgia (country)) (Austria)	Sofia Shapatava / Margalita Chakhnashvili; Nicole Rottmann / Melanie Klaffner	6; 2	4; 6	4; 6

== See also ==
- Fed Cup structure
