= Ana Konjuh =

Croatian tennis player (born 1997)

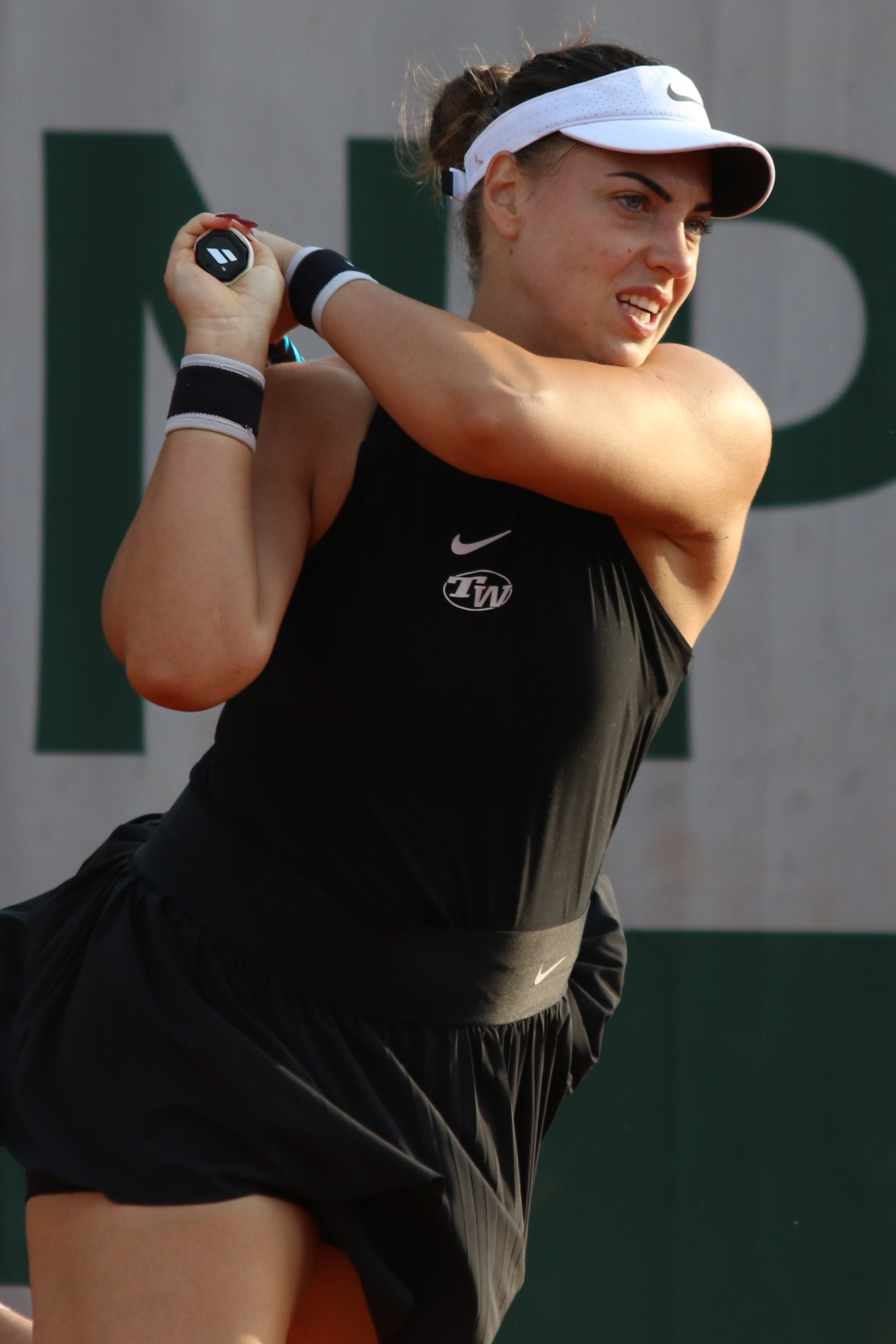
- Konjuh at the 2023 French Open
- Country (sports): Croatia
- Born: 27 December 1997 (age 28) Dubrovnik, Croatia
- Height: 1.74 m (5 ft 9 in)
- Turned pro: 2014
- Plays: Right (two-handed backhand)
- Coach: Antonio Veić
- Prize money: $3,069,074
- Official website: anakonjuh.net

Singles
- Career record: 272–202
- Career titles: 1 WTA, 5 ITF
- Highest ranking: No. 20 (31 July 2017)
- Current ranking: No. 934 (27 July 2026)

Grand Slam singles results
- Australian Open: 2R (2016, 2017, 2022)
- French Open: 2R (2015, 2016, 2017)
- Wimbledon: 4R (2017)
- US Open: QF (2016)

Other tournaments
- Olympic Games: 2R (2016)

Doubles
- Career record: 14–17
- Career titles: 0
- Highest ranking: No. 176 (24 July 2017)
- Current ranking: No. 910 (27 July 2026)

Grand Slam doubles results
- Australian Open: 1R (2017)
- French Open: 2R (2016, 2017)
- Wimbledon: 3R (2017)
- US Open: 1R (2017)

Grand Slam mixed doubles results
- Wimbledon: 3R (2015)

Team competitions
- Fed Cup: 22–11
- Last updated on: 1 August 2026.

Ana Konjuh (Croatian pronunciation: [âna kôɲuːx, ǎːna-]; born 27 December 1997) is a Croatian tennis player.

A successful junior player, Konjuh won both the singles and doubles junior events at the Australian Open in January 2013 and, as a result, moved up to No. 1 in the ITF Junior world rankings. Later in the year, she also won the girls' singles event at the 2013 US Open. She turned her attention to the main tour in 2014, and made her debut in the top 100 aged 16.

Konjuh won her first singles title on the WTA Tour at the 2015 Nottingham Open, becoming the youngest player to win a main tour event since 2006. She has also won four titles on the ITF Women's Circuit. On 31 July 2017, she reached her career-high singles ranking of world No. 20.

== Career ==
=== Junior years ===
Aged 14, Konjuh was the runner-up at the 2012 Wimbledon Championships in girls' doubles. In December 2012, Konjuh won two prestigious junior tennis tournaments, Eddie Herr and the Orange Bowl.

In January 2013, she won the singles and doubles events at the Australian Open, and became the No. 1 junior in the world. She also received a call up to the Croatia Fed Cup team, where she scored the biggest win of her career, defeating Poland's Urszula Radwańska, ranked No. 37 in the world, at the age of 15.

In September 2013, Konjuh won the singles title at the US Open, her second singles junior Grand Slam. Despite being eligible to continue playing junior tournaments for two more years, Konjuh ceased playing junior events at the end of 2013, changing her focus to competing on the main tour in 2014.

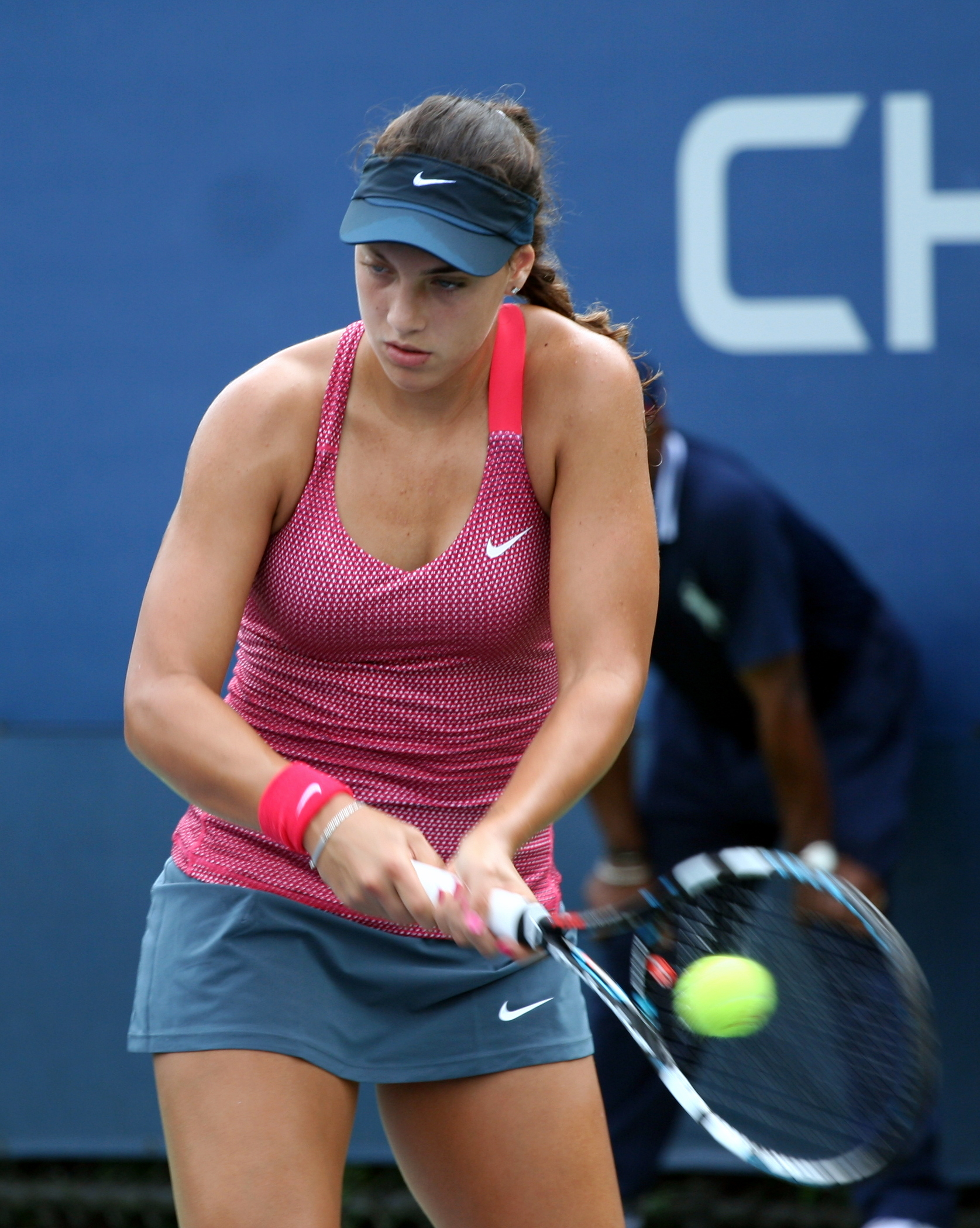
Konjuh at the 2013 US Open

=== 2014: First full tour season and top-100 ranking ===
Konjuh was awarded a main-draw wildcard for the Auckland Open in New Zealand. On her debut at WTA Tour-level, she stunned the top seed and world No. 14 Roberta Vinci, in the first round in three sets. At the Australian Open, she came through qualifying to reach her first Grand Slam main draw, but lost in the first round to the fourth seed and eventual champion, Li Na.

Konjuh underwent elbow surgery on 23 January in Zagreb. Her recovery lasted four months, and she made her return in May by defeating Allie Kiick at the Open Saint-Gaudens. Konjuh made it to the semifinals of the $50k tournament in France, before losing to the eventual champion Danka Kovinić, in straight sets. This run helped her up to a new world ranking high of No. 189 and enabled her to enter the qualifying draw at Roland Garros, but she again suffered defeat to Kovinić in the second round. She was more successful at Wimbledon, qualifying for the main draw with victories over Estrella Cabeza Candela, Laura Siegemund and Stephanie Vogt. She then earned her first career major main-draw win by defeating Marina Erakovic in the first round, and followed it up with the bigger win of her career to date, toppling former world No. 12, Yanina Wickmayer, in the second round. Konjuh's run came to an end in the following round with a straight-sets loss to the former world No. 1, Caroline Wozniacki.

Konjuh's good form continued at the Istanbul Cup, where she came through qualifying to reach her first main-draw semifinal, defeating top-40 players Magdaléna Rybáriková and Elina Svitolina en route. Her run came to an end with a defeat to Roberta Vinci. Konjuh suffered disappointment at the US Open when she lost to Urszula Radwańska in the first round of qualifying.

In October, she competed at the Japan Women's Open in Osaka and made the quarterfinals, before losing to Zarina Diyas. The result saw her ranking climb to within the top 100 for the first time, aged just 16. She completed her year by competing in three tournaments in France, reaching the semifinals of ITF events in Poitiers and Nantes, and the quarterfinals of the WTA 125 Open de Limoges. This saw Konjuh rise to a new career-high ranking of No. 84, and she completed the season ranked 90, and as the youngest player within the top 100.

=== 2015: First WTA Tour title ===
Konjuh began the year in Auckland, comfortably defeating Mona Barthel, before losing to Elena Vesnina in the second round. She lost in the first round of the Australian Open to Magdaléna Rybáriková. After a string of early losses, she qualified for the main draw of the Prague Open in April, where she defeated the seventh seed, world No. 34 Belinda Bencic, in three sets in the first round. Konjuh then lost in the second round to wildcard entrant Klara Koukalová. Konjuh's indifferent form continued through the clay-court season, but she earned her first main-draw win at the French Open by defeating Margarita Gasparyan, before losing to the 30th seed Irina-Camelia Begu in the second round.

In June, Konjuh competed in the main draw at the inaugural Nottingham Open and reached the quarterfinals with victories over Shelby Rogers and Casey Dellacqua. After being delayed for over two days due to poor weather, Konjuh advanced to the semifinals by defeating Sachia Vickery, and later that day reached her first WTA Tour final by beating Alison Riske. Owing to poor weather, the final was held back to Monday. Konjuh dropped the first set to Monica Niculescu, but recovered to earn victory and her first WTA Tour title. At the age of 17, she was the youngest player to win a main-tour title since Tamira Paszek in 2006.

=== 2016: First major quarterfinal ===
Ranked No. 87 in the world, Konjuh began the season at the Australian Open, where she lost in the second round to Daria Kasatkina. Except for a quarterfinal appearance at the San Antonio Open, she had early exits at most of her tournaments, including Indian Wells, Miami and Madrid Open. At the French Open, Konjuh reached the second round beating Arina Rodionova in straight sets. She then lost to the No. 22 seed Dominika Cibulková. After a semifinal appearance at the Bol Ladies Open, Konjuh withdrew from the Nottingham Open owing to an injury she sustained at the previous tournament, and fell from the top 100.

After early exits at the Mallorca Open and the Eastbourne International, Konjuh competed in the second round of Wimbledon, after beating Karin Knapp, before losing to Agnieszka Radwańska in three sets having been hampered by an ankle injury during the match. After her campaign, she returned to the top 100. Her next tournament was the Olympics in Rio de Janeiro where she beat Annika Beck, before losing to the world No. 12, Carla Suárez Navarro. Despite losing in the second round of qualifying at the Western & Southern Open, Konjuh qualified for the Connecticut Open where she reached the second round, losing to Roberta Vinci in straight sets.

At the US Open, Konjuh upset the 20th seed Kiki Bertens in the first round. She went on to beat Kurumi Nara and Varvara Lepchenko en route to her first major fourth round. She then beat the fourth seed Agnieszka Radwańska in straight sets to become the first Croatian female quarterfinalist since Karolina Šprem at Wimbledon in 2004. She lost to the tenth seed and eventual finalist Karolína Plíšková in the quarterfinals in straight sets. After the tournament ended, her ranking rose from 92 to 52. After failing in the qualifying round in both the Wuhan Open and the China Open, Konjuh reached semifinals at Guangzhou and quarterfinals at the Kremlin Cup, losing to Jelena Janković and Elina Svitolina, respectively. She ended the year as the world No. 48.

=== 2017: Top-20 debut, Auckland final ===
Konjuh started the year at the Auckland Open, where she reached her second WTA Tour final beating Naomi Osaka and Julia Görges en route. She then lost in straight sets to Lauren Davis. Despite her loss, Konjuh reached a career-high ranking of world No. 36. At the Australian Open, she beat Kristina Mladenovic in straight sets, before losing to Daria Gavrilova.

After losing in the round of 16 of the St. Petersburg Ladies' Trophy to the top seed Simona Halep, Konjuh played at Dubai, where she defeated Zhang Shuai in the first round. She then had back-to-back upsets over the No. 12 seed Samantha Stosur, and the No. 8 seed, Elena Vesnina, en route to the quarterfinals, where she lost to the top seed, Angelique Kerber.

At Wimbledon, she defeated world No. 9, Dominika Cibulková, but lost to the eventual finalist, Venus Williams, in the fourth round. Following this successful run, she achieved a career-high ranking of world No. 20, on 31 July 2017.

In September 2017, Konjuh underwent surgery on her right elbow.

=== 2018–2021: Injury problems, comeback, Serbia Open final ===
Konjuh ended up having four surgeries on her elbow problem which severely impacted on her schedule for the next three years, limiting her appearances and stalling her career progression.

In 2021, at the Miami Open, Konjuh received a wildcard entry and secured her first WTA Tour main-draw win for three years, defeating Kateřina Siniaková. She went on to overcome 18th seed Madison Keys and 15th seed Iga Świątek, before losing in the round of 16 against Anastasija Sevastova.

At the 2021 Serbia Open, Konjuh qualified for the main draw and reached her first WTA Tour final in more than four years, defeating second seed Yulia Putintseva in the round of 16, fifth seed Nadia Podoroska in the quarterfinal and teenager Camila Osorio in the semifinal. She retired due to a right hip injury in the final with Paula Badosa but thanks to another great run, she returned to the top 150, climbing 44 spots in the rankings to No. 144, her best ranking since 2018.

=== 2022: Two WTA Tour quarterfinals, broken leg, second comeback ===
In January, Konjuh reached the quarterfinals at the Melbourne Summer Set 1, losing to qualifier Zheng Qinwen, and the Adelaide International 2, where her run was ended by third seed Coco Gauff. At the Australian Open, she defeated Shelby Rogers to make it into the second round, where she lost to 30th seed Danielle Collins.

Having made it back up into the world's top-50 for the first time in four years, she suffered a broken leg which required surgery following a fall in May. Konjuh returned to competitive action at the US Open, but was double bagelled by 15th seed Beatriz Haddad Maia in the first round.

In October, she entered the main draw at the WTA 125 Open de Rouen as a lucky loser and made it through to the quarterfinals with wins over Dayana Yastremska and 10th seed Viktoriya Tomova, before losing to Varvara Gracheva in the last eight. The next month, Konjuh won back-to-back ITF titles in Bratislava and Ortisei and then reached the semifinals at the WTA 125 Andorrà Open.

=== 2023–2025: More injuries ===
Konjuh qualified for the main-draw at the Lyon Open in January 2023, but retired after losing the opening set of her first-round match against Mayar Sherif. The following month at the Mérida Open, again entering as a qualifier, she lost in the main-draw first round to Nuria Párrizas Díaz in three sets. In July 2023, Konjuh underwent surgery on her wrist and ankle which put her out of action for several months.

She used her protected ranking to enter the main draw at the Morocco Open in May 2025, but lost to eventual champion Maya Joint in the first round.

In September 2025, Konjuh won her first title for almost three years at the ITF Šibenik, defeating Pia Lovrič in the final.

== Performance timelines ==
Key
W	F	SF	QF	#R	RR	Q#	P#	DNQ	A	Z#	PO	G	S	B	NMS	NTI	P	NH

(W) winner; (F) finalist; (SF) semifinalist; (QF) quarterfinalist; (#R) rounds 4, 3, 2, 1; (RR) round-robin stage; (Q#) qualification round; (P#) preliminary round; (DNQ) did not qualify; (A) absent; (Z#) Davis/Fed Cup Zonal Group (with number indication) or (PO) play-off; (G) gold, (S) silver or (B) bronze Olympic/Paralympic medal; (NMS) not a Masters tournament; (NTI) not a Tier I tournament; (P) postponed; (NH) not held; (SR) strike rate (events won / competed); (W–L) win–loss record.
To avoid confusion and double counting, these charts are updated at the conclusion of a tournament or when the player's participation has ended.

Only main-draw results in WTA Tour, Grand Slam tournaments, Fed Cup/Billie Jean King Cup and Olympic Games are included in win–loss records.

=== Singles ===
Current through the 2025 Australian Open.

Tournament	2014	2015	2016	2017	2018	2019	2020	2021	2022	2023	2024	2025	SR	W–L	Win%
Grand Slam tournaments
Australian Open	1R	1R	2R	2R	A	A	A	Q3	2R	Q1	A	Q1	0 / 5	3–5	38%
French Open	Q2	2R	2R	2R	1R	A	A	1R	A	Q1	A	A	0 / 5	3–5	38%
Wimbledon	3R	1R	2R	4R	1R	A	NH	1R	A	Q2	A	A	0 / 6	6–6	50%
US Open	Q1	2R	QF	1R	A	A	A	1R	1R	A	Q3	A	0 / 5	5–5	50%
Win–loss	2–2	2–4	7–4	5–4	0–2	0–0	0–0	0–3	1–2	0–0	0–0	0–0	0 / 21	17–21	45%
National representation
Summer Olympics	NH		2R	NH				A	NH		A	NH	0 / 1	1–1	50%
WTA 1000
Dubai / Qatar Open (Note: The first Premier 5 event of the year has switched back and forth between the Dubai Tennis Championships and the Qatar Ladies Open since 2009. Dubai was classified as a Premier 5 event from 2009 to 2011 before being succeeded by Doha for the 2012–2014 period. In 2015, Dubai regained its Premier 5 status while Doha was demoted to Premier status. The Premier 5 tournaments were reclassified as WTA 1000 tournaments in 2021.)	A	Q1	1R	QF	A	A	A	1R	2R	A	A	A	0 / 4	4–4	50%
Indian Wells Open	A	Q2	Q1	2R	A	A	NH	2R	1R	Q1	A	A	0 / 3	1–3	25%
Miami Open	A	Q2	Q1	2R	A	A	NH	4R	1R	A	A	Q1	0 / 3	3–3	50%
Madrid Open	A	Q1	Q1	1R	A	A	NH	Q2	1R	Q1	A	A	0 / 2	0–2	0%
Italian Open	A	A	Q2	A	A	A	A	A	Q2	Q2	A	A	0 / 0	0–0	–
Canadian Open	A	Q1	A	1R	A	A	NH	A	A	A	A	A	0 / 1	0–1	0%
Cincinnati Open	A	1R	Q2	1R	A	A	A	A	A	A	A	A	0 / 2	0–2	0%
Wuhan Open	A	Q2	Q1	A	A	A	NH				A	A	0 / 0	0–0	–
China Open	A	A	Q1	A	A	A	NH			A	A	A	0 / 0	0–0	–
Career statistics
Tournaments	6	10	13	18	3	1	0	14	13	2			Career total: 80		
Titles	0	1	0	0	0	0	0	0	0	0	0		Career total: 1		
Finals	0	1	0	1	0	0	0	1	0	0	0		Career total: 3		
Overall win–loss	8–6	11–9	15–13	22–18	1–3	0–1	0–0	17–14	6–13	0–2			1 / 80	90–79	53%
Win %	57%	55%	54%	55%	25%	0%	–	55%	32%	0%			Career total: 53%		
Year-end ranking	90	80	48	44	418	1270	538	66	136	225	717	573	$2,842,871		

=== Doubles ===
Tournament	2015	2016	2017	...	2023	SR	W–L
Australian Open	A	A	1R		A	0 / 1	0–1
French Open	A	2R	2R		A	0 / 2	2–2
Wimbledon	2R	A	3R		A	0 / 2	3–2
US Open	1R	A	1R		A	0 / 2	0–2
Win–loss	1–2	1–1	3–4		0–0	0 / 7	5–7

== WTA Tour finals ==
=== Singles: 3 (1 title, 2 runner-ups) ===
Legend WTA 1000 WTA 500 WTA 250 (1–2)	Finals by surface Hard (0–1) Clay (0–1) Grass (1–0)

Result	W–L	Date	Tournament	Tier	Surface	Opponent	Score
Win	1–0	Jun 2015	Nottingham Open, United Kingdom	International (Note: The WTA International tournaments were reclassified as WTA 250 tournaments in 2021.)	Grass	(Romania) Monica Niculescu	1–6, 6–4, 6–2
Loss	1–1	Jan 2017	Auckland Open, New Zealand	International	Hard	(United States) Lauren Davis	3–6, 1–6
Loss	1–2	May 2021	Belgrade Open, Serbia	WTA 250	Clay	(Spain) Paula Badosa	2–6, 0–2 ret.

== ITF Circuit finals ==
=== Singles: 7 (5 titles, 2 runner-ups) ===
Legend W60 tournaments (1–0) W25 tournaments (3–1) W10/15 tournaments (1–1)	Finals by surface Hard (2–0) Clay (3–2)

Result	W–L	Date	Tournament	Tier	Surface	Opponent	Score
Loss	0–1	Nov 2012	ITF Antalya, Turkey	10,000	Clay	(Serbia) Jovana Jakšić	3–6, 1–6
Loss	0–2	May 2013	Maribor Open, Slovenia	25,000	Clay	(Slovenia) Polona Hercog	6–3, 3–6, 3–6
Win	1–2	Jun 2013	Open de Montpellier, France	25,000	Clay	(Russia) Irina Khromacheva	6–3, 6–1
Win	2–2	Sep 2020	Zagreb Ladies Open, Croatia	W25	Clay	(Croatia) Tereza Mrdeža	6–4, 6–2
Win	3–2	Nov 2022	Slovak Open, Slovakia	W60	Hard (i)	(Uzbekistan) Nigina Abduraimova	2–6, 6–0, 7–6^{(2)}
Win	4–2	Nov 2022	ITF Ortisei, Italy	W25	Hard (i)	(Slovakia) Viktória Kužmová	3–6, 7–5, 7–6^{(2)}
Win	5–2	Sep 2025	ITF Šibenik, Croatia	W15	Clay	(Slovenia) Pia Lovrič	6–2, 6–2

=== Doubles: 1 (runner-up) ===
Legend $50,000 tournaments	Finals by surface Clay (0–1)

Result	W–L	Date	Tournament	Tier	Surface	Partner	Opponents	Score
Loss	0–1	Jul 2013	Contrexéville Open, France	50,000	Clay	(Croatia) Silvia Njirić	(Argentina) Vanesa Furlanetto (France) Amandine Hesse	6–7^{(3)}, 4–6

== Junior Grand Slam tournament finals ==
=== Singles: 2 (2 titles) ===
Result	Year	Championship	Surface	Opponent	Score
Win	2013	Australian Open	Hard	(Czech Republic) Kateřina Siniaková	6–3, 6–4
Win	2013	US Open	Hard	(United States) Tornado Black	3–6, 6–4, 7–6^{(6)}

=== Doubles: 2 (1 title, 1 runner-up) ===
Result	Year	Championship	Surface	Partner	Opponents	Score
Loss	2012	Wimbledon	Grass	(Switzerland) Belinda Bencic	(Canada) Eugenie Bouchard (United States) Taylor Townsend	4–6, 3–6
Win	2013	Australian Open	Hard	(Canada) Carol Zhao	(Ukraine) Oleksandra Korashvili (Czech Republic) Barbora Krejčíková	5–7, 6–4, [10–7]

== Fed Cup/Billie Jean King Cup participation ==
=== Singles (12–6) ===
Edition	Stage	Date	Location	Against	Surface	Opponent	W/L	Score
2013	Z1 R/R	Feb 2013	Eilat, Israel	(Georgia (country)) Georgia	Hard	Sofia Kvatsabaia	W	6–0, 6–0
2013	Z1 R/R	Feb 2013	Eilat, Israel	Belarus	Hard	Aliaksandra Sasnovich	W	6–7^{(3–7)}, 6–4, 6–2
2013	Z1 P/O	Feb 2013	Eilat, Israel	Poland	Hard	Urszula Radwańska	W	2–6, 6–3, 7–6^{(8–6)}
2015	Z1 R/R	Feb 2015	Budapest, Hungary	Israel	Hard (i)	Keren Shlomo	W	6–3, 6–0
2015	Z1 R/R	Feb 2015	Budapest, Hungary	Latvia	Hard (i)	Dārta-Elizabete Emuliņa	W	6–1, 6–0
2015	Z1 R/R	Feb 2015	Budapest, Hungary	Belgium	Hard (i)	Kirsten Flipkens	W	6–2, 4–6, 6–4
2015	Z1 P/O	Feb 2015	Budapest, Hungary	Serbia	Hard (i)	Ivana Jorović	L	3–6, 6–2, 5–7
2016	Z1 R/R	Feb 2016	Eilat, Israel	Estonia	Hard	Anett Kontaveit	L	6–4, 3–6, 4–6
2016	Z1 R/R	Feb 2016	Eilat, Israel	Turkey	Hard	Çağla Büyükakçay	L	3–6, 6–2, 3–6
2016	Z1 R/R	Feb 2016	Eilat, Israel	Israel	Hard	Julia Glushko	W	7–6^{(7–4)}, 6–1
2016	Z1 P/O	Feb 2016	Eilat, Israel	Portugal	Hard	Michelle Larcher de Brito	W	6–2, 6–2
2017	Z1 R/R	Feb 2017	Tallinn, Estonia	Bosnia and Herzegovina	Hard (i)	Dea Herdželaš	W	6–0, 6–2
2017	Z1 R/R	Feb 2017	Tallinn, Estonia	Hungary	Hard (i)	Tímea Babos	L	1–6, 2–6
2017	Z1 P/O	Feb 2017	Tallinn, Estonia	(United Kingdom) Great Britain	Hard (i)	Johanna Konta	W	6–4, 6–3
2019	Z1 R/R	Feb 2019	Bath, Great Britain	Turkey	Hard (i)	Çağla Büyükakçay	L	5–7, 6–2, 3–6
2019	Z1 R/R	Feb 2019	Bath, Great Britain	(Georgia (country)) Georgia	Hard (i)	Mariam Bolkvadze	W	6–4, 6–3
2022	Z1 R/R	Apr 2022	Antalya, Turkey	Sweden	Clay	Caijsa Hennemann	W	6–1, 6–3
2022	Z1 R/R	Apr 2022	Antalya, Turkey	Slovenia	Clay	Kaja Juvan	L	2–6, 5–7
2022	P/O	Nov 2022	Rijeka, Croatia	Germany	Hard (i)	Jule Niemeier	L	2–6, 1–6

=== Doubles (10–4) ===
Edition	Stage	Date	Location	Against	Surface	Partner	Opponents	W/L	Score
2013	Z1 R/R	Feb 2013	Eilat, Israel	Austria	Hard	Darija Jurak	Patricia Mayr-Achleitner; Yvonne Meusburger	W	6–4, 6–4
2013	Z1 P/O	Feb 2013	Eilat, Israel	Poland	Hard	Darija Jurak	Agnieszka Radwańska; Urszula Radwańska	L	2–6, 4–6
2015	Z1 R/R	Feb 2015	Budapest, Hungary	Israel	Hard (i)	Darija Jurak	Alona Pushkarevsky; Keren Shlomo	W	6–0, 6–0
2015	Z1 R/R	Feb 2015	Budapest, Hungary	Latvia	Hard (i)	Darija Jurak	Jeļena Ostapenko; Diāna Marcinkēviča	W	6–4, 6–3
2015	Z1 R/R	Feb 2015	Budapest, Hungary	Belgium	Hard (i)	Darija Jurak	Kirsten Flipkens; Alison Van Uytvanck	W	6–3, 6–2
2016	Z1 R/R	Feb 2016	Eilat, Israel	Estonia	Hard	Darija Jurak	Valeria Gorlats; Anett Kontaveit	W	6–0, 6–1
2016	Z1 R/R	Feb 2016	Eilat, Israel	Turkey	Hard	Darija Jurak	Çağla Büyükakçay; Pemra Özgen	W	7–5, 6–3
2016	Z1 R/R	Feb 2016	Eilat, Israel	Israel	Hard	Darija Jurak	Julia Glushko; Shahar Pe'er	L	4–6, 6–7^{(2–7)}
2017	Z1 R/R	Feb 2017	Tallinn, Estonia	Hungary	Hard (i)	Darija Jurak	Tímea Babos; Dalma Gálfi	W	7–5, 3–6, 6–1
2017	Z1 P/O	Feb 2017	Tallinn, Estonia	(United Kingdom) Great Britain	Hard (i)	Darija Jurak	Johanna Konta; Heather Watson	L	6–4, 4–6, 3–6
2019	Z1 R/R	Feb 2019	Bath, Great Britain	(Georgia (country)) Georgia	Hard (i)	Darija Jurak	Ekaterine Gorgodze; Oksana Kalashnikova	W	7–5, 6–1
2019	Z1 R/R	Feb 2019	Bath, Great Britain	Serbia	Hard (i)	Darija Jurak	Olga Danilović; Aleksandra Krunić	L	6–1, 1–6, 4–6
2022	Z1 R/R	Apr 2022	Antalya, Turkey	Bulgaria	Clay	Donna Vekić	Rositsa Dencheva; Yoana Konstantinova	W	6–2, 6–1
2022	Z1 R/R	Apr 2022	Antalya, Turkey	(Georgia (country)) Georgia	Clay	Tara Würth	Mariam Bolkvadze; Oksana Kalashnikova	W	5–7, 7–6^{(7–2)}, retired

== Awards ==
Year	Award	Award Category	Result	Ref.
2013	Dražen Petrović Award	Junior Female Athlete	Won	
2013	Dražen Petrović Award	Female Promise	Won	
2013	EOC Piotr Nurowski Prize	European Young Athlete	Nominated	

== Head-to-head records ==
=== Top 10 wins ===
Season	2016	2017	Total
Wins	1	2	3

#	Player	Rank	Tournament	Surface	Rd	Score	AKR
2016
1.	(Poland) Agnieszka Radwańska	No. 4	US Open	Hard	4R	6–4, 6–4	No. 92
2017
2.	(United Kingdom) Johanna Konta	No. 10	Fed Cup, Tallinn	Hard (i)	ZG1	6–4, 6–3	No. 37
3.	(Slovakia) Dominika Cibulková	No. 9	Wimbledon, UK	Grass	3R	7–6^{(7–3)}, 3–6, 6–4	No. 29

=== Double-bagel matches ===
Result	W–L	Year	Tournament	Tier	Surface	Opponent	Rank	Rd	AKR
Win	1–0	2013	Fed Cup, Israel	Fed Cup	Hard	(Georgia (country)) Sofia Kvatsabaia	n/a	RR	No. 873
Loss	1–1	2016	Wuhan Open, China	Premier 5	Hard	(United States) Grace Min	No. 132	Q1	No. 55
Win	2–1	2021	ITF Prague, Czech Republic	25,000	Clay	(United Kingdom) Amanda Carreras	No. 352	1R	No. 205
Loss	2–2	2022	US Open	Grand Slam	Hard	(Brazil) Beatriz Haddad Maia	No. 15	1R	No. 117

Sporting positions
Preceded by (Estonia) Anett Kontaveit	Orange Bowl Girls' singles champion Category: 18 and under 2012	Succeeded by (Russia) Varvara Flink
