= 2019 Fed Cup Europe/Africa Zone Group I – Pool B (Bath) =

Subsection of tennis competition

Pool B (Bath) of the 2019 Fed Cup Europe/Africa Zone Group I is one of four pools in the Europe/Africa zone of the 2019 Fed Cup. Four teams competed in a round robin competition, with the top team and the bottom team proceeding to their respective sections of the play-offs: the top team played for advancement to the World Group II Play-offs, while the bottom team faced potential relegation to Group II.

== Standings ==
		SRB	CRO	TUR	GEO	RR; W–L	Set; W–L	Game; W–L	Standings
4	Serbia		2–1	3–0	2–1	3–0	15–7 (68%)	112–86 (57%)	1
5	Croatia	1–2		2–1	2–1	2–1	14–9 (61%)	117–102 (53%)	2
10	Turkey	0–3	1–2		3–0	1–2	9–11 (45%)	91–92 (50%)	3
14	Georgia	1–2	1–2	0–3		0–3	4–15 (21%)	69–109 (39%)	4

Standings are determined by: 1. number of wins; 2. number of matches; 3. in two-team ties, head-to-head records; 4. in three-team ties, (a) percentage of sets won (head-to-head records if two teams remain tied), then (b) percentage of games won (head-to-head records if two teams remain tied), then (c) Fed Cup rankings.

== Round-robin ==
=== Serbia vs. Georgia ===
Serbia
2
University of Bath, Bath, United Kingdom
6 February
Hard (indoor)

Georgia
1

			1	2	3
1	(Serbia) (Georgia (country))	Ivana Jorović; Mariam Bolkvadze	6; 3	6; 1
2	(Serbia) (Georgia (country))	Olga Danilović; Ekaterine Gorgodze	7; 5	6; 3
3	(Serbia) (Georgia (country))	Olga Danilović / Ivana Jorović; Mariam Bolkvadze / Oksana Kalashnikova	3; 6	5; 7

=== Croatia vs. Turkey ===
Croatia
2
University of Bath, Bath, United Kingdom
6 February
Hard (indoor)

Turkey
1

			1	2	3
1	(Croatia) (Turkey)	Ana Konjuh; Çağla Büyükakçay	5; 7	6; 2	3; 6
2	(Croatia) (Turkey)	Donna Vekić; Pemra Özgen	7^{7} 6^{0}	6; 3
3	(Croatia) (Turkey)	Jana Fett / Darija Jurak; Çağla Büyükakçay / Pemra Özgen	6; 4	6; 4

=== Serbia vs. Turkey ===
Serbia
3
University of Bath, Bath, United Kingdom
7 February
Hard (indoor)

Turkey
0

			1	2	3
1	(Serbia) (Turkey)	Ivana Jorović; Çağla Büyükakçay	6; 2	6; 3
2	(Serbia) (Turkey)	Aleksandra Krunić; Pemra Özgen	3; 6	6; 4	6; 2
3	(Serbia) (Turkey)	Olga Danilović / Aleksandra Krunić; Berfu Cengiz / İpek Soylu	6; 2	6; 3

=== Croatia vs. Georgia ===
Croatia
2
University of Bath, Bath, United Kingdom
7 February
Hard (indoor)

Georgia
1

			1	2	3
1	(Croatia) (Georgia (country))	Ana Konjuh; Mariam Bolkvadze	6; 4	6; 3
2	(Croatia) (Georgia (country))	Jana Fett; Ekaterine Gorgodze	6; 4	3; 6	5; 7
3	(Croatia) (Georgia (country))	Darija Jurak / Ana Konjuh; Ekaterine Gorgodze / Oksana Kalashnikova	7; 5	6; 1

=== Serbia vs. Croatia ===
Serbia
2
University of Bath, Bath, United Kingdom
8 February
Hard (indoor)

Croatia
1

			1	2	3
1	(Serbia) (Croatia)	Olga Danilović; Jana Fett	2; 6	6; 2	7^{9} 6^{7}
2	(Serbia) (Croatia)	Aleksandra Krunić; Donna Vekić	6; 1	5; 7	1; 6
3	(Serbia) (Croatia)	Olga Danilović / Aleksandra Krunić; Darija Jurak / Ana Konjuh	1; 6	6; 1	6; 4

=== Turkey vs. Georgia ===
Turkey
3
University of Bath, Bath, United Kingdom
8 February
Hard (indoor)

Georgia
0

			1	2	3
1	(Turkey) (Georgia (country))	Çağla Büyükakçay; Mariam Bolkvadze	6; 4	6; 1
2	(Turkey) (Georgia (country))	Pemra Özgen; Ekaterine Gorgodze	7^{8} 6^{6}	6; 3
3	(Turkey) (Georgia (country))	Pemra Özgen / İpek Soylu; Ekaterine Gorgodze / Oksana Kalashnikova	6; 0	6; 0		w/o
