= 2022 Billie Jean King Cup Europe/Africa Zone Group I – Pool B =

Subsection of tennis competition

Pool B of the 2022 Billie Jean King Cup Europe/Africa Zone Group I was one of two pools in the Europe/Africa zone of the 2020–21 Billie Jean King Cup. Six teams competed in a round robin competition, with the top teams and the bottom team proceeding to their respective sections of the play-offs: the top teams played for advancement to 2022 Billie Jean King Cup Play-offs.

== Standings ==
		SLO	CRO	AUT	BUL	SWE	GEO	RR; W–L	Set; W–L	Game; W–L	Standings
9	Slovenia		2–1	2–1	2–1	1–2	2–1	9–6	20–13 (61%)	159–133 (54%)	1
4	Croatia	1–2		2–1	3–0	3–0	3–0	12–3	25–7 (78%)	170–116 (59%)	2
6	Austria	1–2	1–2		2–1	2–1	3–0	9–6	20–15 (57%)	177–141 (56%)	3
8	Bulgaria	1–2	0–3	1–2		3–0	2–1	7–8	14–20 (41%)	142–143 (50%)	4
2	Sweden	2–1	0–3	1–2	0–3		3–0	6–9	15–18 (45%)	127–153 (45%)	5
11	Georgia	1–2	0–3	0–3	1–2	0–3		2–13	6–27 (18%)	100–189 (35%)	6

Standings are determined by: 1. number of wins; 2. number of matches; 3. in two-team ties, head-to-head records; 4. in three-team ties, (a) percentage of matches won (head-to-head records if two teams remain tied), then (b) percentage of sets won (head-to-head records if two teams remain tied), then (c) percentage of games won (head-to-head records if two teams remain tied), then (d) Billie Jean King Cup rankings.

== Round-robin ==
=== Sweden vs. Croatia ===
Sweden
0
Megasaray Tennis Academy, Antalya, Turkey
11 April 2022
Clay

Croatia
3

			1	2	3
1	(Sweden) (Croatia)	Jacqueline Cabaj Awad; Petra Marčinko	0; 6	4; 6
2	(Sweden) (Croatia)	Caijsa Hennemann; Ana Konjuh	1; 6	3; 6
3	(Sweden) (Croatia)	Fanny Östlund / Kajsa Rinaldo Persson; Petra Martić / Donna Vekić	2; 6	4; 6

=== Austria vs. Bulgaria ===
Austria
2
Megasaray Tennis Academy, Antalya, Turkey
11 April 2022
Clay

Bulgaria
1

			1	2	3
1	(Austria) (Bulgaria)	Sinja Kraus; Julia Terziyska	6; 1	6; 4
2	(Austria) (Bulgaria)	Julia Grabher; Isabella Shinikova	6; 2	6; 3
3	(Austria) (Bulgaria)	Barbara Haas / Sinja Kraus; Isabella Shinikova / Julia Terziyska	7^{8} 6^{6}	2; 6	4; 6

=== Slovenia vs. Georgia ===
Slovenia
2
Megasaray Tennis Academy, Antalya, Turkey
11 April 2022
Clay

Georgia
1

			1	2	3
1	(Slovenia) (Georgia (country))	Kaja Juvan; Zoziya Kardava	7; 5	6; 1
2	(Slovenia) (Georgia (country))	Tamara Zidanšek; Mariam Bolkvadze	6; 3	6; 0
3	(Slovenia) (Georgia (country))	Živa Falkner / Pia Lovrič; Mariam Bolkvadze / Oksana Kalashnikova	6; 3	6^{5} 7^{7}	4; 6

=== Sweden vs. Georgia ===
Sweden
3
Megasaray Tennis Academy, Antalya, Turkey
12 April 2022
Clay

Georgia
0

			1	2	3
1	(Sweden) (Georgia (country))	Jacqueline Cabaj Awad; Tamari Gagoshidze	6; 1	6; 3
2	(Sweden) (Georgia (country))	Caijsa Hennemann; Mariam Bolkvadze	6; 2	6; 0
3	(Sweden) (Georgia (country))	Jacqueline Cabaj Awad / Kajsa Rinaldo Persson; Tamari Gagoshidze / Zoziya Kardava	6; 2	7^{8} 6^{6}

=== Croatia vs. Bulgaria ===
Croatia
3
Megasaray Tennis Academy, Antalya, Turkey
12 April 2022
Clay

Bulgaria
0

			1	2	3
1	(Croatia) (Bulgaria)	Petra Marčinko; Julia Terziyska	6; 4	6; 4
2	(Croatia) (Bulgaria)	Petra Martić; Isabella Shinikova	6; 3	6; 1
3	(Croatia) (Bulgaria)	Ana Konjuh / Donna Vekić; Rositsa Dencheva / Yoana Konstantinova	6; 2	6; 1

=== Austria vs. Slovenia ===
Austria
1
Megasaray Tennis Academy, Antalya, Turkey
12 April 2022
Clay

Slovenia
2

			1	2	3
1	(Austria) (Slovenia)	Sinja Kraus; Kaja Juvan	1; 6	4; 6
2	(Austria) (Slovenia)	Julia Grabher; Tamara Zidanšek	6; 3	6; 3
3	(Austria) (Slovenia)	Melanie Klaffner / Sinja Kraus; Kaja Juvan / Tamara Zidanšek	6; 2	4; 6	2; 6

=== Sweden vs. Bulgaria ===
Sweden
0
Megasaray Tennis Academy, Antalya, Turkey
13 April 2022
Clay

Bulgaria
3

			1	2	3
1	(Sweden) (Bulgaria)	Jacqueline Cabaj Awad; Isabella Shinikova	0; 6	6; 3	5; 7
2	(Sweden) (Bulgaria)	Caijsa Hennemann; Viktoriya Tomova	1; 6	1; 6
3	(Sweden) (Bulgaria)	Kajsa Rinaldo Persson / Julita Saner; Julia Terziyska / Viktoriya Tomova	1; 6	6; 2	0; 6

=== Croatia vs. Slovenia ===
Croatia
1
Megasaray Tennis Academy, Antalya, Turkey
13 April 2022
Clay

Slovenia
2

			1	2	3
1	(Croatia) (Slovenia)	Ana Konjuh; Kaja Juvan	2; 6	5; 7
2	(Croatia) (Slovenia)	Petra Martić; Tamara Zidanšek	3; 6	2; 6
3	(Croatia) (Slovenia)	Petra Martić / Donna Vekić; Pia Lovrič / Lara Smejkal	6; 4	6; 4

=== Austria vs. Georgia ===
Austria
3
Megasaray Tennis Academy, Antalya, Turkey
13 April 2022
Clay

Georgia
0

			1	2	3
1	(Austria) (Georgia (country))	Sinja Kraus; Nino Natsvlishvili	6; 4	6; 2
2	(Austria) (Georgia (country))	Julia Grabher; Zoziya Kardava	6; 0	6; 1
3	(Austria) (Georgia (country))	Barbara Haas / Melanie Klaffner; Tamari Gagoshidze / Nino Natsvlishvili	6; 4	4; 6	6; 3

=== Sweden vs. Austria ===
Sweden
1
Megasaray Tennis Academy, Antalya, Turkey
14 April 2022
Clay

Austria
2

			1	2	3
1	(Sweden) (Austria)	Jacqueline Cabaj Awad; Sinja Kraus	2; 6	2; 6
2	(Sweden) (Austria)	Caijsa Hennemann; Julia Grabher	7^{7} 6^{2}	7; 5
3	(Sweden) (Austria)	Caijsa Hennemann / Kajsa Rinaldo Persson; Melanie Klaffner / Sinja Kraus	6; 4	5; 7	0; 6

=== Croatia vs. Georgia ===
Croatia
3
Megasaray Tennis Academy, Antalya, Turkey
14 April 2022
Clay

Georgia
0

			1	2	3
1	(Croatia) (Georgia (country))	Petra Marčinko; Nino Natsvlishvili	6; 2	6; 2
2	(Croatia) (Georgia (country))	Donna Vekić; Mariam Bolkvadze	6; 2	6; 4
3	(Croatia) (Georgia (country))	Ana Konjuh / Tara Würth; Mariam Bolkvadze / Oksana Kalashnikova	5; 7	7^{7} 6^{2}		retired

=== Bulgaria vs. Slovenia ===
Bulgaria
1
Megasaray Tennis Academy, Antalya, Turkey
14 April 2022
Clay

Slovenia
2

			1	2	3
1	(Bulgaria) (Slovenia)	Isabella Shinikova; Pia Lovrič	4; 6	4; 6
2	(Bulgaria) (Slovenia)	Viktoriya Tomova; Kaja Juvan	1; 6	2; 6
3	(Bulgaria) (Slovenia)	Isabella Shinikova / Julia Terziyska; Živa Falkner / Lara Smejkal	6; 0	5; 7	6; 1

=== Sweden vs. Slovenia ===
Sweden
2
Megasaray Tennis Academy, Antalya, Turkey
15 April 2022
Clay

Slovenia
1

			1	2	3
1	(Sweden) (Slovenia)	Kajsa Rinaldo Persson; Pia Lovrič	6; 2			retired
2	(Sweden) (Slovenia)	Julita Saner; Živa Falkner	1; 6	2; 6
3	(Sweden) (Slovenia)	Jacqueline Cabaj Awad / Caijsa Hennemann; Živa Falkner / Lara Smejkal	6; 4	6; 3

=== Croatia vs. Austria ===
Croatia
2
Megasaray Tennis Academy, Antalya, Turkey
15 April 2022
Clay

Austria
1

			1	2	3
1	(Croatia) (Austria)	Donna Vekić; Sinja Kraus	7; 5	6; 3
2	(Croatia) (Austria)	Petra Martić; Julia Grabher	6; 2	6; 4
3	(Croatia) (Austria)	Petra Marčinko / Tara Würth; Barbara Haas / Melanie Klaffner	7; 5			retired

=== Bulgaria vs. Georgia ===
Bulgaria
2
Megasaray Tennis Academy, Antalya, Turkey
15 April 2022
Clay

Georgia
1

			1	2	3
1	(Bulgaria) (Georgia (country))	Julia Terziyska; Tamari Gagoshidze	6; 1	6; 1
2	(Bulgaria) (Georgia (country))	Viktoriya Tomova; Mariam Bolkvadze	6; 3			retired
3	(Bulgaria) (Georgia (country))	Rositsa Dencheva / Yoana Konstantinova; Tamari Gagoshidze / Zoziya Kardava	5; 7	0; 6
