= 2013 Fed Cup Europe/Africa Zone Group I – play-offs =

The play-offs of the 2013 Fed Cup Europe/Africa Zone Group I were the final stages of the Group I Zonal Competition involving teams from Europe and Africa. Using the positions determined in their pools, the fifteen teams faced off to determine their placing in the 2013 Fed Cup Europe/Africa Zone Group I. The top two teams advanced to World Group II play-offs, and the bottom two teams were relegated down to the Europe/Africa Zone Group II.

== Pool results ==
Placing	Pool A	Pool B	Pool C	Pool D
1	Croatia	Great Britain	Poland	Bulgaria
2	Belarus	Hungary	Israel	Netherlands
3	Austria	Portugal	Romania	Slovenia
4	Georgia	Bosnia and Herzegovina	Turkey	Luxembourg

== Promotional play-offs ==
The first placed teams of each pool were drawn in head-to-head rounds. The winner of each round advanced to the World Group II play-offs.

=== Croatia vs. Poland ===
Croatia
1
Municipal Tennis Club, Eilat, Israel
9 February 2013
Hard (outdoors)

Poland
2

			1	2	3
1	(Croatia) (Poland)	Ana Konjuh; Urszula Radwańska	2; 6	6; 3	7^{8} 6^{6}
2	(Croatia) (Poland)	Donna Vekić; Agnieszka Radwańska	3; 6	2; 6
3	(Croatia) (Poland)	Darija Jurak / Ana Konjuh; Agnieszka Radwańska / Urszula Radwańska	2; 6	4; 6

=== Great Britain vs. Bulgaria ===
Great Britain
2
Municipal Tennis Club, Eilat, Israel
10 February 2013
Hard (outdoors)

Bulgaria
0

			1	2	3
1	(United Kingdom) (Bulgaria)	Laura Robson; Dia Evtimova	6; 0	6; 4
2	(United Kingdom) (Bulgaria)	Heather Watson; Tsvetana Pironkova	1; 6	6; 4	6; 2
3	(United Kingdom) (Bulgaria)	Laura Robson / Heather Watson; Tsvetana Pironkova / Elitsa Kostova				not played

== 5th to 8th play-offs ==
The second placed teams of each pool were drawn in head-to-head rounds to find the equal fifth and seventh placed teams.

=== Belarus vs. Israel ===
Belarus
0
Municipal Tennis Club, Eilat, Israel
9 February 2013
Hard (outdoors)

Israel
2

			1	2	3
1	(Belarus) (Israel)	Lidziya Marozava; Julia Glushko	2; 6	4; 6
2	(Belarus) (Israel)	Ilona Kremen; Shahar Pe'er	3; 6	2; 6
3	(Belarus) (Israel)	Aliaksandra Sasnovich / Lidziya Marozava; Shahar Pe'er / Julia Glushko				not played

=== Hungary vs. Netherlands ===
Hungary
2
Municipal Tennis Club, Eilat, Israel
10 February 2013
Hard (outdoors)

Netherlands
0

			1	2	3
1	(Hungary) (Netherlands)	Réka-Luca Jani; Bibiane Schoofs	6; 3	2; 6	6; 3
2	(Hungary) (Netherlands)	Tímea Babos; Richèl Hogenkamp	6; 2	6; 3
3	(Hungary) (Netherlands)	Tímea Babos / Réka-Luca Jani; Bibiane Schoofs / Angelique van der Meet				not played

== 9th to 12th play-offs ==
The third placed teams of each pool were drawn in head-to-head rounds to find the equal ninth and the eleventh placed teams.

=== Austria vs. Romania ===
Austria
2
Municipal Tennis Club, Eilat, Israel
9 February 2013
Hard (outdoors)

Romania
1

			1	2	3
1	(Austria) (Romania)	Melanie Klaffner; Cristina Dinu	6; 0	6; 3
2	(Austria) (Romania)	Nicole Rottmann; Raluca Olaru	6^{3} 7^{7}	1; 6
3	(Austria) (Romania)	Nicole Rottmann / Melanie Klaffner; Cristina Dinu / Raluca Olaru	6; 3	6; 2

=== Portugal vs. Slovenia ===
The play-off tie between Portugal and Slovenia did not take place.

== Relegation play-offs ==
The last placed teams of each pool were drawn in head-to-head rounds. The loser of each round was relegated down to Europe/Africa Zone Group II in 2014.

=== Georgia vs. Turkey ===
Georgia
1
Municipal Tennis Club, Eilat, Israel
9 February 2013
Hard (outdoors)

Turkey
2

			1	2	3
1	(Georgia (country)) (Turkey)	Sofia Kvatsabaia; Başak Eraydın	0; 6	3; 6
2	(Georgia (country)) (Turkey)	Sofia Shapatava; Çağla Büyükakçay	7; 5	6; 3
3	(Georgia (country)) (Turkey)	Sofia Shapatava / Margalita Chakhnashvili; Çağla Büyükakçay / Pemra Özgen	5; 7	2; 6

=== Bosnia and Herzegovina vs. Luxembourg ===
Bosnia and Herzegovina
0
Municipal Tennis Club, Eilat, Israel
10 February 2013
Hard (outdoors)

Luxembourg
2

			1	2	3
1	(Bosnia and Herzegovina) (Luxembourg)	Anita Husarić; Claudine Schaul	6; 4	4; 6	3; 6
2	(Bosnia and Herzegovina) (Luxembourg)	Jelena Simić; Anne Kremer	7^{7} 6^{3}	3; 6	1; 6
3	(Bosnia and Herzegovina) (Luxembourg)	Anita Husarić / Jasmina Kajtazovič; Anne Kremer / Claudine Schaul				not played

== Final placements ==
Placing	Teams	
Promoted	Poland	Great Britain
Third	Croatia	Bulgaria
Fifth	Israel	Hungary
Seventh	Belarus	Netherlands
Ninth	Austria	Portugal
Eleventh	Romania	Slovenia
Twelfth	Turkey	Luxembourg
Relegated	Georgia	Bosnia and Herzegovina

- Poland and Great Britain advanced to World Group II play-offs.
- Georgia and Bosnia and Herzegovina were relegated to Europe/Africa Group II in 2014.

== See also ==
- Fed Cup structure
