= Ilona Kremen =

Belarusian tennis player

Ilona Kremen Ілона Крамень
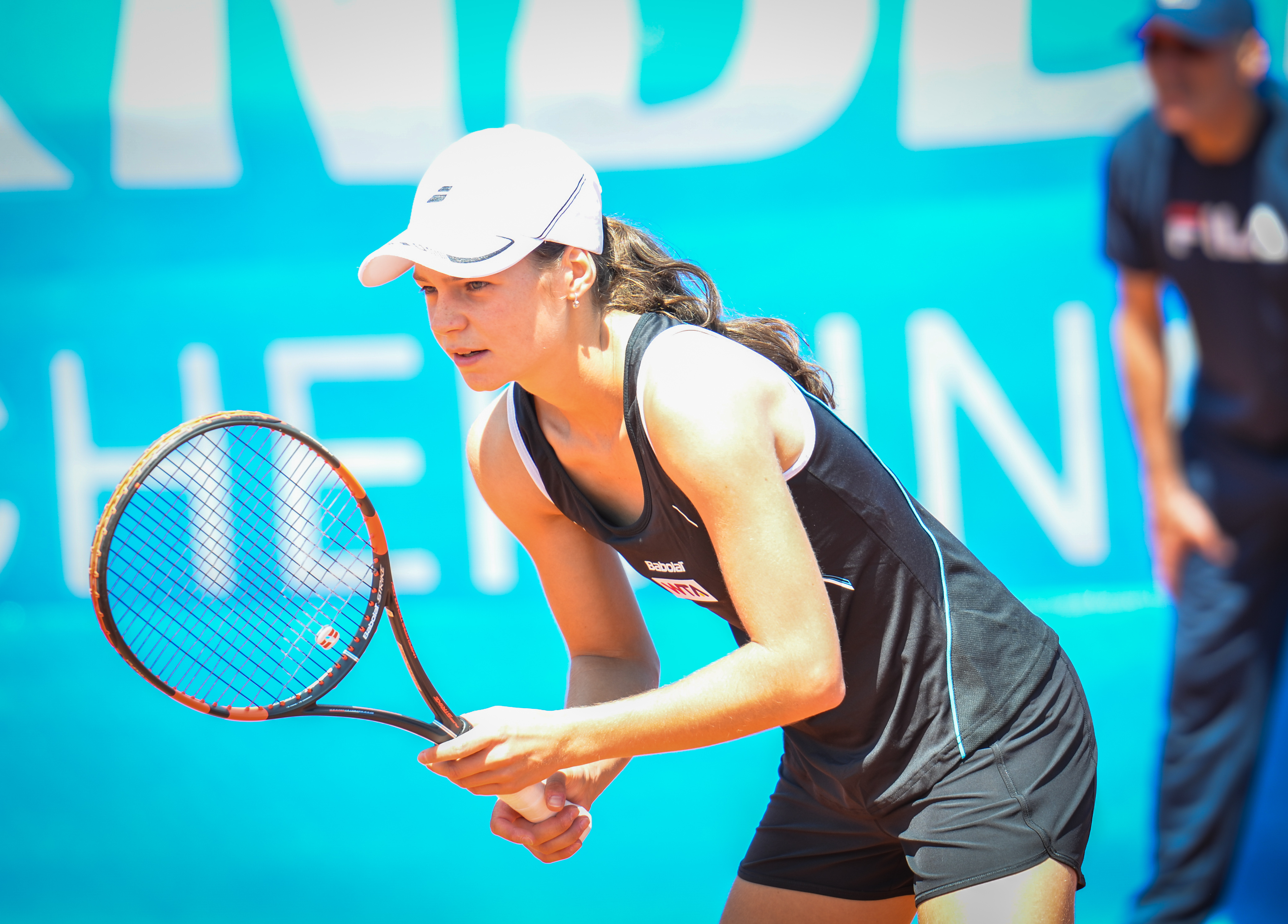
- Kremen at the 2014 Nürnberger Versicherungscup
- Full name: Ilona Eduardovna Kremen
- Country (sports): Belarus
- Born: 18 January 1994 (age 32) Minsk, Belarus
- Plays: Right-handed
- Prize money: $132,835

Singles
- Career record: 222–169
- Career titles: 4 ITF
- Highest ranking: No. 201 (24 June 2013)

Grand Slam singles results
- Australian Open: Q1 (2014)
- US Open: Q1 (2013)

Doubles
- Career record: 260–131
- Career titles: 29 ITF
- Highest ranking: No. 157 (21 July 2014)

Team competitions
- Fed Cup: 4–3

Ilona Eduardovna Kremen (Belarusian: Ілона Эдуардаўна Крамень, Russian: Ило́на Эдуа́рдовна Креме́нь; born 18 January 1994) is a Belarusian former tennis player.

In her career, she won four singles and 29 doubles titles on the ITF Circuit. On 24 June 2013, she reached her best singles ranking of world No. 201. On 21 July 2014, she peaked at No. 157 in the WTA doubles rankings.

Kremen won the Belarus National Open Championships in 2011.

On 6 February 2013, she made her debut for the Belarus Fed Cup team, winning her first international rubber after her Georgian opponent Sofia Shapatava retired in the third set of their tie.

== ITF Circuit finals ==
=== Singles: 7 (4 titles, 3 runner-ups) ===
| Legend $25,000 tournaments $15,000 tournaments $10,000 tournaments | Finals by surface Hard (0–1) Clay (3–2) Carpet (1–0) |

| Result | Date | Tournament | Surface | Opponent | Score |
|---|---|---|---|---|---|
| Win | Aug 2011 | ITF Vienna, Austria | Clay | (Czech Republic) Kateřina Vaňková | 6–1, 6–1 |
| Win | Nov 2011 | ITF Antalya, Turkey | Clay | (Belarus) Ksenia Milevskaya | 7–6^{(6)}, 6–7^{(4)}, 6–1 |
| Win | Jun 2013 | ITF Ağrı, Turkey | Carpet | (Montenegro) Ana Veselinović | 6–4, 6–4 |
| Loss | Nov 2013 | ITF Astana, Kazakhstan | Hard (i) | (Ukraine) Nadiia Kichenok | 3–6, 1–6 |
| Loss | Apr 2016 | ITF Shymkent, Kazakhstan | Clay | (Russia) Anna Kalinskaya | 4–6, 2–6 |
| Win | Aug 2016 | ITF Kharkiv, Ukraine | Clay | (Ukraine) Anastasiya Fedoryshyn | 6–1, 7–5 |
| Loss | Jun 2017 | ITF Minsk, Belarus | Clay | (Belarus) Iryna Shymanovich | 1–6, 6–4, 2–6 |

=== Doubles: 53 (29 titles, 24 runner-ups) ===
| Legend $50/60,000 tournaments $25,000 tournaments $15,000 tournaments $10,000 tournaments | Finals by surface Hard (6–5) Clay (23–18) Carpet (0–1) |

| Outcome | No. | Date | Tournament | Tier | Surface | Partner | Opponents | Score |
|---|---|---|---|---|---|---|---|---|
| Winner | 1. | 21 March 2011 | ITF Antalya, Turkey | 10,000 | Clay | (Netherlands) Demi Schuurs | (Bulgaria) Martina Gledacheva (Bulgaria) Isabella Shinikova | 3–6, 7–6^{(3)}, [10–8] |
| Winner | 2. | 8 August 2011 | ITF Innsbruck, Austria | 10,000 | Clay | (Russia) Victoria Kan | (Austria) Patricia Haas (Austria) Veronika Sepp | 2–6, 6–3, [10–5] |
| Winner | 3. | 22 August 2011 | ITF Pörtschach, Austria | 10,000 | Clay | (Russia) Victoria Kan | (Austria) Pia König (Austria) Yvonne Neuwirth | 6–1, 6–3 |
| Runner-up | 1. | 12 December 2011 | ITF Antalya, Turkey | 10,000 | Clay | (Turkey) Başak Eraydın | (Italy) Gioia Barbieri (Italy) Giulia Pasini | 6–7^{(6)}, 6–4, [5–10] |
| Runner-up | 2. | 30 January 2012 | ITF Antalya | 10,000 | Clay | (Japan) Emi Mutaguchi | (Romania) Diana Enache (Netherlands) Daniëlle Harmsen | 0–6, 6–1, [6–10] |
| Runner-up | 3. | 13 February 2012 | ITF Rabat, Morocco | 25,000 | Clay | (Italy) Anastasia Grymalska | (Slovakia) Jana Čepelová (Hungary) Réka Luca Jani | 7–6^{(4)}, 1–6, [4–10] |
| Runner-up | 4. | 12 March 2012 | ITF Astana, Kazakhstan | 10,000 | Hard (i) | (Uzbekistan) Albina Khabibulina | (Russia) Eugeniya Pashkova (Ukraine) Anastasiya Vasylyeva | 5–7, 2–6 |
| Runner-up | 5. | 19 March 2012 | ITF Almaty, Kazakhstan | 25,000 | Hard (i) | (Uzbekistan) Albina Khabibulina | (Georgia (country)) Oksana Kalashnikova (Russia) Eugeniya Pashkova | 1–6, 5–7 |
| Runner-up | 6. | 18 June 2012 | ITF Kristinehamn, Sweden | 25,000 | Clay | (Belarus) Viktoryia Kisialeva | (Russia) Elena Bovina (Russia) Valeria Solovyeva | 2–6, 2–6 |
| Runner-up | 7. | 20 August 2012 | ITF Charleroi, Belgium | 25,000 | Clay | (Latvia) Diāna Marcinkēviča | (France) Séverine Beltrame (France) Laura Thorpe | 6–3, 4–6, [7–10] |
| Runner-up | 8. | 21 January 2013 | ITF Eilat, Israel | 10,000 | Hard | (Turkey) Pemra Özgen | (Russia) Alla Kudryavtseva (Romania) Raluca Olaru | 3–6, 3–6 |
| Winner | 4. | 1 April 2013 | ITF Jackson, United States | 25,000 | Clay | (Netherlands) Angelique van der Meet | (Bolivia) María Fernanda Álvarez Terán (Paraguay) Verónica Cepede Royg | 6–3, 6–4 |
| Winner | 5. | 11 November 2013 | ITF Minsk, Belarus | 25,000 | Hard (i) | (Belarus) Aliaksandra Sasnovich | (Kazakhstan) Anna Danilina (Russia) Olga Doroshina | 7–6^{(3)}, 6–0 |
| Runner-up | 9. | 7 April 2014 | ITF Pelham, United States | 25,000 | Clay | (Bulgaria) Dia Evtimova | (United States) Danielle Lao (United States) Keri Wong | 6–1, 4–6, [7–10] |
| Winner | 6. | Apr 2014 | Dothan Classic, United States | 50,000 | Clay | (Estonia) Anett Kontaveit | (United States) Shelby Rogers (Australia) Olivia Rogowska | 6–1, 5–7, [10–5] |
| Winner | 7. | 16 June 2014 | ITF Minsk, Belarus | 25,000 | Clay | (Russia) Irina Khromacheva | (Belarus) Lidziya Marozava (Belarus) Sviatlana Pirazhenka | 7–5, 6–0 |
| Winner | 8. | 18 August 2014 | ITF St. Petersburg, Russia | 25,000 | Clay | (Russia) Vitalia Diatchenko | (Russia) Natela Dzalamidze (Russia) Anastasia Pivovarova | 6–1, 6–3 |
| Winner | 9. | 10 November 2014 | ITF Minsk, Belarus | 25,000 | Hard (i) | (Belarus) Lidziya Marozava | (Russia) Olga Doroshina (Georgia (country)) Sofia Shapatava | 6–3, 6–4 |
| Winner | 10. | 24 August 2015 | ITF Bagnatica, Italy | 15,000 | Clay | (Italy) Anastasia Grymalska | (Italy) Alice Balducci (France) Sherazad Reix | 6–4, 6–2 |
| Winner | 11. | 11 January 2016 | ITF Hammamet, Tunisia | 10,000 | Clay | (Italy) Corinna Dentoni | (Canada) Petra Januskova (Italy) Angelica Moratelli | 7–6^{(2)}, 5–7, [10–5] |
| Winner | 12. | 18 January 2016 | ITF Hammamet | 10,000 | Clay | (Italy) Anastasia Grymalska | (Canada) Petra Januskova (Italy) Angelica Moratelli | 7–6^{(5)}, 6–1 |
| Runner-up | 10. | 25 January 2016 | ITF Hammamet | 10,000 | Clay | (Italy) Anastasia Grymalska | (Russia) Nika Kukharchuk (Moldova) Alexandra Perper | 3–6, 5–7 |
| Winner | 13. | 18 April 2016 | ITF Shymkent, Kazakhstan | 10,000 | Clay | (Belarus) Sviatlana Pirazhenka | (Russia) Anastasia Frolova (Kazakhstan) Kamila Kerimbayeva | 4–6, 7–6^{(4)}, [10–8] |
| Winner | 14. | 25 April 2016 | ITF Shymkent | 10,000 | Clay | (Belarus) Sviatlana Pirazhenka | (Russia) Anastasia Frolova (Kazakhstan) Kamila Kerimbayeva | 6–3, 6–4 |
| Runner-up | 11. | 6 June 2016 | ITF Minsk, Belarus | 25,000 | Clay | (Belarus) Iryna Shymanovich | (Norway) Ulrikke Eikeri (Brazil) Laura Pigossi | 2–6, 4–6 |
| Runner-up | 12. | 8 August 2016 | ITF Koksijde, Belgium | 25,000 | Clay | (Turkey) Başak Eraydın | (Belgium) Steffi Distelmans (Netherlands) Demi Schuurs | 1–6, 4–6 |
| Runner-up | 13. | 15 August 2016 | ITF Kharkiv, Ukraine | 10,000 | Clay | (Ukraine) Ganna Poznikhirenko | (Ukraine) Veronika Kapshay (Ukraine) Anastasiya Shoshyna | 6–4, 4–6, [9–11] |
| Runner-up | 14. | 22 August 2016 | ITF Kharkiv | 25,000 | Clay | (Turkey) Başak Eraydın | (Russia) Valentyna Ivakhnenko (Russia) Anastasiya Komardina | 1–6, 3–6 |
| Winner | 15. | 5 September 2016 | ITF Bucha, Ukraine | 10,000 | Clay | (Ukraine) Ganna Poznikhirenko | (Ukraine) Veronika Kapshay (Ukraine) Anastasiya Shoshyna | 6–3, 6–2 |
| Runner-up | 15. | 7 November 2016 | ITF Minsk, Belarus | 25,000 | Hard (i) | (Belarus) Vera Lapko | (Russia) Anna Kalinskaya (Belarus) Nika Shytkouskaya | 2–6, 3–6 |
| Runner-up | 16. | 14 November 2016 | ITF Zawada, Poland | 25,000 | Carpet (i) | (Belarus) Vera Lapko | (Poland) Justyna Jegiołka (Latvia) Diāna Marcinkēviča | 4–6, 5–7 |
| Winner | 16. | 3 February 2017 | Open de l'Isère, France | 25,000 | Hard (i) | (Czech Republic) Tereza Smitková | (Romania) Alexandra Cadanțu (Sweden) Cornelia Lister | 6–1, 7–5 |
| Winner | 17. | 27 February 2017 | ITF Mâcon, France | 15,000 | Hard (i) | (Latvia) Diāna Marcinkēviča | (Italy) Alice Matteucci (Italy) Camilla Rosatello | 6–7^{(5)}, 7–6^{(1)}, [10–4] |
| Runner-up | 17. | 12 March 2017 | ITF Amiens, France | 15,000 | Clay (i) | (Latvia) Diāna Marcinkēviča | (Italy) Camilla Rosatello (Norway) Melanie Stokke | 4–6, 1–6 |
| Winner | 18. | 19 March 2017 | ITF Gonesse, France | 15,000 | Clay (i) | (Latvia) Diāna Marcinkēviča | (Ukraine) Ganna Poznikhirenko (Russia) Ekaterina Yashina | 6–1, 6–4 |
| Winner | 19. | 15 April 2017 | ITF Shymkent, Kazakhstan | 15,000 | Clay | (Russia) Yana Sizikova | (Russia) Anastasia Gasanova (Russia) Anastasia Pribylova | 6–4, 6–1 |
| Winner | 20. | 23 April 2017 | ITF Shymkent | 15,000 | Clay | (Russia) Yana Sizikova | (Ukraine) Veronika Kapshay (Moldova) Alexandra Perper | 7–6^{(2)}, 6–1 |
| Runner-up | 18. | 19 May 2017 | ITF Båstad, Sweden | 25,000 | Clay | (Sweden) Cornelia Lister | (Belgium) An-Sophie Mestach (Belgium) Kimberley Zimmermann | 6–4, 2–6, [5–10] |
| Runner-up | 19. | Jun 2017 | ITF Brescia, Italy | 60,000 | Clay | (Paraguay) Montserrat González | (Israel) Julia Glushko (Australia) Priscilla Hon | 6–2, 6–7^{(4)}, [8–10] |
| Winner | 21. | 16 June 2017 | ITF Minsk, Belarus | 15,000 | Clay | (Russia) Daria Kruzhkova | (Belarus) Viktoryia Mun (Belarus) Vera Sakalouskaya | 6–0, 6–3 |
| Runner-up | 20. | 15 July 2017 | ITF Moscow, Russia | 25,000 | Clay | (Belarus) Iryna Shymanovich | (Uzbekistan) Akgul Amanmuradova (Russia) Valentyna Ivakhnenko | 4–6, 2–6 |
| Winner | 22. | 13 August 2017 | ITF Moscow | 15,000 | Clay | (Belarus) Iryna Shymanovich | (Russia) Elina Avanesyan (Russia) Avelina Sayfetdinova | 6–4, 6–4 |
| Winner | 23. | 19 August 2017 | ITF Moscow | 15,000 | Clay | (Belarus) Iryna Shymanovich | (Russia) Aleksandra Kuznetsova (Russia) Sofya Lansere | 6–2, 6–0 |
| Runner-up | 21. | 14 January 2018 | ITF Daytona Beach, US | 25,000 | Clay | (Norway) Ulrikke Eikeri | (United States) Usue Maitane Arconada (Chile) Alexa Guarachi | 3–6, 4–6 |
| Runner-up | 22. | 20 January 2018 | ITF Orlando, US | 25,000 | Clay | (Norway) Ulrikke Eikeri | (China) Guo Hanyu (Chinese Taipei) Hsu Ching-wen | 3–6, 6–3, [10–12] |
| Winner | 24. | 27 January 2018 | ITF Wesley Chapel, US | 25,000 | Clay | (Norway) Ulrikke Eikeri | (Chinese Taipei) Hsu Ching-wen (China) Zheng Wushuang | 6–2, 6–3 |
| Runner-up | 23. | 10 March 2018 | ITF Orlando, US | 15,000 | Clay | (Bulgaria) Dia Evtimova | (United States) Caty McNally (United States) Whitney Osuigwe | 2–6, 3–6 |
| Winner | 25. | 28 April 2018 | ITF Antalya, Turkey | 15,000 | Clay | (Czech Republic) Kateřina Vaňková | (Czech Republic) Magdaléna Pantůčková (Belgium) Eliessa Vanlangendonck | 7–5, 6–0 |
| Winner | 26. | 5 May 2018 | ITF Antalya | 15,000 | Clay | (Japan) Haruna Arakawa | (China) Zhuoma Ni Ma (China) Zhuoma You Mi | w/o |
| Winner | 27. | 12 May 2018 | ITF Antalya | 15,000 | Clay | (Japan) Haruna Arakawa | (Romania) Alexandra Diana Braga (Romania) Oana Georgeta Simion | 6–0, 6–1 |
| Winner | 28. | 1 June 2018 | ITF Andijan, Uzbekistan | 25,000 | Hard | (Belarus) Iryna Shymanovich | (Russia) Anastasia Gasanova (Russia) Ekaterina Yashina | 6–4, 6–4 |
| Winner | 29. | 9 November 2018 | ITF Minsk, Belarus | 25,000 | Hard (i) | (Belarus) Iryna Shymanovich | (Russia) Polina Monova (Russia) Yana Sizikova | 6–3, 7–6^{(3)} |
| Runner-up | 24. | Apr 2019 | Lale Cup Istanbul, Turkey | W60 | Hard | (Belarus) Iryna Shymanovich | (Czech Republic) Marie Bouzková (Netherlands) Rosalie van der Hoek | 5–7, 7–6^{(2)}, [5–10] |

== Fed Cup participation ==
=== Singles (2–2) ===
| Edition | Stage | Date | Location | Against | Surface | Opponent | W/L | Score |
|---|---|---|---|---|---|---|---|---|
| 2013 Fed Cup; Europe/Africa Zone; Group I | R/R | 6 February 2013 | Eilat, Israel | (Georgia (country)) Georgia | Hard | (Georgia (country)) Sofia Shapatava | W | 6–3, 6–7^{(5)}, 3–0 ret. |
| 2013 Fed Cup; Europe/Africa Zone; Group I | R/R | 7 February 2013 | Eilat, Israel | Austria | Hard | (Austria) Yvonne Meusburger | W | 6–2, 2–6, 6–1 |
| 2013 Fed Cup; Europe/Africa Zone; Group I | R/R | 8 February 2013 | Eilat, Israel | Croatia | Hard | (Croatia) Donna Vekić | L | 1–6, 6–7^{(2–7)} |
| 2013 Fed Cup; Europe/Africa Zone; Group I | P/O | 9 February 2013 | Eilat, Israel | Israel | Hard | (Israel) Shahar Pe'er | L | 3–6, 2–6 |

=== Doubles (2–1) ===
| Edition | Stage | Date | Location | Against | Surface | Partner | Opponents | W/L | Score |
|---|---|---|---|---|---|---|---|---|---|
| 2014 Fed Cup; Europe/Africa Zone; Group I | R/R | 4 February 2014 | Budapest, Hungary | Turkey | Hard (i) | (Belarus) Iryna Shymanovich | (Turkey) Çağla Büyükakçay (Turkey) Pemra Özgen | W | 7–5, 6–1 |
| 2014 Fed Cup; Europe/Africa Zone; Group I | R/R | 6 February 2014 | Budapest, Hungary | Portugal | Hard (i) | (Belarus) Iryna Shymanovich | (Portugal) Michelle Larcher de Brito (Portugal) Bárbara Luz | W | 6–1, 6–0 |
| 2014 Fed Cup; Europe/Africa Zone; Group I | R/R | 7 February 2014 | Budapest, Hungary | Bulgaria | Hard (i) | (Belarus) Iryna Shymanovich | (Bulgaria) Elitsa Kostova (Bulgaria) Viktoriya Tomova | L | 6–4, 3–6, 5–7 |
