= 2017 Fed Cup Europe/Africa Zone Group I – Pool B =

Subsection of tennis competition

Pool B of the 2017 Fed Cup Europe/Africa Zone Group I was one of four pools in the Europe/Africa zone of the 2017 Fed Cup. Three teams competed in a round robin competition, with the top team and the bottom team proceeding to their respective sections of the play-offs: the top team played for advancement to the World Group II Play-offs, while the bottom team faced potential relegation to Group II.

== Standings ==
		CRO	HUN	BIH	RR; W–L	Set; W–L	Game; W–L	Standings
22	Croatia		2–1	3–0	2–0	10–3 (77%)	68–39 (64%)	1
31	Hungary	1–2		3–0	1–1	9–5 (64%)	64–58 (52%)	2
52	Bosnia and Herzegovina	0–3	0–3		0–2	1–12 (8%)	40–75 (38%)	3

Standings are determined by: 1. number of wins; 2. number of matches; 3. in two-team ties, head-to-head records; 4. in three-team ties, (a) percentage of sets won (head-to-head records if two teams remain tied), then (b) percentage of games won (head-to-head records if two teams remain tied), then (c) Fed Cup rankings.

== Round-robin ==
=== Croatia vs. Bosnia and Herzegovina ===
Croatia
3
Tallink Tennis Centre, Tallinn, Estonia
8 February 2017
Hard (indoors)

Bosnia and Herzegovina
0

			1	2	3
1	(Croatia) (Bosnia and Herzegovina)	Donna Vekić; Jelena Simić	6; 2	6; 1
2	(Croatia) (Bosnia and Herzegovina)	Ana Konjuh; Dea Herdželaš	6; 0	6; 2
3	(Croatia) (Bosnia and Herzegovina)	Darija Jurak / Tena Lukas; Dea Herdželaš / Anita Husarić	7^{8} 6^{6}	6; 2

=== Hungary vs. Bosnia and Herzegovina ===
Hungary
3
Tallink Tennis Centre, Tallinn, Estonia
9 February 2017
Hard (indoors)

Bosnia and Herzegovina
0

			1	2	3
1	(Hungary) (Bosnia and Herzegovina)	Dalma Gálfi; Jelena Simić	6; 4	1; 6	7; 5
2	(Hungary) (Bosnia and Herzegovina)	Tímea Babos; Dea Herdželaš	6; 4	6; 1
3	(Hungary) (Bosnia and Herzegovina)	Ágnes Bukta / Fanny Stollár; Dea Herdželaš / Anita Husarić	6; 4	6; 3

=== Croatia vs. Hungary ===
Croatia
2
Tallink Tennis Centre, Tallinn, Estonia
10 February 2017
Hard (indoors)

Hungary
1

			1	2	3
1	(Croatia) (Hungary)	Donna Vekić; Dalma Gálfi	6; 2	6; 0
2	(Croatia) (Hungary)	Ana Konjuh; Tímea Babos	1; 6	2; 6
3	(Croatia) (Hungary)	Darija Jurak / Ana Konjuh; Tímea Babos / Dalma Gálfi	7; 5	3; 6	6; 1
