= 2016 Qatar Total Open – Singles =

Singles
- 2016 Qatar Total Open

Final
- Champion: (Spain) Carla Suárez Navarro
- Runner-up: (Latvia) Jeļena Ostapenko
- Score: 1–6, 6–4, 6–4

Details
- Draw: 56 (8 Q / 3 WC )
- Seeds: 16

Events
Singles	Doubles
- Qatar Total Open

Carla Suárez Navarro defeated Jeļena Ostapenko in the final, 1–6, 6–4, 6–4 to win the singles tennis title at the 2016 WTA Qatar Open.

Lucie Šafářová was the defending champion, but lost to Çağla Büyükakçay in the second round.

== Seeds ==
The top eight seeds received a bye into the second round.

1. (Germany) Angelique Kerber (second round)
2. (Romania) Simona Halep (second round)
3. (Poland) Agnieszka Radwańska (semifinals)
4. (Spain) Garbiñe Muguruza (quarterfinals)
5. (Czech Republic) Petra Kvitová (third round)
6. (Switzerland) Belinda Bencic (second round)
7. (Czech Republic) Lucie Šafářová (second round)
8. (Spain) Carla Suárez Navarro (champion)

9. (Italy) Roberta Vinci (quarterfinals)
10. (Czech Republic) Karolína Plíšková (first round)
11. (Switzerland) Timea Bacsinszky (third round)
12. (Russia) Svetlana Kuznetsova (second round)
13. (Denmark) Caroline Wozniacki (third round)
14. (Serbia) Jelena Janković (second round)
15. (Ukraine) Elina Svitolina (first round)
16. (Italy) Sara Errani (second round)

Click on the seed number of a player to go to their draw section.

== Draw ==
Key

- Q = Qualifier
- WC = Wild card
- LL = Lucky loser
- Alt = Alternate
- ITF = ITF entry
- PR = Protected ranking
- SR = Special ranking
- SE = Special exempt
- JE = Junior exempt
- JR = Junior Accelerator Programme entrant
- CO = College Accelerator Programme entrant
- NG = Next Gen Accelerator Program entrant
- w/o = Walkover
- r = Retired
- d = Defaulted

=== Finals ===
Quarterfinals
(China) Zheng Saisai	4	3
(Latvia) Jeļena Ostapenko	6	6
4	(Spain) Garbiñe Muguruza	1	7	2
(Germany) Andrea Petkovic	6	5	6
9	(Italy) Roberta Vinci	6	2	3
3	(Poland) Agnieszka Radwańska	3	6	6
8	(Spain) Carla Suárez Navarro	6	7^{7}
Q	(Russia) Elena Vesnina	3	6^{3}

Semifinals
(Latvia) Jeļena Ostapenko	7	1
(Germany) Andrea Petkovic	5	0^{r}
3	(Poland) Agnieszka Radwańska	2	0
8	(Spain) Carla Suárez Navarro	6	6

Final
(Latvia) Jeļena Ostapenko	6	4	4
8	(Spain) Carla Suárez Navarro	1	6	6

=== Top half ===
==== Section 1 ====
First round
(China) S Zheng	6	7^{8}
(United States) V Lepchenko	2	6^{6}
Q	(Latvia) A Sevastova	7	3	6^{4}
WC	(Canada) E Bouchard	5	6	7^{7}
(Czech Republic) D Allertová	7	6
15	(Ukraine) E Svitolina	5	4
12	(Russia) S Kuznetsova	6	6
(Germany) J Görges	3	3
(Latvia) J Ostapenko	6	6
(Kazakhstan) Z Diyas	1	3
(France) K Mladenovic	3	4
(Czech Republic) B Strýcová	6	6

Second round
1	(Germany) A Kerber	5	1
(China) S Zheng	7	6
WC	(Canada) E Bouchard	7^{7}	7
(Czech Republic) D Allertová	6^{0}	5
12	(Russia) S Kuznetsova	6^{5}	0
(Latvia) J Ostapenko	7^{7}	6
(Czech Republic) B Strýcová	6^{2}	4
5	(Czech Republic) P Kvitová	7^{7}	6

Third round
(China) S Zheng	7^{7}	6
WC	(Canada) E Bouchard	6^{1}	1
(Latvia) J Ostapenko	5	6	6
5	(Czech Republic) P Kvitová	7	2	1

Quarterfinals
(China) S Zheng	4	3
(Latvia) J Ostapenko	6	6

==== Section 2 ====
First round
(Kazakhstan) Y Shvedova	3	7^{7}	3
(Japan) N Hibino	6	6^{5}	6
(Hungary) T Babos	3	7	6
(United States) M Brengle	6	5	0
(Bulgaria) T Pironkova	6	5	3
16	(Italy) S Errani	1	7	6
10	(Czech Republic) Ka Plíšková	1	1
(Russia) M Gasparyan	6	6
(Russia) E Makarova	3	2
(Germany) A Petkovic	6	6
(United States) C Vandeweghe	7	6
Q	(Belgium) K Flipkens	5	2

Second round
4	(Spain) G Muguruza	6	6
(Japan) N Hibino	2	0
(Hungary) T Babos	6	6
16	(Italy) S Errani	4	1
(Russia) M Gasparyan	3	3
(Germany) A Petkovic	6	6
(United States) C Vandeweghe	6	6
6	(Switzerland) B Bencic	4	2

Third round
4	(Spain) G Muguruza	6	7
(Hungary) T Babos	2	5
(Germany) A Petkovic	6	6
(United States) C Vandeweghe	3	4

Quarterfinals
4	(Spain) G Muguruza	1	7	2
(Germany) A Petkovic	6	5	6

=== Bottom half ===
==== Section 3 ====
First round
(Czech Republic) L Hradecká	4	7^{7}	2
WC	(Turkey) Ç Büyükakçay	6	6^{5}	6
(Russia) D Kasatkina	6	2	6
Q	(China) Q Wang	1	6	3
(Ukraine) L Tsurenko	2	1
9	(Italy) R Vinci	6	6
14	(Serbia) J Janković	6	6^{5}	6
Q	(Slovakia) J Čepelová	4	7^{7}	0
(Germany) S Lisicki	2	2
(Romania) M Niculescu	6	6
Q	(Ukraine) K Bondarenko	6	6
(Germany) A Beck	4	4

Second round
7	(Czech Republic) L Šafářová	6^{6}	5
WC	(Turkey) Ç Büyükakçay	7^{8}	7
(Russia) D Kasatkina	6	4	6^{3}
9	(Italy) R Vinci	2	6	7^{7}
14	(Serbia) J Janković	6	4	5
(Romania) M Niculescu	3	6	7
Q	(Ukraine) K Bondarenko	4	4
3	(Poland) A Radwańska	6	6

Third round
WC	(Turkey) Ç Büyükakçay	5	1
9	(Italy) R Vinci	7	6
(Romania) M Niculescu	5	1
3	(Poland) A Radwańska	7	6

Quarterfinals
9	(Italy) R Vinci	6	2	3
3	(Poland) A Radwańska	3	6	6

==== Section 4 ====
First round
Q	(Croatia) D Vekić	6	6
WC	(Oman) F Al-Nabhani	0	0
(Slovakia) AK Schmiedlová	2	4
(Kazakhstan) Y Putintseva	6	6
(United States) B Mattek-Sands	7^{9}	1	3
11	(Switzerland) T Bacsinszky	6^{7}	6	6
13	(Denmark) C Wozniacki	4	6	7
Q	(Croatia) A Konjuh	6	3	5
(Australia) D Gavrilova	6	6
(Japan) M Doi	1	1
(France) C Garcia	3	5
Q	(Russia) E Vesnina	6	7

Second round
8	(Spain) C Suárez Navarro	7^{7}	6
Q	(Croatia) D Vekić	6^{5}	4
(Kazakhstan) Y Putintseva	2	6^{0}
11	(Switzerland) T Bacsinszky	6	7^{7}
13	(Denmark) C Wozniacki	6	6
(Australia) D Gavrilova	3	3
Q	(Russia) E Vesnina	6^{1}	6	6
2	(Romania) S Halep	7^{7}	4	1

Third round
8	(Spain) C Suárez Navarro	6	6
11	(Switzerland) T Bacsinszky	2	2
13	(Denmark) C Wozniacki	5	7	3
Q	(Russia) E Vesnina	7	5	6

Quarterfinals
8	(Spain) C Suárez Navarro	6	7^{7}
Q	(Russia) E Vesnina	3	6^{3}

== Qualifying ==
=== Seeds ===
1. (Belgium) Kirsten Flipkens (qualified)
2. (Ukraine) Kateryna Bondarenko (qualified)
3. (Croatia) Ana Konjuh (qualified)
4. (China) Wang Qiang (qualified)
5. (Latvia) Anastasija Sevastova (qualified)
6. (United Kingdom) Naomi Broady (qualifying competition)
7. (Belarus) Aliaksandra Sasnovich (qualifying competition)
8. (Poland) Magda Linette (first round)
9. (Russia) Evgeniya Rodina (qualifying competition)
10. (Croatia) Donna Vekić (qualified)
11. (Czech Republic) Kateřina Siniaková (qualifying competition)
12. (Switzerland) Stefanie Vögele (qualifying competition)
13. (Czech Republic) Klára Koukalová (first round)
14. (Bulgaria) Sesil Karatantcheva (qualifying competition)
15. (Russia) Elena Vesnina (qualified)
16. (China) Duan Yingying (qualifying competition)

=== Qualifiers ===
1. (Belgium) Kirsten Flipkens
2. (Ukraine) Kateryna Bondarenko
3. (Croatia) Ana Konjuh
4. (China) Wang Qiang
5. (Latvia) Anastasija Sevastova
6. (Russia) Elena Vesnina
7. (Slovakia) Jana Čepelová
8. (Croatia) Donna Vekić

=== Draw ===
==== First qualifier ====
First round
1	(Belgium) Kirsten Flipkens	6^{4}	7^{7}	6
(China) Wang Yafan	7^{7}	6^{5}	4
(Czech Republic) Barbora Krejčíková	3	2
12	(Switzerland) Stefanie Vögele	6	6

Qualifying competition
1	(Belgium) Kirsten Flipkens	7^{7}	2	6
12	(Switzerland) Stefanie Vögele	6^{3}	6	3

==== Second qualifier ====
First round
2	(Ukraine) Kateryna Bondarenko	7^{7}	3	6
PR	(Spain) María José Martínez Sánchez	6^{0}	6	3
(Russia) Marina Melnikova	3	4
9	(Russia) Evgeniya Rodina	6	6

Qualifying competition
2	(Ukraine) Kateryna Bondarenko	6	7
9	(Russia) Evgeniya Rodina	2	5

==== Third qualifier ====
First round
3	(Croatia) Ana Konjuh	6	6
(Ukraine) Olga Savchuk	2	3
PR	(Russia) Vera Dushevina	3	6	0
11	(Czech Republic) Kateřina Siniaková	6	4	6

Qualifying competition
3	(Croatia) Ana Konjuh	3	7	6
11	(Czech Republic) Kateřina Siniaková	6	5	4

==== Fourth qualifier ====
First round
4	(China) Wang Qiang	6	6
WC	(Spain) Laura Pous Tió	3	2
(China) Xu Yifan	1	1
16	(China) Duan Yingying	6	6

Qualifying competition
4	(China) Wang Qiang	3	6	6
16	(China) Duan Yingying	6	0	4

==== Fifth qualifier ====
First round
5	(Latvia) Anastasija Sevastova	6	6
(Slovakia) Daniela Hantuchová	4	2
WC	(Qatar) Olla Mourad	0	0
14	(Bulgaria) Sesil Karatantcheva	6	6

Qualifying competition
5	(Latvia) Anastasija Sevastova	7^{7}	5	7
14	(Bulgaria) Sesil Karatantcheva	6^{3}	7	5

==== Sixth qualifier ====
First round
6	(United Kingdom) Naomi Broady	6	7
(Ukraine) Maryna Zanevska	3	5
(Tunisia) Ons Jabeur	4	1
15	(Russia) Elena Vesnina	6	6

Qualifying competition
6	(United Kingdom) Naomi Broady	5	2
15	(Russia) Elena Vesnina	7	6

==== Seventh qualifier ====
First round
7	(Belarus) Aliaksandra Sasnovich	1	6	6
(Slovenia) Tadeja Majerič	6	4	3
(Slovakia) Jana Čepelová	6	6
13	(Czech Republic) Klára Koukalová	3	0

Qualifying competition
7	(Belarus) Aliaksandra Sasnovich	4	3
(Slovakia) Jana Čepelová	6	6

==== Eighth qualifier ====
First round
8	(Poland) Magda Linette	6^{2}	6	4
(Czech Republic) Andrea Hlaváčková	7^{7}	3	6
(China) Zhang Kailin	5	6	5
10	(Croatia) Donna Vekić	7	4	7

Qualifying competition
(Czech Republic) Andrea Hlaváčková	1	6	4
10	(Croatia) Donna Vekić	6	2	6
