= Georgia Billie Jean King Cup team =

Georgian women's tennis team

Georgia
- Captain: Margalita Chakhnashvili-Ranzinger
- ITF ranking: 34 (16 November 2015)
- Colors: red & white
- First year: 1994
- Years played: 22
- Ties played (W–L): 81 (41–40)
- Best finish: Zonal Group I RR
- Most total wins: Margalita Chakhnashvili-Ranzinger (30–27)
- Most singles wins: Margalita Chakhnashvili-Ranzinger (21–15)
- Most doubles wins: Oksana Kalashnikova (25-9)
- Best doubles team: Oksana Kalashnikova / Sofia Shapatava (7–2)
- Most ties played: Margalita Chakhnashvili-Ranzinger (39)
- Most years played: Margalita Chakhnashvili-Ranzinger (11)

The Georgia Billie Jean King Cup team represents Georgia in the Billie Jean King Cup tennis competition and are governed by the Georgian Tennis Federation. They competed in the Europe/Africa Zone of Group II in 2007, but were promoted to Group I for 2008.

== History ==
Georgia competed in its first Fed Cup in 1994. Their best result was reaching Group I in 1999 and 2003.

== Players ==
Name	Years	First	Ties	Win/Loss		
Name	Years	First	Ties	Singles	Doubles	Total
Victoria Bakhtadze	2	1994	4	0–2	2–2	2–4
Mariam Bolkvadze	4	2015	10	4–5	2–0	6–5
Salome Chachkhunashvili	1	2005	2	0–0	1–1	1–1
Margalita Chakhnashvili	11	1998	39	21–15	9–12	30–27
Mariam Dalakishvili	1	2020	1	0–0	1–0	1–0
Salome Devidze	4	2000	16	9–6	9–5	18–11
Nino Esebua	2	2000	4	1–0	4–0	5–0
Ekaterine Gorgodze	11	2007	33	12–14	6–6	18–20
Ia Jikia	1	2006	3	1–2	0–3	1–5
Irina Kakoulia	2	1997	4	0–0	1–3	1–3
Oksana Kalashnikova	10	2007	33	3–8	16–6	19–14
Zoziya Kardava	1	2020	2	0–0	1–1	1–1
Tinatin Kavlashvili	3	2003	12	5–2	3–7	8–9
Sofia Kvatsabaia	5	2007	12	1–4	3–5	4–9
Nino Louarsabishvili	6	1994	20	9–11	8–12	17–23
Sofia Managadze	2	1996	6	1–5	0–4	1–9
Sofia Melikishvili	1	2004	4	3–1	1–0	4–1
Leila Meskhi	1	1994	4	4–0	1–1	5–1
Tatia Mikadze	3	2005	11	2–3	5–4	7–7
Manana Shapakidze	1	2009	2	0–0	1–1	1–1
Sofia Shapatava	10	2009	35	12–16	17–9	29–25
Anna Tatishvili	3	2009	11	9–2	1–1	10–3
Nana Urotadze	2	2002	3	0–2	0–1	0–3

== See also ==
- Billie Jean King Cup
- Georgia Davis Cup team
