= Kaja Juvan =

Slovenian tennis player (born 2000)

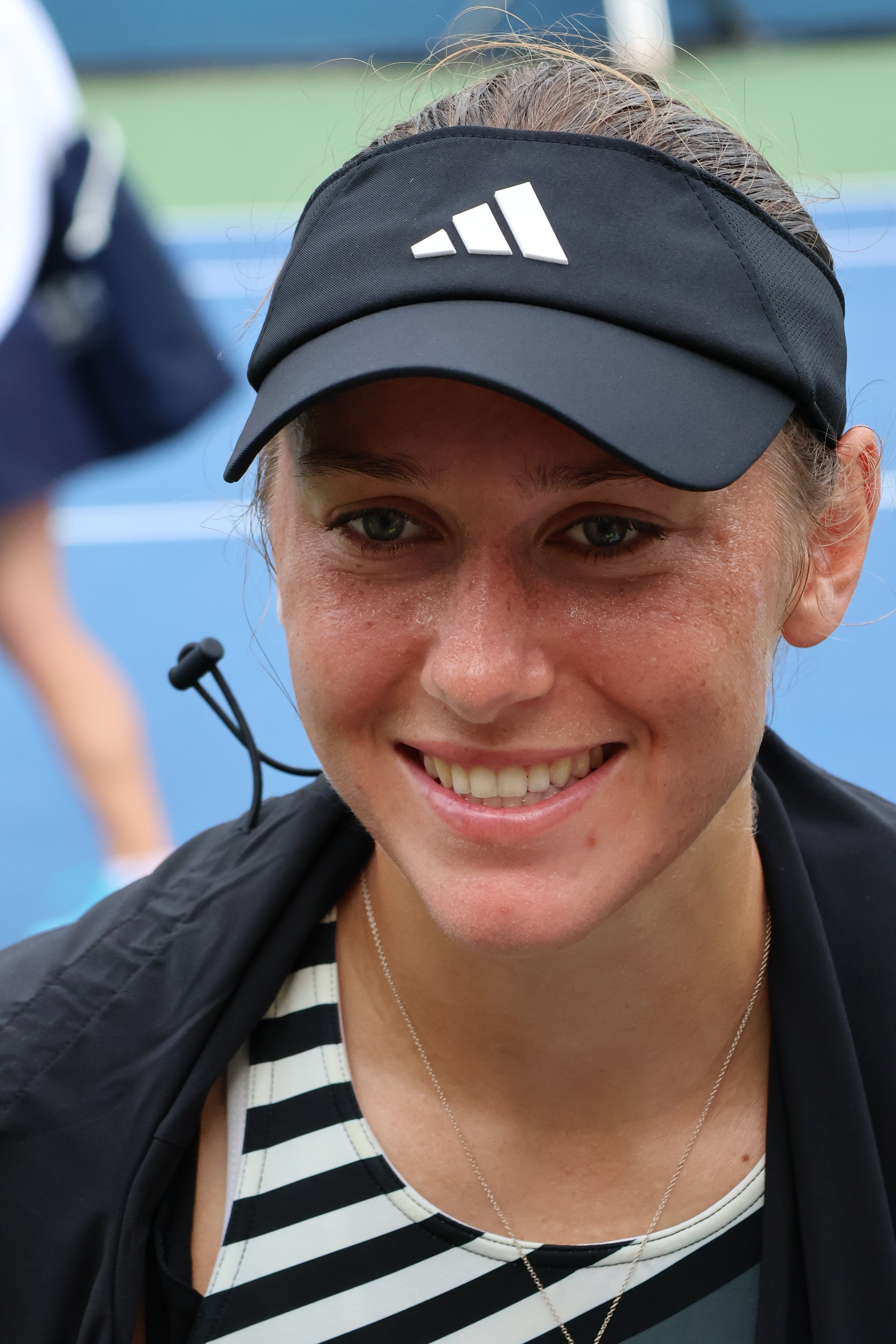
- Juvan at the 2023 US Open
- Country (sports): Slovenia
- Born: 25 November 2000 (age 25) Ljubljana, Slovenia
- Height: 1.70 m (5 ft 7 in)
- Turned pro: 2016
- Plays: Right-handed (two-handed backhand)
- Coach: Nik Razboršek
- Prize money: US$ 2,699,574

Singles
- Career record: 260–139
- Career titles: 2 WTA Challenger
- Highest ranking: No. 58 (6 June 2022)
- Current ranking: No. 247 (28 September 2026)

Grand Slam singles results
- Australian Open: 3R (2021)
- French Open: 2R (2020, 2022)
- Wimbledon: 3R (2021, 2022)
- US Open: 3R (2023)

Doubles
- Career record: 21–25
- Career titles: 1
- Highest ranking: No. 97 (18 July 2022)
- Current ranking: No. 873 (28 September 2026)

Grand Slam doubles results
- Australian Open: 2R (2022)
- French Open: 2R (2022)
- Wimbledon: 1R (2021, 2022)

Team competitions
- Fed Cup: 24–11
Medal record
Girls' tennis
Representing Slovenia
Youth Olympic Games
Gold medal – first place	2018 Buenos Aires	Girls' singles
Representing a Mixed-NOCs team
Youth Olympic Games
Gold medal – first place	2018 Buenos Aires	Girls' doubles
- Last updated on: 30 September 2026.

Kaja Juvan (born 25 November 2000) is a Slovenian professional tennis player. She has career-high rankings of world No. 58 in singles and No. 97 in doubles. Juvan won her maiden WTA Tour doubles title at the 2021 Romanian Open in Cluj-Napoca, partnering with Natela Dzalamidze.

== Juniors ==
On the junior tour, she achieved a career-high combined ranking of 5, in January 2017. She reached the semifinals of both the 2016 Wimbledon Championships and the 2016 US Open girls' doubles events. She was also a winner of the Orange Bowl in 2016.

Juvan and Iga Świątek of Poland won gold in doubles at the 2018 Summer Youth Olympics in Buenos Aires.

== Professional ==
=== 2019–2020: Major debut ===
Juvan made her Grand Slam tournament debut as a lucky loser at the 2019 French Open where she lost in the first round to Sorana Cîrstea.

After winning her qualifier bracket, she defeated Kristýna Plíšková to reach the second round at Wimbledon in July 2019, where she lost in three sets to 11th seed Serena Williams.

=== 2021: Two major 3rd rounds, first WTA Tour doubles title ===
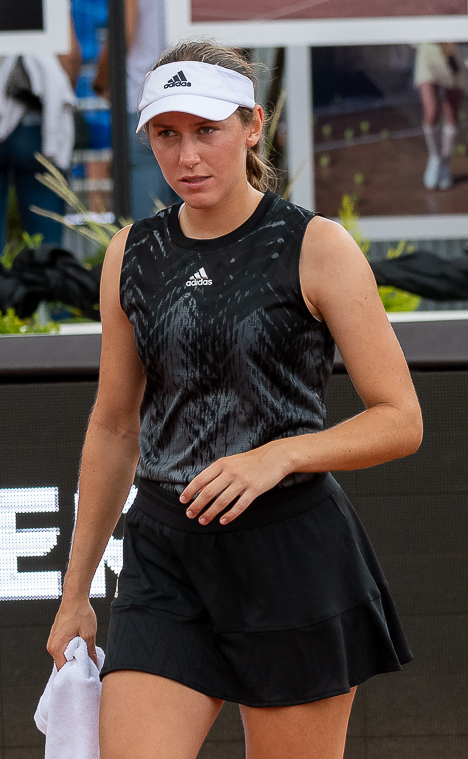
2021 Winners Open.

Juvan reached the third round of a Grand Slam championship at the Australian Open as a qualifier for the first time in her career, defeating 13th seed Johanna Konta in the first round by retirement, and Mayar Sherif in the second round She lost to 22nd seed Jennifer Brady. As a result, she entered the top 100 at a career high of world No. 91, on 22 February 2021.

In June, she also reached the third round at Wimbledon where she defeated ninth seed Belinda Bencic and qualifier Clara Burel, before losing to 20th seed Coco Gauff.

Partnering Natela Dzalamidze, Juvan won her first WTA Tour doubles title at the Linz Open, defeating Katarzyna Piter and Mayar Sherif in the final.

=== 2022: Second Wimbledon 3rd round ===
At Wimbledon, she defeated 23rd seed Beatriz Haddad Maia and Dalma Gálfi to make it through to the third round, where her run was ended by Heather Watson.

=== 2023: Break and return to competition ===
On 5 April 2023, Juvan announced that she was taking a break from her tennis career for personal reasons. She took two months off the tour following the death of her father Robert due to cancer.

She qualified for her third consecutive main draw at Wimbledon. Juvan overcame Margarita Betova in the first round, before losing to 22nd seed Anastasia Potapova.

Ranked No. 145, she qualified at the US Open, saving five match points in the last qualifying round, and reached the third round of the main draw, where she lost to longtime friend Iga Świątek. As a result, she moved close to 40 positions up in the rankings.

=== 2024–2025: Second hiatus and comeback ===
Juvan defeated 23rd seed Anastasia Potapova in the first round of the 2024 Australian Open, before losing her next match to qualifier Anastasia Zakharova.

Having been out of action for 12 months, Juvan qualified for the 2025 Texas Open, but lost in the first round to Ena Shibahara, in three sets. In May, she finished runner-up at the WTA 125 Open de Saint-Malo, losing in the final to second seed Naomi Osaka. In December 2025, Juvan revealed that the cause of her second hiatus was being diagnosed with functional neurological symptom disorder, which led to her needing to rethink her approach to tennis.

== Performance timelines ==
Key
W	F	SF	QF	#R	RR	Q#	P#	DNQ	A	Z#	PO	G	S	B	NMS	NTI	P	NH

(W) winner; (F) finalist; (SF) semifinalist; (QF) quarterfinalist; (#R) rounds 4, 3, 2, 1; (RR) round-robin stage; (Q#) qualification round; (P#) preliminary round; (DNQ) did not qualify; (A) absent; (Z#) Davis/Fed Cup Zonal Group (with number indication) or (PO) play-off; (G) gold, (S) silver or (B) bronze Olympic/Paralympic medal; (NMS) not a Masters tournament; (NTI) not a Tier I tournament; (P) postponed; (NH) not held; (SR) strike rate (events won / competed); (W–L) win–loss record.
To avoid confusion and double counting, these charts are updated at the conclusion of a tournament or when the player's participation has ended.

Only main-draw results in WTA Tour, Grand Slam tournaments, Billie Jean King Cup, United Cup, Hopman Cup and Olympic Games are included in win–loss records.

=== Singles ===
Current through the 2026 French Open.

Tournament	2017	2018	2019	2020	2021	2022	2023	2024	2025	2026	SR	W–L	Win %
Grand Slam tournaments
Australian Open	A	A	Q2	1R	3R	1R	2R	2R	A	1R	0 / 6	4–6	40%
French Open	A	A	1R	2R	1R	2R	Q2	A	Q3	Q2	0 / 4	2–4	33%
Wimbledon	A	A	2R	NH	3R	3R	2R	A	1R	A	0 / 5	6–5	55%
US Open	A	A	A	2R	2R	1R	3R	A	Q1	A	0 / 4	4–4	50%
Win–loss	0–0	0–0	1–2	2–3	5–4	3–4	4–3	1–1	0–1	0–1	0 / 19	16–19	46%
National representation
Billie Jean King Cup (Note: Formerly known as Fed Cup until 2020.)	Z2	Z1	Z1	Z1 (Note: Edition is split into the two years due to COVID-19.)		PO	SF	A	Z1		0 / 0	19–10	65%
WTA 1000
Dubai / Qatar Open (Note: The first Premier 5 event of the year has switched back and forth between the Dubai Tennis Championships and the Qatar Ladies Open since 2009. Dubai was classified as a Premier 5 event from 2009 to 2011 before being succeeded by Doha for the 2012–2014 period. In 2015, Dubai regained its Premier 5 status while Doha was demoted to Premier status. The Premier 5 tournaments were reclassified as WTA 1000 tournaments in 2021.)	A	A	A	A	A	2R	A	A	A	A	0 / 1	1–1	50%
Indian Wells Open	A	A	A	NH	A	2R	Q2	A	Q2	A	0 / 1	1–1	50%
Miami Open	A	A	A	NH	A	Q1	Q2	A	A	Q1	0 / 0	0–0	–
Madrid Open	A	A	A	NH	Q1	Q2	A	A	A	A	0 / 0	0–0	–
Italian Open	A	A	A	1R	A	1R	A	A	A	A	0 / 2	0–2	0%
Canadian Open	A	A	A	NH	A	A	A	A	A	A	0 / 0	0–0	–
Cincinnati Open	A	A	A	A	A	Q1	A	A	Q1	A	0 / 0	0–0	–
Guadalajara Open	NH					A	A	A	A		0 / 0	0–0	–
Wuhan Open	A	A	A	NH				A	A		0 / 0	0–0	–
China Open	A	A	A	NH			A	A	A		0 / 0	0–0	–
Win–loss	0–0	0–0	0–0	0–1	0–0	2–3	0–0	0–0	0–0		0 / 4	2–4	33%
Career statistics
	2017	2018	2019	2020	2021	2022	2023	2024	2025	2026	SR	W–L	Win %
Tournaments	0 (Note: During the season, she did not play in the main draw of any tour-level tournaments. However, she played in the Billie Jean King Cup, which is not counted as a played tournament but matches counted.)	0	4	7	14	14	8	1	2		Career total: 50		
Titles	0	0	0	0	0	0	0	0	0		Career total: 0		
Finals	0	0	0	0	0	1	0	0	0		Career total: 1		
Hard win–loss	0–1	1–1	1–3	4–3	10–9	6–8	4–5	1–1	0–1		0 / 28	27–32	46%
Clay win–loss	0–0	0–0	1–2	2–4	1–3	11–3	3–3	0–0	0–0		0 / 14	18–15	55%
Grass win–loss	0–0	0–0	1–2	NH	2–1	2–3	1–1	0–0	0–1		0 / 8	6–8	43%
Overall win–loss	0–1	1–1	3–7	6–7	13–13	19–14	8–9	1–1	0–2		0 / 50	51–55	48%
Win (%)	0%	0%	30%	46%	50%	58%	47%	50%	0%		Career total: 48%		
Year-end ranking (Note: 2016: WTA ranking–717.)	555	174	133	104	98	88	104	599	98		$2,360,701		

== WTA Tour finals ==
=== Singles: 1 (runner-up) ===
Legend WTA 250 (0–1)	Finals by surface Clay (0–1)

Result	W–L	Date	Tournament	Tier	Surface	Opponent	Score
Loss	0–1	May 2022	Internationaux de Strasbourg, France	WTA 250	Clay	(Germany) Angelique Kerber	6–7^{(5–7)}, 7–6^{(7–0)}, 6–7^{(5–7)}

=== Doubles: 1 (title) ===
Legend WTA 250 (1–0)	Finals by surface Clay (1–0)

Result	W–L	Date	Tournament	Tier	Surface	Partner	Opponents	Score
Win	1–0	Aug 2021	Cluj-Napoca Open, Romania	WTA 250	Clay	(Russia) Natela Dzalamidze	(Poland) Katarzyna Piter (Egypt) Mayar Sherif	6–3, 6–4

== WTA 125 finals ==
=== Singles: 3 (2 titles, 1 runner-up) ===
Result	W–L	Date	Tournament	Surface	Opponent	Score
Loss	0–1	May 2025	Open de Saint-Malo, France	Clay	(Japan) Naomi Osaka	1–6, 5–7
Win	1–1	Sep 2025	Ljubljana Open, Slovenia	Clay	(Switzerland) Simona Waltert	6–4, 6–4
Win	2–1	Oct 2025	Samsun Open, Turkey	Hard	(Czech Republic) Nikola Bartůňková	7–6^{(10–8)}, 6–3

== ITF Circuit finals ==
=== Singles: 13 (8 titles, 5 runner-ups) ===
Legend W60/75 tournaments (1–0) W25 tournaments (5–3) W10/15 tournaments (2–2)	Finals by surface Hard (0–1) Clay (8–4)

Result	W–L	Date	Tournament	Tier	Surface	Opponent	Score
Loss	0–1	Jun 2016	ITF Velenje, Slovenia	10,000	Clay	(Czech Republic) Gabriela Pantůčková	6–4, 2–6, 0–6
Win	1–1	Oct 2016	ITF Bol, Croatia	10,000	Clay	(Croatia) Tena Lukas	6–3, 6–1
Loss	1–2	Mar 2017	ITF Hammamet, Tunisia	15,000	Clay	(Italy) Camilla Scala	6–2, 5–7, 2–6
Win	2–2	Jun 2017	ITF Maribor, Slovenia	15,000	Clay	(Slovenia) Nina Potočnik	6–4, 6–2
Win	3–2	Apr 2018	ITF Balatonboglár, Hungary	25,000	Clay	(Romania) Raluca Șerban	6–4, 6–1
Loss	3–3	May 2018	ITF Andijan, Uzbekistan	25,000	Hard	(Uzbekistan) Sabina Sharipova	4–6, 2–6
Win	4–3	Jun 2018	ITF Ystad, Sweden	25,000	Clay	(Romania) Andreea Roșca	2–6, 7–5, 6–1
Loss	4–4	Jul 2018	ITF Turin, Italy	25,000	Clay	(Romania) Andreea Roșca	1–6, 1–6
Win	5–4	Sep 2018	ITF Bagnatica, Italy	25,000	Clay	(Italy) Jasmine Paolini	6–7^{(8)}, 6–1, 7–5
Win	6–4	Oct 2018	ITF Santa Margherita di Pula, Italy	25,000	Clay	(Russia) Polina Leykina	3–6, 6–1, 6–2
Loss	6–5	Mar 2019	ITF Santa Margherita di Pula	W25	Clay	(Switzerland) Jil Teichmann	6–7^{(3)}, 0–6
Win	7–5	Apr 2019	ITF Santa Margherita di Pula	W25	Clay	(Romania) Alexandra Cadanțu	6–1, 3–0 ret.
Win	8–5	May 2025	Internazionali di Brescia, Italy	W75	Clay	(Austria) Julia Grabher	7–6^{(1)}, 7–5

=== Doubles: 2 (1 title, 1 runner-up) ===
Legend W100 tournaments (0–1) W10 tournaments (1–0)	Finals by surface Hard (0–1) Clay (1–0)

Result	W–L	Date	Tournament	Tier	Surface	Partner	Opponents	Score
Win	1–0	Oct 2016	ITF Bol, Croatia	10k	Clay	(Croatia) Lea Bošković	(Croatia) Mariana Dražić (Croatia) Ani Mijačika	4–6, 7–5, [10–4]
Loss	1–1	Dec 2020	Dubai Tennis Challenge, UAE	W100	Hard	(Spain) Aliona Bolsova	(Georgia (country)) Ekaterine Gorgodze (India) Ankita Raina	4–6, 6–3, [6–10]

=== Junior Grand Slam tournament finals ===
==== Girls' doubles: 1 (title) ====
Result	Year	Tournament	Surface	Partner	Opponents	Score
Win	2017	Wimbledon	Grass	(Serbia) Olga Danilović	(United States) Caty McNally (United States) Whitney Osuigwe	6–4, 6–3

== Billie Jean King Cup participation ==
Legend
Europe/Africa Group (8–5)
Play-offs (2–0)
World Group Play-off / Finals qualifying round (1–1)
Finals (2–1)

=== Singles (13–7) ===
Edition	Stage	Date	Location	Surface	Against	Opponent	W/L	Score
2017	Z2 R/R	21 Apr 2017	Šiauliai (LIT)	Hard (i)	Norway	Astrid Wanja Brune Olsen	L	4–6, 7–6^{(5)}, 3–6
2018	Z1 R/R	7 Feb 2018	Tallinn (EST)	Hard (i)	Croatia	Lea Bošković	L	2–6, 6–4, 2–6
2018	Z1 R/R	9 Feb 2018	Tallinn (EST)	Hard (i)	Sweden	Jacqueline Cabaj Awad	W	6–1, 6–3
2019	Z1 R/R	6 Feb 2019	Bath (GBR)	Hard (i)	(United Kingdom) Great Britain	Katie Boulter	L	4–6, 2–6
2019	Z1 R/R	7 Feb 2019	Bath (GBR)	Hard (i)	Hungary	Dalma Gálfi	L	1–6, 4–6
2019	Z1 R/R	8 Feb 2019	Bath (GBR)	Hard (i)	Greece	Valentini Grammatikopoulou	L	6–7^{(2)}, 7–5, 3–6
2019	Z1 P/O	9 Feb 2019	Bath (GBR)	Hard (i)	(Georgia (country)) Georgia	Mariam Bolkvadze	W	6–1, 3–0 ret.
2020–21	Z1 R/R	5 Feb 2020	Esch-sur-Alzette (LUX)	Hard (i)	Turkey	Başak Eraydın	W	6–4, 7–5
2020–21	Z1 PO	8 Feb 2020	Esch-sur-Alzette (LUX)	Hard (i)	Serbia	Olga Danilović	W	6–2, 6–2
2022	Z1 R/R	11 Apr 2022	Antalya (TUR)	Clay	(Georgia (country)) Georgia	Zoziya Kardava	W	7–5, 6–1
2022	Z1 R/R	12 Apr 2022	Antalya (TUR)	Clay	Austria	Sinja Kraus	W	6–1, 6–4
2022	Z1 R/R	13 Apr 2022	Antalya (TUR)	Clay	Croatia	Ana Konjuh	W	6–2, 7–5
2022	Z1 R/R	14 Apr 2022	Antalya (TUR)	Clay	Bulgaria	Viktoriya Tomova	W	6–1, 6–2
2022	PO	11 Nov 2022	Velenje (SLO)	Clay	China	Wang Xinyu	W	6–3, 6–1
2022	PO	12 Nov 2022	Velenje (SLO)	Clay	China	Zheng Qinwen	W	2–6, 7–6^{(6)}, 6–3
2023	F QR	14 Apr 2023	Koper (SLO)	Clay	Romania	Ana Bogdan	L	6–3, 3–6, 4–6
2023	F QR	15 Apr 2023	Koper (SLO)	Clay	Romania	Jaqueline Cristian	W	6–2, 6–4
2023	F	7 Nov 2023	Seville (ESP)	Hard (i)	Australia	Ajla Tomljanovic	W	6–4, 6–1
2023	F	10 Nov 2023	Seville (ESP)	Hard (i)	Kazakhstan	Anna Danilina	W	6–1, 6–0
2023	F	11 Nov 2023	Seville (ESP)	Hard (i)	Italy	Martina Trevisan	L	6–7^{(6)}, 3–6

=== Doubles (5–3) ===
Legend
Europe/Africa Group (4–3)
World Group Play-off / Finals qualifying round (1–0)

Edition	Stage	Date	Location	Surface	Partner	Against	Opponents	W/L	Score
2017	Z2 R/R	20 Apr 2017	Šiauliai (LIT)	Hard (i)	Andreja Klepač	Sweden	Jacqueline C. Awad; Kajsa R. Persson	W	6–3, 7–5
2018	Z1 R/R	8 Feb 2018	Tallinn (EST)	Hard (i)	Tamara Zidanšek	Hungary	Dalma Gálfi; Fanny Stollár	L	4–6, 3–6
2018	Z1 R/R	9 Feb 2018	Tallinn (EST)	Hard (i)	Nika Radišič	Sweden	Mirjam Björklund; Jacqueline C. Awad	W	6–3, 6–7^{(5–7)}, 6–2
2019	Z1 R/R	6 Feb 2019	Bath (GBR)	Hard (i)	Dalila Jakupović	(United Kingdom) UK	Harriet Dart; Katie Swan	L	2–6, 2–6
2020–21	Z1 R/R	6 Feb 2020	Esch-sur-Alzette (LUX)	Hard (i)	Pia Lovrič	Poland	Maja Chwalińska; Alicja Rosolska	W	7–5, 6–0
2020–21	Z1 P/O	8 Feb 2020	Esch-sur-Alzette (LUX)	Hard (i)	Tamara Zidanšek	Serbia	Aleksandra Krunić; Nina Stojanović	L	4–6, 4–6
2022	Z1 R/R	12 Apr 2022	Antalya (TUR)	Clay	Tamara Zidanšek	Austria	Melanie Klaffner; Sinja Kraus	W	2–6, 6–4, 6–2
2023	F QR	16 Apr 2023	Koper (SLO)	Clay	Tamara Zidanšek	Romania	Irina Bara; Monica Niculescu	W	4–6, 6–2, 6–4

== Record against other players ==
=== Top 10 wins ===
Season	2022	Total
Wins	2	2

#	Player	Rank	Tournament	Surface	Rd	Score	KJR
2022
1.	(Belarus) Aryna Sabalenka	No. 2	Adelaide International, Australia	Hard	2R	7–6^{(8–6)}, 6–1	No. 100
2.	(Czech Republic) Karolína Plíšková	No. 8	Internationaux de Strasbourg, France	Clay	SF	6–2, 7–5	No. 81

== Notes ==
Sporting positions
Preceded by (Canada) Bianca Andreescu	Orange Bowl Girls' Singles Champion; Category: 18 and under 2016	Succeeded by (United States) Whitney Osuigwe
