= 2020 Billie Jean King Cup Europe/Africa Zone Group I – play-offs =

Subsection of tennis competition

The play-offs of the 2020–21 Billie Jean King Cup Europe/Africa Zone Group I were the final stages of the Group I zonal competition involving teams from the Europe/Africa. Using the positions determined in their pools, the thirteen teams faced off to determine their placing in the 2020 Billie Jean King Cup Europe/Africa Zone Group I. The top four teams advanced to the 2020 Billie Jean King Cup play-offs, while the bottom two teams were relegated to Europe/Africa Zone Group II for 2022.

== Pool results ==
Placing	Pool A (Tallinn)	Pool B (Tallinn)	Pool A (Esch-sur-Alzette)	Pool B (Esch-sur-Alzette)
1	Ukraine	Italy	Serbia	Poland
2	Croatia	Estonia	Sweden	Slovenia
3	—	Austria	—	
4	Bulgaria	Greece	Luxembourg	Turkey

== Promotional play-offs ==
The first-placed and second-placed teams of each pool played against one another in a head-to-head round. The winners of each round advanced to the 2020 Billie Jean King Cup play-offs.

=== Ukraine vs. Estonia ===
Ukraine
2
Tallink Tennis Center, Tallinn, Estonia
8 February 2020
Hard (indoors)

Estonia
1

			1	2	3
1	(Ukraine) (Estonia)	Dayana Yastremska; Elena Malõgina	6; 3	6; 1
2	(Ukraine) (Estonia)	Elina Svitolina; Anett Kontaveit	3; 6	7^{7} 6^{5}	2; 6
3	(Ukraine) (Estonia)	Marta Kostyuk / Dayana Yastremska; Anett Kontaveit / Elena Malõgina	6; 2	6; 0

=== Croatia vs. Italy ===
Croatia
0
Tallink Tennis Center, Tallinn, Estonia
8 February 2020
Hard (indoors)

Italy
2

			1	2	3
1	(Croatia) (Italy)	Lea Bošković; Elisabetta Cocciaretto	3; 6	3; 6
2	(Croatia) (Italy)	Jana Fett; Camila Giorgi	6^{4} 7^{7}	4; 6
3	(Croatia) (Italy)	Jana Fett / Darija Jurak; Jasmine Paolini / Martina Trevisan				not played

=== Serbia vs. Slovenia ===
Serbia
2
Centre National de Tennis, Esch-sur-Alzette, Luxembourg
8 February 2020
Hard (indoors)

Slovenia
1

			1	2	3
1	(Serbia) (Slovenia)	Olga Danilović; Kaja Juvan	2; 6	2; 6
2	(Serbia) (Slovenia)	Nina Stojanović; Tamara Zidanšek	6; 4	7; 5
3	(Serbia) (Slovenia)	Aleksandra Krunić / Nina Stojanović; Kaja Juvan / Tamara Zidanšek	6; 4	6; 4

=== Poland vs. Sweden ===
Poland
2
Centre National de Tennis, Esch-sur-Alzette, Luxembourg
8 February 2020
Hard (indoors)

Sweden
0

			1	2	3
1	(Poland) (Sweden)	Iga Świątek; Mirjam Björklund	7; 5	4; 6	6; 3
2	(Poland) (Sweden)	Magda Linette; Johanna Larsson	7; 5	6; 4
3	(Poland) (Sweden)	Maja Chwalińska / Alicja Rosolska; Johanna Larsson / Cornelia Lister				not played

== Relegation play-offs ==
The last-placed teams of each pool played against one another in a head-to-head round. The losers of each tie were relegated to Europe/Africa Zone Group II in 2022.

=== Bulgaria vs. Greece ===
Bulgaria
2
Tallink Tennis Center, Tallinn, Estonia
8 February 2020
Hard (indoors)

Greece
0

			1	2	3
1	(Bulgaria) (Greece)	Isabella Shinikova; Valentini Grammatikopoulou	6; 3	6; 1
2	(Bulgaria) (Greece)	Viktoriya Tomova; Despina Papamichail	6; 2	6; 4
3	(Bulgaria) (Greece)	Isabella Shinikova / Viktoriya Tomova; Valentini Grammatikopoulou / Despina Papamichail				not played

=== Luxembourg vs. Turkey ===
Luxembourg
0
Centre National de Tennis, Esch-sur-Alzette, Luxembourg
8 February 2020
Hard (indoors)

Turkey
2

			1	2	3
1	(Luxembourg) (Turkey)	Tiffany Cornelius; Berfu Cengiz	2; 6	2; 6
2	(Luxembourg) (Turkey)	Eléonora Molinaro; Pemra Özgen	3; 6	4; 6
3	(Luxembourg) (Turkey)	Tiffany Cornelius / Eléonora Molinaro; Ayla Aksu / İpek Öz				not played

== Final placements ==
Placing	Teams			
Promoted/First	Ukraine	Italy	Serbia	Poland
Fifth	Estonia	Croatia	Slovenia	Sweden
Ninth	Austria			
Tenth	Bulgaria		Turkey	
Twelfth/Relegated	Greece		Luxembourg	

- Ukraine, Italy, Serbia and Poland were promoted to the 2020 Billie Jean King Cup play-offs.
- Greece and Luxembourg were relegated to Europe/Africa Zone Group II in 2021.
