= 2020 Billie Jean King Cup Europe/Africa Zone Group I – Pool B (Esch-sur-Alzette) =

Subsection of tennis competition

Pool B (Esch-sur-Alzette) of the 2020–21 Billie Jean King Cup Europe/Africa Zone Group I was one of four pools in the Europe/Africa zone of the 2020–21 Billie Jean King Cup. Three teams competed in a round robin competition, with the top teams and the bottom team proceeding to their respective sections of the play-offs: the top teams played for advancement to 2020 Billie Jean King Cup Play-offs.

== Standings ==
		POL	SLO	TUR	RR; W–L	Set; W–L	Game; W–L	Standings
4	Poland		2–1	3–0	5–1	10–2 (83%)	66–38 (63%)	1
13	Slovenia	1–2		2–1	3–3	7–6 (54%)	62–60 (51%)	2
8	Turkey	0–3	1–2		1–5	2–11 (15%)	43–73 (37%)	3

Standings are determined by: 1. number of wins; 2. number of matches; 3. in two-team ties, head-to-head records; 4. in three-team ties, (a) percentage of matches won (head-to-head records if two teams remain tied), then (b) percentage of sets won (head-to-head records if two teams remain tied), then (c) percentage of games won (head-to-head records if two teams remain tied), then (d) Fed Cup rankings.

== Round-robin ==
=== Turkey vs. Slovenia ===
Turkey
1
Centre National de Tennis, Esch-sur-Alzette, Luxembourg
5 February 2020
Hard (indoors)

Slovenia
2

			1	2	3
1	(Turkey) (Slovenia)	Başak Eraydın; Kaja Juvan	4; 6	5; 7
2	(Turkey) (Slovenia)	Pemra Özgen; Tamara Zidanšek	6; 3	5; 7	6; 2
3	(Turkey) (Slovenia)	Ayla Aksu / İpek Öz; Dalila Jakupović / Tamara Zidanšek	0; 6	4; 6

=== Poland vs. Slovenia ===
Poland
2
Centre National de Tennis, Esch-sur-Alzette, Luxembourg
6 February 2020
Hard (indoors)

Slovenia
1

			1	2	3
1	(Poland) (Slovenia)	Iga Świątek; Nika Radišić	6; 2	6; 1
2	(Poland) (Slovenia)	Magda Linette; Tamara Zidanšek	7; 5	6; 4
3	(Poland) (Slovenia)	Maja Chwalińska / Alicja Rosolska; Kaja Juvan / Pia Lovrič	5; 7	0; 6

=== Poland vs. Turkey ===
Poland
3
Centre National de Tennis, Esch-sur-Alzette, Luxembourg
7 February 2020
Hard (indoors)

Turkey
0

			1	2	3
1	(Poland) (Turkey)	Iga Świątek; Berfu Cengiz	6; 3	6; 0
2	(Poland) (Turkey)	Magda Linette; Pemra Özgen	6; 0	6; 3
3	(Poland) (Turkey)	Maja Chwalińska / Magdalena Fręch; Ayla Aksu / İpek Öz	6; 3	6; 4
