= 2022 Billie Jean King Cup qualifying round =

Subsection of tennis competition

The 2022 Billie Jean King Cup qualifying round was played on 15 and 16 April 2022. The nine winners of this round will qualify for the 2022 Billie Jean King Cup Finals.

== Teams ==
Eighteen teams played for nine spots in the Finals, in series decided on a home and away basis.

These eighteen teams were:

- 10 teams ranked 3rd-12th in the 2020–21 Billie Jean King Cup Finals,
- 7 winners of the 2020–21 Billie Jean King Cup Play-offs,
- 1 loser of the 2020–21 Billie Jean King Cup Play-offs, based on rankings

The 9 winning teams of the qualifying round will play at the Finals and the 9 losing teams will play at the play-offs in November 2022.

Following the suspension of the Russian Tennis Federation (RTF) and Belarus Tennis Federation (BTF) from ITF membership and from participation in ITF international team competitions on 1 March 2022, Australia will replace RTF (who had qualified automatically as 2021 champions) in the 2022 Finals. The Qualifier tie between Australia and Slovakia scheduled for 15-16 April will therefore not be played. Both Slovakia and Belgium receiving a bye to the 2022 Finals.

#: Nations ranking as of 8 November 2021.

Seeded teams

1. Australia (#1)
2. France (#2)
3. United States (#4)
4. Czech Republic (#5)
5. Germany (#7)
6. Canada (#9)
7. Spain (#10)
8. Romania (#11)

Unseeded teams:

- Slovakia (#12)
- Belgium (#13)
- Latvia (#14)
- Great Britain (#15)
- Kazakhstan (#16)
- Italy (#17)
- Poland (#19)
- Ukraine (#24)
- Netherlands (#46)

== Results summary ==
Home team	Score	Away team	Location	Venue	Surface	Ref.
Australia [1]	BYE	Slovakia	Both teams received bye because of ITF sanctions.			
Italy	3–1	France [2]	Alghero	Tennis Club Alghero	Hard	
United States [3]	3–2	Ukraine	Asheville	Harrah's Cherokee Center	Hard (i)	
Czech Republic [4]	3–2	Great Britain	Prague	I. Czech Lawn Tennis Club	Clay	
Belarus [5]	BYE	Belgium	Antalya (Turkey)	Club Megasaray		
Kazakhstan	3–1	Germany [6]	Nur-Sultan	Daulet National Tennis Centre	Clay (i)	
Canada [7]	4–0	Latvia	Vancouver	Pacific Coliseum	Hard (i)	
Netherlands	0–4	Spain [8]	's-Hertogenbosch	Maaspoort	Clay (i)	
Poland	4–0	Romania [9]	Radom	Radom Sports Center	Hard (i)	

== Details of results ==
=== Italy vs. France ===
Italy
3
Tennis Club Alghero, Alghero, Italy
15–16 April
Hard

France
1

			1	2	3
1	(Italy) (France)	Jasmine Paolini; Alizé Cornet	2; 6	6; 1	7^{7} 6^{2}
2	(Italy) (France)	Camila Giorgi; Océane Dodin	6; 1	6; 2
3	(Italy) (France)	Camila Giorgi; Harmony Tan	6; 2	6; 0
4	(Italy) (France)	Jasmine Paolini; Océane Dodin				not played
5	(Italy) (France)	Lucia Bronzetti / Martina Trevisan; Océane Dodin / Kristina Mladenovic	6^{4} 7^{7}	1; 6

Team nominations:
Italy: Camila Giorgi, Jasmine Paolini, Martina Trevisan, Lucia Bronzetti, Elisabetta Cocciaretto
France: Alizé Cornet, Harmony Tan, Océane Dodin, Kristina Mladenovic

=== United States vs. Ukraine ===
United States
3
Harrah's Cherokee Center, Asheville, United States
15–16 April
Hard (i)

Ukraine
2

			1	2	3
1	(United States) (Ukraine)	Alison Riske; Dayana Yastremska	7^{18} 6^{16}	7; 5
2	(United States) (Ukraine)	Jessica Pegula; Katarina Zavatska	6; 2	6; 1
3	(United States) (Ukraine)	Jessica Pegula; Dayana Yastremska	3; 6	4; 6
4	(United States) (Ukraine)	Shelby Rogers; Katarina Zavatska	3; 6	4; 6
5	(United States) (Ukraine)	Asia Muhammad / Jessica Pegula; Lyudmyla Kichenok / Dayana Yastremska	7^{7} 6^{5}	6; 3

Team nominations:
United States: Jessica Pegula, Shelby Rogers, Alison Riske, Asia Muhammad, Desirae Krawczyk
Ukraine: Dayana Yastremska, Katarina Zavatska, Lyudmyla Kichenok, Nadiia Kichenok

=== Czech Republic vs. Great Britain ===
Czech Republic
3
I. Czech Lawn Tennis Club, Prague, Czech Republic
15–16 April
Clay

Great Britain
2

			1	2	3
1	(Czech Republic) (United Kingdom)	Markéta Vondroušová; Harriet Dart	6; 1	6; 0
2	(Czech Republic) (United Kingdom)	Tereza Martincová; Emma Raducanu	5; 7	5; 7
3	(Czech Republic) (United Kingdom)	Markéta Vondroušová; Emma Raducanu	6; 1	6; 1
4	(Czech Republic) (United Kingdom)	Linda Fruhvirtová; Harriet Dart	0; 6	7; 5	2; 6
5	(Czech Republic) (United Kingdom)	Karolína Muchová / Markéta Vondroušová; Harriet Dart / Katie Swan	6; 1	7; 5

Team nominations:
Czech Republic: Markéta Vondroušová, Tereza Martincová, Karolína Muchová, Marie Bouzková, Linda Fruhvirtová
Great Britain: Emma Raducanu, Harriet Dart, Katie Swan, Sonay Kartal

=== Kazakhstan vs. Germany ===
Kazakhstan
3
Daulet National Tennis Centre, Nur-Sultan, Kazakhstan
15–16 April
Clay (i)

Germany
1

			1	2	3
1	(Kazakhstan) (Germany)	Yulia Putintseva; Angelique Kerber	3; 6	6; 3	6; 2
2	(Kazakhstan) (Germany)	Elena Rybakina; Laura Siegemund	6; 0	6; 1
3	(Kazakhstan) (Germany)	Elena Rybakina; Angelique Kerber	4; 6	6; 3	7; 5
4	(Kazakhstan) (Germany)	Yulia Putintseva; Laura Siegemund				not played
5	(Kazakhstan) (Germany)	Anna Danilina / Zhibek Kulambayeva; Anna-Lena Friedsam / Jule Niemeier	2; 6	6; 3	6; 10

Team nominations:
Kazakhstan: Elena Rybakina, Yulia Putintseva, Zarina Diyas, Anna Danilina, Zhibek Kulambayeva
Germany: Angelique Kerber, Jule Niemeier, Anna-Lena Friedsam, Laura Siegemund

=== Canada vs. Latvia ===
Canada
4
Pacific Coliseum, Vancouver, Canada
15–16 April
Hard (i)

Latvia
0

			1	2	3
1	(Canada) (Latvia)	Leylah Fernandez; Darja Semenistaja	6; 1	6; 2
2	(Canada) (Latvia)	Rebecca Marino; Daniela Vismane	6; 3	6^{4} 7^{7}	6; 3
3	(Canada) (Latvia)	Leylah Fernandez; Daniela Vismane	6; 2	6; 1
4	(Canada) (Latvia)	Rebecca Marino; Darja Semenistaja				not played
5	(Canada) (Latvia)	Gabriela Dabrowski / Carol Zhao; Darja Semenistaja / Daniela Vismane	6; 1	6; 3

Team nominations:
Canada: Leylah Fernandez, Rebecca Marino, Françoise Abanda, Gabriela Dabrowski, Carol Zhao
Latvia: Daniela Vismane, Diāna Marcinkēviča, Darja Semenistaja, Līga Dekmeijere

=== Netherlands vs. Spain ===
Netherlands
0
Maaspoort, 's-Hertogenbosch, Netherlands
15–16 April
Clay (i)

Spain
4

			1	2	3
1	(Netherlands) (Spain)	Arantxa Rus; Nuria Párrizas Díaz	2; 6	6^{4} 7^{7}
2	(Netherlands) (Spain)	Lesley Pattinama Kerkhove; Sara Sorribes Tormo	4; 6	3; 6
3	(Netherlands) (Spain)	Arantxa Rus; Sara Sorribes Tormo	0; 6	4; 6
4	(Netherlands) (Spain)	Lesley Pattinama Kerkhove; Nuria Párrizas Díaz				not played
5	(Netherlands) (Spain)	Arianne Hartono / Demi Schuurs; Aliona Bolsova / Rebeka Masarova	6; 4	6^{7} 7^{9}	7; 10

Team nominations:
Netherlands: Arantxa Rus, Lesley Pattinama Kerkhove, Arianne Hartono, Demi Schuurs
Spain: Sara Sorribes Tormo, Nuria Párrizas Díaz, Rebeka Masarova, Aliona Bolsova

=== Poland vs. Romania ===
Poland
4
Radom Sports Center, Radom, Poland
15–16 April
Hard (i)

Romania
0

			1	2	3
1	(Poland) (Romania)	Magda Linette; Irina-Camelia Begu	6; 1	4; 6	6; 2
2	(Poland) (Romania)	Iga Świątek; Mihaela Buzărnescu	6; 1	6; 0
3	(Poland) (Romania)	Iga Świątek; Andreea Prisăcariu	6; 0	6; 0
4	(Poland) (Romania)	Magda Linette; Mihaela Buzărnescu				not played
5	(Poland) (Romania)	Magdalena Fręch / Alicja Rosolska; Mihaela Buzărnescu / Andreea Mitu	5; 7	6; 3	10; 5

Team nominations:
Poland: Iga Świątek, Magda Linette, Magdalena Fręch, Maja Chwalińska, Alicja Rosolska
Romania: Irina-Camelia Begu, Mihaela Buzărnescu, Andreea Mitu, Andreea Prisăcariu
