= 2019 Fed Cup Europe/Africa Zone Group I – play-offs =

Subsection of tennis competition

The play-offs of the 2019 Fed Cup Europe/Africa Zone Group I were the final stages of the Group I zonal competition involving teams from Europe and Africa. Using the positions determined in their pools, the fourteen teams faced off to determine their placing in the 2019 Fed Cup Europe/Africa Zone Group I. The top two teams advanced to World Group II play-offs, and the bottom two teams were relegated to the Europe/Africa Zone Group II.

== Pool results ==
Placing	Pool A (Zielona Góra)	Pool B (Zielona Góra)	Pool A (Bath)	Pool B (Bath)
1	Russia	Sweden	Great Britain	Serbia
2	Poland	Ukraine	Hungary	Croatia
3	—N/a	Bulgaria	Greece	Turkey
4	Denmark	Estonia	Slovenia	Georgia

== Promotional play-offs ==
The first placed teams of each pool were drawn in head-to-head rounds. The winner of each round advanced to the World Group II play-offs.

=== Russia vs. Sweden ===
Russia
2
Hala Widowiskowo-Sportowa, Zielona Góra, Poland
9 February
Hard (indoor)

Sweden
0

			1	2	3
1	(Russia) (Sweden)	Natalia Vikhlyantseva; Johanna Larsson	7^{7} 6^{1}	6; 2
2	(Russia) (Sweden)	Anastasia Pavlyuchenkova; Rebecca Peterson	6; 3	6; 2
3	(Russia) (Sweden)	Margarita Gasparyan / Anastasia Potapova; Mirjam Björklund / Cornelia Lister				not played

=== Great Britain vs. Serbia ===
Great Britain
2
University of Bath, Bath, United Kingdom
9 February
Hard (indoor)

Serbia
0

			1	2	3
1	(United Kingdom) (Serbia)	Katie Boulter; Ivana Jorović	6; 4	6; 3
2	(United Kingdom) (Serbia)	Johanna Konta; Aleksandra Krunić	7^{7} 6^{1}	3; 6	6; 2
3	(United Kingdom) (Serbia)	Harriet Dart / Katie Swan; Olga Danilović / Aleksandra Krunić				not played

== 5th place play-off ==
The runner-up teams from pools A and B (in both venues) competed in order to establish which two teams would place joint fifth in the final standings and which two would place joint seventh.

=== Poland vs. Ukraine ===
Poland
2
Hala Widowiskowo-Sportowa, Zielona Góra, Poland
9 February
Hard (indoor)

Ukraine
1

			1	2	3
1	(Poland) (Ukraine)	Magdalena Fręch; Kateryna Kozlova	3; 6	7; 5	6; 2
2	(Poland) (Ukraine)	Iga Świątek; Dayana Yastremska	6^{2} 7^{7}	4; 6
3	(Poland) (Ukraine)	Alicja Rosolska / Iga Świątek; Marta Kostyuk / Kateryna Kozlova	6; 1	1; 6	7^{7} 6^{5}

=== Hungary vs. Croatia ===
Hungary
2
University of Bath, Bath, United Kingdom
9 February
Hard (indoor)

Croatia
0

			1	2	3
1	(Hungary) (Croatia)	Adrienn Nagy; Tena Lukas	6; 3	4; 6	6; 4
2	(Hungary) (Croatia)	Réka Luca Jani; Jana Fett	3; 6	5; 2		retired
3	(Hungary) (Croatia)	Réka Luca Jani / Adrienn Nagy; Jana Fett / Tena Lukas				not played

== 9th place play-off ==
The third placed teams from pools A and B in Bath competed in order to establish which team would place ninth in the final standings (alongside Bulgaria) and which team would place eleventh.

=== Greece vs. Turkey ===
Greece
1
University of Bath, Bath, United Kingdom
9 February
Hard (indoor)

Turkey
2

			1	2	3
1	(Greece) (Turkey)	Despina Papamichail; İpek Soylu	3; 6	6; 2	6; 2
2	(Greece) (Turkey)	Valentini Grammatikopoulou; Berfu Cengiz	3; 5			retired
3	(Greece) (Turkey)	Anna Arkadianou / Despina Papamichail; Berfu Cengiz / İpek Öz	6^{6} 7^{8}	4; 6

== Relegation play-offs ==
The teams placing last in each pool competed to keep their place in the Europe/Africa Zone Group I. The losers were relegated to the 2020 Europe/Africa Zone Group II.

=== Denmark vs. Estonia ===
Denmark
0
Hala Widowiskowo-Sportowa, Zielona Góra, Poland
9 February
Hard (indoor)

Estonia
2

			1	2	3
1	(Denmark) (Estonia)	Hannah Viller Møller; Valeria Gorlats	3; 6	6; 3	0; 6
2	(Denmark) (Estonia)	Karen Barritza; Anett Kontaveit	1; 6	4; 6
3	(Denmark) (Estonia)	Karen Barritza / Maria Jespersen; Anett Kontaveit / Saara Orav				not played

=== Slovenia vs. Georgia ===
Slovenia
2
University of Bath, Bath, United Kingdom
9 February
Hard (indoor)

Georgia
0

			1	2	3
1	(Slovenia) (Georgia (country))	Kaja Juvan; Mariam Bolkvadze	6; 1	3; 0		retired
2	(Slovenia) (Georgia (country))	Dalila Jakupović; Ekaterine Gorgodze	6; 4	6; 4
3	(Slovenia) (Georgia (country))	Nina Potočnik / Nika Radišič; Ekaterine Gorgodze / Oksana Kalashnikova				not played

=== Final placements ===
Placing	Teams	
Promoted/First	Russia	Great Britain
Third	Sweden	Serbia
Fifth	Poland	Hungary
Seventh	Ukraine	Croatia
Ninth	Bulgaria	Turkey
Eleventh	—N/a	Greece
Twelfth	Estonia	Slovenia
Relegated/Fourteenth	Denmark	Georgia

- Russia and Great Britain were promoted to 2019 Fed Cup World Group II play-offs
- Denmark and Georgia were relegated to Europe/Africa Zone Group II in 2020
