= 2020 Billie Jean King Cup Europe/Africa Zone Group I – Pool B (Tallinn) =

Subsection of tennis competition

Pool B (Tallinn) of the 2020–21 Billie Jean King Cup Europe/Africa Zone Group I was one of four pools in the Europe/Africa zone of the 2020–21 Billie Jean King Cup. Four teams competed in a round robin competition, with the top teams and the bottom team proceeding to their respective sections of the play-offs: the top teams played for advancement to 2020 Billie Jean King Cup Play-offs.

== Standings ==
		ITA	EST	AUT	GRE	RR; W–L	Set; W–L	Game; W–L	Standings
3	Italy		2–1	3–0	3–0	8–1	17–3 (85%)	115–54 (68%)	1
7	Estonia	1–2		2–1	1–2	4–5	11–12 (48%)	99–108 (48%)	2
9	Austria	0–3	1–2		2–1	3–6	7–14 (33%)	84–111 (43%)	3
12	Greece	0–3	2–1	1–2		3–6	8–14 (36%)	89–114 (44%)	4

Standings are determined by: 1. number of wins; 2. number of matches; 3. in two-team ties, head-to-head records; 4. in three-team ties, (a) percentage of matches won (head-to-head records if two teams remain tied), then (b) percentage of sets won (head-to-head records if two teams remain tied), then (c) percentage of games won (head-to-head records if two teams remain tied), then (d) Fed Cup rankings.

== Round-robin ==
=== Italy vs. Austria ===
Italy
3
Tallink Tennis Center, Tallinn, Estonia
5 February 2020
Hard (indoors)

Austria
0

			1	2	3
1	(Italy) (Austria)	Camila Giorgi; Mira Antonitsch	4; 6	6; 3	6; 0
2	(Italy) (Austria)	Jasmine Paolini; Julia Grabher	6; 3	6; 1
3	(Italy) (Austria)	Giulia Gatto-Monticone / Martina Trevisan; Melanie Klaffner / Sinja Kraus	6; 4	6; 4

=== Estonia vs. Greece ===
Estonia
1
Tallink Tennis Center, Tallinn, Estonia
5 February 2020
Hard (indoors)

Greece
2

			1	2	3
1	(Estonia) (Greece)	Elena Malõgina; Valentini Grammatikopoulou	4; 6	6; 4	6^{8} 7^{10}
2	(Estonia) (Greece)	Anett Kontaveit; Despina Papamichail	3; 6	6; 3	6; 0
3	(Estonia) (Greece)	Anett Kontaveit / Elena Malõgina; Valentini Grammatikopoulou / Despina Papamichail	3; 6	6; 4	2; 6

=== Italy vs. Estonia ===
Italy
2
Tallink Tennis Center, Tallinn, Estonia
6 February 2020
Hard (indoors)

Estonia
1

			1	2	3
1	(Italy) (Estonia)	Elisabetta Cocciaretto; Elena Malõgina	6; 1	6; 1
2	(Italy) (Estonia)	Camila Giorgi; Anett Kontaveit	3; 6	6; 4	6^{4} 7^{7}
3	(Italy) (Estonia)	Jasmine Paolini / Martina Trevisan; Valeria Gorlats / Katriin Saar	6; 3	6; 2

=== Austria vs. Greece ===
Austria
2
Tallink Tennis Center, Tallinn, Estonia
6 February 2020
Hard (indoors)

Greece
1

			1	2	3
1	(Austria) (Greece)	Sinja Kraus; Valentini Grammatikopoulou	4; 6	4; 6
2	(Austria) (Greece)	Julia Grabher; Despina Papamichail	1; 6	6; 4	7; 5
3	(Austria) (Greece)	Melanie Klaffner / Sinja Kraus; Valentini Grammatikopoulou / Despina Papamichail	7; 5	7^{7} 6^{2}

=== Italy vs. Greece ===
Italy
3
Tallink Tennis Center, Tallinn, Estonia
7 February 2020
Hard (indoors)

Greece
0

			1	2	3
1	(Italy) (Greece)	Elisabetta Cocciaretto; Dimitra Pavlou	6; 1	6; 2
2	(Italy) (Greece)	Jasmine Paolini; Michaela Laki	6; 1	6; 4
3	(Italy) (Greece)	Elisabetta Cocciaretto / Giulia Gatto-Monticone; Valentini Grammatikopoulou / Dimitra Pavlou	6; 1	6; 0

=== Estonia vs. Austria ===
Estonia
2
Tallink Tennis Center, Tallinn, Estonia
7 February 2020
Hard (indoors)

Austria
1

			1	2	3
1	(Estonia) (Austria)	Elena Malõgina; Melanie Klaffner	7^{7} 6^{5}	6; 2
2	(Estonia) (Austria)	Anett Kontaveit; Julia Grabher	6; 1	6; 2
3	(Estonia) (Austria)	Valeria Gorlats / Saara Orav; Melanie Klaffner / Sinja Kraus	2; 6	6; 4	0; 6
