= 2019 Fed Cup Europe/Africa Zone Group I – Pool A (Bath) =

Subsection of tennis competition

Pool A (Bath) of the 2019 Fed Cup Europe/Africa Zone Group I is one of four pools in the Europe/Africa zone of the 2019 Fed Cup. Four teams competed in a round robin competition, with the top team and the bottom team proceeding to their respective sections of the play-offs: the top team played for advancement to the World Group II Play-offs, while the bottom team faced potential relegation to Group II.

== Standings ==
		GBR	HUN	GRE	SLO	RR; W–L	Set; W–L	Game; W–L	Standings
2	Great Britain		2–0	3–0	3–0	3–0	16–4 (80%)	119–78 (60%)	1
8	Hungary	0–2		2–1	3–0	2–1	12–8 (60%)	106–90 (54%)	2
13	Greece	0–3	1–2		2–1	1–2	8–14 (36%)	84–114 (42%)	3
15	Slovenia	0–3	0–3	1–2		0–3	6–16 (27%)	89–116 (43%)	4

Method to determine standings:
1. If two Nations score an equal number of points, the head-to-head result between these Nations shall decide the winner.
2. If three or more Nations score an equal number of points the following procedure must be used:
  - The number of matches won shall decide the winner.
  - If matches won are equal, the percentage of sets won of sets played against all teams in the pool shall decide the winner.
  - If the percentage of sets won is equal, the percentage of games won of games played against all teams in the pool shall decide the winner.
When three or more Nations are tied head-to-head results are never used to determine the positions in the pool.

== Round-robin ==
=== Great Britain vs. Slovenia ===
Great Britain
3
University of Bath, Bath, United Kingdom
6 February
Hard (indoor)

Slovenia
0

			1	2	3
1	(United Kingdom) (Slovenia)	Katie Boulter; Kaja Juvan	6; 4	6; 2
2	(United Kingdom) (Slovenia)	Johanna Konta; Dalila Jakupović	7^{9} 6^{7}	6; 2
3	(United Kingdom) (Slovenia)	Harriet Dart / Katie Swan; Dalila Jakupović / Kaja Juvan	6; 2	6; 2

=== Hungary vs. Greece ===
Hungary
2
University of Bath, Bath, United Kingdom
6 February
Hard (indoor)

Greece
1

			1	2	3
1	(Hungary) (Greece)	Dalma Gálfi; Valentini Grammatikopoulou	6; 0	6; 3
2	(Hungary) (Greece)	Anna Bondár; Maria Sakkari	3; 6	2; 6
3	(Hungary) (Greece)	Dalma Gálfi / Réka Luca Jani; Despina Papamichail / Maria Sakkari	6; 3	6; 4

=== Great Britain vs. Greece ===
Great Britain
3
University of Bath, Bath, United Kingdom
7 February
Hard (indoor)

Greece
0

			1	2	3
1	(United Kingdom) (Greece)	Katie Boulter; Valentini Grammatikopoulou	6; 3	4; 6	6; 3
2	(United Kingdom) (Greece)	Johanna Konta; Maria Sakkari	4; 6	6; 2	6; 3
3	(United Kingdom) (Greece)	Harriet Dart / Katie Swan; Anna Arkadianou / Despina Papamichail	6; 1	6; 4

=== Hungary vs. Slovenia ===
Hungary
3
University of Bath, Bath, United Kingdom
7 February
Hard (indoor)

Slovenia
0

			1	2	3
1	(Hungary) (Slovenia)	Dalma Gálfi; Kaja Juvan	6; 1	6; 4
2	(Hungary) (Slovenia)	Anna Bondár; Dalila Jakupović	4; 6	6; 1	6; 4
3	(Hungary) (Slovenia)	Adrienn Nagy / Réka Luca Jani; Nina Potočnik / Nika Radišič	7^{7} 6^{3}	4; 6	6; 2

=== Great Britain vs. Hungary ===
Great Britain
2
University of Bath, Bath, United Kingdom
8 February
Hard (indoor)

Hungary
0

			1	2	3
1	(United Kingdom) (Hungary)	Katie Boulter; Dalma Gálfi	6; 4	6^{5} 7^{7}	7^{7} 6^{1}
2	(United Kingdom) (Hungary)	Johanna Konta; Anna Bondár	6; 2	6^{1} 7^{7}	7^{7} 6^{4}
3	(United Kingdom) (Hungary)	Harriet Dart / Katie Swan; Dalma Gálfi / Réka Luca Jani				not played

=== Greece vs. Slovenia ===
Greece
2
University of Bath, Bath, United Kingdom
8 February
Hard (indoor)

Slovenia
1

			1	2	3
1	(Greece) (Slovenia)	Valentini Grammatikopoulou; Kaja Juvan	7^{7} 6^{2}	5; 7	6; 3
2	(Greece) (Slovenia)	Maria Sakkari; Dalila Jakupović	4; 6	6; 4	6; 3
3	(Greece) (Slovenia)	Valentini Grammatikopoulou / Maria Sakkari; Nina Potočnik / Nika Radišič	0; 6	0; 6		w/o
