= 2022 Billie Jean King Cup finals =

Part of tennis tournament

- Date: 8–13 November 2022
- Edition: 59th
- Surface: Hard (Indoor)
- Location: Glasgow, United Kingdom
- Venue: Emirates Arena

Champions
- Switzerland
- Billie Jean King Cup

The Billie Jean King Cup finals is the highest level of the Billie Jean King Cup competition in 2022. The competition took place in Glasgow from 8 to 13 November 2022. The ties were contested in a best-of-three rubbers format and played on one day. There were two singles followed by a doubles. The finals featured 12 teams.

Switzerland defeated Australia in the final 2–0 to win its first Billie Jean King Cup title.

The Russian Tennis Federation were the reigning champions, but they were banned from participating in ITF international team competition in response to the Russian invasion of Ukraine.

== Participating teams ==
12 nations took part in the finals. The qualification was as follows:

- 1 finalist of the previous edition (just Switzerland, as reigning champion Russia was suspended)
- 1 highest-ranked losing semi-finalist of the previous edition (Australia)
- 1 host nation (Great Britain)
- 7 winners of the qualifying round in April 2022
- 1 team received a bye in the qualifying round (Slovakia)
- 1 team qualified with a walkover (Belgium)

Participating teams
Australia	Belgium	Canada	Czech Republic	Great Britain (H)	Italy
Kazakhstan	Poland	Slovakia	Spain	Switzerland	United States

== Team nominations ==
SR = Singles ranking, DR = Doubles ranking. Rankings are as of 7 November 2022.

Australia
Player	SR	DR
Ajla Tomljanović	33	136
Priscilla Hon	151	340
Storm Sanders	237	10
Ellen Perez	363	20
Samantha Stosur	539	113
Captain: Alicia Molik

Belgium
Player	SR	DR
Elise Mertens	29	5
Alison Van Uytvanck	54	183
Maryna Zanevska	81	177
Ysaline Bonaventure	96	299
Kirsten Flipkens	241	30
Captain: Johan Van Herck

Canada
Player	SR	DR
Leylah Fernandez	40	76
Bianca Andreescu	45	380
Rebecca Marino	64	357
Carol Zhao	163	564
Gabriela Dabrowski	1012	7
Captain: Sylvain Bruneau

Czech Republic
Player	SR	DR
Karolína Plíšková	32	329
Kateřina Siniaková	47	1
Markéta Vondroušová	99	119
Karolína Muchová	149	498
Captain: Petr Pála

Great Britain
Player	SR	DR
Harriet Dart	98	120
Katie Boulter	124	–
Heather Watson	133	115
Alicia Barnett	817	60
Olivia Nicholls	–	63
Captain: Anne Keothavong

Italy
Player	SR	DR
Martina Trevisan	28	244
Lucia Bronzetti	56	585
Jasmine Paolini	59	141
Elisabetta Cocciaretto	65	397
Captain: Tathiana Garbin

Kazakhstan
Player	SR	DR
Elena Rybakina	22	442
Yulia Putintseva	51	314
Zhibek Kulambayeva	438	204
Anna Danilina	517	11
Captain: Yaroslava Shvedova

Poland
Player	SR	DR
Magda Linette	49	45
Magdalena Fręch	116	525
Katarzyna Kawa	261	75
Martyna Kubka	608	313
Alicja Rosolska	–	34
Captain: Dawid Celt

Slovakia
Player	SR	DR
Anna Karolína Schmiedlová	100	1276
Viktória Kužmová	146	89
Rebecca Šramková	316	550
Renáta Jamrichová	881	–
Tereza Mihalíková	984	48
Captain: Matej Lipták

Spain
Player	SR	DR
Paula Badosa	13	190
Nuria Párrizas Díaz	72	335
Cristina Bucșa	107	151
Rebeka Masarova	132	189
Aliona Bolsova	193	58
Captain: Anabel Medina Garrigues

Switzerland
Player	SR	DR
Belinda Bencic	12	133
Jil Teichmann	35	106
Viktorija Golubic	77	90
Simona Waltert	120	399
Captain: Heinz Günthardt

United States
Player	SR	DR
Coco Gauff	7	4
Madison Keys	11	56
Danielle Collins	14	287
Caty McNally	94	21
Taylor Townsend	131	33
Captain: Kathy Rinaldi

== Format ==
The 12 teams were divided into four round robin groups of three teams each. The four group winners qualified for the semifinals.

Day	Round	Number of teams
8–11 November	Round robin	12 (4 groups of 3 teams)
12 November	Semifinals	4
13 November	Final	2

== Group stage ==
Qualified for the Knockout stage

=== Overview ===
T = Ties, M = Matches, S = Sets

Group	Winners				Runners-up				Third			
Group	Nation	T	M	S	Nation	T	M	S	Nation	T	M	S
A	Switzerland	2–0	5–1	10–4	Canada	1–1	4–2	9–4	Italy	0–2	0–6	1–12
B	Australia	2–0	5–1	11–3	Slovakia	1–1	3–3	6–8	Belgium	0–2	1–5	4–10
C	Great Britain	1–1	4–2	9–4	Spain	1–1	3–3	6–8	Kazakhstan	1–1	2–4	6–9
D	Czech Republic	2–0	4–2	8–4	United States	1–1	3–3	7–7	Poland	0–2	2–4	5–9

=== Group A ===
Pos.	Country	Ties	Matches	Sets	Sets %	Games	Games %
1	Switzerland	2–0	5–1	10–4	71%	73–60	55%
2	Canada	1–1	4–2	9–4	69%	67–41	62%
3	Italy	0–2	0–6	1–12	8%	41–80	34%

==== Switzerland vs. Italy ====
Switzerland
3
Emirates Arena, Glasgow, Scotland
9 November 2022
Hard (i)

Italy
0

			1	2	3
1	(Switzerland) (Italy)	Jil Teichmann; Elisabetta Cocciaretto	6; 3	4; 6	7^{7} 6^{5}
2	(Switzerland) (Italy)	Belinda Bencic; Jasmine Paolini	7; 5	6; 3
3	(Switzerland) (Italy)	Belinda Bencic / Jil Teichmann; Jasmine Paolini / Martina Trevisan	7^{7} 6^{5}	6; 1

==== Canada vs. Italy ====
Canada
3
Emirates Arena, Glasgow, Scotland
10 November 2022
Hard (i)

Italy
0

			1	2	3
1	(Canada) (Italy)	Bianca Andreescu; Elisabetta Cocciaretto	7^{7} 6^{3}	6; 3
2	(Canada) (Italy)	Leylah Fernandez; Martina Trevisan	6; 0	6; 0
3	(Canada) (Italy)	Gabriela Dabrowski / Leylah Fernandez; Lucia Bronzetti / Jasmine Paolini	6; 1	6; 1

==== Switzerland vs. Canada ====
Switzerland
2
Emirates Arena, Glasgow, Scotland
11 November 2022
Hard (i)

Canada
1

			1	2	3
1	(Switzerland) (Canada)	Viktorija Golubic; Bianca Andreescu	2; 6	6; 3	6; 4
2	(Switzerland) (Canada)	Belinda Bencic; Leylah Fernandez	6; 0	7; 5
3	(Switzerland) (Canada)	Jil Teichmann / Simona Waltert; Gabriela Dabrowski / Leylah Fernandez	2; 6	1; 6

=== Group B ===
Pos.	Country	Ties	Matches	Sets	Sets %	Games	Games %
1	Australia	2–0	5–1	11–3	79%	73–40	65%
2	Slovakia	1–1	3–3	6–8	42%	52–65	44%
3	Belgium	0–2	1–5	4–10	29%	53–73	42%

==== Australia vs. Slovakia ====
Australia
2
Emirates Arena, Glasgow, Scotland
8 November 2022
Hard (i)

Slovakia
1

			1	2	3
1	(Australia) (Slovakia)	Storm Sanders; Viktória Kužmová	6; 4	6; 3
2	(Australia) (Slovakia)	Ajla Tomljanović; Anna Karolína Schmiedlová	6; 1	6; 2
3	(Australia) (Slovakia)	Ellen Perez / Storm Sanders; Viktória Kužmová / Tereza Mihalíková	6; 2	3; 6	[6] [10]

==== Slovakia vs. Belgium ====
Slovakia
2
Emirates Arena, Glasgow, Scotland
9 November 2022
Hard (i)

Belgium
1

			1	2	3
1	(Slovakia) (Belgium)	Viktória Kužmová; Ysaline Bonaventure	6; 2	7^{9} 6^{7}
2	(Slovakia) (Belgium)	Anna Karolína Schmiedlová; Maryna Zanevska	5; 7	6; 2	6; 3
3	(Slovakia) (Belgium)	Viktória Kužmová / Tereza Mihalíková; Kirsten Flipkens / Elise Mertens	0; 6	3; 6

==== Australia vs. Belgium ====
Australia
3
Emirates Arena, Glasgow, Scotland
10 November 2022
Hard (i)

Belgium
0

			1	2	3
1	(Australia) (Belgium)	Storm Sanders; Alison Van Uytvanck	6; 2	6; 2
2	(Australia) (Belgium)	Ajla Tomljanović; Elise Mertens	4; 6	6; 4	3; 0	retired
3	(Australia) (Belgium)	Storm Sanders / Samantha Stosur; Ysaline Bonaventure / Kirsten Flipkens	6; 4	6; 3

Note: Tomljanovic's retirement victory over Mertens was counted as a 4–6, 6–4, 6–0 win.

=== Group C ===
Pos.	Country	Ties	Matches	Sets	Sets %	Games	Games %
1	Great Britain	1–1	4–2	9–4	69%	66–53	55%
2	Spain	1–1	3–3	6–8	43%	59–71	45%
3	Kazakhstan	1–1	2–4	6–9	40%	70–71	50%

==== Kazakhstan vs. Great Britain ====
Kazakhstan
2
Emirates Arena, Glasgow, Scotland
8 November 2022
Hard (i)

Great Britain
1

			1	2	3
1	(Kazakhstan) (United Kingdom)	Yulia Putintseva; Katie Boulter	4; 6	6; 3	6; 2
2	(Kazakhstan) (United Kingdom)	Elena Rybakina; Harriet Dart	6; 1	6; 4
3	(Kazakhstan) (United Kingdom)	Anna Danilina / Elena Rybakina; Alicia Barnett / Olivia Nicholls	5; 7	3; 6

==== Spain vs. Kazakhstan ====
Spain
3
Emirates Arena, Glasgow, Scotland
9 November 2022
Hard (i)

Kazakhstan
0

			1	2	3
1	(Spain) (Kazakhstan)	Nuria Párrizas Díaz; Yulia Putintseva	6; 4	2; 6	7^{7} 6^{5}
2	(Spain) (Kazakhstan)	Paula Badosa; Elena Rybakina	6; 2	3; 6	6; 4
3	(Spain) (Kazakhstan)	Paula Badosa / Aliona Bolsova; Anna Danilina / Yulia Putintseva	6; 4	6; 2

==== Spain vs. Great Britain ====
Spain
0
Emirates Arena, Glasgow, Scotland
10 November 2022
Hard (i)

Great Britain
3

			1	2	3
1	(Spain) (United Kingdom)	Nuria Párrizas Díaz; Heather Watson	0; 6	2; 6
2	(Spain) (United Kingdom)	Paula Badosa; Harriet Dart	3; 6	4; 6
3	(Spain) (United Kingdom)	Aliona Bolsova / Rebeka Masarova; Alicia Barnett / Olivia Nicholls	6^{5} 7^{7}	2; 6

=== Group D ===
Pos.	Country	Ties	Matches	Sets	Sets %	Games	Games %
1	Czech Republic	2–0	4–2	8–4	67%	60–46	57%
2	United States	1–1	3–3	7–7	50%	65–66	50%
3	Poland	0–2	2–4	5–9	36%	56–69	45%

==== United States vs. Poland ====
United States
2
Emirates Arena, Glasgow, Scotland
9 November 2022
Hard (i)

Poland
1

			1	2	3
1	(United States) (Poland)	Danielle Collins; Magdalena Fręch	6; 4	3; 6	7^{7} 6^{2}
2	(United States) (Poland)	Madison Keys; Magda Linette	4; 6	6; 4	2; 6
3	(United States) (Poland)	Coco Gauff / Caty McNally; Magda Linette / Alicja Rosolska	6; 1	6; 2

==== Czech Republic vs. Poland ====
Czech Republic
2
Emirates Arena, Glasgow, Scotland
10 November 2022
Hard (i)

Poland
1

			1	2	3
1	(Czech Republic) (Poland)	Karolína Muchová; Magdalena Fręch	6; 2	6; 2
2	(Czech Republic) (Poland)	Karolína Plíšková; Magda Linette	4; 6	1; 6
3	(Czech Republic) (Poland)	Kateřina Siniaková / Markéta Vondroušová; Katarzyna Kawa / Magda Linette	6; 2	6; 3

==== Czech Republic vs. United States ====
Czech Republic
2
Emirates Arena, Glasgow, Scotland
11 November 2022
Hard (i)

United States
1

			1	2	3
1	(Czech Republic) (United States)	Markéta Vondroušová; Danielle Collins	6; 3	6; 3
2	(Czech Republic) (United States)	Kateřina Siniaková; Coco Gauff	7^{7} 6^{1}	6; 1
3	(Czech Republic) (United States)	Karolína Muchová / Karolína Plíšková; Madison Keys / Taylor Townsend	3; 6	3; 6

== Knockout stage ==
=== Bracket ===
Semifinals
Switzerland	2
Czech Republic	0
Great Britain	1
Australia	2

Final
Switzerland	2
Australia	0

=== Semifinals ===
==== Switzerland vs. Czech Republic ====
Switzerland
2
Emirates Arena, Glasgow, Scotland
12 November 2022
Hard (i)

Czech Republic
0

			1	2	3
1	(Switzerland) (Czech Republic)	Viktorija Golubic; Karolína Muchová	6; 4	6; 4
2	(Switzerland) (Czech Republic)	Belinda Bencic; Karolína Plíšková	6; 2	7^{8} 6^{6}
3	(Switzerland) (Czech Republic)	Belinda Bencic / Jil Teichmann; Kateřina Siniaková / Markéta Vondroušová				not played

==== Great Britain vs. Australia ====
Great Britain
1
Emirates Arena, Glasgow, Scotland
12 November 2022
Hard (i)

Australia
2

			1	2	3
1	(United Kingdom) (Australia)	Heather Watson; Storm Sanders	4; 6	6^{3} 7^{7}
2	(United Kingdom) (Australia)	Harriet Dart; Ajla Tomljanović	7^{7} 6^{3}	6; 2
3	(United Kingdom) (Australia)	Alicia Barnett / Olivia Nicholls; Storm Sanders / Samantha Stosur	6^{1} 7^{7}	7^{7} 6^{5}	[6] [10]

=== Final ===
==== Switzerland vs. Australia ====
Switzerland
2
Emirates Arena, Glasgow, Scotland
13 November 2022
Hard (i)

Australia
0

			1	2	3
1	(Switzerland) (Australia)	Jil Teichmann; Storm Sanders	6; 3	4; 6	6; 3
2	(Switzerland) (Australia)	Belinda Bencic; Ajla Tomljanović	6; 2	6; 1
3	(Switzerland) (Australia)	Belinda Bencic / Jil Teichmann; Storm Sanders / Samantha Stosur				not played
