= 2010 Fed Cup Europe/Africa Zone Group I – Pool D =

Group A of the 2010 Fed Cup Europe/Africa Zone Group I was one of four pools in the Europe/Africa Zone Group I of the 2010 Fed Cup. Four teams competed in a round-robin competition, with the top team and the bottom team proceeding to their respective sections of the play-offs: the top team played for advancement to the World Group II Play-offs, while the bottom team faced potential relegation to Group II.

		(Belarus) BLR	(United Kingdom) GBR	(Austria) AUT	(Bosnia and Herzegovina) BIH	RR; W–L	Set; W–L	Game; W–L	Standings
24	Belarus		1–2	1–2	3–0	1–2	12–7	95–73	3
30	Great Britain	2–1		0–3	3–0	2–1	10–9	89–77	2
37	Austria	2–1	3–0		3–0	3–0	15–3	99–57	1
46	Bosnia and Herzegovina	0–3	0–3	0–3		0–3	0–18	32–108	4

== Belarus vs. Austria ==
Belarus
1
Complexo de Tenis do Jamor, Estádio Nacional, Lisbon, Portugal
3 February 2010
Greenset Grand Prix hard (indoors)

Austria
2

			1	2	3
1	(Belarus) (Austria)	Olga Govortsova; Patricia Mayr	2; 6	2; 6
2	(Belarus) (Austria)	Victoria Azarenka; Sybille Bammer	7; 5	4; 6	0; 2	retired
3	(Belarus) (Austria)	Olga Govortsova / Tatiana Poutchek; Sandra Klemenschits / Yvonne Meusburger	6; 0	6; 2

== Great Britain vs. Bosnia and Herzegovina ==
Great Britain
3
Complexo de Tenis do Jamor, Estádio Nacional, Lisbon, Portugal
3 February 2010
Greenset Grand Prix hard (indoors)

Bosnia and Herzegovina
0

			1	2	3
1	(United Kingdom) (Bosnia and Herzegovina)	Katie O'Brien; Ema Burgić	6; 2	6; 0
2	(United Kingdom) (Bosnia and Herzegovina)	Elena Baltacha; Sandra Martinović	6; 1	6; 1
3	(United Kingdom) (Bosnia and Herzegovina)	Elena Baltacha / Sarah Borwell; Anita Husarić / Sandra Martinović	6; 3	6; 2

== Belarus vs. Bosnia and Herzegovina ==
Belarus
3
Complexo de Tenis do Jamor, Estádio Nacional, Lisbon, Portugal
4 February 2010
Greenset Grand Prix hard (indoors)

Bosnia and Herzegovina
0

			1	2	3
1	(Belarus) (Bosnia and Herzegovina)	Tatiana Poutchek; Ema Burgić	6; 1	6; 1
2	(Belarus) (Bosnia and Herzegovina)	Olga Govortsova; Sandra Martinović	6; 2	6; 3
3	(Belarus) (Bosnia and Herzegovina)	Ekaterina Dzehalevich / Tatiana Poutchek; Anita Husarić / Sandra Martinović	6; 4	6; 0

== Great Britain vs. Austria ==
Great Britain
0
Complexo de Tenis do Jamor, Estádio Nacional, Lisbon, Portugal
4 February 2010
Greenset Grand Prix hard (indoors)

Austria
3

			1	2	3
1	(United Kingdom) (Austria)	Anne Keothavong; Patricia Mayr	2; 6	2; 6
2	(United Kingdom) (Austria)	Elena Baltacha; Sybille Bammer	3; 6	3; 6
3	(United Kingdom) (Austria)	Sarah Borwell / Anne Keothavong; Patricia Mayr / Yvonne Meusburger	4; 6	4; 6

== Belarus vs. Great Britain ==
Belarus
1
Complexo de Tenis do Jamor, Estádio Nacional, Lisbon, Portugal
5 February 2010
Greenset Grand Prix hard (indoors)

Great Britain
2

			1	2	3
1	(Belarus) (United Kingdom)	Ekaterina Dzehalevich; Anne Keothavong	6^{8} 7^{10}	1; 6
2	(Belarus) (United Kingdom)	Olga Govortsova; Katie O'Brien	6; 3	6; 3
3	(Belarus) (United Kingdom)	Olga Govortsova / Tatiana Poutchek; Elena Baltacha / Sarah Borwell	6; 3	5; 7	2; 6

== Austria vs. Bosnia and Herzegovina ==
Austria
3
Complexo de Tenis do Jamor, Estádio Nacional, Lisbon, Portugal
5 February 2010
Greenset Grand Prix hard (indoors)

Bosnia and Herzegovina
0

			1	2	3
1	(Austria) (Bosnia and Herzegovina)	Yvonne Meusburger; Anita Husarić	6; 2	6; 1
2	(Austria) (Bosnia and Herzegovina)	Sybille Bammer; Ema Burgić	6; 2	6; 3
3	(Austria) (Bosnia and Herzegovina)	Sandra Klemenschits / Yvonne Meusburger; Ema Burgić / Anita Husarić	6; 2	6; 2

== See also ==
- Fed Cup structure
