= 2014 Fed Cup Europe/Africa Zone Group I – Pool B =

Group B of the 2014 Fed Cup Europe/Africa Zone Group I was one of four pools in the Europe/Africa zone of the 2014 Fed Cup. Four teams competed in a round robin competition, with the top team and the bottom team proceeding to their respective sections of the play-offs: the top team played for advancement to the World Group II Play-offs, while the bottom team faced potential relegation to Group II.

== Standings ==
		(United Kingdom) GBR	(Hungary) HUN	(Romania) ROU	(Latvia) LAT	RR; W–L	Match; W–L	Set; W–L	Game; W–L	Standings
17	Great Britain		1–2	1–2	2–1	1–2	4–5	11–12	115–111	3
30	Hungary	2–1		1–2	2–1	2–1	5–4	11–12	98–115	2
34	Romania	2–1	2–1		2–1	3–0	6–3	14–7	107–73	1
50	Latvia	1–2	1–2	1–2		0–3	3–6	8–13	87–108	4

== Round-robin ==
=== Great Britain vs. Latvia ===
Great Britain
2
Syma Sport and Events Centre, Budapest, Hungary
5 February 2014
Hard (indoors)

Latvia
1

			1	2	3
1	(United Kingdom) (Latvia)	Heather Watson; Jeļena Ostapenko	7; 5	6; 1
2	(United Kingdom) (Latvia)	Johanna Konta; Diāna Marcinkēviča	6; 3	4; 6	7; 5
3	(United Kingdom) (Latvia)	Jocelyn Rae / Heather Watson; Diāna Marcinkēviča / Jeļena Ostapenko	6; 1	5; 7	6^{5} 7^{7}

=== Hungary vs. Romania ===
Hungary
1
Syma Sport and Events Centre, Budapest, Hungary
5 February 2014
Hard (indoors)

Romania
2

			1	2	3
1	(Hungary) (Romania)	Réka-Luca Jani; Sorana Cîrstea	1; 6	0; 6
2	(Hungary) (Romania)	Tímea Babos; Simona Halep	1; 6	7; 5	6; 3
3	(Hungary) (Romania)	Tímea Babos / Réka-Luca Jani; Irina-Camelia Begu / Monica Niculescu	7^{7} 6^{5}	2; 6	0; 6

=== Great Britain vs. Romania ===
Great Britain
1
Syma Sport and Events Centre, Budapest, Hungary
7 February 2014
Hard (indoors)

Romania
2

			1	2	3
1	(United Kingdom) (Romania)	Heather Watson; Sorana Cîrstea	6^{7} 7^{9}	6; 1	6; 4
2	(United Kingdom) (Romania)	Johanna Konta; Simona Halep	1; 6	4; 6
3	(United Kingdom) (Romania)	Jocelyn Rae / Heather Watson; Irina-Camelia Begu / Monica Niculescu	0; 6	2; 6

=== Hungary vs. Latvia ===
Hungary
2
Syma Sport and Events Centre, Budapest, Hungary
7 February 2014
Hard (indoors)

Latvia
1

			1	2	3
1	(Hungary) (Latvia)	Réka-Luca Jani; Jeļena Ostapenko	6; 0	6; 4
2	(Hungary) (Latvia)	Tímea Babos; Diāna Marcinkēviča	2; 6	4; 6
3	(Hungary) (Latvia)	Tímea Babos / Réka-Luca Jani; Diāna Marcinkēviča / Jeļena Ostapenko	7; 5	3; 6	6; 1

=== Hungary vs. Great Britain ===
Hungary
2
Syma Sport and Events Centre, Budapest, Hungary
8 February 2014
Hard (indoors)

Great Britain
1

			1	2	3
1	(Hungary) (United Kingdom)	Réka-Luca Jani; Heather Watson	4; 6	1; 6
2	(Hungary) (United Kingdom)	Tímea Babos; Johanna Konta	4; 6	7^{7} 6^{5}	6; 4
3	(Hungary) (United Kingdom)	Tímea Babos / Réka-Luca Jani; Johanna Konta / Tara Moore	5; 7	7; 5	6; 3

=== Romania vs. Latvia ===
Romania
2
Syma Sport and Events Centre, Budapest, Hungary
8 February 2014
Hard (indoors)

Latvia
1

			1	2	3
1	(Romania) (Latvia)	Irina-Camelia Begu; Jeļena Ostapenko	6; 3	6; 3
2	(Romania) (Latvia)	Monica Niculescu; Diāna Marcinkēviča	6; 3	6; 3
3	(Romania) (Latvia)	Sorana Cîrstea / Simona Halep; Dārta-Elizabete Emuliņa / Jeļena Ostapenko	3; 2			retired
