= Great Britain Billie Jean King Cup team =

British women's tennis team

Great Britain
- Captain: Anne Keothavong
- ITF ranking: 15 ▼ (8 November 2021)
- Colors: blue & white
- First year: 1963
- Years played: 58
- Ties played (W–L): 212 (138–74)
- Years in World Group: 14 (17-14)
- Runners-up: 4 (1967, 1971, 1972, 1981)
- Most total wins: Virginia Wade (66–33)
- Most singles wins: Virginia Wade (36–20)
- Most doubles wins: Virginia Wade (30–13)
- Best doubles team: Virginia Wade / Sue Barker (13–2)
- Most ties played: Virginia Wade (57)
- Most years played: Virginia Wade (17)

The Great Britain Billie Jean King Cup team represents the United Kingdom in Fed Cup tennis competition and are governed by the Lawn Tennis Association.

== History ==
Great Britain first competed in the first Fed Cup in 1963. They have reached the finals on five occasions, 1967, 1971, 1972, 1981 and 2022. Great Britain is one of only four nations to have participated every year since the tournament's inception.

=== Inaugural team ===
- Ann Jones
- Christine Truman Janes
- Deidre Catt

== Players ==
=== Current squad ===
Rankings as of 11 November 2022

Team representing Great Britain in 2022 Billie Jean King Cup qualifying round
Name	Born	First	Last		Ties	Win/Loss			Ranks	
Name	Born	First	Year	Tie	Ties	Sin	Dou	Tot	Sin	Dou
Harriet Dart	28 July 1996	2019	2022	Spain	4	2–4	2–1	3–4	98	120
Heather Watson	19 May 1992	2011	2022	Spain	33	23–11	8–3	31–14	133	115
Katie Boulter	1 August 1996	2018	2022	Spain	8	7–2	2–0	9–2	124	—
Olivia Nicholls	26 October 1994	2022	2022	Spain	2	0–0	2–0	2–0	—	63
Alicia Barnett	18 October 1993	2022	2022	Spain	2	0–0	2–0	2–0	817	60

=== Recent call-ups ===
Rankings as of April 2022

The following players have been called up in the previous two years
Name	Born	First	Last		Ties	Win/Loss			Ranks	
Name	Born	First	Year	Tie	Ties	Sin	Dou	Tot	Sin	Dou
Emma Raducanu	13 November 2002	2020	2022	Czech Republic	1	1–1	0–0	1–1	12	—
Sonay Kartal	28 October 2001	2022	2022	Czech Republic	0	0–0	0–0	0–0	197	561
Jodie Anna Burrage	28 May 1999	2021	2021	Mexico	0	0–0	0–0	0–0	262	391
Katie Swan	24 March 1999	2016	2022	Czech Republic	6	2–1	2–1	4–2	221	484

== Team performances ==
=== 2020s ===
Year	Competition	Date	Surface	Location	Opponent	Score	Result
2020-2021	Qualifying round	7–8 February 20	Clay (i)	Bratislava (SVK)	Slovakia	1–3	Loss
2020-2021	Play-offs	16–17 April 21	Hard (i)	London (GBR)	Mexico	3–1	Win
2022	Qualifying round	15–16 April 22	Clay	Prague (CZE)	Czech Republic	2–3	Loss
2022	Finals	10 November 22	Hard (i)	Glasgow (GBR)	Kazakhstan	1–2	Loss
2022	Finals	11 November 22	Hard (i)	Glasgow (GBR)	Spain	3–0	Win
2022	Finals	12 November 22	Hard (i)	Glasgow (GBR)	Australia	1-2	Loss
2023	Qualifying round	14-15 April 2023	Hard (i)	Coventry (GBR)	France	1-3	Loss
2023	Play-offs	10-11 November 2023	Hard (i)	London (GBR)	Sweden	3-1	Win
2024	Qualifying round	12-13 April 2024	Clay (i)	Le Portel (FRA)	France	3-1	Win

=== 2010s ===
Year	Competition	Date	Surface	Location	Opponent	Score	Result
2010	Europe/Africa Zone Group I	3 Feb	Hard (i)	Lisbon (POR)	Bosnia and Herzegovina	3–0	Win
2010	Europe/Africa Zone Group I	4 Feb	Hard (i)	Lisbon (POR)	Austria	0–3	Loss
2010	Europe/Africa Zone Group I	5 Feb	Hard (i)	Lisbon (POR)	Belarus	2–1	Win
2010	Europe/Africa Zone Group I, 5th–8th play-off	6 Feb	Hard (i)	Lisbon (POR)	Netherlands	1–2	Loss
2011	Europe/Africa Zone Group I	2 Feb	Hard	Eilat (ISR)	Switzerland	1–2	Loss
2011	Europe/Africa Zone Group I	4 Feb	Hard	Eilat (ISR)	Denmark	2–1	Win
2011	Europe/Africa Zone Group I, 5th–8th play-off	5 Feb	Hard	Eilat (ISR)	Croatia	2–0	Win
2012	Europe/Africa Zone Group I	1 Feb	Hard	Eilat (ISR)	Portugal	3–0	Win
2012	Europe/Africa Zone Group I	2 Feb	Hard	Eilat (ISR)	Netherlands	2–1	Win
2012	Europe/Africa Zone Group I	3 Feb	Hard	Eilat (ISR)	Israel	3–0	Win
2012	Europe/Africa Zone Group I, Promotional play-off	4 Feb	Hard	Eilat (ISR)	Austria	2–0	Win
2012	World Group II play-offs	21–22 Apr	Hard (i)	Borås (SWE)	Sweden	1–4	Loss
2013	Europe/Africa Zone Group I	7 Feb	Hard	Eilat (ISR)	Bosnia and Herzegovina	3–0	Win
2013	Europe/Africa Zone Group I	8 Feb	Hard	Eilat (ISR)	Portugal	2–1	Win
2013	Europe/Africa Zone Group I	9 Feb	Hard	Eilat (ISR)	Hungary	2–1	Win
2013	Europe/Africa Zone Group I, Promotional play-off	10 Feb	Hard	Eilat (ISR)	Bulgaria	2–0	Win
2013	World Group II play-offs	20–21 Apr	Clay	Buenos Aires (ARG)	Argentina	1–3	Loss
2014	Europe/Africa Zone Group I	5 Feb	Hard (i)	Budapest (HUN)	Latvia	2–1	Win
2014	Europe/Africa Zone Group I	7 Feb	Hard (i)	Budapest (HUN)	Romania	1–2	Loss
2014	Europe/Africa Zone Group I	8 Feb	Hard (i)	Budapest (HUN)	Hungary	1–2	Loss
2014	Europe/Africa Zone Group I, 9th–12th play-off	9 Feb	Hard (i)	Budapest (HUN)	Austria	2–0	Win
2015	Europe/Africa Zone Group I	4 Feb	Hard (i)	Budapest (HUN)	Liechtenstein	3–0	Win
2015	Europe/Africa Zone Group I	5 Feb	Hard (i)	Budapest (HUN)	Turkey	1–2	Loss
2015	Europe/Africa Zone Group I	6 Feb	Hard (i)	Budapest (HUN)	Ukraine	3–0	Win
2015	Europe/Africa Zone Group I, Promotional play-off	7 Feb	Hard (i)	Budapest (HUN)	Belarus	0–2	Loss
2016	Europe/Africa Zone Group I	4 Feb	Hard	Eilat (ISR)	South Africa	3–0	Win
2016	Europe/Africa Zone Group I	5 Feb	Hard	Eilat (ISR)	Georgia	2–1	Win
2016	Europe/Africa Zone Group I, Promotional play-off	6 Feb	Hard	Eilat (ISR)	Belgium	0–2	Loss
2017	Europe/Africa Zone Group I	8 Feb	Hard (i)	Tallinn (EST)	Portugal	3–0	Win
2017	Europe/Africa Zone Group I	9 Feb	Hard (i)	Tallinn (EST)	Latvia	3–0	Win
2017	Europe/Africa Zone Group I	10 Feb	Hard (i)	Tallinn (EST)	Turkey	3–0	Win
2017	Europe/Africa Zone Group I, Promotional play-off	11 Feb	Hard (i)	Tallinn (EST)	Croatia	2–1	Win
2017	World Group II play-offs	22–23 Apr	Clay	Constanța (ROU)	Romania	2–3	Loss
2018	Europe/Africa Zone Group I	7 Feb	Hard (i)	Tallinn (EST)	Portugal	3–0	Win
2018	Europe/Africa Zone Group I	9 Feb	Hard (i)	Tallinn (EST)	Estonia	3–0	Win
2018	Europe/Africa Zone Group I, Promotional play-off	10 Feb	Hard (i)	Tallinn (EST)	Hungary	2–0	Win
2018	World Group II play-offs	21–22 Apr	Hard (i)	Miki (JPN)	Japan	2–3	Loss
2019	Europe/Africa Zone Group I	6 Feb	Hard (i)	Bath (GBR)	Slovenia	3–0	Win
2019	Europe/Africa Zone Group I	7 Feb	Hard (i)	Bath (GBR)	Greece	3–0	Win
2019	Europe/Africa Zone Group I	8 Feb	Hard (i)	Bath (GBR)	Hungary	2–0	Win
2019	Europe/Africa Zone Group I, Promotional play-off	9 Feb	Hard (i)	Bath (GBR)	Serbia	2–0	Win
2019	World Group II play-offs	20–21 Apr	Hard (i)	London (GBR)	Kazakhstan	3–1	Win

=== Earlier Years ===
Legend
World Group
World Group Play-off
World Group II
World Group II Play-off
Europe/Africa Group

==== 1963–1969 ====
Year	Competition	Date	Location	Round	Opponent	Score	Result
1963	Knockout	17–20 June	London, (ENG)	First	Canada	3–0	Won
1963	Knockout	17–20 June	London, (ENG)	Quarterfinal	Austria	3–0	Won
1963	Knockout	17–20 June	London, (ENG)	Semifinal	United States	0–3	Lost
1964	Knockout	17–20 June	Philadelphia, (USA)	Second	Norway	3–0	Won
1964	Knockout	17–20 June	Philadelphia, (USA)	Quarterfinal	South Africa	2–1	Won
1964	Knockout	17–20 June	Philadelphia, (USA)	Semifinal	United States	0–3	Lost
1965	Knockout	15–18 January	Melbourne, (AUS)	Quarterfinal	South Africa	2–1	Won
1965	Knockout	15–18 January	Melbourne, (AUS)	Semifinal	United States	0–3	Lost
1966	Knockout	10-16 May	Turin, (ITA)	Second	Canada	3–0	Won
1966	Knockout	10-16 May	Turin, (ITA)	Quarterfinal	Czech Republic	3–0	Won
1966	Knockout	10-16 May	Turin, (ITA)	Semifinal	United States	1–2	Lost
1967	Knockout	6–11 June	Berlin, (GER)	Second	Sweden	3–0	Won
1967	Knockout	6–11 June	Berlin, (GER)	Quarterfinal	Italy	2–1	Won
1967	Knockout	6–11 June	Berlin, (GER)	Semifinal	Australia	3–0	Won
1967	Knockout	6–11 June	Berlin, (GER)	Final	United States	0–3	Lost
1968	Knockout	21-26 May	Paris, (FRA)	First	Sweden	3–0	Won
1968	Knockout	21-26 May	Paris, (FRA)	Second	Czech Republic	2–1	Won
1968	Knockout	21-26 May	Paris, (FRA)	Quarterfinal	Soviet Union	3–0	Won
1968	Knockout	21-26 May	Paris, (FRA)	Semifinal	Australia	0–3	Lost
1969	Knockout	19-25 May	Athens, (GRE)	Second	Belgium	3–0	Won
1969	Knockout	19-25 May	Athens, (GRE)	Quarterfinal	Germany	2–1	Won
1969	Knockout	19-25 May	Athens, (GRE)	Semifinal	Australia	0–3	Lost

==== 1970–1979 ====
Year	Competition	Date	Location	Round	Opponent	Score	Result
1970	Knockout	19-24 May	Freiburg, (GER)	First	New Zealand	3–0	Won
1970	Knockout	19-24 May	Freiburg, (GER)	Quarterfinal	Netherlands	2–1	Won
1970	Knockout	19-24 May	Freiburg, (GER)	Semifinal	Australia	0–3	Lost
1971	Knockout	26–29 December	Perth, (AUS)	Quarterfinal	New Zealand	3–0	Won
1971	Knockout	26–29 December	Perth, (AUS)	Semifinal	United States	3–0	Won
1971	Knockout	26–29 December	Perth, (AUS)	Final	Australia	0–3	Lost
1972	Knockout	20–25 March	Johannesburg, (SA)	First	Japan	3–0	Won
1972	Knockout	20–25 March	Johannesburg, (SA)	Second	Argentina	2–1	Won
1972	Knockout	20–25 March	Johannesburg, (SA)	Quarterfinal	Germany	2–1	Won
1972	Knockout	20–25 March	Johannesburg, (SA)	Semifinal	Australia	2–1	Won
1972	Knockout	20–25 March	Johannesburg, (SA)	Final	South Africa	1–2	Lost
1973	Knockout	30 April- 6 May	Bad Homburg, (GER)	Second	Mexico	3–0	Won
1973	Knockout	30 April- 6 May	Bad Homburg, (GER)	Quarterfinal	Romania	1–2	Lost
1974	Knockout	13-19 May	Naples, (ITA)	First	Ireland	3–0	Won
1974	Knockout	13-19 May	Naples, (ITA)	Second	Norway	3–0	Won
1974	Knockout	13-19 May	Naples, (ITA)	Quarterfinal	South Africa	2–1	Won
1974	Knockout	13-19 May	Naples, (ITA)	Semifinal	Australia	0–3	Lost
1975	Knockout	5-11 May	Aix-en-Provence, (FRA)	First	Austria	3–0	Won
1975	Knockout	5-11 May	Aix-en-Provence, (FRA)	Second	Spain	2–0	Won
1975	Knockout	5-11 May	Aix-en-Provence, (FRA)	Quarterfinal	France	1–2	Lost
1976	Knockout	22–29 August	Philadelphia, (USA)	First	France	3–0	Won
1976	Knockout	22–29 August	Philadelphia, (USA)	Second	Hungary	w/o	Won
1976	Knockout	22–29 August	Philadelphia, (USA)	Quarterfinal	South Africa	2–1	Won
1976	Knockout	22–29 August	Philadelphia, (USA)	Semifinal	Australia	0–3	Lost
1977	Knockout	13–18 June	Eastbourne, (ENG)	First	Denmark	3–0	Won
1977	Knockout	13–18 June	Eastbourne, (ENG)	Second	South Korea	3–0	Won
1977	Knockout	13–18 June	Eastbourne, (ENG)	Quarterfinal	Sweden	3–0	Won
1977	Knockout	13–18 June	Eastbourne, (ENG)	Semifinal	Australia	1–2	Lost
1978	Knockout	27 November - 3 December	Melbourne, (AUS)	First	Spain	3–0	Won
1978	Knockout	27 November - 3 December	Melbourne, (AUS)	Second	Germany	2–1	Won
1978	Knockout	27 November - 3 December	Melbourne, (AUS)	Quarterfinal	Czech Republic	2–1	Won
1978	Knockout	27 November - 3 December	Melbourne, (AUS)	Semifinal	United States	0–3	Lost
1979	Knockout	30 April - 6 May	Madrid, (ESP)	First	New Zealand	3–0	Won
1979	Knockout	30 April - 6 May	Madrid, (ESP)	Second	Belgium	3–0	Won
1979	Knockout	30 April - 6 May	Madrid, (ESP)	Quarterfinal	Czech Republic	1–2	Lost

==== 1980–1989 ====
Year	Competition	Date	Location	Round	Opponent	Score	Result
1980	Knockout	19-25 May	Berlin, (GER)	First	Israel	3–0	Won
1980	Knockout	19-25 May	Berlin, (GER)	Second	Argentina	2–1	Won
1980	Knockout	19-25 May	Berlin, (GER)	Quarterfinal	Australia	0–3	Lost
1981	Knockout	9–15 November	Tokyo, (JPN)	First	Belgium	3–0	Won
1981	Knockout	9–15 November	Tokyo, (JPN)	Second	France	3–0	Won
1981	Knockout	9–15 November	Tokyo, (JPN)	Quarterfinal	Soviet Union	2–1	Won
1981	Knockout	9–15 November	Tokyo, (JPN)	Semifinal	Australia	2–1	Won
1981	Knockout	9–15 November	Tokyo, (JPN)	Final	United States	0–3	Lost
1982	Knockout	19–25 July	Santa Clara, California, (USA)	First	Italy	2–1	Won
1982	Knockout	19–25 July	Santa Clara, California, (USA)	Second	Israel	3–0	Won
1982	Knockout	19–25 July	Santa Clara, California, (USA)	Quarterfinal	Czech Republic	1–2	Lost
1983	Knockout	17–24 July	Zürich, (CHE)	First	Luxembourg	3–0	Won
1983	Knockout	17–24 July	Zürich, (CHE)	Second	Brazil	3–0	Won
1983	Knockout	17–24 July	Zürich, (CHE)	Quarterfinal	Germany	1–2	Lost
1984	Knockout	15–22 July	São Paulo, (BRA)	First	Bulgaria	0–3	Lost
1984	Consolation; Knockout	15–22 July	São Paulo, (BRA)	Second Con.	Hungary	2–1	Won
1984	Consolation; Knockout	15–22 July	São Paulo, (BRA)	Quarterfinal Con.	Canada	2–1	Won
1984	Consolation; Knockout	15–22 July	São Paulo, (BRA)	Semifinal Con.	Brazil	1–2	Lost
1985	Knockout	6–14 October	Nagoya, (JPN)	First	Germany	3–0	Won
1985	Knockout	6–14 October	Nagoya, (JPN)	Second	Japan	2–1	Won
1985	Knockout	6–14 October	Nagoya, (JPN)	Quarterfinal	Bulgaria	1–2	Lost
1986	Knockout	20–27 July	Prague, (CZE)	First	Denmark	0–3	Lost
1986	Consolation; Knockout	20–27 July	Prague, (CZE)	Second Con.	Finland	3–0	Won
1986	Consolation; Knockout	20–27 July	Prague, (CZE)	Quarterfinal Con.	Indonesia	3–0	Won
1986	Consolation; Knockout	20–27 July	Prague, (CZE)	Semifinal Con.	Hungary	3–0	Won
1986	Consolation; Knockout	20–27 July	Prague, (CZE)	Final Con.	Soviet Union	2–1	Won
1987	Knockout	26 July- 2 August	Vancouver, (CAN)	First	Chile	3–0	Won
1987	Knockout	26 July- 2 August	Vancouver, (CAN)	Second	Italy	2–1	Won
1987	Knockout	26 July- 2 August	Vancouver, (CAN)	Quarterfinal	United States	0–3	Lost
1988	Knockout	4–11 December	Melbourne, (AUS)	First	Indonesia	1–2	Lost
1988	Consolation; Knockout	4–11 December	Melbourne, (AUS)	Second Con.	Switzerland	2–1	Won
1988	Consolation; Knockout	4–11 December	Melbourne, (AUS)	Quarterfinal Con.	Chinese Taipei	3–0	Won
1988	Consolation; Knockout	4–11 December	Melbourne, (AUS)	Semifinal Con.	Belgium	2–1	Won
1988	Consolation; Knockout	4–11 December	Melbourne, (AUS)	Final Con.	Netherlands	1–2	Lost
1989	Knockout	1–9 October	Tokyo, (JPN)	First	Indonesia	3–0	Won
1989	Knockout	1–9 October	Tokyo, (JPN)	Second	Austria	1–2	Lost

==== 1990–1999 ====
Qualifying rounds were introduced from 1992, World Group II and World Group II play-offs were introduced from 1995

Year	Competition	Date	Location	Opponent	Score	Result
1990	Knockout	22–28 July	Norcross, Georgia, (USA)	Dominican Republic	3–0	Won
1990	Knockout	22–28 July	Norcross, Georgia, (USA)	Italy	2–1	Won
1990	Knockout	22–28 July	Norcross, Georgia, (USA)	Austria	1–2	Lost
1991	World Group	22–28 July	Nottingham, (ENG)	New Zealand	2–0	Won
1991	World Group	22–28 July	Nottingham, (ENG)	Italy	0–2	Lost
1992	World Group	13–19 July	Frankfurt, (GER)	United States	0–3	Lost
1992	World Group play-offs	13–19 July	Frankfurt, (GER)	Chile	3–0	Won
1992	World Group play-offs	13–19 July	Frankfurt, (GER)	Finland	1–2	Lost
1993	Europe/Africa Group I	10-15 May	Nottingham, (ENG)	Luxembourg	3–0	Won
1993	Europe/Africa Group I	10-15 May	Nottingham, (ENG)	Lithuania	3–0	Won
1993	Europe/Africa Group I	10-15 May	Nottingham, (ENG)	Russia	3–0	Won
1993	Europe/Africa Group I	10-15 May	Nottingham, (ENG)	Ukraine	3–0	Won
1993	Europe/Africa Group I play-offs	10-15 May	Nottingham, (ENG)	Luxembourg	3–0	Won
1993	World Group	19–20 July	Frankfurt, (GER)	Spain	0–3	Lost
1994	Europe/Africa Group I	19–23 April	Murcia, (ESP)	Luxembourg	3–0	Won
1994	Europe/Africa Group I	19–23 April	Murcia, (ESP)	Russia	2–1	Won
1994	Europe/Africa Group I Knockout	19–23 April	Murcia, (ESP)	Israel	3–0	Won
1994	Europe/Africa Group I Knockout	19–23 April	Murcia, (ESP)	Belgium	0–2	Lost
1995	Europe/Africa Group I	17–21 April	Murcia, (ESP)	Slovenia	1–2	Lost
1995	Europe/Africa Group I	17–21 April	Murcia, (ESP)	Czech Republic	0–3	Lost
1995	Europe/Africa Group I	17–21 April	Murcia, (ESP)	Poland	2–1	Won
1996	Europe/Africa Group I	22–24 April	Murcia, (ESP)	Russia	0–3	Lost
1996	Europe/Africa Group I	22–24 April	Murcia, (ESP)	Belarus	1–2	Lost
1996	Europe/Africa Group I	22–24 April	Murcia, (ESP)	Slovenia	2–1	Won
1997	Europe/Africa Group II	5-11 May	Manavgat, (TUR)	Portugal	2–1	Won
1997	Europe/Africa Group II	5-11 May	Manavgat, (TUR)	Estonia	3–0	Won
1997	Europe/Africa Group II	5-11 May	Manavgat, (TUR)	Armenia	3–0	Won
1997	Europe/Africa Group II	5-11 May	Manavgat, (TUR)	Lithuania	3–0	Won
1997	Europe/Africa Group II	5-11 May	Manavgat, (TUR)	Egypt	3–0	Won
1998	Europe/Africa Group I	14–16 April	Murcia, (ESP)	Portugal	1–2	Lost
1998	Europe/Africa Group I	14–16 April	Murcia, (ESP)	Poland	1–2	Lost
1998	Europe/Africa Group I	14–16 April	Murcia, (ESP)	Madagascar	3–0	Won
1999	Europe/Africa Group I	19–23 April	Murcia, (ESP)	Finland	3–0	Won
1999	Europe/Africa Group I	19–23 April	Murcia, (ESP)	(Federal Republic of Yugoslavia) YUG	3–0	Won
1999	Europe/Africa Group I	19–23 April	Murcia, (ESP)	Bulgaria	2–1	Won
1999	Europe/Africa Group I Knockout	19–23 April	Murcia, (ESP)	Luxembourg	3–0	Won
1999	Europe/Africa Group I Knockout	19–23 April	Murcia, (ESP)	Romania	0–2	Lost

==== 2000–2009 ====
Year	Competition	Date	Location	Opponent	Score	Result
2000	Europe/Africa Group I	15-21 May	Murcia, (ESP)	Ukraine	2–1	Won
2000	Europe/Africa Group I	15-21 May	Murcia, (ESP)	Finland	2–1	Won
2000	Europe/Africa Group I	15-21 May	Murcia, (ESP)	Israel	1–2	Lost
2000	Europe/Africa Group I	15-21 May	Murcia, (ESP)	Luxembourg	1–2	Lost
2001	Europe/Africa Group I	24–28 April	Murcia, (ESP)	Sweden	0–3	Lost
2001	Europe/Africa Group I	24–28 April	Murcia, (ESP)	Romania	1–2	Lost
2001	Europe/Africa Group I	24–28 April	Murcia, (ESP)	Belarus	1–2	Lost
2002	Europe/Africa Group II	9–13 April	Pretoria, (RSA)	Malta	3–0	Won
2002	Europe/Africa Group II	9–13 April	Pretoria, (RSA)	Norway	3–0	Won
2002	Europe/Africa Group II, promotion playoffs	9–13 April	Pretoria, (RSA)	Lithuania	2–0	Won
2003	Europe/Africa Group I	21–26 April	Estoril, (POR)	Ireland	2–1	Won
2003	Europe/Africa Group I	21–26 April	Estoril, (POR)	Poland	2–1	Won
2003	Europe/Africa Group I	21–26 April	Estoril, (POR)	Hungary	0–3	Lost
2003	Europe/Africa Group I	21–26 April	Estoril, (POR)	Netherlands	1–2	Lost
2004	Europe/Africa Group II	26 April – 1 May	Marsa, (MLT)	Romania	2–1	Won
2004	Europe/Africa Group II	26 April – 1 May	Marsa, (MLT)	Turkey	3–0	Won
2004	Europe/Africa Group II	26 April – 1 May	Marsa, (MLT)	Egypt	3–0	Won
2004	Europe/Africa Group II, promotion playoffs	26 April – 1 May	Marsa, (MLT)	Ireland	2–0	Won
2005	Europe/Africa Zone Group I	18–23 April	Manavgat, Antalya (TUR)	Slovakia	0–3	Lost
2005	Europe/Africa Zone Group I	18–23 April	Manavgat, Antalya (TUR)	Denmark	2–1	Won
2005	Europe/Africa Zone Group I	18–23 April	Manavgat, Antalya (TUR)	Serbia and Montenegro	2–1	Won
2005	Europe/Africa Zone Group I, playoffs	18–23 April	Manavgat, Antalya (TUR)	Ukraine	1–2	Lost
2006	Europe/Africa Zone Group I	18–23 April	Plovdiv (BUL)	Ukraine	2–1	Won
2006	Europe/Africa Zone Group I	18–23 April	Plovdiv (BUL)	Bulgaria	2–1	Won
2006	Europe/Africa Zone Group I	18–23 April	Plovdiv (BUL)	Hungary	2–1	Won
2006	Europe/Africa Zone Group I, promotion playoffs	18–23 April	Plovdiv (BUL)	Slovakia	1–2	Lost
2007	Europe/Africa Zone Group I	18–21 April	Plovdiv (BUL)	Bulgaria	3–0	Won
2007	Europe/Africa Zone Group I	18–21 April	Plovdiv (BUL)	Luxembourg	1–2	Lost
2007	Europe/Africa Zone Group I	18–21 April	Plovdiv (BUL)	Poland	0–3	Lost
2007	Europe/Africa Zone Group I, playoffs	18–21 April	Plovdiv (BUL)	Sweden	0–3	Lost
2008	Europe/Africa Zone Group I	30 January - 2 February	Budapest (HUN)	Switzerland	1–2	Lost
2008	Europe/Africa Zone Group I	30 January - 2 February	Budapest (HUN)	Hungary	1–2	Lost
2008	Europe/Africa Zone Group I	30 January - 2 February	Budapest (HUN)	Denmark	1–2	Lost
2008	Europe/Africa Zone Group I, relegation playoffs	30 January - 2 February	Budapest (HUN)	Portugal	2–0	Won
2009	Europe/Africa Zone Group I	4–7 February	Tallinn (EST)	Hungary	3–0	Won
2009	Europe/Africa Zone Group I	4–7 February	Tallinn (EST)	Netherlands	3–0	Won
2009	Europe/Africa Zone Group I	4–7 February	Tallinn (EST)	Luxembourg	3–0	Won
2009	Europe/Africa Zone Group I, promotion playoffs	4–7 February	Tallinn (EST)	Poland	1–2	Lost

== See also ==
- Billie Jean King Cup
- Great Britain Davis Cup team
- Great Britain at the Hopman Cup
- Lawn Tennis Association
