= 2019 Fed Cup World Group II play-offs =

Part of tennis tournament

The 2019 World Group II play-offs was a Fed Cup tennis tournament consisting of four ties involving the losing nations of the World Group II and four nations from the three Zonal Group I competitions.

At the time of the ties taking place, it was expected that the winners would secure a place in the World Group II for 2020, while the losers would be relegated to their respective zonal Group I, in accordance with the existing competition structure.

However, the restructuring of the Fed Cup for 2020 announced on 27 June 2019 stipulated that the four winning nations will instead enter the 2020 Fed Cup Qualifiers. Of the four losing nations, the two with the highest ITF Fed Cup Nations Ranking (as of 22 April 2019) will also enter the 2020 Fed Cup Qualifiers, while only the remaining two losing nations will be relegated to their respective zonal Group I.

Participating Teams
| Brazil | Great Britain | Italy | Japan |
| Kazakhstan | Netherlands | Russia | Slovakia |

== Seeding ==
The seeding was announced on 11 February 2019.

Seeds:

1. Russia
2. Netherlands
3. Great Britain
4. Slovakia

Remaining nations:

1. Brazil
2. Italy
3. Japan
4. Kazakhstan

== Russia vs. Italy ==
Russia
4
CSKA Sports Complex, Moscow, Russia
20–21 April
Clay (indoor)

Italy
0

| | | | 1 | 2 | 3 |
|---|---|---|---|---|---|---|
| 1 | (Russia) (Italy) | Anastasia Potapova; Martina Trevisan | 2; 6 | 6; 3 | 6; 1 |
| 2 | (Russia) (Italy) | Anastasia Pavlyuchenkova; Jasmine Paolini | 7^{7} 6^{4} | 7^{7} 6^{5} |
| 3 | (Russia) (Italy) | Anastasia Pavlyuchenkova; Martina Trevisan | 6; 4 | 6; 3 |
| 4 | (Russia) (Italy) | Anastasia Potapova; Jasmine Paolini | | | | not played |
| 5 | (Russia) (Italy) | Vlada Koval / Anastasia Potapova; Sara Errani / Jasmine Paolini | 4; 6 | 6; 3 | 10; 7 |

== Japan vs. Netherlands ==
Japan
4
Utsubo Tennis Center, Osaka, Japan
20–21 April
Hard

Netherlands
0

| | | | 1 | 2 | 3 |
|---|---|---|---|---|---|---|
| 1 | (Japan) (Netherlands) | Misaki Doi; Richèl Hogenkamp | 6; 3 | 6; 4 |
| 2 | (Japan) (Netherlands) | Nao Hibino; Bibiane Schoofs | 6; 1 | 6; 2 |
| 3 | (Japan) (Netherlands) | Misaki Doi; Bibiane Schoofs | 6; 3 | 6; 2 |
| 4 | (Japan) (Netherlands) | Nao Hibino; Richèl Hogenkamp | | | | not played |
| 5 | (Japan) (Netherlands) | Shuko Aoyama / Eri Hozumi; Lesley Kerkhove / Demi Schuurs | 6; 3 | 3; 6 | 10; 6 |

== Great Britain vs. Kazakhstan ==
Great Britain
3
Copper Box Arena, London, Great Britain
20–21 April
Hard (indoor)

Kazakhstan
1

| | | | 1 | 2 | 3 |
|---|---|---|---|---|---|---|
| 1 | (United Kingdom) (Kazakhstan) | Johanna Konta; Zarina Diyas | 4; 6 | 6; 3 | 6; 2 |
| 2 | (United Kingdom) (Kazakhstan) | Katie Boulter; Yulia Putintseva | 6; 3 | 2; 6 | 6^{6} 7^{8} |
| 3 | (United Kingdom) (Kazakhstan) | Johanna Konta; Yulia Putintseva | 4; 6 | 6; 2 | 7; 5 |
| 4 | (United Kingdom) (Kazakhstan) | Katie Boulter; Zarina Diyas | 6^{1} 7^{7} | 6; 4 | 6; 1 |
| 5 | (United Kingdom) (Kazakhstan) | Harriet Dart / Heather Watson; Anna Danilina / Galina Voskoboeva | | | | not played |

== Slovakia vs. Brazil ==
Slovakia
3
AXA Aréna NTC, Bratislava, Slovakia
20–21 April
Clay (indoor)

Brazil
1

| | | | 1 | 2 | 3 |
|---|---|---|---|---|---|---|
| 1 | (Slovakia) (Brazil) | Dominika Cibulková; Carolina Alves | 6; 1 | 6; 1 |
| 2 | (Slovakia) (Brazil) | Viktória Kužmová; Beatriz Haddad Maia | 6; 3 | 6; 3 |
| 3 | (Slovakia) (Brazil) | Dominika Cibulková; Beatriz Haddad Maia | 7^{7} 6^{3} | 6; 0 |
| 4 | (Slovakia) (Brazil) | Viktória Kužmová; Carolina Alves | | | | not played |
| 5 | (Slovakia) (Brazil) | Viktória Kužmová / Rebecca Šramková; Carolina Alves / Luisa Stefani | 1; 6 | 3; 6 |

== Status of losing teams ==
Russia, Japan, Great Britain and Slovakia entered the 2020 Fed Cup Qualifiers, having won their respective World Group II play-off ties. The fate of the four losing nations depended on their ITF Fed Cup Nations Ranking as of 22 April 2019.

| Nation | ITF Fed Cup Nations Ranking (as of 22 April 2019) | Status |
|---|---|---|
| Kazakhstan | 17 | Entry into 2020 Fed Cup Qualifiers |
| Brazil | 18 | Entry into 2020 Fed Cup Qualifiers |
| Netherlands | 19 | Entry into 2020 Europe/Africa Group I |
| Italy | 24 | Entry into 2020 Europe/Africa Group I |
