= 2020 Billie Jean King Cup play-offs =

Part of tennis tournament

The 2020–21 Billie Jean King Cup play-offs was originally scheduled to be held from 17 to 18 April 2020 but was postponed to the following year due to COVID-19. The eight winners of this round will qualify for the 2022 Billie Jean King Cup qualifying round while the eight losers will contest their respective regional Group I event in 2022.

== Teams ==
Sixteen teams will play for eight spots in the 2021 qualifying round, in series decided on a home and away basis.

These Sixteen teams are:

- 8 losing teams from Qualifying round.
- 8 winning teams from their Group I zone.

Eight winners will advance to the 2021 qualifying round and eight losers will contest their respective regional Group I event in 2021.

Seeded teams

- Brazil
- Canada
- Great Britain
- Japan
- Kazakhstan
- Latvia
- Netherlands
- Romania

Unseeded teams

- Argentina
- China
- India
- Italy
- Mexico
- Poland
- Serbia
- Ukraine

== Results summary ==
Home team	Score	Away team	Location	Venue	Surface
Poland	3–2	Brazil	Bytom	Hala na Skarpie	Hard (i)
Great Britain	3–1	Mexico	London	National Tennis Centre	Hard (i)
Serbia	0–4	Canada	Kraljevo	Kraljevo Sports Hall	Hard (i)
Latvia	3–1	India	Jūrmala	National Tennis Centre Lielupe	Hard (i)
Ukraine	4–0	Japan	Chornomorsk	Elite Tennis Club	Clay
Romania	1–3	Italy	Cluj-Napoca	BTarena	Hard (i)
Argentina	2–3	Kazakhstan	Córdoba	Córdoba Lawn Tennis Club	Clay
Netherlands	3–2	China	's-Hertogenbosch	Maaspoort	Clay (i)

== Play-offs results ==
=== Poland vs. Brazil ===
Poland
3
Hala na Skarpie, Bytom, Poland
16–17 April 2021
Hard (indoor)

Brazil
2

			1	2	3
1	(Poland) (Brazil)	Magdalena Fręch; Carolina Alves	6; 4	6; 3
2	(Poland) (Brazil)	Urszula Radwańska; Laura Pigossi	6^{9} 7^{11}	6; 3	2; 6
3	(Poland) (Brazil)	Magdalena Fręch; Laura Pigossi	4; 6	6; 3	7^{7} 6^{4}
4	(Poland) (Brazil)	Katarzyna Kawa; Carolina Alves	3; 6	5; 7
5	(Poland) (Brazil)	Magdalena Fręch / Katarzyna Kawa; Carolina Alves / Luisa Stefani	1; 6	6; 2	6; 4

=== Great Britain vs. Mexico ===
Great Britain
3
National Tennis Centre, London, United Kingdom
16–17 April 2021
Hard (indoor)

Mexico
1

			1	2	3
1	(United Kingdom) (Mexico)	Katie Boulter; Marcela Zacarías	7; 5	6; 0
2	(United Kingdom) (Mexico)	Heather Watson; Giuliana Olmos	7; 5	6; 1
3	(United Kingdom) (Mexico)	Heather Watson; Marcela Zacarías	3; 6	6^{1} 7^{7}
4	(United Kingdom) (Mexico)	Katie Boulter; Giuliana Olmos	6; 4	6; 1
5	(United Kingdom) (Mexico)	Harriet Dart / Heather Watson; Fernanda Contreras Gómez / Giuliana Olmos				not played

=== Serbia vs. Canada ===
Serbia
0
Kraljevo Sport Hall, Kraljevo, Serbia
16–17 April 2021
Hard (indoor)

Canada
4

			1	2	3
1	(Serbia) (Canada)	Olga Danilović; Leylah Annie Fernandez	5; 7	6; 4	4; 6
2	(Serbia) (Canada)	Nina Stojanović; Rebecca Marino	4; 6	6^{6} 7^{8}
3	(Serbia) (Canada)	Nina Stojanović; Leylah Annie Fernandez	6; 3	3; 6	4; 6
4	(Serbia) (Canada)	Olga Danilović; Rebecca Marino				not played
5	(Serbia) (Canada)	Ivana Jorović / Aleksandra Krunić; Rebecca Marino / Carol Zhao	7^{7} 6^{4}	3; 6	[0] [10]

=== Latvia vs. India ===
Latvia
3
National Tennis Centre Lielupe, Jūrmala, Latvia
16–17 April 2021
Hard (indoor)

India
1

			1	2	3
1	(Latvia) (India)	Jeļena Ostapenko; Ankita Raina	6; 2	5; 7	7; 5
2	(Latvia) (India)	Anastasija Sevastova; Karman Thandi	6; 4	6; 0
3	(Latvia) (India)	Anastasija Sevastova; Ankita Raina	6; 0	7^{7} 6^{4}
4	(Latvia) (India)	Jeļena Ostapenko; Karman Thandi				not played
5	(Latvia) (India)	Patrīcija Špaka / Daniela Vismane; Rutuja Bhosale / Zeel Desai	4; 6	7; 5	[2] [10]

=== Ukraine vs. Japan ===
Ukraine
4
Elite Tennis Club, Chornomorsk, Ukraine
16–17 April 2021
Clay

Japan
0

			1	2	3
1	(Ukraine) (Japan)	Elina Svitolina; Chihiro Muramatsu	6; 3	6; 2
2	(Ukraine) (Japan)	Marta Kostyuk; Yuki Naito	6; 3	6; 3
3	(Ukraine) (Japan)	Elina Svitolina; Yuki Naito	6; 2	4; 6	7^{7} 6^{3}
4	(Ukraine) (Japan)	Marta Kostyuk; Chihiro Muramatsu				not played
5	(Ukraine) (Japan)	Lyudmyla Kichenok / Nadiia Kichenok; Shiho Akita / Himari Satō	6; 2	7^{7} 6^{2}

=== Romania vs. Italy ===
Romania
1
BTarena, Cluj-Napoca, Romania
16–17 April 2021
Hard (indoor)

Italy
3

			1	2	3
1	(Romania) (Italy)	Irina Bara; Elisabetta Cocciaretto	1; 6	4; 6
2	(Romania) (Italy)	Mihaela Buzărnescu; Martina Trevisan	2; 6	6; 2	6^{5} 7^{7}
3	(Romania) (Italy)	Elena-Gabriela Ruse; Jasmine Paolini	1; 6	6; 3	6; 4
4	(Romania) (Italy)	Mihaela Buzărnescu; Elisabetta Cocciaretto	5; 7	6^{5} 7^{7}
5	(Romania) (Italy)	Monica Niculescu / Elena-Gabriela Ruse; Giulia Gatto-Monticone / Jasmine Paolini				not played

=== Argentina vs. Kazakhstan ===
Argentina
2
Córdoba Lawn Tennis Club, Córdoba, Argentina
16–17 April 2021
Clay

Kazakhstan
3

			1	2	3
1	(Argentina) (Kazakhstan)	Nadia Podoroska; Yulia Putintseva	6; 2	4; 6	0; 6
2	(Argentina) (Kazakhstan)	María Lourdes Carlé; Elena Rybakina	6; 4	3; 6	6; 0
3	(Argentina) (Kazakhstan)	Nadia Podoroska; Elena Rybakina	4; 6	4; 6
4	(Argentina) (Kazakhstan)	María Lourdes Carlé; Yulia Putintseva	6^{3} 7^{7}	7^{7} 6^{3}		retired
5	(Argentina) (Kazakhstan)	María Lourdes Carlé / Nadia Podoroska; Anna Danilina / Yaroslava Shvedova	0; 6	5; 7

=== Netherlands vs. China ===
Netherlands
3
Maaspoort, 's-Hertogenbosch, Netherlands
16–17 April 2021
Clay (indoor)

China
2

			1	2	3
1	(Netherlands) (China)	Kiki Bertens; Wang Xinyu	6; 2	6; 0
2	(Netherlands) (China)	Arantxa Rus; Wang Xiyu	1; 6	6; 3	2; 6
3	(Netherlands) (China)	Lesley Pattinama Kerkhove; Wang Xiyu	3; 6	7; 5	4; 6
4	(Netherlands) (China)	Arantxa Rus; Wang Xinyu	6; 4	4; 3		retired
5	(Netherlands) (China)	Arantxa Rus / Demi Schuurs; Xu Yifan / Zhang Shuai	6; 1	6; 4
