= Kazakhstan Billie Jean King Cup team =

Kazakhstani national women's tennis team

Kazakhstan
- Captain: Yuriy Schukin
- ITF ranking: 13 (16 November 2024)
- Colors: white
- First year: 1995
- Years played: 25
- Ties played (W–L): 105 (55–50)
- Best finish: World Group 2022 World Group 2023 World Group 2025
- Most total wins: Galina Voskoboeva (28–15)
- Most singles wins: Yulia Putintseva (19–11)
- Most doubles wins: Galina Voskoboeva (20–8)
- Best doubles team: Yaroslava Shvedova / Galina Voskoboeva (6–2)
- Most ties played: Galina Voskoboeva (32)
- Most years played: Yulia Putintseva (10)

The Kazakhstan Billie Jean King Cup team represents Kazakhstan in the Billie Jean King Cup tennis competition and are governed by the Kazakhstan Tennis Federation. They currently compete in the Final Qualifiers.

== Current team (2024) ==
- Elena Rybakina (singles)
- Yulia Putintseva (singles)
- Zarina Diyas (singles)
- Zhibek Kulambayeva (singles)
- Anna Danilina (doubles)
- Gozal Ainitdinova

== History ==
Kazakhstan competed in its first Fed Cup in 1995. Their best result was qualifying for the World Group II play-offs in 2013, 2017, and 2019, losing to France, Canada, and Great Britain. In 2020, Kazakhstan faced Belgium to earn opportunity to play in the World Group. Prior to 1993, Kazakh players represented the Soviet Union.

== Active players on WTA Tour ==
- Yulia Putintseva
- Zarina Diyas
- Gozal Ainitdinova
- Zhibek Kulambayeva
- Galina Voskoboeva
- Anna Danilina
- Elena Rybakina

== See also ==
- Billie Jean King Cup
- Kazakhstan Davis Cup team
- Kazakhstan at the Hopman Cup
- Kazakhstan Tennis Federation
