= 2024 ITF Women's World Tennis Tour =

Entry- and mid-level women's tennis season

Details
- Duration: 1 January – December 2024
- Edition: 31st
- Categories: W100 tournaments W75 tournaments W50 tournaments W35 tournaments W15 tournaments

Achievements (singles)
- Most titles: (Indonesia) Janice Tjen (7)
- Most finals: (United Kingdom) Sonay Kartal (Slovakia) Katarína Kužmová (Romania) Patricia Maria Țig (8)

The 2024 International Tennis Federation (ITF) Women's World Tennis Tour was the entry-level and mid-level tour for women's professional tennis. It was organized by the International Tennis Federation and was a tier below the WTA Challenger series of the Women's Tennis Association (WTA) Tour. The Tour provided a professional pathway between the ITF Junior World Tennis Tour and the WTA Tour. The results of ITF tournaments were incorporated into the WTA ranking, which enabled professionals to progress through to the elite levels of women's professional tennis. The ITF Women's World Tennis Tour offered approximately 500 tournaments across 65 countries and incorporates five prize money levels of tournaments: $15,000, $25,000, $40,000, $60,000 and $100,000.

Tournaments at $15,000 level included reserved main draw places for Top-100 ranked ITF Juniors, providing a smooth pathway for the best new talent to break through into elite professional tennis. The ITF Women's World Tennis Tour was also designed to target prize money effectively to help reduce costs for players and ultimately enable more players to make a living.

From 1 March 2022, following the Russian invasion of Ukraine the ITF announced that players from Belarus and Russia could still play on the tour but would not be allowed to play under the flag of Belarus or Russia.

== Cancelled/postponed tournaments ==
The following tournaments were formally announced by the ITF before being subsequently cancelled or postponed.

Week of	Tournament	Status
January 15	Boca Raton, United States; W35 – Clay	Postponed to April 8th
February 26	Aguascalientes, Mexico; W50 – Clay	Cancelled
April 1	La Bisbal d'Empordà, Spain; W100 – Clay	Upgraded to WTA 125 tournament
April 1	Antalya, Turkey; W15 – Clay	Cancelled
April 8	Charleston, United States; W100 – Clay	Cancelled
June 10	Říčany, Czechia; W35 – Clay	Cancelled
July 29	Kaspi, Georgia; W15 – Hard	Cancelled
August 5	Sapporo, Japan; W15 – Hard	Cancelled
August 5	Biella, Italy; W15 – Clay	Cancelled
August 5	Kaspi, Georgia; W15 – Hard	Cancelled

== Participating host nations ==
- Argentina (ARG)
- Armenia (ARM)
- Australia (AUS)
- Austria (AUT)
- Belgium (BEL)
- Bosnia and Herzegovina (BIH)
- Brazil (BRA)
- Bulgaria (BUL)
- Burundi (BDI)
- Canada (CAN)
- China (CHN)
- Chinese Taipei (TPE)
- Colombia (COL)
- Croatia (CRO)
- Cyprus (CYP)
- Czech Republic (CZE)
- Denmark (DEN)
- Dominican Republic (DOM)
- Egypt (EGY)
- Finland (FIN)
- France (FRA)
- Georgia (GEO)
- Germany (GER)
- Great Britain (GBR)
- Greece (GRE)
- Hong Kong (HKG)
- Hungary (HUN)
- Indonesia (IDN)
- India (IND)
- Ireland (IRE)
- Italy (ITA)
- Japan (JPN)
- Kazakhstan (KAZ)
- Kenya (KEN)
- Luxembourg (LUX)
- Malaysia (MAS)
- Mexico (MEX)
- Morocco (MAR)
- Netherlands (NED)
- New Zealand (NZL)
- Paraguay (PAR)
- Peru (PER)
- Poland (POL)
- Portugal (POR)
- Romania (ROU)
- Serbia (SRB)
- Singapore (SGP)
- Slovakia (SVK)
- Slovenia (SLO)
- South Africa (RSA)
- South Korea (KOR)
- Spain (SPA)
- Sweden (SWE)
- Switzerland (SUI)
- Thailand (THA)
- Tunisia (TUN)
- Turkey (TUR)
- United Arab Emirates (UAE)
- United States (USA)

== WTA ranking points distribution ==
Category	W	F	SF	QF	R16	R32	R64	Q	FQR	Q2	Q1
W100 (48S, 32Q)	100	65	39	21	12	7	1	5	3	–	–
W100 (32S, 32/24Q)	100	65	39	21	12	1	–	5	3	–	–
W100 (16D)	100	65	39	21	1	–	–	–	–	–	–
W75 (48S, 32Q)	75	49	29	16	9	5	1	3	2	–	–
W75 (32S, 32/24Q)	75	49	29	16	9	1	–	3	2	–	–
W75 (16D)	75	49	29	16	1	–	–	–	–	–	–
W50 (48S, 32Q)	50	33	20	11	6	3	1	2	1	–	–
W50 (32S, 32/24Q)	50	33	20	11	6	1	–	2	1	–	–
W50 (16D)	50	33	20	11	1	–	–	–	–	–	–
W35 (48S, 32Q)	35	23	14	8	4	2	1	1	–	–	–
W35 (32S, 32/24Q)	35	23	14	8	4	–	–	1	–	–	–
W35 (32S, 48/64Q)	35	23	14	8	4	–	–	1	–	–	–
W35 (16D)	35	23	14	8	1	–	–	–	–	–	–
W15 (32S, 32/24Q)	15	10	6	3	1	–	–	–	–	–	–
W15 (32S, 48/64Q)	15	10	6	3	1	–	–	–	–	–	–
W15 (16D)	15	10	6	1	–	–	–	–	–	–	–

== Prize money distribution ==
Category	W	F	SF	QF	R16	R32	R64	FQR	QRof32	QRof64
W100 (48S, 32Q)	$12,285	$6,495	$3,846	$2,378	$1,559	$926	$415	$381.75	$237	–
W100 (32S, 24/32/48/64Q)	$15,239	$8,147	$4,473	$2,573	$1,559	$926	–	$381.75	$237	–
W100 (16D)	$5,573	$2,787	$1,393	$760	$507	–	–	–	–	–
W75 (48S, 32Q)	$7,344	$3,882	$2,308	$1,427	$935	$557	$251	$228.75	$141.75	–
W75 (32S, 24/32/48/64Q)	$9,142	$4,886	$2,683	$1,543	$935	$557		$228.75	$141.75	–
W75 (16D)	$3,344	$1,672	$836	$456	$304	–	–	–	–	–
W50 (48S, 32Q)	$4,903	$2,591.67	$1,538.52	$951.51	$623.64	$370.58	$166.94	$152.61	$94.73	–
W50 (32S, 24/32/48/64Q)	$6,094	$3,257	$1,789	$1,029	$624	$370	–	$153	$95	–
W50 (16D)	$2,229.51	$1,114.82	$557.34	$304	$202.66	–	–	–	–	–
W35 (48S, 32Q)	$3,188	$1,684	$1,001	$617	$408	$244	$107	$96.50	$50	–
W35 (32S, 24/32/48/64Q)	$3,935	$2,107	$1,162	$672	$408	$244	–	$96.50	$50	–
W35 (16D)	$1,437	$719	$359	$196	$131	–	–	–	–	–
W15 (32S, 24/32/48/64Q)	$2,352	$1,470	$734	$367	$294	$147	–	–	–	–
W15 (16D)	$956	$515	$294	$147	$74	–	–	–	–	–

- All prize money in U.S. dollars
- Doubles prize money per team

== Statistics ==
=== Key ===
Category
W100 tournaments ($100,000)
W75 tournaments ($60,000)
W50 tournaments ($40,000)
W35 tournaments ($25,000)
W15 tournaments ($15,000)

These tables present the number of singles (S) and doubles (D) titles won by each player and each nation during the season. The players/nations are sorted by:

1. Total number of titles (a doubles title won by two players representing the same nation counts as only one win for the nation)
2. A singles > doubles hierarchy
3. Alphabetical order (by family names for players).

To avoid confusion and double counting, these tables should be updated only after all events of the week are completed.

=== Titles won by player ===
Updated as of 30 December

Total	Player	W100		W75		W50		W35		W15		Total	
Total	Player	S	D	S	D	S	D	S	D	S	D	S	D
13	Sapfo Sakellaridi (GRE)						1		7	1	4	1	12
11	Nina Vargová (SVK)							2	4	3	2	5	6
11	Stéphanie Visscher (NED)								4	3	4	3	8
11	Hiromi Abe (JPN)								2	1	8	1	10
10	Patricia Maria Țig (ROU)						2	2	1	4	1	6	4
10	Lisa Zaar (SWE)						1	1	2	1	5	1	9
10	Katarína Kužmová (SVK)								4	4	2	4	6
10	Radka Zelníčková (SVK)								3	3	4	3	7
9	Martyna Kubka (POL)						4		5			0	9
9	Ella McDonald (GBR)						1		4	2	2	2	7
9	Janice Tjen (INA)							1		6	2	7	2
8	Tereza Valentová (CZE)			2	1		1	1		2	1	5	3
8	Anna Rogers (USA)				2		3	1	2			1	7
8	Zhibek Kulambayeva (KAZ)				1		3		3	1		1	7
8	Jazmín Ortenzi (ARG)						1		2	3	2	3	5
7	Alicia Herrero Liñana (ESP)				2		1		3		1	0	7
7	Kayla Cross (CAN)				1			1	5			1	6
7	Lara Salden (BEL)						4		3			0	7
7	Anastasia Gasanova							1	1	4	1	5	2
7	Back Da-yeon (KOR)							1		3	3	4	3
7	Ksenia Laskutova								3	2	2	2	5
7	Luisina Giovannini (ARG)								1	3	3	3	4
7	Ștefania Bojică (ROU)										7	0	7
7	Sarah van Emst (NED)										7	0	7
6	Moyuka Uchijima (JPN)	3		1		1	1					5	1
6	Sonay Kartal (GBR)	1						5				6	0
6	Yvonne Cavallé Reimers (ESP)		1		3				2			0	6
6	Eva Vedder (NED)		1		1				4			0	6
6	Naho Sato (JPN)		1				2		2	1		1	5
6	Dominika Šalková (CZE)			2	2		2					2	4
6	Veronika Erjavec (SLO)			1	3		1	1				2	4
6	Melany Krywoj (ARG)				2				3		1	0	6
6	Aurora Zantedeschi (ITA)				2				3		1	0	6
6	Jessie Aney (USA)				1		2			1	2	1	5
6	Leonie Küng (SUI)				1			3	2			3	3
6	Solana Sierra (ARG)					2		4				6	0
6	Eudice Chong (HKG)					1	3	1	1			2	4
6	Magali Kempen (BEL)					1	2		3			1	5
6	Haley Giavara (USA)						2		3		1	0	6
6	Marie Benoît (BEL)						1	3	2			3	3
6	Cody Wong Hong-yi (HKG)						1	1	3		1	1	5
6	Holly Hutchinson (GBR)						1		2		3	0	6
6	Weronika Falkowska (POL)							2	4			2	4
6	Darja Viďmanová (CZE)							2		2	2	4	2
6	Yasmine Mansouri (FRA)							1	1	3	1	4	2
6	Daria Kuczer (POL)							1	1	1	3	2	4
6	Nika Radišić (SLO)								6			0	6
6	Laura Hietaranta (FIN)								5	1		1	5
6	Huang Yujia (CHN)								3	1	2	1	5
6	Daria Frayman (CYP)								1	3	2	3	3
6	Natalija Senić (SRB)								1	3	2	3	3
6	Celine Simunyu (IRL)								1		5	0	6
5	Maddison Inglis (AUS)	1		1	1		1	1				3	2
5	Céline Naef (SUI)		1	1	3							1	4
5	Matilde Jorge (POR)		1		1		1	1	1			1	4
5	Mingge Xu (GBR)		1					1	2		1	1	4
5	Eleni Christofi (GRE)		1						2		2	0	5
5	Jaimee Fourlis (AUS)				3			1	1			1	4
5	Justina Mikulskytė (LTU)				2	1	1	1				2	3
5	Maria Kozyreva				2	1			2			1	4
5	Sarah Beth Grey (GBR)				2				3			0	5
5	Petra Hule (AUS)				2				3			0	5
5	Maria Kononova				2				2		1	0	5
5	Maribella Zamarripa (USA)				2				2		1	0	5
5	Tiantsoa Sarah Rakotomanga Rajaonah (FRA)				1	1			1	1	1	2	3
5	Nicole Fossa Huergo (ITA)				1		2	1	1			1	4
5	Alana Smith (USA)				1		1		3			0	5
5	Amarissa Kiara Tóth (HUN)				1		1			3		3	2
5	Hikaru Sato (JPN)				1			1	2	1		2	3
5	Aneta Kučmová (CZE)				1				3	1		1	4
5	Sakura Hosogi (JPN)				1				2	2		2	3
5	Malaika Rapolu (USA)					1				2	2	3	2
5	Mariia Tkacheva					1				1	3	2	3
5	Cho I-hsuan (TPE)						2		1		2	0	5
5	Cho Yi-tsen (TPE)						2		1		2	0	5
5	Briana Szabo (ROU)						2		1		2	0	5
5	Lucciana Pérez Alarcón (PER)						1	1		1	2	2	3
5	Kanako Morisaki (JPN)						1		3		1	0	5
5	Xiao Zhenghua (CHN)						1		2		2	0	5
5	Joanna Garland (TPE)							4		1		5	0
5	Kaitlin Quevedo (ESP)							1	1	3		4	1
5	Jenny Dürst (SUI)								3		2	0	5
5	Kamilla Bartone (LAT)								2	1	2	1	4
5	Zuzanna Pawlikowska (POL)								1	2	2	2	3
5	Denisa Hindová (CZE)								1	1	3	1	4
5	Anja Stanković (SRB)								1	1	3	1	4
5	Joy de Zeeuw (NED)									2	3	2	3
5	Rada Zolotareva									1	4	1	4
5	Laura Böhner (GER)										5	0	5
5	Camila Romero (ECU)										5	0	5
4	Alexandra Eala (PHI)	1	1		1		1					1	3
4	Lulu Sun (NZL)	1	1			1	1					2	2
4	Aoi Ito (JPN)	1				1	1			1		3	1
4	Tang Qianhui (CHN)		2		2							0	4
4	Anastasia Tikhonova		2		2							0	4
4	Zheng Wushuang (CHN)		2			1			1			1	3
4	Laura Pigossi (BRA)		1	1	1	1						2	2
4	Sophie Chang (USA)		1	1	2							1	3
4	Francisca Jorge (POR)		1	1	1		1					1	3
4	Whitney Osuigwe (USA)		1		1	1			1			1	3
4	Destanee Aiava (AUS)		1			1	1	1				2	2
4	Clervie Ngounoue (USA)		1			1		2				3	1
4	Ayano Shimizu (JPN)		1				1	1	1			1	3
4	Momoko Kobori (JPN)		1				1	1			1	1	3
4	Anna Bondár (HUN)			3	1							3	1
4	Maja Chwalińska (POL)			2	2							2	2
4	Talia Gibson (AUS)			2	1			1				3	1
4	Lola Radivojević (SRB)			2	1			1				3	1
4	Carson Branstine (CAN)			1				2	1			3	1
4	Emily Appleton (GBR)				4							0	4
4	Isabelle Haverlag (NED)				4							0	4
4	Madeleine Brooks (GBR)				3		1					0	4
4	Jamie Loeb (USA)				2	1			1			1	3
4	Lena Papadakis (GER)				2		2					0	4
4	Paige Hourigan (NZL)				2		1		1			0	4
4	Alevtina Ibragimova				2			1	1			1	3
4	Valentini Grammatikopoulou (GRE)				2				2			0	4
4	Julie Štruplová (CZE)				1		1	1	1			1	3
4	Živa Falkner (SLO)				1		1		1	1		1	3
4	Ariana Arseneault (CAN)				1				3			0	4
4	Ekaterina Ovcharenko				1						3	0	4
4	Viktória Hrunčáková (SVK)					1	1	2				3	1
4	Tyra Caterina Grant (USA)					1	1			1	1	2	2
4	Hina Inoue (USA)					1		1		2		4	0
4	Evialina Laskevich					1			1	1	1	2	2
4	Guo Meiqi (CHN)						1		2		1	0	4
4	Naïma Karamoko (SUI)						1		1		2	0	4
4	Lee Ya-hsin (TPE)						1		1		2	0	4
4	Saki Imamura (JPN)						1			2	1	2	2
4	Alexandra Shubladze						1			2	1	2	2
4	Aglaya Fedorova						1				3	0	4
4	Lucija Ćirić Bagarić (CRO)							4				4	0
4	Alice Tubello (FRA)							3		1		4	0
4	Cristina Dinu (ROU)							2	2			2	2
4	Ángela Fita Boluda (ESP)							1	3			1	3
4	Katharina Hobgarski (GER)							1	2		1	1	3
4	Patcharin Cheapchandej (THA)							1		2	1	3	1
4	María Portillo Ramírez (MEX)								4			0	4
4	Miriana Tona (ITA)								4			0	4
4	Oana Gavrilă (ROU)								3	1		1	3
4	Daniela Vismane (LAT)								3	1		1	3
4	Jaeda Daniel (USA)								3		1	0	4
4	Ekaterina Shalimova								3		1	0	4
4	Eryn Cayetano (USA)								2	1	1	1	3
4	Fabienne Gettwart (GER)								1	3		3	1
4	Jeong Bo-young (KOR)								1	1	2	1	3
4	Arina Gabriela Vasilescu (ROU)								1	1	2	1	3
4	Marian Gómez Pezuela Cano (MEX)								1		3	0	4
4	Anri Nagata (JPN)								1		3	0	4
4	Ariana Geerlings (ESP)									4		4	0
4	Lee Eun-hye (KOR)									2	2	2	2
4	Matilde Mariani (ITA)									1	3	1	3
4	Luisa Meyer auf der Heide (GER)									1	3	1	3
4	Ruth Roura Llaverias (ESP)									1	3	1	3
4	Linda Ševčíková (CZE)									1	3	1	3
4	Julia Adams (USA)										4	0	4
4	Ekaterina Agureeva										4	0	4
4	Karola Bejenaru (ROU)										4	0	4
4	Nanari Katsumi (JPN)										4	0	4
3	Rebecca Marino (CAN)	2		1								3	0
3	Anastasia Zakharova	2				1						3	0
3	Jodie Burrage (GBR)	1	1		1							1	2
3	Julia Riera (ARG)	1		1			1					2	1
3	Estelle Cascino (FRA)		1		2							0	3
3	Alina Charaeva		1			1	1					1	2
3	Ekaterina Reyngold		1				1		1			0	3
3	Anna Sisková (CZE)		1				1			1		1	2
3	Elena Pridankina			1	2							1	2
3	Wei Sijia (CHN)			1		1		1				3	0
3	Susan Bandecchi (SUI)			1				2				3	0
3	Loïs Boisson (FRA)			1				2				3	0
3	Tena Lukas (CRO)			1				1	1			2	1
3	Freya Christie (GBR)				2		1					0	3
3	Prarthana Thombare (IND)				2		1					0	3
3	Rasheeda McAdoo (USA)				2				1			0	3
3	Lina Glushko (ISR)				1	1	1					1	2
3	Gabriela Knutson (CZE)				1	1	1					1	2
3	Dalayna Hewitt (USA)				1		2					0	3
3	Rutuja Bhosale (IND)				1		1		1			0	3
3	Émeline Dartron (FRA)				1			1			1	1	2
3	Misaki Matsuda (JPN)				1				2			0	3
3	Eri Shimizu (JPN)				1				2			0	3
3	Anita Wagner (BIH)				1				2			0	3
3	Michaela Bayerlová (CZE)				1						2	0	3
3	Aneta Laboutková (CZE)				1						2	0	3
3	Antonia Ružić (CRO)					3						3	0
3	Berfu Cengiz (TUR)					2		1				3	0
3	Kristina Dmitruk					2		1				3	0
3	Gao Xinyu (CHN)					2		1				3	0
3	Shi Han (CHN)					2		1				3	0
3	Darja Semeņistaja (LAT)					1	2					1	2
3	Hanna Chang (USA)					1	1	1				2	1
3	Anastasiia Gureva					1	1		1			1	2
3	Catherine Harrison (USA)					1	1			1		2	1
3	Sinja Kraus (AUT)					1		2				3	0
3	Giorgia Pedone (ITA)					1		2				3	0
3	Hanne Vandewinkel (BEL)					1		2				3	0
3	Linda Klimovičová (CZE)					1		1	1			2	1
3	Sada Nahimana (BDI)					1			2			1	2
3	Priska Madelyn Nugroho (INA)					1				2		3	0
3	Ekaterine Gorgodze (GEO)						2		1			0	3
3	Emma Léné (FRA)						1	1	1			1	2
3	Ekaterina Makarova						1	1	1			1	2
3	Valentina Ryser (SUI)						1	1	1			1	2
3	Elysia Bolton (AUS)						1		2			0	3
3	Alana Parnaby (AUS)						1		2			0	3
3	Jessica Failla (USA)						1		1	1		1	2
3	Ksenia Zaytseva						1		1	1		1	2
3	Inès Ibbou (ALG)						1		1		1	0	3
3	Makenna Jones (USA)						1		1		1	0	3
3	Carlota Martínez Círez (ESP)							3				3	0
3	Kajsa Rinaldo Persson (SWE)							3				3	0
3	Dalila Jakupović (SLO)							2	1			2	1
3	Andrea Lázaro García (ESP)							2		1		3	0
3	Robin Anderson (USA)							1	2			1	2
3	Fiona Crawley (USA)							1	1	1		2	1
3	Georgia Crăciun (ROU)							1		2		3	0
3	Malene Helgø (NOR)							1		2		3	0
3	Gina Feistel (POL)							1		1	1	2	1
3	Rina Saigo (JPN)							1		1	1	2	1
3	Jasmijn Gimbrère (NED)								3			0	3
3	Erika Sema (JPN)								3			0	3
3	Ikumi Yamazaki (JPN)								3			0	3
3	Noelia Zeballos (BOL)								3			0	3
3	Rinon Okuwaki (JPN)								2		1	0	3
3	Aya El Aouni (MAR)								1	2		2	1
3	Pia Lovrič (SLO)								1	2		2	1
3	Shiho Akita (JPN)								1	1	1	1	2
3	Ilinca Amariei (ROU)								1	1	1	1	2
3	Ana Candiotto (BRA)								1	1	1	1	2
3	Verena Meliss (ITA)								1	1	1	1	2
3	Salma Drugdová (SVK)								1		2	0	3
3	India Houghton (USA)								1		2	0	3
3	Michika Ozeki (JPN)								1		2	0	3
3	Joëlle Steur (GER)								1		2	0	3
3	Cristina Díaz Adrover (ESP)									3		3	0
3	Denislava Glushkova (BUL)									3		3	0
3	Caijsa Hennemann (SWE)									3		3	0
3	Laura Samson (CZE)									3		3	0
3	Daria Egorova									2	1	2	1
3	Dimitra Pavlou (GRE)									2	1	2	1
3	Lavinia Tănăsie (ROU)									2	1	2	1
3	İlay Yörük (TUR)									2	1	2	1
3	Victoria Bosio (ARG)									1	2	1	2
3	Jacqueline Cabaj Awad (SWE)									1	2	1	2
3	Loes Ebeling Koning (NED)									1	2	1	2
3	Alisa Kummel									1	2	1	2
3	Sandra Samir (EGY)									1	2	1	2
3	Carolyn Campana (USA)										3	0	3
3	Mara Gae (ROU)										3	0	3
3	Andrė Lukošiūtė (LTU)										3	0	3
3	Mia Mack (GER)										3	0	3
3	Victoria Mikhaylova										3	0	3
3	Luciana Moyano (ARG)										3	0	3
3	Haine Ogata (JPN)										3	0	3
3	Anastasiia Poplavska (UKR)										3	0	3
3	Anita Sahdiieva (UKR)										3	0	3
3	Vivien Sandberg (GER)										3	0	3
3	Beatrice Stagno (ITA)										3	0	3
3	Laura Svatíková (SVK)										3	0	3
3	Isis Louise van den Broek (NED)										3	0	3
3	Draginja Vuković (SRB)										3	0	3
2	Nuria Párrizas Díaz (ESP)	2										2	0
2	Jana Fett (CRO)	1		1								2	0
2	McCartney Kessler (USA)	1		1								2	0
2	Renata Zarazúa (MEX)	1		1								2	0
2	Tatiana Prozorova	1						1				2	0
2	Alison Van Uytvanck (BEL)	1						1				2	0
2	Fanny Stollár (HUN)		2									0	2
2	Emina Bektas (USA)		1	1								1	1
2	Kimberly Birrell (AUS)		1	1								1	1
2	Anastasia Dețiuc (CZE)		1		1							0	2
2	Tamara Zidanšek (SLO)		1		1							0	2
2	Liang En-shuo (TPE)		1				1					0	2
2	Samantha Murray Sharan (GBR)		1				1					0	2
2	Amelia Rajecki (GBR)		1				1					0	2
2	Sayaka Ishii (JPN)		1					1				1	1
2	Irina Bara (ROU)		1						1			0	2
2	Kristina Mladenovic (FRA)		1						1			0	2
2	Louisa Chirico (USA)			2								2	0
2	Yuriko Miyazaki (GBR)			2								2	0
2	Petra Marčinko (CRO)			1	1							1	1
2	Noma Noha Akugue (GER)			1	1							1	1
2	Jéssica Bouzas Maneiro (ESP)			1		1						2	0
2	Aliona Falei			1		1						2	0
2	Priscilla Hon (AUS)			1		1						2	0
2	Léolia Jeanjean (FRA)			1		1						2	0
2	Anouk Koevermans (NED)			1		1						2	0
2	Raluca Șerban (CYP)			1			1					1	1
2	Tessah Andrianjafitrimo (FRA)			1				1				2	0
2	Julia Avdeeva			1				1				2	0
2	Maya Joint (AUS)			1				1				2	0
2	Iva Jovic (USA)			1				1				2	0
2	Ella Seidel (GER)			1				1				2	0
2	Amina Anshba				2							0	2
2	Jesika Malečková (CZE)				2							0	2
2	Arianne Hartono (NED)				1		1					0	2
2	Yuliana Lizarazo (COL)				1			1				1	1
2	Alexandra Bozovic (AUS)				1				1			0	2
2	Lizette Cabrera (AUS)				1				1			0	2
2	Mariana Dražić (CRO)				1				1			0	2
2	Angela Kulikov (USA)				1				1			0	2
2	Mia Kupres (CAN)				1				1			0	2
2	Despina Papamichail (GRE)				1				1			0	2
2	Lian Tran (NED)				1				1			0	2
2	Daria Snigur (UKR)					2						2	0
2	Polina Kudermetova					1	1					1	1
2	Barbora Palicová (CZE)					1		1				2	0
2	Lanlana Tararudee (THA)					1		1				2	0
2	Lesley Pattinama Kerkhove (NED)						2					0	2
2	Camilla Rosatello (ITA)						2					0	2
2	Valeriya Strakhova (UKR)						2					0	2
2	Katrina Scott (USA)						1	1				1	1
2	Silvia Ambrosio (ITA)						1		1			0	2
2	Naiktha Bains (GBR)						1		1			0	2
2	Ankita Raina (IND)						1		1			0	2
2	Tsao Chia-yi (TPE)						1		1			0	2
2	Carolina Alves (BRA)						1			1		1	1
2	Lin Fang-an (TPE)						1				1	0	2
2	Ayla Aksu (TUR)							2				2	0
2	Nuria Brancaccio (ITA)							2				2	0
2	Sara Cakarevic (FRA)							2				2	0
2	Victoria Hu (USA)							2				2	0
2	Oleksandra Oliynykova (UKR)							2				2	0
2	Anastasiya Soboleva (UKR)							2				2	0
2	Shrivalli Bhamidipaty (IND)							1	1			1	1
2	Vaidehi Chaudhari (IND)							1	1			1	1
2	Yuliya Hatouka							1	1			1	1
2	Liv Hovde (USA)							1	1			1	1
2	Fanny Östlund (SWE)							1	1			1	1
2	Tamira Paszek (AUT)							1	1			1	1
2	Peangtarn Plipuech (THA)							1	1			1	1
2	Luiza Fullana (BRA)							1		1		2	0
2	Olivia Lincer (POL)							1		1		2	0
2	Karina Miller (USA)							1		1		2	0
2	Julie Belgraver (FRA)							1			1	1	1
2	Nina Stojanović (SRB)							1			1	1	1
2	Anastasia Zolotareva							1			1	1	1
2	Anastasia Abbagnato (ITA)								2			0	2
2	Carmen Corley (USA)								2			0	2
2	Ivana Corley (USA)								2			0	2
2	Ylena In-Albon (SUI)								2			0	2
2	Lia Karatantcheva (BUL)								2			0	2
2	Mana Kawamura (JPN)								2			0	2
2	Ema Kovacevic (BEL)								2			0	2
2	Karolína Kubáňová (CZE)								2			0	2
2	Sofya Lansere								2			0	2
2	Elena Malõgina (EST)								2			0	2
2	Yuki Naito (JPN)								2			0	2
2	Ekaterina Kazionova								1	1		1	1
2	Maegan Manasse (USA)								1	1		1	1
2	Akiko Omae (JPN)								1	1		1	1
2	Andreea Prisăcariu (ROU)								1	1		1	1
2	Antonia Schmidt (GER)								1	1		1	1
2	Natsuho Arakawa (JPN)								1		1	0	2
2	Julia García (MEX)								1		1	0	2
2	Anastasiia Grechkina								1		1	0	2
2	Daria Khomutsianskaya								1		1	0	2
2	Elena Korokozidi (GRE)								1		1	0	2
2	Funa Kozaki (JPN)								1		1	0	2
2	Michaëlla Krajicek (NED)								1		1	0	2
2	Tiphanie Lemaître (FRA)								1		1	0	2
2	Tayisiya Morderger (GER)								1		1	0	2
2	Yana Morderger (GER)								1		1	0	2
3	Adrienn Nagy (HUN)								1		2	0	3
2	Alicia Smith (AUS)								1		1	0	2
2	Anastasia Sukhotina								1		1	0	2
2	Ana Carmen Zamburek (DOM)								1		1	0	2
2	Arina Bulatova									2		2	0
2	Gabriela Cé (BRA)									2		2	0
2	Celia Cerviño Ruiz (ESP)									2		2	0
2	Ksenia Efremova (FRA)									2		2	0
2	Renáta Jamrichová (SVK)									2		2	0
2	Karolina Kozakova (SUI)									2		2	0
2	Jenny Lim (FRA)									2		2	0
2	Veronika Podrez (UKR)									2		2	0
2	Eliessa Vanglangendonck (BEL)									2		2	0
2	Candela Vázquez (ARG)									2		2	0
2	Sonja Zhiyenbayeva (KAZ)									2		2	0
2	Vaishnavi Adkar (IND)									1	1	1	1
2	Lamis Alhussein Abdel Aziz (EGY)									1	1	1	1
2	Gabriella Broadfoot (RSA)									1	1	1	1
2	Savannah Broadus (USA)									1	1	1	1
2	Klaudija Bubelytė (LTU)									1	1	1	1
2	Sara Daavettila (USA)									1	1	1	1
2	Maria Golovina									1	1	1	1
2	Mara Guth (GER)									1	1	1	1
2	Sina Herrmann (GER)									1	1	1	1
2	Rebecca Munk Mortensen (DEN)									1	1	1	1
2	Mio Mushika (JPN)									1	1	1	1
2	Lucie Nguyen Tan (FRA)									1	1	1	1
2	Nina Radovanovic (FRA)									1	1	1	1
2	Sofía Camila Rojas (USA)									1	1	1	1
2	Arlinda Rushiti (KOS)									1	1	1	1
2	Chantal Sauvant (GER)									1	1	1	1
2	Oana Georgeta Simion (ROU)									1	1	1	1
2	Amelie Van Impe (BEL)									1	1	1	1
2	Emily Welker (GER)									1	1	1	1
2	Valeriya Yushchenko									1	1	1	1
2	Annelin Bakker (NED)										2	0	2
2	Monique Barry (NZL)										2	0	2
2	Leena Bennetto (CAN)										2	0	2
2	Camilla Bossi (BRA)										2	0	2
2	Enola Chiesa (ITA)										2	0	2
2	Kaat Coppez (BEL)										2	0	2
2	Marcella Cruz (USA)										2	0	2
2	Josy Daems (GER)										2	0	2
2	Tilwith Di Girolami (BEL)										2	0	2
2	Yasmin Ezzat (EGY)										2	0	2
2	Sofya Gapankova										2	0	2
2	María Herazo González (COL)										2	0	2
2	Pooja Ingale (IND)										2	0	2
2	Alena Kovačková (CZE)										2	0	2
2	Punnin Kovapitukted (THA)										2	0	2
2	Fernanda Labraña (CHI)										2	0	2
2	Sabastiani León (USA)										2	0	2
2	Eliz Maloney (GBR)										2	0	2
2	Kateřina Mandelíková (CZE)										2	0	2
2	Marie Mettraux (SUI)										2	0	2
2	Vittoria Modesti (ITA)										2	0	2
2	Mao Mushika (JPN)										2	0	2
2	Rose Marie Nijkamp (NED)										2	0	2
2	Tea Nikčević (MNE)										2	0	2
2	Angella Okutoyi (KEN)										2	0	2
2	Anastasia Safta (ROU)										2	0	2
2	Ivana Šebestová (CZE)										2	0	2
2	Natalia Siedliska (GER)										2	0	2
2	Vicky Van de Peer (BEL)										2	0	2
2	Kseniya Yersh										2	0	2
1	Anna Blinkova	1										1	0
1	Olga Danilović (SRB)	1										1	0
1	Alina Korneeva	1										1	0
1	Sara Saito (JPN)	1										1	0
1	Hailey Baptiste (USA)		1									0	1
1	Jang Su-jeong (KOR)		1									0	1
1	Katarzyna Kawa (POL)		1									0	1
1	Miriam Kolodziejová (CZE)		1									0	1
1	Aleksandra Krunić (SRB)		1									0	1
1	Andreea Mitu (ROU)		1									0	1
1	Alexandra Osborne (AUS)		1									0	1
1	Katarzyna Piter (POL)		1									0	1
1	Elena-Gabriela Ruse (ROU)		1									0	1
1	Mona Barthel (GER)			1								1	0
1	Sára Bejlek (CZE)			1								1	0
1	María Lourdes Carlé (ARG)			1								1	0
1	Victoria Jiménez Kasintseva (AND)			1								1	0
1	Emerson Jones (AUS)			1								1	0
1	Francesca Jones (GBR)			1								1	0
1	Suzan Lamens (NED)			1								1	0
1	Claire Liu (USA)			1								1	0
1	Tatjana Maria (GER)			1								1	0
1	Maria Mateas (USA)			1								1	0
1	Mia Pohánková (SVK)			1								1	0
1	Leyre Romero Gormaz (ESP)			1								1	0
1	Arantxa Rus (NED)			1								1	0
1	Daria Saville (AUS)			1								1	0
1	Oksana Selekhmeteva			1								1	0
1	Mary Stoiana (USA)			1								1	0
1	Akasha Urhobo (USA)			1								1	0
1	Simona Waltert (SUI)			1								1	0
1	Wang Meiling (CHN)			1								1	0
1	Tara Würth (CRO)			1								1	0
1	Katarina Zavatska (UKR)			1								1	0
1	Kayla Day (USA)				1							0	1
1	Anna-Lena Friedsam (GER)				1							0	1
1	Quinn Gleason (USA)				1							0	1
1	Olivia Nicholls (GBR)				1							0	1
1	Conny Perrin (SUI)				1							0	1
1	Taylah Preston (AUS)				1							0	1
1	Christina Rosca (USA)				1							0	1
1	Erin Routliffe (NZL)				1							0	1
1	Sofia Shapatava (GEO)				1							0	1
1	Vasanti Shinde (IND)				1							0	1
1	Iryna Shymanovich				1							0	1
1	Eden Silva (GBR)				1							0	1
1	You Xiaodi (CHN)				1							0	1
1	Allura Zamarripa (USA)				1							0	1
1	Lucía Cortez Llorca (ESP)					1						1	0
1	Zarina Diyas (KAZ)					1						1	0
1	Daria Kudashova					1						1	0
1	Guiomar Maristany (ESP)					1						1	0
1	Caty McNally (USA)					1						1	0
1	Mananchaya Sawangkaew (THA)					1						1	0
1	Rebecca Šramková (SVK)					1						1	0
1	Lucrezia Stefanini (ITA)					1						1	0
1	Harmony Tan (FRA)					1						1	0
1	Wang Qiang (CHN)					1						1	0
1	Heather Watson (GBR)					1						1	0
1	Usue Maitane Arconada (USA)						1					0	1
1	Diae El Jardi (MAR)						1					0	1
1	Feng Shuo (CHN)						1					0	1
1	Thaísa Grana Pedretti (BRA)						1					0	1
1	Erina Hayashi (JPN)						1					0	1
1	Sarah Iliev (FRA)						1					0	1
1	Li Yu-yun (TPE)						1					0	1
1	Marina Melnikova						1					0	1
1	Elena Micic (AUS)						1					0	1
1	Kira Pavlova						1					0	1
1	Urszula Radwańska (POL)						1					0	1
1	Anca Todoni (ROU)						1					0	1
1	Ye Qiuyu (CHN)						1					0	1
1	Audrey Albié (FRA)							1				1	0
1	Amarni Banks (GBR)							1				1	0
1	Mariam Bolkvadze (GEO)							1				1	0
1	Cadence Brace (CAN)							1				1	0
1	Irene Burillo Escorihuela (ESP)							1				1	0
1	Gabriella Da Silva-Fick (AUS)							1				1	0
1	Melisa Ercan (AUS)							1				1	0
1	Stacey Fung (CAN)							1				1	0
1	Julia Grabher (AUT)							1				1	0
1	Guo Hanyu (CHN)							1				1	0
1	Amandine Hesse (FRA)							1				1	0
1	Amelia Honer (USA)							1				1	0
1	Zoë Kruger (RSA)							1				1	0
1	Manon Léonard (FRA)							1				1	0
1	Li Zongyu (CHN)							1				1	0
1	Daria Lodikova							1				1	0
1	Anastasiya Lopata (UKR)							1				1	0
1	Lea Ma (USA)							1				1	0
1	Victoria Mboko (CAN)							1				1	0
1	Matilde Paoletti (ITA)							1				1	0
1	Tatiana Pieri (ITA)							1				1	0
1	Maria Sara Popa (ROU)							1				1	0
1	Margaux Rouvroy (FRA)							1				1	0
1	Himeno Sakatsume (JPN)							1				1	0
1	Lara Schmidt (GER)							1				1	0
1	Ena Shibahara (JPN)							1				1	0
1	Madison Sieg (USA)							1				1	0
1	Monika Stankiewicz (POL)							1				1	0
1	Mika Stojsavljevic (GBR)							1				1	0
1	Natália Szabanin (HUN)							1				1	0
1	Jil Teichmann (SUI)							1				1	0
1	Mei Yamaguchi (JPN)							1				1	0
1	Nigina Abduraimova (UZB)								1			0	1
1	Ayana Akli (USA)								1			0	1
1	Linea Bajraliu (SWE)								1			0	1
1	Isabella Barrere Aguirre (USA)								1			0	1
1	Bella Bergkvist Larsson (SWE)								1			0	1
1	Aliona Bolsova (ESP)								1			0	1
1	Martina Colmegna (ITA)								1			0	1
1	Francesca Curmi (MLT)								1			0	1
1	Malak El Allami (MAR)								1			0	1
1	Andrea Gámiz (VEN)								1			0	1
1	Dana Guzmán (PER)								1			0	1
1	Polina Iatcenko								1			0	1
1	Elvina Kalieva (USA)								1			0	1
1	Tahlia Kokkinis (AUS)								1			0	1
1	Tamara Kostic (AUT)								1			0	1
1	Miho Kuramochi (JPN)								1			0	1
1	Hiroko Kuwata (JPN)								1			0	1
1	Ashley Lahey (USA)								1			0	1
1	Liu Fangzhou (CHN)								1			0	1
1	Diāna Marcinkēviča (LAT)								1			0	1
1	Marie Mattel (FRA)								1			0	1
1	Thasaporn Naklo (THA)								1			0	1
1	Olga Parres Azcoitia (ESP)								1			0	1
1	Alice Ramé (FRA)								1			0	1
1	Abigail Rencheli (USA)								1			0	1
1	Sofia Rocchetti (ITA)								1			0	1
1	Ana Sofía Sánchez (MEX)								1			0	1
1	Bunyawi Thamchaiwat (THA)								1			0	1
1	Tian Fangran (CHN)								1			0	1
1	Renata Voráčová (CZE)								1			0	1
1	Kisa Yoshioka (JPN)								1			0	1
1	Anna Zyryanova								1			0	1
1	Yaroslava Bartashevich (FRA)									1		1	0
1	Clarissa Blomqvist (FIN)									1		1	0
1	Nikola Břečková (CZE)									1		1	0
1	Elena-Teodora Cadar (ROU)									1		1	0
1	Emma Charney (USA)									1		1	0
1	Samira De Stefano (ITA)									1		1	0
1	Rachel Gailis (USA)									1		1	0
1	Jimar Gerald Gonzalez (CHI)									1		1	0
1	Alice Gillan (GBR)									1		1	0
1	Alina Granwehr (SUI)									1		1	0
1	Alanis Hamilton (USA)									1		1	0
1	Carmen Andreea Herea (ROU)									1		1	0
1	Mina Hodzic (GER)									1		1	0
1	Yasmine Kabbaj (MAR)									1		1	0
1	Zoziya Kardava (GEO)									1		1	0
1	Tanisha Kashyap (IND)									1		1	0
1	Ekaterina Khayrutdinova									1		1	0
1	Arabella Koller (AUT)									1		1	0
1	Kristina Kroitor									1		1	0
1	Isabella Kruger (RSA)									1		1	0
1	Mathilde Lollia (FRA)									1		1	0
1	Edda Mamedova									1		1	0
1	Kaylah McPhee (AUS)									1		1	0
1	Ezster Méri (SVK)									1		1	0
1	Victoria Milovanova									1		1	0
1	Elina Nepliy									1		1	0
1	Kayo Nishimura (JPN)									1		1	0
1	Alisa Oktiabreva									1		1	0
1	Julieta Pareja (USA)									1		1	0
1	Patricija Paukštytė (LTU)									1		1	0
1	Beatrice Ricci (ITA)									1		1	0
1	Amélie Šmejkalová (CZE)									1		1	0
1	Duru Söke (TUR)									1		1	0
1	Wu Ho-ching (HKG)									1		1	0
1	Sahaja Yamalapalli (IND)									1		1	0
1	Yang Yidi (CHN)									1		1	0
1	Ekaterina Yashina									1		1	0
1	Daria Yesypchuk (UKR)									1		1	0
1	Camilla Zanolini (ITA)									1		1	0
1	Arianna Zucchini (ITA)									1		1	0
1	Esther Adeshina (GBR)										1	0	1
1	Mayuka Aikawa (JPN)										1	0	1
1	Vladislava Andreevskaya (KGZ)										1	0	1
1	Maria Andrienko										1	0	1
1	Carolyn Ansari (USA)										1	0	1
1	Arina Arifullina										1	0	1
1	Asylzhan Arystanbekova (KAZ)										1	0	1
1	Mariam Atia (EGY)										1	0	1
1	Mana Ayukawa (JPN)										1	0	1
1	Humera Baharmus (IND)										1	0	1
1	Anastasia Bertacchi (ITA)										1	0	1
1	Elena Ruxandra Bertea (ROU)										1	0	1
1	Riya Bhatia (IND)										1	0	1
1	Sara Borkop (DEN)										1	0	1
1	Ashton Bowers (USA)										1	0	1
1	Carly Briggs (USA)										1	0	1
1	Marina Bulbarella (ARG)										1	0	1
1	Evgeniya Burdina										1	0	1
1	Ema Burgić (USA)										1	0	1
1	Anna Campana (USA)										1	0	1
1	Romina Ccuno (PER)										1	0	1
1	Choi Ji-hee (KOR)										1	0	1
1	Laura Cíleková (SVK)										1	0	1
1	Defne Çırpanlı (TUR)										1	0	1
1	Paris Corley (USA)										1	0	1
1	Anastasija Cvetković (SRB)										1	0	1
1	Selina Dal (GER)										1	0	1
1	Francesca Dell'Edera (ITA)										1	0	1
1	Deniz Dilek (TUR)										1	0	1
1	Gina Marie Dittmann (GER)										1	0	1
1	Felitsata Dorofeeva-Rybas										1	0	1
1	Başak Eraydın (TUR)										1	0	1
1	Dia Evtimova (BUL)										1	0	1
1	Weronika Ewald (POL)										1	0	1
1	Anastasiia Firman (UKR)										1	0	1
1	Martina Genis Salas (ESP)										1	0	1
1	Justina González Daniele (ARG)										1	0	1
1	Madelief Hageman (NED)										1	0	1
1	Anna Hertel (POL)										1	0	1
1	Merel Hoedt (NED)										1	0	1
1	Luisa Hrda (GER)										1	0	1
1	Akari Inoue (JPN)										1	0	1
1	Valentina Ivanov (NZL)										1	0	1
1	Dasha Ivanova (USA)										1	0	1
1	Iva Ivanova (BUL)										1	0	1
1	Jang Ga-eul (KOR)										1	0	1
1	Madeline Jessup (TPE)										1	0	1
1	Ida Johansson (SWE)										1	0	1
1	Lauryn John-Baptiste (GBR)										1	0	1
1	Katarina Jokić (SRB)										1	0	1
1	Mayra Jovic (ARG)										1	0	1
1	Kathleen Kanev (GER)										1	0	1
1	Nana Kawagishi (JPN)										1	0	1
1	Natsumi Kawaguchi (JPN)										1	0	1
1	Kelly Keller (USA)										1	0	1
1	Sandugash Kenzhibayeva (KAZ)										1	0	1
1	Kim Da-bin (KOR)										1	0	1
1	Kim Na-ri (KOR)										1	0	1
1	Kim Yu-jin (KOR)										1	0	1
1	Hayu Kinoshita (JPN)										1	0	1
1	Anet Angelika Koskel (EST)										1	0	1
1	Natália Kročková (SVK)										1	0	1
1	Louise Kwong (CAN)										1	0	1
1	Raphaëlle Lacasse (CAN)										1	0	1
1	Polina Leykina										1	0	1
1	Astrid Lew Yan Foon (FRA)										1	0	1
1	Romane Longueville (BEL)										1	0	1
1	Valentina Losciale (ITA)										1	0	1
1	Lavinia Luciano (ITA)										1	0	1
1	Savanna Lý-Nguyễn (VIE)										1	0	1
1	Ekaterina Makarova										1	0	1
1	Bojana Marinković (SRB)										1	0	1
1	Tenika McGiffin (USA)										1	0	1
1	Alicia Melosch (GER)										1	0	1
1	Seone Mendez (AUS)										1	0	1
1	Cara Maria Meșter (ROU)										1	0	1
1	Talia Neilson Gatenby (GBR)										1	0	1
1	Chloé Noël (FRA)										1	0	1
1	Kristina Novak (SLO)										1	0	1
1	Jacquline Nylander Altelius (SWE)										1	0	1
1	Simona Ogescu (ROU)										1	0	1
1	Mavie Österreicher (AUT)										1	0	1
1	Francesca Pace (ITA)										1	0	1
1	Gaia Parravicini (ITA)										1	0	1
1	Julie Paštiková (CZE)										1	0	1
1	Rebeca Pereira (BRA)										1	0	1
1	Laïa Petretic (FRA)										1	0	1
1	Giorgia Pinto (ITA)										1	0	1
1	Marcelina Podlińska (POL)										1	0	1
1	Anna Linn Puls (GER)										1	0	1
1	Merna Refaat (EGY)										1	0	1
1	Alice Robbe (FRA)										1	0	1
1	Julia Ronney (USA)										1	0	1
1	Federica Sacco (ITA)										1	0	1
1	Zdena Šafářová (CZE)										1	0	1
1	Yukina Saigo (JPN)										1	0	1
1	Ana Filipa Santos (POR)										1	0	1
1	Ioana Teodora Sava (ROU)										1	0	1
1	Sebastianna Scilipoti (SUI)										1	0	1
1	Isabella Maria Serban (ITA)										1	0	1
1	Daria Shadchneva										1	0	1
1	Kristiana Sidorova										1	0	1
1	Mia Slama (USA)										1	0	1
1	Emma Slavíková (CZE)										1	0	1
1	Julia Stamatova (BUL)										1	0	1
1	Tess Sugnaux (SUI)										1	0	1
1	Johanne Svendsen (DEN)										1	0	1
1	Lilli Tagger (AUT)										1	0	1
1	Julia Terziyska (BUL)										1	0	1
1	Shiori Tominaga (JPN)										1	0	1
1	Katerina Tsygourova (SUI)										1	0	1
1	Viola Turini (ITA)										1	0	1
1	Doğa Türkmen (TUR)										1	0	1
1	Anna Ulyashchenko (USA)										1	0	1
1	Anna Ureke										1	0	1
1	Federica Urgesi (ITA)										1	0	1
1	Dune Vaissaud (FRA)										1	0	1
1	Liisa Varul (EST)										1	0	1
1	Antonia Vergara Rivera (CHI)										1	0	1
1	Marie Villet (FRA)										1	0	1
1	Karolína Vlčková (CZE)										1	0	1
1	Marie Vogt (GER)										1	0	1
1	Ingrid Vojčináková (SVK)										1	0	1
1	Stefani Webb (AUS)										1	0	1
1	Marie Weckerle (LUX)										1	0	1
1	Anja Wildgruber (GER)										1	0	1
1	Angelina Wirges (GER)										1	0	1
1	Xu Jiayu (CHN)										1	0	1
1	Xun Fangying (CHN)										1	0	1
1	Hikaru Yoshikawa (JPN)										1	0	1
1	Milana Zhabrailova										1	0	1
1	Zhang Ying (CHN)										1	0	1

=== Titles won by nation ===
Updated as of 30 December

Total	Nation	W100		W75		W50		W35		W15		Total	
Total	Nation	S	D	S	D	S	D	S	D	S	D	S	D
137	United States (USA)	1	4	10	13	9	12	16	24	19	29	55	82
83	Japan (JPN)	5	2	1	2	2	5	8	23	13	22	29	54
69	Czech Republic (CZE)		2	5	9	4	5	5	7	13	19	27	42
59	Germany (GER)			4	4		2	3	6	10	30	17	42
58	France (FRA)		2	3	3	3	1	16	6	13	11	35	23
56	Romania (ROU)		2				3	6	10	15	20	21	35
51	Spain (ESP)	2	1	2	5	3	1	8	11	14	4	29	22
51	Italy (ITA)				3	2	5	7	11	6	17	15	36
50	Great Britain (GBR)	2	3	3	10	1	4	8	7	3	9	17	33
49	Netherlands (NED)		1	3	7	1	3		10	6	18	10	39
46	Slovakia (SVK)			1		2	1	4	11	13	14	20	26
43	Australia (AUS)	1	3	8	6	2	3	7	8	1	4	19	24
42	Argentina (ARG)	1		2	2	2	2	4	6	9	14	18	24
40	Poland (POL)		2	2	2		4	6	11	5	8	13	27
40	Switzerland (SUI)		1	3	5	1	3	7	9	3	8	14	26
32	China (CHN)		2	2	2	6	3	5	6	2	4	15	17
29	Belgium (BEL)	1				2	4	6	7	3	6	12	17
26	Greece (GRE)		1		3		1		13	3	5	3	23
23	Canada (CAN)	2		2	2			6	7		4	10	13
23	Slovenia (SLO)		1	1	4		2	3	8	3	1	7	16
23	Sweden (SWE)						1	4	5	5	8	9	14
21	Serbia (SRB)	1	1	2	1			2	1	4	9	9	12
20	Chinese Taipei (TPE)		1				6	4	3	1	5	5	15
20	Ukraine (UKR)			1		2	2	5		3	7	11	9
18	South Korea (KOR)		1					1	1	6	9	7	11
18	India (IND)				4		3	2	3	3	3	5	13
17	Croatia (CRO)	1		4	2	3		5	2			13	4
16	Brazil (BRA)		1	1	1	1	2	1	1	5	3	8	8
15	Hungary (HUN)		2	3	2		1	1	1	3	2	7	8
13	Mexico (MEX)	1		1					7		4	2	11
13	Turkey (TUR)					2		3		3	5	8	5
13	Latvia (LAT)					1	2		6	2	2	3	10
12	Kazakhstan (KAZ)				1	1	3		3	3	1	4	8
12	Indonesia (INA)					1		1		8	2	10	2
11	Lithuania (LTU)				2	1	1	1		2	4	4	7
11	Thailand (THA)					2		3	2	2	2	7	4
11	Hong Kong (HKG)					1	3	2	3	1	1	4	7
10	Austria (AUT)					1		4	2	1	2	6	4
9	Bulgaria (BUL)								2	3	4	3	6
9	Egypt (EGY)									2	7	2	7
8	New Zealand (NZL)	1	1		2		1		1		2	1	7
8	Portugal (POR)		1	1	1		2	1	1		1	2	6
8	Cyprus (CYP)			1			1		1	3	2	4	4
7	Peru (PER)						1	1	1	1	3	2	5
7	Finland (FIN)								5	2		2	5
6	Georgia (GEO)				1		2	1	1	1		2	4
6	Ireland (IRL)								1		5	0	6
5	Morocco (MAR)						1		1	3		3	2
5	Ecuador (ECU)										5	0	5
4	Philippines (PHI)	1	1		1		1					1	3
4	Colombia (COL)				1			1			2	1	3
4	South Africa (RSA)							1		2	1	3	1
4	Estonia (EST)								2		2	0	4
3	Israel (ISR)				1	1	1					1	2
3	Bosnia and Herzegovina (BIH)				1				2			0	3
3	Burundi (BDI)					1			2			1	2
3	Algeria (ALG)						1		1		1	0	3
3	Norway (NOR)							1		2		3	0
3	Bolivia (BOL)								3			0	3
3	Chile (CHI)									1	2	1	2
3	Denmark (DEN)									1	2	1	2
2	Dominican Republic (DOM)								1		1	0	2
2	Kosovo (KOS)									1	1	1	1
2	Kenya (KEN)										2	0	2
2	Montenegro (MNE)										2	0	2
1	Andorra (AND)			1								1	0
1	Malta (MLT)								1			0	1
1	Uzbekistan (UZB)								1			0	1
1	Venezuela (VEN)								1			0	1
1	Kyrgyzstan (KGZ)										1	0	1
1	Luxembourg (LUX)										1	0	1
1	Vietnam (VIE)										1	0	1

== See also ==
- 2024 WTA Tour
- 2024 WTA 125 tournaments
- 2024 ATP Challenger Tour
- 2024 ITF Men's World Tennis Tour
