= 2023 Amstelveen Women's Open =

Tennis tournament

- Date: 10–16 July 2023
- Edition: 3rd
- Category: ITF Women's World Tennis Tour
- Prize money: $60,000
- Surface: Clay / Outdoor
- Location: Amstelveen, Netherlands

Champions

Singles
- (Estonia) Kaia Kanepi

Doubles
- (Germany) Noma Noha Akugue / (Luxembourg) Marie Weckerle
← 2022 ·	Amstelveen Women's Open	· 2024 →

The 2023 Amstelveen Women's Open was a professional tennis tournament played on outdoor clay courts. It was the third edition of the tournament, which was part of the 2023 ITF Women's World Tennis Tour. It took place in Amstelveen, Netherlands, between 10 and 16 July 2023.

== Champions ==
=== Singles ===
- (Estonia) Kaia Kanepi def. (Serbia) Lola Radivojević, 6–2, 7–6^{(7–5)}

=== Doubles ===
- (Germany) Noma Noha Akugue / (Luxembourg) Marie Weckerle def. (Turkey) Ayla Aksu / (Croatia) Ena Kajević, 7–5, 6–3

== Singles main draw entrants ==
=== Seeds ===
Country	Player	Rank	Seed
EST	Kaia Kanepi	101	1
FRA	Océane Dodin	113	2
CZE	Brenda Fruhvirtová	138	3
SUI	Ylena In-Albon	160	4
~~AUT~~	~~Sinja Kraus~~	~~193~~	~~5~~
	Darya Astakhova	210	6
GER	Noma Noha Akugue	216	7
FRA	Alice Robbe	222	8

- Rankings are as of 3 July 2023.

=== Other entrants ===
The following players received wildcards into the singles main draw:

- (Netherlands) Jasmijn Gimbrère
- (Netherlands) Lexie Stevens
- (Netherlands) Isis Louise van den Broek
- (Netherlands) Sarah van Emst

The following player received entry into the singles main draw as a special exempt:

- (United States) Jessie Aney

The following players received entry from the qualifying draw:

- (Turkey) Ayla Aksu
- (Netherlands) Annelin Bakker
- (Japan) Nagi Hanatani
- (Netherlands) Anouk Koevermans
- (Greece) Michaela Laki
- (United States) Chiara Scholl
- (Netherlands) Lian Tran
- (Netherlands) Stéphanie Visscher

The following player received entry as a lucky loser:

- (Germany) Tayisiya Morderger
