= 2023 Amstelveen Women's Open – Doubles =

Doubles
- 2023 Amstelveen Women's Open

Final
- Champions: (Germany) Noma Noha Akugue (Luxembourg) Marie Weckerle
- Runners-up: (Turkey) Ayla Aksu (Croatia) Ena Kajević
- Score: 7–5, 6–3

Events
Singles	Doubles
← 2022 ·	Amstelveen Women's Open	· 2024 →

Aliona Bolsova and Guiomar Maristany were the defending champions but chose not to participate.

Noma Noha Akugue and Marie Weckerle won the title, defeating Ayla Aksu and Ena Kajević in the final, 7–5, 6–3.

== Seeds ==
1. (Netherlands) Jasmijn Gimbrère / (Netherlands) Isabelle Haverlag (quarterfinals)
2. Darya Astakhova / (Netherlands) Lexie Stevens (first round)
3. (Australia) Alana Parnaby / (France) Alice Robbe (quarterfinals)
4. (Czech Republic) Denisa Hindová / (Czech Republic) Karolína Kubáňová (first round)

== Draw ==
=== Key ===
- Q = Qualifier
- WC = Wild card
- LL = Lucky loser
- Alt = Alternate
- SE = Special exempt
- PR = Protected ranking
- ITF = ITF entry
- JE = Junior exempt
- w/o = Walkover
- r = Retired
- d = Defaulted
- SR = Special ranking

First round
1	(Netherlands) J Gimbrère (Netherlands) I Haverlag	6	6
(Netherlands) A Koevermans (Greece) M Laki	2	4
(Turkey) A Aksu (Croatia) E Kajević	6	6
(Hungary) A Nagy (Germany) L Papadakis	1	4
3	(Australia) A Parnaby (France) A Robbe	6	6
(Slovakia) V Morvayová (Czech Republic) A Sisková	3	4
(Germany) T Morderger (Germany) Y Morderger	0	2
WC	(Netherlands) I de Vroome (Bulgaria) I Shinikova	6	6
WC	(Netherlands) M Hoedt (Netherlands) S van Emst	6	6
(Japan) N Sato (Netherlands) S Visscher	2	4
(Germany) N Noha Akugue (Luxembourg) M Weckerle	6	6
4	(Czech Republic) D Hindová (Czech Republic) K Kubáňová	3	4
(Netherlands) D Tran (Netherlands) L Tran	7	6
WC	(Netherlands) A Bakker (Netherlands) IL van den Broek	5	2
(Belgium) T Di Girolami (United States) C Scholl	6	6
2	D Astakhova (Netherlands) L Stevens	1	2

Quarterfinals
1	(Netherlands) J Gimbrère (Netherlands) I Haverlag	6	5	[10]
(Turkey) A Aksu (Croatia) E Kajević	2	7	[12]
3	(Australia) A Parnaby (France) A Robbe	2	3
WC	(Netherlands) I de Vroome (Bulgaria) I Shinikova	6	6
WC	(Netherlands) M Hoedt (Netherlands) S van Emst
(Germany) N Noha Akugue (Luxembourg) M Weckerle	w/o
(Netherlands) D Tran (Netherlands) L Tran	4	4
(Belgium) T Di Girolami (United States) C Scholl	6	6

Semifinals
(Turkey) A Aksu (Croatia) E Kajević	6^{2}	6	[10]
WC	(Netherlands) I de Vroome (Bulgaria) I Shinikova	7^{7}	4	[7]
(Germany) N Noha Akugue (Luxembourg) M Weckerle	4	6	[11]
(Belgium) T Di Girolami (United States) C Scholl	6	4	[9]

Final
(Turkey) A Aksu (Croatia) E Kajević	5	3
(Germany) N Noha Akugue (Luxembourg) M Weckerle	7	6
