= 2023 Amstelveen Women's Open – Singles =

Singles
- 2023 Amstelveen Women's Open

Final
- Champion: (Estonia) Kaia Kanepi
- Runner-up: (Serbia) Lola Radivojević
- Score: 6–2, 7–6^{(7–5)}

Events
Singles	Doubles
← 2022 ·	Amstelveen Women's Open	· 2024 →

Simona Waltert was the defending champion but chose not to participate.

Kaia Kanepi won the title, defeating Lola Radivojević in the final, 6–2, 7–6^{(7–5)}.

== Seeds ==
1. (Estonia) Kaia Kanepi (champion)
2. (France) Océane Dodin (quarterfinals)
3. (Czech Republic) Brenda Fruhvirtová (semifinals)
4. (Switzerland) Ylena In-Albon (quarterfinals)
5. (Austria) Sinja Kraus (withdrew)
6. Darya Astakhova (second round)
7. (Germany) Noma Noha Akugue (semifinals)
8. (France) Alice Robbe (quarterfinals, retired)

== Draw ==
=== Key ===
- Q = Qualifier
- WC = Wild card
- LL = Lucky loser
- Alt = Alternate
- SE = Special exempt
- PR = Protected ranking
- ITF = ITF entry
- JE = Junior exempt
- w/o = Walkover
- r = Retired
- d = Defaulted
- SR = Special ranking

=== Finals ===
Semifinals
1	(Estonia) Kaia Kanepi	6	4	6
3	(Czech Republic) Brenda Fruhvirtová	3	6	2
(Serbia) Lola Radivojević	3	6	6
7	(Germany) Noma Noha Akugue	6	3	4

Final
1	(Estonia) Kaia Kanepi	6	7^{7}
(Serbia) Lola Radivojević	2	6^{5}

=== Top half ===
First round
1	(Estonia) K Kanepi	6	6
(Liechtenstein) K von Deichmann	4	3
SE	(United States) J Aney	5	6	2
WC	(Netherlands) IL van den Broek	7	2	6
Q	(Netherlands) L Tran	7	6
(Croatia) J Fett	5	2
(Czech Republic) A Sisková	5	3
8	(France) A Robbe	7	6
3	(Czech Republic) B Fruhvirtová	7^{7}	3	6
(Bulgaria) I Shinikova	6^{2}	6	4
Q	(Netherlands) A Bakker	7	7
WC	(Netherlands) J Gimbrère	5	5
Q	(Netherlands) A Koevermans	6	6
WC	(Netherlands) S van Emst	3	0
(Slovakia) V Morvayová	2	1
6	D Astakhova	6	6

Second round
1	(Estonia) K Kanepi	6	6
WC	(Netherlands) IL van den Broek	3	3
Q	(Netherlands) L Tran	6	4	0
8	(France) A Robbe	3	6	6
3	(Czech Republic) B Fruhvirtová	6	6
Q	(Netherlands) A Bakker	4	0
Q	(Netherlands) A Koevermans	6	6
6	D Astakhova	4	3

Quarterfinals
1	(Estonia) K Kanepi	5
8	(France) A Robbe	1^{r}
3	(Czech Republic) B Fruhvirtová	7	7^{7}
Q	(Netherlands) A Koevermans	5	6^{1}

Semifinals
1	(Estonia) K Kanepi	6	4	6
3	(Czech Republic) B Fruhvirtová	3	6	2

=== Bottom half ===
First round
LL	(Germany) T Morderger	3	1
Q	(Turkey) A Aksu	6	6
(Serbia) L Radivojević	6	6
Q	(Japan) N Hanatani	1	4
Q	(United States) C Scholl	6	6
Q	(Greece) M Laki	1	2
WC	(Netherlands) L Stevens	6	6^{5}	0
4	(Switzerland) Y In-Albon	4	7^{7}	6
7	(Germany) N Noha Akugue	6	4	6
(Czech Republic) D Šalková	4	6	0
(Germany) L Papadakis	4	4
(Croatia) L Bošković	6	6
(Turkey) B Cengiz	5	6^{4}
(Netherlands) S Lamens	7	7^{7}
Q	(Netherlands) S Visscher	6^{4}	3
2	(France) O Dodin	7^{7}	6

Second round
Q	(Turkey) A Aksu	3	2
(Serbia) L Radivojević	6	6
Q	(United States) C Scholl	6	6^{4}	4
4	(Switzerland) Y In-Albon	2	7^{7}	6
7	(Germany) N Noha Akugue	6	3	7^{7}
(Croatia) L Bošković	3	6	6^{1}
(Netherlands) S Lamens	4	4
2	(France) O Dodin	6	6

Quarterfinals
(Serbia) L Radivojević	6	6
4	(Switzerland) Y In-Albon	4	3
7	(Germany) N Noha Akugue	7^{7}	6
2	(France) O Dodin	6^{1}	4

Semifinals
(Serbia) L Radivojević	3	6	6
7	(Germany) N Noha Akugue	6	3	4
