= 2024 ITF Men's World Tennis Tour =

Entry-level tennis series

Details
- Duration: January – December 2024
- Edition: 27th
- Categories: M25 tournaments M15 tournaments

Achievements (singles)

The 2024 International Tennis Federation (ITF) Men's World Tennis Tour is an entry level tour for men's professional tennis. It is organized by the International Tennis Federation and is a tier below the ATP Challenger Tour. The men's tour includes tournaments with prize money of either $US15,000 or $25,000. The results of ITF tournaments are incorporated into the ATP ranking, which enables professionals to progress to the ATP Challenger Tour and ATP Tour, and ultimately the Grand Slams. The ITF offers approximately 600 tournaments across 70 countries.

Since 2022, following the Russian invasion of Ukraine the ITF announced that players from Belarus and Russia could still play on the tour but would not be allowed to play under the flag of Belarus or Russia.

== Cancelled/postponed tournaments ==
The following tournaments were formally announced by the ITF before being subsequently cancelled or postponed.

Week of	Tournament	Status
January 22	Zahra, Kuwait; M25 – Hard	Cancelled
February 5	Monastir, Tunisia; M15 – Hard	Cancelled
February 12	Monastir, Tunisia; M15 – Hard	Cancelled
February 19	Monastir, Tunisia; M15 – Hard	Cancelled
March 11	Loule, Portugal; M25 – Hard	Cancelled
April 1	Luján, Argentina; M15 – Clay	Cancelled
May 13	Prague, Czechia; M25 – Clay	Cancelled
May 20	Most, Czechia; M25 – Clay	Cancelled
May 27	Jablonec nad Nisou, Czechia; M25 – Clay	Cancelled
May 27	Rome, Italy; M15 – Clay	Cancelled
July 1	Biella, Italy; M25 – Clay	Cancelled
August 26	Allershausen, Germany; M15 – Clay	Cancelled
September 2	Buschhausen, Germany; M15 – Clay	Cancelled
September 23	Forbach, France; M15 – Carpet (i)	Cancelled
October 14	Hua Hin, Thailand; M15 – Hard	Cancelled
October 21	Hua Hin, Thailand; M15 – Hard	Cancelled
October 28	Las Vegas, United States; M15 – Hard	Cancelled
November 4	Benicarló, Spain; M25 – Clay	Cancelled
November 11	Maputo, Mozambique; M25 – Hard	Cancelled

== Participating host nations ==
- Angola (ANG)
- Argentina (ARG)
- Armenia (ARM)
- Australia (AUS)
- Austria (AUT)
- Belgium (BEL)
- Bosnia and Herzegovina (BIH)
- Brazil (BRA)
- Bulgaria (BUL)
- Canada (CAN)
- Chile (CHI)
- China (CHN)
- Chinese Taipei (TPE)
- Colombia (COL)
- Congo (CGO)
- Croatia (CRO)
- Cyprus (CYP)
- Czech Republic (CZE)
- Denmark (DEN)
- Dominican Republic (DOM)
- Egypt (EGY)
- Ethiopia (ETH)
- Finland (FIN)
- France (FRA)
- Georgia (GEO)
- Germany (GER)
- Great Britain (GBR)
- Greece (GRE)
- Guam (GUM)
- Guatemala (GUA)
- Hong Kong (HKG)
- Hungary (HUN)
- India (IND)
- Indonesia (INA)
- Iran (IRI)
- Ireland (IRL)
- Italy (ITA)
- Jamaica (JAM)
- Japan (JPN)
- Kazakhstan (KAZ)
- Kuwait (KUW)
- Luxembourg (LUX)
- Mexico (MEX)
- Morocco (MAR)
- Mozambique (MOZ)
- Netherlands (NED)
- New Zealand (NZL)
- Paraguay (PAR)
- Peru (PER)
- Poland (POL)
- Portugal (POR)
- Qatar (QAT)
- Romania (ROM)
- Rwanda (RWA)
- Serbia (SER)
- Singapore (SGP)
- Slovakia (SVK)
- Slovenia (SLO)
- South Africa (RSA)
- South Korea (KOR)
- Spain (ESP)
- Sweden (SWE)
- Switzerland (SUI)
- Thailand (THA)
- Tunisia (TUN)
- Turkey (TUR)
- Uganda (UGA)
- Uruguay (URU)
- United States (USA)
- Uzbekistan (UZB)

== Ranking points distribution ==
Category	W	F	SF	QF	R16	R32	Q	Q2	Q1
↓ ATP Ranking Points ↓
M25+H (S) / M25 (S)	25	16	8	3	1	–	–	–	–
M25+H (D) / M25 (D)	25	16	8	3	–	–	–	–	–
M15+H (S) / M15 (S)	15	8	4	2	1	–	–	–	–
M15+H (D) / M15 (D)	15	8	4	2	–	–	–	–	–
↓ ITF World Tennis Ranking Points ↓
M25+H (S)	–	–	–	–	–	–	4	1	–
M25 (S)	–	–	–	–	–	–	3	1	–
M15+H (S)	–	–	–	–	–	–	3	1	–
M15 (S)	–	–	–	–	–	–	2	1	–

- "+H" indicates that hospitality is provided.

== Prize money distribution ==
Category	W	F	SF	QF	R16	R32
M25+H (S) / M25 (S)	$3,600	$2,120	$1,255	$730	$430	$260
M25+H (D) / M25 (D)	$1,550	$900	$540	$320	$180	–
M15+H (S) / M15 (S)	$2,160	$1,272	$753	$438	$258	$156
M15+H (D) / M15 (D)	$930	$540	$324	$192	$108	–

- Doubles prize money per team

== Statistics ==
These tables present the number of singles (S) and doubles (D) titles won by each player and each nation during the season. The players/nations are sorted by:

1. Total number of titles (a doubles title won by two players representing the same nation counts as only one win for the nation)
2. A singles > doubles hierarchy
3. Alphabetical order (by family names for players).

To avoid confusion and double counting, these tables should be updated only after all events of the week are completed.

== See also ==
- 2024 ATP Tour
- 2024 ATP Challenger Tour
- 2024 WTA Tour
- 2024 ITF Women's World Tennis Tour
