= Alba Rey García =

Spanish tennis player (born 2002)

- Country (sports): Spain
- Born: 29 June 2002 (age 24) Águilas, Murcia
- Plays: Right (two-handed backhand)
- Prize money: $57,821

Singles
- Career record: 165–147
- Career titles: 2 ITF
- Highest ranking: No. 560 (22 September 2025)
- Current ranking: No. 618 (20 July 2026)

Doubles
- Career record: 53–53
- Career titles: 3 ITF
- Highest ranking: No. 304 (20 July 2026)
- Current ranking: No. 304 (20 July 2026)
- Last updated on: 21 July 2026.

Alba Rey García (born June 29, 2002) is a Spanish professional tennis player. She has a career-high doubles ranking by the WTA of 304, achieved on 20 July 2026.

== Early life ==
Born in Águilas, Rey García's role models in tennis are Rafael Nadal, Maria Sharapova, Serena Williams, and Garbine Muguruza.

== Career ==
In December 2022, she won her first singles ITF Circuit title at the W15 event held in Valencia, Spain. The Águilas Tennis Club player had a difficult season. She had undergone surgery for a meniscus injury about six months ago and taken a break from tennis. García won the final by defeating her compatriot Claudia Hoster in two sets.

In September 2025, she became champion in singles at the W15 event held in Dénia, Spain.

Partnering Celia Cerviño Ruiz, Rey García won the W75 2026 Open Araba en Femenino, defeating Carmen Gallardo Guevara and Eugenia Zozaya Menéndez in the final. She won the first major professional championship of her career.

== ITF Circuit finals ==
=== Singles: 6 (2 titles, 4 runner-ups) ===
Legend W35 tournaments W15 tournaments (2–4)	Finals by surface Hard (0–1) Clay (2–3)

Result	W–L	Date	Tournament	Tier	Surface	Opponent	Score
Loss	0–1	Feb 2020	ITF Palma Nova, Spain	W15	Clay	(Czech Republic) Anna Sisková	3–6, 1–6
Win	1–1	Nov 2022	ITF Valencia, Spain	W15	Clay	(Spain) Claudia Hoste Ferrer	6–2, 6–0
Loss	1–2	Dec 2022	ITF Valencia, Spain	W15	Clay	(France) Tiantsoa Rakotomanga Rajaonah	3–6, 6–4, 3–6
Loss	1–3	Mar 2025	ITF Heraklion, Greece	W15	Clay	(Bulgaria) Rositsa Dencheva	6–2, 1–6, 1–6
Loss	1–4	May 2025	Torneo Conchita Martínez, Spain	W15	Hard	(United Kingdom) Alice Gillan	6–3, 2–6, 3–6
Win	2–4	Sep 2025	ITF Dénia, Spain	W15	Clay	(Italy) Verena Meliss	6–2, 7–5

=== Doubles: 8 (3 titles, 5 runner-ups) ===
Legend W75 tournaments (1–1) W50 tournaments (0–1) W35 tournaments (1–2) W15 tournaments (1–1)	Finals by surface Hard (2–1) Clay (0–4) Carpet (1–0)

Result	W-L	Date	Tournament	Tier	Surface	Partner	Opponents	Score
Loss	0–1	Sep 2024	ITF Ceuta, Spain	W15	Clay	(Spain) Judith Perelló Saavedra	(Belgium) Kaat Coppez (Belgium) Amélie van Impe	2–3 ret.
Loss	0–2	May 2025	ITF Platja d'Aro, Spain	W35	Clay	(Spain) María Martínez Vaquero	(Switzerland) Jenny Dürst (Switzerland) Valentina Ryser	4–6, 5–7
Win	1–2	May 2025	Torneo Conchita Martínez, Spain	W15	Hard	(Spain) María Martínez Vaquero	(Netherlands) Joy de Zeeuw (United Kingdom) Ranah Stoiber	6–4, 6–2
Win	2–2	Jul 2025	ITF Don Benito, Spain	W35	Carpet	(Spain) María Martínez Vaquero	(United Kingdom) Esther Adeshina (United Kingdom) Victoria Allen	7–5, 6–2
Loss	2–3	Aug 2025	ITF Ourense, Spain	W50	Hard	(Spain) María Martínez Vaquero	(Japan) Momoko Kobori (Japan) Ayano Shimizu	4–6, 1–6
Loss	2–4	Oct 2025	ITF Seville, Spain	W35	Clay	(Spain) María Martínez Vaquero	(Italy) Anastasia Abbagnato (Italy) Federica Urgesi	4–6, 4–6
Loss	2–5	May 2026	Empire Slovak Open, Slovakia	W75	Clay	(Spain) María Martínez Vaquero	(Finland) Laura Hietaranta (Slovakia) Nina Vargová	2–6, 3–6
Win	3–5	Jul 2026	Open Araba en Femenino, Spain	W75	Hard	(Spain) Celia Cerviño Ruiz	(Spain) Carmen Gallardo Guevara (Spain) Eugenia Zozaya Menéndez	6–4, 7–6^{(6)}
