= Britt du Pree =

Dutch tennis player (born 2007)

- 2026 at an event in France
- Country (sports): Netherlands
- Born: 8 January 2007 (age 19) Amersfoort, Netherlands
- Plays: Right-handed
- Prize money: $52,607

Singles
- Career record: 104–47
- Career titles: 3 ITF
- Highest ranking: No. 275 (19 October 2026)
- Current ranking: No. 275 (19 October 2026)

Doubles
- Career record: 56–15
- Career titles: 8 ITF
- Highest ranking: No. 243 (13 July 2026)
- Current ranking: No. 263 (26 October 2026)
- Last updated on: 31 October 2026.

Britt du Pree (born January 8, 2007) is a Dutch tennis player. She has career-high WTA rankings of No. 275 in singles, achieved on 19 October 2026, and No. 243 in doubles, reached on 13 July 2026. She has won three singles titles and eight in doubles on the ITF Women's World Tennis Tour.

== Career ==
In 2019, she became the singles champion in the under-12 girls' category at the Dutch Junior Tennis Championships held in Hilversum, Netherlands.

In January 2024, she became the champion at the under-16 tournament held in the Hague, Netherlands. In September, she won the doubles title with Joy de Zeeuw at the European Junior Tennis Championships held in Oberpullendorf, Austria.

In September 2025, she won her first singles title at a W15 event held in Haren, Netherlands.

In March 2026, Du Pree made her debut for the Netherlands Billie Jean King Cup team.

In July 2026, she won the doubles title at the W75 event ITF The Hague in the Netherlands with her partner Sarah van Emst, achieving her first major championship title.

== ITF Circuit finals ==
=== Singles: 6 (3 titles, 3 runner-ups) ===
Legend W35 tournaments (2–1) W15 tournaments (1–2)	Finals by surface Hard (1–3) Clay (2–0)

Result	W–L	Date	Tournament	Tier	Surface	Opponent	Score
Loss	0–1	Feb 2025	ITF Manacor, Spain	W15	Hard	(Bulgaria) Elizara Yaneva	6–2, 4–6, 3–6
Loss	0–2	Mar 2025	ITF Manacor, Spain	W15	Hard	(Belgium) Jeline Vandromme	2–6, 3–6
Win	1–2	Sep 2025	ITF Haren, Netherlands	W15	Clay	(Netherlands) Loes Ebeling Koning	6–4, 3–6, 6–3
Loss	1–3	Nov 2025	ITF Faro, Portugal	W35	Hard	(Spain) Marina Bassols Ribera	6–1, 2–6, 1–6
Win	2–3	May 2026	ITF Båstad, Sweden	W35	Clay	(Turkey) Çağla Büyükakçay	6–1, 6–1
Win	3–3	Sep 2026	ITF Reims, France	W35	Hard (i)	(Netherlands) Isis Louise van den Broek	walkover

=== Doubles: 11 (8 titles, 3 runner-ups) ===
Legend W75 tournaments (1–0) W50 tournaments (1–0) W35 tournaments (2–1) W15 tournaments (4–2)	Finals by surface Hard (3–2) Clay (5–1)

Result	W–L	Date	Tournament	Tier	Surface	Partner	Opponents	Score
Loss	0–1	Nov 2024	Sharm El Sheikh, Egypt	W15	Hard	(Netherlands) Joy de Zeeuw	(Netherlands) Loes Ebeling Koning (Netherlands) Sarah van Emst	6–7^{(4)}, 6–4, [9–11]
Loss	0–2	Jan 2025	ITF Sharm El Sheikh	W15	Hard	(Netherlands) Joy de Zeeuw	Daria Khomutsianskaya; Varvara Panshina	5–7, 4–6
Win	1–2	Mar 2025	ITF Monastir, Tunisia	W15	Hard	(Netherlands) Sarah van Emst	(Serbia) Elena Milovanovic (France) Nina Radovanovic	6–3, 3–6, [10–7]
Win	2–2	Apr 2025	ITF Kuršumlijska Banja, Serbia	W15	Clay	(Netherlands) Joy de Zeeuw	(Ukraine) Anastasiia Firman (Montenegro) Tea Nikčević	6–3, 6–3
Win	3–2	Apr 2025	ITF Oegstgeest, Netherlands	W15	Clay	(Netherlands) Joy de Zeeuw	(Netherlands) Demi Tran (Germany) Marie Vogt	4–6, 6–3, [10–3]
Win	4–2	May 2025	ITF Kalmar, Sweden	W15	Clay	(Netherlands) Annelin Bakker	(Netherlands) Loes Ebeling Koning (Netherlands) Sarah van Emst	6–3, 6–3
Win	5–2	Oct 2025	ITF Loulé, Portugal	W35	Hard	(Netherlands) Sarah van Emst	(Romania) Briana Szabó (Ukraine) Daria Yesypchuk	6–3, 6–0
Win	6–2	Jan 2026	ITF Monastir, Tunisia	W50	Hard	(Netherlands) Sarah van Emst	(United Kingdom) Alicia Dudeney (France) Tiphanie Lemaître	6–2, 4–6, [10–6]
Loss	6–3	May 2026	ITF Platja d'Aro, Spain	W35	Clay	(Netherlands) Sarah van Emst	(Netherlands) Loes Ebeling Koning (Netherlands) Isis Louise van den Broek	5–7, 4–6
Win	7–3	May 2026	ITF Båstad, Sweden	W35	Clay	(Netherlands) Sarah van Emst	(Mexico) Fernanda Navarro (Colombia) María Paulina Pérez	6–4, 4–3 ret.
Win	8–3	Jul 2026	ITF The Hague, Netherlands	W75	Clay	(Netherlands) Sarah van Emst	(Italy) Nuria Brancaccio (Italy) Federica Urgesi	7–5, 6–3
