= Torneo Conchita Martínez =

Torneo Internacional de Tenis Femenino "Conchita Martínez"

Women's World Tennis Tour
- Event name: Torneo Internacional de Tenis Femenino "Conchita Martínez"
- Location: Monzón, Spain
- Venue: Club Tenis Monzón
- Category: ITF Women's Circuit
- Surface: Hard
- Draw: 32S/32Q/16D
- Prize money: $25,000
- Website: Torneo Conchita Martínez (in Spanish)

The Torneo Internacional de Tenis Femenino "Conchita Martínez" – Trofeo Hinaco Monzón is a tournament for professional female tennis players. The event is classified as a $25,000 ITF Women's Circuit tournament. It has been held on outdoor hardcourts annually in Monzón, Spain, since 2003. The event was previously a $75,000 tournament from 2007 to 2010. The 2012 edition of the tournament was not held.

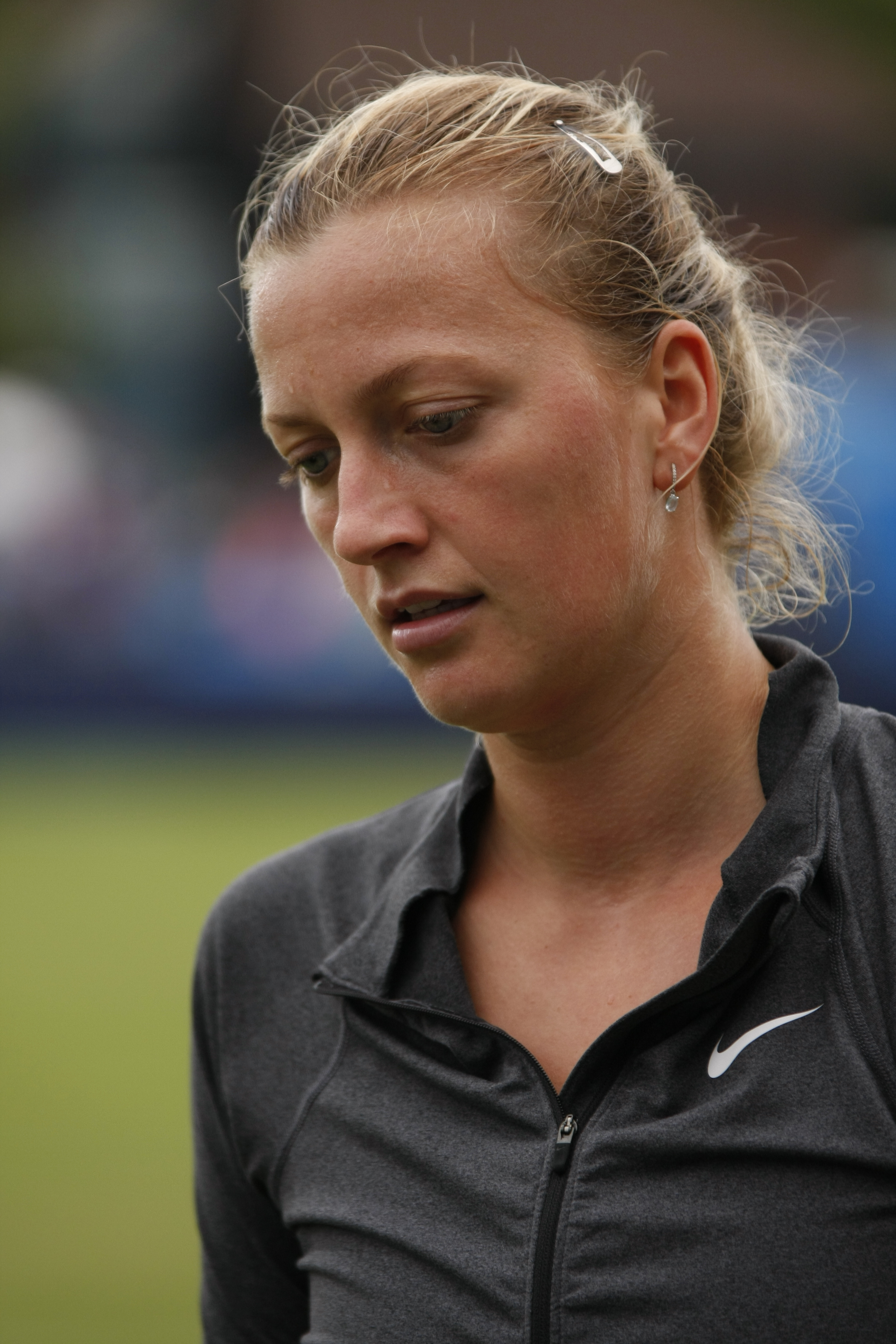
Petra Kvitová was the winner of the 2008 edition

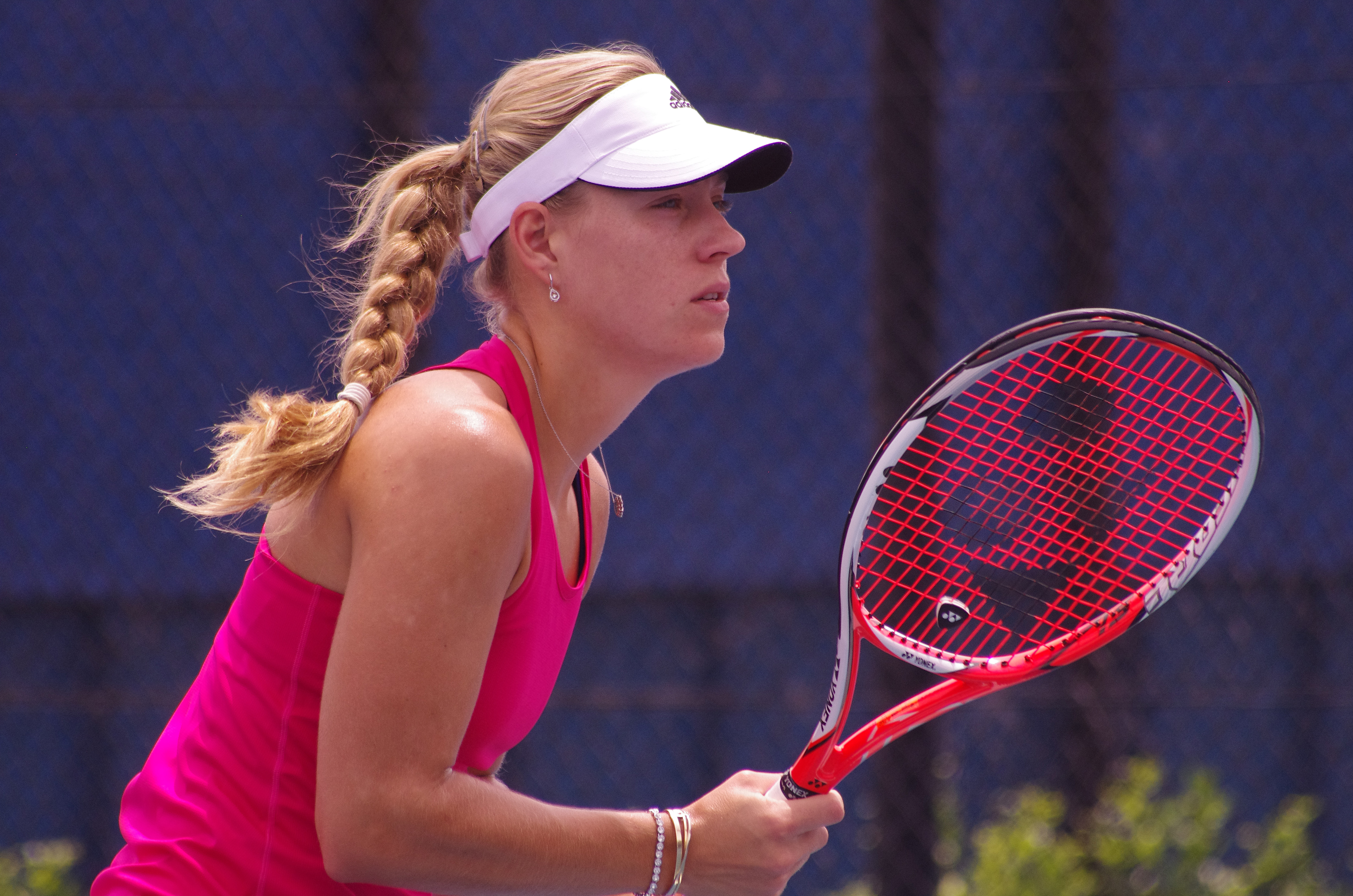
Angelique Kerber was a two-time runner-up of the tournament, in 2005 and 2007

== Past finals ==
=== Singles ===
Year	Champion	Runner-up	Score
2026	(United States) Shannon Lam	(Ukraine) Anastasiia Firman	6–4, 6–4
2025	(United Kingdom) Alice Gillan	(Spain) Alba Rey García	3–6, 6–2, 6–3
2024	(United Kingdom) Sonay Kartal	(Czech Republic) Linda Klimovičová	6–1, 6–0
2023	(Czech Republic) Gabriela Knutson	(Australia) Maddison Inglis	6–4, 6–2
2020–22	tournament cancelled due to the COVID-19 pandemic		
2019	(Argentina) Nadia Podoroska	(Spain) Cristina Bucșa	6–2, 4–6, 6–2
2018	(United Kingdom) Katie Swan	(Spain) Aliona Bolsova	6–2, 6–3
2017	(Spain) Georgina García Pérez	(Czech Republic) Marie Bouzková	6–1, 6–3
2016	(Czech Republic) Marie Bouzková	(France) Jessika Ponchet	6–4, 6–4
2015	(Spain) Georgina García Pérez	(Spain) Cristina Sánchez Quintanar	6–4, 6–2
2014	(Austria) Janina Toljan	(Spain) María José Luque Moreno	6–3, 5–7, 6–0
2013	(Russia) Polina Vinogradova	(Spain) Nuria Párrizas Díaz	6–1, 6–1
2012	not held		
2011	(Czech Republic) Petra Cetkovská	(Belgium) Kirsten Flipkens	5–7, 6–4, 6–2
2010	(Belarus) Anastasiya Yakimova	(Slovakia) Zuzana Kučová	6–4, 4–6, 6–3
2009	(Japan) Kimiko Date-Krumm	(Romania) Alexandra Dulgheru	7–5, 6–2
2008	(Czech Republic) Petra Kvitová	(Belgium) Yanina Wickmayer	2–6, 6–4, 7–5
2007	(United States) Lilia Osterloh	(Germany) Angelique Kerber	6–3, 7–6^{(7–4)}
2006	(United States) Diana Ospina	(United Kingdom) Amanda Keen	6–4, 6–2
2005	(Ukraine) Olena Antypina	(Germany) Angelique Kerber	6–3, 6–3
2004	(Spain) Marta Fraga	(Switzerland) Aliénor Tricerri	6–0, 6–4
2003	(Portugal) Frederica Piedade	(France) Kildine Chevalier	6–4, 6–3

=== Doubles ===
Year	Champions	Runners-up	Score
2026	(Ukraine) Anastasiia Firman (China) Liu Min	(Spain) Isabel Pascual Montalvo (United States) Kate Sharabura	4–6, 7–5, [10–6]
2025	(Spain) María Martínez Vaquero (Spain) Alba Rey García	(Netherlands) Joy de Zeeuw (United Kingdom) Ranah Stoiber	6–4, 6–2
2024	(Brazil) Ana Candiotto (France) Tiphanie Lemaître	(Austria) Tamira Paszek (Switzerland) Valentina Ryser	2–6, 6–0, [10–5]
2023	(Luxembourg) Marie Weckerle (Australia) Gabriella Da Silva Fick	(Spain) Georgina García Pérez (Spain) Laura García Astudillo	6–2, 6–1
2020–22	tournament cancelled due to the COVID-19 pandemic		
2019	(Croatia) Jana Fett (Hungary) Dalma Gálfi	(Greece) Despina Papamichail (Serbia) Nina Stojanović	7–6^{(7–2)}, 6–2
2018	(Spain) Cristina Bucșa (Russia) Yana Sizikova	(United Kingdom) Sarah Beth Grey (United Kingdom) Olivia Nicholls	6–2, 5–7, [10–8]
2017	(Venezuela) Andrea Gámiz (Spain) Georgina García Pérez	(Georgia (country)) Sofia Shapatava (Ukraine) Valeriya Strakhova	6–3, 6–4
2016	(France) Alice Bacquié (United Kingdom) Gabriella Taylor	(Spain) Estrella Cabeza Candela (Spain) Cristina Sánchez Quintanar	6–1, 6–1
2015	(Spain) Georgina García Pérez (Spain) Olga Parres Azcoitia	(Turkey) Başak Eraydın (United Kingdom) Francesca Stephenson	6–4, 6–2
2014	(Spain) Ariadna Martí Riembau (Spain) Marta Sexmilo Pascual	(Italy) Giulia Sussarello (Austria) Janina Toljan	4–6, 6–4, [10–5]
2013	(Argentina) Tatiana Búa (Spain) Lucía Cervera Vázquez	(Spain) Arabela Fernández Rabener (Russia) Yana Sizikova	4–6, 7–5, [10–6]
2012	not held		
2011	(Russia) Elena Bovina (Russia) Valeria Savinykh	(Georgia (country)) Margalita Chakhnashvili (Croatia) Ivana Lisjak	6–1, 2–6, [10–4]
2010	(Romania) Alexandra Dulgheru (Thailand) Tamarine Tanasugarn	(Indonesia) Yayuk Basuki (United States) Riza Zalameda	6–2, 6–0
2009	(Chinese Taipei) Chen Yi (Russia) Vesna Manasieva	(Italy) Alberta Brianti (Georgia (country)) Margalita Chakhnashvili	2–6, 6–4, [10–8]
2008	(Japan) Rika Fujiwara (Switzerland) Emmanuelle Gagliardi	(Spain) María José Martínez Sánchez (Spain) Arantxa Parra Santonja	1–6, 7–6^{(7–5)}, [10–8]
2007	(Spain) Estrella Cabeza Candela (Argentina) María Emilia Salerni	(Belarus) Iryna Kuryanovich (Russia) Vesna Manasieva	6–2, 6–1
2006	(Australia) Monique Adamczak (Germany) Annette Kolb	(Poland) Olga Brózda (Israel) Yevgenia Savransky	7–5, 6–3
2005	(Ukraine) Olena Antypina (South Africa) Surina De Beer	(Czech Republic) Petra Cetkovská (Spain) Gabriela Velasco Andreu	7–5, 7–5
2004	(Brazil) Larissa Carvalho (Portugal) Neuza Silva	(Brazil) Joana Cortez (Brazil) Marina Tavares	6–2, 6–4
2003	(Ukraine) Olena Antypina (Russia) Raissa Gourevitch	(Romania) Liana Balaci (France) Kildine Chevalier	3–6, 7–5, 6–1
