= Amstelveen Women's Open =

ITF Women's Tour
- Event name: Amstelveen Women's Open
- Location: Amstelveen, Netherlands
- Venue: NTC de Kegel Amstelveen
- Category: ITF Women's World Tennis Tour
- Surface: Clay / Outdoor
- Draw: 32S/32Q/16D
- Prize money: $25,000

The Amstelveen Women's Open is a tournament for professional female tennis players played on outdoor clay courts. The event is classified as a $25,000 ITF Women's World Tennis Tour tournament and has been held in Amstelveen, Netherlands, since 2021. Between 2021 and 2023, the event was a $60k tournament.

== Past finals ==
=== Singles ===
Year	Champion	Runner-up	Score
2026	(Poland) Weronika Falkowska	(Netherlands) Anouck Vrancken Peeters	6–2, 7–6^{(7–4)}
2025	(Germany) Katharina Hobgarski	(United States) Louisa Chirico	0–1 ret.
2024	(Australia) Jaimee Fourlis	(Turkey) Berfu Cengiz	7–6^{(7–2)}, 2–6, 6–1
2023	(Estonia) Kaia Kanepi	(Serbia) Lola Radivojević	6–2, 7–6^{(7–5)}
2022	(Switzerland) Simona Waltert	(United States) Emma Navarro	7–6^{(12–10)}, 6–0
2021	(Netherlands) Quirine Lemoine	(Germany) Yana Morderger	7–5, 6–4

=== Doubles ===
Year	Champions	Runners-up	Score
2026	(Netherlands) Isis Louise van den Broek (Netherlands) Sarah van Emst	(Netherlands) Joy de Zeeuw (Netherlands) Antonia Stoyanov	6–4, 2–6, [10–7]
2025	(Netherlands) Joy de Zeeuw (Netherlands) Sarah van Emst	(Netherlands) Jasmijn Gimbrère (Netherlands) Stéphanie Visscher	1–6, 6–2, [10–8]
2024	(Netherlands) Michaëlla Krajicek (Netherlands) Eva Vedder	Victoria Kan; Ekaterina Makarova	walkover
2023	(Germany) Noma Noha Akugue (Luxembourg) Marie Weckerle	(Turkey) Ayla Aksu (Croatia) Ena Kajević	7–5, 6–3
2022	(Spain) Aliona Bolsova (Spain) Guiomar Maristany	(Czech Republic) Michaela Bayerlová (Czech Republic) Aneta Laboutková	6–2, 6–2
2021	(Netherlands) Suzan Lamens (Netherlands) Quirine Lemoine	(Russia) Amina Anshba (Czech Republic) Anastasia Dețiuc	6–4, 6–3
