= Joy de Zeeuw =

Dutch tennis player (born 2006)

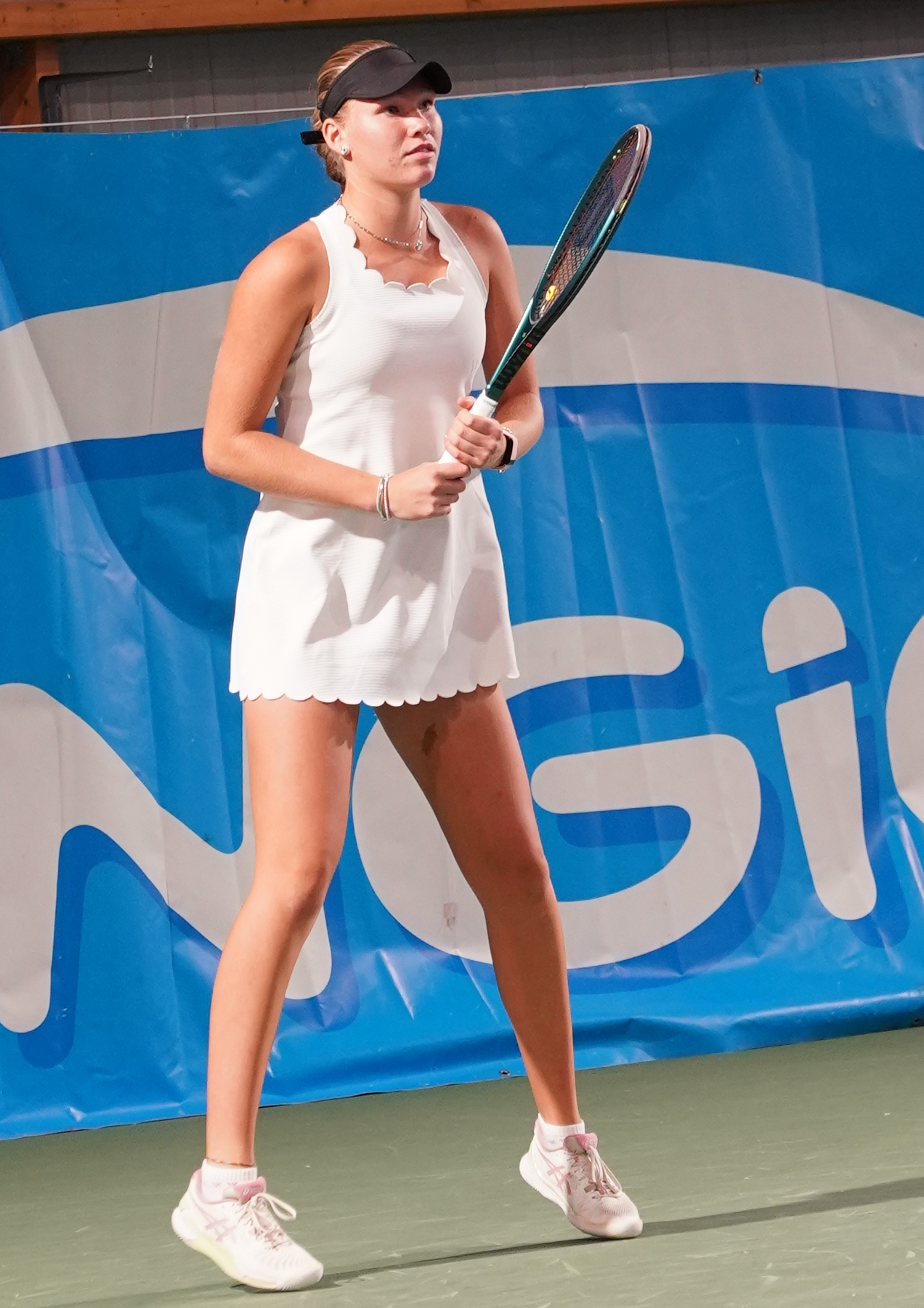
- 2025
- Country (sports): Netherlands
- Born: 15 May 2006 (age 20) Vlaardingen, Netherlands
- Plays: Right (two-handed backhand)
- Prize money: $30,128

Singles
- Career record: 43–37
- Career titles: 2 ITF
- Highest ranking: No. 545 (15 September 2025)
- Current ranking: No. 1,158 (3 August 2026)

Grand Slam singles results
- Australian Open Junior: 2R (2024)
- French Open Junior: 3R (2024)
- Wimbledon Junior: 1R (2024)

Doubles
- Career record: 75–14
- Career titles: 14 ITF
- Highest ranking: No. 243 (20 October 2025)
- Current ranking: No. 464 (3 August 2026)

Grand Slam doubles results
- Australian Open Junior: 1R (2024)
- French Open Junior: QF (2024)
- Wimbledon Junior: 2R (2024)
- US Open Junior: SF (2024)
- Last updated on: 12 August 2026.

Joy de Zeeuw (born 15 May 2006) is a Dutch professional tennis player.

== Early life ==
De Zeeuw is from Vlaardingen, South Holland, the daughter of a tennis coach. She began playing tennis at the age of three years-old.

== Career ==
She made her junior Grand Slam debut at the 2024 Australian Open. She lost to Mingge Xu at the 2024 Wimbledon Championships – Girls' singles. She became European U18 doubles champion alongside Britt du Pree in 2024. She won her first professional title in Villena, Spain in October 2024 and won her second the following month in Sharm El Sheikh, Egypt.

De Zeeuw won her first W75 title at ITF The Hague in the Netherlands, in the doubles draw, partnering Arantxa Rus.

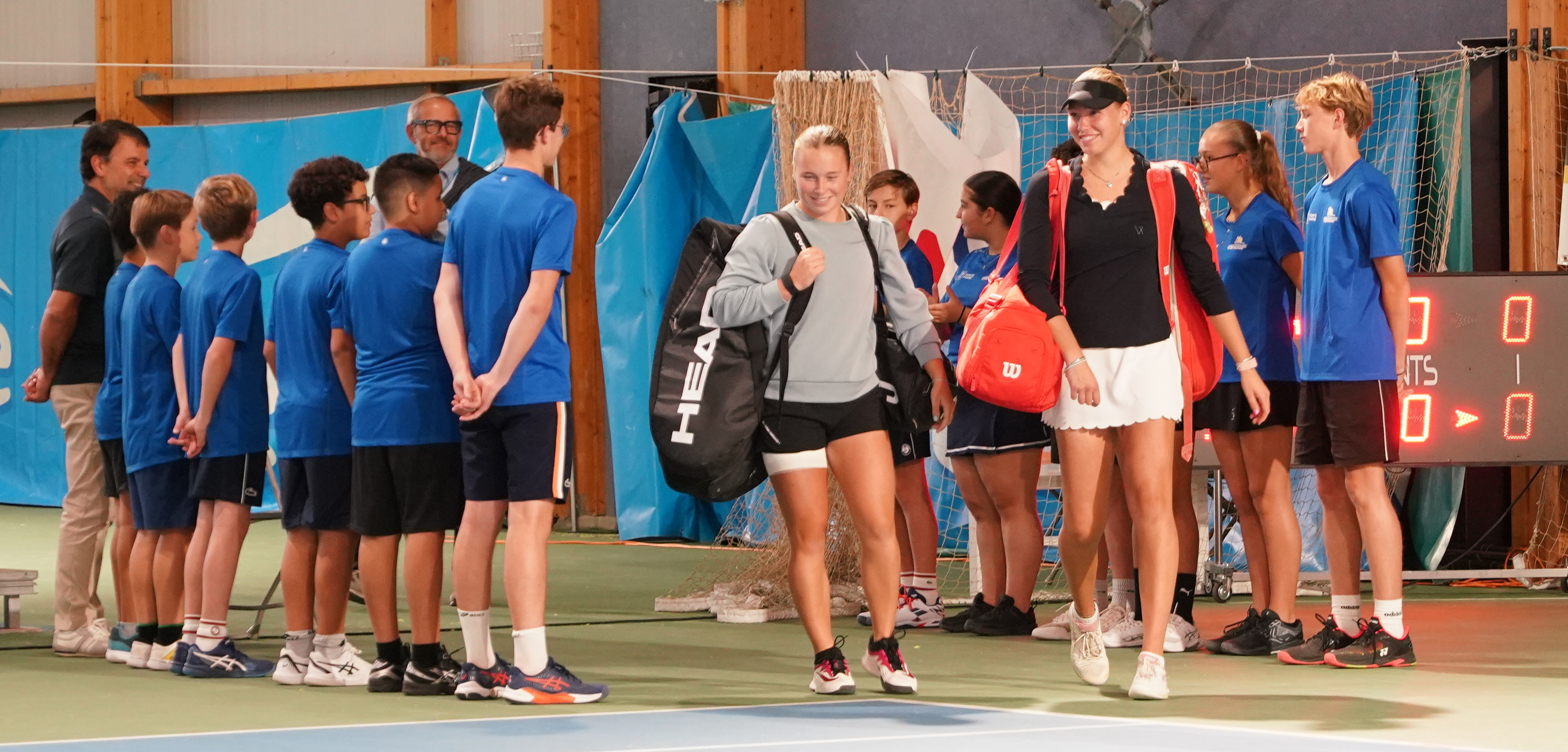
Doubles with van Emst.

== ITF Circuit finals ==
=== Singles: 3 (2 titles, 1 runner-ups) ===
Legend W15 tournaments (2–1)	Finals by surface Hard (2–1)

Result	W–L	Date	Tournament	Tier	Surface	Opponent	Score
Loss	0–1	Oct 2024	ITF Sant Vicenç de Torelló, Spain	W15	Hard	(Spain) Ruth Roura Llaverias	1–6, 6–7^{(6)}
Win	1–1	Oct 2024	ITF Villena, Spain	W15	Hard	(Hungary) Adrienn Nagy	7–6^{(7)}, 6–3
Win	2–1	Nov 2024	ITF Sharm El Sheikh, Egypt	W15	Hard	Kristiana Sidorova	7–6^{(5)}, 6–2

=== Doubles: 20 (14 titles, 6 runner-ups) ===
Legend W75 tournaments W50 tournaments W35 tournaments W15 tournaments	Finals by surface Hard (6–4) Clay (8–2)

Result	W–L	Date	Tournament	Tier	Surface	Partner	Opponents	Score
Win	1–0	Aug 2023	ITF Eindhoven, Netherlands	W15	Clay	(Netherlands) Sarah van Emst	(Netherlands) Rose Marie Nijkamp (Netherlands) Isis Louise van den Broek	6–1, 4–6, [10–8]
Win	2–0	Jul 2024	ITF Rogaška Slatina, Slovenia	W15	Clay	(Czech Republic) Alena Kovačková	(Slovakia) Anika Jašková (Czech Republic) Karolína Vlčková	4–6, 6–4, [10–7]
Win	3–0	Oct 2024	ITF Sant Vicenç de Torelló, Spain	W15	Hard	(Spain) Ruth Roura Llaverias	(Netherlands) Rose Marie Nijkamp (Netherlands) Isis Louise van den Broek	2–6, 6–3, [11–9]
Win	4–0	Oct 2024	ITF Villena, Spain	W15	Hard	(Hungary) Adrienn Nagy	(Netherlands) Rose Marie Nijkamp (Netherlands) Isis Louise van den Broek	walkover
Loss	4–1	Nov 2024	Sharm El Sheikh, Egypt	W15	Hard	(Kazakhstan) Sandugash Kenzhibayeva	Aglaya Fedorova; Alisa Kummel	4–6, 3–6
Loss	4–2	Nov 2024	Sharm El Sheikh, Egypt	W15	Hard	(Netherlands) Britt du Pree	(Netherlands) Loes Ebeling Koning (Netherlands) Sarah van Emst	6–7^{(4)}, 6–4, [9–11]
Win	5–2	Jan 2025	ITF Oslo, Norway	W15	Hard (i)	(Sweden) Linea Bajraliu	(United Kingdom) Amelia Rajecki (Slovakia) Katarína Strešnáková	6–3, 6–0
Loss	5–3	Jan 2025	ITF Sharm El Sheikh, Egypt	W15	Hard	(Netherlands) Britt du Pree	Daria Khomutsianskaya; Varvara Panshina	5–7, 4–6
Win	6–3	Apr 2025	ITF Kuršumlijska Banja, Serbia	W15	Clay	(Netherlands) Britt du Pree	(Ukraine) Anastasiia Firman (Montenegro) Tea Nikčević	6–3, 6–3
Win	7–3	Apr 2025	ITF Oegstgeest, Netherlands	W15	Clay	(Netherlands) Britt du Pree	(Netherlands) Demi Tran (Germany) Marie Vogt	4–6, 6–3, [10–3]
Loss	7–4	May 2025	Torneo Conchita Martínez, Spain	W15	Clay	(United Kingdom) Ranah Stoiber	(Spain) María Martínez Vaquero (Spain) Alba Rey García	4–6, 2–6
Win	8–4	May 2025	ITF Estepona, Spain	W15	Hard	(Slovakia) Viktória Morvayová	(Uzbekistan) Vlada Ekshibarova (Belgium) Clara Vlasselaer	4–6, 6–1, [10–5]
Win	9–4	Jun 2025	Amstelveen Open, Netherlands	W35	Clay	(Netherlands) Sarah van Emst	(Netherlands) Jasmijn Gimbrère (Netherlands) Stéphanie Visscher	1–6, 6–2, [10–8]
Win	10–4	Jul 2025	ITF The Hague, Netherlands	W75	Clay	(Netherlands) Arantxa Rus	Polina Bakhmutkina; Kristina Kroitor	6–2, 6–2
Win	11–4	Aug 2025	ITF Vigo, Spain	W35	Hard	(Czech Republic) Vendula Valdmannová	(United States) Carol Young Suh Lee (Australia) Tenika McGiffin	7–5, 6–2
Win	12–4	Aug 2025	ITF Oldenzaal, Netherlands	W50	Clay	(Netherlands) Sarah van Emst	(Germany) Noma Noha Akugue (Turkey) İpek Öz	7–6^{(3)}, 7–6^{(4)}
Win	13–4	Sep 2025	ITF Haren, Netherlands	W15	Clay	(Netherlands) Sarah van Emst	(Denmark) Rebecca Munk Mortensen (Denmark) Johanne Svendsen	6–2, 3–6, [12–10]
Win	14–4	Sep 2025	ITF Reims, France	W35	Hard (i)	(Netherlands) Sarah van Emst	(Switzerland) Jenny Dürst (France) Marie Mattel	6–3, 6–4
Loss	14–5	Jun 2026	Amstelveen Open, Netherlands	W35	Clay	(Netherlands) Antonia Stoyanov	(Netherlands) Isis Louise van den Broek (Netherlands) Sarah van Emst	4–6, 6–2, [7–10]
Loss	14–6	Oct 2026	ITF Loulé, Portugal	W35	Hard	(Netherlands) Isis Louise van den Broek	(China) Liu Min (Italy) Carlotta Moccia	3–6, 6–3, [8–10]
