= Marie Weckerle =

Luxembourgish tennis player (born 2003)

- Country (sports): Luxembourg
- Born: 4 May 2003 (age 23)
- Prize money: $40,530

Singles
- Career record: 120–100
- Career titles: 0
- Highest ranking: No. 516 (21 October 2024)
- Current ranking: No. 638 (22 September 2025)

Doubles
- Career record: 52–55
- Career titles: 4 ITF
- Highest ranking: No. 309 (20 May 2024)
- Current ranking: No. 613 (22 September 2025)

Team competitions
- Fed Cup: 5–7
- Last updated on: 22 September 2025.

Marie Weckerle (born 4 May 2003) is a Luxembourgish tennis player.

Weckerle has won four doubles titles on the ITF Women's Circuit. On 21 October 2024, she reached her best singles ranking of world No. 516. On 20 May 2024, she peaked at No. 309 in the WTA doubles rankings.

Partnering Noma Noha Akugue, Weckerle won her first $60k tournament in July 2023 at the Amstelveen Women's Open, defeating Ayla Aksu and Ena Kajević in the final.

Playing for Luxembourg, Weckerle has a win-loss record of 5–7 in Fed Cup competition (as of July 2024).

== ITF Circuit finals ==
=== Singles: 5 (5 runner-ups) ===
Legend W25/35 tournaments (0–1) W15 tournaments (0–4)	Finals by surface Hard (0–4) Clay (0–1)

Result	W–L	Date	Tournament	Tier	Surface	Opponent	Score
Loss	0–1	Feb 2024	ITF Manacor, Spain	W15	Hard	(Sweden) Caijsa Hennemann	5–7, 2–6
Loss	0–2	Mar 2024	ITF Sharm El Sheikh, Egypt	W15	Hard	(Norway) Malene Helgø	3–6, 2–6
Loss	0–3	Aug 2024	ITF Wanfercée-Baulet, Belgium	W15	Clay	(Indonesia) Janice Tjen	2–6, 2–6
Loss	0–4	Apr 2025	ITF Sharm El Sheikh, Egypt	W15	Hard	(Poland) Weronika Ewald	6–3, 4–6, 0–6
Loss	0–5	Oct 2025	ITF Bakersfield, United States	W35	Hard	(United States) Vivian Wolff	4–6, 1–6

=== Doubles: 10 (5 titles, 5 runner-ups) ===
Legend W60 tournaments (1–0) W25/35 tournaments (1–3) W15 tournaments (3–2)	Finals by surface Hard (4–5) Clay (1–0)

Result	W–L	Date	Tournament	Tier	Surface	Partner	Opponents	Score
Win	1–0	May 2023	ITF Monzón, Spain	W25	Hard	(Australia) Gabriella Da Silva-Fick	(Spain) Laura García Astudillo (Spain) Georgina García Pérez	6–2, 6–1
Win	2–0	Jul 2023	Amstelveen Open, Netherlands	W60	Clay	(Germany) Noma Noha Akugue	(Turkey) Ayla Aksu (Croatia) Ena Kajević	7–5, 6–3
Loss	2–1	Nov 2023	ITF Selva Gardena, Italy	W25	Hard (i)	(Serbia) Bojana Marinković	(Netherlands) Jasmijn Gimbrère (Poland) Martyna Kubka	1–6, 4–6
Win	3–1	May 2024	ITF Estepona, Spain	W15	Hard	(Sweden) Jacqueline Cabaj Awad	(Kazakhstan) Gozal Ainitdinova; Elina Nepliy	6–4, 6–4
Loss	3–2	Oct 2024	ITF Loulé, Portugal	W35	Hard	(Slovakia) Salma Drugdová	(Japan) Michika Ozeki (Netherlands) Lian Tran	4–6, 2–6
Loss	3–3	Feb 2025	ITF Manacor, Spain	W15	Hard	(Italy) Anastasia Abbagnato	(Netherlands) Loes Ebeling Koning (Netherlands) Sarah van Emst	4–6, 6–4, [6–10]
Win	4–3	Apr 2025	ITF Sharm El Sheikh, Egypt	W15	Hard	(Kosovo) Arlinda Rushiti	(United Kingdom) Amelia Rajecki (United Kingdom) Ranah Stoiber	6–2, 6–3
Loss	4–4	Sep 2025	ITF San Rafael, United States	W35	Hard	(Slovenia) Živa Falkner	(Italy) Francesca Pace (Poland) Zuzanna Pawlikowska	6–4, 3–6, [5–10]
Win	5–4	Apr 2026	ITF Singapore	W15	Hard (i)	(Japan) Rinko Matsuda	(Japan) Erika Sema (Chinese Taipei) Tsao Chia-yi	7–6^{(8–6)}, 6–2
Loss	5–5	Aug 2026	ITF Hurghada, Egypt	W15	Hard	(France) Laïa Petretic	(Egypt) Hania Abouelsaad; Margarita Betova	3–6, 6–3, [3–10]
