= Sarah van Emst =

Dutch tennis player (born 2004)

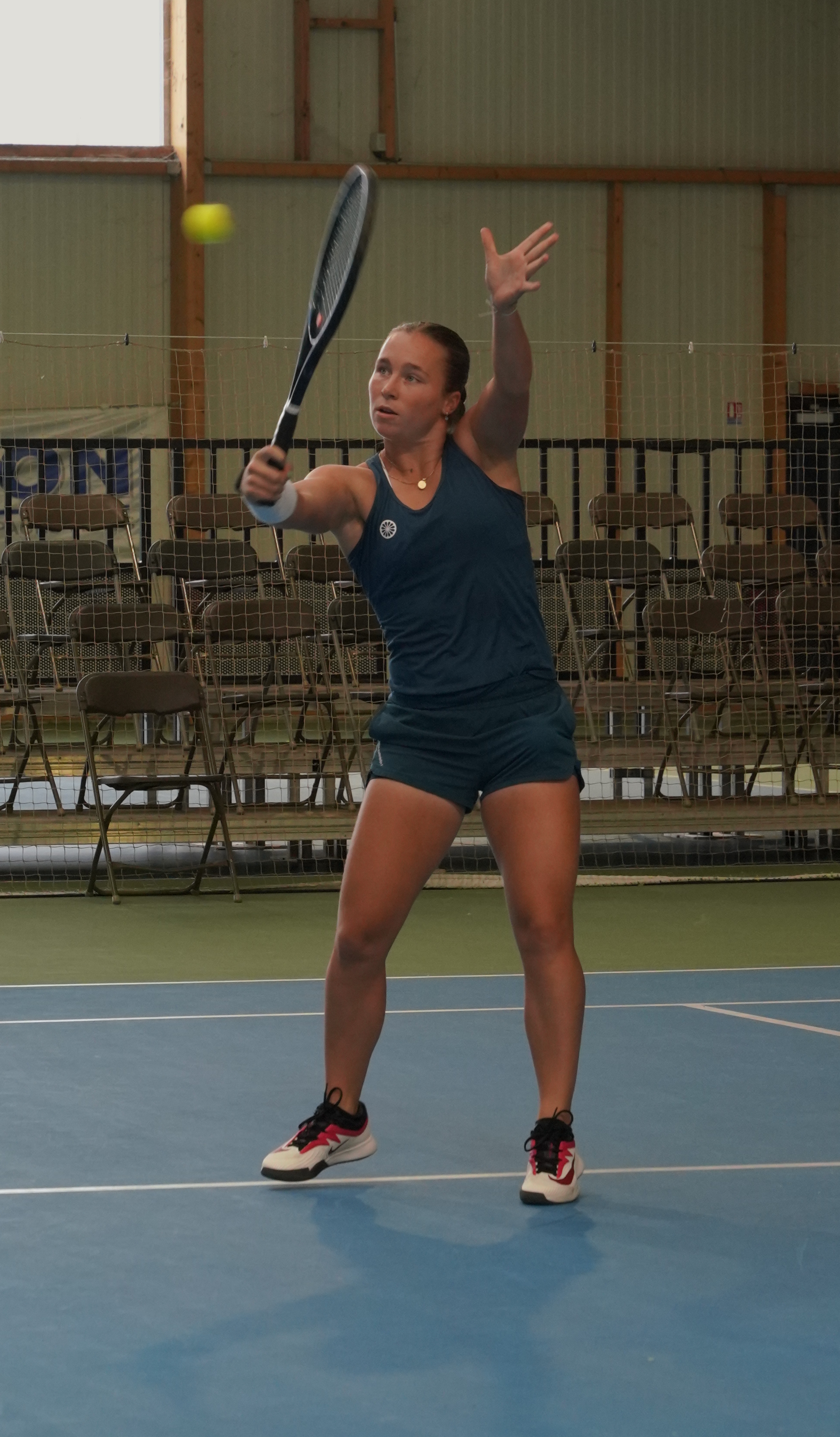
- 2025 in Reims, France
- Country (sports): Netherlands
- Born: 6 November 2004 (age 22)
- Plays: Right-handed
- Prize money: $63,588

Singles
- Career record: 79–50
- Career titles: 2 ITF
- Highest ranking: No. 459 (8 June 2026)
- Current ranking: No. 531 (26 October 2026)

Doubles
- Career record: 148–39
- Career titles: 26 ITF
- Highest ranking: No. 187 (20 July 2026)
- Current ranking: No. 189 (26 October 2026)
- Last updated on: 30 October 2026.

Sarah van Emst (born 6 November 2004) is a Dutch tennis player. She has career-high WTA rankings of No. 459 in singles, reached on 8 June 2026, and No. 187 in doubles, achieved on 20 July 2026.

== Early life ==
From Zwolle, Overijssel, she started playing tennis at six years-of-age. Her parents Kristel and Alfred were both club players. She showed aptitude for tennis at an early age and was number-three-ranked U16 girl in the Dutch tennis rankings in 2019.

== Career ==
She obtained her first professional ranking point in 2023 June at the age of 18 in Alkmaar. She reached the final of an ITF tournament for the first time in December 2023, in Monastir, Tunisia but was defeated in the final by Russian player Milana Zhabrailova. She had not been past the quarterfinals before and her run included a win over higher ranked Romanian player Andreea Prisacariu, who had been the top seed.

In March 2025, she won her second singles title at a W15 tournament in Monastir. In June 2025, she was awarded a wildcard into the doubles main draw from the Rosmalen Open for her WTA Tour debut, to play alongside fellow Dutch player Suzan Lamens.

== ITF Circuit finals ==
=== Singles: 3 (2 titles, 1 runner-up) ===
Legend W35 tournaments (1–0) W15 tournaments (1–1)	Finals by surface Hard (1–1) Clay (1–0)

Result	W–L	Date	Tournament	Tier	Surface	Opponent	Score
Loss	0–1	Nov 2023	ITF Monastir, Tunisia	W15	Hard	Milana Zhabrailova	2–6, 6–2, 3–6
Win	1–1	Mar 2025	ITF Monastir, Tunisia	W15	Hard	(Serbia) Elena Milovanović	7–6^{(8)}, 6–4
Win	2–1	May 2026	ITF Klagenfurt, Austria	W35	Clay	(Germany) Nastasja Schunk	3–6, 7–5, 6–2

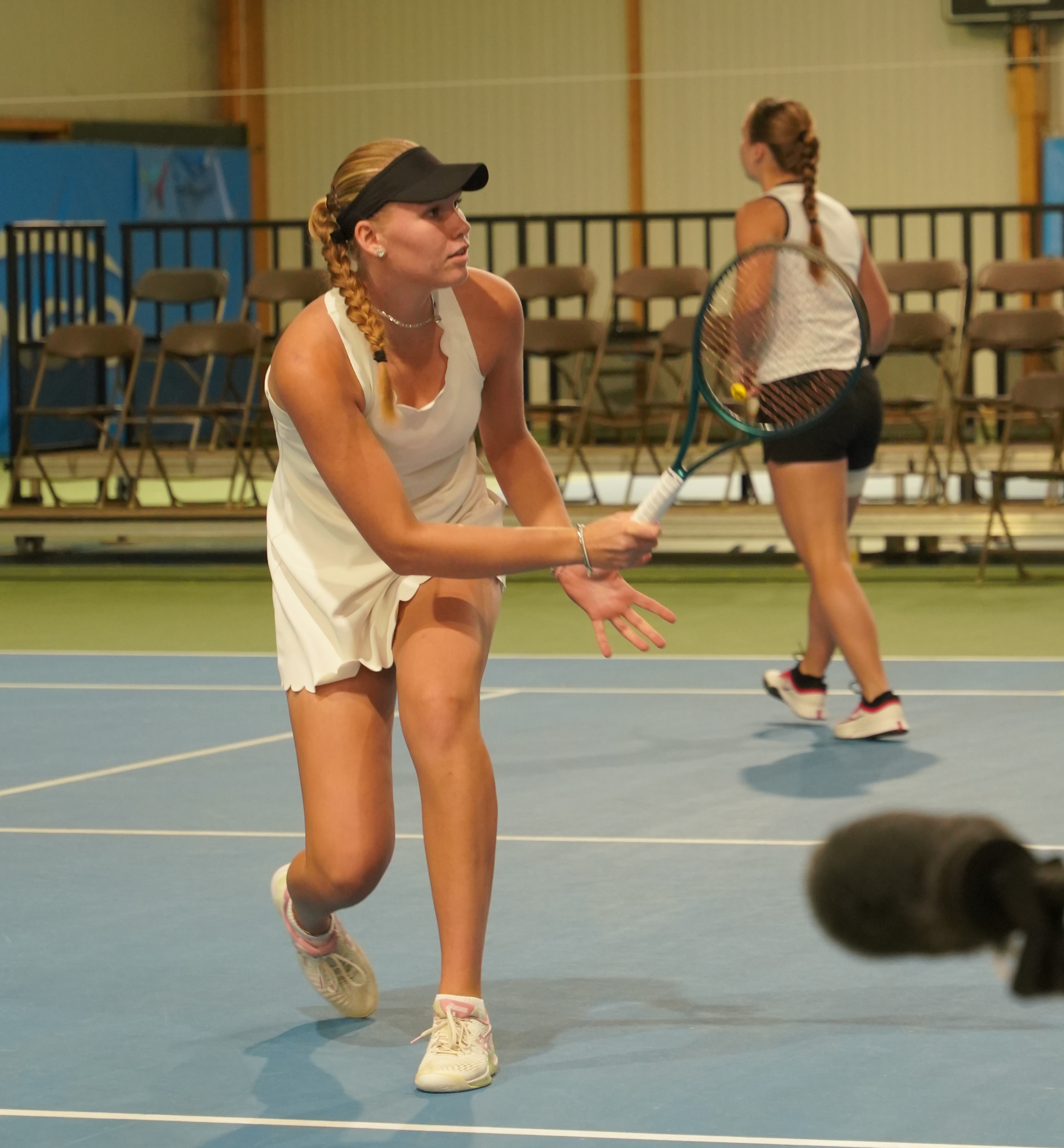
Partnered with Joy de Zeeuw

=== Doubles: 32 (27 titles, 5 runner-ups) ===
Legend W75 tournaments (1–1) W50 tournaments (4–0) W35 tournaments (6–2) W15 tournaments (16–2)	Finals by surface Hard (12–1) Clay (15–4)

Result	W–L	Date	Tournament	Tier	Surface	Partner	Opponents	Score
Win	1–0	Sep 2022	ITF Haren, Netherlands	W15	Clay	(Netherlands) Annelin Bakker	(Ukraine) Mariia Bergen (Argentina) Agustina Chipac	6–3, 6–7^{(2)}, [10–5]
Win	2–0	Aug 2023	ITF Eindhoven, Netherlands	W15	Clay	(Netherlands) Joy de Zeeuw	(Netherlands) Rose Marie Nijkamp (Netherlands) Isis Louise van den Broek	6–1, 4–6, [10–8]
Win	3–0	Feb 2024	ITF Sharm El Sheikh, Egypt	W15	Hard	(South Korea) Jeong Bo-young	Evgeniya Burdina (Egypt) Yasmin Ezzat	6–2, 6–1
Win	4–0	Feb 2024	ITF Sharm El Sheikh, Egypt	W15	Hard	(Netherlands) Annelin Bakker	(Romania) Elena-Teodora Cadar (Austria) Melanie Klaffner	6–1, 6–0
Win	5–0	Apr 2024	ITF Telde, Spain	W15	Clay	(Netherlands) Isis Louise van den Broek	(Belgium) Tilwith Di Girolami (France) Laia Petretic	6–4, 2–6, [10–2]
Loss	5–1	Apr 2024	ITF Telde, Spain	W15	Clay	(Belgium) Tilwith Di Girolami	(Czech Republic) Michaela Bayerlová (Netherlands) Stéphanie Visscher	4–6, 2–6
Win	6–1	Jun 2024	ITF Alkmaar, Netherlands	W15	Clay	(Netherlands) Michaëlla Krajicek	(New Zealand) Valentina Ivanov (Denmark) Rebecca Munk Mortensen	6–4, 6–4
Loss	6–2	Jul 2024	ITF The Hague, Netherlands	W75	Clay	(Netherlands) Annelin Bakker	(Australia) Jaimee Fourlis (Australia) Petra Hule	4–6, 2–6
Win	7–2	Jul 2024	ITF Kuršumlijska Banja, Serbia	W15	Clay	(Netherlands) Annelin Bakker	(Belgium) Tilwith Di Girolami (Netherlands) Loes Ebeling Koning	6–4, 3–6, [10–4]
Win	8–2	Aug 2024	ITF Kuršumlijska Banja	W15	Clay	(Netherlands) Loes Ebeling Koning	Ulyana Hrabavets (Bulgaria) Galena Krastenova	6–0, 6–4
Win	9–2	Dec 2024	ITF Sharm El Sheikh, Egypt	W15	Hard	(Netherlands) Loes Ebeling Koning	(Netherlands) Joy de Zeeuw (Netherlands) Britt du Pree	7–6^{(4)}, 4–6, [11–9]
Win	10–2	Feb 2025	ITF Manacor, Spain	W15	Hard	(Netherlands) Loes Ebeling Koning	(Italy) Anastasia Abbagnato (Luxembourg) Marie Weckerle	6–4, 4–6, [10–6]
Win	11–2	Mar 2025	ITF Manacor, Spain	W15	Hard	(Netherlands) Isis Louise van den Broek	(Netherlands) Jasmijn Gimbrère (France) Alice Robbe	6–4, 6–4
Win	12–2	Mar 2025	ITF Monastir, Tunisia	W15	Hard	(Netherlands) Britt du Pree	(Serbia) Elena Milovanović (France) Nina Radovanovic	6–3, 3–6, [10–7]
Loss	12–3	May 2025	ITF Kalmar, Sweden	W15	Clay	(Netherlands) Loes Ebeling Koning	(Netherlands) Annelin Bakker (Netherlands) Britt du Pree	3–6, 3–6
Win	13–3	Jun 2025	ITF Alkmaar, Netherlands	W15	Clay	(Netherlands) Loes Ebeling Koning	(Netherlands) Rose Marie Nijkamp (Netherlands) Isis Louise van den Broek	7–6^{(4)}, 6–3
Win	14–3	Jul 2025	Amstelveen Open, Netherlands	W35	Clay	(Netherlands) Joy de Zeeuw	(Netherlands) Jasmijn Gimbrère (Netherlands) Stéphanie Visscher	1–6, 6–2, [10–8]
Loss	14–4	Aug 2025	ITF Knokke-Heist, Belgium	W35	Clay	(France) Yara Bartachevich	(Italy) Anastasia Abbagnato (Greece) Despina Papamichail	5–7, 1–6
Win	15–4	Aug 2025	ITF Oldenzaal, Netherlands	W50	Clay	(Netherlands) Joy de Zeeuw	(Germany) Noma Noha Akugue (Turkey) İpek Öz	7–6^{(3)}, 7–6^{(4)}
Win	16–4	Sep 2025	ITF Haren, Netherlands	W15	Clay	(Netherlands) Joy de Zeeuw	(Denmark) Rebecca Munk Mortensen (Denmark) Johanne Svendsen	6–2, 3–6, [12–10]
Win	17–4	Oct 2025	ITF Reims, France	W35	Hard (i)	(Netherlands) Joy de Zeeuw	(Switzerland) Jenny Dürst (France) Marie Mattel	6–3, 6–4
Win	18–4	Nov 2026	ITF Loulé, Portugal	W35	Hard	(Netherlands) Britt du Pree	(Romania) Briana Szabó (Ukraine) Daria Yesypchuk	6–3, 6–0
Win	19–4	Jan 2026	ITF Monastir, Tunisia	W50	Hard	(Netherlands) Britt du Pree	(United Kingdom) Alicia Dudeney (France) Tiphanie Lemaître	6–2, 4–6, [10–6]
Win	20–4	Apr 2026	ITF Monastir, Tunisia	W15	Hard	(Serbia) Elena Milovanović	(Belarus) Yuliya Hatouka (Belarus) Hanna Kubarawa	6–2, 7–5
Win	21–4	Apr 2026	ITF Monastir, Tunisia	W15	Hard	(Belgium) Kaat Coppez	(United Kingdom) Esther Adeshina (Switzerland) Chelsea Fontenel	6–2, 6–2
Loss	21–5	May 2026	ITF Monastir, Tunisia	W35	Hard	(Netherlands) Britt du Pree	(Netherlands) Loes Ebeling Koning (Netherlands) Isis Louise van den Broek	5–7, 4–6
Win	22–5	May 2026	ITF Bastad, Sweden	W35	Clay	(Netherlands) Britt du Pree	(Mexico) Fernanda Navarro (Colombia) María Paulina Pérez	6–4, 4–3 ret.
Win	23–5	Jun 2026	ITF Ystad, Sweden	W35	Clay	(Netherlands) Isis Louise van den Broek	(Spain) Lucía Cortez Llorca (Switzerland) Katerina Tsygourova	5–7, 7–6^{(3)}, [10–8]
Win	24–5	Jul 2026	Amstelveen Open, Netherlands	W35	Clay	(Netherlands) Isis Louise van den Broek	(Netherlands) Joy de Zeeuw (Netherlands) Antonia Stoyanov	6–4, 2–6, [10–7]
Win	25–5	Jul 2026	ITF The Hague, Netherlands	W75	Clay	(Netherlands) Britt du Pree	(Italy) Nuria Brancaccio (Italy) Federica Urgesi	7–5, 6–3
Win	26–5	Sep 2026	ITF Saint-Palais-sur-Mer, France	W50	Clay	(Finland) Laura Hietaranta	(Ukraine) Valeriya Strakhova (Netherlands) Demi Tran	6–2, 6–4
Win	27–5	Nov 2026	ITF Heraklion, Greece	W50	Clay	(Germany) Joëlle Steur	(Italy) Deborah Chiesa (Italy) Giorgia Pedone	6–0, 6–2
