= Isis Louise van den Broek =

Dutch tennis player (born 2005)

- 2026
- Country (sports): Netherlands
- Born: 28 December 2005 (age 20)
- Plays: Right-handed
- Prize money: $44,212

Singles
- Career record: 96–55
- Career titles: 2 ITF
- Highest ranking: No. 472 (2 March 2026)
- Current ranking: No. 619 (28 September 2026)

Doubles
- Career record: 65–27
- Career titles: 7 ITF
- Highest ranking: No. 360 (24 August 2026)
- Current ranking: No. 383 (28 September 2026)
- Last updated on: 1 October 2026.

Isis Louise Van den Broek (born 28 December 2005) is a Dutch tennis player. She has career-high WTA rankings of No. 472 in singles, reached on 2 March 2026, and 360 in doubles, achieved on 24 August 2026.

== Career ==
From Driebergen, she trained at the BK Tennis Academy in Doorn and the tennis academy in Hilversum. She won the Dutch Indoor Youth Championships in 2021. She transitioned from junior tennis to the professional ranks in 2023, and won her first senior title in September 2023 when she defeated German Eva Marie Voracek in Haren.

In June 2025, she was awarded a wildcard into the qualifying stages at the Rosmalen Open in 's-Hertogenbosch, Netherlands, and defeated Nadiia Kolb of Ukraine and compatriot Lian Tran to progress to make her WTA Tour main-draw debut, but lost in the first round to fellow qualifier Elena-Gabriela Ruse.

== ITF Circuit finals ==
=== Singles: 5 (2 titles, 3 runner-ups) ===
Legend W35 tournaments (0–1) W15 tournaments (2–3)	Finals by surface Hard (0–2) Clay (2–2)

Result	W–L	Date	Tournament	Tier	Surface	Opponent	Score
Loss	0–1	Aug 2023	ITF Eindhoven, Netherlands	W15	Clay	(Netherlands) Merel Hoedt	6–3, 3–6, 2–6
Win	1–1	Sep 2023	ITF Haren, Netherlands	W15	Clay	(Germany) Eva Marie Voracek	7–6^{(5)}, 6–0
Loss	1–2	Mar 2025	ITF Monastir, Tunisia	W15	Hard	(United States) Carol Young Suh Lee	3–6, 6–4, 2–6
Loss	1–3	Jun 2025	ITF Alkmaar, Netherlands	W15	Clay	(Netherlands) Rose Marie Nijkamp	6–1, 3–6, 4–6
Win	2–3	Jun 2026	ITF Alkmaar, Netherlands	W15	Clay	(Belgium) Margaux Maquet	6–4, 3–6, 6–2
Loss	2–4	Sep 2026	ITF Reims, France	W35	Hard (i)	(Netherlands) Britt du Pree	Walkover

=== Doubles: 15 (7 titles, 8 runner-ups) ===
Legend W50 tournaments (0–1) W35 tournaments (3–1) W15 tournaments (4–6)	Finals by surface Hard (1–4) Clay (6–4)

Result	W–L	Date	Tournament	Tier	Surface	Partner	Opponents	Score
Loss	0–1	Jun 2023	ITF Alkmaar, Netherlands	W15	Clay	(Netherlands) Rose Marie Nijkamp	(Belgium) Tilwith Di Girolami (United States) Chiara Scholl	2–6, 1–6
Loss	0–2	Aug 2023	ITF Eindhoven, Netherlands	W15	Clay	(Netherlands) Rose Marie Nijkamp	(Netherlands) Joy de Zeeuw (Netherlands) Sarah van Emst	1–6, 6–4, [8–10]
Win	1–2	Apr 2024	ITF Telde, Spain	W15	Clay	(Netherlands) Sarah van Emst	(Belgium) Tilwith Di Girolami (France) Laïa Petretic	6–4, 2–6, [10–2]
Loss	1–3	Jul 2024	ITF Kuršumlijska Banja, Serbia	W15	Clay	(Netherlands) Rose Marie Nijkamp	Evgeniya Burdina (Serbia) Draginja Vuković	walkover
Win	2–3	Sep 2024	ITF Haren, Netherlands	W15	Clay	(Netherlands) Rose Marie Nijkamp	(Germany) Laura Böhner (Germany) Mina Hodzic	4–6, 7–6^{(4)}, [10–6]
Win	3–3	Sep 2024	ITF Dijon, France	W15	Clay	(Netherlands) Rose Marie Nijkamp	(Germany) Fabienne Gettwart (Germany) Mina Hodzic	7–6^{(1)}, 6–4
Loss	3–4	Oct 2024	ITF Sant Vicenç de Torelló, Spain	W15	Hard	(Netherlands) Rose Marie Nijkamp	(Netherlands) Joy de Zeeuw (Spain) Ruth Roura Llaverias	6–2, 3–6, [9–11]
Loss	3–5	Oct 2024	ITF Villena, Spain	W15	Hard	(Netherlands) Rose Marie Nijkamp	(Netherlands) Joy de Zeeuw (Hungary) Adrienn Nagy	walkover
Win	4–5	Feb 2025	ITF Manacor, Spain	W15	Hard	(Netherlands) Sarah van Emst	(Netherlands) Jasmijn Gimbrère (France) Alice Robbe	6–4, 6–4
Loss	4–6	Jun 2025	ITF Alkmaar, Netherlands	W15	Clay	(Netherlands) Rose Marie Nijkamp	(Netherlands) Loes Ebeling Koning (Netherlands) Sarah van Emst	6–7^{(4)}, 3–6
Loss	4–7	Jan 2026	ITF Monastir, Tunisia	W50	Hard	(Netherlands) Loes Ebeling Koning	(France) Yasmine Mansouri (Serbia) Elena Milovanović	2–6, 3–6
Win	5–7	May 2026	ITF Platja d'Aro, Spain	W35	Clay	(Netherlands) Loes Ebeling Koning	(Netherlands) Britt du Pree (Netherlands) Sarah van Emst	7–5, 6–4
Win	6–7	Jun 2026	ITF Ystad, Sweden	W35	Clay	(Netherlands) Sarah van Emst	(Spain) Lucía Cortez Llorca (Switzerland) Katerina Tsygourova	5–7, 7–6^{(3)}, [10–8]
Win	7–7	Jun 2026	Amstelveen Open, Netherlands	W35	Clay	(Netherlands) Sarah van Emst	(Netherlands) Joy de Zeeuw (Netherlands) Antonia Stoyanov	6–4, 2–6, [10–7]
Loss	7–8	Oct 2026	ITF Loulé, Portugal	W35	Hard	(Netherlands) Joy de Zeeuw	(China) Liu Min (Italy) Carlotta Moccia	3–6, 6–3, [8–10]
