= Jasmijn Gimbrère =

Dutch tennis player

- Country (sports): Netherlands
- Born: 6 March 2001 (age 25) Niebert, Netherlands
- Prize money: $106,431

Singles
- Career record: 192–166
- Career titles: 2 ITF
- Highest ranking: No. 399 (16 March 2026)
- Current ranking: No. 521 (26 October 2026)

Doubles
- Career record: 205–109
- Career titles: 18 ITF
- Highest ranking: No. 186 (30 June 2025)
- Current ranking: No. 225 (26 October 2026)
- Last updated on: 31 October 2026.

Jasmijn Gimbrère (born 6 March 2001) is a Dutch tennis player.

Gimbrère has a career-high singles ranking by the WTA of 399, reached on 16 March 2026. She also has a career-high WTA doubles ranking of 186, achieved on 30 June 2025.

She started playing tennis at the age of six with the support of her family. She lives in Niebert. In addition to tennis, she is studying psychology. At the end of 2021, she won her first professional singles championship in Egypt.

Gimbrère made her WTA Tour debut at the 2023 Ladies Open Lausanne, having received a wildcard entry into the doubles main draw.

In 2026, she won her second singles title in French Guiana where she defeated French player Alizé Lim in the final.

== ITF Circuit finals ==
=== Singles: 4 (2 titles, 2 runner-ups) ===
Legend W25/35 tournaments (0–2) W15 tournaments (2–0)	Finals by surface Hard (2–1) Clay (0–1)

Result	W–L	Date	Tournament	Tier	Surface	Opponent	Score
Win	1–0	Dec 2021	ITF Giza, Egypt	W15	Hard	(Greece) Sapfo Sakellaridi	6–0, 6–3
Loss	1–1	Apr 2023	ITF Bujumbura, Burundi	W25	Clay	(France) Alice Robbe	1–6, 2–6
Loss	1–2	Oct 2025	ITF Quebec City, Canada	W35	Hard (i)	(United Kingdom) Victoria Allen	6–7^{(3)}, 2–6
Win	2–2	Jan 2026	ITF Cayenne, France (Fr. Guiana)	W15	Hard	(France) Alizé Lim	6–4, 6–4

=== Doubles: 41 (18 titles, 23 runner-ups) ===
Legend W75 tournaments W40/50 tournaments W25/35 tournaments W15 tournaments	Finals by surface Hard (7–10) Clay (11–13)

Result	W–L	Date	Tournament	Tier	Surface	Partner	Opponents	Score
Loss	0–1	Jul 2021	ITF Cairo, Egypt	W15	Clay	(Netherlands) Demi Tran	(Spain) Claudia Hoste Ferrer (Spain) Leyre Romero Gormaz	1–6, 6–4, [9–11]
Win	1–1	Sep 2021	ITF Cairo, Egypt	W15	Clay	(Netherlands) Demi Tran	(Japan) Minami Akiyama (Japan) Lisa Marie Rioux	3–6, 6–4, [13–11]
Win	2–1	Sep 2021	ITF Cairo, Egypt	W15	Clay	(Netherlands) Lian Tran	(Thailand) Punnin Kovapitukted (Netherlands) Demi Tran	6–3, 3–6, [10–5]
Loss	2–2	Oct 2021	ITF Antalya, Turkey	W15	Clay	(Italy) Irene Lavino	(Sweden) Vanessa Ersöz (Sweden) Kajsa Rinaldo Persson	6–4, 1–6, [4–10]
Win	3–2	Oct 2021	ITF Istanbul, Turkey	W25	Hard (i)	(Netherlands) Bibiane Schoofs	(Poland) Maja Chwalińska (Czech Republic) Miriam Kolodziejová	6–2, 6–4
Win	4–2	Nov 2021	ITF Lousada, Portugal	W15	Hard (i)	(Switzerland) Naïma Karamoko	(Portugal) Inês Murta (India) Vasanti Shinde	w/o
Loss	4–3	Nov 2021	ITF Lousada, Portugal	W15	Hard (i)	(Australia) Alicia Smith	(Spain) Celia Cerviño Ruiz (Portugal) Matilde Jorge	1–6, 4–6
Win	5–3	Dez 2021	ITF Giza, Egypt	W15	Hard	(Oman) Fatma Al-Nabhani	(Greece) Sapfo Sakellaridi (Russia) Maria Sholokhova	2–6, 6–3, [10–5]
Loss	5–4	Dez 2021	ITF Giza, Egypt	W15	Hard	(Japan) Lisa Marie Rioux	(Greece) Sapfo Sakellaridi (China) You Mi Zhuoma	5–7, 3–6
Win	6–4	Jan 2022	ITF Monastir, Tunisia	W15	Hard	(Japan) Haruna Arakawa	(France) Kélia Le Bihan (France) Nina Radovanovic	6–4, 6–0
Loss	6–5	Feb 2022	ITF Santo Domingo, Dominican Republic	W25	Hard	(Netherlands) Isabelle Haverlag	(United States) Anna Rogers (United States) Christina Rosca	2–6, 2–6
Win	7–5	Jul 2022	ITF Hague, Netherlands	W25	Clay	(Netherlands) Isabelle Haverlag	(United States) Nikki Redelijk (Netherlands) Bente Spee	6–2, 6–4
Loss	7–6	Jul 2022	ITF Nottingham, UK	W25	Hard	(Netherlands) Isabelle Haverlag	(Chinese Taipei) Lee Pei-chi (Chinese Taipei) Wu Fang-hsien	3–6, 2–6
Loss	7–7	Okt 2022	ITF Sozopol, Bulgaria	W25	Hard	Ekaterina Yashina	Darya Astakhova; Irina Khromacheva	w/o
Win	8–7	Okt 2022	ITF Istanbul, Turkey	W25	Hard	Ekaterina Yashina	(Romania) Cristina Dinu (Georgia (country)) Sofia Shapatava	6–1, 3–6, [13–11]
Loss	8–8	Nov 2022	ITF Kirjat Motzkin, Israel	W25	Hard	Ekaterina Yashina	(Poland) Weronika Falkowska; Ekaterina Reyngold	6–4, 4–6, [4–10]
Loss	8–9	Apr 2023	ITF Bujumbura, Burundi	W25	Clay	(Germany) Jasmin Jebawy	Ksenia Laskutova (Sweden) Fanny Östlund	4–6, 3–6
Win	9–9	Apr 2023	ITF Bujumbura, Burundi	W25	Clay	(Germany) Jasmin Jebawy	Ksenia Laskutova (Sweden) Fanny Östlund	6–3, 6–4
Loss	9–10	Jul 2023	ITF The Hague, Netherlands	W40	Clay	(Netherlands) Isabelle Haverlag	(France) Kristina Mladenovic (Netherlands) Arantxa Rus	4–6, 0–6
Win	10–10	Nov 2023	ITF Selva Gardena, Italy	W25	Hard (i)	(Poland) Martyna Kubka	(Serbia) Bojana Marinković (Luxembourg) Marie Weckerle	6–1, 6–4
Win	11–10	Apr 2024	ITF Hammamet, Tunisia	W35	Clay	(Kazakhstan) Zhibek Kulambayeva	(Australia) Kaylah McPhee; Ksenia Zaytseva	6–4, 7–5
Loss	11–11	Jul 2024	ITF Stuttgart-Vaihingen, Germany	W35	Clay	(Netherlands) Stéphanie Visscher	(Romania) Cristina Dinu (Slovenia) Nika Radišić	6–3, 4–6, [4–10]
Win	12–11	Jul 2024	ITF Aschaffenburg, Germany	W35	Clay	(Netherlands) Stéphanie Visscher	(Romania) Andreea Prisăcariu (Czech Republic) Julie Štruplová	6–1, 1–6, [10–3]
Loss	12–12	Oct 2024	Toronto Challenger, Canada	W75	Hard (i)	(France) Julie Belgraver	(United States) Jamie Loeb (Lithuania) Justina Mikulskytė	2–6, 1–6
Win	13–12	Nov 2024	ITF Santo Domingo, Dominican Republic	W35	Hard	(Netherlands) Stéphanie Visscher	(France) Tiphanie Lemaître (Poland) Zuzanna Pawlikowska	4–6, 7–5, [10–6]
Loss	13–13	Jan 2025	ITF Naples, United States	W35	Clay	(France) Julie Belgraver	(United States) Allura Zamarripa (United States) Maribella Zamarripa	5–7, 1–6
Win	14–13	Jan 2025	ITF Palm Coast, US	W35	Clay	(Sweden) Lisa Zaar	(United States) Ayana Akli (United States) Abigail Rencheli	6–4, 3–6, [10–8]
Loss	14–14	Jan 2025	Vero Beach Open, US	W75	Clay	(France) Julie Belgraver	(United States) Carmen Corley (Netherlands) Eva Vedder	2–6, 3–6
Loss	14–15	Feb 2025	ITF Manacor, Spain	W15	Hard	(France) Alice Robbe	(Netherlands) Isis Louise van den Broek (Netherlands) Sarah van Emst	4–6, 4–6
Win	15–15	Apr 2025	ITF Santa Margherita di Pula, Italy	W35	Clay	(Netherlands) Stéphanie Visscher	(Norway) Astrid Brune Olsen (Japan) Hikaru Sato	6–4, 6–2
Loss	15–16	Apr 2025	ITF Santa Margherita di Pula, Italy	W35	Clay	(Netherlands) Stéphanie Visscher	(Norway) Astrid Brune Olsen (United States) Ashley Lahey	6–3, 4–6, [5–10]
Win	16–16	May 2025	Prague Open, Czech Republic	W75	Clay	(Czech Republic) Denisa Hindová	(Czech Republic) Aneta Kučmová (Greece) Sapfo Sakellaridi	7–6^{(5)}, 7–5
Loss	16–17	May 2025	ITF Warmbad Villach, Austria	W35	Clay	(United States) Rasheeda McAdoo	(Slovenia) Dalila Jakupović (Slovenia) Nika Radišić	4–6, 4–6
Loss	16–18	June 2025	ITF Klosters, Switzerland	W35	Clay	(United States) Ashley Lahey	(Italy) Deborah Chiesa (Italy) Lisa Pigato	0–6, 6–3, [6–10]
Loss	16–19	June 2025	Amstelveen Open, Netherlands	W35	Clay	(Netherlands) Stéphanie Visscher	(Netherlands) Joy de Zeeuw (Netherlands) Sarah van Emst	6–1, 2–6, [8–10]
Loss	16–20	Jul 2025	ITF Casablanca, Morocco	W35	Clay	(Poland) Zuzanna Pawlikowska	(Japan) Yuki Naito (Russia) Ekaterina Reyngold	7–6^{(5)}, 1–6, [3–10]
Loss	16–21	Oct 2025	Challenger de Saguenay, Canada	W75	Hard (i)	(United States) Anna Rogers	(Canada) Ariana Arseneault (Canada) Raphaëlle Lacasse	7–5, 3–6, [5–10]
Loss	16–22	Apr 2026	ITF Bujumbura, Burundi	W50	Clay	(India) Vaidehi Chaudhari	(United States) Julia Adams (Netherlands) Merel Hoedt	6–4, 5–7, [5–10]
Win	17–22	May 2026	ITF Klagenfurt, Austria	W35	Clay	(Greece) Sapfo Sakellaridi	(Bulgaria) Denislava Glushkova (Austria) Mavie Österreicher	6–0, 6–0
Win	18–22	Jun 2026	ITF Aix-les-Bains, France	W35	Clay	(Greece) Sapfo Sakellaridi	(France) Yara Bartashevich (France) Lucie Nguyen Tan	6–7^{(4)}, 7–5, [10–7]
Loss	18–23	Oct 2026	Challenger de Saguenay, Canada	W75	Hard (i)	(Czech Republic) Michaela Bayerlová	(United States) Reese Brantmeier (United States) Carson Tanguilig	2–6, 6–7^{(3)}
