= 2011 IPP Open – Singles =

Singles
- 2011 IPP Open

Final
- Champion: (Germany) Daniel Brands
- Runner-up: (Germany) Matthias Bachinger
- Score: 7–6^{(7–2)}, 7–6^{(7–5)}

Events
Singles	Doubles
← 2010 ·	IPP Open	· 2012 →

Ričardas Berankis is the defending champion, but lost in the first round to Adrian Mannarino.
Daniel Brands won the title, defeating Matthias Bachinger 7–6^{(7–2)}, 7–6^{(7–5)} in the final.

== Seeds ==
1. (Uzbekistan) Denis Istomin (second round)
2. (Finland) Jarkko Nieminen (withdrew due to a throat problem)
3. (France) Adrian Mannarino (second round)
4. (Australia) Matthew Ebden (first round)
5. (Slovakia) Martin Kližan (first round)
6. (Slovakia) Karol Beck (first round)
7. (Germany) Michael Berrer (quarterfinals)
8. (France) Stéphane Robert (first round)

== Draw ==
=== Key ===
- Q = Qualifier
- WC = Wild card
- LL = Lucky loser
- Alt = Alternate
- SE = Special exempt
- PR = Protected ranking
- ITF = ITF entry
- JE = Junior exempt
- w/o = Walkover
- r = Retired
- d = Defaulted
- SR = Special ranking

=== Finals ===
Semifinals
(Germany) Matthias Bachinger	6	6
SE	(Canada) Frank Dancevic	3	4
(Germany) Dustin Brown	4	6	3
(Germany) Daniel Brands	6	3	6

Final
(Germany) Matthias Bachinger	6^{2}	6^{5}
(Germany) Daniel Brands	7^{7}	7^{7}

=== Top half ===
First round
1	(Uzbekistan) D Istomin	6	6
WC	(Finland) M Kontinen	3	2
(Germany) M Bachinger	6	6
(France) B Paire	1	4
LL	(Germany) M Zverev	6^{3}	0
Q	(Finland) T Nieminen	7^{7}	6
(Poland) M Przysiężny	6	7^{7}
6	(Slovakia) K Beck	3	6^{3}
3	(France) A Mannarino	7^{7}	7
(Lithuania) R Berankis	6^{3}	5
(Turkey) M İlhan	2	7^{7}	4
(Estonia) J Zopp	6	6^{5}	6
SE	(Canada) F Dancevic	7	6
Q	(Argentina) F Delbonis	5	3
LL	(Germany) Jan-Lennard Struff	6^{4}	4
8	(France) S Robert	7^{7}	6

Second round
1	(Uzbekistan) D Istomin	4	4
(Germany) M Bachinger	6	6
Q	(Finland) T Nieminen	3	1
(Poland) M Przysiężny	6	6
3	(France) A Mannarino	7^{8}	5	1
(Estonia) J Zopp	6^{6}	7	6
SE	(Canada) F Dancevic	6	7
8	(France) S Robert	3	5

Quarterfinals
(Germany) M Bachinger	7^{7}	7
(Poland) M Przysiężny	6^{2}	5
(Estonia) J Zopp	3	3
SE	(Canada) F Dancevic	6	6

Semifinals
(Germany) M Bachinger	6	6
SE	(Canada) F Dancevic	3	4

=== Bottom half ===
First round
5	(Slovakia) M Kližan	3	4
(Germany) D Brown	6	6
(Slovakia) L Lacko	6	6
WC	(Serbia) M Djokovic	4	2
Q	(Russia) M Elgin	7^{7}	6
WC	(Finland) Herkko Pöllänen	6^{3}	4
(Romania) A Ungur	6	6
4	(Australia) M Ebden	4	2
7	(Germany) M Berrer	7^{7}	6
WC	(Finland) H Heliövaara	6^{4}	4
Q	(Slovakia) A Martin	6	6^{2}	6
(Argentina) H Zeballos	2	7^{7}	4
(France) K de Schepper	5	6^{4}
(Germany) D Brands	7	7^{7}
(Italy) P Lorenzi	6	6
LL	(United Kingdom) J Milton	4	4

Second round
(Germany) D Brown	1	6	7^{12}
(Slovakia) L Lacko	6	4	6^{10}
Q	(Russia) M Elgin	2	6	6
(Romania) A Ungur	6	3	3
7	(Germany) M Berrer	7^{7}	4	6
Q	(Slovakia) A Martin	6^{5}	6	1
(Germany) D Brands	6	6
(Italy) P Lorenzi	4	3

Quarterfinals
(Germany) D Brown	6	7
Q	(Russia) M Elgin	0	5
7	(Germany) M Berrer	6	3	4
(Germany) D Brands	4	6	6

Semifinals
(Germany) D Brown	4	6	3
(Germany) D Brands	6	3	6
