= 2012 IPP Open – Doubles =

Doubles
- 2012 IPP Open

Final
- Champions: (Russia) Mikhail Elgin (Slovakia) Igor Zelenay
- Runners-up: (Belarus) Uladzimir Ignatik (Chinese Taipei) Jimmy Wang
- Score: 4–6, 7–6^{(7–0)}, [10–4]

Events
Singles	Doubles
← 2011 ·	IPP Open	· 2013 →

Martin Emmrich and Andreas Siljeström were the defending champions but decided Emmrich not to participate.
Siljeström played alongside Jordan Kerr, losing in the first round.
Mikhail Elgin and Igor Zelenay defeated Uladzimir Ignatik and Jimmy Wang 4–6, 7–6^{(7–0)}, [10–4] in the final to win the title.

== Seeds ==
1. (Czech Republic) Lukáš Dlouhý / (Slovakia) Michal Mertiňák (semifinals)
2. (Germany) Dustin Brown / (Germany) Michael Kohlmann (quarterfinals)
3. (Germany) Frank Moser / (Germany) Simon Stadler (quarterfinals)
4. (Russia) Mikhail Elgin / (Slovakia) Igor Zelenay (champions)

== Draw ==
=== Key ===
- Q = Qualifier
- WC = Wild card
- LL = Lucky loser
- Alt = Alternate
- SE = Special exempt
- PR = Protected ranking
- ITF = ITF entry
- JE = Junior exempt
- w/o = Walkover
- r = Retired
- d = Defaulted
- SR = Special ranking

=== Draw ===
First round
1	(Czech Republic) L Dlouhý (Slovakia) M Mertiňák	6	7^{7}
(Australia) C Ebelthite (United Kingdom) J Murray	2	6^{2}
WC	(Finland) J Paukku (Finland) Herkko Pöllänen	6	1	[2]
WC	(Finland) H Heliövaara (Finland) J Nieminen	4	6	[10]
3	(Germany) F Moser (Germany) S Stadler	6	6
(Poland) T Bednarek (Poland) M Kowalczyk	4	2
(Sweden) J Brunström (Australia) R Junaid	6	6^{5}	[5]
(Belarus) U Ignatik (Chinese Taipei) J Wang	3	7^{7}	[10]
(Australia) J Kerr (Sweden) A Siljeström	7	2	[8]
(Germany) B Becker (Germany) P Petzschner	5	6	[10]
(United States) J Cerretani (Canada) A Shamasdin	1	3
4	(Russia) M Elgin (Slovakia) I Zelenay	6	6
(Germany) P Marx (Romania) F Mergea	6	7^{7}
WC	(Russia) E Donskoy (Russia) Alexander Rumyantsev	3	6^{4}
(Slovakia) K Beck (Czech Republic) J Hájek	3	1
2	(Germany) D Brown (Germany) M Kohlmann	6	6

Quarterfinals
1	(Czech Republic) L Dlouhý (Slovakia) M Mertiňák	6	5	[11]
WC	(Finland) H Heliövaara (Finland) J Nieminen	3	7	[9]
3	(Germany) F Moser (Germany) S Stadler	4	6	[6]
(Belarus) U Ignatik (Chinese Taipei) J Wang	6	3	[10]
(Germany) B Becker (Germany) P Petzschner	6^{3}	6	[6]
4	(Russia) M Elgin (Slovakia) I Zelenay	7^{7}	4	[10]
(Germany) P Marx (Romania) F Mergea	6	6
2	(Germany) D Brown (Germany) M Kohlmann	2	3

Semifinals
1	(Czech Republic) L Dlouhý (Slovakia) M Mertiňák	4	4
(Belarus) U Ignatik (Chinese Taipei) J Wang	6	6
4	(Russia) M Elgin (Slovakia) I Zelenay	6	4	[10]
(Germany) P Marx (Romania) F Mergea	4	6	[5]

Final
(Belarus) U Ignatik (Chinese Taipei) J Wang	6	6^{0}	[4]
4	(Russia) M Elgin (Slovakia) I Zelenay	4	7^{7}	[10]
