= 2010 IPP Open =

Coordinates: 60°12′47.3″N 24°52′32.6″E

- Date: 22–28 November
- Edition: 10th
- Location: Helsinki, Finland

Champions

Singles
- (Lithuania) Ričardas Berankis

Doubles
- (Germany) Dustin Brown / (Germany) Martin Emmrich
← 2009 ·	IPP Open	· 2011 →

The 2010 IPP Open was a professional tennis tournament played on indoor carpet courts. It was the tenth edition of the tournament which was part of the 2010 ATP Challenger Tour. It took place in Helsinki, Finland between 22 and 28 November 2010.

== ATP entrants ==
=== Seeds ===
Country	Player	Rank^{1}	Seed
GER	Tobias Kamke	67	1
POL	Michał Przysiężny	76	2
RUS	Teymuraz Gabashvili	82	3
GER	Dustin Brown	93	4
SVK	~~Karol Beck~~	~~96~~	~~5~~
FRA	Adrian Mannarino	99	6
ITA	Simone Bolelli	104	7
IND	~~Somdev Devvarman~~	~~105~~	~~8~~
SVN	Blaž Kavčič	108	9

- Rankings are as of November 15, 2010.

=== Other entrants ===
The following players received wildcards into the singles main draw:

- (Serbia) Marko Djokovic
- (France) Antony Dupuis
- (Finland) Henri Kontinen
- (Finland) Micke Kontinen

The following players received a Special exempt into the singles main draw:

- (Slovakia) Martin Kližan
- (Russia) Alexander Kudryavtsev

The following players received entry from the qualifying draw:

- (Belgium) Ruben Bemelmans
- (Russia) Mikhail Elgin
- (Germany) Jan-Lennard Struff
- (Estonia) Jürgen Zopp

The following players received the lucky loser spots:

- (Romania) Petru-Alexandru Luncanu
- (Finland) Timo Nieminen

== Champions ==
=== Singles ===
(Lithuania) Ričardas Berankis def. (Poland) Michał Przysiężny, 6–1, 2–0, RET.

=== Doubles ===
(Germany) Dustin Brown / (Germany) Martin Emmrich def. (Finland) Henri Kontinen / (Finland) Jarkko Nieminen, 7–6(17), 0–6, [10–7]
