= 2010 IPP Open – Doubles =

Doubles
- 2010 IPP Open

Final
- Champions: (Germany) Dustin Brown (Germany) Martin Emmrich
- Runners-up: (Finland) Henri Kontinen (Finland) Jarkko Nieminen
- Score: 7–6(17), 0–6, [10–7]

Events
Singles	Doubles
- IPP Open

Rohan Bopanna and Aisam-ul-Haq Qureshi were the defending champions, but were ineligible compete this year, due to the ATP rules.
Dustin Brown and Martin Emmrich won in the final 7–6(17), 0–6, [10–7], against Henri Kontinen and Jarkko Nieminen.

== Seeds ==
1. (Sweden) Johan Brunström / (United Kingdom) Ken Skupski (quarterfinals)
2. (Germany) Michael Kohlmann / (Austria) Alexander Peya (quarterfinals)
3. (Poland) Tomasz Bednarek / (Slovakia) Igor Zelenay (semifinals)
4. (Czech Republic) Leoš Friedl / (Czech Republic) David Škoch (semifinals)

== Draw ==
Key

- Q = Qualifier
- WC = Wild card
- LL = Lucky loser
- Alt = Alternate
- ITF = ITF entry
- PR = Protected ranking
- SR = Special ranking
- SE = Special exempt
- JE = Junior exempt
- JR = Junior Accelerator Programme entrant
- CO = College Accelerator Programme entrant
- NG = Next Gen Accelerator Program entrant
- w/o = Walkover
- r = Retired
- d = Defaulted

=== Draw ===
First round
1	(Sweden) J Brunström (United Kingdom) K Skupski	7	7
WC	(Finland) M Kontinen (Denmark) F Nielsen	6^{1}	6^{4}
(Germany) D Brown (Germany) M Emmrich	6	6
(United States) B Battistone (Sweden) A Siljeström	3	4
3	(Poland) T Bednarek (Slovakia) I Zelenay	6	6
WC	(Serbia) M Djokovic (France) A Dupuis	2	2
(Austria) S Koubek (Austria) M Slanar	2	3
(Russia) M Elgin (Russia) T Gabashvili	6	6
(Germany) A Begemann (Germany) F Moser	4	7	[10]
(Poland) M Kowalczyk (Croatia) L Zovko	6	6^{5}	[2]
(United Kingdom) J Delgado (United Kingdom) J Marray	6^{0}	3
4	(Czech Republic) L Friedl (Czech Republic) D Škoch	7	6
(Russia) A Kudryavtsev (Poland) M Przysiężny	3	3
WC	(Finland) H Kontinen (Finland) J Nieminen	6	6
(Latvia) A Juška (Germany) P Marx	4	6^{5}
2	(Germany) M Kohlmann (Austria) A Peya	6	7

Quarterfinals
1	(Sweden) J Brunström (United Kingdom) K Skupski	4	6	[5]
(Germany) D Brown (Germany) M Emmrich	6	3	[10]
3	(Poland) T Bednarek (Slovakia) I Zelenay	6	5	[10]
(Russia) M Elgin (Russia) T Gabashvili	2	7	[8]
(Poland) M Kowalczyk (Croatia) L Zovko	6	3	[5]
4	(Czech Republic) L Friedl (Czech Republic) D Škoch	3	6	[10]
WC	(Finland) H Kontinen (Finland) J Nieminen	7	6^{2}	[11]
2	(Germany) M Kohlmann (Austria) A Peya	5	7	[9]

Semifinals
(Germany) D Brown (Germany) M Emmrich	6	6
3	(Poland) T Bednarek (Slovakia) I Zelenay	4	4
4	(Czech Republic) L Friedl (Czech Republic) D Škoch	2	4
WC	(Finland) H Kontinen (Finland) J Nieminen	6	6

Final
(Germany) D Brown (Germany) M Emmrich	7	0	[10]
WC	(Finland) H Kontinen (Finland) J Nieminen	6^{7}	6	[7]
