= 2010 IPP Open – Singles =

Singles
- 2010 IPP Open

Final
- Champion: (Lithuania) Ričardas Berankis
- Runner-up: (Poland) Michał Przysiężny
- Score: 6–1, 2–0, RET.

Events
Singles	Doubles
← 2009 ·	IPP Open	· 2011 →

Michał Przysiężny was the defending champion, but had to retire in the final. As a result, Ričardas Berankis won this tournament.

== Seeds ==
1. (Germany) Tobias Kamke (first round)
2. (Poland) Michał Przysiężny (final)
3. (Russia) Teymuraz Gabashvili (first round)
4. (Germany) Dustin Brown (second round)
5. (Slovakia) ~~Karol Beck~~ (withdrew)
6. (France) Adrian Mannarino (semifinals)
7. (Italy) Simone Bolelli (first round)
8. (India) ~~Somdev Devvarman~~ (withdrew)
9. (Slovenia) Blaž Kavčič (second round)

== Draw ==
=== Key ===
- Q = Qualifier
- WC = Wild card
- LL = Lucky loser
- Alt = Alternate
- SE = Special exempt
- PR = Protected ranking
- ITF = ITF entry
- JE = Junior exempt
- w/o = Walkover
- r = Retired
- d = Defaulted
- SR = Special ranking

=== Finals ===
Semifinals
(Bulgaria) Grigor Dimitrov	6^{5}	6	1
(Lithuania) Ričardas Berankis	7	0	6
6	(France) Adrian Mannarino	3	1
2	(Poland) Michał Przysiężny	6	6

Final
(Lithuania) Ričardas Berankis	6	2
2	(Poland) Michał Przysiężny	1	0^{r}

=== Top half ===
First round
1	(Germany) T Kamke	6^{4}	5
(Bulgaria) G Dimitrov	7	7
(Russia) K Kravchuk	6	6
SE	(Russia) A Kudryavtsev	4	1
(United States) K Kim	5	5
(Germany) J Reister	7	7
SE	(Slovakia) M Kližan	6	6
LL	(Romania) P-A Luncanu	3	2
3	(Russia) T Gabashvili	3	2
(Lithuania) R Berankis	6	6
(Spain) I Navarro	3	4
(France) É Roger-Vasselin	6	6
WC	(France) A Dupuis	1	2
(Canada) F Dancevic	6	6
(Russia) I Kunitsyn	7	6
7	(Italy) S Bolelli	5	1

Second round
(Bulgaria) G Dimitrov	6	5	7
(Russia) K Kravchuk	3	7	5
(Germany) J Reister	6	6
SE	(Slovakia) M Kližan	2	3
(Lithuania) R Berankis	3	7	7
(France) É Roger-Vasselin	6	5	6^{2}
(Canada) F Dancevic	6	6
(Russia) I Kunitsyn	4	4

Quarterfinals
(Bulgaria) G Dimitrov	7	3	6
(Germany) J Reister	6^{5}	6	1
(Lithuania) R Berankis	6	6
(Canada) F Dancevic	4	2

Semifinals
(Bulgaria) G Dimitrov	6^{5}	6	1
(Lithuania) R Berankis	7	0	6

=== Bottom half ===
First round
6	(France) A Mannarino	3	6	7
(Austria) S Koubek	6	1	5
WC	(Finland) M Kontinen	6	6
Q	(Russia) M Elgin	4	2
(United States) R Harrison	6^{5}	2
WC	(Finland) H Kontinen	7	6
WC	(Serbia) M Djokovic	7	5	3
4	(Germany) D Brown	6^{7}	7	6
9	(Slovenia) B Kavčič	7	6
(Croatia) F Škugor	5	3
Q	(Belgium) R Bemelmans	4	4
Q	(Estonia) J Zopp	6	6
(Germany) D Gremelmayr	6	6
Q	(Germany) J-L Struff	4	1
LL	(Finland) T Nieminen	6	2	4
2	(Poland) M Przysiężny	3	6	6

Second round
6	(France) A Mannarino	6	6
WC	(Finland) M Kontinen	3	3
WC	(Finland) H Kontinen	6	6
4	(Germany) D Brown	3	1
9	(Slovenia) B Kavčič	4	5
Q	(Estonia) J Zopp	6	7
(Germany) D Gremelmayr	6	2	6^{2}
2	(Poland) M Przysiężny	4	6	7

Quarterfinals
6	(France) A Mannarino	7	5	6
WC	(Finland) H Kontinen	6^{4}	7	3
Q	(Estonia) J Zopp	3	2
2	(Poland) M Przysiężny	6	6

Semifinals
6	(France) A Mannarino	3	1
2	(Poland) M Przysiężny	6	6
