= 2012 IPP Open =

- Date: 12–18 November
- Edition: 12th
- Surface: Hard
- Location: Helsinki, Finland

Champions

Singles
- (Slovakia) Lukáš Lacko

Doubles
- (Russia) Mikhail Elgin / (Slovakia) Igor Zelenay
← 2011 ·	IPP Open	· 2013 →

The 2012 IPP Open was a professional tennis tournament played on hard courts. It was the 12th edition of the tournament which was part of the 2012 ATP Challenger Tour. It took place in Helsinki, Finland between 12 and 18 November 2012.

== Singles main-draw entrants ==
=== Seeds ===
Country	Player	Rank^{1}	Seed
FIN	Jarkko Nieminen	47	1
SVK	Lukáš Lacko	57	2
GER	Benjamin Becker	79	3
LTU	Ričardas Berankis	92	4
ISR	Dudi Sela	100	5
GER	Philipp Petzschner	107	6
GER	Matthias Bachinger	108	7
CZE	Jan Hájek	109	8

- ^{1} Rankings are as of November 5, 2012.

=== Other entrants ===
The following players received wildcards into the singles main draw:

- (Russia) Evgeny Donskoy
- (Finland) Harri Heliövaara
- (Finland) Jarkko Nieminen
- (Russia) Alexander Rumyantsev

The following players received entry from the qualifying draw:

- (Latvia) Andis Juška
- (Germany) Tim Pütz
- (Sweden) Andreas Vinciguerra
- (Belarus) Dzmitry Zhyrmont

The following players received entry into the singles main draw as a lucky loser:

- (Kazakhstan) Evgeny Korolev

== Champions ==
=== Singles ===
- (Slovakia) Lukáš Lacko def. (Finland) Jarkko Nieminen, 6–3, 6–4

=== Doubles ===
- (Russia) Mikhail Elgin / (Slovakia) Igor Zelenay def. (Belarus) Uladzimir Ignatik / (Chinese Taipei) Jimmy Wang, 4–6, 7–6^{(7–0)}, [10–4]
