= 2009 IPP Open – Doubles =

Doubles
- 2009 IPP Open

Final
- Champions: (India) Rohan Bopanna (Pakistan) Aisam-ul-Haq Qureshi
- Runners-up: (Finland) Henri Kontinen (Finland) Jarkko Nieminen
- Score: 6–2, 7–6(7)

Events
| Singles | Doubles |
| ← 2008 · | IPP Open | · 2010 → |

Łukasz Kubot and Oliver Marach, who were the defending champions, decided to not compete this year.
Rohan Bopanna and Aisam-ul-Haq Qureshi defeated Henri Kontinen and Jarkko Nieminen 6–2, 7–6(7) in the final.

== Seeds ==
1. (United Kingdom) Ross Hutchins / (Romania) Horia Tecău (first round)
2. (United Kingdom) Colin Fleming / (United Kingdom) Ken Skupski (quarterfinals)
3. (India) Rohan Bopanna / (Pakistan) Aisam-ul-Haq Qureshi (champions)
4. (Czech Republic) Leoš Friedl / (Czech Republic) David Škoch (quarterfinals)

== Draw ==
=== Key ===
- Q = Qualifier
- WC = Wild card
- LL = Lucky loser
- Alt = Alternate
- SE = Special exempt
- PR = Protected ranking
- ITF = ITF entry
- JE = Junior exempt
- w/o = Walkover
- r = Retired
- d = Defaulted
- SR = Special ranking

=== Draw ===
First round
1 | (United Kingdom) R Hutchins (Romania) H Tecău | 6^{10} | 3
WC | (Finland) H Kontinen (Finland) J Nieminen | 7 | 6
(Australia) R Junaid (Italy) A Motti | 6 | 6
(Spain) I Navarro (Austria) M Slanar | 4 | 4
4 | (Czech Republic) L Friedl (Czech Republic) D Škoch | 6 | 2 | [10]
WC | (Finland) H Heliövaara (Finland) H Laaksonen | 1 | 6 | [6]
(Germany) P Marx (Slovakia) I Zelenay | 7 | 6^{2} | [10]
(United Kingdom) J Marray (Australia) J Sirianni | 6^{6} | 7 | [6]
(Germany) F Moser (Netherlands) R Wassen | 6 | 6
(Thailand) Sa Ratiwatana (Thailand) So Ratiwatana | 3 | 2
(Italy) D Bracciali (Croatia) L Zovko | 5 | 6 | [6]
3 | (India) R Bopanna (Pakistan) A-u-H Qureshi | 7 | 2 | [10]
WC | (Russia) I Belyaev (Russia) E Donskoy | 4 | 3
(Slovakia) K Beck (Czech Republic) J Krkoška | 6 | 6
(Israel) H Levy (Russia) D Sitak | 3 | 2
2 | (United Kingdom) C Fleming (United Kingdom) K Skupski | 6 | 6

Quarterfinals
WC | (Finland) H Kontinen (Finland) J Nieminen | 6 | 6
(Australia) R Junaid (Italy) A Motti | 3 | 4
4 | (Czech Republic) L Friedl (Czech Republic) D Škoch | 5 | 7 | [7]
(Germany) P Marx (Slovakia) I Zelenay | 7 | 6^{5} | [10]
(Germany) F Moser (Netherlands) R Wassen | 6^{2} | 4
3 | (India) R Bopanna (Pakistan) A-u-H Qureshi | 7 | 6
(Slovakia) K Beck (Czech Republic) J Krkoška | 7 | 4 | [10]
2 | (United Kingdom) C Fleming (United Kingdom) K Skupski | 6^{2} | 6 | [6]

Semifinals
WC | (Finland) H Kontinen (Finland) J Nieminen | 3 | 6 | [10]
(Germany) P Marx (Slovakia) I Zelenay | 6 | 4 | [8]
3 | (India) R Bopanna (Pakistan) A-u-H Qureshi | 3 | 7 | [10]
(Slovakia) K Beck (Czech Republic) J Krkoška | 6 | 5 | [3]

Final
WC | (Finland) H Kontinen (Finland) J Nieminen | 2 | 6^{7}
3 | (India) R Bopanna (Pakistan) A-u-H Qureshi | 6 | 7
