= 2011 IPP Open – Doubles =

Doubles
- 2011 IPP Open

Final
- Champions: (Germany) Martin Emmrich (Sweden) Andreas Siljeström
- Runners-up: (United States) James Cerretani (Slovakia) Michal Mertiňák
- Score: 6–4, 6–4

Events
Singles	Doubles
- IPP Open

Dustin Brown and Martin Emmrich were the defending champions but decided not to participate together.
Brown plays alongside Michael Kohlmann, while Emmrich partners up with Andreas Siljeström.
They went on to win the title after defeating James Cerretani and Michal Mertiňák 6–4, 6–4 in the final.

== Seeds ==
1. (United States) James Cerretani / (Slovakia) Michal Mertiňák (final)
2. (Germany) Dustin Brown / (Germany) Michael Kohlmann (semifinals)
3. (Germany) Philipp Marx / (Germany) Frank Moser (first round)
4. (United Kingdom) Jamie Delgado / (United Kingdom) Jonathan Marray (quarterfinals)

== Draw ==
Key

- Q = Qualifier
- WC = Wild card
- LL = Lucky loser
- Alt = Alternate
- ITF = ITF entry
- PR = Protected ranking
- SR = Special ranking
- SE = Special exempt
- JE = Junior exempt
- JR = Junior Accelerator Programme entrant
- CO = College Accelerator Programme entrant
- NG = Next Gen Accelerator Program entrant
- w/o = Walkover
- r = Retired
- d = Defaulted

=== Draw ===
First round
1	(United States) J Cerretani (Slovakia) M Mertiňák	6	6
WC	(Switzerland) G Bastl (Serbia) M Djokovic	2	1
(Poland) T Bednarek (United States) T Parrott	4	7^{9}	[8]
(Germany) A Waske (Slovakia) I Zelenay	6	6^{7}	[10]
4	(United Kingdom) J Delgado (United Kingdom) J Marray	6^{3}	7^{7}	[10]
(France) K de Schepper (France) S Robert	7^{7}	6^{4}	[4]
WC	(Finland) M Kontinen (Finland) T Nieminen	6	6
(France) A Mannarino (France) B Paire	2	4
(Russia) M Elgin (Uzbekistan) D Istomin	6^{8}	2
(Germany) M Emmrich (Sweden) A Siljeström	7^{10}	6
WC	(Finland) H Heliövaara (Ukraine) D Molchanov	6	6
3	(Germany) P Marx (Germany) F Moser	4	4
(Australia) M Ebden (Estonia) J Zopp	4	7^{7}	[3]
(Sweden) J Brunström (United Kingdom) K Skupski	6	6^{3}	[10]
(Romania) A Ungur (Argentina) H Zeballos
2	(Germany) D Brown (Germany) M Kohlmann	w/o

Quarterfinals
1	(United States) J Cerretani (Slovakia) M Mertiňák	6	6
(Germany) A Waske (Slovakia) I Zelenay	3	3
4	(United Kingdom) J Delgado (United Kingdom) J Marray	3	4
WC	(Finland) M Kontinen (Finland) T Nieminen	6	6
(Germany) M Emmrich (Sweden) A Siljeström	6	6
WC	(Finland) H Heliövaara (Ukraine) D Molchanov	3	2
(Sweden) J Brunström (United Kingdom) K Skupski	6^{3}	7	[6]
2	(Germany) D Brown (Germany) M Kohlmann	7^{7}	5	[10]

Semifinals
1	(United States) J Cerretani (Slovakia) M Mertiňák	7^{7}	6
WC	(Finland) M Kontinen (Finland) T Nieminen	6^{2}	2
(Germany) M Emmrich (Sweden) A Siljeström	6	6
2	(Germany) D Brown (Germany) M Kohlmann	4	3

Final
1	(United States) J Cerretani (Slovakia) M Mertiňák	4	4
(Germany) M Emmrich (Sweden) A Siljeström	6	6
