= 2009 IPP Open – Singles =

Singles
- 2009 IPP Open

Final
- Champion: (Poland) Michał Przysiężny
- Runner-up: (Switzerland) Stéphane Bohli
- Score: 4–6, 6–4, 6–1

Events
| Singles | Doubles |
| ← 2008 · | IPP Open | · 2010 → |

Dmitry Tursunov was the defending champion; however, he didn't play this year.
Qualifier Michał Przysiężny won this tournament, after defeating Stéphane Bohli 4–6, 6–4, 6–1 in the final.

== Seeds ==
1. (Finland) Jarkko Nieminen (quarterfinals)
2. (Slovakia) Karol Beck (quarterfinals)
3. (Germany) Björn Phau (first round)
4. (United States) Kevin Kim (first round)
5. (Israel) Harel Levy (first round)
6. (Spain) Iván Navarro (second round)
7. (Germany) Michael Berrer (first round)
8. (Austria) Stefan Koubek (second round)

== Draw ==
=== Key ===
- Q = Qualifier
- WC = Wild card
- LL = Lucky loser
- Alt = Alternate
- SE = Special exempt
- PR = Protected ranking
- ITF = ITF entry
- JE = Junior exempt
- w/o = Walkover
- r = Retired
- d = Defaulted
- SR = Special ranking

=== Finals ===
Semifinals
WC | (Finland) Henri Kontinen | 7 | 4 | 6^{5}
(Switzerland) Stéphane Bohli | 5 | 6 | 7
Q | (Netherlands) Robin Haase | 6^{5} | 6^{5}
Q | (Poland) Michał Przysiężny | 7 | 7

Final
(Switzerland) Stéphane Bohli | 6 | 4 | 1
Q | (Poland) Michał Przysiężny | 4 | 6 | 6

=== Top half ===
First round
1 | (Finland) J Nieminen | 6 | 6
(Romania) P-A Luncanu | 2 | 2
(Belgium) R Bemelmans | 6 | 6^{5} | 6
WC | (France) A Dupuis | 1 | 7 | 2
(Germany) J Reister | 7 | 6
(Czech Republic) J Minář | 5 | 4
WC | (Finland) H Kontinen | 7 | 4 | 7
7 | (Germany) M Berrer | 5 | 6 | 6^{6}
3 | (Germany) B Phau | 4 | 6 | 4
(United Kingdom) D Evans | 6 | 1 | 6
(Croatia) A Veić | 6 | 7
Q | (Russia) I Belyaev | 3 | 5
(United Kingdom) A Bogdanovic | 6^{0} | 4
(Switzerland) S Bohli | 7 | 6
Q | (Pakistan) A-u-H Qureshi | 3 | 2
8 | (Austria) S Koubek | 6 | 6

Second round
1 | (Finland) J Nieminen | 6 | 1 | 6
(Belgium) R Bemelmans | 4 | 6 | 1
(Germany) J Reister | 6^{6} | 3
WC | (Finland) H Kontinen | 7 | 6
(United Kingdom) D Evans | 1 | 6 | 6^{1}
(Croatia) A Veić | 6 | 2 | 7
(Switzerland) S Bohli | 6 | 1 | 6
8 | (Austria) S Koubek | 2 | 6 | 3

Quarterfinals
1 | (Finland) J Nieminen | 6^{0} | 4
WC | (Finland) H Kontinen | 7 | 6
(Croatia) A Veić | 2 | 1
(Switzerland) S Bohli | 6 | 6

Semifinals
WC | (Finland) H Kontinen | 7 | 4 | 6^{5}
(Switzerland) S Bohli | 5 | 6 | 7

=== Bottom half ===
First round
6 | (Spain) I Navarro | 6 | 4 | 6
(Romania) A Ungur | 4 | 6 | 4
Q | (Netherlands) R Haase | 6 | 6
(Slovakia) K Čapkovič | 2 | 2
(Belgium) N Desein | 7 | 7
(Czech Republic) L Rosol | 6^{4} | 6^{7}
(Jamaica) D Brown | 6 | 6
4 | (United States) K Kim | 2 | 2
5 | (Israel) H Levy | 3 | 3
Q | (Poland) M Przysiężny | 6 | 6
ALT | (Russia) E Kirillov | 7 | 6
WC | (Finland) H Laaksonen | 5 | 2
(Israel) N Okun | 4 | 0 | r
(Germany) T Kamke | 6 | 1
WC | (Russia) E Donskoy | 3 | 6^{4}
2 | (Slovakia) K Beck | 6 | 7

Second round
6 | (Spain) I Navarro | 3 | 6 | 3
Q | (Netherlands) R Haase | 6 | 4 | 6
(Belgium) N Desein | 6 | 6
(Jamaica) D Brown | 4 | 2
Q | (Poland) M Przysiężny | 6 | 6
ALT | (Russia) E Kirillov | 1 | 2
(Germany) T Kamke | 6 | 3 | 6^{2}
2 | (Slovakia) K Beck | 4 | 6 | 7

Quarterfinals
Q | (Netherlands) R Haase | 6 | 4 | 7
(Belgium) N Desein | 4 | 6 | 6^{5}
Q | (Poland) M Przysiężny | 6 | 6
2 | (Slovakia) K Beck | 3 | 1

Semifinals
Q | (Netherlands) R Haase | 6^{5} | 6^{5}
Q | (Poland) M Przysiężny | 7 | 7
