= 2016 TAC Cup Nanjing Challenger =

- Date: 18–24 April
- Edition: 1st
- Draw: 32S / 16D
- Prize money: $50,000+H
- Surface: Clay
- Location: Nanjing, China

Champions

Singles
- (Lithuania) Ričardas Berankis

Doubles
- (India) Saketh Myneni / (India) Jeevan Nedunchezhiyan
TAC Cup Nanjing Challenger	· 2017 →

The 2016 TAC Cup Nanjing Challenger was a professional tennis tournament played on clay courts. It was the sixth edition of the tournament which was part of the 2016 ATP Challenger Tour. It took place in Nanjing, China between 18 and 24 April 2016.

== Singles main-draw entrants ==
=== Seeds ===
Country	Player	Rank^{1}	Seed
LTU	Ričardas Berankis	80	1
JPN	Yoshihito Nishioka	103	2
BRA	Jordan Thompson	119	3
IND	Saketh Myneni	151	4
CHN	Wu Di	152	5
USA	Alexander Sarkissian	159	6
CHN	Zhang Ze	167	7
SLO	Grega Žemlja	189	8

- ^{1} Rankings as of 11 April 2016.

=== Other entrants ===
The following players received wildcards into the singles main draw:

- (China) Wang Chuhan
- (China) Zeng Shihong
- (China) Zheng Weiqiang
- (China) Gao Xin

The following players received entry from the qualifying draw:

- (Italy) Riccardo Ghedin
- (Czech Republic) Václav Šafránek
- (Germany) Daniel Masur
- (Australia) Andrew Whittington

== Champions ==
=== Singles ===
- (Lithuania) Ričardas Berankis def. (Slovenia) Grega Žemlja, 6–3, 6–4

=== Doubles ===
- (India) Saketh Myneni / (India) Jeevan Nedunchezhiyan def. (Ukraine) Denys Molchanov / (Kazakhstan) Aleksandr Nedovyesov, 6–3, 6–3
