= 2016 TAC Cup Nanjing Challenger – Singles =

Singles
- 2016 TAC Cup Nanjing Challenger

Final
- Champion: (Lithuania) Ričardas Berankis
- Runner-up: (Slovenia) Grega Žemlja
- Score: 6–3, 6–4

Events
Singles	Doubles
TAC Cup Nanjing Challenger	· 2017 →

This was the first edition of the tournament.

Ričardas Berankis won the title, defeating Grega Žemlja 6–3, 6–4 in the final.

== Seeds ==
1. (Lithuania) Ričardas Berankis (champions)
2. (Japan) Yoshihito Nishioka (first round)
3. (Australia) Jordan Thompson (semifinals)
4. (India) Saketh Myneni (first round)
5. (China) Wu Di (first round)
6. (United States) Alexander Sarkissian (first round, retired)
7. (China) Zhang Ze (second round)
8. (Slovenia) Grega Žemlja (final)

== Draw ==
=== Key ===
- Q = Qualifier
- WC = Wild card
- LL = Lucky loser
- Alt = Alternate
- SE = Special exempt
- PR = Protected ranking
- ITF = ITF entry
- JE = Junior exempt
- w/o = Walkover
- r = Retired
- d = Defaulted
- SR = Special ranking

=== Finals ===
Semifinals
1	(Lithuania) Ričardas Berankis	7^{7}	7
3	(Australia) Jordan Thompson	6^{5}	5
8	(Slovenia) Grega Žemlja	6	6
(Kazakhstan) Aleksandr Nedovyesov	4	4

Final
1	(Lithuania) Ričardas Berankis	6	6
8	(Slovenia) Grega Žemlja	3	4

=== Top half ===
First round
1	(Lithuania) R Berankis	6	6
WC	(China) C Wang	4	3
(China) Y Bai	3	6	6^{3}
(Serbia) D Petrović	6	4	7^{7}
(Colombia) N Barrientos	7	6
WC	(China) Zeng Shihong	5	4
Q	(Italy) R Ghedin	6	3
6	(United States) A Sarkissian	3	0^{r}
3	(Australia) J Thompson	6^{3}	6	7^{8}
(South Korea) D-h Lee	7^{7}	2	6^{6}
Q	(Czech Republic) V Šafránek	6	6
Q	(Germany) D Masur	2	4
(Austria) B Trinker	4	6^{3}
(Chinese Taipei) J Jung	6	7^{7}
(France) M Bourgue	6	6
5	(China) D Wu	2	1

Second round
1	(Lithuania) R Berankis	7^{7}	6
(Serbia) D Petrović	6^{3}	4
(Colombia) N Barrientos	6	6
Q	(Italy) R Ghedin	4	3
3	(Australia) J Thompson	6	5	6
Q	(Czech Republic) V Šafránek	4	7	3
(Chinese Taipei) J Jung	6	6
(France) M Bourgue	4	2

Quarterfinals
1	(Lithuania) R Berankis	1	6	6
(Colombia) N Barrientos	6	4	3
3	(Australia) J Thompson	6	7
(Chinese Taipei) J Jung	3	5

Semifinals
1	(Lithuania) R Berankis	7^{7}	7
3	(Australia) J Thompson	6^{5}	5

=== Bottom half ===
First round
8	(Slovenia) G Žemlja	6	6
(Ukraine) D Molchanov	1	3
(China) Z Li	6	4
(Chinese Taipei) L-c Huang	2	1^{r}
WC	(China) Zheng Weiqiang	3	6^{2}
WC	(China) X Gao	6	7^{7}
(United States) D Nguyen	7^{8}	7^{7}
4	(India) S Myneni	6^{6}	6^{3}
7	(China) Z Zhang	4	6	7
(Australia) M Reid	6	1	5
Q	(Australia) A Whittington	4	6^{4}
(Kazakhstan) A Nedovyesov	6	7^{7}
(United Kingdom) L Broady	2	3
(Belgium) A De Greef	6	6
(Spain) R Ramírez Hidalgo	6	6
2	(Japan) Y Nishioka	1	4

Second round
8	(Slovenia) G Žemlja	6	6^{5}	6
(China) Z Li	1	7^{7}	1
WC	(China) X Gao	5	2
(United States) D Nguyen	7	6
7	(China) Z Zhang	6^{3}	2
(Kazakhstan) A Nedovyesov	7^{7}	6
(Belgium) A De Greef	5	1
(Spain) R Ramírez Hidalgo	7	6

Quarterfinals
8	(Slovenia) G Žemlja	4	7	7^{7}
(United States) D Nguyen	6	5	6^{4}
(Kazakhstan) A Nedovyesov	6	4	6
(Spain) R Ramírez Hidalgo	4	6	4

Semifinals
8	(Slovenia) G Žemlja	6	6
(Kazakhstan) A Nedovyesov	4	4
