= 2012 IPP Open – Singles =

Singles
- 2012 IPP Open

Final
- Champion: (Slovakia) Lukáš Lacko
- Runner-up: (Finland) Jarkko Nieminen
- Score: 6–3, 6–4

Events
Singles	Doubles
- IPP Open

Daniel Brands was the defending champion but decided not to participate.
Lukáš Lacko defeated Jarkko Nieminen 6–3, 6–4 in the final to win the title.

== Seeds ==
1. (Finland) Jarkko Nieminen (final)
2. (Slovakia) Lukáš Lacko (champion)
3. (Germany) Benjamin Becker (semifinals)
4. (Lithuania) Ričardas Berankis (quarterfinals)
5. (Israel) Dudi Sela (quarterfinals)
6. (Germany) Philipp Petzschner (first round)
7. (Germany) Matthias Bachinger (second round)
8. (Czech Republic) Jan Hájek (first round)

== Draw ==
Key

- Q = Qualifier
- WC = Wild card
- LL = Lucky loser
- Alt = Alternate
- ITF = ITF entry
- PR = Protected ranking
- SR = Special ranking
- SE = Special exempt
- JE = Junior exempt
- JR = Junior Accelerator Programme entrant
- CO = College Accelerator Programme entrant
- NG = Next Gen Accelerator Program entrant
- w/o = Walkover
- r = Retired
- d = Defaulted

=== Finals ===
Semifinals
1/WC	(Finland) Jarkko Nieminen	6^{4}	6	6
(Germany) Jan-Lennard Struff	7^{7}	4	2
3	(Germany) Benjamin Becker	3	7^{7}	4
2	(Slovakia) Lukáš Lacko	6	6^{5}	6

Final
1/WC	(Finland) Jarkko Nieminen	3	4
2	(Slovakia) Lukáš Lacko	6	6

=== Top half ===
First round
1/WC	(Finland) J Nieminen	6	6
WC	(Finland) H Heliövaara	3	1
(United Kingdom) J Goodall	3	2
(Russia) I Kunitsyn	6	6
(Brazil) T Alves	4	1
WC	(Russia) E Donskoy	6	6
(Czech Republic) J Hernych	3	6	3
5	(Israel) D Sela	6	3	6
4	(Lithuania) R Berankis	6	4	6
Q	(Latvia) A Juška	3	6	2
(Chinese Taipei) J Wang	3	5
(Ukraine) I Marchenko	6	7
(Germany) J-L Struff	2	6	6
(Argentina) F Delbonis	6	4	1
(Belgium) R Bemelmans	3	2
7	(Germany) M Bachinger	6	6

Second round
1/WC	(Finland) J Nieminen	6	6
(Russia) I Kunitsyn	2	1
WC	(Russia) E Donskoy	4	5
5	(Israel) D Sela	6	7
4	(Lithuania) R Berankis	7^{7}	6
(Ukraine) I Marchenko	6^{3}	4
(Germany) J-L Struff	2	6	6
7	(Germany) M Bachinger	6	3	2

Quarterfinals
1/WC	(Finland) J Nieminen	6	6
5	(Israel) D Sela	4	2
4	(Lithuania) R Berankis	6^{1}	3
(Germany) J-L Struff	7^{7}	6

Semifinals
1/WC	(Finland) J Nieminen	6^{4}	6	6
(Germany) J-L Struff	7^{7}	4	2

=== Bottom half ===
First round
8	(Czech Republic) J Hájek	5	4
Q	(Germany) Tim Pütz	7	6
(Germany) M Berrer	4	3
(Russia) D Tursunov	6	6
LL	(Kazakhstan) E Korolev	2	2
(France) A Mannarino	6	6
(Ukraine) I Sergeyev	6^{2}	5
3	(Germany) B Becker	7^{7}	7
6	(Germany) P Petzschner	6^{4}	1
(Germany) D Brown	7^{7}	6
Q	(Belarus) D Zhyrmont	6	6
(Slovakia) K Beck	2	4
WC	(Russia) Alexander Rumyantsev	4	4
(Belarus) U Ignatik	6	6
Q	(Sweden) A Vinciguerra	6	6^{5}	4
2	(Slovakia) L Lacko	3	7^{7}	6

Second round
Q	(Germany) T Pütz	6	7
(Russia) D Tursunov	4	5
(France) A Mannarino	5	4
3	(Germany) B Becker	7	6
(Germany) D Brown	6	4	5
Q	(Belarus) D Zhyrmont	4	6	7
(Belarus) U Ignatik	4	4
2	(Slovakia) L Lacko	6	6

Quarterfinals
Q	(Germany) T Pütz	5	4
3	(Germany) B Becker	7	6
Q	(Belarus) D Zhyrmont
2	(Slovakia) L Lacko	6	6

Semifinals
3	(Germany) B Becker	3	7^{7}	4
2	(Slovakia) L Lacko	6	6^{5}	6
