= 2016 TAC Cup Nanjing Challenger – Doubles =

Doubles
- 2016 TAC Cup Nanjing Challenger

Final
- Champion: (India) Saketh Myneni (India) Jeevan Nedunchezhiyan
- Runner-up: (Ukraine) Denys Molchanov (Kazakhstan) Aleksandr Nedovyesov
- Score: 6–3, 6–3

Events
| Singles | Doubles |
| TAC Cup Nanjing Challenger | · 2017 → |

This was the first edition of the tournament.

Saketh Myneni and Jeevan Nedunchezhiyan won the title, defeating Denys Molchanov and Aleksandr Nedovyesov 6–3, 6–3 in the final.

== Seeds ==
1. (China) Gong Maoxin / (Chinese Taipei) Yi Chu-huan (first round)
2. (China) Bai Yan / (Italy) Riccardo Ghedin (semifinals)
3. (India) Saketh Myneni / (India) Jeevan Nedunchezhiyan (champions)
4. (Colombia) Nicolás Barrientos / (Uruguay) Ariel Behar (semifinals)

== Draw ==
=== Key ===
- Q = Qualifier
- WC = Wild card
- LL = Lucky loser
- Alt = Alternate
- SE = Special exempt
- PR = Protected ranking
- ITF = ITF entry
- JE = Junior exempt
- w/o = Walkover
- r = Retired
- d = Defaulted
- SR = Special ranking

First round
1 | (China) M Gong (Chinese Taipei) C-h Yi | 4 | 7 | [7]
(Ukraine) D Molchanov (Kazakhstan) A Nedovyesov | 6 | 5 | [10]
(China) Z Li (China) Z Zhang | 6^{2} | 6 | [7]
(Australia) M Reid (Australia) Gavin van Peperzeel | 7^{7} | 2 | [10]
4 | (Colombia) N Barrientos (Uruguay) A Behar | 6 | 7^{7}
WC | (China) Y Ning (China) Z Qiu | 0 | 6^{4}
(Chinese Taipei) C-p Hsieh (China) D Wu | 4 | 4
(Australia) Jarryd Chaplin (United States) A Sarkissian | 6 | 6
WC | (China) X Gao (China) B Ouyang | 1 | 6 | [7]
(Australia) J Thompson (Australia) A Whittington | 6 | 3 | [10]
(United States) J Cerretani (United States) M Schnur | 1 | 4
3 | (India) S Myneni (India) J Nedunchezhiyan | 6 | 6
WC | (Japan) T Matsui (China) C Wang | 2 | 6 | [7]
(Chinese Taipei) J Jung (Chinese Taipei) H-y Peng | 6 | 4 | [10]
(France) M Bourgue (Belgium) A De Greef | 4 | 0
2 | (China) Y Bai (Italy) R Ghedin | 6 | 6

Quarterfinals
(Ukraine) D Molchanov (Kazakhstan) A Nedovyesov | 6 | 6
(Australia) M Reid (Australia) G van Peperzeel | 2 | 2
4 | (Colombia) N Barrientos (Uruguay) A Behar | 6 | 6
(Australia) J Chaplin (United States) A Sarkissian | 4 | 4
(Australia) J Thompson (Australia) A Whittington | 1 | 2
3 | (India) S Myneni (India) J Nedunchezhiyan | 6 | 6
(Chinese Taipei) J Jung (Chinese Taipei) H-y Peng | 5 | 6^{2}
2 | (China) Y Bai (Italy) R Ghedin | 7 | 7^{7}

Semifinals
(Ukraine) D Molchanov (Kazakhstan) A Nedovyesov | 6 | 7^{7}
4 | (Colombia) N Barrientos (Uruguay) A Behar | 3 | 6^{5}
3 | (India) S Myneni (India) J Nedunchezhiyan | 6 | 6
2 | (China) Y Bai (Italy) R Ghedin | 3 | 2

Final
(Ukraine) D Molchanov (Kazakhstan) A Nedovyesov | 3 | 3
3 | (India) S Myneni (India) J Nedunchezhiyan | 6 | 6
