= 2009 IPP Open =

- Date: 23–29 November
- Edition: 9th
- Location: Helsinki, Finland

Champions

Singles
- (Poland) Michał Przysiężny

Doubles
- (India) Rohan Bopanna / (Pakistan) Aisam-ul-Haq Qureshi
← 2008 ·	IPP Open	· 2010 →

The 2009 IPP Open was a professional tennis tournament played on indoor carpet courts. It was the ninth edition of the tournament which was part of the 2009 ATP Challenger Tour. It took place in Helsinki, Finland between 23 and 29 November 2009.

== ATP entrants ==
=== Seeds ===
Country	Player	Rank^{1}	Seed
FIN	Jarkko Nieminen	84	1
SVK	Karol Beck	90	2
GER	Björn Phau	111	3
USA	Kevin Kim	115	4
ISR	Harel Levy	124	5
ESP	Iván Navarro	125	6
GER	Michael Berrer	127	7
AUT	Stefan Koubek	142	8

- Rankings are as of November 16, 2009.

=== Other entrants ===
The following players received wildcards into the singles main draw:

- (Russia) Evgeny Donskoy
- (France) Antony Dupuis
- (Finland) Henri Kontinen
- (Finland) Henri Laaksonen

The following players received entry from the qualifying draw:

- (Russia) Ilya Belyaev
- (Netherlands) Robin Haase
- (Poland) Michał Przysiężny
- (Pakistan) Aisam-ul-Haq Qureshi

== Champions ==
=== Singles ===
(Poland) Michał Przysiężny def. (Switzerland) Stéphane Bohli, 4–6, 6–4, 6–1

=== Doubles ===
(India) Rohan Bopanna / (Pakistan) Aisam-ul-Haq Qureshi def. (Finland) Henri Kontinen / (Finland) Jarkko Nieminen, 6–2, 7–6(7)
