= 2011 IPP Open =

Professional tennis tournament

- Date: 21–27 November
- Edition: 11th
- Location: Helsinki, Finland

Champions

Singles
- (Germany) Daniel Brands

Doubles
- (Germany) Martin Emmrich / (Sweden) Andreas Siljeström
- IPP Open

The 2011 IPP Open was a professional tennis tournament played on hard courts. It was the eleventh edition of the tournament which is part of the 2011 ATP Challenger Tour. It took place in Helsinki, Finland between 21 and 27 November 2011.

== ATP entrants ==
=== Seeds ===
Country	Player	Rank^{1}	Seed
UZB	Denis Istomin	72	1
FIN	Jarkko Nieminen	78	2
FRA	Adrian Mannarino	82	3
AUS	Matthew Ebden	86	4
SVK	Martin Kližan	90	5
SVK	Karol Beck	96	6
GER	Michael Berrer	106	7
FRA	Stéphane Robert	107	8

- ^{1} Rankings are as of November 14, 2011.

=== Other entrants ===
The following players received wildcards into the singles main draw:

- (Serbia) Marko Djokovic
- (Finland) Harri Heliövaara
- (Finland) Micke Kontinen
- (Finland) Herkko Pöllänen

The following players received entry as a special exempt into the singles main draw:

- (Canada) Frank Dancevic

The following players received entry from the qualifying draw:

- (Argentina) Federico Delbonis
- (Russia) Mikhail Elgin
- (Slovakia) Andrej Martin
- (Finland) Timo Nieminen

The following players received entry as a lucky loser into the singles main draw:

- (Germany) Jan-Lennard Struff
- (Germany) Mischa Zverev

== Champions ==
=== Singles ===
(Germany) Daniel Brands def. (Germany) Matthias Bachinger 7–6^{(7–2)}, 7–6^{(7–5)}

=== Doubles ===
(Germany) Martin Emmrich / (Sweden) Andreas Siljeström def. (United States) James Cerretani / (Slovakia) Michal Mertiňák, 6–4, 6–4
