= TAC Cup Nanjing Challenger =

- 2016 TAC Cup Nanjing Challenger

ATP Challenger Tour
- Location: Nanjing, China
- Category: ATP Challenger Tour
- Surface: Clay / Outdoors
- Draw: 32S/32Q/16D
- Prize money: $50,000+H

The TAC Cup Nanjing Challenger was a tennis tournament held in Nanjing, China in 2016. The event was part of the ATP Challenger Tour and was played on outdoor clay courts.

== Past finals ==
=== Singles ===
| Year | Champion | Runner-up | Score | Ref. |
|---|---|---|---|---|
| 2016 | (Lithuania) Ričardas Berankis | (Slovenia) Grega Žemlja | 6–3, 6–4 | |

=== Doubles ===
| Year | Champions | Runners-up | Score | Ref. |
|---|---|---|---|---|
| 2016 | (India) Saketh Myneni (India) Jeevan Nedunchezhiyan | (Ukraine) Denys Molchanov (Kazakhstan) Aleksandr Nedovyesov | 6–3, 6–3 | |
