= Ričardas Berankis =

Lithuanian tennis player

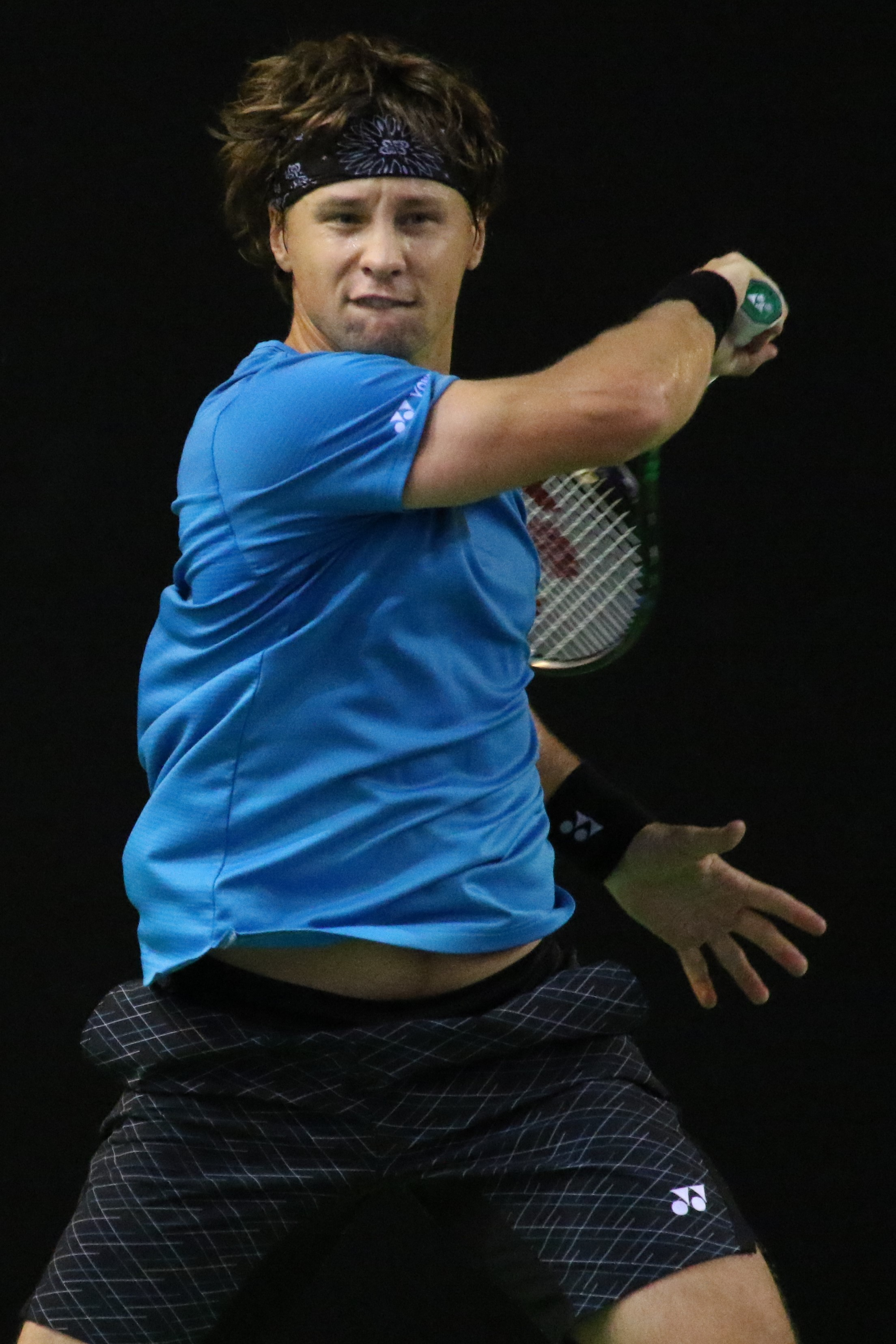
- Berankis in 2021
- Country (sports): Lithuania
- Residence: Bradenton, Florida, United States
- Born: 21 June 1990 (age 36) Vilnius, Lithuania
- Height: 1.75 m (5 ft 9 in)
- Turned pro: 2007
- Retired: 9 December 2025
- Plays: Right-handed (two-handed backhand)
- Coach: Vadim Pinko (2024-), Dirk Hordorff, (-2023); Alexander Peya (2021 )
- Prize money: US $4,863,335

Singles
- Career record: 135–153
- Career titles: 0
- Highest ranking: No. 50 (23 May 2016)

Grand Slam singles results
- Australian Open: 3R (2011, 2013)
- French Open: 3R (2021)
- Wimbledon: 2R (2010, 2015, 2019, 2022)
- US Open: 3R (2020)

Other tournaments
- Olympic Games: 1R (2016)

Doubles
- Career record: 34–51
- Career titles: 1
- Highest ranking: No. 139 (26 October 2015)

Grand Slam doubles results
- Australian Open: 2R (2021)
- French Open: 2R (2019)
- Wimbledon: 2R (2021)
- US Open: 3R (2021)

Ričardas Berankis (Lithuanian pronunciation: [ˈrʲɪtʃɐrdɐs bʲɛˈrɐŋʲˑkʲɪs]; born June 21, 1990) is a Lithuanian former professional tennis player. He was the first and only Lithuanian to enter the ATP top 50 rankings, making him the highest ranked Lithuanian tennis player of all time. Berankis has reached two singles finals on the ATP World Tour, at the Los Angeles Open in 2012 and at the Kremlin Cup in 2017 and won one doubles title in Houston. He was also a prominent member of the Lithuania Davis Cup team.

== Early years ==
Berankis started playing tennis at the age of two, when his six years older sister Lina took him to her tennis practices. Berankis' first coach was Valdas Adomaitis from Jurbarkas. When Berankis was nine years old he accepted an invitation from Remigijus Balžekas to practise with him at the Šiauliai tennis school (over 200 km from Vilnius). It turned out to be a long-term partnership and friendship.

== Career ==
=== Juniors ===
In 2004, Berankis dominated the U14 circuit of the Tennis Europe Junior Tour, winning six junior events, Leeuwarden, Piešťany, Šiauliai, Köln, and two titles in Armenia. He carried that momentum into the prestigious Tennis Europe Junior Masters, Junior Orange Bowl and Eddie Herr International Tennis Championships titles at the end of the year.

In 2007, Berankis had a successful run on the ITF Junior Circuit. In Majors, Berankis reached the semifinals at the Australian Open, the quarter-finals at Roland Garros, and the semifinals at Wimbledon. Berankis won the US Open Junior title, defeating Jerzy Janowicz in the final. Berankis also won titles at the Canadian Open Junior Championships, the Orange Bowl Tennis Championships, and defended his title at the Yucatán World Cup. As a result, Berankis finished the year as the No. 1 junior in the world.

=== 2007: Pro beginnings ===
In the same year, Berankis won his first (and only) Futures singles title in Albufeira, Portugal. He started the tournament from the qualifying draw and lost only one set in nine matches. Also, 16-year-old Berankis represented Lithuania at the Davis cup third group competition. He won three out of five singles matches in five ties played.

=== 2008–2009: ATP Tour debut ===
Berankis started the 2008 season with futures tournaments in the United States. At the one held in McAllen, Texas, he together with Sergey Betov captured a doubles title. Berankis got several wildcards to qualifying draws of ATP Challenger and World Tour tournaments (including the Miami Masters) but it took some time for him to win one. In April, Berankis qualified for the main draw of Humacao Challenger and reached the second round there. In June, Berankis won the qualification and made his first professional ATP tournament appearance at the 2008 Orange Warsaw Open. There he lost in the first round to World No. 96 Wayne Odesnik, in straight sets.

At the 2008 US Open, Berankis made his first attempt to qualify for a Grand Slam event. In the first round of the qualifying draw, after losing the first set he defeated David Marrero. In the second round, again after losing the first set he defeated Sergiy Stakhovsky, it was Berankis' first victory against a top 100 player in his career. In the final round of the qualifying draw, after winning the first set Berankis lost to Björn Phau and failed to qualify for the main event.

During the 2009 season Berankis mainly played at futures and challenger tournaments. He reached three futures finals in Stuttgart, Istanbul and Santo Domingo, but failed to win one. On the ATP Challenger tour Berankis' best result was reaching the semifinals in Qarshi and in Champaign.

Berankis competed for Lithuania in the 2009 second group of Davis Cup. In the first round tie against Georgia, he played two singles matches against George Khrikadze and Lado Chikhladze and won both of them in straight sets. Lithuania defeated Georgia 3–2 and moved to the second round to face the Slovenian team. In Slovenia, Berankis lost all three of his matches in straight sets. First, he lost to Grega Žemlja, then he together with Vadim Pinko lost a doubles match to Grega Žemlja and Andrej Kračman, on the last day, he lost a dead rubber to Janez Semrajč. Lithuania lost to Slovenia 0–5.

=== 2010: Grand Slam debut at Wimbledon ===
Berankis started the 2010 season by competing at the 2010 SAP Open, where he defeated Robby Ginepri in the first round, 6–7, 6–2, 6–3 and Björn Phau in the second round 7–6, 6–3. In the quarterfinals, he lost to then-world number 11 Fernando Verdasco 6–3, 7–6. Berankis then failed to qualify to the 2010 Delray Beach main draw, losing in the first round in the qualifying draw.

Berankis played for the Lithuanian Davis Cup team at the 2010 Davis Cup Europe/Africa Zone Group II tournament. In the first round, Lithuania played against the British Davis Cup team. Berankis won his first match against Daniel Evans 6–1, 4–6, 7–6, 3–6, 6–3. His second match was against James Ward, whom Berankis defeated 7–6, 6–3, 6–4 and tied the series at 2–2. Lithuania advanced to the second round, winning the series 3–2.

The highest-ranked Lithuanian on the ATP World Tour played in three more Challenger and Futures tournaments before competing in the qualifying draw of the 2010 French Open. Berankis advanced to the third round of qualification, but did not manage to advance to the main draw. In the first round of qualifying, Berankis defeated Reda El Amrani 6–2, 6–4. In the next round Berankis defeated Victor Crivoi 6–2, 3–6, 6–0. In the qualifying match for a spot in the main draw, Berankis lost to Martin Fischer 6–3, 4–6, 5–7.

Berankis won his first ATP Challenger tournament at the 2010 Aegon Trophy. In the first round the Lithuanian defeated Frank Dancevic 7–5, 7–6. In the second round Berankis defeated then-world number 93 Kevin Anderson in straight sets 7–5, 6–4. In the quarter-finals Berankis defeated American Ryan Harrison 6–2, 6–2. In the semi-finals Berankis won over former world number 88 Adrian Mannarino 6–3, 3–6, 6–4. He defeated then-world number 137 Go Soeda in the final 6–4, 6–4.

Berankis played in his first Grand Slam tournament in 2010, the 2010 Wimbledon Championships. He became the first Lithuanian player to reach the Wimbledon main draw with three straight-set victories, including an upset win over Santiago Ventura in the final qualifying round. In the first round of the main draw, Berankis defeated fellow qualifier Carsten Ball 6–2, 6–0, 3–6, 7–6. In the second round Berankis lost to Feliciano López 5–7, 6–4, 3–6, 4–6.

Berankis then competed for the Lithuanian Davis Cup team at the 2010 Davis Cup Europe/Africa Zone Group II tournament. In the second round, Lithuania played against the Irish Davis Cup team. Berankis won his first match against James McGee 6–7, 6–4, 6–4, 6–3. Then he played his doubles match. Berankis' partner was Laurynas Grigelis. They easily defeated James Cluskey and Barry King 6–3, 6–3, 6–4 and ensured the victory for Lithuania. The series ended with the result of 3–2.

After a win in first round against American Michael Yani 6–4, 7–5, Berankis had to retire in his Lexington Challenger second-round match against American Alex Bogomolov Jr., losing 4–6, 3–4. It was later revealed that Berankis had an arm injury.

He had a couple of days of intensive physical training before he went to Canada for the Vancouver Open. In the first round Berankis defeated Andrea Collarini 6–4, 7–5. In the second round he was victorious against Gilles Müller from Luxembourg 6–4, 6–4. In the third round he overcame American Jesse Levine 6–3, 6–4. He defeated another American, Lester Cook, in the semifinal 6–3, 6–3, but lost to Dudi Sela in the final 5–7, 2–6. However, he gained 60 ranking points in the tournament. Berankis would finish his European hard-court warmup by losing in the first round of Binghamton challenger to American Jesse Witten 4–6, 4–6.

After these challengers Berankis decided to compete in the 2010 US Open, where he qualified without dropping a set. Berankis started the Open with a four-set win over American wildcard Ryan Sweeting. After that match Berankis lost an epic five-set encounter against then-world number 13, Jürgen Melzer despite being up a break in the fifth set.

Immediately following the US Open, Berankis flew back to Lithuania where he played with the Lithuanian Davis Cup team against Slovenia. Despite winning his first singles rubber in four sets, and winning another epic five-set match in doubles partnering Grigelis, Berankis would eventually lose his second singles rubber in straight sets as Lithuania lost the match-up 2–3 and Slovenia were promoted.

Berankis would not play again until the start of November because of numerous injuries. Upon his comeback Ricardas decided to go back to the Challenger tour playing in the 2010 Bauer Watertechnology Cup challenger in Eckental and the 2010 Lambertz Open by STAWAG challenger in Aachen, but lost in the first round in both tournaments. After this Berankis would make the quarter-finals of the 2010 Ritro Slovak Open challenger in Bratislava, losing to Stefan Koubek, before going on to win the 2010 IPP Open challenger in Helsinki, beating Michał Przysiężny in the final, to finish the season on a high note, entering the top 100 for the first time and finishing the year at a career-high of 85th in the world, as well as being the youngest player in the top 100.

=== 2011: Major third round on debut at the Australian Open ===
Berankis started the year at the Brisbane International, where he went through the qualifying draw and defeated Arnaud Clément in the first round of the main draw. He lost in the second round to Florian Mayer, in three sets.

At the Australian Open, Berankis had his first direct entry to the main draw of a Grand Slam event. In the first round, he defeated local Marinko Matosevic. In the second round, Berankis won by retirement against then world No. 21 David Nalbandian. He was defeated by David Ferrer in the third round, where Berankis won only five games in three sets.

In February, Berankis played at the SAP Open, where he reached quarterfinals in singles and doubles. In the first two rounds of singles draw Berankis defeated Benjamin Becker and Donald Young, then he lost to the eventual champion Milos Raonic, in two tight sets. Berankis' next tournament was the Regions Morgan Keegan Championships, where he lost to the eventual champion Andy Roddick in the first round, in three sets. In the first round of the Delray Beach International Tennis Championships, he again lost to the eventual champion Juan Martín del Potro, in straight sets.

At the beginning of March, Berankis came back to Europe to represent Lithuania in the Davis Cup tie against Estonia in Tallinn. He won both of his singles matches against Jaak Põldma and Jürgen Zopp, the recent one took 20 games in the fifth set and 3 hours 46 minutes in total to decide the winner. In doubles match Berankis partnering Dovydas Šakinis lost to Jürgen Zopp and Mait Künnap.

Next, he competed at the BNP Paribas Open, where Berankis got a wildcard into his first main draw of a Masters tournament. In the first round, after losing the first set, he defeated Alex Bogomolov Jr. Berankis had to retire in the next round against Fernando Verdasco because of a back problem. This problem started after Berankis skipped post-match procedures and rushed from the Davis cup match to the airport for 36 hours trip from Tallinn to Indian Wells. In the first round of the Sony Ericsson Open, Berankis, after winning the first set and being a break-up in the third one, lost to Feliciano López. After the match Berankis said that his back pain recurred. Berankis' back wasn't fully recovered when problems with groin started, so he had to take some time off tennis and take care of his health.

Berankis came back on court in July, he played three tournaments in United States and faced three first round loses. Firstly, at the Atlanta Tennis Championships he lost to Nicolas Mahut. However, in Atlanta Berankis reached the semifinals in doubles. A week later at the Farmers Classic, Berankis lost to Ryan Harrison, in three sets. At the Legg Mason Tennis Classic, he lost to Marinko Matosevic, in three sets.

At the US Open, Berankis lost in the second round of the qualifying draw and did not participate in the main event. During the rest of the season, he played 8 challengers in Europe, where he reached 4 semifinals and one final. Berankis' best performance was at the Slovak Open where he defeated two top 100 players, Sergiy Stakhovsky and Lukáš Rosol, but in the final he lost to local Lukáš Lacko. During the off-season Berankis played an exhibition match in Lithuania against the Lithuanian No. 2 Laurynas Grigelis. Berankis won the match in three sets.

=== 2012: First ATP final ===
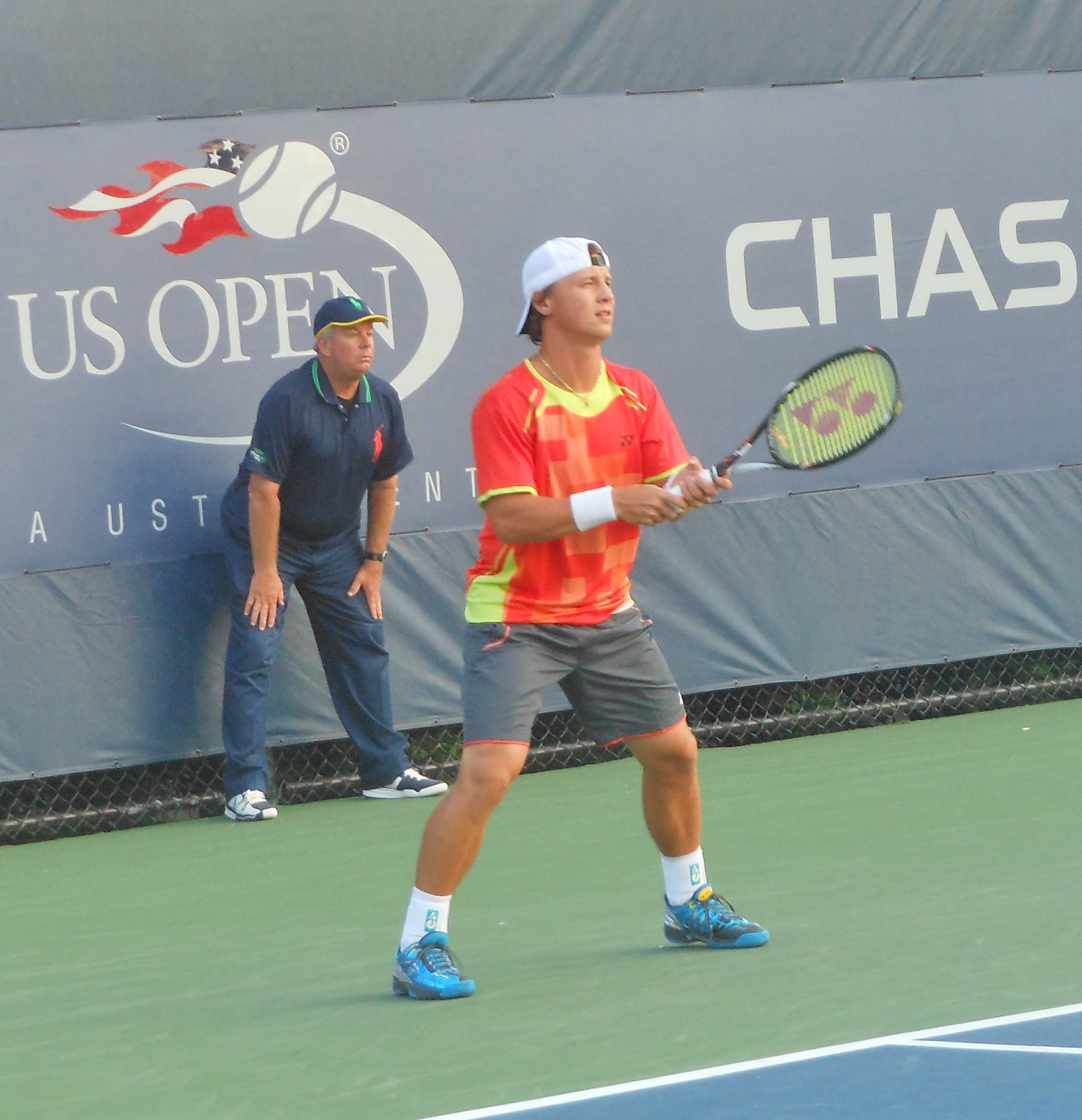
Berankis at the 2012 US Open

Berankis lost in the qualifying rounds of the Brisbane International and the Australian Open. Then, Berankis competed at the Challenger of Dallas, where he lost to Steve Darcis in the quarterfinals. The following week, in the final round of the qualifying draw at the SAP Open Berankis had to retire due to the groin pain. This was not a new problem, it has disrupted Berankis career since last March, so he consulted with doctors and decided to have a groin surgery.

At the beginning of May, Berankis came back on court with representing Lithuania in the Davis Cup third group competition. In the promotion play-off tie against Greece, Berankis won singles match against Paris Gemouchidis and partnering Laurynas Grigelis he won the decisive doubles match against Paris Gemouchidis and Markos Kalovelonis. Next week, Berankis participated in Roma Open where he lost in the first round to the defending champion Simone Bolelli. After the match Berankis said that he didn't feel fully fit and he would skip the rest of clay season.

Berankis made his third and final comeback at the beginning of June on grasscourts. At the Aegon Trophy Berankis lost in the quarterfinals to the eventual champion Benjamin Becker, in three sets. Next week, in the first round of the Aegon Nottingham Challenge Berankis also faced a loss in three sets to the eventual champion Grega Žemlja. At the Wimbledon Championships Berankis lost in the first round of the qualifying draw to Andrey Kuznetsov.

In July, Berankis reached the final at the Nielsen Pro Tennis Championship, there he lost to John-Patrick Smith in three sets. At the BB&T Atlanta Open Berankis went through the qualifying draw and played his first match on ATP World Tour since last July. Berankis defeated Dmitry Tursunov but in the second round he lost to World No. 19 Kei Nishikori, in three sets.

At the Farmers Classic Berankis went through the qualifying draw and in the main draw he won four matches. He triumphed against Björn Phau, Igor Andreev, Nicolas Mahut and Marinko Matosevic to reach his first-ever ATP 250 final, there he lost to local Sam Querrey.

Berankis got a wild card to the main draw of Citi Open, there he defeated Nicolas Mahut again, but lost to World No. 15 Mardy Fish, in the second round.

=== 2013–2014: Second Australian Open third round ===
In January, Berankis took part in the qualifying round of the Australian Open in Melbourne and won his three matches to make the main draw. In the first round of the main draw, he defeated Ukrainian Sergiy Stakhovsky, in straight sets. In the second round, Berankis faced the 25th seed Florian Mayer, the three-setter took only 1 hour 17 minutes and Berankis won each set by two breaks. He lost in the third round to world No. 3 Andy Murray, in three tight sets.

In December 2014, Berankis became French tennis league champion while playing for the French for the club of Sarcelles.

=== 2015: Maiden ATP doubles title ===
Partnering Teymuraz Gabashvili, he won his maiden ATP doubles title at the 2015 U.S. Men's Clay Court Championships.

At the 2015 Citi Open, Berankis defeated Lu Yen-hsun, Pablo Cuevas and Gabashvili to reach the quarterfinals where he lost to American John Isner.

=== 2016: Top 50 career-high ranking in singles, Olympics debut ===
Berankis began the year by defeating Andreas Seppi in the first round of Doha before losing to Andrey Kuznetsov in straight sets. In Sofia, he lost to Gilles Müller in the second round in two sets. He lost in the first round of the Australian Open to Alexandr Dolgopolov, 1–6, 6–4, 4–6, 2–6.

At the 2016 Memphis Open, Berankis defeated Dudi Sela, Damir Džumhur, and Donald Young to reach the semi-finals, losing to an in-form Taylor Fritz in three sets, despite being up a set.

Berankis reached two consecutive challenger finals in Ra'anana and Gwangju, losing the former to Evgeny Donskoy and winning the latter without dropping a set, defeating Grega Žemlja and adding a sixth ATP challenger title. These results allowed Berankis to reach a new career-high ranking of No. 62 and guaranteed his entry into the tennis event at the 2016 Olympic Games in Rio, where he suffered a straight-sets defeat to Australian John Millman, failing to win a single game.

=== 2017–2018: Second ATP final ===
Berankis was the runner-up at the 2017 Kremlin Cup, the indoor event in Moscow, where he lost against Bosnian player Damir Džumhur.

=== 2019: Return to top 100, Four Challenger titles ===
Berankis began the year at the Qatar Open, where he registered a hard-fought three set victory over David Goffin before falling to Dušan Lajović in another three-set battle, despite winning the second set 6–0. After losing in the second round of the Australian Open qualifying tournament, Berankis bounced back strongly by winning the Rennes Challenger against Antoine Hoang without dropping a set. He then followed up this title with a strong performance at the Dubai Duty-Free Tennis Championships, qualifying for the main draw and then recording two straight set wins over Daniil Medvedev and Denis Kudla before losing to an in-from Gaël Monfils in three sets. Due to these results, Berankis was able to get his ranking back inside the top 100 at No. 95.

After losing in the first round of the Indian Wells Masters to Jan-Lennard Struff in three sets, Berankis won his second Challenger of the year at Drummondville 6–3, 7–5 against German Yannick Maden, also without dropping a set, bringing his ranking up to No. 82.

Berankis won his third ATP Challenger title of the year in Busan, where he defeated Liam Broady, Lee Duck-Hee and Yunseong Chung in hard-fought three set matches before securing straight-set wins over Yasutaka Uchiyama and Andrew Harris to claim the title. This marks the first time in his career that Berankis has won more than two Challenger titles in a year.

=== 2020–2021: First US Open and French Open third rounds ===
Berankis reached the third round of the 2020 US Open for the first time in his career on his eighth attempt defeating Steve Johnson. He lost to 20th seed Pablo Carreño Busta.

At the 2020 French Open he defeated Bolivia's Hugo Dellien in the first round. He faced Novak Djokovic in the second round but lost in straight sets.

He reached the third round of the 2021 French Open for the first time in his career, also in eight attempts, where he lost again to top seed and eventual champion Novak Djokovic.

After a first round defeat at the 2021 US Open, being unable to defend his points from the 2020 US Open Berankis dropped out of the top 100 in singles on 13 September 2021 to No. 107.

At the 2021 Astana Open he reached the semifinal in doubles partnering Artem Sitak, where they lost to top seeds and eventual champions Santiago González and Andrés Molteni. As a result, his doubles ranking improved to No. 202 on 27 September 2021.

At the 2021 Kremlin Cup he reached the semifinals as a lucky loser where he lost to sixth seed Marin Čilić. As a result, he returned to the top 100 at No. 99 on 25 October.

=== 2022: ATP 500 quarterfinal ===
At the 2022 Melbourne Summer Set 1 he reached the round of 16 as a qualifier where he lost to sixth seed Rafael Nadal. At the same tournament, he reached the semifinals in doubles partnering Denys Molchanov losing to sixth seeds Aleksandr Nedovyesov and Aisam-ul-Haq Qureshi. As a result, he returned to the top 100 in singles and top 200 in doubles.

Also as a qualifier, Berankis reached the quarterfinals of the ATP 500 Dubai Open after beating Jan-Lennard Struff and Alexei Popyrin. He lost to Denis Shapovalov in the quarterfinals.

He reached the final in Lille where he lost to Quentin Halys.

At the 2022 Wimbledon Championships, he recorded his fourth main draw win at the tournament defeating former semifinalist Sam Querrey in straight sets.

=== 2023–2025: 15 Challenger titles, retirement ===
Berankis won his first Challenger title since 2019 and 14th overall at the 2023 Open Saint-Brieuc.

Berankis announced his retirement from tennis on 9 December 2025 on Instagram.

== Personal life ==
Berankis was born in Vilnius, Lithuania, to Jelena and Genadijus. His mother works in a post office, while his father is a taxi driver. He has one sister, Lina Berankyte-Astrauskiene, who was also a tennis player, and now a coach and an International Tennis Federation Official. He resides in Bradenton, Florida, but now and then returns to his town of birth. He always wears a ring around his neck in memory of his best friend Aivaras Balžekas, who was a son of Berankis' coach Remigijus Balžekas. Berankis speaks Lithuanian, Russian, and English. For a time, he went by the name Richard Berankis on the ATP Tour.

== Performance timeline ==
Key
W	F	SF	QF	#R	RR	Q#	P#	DNQ	A	Z#	PO	G	S	B	NMS	NTI	P	NH

(W) winner; (F) finalist; (SF) semifinalist; (QF) quarterfinalist; (#R) rounds 4, 3, 2, 1; (RR) round-robin stage; (Q#) qualification round; (P#) preliminary round; (DNQ) did not qualify; (A) absent; (Z#) Davis/Fed Cup Zonal Group (with number indication) or (PO) play-off; (G) gold, (S) silver or (B) bronze Olympic/Paralympic medal; (NMS) not a Masters tournament; (NTI) not a Tier I tournament; (P) postponed; (NH) not held; (SR) strike rate (events won / competed); (W–L) win–loss record.
To avoid confusion and double counting, these charts are updated at the conclusion of a tournament or when the player's participation has ended.

Tournament	2007	2008	2009	2010	2011	2012	2013	2014	2015	2016	2017	2018	2019	2020	2021	2022	2023	2024	2025	SR	W–L
Grand Slam tournaments
Australian Open	A	A	A	A	3R	Q2	3R	1R	2R	1R	A	1R	Q2	2R	2R	2R	A	A	A	0 / 9	8–9
French Open	A	A	A	Q3	A	A	1R	Q3	1R	1R	1R	1R	1R	2R	3R	1R	Q2	A	A	0 / 9	3–9
Wimbledon	A	A	A	2R	A	Q1	1R	Q3	2R	1R	1R	1R	2R	NH	1R	2R	Q2	A	A	0 / 9	4–9
US Open	A	Q3	A	2R	Q2	Q3	1R	Q3	2R	2R	1R	1R	2R	3R	1R	Q1	A	A	A	0 / 9	6–9
Win–loss	0–0	0–0	0–0	2–2	2–1	0–0	2–4	0–1	3–4	1–4	0–3	0–4	2–3	4–3	3–4	2–3	0–0	0–0	0–0	0 / 36	21–36
National representation
Davis Cup	Z3	A	Z2	Z2	Z2	Z3	Z2	Z2	Z1	Z2	A	Z2	Z2	A	Z2	WG2	WG1	WG1	A	0 / 15	36–9
ATP World Tour Masters 1000
Indian Wells	A	A	A	A	2R	A	Q2	A	A	A	A	1R	2R	NH	A	A	A	A	A	0 / 3	1–3
Miami	A	Q1	A	A	1R	A	1R	Q1	1R	A	A	1R	Q1	NH	2R	A	A	A	A	0 / 5	1–5
Monte Carlo	A	A	A	A	A	A	A	A	A	A	A	A	A	NH	A	A	A	A	A	0 / 0	0–0
Madrid	A	A	A	A	A	A	A	A	Q2	A	A	A	A	NH	A	A	A	A	A	0 / 0	0–0
Rome	A	A	A	A	A	A	Q1	A	A	A	A	A	A	A	A	A	A	A	A	0 / 0	0–0
Canada	A	A	A	A	A	A	Q1	A	A	A	A	Q1	Q2	NH	1R	Q1	A	A	A	0 / 1	0–1
Cincinnati	A	A	A	A	A	A	Q1	A	A	Q1	A	Q1	A	2R	Q2	A	A	A	A	0 / 1	1–1
Shanghai	NMS		A	A	A	A	A	Q1	A	A	A	A	A	NH			A	A	A	0 / 0	0–0
Paris	A	A	A	A	A	Q2	A	A	A	Q1	A	A	1R	A	A	A	A	A	A	0 / 1	0–1
Win–loss	0–0	0–0	0–0	0–0	1–2	0–0	0–1	0–0	0–1	0–0	0–0	0–2	0–2	1–1	1–2	0–0	0–0	0–0	0–0	0 / 11	3–11
Career statistics
Tournament	2007	2008	2009	2010	2011	2012	2013	2014	2015	2016	2017	2018	2019	2020	2021	2022	2023	2024	2025	SR	W–L
Tournaments	0	2	0	3	10	5	16	7	18	15	7	15	12	7	18	10	1	0	0	146	
Titles	0	0	0	0	0	0	0	0	0	0	0	0	0	0	0	0	0	0	0	0	
Finals	0	0	0	0	0	1	0	0	0	0	1	0	0	0	0	0	0	0	0	2	
Hard W–L	0–0	0–0	2–0	6–3	8–10	10–5	10–9	9–4	13–13	10–10	5–5	9–12	6–10	6–6	10–10	8–6	1–0	2–0	0–0	0 / 99	112–103
Clay W–L	0–0	0–2	0–2	0–0	0–0	0–0	3–4	2–2	0–5	0–2	0–1	0–1	2–1	1–1	4–6	0–3	0–1	0–0	0–0	0 / 28	12–30
Grass W–L	0–0	0–0	0–0	1–1	0–0	0–0	0–3	0–1	1–3	0–3	0–1	1–2	1–1	0–0	0–2	3–1	0–1	0–0	0–0	0 / 19	7–19
Carpet W–L	0–0	0–0	0–0	1–0	Discontinued															0 / 0	1–0
Overall W–L	0–0	0–2	2–2	8–4	8–10	10–5	13–16	11–7	14–21	10–15	5–7	10–15	9–12	7–7	14–18	11–10	1–2	2–0	0–0	0 / 146	135–153
Win %	–	0%	50%	67%	44%	67%	45%	61%	40%	40%	42%	40%	43%	50%	44%	52%	33%	100%	–	46.88%	
Year-end ranking	698	459	324	87	125	114	131	86	85	92	136	117	66	69	104	168	238	314	424	$4,873,862	

== ATP Tour finals ==
=== Singles: 2 (2 runner–ups) ===
Legend Grand Slam (–) ATP 1000 (–) ATP 500 (–) ATP 250 (0–2)	Finals by surface Hard (0–2) Clay (–) Grass (–)	Finals by surface Outdoor (0–1) Indoor (0–1)

Result	W–L	Date	Tournament	Tier	Surface	Opponent	Score
Loss	0–1	Jul 2012	Los Angeles Open, United States	ATP 250	Hard	(United States) Sam Querrey	0–6, 2–6
Loss	0–2	Oct 2017	Kremlin Cup, Russia	ATP 250	Hard (i)	(Bosnia and Herzegovina) Damir Džumhur	2–6, 6–1, 4–6

=== Doubles: 1 (title) ===
Legend Grand Slam (–) ATP 1000 (–) ATP 500 (–) ATP 250 (1–0)	Finals by surface Hard (–) Clay (1–0) Grass (–)	Finals by surface Outdoor (1–0) Indoor (–)

Result	W–L	Date	Tournament	Tier	Surface	Partner	Opponents	Score
Win	1–0	Apr 2015	U.S. Men's Clay Court Championships, United States	ATP 250	Clay	(Russia) Teymuraz Gabashvili	(Philippines) Treat Huey (United States) Scott Lipsky	6–4, 6–4

== ATP Challenger and ITF Tour Finals ==
=== Singles: 30 (16–14) ===
Legend ATP Challenger (15–11) ITF Futures (1–3)	Finals by surface Hard (12–14) Clay (2–0) Grass (1–0) Carpet (1–0)

Result	W–L	Date	Tournament	Tier	Surface	Opponent	Score
Win	1–0	Mar 2007	Portugal F3, Albufeira	Futures	Hard	(Belgium) Niels Desein	7–5, 6–4
Loss	1–1	Jan 2009	Germany F2, Stuttgart	Futures	Hard (i)	(Czech Republic) Jan Mertl	4–6, 6–3, 3–6
Loss	1–2	Sep 2009	Turkey F8, Istanbul	Futures	Hard	(Kazakhstan) Alexey Kedryuk	2–6, 4–6
Loss	1–3	Nov 2009	Dominican Republic F1, Santo Domingo	Futures	Hard	(Dominican Republic) Víctor Estrella Burgos	5–7, 1–6
Win	2–3	Jun 2010	Nottingham, Great Britain	Challenger	Grass	(Japan) Go Soeda	6–4, 6–4
Loss	2–4	Aug 2010	Vancouver, Canada	Challenger	Hard	(Israel) Dudi Sela	5–7, 2–6
Win	3–4	Nov 2010	Helsinki, Finland	Challenger	Hard (i)	(Poland) Michał Przysiężny	6–1, 2–0 ret.
Loss	3–5	Nov 2011	Bratislava, Slovakia	Challenger	Hard (i)	(Slovakia) Lukáš Lacko	6–7^{(7–9)}, 2–6
Loss	3–6	Jul 2012	Winnetka, USA	Challenger	Hard	(Australia) John-Patrick Smith	6–3, 3–6, 6–7^{(3–7)}
Loss	3–7	Nov 2013	Helsinki, Finland	Challenger	Hard (i)	(Finland) Jarkko Nieminen	3–6, 1–6
Win	4–7	Jul 2014	Astana, Kazakhstan	Challenger	Hard	(Turkey) Marsel İlhan	7–5, 5–7, 6–3
Win	5–7	Nov 2014	Andria, Italy	Challenger	Carpet (i)	(Georgia (country)) Nikoloz Basilashvili	6–4, 1–0 ret.
Loss	5–8	Jul 2015	Recanati, Italy	Challenger	Hard	(Bosnia and Herzegovina) Mirza Bašić	4–6, 6–3, 6–7^{(4–7)}
Win	6–8	Nov 2015	Ortisei, Italy	Challenger	Hard (i)	(United States) Rajeev Ram	7–6^{(7–3)}, 6–4
Loss	6–9	Apr 2016	Ra'anana, Israel	Challenger	Hard	(Russia) Evgeny Donskoy	4–6, 4–6
Win	7–9	Apr 2016	Gwangju, South Korea	Challenger	Hard	(Slovenia) Grega Žemlja	6–3, 6–2
Win	8–9	Apr 2016	Nanjing, China	Challenger	Clay	(Slovenia) Grega Žemlja	6–3, 6–4
Win	9–9	May 2017	Shymkent, Kazakhstan	Challenger	Clay	(Germany) Yannick Hanfmann	6–3, 6–2
Loss	9–10	Aug 2017	Jinan, China	Challenger	Hard	(Chinese Taipei) Yen-Hsun Lu	3–6, 1–6
Loss	9–11	Jan 2018	Rennes, France	Challenger	Hard (i)	(Canada) Vasek Pospisil	1–6, 2–6
Win	10–11	Apr 2018	Saint Brieuc, France	Challenger	Hard (i)	(France) Constant Lestienne	6–2, 5–7, 6–4
Loss	10–12	Oct 2018	Brest, France	Challenger	Hard (i)	(Poland) Hubert Hurkacz	5–7, 1–6
Win	11–12	Jan 2019	Rennes, France	Challenger	Hard (i)	(France) Antoine Hoang	6–4, 6–2
Win	12–12	Mar 2019	Drummondville, Canada	Challenger	Hard	(Germany) Yannick Maden	6–3, 7–5
Win	13–12	May 2019	Busan, South Korea	Challenger	Hard	(Australia) Andrew Harris	7–6^{(7–5)}, 6–2
Win	14–12	Aug 2019	Vancouver, Canada	Challenger	Hard	(Chinese Taipei) Jason Jung	6–3, 5–7, 6–4
Loss	14–13	Mar 2022	Lille, France	Challenger	Hard (i)	(France) Quentin Halys	6–4, 6–7^{(4–7)}, 4–6
Win	15–13	Mar 2023	Saint-Brieuc, France	Challenger	Hard (i)	(France) Dan Added	6–3, 6–7^{(3–7)}, 7–6^{(7–5)}
Win	16–13	Jun 2024	Blois, France	Challenger	Hard (i)	(France) Calvin Hemery	7–6^{(7–4)}, 7–5
Loss	16–14	Apr 2025	Abidjan, Ivory Coast	Challenger	Hard	(Thailand) Maximus Jones	3–6, 6–4, 4–6

=== Doubles: 2 (1 title, 1 runner-up) ===
Legend ATP Challenger (0–1) ITF Futures (1–0)	Finals by surface Hard (1–1) Clay (–)

Result	W–L	Date	Tournament	Tier	Surface	Partner	Opponents	Score
Win	1–0	Mar 2008	USA F6, McAllen	Futures	Hard	(Belarus) Sergey Betov	(United States) Adam El Mihdawy (Belarus) Uladzimir Ignatik	6–3, 6–3
Loss	1–1	Sep 2013	Orléans, France	Challenger	Hard (i)	(Croatia) Franko Škugor	(Ukraine) Illya Marchenko (Ukraine) Sergiy Stakhovsky	7–5, 6–3

== Junior Grand Slam finals ==
=== Singles: 1 (title) ===
Result	Year	Tournament	Surface	Opponent	Score
Win	2007	US Open	Hard	(Poland) Jerzy Janowicz	6–3, 6–4

== National representation ==
=== Davis Cup ===
Berankis is a member of the Lithuania Davis Cup team, having posted a 28–8 record in singles and a 7–7 record in doubles in 23 ties played.

All Davis Cup Matches
2007 Davis Cup Europe/Africa Zone Group III
Round	Date	Opponents	Tie score	Venue	Surface	Match	Opponent	Rubber score
RR	May 9, 2007	Ireland	1–2	Cairo	Clay	Singles 1	Conor Niland	6–7^{(5–7)}, 0–6 (L)
RR	May 10, 2007	Bosnia and Herzegovina	2–1	Cairo	Clay	Singles 2	Zlatin Kadric	6–1, 7–6^{(7–4)} (W)
RR	May 10, 2007	Bosnia and Herzegovina	2–1	Cairo	Clay	Doubles (with Gvidas Sabeckis)	Bašić & Ostojic	3–6, 3–6 (L)
RR	May 11, 2007	Moldova	2–1	Cairo	Clay	Singles 2	Andrei Ciumac	6–4, 6–0 (W)
RR	May 12, 2007	Turkey	2–1	Cairo	Clay	Singles 2	Ergün Zorlu	6–0, 7–6^{(7–3)} (W)
RR	May 13, 2007	Egypt	1–2	Cairo	Clay	Singles 1	Karim Maamoun	5–7, 6–7^{(13–15)} (L)
2009 Davis Cup Europe/Africa Zone Group II
Round	Date	Opponents	Tie score	Venue	Surface	Match	Opponent	Rubber score
1R	March 6–8, 2009	Georgia	3–2	Vilnius	Hard (i)	Singles 1	George Khrikadze	6–1, 6–3, 6–1 (W)
1R	March 6–8, 2009	Georgia	3–2	Vilnius	Hard (i)	Singles 4	Lado Chikhladze	6–3, 6–4, 6–1 (W)
2R	July 10–12, 2009	Slovenia	5–0	Otočec	Clay	Singles 1	Grega Žemlja	1–6, 4–6, 3–6 (L)
2R	July 10–12, 2009	Slovenia	5–0	Otočec	Clay	Doubles (with Vadim Pinko)	Kračman & Žemlja	6–7^{(2–7)}, 3–6, 3–6 (L)
2R	July 10–12, 2009	Slovenia	5–0	Otočec	Clay	Singles 4 (dead)	Janez Semrajc	3–6, 5–7 (L)
2010 Davis Cup Europe/Africa Zone Group II
Round	Date	Opponents	Tie score	Venue	Surface	Match	Opponent	Rubber score
1R	March 5–7, 2010	Great Britain	3–2	Vilnius	Hard (i)	Singles 2	Daniel Evans	6–1, 4–6, 7–6^{(7–5)}, 3–6, 6–3 (W)
1R	March 5–7, 2010	Great Britain	3–2	Vilnius	Hard (i)	Singles 4	James Ward	7–6^{(7–4)}, 6–3, 6–4 (W)
2R	July 9–11, 2010	Ireland	3–2	Dublin	Carpet	Singles 1	James McGee	6–7^{(2–7)}, 6–4, 6–4, 6–3 (W)
2R	July 9–11, 2010	Ireland	3–2	Dublin	Carpet	Doubles (with Laurynas Grigelis)	Cluskey & King	6–3, 6–3, 6–4 (W)
3R	September 17–19, 2010	Slovenia	2–3	Vilnius	Hard (i)	Singles 1	Blaž Kavčič	3–6, 6–2, 7–6^{(11–9)}, 6–4 (W)
3R	September 17–19, 2010	Slovenia	2–3	Vilnius	Hard (i)	Doubles (with Laurynas Grigelis)	Gregorc & Žemlja	5–7, 4–6, 6–1, 6–3, 6–3 (W)
3R	September 17–19, 2010	Slovenia	2–3	Vilnius	Hard (i)	Singles 4	Grega Žemlja	6–7^{(2–7)}, 4–6, 3–6 (L)
2011 Davis Cup Europe/Africa Zone Group II
Round	Date	Opponents	Tie score	Venue	Surface	Match	Opponent	Rubber score
1R	March 4–6, 2011	Estonia	2–3	Tallinn	Hard (i)	Singles 1	Jaak Põldma	7–6^{(7–3)}, 6–2, 6–3 (W)
1R	March 4–6, 2011	Estonia	2–3	Tallinn	Hard (i)	Doubles (with Dovydas Šakinis)	Künnap & Zopp	2–6, 3–6, 6–3, 3–6 (L)
1R	March 4–6, 2011	Estonia	2–3	Tallinn	Hard (i)	Singles 4	Jürgen Zopp	1–6, 4–6, 6–4, 6–3, 11–9 (W)
2012 Davis Cup Europe Zone Group III
Round	Date	Opponents	Tie score	Venue	Surface	Match	Opponent	Rubber score
PO	May 5, 2012	Greece	2–1	Sofia	Clay	Singles 2	Paris Gemouchidis	7–6^{(7–4)}, 6–3 (W)
PO	May 5, 2012	Greece	2–1	Sofia	Clay	Doubles (with Laurynas Grigelis)	Gemouchidis & Kalovelonis	6–2, 7–5 (W)
2013 Davis Cup Europe/Africa Zone Group II
Round	Date	Opponents	Tie score	Venue	Surface	Match	Opponent	Rubber score
1R	February 1–3, 2013	Cyprus	4–1	Šiauliai	Hard (i)	Singles 2	Petros Chrysochos	6–1, 6–4, 6–0 (W)
1R	February 1–3, 2013	Cyprus	4–1	Šiauliai	Hard (i)	Doubles (with Lukas Mugevičius)	Chrysochos & Cuzdriorean	5–7, 6–3, 6–3, 4–6, 4–6 (L)
1R	February 1–3, 2013	Cyprus	4–1	Šiauliai	Hard (i)	Singles 4	Soteris Hadjistyllis	6–3, 6–2, 6–1 (W)
2014 Davis Cup Europe/Africa Zone Group II
Round	Date	Opponents	Tie score	Venue	Surface	Match	Opponent	Rubber score
1R	January 31–February 2, 2014	Norway	5–0	Oslo	Hard (i)	Singles 2	Viktor Durasovic	7–5, 6–3, 6–2 (W)
1R	January 31–February 2, 2014	Norway	5–0	Oslo	Hard (i)	Doubles (with Laurynas Grigelis)	Boretti & Durasovic	6–1, 6–4, 7–5 (W)
2R	April 4–6, 2014	South Africa	3–2	Centurion, Gauteng	Hard	Singles 1	Jean Andersen	6–3, 7–6^{(7–2)}, 6–3 (W)
2R	April 4–6, 2014	South Africa	3–2	Centurion, Gauteng	Hard	Doubles (with Laurynas Grigelis)	Andersen & Klaasen	6–3, 3–6, 3–6, 6–7^{(5–7)} (L)
2R	April 4–6, 2014	South Africa	3–2	Centurion, Gauteng	Hard	Singles 4	Rik de Voest	6–2, 6–4, 5–7, 7–5 (W)
3R	September 12–14, 2014	Bosnia and Herzegovina	3–2	Sarajevo	Hard	Singles 1	Mirza Bašić	5–7, 3–6, 6–4, 6–4, 6–4 (W)
3R	September 12–14, 2014	Bosnia and Herzegovina	3–2	Sarajevo	Hard	Doubles (with Laurynas Grigelis)	Bašić & Brkić	6–3, 6–3, 7–6^{(7–4)} (W)
3R	September 12–14, 2014	Bosnia and Herzegovina	3–2	Sarajevo	Hard	Singles 4	Damir Džumhur	6–4, 6–4, 6–4 (W)
2015 Davis Cup Europe/Africa Zone Group I
Round	Date	Opponents	Tie score	Venue	Surface	Match	Opponent	Rubber score
1R	March 6–8, 2015	Poland	2–3	Płock	Hard (i)	Singles 1	Łukasz Kubot	6–2, 6–4, 6–3 (W)
1R	March 6–8, 2015	Poland	2–3	Płock	Hard (i)	Doubles (with Laurynas Grigelis)	Kubot & Matkowski	4–6, 4–6, 6–7^{(1–7)} (L)
1R	March 6–8, 2015	Poland	2–3	Płock	Hard (i)	Singles 4	Jerzy Janowicz	3–6, 4–6, 2–6 (L)

== Wins over top 10 players ==
- Berankis had a 2–15 record against players who were, at the time the match was played, ranked in the top 10.

Season	2007	2008	2009	2010	2011	2012	2013	2014	2015	2016	2017	2018	2019	2020	2021	2022	Total
Wins	0	0	0	0	0	0	0	1	0	1	0	0	0	0	0	0	2

#	Player	Rank	Event	Surface	Rd	Score	RB Rank
2014
1.	(Canada) Milos Raonic	9	Kremlin Cup, Russia	Hard (i)	2R	6–3, 4–6, 6–3	116
2016
2.	(Canada) Milos Raonic	4	Swiss Indoors, Switzerland	Hard (i)	1R	3–6, 6–3, 6–3	91

== Record against top 10 players ==
- Berankis' match record against those who have been ranked in the top 10 is as follows (former #1 in bold):
- (Canada) Milos Raonic 2–1
- (France) Arnaud Clément 1–0
- (Germany) Tommy Haas 1–0
- (Argentina) David Nalbandian 1–0
- (France) Gilles Simon 1–0
- (Russia) **Daniil Medvedev 1–1**
- (United States) Jack Sock 1–1
- (Greece) Stefanos Tsitsipas 1–1
- (Spain) Roberto Bautista Agut 1–2
- (Austria) Jürgen Melzer 1–2
- (Canada) Denis Shapovalov 1–2
- (Belgium) David Goffin 1–3
- (South Africa) Kevin Anderson 0–1
- (Croatia) Marin Čilić 0–1
- (Argentina) Juan Martín del Potro 0–1
- (Spain) David Ferrer 0–1
- (United States) Mardy Fish 0–1
- (Latvia) Ernests Gulbis 0–1
- (United Kingdom) **Andy Murray 0–1**
- (France) Lucas Pouille 0–1
- (Spain) Tommy Robredo 0–1
- (United States) **Andy Roddick 0–1**
- (Russia) Andrey Rublev 0–1
- (Argentina) Diego Schwartzman 0–1
- (Austria) Dominic Thiem 0–1
- (France) Jo Wilfried Tsonga 0–1
- (Switzerland) Stan Wawrinka 0–1
- (Cyprus) Marcos Baghdatis 0–2
- (Spain) Pablo Carreño Busta 0–2
- (Russia) Karen Khachanov 0–2
- (France) Gaël Monfils 0–2
- (Spain) **Rafael Nadal 0–2**
- (Japan) Kei Nishikori 0–2
- (Spain) Fernando Verdasco 0–2
- (Germany) Alexander Zverev 0–2
- (Italy) Fabio Fognini 0–3
- (United States) John Isner 0–3
- (Serbia) **Novak Djokovic 0–4**

*As of 30 August 2021.

== Notes ==
Awards
Preceded by (Netherlands) Thiemo de Bakker	ITF Junior World Champion; 2007	Succeeded by (Chinese Taipei) Yang Tsung-hua
