= Martin Emmrich =

German tennis player

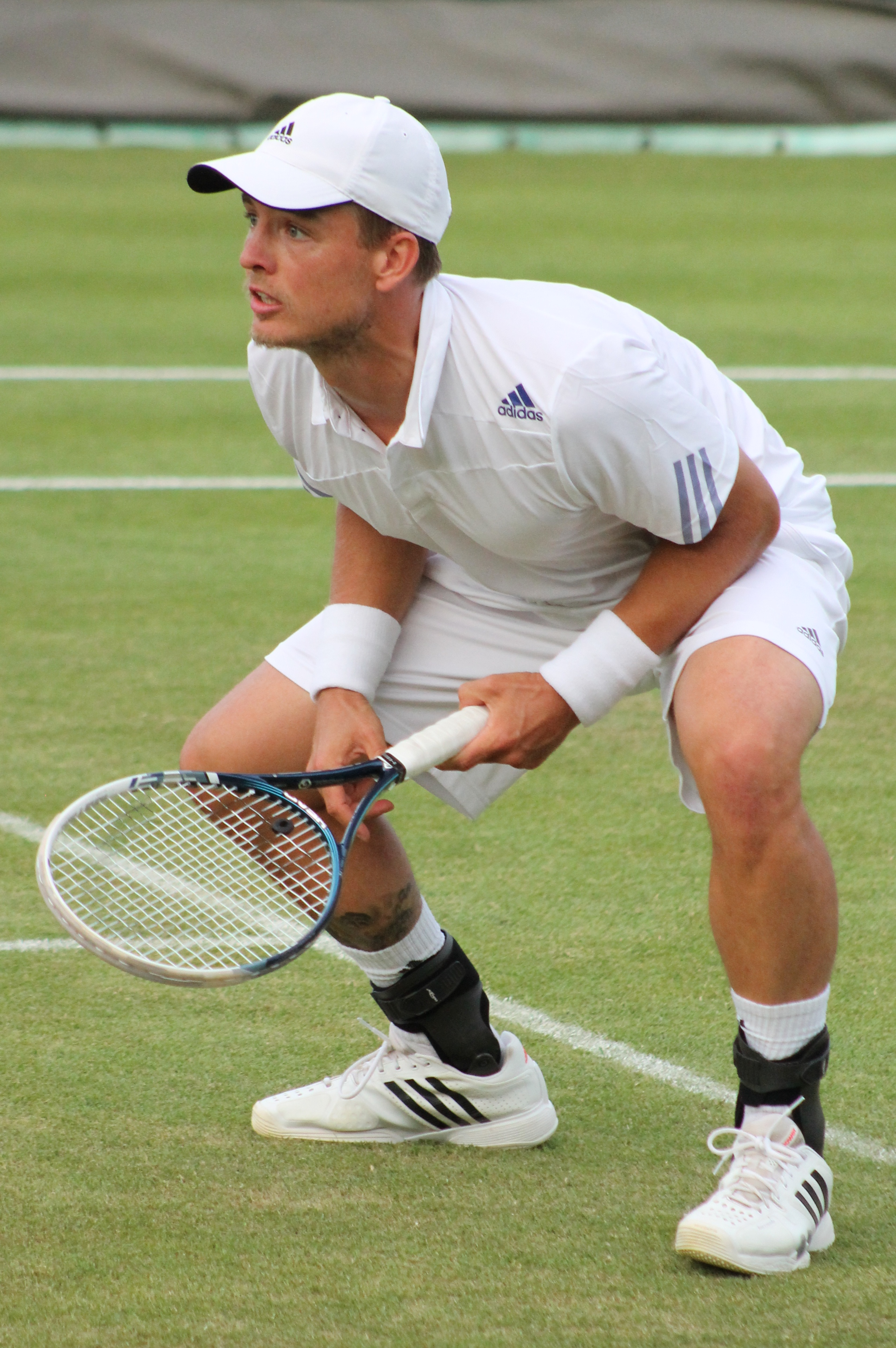
- Martin Emmrich playing at the 2013 Wimbledon Championships
- Country (sports): Germany
- Residence: Solingen, Germany
- Born: 17 December 1984 (age 40); Magdeburg, German Democratic Republic
- Height: 1.83 m (6 ft 0 in)
- Turned pro: 2001
- Retired: 2015
- Plays: Left-handed (two-handed backhand)
- Prize money: $386,441

Singles
- Career record: 0–1
- Highest ranking: No. 604 (12 October 2009)

Doubles
- Career record: 54–61
- Career titles: 3; 15 ATP Challenger Tour
- Highest ranking: No. 35 (5 August 2013)

Grand Slam doubles results
- Australian Open: 1R (2013, 2014)
- French Open: 2R (2013)
- Wimbledon: 2R (2012, 2013)
- US Open: 2R (2011, 2013, 2014)

Martin Emmrich (born 17 December 1984) is a retired professional tennis player and current professional pickleball player on the PPA tour who specialized in doubles & mixed. He played primarily on the ATP Challenger Tour where he has won 15 Challengers. On 12 October 2009, he reached his highest ATP singles ranking of world No. 604 whilst his highest doubles ranking of No. 35 was achieved on 5 August 2013. Emmrich also won three ATP Tour doubles titles.

== Personal life ==
He is the son of Thomas Emmrich, a former German tennis player who played for the East Germany and the only one from that country to ever hold an ATP ranking. Martin married Dutch player Michaëlla Krajicek in July 2015. They separated in 2018.

Emmrich has since remarried to Tamaryn Hendler.

== ATP career finals ==
=== Doubles: 7 (3 titles, 4 runner-ups) ===
Legend Grand Slam Tournaments (0–0) ATP World Tour Finals (0–0) ATP World Tour Masters 1000 (0–0) ATP World Tour 500 Series (0–0) ATP World Tour 250 Series (3–4)	Finals by surface Hard (1–1) Clay (2–2) Grass (0–1) Carpet (0–0)

Outcome	No.	Date	Tournament	Surface	Partner	Opponents	Score
Runner-up	1.	6 May 2012	Serbia Open, Belgrade, Serbia	Clay	(Sweden) Andreas Siljeström	(Israel) Jonathan Erlich (Israel) Andy Ram	6–4, 2–6, [6–10]
Winner	1.	21 October 2012	Erste Bank Open, Vienna, Austria	Hard (i)	(Germany) Andre Begemann	(Austria) Julian Knowle (Slovakia) Filip Polášek	6–4, 3–6, [10–4]
Runner-up	2.	6 January 2013	Chennai Open, Chennai, India	Hard	(Germany) Andre Begemann	(France) Benoît Paire (Switzerland) Stanislas Wawrinka	2–6, 1–6
Winner	2.	25 May 2013	Power Horse Cup, Düsseldorf, Germany	Clay	(Germany) Andre Begemann	(Philippines) Treat Conrad Huey (United Kingdom) Dominic Inglot	7–5, 6–2
Runner-up	3.	22 June 2013	Topshelf Open, 's-Hertogenbosch, Netherlands	Grass	(Germany) Andre Begemann	(Belarus) Max Mirnyi (Romania) Horia Tecău	3–6, 6–7^{(4–7)}
Winner	3.	3 August 2013	Bet-at-home Cup, Kitzbühel, Austria	Clay	(Germany) Christopher Kas	(Czech Republic) František Čermák (Czech Republic) Lukáš Dlouhý	6–4, 6–3
Runner-up	4.	24 May 2014	Power Horse Cup, Düsseldorf, Germany	Clay	(Germany) Christopher Kas	(Mexico) Santiago González (United States) Scott Lipsky	5–7, 6–4, [3–10]

== Challenger career finals ==
=== Doubles: 23 (15–8) ===
Outcome	No.	Date	Tournament	Surface	Partner	Opponents	Score
Winner	1.	9 November 2009	Charlottesville, United States	Hard (i)	(Sweden) Andreas Siljeström	(United Kingdom) Dominic Inglot (United States) Rylan Rizza	6–4, 3–6, [11–9]
Winner	2.	14 November 2009	Knoxville, United States	Hard (i)	(Sweden) Andreas Siljeström	(South Africa) Raven Klaasen (South Africa) Izak van der Merwe	7–5, 6–4
Runner-up	1.	1 May 2010	Manta, Ecuador	Hard	(Sweden) Andreas Siljeström	(United States) Ryler DeHeart (Canada) Pierre-Ludovic Duclos	4–6, 5–7
Runner-up	2.	6 June 2010]	Fürth, Germany	Clay	(Australia) Joseph Sirianni	(Jamaica) Dustin Brown (Australia) Rameez Junaid	3–6, 1–6
Runner-up	3.	5 September 2010	Como, Italy	Clay	(Poland) Mateusz Kowalczyk	(Germany) Frank Moser (Czech Republic) David Škoch	7–5, 6–7^{(2–7)}, [5–10]
Winner	3.	12 September 2010	Genoa, Italy	Clay	(Germany) Andre Begemann	(United States) Brian Battistone (Sweden) Andreas Siljeström	1–6, 7–6^{(7–3)}, [10–7]
Winner	4.	3 October 2010	Cali, Colombia	Clay	(Germany) Andre Begemann	(Germany) Gero Kretschmer (Germany) Alex Satschko	6–4, 7–6^{(7–5)}
Winner	5.	28 November 2010	Helsinki, Finland	Hard (i)	(Germany) Dustin Brown	(Finland) Henri Kontinen (Finland) Jarkko Nieminen	7–6^{(19–17)}, 0–6, [10–7]
Runner-up	4.	5 June 2011	Nottingham, United Kingdom	Grass	(Germany) Dustin Brown	(United Kingdom) Colin Fleming (United Kingdom) Ross Hutchins	6–4, 6–7^{(6–8)}, [11–13]
Winner	6.	26 June 2011	Marburg, Germany	Clay	(Germany) Björn Phau	(Argentina) Federico del Bonis (Argentina) Horacio Zeballos	7–6^{(7–3)}, 6–2
Winner	7.	3 July 2011	Braunschweig, Germany	Clay	(Sweden) Andreas Siljeström	(France) Olivier Charroin (France) Stéphane Robert	0–6, 6–4, [10–7]
Winner	8.	16 October 2011	Rennes, France	Hard	(Sweden) Andreas Siljeström	(France) Kenny de Schepper (France) Édouard Roger-Vasselin	6–4, 6–4
Runner-up	5.	19 November 2011	Champaign, United States	Hard	(Sweden) Andreas Siljeström	(South Africa) Rik de Voest (South Africa) Izak van der Merwe	6–2, 3–6, [4–10]
Winner	9.	26 November 2011	Helsinki, Finland	Hard	(Sweden) Andreas Siljeström	(United States) James Cerretani (Slovakia) Michal Mertiňák	6–4, 6–4
Winner	10.	7 April 2012	Tallahassee, United States	Hard	(Sweden) Andreas Siljeström	(New Zealand) Artem Sitak (United States) Blake Strode	6–2, 7–6^{(7–4)}
Runner-up	6.	22 April 2012	Sarasota, United States	Clay	(Sweden) Andreas Siljeström	(Sweden) Johan Brunström (South Africa) Izak van der Merwe	4–6, 1–6
Winner	11.	9 September 2012	Genoa, Italy	Clay	(Germany) Andre Begemann	(Germany) Dominik Meffert (Austria) Philipp Oswald	6–3, 6–1
Winner	12.	22 September 2012	Szczecin, Poland	Clay	(Germany) Andre Begemann	(Poland) Tomasz Bednarek (Poland) Mateusz Kowalczyk	3–6, 6–1, [10–3]
Winner	13.	12 October 2012	Tashkent, Uzbekistan	Hard	(Germany) Andre Begemann	(Australia) Rameez Junaid (Germany) Frank Moser	6–7^{(2–7)}, 7–6^{(7–2)}, [10–8]
Runner-up	7.	21 April 2013	Rome, Italy	Clay	(Australia) Rameez Junaid	(Germany) Andreas Beck (Austria) Martin Fischer	6–7^{(2–7)}, 0–6
Winner	14.	12 May 2013	Rome, Italy	Clay	(Germany) Andre Begemann	(Germany) Philipp Marx (Romania) Florin Mergea	7–6^{(7–4)}, 6–3
Winner	15.	15 February 2015	Bergamo, Italy	Hard (i)	(Sweden) Andreas Siljestrom	(Poland) Mateusz Kowalczyk (Poland) Blazej Koniusz	6–4, 7–5
Runner-up	8.	8 March 2015	Quimper, France	Hard (i)	(Sweden) Andreas Siljestrom	(Poland) Mateusz Kowalczyk (Poland) Blazej Koniusz	6–3, 6–7^{(5–7)}, [8–10]

== Grand Slam doubles performance timeline ==
Key
W	F	SF	QF	#R	RR	Q#	DNQ	A	NH

(W) winner; (F) finalist; (SF) semifinalist; (QF) quarterfinalist; (#R) rounds 4, 3, 2, 1; (RR) round-robin stage; (Q#) qualification round; (DNQ) did not qualify; (A) absent; (NH) not held; (SR) strike rate (events won / competed); (W–L) win–loss record.

Tournament	2010	2011	2012	2013	2014	2015	W–L
Australian Open	A	A	A	1R	1R	A	0–2
French Open	A	A	1R	2R	1R	A	1–3
Wimbledon	A	Q1	2R	2R	1R	Q1	2–3
US Open	A	2R	1R	2R	2R	A	3–4
Win–loss	0–0	1–1	1–3	3–4	1–4	0–0	6–12
Career statistics
Titles / Finals	0 / 0	0 / 0	1 / 2	2 / 4	0 / 1	0 / 0	3 / 7
Overall win–loss	0–1	2–5	10–11	26–23	11–16	5–5	54–61
Year-end ranking	109	87	58	42	108	164	51%

== See also ==
- Thomas Emmrich
