= Michał Przysiężny =

Polish tennis player

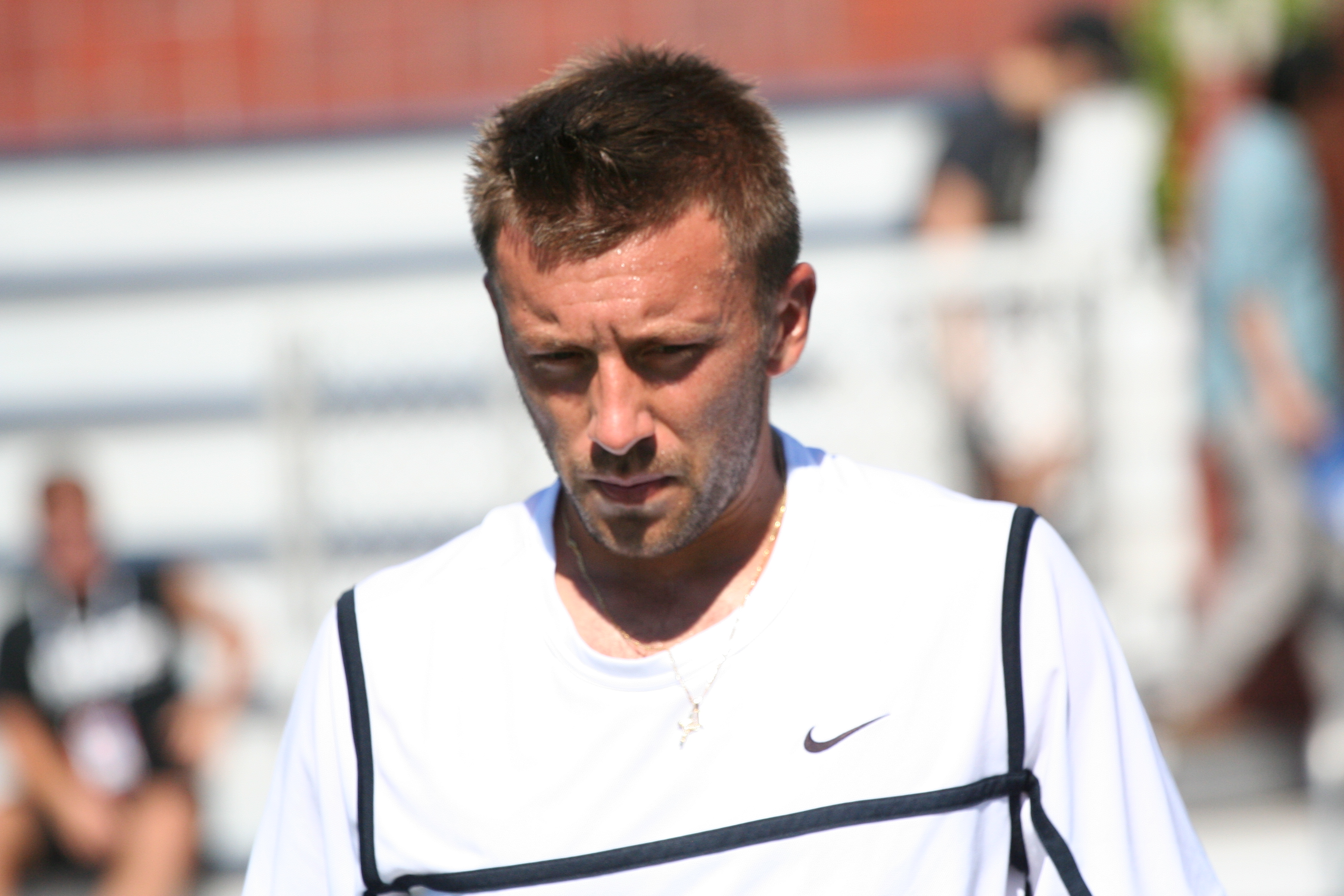
- Country (sports): Poland
- Residence: Wrocław, Poland
- Born: February 16, 1984 (age 42) Głogów, Poland
- Height: 1.85 m (6 ft 1 in)
- Turned pro: 2001
- Retired: 2019
- Plays: Right-handed (one-handed backhand)
- Coach: Aleksander Charpantidis
- Prize money: $1,341,718

Singles
- Career record: 31–75 (ATP Tour and Grand Slam main draws and Davis Cup)
- Career titles: 0
- Highest ranking: No. 57 (27 January 2014)

Grand Slam singles results
- Australian Open: 2R (2014)
- French Open: 2R (2013)
- Wimbledon: 2R (2010, 2013)
- US Open: 1R (2007, 2010, 2013)

Doubles
- Career record: 9–17 (ATP Tour and Grand Slam main draws, and in Davis Cup)
- Career titles: 1
- Highest ranking: No. 119 (28 September 2015)

Grand Slam doubles results
- Australian Open: 1R (2014)
- Last updated on: 31 January 2023.

Michał Przysiężny (Polish pronunciation: [ˈmixaw pʂɨˈɕɛ̃ʐnɨ]; born 16 February 1984) is a former Polish professional tennis player. He reached the semifinals of St. Petersburg in 2013, achieving a career-high singles ranking of World No. 57 in January 2014.

== Career ==
He started his career in the KKT Wrocław. In 2002 Przysiężny reached the semifinals of the boys' doubles at the French Open (partnered with Attila Balázs from Hungary). In the same year, he won his first Futures tournament in Montego Bay, Jamaica, defeating Jean-Julien Rojer in the final. He has reached ten finals of these tournaments, winning seven.

He qualified for his first Grand Slam tournament (2007 US Open) by beating his compatriot Łukasz Kubot. He lost in four sets to Michael Berrer in the first round.

Przysiężny made a return from a knee injury qualifying as a lucky loser in the 2008 Swedish Open; however, he lost to Jonas Björkman in the first round and winning Davis Cup matches.

At the end of 2009, his career gained momentum. He won three Futures tournaments in a row (Germany F19, Belarus F1, and Belarus F2) and rose 235 places to no. 427 in the ATP rankings. In November, he won the IPP Open, defeating Stéphane Bohli in the final from a set down. He finished the year as no. 183. Three months later, he won another Challenger tournament, where he eliminated Andrey Kuznetsov, Evgeny Kirillov, Goran Tošić, Tobias Kamke, and Julian Reister in the final. The week of March 29, he won matches against Caio Zampieri, Laurynas Grigelis, Charles-Antoine Brézac, Teymuraz Gabashvili, and Rubén Ramírez Hidalgo in the final of the Saint–Brieuc Challenger. Two weeks later, he lost to Santiago González in the final of the León Challenger. After this event, he was in the top 100 of the ATP rankings.

He got direct entry into a Grand Slam tournament for the first time in his career at the 2010 French Open. Przysiężny lost in straights sets in the first round to eventual quarterfinalist Mikhail Youzhny. He then entered the Wimbledon main draw for the first time, where he was met 17th seed Ivan Ljubičić. Przysiężny scored the biggest win of his career, defeating the Croatian in straight sets, subsequently losing in the second round to eventual quarterfinalist Yen-Hsun Lu. At the US Open, he faced 21st seed Albert Montañés, losing in five sets. Michał served for the match at 6–5 in the fourth set, squandering two match points.

At the 2013 St. Petersburg Open he defeated Albert Ramos, Fabio Fognini and Lukáš Rosol to reach semifinals, where he lost to Ernests Gulbis. At Tokyo he defeated Marcel Granollers in first round but lost in second round to Jarkko Nieminen. At the Paris Masters he defeated Jarkko Nieminen.

At the 2014 ATP 500 Tokyo singles tournament, he won over world number 12 Jo-Wilfried Tsonga, but lost in second round to Denis Istomin. In doubles he partnered with Pierre-Hugues Herbert, defeating the Bryan brothers, Jamie Murray / John Peers, Eric Butorac / Raven Klaasen and Ivan Dodig / Marcelo Melo to claim the title.

== ATP career finals ==
=== Doubles: 1 (1 title) ===
Winner – Legend Grand Slam tournaments (0–0) ATP World Tour Finals (0–0) ATP World Tour Masters 1000 (0–0) ATP World Tour 500 Series (1–0) ATP World Tour 250 Series (0–0)	Titles by surface Hard (1–0) Clay (0–0) Grass (0–0) Carpet (0–0)

Result	W–L	Date	Tournament	Tier	Surface	Partner	Opponents	Score
Win	1–0	Oct 2014	Japan Open, Japan	500 Series	Hard	(France) Pierre-Hugues Herbert	(Croatia) Ivan Dodig (Brazil) Marcelo Melo	6–3, 6–7^{(3–7)}, [10–5]

== ATP Challenger and ITF Futures finals ==
=== Singles: 28 (18–10) ===
Legend ATP Challenger (8–5) ITF Futures (10–5)	Finals by surface Hard (10–6) Clay (6–4) Grass (0–0) Carpet (2–0)

Result	W–L	Date	Tournament	Tier	Surface	Opponent	Score
Loss	0–1	Dec 2002	Aruba F1, Oranjestad	Futures	Hard	(Netherlands) Jean-Julien Rojer	2–6, 2–6
Win	1–1	Dec 2002	Jamaica F21, Montego Bay	Futures	Hard	(Netherlands) Jean-Julien Rojer	7–6^{(9–7)}, 6–4
Loss	1–2	Aug 2003	Poland F1, Poznań	Futures	Clay	(Finland) Kim Tiilikainen	6–4, 1–6, 3–6
Win	2–2	Dec 2003	Iran F3, Kish Island	Futures	Clay	(Austria) Johannes Ager	6–0, 6–4
Win	3–2	Jun 2004	Poland F2, Koszalin	Futures	Clay	(Australia) Sadik Kadir	6–3, 6–3
Win	4–2	Oct 2004	Georgia F1, Tbilisi	Futures	Clqy	(Russia) Kirill Ivanov-Smolenskii	7–5, 6–3
Loss	4–3	Nov 2006	Iran F5, Kish Island	Futures	Clay	(Czech Republic) Adam Vejmelka	6–1, 2–6, 2–6
Win	5–3	Jan 2007	Wrexham, United Kingdom	Challenger	Hard	(United Kingdom) Richard Bloomfield	6–2, 6–3
Win	6–3	Oct 2009	Germany F19, Leimen	Futures	Hard	(Finland) Henri Kontinen	3–6, 6–2, 7–5
Win	7–3	Oct 2009	Belarus F1, Minsk	Futures	Carpet	(Belarus) Sergey Betov	6–2, 6–3
Win	8–3	Oct 2009	Belarus F2, Minsk	Futures	Hard	(Belarus) Nikolai Fidirko	6–3, 6–2
Win	9–3	Nov 2009	Helsinki, Finland	Challenger	Hard	(Switzerland) Stéphane Bohli	4–6, 6–4, 6–1
Win	10–3	Feb 2010	Kazan, Russia	Challenger	Hard	(Germany) Julian Reister	7–6^{(7–5)}, 6–4
Win	11–3	Apr 2010	Saint-Brieuc, France	Challenger	Clay	(Spain) Rubén Ramírez Hidalgo	4–6, 6–2, 6–3
Loss	11–4	Apr 2010	León, Mexico	Challenger	Hard	(Mexico) Santiago Gonzále	6–3, 1–6, 5–7
Win	12–4	Nov 2010	Ortisei, Italy	Challenger	Clay	(Slovakia) Lukáš Lacko	6–3, 7–5
Loss	12–5	Nov 2010	Helsinki, Finland	Challenger	Hard	(Lithuania) Ričardas Berankis	1–6, 0–2 ret.
Win	13–5	Jan 2012	Great Britain F1, Glasgow	Futures	Hard	(Bosnia and Herzegovina) Mirza Bašić	6–1, 7–6^{(9–7)}
Win	14–5	May 2012	Korea F2, Changwon	Futures	Hard	(Australia) Sam Groth	3–6, 7–5, 6–3
Loss	14–6	Jul 2012	Italy F19, Fano	Futures	Clay	(Spain) José Checa Calvo	4–6, 2–6
Loss	14–7	Aug 2012	Poland F4, Bydgoszcz	Futures	Clay	(Czech Republic) Dušan Lojda	2–6, 6–3, 5–7
Win	15–7	Sep 2012	Poland F6, Legnica	Futures	Clay	(Poland) Adam Chadaj	6–0, 6–2
Win	16–7	Nov 2012	Toyota, Japan	Challenger	Carpet	(Japan) Hiroki Moriya	6–2, 6–3
Win	17–7	Feb 2013	Bergamo, Italy	Challenger	Hard	(Germany) Jan-Lennard Struff	4–6, 7–6^{(7–5)}, 7–6^{(7–5)}
Loss	17–8	May 2013	Johannesburg, South Africa	Challenger	Hard	(Canada) Vasek Pospisil	7–6^{(9–7)}, 0–6, 1–4 ret.
Loss	17–9	Nov 2014	Geneva, Switzerland	Challenger	Hard	(Cyprus) Marcos Baghdatis	1–6, 6–4, 3–6
Win	18–9	Mar 2015	Kyoto, Japan	Challenger	Hard	(Australia) John Millman	6–3, 3–6, 6–3
Loss	18–10	Mar 2017	Wrocław, Poland	Challenger	Hard	(Austria) Jürgen Melzer	4–6, 3–6

=== Doubles: 13 (3–10) ===
Legend ATP Challenger (1–4) ITF Futures (2–6)	Finals by surface Hard (0–4) Clay (3–5) Grass (0–0) Carpet (0–1)

Result	W–L	Date	Tournament	Tier	Surface	Partner	Opponents	Score
Win	1–0	Jun 2002	Poland F5, Gdynia	Futures	Clay	(Poland) Bartlomiej Dabrowski	(Poland) Marcin Golab (Poland) Kamil Lewandowicz	6–0, 6–1
Loss	1–1	Feb 2004	USA F5, Harlingen	Futures	Hard	(Czech Republic) Daniel Lustig	(United States) Scott Lipsky (United States) David Martin	3–6, 2–6
Win	2–1	May 2004	Germany F6, Neheim-Husten	Futures	Clay	(Poland) Filip Urban	(Germany) Christopher Koderisch (Germany) Ulrich Tippenhauer	6–1, 6–2
Loss	2–2	Mar 2006	Poland F2, Wrocław	Futures	Hard	(Poland) Tomasz Bednarek	(Russia) Vadim Davletshin (Ukraine) Mikhail Filima	3–6, 5–7
Loss	2–3	May 2006	Japan F4, Munakata	Futures	Hard	(Germany) Mischa Zverev	(United States) Troy Hahn (United States) Michael Yani	5–7, 5–7
Win	3–3	Jul 2006	Poznań, Poland	Challenger	Clay	(Poland) Tomasz Bednarek	(Greece) Vasilis Mazarakis (Czech Republic) Jan Mertl	6–3, 3–6, [10–8]
Loss	3–4	Aug 2006	Manerbio, Italy	Challenger	Clay	(Italy) Federico Torresi	(Romania) Gabriel Moraru (Romania) Adrian Ungur	3–6, 3–6
Loss	3–5	Nov 2006	Iran F5, Kish Island	Futures	Clay	(Slovakia) Viktor Bruthans	(Italy) Fabio Colangelo (Italy) Marco Crugnola	3–6, 1–6
Loss	3–6	Jun 2007	Bytom, Poland	Challenger	Clay	(Poland) Tomasz Bednarek	(United States) Hugo Armando (Argentina) Brian Dabul	4–6, 6–1, [5–10]
Loss	3–7	Sep 2007	Orléans, France	Challenger	Hard	(Poland) Tomasz Bednarek	(United States) James Cerretani (Germany) Frank Moser	1–6, 6–7^{(2–7)}
Loss	3–8	Oct 2009	Belarus F1, Minsk	Futures	Carpet	(Poland) Dawid Olejniczak	(Belarus) Sergey Betov (Belarus) Nikolai Fidirko	6–7^{(3–7)}, 6–7^{(3–7)}
Loss	3–9	Nov 2010	Ortisei, Italy	Challenger	Clay	(Poland) Tomasz Bednarek	(Russia) Mikhail Elgin (Russia) Alexander Kudryavtsev	6–3, 3–6, [3–10]
Loss	3–10	Aug 2012	Poland F4, Bydgoszcz	Futures	Clay	(Poland) Grzegorz Panfil	(Ukraine) Artem Smirnov (Russia) Andrei Vasilevski	6–7^{(6–8)}, 0–6

== Performance timeline ==
Key
W	F	SF	QF	#R	RR	Q#	P#	DNQ	A	Z#	PO	G	S	B	NMS	NTI	P	NH

(W) winner; (F) finalist; (SF) semifinalist; (QF) quarterfinalist; (#R) rounds 4, 3, 2, 1; (RR) round-robin stage; (Q#) qualification round; (P#) preliminary round; (DNQ) did not qualify; (A) absent; (Z#) Davis/Fed Cup Zonal Group (with number indication) or (PO) play-off; (G) gold, (S) silver or (B) bronze Olympic/Paralympic medal; (NMS) not a Masters tournament; (NTI) not a Tier I tournament; (P) postponed; (NH) not held; (SR) strike rate (events won / competed); (W–L) win–loss record.

=== Singles ===
Tournament	2007	2008	2009	2010	2011	2012	2013	2014	2015	SR	W–L	Win%
Grand Slam tournaments
Australian Open	Q1	A	Q1	Q3	1R	A	Q1	2R	Q3	0 / 2	1–2	33%
French Open	Q1	A	A	1R	A	A	2R	1R	Q2	0 / 3	1–3	25%
Wimbledon	Q2	Q3	A	2R	A	A	2R	1R	Q2	0 / 3	2–3	40%
US Open	1R	Q2	A	1R	A	A	1R	Q3	Q2	0 / 3	0–3	0%
Win–loss	0–1	0–0	0–0	1–3	0–1	0–0	2–3	1–3	0–0	0 / 11	4–11	27%
ATP Tour Masters 1000
Miami	A	A	A	A	Q1	A	A	1R	A	0 / 1	0–1	0%
Monte Carlo	A	A	A	A	A	A	A	Q1	A	0 / 0	0–0	–
Canada	A	A	A	Q1	A	A	A	A	A	0 / 0	0–0	–
Shanghai	NH		A	A	Q1	A	1R	A	Q2	0 / 1	0–1	0%
Paris	A	A	A	A	A	A	2R	A	A	0 / 1	1–1	50%
Win–loss	0–0	0–0	0–0	0–0	0–0	0–0	1–2	0–1	0–0	0 / 3	1–3	25%
