= Timo Nieminen =

Finnish tennis player (born 1981)

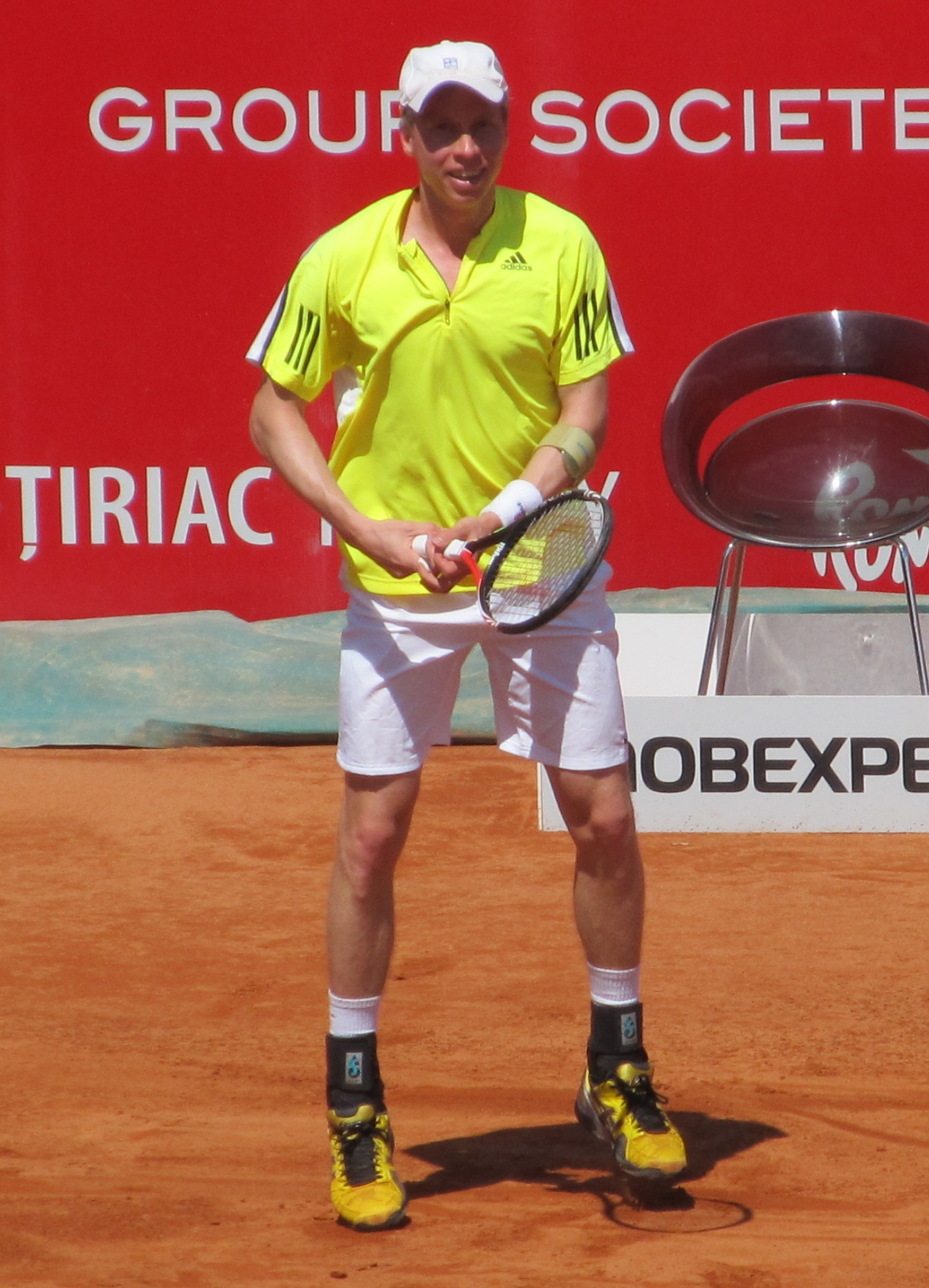
- Timo Nieminen at the 2012 BRD Năstase Țiriac Trophy
- Country (sports): Finland
- Residence: Vantaa, Finland
- Born: 6 October 1981 (age 45) Helsinki, Finland
- Height: 1.85 m (6 ft 1 in)
- Turned pro: 2000
- Retired: 2013
- Plays: Right-handed (two-handed backhand)
- Prize money: $167,767

Singles
- Career record: 2–10 (at ATP Tour level, Grand Slam level, and in Davis Cup)
- Career titles: 0
- Highest ranking: No. 254 (21 July 2003)

Doubles
- Career record: 0–0 (at ATP Tour level, Grand Slam level, and in Davis Cup)
- Career titles: 0
- Highest ranking: No. 318 (5 July 2004)

Timo Nieminen (born 6 October 1981 in Helsinki) is a retired professional Finnish tennis player.

He reached his highest ATP Tour singles ranking of World No. 254 in July 2003. Nieminen primarily played on the Futures circuit and the Challenger circuit. He has been a member of the Finland Davis Cup team since 2002, posting a 2–12 record in singles and 0–1 record in doubles in 12 ties.

He has no relation to Jarkko Nieminen.

== Tour singles titles - all levels (16) ==
Legend (singles)
Grand Slam (0)
Tennis Masters Cup (0)
ATP Masters Series (0)
ATP Tour (0)
Challengers (0)
Futures (16)

No.	Date	Tournament	Surface	Opponent in the final	Score
1.	2002	(Latvia) Jūrmala	Clay	(Russia) Andrei Cherkasov	4–6, 6–4, 6–2
2.	2003	(Finland) Savitaipale	Clay	(Russia) Michail Elgin	6–3, 6–4
3.	2003	(Finland) Vierumäki	Hard	(Estonia) Mait Künnap	6–3, 6–2
4.	2003	(Sweden) Gothenburg	Hard (i)	(Sweden) Robert Lindstedt	6–2, 4–6, 6–1
5.	2006	(Poland) Kraków	Clay	(Germany) Julian Reister	2–6, 6–3, 6–1
6.	2007	(Australia) Sydney	Hard	(Chinese Taipei) Ti Chen	7–5, 6–4
7.	2008	(Norway) Oslo	Clay	(Norway) Stian Boretti	6–3, 6–4
8.	2009	(Finland) Vierumäki	Clay	(Finland) Juho Paukku	7–5, 2–6, 6–4
9.	2009	(Sweden) Lidköping	Hard (i)	(Denmark) Frederik Nielsen	6–2, 6–2
10.	2010	(Netherlands) Alkmaar	Clay	(Czech Republic) Michal Schmid	6–1, 6–3
11.	2010	(Lithuania) Vilnius	Clay	(Latvia) Deniss Pavlovs	7–5, 6–2
12.	2010	(Germany) Leimen	Hard (i)	(Germany) Holger Fischer	6–3, 7–5
13.	2011	(Sweden) Båstad	Clay	(Romania) Cătălin Gârd	6–3, 6–7, 6–4
14.	2011	(Finland) Vierumäki	Clay	(Estonia) Vladimir Ivanov	6–3, 6–1
15.	2011	(Germany) Isernhagen	Hard (i)	(Germany) Peter Torebko	6–2, 6–4
16.	2012	(Sweden) Båstad	Clay	(France) Lucas Pouille	2–6, 7–5, 6–2

== See also ==
- List of Finland Davis Cup team representatives
