= IPP Open =

ATP Challenger Tour
- Tour: ATP Challenger Tour
- Location: Helsinki, Finland
- Venue: Tali Tennis Center
- Surface: Hard (indoor)
- Prize money: €42,500

The IPP Open was a tennis tournament held in Helsinki, Finland, since 2001. The event was part of the ATP Challenger Tour and was played on indoor hardcourts.

== Past finals ==
=== Singles ===
Year	Champion	Runner-up	Score
2014	(Estonia) Jürgen Zopp	(Israel) Dudi Sela	6–4, 5–7, 7–6^{(8–6)}
2013	(Finland) Jarkko Nieminen	(Lithuania) Ričardas Berankis	6–3, 6–1
2012	(Slovakia) Lukáš Lacko	(Finland) Jarkko Nieminen	6–3, 6–4
2011	(Germany) Daniel Brands	(Germany) Matthias Bachinger	7–6^{(7–2)}, 7–6^{(7–5)}
2010	(Lithuania) Ričardas Berankis	(Poland) Michał Przysiężny	6–1, 2–0, retired
2009	(Poland) Michał Przysiężny	(Switzerland) Stéphane Bohli	4–6, 6–4, 6–1
2008	(Russia) Dmitry Tursunov	(Slovakia) Karol Beck	6–4, 6–3
2007	(Belgium) Steve Darcis	(Germany) Tobias Kamke	6–3, 1–6, 6–4
2006	(Germany) Michael Berrer	(Czech Republic) Tomáš Zíb	6–2, 3–6, 6–3
2005	(Sweden) Björn Rehnquist	(Czech Republic) Tomáš Cakl	7–6^{(7–2)} 7–6^{(7–4)}
2004	(Netherlands) Peter Wessels	(Czech Republic) Lukáš Dlouhý	4–6, 6–4, 6–3
2003	(Italy) Davide Sanguinetti	(Sweden) Robin Söderling	6–4, 7–6^{(7–4)}
2002	(Finland) Jarkko Nieminen	(Croatia) Lovro Zovko	7–5, 4–6, 7–5
2001	(Switzerland) George Bastl	(Czech Republic) Ota Fukárek	6–4, 4–6, 6–4

=== Doubles ===
Year	Champions	Runners-up	Score
2014	(Finland) Henri Kontinen (Finland) Jarkko Nieminen	(United Kingdom) Jonathan Marray (Germany) Philipp Petzschner	7–6^{(7–2)}, 6–4
2013	(Finland) Henri Kontinen (Finland) Jarkko Nieminen	(Germany) Dustin Brown (Germany) Philipp Marx	7–5, 5–7, [10–5]
2012	(Russia) Mikhail Elgin (Slovakia) Igor Zelenay	(Belarus) Uladzimir Ignatik (Chinese Taipei) Jimmy Wang	4–6, 7–6^{(7–0)}, [10–4]
2011	(Germany) Martin Emmrich (Sweden) Andreas Siljeström	(United States) James Cerretani (Slovakia) Michal Mertiňák	6–4, 6–4
2010	(Germany) Dustin Brown (Germany) Martin Emmrich	(Finland) Henri Kontinen (Finland) Jarkko Nieminen	7–6^{(19–17)}, 0–6, [10–7]
2009	(India) Rohan Bopanna (Pakistan) Aisam-ul-Haq Qureshi	(Finland) Henri Kontinen (Finland) Jarkko Nieminen	6–2, 7–6^{(9–7)}
2008	(Poland) Łukasz Kubot (Austria) Oliver Marach	(United States) Eric Butorac (Croatia) Lovro Zovko	6–7^{(2–7)}, 7–6^{(9–7)}, [10–6]
2007	(Russia) Michail Elgin (Russia) Alexandre Kudryavtsev	(Finland) Harri Heliövaara (Finland) Henri Kontinen	4–6, 7–5, [13–11]
2006	(Netherlands) Martijn van Haasteren (Netherlands) Jasper Smit	(Latvia) Ernests Gulbis (Latvia) Deniss Pavlovs	7–6^{(8–6)}, 6–2
2005	(Switzerland) Yves Allegro (Germany) Michael Kohlmann	(Germany) Christopher Kas (Germany) Philipp Petzschner	4–6, 6–1, 6–4
2004	(Sweden) Robert Lindstedt (Taiwan) Lu Yen-hsun	(Italy) Gianluca Bazzica (Italy) Massimo Dell'Acqua	6–2, 6–2
2003	(Sweden) Robert Lindstedt (Sweden) Robin Söderling	(Croatia) Roko Karanušić (Serbia and Montenegro) Janko Tipsarević	6–3, 6–7^{(2–7)}, 6–1
2002	(Croatia) Mario Ančić (Croatia) Lovro Zovko	(North Macedonia) Aleksandar Kitinov (United States) Jim Thomas	7–6, 4–6, 6–3
2001	(Australia) Tim Crichton (United States) Jim Thomas	(North Macedonia) Aleksandar Kitinov (United States) Jack Waite	6–3, 6–4
