= 2022 Liepāja Open – Doubles =

Doubles
- 2022 Liepāja Open

Final
- Champions: (Slovenia) Dalila Jakupović (Serbia) Ivana Jorović
- Runners-up: (United Kingdom) Emily Appleton (India) Prarthana Thombare
- Score: 6–4, 6–3

Events
Singles	Doubles
← 2021 ·	Liepāja Open	· 2023 →

Akgul Amanmuradova and Valentina Ivakhnenko were the defending champions but chose not to participate.

Dalila Jakupović and Ivana Jorović won the title, defeating Emily Appleton and Prarthana Thombare in the final, 6–4, 6–3.

== Seeds ==
1. (Greece) Valentini Grammatikopoulou / (Ukraine) Valeriya Strakhova (first round)
2. (Slovenia) Veronika Erjavec / (Slovenia) Nika Radišić (first round)
3. (United Kingdom) Emily Appleton / (India) Prarthana Thombare (final)
4. (Latvia) Darja Semenistaja / (Latvia) Daniela Vismane (quarterfinals, withdrew)

== Draw ==
=== Key ===
- Q = Qualifier
- WC = Wild card
- LL = Lucky loser
- Alt = Alternate
- SE = Special exempt
- PR = Protected ranking
- ITF = ITF entry
- JE = Junior exempt
- w/o = Walkover
- r = Retired
- d = Defaulted
- SR = Special ranking

=== Draw ===
First round
1	(Greece) V Grammatikopoulou (Ukraine) V Strakhova	2	6^{4}
(Slovenia) D Jakupović (Serbia) I Jorović	6	7^{7}
Alt	(Ukraine) M Kolb (Ukraine) N Kolb	6^{2}	0
(Indonesia) B Gumulya (China) X You	7^{7}	6
4	(Latvia) D Semenistaja (Latvia) D Vismane	6	4	[10]
(Serbia) T Čurović (Estonia) E Malõgina	4	6	[6]
WC	(Latvia) P Špaka (Latvia) E Tomase	6	6
WC	(Lithuania) K Bubelytė (Lithuania) P Paukštytė	4	2
(China) Jin Lu (China) Y Yuan	6	6
(France) O Babel (France) L Nguyen Tan	3	3
(Czech Republic) A Laboutková (France) M Partaud	4	5
3	(United Kingdom) E Appleton (India) P Thombare	6	7
(Spain) I Burillo Escorihuela (Turkey) Ç Büyükakçay	2	3
(Israel) N Khirin (Slovakia) R Zelníčková	6	6
(Bosnia and Herzegovina) N Berberović (Italy) M Colmegna	4	6	[10]
2	(Slovenia) V Erjavec (Slovenia) N Radišić	6	0	[8]

Quarterfinals
(Slovenia) D Jakupović (Serbia) I Jorović	6	6
(Indonesia) B Gumulya (China) X You	4	2
4	(Latvia) D Semenistaja (Latvia) D Vismane
WC	(Latvia) P Špaka (Latvia) E Tomase	w/o
(China) Jin Lu (China) Y Yuan	6	2	[6]
3	(United Kingdom) E Appleton (India) P Thombare	4	6	[10]
(Israel) N Khirin (Slovakia) R Zelníčková	4	4
(Bosnia and Herzegovina) N Berberović (Italy) M Colmegna	6	6

Semifinals
(Slovenia) D Jakupović (Serbia) I Jorović	6	6
WC	(Latvia) P Špaka (Latvia) E Tomase	0	4
3	(United Kingdom) E Appleton (India) P Thombare	6	6
(Bosnia and Herzegovina) N Berberović (Italy) M Colmegna	3	4

Final
(Slovenia) D Jakupović (Serbia) I Jorović	6	6
3	(United Kingdom) E Appleton (India) P Thombare	4	3
