= 2023 Liepāja Open =

Tennis tournament

- Date: 3–9 July 2023
- Edition: 4th
- Category: ITF Women's World Tennis Tour
- Prize money: $60,000
- Surface: Clay / Outdoor
- Location: Liepāja, Latvia

Champions

Singles
- (Latvia) Darja Semeņistaja

Doubles
- (Latvia) Darja Semeņistaja / (Latvia) Daniela Vismane
← 2022 ·	Liepāja Open	· 2024 →

The 2023 Liepāja Open was a professional tennis tournament played on outdoor clay courts. It was the fourth edition of the tournament, which was part of the 2023 ITF Women's World Tennis Tour. It took place in Liepāja, Latvia, between 3 and 9 July 2023.

== Champions ==
=== Singles ===
- (Latvia) Darja Semeņistaja def. (United States) Jessie Aney, 6–4, 6–4

=== Doubles ===
- (Latvia) Darja Semeņistaja / (Latvia) Daniela Vismane def. (Turkey) Çağla Büyükakçay / (North Macedonia) Lina Gjorcheska, 6–4, 2–6, [10–3]

== Singles main draw entrants ==
=== Seeds ===
Country	Player	Rank	Seed
ESP	Aliona Bolsova	117	1
KOR	Jang Su-jeong	122	2
HUN	Réka Luca Jani	155	3
GRE	Valentini Grammatikopoulou	164	4
CRO	Petra Marčinko	195	5
GER	Mona Barthel	201	6
CZE	Lucie Havlíčková	205	7
LAT	Darja Semeņistaja	208	8
TUR	İpek Öz	217	9
ESP	Irene Burillo Escorihuela	238	10
MKD	Lina Gjorcheska	247	11
TUR	Çağla Büyükakçay	254	12
CRO	Jana Fett	257	13
ROU	Cristina Dinu	283	14
UKR	Valeriya Strakhova	303	15
EST	Elena Malõgina	322	16

- Rankings are as of 26 June 2023.

=== Other entrants ===
The following players received wildcards into the singles main draw:

- (Latvia) Adelina Lachinova
- (Latvia) Rebeka Margareta Mertena
- (Latvia) Anna Ozerova
- (Latvia) Patrīcija Špaka
- (Latvia) Beatrise Zeltiņa

The following players received entry from the qualifying draw:

- (Lithuania) Klaudija Bubelytė
- (Romania) Sabina Dadaciu
- (Germany) Sina Herrmann
- (Ukraine) Kateryna Lazarenko
- (Slovenia) Nika Radišić
- (Switzerland) Sebastianna Scilipoti
- (Germany) Natalia Siedliska
- (Germany) Emily Welker
