= 2022 Liepāja Open =

Tennis tournament

- Date: 11–17 July 2022
- Edition: 3rd
- Category: ITF Women's World Tennis Tour
- Prize money: $60,000
- Surface: Clay / Outdoor
- Location: Liepāja, Latvia

Champions

Singles
- (United States) Emma Navarro

Doubles
- (Slovenia) Dalila Jakupović / (Serbia) Ivana Jorović
← 2021 ·	Liepāja Open	· 2023 →

The 2022 Liepāja Open was a professional tennis tournament played on outdoor clay courts. It was the third edition of the tournament which was part of the 2022 ITF Women's World Tennis Tour. It took place in Liepāja, Latvia between 11 and 17 July 2022.

== Champions ==
=== Singles ===
- (United States) Emma Navarro def. (China) Yuan Yue, 6–4, 6–4

=== Doubles ===
- (Slovenia) Dalila Jakupović / (Serbia) Ivana Jorović def. (United Kingdom) Emily Appleton / (India) Prarthana Thombare, 6–4, 6–3

== Singles main draw entrants ==
=== Seeds ===
Country	Player	Rank^{1}	Seed
NED	Arantxa Rus	86	1
CHN	Yuan Yue	152	2
GRE	Valentini Grammatikopoulou	187	3
JPN	Kurumi Nara	246	4
USA	Emma Navarro	253	5
CZE	Anna Sisková	256	6
BIH	Nefisa Berberović	270	7
LAT	Daniela Vismane	271	8

- ^{1} Rankings are as of 27 June 2022.

=== Other entrants ===
The following players received wildcards into the singles main draw:

- (Estonia) Maileen Nuudi
- (Latvia) Patrīcija Špaka
- (Latvia) Elza Tomase
- (Latvia) Beatrise Zeltiņa

The following players received entry from the qualifying draw:

- (France) Océane Babel
- (Lithuania) Klaudija Bubelytė
- (Turkey) Çağla Büyükakçay
- (Italy) Martina Colmegna
- (Slovenia) Veronika Erjavec
- (Israel) Nicole Khirin
- (Estonia) Elena Malõgina
- (Germany) Luisa Meyer auf der Heide
