= 2022 Billie Jean King Cup Europe/Africa Zone Group II – Pool B =

Subsection of tennis competition

Pool B of the 2022 Billie Jean King Cup Europe/Africa Zone Group II was one of two pools in the Europe/Africa zone of the 2020–21 Billie Jean King Cup. Four teams competed in a round robin competition, with the top teams and the bottom teams proceeding to their respective sections of the play-offs: the top teams played for advancement to Group I in 2023.

== Standings ==
		LTU	ISR	LUX	FIN	RR; W–L	Set; W–L	Game; W–L	Standings
7	Lithuania		3–0	3–0	3–0	9–0	18–3 (86%)	122–42 (74%)	1
6	Israel	0–3		2–1	2–1	4–5	12–10 (55%)	104–97 (52%)	2
2	Luxembourg	0–3	1–2		2–1	3–6	7–13 (35%)	68–105 (61%)	3
3	Finland	0–3	1–2	1–2		2–7	4–15 (21%)	54–104 (34%)	4

Standings are determined by: 1. number of wins; 2. number of matches; 3. in two-team ties, head-to-head records; 4. in three-team ties, (a) percentage of matches won (head-to-head records if two teams remain tied), then (b) percentage of sets won (head-to-head records if two teams remain tied), then (c) percentage of games won (head-to-head records if two teams remain tied), then (d) Billie Jean King Cup rankings.

== Round-robin ==
=== Luxembourg vs. Israel ===
Luxembourg
1
Vierumäki, Finland
12 April 2022
Hard (i)

Israel
2

			1	2	3
1	(Luxembourg) (Israel)	Marie Weckerle; Nicole Khirin	3; 6	0; 6
2	(Luxembourg) (Israel)	Mandy Minella; Lina Glushko	4; 6	7; 5	7; 5
3	(Luxembourg) (Israel)	Mandy Minella / Claudine Schaul; Lina Glushko / Shavit Kimchi	1; 6	6^{4} 7^{7}

=== Finland vs. Lithuania ===
Finland
0
Vierumäki, Finland
12 April 2022
Hard (i)

Lithuania
3

			1	2	3
1	(Finland) (Lithuania)	Ella Haavisto; Andrė Lukošiūtė	1; 6	1; 6
2	(Finland) (Lithuania)	Venla Ahti; Justina Mikulskytė	2; 6	0; 6
3	(Finland) (Lithuania)	Stella Remander / Piia Suomalainen; Klaudija Bubelytė / Patricija Paukštytė	3; 6	0; 1		retired

=== Luxembourg vs. Lithuania ===
Luxembourg
0
Vierumäki, Finland
13 April 2022
Hard (i)

Lithuania
3

			1	2	3
1	(Luxembourg) (Lithuania)	Marie Weckerle; Andrė Lukošiūtė	0; 6	6; 4	1; 6
2	(Luxembourg) (Lithuania)	Mandy Minella; Justina Mikulskytė	0; 1			retired
3	(Luxembourg) (Lithuania)	Erna Brdarevic / Claudine Schaul; Klaudija Bubelytė / Patricija Paukštytė	1; 6	0; 6

=== Finland vs. Israel ===
Finland
1
Vierumäki, Finland
13 April 2022
Hard (i)

Israel
2

			1	2	3
1	(Finland) (Israel)	Stella Remander; Nicole Khirin	0; 6	1; 6
2	(Finland) (Israel)	Ella Haavisto; Shavit Kimchi	1; 6	6^{3} 7^{7}
3	(Finland) (Israel)	Venla Ahti / Stella Remander; Mika Dagan Fruchtman / Nicole Nadel	3; 6	6; 4	6; 1

=== Luxembourg vs. Finland ===
Luxembourg
2
Vierumäki, Finland
14 April 2022
Hard (i)

Finland
1

			1	2	3
1	(Luxembourg) (Finland)	Marie Weckerle; Ella Haavisto	6; 1	7^{7} 6^{4}
2	(Luxembourg) (Finland)	Mandy Minella; Venla Ahti	6; 2	6; 3
3	(Luxembourg) (Finland)	Erna Brdarevic / Claudine Schaul; Venla Ahti / Stella Remander	4; 6	3; 6

=== Lithuania vs. Israel ===
Lithuania
3
Vierumäki, Finland
14 April 2022
Hard (i)

Israel
0

			1	2	3
1	(Lithuania) (Israel)	Andrė Lukošiūtė; Nicole Khirin	6; 1	6^{6} 7^{8}	7^{7} 6^{1}
2	(Lithuania) (Israel)	Justina Mikulskytė; Lina Glushko	7^{7} 6^{5}	6; 0
3	(Lithuania) (Israel)	Klaudija Bubelytė / Patricija Paukštytė; Lina Glushko / Shavit Kimchi	6; 0	2; 6	6; 1
