= 2023 Liepāja Open – Doubles =

Doubles
- 2023 Liepāja Open

Final
- Champions: (Latvia) Darja Semeņistaja (Latvia) Daniela Vismane
- Runners-up: (Turkey) Çağla Büyükakçay (North Macedonia) Lina Gjorcheska
- Score: 6–4, 2–6, [10–3]

Events
Singles	Doubles
← 2022 ·	Liepāja Open	· 2024 →

Dalila Jakupović and Ivana Jorović were the defending champions but chose not to participate.

Darja Semeņistaja and Daniela Vismane won the title, defeating Çağla Büyükakçay and Lina Gjorcheska in the final, 6–4, 2–6, [10–3].

== Seeds ==
1. (Indonesia) Jessy Rompies / (Australia) Olivia Tjandramulia (quarterfinals)
2. (Germany) Vivian Heisen / (Ukraine) Valeriya Strakhova (semifinals)
3. (United States) Jessie Aney / (Estonia) Elena Malõgina (semifinals)
4. (Romania) Cristina Dinu / (Slovenia) Nika Radišić (quarterfinals)

== Draw ==
=== Key ===
- Q = Qualifier
- WC = Wild card
- LL = Lucky loser
- Alt = Alternate
- SE = Special exempt
- PR = Protected ranking
- ITF = ITF entry
- JE = Junior exempt
- w/o = Walkover
- r = Retired
- d = Defaulted
- SR = Special ranking

First round
1	(Indonesia) J Rompies (Australia) O Tjandramulia	6	7
WC	(Latvia) P Ungure Rogozoveca (Latvia) B Zeltiņa	3	5
(Turkey) Ç Büyükakçay (North Macedonia) L Gjorcheska	4	6	[11]
WC	(Latvia) M Ignatjeva (Latvia) A Ozerova	6	4	[9]
3	(United States) J Aney (Estonia) E Malõgina	6	6
(Czech Republic) I Šebestová (Netherlands) S Visscher	2	3
(Lithuania) K Bubelytė (Ukraine) O Oliynykova	6	3	[8]
(Malta) F Curmi (Malta) E Genovese	4	6	[10]
WC	(Latvia) RM Mertena (Latvia) P Špaka	6	2	[5]
(Latvia) D Semeņistaja (Latvia) D Vismane	4	6	[10]
(Slovakia) E Méri (Slovakia) S Milatová	1	1
4	(Romania) C Dinu (Slovenia) N Radišić	6	6
(Ukraine) M Kolb (Ukraine) N Kolb	2	7^{10}	[8]
(Italy) G Pedone (Italy) D Spiteri	6	6^{6}	[10]
(Bulgaria) L Karatancheva (Switzerland) S Scilipoti	6	4	[1]
2	(Germany) V Heisen (Ukraine) V Strakhova	3	6	[10]

Quarterfinals
1	(Indonesia) J Rompies (Australia) O Tjandramulia	5	4
(Turkey) Ç Büyükakçay (North Macedonia) L Gjorcheska	7	6
3	(United States) J Aney (Estonia) E Malõgina	6	6
(Malta) F Curmi (Malta) E Genovese	4	3
(Latvia) D Semeņistaja (Latvia) D Vismane	6	2	[11]
4	(Romania) C Dinu (Slovenia) N Radišić	4	6	[9]
(Italy) G Pedone (Italy) D Spiteri
2	(Germany) V Heisen (Ukraine) V Strakhova	w/o

Semifinals
(Turkey) Ç Büyükakçay (North Macedonia) L Gjorcheska	6	3	[10]
3	(United States) J Aney (Estonia) E Malõgina	3	6	[6]
(Latvia) D Semeņistaja (Latvia) D Vismane	7	6
2	(Germany) V Heisen (Ukraine) V Strakhova	5	2

Final
(Turkey) Ç Büyükakçay (North Macedonia) L Gjorcheska	4	6	[3]
(Latvia) D Semeņistaja (Latvia) D Vismane	6	2	[10]
