= 2022 Liepāja Open – Singles =

Singles
- 2022 Liepāja Open

Final
- Champion: (United States) Emma Navarro
- Runner-up: (China) Yuan Yue
- Score: 6–4, 6–4

Events
Singles	Doubles
← 2021 ·	Liepāja Open	· 2023 →

Daniela Vismane was the defending champion but retired in her first round match against Klaudija Bubelytė.

Emma Navarro won the title, defeating Yuan Yue in the final, 6–4, 6–4.

== Seeds ==
1. (Netherlands) Arantxa Rus (quarterfinals)
2. (China) Yuan Yue (final)
3. (Greece) Valentini Grammatikopoulou (quarterfinals)
4. (Japan) Kurumi Nara (second round)
5. (United States) Emma Navarro (champion)
6. (Czech Republic) Anna Sisková (semifinals)
7. (Bosnia and Herzegovina) Nefisa Berberović (quarterfinals)
8. (Latvia) Daniela Vismane (first round, retired)

== Draw ==
=== Key ===
- Q = Qualifier
- WC = Wild card
- LL = Lucky loser
- Alt = Alternate
- SE = Special exempt
- PR = Protected ranking
- ITF = ITF entry
- JE = Junior exempt
- w/o = Walkover
- r = Retired
- d = Defaulted
- SR = Special ranking

=== Finals ===
Semifinals
5	(United States) Emma Navarro	5	6	7
(Slovenia) Dalila Jakupović	7	3	5
6	(Czech Republic) Anna Sisková	3	4
2	(China) Yuan Yue	6	6

Final
5	(United States) Emma Navarro	6	6
2	(China) Yuan Yue	4	4

=== Top half ===
First round
1	(Netherlands) A Rus	7	6
Q	(Turkey) Ç Büyükakçay	5	0
(China) X You	3	6^{3}
(Norway) M Helgø	6	7^{7}
Q	(France) O Babel	4	3
(Spain) I Burillo Escorihuela	6	6
Q	(Germany) L Meyer auf der Heide	0	1
5	(United States) E Navarro	6	6
4	(Japan) K Nara	6	6
WC	(Latvia) E Tomase	3	4
(Ukraine) V Strakhova	3	6	1
(Slovenia) D Jakupović	6	4	6
(France) L Nguyen Tan	4	1
Q	(Italy) M Colmegna	6	6
Q	(Lithuania) K Bubelytė	3	6	5
8	(Latvia) D Vismane	6	3	4^{r}

Second round
1	(Netherlands) A Rus	6	6
(Norway) M Helgø	3	0
(Spain) I Burillo Escorihuela	4	3
5	(United States) E Navarro	6	6
4	(Japan) K Nara	4	1
(Slovenia) D Jakupović	6	6
Q	(Italy) M Colmegna	6	6
Q	(Lithuania) K Bubelytė	3	3

Quarterfinals
1	(Netherlands) A Rus	4	1
5	(United States) E Navarro	6	6
(Slovenia) D Jakupović	6^{6}	6	6
Q	(Italy) M Colmegna	7^{8}	3	3

Semifinals
5	(United States) E Navarro	5	6	7
(Slovenia) D Jakupović	7	3	5

=== Bottom half ===
First round
6	(Czech Republic) A Sisková	5	6	6
(Slovenia) N Radišić	7	3	2
(Italy) A Moratelli	6	6^{3}	4
(Latvia) D Semenistaja	4	7^{7}	1^{r}
WC	(Latvia) P Špaka	4	4
WC	(Latvia) B Zeltiņa	6	6
(France) M Partaud	6	3	6^{3}
3	(Greece) V Grammatikopoulou	4	6	7^{7}
7	(Bosnia and Herzegovina) N Berberović	6	6
Q	(Estonia) E Malõgina	1	3
(Burundi) S Nahimana	6	6
Q	(Israel) N Khirin	3	0
(Denmark) S Samavati	5	6	2
Q	(Slovenia) V Erjavec	7	4	6
WC	(Estonia) M Nuudi	4	3
2	(China) Y Yuan	6	6

Second round
6	(Czech Republic) A Sisková	6	5	6
(Italy) A Moratelli	1	7	4
WC	(Latvia) B Zeltiņa	1	1
3	(Greece) V Grammatikopoulou	6	6
7	(Bosnia and Herzegovina) N Berberović	6	6
(Burundi) S Nahimana	4	4
Q	(Slovenia) V Erjavec	6	2	4
2	(China) Y Yuan	2	6	6

Quarterfinals
6	(Czech Republic) A Sisková	7^{10}	7
3	(Greece) V Grammatikopoulou	6^{8}	5
7	(Bosnia and Herzegovina) N Berberović	5	2
2	(China) Y Yuan	7	6

Semifinals
6	(Czech Republic) A Sisková	3	4
2	(China) Y Yuan	6	6
