= 2023 ITF Women's World Tennis Tour =

Details
- Duration: 2 January – 31 December 2023
- Edition: 30th
- Categories: W100 tournaments W80 tournaments W60 tournaments W40 tournaments W25 tournaments W15 tournaments

Achievements (singles)
- Most titles: (Czech Republic) Brenda Fruhvirtová (Australia) Arina Rodionova (7)
- Most finals: (Australia) Arina Rodionova (10)

The 2023 International Tennis Federation (ITF) Women's World Tennis Tour is the entry-level and mid-level tour for women's professional tennis. It is organized by the International Tennis Federation and is a tier below the Women's Tennis Association (WTA) Tour. The Tour provides a professional pathway between the ITF Junior World Tennis Tour and the WTA Tour. The results of ITF tournaments are incorporated into the WTA ranking, which enables professionals to progress through to the elite levels of women's professional tennis. The ITF Women's World Tennis Tour offers approximately 500 tournaments across 65 countries and incorporates six prize money levels of tournaments: $15,000, $25,000, $40,000, $60,000, $80,000 and $100,000.

Tournaments at $15,000 level include reserved main draw places for Top-100 ranked ITF Juniors, providing a smooth pathway for the best new talent to break through into elite professional tennis. The ITF Women's World Tennis Tour is also designed to target prize money effectively to help reduce costs for players and ultimately enable more players to make a living.

From 1 March 2022, following the Russian invasion of Ukraine the ITF announced that players from Belarus and Russia could still play on the tour but would not be allowed to play under the flag of Belarus or Russia.

== Cancelled/postponed tournaments ==
The following tournaments were formally announced by the ITF before being subsequently cancelled or postponed due to the COVID-19 pandemic or other reasons.

Week of	Tournament	Status
January 9	Oberpullendorf, Austria; W15 – Hard (i)	Cancelled
January 30	Wesley Chapel, United States; W25 – Hard	Cancelled
April 17	Shymkent, Kazakhstan; W15 – Clay	Cancelled
April 24	Shymkent, Kazakhstan; W15 – Clay	Cancelled
May 1	Daytona Beach, United States; W25 – Clay	Cancelled
May 8	Atlanta, United States; W100 – Clay	Cancelled
May 8	Sarasota, United States; W25 – Clay	Cancelled
May 29	La Nucia, Spain; W25 – Clay	Cancelled
Jun 12	Jakarta, Indonesia; W25 – Hard	Cancelled
Jun 12	Bad Waltersdorf, Austria; W15 – Clay	Postponed to October 2nd
Jun 19	Denain, France; W25 – Clay	Cancelled
Aug 21	Gyeongsan, South Korea; W25 – Hard	Cancelled
Sep 18	Lubbock, United States; W15 – Hard	Cancelled
Oct 2	Henderson Tennis Open; Las Vegas, United States; W60 – Hard	Cancelled
Oct 9	Cherbourg-en-Cotentin, France; W25 – Hard (i)	Postponed to October 16th
Oct 9	Ra'anana, Israel; W15 – Hard	Cancelled due Gaza war
Oct 16	Jerusalem, Israel; W25 – Hard	Cancelled due Gaza war
Oct 23	Kiryat Motzkin, Israel; W25 – Hard	Cancelled due Gaza war
Oct 30	Atlanta, United States; W25 – Hard	Cancelled
Nov 27	Ramat Gan, Israel; W25 – Hard	Cancelled due Gaza war
Dec 4	Ramat Gan, Israel; W25 – Hard	Cancelled due Gaza war

== Participating host nations ==
- Argentina (ARG)
- Australia (AUS)
- Austria (AUT)
- Azerbaijan (AZE)
- Belgium (BEL)
- Bosnia and Herzegovina (BIH)
- Brazil (BRA)
- Bulgaria (BUL)
- Burundi (BDI)
- Canada (CAN)
- China (CHN)
- Colombia (COL)
- Croatia (CRO)
- Cyprus (CYP)
- Czech Republic (CZE)
- Denmark (DEN)
- Dominican Republic (DOM)
- Ecuador (ECU)
- Egypt (EGY)
- Estonia (EST)
- France (FRA)
- Finland (FIN)
- Georgia (GEO)
- Germany (GER)
- Great Britain (GBR)
- Greece (GRE)
- Hong Kong (HKG)
- India (IND)
- Indonesia (INA)
- Italy (ITA)
- Japan (JPN)
- Kazakhstan (KAZ)
- Kenya (KEN)
- Latvia (LAT)
- Malaysia (MAS)
- Mexico (MEX)
- Morocco (MAR)
- Netherlands (NED)
- New Zealand (NZL)
- North Macedonia (MKD)
- Peru (PER)
- Poland (POL)
- Portugal (POR)
- Romania (ROU)
- Serbia (SRB)
- Singapore (SGP)
- Slovakia (SVK)
- Slovenia (SLO)
- South Africa (RSA)
- South Korea (KOR)
- Spain (SPA)
- Sweden (SWE)
- Switzerland (SUI)
- Thailand (THA)
- Tunisia (TUN)
- Turkey (TUR)
- United States (USA)

== WTA ranking points distribution ==
Category	W	F	SF	QF	R16	R32	R64	Q	FQR	Q2	Q1
W100 (48S, 32Q)	140	85	50	25	13	7	1	6	4	–	–
W100 (32S, 32/24Q)	140	85	50	25	13	1	–	6	4	–	–
W100 (16D)	140	85	50	25	1	–	–	–	–	–	–
W80 (48S, 32Q)	115	70	42	21	10	6	1	5	3	–	–
W80 (32S, 32/24Q)	115	70	42	21	10	1	–	5	3	–	–
W80 (16D)	115	70	42	21	1	–	–	–	–	–	–
W60+H (48S, 32Q)	100	60	36	18	9	5	1	5	3	–	–
W60+H (32S, 32/24Q)	100	60	36	18	9	1	–	5	3	–	–
W60+H (32S, 48/64Q)	100	60	36	18	9	1	–	5	3	–	–
W60+H (16D)	100	60	36	18	1	–	–	–	–	–	–
W60 (48S, 32Q)	80	48	29	15	8	5	1	5	3	–	–
W60 (32S, 32/24Q)	80	48	29	15	8	1	–	5	3	–	–
W60 (16D)	80	48	29	15	1	–	–	–	–	–	–
W40/W40+H (48S, 32Q)	70	42	25	13	7	4	1	4	2	–	–
W40/W40+H (32S, 32/24Q)	70	42	25	13	7	1	–	4	2	–	–
W40/W40+H (16D)	70	42	25	13	–	–	–	–	–	–	–
W25+H (48S, 32Q)	60	36	22	11	6	3	1	2	–	–	–
W25+H (32S, 32/24Q)	60	36	22	11	6	1	–	2	–	–	–
W25+H (32S, 48/64Q)	60	36	22	11	6	1	–	2	–	–	–
W25+H (16D)	60	36	22	11	1	–	–	–	–	–	–
W25 (48S, 32Q)	50	30	18	9	5	3	1	1	–	–	–
W25 (32S, 32/24Q)	50	30	18	9	5	–	–	1	–	–	–
W25 (32S, 48/64Q)	50	30	18	9	5	–	–	1	–	–	–
W25 (16D)	50	30	18	9	1	–	–	–	–	–	–
W15/W15+H (32S, 32/24Q)	10	6	4	2	1	–	–	–	–	–	–
W15/W15+H (32S, 48/64Q)	10	6	4	2	1	–	–	–	–	–	–
W15/W15+H (16D)	10	6	4	1	–	–	–	–	–	–	–

- "+H" indicates that hospitality is provided.

== Statistics ==
=== Key ===
Category
W100 tournaments
W80 tournaments
W60 tournaments
W40 tournaments
W25 tournaments
W15 tournaments

These tables present the number of singles (S) and doubles (D) titles won by each player and each nation during the season. The players/nations are sorted by:

1. Total number of titles (a doubles title won by two players representing the same nation counts as only one win for the nation)
2. A singles > doubles hierarchy
3. Alphabetical order (by family names for players).

To avoid confusion and double counting, these tables should be updated only after all events of the week are completed.

=== Titles won by player ===
Updated as of 31 December

Total	Player	W100		W80		W60		W40		W25		W15		Total	
Total	Player	S	D	S	D	S	D	S	D	S	D	S	D	S	D
13	Valeriya Strakhova (UKR)						1		4	1	7			1	12
11	Makenna Jones (USA)		1				4			2	4			2	9
10	Destanee Aiava (AUS)					1	1			2	6			3	7
9	Guo Hanyu (CHN)		1						1	1	3	1	2	2	7
9	Veronika Erjavec (SLO)					1			2	3	3			4	5
9	Zhibek Kulambayeva (KAZ)						2		1		3	2	1	2	7
9	Katarína Kužmová (SVK)											4	5	4	5
8	Yanina Wickmayer (BEL)	2	1				3	1	1					3	5
8	Anastasia Tikhonova	1					5	1	1					2	6
8	Anna Sisková (CZE)						4		1		3			0	8
8	Francisca Jorge (POR)						2		1	1	4			1	7
8	Dominika Šalková (CZE)							1	2	2	3			3	5
8	Natalia Siedliska (GER)								1			2	5	2	6
8	Ana Candiotto (BRA)										1		7	0	8
7	Yulia Starodubtseva (UKR)		1			3	1			1	1			4	3
7	Valentini Grammatikopoulou (GRE)		1				1	1		2	2			3	4
7	Arina Rodionova (AUS)					2				5				7	0
7	Brenda Fruhvirtová (CZE)					1		4		2				7	0
7	Sofia Sewing (USA)						1		2		4			0	7
7	Anca Todoni (ROU)									2	1	2	2	4	3
7	Polina Iatcenko									1	1	2	3	3	4
7	Fanny Östlund (SWE)										4		3	0	7
7	Ayumi Koshiishi (JPN)										1	5	1	5	2
6	Olivia Gadecki (AUS)		2					1	1		2			1	5
6	Jamie Loeb (USA)		1				2			1	2			1	5
6	Darja Semeņistaja (LAT)					3	1	1			1			4	2
6	Talia Gibson (AUS)					1	3			1	1			2	4
6	Emina Bektas (USA)					1	2			1	2			2	4
6	Wang Yafan (CHN)					1	1	1		3				5	1
6	Sofya Lansere						3		1	1	1			1	5
6	Dalila Jakupović (SLO)						2		2	1	1			1	5
6	Daniela Vismane (LAT)						1		2		3			0	6
6	Jessie Aney (USA)						1		1		4			0	6
6	Matilde Jorge (POR)						1		1		4			0	6
6	Martyna Kubka (POL)						1				4	1		1	5
6	Ekaterine Gorgodze (GEO)								4	1	1			1	5
6	Aoi Ito (JPN)								1		2	1	2	1	5
6	Zheng Wushuang (CHN)								1			2	3	2	4
6	Martina Capurro Taborda (ARG)									5	1			5	1
6	Nika Radišić (SLO)										5		1	0	6
6	Li Yu-yun (TPE)										2		4	0	6
6	Leonie Küng (SUI)										1	2	3	2	4
6	Daria Lodikova											2	4	2	4
6	Sandra Samir (EGY)											2	4	2	4
5	Emma Navarro (USA)	2		1		1				1				5	0
5	Sophie Chang (USA)		3				2							0	5
5	Tímea Babos (HUN)		2							3				3	2
5	Mai Hontama (JPN)		1				3	1						1	4
5	Moyuka Uchijima (JPN)		1				2	1			1			1	4
5	Amina Anshba		1				2				2			0	5
5	Océane Dodin (FRA)					3		1		1				5	0
5	Greet Minnen (BEL)					1	3	1						2	3
5	Irina Bara (ROU)					1	2		1	1				2	3
5	Priscilla Hon (AUS)					1	2			1	1			2	3
5	Taylah Preston (AUS)					1				3	1			4	1
5	Weronika Falkowska (POL)						2			1	2			1	4
5	Dalayna Hewitt (USA)						1		1		3			0	5
5	Maia Lumsden (GBR)						1		1		3			0	5
5	Maria Mateas (USA)						1			1	3			1	4
5	Alexandra Bozovic (AUS)						1				4			0	5
5	Sarah Beth Grey (GBR)						1				4			0	5
5	Romina Ccuno (PER)						1				3		1	0	5
5	Yang Ya-yi (TPE)							1		3	1			4	1
5	Elena Pridankina								1		2	2		2	3
5	Linda Klimovičová (CZE)									2	2	1		3	2
5	Park So-hyun (KOR)									2	2	1		3	2
5	Julie Štruplová (CZE)									1	3	1		2	3
5	Anastasiia Gureva									1	2	1	1	2	3
5	Amarissa Kiara Tóth (HUN)										2	3		3	2
5	Ángela Fita Boluda (ESP)										1	3	1	3	2
5	Naho Sato (JPN)										1	2	2	2	3
5	Patcharin Cheapchandej (THA)											2	3	2	3
5	Anchisa Chanta (THA)											1	4	1	4
5	Selina Dal (GER)											1	4	1	4
5	Chantal Sauvant (GER)											1	4	1	4
5	Eleni Christofi (GRE)												5	0	5
5	Patricija Paukštytė (LTU)												5	0	5
4	Bai Zhuoxuan (CHN)	2								2				4	0
4	Jessika Ponchet (FRA)		1	1	1			1						2	2
4	Andreea Mitu (ROU)		1			1	1		1					1	3
4	Angelica Moratelli (ITA)		1				2				1			0	4
4	Eudice Chong (HKG)		1						2		1			0	4
4	Arianne Hartono (NED)		1						1	1	1			1	3
4	Jiang Xinyu (CHN)		1						1		2			0	4
4	Luksika Kumkhum (THA)		1								3			0	4
4	Céline Naef (SUI)			1				1	1	1				3	1
4	Jang Su-jeong (KOR)				1	1				1	1			2	2
4	Arantxa Rus (NED)				1			2	1					2	2
4	Julia Riera (ARG)				1					2	1			2	2
4	Astra Sharma (AUS)					1	1		2					1	3
4	Natsumi Kawaguchi (JPN)					1					1	2		3	1
4	Emily Appleton (GBR)						2		1		1			0	4
4	Irina Khromacheva						2		1		1			0	4
4	Alana Smith (USA)						2				2			0	4
4	Justina Mikulskytė (LTU)						1		1		2			0	4
4	Maddison Inglis (AUS)						1			1	2			1	3
4	Oana Gavrilă (ROU)						1				3			0	4
4	María Herazo González (COL)						1				3			0	4
4	Sapfo Sakellaridi (GRE)						1				3			0	4
4	Lanlana Tararudee (THA)							2				2		4	0
4	Ma Yexin (CHN)							1	2		1			1	3
4	Gabriela Knutson (CZE)							1		3				4	0
4	Stacey Fung (CAN)							1		2	1			3	1
4	Gao Xinyu (CHN)							1		1	2			2	2
4	Dejana Radanović (SRB)							1		1		1	1	3	1
4	Thasaporn Naklo (THA)							1				2	1	3	1
4	Cody Wong (HKG)								1	1	2			1	3
4	Naiktha Bains (GBR)								1		3			0	4
4	Erika Sema (JPN)								1		3			0	4
4	Kamilla Bartone (LAT)								1		1	1	1	1	3
4	Feng Shuo (CHN)								1		1		2	0	4
4	Solana Sierra (ARG)									3	1			3	1
4	Anastasia Zakharova									3	1			3	1
4	Sofia Costoulas (BEL)									2	2			2	2
4	Rutuja Bhosale (IND)									1	3			1	3
4	Lisa Pigato (ITA)									1	3			1	3
4	Angella Okutoyi (KEN)									1	1	1	1	2	2
4	Hanne Vandewinkel (BEL)									1	1	1	1	2	2
4	Shrivalli Bhamidipaty (IND)									1	1		2	1	3
4	Martina Colmegna (ITA)										4			0	4
4	Jenny Dürst (SUI)										3		1	0	4
4	Ksenia Laskutova										3		1	0	4
4	Guillermina Naya (ARG)										2	1	1	1	3
4	Punnin Kovapitukted (THA)										2		2	0	4
4	Ilinca Amariei (ROU)										1	3		3	1
4	Karola Bejenaru (ROU)										1	1	2	1	3
4	Antonia Schmidt (GER)										1	1	2	1	3
4	Lamis Alhussein Abdel Aziz (EGY)											4		4	0
4	Melisa Ercan (TUR)											4		4	0
4	Nina Radovanovic (FRA)											3	1	3	1
4	Alexandra Shubladze											3	1	3	1
4	Zeel Desai (IND)											2	2	2	2
4	Merel Hoedt (NED)											2	2	2	2
4	Ren Yufei (CHN)											2	2	2	2
4	Natalija Senić (SRB)											2	2	2	2
4	Tian Fangran (CHN)											2	2	2	2
4	Luca Udvardy (HUN)											2	2	2	2
4	Amelie Van Impe (BEL)											2	2	2	2
4	Elena-Teodora Cadar (ROU)												4	0	4
4	Marie Mettraux (SUI)												4	0	4
4	Marente Sijbesma (NED)												4	0	4
4	Daria Yesypchuk (UKR)												4	0	4
3	Alina Korneeva	1			1	1								2	1
3	Eri Hozumi (JPN)		2				1							0	3
3	Renata Zarazúa (MEX)		1			1				1				2	1
3	Hailey Baptiste (USA)		1			1					1			1	2
3	Camilla Rosatello (ITA)		1				2							0	3
3	Alicia Barnett (GBR)		1				1		1					0	3
3	Harriet Dart (GBR)		1						1	1				1	2
3	Whitney Osuigwe (USA)		1								2			0	3
3	Fiona Ferro (FRA)				1	1						1		2	1
3	Abigail Rencheli (USA)				1		1				1			0	3
3	Jana Kolodynska				1			2						2	1
3	Jaqueline Cristian (ROU)					2				1				3	0
3	Petra Marčinko (CRO)					2				1				3	0
3	Marina Stakusic (CAN)					2				1				3	0
3	Veronika Miroshnichenko					1	1		1					1	2
3	McCartney Kessler (USA)					1	1				1			1	2
3	María Carlé (ARG)					1		1		1				3	0
3	Elvina Kalieva (USA)					1			1	1				2	1
3	Marie Benoît (BEL)					1				2				3	0
3	Séléna Janicijevic (FRA)					1				2				3	0
3	Ella Seidel (GER)					1				2				3	0
3	Ali Collins (GBR)						3							0	3
3	Jesika Malečková (CZE)						2			1				1	2
3	Freya Christie (GBR)						2				1			0	3
3	Conny Perrin (SUI)						2				1			0	3
3	Lina Gjorcheska (MKD)						1	1	1					1	2
3	Fanny Stollár (HUN)						1			1	1			1	2
3	Elysia Bolton (AUS)						1				2			0	3
3	Ashley Lahey (USA)						1				2			0	3
3	Yuki Naito (JPN)						1				2			0	3
3	Lexie Stevens (NED)						1				2			0	3
3	Magali Kempen (BEL)							1	1		1			1	2
3	Hanna Chang (USA)							1		1		1		3	0
3	Aliona Falei							1		1			1	2	1
3	Isabella Shinikova (BUL)							1				1	1	2	1
3	Liang En-shuo (TPE)								3					0	3
3	Iryna Shymanovich								2		1			0	3
3	Ekaterina Makarova								1	1			1	1	2
3	Andreea Prisăcariu (ROU)								1	1			1	1	2
3	Cristina Dinu (ROU)								1		2			0	3
3	Maria Kozyreva								1		2			0	3
3	Lara Salden (BEL)								1		2			0	3
3	Tang Qianhui (CHN)								1		2			0	3
3	Haley Giavara (USA)								1			1	1	1	2
3	Radka Zelníčková (SVK)								1				2	0	3
3	Nikola Bartůňková (CZE)									3				2	0
3	Seone Mendez (AUS)									2	1			2	1
3	Ilona Georgiana Ghioroaie (ROU)									1	2			1	2
3	Katharina Hobgarski (GER)									1	2			1	2
3	Liv Hovde (USA)									1	2			1	2
3	Carolina Kuhl (GER)									1		2		3	0
3	Dimitra Pavlou (GRE)									1		1	1	2	1
3	Hiromi Abe (JPN)										3			0	3
3	Georgina García Pérez (ESP)										3			0	3
3	Petra Hule (AUS)										3			0	3
3	Lauryn John-Baptiste (GBR)										3			0	3
3	Rasheeda McAdoo (USA)										3			0	3
3	Victoria Rodríguez (MEX)										3			0	3
3	Reese Brantmeier (USA)										2	1		1	2
3	Maryna Kolb (UKR)										2		1	0	3
3	Nadiia Kolb (UKR)										2		1	0	3
3	Tsao Chia-yi (TPE)										2		1	0	3
3	Anastasia Abbagnato (ITA)										1	1	1	1	2
3	Vaidehi Chaudhari (IND)										1	1	1	1	2
3	Mara Guth (GER)										1	1	1	1	2
3	Elena Milovanović (SRB)										1	1	1	1	2
3	Katarína Strešnaková (SVK)										1	1	1	1	2
3	Mariia Tkacheva										1	1	1	1	2
3	Lisa Zaar (SWE)										1	1	1	1	2
3	Lily Fairclough (AUS)										1		2	0	3
3	Mio Mushika (JPN)										1		2	0	3
3	Ekaterina Ovcharenko										1		2	0	3
3	Stéphanie Judith Visscher (NED)										1		2	0	3
3	Wang Jiaqi (CHN)										1		2	0	3
3	Tamara Čurović (SRB)											3		3	0
3	Michaela Laki (GRE)											3		3	0
3	Valeriya Yushchenko											3		3	0
3	Carson Branstine (CAN)											2	1	2	1
3	Jazmin Ortenzi (ARG)											2	1	2	1
3	Anastasiya Soboleva (UKR)											2	1	2	1
3	Kim Da-bin (KOR)											1	2	1	2
3	Liu Fangzhou (CHN)											1	2	1	2
3	Andrė Lukošiūtė (LTU)											1	2	1	2
3	Ayumi Miyamoto (JPN)											1	2	1	2
3	Ekaterina Shalimova											1	2	1	2
3	Kristiana Sidorova											1	2	1	2
3	Anja Stanković (SRB)											1	2	1	2
3	Demi Tran (NED)											1	2	1	2
3	Stefani Webb (AUS)											1	2	1	2
3	Tilwith Di Girolami (BEL)												3	0	3
3	Louise Kwong (CAN)												3	0	3
3	Matilde Mariani (ITA)												3	0	3
3	Anastasia Sukhotina												3	0	3
3	Doğa Türkmen (TUR)												3	0	3
3	Anna Ulyashchenko (USA)												3	0	3
3	Arina Vasilescu (ROU)												3	0	3
2	Kayla Day (USA)	2												2	0
2	Viktorija Golubic (SUI)	2												2	0
2	Viktoriya Tomova (BUL)	1		1										2	0
2	Daria Snigur (UKR)	1				1								2	0
2	Yuan Yue (CHN)	1					1							1	1
2	Bibiane Schoofs (NED)		1		1									0	2
2	Anna Bondár (HUN)		1			1								1	1
2	Olivia Nicholls (GBR)		1				1							0	2
2	Kristina Mladenovic (FRA)		1						1					0	2
2	Jaimee Fourlis (AUS)		1							1				1	1
2	Nao Hibino (JPN)		1							1				1	1
2	Ulrikke Eikeri (NOR)		1								1			0	2
2	Taylor Townsend (USA)			1		1								2	0
2	Lulu Sun (SUI)			1			1							1	1
2	Tatiana Prozorova				1	1								1	1
2	Carolina Alves (BRA)				1					1				1	1
2	Han Na-lae (KOR)				1						1			0	2
2	Mirra Andreeva					2								2	0
2	Yuliya Hatouka					1	1							1	1
2	Robin Montgomery (USA)					1	1							1	1
2	Katarina Zavatska (UKR)					1		1						2	0
2	Lucie Havlíčková (CZE)					1			1					1	1
2	Julia Avdeeva					1				1				2	0
2	Kimberly Birrell (AUS)					1				1				2	0
2	Caroline Dolehide (USA)					1				1				2	0
2	Tena Lukas (CRO)					1				1				2	0
2	Katherine Sebov (CAN)					1				1				2	0
2	Peyton Stearns (USA)					1				1				2	0
2	Francesca Di Lorenzo (USA)						2							0	2
2	Julia Lohoff (GER)						2							0	2
2	Christina Rosca (USA)						2							0	2
2	Polina Kudermetova						1	1						1	1
2	Alena Fomina-Klotz						1		1					0	2
2	Erina Hayashi (JPN)						1		1					0	2
2	Tayisiya Morderger (GER)						1		1					0	2
2	Yana Morderger (GER)						1		1					0	2
2	Prarthana Thombare (IND)						1		1					0	2
2	Estelle Cascino (FRA)						1				1			0	2
2	Lina Glushko (ISR)						1				1			0	2
2	Maria Kononova						1				1			0	2
2	Yuriko Miyazaki (GBR)						1				1			0	2
2	Eden Silva (GBR)						1				1			0	2
2	Marie Weckerle (LUX)						1				1			0	2
2	Berfu Cengiz (TUR)							1	1					1	1
2	Gergana Topalova (BUL)							1	1					1	1
2	Sinja Kraus (AUT)							1		1				2	0
2	Antonia Ružić (CRO)							1		1				2	0
2	Rebecca Šramková (SVK)							1		1				2	0
2	Lucrezia Stefanini (ITA)							1		1				2	0
2	Darya Astakhova							1			1			1	1
2	Andrea Gámiz (VEN)								2					0	2
2	Ankita Raina (IND)								2					0	2
2	Wei Sijia (CHN)								1	1				1	1
2	Gabriella Da Silva-Fick (AUS)								1		1			0	2
2	Saki Imamura (JPN)								1		1			0	2
2	Momoko Kobori (JPN)								1		1			0	2
2	Samantha Murray Sharan (GBR)								1		1			0	2
2	Sada Nahimana (BDI)								1		1			0	2
2	Alexandra Osborne (AUS)								1		1			0	2
2	Ayano Shimizu (JPN)								1		1			0	2
2	Cho I-hsuan (TPE)								1				1	0	2
2	Cho Yi-tsen (TPE)								1				1	0	2
2	Sára Bejlek (CZE)									2				2	0
2	Alina Charaeva									2				2	0
2	Alexandra Eala (PHI)									2				2	0
2	Joanna Garland (TPE)									2				2	0
2	Victoria Jiménez Kasintseva (AND)									2				2	0
2	Sonay Kartal (GBR)									2				2	0
2	Carlota Martínez Círez (ESP)									2				2	0
2	Alice Robbe (FRA)									2				2	0
2	Margaux Rouvroy (FRA)									2				2	0
2	Haruna Arakawa (JPN)									1	1			1	1
2	Mariam Bolkvadze (GEO)									1	1			1	1
2	Nuria Brancaccio (ITA)									1	1			1	1
2	Katarina Kozarov (SRB)									1	1			1	1
2	Suzan Lamens (NED)									1	1			1	1
2	Guiomar Maristany (ESP)									1	1			1	1
2	Misaki Matsuda (JPN)									1	1			1	1
2	Veronika Podrez (UKR)									1		1		2	0
2	Valentina Ryser (SUI)									1		1		2	0
2	Fiona Crawley (USA)									1			1	1	1
2	Diāna Marcinkēviča (LAT)									1			1	1	1
2	Martha Matoula (GRE)									1			1	1	1
2	Diletta Cherubini (ITA)										2			0	2
2	Anastasia Gasanova										2			0	2
2	Jasmijn Gimbrère (NED)										2			0	2
2	Jada Hart (USA)										2			0	2
2	Mana Kawamura (JPN)										2			0	2
2	Yasmine Mansouri (FRA)										2			0	2
2	Luisa Meyer auf der Heide (GER)										2			0	2
2	Clervie Ngounoue (USA)										2			0	2
2	Anita Wagner (BIH)										2			0	2
2	Ekaterina Yashina										2			0	2
2	Tiphanie Lemaître (FRA)										1	1		1	1
2	Emma Léné (FRA)										1	1		1	1
2	Dalila Spiteri (ITA)										1	1		1	1
2	Wang Meiling (CHN)										1	1		1	1
2	Anna Zyryanova										1	1		1	1
2	Yvonne Cavallé Reimers (ESP)										1		1	0	2
2	Eryn Cayetano (USA)										1		1	0	2
2	Nicole Fossa Huergo (ITA)										1		1	0	2
2	Denisa Hindová (CZE)										1		1	0	2
2	Katarina Jokić (SRB)										1		1	0	2
2	Fernanda Labraña (CHI)										1		1	0	2
2	Tea Lukic (GER)										1		1	0	2
2	Anri Nagata (JPN)										1		1	0	2
2	Chiara Scholl (USA)										1		1	0	2
2	Oana Georgeta Simion (ROU)										1		1	0	2
2	Joëlle Steur (GER)										1		1	0	2
2	Miriana Tona (ITA)										1		1	0	2
2	Back Da-yeon (KOR)											2		2	0
2	Yaroslava Bartashevich (FRA)											2		2	0
2	Diana Demidova											2		2	0
2	Daria Frayman (CYP)											2		2	0
2	Miho Kuramochi (JPN)											2		2	0
2	Milana Zhabrailova											2		2	0
2	Sophia Biolay (FRA)											1	1	1	1
2	Klaudija Bubelytė (LTU)											1	1	1	1
2	Sara Daavettila (USA)											1	1	1	1
2	Aya El Aouni (MAR)											1	1	1	1
2	Gina Feistel (POL)											1	1	1	1
2	Caijsa Hennemann (SWE)											1	1	1	1
2	Dasha Ivanova (USA)											1	1	1	1
2	Alisa Kummel											1	1	1	1
2	Rebecca Munk Mortensen (DEN)											1	1	1	1
2	Thaisa Grana Pedretti (BRA)											1	1	1	1
2	Lucía Peyre (ARG)											1	1	1	1
2	Angelica Raggi (ITA)											1	1	1	1
2	Tiantsoa Sarah Rakotomanga Rajaonah (FRA)											1	1	1	1
2	Mell Reasco González (ECU)											1	1	1	1
2	Anastasia Safta (ROU)											1	1	1	1
2	Sebastianna Scilipoti (SUI)											1	1	1	1
2	Darya Shauha											1	1	1	1
2	Anja Wildgruber (GER)											1	1	1	1
2	Wu Ho-ching (HKG)											1	1	1	1
2	Ioana Zvonaru (ROU)											1	1	1	1
2	Abigail Amos (GBR)												2	0	2
2	Polina Bakhmutkina												2	0	2
2	Monique Barry (AUS)												2	0	2
2	Ștefania Bojică (ROU)												2	0	2
2	Evgeniya Burdina												2	0	2
2	Astrid Cirotte (FRA)												2	0	2
2	Rikke de Koning (NED)												2	0	2
2	Salma Drugdová (SVK)												2	0	2
2	Virginia Ferrara (ITA)												2	0	2
2	Mara Gae (ROU)												2	0	2
1	Madelief Hageman (NED)												2	0	2
2	Katharina Hering (GER)												2	0	2
2	Hsu Chieh-yu (TPE)												2	0	2
2	Katherine Hui (USA)												2	0	2
2	Anika Jašková (SVK)												2	0	2
2	Naïma Karamoko (SUI)												2	0	2
2	Kim Na-ri (KOR)												2	0	2
2	Lee Ya-hsin (TPE)												2	0	2
2	Emilie Lindh (GBR)												2	0	2
2	Ayşegül Mert (TUR)												2	0	2
2	Vittoria Modesti (ITA)												2	0	2
2	Inês Murta (POR)												2	0	2
2	Simona Ogescu (ROU)												2	0	2
2	Rinon Okuwaki (JPN)												2	0	2
2	Anastasiia Poplavska (UKR)												2	0	2
2	Aleksandra Pospelova												2	0	2
2	Camila Romero (ECU)												2	0	2
2	Anita Sahdiieva (UKR)												2	0	2
2	Linda Ševčíková (CZE)												2	0	2
2	Beatrice Stagno (ITA)												2	0	2
2	Katerina Tsygourova (SUI)												2	0	2
2	Chelsea Vanhoutte (BEL)												2	0	2
2	Mia Yamakita (USA)												2	0	2
2	Yang Yidi (CHN)												2	0	2
2	Kisa Yoshioka (JPN)												2	0	2
2	Joanna Zawadzka (POL)												2	0	2
2	Rada Zolotareva												2	0	2
1	Elina Avanesyan	1												1	0
1	Mirjam Björklund (SWE)	1												1	0
1	Olga Danilović (SRB)	1												1	0
1	Magdalena Fręch (POL)	1												1	0
1	Julia Grabher (AUT)	1												1	0
1	Danka Kovinić (MNE)	1												1	0
1	Wang Xinyu (CHN)	1												1	0
1	Anastasia Dețiuc (CZE)		1											0	1
1	Angela Kulikov (USA)		1											0	1
1	Peangtarn Plipuech (THA)		1											0	1
1	Natalija Stevanović (SRB)		1											0	1
1	Marcela Zacarías (MEX)		1											0	1
1	Vera Zvonareva		1											0	1
1	Himeno Sakatsume (JPN)			1										1	0
1	Diane Parry (FRA)				1									0	1
1	Amelia Rajecki (GBR)				1									0	1
1	Nigina Abduraimova (UZB)					1								1	0
1	Aliona Bolsova (ESP)					1								1	0
1	Katie Boulter (GBR)					1								1	0
1	Jéssica Bouzas Maneiro (ESP)					1								1	0
1	Clara Burel (FRA)					1								1	0
1	Jodie Burrage (GBR)					1								1	0
1	Sara Errani (ITA)					1								1	0
1	Storm Hunter (AUS)					1								1	0
1	Kaia Kanepi (EST)					1								1	0
1	Sabine Lisicki (GER)					1								1	0
1	Victoria Mboko (CAN)					1								1	0
1	Chloé Paquet (FRA)					1								1	0
1	Laura Pigossi (BRA)					1								1	0
1	Kamilla Rakhimova					1								1	0
1	Mia Ristić (SRB)					1								1	0
1	Clara Tauson (DEN)					1								1	0
1	Karman Thandi (IND)					1								1	0
1	Robin Anderson (USA)						1							0	1
1	Alexis Blokhina (USA)						1							0	1
1	Maja Chwalińska (POL)						1							0	1
1	Fernanda Contreras Gómez (MEX)						1							0	1
1	Carmen Corley (USA)						1							0	1
1	Ivana Corley (USA)						1							0	1
1	Ingrid Gamarra Martins (BRA)						1							0	1
1	Roisin Gilheany (AUS)						1							0	1
1	Isabelle Haverlag (NED)						1							0	1
1	Léolia Jeanjean (FRA)						1							0	1
1	Maya Joint (AUS)						1							0	1
1	Katarzyna Kawa (POL)						1							0	1
1	Natália Kročková (SVK)						1							0	1
1	Ashlyn Krueger (USA)						1							0	1
1	Karolína Kubáňová (CZE)						1							0	1
1	Aneta Kučmová (CZE)						1							0	1
1	Ava Markham (USA)						1							0	1
1	Tereza Mihalíková (SVK)						1							0	1
1	Ingrid Neel (USA)						1							0	1
1	Noma Noha Akugue (GER)						1							0	1
1	Anna Rogers (USA)						1							0	1
1	Oksana Selekhmeteva						1							0	1
1	Magdaléna Smékalová (CZE)						1							0	1
1	Alice Tubello (FRA)						1							0	1
1	Tereza Valentová (CZE)						1							0	1
1	Sakura Hosogi (JPN)							1						1	0
1	Tatjana Maria (GER)							1						1	0
1	İpek Öz (TUR)							1						1	0
1	Valeria Savinykh							1						1	0
1	Zeynep Sönmez (TUR)							1						1	0
1	Maria Timofeeva							1						1	0
1	Kateryna Volodko (UKR)							1						1	0
1	Tara Würth (CRO)							1						1	0
1	Anna Danilina (KAZ)								1					0	1
1	Anastasia Kovaleva								1					0	1
1	Xenia Knoll (SUI)								1					0	1
1	Despina Papamichail (GRE)								1					0	1
1	Leyre Romero Gormaz (ESP)								1					0	1
1	Raluca Șerban (CYP)								1					0	1
1	Layne Sleeth (CAN)								1					0	1
1	Eva Vedder (NED)								1					0	1
1	Heather Watson (GBR)								1					0	1
1	Noelia Zeballos (BOL)								1					0	1
1	Silvia Ambrosio (ITA)									1				1	0
1	Mona Barthel (GER)									1				1	0
1	Maria Bondarenko									1				1	0
1	Lea Bošković (CRO)									1				1	0
1	Lizette Cabrera (AUS)									1				1	0
1	Sara Cakarevic (FRA)									1				1	0
1	Lucija Ćirić Bagarić (CRO)									1				1	0
1	Francesca Curmi (MLT)									1				1	0
1	Katy Dunne (GBR)									1				1	0
1	Jana Fett (CRO)									1				1	0
1	Eva Guerrero Álvarez (ESP)									1				1	0
1	Malene Helgø (NOR)									1				1	0
1	Polona Hercog (SLO)									1				1	0
1	Iva Jovic (USA)									1				1	0
1	Anastasia Kulikova (FIN)									1				1	0
1	Li Zongyu (CHN)									1				1	0
1	Ane Mintegi del Olmo (ESP)									1				1	0
1	Carole Monnet (FRA)									1				1	0
1	Asia Muhammad (USA)									1				1	0
1	Tamira Paszek (AUT)									1				1	0
1	Lesley Pattinama Kerkhove (NED)									1				1	0
1	Giorgia Pedone (ITA)									1				1	0
1	Lola Radivojević (SRB)									1				1	0
1	Sofia Rocchetti (ITA)									1				1	0
1	Sara Saito (JPN)									1				1	0
1	Ana Sofía Sánchez (MEX)									1				1	0
1	Mananchaya Sawangkaew (THA)									1				1	0
1	Lara Schmidt (GER)									1				1	0
1	Harmony Tan (FRA)									1				1	0
1	Alison Van Uytvanck (BEL)									1				q	0
1	Rosa Vicens Mas (ESP)									1				1	0
1	Sahaja Yamalapalli (IND)									1				1	0
1	Eleonora Alvisi (ITA)										1			0	1
1	Michaela Bayerlová (CZE)										1			0	1
1	Nefisa Berberović (BIH)										1			0	1
1	Paula Cembranos (SUI)										1			0	1
1	Deborah Chiesa (ITA)										1			0	1
1	Choi Ji-hee (KOR)										1			0	1
1	Lucía Cortez Llorca (ESP)										1			0	1
1	Kayla Cross (CAN)										1			0	1
1	Jaeda Daniel (USA)										1			0	1
1	Kristina Dmitruk										1			0	1
1	Mariana Dražić (CRO)										1			0	1
1	Živa Falkner (SLO)										1			0	1
1	Alexa Glatch (USA)										1			0	1
1	Han Jiangxue (CHN)										1			0	1
1	Dea Herdželaš (BIH)										1			0	1
1	Huang Yujia (CHN)										1			0	1
1	Anastasia Iamachkine (PER)										1			0	1
1	Jasmin Jebawy (GER)										1			0	1
1	Melany Krywoj (ARG)										1			0	1
1	Ku Yeon-woo (KOR)										1			0	1
1	Pia Lovrič (SLO)										1			0	1
1	Sophie Lüscher (SUI)										1			0	1
1	Elena Malõgina (EST)										1			0	1
1	Ella McDonald (GBR)										1			0	1
1	Victoria Mikhaylova										1			0	1
1	Kanako Morisaki (JPN)										1			0	1
1	Viktória Morvayová (SVK)										1			0	1
1	Adrienn Nagy (HUN)										1			0	1
1	Taylor Ng (USA)										1			0	1
1	Maileen Nuudi (EST)										1			0	1
1	Victoria Osuigwe (USA)										1			0	1
1	Lena Papadakis (GER)										1			0	1
1	Alana Parnaby (AUS)										1			0	1
1	Ellen Perez (AUS)										1			0	1
1	Ivana Popovic (AUS)										1			0	1
1	María Portillo Ramírez (MEX)										1			0	1
1	Hanna Poznikhirenko (UKR)										1			0	1
1	Kajsa Rinaldo Persson (SWE)										1			0	1
1	Hikaru Sato (JPN)										1			0	1
1	Ivana Šebestová (CZE)										1			0	1
1	Emily Seibold (GER)										1			0	1
1	Sofia Shapatava (GEO)										1			0	1
1	Madison Sieg (USA)										1			0	1
1	Natália Szabanin (HUN)										1			0	1
1	Alessandra Teodosescu (ITA)										1			0	1
1	Federica Urgesi (ITA)										1			0	1
1	Eliessa Vanlangendonck (BEL)										1			0	1
1	Wu Meixu (CHN)										1			0	1
1	Ikumi Yamazaki (JPN)										1			0	1
1	Maribella Zamarripa (USA)										1			0	1
1	Paula Arias Manjón (ESP)											1		1	0
1	Alisa Baranovska (UKR)											1		1	0
1	Panna Bartha (HUN)											1		1	0
1	Nahia Berecoechea (FRA)											1		1	0
1	Loïs Boisson (FRA)											1		1	0
1	Jana Bojović (SRB)											1		1	0
1	Noelia Bouzó Zanotti (ESP)											1		1	0
1	Jenna DeFalco (USA)											1		1	0
1	Ksenia Efremova (FRA)											1		1	0
1	Weronika Ewald (POL)											1		1	0
1	Fiona Ganz (SUI)											1		1	0
1	Luisina Giovannini (ARG)											1		1	0
1	Denislava Glushkova (BUL)											1		1	0
1	Hina Inoue (USA)											1		1	0
1	Yasmine Kabbaj (MAR)											1		1	0
1	Nicole Khirin (ISR)											1		1	0
1	Daria Khomutsianskaya											1		1	0
1	Tamara Kostic (AUT)											1		1	0
1	Lee Eun-hye (KOR)											1		1	0
1	Laura Mair (ITA)											1		1	0
1	Alexia Iulia Mărginean (ROU)											1		1	0
1	Sandy Marti (SUI)											1		1	0
1	Diana Martynov (FRA)											1		1	0
1	Megan McCray (USA)											1		1	0
1	Verena Meliss (ITA)											1		1	0
1	Mao Mushika (JPN)											1		1	0
1	Oleksandra Oliynykova (UKR)											1		1	0
1	Kira Pavlova											1		1	0
1	Maria Sara Popa (ROU)											1		1	0
1	Caroline Roméo (FRA)											1		1	0
1	Ruth Roura Llaverias (ESP)											1		1	0
1	Aruzhan Sagandikova (KAZ)											1		1	0
1	Julia Stamatova (BUL)											1		1	0
1	Briana Szabó (ROU)											1		1	0
1	Suana Tucaković (BIH)											1		1	0
1	Vicky Van de Peer (BEL)											1		1	0
1	Isis Louise van den Broek (NED)											1		1	0
1	Amelia Waligora (BEL)											1		1	0
1	Yao Xinxin (CHN)											1		1	0
1	Natsumi Yoshimoto (JPN)											1		1	0
1	Yuan Chengyiyi (CHN)											1		1	0
1	Camilla Zanolini (ITA)											1		1	0
1	Sylvie Zünd (LIE)											1		1	0
1	Magdalini Adaloglou (GRE)												1	0	1
1	Asylzhan Arystanbekova (KAZ)												1	0	1
1	Selina Atay (TUR)												1	0	1
1	Sharmada Balu (IND)												1	0	1
1	Irina Balus (SVK)												1	0	1
1	Weronika Baszak (POL)												1	0	1
1	Zuzanna Bednarz (POL)												1	0	1
1	Giuliana Bestetti (ITA)												1	0	1
1	Laura Böhner (GER)												1	0	1
1	Savannah Broadus (USA)												1	0	1
1	Isabella Chhiv (USA)												1	0	1
1	Enola Chiesa (ITA)												1	0	1
1	Yui Chikaraishi (JPN)												1	0	1
1	Giulia Crescenzi (ITA)												1	0	1
1	Samira De Stefano (ITA)												1	0	1
1	Joy de Zeeuw (NED)												1	0	1
1	Katie Dyson (GBR)												1	0	1
1	Malak El Allami (MAR)												1	0	1
1	Vanessa Ersöz (SWE)												1	0	1
1	Julieta Estable (ARG)												1	0	1
1	Yasmin Ezzat (EGY)												1	0	1
1	Jessica Failla (USA)												1	0	1
1	Aglaya Fedorova												1	0	1
1	Martina Genis Salas (ESP)												1	0	1
1	Elaine Genovese (MLT)												1	0	1
1	Marian Gómez Pezuela Cano (MEX)												1	0	1
1	Justina González Daniele (ARG)												1	0	1
1	Marta González Encinas (ESP)												1	0	1
1	Janika Kusy (GUA)												1	0	1
1	Kimmi Hance (USA)												1	0	1
1	Mei Hasegawa (JPN)												1	0	1
1	Laura Hietaranta (FIN)												1	0	1
1	Luisa Hrda (GER)												1	0	1
1	Denise Hrdinková (CZE)												1	0	1
1	Alevtina Ibragimova												1	0	1
1	Margarita Ignatjeva (LAT)												1	0	1
1	Akari Inoue (JPN)												1	0	1
1	Nanari Katsumi (JPN)												1	0	1
1	Nana Kawagishi (JPN)												1	0	1
1	Sandugash Kenzhibayeva (KAZ)												1	0	1
1	Kim Yu-jin (KOR)												1	0	1
1	Anouk Koevermans (NED)												1	0	1
1	Anet Angelika Koskel (EST)												1	0	1
1	Stella Kovačičová (SVK)												1	0	1
1	Ștefana Lazăr (ROU)												1	0	1
1	Andjela Lazarević (SRB)												1	0	1
1	Sabastiani León (USA)												1	0	1
1	Polina Leykina												1	0	1
1	Astrid Lew Yan Foon (FRA)												1	0	1
1	Lin Fang-an (TPE)												1	0	1
1	Liu Yanni (CHN)												1	0	1
1	Lucía Llinares Domingo (ESP)												1	0	1
1	Daria Lopatetska (UKR)												1	0	1
1	Lola Marandel (FRA)												1	0	1
1	Bojana Marinković (SRB)												1	0	1
1	Lisa Mays (AUS)												1	0	1
1	Kaylah McPhee (AUS)												1	0	1
1	Alicia Melosch (GER)												1	0	1
1	Mi Tianmi (CHN)												1	0	1
1	Elena Micic (AUS)												1	0	1
1	Maria Mikhailova												1	0	1
1	Nell Miller (GBR)												1	0	1
1	Miyu Nakashima (JPN)												1	0	1
1	Rhiann Newborn (USA)												1	0	1
1	Rose Marie Nijkamp (NED)												1	0	1
1	Tea Nikčević (MNE)												1	0	1
1	Kristina Novak (SLO)												1	0	1
1	Beverley Nyangon (FRA)												1	0	1
1	Salakthip Ounmuang (THA)												1	0	1
1	Francesca Pace (ITA)												1	0	1
1	Olga Parres Azcoitia (ESP)												1	0	1
1	Rebeca Pereira (BRA)												1	0	1
1	Ada Piestrzyńska (POL)												1	0	1
1	Vanessa Popa Teiușanu (ROU)												1	0	1
1	Maja Radenkovic (SWE)												1	0	1
1	Lidiia Rasskovskaia												1	0	1
1	Merna Refaat (EGY)												1	0	1
1	Lisa-Marie Rioux (JPN)												1	0	1
1	Nicole Rivkin (GER)												1	0	1
1	Ioana Loredana Roșca (ROU)												1	0	1
1	Malwina Rowińska (POL)												1	0	1
1	Nina Rudiukova												1	0	1
1	Arlinda Rushiti (SUI)												1	0	1
1	Zdena Šafářová (CZE)												1	0	1
1	Julita Saner (SWE)												1	0	1
1	Himari Sato (JPN)												1	0	1
1	Shi Han (CHN)												1	0	1
1	Shin Ji-ho (KOR)												1	0	1
1	Johanna Silva (GER)												1	0	1
1	Mariya Sinitsyna (KAZ)												1	0	1
1	Amélie Šmejkalová (CZE)												1	0	1
1	Alicia Smith (AUS)												1	0	1
1	Arina Solomatina (KGZ)												1	0	1
1	Gaia Squarcialupi (ITA)												1	0	1
1	Mary Stoiana (USA)												1	0	1
1	Darja Suvirđonkova (SRB)												1	0	1
1	Laura Svatiková (SVK)												1	0	1
1	Marine Szostak (FRA)												1	0	1
1	Lucie Urbanová (CZE)												1	0	1
1	Sarah van Emst (NED)												1	0	1
1	Nina Vargová (SVK)												1	0	1
1	Marie Villet (FRA)												1	0	1
1	Clara Vlasselaer (BEL)												1	0	1
1	Khrystyna Vozniak (UKR)												1	0	1
1	Yasmine Wagner (GER)												1	0	1
1	Xun Fangying (CHN)												1	0	1
1	Sevil Yuldasheva (UZB)												1	0	1
1	Daria Zelinskaya												1	0	1
1	Amy Zhu (USA)												1	0	1

=== Titles won by nation ===
Updated as of 31 December

Total	Nation	W100		W80		W60		W40		W25		W15		Total	
Total	Nation	S	D	S	D	S	D	S	D	S	D	S	D	S	D
116	United States (USA)	4	5	2	1	9	19	1	6	14	31	8	16	38	78
70	Australia (AUS)		2			9	7	1	4	18	21	1	7	29	41
67	Japan (JPN)		4	1		1	5	3	3	4	15	15	15	24	43
63	China (CHN)	4	1			1	2	3	6	9	11	11	15	28	35
59	Romania (ROU)		1			4	3		4	6	9	11	21	21	38
58	France (FRA)		2	1	3	7	3	2	1	10	5	15	9	35	23
57	Czech Republic (CZE)		1			2	8	6	3	16	12	2	7	26	31
56	Germany (GER)					2	4	1	2	6	10	9	22	18	38
46	Italy (ITA)		1			1	2	1	1	6	13	6	15	14	32
44	Ukraine (UKR)	1	1			5	2	2	4	3	12	5	9	16	28
43	Great Britain (GBR)		2		1	2	8		5	4	15		6	6	37
38	Switzerland (SUI)	2		2			3	1	2	2	6	6	14	13	25
37	Belgium (BEL)	2	1			2	3	3	3	6	5	5	7	19	18
37	Netherlands (NED)		2		2		2	2	3	3	6	4	13	9	28
28	Argentina (ARG)				1	1		1		11	5	5	4	18	10
27	Serbia (SRB)	1	1			1		1		3	3	9	8	15	12
25	Greece (GRE)		1				2	1	1	4	5	4	7	9	16
25	Spain (ESP)					2			1	6	5	6	5	14	11
25	Chinese Taipei (TPE)							1	4	5	4		11	6	19
24	Slovenia (SLO)					1	2		4	5	10		2	6	18
24	Slovakia (SVK)						1	1	1	1	2	5	13	7	17
23	Thailand (THA)		1					3		1	4	7	7	11	12
22	Poland (POL)	1					4			1	6	3	7	5	17
21	Hungary (HUN)		2			1	1			4	5	5	3	10	11
19	India (IND)					1	1		2	3	4	3	5	7	12
18	South Korea (KOR)				1	1				3	4	5	4	9	9
18	Canada (CAN)					4		1	1	4	2	2	4	11	7
18	Latvia (LAT)					3	1	1	3	1	5	1	3	6	12
15	Sweden (SWE)	1									6	2	6	3	12
14	Brazil (BRA)				1	1	1			1	1	1	8	3	11
13	Kazakhstan (KAZ)						2		2		3	3	3	3	10
13	Lithuania (LTU)						1		1		2	2	7	2	11
13	Turkey (TUR)							3	1			4	5	7	6
12	Croatia (CRO)					3		2		6	1			11	1
12	Egypt (EGY)											6	6	6	6
10	Mexico (MEX)		1			1	1			2	4		1	3	7
10	Portugal (POR)						2		1	1	4		2	1	9
9	Bulgaria (BUL)	1		1				2	1			3	1	7	2
9	Hong Kong (HKG)		1						2	1	3	1	1	2	7
9	Georgia (GEO)								3	2	4			2	7
6	Peru (PER)						1				4		1	0	6
5	Austria (AUT)	1						1		2		1		5	0
5	Bosnia and Herzegovina (BIH)										4	1		1	4
4	Estonia (EST)					1					2		1	1	3
4	Colombia (COL)						1				3			1	3
4	Kenya (KEN)									1	1	1	1	2	2
4	Morocco (MAR)											2	2	2	2
3	Norway (NOR)		1							1	1			1	2
3	Denmark (DEN)					1						1	1	2	1
3	North Macedonia (MKD)						1	1	1					1	2
3	Israel (ISR)						1				1	1		1	2
3	Cyprus (CYP)								1			2		2	1
3	Ecuador (ECU)											1	2	1	2
2	Montenegro (MNE)	1											1	1	1
2	Uzbekistan (UZB)					1							1	1	1
2	Luxembourg (LUX)						1				1			0	2
2	Venezuela (VEN)								2					0	2
2	Burundi (BDI)								1		1			0	2
2	Andorra (AND)									2				2	0
2	Philippines (PHI)									2				2	0
2	Finland (FIN)									1			1	1	1
2	Malta (MLT)									1			1	1	1
2	Chile (CHI)										1		1	0	2
1	Bolivia (BOL)								1					0	1
1	Liechtenstein (LIE)											1		1	0
1	Guatemala (GUA)												1	0	1
1	Kyrgyzstan (KGZ)												1	0	1

== See also ==
- 2023 WTA Tour
- 2023 WTA 125 tournaments
- 2023 ATP Challenger Tour
- 2023 ITF Men's World Tennis Tour
