= 2023 Liepāja Open – Singles =

Singles
- 2023 Liepāja Open

Final
- Champion: (Latvia) Darja Semeņistaja
- Runner-up: (United States) Jessie Aney
- Score: 6–4, 6–4

Events
Singles	Doubles
← 2022 ·	Liepāja Open	· 2024 →

Emma Navarro was the defending champion but chose not to participate.

Darja Semeņistaja won the title, defeating Jessie Aney in the final, 6–4, 6–4.

== Seeds ==
All seeds receive a bye into the second round.

1. (Spain) Aliona Bolsova (third round)
2. (South Korea) Jang Su-jeong (third round)
3. (Hungary) Réka Luca Jani (second round)
4. (Greece) Valentini Grammatikopoulou (second round)
5. (Croatia) Petra Marčinko (quarterfinals)
6. (Germany) Mona Barthel (second round)
7. (Czech Republic) Lucie Havlíčková (third round)
8. (Latvia) Darja Semeņistaja (champion)
9. (Turkey) İpek Öz (quarterfinals)
10. (Spain) Irene Burillo Escorihuela (third round)
11. (North Macedonia) Lina Gjorcheska (second round)
12. (Turkey) Çağla Büyükakçay (third round)
13. (Croatia) Jana Fett (second round)
14. (Romania) Cristina Dinu (semifinals)
15. (Ukraine) Valeriya Strakhova (second round)
16. (Estonia) Elena Malõgina (third round)

== Draw ==
=== Key ===
- Q = Qualifier
- WC = Wild card
- LL = Lucky loser
- Alt = Alternate
- SE = Special exempt
- PR = Protected ranking
- ITF = ITF entry
- JE = Junior exempt
- w/o = Walkover
- r = Retired
- d = Defaulted
- SR = Special ranking

=== Finals ===
Quarterfinals
(Italy) Dalila Spiteri	6	5	6
9	(Turkey) İpek Öz	2	7	4
(United States) Jessie Aney	6	6
5	(Croatia) Petra Marčinko	1	2
8	(Latvia) Darja Semeņistaja	7	6
(Serbia) Dejana Radanović	5	4
(Malta) Francesca Curmi	3	6	4
14	(Romania) Cristina Dinu	6	4	6

Semifinals
(Italy) Dalila Spiteri	6	3	4
(United States) Jessie Aney	4	6	6
8	(Latvia) Darja Semeņistaja	6	6
14	(Romania) Cristina Dinu	2	3

Final
(United States) Jessie Aney	4	4
8	(Latvia) Darja Semeņistaja	6	6

=== Top half ===
==== Section 1 ====
First round
WC	(Latvia) A Ozerova	5	4
WC	(Latvia) B Zeltiņa	7	6
(Germany) K Kanev	7	2	2
(Italy) D Spiteri	5	6	6
(Estonia) M Nuudi	6	6
Q	(Ukraine) K Lazarenko	2	0
Q	(Lithuania) K Bubelytė	6	6
WC	(Latvia) P Špaka	1	3

Second round
1	(Spain) A Bolsova	6	2	7
WC	(Latvia) B Zeltiņa	3	6	5
(Italy) D Spiteri	6	3	6
15	(Ukraine) V Strakhova	4	6	2
9	(Turkey) İ Öz	6	6
(Estonia) M Nuudi	1	0
Q	(Lithuania) K Bubelytė	7^{7}	6
6	(Germany) M Barthel	6^{2}	0

Third round
1	(Spain) A Bolsova	4	1
(Italy) D Spiteri	6	6
9	(Turkey) İ Öz	3	6	7
Q	(Lithuania) K Bubelytė	6	3	5

Quarterfinals
(Italy) D Spiteri	6	5	6
9	(Turkey) İ Öz	2	7	4

==== Section 2 ====
First round
(Slovakia) E Méri	6	6
Q	(Germany) E Welker	1	0
(United States) J Aney	6^{8}	6	6
(Hungary) F Stollár	7^{10}	1	1
(Italy) F Di Sarra	6	4	6
Q	(Switzerland) S Scilipoti	3	6	3
(Denmark) J Svendsen	7^{7}	2	0
(Bulgaria) L Karatancheva	6^{1}	6	6

Second round
3	(Hungary) RL Jani	6	2	5
(Slovakia) E Méri	1	6	7
(United States) J Aney	6	6
13	(Croatia) J Fett	2	4
10	(Spain) I Burillo Escorihuela	6	4	1
(Italy) F Di Sarra	1	6	0^{r}
(Bulgaria) L Karatancheva	5	1
5	(Croatia) P Marčinko	7	6

Third round
(Slovakia) E Méri	1	1
(United States) J Aney	6	6
10	(Spain) I Burillo Escorihuela	3	4
5	(Croatia) P Marčinko	6	6

Quarterfinals
(United States) J Aney	6	6
5	(Croatia) P Marčinko	1	2

=== Bottom half ===
==== Section 3 ====
First round
Q	(Germany) S Herrmann	5	2
(Latvia) D Vismane	7	6
Q	(Slovenia) N Radišić	7	3	6
(Czech Republic) I Šebestová	5	6	1
Q	(Romania) S Dadaciu	5	1
(Italy) M Tona	7	6
(Ukraine) O Oliynykova	7	3	6^{4}
(Serbia) D Radanović	5	6	7^{7}

Second round
8	(Latvia) D Semeņistaja	3	6	6
(Latvia) D Vismane	6	0	3
Q	(Slovenia) N Radišić	1	2
12	(Turkey) Ç Büyükakçay	6	6
16	(Estonia) E Malõgina	7^{7}	6
(Italy) M Tona	6^{2}	3
(Serbia) D Radanović	7^{7}	6
4	(Greece) V Grammatikopoulou	6^{2}	2

Third round
8	(Latvia) D Semeņistaja	6	4	6
12	(Turkey) Ç Büyükakçay	0	6	4
16	(Estonia) E Malõgina	4	6	0
(Serbia) D Radanović	6	2	6

Quarterfinals
8	(Latvia) D Semeņistaja	7	6
(Serbia) D Radanović	5	4

==== Section 4 ====
First round
(Slovakia) R Zelníčková	6	6
(Italy) G Pedone	4	4
(Netherlands) S Visscher	6^{3}	4
(Malta) F Curmi	7^{7}	6
WC	(Latvia) A Lachinova	6	4	0
(Australia) O Tjandramulia	3	6	6
WC	(Latvia) RM Mertena	6^{2}	6	3
Q	(Germany) N Siedliska	7^{7}	1	6

Second round
7	(Czech Republic) L Havlíčková	6	6
(Slovakia) R Zelníčková	3	4
(Malta) F Curmi	1	6	7
11	(North Macedonia) L Gjorcheska	6	4	5
14	(Romania) C Dinu	6	6
(Australia) O Tjandramulia	3	1
Q	(Germany) N Siedliska	1	2
2	(South Korea) S-j Jang	6	6

Third round
7	(Czech Republic) L Havlíčková	6	3	2
(Malta) F Curmi	1	6	6
14	(Romania) C Dinu	7	6
2	(South Korea) S-j Jang	5	2

Quarterfinals
(Malta) F Curmi	3	6	4
14	(Romania) C Dinu	6	4	6
