= Emma Navarro career statistics =

Career finals
Discipline	Type	Won	Lost	Total
Singles	Grand Slam	–	–	–
Singles	WTA Finals	–	–	–
Singles	WTA 1000	–	–	–
Singles	WTA 500	–	–	–
Singles	WTA 250	–	–	–
Singles	Olympics	–	–	–
Singles	Total	0	0	0
Doubles	Grand Slam	–	–	–
Doubles	WTA Finals	–	–	–
Doubles	WTA 1000	–	–	–
Doubles	WTA 500	–	–	–
Doubles	WTA 250	–	–	–
Doubles	Olympics	–	–	–
Doubles	Total	0	0	0

This is a list of career statistics of American tennis player Emma Navarro.

== Performance timeline ==
Key
W	F	SF	QF	#R	RR	Q#	P#	DNQ	A	Z#	PO	G	S	B	NMS	NTI	P	NH

(W) winner; (F) finalist; (SF) semifinalist; (QF) quarterfinalist; (#R) rounds 4, 3, 2, 1; (RR) round-robin stage; (Q#) qualification round; (P#) preliminary round; (DNQ) did not qualify; (A) absent; (Z#) Davis/Fed Cup Zonal Group (with number indication) or (PO) play-off; (G) gold, (S) silver or (B) bronze Olympic/Paralympic medal; (NMS) not a Masters tournament; (NTI) not a Tier I tournament; (P) postponed; (NH) not held; (SR) strike rate (events won / competed); (W–L) win–loss record.
To avoid confusion and double counting, these charts are updated at the conclusion of a tournament or when the player's participation has ended.

Only main-draw results in WTA Tour, Grand Slam tournaments, Billie Jean King Cup, United Cup, Hopman Cup and Olympic Games are included in win–loss records.

=== Singles ===
Tournament	2019	2020	2021	2022	2023	2024	2025	2026	SR	W–L	Win%
Grand Slam tournaments
Australian Open	A	A	A	A	A	3R	QF	1R	0 / 3	6–3	67%
French Open	A	A	A	A	2R	4R	1R	2R	0 / 4	5–4	56%
Wimbledon	A	NH	A	A	1R	QF	4R	3R	0 / 4	9–4	69%
US Open	Q1	A	1R	A	1R	SF	3R	QF	0 / 5	11–5	69%
Win–Loss	0–0	0–0	0–1	0–0	1–3	14–4	9–4	7–4	0 / 16	31–16	63%
Year-end championships
WTA Finals	DNQ	NH	DNQ			Alt/A	DNQ		0 / 0	0–0	–
National representation
Summer Olympics	NH		A	NH		3R	NH		0 / 1	2–1	67%
Billie Jean King Cup	A	A	A	A	A	QR	F	A	0 / 2	3–1	75%
WTA 1000 tournaments
Qatar Open	NTI	A	NTI	A	NTI	3R	2R	2R	0 / 3	3–3	50%
Dubai Championships	A	NTI	A	NTI	A	2R	3R	2R	0 / 3	3–3	50%
Indian Wells Open	A	NH	A	1R	2R	QF	3R	2R	0 / 5	5–5	50%
Miami Open	A	NH	A	A	Q2	3R	2R	A	0 / 2	2–2	50%
Madrid Open	A	NH	A	A	A	3R	3R	A	0 / 2	2–2	50%
Italian Open	A	A	A	A	A	2R	3R	2R	0 / 3	1–3	25%
Canadian Open	A	NH	A	A	A	SF	3R	3R	0 / 3	5–3	63%
Cincinnati Open	A	A	Q1	A	1R	1R	2R	3R	0 / 4	1–4	20%
China Open	A	NH			A	2R	QF	A	0 / 2	3–2	60%
Wuhan Open	A	NH				2R	1R	A	0 / 2	0–2	0%
Guadalajara Open	NH			A	3R	NTI			0 / 1	2–1	67%
Win–Loss	0–0	0–0	0–0	0–1	3–3	13–10	8–10	3–6	0 / 30	27–30	46%
Career statistics
	2019	2020	2021	2022	2023	2024	2025	2026	SR	W–L	Win%
Tournaments	1	1	3	3	14	23	25	19	Career total: 89		
Titles	0	0	0	0	0	1	1	1	Career total: 3		
Finals	0	0	0	0	0	1	1	2	Career total: 4		
Overall win–loss	0–1	0–1	2–3	1–3	16–14	46–22	32–25	24–18	3 / 89	121–87	58%
Year-end ranking (Note: 2018: WTA ranking–763.)	486	463	233	143	38	8	15		$7,459,094		

== WTA Tour finals ==
=== Singles: 4 (3 titles, 1 runner-up) ===
Legend WTA 500 (2–0) WTA 250 (1–1)	Finals by surface Hard (2–0) Clay (1–0) Grass (0–1)	Finals by setting Outdoor (3–1)

Result	W–L	Date	Tournament	Tier	Surface	Opponent	Score
Win	1–0	Jan 2024	Hobart International, Australia	WTA 250	Hard	(Belgium) Elise Mertens	6–1, 4–6, 7–5
Win	2–0	Mar 2025	Mérida Open, Mexico	WTA 500	Hard	(Colombia) Emiliana Arango	6–0, 6–0
Win	3–0	May 2026	Internationaux de Strasbourg, France	WTA 500	Clay	(Canada) Victoria Mboko	6–0, 5–7, 6–2
Loss	3–1	Jun 2026	Nottingham Open, UK	WTA 250	Grass	(Czech Republic) Marie Bouzková	6–7^{(5–7)}, 6–4, 2–6

== WTA 125 finals ==
=== Singles: 2 (2 runner-ups) ===
Result	W–L	Date	Tournament	Surface	Opponent	Score
Loss	0–1	Jul 2023	Båstad Open, Sweden	Clay	(Serbia) Olga Danilović	6–7^{(4–7)}, 6–3, 3–6
Loss	0–2	May 2024	Clarins Open, France	Clay	Diana Shnaider	2–6, 6–3, 4–6

== ITF Circuit finals ==
=== Singles: 11 (7 titles, 4 runner-ups) ===
Legend W100 tournaments (2–1) W80 tournaments (1–0) W60 tournaments (2–3) W25 tournaments (2–0)	Finals by surface Hard (2–0) Clay (5–3) Grass (0–1)

Result	W–L	Date	Tournament	Tier	Surface	Opponent	Score
Win	1–0	Nov 2021	ITF Orlando, United States	W25	Clay	(United States) Allie Kiick	3–6, 6–2, 6–3
Loss	1–1	Jul 2022	Amstelveen Open, Netherlands	W60	Clay	(Switzerland) Simona Waltert	6–7^{(10–12)}, 0–6
Win	2–1	Jul 2022	Liepāja Open, Latvia	W60	Clay	(China) Yuan Yue	6–4, 6–4
Loss	2–2	Sep 2022	Montreux Ladies Open, Switzerland	W60	Clay	(Germany) Tamara Korpatsch	4–6, 1–6
Win	3–2	Jan 2023	ITF Naples, United States	W25	Hard	(United States) Peyton Stearns	6–3, 7–5
Loss	3–3	Jan 2023	Vero Beach Open, United States	W60	Clay	(Belgium) Marie Benoît	2–6, 5–7
Win	4–3	Apr 2023	Charleston Pro, United States	W100	Clay	(United States) Peyton Stearns	2–6, 6–2, 7–5
Win	5–3	Apr 2023	Charlottesville Open, United States	W60	Clay	(United States) Ashlyn Krueger	6–4, 6–4
Loss	5–4	Jun 2023	Ilkley Trophy, United Kingdom	W100	Grass	(Sweden) Mirjam Björklund	4–6, 5–7
Win	6–4	Oct 2023	Tyler Pro Challenge, United States	W80	Hard	(United States) Kayla Day	6–3, 6–4
Win	7–4	Nov 2023	Charleston Pro, United States (2)	W100	Clay	(Hungary) Panna Udvardy	6–1, 6–1

=== Doubles: 1 (title) ===
Legend
15k tournaments

Result	Date	Tournament	Tier	Surface	Partner	Opponents	Score
Win	Oct 2017	ITF Charleston, United States	15k	Clay	(United States) Chloe Beck	(Russia) Ksenia Kuznetsova (Spain) Maria Martínez	6–1, 6–4

== Junior Grand Slam tournament finals ==
=== Singles: 1 (runner-up) ===
Result	Year	Tournament	Surface	Opponent	Score
Loss	2019	French Open	Clay	(Canada) Leylah Fernandez	3–6, 2–6

=== Doubles: 2 (1 title, 1 runner-up) ===
Result	Year	Tournament	Surface	Partner	Opponents	Score
Loss	2019	Australian Open	Hard	(United States) Chloe Beck	(Hungary) Adrienn Nagy (Japan) Natsumi Kawaguchi	4–6, 4–6
Win	2019	French Open	Clay	(United States) Chloe Beck	(Russia) Alina Charaeva (Russia) Anastasia Tikhonova	6–1, 6–2

== Wins against top 10 players ==
- Navarro has a 9–15 record against players who were ranked in the top 10 at the time the match was played.

Season	2023	2024	2025	2026	Total
Wins	1	3	2	3	9

No.	Player	Rk	Event	Surface	Rd	Score	Rk	Years	Ref
1.	(Greece) Maria Sakkari	9	San Diego, United States	Hard	QF	6–4, 0–6, 7–6^{(4)}	61	2023	
2.	Aryna Sabalenka	2	Indian Wells, United States	Hard	4R	6–3, 3–6, 6–2	23	2024	
3.	(United States) Coco Gauff	2	Wimbledon, UK	Grass	4R	6–4, 6–3	17	2024	
4.	(United States) Coco Gauff	3	US Open, United States	Hard	4R	6–3, 4–6, 6–3	12	2024	
5.	Daria Kasatkina	10	Australian Open, Australia	Hard	4R	6–4, 5–7, 7–5	8	2025	
6.	(Poland) Iga Świątek	2	China Open, China	Hard	4R	6–4, 4–6, 6–0	17	2025	
7.	(Canada) Victoria Mboko	9	Internationaux de Strasbourg, France	Clay	F	6–0, 5–7, 6–2	39	2026	
8.	(Poland) Iga Świątek	3	Bad Homburg Open, Germany	Grass	2R	7–5, 2–6, 6–3	25	2026	
9.	(Czech Republic) Karolína Muchová	7	US Open, United States	Hard	3R	6–3, 7–5	27	2026	

- Key: (Rk) first use, opponent rank; (Rd) round; (Rk) 2nd use, player rank; (Ref) reference; (F) final; (SF) semifinal; (QF) quarterfinal; (#R) rounds 4, 3, 2, 1; (RR) round-robin stage; (Q#) qualifying rounds or stages (3), 2, 1.

== Awards ==
2024

- WTA Most Improved Player
