= 2022 Billie Jean King Cup Europe/Africa Zone Group II – play-offs =

Subsection of tennis competition

The play-offs of the 2022 Billie Jean King Cup Europe/Africa Zone Group II were the final stages of the Group II zonal competition involving teams from Europe and Africa. Using the positions determined in their pools, the seven teams faced off to determine their placing in the 2022 Billie Jean King Cup Europe/Africa Zone Group II. The top two teams advanced to Group I, and the bottom two teams were relegated down to the Group III for 2023.

== Pool results ==
Placing	Pool A	Pool B
1	Norway	Lithuania
2	Egypt	Israel
3	Greece	Luxembourg
4	—N/a	Finland

== Promotional play-offs ==
The first-placed teams of each pool played against the second-placed teams of the other pool in head-to-head rounds. The winner of each round advanced to the 2023 Europe/Africa Zone Group I.

=== Norway vs. Israel ===
Norway
2
Vierumäki, Finland
15 April 2022
Hard (i)

Israel
1

			1	2	3
1	(Norway) (Israel)	Malene Helgø; Nicole Khirin	6^{1} 7^{7}	6; 4	6; 2
2	(Norway) (Israel)	Ulrikke Eikeri; Lina Glushko	1; 6	4; 6
3	(Norway) (Israel)	Ulrikke Eikeri / Malene Helgø; Lina Glushko / Shavit Kimchi	6; 2	7; 5

=== Lithuania vs. Egypt ===
Lithuania
1
Vierumäki, Finland
15 April 2022
Hard (i)

Egypt
2

			1	2	3
1	(Lithuania) (Egypt)	Andrė Lukošiūtė; Sandra Samir	6; 2	6; 1
2	(Lithuania) (Egypt)	Justina Mikulskytė; Mayar Sherif	2; 6	2; 6
3	(Lithuania) (Egypt)	Justina Mikulskytė / Patricija Paukstytė; Rana Sherif Ahmed / Mayar Sherif	6^{7} 7^{9}	4; 6

== Relegation play-offs ==
The third-placed teams of the pools played against each other in a head-to-head round. The loser was relegated to 2023 Europe/Africa Zone Group III, alongside Finland who finished fourth in Pool B.

=== Greece vs. Luxembourg ===
Greece
2
Vierumäki, Finland
15 April 2022
Hard (i)

Luxembourg
1

			1	2	3
1	(Greece) (Luxembourg)	Martha Matoula; Marie Weckerle	3; 6	7^{7} 6^{4}	6; 0
2	(Greece) (Luxembourg)	Despina Papamichail; Mandy Minella	1; 6	0; 6
3	(Greece) (Luxembourg)	Eleni Christofi / Despina Papamichail; Mandy Minella / Claudine Schaul	6; 3	7; 5

== Final placements ==
Placing	Teams	
Promoted/First	Norway	Egypt
Third	Israel	Lithuania
Fifth	Greece	
Relegated/Sixth	Luxembourg	
Relegated/Seventh	Finland	

- Norway and Egypt were promoted to Europe/Africa Zone Group I in 2023.
- Finland and Luxembourg were relegated to Europe/Africa Zone Group III in 2023.
