= 2022 Billie Jean King Cup Europe/Africa Zone Group II – Pool A =

Subsection of tennis competition

Pool A of the 2022 Billie Jean King Cup Europe/Africa Zone Group II was one of two pools in the Europe/Africa zone of the 2020–21 Billie Jean King Cup. Three teams competed in a round robin competition, with the top teams and the bottom team proceeding to their respective sections of the play-offs: the top teams played for advancement to Group I in 2023.

== Standings ==
		NOR	EGY	GRE	RR; W–L	Set; W–L	Game; W–L	Standings
5	Norway		2–1	1–2	3–3	9–7 (56%)	86–68 (56%)	1
4	Egypt	1–2		2–1	3–3	7–7 (50%)	62–69 (47%)	2
1	Greece	2–1	1–2		3–3	6–8 (43%)	61–72 (46%)	3

Standings are determined by: 1. number of wins; 2. number of matches; 3. in two-team ties, head-to-head records; 4. in three-team ties, (a) percentage of matches won (head-to-head records if two teams remain tied), then (b) percentage of sets won (head-to-head records if two teams remain tied), then (c) percentage of games won (head-to-head records if two teams remain tied), then (d) Billie Jean King Cup rankings.

== Round-robin ==
=== Egypt vs. Norway ===
Egypt
1
Vierumäki, Finland
12 April 2022
Hard (i)

Norway
2

			1	2	3
1	(Egypt) (Norway)	Sandra Samir; Malene Helgø	6^{7} 7^{9}	0; 6
2	(Egypt) (Norway)	Mayar Sherif; Ulrikke Eikeri	3; 6	7^{7} 6^{5}	6; 4
3	(Egypt) (Norway)	Rana Sherif Ahmed / Mayar Sherif; Ulrikke Eikeri / Malene Helgø	1; 6	6; 4	2; 6

=== Greece vs. Norway ===
Greece
2
Vierumäki, Finland
13 April 2022
Hard (i)

Norway
1

			1	2	3
1	(Greece) (Norway)	Michaela Laki; Malene Helgø	4; 6	1; 6
2	(Greece) (Norway)	Despina Papamichail; Ulrikke Eikeri	2; 6	7; 5	6; 4
3	(Greece) (Norway)	Eleni Christofi / Despina Papamichail; Ulrikke Eikeri / Malene Helgø	5; 7	6; 4	6; 3

=== Greece vs. Egypt ===
Greece
1
Vierumäki, Finland
14 April 2022
Hard (i)

Egypt
2

			1	2	3
1	(Greece) (Egypt)	Michaela Laki; Sandra Samir	6; 3	6; 4
2	(Greece) (Egypt)	Despina Papamichail; Mayar Sherif	3; 6	3; 6
3	(Greece) (Egypt)	Eleni Christofi / Despina Papamichail; Rana Sherif Ahmed / Mayar Sherif	4; 6	2; 6
