= Liepāja Open =

- 2022 Liepāja Open

ITF Women's Tour
- Event name: Liepāja Open
- Location: Liepāja, Latvia
- Venue: Liepājas Tenisa sporta skola
- Category: ITF Women's World Tennis Tour
- Surface: Clay / outdoor
- Draw: 32S/32Q/16D
- Prize money: $60,000

The Liepāja Open is a tournament for professional female tennis players played on outdoor clay courts. The event is classified as a $60,000 ITF Women's World Tennis Tour tournament and has been held in Liepāja, Latvia, since 2020.

== Past finals ==
=== Singles ===
Year	Champion	Runner-up	Score
2023	(Latvia) Darja Semeņistaja	(United States) Jessie Aney	6–4, 6–4
2022	(United States) Emma Navarro	(China) Yuan Yue	6–4, 6–4
2021	(Latvia) Daniela Vismane	(Norway) Malene Helgø	6–4, 6–4
2020	(Latvia) Elza Tomase	(Netherlands) Quirine Lemoine	0–6, 6–3, 6–1

=== Doubles ===
Year	Champions	Runners-up	Score
2023	(Latvia) Darja Semeņistaja (Latvia) Daniela Vismane	(Turkey) Çağla Büyükakçay (North Macedonia) Lina Gjorcheska	6–4, 2–6, [10–3]
2022	(Slovenia) Dalila Jakupović (Serbia) Ivana Jorović	(United Kingdom) Emily Appleton (India) Prarthana Thombare	6–4, 6–3
2021	(Uzbekistan) Akgul Amanmuradova (Russia) Valentina Ivakhnenko	(Greece) Valentini Grammatikopoulou (Belarus) Shalimar Talbi	6–3, 3–6, [13–11]
2020	(Belarus) Katyarina Paulenka (Russia) Ekaterina Shalimova	(Poland) Weronika Falkowska (Poland) Martyna Kubka	4–6, 6–3, [12–10]
