= Patricija Paukštytė =

Lithuanian tennis player (born 2004)

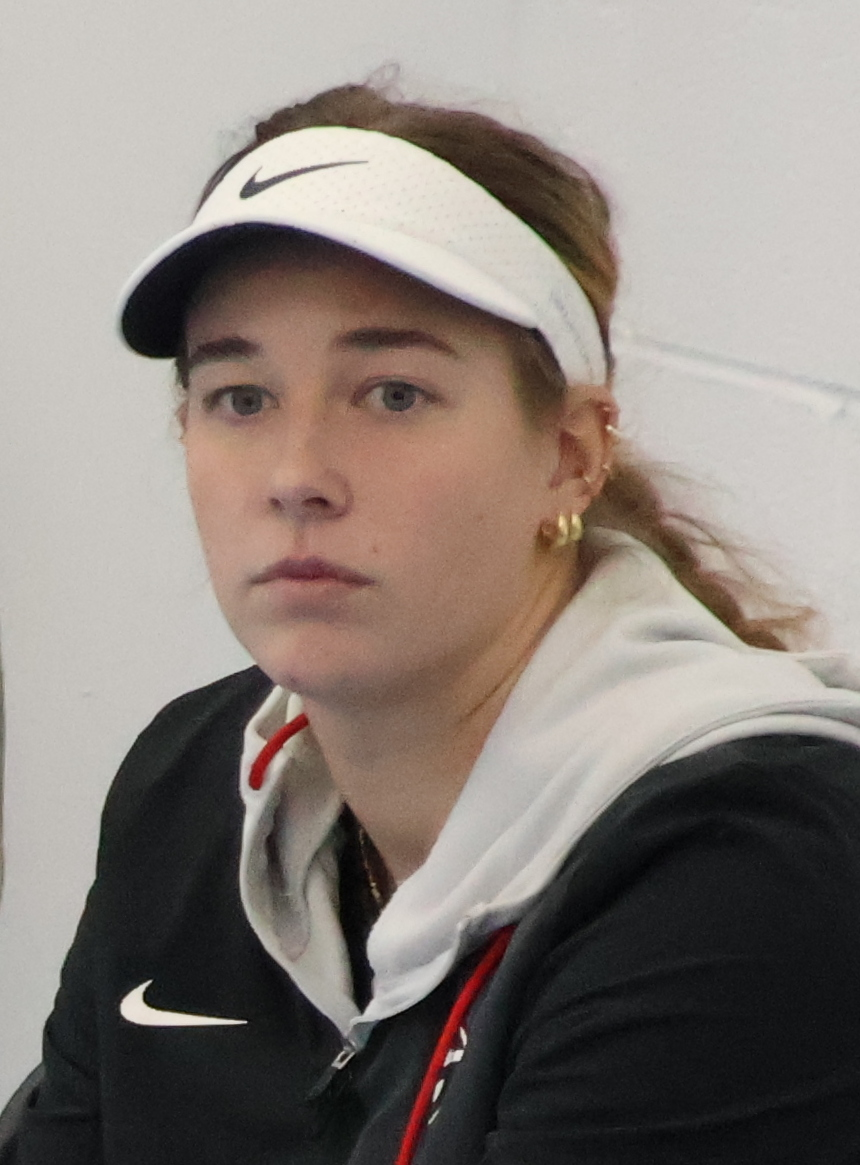
- Paukštytė with Georgia Bulldogs in 2026
- Country (sports): Lithuania
- Born: 13 September 2004 (age 21) Kaunas, Lithuania
- Plays: Right-handed
- College: Georgia
- Prize money: $35,382

Singles
- Career record: 87–59
- Career titles: 2 ITF
- Highest ranking: No. 622 (7 April 2025)

Doubles
- Career record: 109–45
- Career titles: 10 ITF
- Highest ranking: No. 466 (22 September 2025)
- Current ranking: No. 944 (29 June 2026)

Team competitions
- Fed Cup: 13–5
- Last updated on: 7 July 2026.

Patricija Paukštytė (born 13 September 2004) is an inactive Lithuanian tennis player.

Paukštytė has a career-high singles ranking by the WTA of 622, achieved on 7 April 2025. She also has a career-high WTA doubles ranking of 484, reached on the same date.

Playing for Lithuania in the Billie Jean King Cup (BJK Cup), Paukštytė has a win–loss record of 13–5.

In March 2023, Paukštytė won her first match as a professional ın Heraklion, Greece. In October, she won the championship in doubles in Villena, Spain.

In 2024, Paukštytė took part in Group I as a result of successful matches in the BJK Cup played in Vilnius, Lithuania.

== ITF Circuit finals ==
=== Singles: 4 (2 titles, 2 runner-ups) ===
Legend W15 tournaments (2–2)	Finals by surface Hard (2–2)

Result	W–L	Date	Tournament	Tier	Surface	Opponent	Score
Win	1–0	Apr 2024	ITF Monastir, Tunisia	W15	Hard	Mariia Tkacheva	7–6^{(4)}, 6–2
Loss	1–1	Jun 2024	ITF Monastir, Tunisia	W15	Hard	(Indonesia) Janice Tjen	1–6, 6–7^{(1)}
Loss	1–2	Mar 2025	ITF Sharm El Sheikh, Egypt	W15	Hard	(United States) Carolyn Ansari	2–6, 6–3, 4–6
Win	7–11	Jun 2025	ITF Monastir, Tunisia	W15	Hard	(Egypt) Lamis Alhussein Abdel Aziz	6–0, 5–7, 6–3

=== Doubles: 24 (10 titles, 14 runner-ups) ===
Legend W25/35 tournaments W15 tournaments	Finals by surface Hard (5–10) Clay (5–4)

Result	W–L	Date	Tournament	Tier	Surface	Partner	Opponents	Score
Loss	0–1	Jul 2022	ITF Vejle, Denmark	W15	Clay	(Lithuania) Klaudija Bubelytė	(New Zealand) Valentina Ivanov (Denmark) Hannah Viller Møller	2–6, 6–7^{(4)}
Win	1–1	Sep 2022	ITF Eindhoven, Netherlands	W15	Clay	(France) Laïa Petretic	(Netherlands) Demi Tran (Netherlands) Lian Tran	4–6, 7–5, [11–9]
Win	2–1	Nov 2022	ITF Sharm El Sheikh, Egypt	W15	Hard	(New Zealand) Vivian Yang	(Slovakia) Romana Čisovská (Slovakia) Barbora Matúšová	7–5, 6–4
Loss	2–2	Oct 2022	ITF Sharm El Sheikh	W15	Hard	(Estonia) Liisa Varul	(Chinese Taipei) Cho I-hsuan (Chinese Taipei) Cho Yi-tsen	0–6, 0–6
Loss	2–3	Feb 2023	ITF Monastir, Tunisia	W15	Hard	(Belgium) Tilwith Di Girolami	(Switzerland) Leonie Küng (Germany) Chantal Sauvant	5–7, 2–6
Win	3–3	Mar 2023	ITF Heraklion, Greece	W15	Clay	(Romania) Anca Todoni	(Israel) Shavit Kimchi (Slovakia) Nina Vargová	6–3, 6–7^{(7)}, [10–5]
Loss	3–4	Apr 2023	ITF Telde, Spain	W15	Clay	(Slovakia) Irina Balus	(Australia) Kayla McPhee (Switzerland) Marie Mettraux	5–7, 2–6
Win	4–4	Jul 2023	ITF Bacau, Romania	W15	Clay	(Romania) Stefania Bojica	(Italy) Melania Delai (Italy) Greta Schieroni	w/o
Loss	4–5	Apr 2023	ITF Vigo, Spain	W25	Hard	(Italy) Anastasia Abbagnato	(Bosnia and Herzegovina) Nefisa Berberović (United Kingdom) Sarah Beth Grey	3–6, 6–4, [9–11]
Win	5–5	Oct 2023	ITF Villena, Spain	W15	Hard	(Lithuania) Andrė Lukošiūtė	(Germany) Laura Böhner (Germany) Joëlle Steur	6–4, 2–6, [10–7]
Win	6–5	Nov 2023	ITF Heraklion, Greece	W15	Clay	(Greece) Eleni Christofi	(Slovakia) Karolina Krajmer (Estonia) Andrea Roots	6–3, 6–1
Loss	6–6	Dec 2023	ITF Heraklion, Greece	W15	Clay	(Estonia) Liisa Varul	(Slovakia) Stella Kovacicová (Guatemala) Janika Kusy	6–7^{(5)}, 7–6^{(7)}, [8–10]
Win	7–6	Dec 2023	ITF Melilla, Spain	W15	Clay	(Germany) Chantal Sauvant	(Portugal) Inês Murta (Spain) Olga Parres Azcoitia	6–4, 7–5
Loss	7–7	Feb 2024	ITF Manacor, Spain	W15	Hard	(France) Laïa Petretic	(Canada) Louise Kwong (United States) Anna Ulyashchenko	1–6, 4–6
Loss	7–8	Apr 2024	ITF Monastir, Tunisia	W15	Hard	(Poland) Zuzanna Pawlikowska	(United States) Paris Corley (United States) Dasha Ivanova	6–7^{(7)}, 2–6
Loss	7–9	Jun 2024	ITF Monastir, Tunisia	W15	Hard	(Slovakia) Alica Rusova	(Canada) Leena Bennetto (Indonesia) Janice Tjen	4–6, 1–6
Loss	7–10	Jun 2024	ITF Monastir, Tunisia	W15	Hard	(Egypt) Merna Refaat	(Slovakia) Katarina Kužmová; Mariia Tkacheva	1–6, 1–6
Loss	7–11	Oct 2024	ITF Heraklion, Greece	W15	Clay	(Belgium) Tilwith Di Girolami	(Romania) Simona Ogescu (Romania) Ioana Teodora Sava	2–6, 6–0, [6–10]
Loss	7–12	Nov 2024	ITF Heraklion, Greece	W15	Clay	(Belgium) Tilwith Di Girolami	(Greece) Dimitra Pavlou (Greece) Sapfo Sakellaridi	1–2 ret.
Loss	7–13	Feb 2025	ITF Sharm El Sheikh	W15	Hard	(Japan) Mana Kawamura	(Japan) Ayumi Miyamoto (Japan) Kisa Yoshioka	6–7^{(4)}, 2–6
Loss	7–14	Feb 2025	ITF Sharm El Sheikh	W15	Hard	(Netherlands) Madelief Hageman	(Japan) Remika Ohashi (Japan) Kisa Yoshioka	3–6, 1–6
Win	8–14	May 2025	ITF Monastir, Tunisia	W15	Hard	(United Kingdom) Alicia Dudeney	(Slovakia) Mia Chudejová; Polina Leykina	6–0, 6–4
Win	9–14	Jun 2025	ITF Monastir, Tunisia	W15	Hard	(France) Astrid Cirotte	(Egypt) Lamis Alhussein Abdel Aziz (Germany) Anja Wildgruber	6–4, 6–1
Loss	9–15	Jun 2025	ITF Monastir, Tunisia	W15	Hard	(New Zealand) Elyse Tse	(Egypt) Lamis Alhussein Abdel Aziz (Egypt) Merna Refaat	4–6, 6–3, [7–10]
Win	10–15	Jul 2025	ITF Monastir, Tunisia	W35	Hard	(United Kingdom) Alicia Dudeney	(United States) Ashley Lahey (France) Tiphanie Lemaître	7–6^{(5)}, 6–4
