= Vierumäki =

Village in Heinola, Finland

Coordinates: 61°06′22″N 025°55′50″E

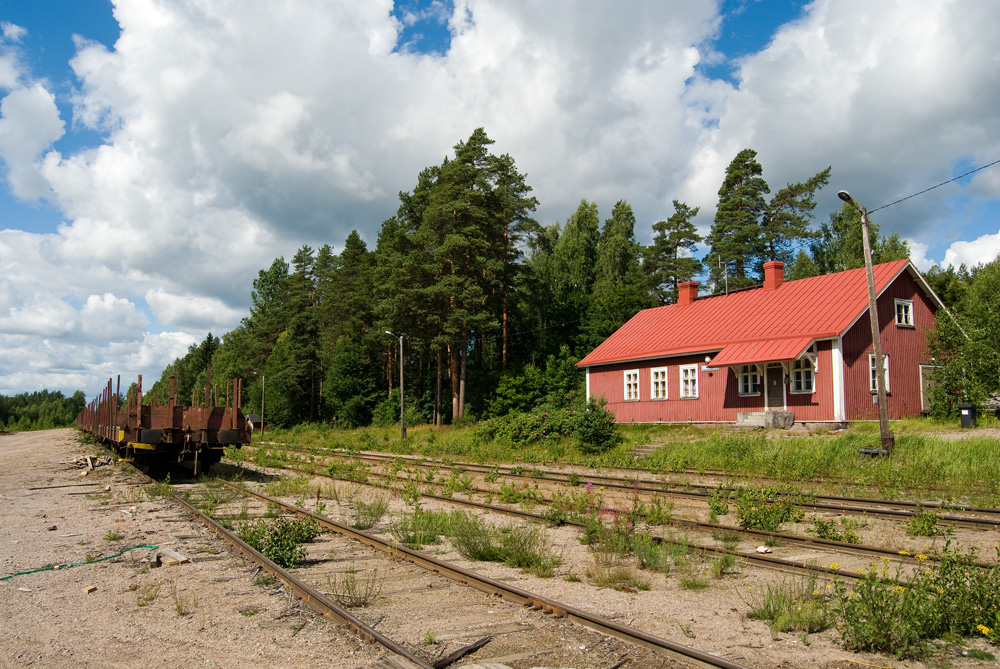
Vierumäki Ratapiha.

Vierumäki (Finnish: [ˈʋie̯ruˌmæki]) is a village located in the Finnish municipality Heinola in Päijät-Häme, Finland. There are about 900–1,000 inhabitants. Neighbouring villages are Vuolenkoski in Iitti, Myllyoja in Heinola, Mäkelä in Nastola and Urajärvi in Asikkala.

Vierumäki is known for hosting international ice hall sports events.

== Sports ==
=== Curling ===
- The 2001 European Curling Championships took place in Vierumäki, both men's and women's events won by Sweden.
- Vierumäki hosted the 2008 World Mixed Doubles Curling Championship, from March 8 to March 16, 2008, won by Switzerland.
- The 2008 World Senior Curling Championships, won by Canada.

=== Ice hockey ===
- The 2001, 2009 and 2016 4 Nations Cups all took place in Vierumäki, the first won by Canada and the other two won by the United States
- The 2008 Women's World Ice Hockey Championships, Division II took place in Vierumäki from March 25 to March 30, 2008, won by Austria.
- The 2013 IIHF World Women's U18 Championship took place in Vierumäki from December 29, 2012 to January 5, 2013, won by Canada.

== Other webpages ==
- Vierumäki webpage
