= Patrīcija Špaka =

Latvian tennis player (born 2002)

- Country (sports): Latvia
- Born: 29 August 2002 (age 23)
- Plays: Left-handed (two-handed backhand)
- Prize money: $4,119

Singles
- Career record: 6–3
- Career titles: 0
- Highest ranking: No. 1050 (9 August 2021)

Doubles
- Career record: 4–2
- Career titles: 0
- Highest ranking: No. 873 (31 October 2022)
- Current ranking: No. 933 (29 August 2022)

Team competitions
- Fed Cup: 0–1
- Last updated on: 18 April 2021.

Patrīcija Špaka (born 29 August 2002) is a Latvian tennis player.

== Career ==
Špaka represents Latvia in Billie Jean King Cup competition. She made her debut at the 2021 play-offs against India.

== ITF Circuit finals ==
=== Doubles: 1 (runner–up) ===
Legend $100,000 tournaments $80,000 tournaments $60,000 tournaments $25,000 tournaments $15,000 tournaments	Finals by surface Hard (0–1) Clay (0–0) Grass (0–0) Carpet (0–0)

Result	Date	Tournament	Tier	Surface	Partner	Opponents	Score
Loss	Nov 2019	Pärnu, Estonia	15,000	Hard (i)	(Lithuania) Iveta Daujotaitė	(Netherlands) Suzan Lamens (Russia) Anastasia Pribylova	1–6, 2–6
