= Nicole Khirin =

Israeli tennis player (born 2001)

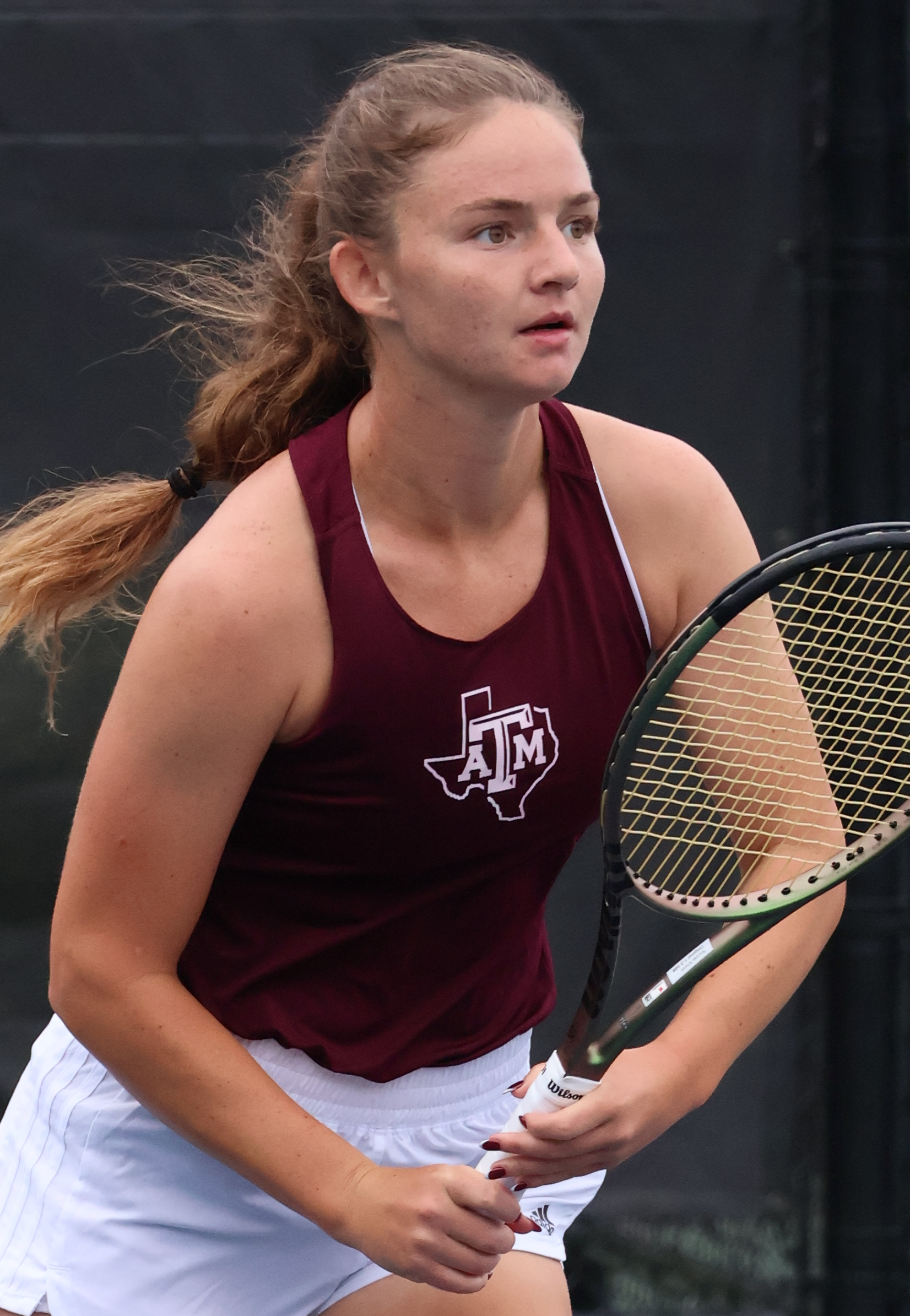
- Khirin in 2023
- Native name: ניקול חירין
- Country (sports): Israel
- Born: 16 January 2001 (age 25)
- Plays: Right-handed (two-handed backhand)
- Prize money: US$33,010

Singles
- Career record: 120–88
- Career titles: 1 ITF
- Highest ranking: No. 419 (1 August 2022)
- Current ranking: No. 829 (6 May 2024)

Doubles
- Career record: 138–100
- Career titles: 3 ITF
- Highest ranking: No. 493 (1 August 2022)
- Current ranking: No. 904 (6 May 2024)

Team competitions
- Fed Cup: 1–0
- Last updated on: 20 May 2024.

Nicole Khirin (Hebrew: ניקול חירין; born 16 January 2001) is an Israeli tennis player. She began her collegiate career with the Texas Longhorns. After one year, she transferred to the Texas A&M Aggies.

She won the NCAA championship with the Aggies in 2024, winning the clinching singles point in the final.

She has a career-high WTA singles ranking of world No. 419, achieved on 1 August 2022.

Khirin represents Israel at the Billie Jean King Cup, where she has a win–loss record of 1–0.

== ITF Circuit finals ==
=== Singles: 2 (1 title, 1 runner–up) ===
Legend $15,000 tournaments	Finals by surface Hard (1–0) Clay (0–1)

Result	W–L	Date	Tournament	Tier	Surface	Partner	Score
Loss	0–1	Aug 2021	ITF Frederiksberg, Denmark	15,000	Clay	(Czech Republic) Michaela Bayerlová	1–6, 1–6
Win	1–1	Jun 2023	ITF Nakhon Si Thammarat, Thailand	15,000	Hard	(Thailand) Anchisa Chanta	5–7, 6–4, 6–2

=== Doubles: 5 (3 titles, 2 runner–ups) ===
Legend $25,000 tournaments $15,000 tournaments	Finals by surface Hard (1–1) Clay (2–1)

Result	W–L	Date	Tournament	Tier	Surface	Partner	Opponents	Score
Loss	0–1	Jun 2021	ITF Heraklion, Greece	15,000	Clay	(Israel) Shavit Kimchi	(United States) Jessie Aney (Czech Republic) Michaela Bayerlová	4–6, 4–6
Win	1–1	Aug 2021	ITF Vejle, Denmark	15,000	Clay	(Czech Republic) Darja Viďmanová	(Ukraine) Viktoriia Dema (Japan) Eri Shimizu	7–6^{(7)}, 5–7, [10–8]
Win	2–1	Nov 2021	ITF Heraklion, Greece	15,000	Clay	(Slovakia) Radka Zelnickova	(Germany) Julia Kimmelmann (Netherlands) Lian Tran	6–2, 6–4
Win	3–1	May 2022	ITF Akko, Israel	25,000	Hard	(Israel) Shavit Kimchi	(Japan) Haruna Arakawa (Japan) Natsuho Arakawa	5–7, 7–5, [10-8]
Loss	3–2	Oct 2023	ITF Florence, United States	25,000	Hard	(United States) Ayana Akli	(United States) Abigail Rencheli (United States) Alana Smith	6–3, 6–7^{(9)}, [6-10]
