= Daniela Vismane =

Latvian tennis player (born 2000)

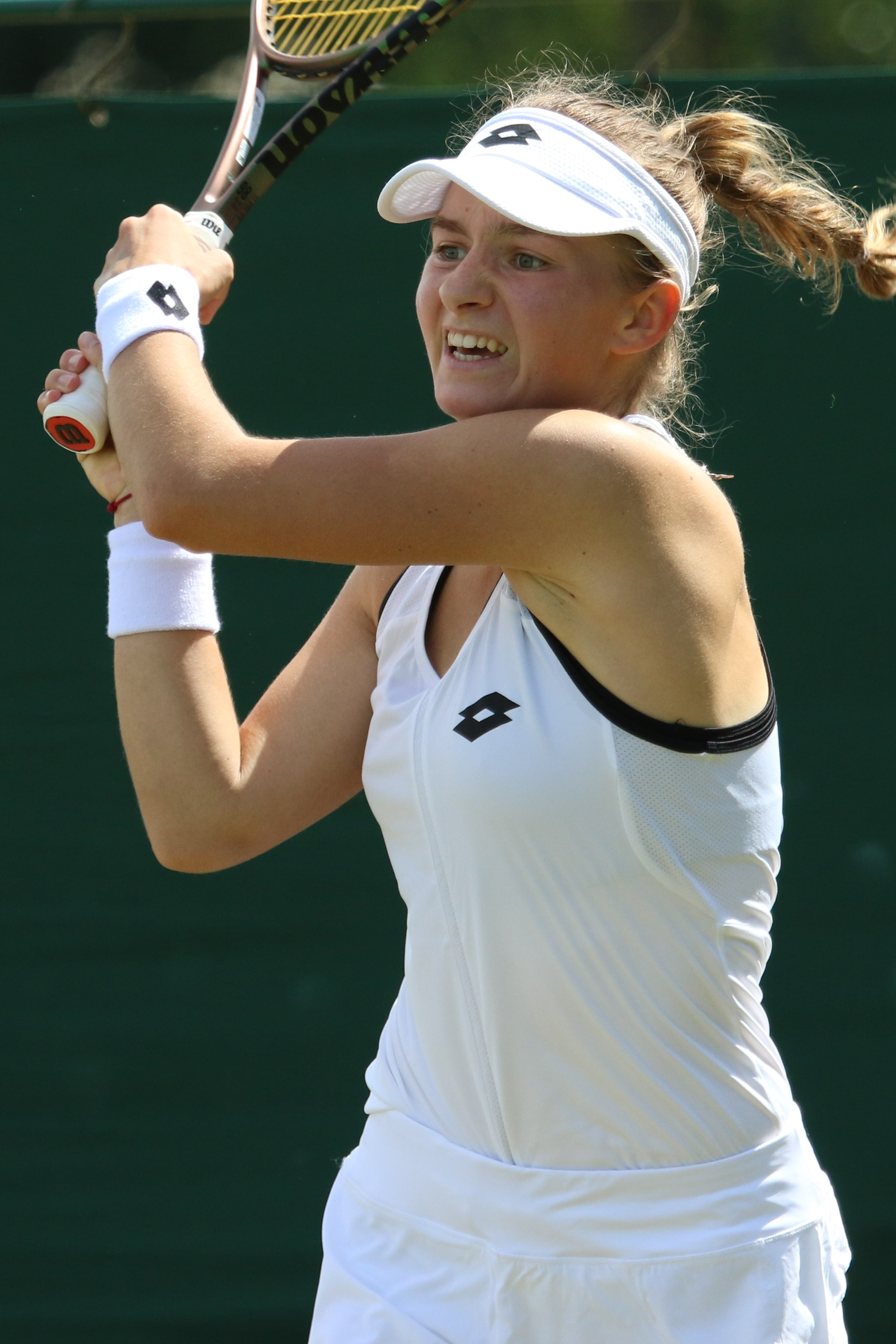
- Vismane at the 2022 Wimbledon Championships
- Country (sports): Latvia
- Born: 10 August 2000 (age 25)
- Plays: Right (two-handed both sides)
- Prize money: $155,266

Singles
- Career record: 242–163
- Career titles: 4 ITF
- Highest ranking: No. 228 (16 May 2022)
- Current ranking: No. 1118 (29 June 2026)

Grand Slam singles results
- Wimbledon: Q2 (2022)

Doubles
- Career record: 136–96
- Career titles: 11 ITF
- Highest ranking: No. 161 (24 June 2024)
- Current ranking: No. 1094 (29 June 2026)

Team competitions
- Fed Cup: 6–12
- Last updated on: 10 July 2026.

Daniela Adrija Vismane (born 10 August 2000) is a tennis player from Latvia. She has career-high WTA rankings of 228 in singles, achieved on 16 May 2022, and No. 161 in doubles, achieved on 24 June 2024. On the ITF Circuit, she has won four titles in singles and eleven in doubles.

Competing for the Latvia Fed Cup team, Vismane has a win-loss record of 6–12, as of August 2024.

== Junior years ==
=== Grand Slam performance ===
Singles:

- Australian Open: QF (2018)
- French Open: 2R (2017, 2018)
- Wimbledon: 1R (2017, 2018)
- US Open: 1R (2017)

Doubles:

- Australian Open: –
- French Open: 1R (2017)
- Wimbledon: QF (2017)
- US Open: –

== Professional tour ==
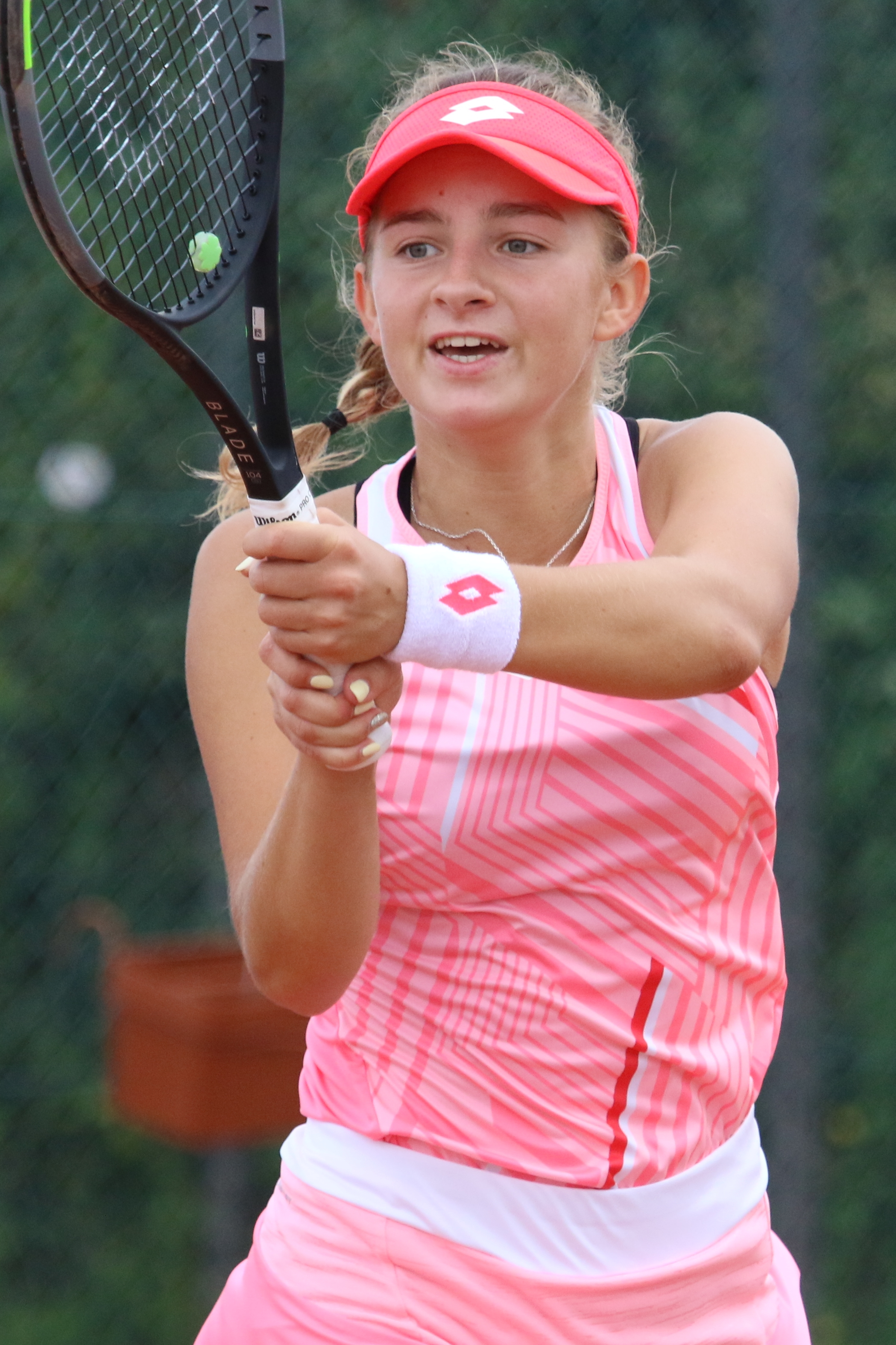
Vismane at the 2021 Open de Biarritz

She made her ITF Women's Circuit debut in May 2015 as a qualifier at the $10k tournament of Puszczykowo.

In March 2018, she reached her first semifinal at the $15k event in Mâcon, and then in July was advanced to her first final at the $15k Pärnu. In the final, she defeated Angelina Zhuravleva in three sets. A month later, she won her first doubles title at the $15k Budapest tournament, alongside Petra Januskova.

She started season of 2019 with semifinal at the $15k Stuttgart, followed up then with final of the $15k Antalya. In July, she reached her first $25k-level final in Jerusalem but lost to Jodie Burrage. Two months later, at the Baltic Open in Jūrmala, she had her first attempt for debuting at the WTA Tour but lost in qualifying. She finished year with title at the $15k event in Heraklion, after defeating Darya Astakhova.

In May 2021, she won her first $25k-level tournament in Liepāja, defeating Malene Helgø in the final.

== Grand Slam performance timeline ==
Key
W	F	SF	QF	#R	RR	Q#	DNQ	A	NH

(W) winner; (F) finalist; (SF) semifinalist; (QF) quarterfinalist; (#R) rounds 4, 3, 2, 1; (RR) round-robin stage; (Q#) qualification round; (DNQ) did not qualify; (A) absent; (NH) not held; (SR) strike rate (events won / competed); (W–L) win–loss record.
To avoid confusion and double counting, these charts are updated at the conclusion of a tournament or when the player's participation has ended.

== ITF Circuit finals ==
=== Singles: 8 (4 titles, 4 runner-ups) ===
Legend W25 tournaments (1–2) W15 tournaments (3–2)	Finals by surface Hard (0–2) Clay (4–2)

Result	W–L	Date	Tournament	Tier	Surface	Opponent	Score
Win	1–0	Jul 2018	ITF Pärnu, Estonia	W15	Clay	(Russia) Angelina Zhuravleva	4–6, 6–4, 6–2
Loss	1–1	Feb 2019	ITF Antalya, Turkey	W15	Clay	(Ukraine) Viktoriia Dema	6–4, 3–6, 3–6
Loss	1–2	May 2019	ITF Jerusalem, Israel	W25	Hard	(United Kingdom) Jodie Burrage	6–2, 2–6, 3–6
Win	2–2	Nov 2019	ITF Heraklion, Greece	W15	Clay	(Russia) Darya Astakhova	0–6, 7–6^{(5)}, 6–1
Loss	2–3	Apr 2021	ITF Monastir, Tunisia	W15	Hard	(Czech Republic) Monika Kilnarová	4–6, 6–7^{(5)}
Win	3–3	May 2021	Liepāja Open, Latvia	W25	Clay	(Norway) Malene Helgø	6–4, 6–4
Loss	3–4	Aug 2023	ITF Erwitte, Germany	W25	Clay	(Czech Republic) Nikola Bartůňková	4–6, 1–6
Win	4–4	Feb 2024	ITF Antalya, Turkey	W15	Clay	(Hungary) Amarissa Tóth	0–1 ret.

=== Doubles: 22 (11 titles, 11 runner-ups) ===
Legend W80 tournaments (0–1) W60 tournaments (2–2) W40/50 tournaments (2–2) W25/35 tournaments (6–3) W15 tournaments (1–3)	Finals by surface Hard (0–4) Clay (11–7)

Result	W–L	Date	Tournament	Tier	Surface	Partner	Opponents	Score
Win	1–0	Aug 2018	ITF Budapest, Hungary	W15	Clay	(Canada) Petra Januskova	(Czech Republic) Klara Hajková (Czech Republic) Aneta Laboutková	7–5, 3–6, [11–9]
Loss	1–1	Jan 2019	ITF Stuttgart, Germany	W15	Hard (i)	(Luxembourg) Eléonora Molinaro	(Romania) Laura Ioana Paar (Germany) Julia Wachaczyk	5–7, 0–6
Loss	1–2	Dec 2020	ITF Antalya, Turkey	W15	Hard	(Bulgaria) Gergana Topalova	(United States) Hurricane Tyra Black (Switzerland) Svenja Ochsner	6–7^{(2)}, 5–7
Loss	1–3	Apr 2021	ITF Monastir, Tunisia	W15	Hard	(Spain) Rebeka Masarova	(Romania) Karola Bejenaru (Romania) Ilona Georgiana Ghioroaie	2–6, 0–6
Win	2–3	Jul 2021	Open de Biarritz, France	W60	Clay	(Russia) Oksana Selekhmeteva	(United Kingdom) Sarah Beth Grey (Belgium) Magali Kempen	6–3, 7–6^{(5)}
Loss	2–4	Mar 2022	Guanajuato Open, Mexico	W60+H	Hard	Anastasia Tikhonova	(United States) Kaitlyn Christian; Lidziya Marozava	0–6, 2–6
Loss	2–5	May 2022	Roma Cup, Italy	W60	Clay	Darya Astakhova	(Italy) Matilde Paoletti (Italy) Lisa Pigato	3–6, 6–7^{(7)}
Loss	2–6	Nov 2022	Open Villa de Madrid, Spain	W80	Clay	(Croatia) Lea Bošković	(Spain) Aliona Bolsova (Spain) Rebeka Masarova	3–6, 3–6
Loss	2–7	Feb 2023	ITF Tucumán, Argentina	W25	Clay	(Australia) Seone Mendez	(Colombia) María Herazo González (Netherlands) Lexie Stevens	6–2, 3–6, [8–10]
Win	3–7	Mar 2023	ITF Tucumán, Argentina	W25	Clay	(Ukraine) Valeriya Strakhova	(Argentina) Guillermina Naya (Argentina) Julia Riera	6–3, 3–6, [13–11]
Win	4–7	Jul 2023	Liepāja Open, Latvia	W60	Clay	(Latvia) Darja Semenistaja	(Turkey) Çağla Büyükakçay (North Macedonia) Lina Gjorcheska	6–4, 2–6, [10–3]
Win	5–7	Jul 2023	ITF Horb, Germany	W25	Clay	Darya Astakhova	(Germany) Laura Böhner (Argentina) Berta Bonardi	6–3, 6–2
Win	6–7	Sep 2023	ITF Oldenzaal, Netherlands	W40	Clay	(Bulgaria) Gergana Topalova	(Netherlands) Isabelle Haverlag (Netherlands) Eva Vedder	7–5, 2–6, [10–5]
Win	7–7	Sep 2023	ITF Varna, Bulgaria	W25	Clay	(Italy) Lisa Pigato	(Romania) Karola Bejenaru (France) Yasmine Mansouri	7–6^{(4)}, 7-5
Loss	7–8	Sep 2023	ITF Pazardzhik, Bulgaria	W40	Clay	(Bulgaria) Gergana Topalova	(Romania) Cristina Dinu (Slovakia) Radka Zelníčková	6–1, 5–7, [6–10]
Win	8–8	Nov 2023	ITF Heraklion, Greece	W40	Clay	(Belgium) Lara Salden	(Romania) Oana Gavrilă (Greece) Sapfo Sakellaridi	6–4, 6–3
Loss	8–9	Jan 2024	ITF Antalya, Turkey	W50	Clay	(Spain) Ángela Fita Boluda	Anastasiia Gureva; Alexandra Shubladze	3–6, 2–6
Win	9–9	Feb 2024	ITF Antalya, Turkey	W35	Clay	(Spain) Ángela Fita Boluda	(Romania) Cristina Dinu (Ukraine) Oleksandra Oliynykova	6–4, 6–0
Loss	9–10	Feb 2024	ITF Antalya, Turkey	W35	Clay	(Spain) Ángela Fita Boluda	(Italy) Martina Colmegna (France) Alice Ramé	6–3, 1–6, [11–13]
Win	10–10	Feb 2024	ITF Antalya, Turkey	W35	Clay	(Spain) Ángela Fita Boluda	(Greece) Martha Matoula (Greece) Dimitra Pavlou	6–1, 6–3
Win	11–10	May 2024	ITF Platja d'Aro, Spain	W35	Clay	(Greece) Eleni Christofi	(Portugal) Matilde Jorge (Latvia) Diāna Marcinkēviča	6–4, 6–2
Loss	11–11	May 2024	ITF Annenheim, Austria	W35	Clay	(Slovenia) Nika Radišić	(Finland) Laura Hietaranta (Estonia) Elena Malõgina	6–3, 3–6, [6–10]
