= Klaudija Bubelytė =

Lithuanian tennis player (born 2003)

- Country (sports): Lithuania
- Born: 29 March 2003 (age 23)
- Plays: Right-handed
- Prize money: $38,245

Singles
- Career record: 117–64
- Career titles: 2 ITF
- Highest ranking: No. 462 (18 November 2024)
- Current ranking: No. 1413 (8 June 2026)

Doubles
- Career record: 33–43
- Career titles: 2 ITF
- Highest ranking: No. 782 (31 July 2023)

Team competitions
- Fed Cup: 11–1
- Last updated on: 12 June 2026.

Klaudija Bubelytė (born 29 March 2003) is a Lithuanian inactive tennis player.

Bubelytė has a career-high singles ranking by the WTA of 462, achieved on 18 November 2024. She also has a career-high WTA doubles ranking of 782, reached on 31 July 2023. Bubelytė has won two singles titles and two doubles titles on the ITF Circuit.

Playing for Lithuania, Bubelytė has a win–loss record of 11–1. In 2024, Bubelytė will take part in Group I next year as a result of successful matches in the Billie Jean King Cup played in Vilnius, Lithuania.

== ITF Circuit finals ==
=== Singles: 9 (2 titles, 7 runner-ups) ===
Legend W35 tournaments W15 tournaments	Finals by surface Hard (0–2) Clay (2–5)

Result	W–L	Date	Tournament	Tier	Surface	Opponent	Score
Loss	0–1	Feb 2023	ITF Sharm El Sheikh, Egypt	W15	Hard	(Spain) Lee Eun-hye	4–6, 1–6
Loss	0–2	Apr 2023	ITF Telde, Spain	W15	Clay	(Spain) Ángela Fita Boluda	6–3, 5–7, 5–7
Loss	0–3	Apr 2023	ITF Telde, Spain	W15	Clay	(Ukraine) Oleksandra Oliynykova	3–6, 1–6
Win	1–3	Nov 2023	ITF Heraklion, Greece	W15	Clay	(Romania) Carmen Andreea Herea	6–3, 6–1
Loss	1–4	Mar 2024	ITF Heraklion, Greece	W15	Clay	Ksenia Zaytseva	2–6, 5–7
Loss	1–5	Apr 2024	ITF Nottingham, United Kingdom	W35	Hard	(United Kingdom) Sonay Kartal	1–6, 4–6
Loss	1–6	Aug 2024	ITF Bielsko Biala, Poland	W15	Clay	(Poland) Daria Kuczer	4–6, 2–6
Loss	1–7	Oct 2024	ITF Heraklion, Greece	W15	Clay	(Morocco) Yasmine Kabbaj	3–6, 6–7^{(6)}
Win	2–7	Nov 2024	ITF Heraklion, Greece	W15	Clay	(Romania) Ilinca Amariei	6–2, 6–2

=== Doubles: 3 (2 titles, 1 runner-up) ===
Legend W35 tournaments W15 tournaments	Finals by surface Hard (1–0) Clay (1–1)

Result	W–L	Date	Tournament	Tier	Surface	Partner	Opponents	Score
Loss	0–1	Jul 2022	ITF Vejle, Denmark	W15	Clay	(Lithuania) Patricija Paukštytė	(New Zealand) Valentina Ivanov (Denmark) Hannah Viller Møller	2–6, 6–7^{(4)}
Win	1–1	Feb 2023	ITF Sharm El Sheikh, Egypt	W15	Hard	(Egypt) Merna Refaat	(Italy) Giuliana Bestetti (Italy) Beatrice Stagno	7–6^{(1)}, 6–4
Win	2–1	Jul 2024	ITF Savitaipale, Finland	W15	Clay	(Estonia) Anet Angelika Koskel	(Italy) Chiara Girelli (Hungary) Adrienn Nagy	1–6, 6–2, [10–6]
