= 2013 Orto-Lääkärit Open – Doubles =

Doubles
- 2013 IPP Open and the Orto-Lääkärit Open

Final
- Champions: (Latvia) Jeļena Ostapenko (Estonia) Eva Paalma
- Runners-up: (Netherlands) Quirine Lemoine (Czech Republic) Martina Přádová
- Score: 6–2, 5–7, [11–9]

Events
Singles	men	women
Doubles	men	women
← 2012 ·	IPP Open	· 2014 →
← 2012 ·	Orto-Lääkärit Open	· 2014 →

Lyudmyla and Nadiya Kichenok were the defending champions, but chose instead to compete at the Al Habtoor Tennis Challenge.

Jeļena Ostapenko and Eva Paalma won the tournament, defeating Quirine Lemoine and Martina Přádová in the final, 6–2, 5–7, [11–9].

== Seeds ==
1. (Russia) ~~Alexandra Artamonova~~ / (Russia) ~~Anna Smolina~~ (withdrew)
2. (Netherlands) Rosalie van der Hoek / (Sweden) Anette Munozova (semifinals)
3. (Latvia) Jeļena Ostapenko / (Estonia) Eva Paalma (champions)
4. (Netherlands) Quirine Lemoine / (Czech Republic) Martina Přádová (final)

== Draw ==
=== Key ===
- Q = Qualifier
- WC = Wild card
- LL = Lucky loser
- Alt = Alternate
- SE = Special exempt
- PR = Protected ranking
- ITF = ITF entry
- JE = Junior exempt
- w/o = Walkover
- r = Retired
- d = Defaulted
- SR = Special ranking

First round
(Finland) E Joronen (Finland) L Pennanen	2	0
(Finland) E Leivo (Finland) T Tuomi	6	6
4	(Netherlands) Q Lemoine (Czech Republic) M Přádová	4	7^{7}	[11]
(Finland) MN Eklund (Hungary) V Lukács	6	6^{1}	[9]
(Finland) P Piirtola (Finland) A Sillanpää	w/o
(Russia) A Rafikova (Lithuania) S Valantiejūtė
(Russia) A Artemova (Germany) N Laus	6	6
WC	(Finland) N Nylund (Finland) J Ranta-Aho	3	4
(Finland) K Parviainen (Finland) M-E Pasanen	0	1
3	(Latvia) J Ostapenko (Estonia) E Paalma	6	6
(Russia) D Afanasyeva (Russia) N Belova	1	3
WC	(Finland) L Humaloja (Finland) O Pimiä	6	6

Quarterfinals
1	(Russia) A Artamonova (Russia) A Smolina
(Finland) E Leivo (Finland) T Tuomi	w/o
4	(Netherlands) Q Lemoine (Czech Republic) M Přádová	6	6
(Finland) P Piirtola (Finland) A Sillanpää	3	1
(Russia) A Artemova (Germany) N Laus	3	0^{r}
3	(Latvia) J Ostapenko (Estonia) E Paalma	6	2
WC	(Finland) L Humaloja (Finland) O Pimiä	4	3
2	(Netherlands) R van der Hoek (Sweden) A Munozova	6	6

Semifinals
(Finland) E Leivo (Finland) T Tuomi	4	3
4	(Netherlands) Q Lemoine (Czech Republic) M Přádová	6	6
3	(Latvia) J Ostapenko (Estonia) E Paalma	6	6
2	(Netherlands) R van der Hoek (Sweden) A Munozova	2	3

Final
4	(Netherlands) Q Lemoine (Czech Republic) M Přádová	2	7	[9]
3	(Latvia) J Ostapenko (Estonia) E Paalma	6	5	[11]
