= 2013 Orto-Lääkärit Open – Singles =

Singles
- 2013 IPP Open and the Orto-Lääkärit Open

Final
- Champion: (Latvia) Jeļena Ostapenko
- Runner-up: (Sweden) Susanne Celik
- Score: 7–5, 4–6, 7–5

Events
| Singles | men | women |
| Doubles | men | women |
| ← 2012 · | IPP Open | · 2014 → |
| ← 2012 · | Orto-Lääkärit Open | · 2014 → |

Amra Sadiković was the defending champion, having won the event in 2012, but chose not to participate in 2013.

Jeļena Ostapenko won the tournament, defeating Susanne Celik in the final, 7–5, 4–6, 7–5.

== Seeds ==
1. (Russia) ~~Alexandra Artamonova~~ (withdrew)
2. (Sweden) Susanne Celik (final)
3. (Latvia) Jeļena Ostapenko (champion)
4. (Hungary) Vanda Lukács (second round; retired)
5. (Finland) ~~Piia Suomalainen~~ (withdrew)
6. (Russia) Anna Smolina (semifinals)
7. (Netherlands) Quirine Lemoine (semifinals)
8. (Sweden) Anette Munozova (second round)

== Main draw ==
=== Key ===
- Q = Qualifier
- WC = Wild card
- LL = Lucky loser
- Alt = Alternate
- SE = Special exempt
- PR = Protected ranking
- ITF = ITF entry
- JE = Junior exempt
- w/o = Walkover
- r = Retired
- d = Defaulted
- SR = Special ranking

=== Finals ===
Semifinals
6 | (Russia) Anna Smolina | 4 | 2
3 | (Latvia) Jeļena Ostapenko | 6 | 6
7 | (Netherlands) Quirine Lemoine | 2 | 4
2 | (Sweden) Susanne Celik | 6 | 6

Final
3 | (Latvia) Jeļena Ostapenko | 7 | 4 | 7
2 | (Sweden) Susanne Celik | 5 | 6 | 5

=== Top half ===
First round
LL | (Russia) M Gasymova | 0 | 2
(Netherlands) R van der Hoek | 6 | 6
(Germany) GM Mpassy-Nzoumba | 1 | 3
WC | (Finland) O Pimiä | 6 | 6
Q | (Sweden) F Östlund | 7 | 6
(Finland) MN Eklund | 5 | 4
Q | (Finland) E Joronen | 0 | 1
6 | (Russia) A Smolina | 6 | 6
3 | (Latvia) J Ostapenko | 6 | 6
WC | (Finland) J Ranta-Aho | 0 | 0
Q | (Russia) A Artemova | 7 | 2 | 2
(Estonia) B Burk | 5 | 6 | 6
(Estonia) E Paalma | 6 | 6
Q | (Finland) A Sillanpää | 2 | 4
Q | (Finland) R Timonen | 3 | 2
8 | (Sweden) A Munozova | 6 | 6

Second round
(Netherlands) R van der Hoek | 3 | 6 | 6
WC | (Finland) O Pimiä | 6 | 4 | 1
Q | (Sweden) F Östlund | 6 | 4 | 2
6 | (Russia) A Smolina | 4 | 6 | 6
3 | (Latvia) J Ostapenko | 6 | 6
(Estonia) B Burk | 1 | 3
(Estonia) E Paalma | 6 | 6
8 | (Sweden) A Munozova | 2 | 1

Quarterfinals
(Netherlands) R van der Hoek | 1 | 0^{r}
6 | (Russia) A Smolina | 6 | 0
3 | (Latvia) J Ostapenko | 6 | 1 | 6
(Estonia) E Paalma | 0 | 6 | 2

Semifinals
6 | (Russia) A Smolina | 4 | 2
3 | (Latvia) J Ostapenko | 6 | 6

=== Bottom half ===
First round
7 | (Netherlands) Q Lemoine | 6 | 7^{8}
(Czech Republic) M Přádová | 2 | 6^{6}
Q | (Russia) Y Parshina | 6 | 6
Q | (United Kingdom) R Berisha | 4 | 3
(Finland) M-E Pasanen | 4 | 4
WC | (Finland) P Piirtola | 6 | 6
(Finland) T Tuomi | 4 | 4
4 | (Hungary) V Lukács | 6 | 6
LL | (Finland) K Parviainen | 1 | 4
(Russia) N Belova | 6 | 6
(Finland) E Leivo | 6 | 6
Q | (Estonia) V Gorlats | 3 | 4
WC | (Finland) N Nylund | 3 | 3
(Russia) D Afanasyeva | 6 | 6
(Finland) H Tolonen | 2 | 2
2 | (Sweden) S Celik | 6 | 6

Second round
7 | (Netherlands) Q Lemoine | 6 | 6
Q | (Russia) Y Parshina | 2 | 4
WC | (Finland) P Piirtola | 6 | 3
4 | (Hungary) V Lukács | 2 | 1^{r}
(Russia) N Belova | 6^{3} | 6^{2}
(Finland) E Leivo | 7^{7} | 7^{7}
(Russia) D Afanasyeva | 3 | 4
2 | (Sweden) S Celik | 6 | 6

Quarterfinals
7 | (Netherlands) Q Lemoine | 6 | 7^{9}
WC | (Finland) P Piirtola | 1 | 6^{7}
(Finland) E Leivo | 4 | 2
2 | (Sweden) S Celik | 6 | 6

Semifinals
7 | (Netherlands) Q Lemoine | 2 | 4
2 | (Sweden) S Celik | 6 | 6
