= 2013 IPP Open – Doubles =

Doubles
- 2013 IPP Open and the Orto-Lääkärit Open

Final
- Champions: (Finland) Henri Kontinen (Finland) Jarkko Nieminen
- Runners-up: (Germany) Dustin Brown (Germany) Philipp Marx
- Score: 7–5, 5–7, [10–5]

Events
Singles	men	women
Doubles	men	women
← 2012 ·	IPP Open	· 2014 →
← 2012 ·	Orto-Lääkärit Open	· 2014 →

Mikhail Elgin and Igor Zelenay were the defending champions, but Zelenay did not participate that year. Elgin played alongside Michal Mertiňák and they lost in the quarterfinals to Henri Kontinen and Jarkko Nieminen, who won the title, defeating Dustin Brown and Philipp Marx in the final, 7–5, 5–7, [10–5].

== Seeds ==
1. (Poland) Tomasz Bednarek / (Australia) Rameez Junaid (semifinals)
2. (Czech Republic) František Čermák / (Austria) Philipp Oswald (quarterfinals)
3. (Russia) Mikhail Elgin / (Slovakia) Michal Mertiňák (quarterfinals)
4. (Germany) Dustin Brown / (Germany) Philipp Marx (final)

== Draw ==
=== Key ===
- Q = Qualifier
- WC = Wild card
- LL = Lucky loser
- Alt = Alternate
- SE = Special exempt
- PR = Protected ranking
- ITF = ITF entry
- JE = Junior exempt
- w/o = Walkover
- r = Retired
- d = Defaulted
- SR = Special ranking

First round
1	(Poland) T Bednarek (Australia) R Junaid	6	7^{11}
(Russia) E Donskoy (Russia) A Kuznetsov	3	6^{9}
(Moldova) R Albot (Ukraine) I Marchenko	1	6	11
WC	(Switzerland) H Laaksonen (Finland) H Pöllänen	6	1	9
3	(Russia) M Elgin (Slovakia) M Mertiňák	3	6	[10]
(Austria) S Bader (Croatia) A Pavić	6	3	[6]
(Belgium) N Desein (Hungary) M Fucsovics	5	1
(Finland) H Kontinen (Finland) J Nieminen	7	6
WC	(Finland) J Paukku (Finland) H Sillanpää	4	7^{7}	7
(Australia) J Kerr (Russia) K Kravchuk	6	6^{5}	10
(Finland) M Kontinen (Denmark) F Nielsen	6^{3}	3
4	(Germany) D Brown (Germany) P Marx	7^{7}	6
(Sweden) A Siljeström (Serbia) G Tošić	6^{3}	7^{7}	[10]
(Belarus) S Betov (Belarus) A Bury	7^{7}	6^{5}	[5]
WC	(Finland) Sami Huurinainen (Finland) Aaro Pöllänen	3	0
2	(Czech Republic) F Čermák (Poland) P Oswald	6	6

Quarterfinals
1	(Poland) T Bednarek (Australia) R Junaid	6	6
(Moldova) R Albot (Ukraine) I Marchenko	2	1
3	(Russia) M Elgin (Slovakia) M Mertiňák	4	2
(Finland) H Kontinen (Finland) J Nieminen	6	6
(Australia) J Kerr (Russia) K Kravchuk	7^{7}	4	[5]
4	(Germany) D Brown (Germany) P Marx	6^{4}	6	[10]
(Sweden) A Siljeström (Serbia) G Tošić	6	4	[10]
2	(Czech Republic) F Čermák (Poland) P Oswald	3	6	[8]

Semifinals
1	(Poland) T Bednarek (Australia) R Junaid	3	3
(Finland) H Kontinen (Finland) J Nieminen	6	6
4	(Germany) D Brown (Germany) P Marx	6	3	[10]
(Sweden) A Siljeström (Serbia) G Tošić	2	6	[7]

Final
(Finland) H Kontinen (Finland) J Nieminen	7	5	[10]
4	(Germany) D Brown (Germany) P Marx	5	7	[5]
