= 2014 Orto-Lääkärit Open – Doubles =

Doubles
- 2014 IPP Open and the Orto-Lääkärit Open

Final
- Champions: (Finland) Emma Laine (Russia) Eugeniya Pashkova
- Runners-up: (Finland) Mia Nicole Eklund (Finland) Olivia Pimiä
- Score: 6–4, 6–0

Events
Singles	men	women
Doubles	men	women
← 2013 ·	IPP Open	· 2015 →
← 2013 ·	Orto-Lääkärit Open	· 2015 →

Jeļena Ostapenko and Eva Paalma were the defending champions, but neither player chose to participate this year.

Emma Laine and Eugeniya Pashkova won the title, defeating Mia Nicole Eklund and Olivia Pimiä in the final, 6–4, 6–0.

== Seeds ==
1. (Finland) Emma Laine / (Russia) Eugeniya Pashkova (champions)
2. (Russia) Anastasia Bukhanko / (Hungary) Vanda Lukács (first round/quarterfinals)

== Draw ==
=== Key ===
- Q = Qualifier
- WC = Wild card
- LL = Lucky loser
- Alt = Alternate
- SE = Special exempt
- PR = Protected ranking
- ITF = ITF entry
- JE = Junior exempt
- w/o = Walkover
- r = Retired
- d = Defaulted
- SR = Special ranking

First round/Quarterfinals
1	(Finland) E Laine (Russia) E Pashkova	6	6
(Russia) A Nefedova (Russia) P Novoselova	1	3
(Russia) N Belova (Russia) A Vostrikova	1	4
(Finland) N Nylund (Finland) L Pennanen	6	6
(Russia) D Afanasyeva (Russia) A Artamonova	6^{4}	6	[10]
(Estonia) V Gorlats (Finland) E Leivo	7^{7}	3	[3]
(Finland) MN Eklund (Finland) O Pimiä	3	6	[10]
2	(Russia) A Bukhanko (Hungary) V Lukács	6	1	[8]

Semifinals
1	(Finland) E Laine (Russia) E Pashkova	6	6
(Finland) N Nylund (Finland) L Pennanen	2	3
(Russia) D Afanasyeva (Russia) A Artamonova	4	7	[8]
(Finland) MN Eklund (Finland) O Pimiä	6	5	[10]

Final
1	(Finland) E Laine (Russia) E Pashkova	6	6
(Finland) MN Eklund (Finland) O Pimiä	4	0
