= 2014 IPP Open – Singles =

Singles
- 2014 IPP Open and the Orto-Lääkärit Open

Final
- Champion: (Estonia) Jürgen Zopp
- Runner-up: (Israel) Dudi Sela
- Score: 6–4, 5–7, 7–6^{(8–6)}

Events
Singles	men	women
Doubles	men	women
← 2013 ·	IPP Open	· 2015 →
← 2013 ·	Orto-Lääkärit Open	· 2015 →

Jarkko Nieminen was the defending champion, but he lost in the first round to Jürgen Zopp, who won the title, defeating Dudi Sela in the final, 6–4, 5–7, 7–6^{(8–6)}.

== Seeds ==
1. (Finland) Jarkko Nieminen (first round)
2. (Lithuania) Ričardas Berankis (quarterfinals)
3. (Germany) Tobias Kamke (first round)
4. (Bosnia and Herzegovina) Damir Džumhur (second round)
5. (Germany) Peter Gojowczyk (withdrew due to fever)
6. (Israel) Dudi Sela (final)
7. (Turkey) Marsel İlhan (first round)
8. (Romania) Victor Hănescu (quarterfinals)

== Draw ==
=== Key ===
- Q = Qualifier
- WC = Wild card
- LL = Lucky loser
- Alt = Alternate
- SE = Special exempt
- PR = Protected ranking
- ITF = ITF entry
- JE = Junior exempt
- w/o = Walkover
- r = Retired
- d = Defaulted
- SR = Special ranking

=== Finals ===
Semifinals
WC	(Estonia) Jürgen Zopp	6	6
LL	(Belarus) Egor Gerasimov	4	0
(Slovakia) Norbert Gomboš	1	3
6	(Israel) Dudi Sela	6	6

Final
WC	(Estonia) Jürgen Zopp	6	5	7^{8}
6	(Israel) Dudi Sela	4	7	6^{6}

=== Top half ===
First round
1	(Finland) J Nieminen	6	3	0
WC	(Estonia) J Zopp	3	6	6
(Italy) M Viola	3	6	6^{5}
WC	(Finland) M Kontinen	6	4	7^{7}
(Germany) M Bachinger	6	6
(Poland) M Przysiężny	4	1
(Italy) R Marcora	3	2
8	(Romania) V Hănescu	6	6
3	(Germany) T Kamke	3	3
WC	(Switzerland) H Laaksonen	6	6
Q	(Sweden) P Rosenholm	6	7^{7}
WC	(Finland) J Paukku	2	6^{3}
Q	(Sweden) E Ymer	7	3	7
Q	(Moldova) M Dubarenco	5	6	5
Q	(Russia) P Davydenko	3	0^{r}
LL	(Belarus) E Gerasimov	6	1

Second round
WC	(Estonia) J Zopp	6	2	7^{7}
WC	(Finland) M Kontinen	1	6	6^{4}
(Germany) M Bachinger	4	3
8	(Romania) V Hănescu	6	6
WC	(Switzerland) H Laaksonen	6	6
Q	(Sweden) P Rosenholm	1	4
Q	(Sweden) E Ymer	5	6	6^{6}
LL	(Belarus) E Gerasimov	7	2	7^{8}

Quarterfinals
WC	(Estonia) J Zopp	6	6
8	(Romania) V Hănescu	3	3
WC	(Switzerland) H Laaksonen	2	4
LL	(Belarus) E Gerasimov	6	6

Semifinals
WC	(Estonia) J Zopp	6	6
LL	(Belarus) E Gerasimov	4	0

=== Bottom half ===
First round
7	(Turkey) M İlhan	7	2	3
(Slovakia) N Gomboš	5	6	6
PR	(Germany) P Petzschner	4	6	1
(Russia) A Karatsev	6	1	6
(Belgium) N Desein	6	6
(Spain) E López-Pérez	3	3
(Bosnia and Herzegovina) A Šetkić	6	2	4
4	(Bosnia and Herzegovina) D Džumhur	2	6	6
6	(Israel) D Sela	6	6
(Republic of Ireland) L Sorensen	2	0
(Germany) D Brands	5	5
(Belgium) K Coppejans	7	7
(Moldova) R Albot	6	4	4
(Slovakia) J Kovalík	4	6	6
(Germany) T Pütz	2	2
2	(Lithuania) R Berankis	6	6

Second round
(Slovakia) N Gomboš	6	6
(Russia) A Karatsev	3	4
(Belgium) N Desein	3	6	6
4	(Bosnia and Herzegovina) D Džumhur	6	4	1
6	(Israel) D Sela	6	7^{7}
(Belgium) K Coppejans	3	6^{3}
(Slovakia) J Kovalík	6^{1}	2
2	(Lithuania) R Berankis	7^{7}	6

Quarterfinals
(Slovakia) N Gomboš	6	6
(Belgium) N Desein	0	2
6	(Israel) D Sela	6	6
2	(Lithuania) R Berankis	1	4

Semifinals
(Slovakia) N Gomboš	1	3
6	(Israel) D Sela	6	6
