= 2014 IPP Open – Doubles =

Doubles
- 2014 IPP Open and the Orto-Lääkärit Open

Final
- Champions: (Finland) Henri Kontinen (Finland) Jarkko Nieminen
- Runners-up: (United Kingdom) Jonathan Marray (Germany) Philipp Petzschner
- Score: 7–6^{(7–2)}, 6–4

Events
Singles	men	women
Doubles	men	women
← 2013 ·	IPP Open	· 2015 →
← 2013 ·	Orto-Lääkärit Open	· 2015 →

Henri Kontinen and Jarkko Nieminen were the defending champions, and they successfully defended their title, beating Jonathan Marray and Philipp Petzschner in the final, 7–6^{(7–2)}, 6–4.

== Seeds ==
1. (Finland) Henri Kontinen / (Finland) Jarkko Nieminen (champions)
2. (Belarus) Sergey Betov / (Belarus) Alexander Bury (first round)
3. (Germany) Martin Emmrich / (Sweden) Andreas Siljeström (semifinals)
4. (Moldova) Radu Albot / (Spain) Enrique López-Pérez (first round)

== Draw ==
=== Key ===
- Q = Qualifier
- WC = Wild card
- LL = Lucky loser
- Alt = Alternate
- SE = Special exempt
- PR = Protected ranking
- ITF = ITF entry
- JE = Junior exempt
- w/o = Walkover
- r = Retired
- d = Defaulted
- SR = Special ranking

=== Draw ===
First round
1	(Finland) H Kontinen (Finland) J Nieminen	6	2	[10]
WC	(Finland) Noah Johansen (Finland) J Paukku	1	6	[1]
(Belarus) E Gerasimov (Belarus) Y Shyla	6	7^{7}
(Sweden) I Arvidsson (Sweden) P Rosenholm	3	6^{5}
3	(Germany) M Emmrich (Sweden) A Siljeström	7^{7}	7^{2}
(Finland) Aaro Pöllänen (Finland) E Ruusuvuori	6^{1}	6^{2}
(Finland) M Kontinen (Switzerland) H Laaksonen	6	6
(Moldova) M Dubarenco (Russia) A Karatsev	2	4
WC	(Sweden) Lucas Renard (Finland) Jesper Saarni	4	3
(Netherlands) S Arends (United Kingdom) D Walsh	6	6
(United Kingdom) J Marray (Germany) P Petzschner	6	6
4	(Moldova) R Albot (Spain) E López-Pérez	3	2
WC	(Finland) Alex Hedman (Finland) Panu Virtanen	6	6
(Bosnia and Herzegovina) D Džumhur (Bosnia and Herzegovina) A Šetkić	2	1
(Romania) P Grigoriu (Romania) C Pavăl	6^{3}	6	[10]
2	(Belarus) S Betov (Belarus) A Bury	7^{7}	4	[5]

Quarterfinals
1	(Finland) H Kontinen (Finland) J Nieminen	7	7^{7}
(Belarus) E Gerasimov (Belarus) Y Shyla	5	6^{5}
3	(Germany) M Emmrich (Sweden) A Siljeström	6	6
(Finland) M Kontinen (Switzerland) H Laaksonen	4	2
(Netherlands) S Arends (United Kingdom) D Walsh	1	4
(United Kingdom) J Marray (Germany) P Petzschner	6	6
WC	(Finland) A Hedman (Finland) P Virtanen	4	2
(Romania) P Grigoriu (Romania) C Pavăl	6	6

Semifinals
1	(Finland) H Kontinen (Finland) J Nieminen	6	7^{7}
3	(Germany) M Emmrich (Sweden) A Siljeström	4	6^{5}
(United Kingdom) J Marray (Germany) P Petzschner	6	3	[12]
(Romania) P Grigoriu (Romania) C Pavăl	0	6	[10]

Final
1	(Finland) H Kontinen (Finland) J Nieminen	7^{7}	6
(United Kingdom) J Marray (Germany) P Petzschner	6^{2}	4
