= 2013 IPP Open – Singles =

Tennis tournament

Singles
- 2013 IPP Open and the Orto-Lääkärit Open

Final
- Champion: (Finland) Jarkko Nieminen
- Runner-up: (Lithuania) Ričardas Berankis
- Score: 6–3, 6–1

Events
Singles	men	women
Doubles	men	women
← 2012 ·	IPP Open	· 2014 →
← 2012 ·	Orto-Lääkärit Open	· 2014 →

Lukáš Lacko was the defending champion, but lost to Jan-Lennard Struff in quarterfinals.
Jarkko Nieminen won the title, beating Ričardas Berankis in the final, 6–3, 6–1.

== Seeds ==
1. (Finland) Jarkko Nieminen (champion)
2. (Poland) Łukasz Kubot (first round)
3. (Slovakia) Lukáš Lacko (quarterfinals)
4. (Russia) Evgeny Donskoy (first round)
5. (Germany) Jan-Lennard Struff (semifinals)
6. (Kazakhstan) Andrey Golubev (first round)
7. (Austria) Andreas Haider-Maurer (second round)
8. (Germany) Dustin Brown (first round)

== Draw ==
=== Key ===
- Q = Qualifier
- WC = Wild card
- LL = Lucky loser
- Alt = Alternate
- SE = Special exempt
- PR = Protected ranking
- ITF = ITF entry
- JE = Junior exempt
- w/o = Walkover
- r = Retired
- d = Defaulted
- SR = Special ranking

=== Finals ===
Semifinals
1/WC	(Finland) Jarkko Nieminen	7	2	7^{7}
5	(Germany) Jan-Lennard Struff	5	6	6^{5}
(Switzerland) Henri Laaksonen	4	4
(Lithuania) Ričardas Berankis	6	6

Final
1/WC	(Finland) Jarkko Nieminen	6	6
(Lithuania) Ričardas Berankis	3	1

=== Top half ===
First round
1/WC	(Finland) J Nieminen	6	6
(Russia) K Kravchuk	4	1
Q	(Sweden) J Adaktusson	2	2
(France) L Pouille	6	6
(Russia) A Kuznetsov	6	6
Q	(Russia) D Matsukevich	3	3
(Turkey) M İlhan	7	6
6	(Kazakhstan) A Golubev	5	4
3	(Slovakia) L Lacko	6	6
(United Kingdom) D Cox	1	4
(Germany) M Bachinger	6	6
WC	(Russia) K Khachanov	2	4
(Hungary) M Fucsovics	3	4
Q	(Croatia) A Pavic	6	6
(Romania) V Crivoi	1	1
5	(Germany) J-L Struff	6	6

Second round
1/WC	(Finland) J Nieminen	6	6
(France) L Pouille	4	3
(Russia) A Kuznetsov	7	7^{2}
(Turkey) M İlhan	5	6^{2}
3	(Slovakia) L Lacko	7^{7}	7^{8}
(Germany) M Bachinger	6^{4}	6^{6}
Q	(Croatia) A Pavic	3	2
5	(Germany) J-L Struff	6	6

Quarterfinals
1/WC	(Finland) J Nieminen	6	6
(Russia) A Kuznetsov	3	0
3	(Slovakia) L Lacko	1	1^{r}
5	(Germany) J-L Struff	6	3

Semifinals
1/WC	(Finland) J Nieminen	7	2	7^{7}
5	(Germany) J-L Struff	5	6	6^{5}

=== Bottom half ===
First round
8	(Germany) D Brown	6^{4}	7	1
(Switzerland) H Laaksonen	7^{7}	5	6
(Moldova) R Albot	6	6
(Germany) B Phau	2	4
WC	(Finland) H Pöllänen	6^{4}	6	4
WC	(Finland) M Kontinen	7^{7}	3	6
(Ukraine) I Marchenko	7^{7}	6
4	(Russia) E Donskoy	6^{4}	3
7	(Austria) A Haider-Maurer	6	6
(Belarus) D Zhyrmont	3	4
Q	(Belarus) E Gerasimov	7^{9}	7
(Germany) M Berrer	6^{7}	5
(Lithuania) R Berankis	6	6
(Canada) F Dancevic	3	2
(Belgium) N Desein	7	6
2	(Poland) Ł Kubot	5	2

Second round
(Switzerland) H Laaksonen	6	7^{8}
(Moldova) R Albot	3	6^{6}
WC	(Finland) M Kontinen	4	2
(Ukraine) I Marchenko	6	6
7	(Austria) A Haider-Maurer	5	1
Q	(Belarus) E Gerasimov	7	6
(Lithuania) R Berankis	6	6
(Belgium) N Desein	3	4

Quarterfinals
(Switzerland) H Laaksonen	6	7^{7}
(Ukraine) I Marchenko	2	6^{5}
Q	(Belarus) E Gerasimov	2	6	2
(Lithuania) R Berankis	6	3	6

Semifinals
(Switzerland) H Laaksonen	4	4
(Lithuania) R Berankis	6	6
