= 2022 Amstelveen Women's Open – Singles =

Singles
- 2022 Amstelveen Women's Open

Final
- Champion: (Switzerland) Simona Waltert
- Runner-up: (United States) Emma Navarro
- Score: 7–6^{(12–10)}, 6–0

Events
Singles	Doubles
← 2021 ·	Amstelveen Women's Open	· 2023 →

Quirine Lemoine was the defending champion but lost in the semifinals to Simona Waltert.

Waltert went on to win the title, defeating Emma Navarro in the final, 7–6^{(12–10)}, 6–0.

== Seeds ==
1. Anastasia Tikhonova (first round)
2. (Netherlands) Suzan Lamens (quarterfinals)
3. (Switzerland) Joanne Züger (first round)
4. (Switzerland) Simona Waltert (champion)
5. (Bosnia and Herzegovina) Dea Herdželaš (first round)
6. (Spain) Aliona Bolsova (quarterfinals)
7. (Czech Republic) Sára Bejlek (semifinals)
8. (Bulgaria) Isabella Shinikova (second round)

== Draw ==
=== Key ===
- Q = Qualifier
- WC = Wild card
- LL = Lucky loser
- Alt = Alternate
- SE = Special exempt
- PR = Protected ranking
- ITF = ITF entry
- JE = Junior exempt
- w/o = Walkover
- r = Retired
- d = Defaulted
- SR = Special ranking

=== Finals ===
Semifinals
7	(Czech Republic) Sára Bejlek	6	6^{3}	3
(United States) Emma Navarro	4	7^{7}	6
4	(Switzerland) Simona Waltert	6	6
(Netherlands) Quirine Lemoine	3	4

Final
(United States) Emma Navarro	6^{10}	0
4	(Switzerland) Simona Waltert	7^{12}	6

=== Top half ===
First round
1	A Tikhonova	5	5
WC	(Netherlands) L Stevens	7	7
Q	(Germany) T Morderger	6	6^{7}	4
Q	(Austria) B Haas	3	7^{9}	6
Q	(France) S Cakarevic	6	4	6
(Italy) F Di Sarra	3	6	2
Q	(Romania) A Prisăcariu	3	6	5
7	(Czech Republic) S Bejlek	6	0	7
3	(Switzerland) J Züger	2	3
(United States) E Navarro	6	6
Q	D Shnaider	2	6^{5}
(Latvia) D Vismane	6	7^{7}
LL	(Israel) N Khirin	6	2	4
(Austria) S Kraus	2	6	6
(Croatia) T Lukas	6	3	3
6	(Spain) A Bolsova	2	6	6

Second round
WC	(Netherlands) L Stevens	7	3	2
Q	(Austria) B Haas	5	6	6
Q	(France) S Cakarevic	3	6	0
7	(Czech Republic) S Bejlek	6	4	6
(United States) E Navarro	6	6
(Latvia) D Vismane	4	3
(Austria) S Kraus	3	2
6	(Spain) A Bolsova	6	6

Quarterfinals
Q	(Austria) B Haas	2	1
7	(Czech Republic) S Bejlek	6	6
(United States) E Navarro	4	6	7
6	(Spain) A Bolsova	6	2	5

Semifinals
7	(Czech Republic) S Bejlek	6	6^{3}	3
(United States) E Navarro	4	7^{7}	6

=== Bottom half ===
First round
8	(Bulgaria) I Shinikova	6	7
Q	(Czech Republic) J Marková	2	5
WC	(Netherlands) S Visscher	3	0
(Croatia) A Ružić	6	6
(Bosnia and Herzegovina) N Berberović	6	6
WC	(Netherlands) J Gimbrère	1	2
D Astakhova	1	3
4	(Switzerland) S Waltert	6	6
5	(Bosnia and Herzegovina) D Herdželaš	1	3
Q	(United States) E Oosterhout	6	6
(Netherlands) Q Lemoine	6	7
(Japan) K Nara	2	5
WC	(Netherlands) M Hoedt	6^{2}	5
(Netherlands) E Vedder	7^{7}	7
Q	(Netherlands) A Vrancken Peeters	6^{6}	6^{3}
2	(Netherlands) S Lamens	7^{8}	7^{7}

Second round
8	(Bulgaria) I Shinikova	3	6	4
(Croatia) A Ružić	6	2	6
(Bosnia and Herzegovina) N Berberović	3	0
4	(Switzerland) S Waltert	6	6
Q	(United States) E Oosterhout	6^{3}	1
(Netherlands) Q Lemoine	7^{7}	6
(Netherlands) E Vedder	2	4
2	(Netherlands) S Lamens	6	6

Quarterfinals
(Croatia) A Ružić	4	7^{10}	6^{7}
4	(Switzerland) S Waltert	6	6^{8}	7^{9}
(Netherlands) Q Lemoine	6	7^{8}
2	(Netherlands) S Lamens	4	6^{6}

Semifinals
4	(Switzerland) S Waltert	6	6
(Netherlands) Q Lemoine	3	4
