= 2022 Amstelveen Women's Open – Doubles =

Doubles
- 2022 Amstelveen Women's Open

Final
- Champions: (Spain) Aliona Bolsova (Spain) Guiomar Maristany
- Runners-up: (Czech Republic) Michaela Bayerlová (Czech Republic) Aneta Laboutková
- Score: 6–2, 6–2

Events
Singles	Doubles
← 2021 ·	Amstelveen Women's Open	· 2023 →

Suzan Lamens and Quirine Lemoine were the defending champions but chose not to participate.

Aliona Bolsova and Guiomar Maristany won the title, defeating Michaela Bayerlová and Aneta Laboutková in the final, 6–2, 6–2.

== Seeds ==
1. (Venezuela) Andrea Gámiz / (Netherlands) Eva Vedder (quarterfinals)
2. (Spain) Aliona Bolsova / (Spain) Guiomar Maristany (champions)
3. Darya Astakhova / (Latvia) Daniela Vismane (quarterfinals)
4. (Netherlands) Jasmijn Gimbrère / (Netherlands) Isabelle Haverlag (semifinals)

== Draw ==
=== Key ===
- Q = Qualifier
- WC = Wild card
- LL = Lucky loser
- Alt = Alternate
- SE = Special exempt
- PR = Protected ranking
- ITF = ITF entry
- JE = Junior exempt
- w/o = Walkover
- r = Retired
- d = Defaulted
- SR = Special ranking

=== Draw ===
First round
(Czech Republic) M Bayerlová (Czech Republic) A Laboutková	6	6
(Netherlands) D Tran (Netherlands) L Tran	3	1
3	D Astakhova (Latvia) D Vismane	7	6
(United States) N Redelijk (Netherlands) B Spee	5	0
(Germany) T Morderger (Germany) Y Morderger	2	7^{7}	[10]
E Garkusha; A Tikhonova	6	6^{4}	[2]
(Netherlands) N Liauw a Fong (Netherlands) G Mujan	6	3	[7]
(Bosnia and Herzegovina) D Herdželaš (Croatia) T Lukas	3	6	[10]
D Shnaider (Netherlands) S Visscher	2	6^{2}
4	(Netherlands) J Gimbrère (Netherlands) I Haverlag	6	7^{7}
(Romania) A Prisăcariu (Netherlands) L Stevens	3	5
(Japan) M Ayukawa (Australia) A Parnaby	6	7
(Romania) A Roșca (Bulgaria) I Shinikova	4	6^{5}
2	(Spain) A Bolsova (Spain) G Maristany	6	7^{7}

Quarterfinals
1	(Venezuela) A Gámiz (Netherlands) E Vedder	6	6^{4}	[6]
(Czech Republic) M Bayerlová (Czech Republic) A Laboutková	2	7^{7}	[10]
3	D Astakhova (Latvia) D Vismane	6	1	[4]
(Germany) T Morderger (Germany) Y Morderger	2	6	[10]
(Bosnia and Herzegovina) D Herdželaš (Croatia) T Lukas	2	4
4	(Netherlands) J Gimbrère (Netherlands) I Haverlag	6	6
(Japan) M Ayukawa (Australia) A Parnaby	3	2
2	(Spain) A Bolsova (Spain) G Maristany	6	6

Semifinals
(Czech Republic) M Bayerlová (Czech Republic) A Laboutková	6	6
(Germany) T Morderger (Germany) Y Morderger	4	2
4	(Netherlands) J Gimbrère (Netherlands) I Haverlag	3	4
2	(Spain) A Bolsova (Spain) G Maristany	6	6

Final
(Czech Republic) M Bayerlová (Czech Republic) A Laboutková	2	2
2	(Spain) A Bolsova (Spain) G Maristany	6	6
