= 2014 Orto-Lääkärit Open – Singles =

Singles
- 2014 IPP Open and the Orto-Lääkärit Open

Final
- Champion: (Republic of Ireland) Amy Bowtell
- Runner-up: (Switzerland) Tess Sugnaux
- Score: 6–2, 6–3

Events
Singles	men	women
Doubles	men	women
← 2013 ·	IPP Open	· 2015 →
← 2013 ·	Orto-Lääkärit Open	· 2015 →

Jeļena Ostapenko was the defending champion, but chose not to participate this year.

Amy Bowtell won the title, defeating Tess Sugnaux in the final, 6–2, 6–3.

== Seeds ==
1. (Russia) Eugeniya Pashkova (second round)
2. (Hungary) Vanda Lukács (first round)
3. (Republic of Ireland) Amy Bowtell (champion)
4. (Finland) Emma Laine (second round)
5. (Italy) Corinna Dentoni (semifinals)
6. (Switzerland) Tess Sugnaux (final)
7. (United States) Alexa Guarachi (quarterfinals)
8. (Denmark) Karen Barbat (semifinals)

== Main draw ==
=== Key ===
- Q = Qualifier
- WC = Wild card
- LL = Lucky loser
- Alt = Alternate
- SE = Special exempt
- PR = Protected ranking
- ITF = ITF entry
- JE = Junior exempt
- w/o = Walkover
- r = Retired
- d = Defaulted
- SR = Special ranking

=== Finals ===
Semifinals
8	(Denmark) Karen Barbat	2	6	4
6	(Switzerland) Tess Sugnaux	6	3	6
3	(Republic of Ireland) Amy Bowtell	6^{7}	7^{11}	6
5	(Italy) Corinna Dentoni	7^{9}	6^{9}	1

Final
6	(Switzerland) Tess Sugnaux	2	3
3	(Republic of Ireland) Amy Bowtell	6	6

=== Top half ===
First round
1	(Russia) E Pashkova	6	6
Q	(Sweden) J Cabaj Awad	4	4
(Slovakia) Na Vajdová	2	6	7^{7}
LL	(Belgium) H Scholsen	6	4	6^{4}
(Belgium) B Geukens	5	6^{4}
(Germany) N Pröse	7	7^{7}
(Russia) A Smolina	2	1
8	(Denmark) K Barbat	6	6
4	(Finland) E Laine	6	7
WC	(Finland) N Nylund	1	5
(Russia) A Artamonova	7^{7}	6
Q	(Russia) A Kulikova	6^{5}	4
(Germany) N Niedmers	4	2
(Germany) T Kleinsteuber	6	6
Q	(Slovakia) Š Česneková	6^{3}	4
6	(Switzerland) T Sugnaux	7^{7}	6

Second round
1	(Russia) E Pashkova	4	2
(Slovakia) Na Vajdová	6	6
(Germany) N Pröse	2	3
8	(Denmark) K Barbat	6	6
4	(Finland) E Laine	2	4
(Russia) A Artamonova	6	6
(Germany) T Kleinsteuber	3	0
6	(Switzerland) T Sugnaux	6	6

Quarterfinals
(Slovakia) Na Vajdová	1	2
8	(Denmark) K Barbat	6	6
(Russia) A Artamonova	0	3
6	(Switzerland) T Sugnaux	6	6

Semifinals
8	(Denmark) K Barbat	2	6	4
6	(Switzerland) T Sugnaux	6	3	6

=== Bottom half ===
First round
7	(United States) A Guarachi	6	1
(Russia) A Silich	3	1^{r}
(Latvia) L Gulbe	6	6
WC	(Estonia) V Gorlats	4	2
WC	(Finland) E Leivo	5	2
(Switzerland) M Deagostini	7	6
(Slovakia) Ni Vajdová	3	4
3	(Republic of Ireland) A Bowtell	6	6
5	(Italy) C Dentoni	6	6
Q	(Sweden) R Poikajärvi	2	0
Q	(Russia) A Lysakova	6	6
WC	(Finland) O Pimiä	3	1
Q	(Russia) P Novoselova	6	6
Q	(Finland) R Timonen	3	2
Q	(Russia) A Nefedova	6	6
2	(Hungary) V Lukács	1	2

Second round
7	(United States) A Guarachi	6	6
(Latvia) L Gulbe	4	3
(Switzerland) M Deagostini	2	3
3	(Republic of Ireland) A Bowtell	6	6
5	(Italy) C Dentoni	6	6
Q	(Russia) A Lysakova	1	2
Q	(Russia) P Novoselova	6	6
Q	(Russia) A Nefedova	3	4

Quarterfinals
7	(United States) A Guarachi	3	1
3	(Republic of Ireland) A Bowtell	6	6
5	(Italy) C Dentoni	7	6
Q	(Russia) P Novoselova	5	1

Semifinals
3	(Republic of Ireland) A Bowtell	6^{7}	7^{11}	6
5	(Italy) C Dentoni	7^{9}	6^{9}	1
