= 2021 Amstelveen Women's Open =

Tennis tournament

- Date: 5–11 July 2021
- Edition: 1st
- Category: ITF Women's World Tennis Tour
- Prize money: $60,000
- Surface: Clay
- Location: Amstelveen, Netherlands

Champions

Singles
- (Netherlands) Quirine Lemoine

Doubles
- (Netherlands) Suzan Lamens / (Netherlands) Quirine Lemoine
Amstelveen Women's Open	· 2022 →

The 2021 Amstelveen Women's Open was a professional women's tennis tournament played on outdoor clay courts. It was the first edition of the tournament which was part of the 2021 ITF Women's World Tennis Tour. It took place in Amstelveen, Netherlands between 5 and 11 July 2021.

== Singles main-draw entrants ==
=== Seeds ===
Country	Player	Rank^{1}	Seed
CHN	Wang Xiyu	137	1
AUT	Barbara Haas	156	2
BEL	Maryna Zanevska	192	3
AUT	Julia Grabher	204	4
CRO	Tereza Mrdeža	206	5
ITA	Martina Di Giuseppe	209	6
GEO	Ekaterine Gorgodze	210	7
GRE	Despina Papamichail	227	8

- ^{1} Rankings are as of 28 June 2021.

=== Other entrants ===
The following players received wildcards into the singles main draw:

- (Netherlands) Suzan Lamens
- (United States) Nikki Redelijk
- (Netherlands) Lexie Stevens
- (Netherlands) Eva Vedder

The following player received entry using a junior exempt:

- (United States) Emma Navarro

The following players received entry as special exempts:

- (Netherlands) Quirine Lemoine
- (Turkey) İpek Öz

The following players received entry from the qualifying draw:

- (Italy) Cristiana Ferrando
- (Australia) Jaimee Fourlis
- (Chinese Taipei) Joanna Garland
- (Italy) Verena Meliss
- (Germany) Tayisiya Morderger
- (Germany) Yana Morderger
- (Romania) Andreea Prisăcariu
- (Romania) Ioana Loredana Roșca

== Champions ==
=== Singles ===
- (Netherlands) Quirine Lemoine def. (Germany) Yana Morderger, 7–5, 6–4

=== Doubles ===
- (Netherlands) Suzan Lamens / (Netherlands) Quirine Lemoine def. (Russia) Amina Anshba / (Czech Republic) Anastasia Dețiuc, 6–4, 6–3
