= 2021 Amstelveen Women's Open – Singles =

Singles
- 2021 Amstelveen Women's Open

Final
- Champion: (Netherlands) Quirine Lemoine
- Runner-up: (Germany) Yana Morderger
- Score: 7–5, 6–4

Events
Singles	Doubles
Amstelveen Women's Open	· 2022 →

This was the first edition of the tournament.

Quirine Lemoine won the title, defeating Yana Morderger in the final, 7–5, 6–4.

== Seeds ==
1. (China) Wang Xiyu (second round)
2. (Austria) Barbara Haas (quarterfinals)
3. (Belgium) Maryna Zanevska (second round)
4. (Austria) Julia Grabher (first round)
5. (Croatia) Tereza Mrdeža (second round)
6. (Italy) Martina Di Giuseppe (first round)
7. (Georgia (country)) Ekaterine Gorgodze (first round)
8. (Greece) Despina Papamichail (quarterfinals)

== Draw ==
=== Key ===
- Q = Qualifier
- WC = Wild card
- LL = Lucky loser
- Alt = Alternate
- SE = Special exempt
- PR = Protected ranking
- ITF = ITF entry
- JE = Junior exempt
- w/o = Walkover
- r = Retired
- d = Defaulted
- SR = Special ranking

=== Finals ===
Semifinals
SE	(Netherlands) Quirine Lemoine	6	4	6
(Romania) Alexandra Cadanțu	1	6	3
Q	(Germany) Yana Morderger	4	6	6
Q	(Italy) Cristiana Ferrando	6	1	4

Final
SE	(Netherlands) Quirine Lemoine	7	6
Q	(Germany) Yana Morderger	5	4

=== Top half ===
First round
1	(China) Xiy Wang	6	6
(Switzerland) S Waltert	2	1
SE	(Netherlands) Q Lemoine	5	6	6
(Netherlands) R Hogenkamp	7	2	0
SE	(Turkey) İ Öz	2	7	3
(Greece) V Grammatikopoulou	6	5	6
WC	(Netherlands) S Lamens	7	6
7	(Georgia (country)) E Gorgodze	5	4
3	(Belgium) M Zanevska	7	6
Q	(Chinese Taipei) J Garland	5	1
WC	(Netherlands) L Stevens	3	4
(Romania) A Cadanțu	6	6
(Australia) S Mendez	2	4
Q	(Romania) A Prisăcariu	6	6
(France) C Paquet	6	4	3
8	(Greece) D Papamichail	2	6	6

Second round
1	(China) Xiy Wang	6^{1}	3
SE	(Netherlands) Q Lemoine	7^{7}	6
(Greece) V Grammatikopoulou	6	2	1
WC	(Netherlands) S Lamens	4	6	6
3	(Belgium) M Zanevska	6	1	5
(Romania) A Cadanțu	4	6	7
Q	(Romania) A Prisăcariu	4	4
8	(Greece) D Papamichail	6	6

Quarterfinals
SE	(Netherlands) Q Lemoine	6	7^{7}
WC	(Netherlands) S Lamens	3	6^{5}
(Romania) A Cadanțu	3	6	6
8	(Greece) D Papamichail	6	3	4

Semifinals
SE	(Netherlands) Q Lemoine	6	4	6
(Romania) A Cadanțu	1	6	3

=== Bottom half ===
First round
5	(Croatia) T Mrdeža	6	6
WC	(Netherlands) E Vedder	3	1
WC	(United States) N Redelijk	3	3
Q	(Germany) Y Morderger	6	6
JE	(United States) E Navarro	6	6
(Spain) I Burillo Escorihuela	4	1
(United States) A Parks	6	2	6
4	(Austria) J Grabher	2	6	0
6	(Italy) M Di Giuseppe	3	6	3
Q	(Romania) IL Roșca	6	2	6
Q	(Italy) C Ferrando	7^{7}	6
Q	(Italy) V Meliss	6^{2}	2
Q	(Australia) J Fourlis	4	4
(Croatia) L Bošković	6	6
Q	(Germany) T Morderger	6	5	3
2	(Austria) B Haas	0	7	6

Second round
5	(Croatia) T Mrdeža	1	6	5
Q	(Germany) Y Morderger	6	4	7
JE	(United States) E Navarro	6	4	7
(United States) A Parks	3	6	5
Q	(Romania) IL Roșca	4	3
Q	(Italy) C Ferrando	6	6
(Croatia) L Bošković	5	3
2	(Austria) B Haas	7	6

Quarterfinals
Q	(Germany) Y Morderger	6	7
JE	(United States) E Navarro	3	5
Q	(Italy) C Ferrando	6	5	6
2	(Austria) B Haas	3	7	4

Semifinals
Q	(Germany) Y Morderger	4	6	6
Q	(Italy) C Ferrando	6	1	4
