= Kontinen =

Kontinen (Finnish pronunciation: [ˈkontinen] is a Finnish surname. Notable people with the surname include:

- Henri Kontinen (born 1990), Finnish tennis player
- Micke Kontinen (born 1992), Finnish tennis player, brother of Henri
