= 2022 Amstelveen Women's Open =

Tennis tournament

- Date: 4–10 July 2022
- Edition: 2nd
- Category: ITF Women's World Tennis Tour
- Prize money: $60,000
- Surface: Clay / Outdoor
- Location: Amstelveen, Netherlands

Champions

Singles
- (Switzerland) Simona Waltert

Doubles
- (Spain) Aliona Bolsova / (Spain) Guiomar Maristany
← 2021 ·	Amstelveen Women's Open	· 2023 →

The 2022 Amstelveen Women's Open was a professional tennis tournament played on outdoor clay courts. It was the second edition of the tournament which was part of the 2022 ITF Women's World Tennis Tour. It took place in Amstelveen, Netherlands between 4 and 10 July 2022.

== Champions ==
=== Singles ===
- (Switzerland) Simona Waltert def. (United States) Emma Navarro, 7–6^{(12–10)}, 6–0

=== Doubles ===
- (Spain) Aliona Bolsova / (Spain) Guiomar Maristany def. (Czech Republic) Michaela Bayerlová / (Czech Republic) Aneta Laboutková, 6–2, 6–2

== Singles main draw entrants ==
=== Seeds ===
Country	Player	Rank^{1}	Seed
	Anastasia Tikhonova	167	1
NED	Suzan Lamens	169	2
SUI	Joanne Züger	179	3
SUI	Simona Waltert	186	4
BIH	Dea Herdželaš	197	5
ESP	Aliona Bolsova	206	6
CZE	Sára Bejlek	210	7
BUL	Isabella Shinikova	216	8

- ^{1} Rankings are as of 27 June 2022.

=== Other entrants ===
The following players received wildcards into the singles main draw:

- (Netherlands) Jasmijn Gimbère
- (Netherlands) Merel Hoedt
- (Netherlands) Lexie Stevens
- (Netherlands) Stéphanie Visscher

The following players received entry from the qualifying draw:

- (France) Sara Cakarevic
- (Austria) Barbara Haas
- (Czech Republic) Johana Marková
- (Germany) Tayisiya Morderger
- (United States) Erica Oosterhout
- (Romania) Andreea Prisăcariu
- Diana Shnaider
- (Netherlands) Anouck Vrancken Peeters

The following player received entry as a lucky loser:

- (Israel) Nicole Khirin
