= 2021 Amstelveen Women's Open – Doubles =

Doubles
- 2021 Amstelveen Women's Open

Final
- Champions: (Netherlands) Suzan Lamens (Netherlands) Quirine Lemoine
- Runners-up: (Russia) Amina Anshba (Czech Republic) Anastasia Dețiuc
- Score: 6–4, 6–3

Events
Singles	Doubles
Amstelveen Women's Open	· 2022 →

This was the first edition of the tournament.

Suzan Lamens and Quirine Lemoine won the title, defeating Amina Anshba and Anastasia Dețiuc in the final, 6–4, 6–3.

== Seeds ==
1. (Russia) Amina Anshba / (Czech Republic) Anastasia Dețiuc (final)
2. (Greece) Valentini Grammatikopoulou / (Netherlands) Richèl Hogenkamp (first round)
3. (Germany) Tayisiya Morderger / (Germany) Yana Morderger (semifinals)
4. (Austria) Barbara Haas / (Switzerland) Simona Waltert (withdrew)

== Draw ==
=== Key ===
- Q = Qualifier
- WC = Wild card
- LL = Lucky loser
- Alt = Alternate
- SE = Special exempt
- PR = Protected ranking
- ITF = ITF entry
- JE = Junior exempt
- w/o = Walkover
- r = Retired
- d = Defaulted
- SR = Special ranking

=== Draw ===
First round
1	(Russia) A Anshba (Czech Republic) A Dețiuc	4	6	[10]
(Spain) I Burillo Escorihuela (Greece) D Papamichail	6	2	[6]
WC	(Netherlands) A Koevermans (Netherlands) B Spee	2	3
(Netherlands) L Stevens (China) Xiy Wang	6	6
Alt	(Australia) A Osborne (United States) A Parks	4	2
WC	(Netherlands) E Vedder (Netherlands) S Visscher	6	6
(Romania) A Cadanțu (Netherlands) I Haverlag	6	6
(Romania) O Gavrilă (Cyprus) R Șerban	1	3
WC	(Netherlands) N Liauw a Fong (Netherlands) G Mujan	2	6	[10]
(Australia) S Mendez (United States) K Stewart	6	3	[4]
(Turkey) İ Öz (Romania) A Prisăcariu	2	7	[4]
3	(Germany) T Morderger (Germany) Y Morderger	6	5	[10]
(Latvia) D Marcinkēviča (Latvia) D Vismane	2	1
(Netherlands) S Lamens (Netherlands) Q Lemoine	6	6
(Australia) J Fourlis (Austria) J Grabher	6	6
2	(Greece) V Grammatikopoulou (Netherlands) R Hogenkamp	4	2

Quarterfinals
1	(Russia) A Anshba (Czech Republic) A Dețiuc	w/o
(Netherlands) L Stevens (China) Xiy Wang
WC	(Netherlands) E Vedder (Netherlands) S Visscher	6^{3}	2
(Romania) A Cadanțu (Netherlands) I Haverlag	7^{7}	6
WC	(Netherlands) N Liauw a Fong (Netherlands) G Mujan	3	3
3	(Germany) T Morderger (Germany) Y Morderger	6	6
(Netherlands) S Lamens (Netherlands) Q Lemoine	7	3	[10]
(Australia) J Fourlis (Austria) J Grabher	5	6	[3]

Semifinals
1	(Russia) A Anshba (Czech Republic) A Dețiuc	6	6
(Romania) A Cadanțu (Netherlands) I Haverlag	4	1
3	(Germany) T Morderger (Germany) Y Morderger	1	3
(Netherlands) S Lamens (Netherlands) Q Lemoine	6	6

Final
1	(Russia) A Anshba (Czech Republic) A Dețiuc	4	3
(Netherlands) S Lamens (Netherlands) Q Lemoine	6	6
