= 2014 IPP Open and the Orto-Lääkärit Open =

2014 IPP Open and Orto-Lääkärit Open
- Date: 10–16 November
- Edition: 14th (men); 7th (women)
- Category: ATP Challenger Tour (men); ITF Women's Circuit (women)
- Prize money: €42,500 (men) $10,000 (women)
- Surface: Hard (indoor)
- Location: Helsinki, Finland

Champions

Men's singles
- (Estonia) Jürgen Zopp

Women's singles
- (Republic of Ireland) Amy Bowtell

Men's doubles
- (Finland) Henri Kontinen / (Finland) Jarkko Nieminen

Women's doubles
- (Finland) Emma Laine / (Russia) Eugeniya Pashkova
← 2013 ·	IPP Open	· 2015 →
← 2013 ·	Orto-Lääkärit Open	· 2015 →

The 2014 IPP Open and the Orto-Lääkärit Open were professional tennis tournaments played on indoor hard courts. It was the 14th edition of the men's tournament which was part of the 2014 ATP Challenger Tour, offering a total of €42,500 in prize money, and seventh edition of the women's tournament, which was part of the 2014 ITF Women's Circuit, offering a total of $10,000 in prize money. The two events took place together at the Tali Tennis Center in Helsinki, Finland, on 10–16 November 2014.

== Men's entrants ==
=== Seeds ===
Country	Player	Rank^{1}	Seed
FIN	Jarkko Nieminen	67	1
LTU	Ričardas Berankis	96	2
GER	Tobias Kamke	102	3
BIH	Damir Džumhur	104	4
GER	Peter Gojowczyk	107	5
ISR	Dudi Sela	109	6
TUR	Marsel İlhan	114	7
ROU	Victor Hănescu	127	8

- ^{1} Rankings as of 3 November 2014

=== Other entrants ===
The following players received wildcards into the singles main draw:

- (Switzerland) Henri Laaksonen
- (Finland) Micke Kontinen
- (Finland) Juho Paukku
- (Estonia) Jürgen Zopp

The following players received entry from the qualifying draw:

- (Russia) Philipp Davydenko
- (Moldova) Maxim Dubarenco
- (Sweden) Patrik Rosenholm
- (Sweden) Elias Ymer

The following player received entry into the singles main draw as a lucky loser:

- (Belarus) Egor Gerasimov

== Women's entrants ==
=== Seeds ===
Country	Player	Rank^{1}	Seed
RUS	Eugeniya Pashkova	445	1
HUN	Vanda Lukács	473	2
IRL	Amy Bowtell	482	3
FIN	Emma Laine	537	4
ITA	Corinna Dentoni	552	5
SUI	Tess Sugnaux	555	6
USA	Alexa Guarachi	624	7
DEN	Karen Barbat	647	8

- ^{1} Rankings as of 3 November 2014

=== Other entrants ===
The following players received wildcards into the singles main draw:

- (Estonia) Valeria Gorlats
- (Finland) Ella Leivo
- (Finland) Nanette Nylund
- (Finland) Olivia Pimiä

The following players received entry from the qualifying draw:

- (Sweden) Jacqueline Cabaj Awad
- (Slovakia) Šarlota Česneková
- (Russia) Anastasia Kulikova
- (Russia) Antonina Lysakova
- (Russia) Anastasia Nefedova
- (Russia) Polina Novoselova
- (Sweden) Rebecca Poikajärvi
- (Finland) Roosa Timonen

The following player received entry into the singles main draw as a lucky loser:

- (Belgium) Hélène Scholsen

== Champions ==
=== Men's singles ===
- (Estonia) Jürgen Zopp def. (Israel) Dudi Sela, 6–4, 5–7, 7–6^{(8–6)}

=== Women's singles ===
- (Republic of Ireland) Amy Bowtell def. (Switzerland) Tess Sugnaux, 6–2, 6–3

=== Men's doubles ===
- (Finland) Henri Kontinen / (Finland) Jarkko Nieminen def. (United Kingdom) Jonathan Marray / (Germany) Philipp Petzschner, 7–6^{(7–2)}, 6–4

=== Women's doubles ===
- (Finland) Emma Laine / (Russia) Eugeniya Pashkova def. (Finland) Mia Nicole Eklund / (Finland) Olivia Pimiä, 6–4, 6–0
