= 2013 IPP Open and the Orto-Lääkärit Open =

2013 IPP Open and Orto-Lääkärit Open
- Date: 11–17 November
- Edition: 13th (men); 6th (women)
- Category: ATP Challenger Tour (men); ITF Women's Circuit (women)
- Prize money: €42,500 (men) $10,000 (women)
- Surface: Hard (indoor)
- Location: Helsinki, Finland

Champions

Men's singles
- (Finland) Jarkko Nieminen

Women's singles
- (Latvia) Jeļena Ostapenko

Men's doubles
- (Finland) Henri Kontinen / (Finland) Jarkko Nieminen

Women's doubles
- (Latvia) Jeļena Ostapenko / (Estonia) Eva Paalma
← 2012 ·	IPP Open	· 2014 →
← 2012 ·	Orto-Lääkärit Open	· 2014 →

The 2013 IPP Open and the Orto-Lääkärit Open were professional tennis tournaments played on indoor hard courts. It was the 13th edition of the men's tournament which was part of the 2013 ATP Challenger Tour, offering a total of €42,500 in prize money, and sixth edition of the women's tournament, which was part of the 2013 ITF Women's Circuit, offering a total of $10,000 in prize money. The two events took place together at the Tali Tennis Center in Helsinki, Finland, on 11–17 November 2013.

== Men's singles entrants ==
=== Seeds ===
Country	Player	Rank^{1}	Seed
FIN	Jarkko Nieminen	39	1
POL	Łukasz Kubot	71	2
SVK	Lukáš Lacko	74	3
RUS	Evgeny Donskoy	80	4
GER	Jan-Lennard Struff	99	5
KAZ	Andrey Golubev	100	6
AUT	Andreas Haider-Maurer	112	7
GER	Dustin Brown	126	8

- ^{1} Rankings as of 4 November 2013

=== Other entrants ===
The following players received wildcards into the singles main draw:

- (Russia) Karen Khachanov
- (Finland) Micke Kontinen
- (Finland) Jarkko Nieminen
- (Finland) Herkko Pöllänen

The following players received entry from the qualifying draw:

- (Sweden) Jacob Adaktusson
- (Belarus) Egor Gerasimov
- (Russia) Denis Matsukevich
- (Croatia) Ante Pavić

== Women's singles entrants ==
=== Seeds ===
Country	Player	Rank^{1}	Seed
RUS	~~Alexandra Artamonova~~	487	1
SWE	Susanne Celik	521	2
LAT	Jeļena Ostapenko	672	3
HUN	Vanda Lukács	695	4
FIN	~~Piia Suomalainen~~	756	5
RUS	Anna Smolina	766	6
NED	Quirine Lemoine	779	7
SWE	Anette Munozova	868	8

- ^{1} Rankings as of 4 November 2013

=== Other entrants ===
The following players received wildcards into the singles main draw:

- (Finland) Nanette Nylund
- (Finland) Petra Piirtola
- (Finland) Olivia Pimia
- (Finland) Johanna Ranta-Aho

The following players received entry from the qualifying draw:

- (Russia) Anastasia Artemova
- (United Kingdom) Rona Berisha
- (Estonia) Valeria Gorlats
- (Finland) Elina Joronen
- (Sweden) Fanny Östlund
- (Russia) Yana Parshina
- (Finland) Annika Sillanpää
- (Finland) Roosa Timonen

The following players received entry into the singles main draw as lucky losers:

- (Russia) Milana Gasymova
- (Finland) Kristina Parviainen

== Champions ==
=== Men's singles ===
- (Finland) Jarkko Nieminen def. (Lithuania) Ričardas Berankis 6–3, 6–1

=== Women's singles ===
- (Latvia) Jeļena Ostapenko def. (Sweden) Susanne Celik 7–5, 4–6, 7–5

=== Men's doubles ===
- (Finland) Henri Kontinen / (Finland) Jarkko Nieminen def. (Germany) Dustin Brown / (Germany) Philipp Marx 7–5, 5–7, [10–5]

=== Women's doubles ===
- (Latvia) Jeļena Ostapenko / (Estonia) Eva Paalma def. (Netherlands) Quirine Lemoine / (Czech Republic) Martina Přádová 6–2, 5–7, [11–9]
