= Juho Paukku =

Finnish tennis player

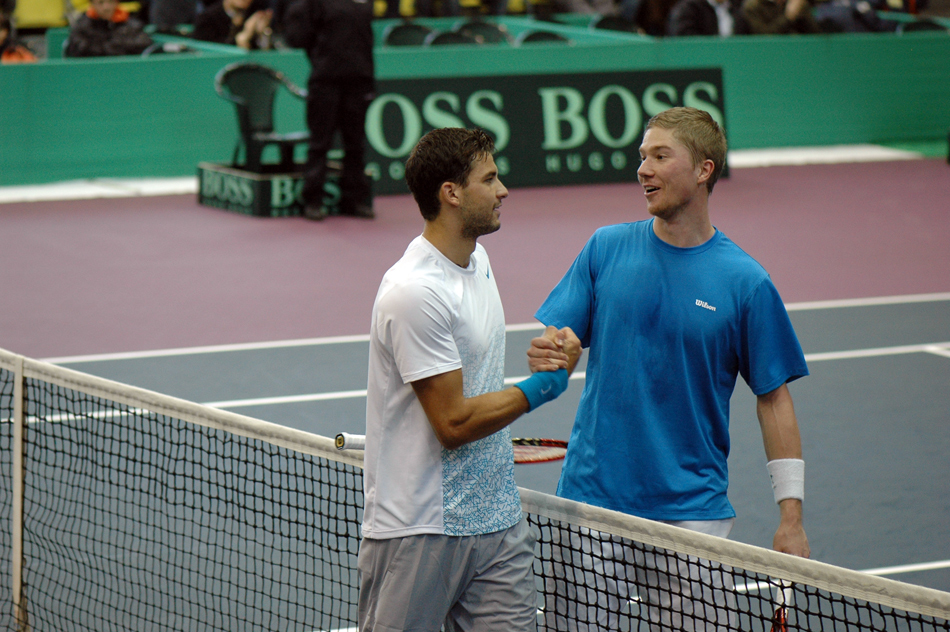
- Juho Paukku (right) after his defeat against Grigor Dimitrov during the 2013 Davis Cup
- Country (sports): Finland
- Residence: Helsinki, Finland
- Born: 19 July 1986 (age 39) Helsinki, Finland
- Height: 1.87 m (6 ft 2 in)
- Plays: Left-handed (double-handed backhand)
- Prize money: $85,140

Singles
- Career record: 1–7
- Highest ranking: No. 379 (17 January 2011)

Doubles
- Career record: 1–2
- Highest ranking: No. 250 (7 February 2011)

Juho Paukku (born 19 July 1986) is a professional Finnish tennis player.

Paukku reached his highest individual ranking on the ATP Tour on 17 January 2011, when he became world No. 379. He primarily plays on the Futures circuit and the Challenger circuit.

Paukku has been a member of the Finland Davis Cup team since 2004, posting a 2–8 record in singles and an 0–2 record in doubles in 8 ties.

== Career titles ==
Legend (singles)
Grand Slam (0)
Tennis Masters Cup (0)
ATP Masters Series (0)
ATP Tour (0)
Challengers (0)
Futures (5)

No.	Date	Tournament	Surface	Opponent in the final	Score
1.	2007	Vierumäki	Clay	(Finland) Timo Nieminen	6–0, 6–2
2.	2007	Gothenburg	Hard (i)	(Sweden) Robin Brage	7–5, 6–4
3.	2009	Isernhagen	Hard (i)	(Germany) Jaan-Frederik Brunken	6–4, 6–2
4.	2010	Vierumäki	Clay	(Finland) Micke Kontinen	6–2, 7–5
5.	2010	Kos	Hard	(Latvia) Adrians Žguns	6–3, 6–2

== See also ==
- List of Finland Davis Cup team representatives
