= Suzan Lamens =

Dutch tennis player (born 1999)

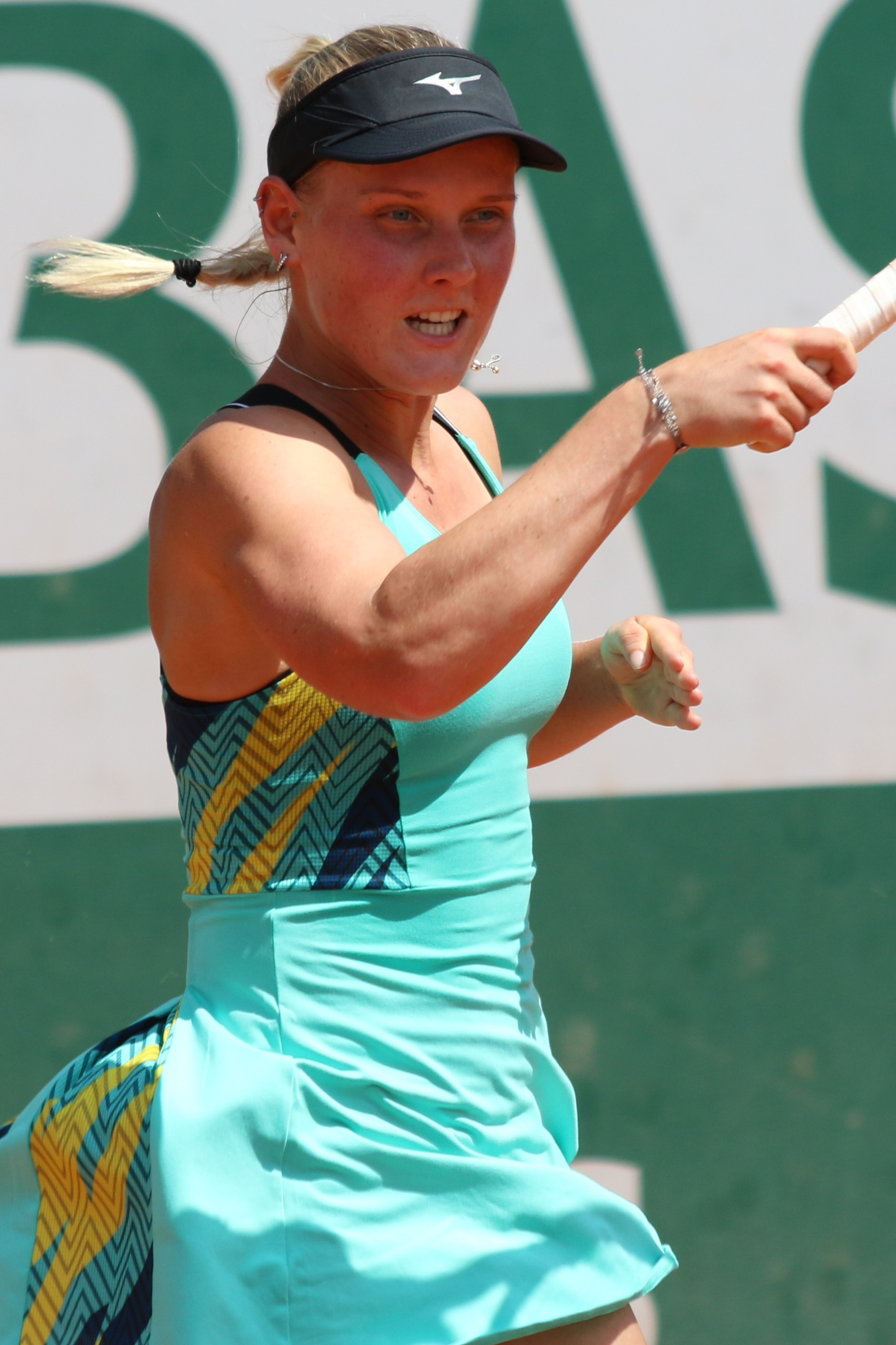
- Lamens at the 2022 French Open
- Country (sports): Netherlands
- Born: 5 July 1999 (age 27)
- Height: 1.68 m (5 ft 6 in)
- Plays: Right (two-handed backhand)
- Prize money: $1,632,142

Singles
- Career record: 317–252
- Career titles: 1 WTA, 1 WTA Challenger
- Highest ranking: No. 57 (22 September 2025)
- Current ranking: No. 164 (24 August 2026)

Grand Slam singles results
- Australian Open: 2R (2025)
- French Open: 1R (2025)
- Wimbledon: 2R (2025)
- US Open: 2R (2025)

Doubles
- Career record: 199–118
- Career titles: 16 ITF
- Highest ranking: No. 183 (22 May 2023)
- Current ranking: No. 1479 (24 August 2026)

Grand Slam doubles results
- Australian Open: 1R (2025, 2026)
- French Open: 1R (2025)
- Wimbledon: 1R (2025)
- Last updated on: 29 August 2026.

Suzan Lamens (born 5 July 1999) is a Dutch professional tennis player. She has a best singles ranking of No. 57 by the WTA, achieved on 22 September 2025. Lamens is the current No. 1 Dutch singles player. She has won one singles title on the WTA Tour and one WTA 125 singles title.

== Career ==
=== 2021–2022: WTA Tour debut ===
Lamens won her first 60k title at the 2021 Amstelveen Open, in the doubles draw, partnering Quirine Lemoine.

She made her WTA Tour debut at the 2022 Copa Colsanitas, defeating seventh seed Astra Sharma to reach the second round, where she lost to Irina Bara in three sets.

=== 2024: WTA Tour title, top 100 ===
In April, she defeated Jeļena Ostapenko in the BJK Group I for her first top 10 win, outside the WTA Tour. Following her maiden WTA 125 title at the Oeiras Ladies Open, which she won as an unseeded player, she made her top 150 debut at No. 134, on 22 April 2024.

Ranked No. 140, she received a wildcard for the Rosmalen Open and defeated Bernarda Pera, before losing to Naomi Osaka in the second round.

Lamens reached her first WTA Tour quarterfinal at the Budapest Grand Prix by defeating eighth seed Varvara Gracheva, and Carole Monnet, before losing to Aliaksandra Sasnovich.

At the Japan Women's Open in Osaka, she qualified for the main-draw and defeated sixth seed Viktoriya Tomova for her second career top 50 win on the WTA Tour. She defeated Lucia Bronzetti to reach the quarterfinals and made her first WTA semifinal with a win over qualifier Ana Bogdan. After overcoming seventh seed Diane Parry in the last four, her third consecutive top-100 win, Lamens defeated fellow qualifier Kimberly Birrell in straight sets to claim her first WTA Tour title. As a result, she reached the top 100 in the rankings, on 21 October 2024.

=== 2025: Major debut, WTA 1000 third round ===
Lamens made her major main-draw debut at the Australian Open, defeating qualifier Veronika Erjavec in the first round, before losing to Belinda Bencic in the second. She made her WTA 1000 debut at the Dubai Open, after qualifying for the main-draw but lost to Karolína Muchová in the first round. At the Indian Wells Open, she recorded her first WTA 1000 win over Marie Bouzková, before losing to second seed Elena Rybakina in the second round.

In April, she overcame wildcard entrant Bianca Andreescu, second seed Linda Nosková and qualifier Tiantsoa Rakotomanga Rajaonah to reach the semifinals at the Rouen Open, before losing to third seed Olga Danilović.

On the grass courts at the Rosmalen Open in June, Lamens defeated qualifier Yanina Wickmayer and Ann Li to make it through to the quarterfinals, before her run was ended by Elisabetta Cocciaretto.

At the Canadian Open, she reached the third round of a WTA 1000 event for the first time, defeating Polina Kudermetova and world No. 21, Beatriz Haddad Maia, but lost to Zhu Lin. Lamens recorded a new career-high singles ranking of world No. 57, on 22 September 2025.

In September, Lamens defeated Tatjana Maria and fifth seed Diana Shnaider to make it into her first WTA 500 quarterfinal at the Korea Open, at which point she lost to qualifier Kateřina Siniaková.

== Performance timeline ==
Key
W	F	SF	QF	#R	RR	Q#	DNQ	A	NH

(W) winner; (F) finalist; (SF) semifinalist; (QF) quarterfinalist; (#R) rounds 4, 3, 2, 1; (RR) round-robin stage; (Q#) qualification round; (DNQ) did not qualify; (A) absent; (NH) not held; (SR) strike rate (events won / competed); (W–L) win–loss record.
To avoid confusion and double counting, these charts are updated at the conclusion of a tournament or when the player's participation has ended.

Only main-draw results in WTA Tour, Grand Slam tournaments, Billie Jean King Cup and Olympic Games are included in win–loss records.

=== Singles ===
Tournament	2022	2023	2024	2025	2026	W–L
Grand Slam tournaments
Australian Open	A	Q1	Q1	2R	1R	1–2
French Open	Q2	A	Q2	1R	Q3	0–1
Wimbledon	Q1	A	Q1	2R	Q2	1–1
US Open	Q1	A	Q1	2R	Q2	1–1
Win–loss	0–0	0–0	0–0	3–4	0–1	3–5
WTA 1000 tournaments
Dubai				1R	A	0–1
Indian Wells				2R	Q1	1–1
Miami Open				1R	Q1	0–1
Madrid Open				1R	Q1	0–1
Rome Open				2R	Q1	1–1
Canadian Open				3R	A	2–1
Cincinnati Open	A	A	A	1R	A	0–1
China Open	NH	A	Q1	1R		0–1
Wuhan Open	NH	NH	Q2	Q1		0–0
Win–loss	0–0	0–0	0–0	4–8	0–0	4–8

== WTA Tour finals ==
=== Singles: 1 (title) ===
Legend WTA 500 WTA 250 (1–0)	Finals by surface Hard (1–0) Clay (0–0)

Result	W–L	Date	Tournament	Tier	Surface	Opponent	Score
Win	1–0	Oct 2024	Japan Women's Open	WTA 250	Hard	(Australia) Kimberly Birrell	6–0, 6–4

== WTA 125 finals ==
=== Singles: 1 (title) ===
Result	W–L	Date	Tournament	Surface	Opponent	Score
Win	1–0	Apr 2024	Oeiras Ladies Open, Portugal	Clay	(Denmark) Clara Tauson	6–4, 5–7, 6–4

== ITF Circuit finals ==
=== Singles: 13 (7 titles, 6 runner-ups) ===
Legend
W75 tournaments (2–0)
W25 tournaments (3–3)
W10/15 tournaments (2–3)

Result	W–L	Date	Tournament	Tier	Surface	Opponent	Score
Loss	0–1	Sep 2016	ITF Alphen a/d Rijn, Netherlands	W10	Clay	(Netherlands) Chayenne Ewijk	5–7, 5–7
Win	1–1	Jun 2019	ITF Alkmaar, Netherlands	W15	Clay	(Sweden) Marina Yudanov	7–5, 6–2
Win	2–1	Jul 2019	ITF Parnu, Estonia	W15	Clay	(Estonia) Elena Malõgina	6–4, 6–0
Loss	2–2	Feb 2021	ITF Manacor, Spain	W15	Hard	(Russia) Oksana Selekhmeteva	3–6, 2–6
Loss	2–3	Mar 2021	ITF Monastir, Tunisia	W15	Hard	(Finland) Anastasia Kulikova	4–6, 6–2, 3–6
Win	3–3	Jul 2021	Telavi Open, Georgia	W25	Clay	(Switzerland) Joanne Züger	7–5, 6–2
Loss	3–4	Sep 2021	ITF Pretoria, South Africa	W25	Hard	(South Africa) Zoë Kruger	6–3, 4–6, 4–6
Loss	3–5	Mar 2022	ITF Salinas, Ecuador	W25	Hard	(Chile) Bárbara Gatica	4–6, 6–7^{(2)}
Win	4–5	Mar 2022	Open Medellín, Colombia	W25	Clay	(Switzerland) Ylena In-Albon	6–4, 6–2
Loss	4–6	Apr 2023	ITF Sopo, Colombia	W25	Clay	(France) Séléna Janicijevic	4–6, 7–5, 4–6
Win	5–6	Aug 2023	ITF Malmö, Sweden	W25	Clay	(Turkey) Ayla Aksu	6–1, 6–4
Win	6–6	Mar 2024	Trnava Indoor, Slovakia	W75	Hard (i)	(Switzerland) Céline Naef	6–2, 6–2
Win	7–6	Oct 2026	GB Pro-Series Glasgow, United Kingdom	W75	Hard (i)	(United States) Fiona Crawley	6–4, 6–3

=== Doubles: 30 (16 titles, 14 runner-ups) ===
Legend
W100 tournaments (0–1)
W60 tournaments (1–2)
W40 tournaments (0–1)
W25 tournaments (4–4)
W10/15 tournaments (11–6)

Result	W–L	Date	Tournament	Tier	Surface	Partner	Opponents	Score
Win	1–0	Sep 2016	ITF Alphen a/d Rijn, Netherlands	W10	Clay	(Netherlands) Nina Kruijer	(Netherlands) Chayenne Ewijk (Netherlands) Rosalie van der Hoek	6–0, 3–6, [10–5]
Win	2–0	Oct 2016	ITF Heraklion, Greece	W10	Clay	(Netherlands) Nina Kruijer	(Austria) Mira Antonitsch (Netherlands) Phillis Vanenburg	6–4, 4–6, [12–10]
Win	3–0	Nov 2016	ITF Heraklion, Greece	W10	Clay	(Netherlands) Nina Kruijer	(Belgium) Steffi Distelmans (Israel) Vlada Katic	6–2, 4–6, [10–8]
Loss	3–1	Sep 2017	ITF Antalya, Turkey	W15	Clay	(Netherlands) Erika Vogelsang	(Paraguay) Lara Escauriza (Chile) Bárbara Gatica	5–7, 4–6
Win	4–1	Oct 2017	ITF Sharm El Sheikh, Egypt	W15	Hard	(Netherlands) Nina Kruijer	(Serbia) Barbara Bonić (Slovenia) Nastja Kolar	3–6, 7–5, [10–8]
Loss	4–2	Mar 2018	ITF Gonesse, France	W15	Clay	(Belgium) Luna Meers	(Belgium) Lara Salden (France) Camille Sireix	6–7^{(5)}, 6–2, [9–11]
Loss	4–3	May 2018	ITF Antalya, Turkey	W15	Clay	(Romania) Arina Vasilescu	(Japan) Haruna Arakawa (Czech Republic) Magdaléna Pantůčková	5–7, 6–7^{(3)}
Win	5–3	Aug 2018	ITF Rotterdam, Netherlands	W15	Clay	(Belarus) Sviatlana Pirazhenka	(Netherlands) Dewi Dijkman (Netherlands) Isabelle Haverlag	6–3, 4–6, [10–5]
Win	6–3	Sep 2018	ITF Haren, Netherlands	W15	Clay	(Netherlands) Arianne Hartono	(Japan) Yukina Saigo (Netherlands) Dominique Karregat	6–1, 6–7^{(1)}, [10–4]
Loss	6–4	Nov 2018	ITF Nonthaburi, Thailand	W15	Clay	(Switzerland) Nina Stadler	(Thailand) Chompoothip Jundakate (Thailand) Tamachan Momkoonthod	3–6, 4–6
Win	7–4	Jun 2019	ITF Montemor-o-Novo, Portugal	W15	Clay	(Russia) Anna Pribylova	(Portugal) Maria Inês Fonte (Portugal) Francisca Jorge	6–2, 2–6, [10–7]
Loss	7–5	Jul 2019	ITF Sandelfjord, Norway	W15	Clay	(Netherlands) Annick Melgers	(Norway) Astrid Brune Olsen (Norway) Malene Helgø	3–6, 3–6
Loss	7–6	Aug 2019	ITF Koksijde, Belgium	W25	Clay	(Russia) Anna Pribylova	(Belgium) Lara Salden (Belgium) Kimberley Zimmermann	1–6, 7–6^{(3)}, [9–11]
Win	8–6	Sep 2019	ITF Prague Open, Czech Republic	W25	Clay	(Russia) Marina Melnikova	(Poland) Katarzyna Piter (Ukraine) Anastasiya Shoshyna	6–2, 5–7, [10–8]
Win	9–6	Nov 2019	ITF Pärnu, Estonia	W15	Hard (i)	(Russia) Anastasia Pribylova	(Lithuania) Iveta Daujotaitė (Latvia) Patrīcija Špaka	6–1, 6–2
Loss	9–7	Nov 2019	ITF Minsk, Belarus	W25	Clay	(Russia) Anastasia Pribylova	(Russia) Victoria Kan (Russia) Anna Morgina	6–7^{(3)}, 6–7^{(4)}
Win	10–7	Feb 2020	ITF Manacor, Spain	W15	Hard	(Switzerland) Nina Stadler	(Russia) Maria Marfutina (Italy) Camilla Rosatello	4–6, 6–1, [10–6]
Win	11–7	Aug 2020	ITF Alkmaar, Netherlands	W15	Hard	(France) Marine Partaud	(Netherlands) Eva Vedder (Netherlands) Stéphanie Visscher	7–5, 7–6^{(3)}
Win	12–7	Nov 2020	ITF Ortisei, Italy	W15	Hard (i)	(Belgium) Kimberley Zimmermann	(Italy) Federica di Sarra (Finland) Anastasia Kulikova	3–6, 6–4, [11–9]
Loss	12–8	Nov 2020	ITF Las Palmas, Spain	W25	Clay	(Netherlands) Eva Vedder	(Belgium) Lara Salden (Belgium) Kimberley Zimmermann	1–6, 3–6
Loss	12–9	Mar 2021	ITF Monastir, Tunisia	W15	Hard	(Sweden) Jacqueline Cabaj Awad	(Netherlands) Merel Hoedt (Belgium) Eliessa Vanlangendonck	2–6, 6–2, [5–10]
Win	13–9	Apr 2021	ITF Oeiras, Portugal	W25	Clay	(Russia) Marina Melnikova	(Russia) Natela Dzalamidze (Russia) Sofya Lansere	6–3, 6–1
Win	14–9	Jul 2021	Amstelveen Open, Netherlands	W60	Clay	(Netherlands) Quirine Lemoine	(Russia) Amina Anshba (Czech Republic) Anastasia Dețiuc	6–4, 6–3
Loss	14–10	Sep 2022	ITF Santarém, Portugal	W25	Hard	(Russia) Anastasia Tikhonova	(Japan) Mai Hontama (Australia) Maddison Inglis	0–6, 4–6
Loss	14–11	Oct 2022	Monastir Open, Tunisia	W60	Hard	(Netherlands) Isabelle Haverlag	(Indonesia) Priska Madelyn Nugroho (China) Wei Sijia	3–6, 2–6
Win	15–11	Nov 2022	ITF Haabneeme, Estonia	W25	Hard (i)	(Norway) Malene Helgø	(Slovenia) Dalila Jakupović (Netherlands) Arantxa Rus	6–2, 6–1
Loss	15–12	Feb 2023	ITF Mexico City	W40	Hard	(Latvia) Darja Semeņistaja	(United States) Sofia Sewing (Turkey) Berfu Cengiz	1–6, 6–1, [10–12]
Loss	15–13	Apr 2023	Koper Open, Slovenia	W60	Clay	(Australia) Kaylah McPhee	(Romania) Irina Bara (Romania) Andreea Mitu	2–6, 3–6
Loss	15–14	May 2023	Empire Slovak Open, Slovakia	W100	Clay	(France) Estelle Cascino	(Russia) Amina Anshba (Czech Republic) Anastasia Dețiuc	3–6, 6–4, [4–10]
Win	16–14	Aug 2023	ITF Malmö, Sweden	W25	Clay	(Netherlands) Lexie Stevens	(Sweden) Jacqueline Cabaj Awad (Sweden) Lisa Zaar	6–4, 6–1

== Top 10 wins ==
#	Opponent	Rank	Event	Surface	Round	Score	SLR
2024
1.	(Latvia) Jeļena Ostapenko	10	2024 BJK Cup, Portugal	Clay	G1 RR	7–6^{(9–7)}, 6–4	164

== Best Grand Slam results details ==
=== Singles ===
Australian Open
2025 Australian Open
Round	Opponent	Rank	Score	SLR
1R	(Slovenia) Veronika Erjavec (Q)	No. 171	7–5, 7–6^{(8–6)}	No. 77
2R	(Switzerland) Belinda Bencic (PR)	No. 294	1–6, 6–7^{(3–7)}	No. 77

Wimbledon Championships
2025 Wimbledon
Round	Opponent	Rank	Score	SLR
1R	(United States) Iva Jovic (Q)	No. 89	6–1, 6–1	No. 69
2R	Ekaterina Alexandrova (18)	No. 17	4–6, 0–6	No. 69

French Open
2025 French Open
Round	Opponent	Rank	Score	SLR
1R	(United States) Ashlyn Krueger	No. 35	3–6, 4–6	No. 69

US Open
2025 US Open
Round	Opponent	Rank	Score	SLR
1R	(United States) Valerie Glozman (WC)	No. 902	6–4, 6–2	No. 66
2R	(Poland) Iga Świątek (2)	No. 2	1–6, 6–4, 4–6	No. 66
