= Mia Eklund =

Finnish tennis player

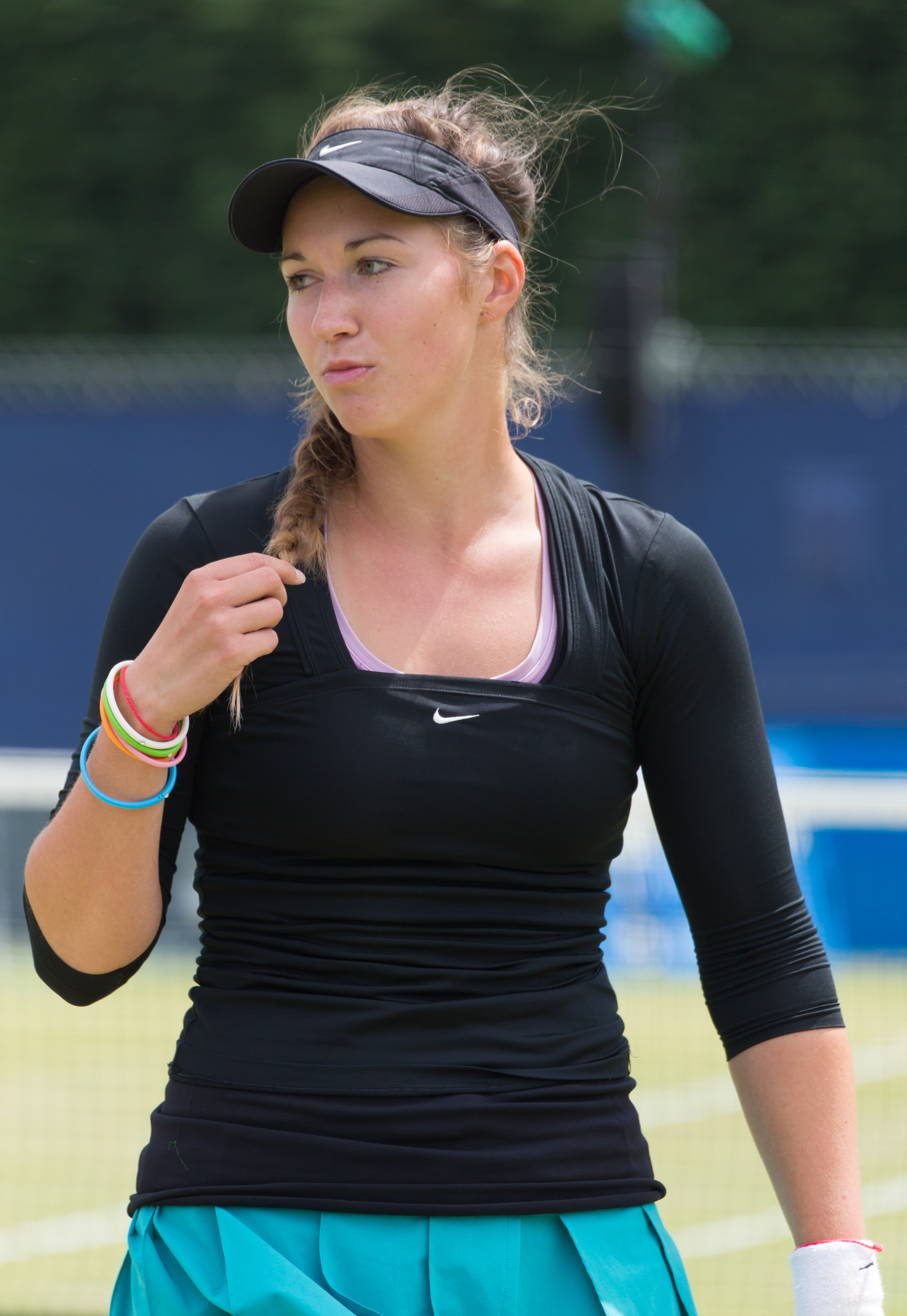
- Eklund in London, 2015
- Full name: Mia Nicole Eklund
- Country (sports): Finland
- Born: 30 October 1994 (age 30); Tallinn, Estonia
- Height: 1.76 m (5 ft 9 in)
- Retired: 2019
- Plays: Left (two-handed backhand)
- Prize money: $36,048

Singles
- Career record: 131–149
- Career titles: 1 ITF
- Highest ranking: No. 534 (25 June 2018)

Doubles
- Career record: 89–90
- Career titles: 4 ITF
- Highest ranking: No. 419 (21 May 2018)

Mia Nicole Eklund (born 30 October 1994) is a retired Finnish tennis player.

On 25 June 2018, she reached her best singles ranking of world No. 534. On 21 May 2018, she peaked at No. 419 in the doubles rankings. In her career, Eklund won one singles title and four doubles titles on the ITF Women's Circuit.

In December 2017, she was awarded "Female Tennis Player of the Year" in Finland.

Playing for Finland in the Fed Cup, Eklund has accumulated a win–loss record of 7–6 in singles and 6–2 in doubles (overall 13–8).

== ITF finals ==
=== Singles (1–1) ===
Legend
$100,000 tournaments
$80,000 tournaments
$60,000 tournaments
$25,000 tournaments
$15,000 tournaments

Result	No.	Date	Tournament	Surface	Opponent	Score
Loss	1.	22 October 2017	ITF Hammamet, Tunisia	Clay	(Italy) Michele Alexandra Zmău	6–4, 3–6, 6–7^{(4)}
Win	1.	5 November 2017	ITF Hammamet, Tunisia	Clay	(France) Yasmine Mansouri	7–6^{(1)}, 6–4

=== Doubles (4–7) ===
Legend $25,000 tournaments $15,000 tournaments $10,000 tournaments	Finals by surface Hard (1–3) Clay (3–3) Carpet (0–1)

Result	No.	Date	Tournament	Surface	Partner	Opponents	Score
Loss	1.	14 November 2014	ITF Helsinki, Finland	Hard (i)	(Finland) Olivia Pimiä	(Finland) Emma Laine (Russia) Eugeniya Pashkova	4–6, 0–6
Loss	2.	23 July 2016	ITF Tampere, Finland	Clay	(Germany) Katharina Hering	(Finland) Emma Laine (Germany) Julia Wachaczyk	2–6, 3–6
Loss	3.	5 November 2016	ITF Sheffield, UK	Hard (i)	(Belarus) Nika Shytkouskaya	(United Kingdom) Sarah Beth Grey (United Kingdom) Olivia Nicholls	6–7^{(3)}, 5–7
Loss	4.	20 July 2017	ITF Don Benito, Spain	Carpet	(United Kingdom) Gabriella Taylor	(Italy) Maria Masini (Spain) Olga Parres Azcoitia	3–6, 3–6
Win	1.	23 September 2017	ITF Hammamet, Tunisia	Clay	(United States) Amy Zhu	(Russia) Vasilisa Aponasenko (Italy) Beatrice Lombardo	6–1, 6–4
Loss	5.	30 September 2017	ITF Hammamet, Tunisia	Clay	(United States) Amy Zhu	(Italy) Angelica Moratelli (Italy) Natasha Piludu	4–6, 2–6
Win	2.	22 October 2017	ITF Hammamet, Tunisia	Clay	(Germany) Julyette Steur	(France) Loudmilla Bencheikh (France) Yasmine Mansouri	6–4, 4–6, [10–7]
Win	3.	9 December 2017	ITF Antalya, Turkey	Clay	(Romania) Cristina Dinu	(Bulgaria) Dia Evtimova (Argentina) Paula Ormaechea	6–3, 6–2
Loss	6.	24 March 2018	ITF Heraklion, Greece	Clay	(United Kingdom) Emily Appleton	(Denmark) Emilie Francati (Denmark) Maria Jespersen	5–7, 6–4, [8–10]
Win	4.	10 November 2018	ITF Monastir, Tunisia	Hard	(Serbia) Bojana Marinković	(Serbia) Tamara Čurović (Belgium) Eliessa Vanlangendonck	6–1, 7–6^{(6)}
Loss	7.	18 November 2018	ITF Monastir, Tunisia	Hard	(Sweden) Linnea Malmqvist	(Serbia) Tamara Čurović (Netherlands) Dominique Karregat	6–7^{(6)}, 1–6
