= Quirine Lemoine =

Dutch tennis player (born 1991)

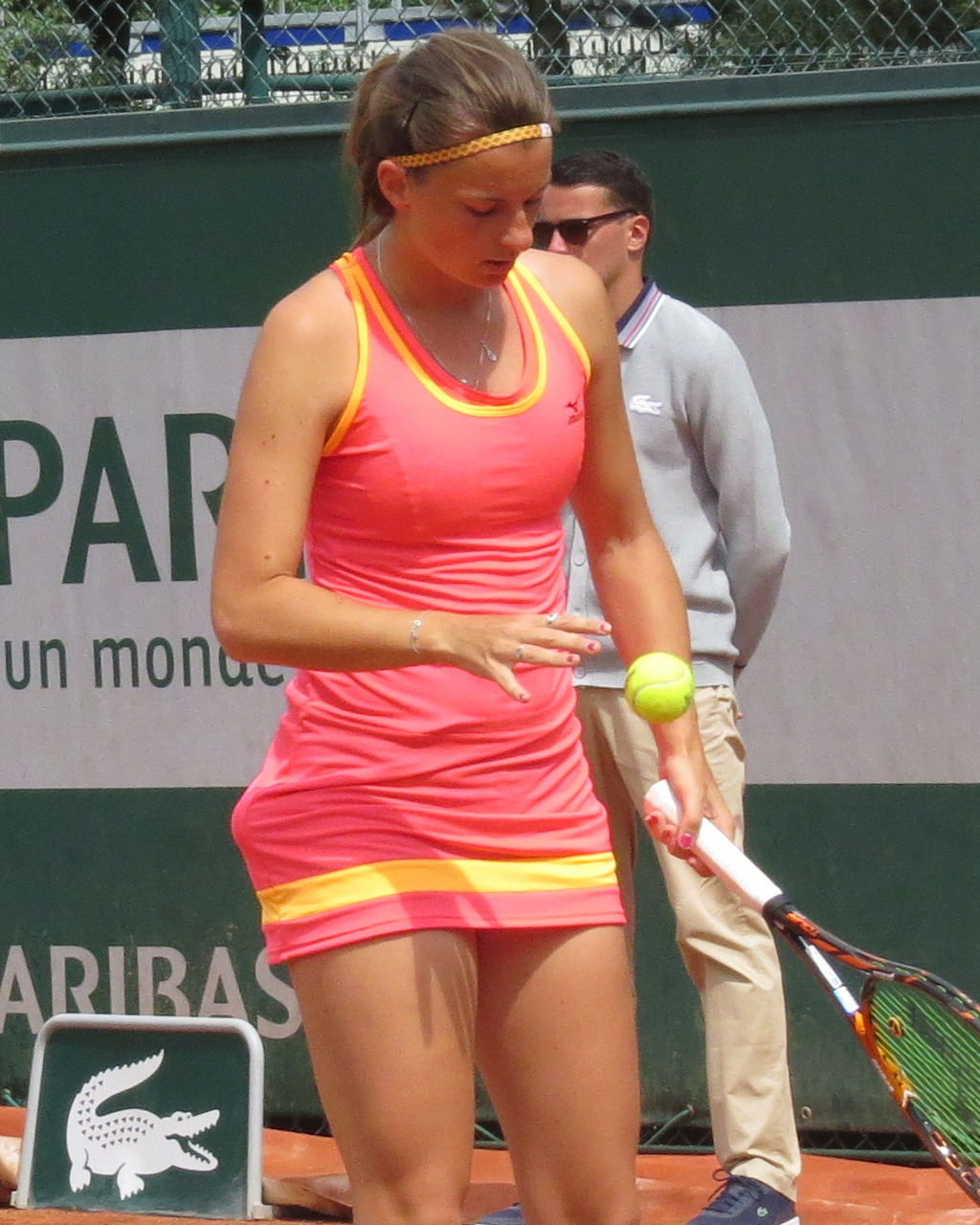
- Lemoine at the 2017 Roland Garros qualifying
- Country (sports): Netherlands
- Born: 25 December 1991 (age 34) Woerden, Netherlands
- Turned pro: 2008
- Retired: 2022
- Plays: Left (two-handed backhand)
- Prize money: $274,675

Singles
- Career record: 297–180
- Career titles: 19 ITF
- Highest ranking: No. 137 (3 July 2017)

Grand Slam singles results
- Australian Open: Q1 (2017, 2019)
- French Open: 1R (2017)
- Wimbledon: Q1 (2017)
- US Open: Q2 (2019)

Doubles
- Career record: 192–82
- Career titles: 1 WTA, 27 ITF
- Highest ranking: No. 116 (14 August 2017)

Quirine Lemoine (born 25 December 1991) is a Dutch former professional tennis player. Over her career, she won 19 singles titles and 27 doubles titles on the ITF Women's Circuit. On 3 July 2017, she reached her best singles ranking of world No. 137. On 14 August 2017, she peaked at No. 116 in the WTA doubles rankings.

Lemoine made her WTA Tour debut at the 2015 Brasil Tennis Cup, defeating Gaia Sanesi in the singles qualifying. She also made her WTA Tour main-draw debut in doubles there, partnering Susanne Celik. She won her sole WTA Tour title at the 2017 Swedish Open held in Båstad, partnering Arantxa Rus. In the on-court television interview after the win she said that the success was even more special because the two had been friends since they were ten years old.

In July 2022, Lemoine announced her retirement with the $60k Amstelveen Open tournament playing in her home country.

Playing for the Netherlands Fed Cup team, she has a win-loss record of 0–2.

== Grand Slam performance timeline ==
=== Singles ===
Tournament	2017	2018	2019	W–L
Australian Open	Q1	A	Q1	0–0
French Open	1R	Q1	A	0–1
Wimbledon	Q1	A	A	0–0
US Open	Q1	A	Q2	0–0
Win–loss	0–1	0–0	0–0	0–1

== WTA Tour finals ==
=== Doubles: 1 (title) ===
Legend
WTA 250 (1–0)

Result	Date	Tournament	Tier	Surface	Partner	Opponents	Score
Win	Jul 2017	Swedish Open	International (Note: The WTA International tournaments were reclassified as WTA 250 tournaments in 2021.)	Clay	(Netherlands) Arantxa Rus	(Argentina) María Irigoyen (Czech Republic) Barbora Krejčíková	3–6, 6–3, [10–8]

== ITF Circuit finals ==
=== Singles: 25 (19 titles, 6 runner-ups) ===
Legend $60,000 tournaments $25,000 tournaments $10/15,000 tournaments	Finals by surface Hard (5–3) Clay (12–2) Carpet (2–1)

Result	W–L	Date	Tournament	Tier	Surface	Opponent	Score
Win	1–0	Apr 2011	ITF Antalya, Turkey	10,000	Hard	(Bulgaria) Isabella Shinikova	6–4, 6–2
Loss	1–1	Oct 2011	ITF Stockholm, Sweden	10,000	Hard (i)	(Germany) Antonia Lottner	6–4, 4–6, 5–7
Win	2–1	Feb 2012	ITF Helsingborg, Sweden	10,000	Carpet (i)	(Czech Republic) Eva Hrdinová	6–4, 6–4
Win	3–1	Apr 2012	ITF Edinburgh, United Kingdom	10,000	Clay	(France) Elixane Lechemia	6–1, 6–0
Win	4–1	May 2012	ITF Istanbul, Turkey	10,000	Clay	(Armenia) Ani Amiraghyan	6–2, 7–6^{(5)}
Win	5–1	Apr 2014	ITF Manama, Bahrain	10,000	Hard	(Oman) Fatma Al-Nabhani	4–6, 6–1, 6–2
Win	6–1	Jun 2014	ITF Amstelveen, Netherlands	10,000	Clay	(United States) Bernarda Pera	2–6, 6–4, 6–2
Win	7–1	Jul 2014	ITF Knokke, Belgium	10,000	Hard	(Netherlands) Kelly Versteeg	6–1, 6–0
Win	8–1	Jul 2014	ITF Maaseik, Belgium	10,000	Clay	(Netherlands) Bernice van de Velde	6–1, 6–3
Win	9–1	Aug 2014	ITF Rotterdam, Netherlands	10,000	Clay	(Spain) Olga Sáez Larra	6–3, 3–6, 6–2
Win	10–1	Jul 2015	ITF Zeeland, Netherlands	15,000	Hard	(Netherlands) Arantxa Rus	6–1, 6–2
Win	11–1	Jun 2016	ITF Nieuwpoort, Belgium	10,000	Clay	(France) Margot Yerolymos	6–4, 6–3
Win	12–1	Jul 2016	ITF Middelburg, Netherlands	25,000	Clay	(Greece) Valentini Grammatikopoulou	6–2, 7–5
Win	13–1	Sep 2016	Royal Cup, Montenegro	25,000	Clay	(Argentina) Paula Ormaechea	7–5, 6–1
Win	14–1	Nov 2016	ITF Zawada, Poland	25,000	Carpet (i)	(Germany) Laura Schaeder	3–6, 6–4, 7–5
Loss	14–2	Nov 2016	Open de Valencia, Spain	25,000	Clay	(Italy) Jasmine Paolini	1–6, 6–2, 4–6
Loss	14–3	Feb 2017	AK Ladies Open, Germany	25,000	Carpet (i)	(Netherlands) Bibiane Schoofs	5–7, 5–7
Win	15–3	Jun 2017	ITF Ystad, Sweden	25,000	Clay	(Norway) Melanie Stokke	1–6, 6–4, 6–3
Loss	15–4	May 2018	Open Saint Gaudens, France	60,000	Clay	(Belarus) Vera Lapko	2–6, 4–6
Loss	15–5	Oct 2018	Challenger de Saguenay, Canada	60,000	Hard (i)	(Canada) Katherine Sebov	6–7^{(10)}, 6–7^{(4)}
Win	16–5	Nov 2018	Toronto Challenger, Canada	60,000	Hard (i)	(Ukraine) Kateryna Kozlova	6–2, 6–3
Loss	16–6	Jan 2020	ITF Liepāja, Latvia	W15	Hard (i)	(Latvia) Elza Tomase	6–0, 3–6, 1–6
Win	17–6	Jun 2021	ITF Alkmaar, Netherlands	W15	Clay	(Russia) Julia Avdeeva	7–6^{(6)}, 6–1
Win	18–6	Jun 2021	ITF The Hague, Netherlands	W25	Clay	(Hungary) Panna Udvardy	7–5, 6–3
Win	19–6	Jul 2021	Amstelveen Open, Netherlands	W60	Clay	(Germany) Yana Morderger	7–5, 6–4

=== Doubles: 38 (27 titles, 11 runner-ups) ===
Result	W–L	Date	Tournament	Tier	Surface	Partner	Opponents	Score
Win	1–0	Jul 2009	ITF Bree, Belgium	10,000	Clay	(Netherlands) Kiki Bertens	(Belgium) An-Sophie Mestach (Netherlands) Demi Schuurs	6–1, 6–0
Win	2–0	Aug 2009	ITF Enschede, Netherlands	10,000	Clay	(Netherlands) Sabine van der Sar	(Netherlands) Daniëlle Harmsen (Netherlands) Kim Kilsdonk	6–2, 4–6, [10–8]
Loss	2–1	May 2010	Wiesbaden Open, Germany	10,000	Clay	(Netherlands) Marlot Meddens	(Serbia) Nataša Zorić (Serbia) Barbara Bonic	2–6, 2–6
Win	3–1	Aug 2010	ITF Westende, Belgium	10,000	Hard	(Netherlands) Demi Schuurs	(Russia) Irina Khromacheva (Belgium) Alison van Uytvanck	3–6, 6–4, 6–4
Win	4–1	Aug 2010	ITF Middelburg, Netherlands	10,000	Clay	(Netherlands) Sabine van der Sar	(Netherlands) Angelique van der Meet (Netherlands) Bernice van de Velde	6–1, 6–0
Win	5–1	Jun 2011	ITF Middelburg, Netherlands	25,000	Clay	(Ukraine) Maryna Zanevska	(United States) Julia Cohen (Argentina) Florencia Molinero	6–3, 6–4
Win	6–1	Oct 2011	ITF Stockholm, Sweden	10,000	Hard (i)	(Netherlands) Lisanne van Riet	(United Kingdom) Eleanor Dean (Germany) Antonia Lottner	7–5, 6–1
Win	7–1	Jan 2012	ITF Sutton, United Kingdom	10,000	Hard (i)	(Republic of Ireland) Amy Bowtell	(France) Elixane Lechemia (France) Irina Ramialison	7–6, 6–3
Win	8–1	Feb 2012	ITF Helsingborg, Sweden	10,000	Carpet (i)	(Republic of Ireland) Amy Bowtell	(Sweden) Mathilda Hamlin (Sweden) Valeria Osadchenko	6–3, 6–4
Win	9–1	Sep 2013	ITF Pula, Italy	10,000	Clay	(Netherlands) Gabriela van de Graaf	(Poland) Agata Barańska (Austria) Pia König	6–4, 6–7^{(10)}, [10–3]
Win	10–1	Oct 2013	ITF Antalya, Turkey	10,000	Clay	(Netherlands) Gabriela van de Graaf	(Belgium) Marie Benoît (Belgium) Kimberley Zimmermann	6–3, 0–6, [10–7]
Loss	10–2	Nov 2013	ITF Helsinki, Finland	10,000	Hard (i)	(Czech Republic) Martina Přádová	(Estonia) Eva Paalma (Latvia) Jeļena Ostapenko	2–6, 7–5, [9–11]
Win	11–2	Jul 2015	ITF Zeeland, Netherlands	15,000	Clay	(Netherlands) Lesley Kerkhove	(Switzerland) Conny Perrin (Ukraine) Alyona Sotnikova	6–2, 3–6, [10–3]
Win	12–2	Aug 2015	ITF Wanfercée-Baulet, Belgium	15,000	Clay	(Netherlands) Eva Wacanno	(Belgium) Elyne Boeykens (Bulgaria) Aleksandrina Naydenova	2–6, 6–2, [10–6]
Win	13–2	Sep 2015	ITF Alphen aan den Rijn, Netherlands	25,000	Clay	(Netherlands) Eva Wacanno	(Netherlands) Lesley Kerkhove (Netherlands) Arantxa Rus	3–6, 6–4, [10–7]
Loss	13–3	Nov 2015	GB Pro-Series Shrewsbury, UK	25,000	Hard (i)	(Netherlands) Lesley Kerkhove	(Switzerland) Xenia Knoll (Italy) Alice Matteucci	6–3, 3–6, [3–10]
Win	14–3	Mar 2016	ITF Orlando, United States	10,000	Clay	(Norway) Ulrikke Eikeri	(Bosnia and Herzegovina) Ema Burgić Bucko (Bulgaria) Dia Evtimova	6–1, 6–3
Loss	14–4	Mar 2016	ITF Naples, United States	25,000	Clay	(United States) Sophie Chang	(Russia) Valeria Solovyeva (Ukraine) Maryna Zanevska	5–7, 0–6
Loss	14–5	Jun 2016	ITF Nieuwpoort, Belgium	10,000	Clay	(Belgium) Steffi Distelmans	(Italy) Amanda Carreras (Italy) Alice Savoretti	2–6, 7–6^{(4)}, [8–10]
Win	15–5	Jul 2016	ITF Middelburg, Netherlands	25,000	Clay	(Netherlands) Eva Wacanno	(Greece) Valentini Grammatikopoulou (Germany) Julia Wachaczyk	6–3, 7–5
Loss	15–6	Aug 2016	ITF Westende, Belgium	25,000	Hard	(Netherlands) Eva Wacanno	(Belgium) Elyne Boeykens (Greece) Valentini Grammatikopoulou	2–6, 3–6
Win	16–6	Sep 2016	ITF Sofia, Bulgaria	25,000	Clay	(Greece) Valentini Grammatikopoulou	(North Macedonia) Lina Gjorcheska (Bulgaria) Viktoriya Tomova	6–4, 4–6, [10–6]
Win	17–6	Sep 2016	Royal Cup, Montenegro	25,000	Clay	(Bosnia and Herzegovina) Anita Husarić	(Serbia) Ivana Jorović (Switzerland) Xenia Knoll	3–6, 6–4, [10–4]
Loss	17–7	Nov 2016	ITF Bratislava, Slovakia	25,000	Hard (i)	(Netherlands) Eva Wacanno	(United Kingdom) Jocelyn Rae (United Kingdom) Anna Smith	3–6, 2–6
Loss	17–8	Jun 2017	ITF Ystad, Sweden	25,000	Clay	(Netherlands) Eva Wacanno	(Russia) Valentyna Ivakhnenko (Mexico) Renata Zarazúa	3–6, 6–3, [5–10]
Loss	17–9	Jul 2017	Internazionale di Roma, Italy	60,000	Clay	(Netherlands) Eva Wacanno	(Russia) Anastasiya Komardina (Argentina) Nadia Podoroska	6–7^{(3)}, 3–6
Loss	17–10	Jul 2018	ITF Denain, France	25,000	Clay	(Netherlands) Eva Wacanno	(Japan) Momoko Kobori (Japan) Ayano Shimizu	6–0, 5–7, [7–10]
Win	18–10	Aug 2018	ITF Las Palmas, Spain	25,000	Hard	(Netherlands) Eva Wacanno	(United Kingdom) Emily Arbuthnott (Sweden) Mirjam Björklund	7–6^{(6)}, 6–1
Win	19–10	Jan 2019	ITF Singapore	W25	Hard	(Netherlands) Arantxa Rus	(Chinese Taipei) Chen Pei-hsuan (Chinese Taipei) Wu Fang-hsien	6–2, 6–4
Win	20–10	Jul 2019	ITF The Hague, Netherlands	W25	Clay	(Greece) Valentini Grammatikopoulou	(Australia) Gabriella Da Silva-Fick (Germany) Anna Klasen	6–2, 5–7, [10–3]
Win	21–10	Nov 2019	ITF Antalya, Turkey	W15	Clay	(Netherlands) Gabriella Mujan	(Romania) Ioana Gașpar (Russia) Nina Rudiukova	6–3, 6–4
Win	22–10	Jan 2021	ITF Cairo, Egypt	W15	Clay	(Netherlands) Gabriella Mujan	(Bosnia and Herzegovina) Dea Herdželaš (Bosnia and Herzegovina) Anita Husarić	4–6, 6–3, [10–6]
Win	23–10	Jun 2021	ITF Alkmaar, Netherlands	W15	Clay	(Netherlands) Gabriella Mujan	(Netherlands) Eva Vedder (Netherlands) Stéphanie Visscher	6–4, 6–1
Win	24–10	Jul 2021	Amstelveen Open, Netherlands	W60	Clay	(Netherlands) Suzan Lamens	(Russia) Amina Anshba (Czech Republic) Anastasia Dețiuc	6–4, 6–3
Win	25–10	Oct 2021	ITF Kiryat Motzkin, Israel	W25	Hard	(Netherlands) Eva Vedder	(Russia) Maria Bondarenko (France) Carole Monnet	6–0, 6–2
Loss	25–11	Jan 2022	ITF Manacor, Spain	W25	Hard	(Netherlands) Bibiane Schoofs	(Czech Republic) Anastasia Dețiuc (Russia) Yana Sizikova	2–6, 3–6
Win	26–11	Feb 2022	Porto Indoor, Portugal	W25	Hard (i)	(Greece) Valentini Grammatikopoulou	(France) Audrey Albié (France) Léolia Jeanjean	6–2, 6–3
Win	27–11	Feb 2022	Porto Indoor 2, Portugal	W25	Hard (i)	(Greece) Valentini Grammatikopoulou	(Hungary) Adrienn Nagy (India) Prarthana Thombare	6–2, 6–0
