= Vanda Lukács =

Hungarian tennis player

- Country (sports): Hungary
- Born: 8 December 1992 (age 33) Hungary
- Plays: Right (two-handed backhand)
- Prize money: US$ 104,504

Singles
- Career record: 324–263
- Career titles: 7 ITF
- Highest ranking: No. 369 (20 March 2017)

Doubles
- Career record: 102–92
- Career titles: 7 ITF
- Highest ranking: No. 396 (12 September 2016)

Vanda Lukács (born 8 December 1992) is a Hungarian former tennis player.

In her career, she won seven singles and seven doubles titles on the ITF Circuit. On 20 March 2017, she reached a career-high singles ranking of world No. 369. On 12 September 2016, she peaked at No. 396 in the doubles rankings.

Lukács made her WTA Tour main-draw debut at the 2011 Budapest Grand Prix. Having been awarded a wildcard, she played against Ajla Tomljanović in the first round, losing in straight sets.

== ITF Circuit finals ==
=== Singles: 14 (7 titles, 7 runner-ups) ===
Legend $15,000 tournaments $10,000 tournaments	Finals by surface Clay (7–7)

Result	W–L	Date	Tournament	Tier	Surface	Opponent	Score
Loss	0–1	Aug 2015	ITF Duino-Aurisina, Italy	10,000	Clay	(Italy) Georgia Brescia	6–3, 6–7^{(4)}, 1–6
Win	1–1	Oct 2015	ITF Pula, Italy	10,000	Clay	(Hungary) Lilla Barzó	4–6, 7–5, 6–3
Loss	1–2	Feb 2016	ITF Hammamet, Tunisia	10,000	Clay	(Austria) Julia Grabher	3–6, 3–6
Win	2–2	Oct 2016	ITF Pula, Italy	10,000	Clay	(Ukraine) Katarina Zavatska	0–6, 6–1, 6–2
Win	3–2	Oct 2016	ITF Pula, Italy	10,000	Clay	(Belgium) Elyne Boeykens	6–1, 6–3
Win	4–2	Oct 2016	ITF Pula, Italy	10,000	Clay	(Switzerland) Ylena In-Albon	6–1, 6–2
Loss	4–3	Nov 2016	ITF Antalya, Turkey	10,000	Clay	(Hungary) Ágnes Bukta	4–6, 6–2, 4–6
Loss	4–4	Sep 2018	ITF Székesfehérvár, Hungary	15,000	Clay	(Romania) Ioana Gașpar	5–7, 3–6
Loss	4–5	May 2019	ITF Heraklion, Greece	15,000	Clay	(Serbia) Draginja Vuković	2–6, 0–2 ret.
Win	5–5	May 2019	ITF Heraklion, Greece	15,000	Clay	(Russia) Darya Astakhova	7–6, 6–2
Win	6–5	Jun 2019	ITF Budapest, Hungary	15,000	Clay	(Slovakia) Chantal Škamlová	6–3, 2–6, 6–3
Loss	6–6	Nov 2019	ITF Bogotá, Colombia	15,000	Clay (i)	(United States) Dasha Ivanova	3–6, 1–2 ret.
Win	7–6	Jun 2021	ITF Antalya, Turkey	15,000	Clay	(Turkey) İlay Yörük	6–0, 5–7, 6–3
Loss	7–7	Oct 2022	ITF Heraklion, Greece	15,000	Clay	(Ukraine) Oleksandra Oliynykova	4–6, 0–1 ret.

=== Doubles: 14 (7 titles, 7 runner-ups) ===
Legend $25,000 tournaments $15,000 tournaments $10,000 tournaments	Finals by surface Hard (0–2) Clay (7–5)

Result	No.	Date	Tournament	Surface	Partner	Opponents	Score
Win	1.	Sep 2011	ITF Athens, Greece	Clay	(Germany) Christina Shakovets	(Poland) Natalia Siedliska (Poland) Sylwia Zagórska	6–3, 6–2
Win	2.	May 2012	ITF Velenje, Slovenia	Clay	(Germany) Anna-Lena Friedsam	(Slovenia) Anja Prislan (Germany) Dejana Raickovic	7–6^{(3)}, 5–7, [10–4]
Loss	1.	Feb 2013	ITF Linköping, Sweden	Hard (i)	(Sweden) Louise Brunskog	(Netherlands) Anna Katalina Alzate Esmurzaeva (Belarus) Darya Shulzhanok	6–4, 2–6, [4–10]
Loss	2.	Jun 2013	ITF Melilla, Spain	Hard	(Egypt) Mayar Sherif	(Spain) Lucía Cervera Vázquez (Spain) Pilar Domínguez López	3–6, 4–6
Loss	3.	Feb 2015	ITF Antalya, Turkey	Clay	(Hungary) Rebeka Stolmár	(Japan) Miki Miyamura (Japan) Aiko Yoshitomi	1–6, 6–7^{(4)}
Win	3.	Oct 2015	ITF Pula, Italy	Clay	(Italy) Camilla Rosatello	(United States) Dasha Ivanova (Argentina) Melany Krywoj	6–3, 6–2
Loss	4.	Apr 2016	ITF Pula, Italy	Clay	(Slovakia) Kristína Schmiedlová	(Italy) Alice Balducci (Spain) Olga Parres Azcoitia	6–3, 2–6, [6–10]
Loss	5.	May 2016	ITF Győr, Hungary	Clay	(Slovakia) Chantal Škamlová	(Hungary) Réka Luca Jani (Croatia) Ana Vrljić	4–6, 3–6
Win	4.	Aug 2016	ITF Sankt Pölten, Austria	Clay	(Poland) Justyna Jegiołka	(Croatia) Mariana Dražić (Austria) Janina Toljan	6–4, 4–6, [11–9]
Win	5.	Apr 2018	ITF Hammamet, Tunisia	Clay	(Germany) Natalia Siedliska	(Paraguay) Montserrat González (United States) Jessica Ho	6–4, 7–5
Win	6.	May 2019	ITF Antalya, Turkey	Clay	(Slovenia) Manca Pislak	(India) Jennifer Luikham (Japan) Ramu Ueda	7–5, 5–7, [10–6]
Loss	6.	May 2019	ITF Heraklion, Greece	Clay	(Kazakhstan) Zhibek Kulambayeva	(Israel) Maya Tahan (Serbia) Draginja Vuković	w/o
Loss	7.	Jul 2019	ITF Getxo, Spain	Clay (i)	(Switzerland) Nina Stadler	(North Macedonia) Lina Gjorcheska (Russia) Anastasiya Komardina	3–6, 6–7^{(4)}
Win	7.	May 2021	ITF Heraklion, Greece	Clay	(Italy) Melania Delai	(Germany) Emily Seibold (Romania) Arina Gabriela Vasilescu	6–2, 6–2

== ITF Junior Circuit finals ==
Category G2
Category G3
Category G4
Category G5

=== Singles (2–0) ===
Result	No.	Date	Tournament	Grade	Surface	Opponent	Score
Win	1.	15 July 2007	Corfu, Greece	G5	Grass	(Austria) Katharina Knöbl	w/o
Win	2.	6 June 2010	Budapest, Hungary	G2	Clay	(Czech Republic) Petra Rohanová	6–0, 6–4
