= Micke Kontinen =

Finnish tennis player

- Full name: Micke Kontinen
- Country (sports): Finland
- Residence: Espoo, Finland
- Born: 18 December 1992 (age 32) Tampere, Finland
- Retired: 2015
- Plays: Right-handed (one handed-backhand)
- Prize money: $41,658

Singles
- Career record: 2–5 (at ATP Tour level, Grand Slam level, and in Davis Cup)
- Career titles: 2 ITF
- Highest ranking: No. 355 (15 September 2014)

Doubles
- Career record: 0–2 (at ATP Tour level, Grand Slam level, and in Davis Cup)
- Career titles: 5 ITF
- Highest ranking: No. 489 (26 May 2014)

Micke Kontinen (born 18 December 1992) is a retired Finnish tennis player. He is the younger brother of Henri Kontinen who is also a tennis player.

Kontinen has a career high ATP singles ranking of 355 achieved on 15 September 2014. He also has a career high ATP doubles ranking of 489 achieved on 26 May 2014.

Kontinen made his ATP main draw debut at the 2013 Swedish Open in the doubles event where he partnered Isak Arvidsson as a wildcard entrant but lost in the first round to Martín Alund and João Souza, 4–6, 6–7^{(5–7)}

Kontinen announced his retirement in September 2015.
