= 2015 Fed Cup Americas Zone =

Subsection of tennis competition

The Americas Zone was one of three zones of regional competition in the 2015 Fed Cup.

== Group I ==
- Venue: La Loma Sports Centre, San Luis Potosí, Mexico (Hard)
- Dates: 4–7 February

The seven teams were divided into one pool of three and one pool of four teams. The two pool winners took part in play-offs to determine the nation advancing to the World Group II play-offs. The nations finished last in their pools took part in relegation play-offs, with the losing nation being relegated to Group II for 2015.

=== Pools ===
	Pool A	BRA	COL	CHI
1	Brazil (2–0)		2–1	3–0
2	Colombia (1–1)	1–2		2–1
3	Chile (0–2)	0–3	1–2	

	Pool B	PAR	MEX	BOL	VEN
1	Paraguay (3–0)		2–1	3–0	3–0
2	Mexico (2–1)	1–2		2–1	3–0
3	Bolivia (1–2)	0–3	1–2		2–1
4	Venezuela (0–3)	0–3	0–3	1–2	

=== Play-offs ===
Placing	A Team	Score	B Team
Promotion	Brazil	1–2	Paraguay
3rd	—N/a	—N/a	Mexico
Relegation	Colombia	2–0	Venezuela
Relegation	Chile	0–2	Bolivia

- Paraguay advanced to World Group II play-offs
- Chile and Venezuela were relegated to Americas Zone Group II in 2016

== Group II ==
- Venue: Centro Nacional de Tenis, Santo Domingo Este, Dominican Republic (Hard)
- Dates: 24–27 June

The twelve teams were divided into four pools of three teams. The four pool winners took part in play-offs to determine the two nations advancing to Americas Zone Group I in 2016.

	Pool A	ECU	BAR	URU
1	Ecuador (2–0)		3–0	3–0
2	Barbados (1–1)	0–3		2–1
3	Uruguay (0–2)	0–3	1–2	

	Pool B	TRI	CRI	BAH
1	Trinidad and Tobago (2–0)		2–1	3–0
2	Costa Rica (1–1)	1–2		2–1
3	Bahamas (0–2)	0–3	1–2	

	Pool C	PER	DOM	HON
1	Peru (2–0)		2–1	3–0
2	Dominican Republic (1–1)	1–2		3–0
3	Honduras (0–2)	0–3	0–3	

	Pool D	GUA	PUR	BER
1	Guatemala (2–0)		2–1	3–0
2	Puerto Rico (1–1)	1–2		3–0
3	Bermuda (0–2)	0–3	0–3	

=== Play-offs ===
Placing	A Team	Score	D Team
Promotion	Ecuador	2–0	Guatemala
5th–8th	Barbados	1–2	Puerto Rico
9th–12th	Uruguay	3–0	Honduras

Placing	B Team	Score	C Team
Promotion	Trinidad and Tobago	0–2	Peru
5th–8th	Costa Rica	1–2	Dominican Republic
9th–12th	Bahamas	2–1	Bermuda

- Ecuador and Peru advanced to Americas Zone Group I in 2016
