= 2015 Fed Cup Americas Zone Group II – play-offs =

The play-offs of the 2015 Fed Cup Americas Zone Group II were the final stages of the Group II Zonal Competition involving teams from the Americas. Using the positions determined in their pools, the twelve teams faced off to determine their placing in the 2015 Fed Cup Americas Zone Group II. The top two teams advanced to Group I for the next year.

| Placing | Pool A | Pool B | Pool C | Pool D |
|---|---|---|---|---|
| 1 | Ecuador | Trinidad and Tobago | Peru | Guatemala |
| 2 | Barbados | Costa Rica | Dominican Republic | Puerto Rico |
| 3 | Uruguay | Bahamas | Honduras | Bermuda |

== Promotion play-off ==
The first placed teams of the four pools were drawn in head-to-head rounds. The winners advanced to Group I.

=== Ecuador vs. Guatemala ===
Ecuador
2
Centro Nacional de Tenis, Santo Domingo Este, Dominican Republic
27 June 2015
Hard (outdoors)

Guatemala
0

| | | | 1 | 2 | 3 |
|---|---|---|---|---|---|---|
| 1 | (Ecuador) (Guatemala) | Camila Romero; Daniela Schippers | 3; 6 | 6; 4 | 6; 4 |
| 2 | (Ecuador) (Guatemala) | Charlotte Römer; Kirsten-Andrea Weedon | 6; 0 | 6; 4 |
| 3 | (Ecuador) (Guatemala) | Doménica González / Charlotte Römer; Melissa Morales / Camila Ramazzini | | | | not played |

=== Trinidad and Tobago vs. Peru ===
Trinidad and Tobago
0
Centro Nacional de Tenis, Santo Domingo Este, Dominican Republic
27 June 2015
Hard (outdoors)

Peru
2

| | | | 1 | 2 | 3 |
|---|---|---|---|---|---|---|
| 1 | (Trinidad and Tobago) (Peru) | Anneliese Rose; Patricia Kú Flores | 2; 6 | 4; 6 |
| 2 | (Trinidad and Tobago) (Peru) | Brena Stampfli; Bianca Botto | 1; 6 | 3; 6 |
| 3 | (Trinidad and Tobago) (Peru) | Anneliese Rose / Brena Stampfli; Patricia Kú Flores / Ximena Siles Luna | | | | not played |

== 5th–8th place play-off ==
The second placed teams of the four pools were drawn in head-to-head rounds to find the equal fifth and sixth placed teams, and the equal seventh to eighth placed teams.

=== Barbados vs. Puerto Rico ===
Barbados
1
Centro Nacional de Tenis, Santo Domingo Este, Dominican Republic
27 June 2015
Hard (outdoors)

Puerto Rico
2

| | | | 1 | 2 | 3 |
|---|---|---|---|---|---|
| 1 | (Barbados) (Puerto Rico) | Kiana Marshall; Julieanne Bou | 6; 4 | 6; 4 |
| 2 | (Barbados) (Puerto Rico) | Melena Lopez; Mónica Matías | 0; 6 | 0; 6 |
| 3 | (Barbados) (Puerto Rico) | Kiana Marshall / Cherise Slocombe; Erica Braschi / Mónica Matías | 2; 6 | 4; 6 |

=== Costa Rica vs. Dominican Republic ===
Costa Rica
1
Centro Nacional de Tenis, Santo Domingo Este, Dominican Republic
27 June 2015
Hard (outdoors)

Dominican Republic
2

| | | | 1 | 2 | 3 |
|---|---|---|---|---|---|
| 1 | (Costa Rica) (Dominican Republic) | Eugenia Camacho; Michelle Marie Valdez | 6; 4 | 6; 2 |
| 2 | (Costa Rica) (Dominican Republic) | Ariana Rahmanparast; Francesca Segarelli | 4; 6 | 1; 6 |
| 3 | (Costa Rica) (Dominican Republic) | Camila Quesada / Ariana Rahmanparast; Karla Portalatin / Francesca Segarelli | 3; 6 | 0; 6 |

== 9th–12th place play-off ==
The third placed teams of the four pools were drawn in head-to-head rounds to find the equal ninth and tenth placed teams, and the equal eleventh to twelfth placed teams.

=== Uruguay vs. Honduras ===
Uruguay
3
Centro Nacional de Tenis, Santo Domingo Este, Dominican Republic
27 June 2015
Hard (outdoors)

Honduras
0

| | | | 1 | 2 | 3 |
|---|---|---|---|---|---|
| 1 | (Uruguay) (Honduras) | Florencia Rossi; Natalie Gabriela Espinal Sánchez | 7^{7} 6^{2} | 7^{7} 6^{2} |
| 2 | (Uruguay) (Honduras) | Margot Mercier; Alejandra Obando | 6; 2 | 7^{7} 6^{2} |
| 3 | (Uruguay) (Honduras) | Margot Mercier / Florencia Rossi; Daniela Obando / Zulema Zelaya | 6; 4 | 6; 2 |

=== Bahamas vs. Bermuda ===
Bahamas
2
Centro Nacional de Tenis, Santo Domingo Este, Dominican Republic
27 June 2015
Hard (outdoors)

Bermuda
1

| | | | 1 | 2 | 3 |
|---|---|---|---|---|---|
| 1 | (The Bahamas) (Bermuda) | Dominique Mortier; Zaire Simmons | 6; 1 | 6; 0 |
| 2 | (The Bahamas) (Bermuda) | Kerrie Cartwright; Cayla Cross | 6; 2 | 6; 1 |
| 3 | (The Bahamas) (Bermuda) | Lauryn Daxon / Sierra Donaldson; Jacklyn Lambert / Kirstin Saltus | 6; 3 | 4; 6 | 3; 6 |

== Final placements ==
| Placing | Teams | |
| Promoted | Ecuador | Peru |
| Third | Guatemala | Trinidad and Tobago |
| Fifth | Puerto Rico | Dominican Republic |
| Seventh | Barbados | Costa Rica |
| Ninth | Uruguay | Bahamas |
| Eleventh | Honduras | Bermuda |

- Ecuador and Peru advanced to Group I.

== See also ==
- Fed Cup structure
