= 2008 Fed Cup =

International women's tennis competition

Details
- Duration: 2 February – 14 September
- Edition: 46th

Achievements (singles)

The 2008 Fed Cup was the 46th edition of the most important competition between national teams in women's tennis.

The final took place at Club de Campo Villa de Madrid in Madrid, Spain, on 13–14 September. The home team, Spain, lost to the defending champion Russia, 0–4, giving Russia their fourth title in five years.

== World Group ==
Participating teams
China	France	Germany	Israel
Italy	Russia	Spain	United States

=== Draw ===
Quarterfinals; 2–3 February
Ramat HaSharon, Israel (Outdoor hard)
1	Russia	4
Israel	1
La Jolla, United States (Outdoor hard)
Germany	1
4	United States	4
Beijing, China (Indoor hard)
3	France	2
China	3
Naples, Italy (Indoor hard)
Spain	3
2	Italy	2

Semifinals; 26–27 April
Moscow, Russia (Indoor clay)
1	Russia	3
4	United States	2
Beijing, China (Indoor hard)
China	1
Spain	4

Final; 13–14 September
Madrid, Spain (Outdoor clay)
1	Russia	4
Spain	0

== World Group play-offs ==
The four losing teams in the World Group first round ties (France, Germany, Israel and Italy), and four winners of the World Group II ties (Argentina, Czech Republic, Japan and Ukraine) entered the draw for the World Group play-offs.

Date: 26–27 April

Venue	Surface	Home team	Score	Visiting team
Ramat HaSharon, Israel	Outdoor hard	Israel	2–3	Czech Republic
Buenos Aires, Argentina	Outdoor clay	Argentina	3–2	Germany
Tokyo, Japan	Indoor hard	Japan	1–4	France
Olbia, Italy	Outdoor clay	Italy	3–2	Ukraine

== World Group II ==
The World Group II is the second highest level of Fed Cup competition in 2008. Winners advanced to the World Group play-offs, and losers played in the World Group II play-offs.

Date: 2–3 February

Venue	Surface	Home team	Score	Visiting team
Kharkiv, Ukraine	Indoor clay	Ukraine	3–2	Belgium (1)
Miki-shi, Japan	Indoor hard	Japan (4)	4–1	Croatia
Brno, Czech Republic	Indoor carpet	Czech Republic (3)	3–2	Slovakia
Buenos Aires, Argentina	Outdoor clay	Argentina	4–1	Austria (2)

== World Group II play-offs ==
The four losing teams from World Group II (Croatia, Slovakia, Belgium and Austria) played off against qualifiers from Zonal Group I. Two teams qualified from Europe/Africa Zone (Serbia and Switzerland), one team from the Asia/Oceania Zone (Uzbekistan), and one team from the Americas Zone (Colombia).

Date: 26–27 April

Venue	Surface	Home team	Score	Visiting team
Zagreb, Croatia	Indoor hard	Croatia	2–3	Serbia
Bratislava, Slovakia	Indoor clay	Slovakia	5–0	Uzbekistan
Mons, Belgium	Indoor hard	Belgium	5–0	Colombia
Dornbirn, Austria	Indoor hard	Austria	2–3	Switzerland

== Americas Zone ==
- Nations in **bold** advanced to the higher level of competition.
- Nations in italics were relegated down to a lower level of competition.

=== Group I ===
Venue: Club Deportivo El Rodeo, Medellín, Colombia (outdoor clay)

Dates: 30 January – 2 February

Participating teams

- Brazil
- Canada
- **Colombia**
- Mexico
- Paraguay
- Puerto Rico
- Uruguay

=== Group II ===
Venue: Country Club Cochabamba, Cochabamba, Bolivia (outdoor clay)

Dates: 23–26 April

Participating teams

- **Bahamas**
- Barbados
- Bermuda
- Bolivia
- Chile
- Cuba
- Dominican Republic
- Ecuador
- Guatemala
- Honduras
- Panama
- Trinidad and Tobago
- **Venezuela**
- withdrawn: Costa Rica, Jamaica, Peru

== Asia/Oceania Zone ==
=== Group I ===
Venue: National Tennis Development Centre, Bangkok, Thailand (outdoor hard)

Dates: 30 January – 2 February

Participating teams

- Australia
- Chinese Taipei
- Hong Kong
- India
- Indonesia
- New Zealand
- Thailand
- **Uzbekistan**

=== Group II ===
Venue: National Tennis Development Centre, Bangkok, Thailand (outdoor hard)

Dates: 30 January – 2 February

Participating teams

- Kazakhstan
- Philippines
- Singapore
- **South Korea**
- Sri Lanka
- Syria
- Turkmenistan
- withdrawn: Jordan

== Europe/Africa Zone ==
=== Group I ===
Venue: SYMA Sportközpont, Budapest, Hungary (indoor carpet)

Dates: 30 January – 2 February

Participating teams

- Belarus
- Bulgaria
- Denmark
- Georgia
- Great Britain
- Hungary
- Luxembourg
- Netherlands
- Poland
- Portugal
- Romania
- **Serbia**
- Slovenia
- Sweden
- **Switzerland**

=== Group II ===
Venue: Coral Tennis Club, Tallinn, Estonia (indoor hard)

Dates: 30 January – 2 February

Participating teams

- **Bosnia and Herzegovina**
- **Estonia**
- Greece
- Ireland
- Lithuania
- South Africa
- Turkey

=== Group III ===
Venue: Master Class Tennis and Fitness Club, Yerevan, Armenia (outdoor clay)

Dates: 22–26 April

Participating teams

- Armenia
- Egypt
- Finland
- Iceland
- **Latvia**
- Mauritius
- Moldova
- Montenegro
- **Morocco**
- Norway
- Zimbabwe
- withdrawn: Liechtenstein, Malta

== Rankings ==
The rankings were measured after the three points during the year that play took place, and were collated by combining points earned from the previous four years.

4 February
Rank	Nation	Points	Move
1	Russia	36,050.0	Steady
2	Italy	23,202.5	Steady
3	France	11,397.5	Steady
4	Spain	10,452.5	▲2
5	United States	10,405.0	▼1
6	China	9,625.0	▲1
7	Belgium	7785.0	▼2
8	Germany	5,112.5	▲1
9	Israel	5,012.5	▼1
10	Japan	4,857.5	▲2

28 April
Rank	Nation	Points	Move
1	Russia	36,050.0	Steady
2	Italy	21,687.5	Steady
3	Spain	15,032.5	▲1
4	United States	10,405.0	▲1
5	France	8,895.0	▼2
6	China	8,267.5	Steady
7	Belgium	6,795.0	Steady
8	Czech Republic	6,150.0	▲3
9	Argentina	5,442.5	▲4
10	Israel	4,225.0	▼1

15 September
Rank	Nation	Points	Move
1	Russia	37,895.0	Steady
2	Italy	19,642.5	Steady
3	Spain	15,032.5	Steady
4	United States	10,405.0	Steady
5	France	8,895.0	Steady
6	China	8,267.5	Steady
7	Belgium	6,795.0	Steady
8	Czech Republic	6,150.0	Steady
9	Argentina	5,442.5	Steady
10	Israel	4,225.0	Steady
