= Argentina Billie Jean King Cup team =

Argentine national women's tennis team

Argentina
- Captain: Paola Suárez
- ITF ranking: 21 ▲ (13 April 2026)
- Colors: light blue & white
- First year: 1964
- Years played: 57
- Ties played (W–L): 185 (113–72)
- Years in World Group: 32 (25–32)
- Best finish: World Group SF 1986, 1993
- Most total wins: Julia Riera (25–8)
- Most singles wins: Julia Riera (21–2)
- Most doubles wins: María Irigoyen (16–6)
- Best doubles team: Gabriela Sabatini / Mercedes Paz (8–0)
- Most ties played: María Irigoyen (30)
- Most years played: Florencia Labat / María Irigoyen (11)

The Argentina women's national tennis team represents Argentina in Billie Jean King Cup tennis competition and are governed by the Asociación Argentina de Tenis. The team's historical best results came in 1986 and 1993, when they reached the semifinals. Argentina played the last five years in the Americas Zone Group I, after being relegated losing World Group II Playoffs against Spain. Argentina are currently number 24 in the ITF rankings.

== History ==
Argentina made its Fed Cup debut in 1964 with a win against Belgium. In the 1984 edition of the Fed Cup, Gabriela Sabatini, Argentina's highest ranked singles female player up to date, made its debut. Two years later, the team made it to the semifinals of the world group where they lost against locals Czechoslovakia. Argentina would not reach the semifinals again until 1993 thanks to the efforts of Florencia Labat, Patricia Tarabini and Inés Gorrochategui.

== First team (1964) ==
- Norma Baylon
- Ana-Maria Bocio

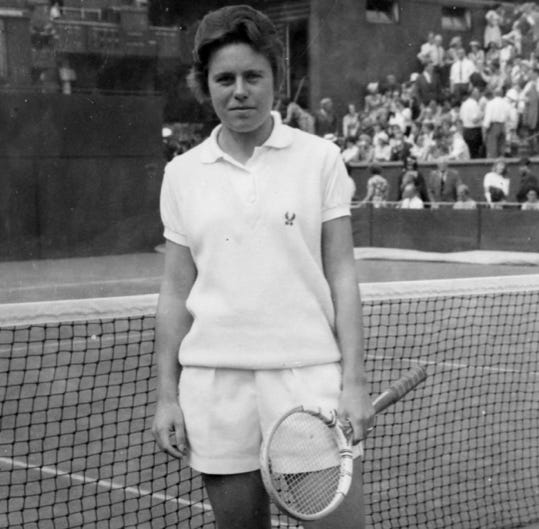
Norma Baylon

== Current squad (2026) ==
- Julia Riera
- Martina Capurro Taborda
- Nicole Fossa Huergo
- Carla Markus
- Luisina Giovannini

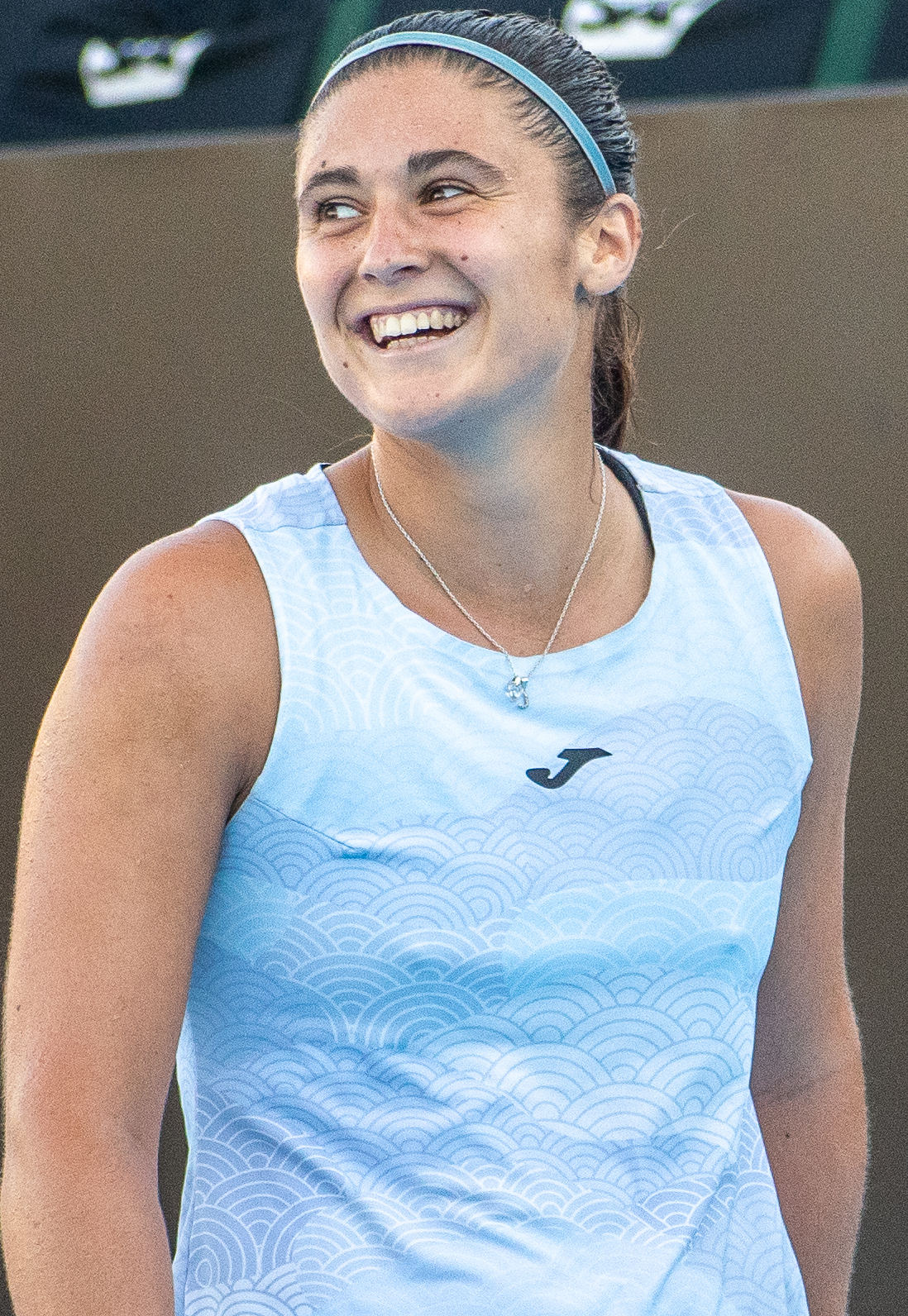
Julia Riera

== Recent performances ==
Here is the list of all match-ups since 1995, when the competition started being held in the current World Group format.

=== 1990s ===
Year	Competition	Date	Location	Opponent	Score	Result
1995	World Group II, 1st round	22–23 Apr	Jakarta (INA)	Indonesia	3–2	Win
1995	World Group, play-offs	22–23 Jul	Tucumán (ARG)	Australia	5–0	Win
1996	World Group, 1st round	27–28 Apr	Amiens (FRA)	France	2–3	Loss
1996	World Group, play-offs	13–14 Jul	Plzeň (CZE)	Czech Republic	1–3	Loss
1997	World Group II, 1st round	1–2 Mar	Seoul (KOR)	South Korea	4–1	Win
1997	World Group, play-offs	12–13 Jul	Zurich (SUI)	Switzerland	0–5	Loss
1998	World Group II, 1st round	18–19 Apr	Buenos Aires (ARG)	Slovakia	1–4	Loss
1998	World Group II, Play-offs	25–26 Jul	Canberra (AUS)	Australia	0–5	Loss
1999	Americas Zone, Group I	14 Apr	Buenos Aires (ARG)	Mexico	3–0	Win
1999	Americas Zone, Group I	15 Apr	Buenos Aires (ARG)	Paraguay	3–0	Win
1999	Americas Zone, Group I	16 Apr	Buenos Aires (ARG)	Ecuador	3–0	Win
1999	Americas Zone, Group I	17 Apr	Buenos Aires (ARG)	Colombia	3–0	Win
1999	Americas Zone, Play-off	18 Apr	Buenos Aires (ARG)	Venezuela	3–0	Win
1999	World Group II, Play-offs	21 Jul	Amsterdam (NED)	Australia	0–5	Loss
1999	World Group II, Play-offs	22 Jul	Amsterdam (NED)	Romania	2–1	Win
1999	World Group II, Play-offs	23 Jul	Amsterdam (NED)	Chinese Taipei	3–0	Win

=== 2000s ===
Year	Competition	Date	Location	Opponent	Score	Result
2000	Americas Zone, Group I	25 Apr	Florianópolis (BRA)	Mexico	3–0	Win
2000	Americas Zone, Group I	26 Apr	Florianópolis (BRA)	Paraguay	3–0	Win
2000	Americas Zone, Group I	28 Apr	Florianópolis (BRA)	Cuba	3–0	Win
2000	Americas Zone, Group I	29 Apr	Florianópolis (BRA)	Colombia	3–0	Win
2000	Americas Zone, Play-offs	30 Apr	Florianópolis (BRA)	Canada	2–1	Win
2001	World Group play-offs, 1st Round	28–29 Apr	Tokyo (JPN)	Japan	4–1	Win
2001	World Group play-offs, 2nd Round	21–22 Jul	Hamburg (GER)	Germany	4–1	Win
2001	World Group, Pool A	8 Nov	Madrid (ESP)	Russia	0–3	Loss
2001	World Group, Pool A	9 Nov	Madrid (ESP)	Czech Republic	2–1	Win
2001	World Group, Pool A	10 Nov	Madrid (ESP)	France	1–2	Loss
2002	World Group, 1st Round	27–28 Apr	Buenos Aires (ARG)	France	2–3	Loss
2002	World Group, play-offs	20–21 Jul	Budapest (HUN)	Hungary	5–0	Win
2003	World Group, 1st Round	25–26 Apr	Pilar (ARG)	Slovenia	2–3	Loss
2003	World Group, play-offs	19–20 Jul	Pilar (ARG)	Hungary	3–2	Win
2004	World Group, 1st Round	24–25 Apr	Buenos Aires (ARG)	Japan	4–1	Win
2004	World Group, Quarterfinals	10–11 Jul	Buenos Aires (ARG)	Russia	1–4	Loss
2005	World Group, 1st Round	23–24 Apr	Jerez (ESP)	Spain	2–3	Loss
2005	World Group, play-offs	9–10 Jul	Bree (BEL)	Belgium	2–3	Loss
2006	World Group II, 1st Round	22–23 Apr	Zagreb (CRO)	Croatia	2–3	Loss
2006	World Group II, Play-offs	15–16 Jul	Edmonton (CAN)	Canada	2–3	Loss
2007	Americas Zone, Group I	18 Apr	Pilar (ARG)	Dominican Republic	3–0	Win
2007	Americas Zone, Group I	19 Apr	Pilar (ARG)	Puerto Rico	3–0	Win
2007	Americas Zone, Group I	20 Apr	Pilar (ARG)	Colombia	3–0	Win
2007	Americas Zone, Play-offs	21 Apr	Pilar (ARG)	Brazil	2–0	Win
2007	World Group II, Play-offs	14–15 Jul	Córdoba (ARG)	Canada	4–1	Win
2008	World Group II, 1st Round	2–3 Feb	Buenos Aires (ARG)	Austria	4–1	Win
2008	World Group, play-offs	26–27 Apr	Pilar (ARG)	Germany	3–2	Win
2009	World Group, 1st Round	7–8 Feb	Surprise (USA)	United States	2–3	Loss
2009	World Group, play-offs	25–26 Apr	Mar del Plata (ARG)	Ukraine	0–5	Loss

=== 2010s ===
Year	Competition	Date	Location	Opponent	Score	Result
2010	World Group II, 1st Round	7–8 Feb	Tallinn (EST)	Estonia	1–4	Loss
2010	World Group, II play-offs	24–25 Apr	Montreal (CAN)	Canada	0–5	Loss
2011	Americas Zone, Group I	2 Feb	Buenos Aires (ARG)	Bolivia	3–0	Win
2011	Americas Zone, Group I	3 Feb	Buenos Aires (ARG)	Paraguay	1–2	Loss
2011	Americas Zone, Group I	4 Feb	Buenos Aires (ARG)	Peru	3–0	Win
2011	Americas Zone, Final	5 Feb	Buenos Aires (ARG)	Colombia	3–0	Win
2011	World Group II, Play-offs	16–17 Jul	Kobe (JPN)	Japan	0–5	Loss
2012	Americas Zone, Group I	1 Feb	Curitiba (BRA)	Bahamas	3–0	Win
2012	Americas Zone, Group I	2 Feb	Curitiba (BRA)	Canada	3–0	Win
2012	Americas Zone, Group I	3 Feb	Curitiba (BRA)	Peru	3–0	Win
2012	Americas Zone, Final	5 Feb	Curitiba (BRA)	Colombia	2–0	Win
2012	World Group II, Play-offs	21–22 Apr	Buenos Aires (ARG)	China	4–1	Win
2013	World Group II	9–10 Feb	Buenos Aires (ARG)	Sweden	2–3	Loss
2013	World Group II, Play-offs	20–21 Apr	Buenos Aires (ARG)	Great Britain	3–1	Win
2014	World Group II	8–9 Feb	Buenos Aires (ARG)	Japan	3–1	Win
2014	World Group play-offs	19–20 Apr	Sochi (RUS)	Russia	0–4	Loss
2015	World Group II	7–8 Feb	Buenos Aires (ARG)	United States	1–4	Loss
2015	World Group II, Play-offs	18–29 Apr	Buenos Aires (ARG)	Spain	0–4	Loss
2016	Americas Zone, Group I	3 Feb	Santa Cruz (BOL)	Ecuador	3–0	Win
2016	Americas Zone, Group I	4 Feb	Santa Cruz (BOL)	Peru	3–0	Win
2016	Americas Zone, Group I	5 Feb	Santa Cruz (BOL)	Brazil	2–1	Win
2016	Americas Zone, Final	6 Feb	Santa Cruz (BOL)	Paraguay	2–0	Win
2016	World Group II, Play-offs	16–27 Apr	Kyiv (UKR)	Ukraine	0–4	Loss
2017	Americas Zone, Group I	6 Feb	Metepec (MEX)	Chile	1–2	Loss
2017	Americas Zone, Group I	7 Feb	Metepec (MEX)	Colombia	3–0	Win
2017	Americas Zone, Group I	8 Feb	Metepec (MEX)	Mexico	2–1	Win
2017	Americas Zone, Group I	9 Feb	Metepec (MEX)	Brazil	2–1	Win
2017	Americas Zone, 3rd–4th	11 Feb	Metepec (MEX)	Paraguay	0–2	Loss
2018	Americas Zone, Group I	7 Feb	Asunción (PAR)	Guatemala	3–0	Win
2018	Americas Zone, Group I	8 Feb	Asunción (PAR)	Venezuela	3–0	Win
2018	Americas Zone, Group I	9 Feb	Asunción (PAR)	Brazil	1–2	Loss
2018	Americas Zone, 3rd–4th	10 Feb	Asunción (PAR)	Colombia	2–0	Win
2019	Americas Zone, Group I	6 Feb	Medellín (COL)	Brazil	1–2	Loss
2019	Americas Zone, Group I	7 Feb	Medellín (COL)	Chile	0–3	Loss
2019	Americas Zone, Group I	8 Feb	Medellín (COL)	Puerto Rico	2–1	Win
2019	Americas Zone, Relegation	9 Feb	Medellín (COL)	Ecuador	2–1	Win

=== 2020s ===
Year	Competition	Date	Location	Opponent	Score	Result
2020–21	Americas Zone, Group I	5 February 2020	Santiago (CHI)	Mexico	2–1	Win
2020–21	Americas Zone, Group I	6 February 2020	Santiago (CHI)	Chile	2–1	Win
2020–21	Americas Zone, Group I	7 February 2020	Santiago (CHI)	Peru	3–0	Win
2020–21	Americas Zone, Group I Play-offs	8 February 2020	Santiago (CHI)	Colombia	2–0	Win
2020–21	Play-offs	16–17 April 2021	Córdoba (ARG)	Kazakhstan	2–3	Loss
2022	Americas Zone, Group I	13 April	Salinas (ECU)	Colombia	3–0	Win
2022	Americas Zone, Group I	14 April	Salinas (ECU)	Brazil	1–2	Loss
2022	Americas Zone, Group I	15 April	Salinas (ECU)	Guatemala	3–0	Win
2022	Americas Zone, Group I Play-offs	16 April	Salinas (ECU)	Mexico	2–0	Win
2022	Play-offs	11–12 November	San Miguel de Tucumán (ARG)	Brazil	1–3	Loss
2023	Americas Zone, Group I	11 April	Cúcuta (COL)	Guatemala	3–0	Win
2023	Americas Zone, Group I	12 April	Cúcuta (COL)	Bolivia	3–0	Win
2023	Americas Zone, Group I	13 April	Cúcuta (COL)	Chile	3–0	Win
2023	Americas Zone, Group I	14 April	Cúcuta (COL)	Peru	2–1	Win
2023	Americas Zone, Group I	15 April	Cúcuta (COL)	Colombia	3–0	Win
2023	Play-offs	10–11 November	Bratislava (SVK)	Slovakia	1–3	Loss
2024	Americas Zone, Group I	9 April	Bogotá (COL)	Peru	2–1	Win
2024	Americas Zone, Group I	10 April	Bogotá (COL)	Ecuador	3–0	Win
2024	Americas Zone, Group I	11 April	Bogotá (COL)	Venezuela	3–0	Win
2024	Americas Zone, Group I	12 April	Bogotá (COL)	Chile	3–0	Win
2024	Americas Zone, Group I	13 April	Bogotá (COL)	Colombia	1–2	Loss
2024	Play-offs	15–16 November	São Paulo (BRA)	Brazil	2-3	Loss
2025	Americas Zone, Group I	8 April	Guadalajara (MEX)	Guatemala	3–0	Win
2025	Americas Zone, Group I	9 April	Guadalajara (MEX)	Chile	3–0	Win
2025	Americas Zone, Group I	10 April	Guadalajara (MEX)	Venezuela	2–1	Win
2025	Americas Zone, Group I	11 April	Guadalajara (MEX)	Paraguay	3–0	Win
2025	Americas Zone, Group I	13 April	Guadalajara (MEX)	Mexico	0–3	Loss
2025	Play-offs, Group C	14 November	Córdoba (ARG)	Slovakia	3-0	Win
2025	Play-offs, Group C	16 November	Córdoba (ARG)	Switzerland	1-2	Loss
2026	Americas Zone, Group I	8 April	Ibague (COL)	Peru	3–0	Win
2026	Americas Zone, Group I	9 April	Ibague (COL)	Brazil	1–2	Loss
2026	Americas Zone, Group I	10 April	Ibague (COL)	Chile	3–0	Win
2026	Americas Zone, Group I	11 April	Ibague (COL)	Ecuador	2–0	Win

== See also ==
- Billie Jean King Cup
- Argentina Davis Cup team
- Argentina at the Hopman Cup
