= 2025 Billie Jean King Cup Americas Zone =

Subsection of tennis competition

The Americas Zone is one of three zones of regional competition in the 2025 Billie Jean King Cup.

== Group I ==
- Date: 8–12 April 2025
- Venue: Mouratoglou Tennis Center, Guadalajara, Mexico (Hard)

One round-robin pool of six teams, with the top two teams promoted to the Play-offs in November 2025, while the bottom two teams are relegated to Americas Group II in 2026.

=== Participating teams ===
- Argentina

(Julia Riera, Jazmín Ortenzi, Luisina Giovannini, Julieta Lara Estable,
Captain: Mercedes Paz)

- Chile

(Fernanda Labraña, Antonia Vergara Rivera, Jimar Gerald González, Fernanda Rain Contreras, Paula Gutierrez
Captain: Paulina Sepúlveda)

- Guatemala

(Kirsten-Andrea Weedon, Nina Chávez, Carlota Balseiro,
Captain: Anthony Vásquez)

- Mexico

(Victoria Rodríguez, Ana Sofía Sánchez, Fernanda Contreras Gómez, Giuliana Olmos, María Fernanda Navarro Oliva,
Captain: Agustín Moreno)

- Paraguay

(Leyla Britez, Paulina Franco Martinessi, Catalina Delmás, Victoria Lopez,
Captain: Alfredo De Brix)

- Venezuela

(Sofía Cabezas, Andrea Gámiz, Lorelyz Marruffo, Sabrina Balderrama, Vanessa Suárez,
Captain: William Campos)

=== Main Draw ===
#	Team	P	W	L	Matches W-L	Sets W-L
1	Mexico	5	5	0	15–0	30–2
2	Argentina	5	4	1	11–4	24–10
3	Chile	5	3	2	7–8	16–20
4	Venezuela	5	2	3	6–9	14–19
5	Paraguay	5	1	4	3–12	7–25
6	Guatemala	5	0	5	3–12	9–24

==== Mexico vs Paraguay ====
Mexico
3
Mouratoglou Tennis Center, Guadalajara, Mexico
8 April 2025
Hard

Paraguay
0

			1	2	3
1	(Mexico) (Paraguay)	Victoria Rodríguez; Paulina Franco	6; 0	6; 0
2	(Mexico) (Paraguay)	Ana Sofía Sánchez; Leyla Britez	6; 4	6; 0
3	(Mexico) (Paraguay)	Fernanda Contreras Gómez / Giuliana Olmos; Leyla Britez / Paulina Franco	6; 4	6; 3

==== Argentina vs Guatemala ====
Argentina
3
Mouratoglou Tennis Center, Guadalajara, Mexico
8 April 2025
Hard

Guatemala
0

			1	2	3
1	(Argentina) (Guatemala)	Jazmín Ortenzi; Nina Chávez	6; 0	6; 0
2	(Argentina) (Guatemala)	Julia Riera; Kirsten-Andrea Weedon	6; 2	6^{5} 7^{7}	6; 0
3	(Argentina) (Guatemala)	Luisina Giovannini / Julieta Lara Estable; Nina Chávez / Carlota Balseiro	6; 3	6; 3

==== Chile vs Venezuela ====
Chile
3
Mouratoglou Tennis Center, Guadalajara, Mexico
8 April 2025
Hard

Venezuela
0

			1	2	3
1	(Chile) (Venezuela)	Jimar Gerald González; Sabrina Balderrama	5; 7	6; 2	6; 3
2	(Chile) (Venezuela)	Antonia Vergara Rivera; Sofía Cabezas	6; 4	6; 4
3	(Chile) (Venezuela)	Antonia Vergara Rivera / Fernanda Labraña; Sofía Cabezas / Andrea Gámiz	6; 3	2; 6	10; 7

==== Mexico vs Venezuela ====
Mexico
3
Mouratoglou Tennis Center, Guadalajara, Mexico
9 April 2025
Hard

Venezuela
0

			1	2	3
1	(Mexico) (Venezuela)	Victoria Rodríguez; Lorelyz Marruffo	6; 0	6; 0
2	(Mexico) (Venezuela)	Ana Sofía Sánchez; Sofía Cabezas	6; 0	6; 2
3	(Mexico) (Venezuela)	Fernanda Contreras Gómez / Giuliana Olmos; Sofía Cabezas / Andrea Gámiz	6; 1	7^{8} 6^{6}

==== Argentina vs Chile ====
Argentina
3
Mouratoglou Tennis Center, Guadalajara, Mexico
9 April 2025
Hard

Chile
0

			1	2	3
1	(Argentina) (Chile)	Jazmín Ortenzi; Antonia Vergara Rivera	6; 2	6; 2
2	(Argentina) (Chile)	Julia Riera; Fernanda Labraña	6; 0	6; 1
3	(Argentina) (Chile)	Luisina Giovannini / Julieta Lara Estable; Fernanda Labraña / Antonia Vergara Rivera	2; 6	7; 5	10; 7

==== Guatemala vs Paraguay ====
Guatemala
1
Mouratoglou Tennis Center, Guadalajara, Mexico
9 April 2025
Hard

Paraguay
2

			1	2	3
1	(Guatemala) (Paraguay)	Carlota Balseiro; Catalina Delmás	6; 1	6; 2
2	(Guatemala) (Paraguay)	Kirsten-Andrea Weedon; Leyla Britez	0; 6	2; 6
3	(Guatemala) (Paraguay)	Nina Chávez / Kirsten-Andrea Weedon; Leyla Britez / Paulina Franco	3; 6	7; 5	4; 10

==== Mexico vs Guatemala ====
Mexico
3
Mouratoglou Tennis Center, Guadalajara, Mexico
10 April 2025
Hard

Guatemala
0

			1	2	3
1	(Mexico) (Guatemala)	Victoria Rodríguez; Nina Chávez	6; 1	6; 0
2	(Mexico) (Guatemala)	Ana Sofía Sánchez; Kirsten-Andrea Weedon	6; 2	6; 3
3	(Mexico) (Guatemala)	Fernanda Contreras Gómez / Giuliana Olmos; Carlota Balseiro / Nina Chávez	6; 0	6; 0

==== Argentina vs Venezuela ====
Argentina
2
Mouratoglou Tennis Center, Guadalajara, Mexico
10 April 2025
Hard

Venezuela
1

			1	2	3
1	(Argentina) (Venezuela)	Jazmín Ortenzi; Sabrina Balderrama	6; 2	6; 1
2	(Argentina) (Venezuela)	Julia Riera; Sofía Cabezas	6; 2	6; 3
3	(Argentina) (Venezuela)	Luisina Giovannini / Julieta Lara Estable; Sofía Cabezas / Andrea Gámiz	4; 6	6; 2	8; 10

==== Chile vs Paraguay ====
Chile
2
Mouratoglou Tennis Center, Guadalajara, Mexico
10 April 2025
Hard

Paraguay
1

			1	2	3
1	(Chile) (Paraguay)	Antonia Vergara Rivera; Catalina Delmás	6; 1	6; 2
2	(Chile) (Paraguay)	Fernanda Labraña; Leyla Britez	1; 6	3; 6
3	(Chile) (Paraguay)	Antonia Vergara Rivera / Fernanda Labraña; Leyla Britez / Paulina Franco	7; 5	2; 6	10; 8

==== Mexico vs Chile ====
Mexico
3
Mouratoglou Tennis Center, Guadalajara, Mexico
11 April 2025
Hard

Chile
0

			1	2	3
1	(Mexico) (Chile)	Victoria Rodríguez; Jimar Gerald González	6; 2	6; 2
2	(Mexico) (Chile)	Ana Sofía Sánchez; Antonia Vergara Rivera	2; 6	6; 2	6; 1
3	(Mexico) (Chile)	Fernanda Contreras Gómez / Giuliana Olmos; Fernanda Labraña / Fernanda Rain Contreras	6; 4	6; 2

==== Argentina vs Paraguay ====
Argentina
3
Mouratoglou Tennis Center, Guadalajara, Mexico
11 April 2025
Hard

Paraguay
0

			1	2	3
1	(Argentina) (Paraguay)	Jazmín Ortenzi; Victoria Lopez	6; 0	6; 1
2	(Argentina) (Paraguay)	Julia Riera; Leyla Britez	6; 4	6; 4
3	(Argentina) (Paraguay)	Luisina Giovannini / Julieta Lara Estable; Leyla Britez / Paulina Franco	6; 0	6; 3

==== Venezuela vs Guatemala ====
Venezuela
2
Mouratoglou Tennis Center, Guadalajara, Mexico
11 April 2025
Hard

Guatemala
1

			1	2	3
1	(Venezuela) (Guatemala)	Sabrina Balderrama; Carlota Balseiro	6; 3	6; 2
2	(Venezuela) (Guatemala)	Sofía Cabezas; Kirsten-Andrea Weedon	6^{5} 7^{7}	2; 6
3	(Venezuela) (Guatemala)	Sofía Cabezas / Andrea Gámiz; Kirsten-Andrea Weedon / Nina Chávez	6; 2	6; 1

==== Mexico vs Argentina ====
Mexico
3
Mouratoglou Tennis Center, Guadalajara, Mexico
12 April 2025
Hard

Argentina
0

			1	2	3
1	(Mexico) (Argentina)	Victoria Rodríguez; Jazmín Ortenzi	6; 3	6; 4
2	(Mexico) (Argentina)	Ana Sofía Sánchez; Julia Riera	6; 3	1; 6	6; 2
3	(Mexico) (Argentina)	Fernanda Contreras Gómez / Giuliana Olmos; Luisina Giovannini / Julieta Lara Estable	6; 2	7; 5

==== Chile vs Guatemala ====
Chile
2
Mouratoglou Tennis Center, Guadalajara, Mexico
12 April 2025
Hard

Guatemala
1

			1	2	3
1	(Chile) (Guatemala)	Jimar Gerald González; Nina Chávez	6; 1	6; 1
2	(Chile) (Guatemala)	Antonia Vergara Rivera; Kirsten-Andrea Weedon	2; 6	6; 1	6; 4
3	(Chile) (Guatemala)	Paula Gutierrez / Fernanda Rain Contreras; Nina Chávez / Carlota Balseiro	4; 6	3; 6

==== Venezuela vs Paraguay ====
Venezuela
3
Mouratoglou Tennis Center, Guadalajara, Mexico
12 April 2025
Hard

Paraguay
0

			1	2	3
1	(Venezuela) (Paraguay)	Sabrina Balderrama; Catalina Delmás	7^{7} 6^{4}	6; 2
2	(Venezuela) (Paraguay)	Sofía Cabezas; Paulina Franco	6; 2	6; 2
3	(Venezuela) (Paraguay)	Sofía Cabezas / Andrea Gámiz; Catalina Delmás / Victoria Lopez	6; 2	6; 2

=== Promotions/Relegations ===
- Argentina and Mexico were promoted to the 2025 Billie Jean King Cup play-offs.
- Guatemala and Paraguay were relegated to Americas Zone Group II in 2026.

== Group II ==
- Date: 18–21 June 2025
- Venue: Club Lawn Tennis de la Exposición, Lima, Peru (Clay)

Two round-robin pools of four (Pool A, Pool B), followed by the top two nations in each pool facing each other in promotional play-offs (A1 v B2, B1 v A2). The bottom two nations will compete to avoid relegation (A3 v B4, B3 v A4).

The two teams to win their promotional play-off will advance to Americas Group I in 2026, whereas the two teams to lose their relegation play-offs will drop down to Americas Group III next year.

=== Participating teams ===
- Barbados

(Gabrielle Leslie, Hannah Chambers, Serena Bryan, Shonte Sargeant,
Captain: Seanon Williams)

- Bolivia

(Noelia Zeballos, Nathalie Marinovitch, Natalia Trigosso, Mariana Zurita,
Captain: Rolando Nieva)

- Costa Rica

(Nicole Alfaro, Lucia Gallegos, Allison Blanco, Valentina Obregon,
Captain: Andrea Brenes)

- Dominican Republic

(Ana Carmen Zamburek, Anna Maria Fedotova, Kelly Williford, María Castaño,
Captain: Daysi Espinal)

- Ecuador

(Camila Romero, Mell Reasco, Tânia Andrade, Valeska San Martín, Valentina Vargas
Captain: Doménica González)

- Honduras

(Isabella Alvarez, Natalie Espinal, Alejandra Obando, Alyssa Sucrovich,
Captain: Edwin Marcia)

- Peru

(Lucciana Pérez Alarcón, Dana Guzmán, Francesca Maguina, Yleymi Muelle, Daniela Gonzales
Captain: Laura Arraya)

- Puerto Rico

(Natalia Perez, Lauren Kettlewell, Carolina Castro, Aurora Lugo,
Captain: Yolimar Ogando)

=== Pool A ===
#	Team	P	W	L	Matches W-L	Sets W-L
1	Peru	3	3	0	9–0	18–0
2	Ecuador	3	2	1	6–3	12–6
3	Costa Rica	3	1	2	2–7	4–14
4	Honduras	3	0	3	1–8	2–16

==== Peru vs Honduras ====
Peru
3
Club Lawn Tennis de la Exposición, Lima, Peru
18 June 2025
Clay

Honduras
0

			1	2	3
1	(Peru) (Honduras)	Dana Guzmán; Alejandra Obando	6; 1	6; 0
2	(Peru) (Honduras)	Lucciana Pérez Alarcón; Natalie Espinal	6; 0	6; 2
3	(Peru) (Honduras)	Dana Guzmán / Lucciana Pérez Alarcón; Isabella Alvarez / Alyssa Sucrovich	6; 0	6; 0

==== Ecuador vs Costa Rica ====
Ecuador
3
Club Lawn Tennis de la Exposición, Lima, Peru
18 June 2025
Clay

Costa Rica
0

			1	2	3
1	(Ecuador) (Costa Rica)	Mell Reasco; Lucia Gallegos	6; 2	6; 2
2	(Ecuador) (Costa Rica)	Camila Romero; Nicole Alfaro	6; 2	6; 0
3	(Ecuador) (Costa Rica)	Mell Reasco / Camila Romero; Allison Blanco / Valentina Obregon	6; 0	6; 0

==== Peru vs Costa Rica ====
Peru
3
Club Lawn Tennis de la Exposición, Lima, Peru
19 June 2025
Clay

Costa Rica
0

			1	2	3
1	(Peru) (Costa Rica)	Dana Guzmán; Lucia Gallegos	6; 0	6; 1
2	(Peru) (Costa Rica)	Lucciana Pérez Alarcón; Nicole Alfaro	6; 0	6; 1
3	(Peru) (Costa Rica)	Francesca Maguina / Yleymi Muelle; Allison Blanco / Valentina Obregon	6; 0	6; 2

==== Ecuador vs Honduras ====
Ecuador
3
Club Lawn Tennis de la Exposición, Lima, Peru
19 June 2025
Clay

Honduras
0

			1	2	3
1	(Ecuador) (Honduras)	Mell Reasco; Alejandra Obando	6; 0	6; 3
2	(Ecuador) (Honduras)	Camila Romero; Natalie Espinal	7; 5	6; 3
3	(Ecuador) (Honduras)	Tânia Andrade / Valeska San Martín; Isabella Alvarez / Alyssa Sucrovich	6; 0	6; 1

==== Peru vs Ecuador ====
Peru
3
Club Lawn Tennis de la Exposición, Lima, Peru
20 June 2025
Clay

Ecuador
0

			1	2	3
1	(Peru) (Ecuador)	Dana Guzmán; Mell Reasco	6; 1	6; 2
2	(Peru) (Ecuador)	Lucciana Pérez Alarcón; Camila Romero	6; 1	6; 1
3	(Peru) (Ecuador)	Francesca Maguina / Yleymi Muelle; Tânia Andrade / Valeska San Martín	6; 1	6; 2

==== Honduras vs Costa Rica ====
Honduras
1
Club Lawn Tennis de la Exposición, Lima, Peru
20 June 2025
Clay

Costa Rica
2

			1	2	3
1	(Honduras) (Costa Rica)	Alejandra Obando; Lucia Gallegos	4; 6	3; 6
2	(Honduras) (Costa Rica)	Natalie Espinal; Nicole Alfaro	6; 1	6; 0
3	(Honduras) (Costa Rica)	Natalie Espinal / Alejandra Obando; Nicole Alfaro / Lucia Gallegos	6^{7} 7^{9}	6^{3} 7^{7}

=== Pool B ===
#	Team	P	W	L	Matches W-L	Sets W-L
1	Bolivia	3	3	0	6–3	12–8
2	Puerto Rico	3	1	2	5–4	11–9
3	Barbados	3	1	2	4–5	8–11
4	Dominican Republic	3	1	2	3–6	9–12

==== Bolivia vs Puerto Rico ====
Bolivia
2
Club Lawn Tennis de la Exposición, Lima, Peru
18 June 2025
Clay

Puerto Rico
1

			1	2	3
1	(Bolivia) (Puerto Rico)	Nathalie Marinovitch; Lauren Kettlewell	0; 6	4; 6
2	(Bolivia) (Puerto Rico)	Noelia Zeballos; Natalia Perez	6; 0	6; 2
3	(Bolivia) (Puerto Rico)	Natalia Trigosso / Noelia Zeballos; Carolina Castro / Natalia Perez	4; 6	6; 1	10; 7

==== Dominican Republic vs Barbados ====
Dominican Republic
2
Club Lawn Tennis de la Exposición, Lima, Peru
18 June 2025
Clay

Barbados
1

			1	2	3
1	(Dominican Republic) (Barbados)	Anna Maria Fedotova; Hannah Chambers	6; 1	6; 3
2	(Dominican Republic) (Barbados)	Ana Carmen Zamburek; Gabrielle Leslie	6^{5} 7^{7}	6; 1	5; 7
3	(Dominican Republic) (Barbados)	Anna Maria Fedotova / Kelly Williford; Serena Bryan / Hannah Chambers	6; 3	6; 3

==== Bolivia vs Barbados ====
Bolivia
2
Club Lawn Tennis de la Exposición, Lima, Peru
19 June 2025
Clay

Barbados
1

			1	2	3
1	(Bolivia) (Barbados)	Natalia Trigosso; Hannah Chambers	4; 6	3; 6
2	(Bolivia) (Barbados)	Noelia Zeballos; Gabrielle Leslie	6; 0	6; 0
3	(Bolivia) (Barbados)	Natalia Trigosso / Noelia Zeballos; Serena Bryan / Hannah Chambers	6; 0	6; 1

==== Dominican Republic vs Puerto Rico ====
Dominican Republic
0
Club Lawn Tennis de la Exposición, Lima, Peru
19 June 2025
Clay

Puerto Rico
3

			1	2	3
1	(Dominican Republic) (Puerto Rico)	Kelly Williford; Carolina Castro	1; 6	1; 6
2	(Dominican Republic) (Puerto Rico)	Anna Maria Fedotova; Lauren Kettlewell	6^{4} 7^{7}	5; 7
3	(Dominican Republic) (Puerto Rico)	Kelly Williford / Ana Carmen Zamburek; Carolina Castro / Aurora Lugo	6^{7} 7^{9}	7; 5	10; 12

==== Bolivia vs Dominican Republic ====
Bolivia
2
Club Lawn Tennis de la Exposición, Lima, Peru
20 June 2025
Clay

Dominican Republic
1

			1	2	3
1	(Bolivia) (Dominican Republic)	Natalia Trigosso; Anna Maria Fedotova	6; 4	5; 7	6; 2
2	(Bolivia) (Dominican Republic)	Noelia Zeballos; Ana Carmen Zamburek	6; 3	6; 3
3	(Bolivia) (Dominican Republic)	Nathalie Marinovitch / Mariana Zurita; Anna Maria Fedotova / Kelly Williford	5; 7	1; 6

==== Puerto Rico vs Barbados ====
Puerto Rico
1
Club Lawn Tennis de la Exposición, Lima, Peru
20 June 2025
Clay

Barbados
2

			1	2	3
1	(Puerto Rico) (Barbados)	Aurora Lugo; Hannah Chambers	7^{7} 6^{2}	6; 4
2	(Puerto Rico) (Barbados)	Carolina Castro; Gabrielle Leslie	6^{1} 7^{7}	6^{12} 7^{14}
3	(Puerto Rico) (Barbados)	Lauren Kettlewell / Natalia Perez; Serena Bryan / Hannah Chambers	3; 6	4; 6

=== Promotion Play-Offs ===
==== Peru vs Puerto Rico ====
Peru
2
Club Lawn Tennis de la Exposición, Lima, Peru
21 June 2025
Clay

Puerto Rico
0

			1	2	3
1	(Peru) (Puerto Rico)	Dana Guzmán; Carolina Castro	6; 1	6; 1
2	(Peru) (Puerto Rico)	Lucciana Pérez Alarcón; Lauren Kettlewell	6; 0	6; 0
3	(Peru) (Puerto Rico)	Dana Guzmán / Lucciana Pérez Alarcón; Carolina Castro / Aurora Lugo				not played

==== Bolivia vs Ecuador ====
Bolivia
1
Club Lawn Tennis de la Exposición, Lima, Peru
21 June 2025
Clay

Ecuador
2

			1	2	3
1	(Bolivia) (Ecuador)	Natalia Trigosso; Mell Reasco	1; 6	1; 6
2	(Bolivia) (Ecuador)	Noelia Zeballos; Camila Romero	7^{9} 6^{7}	7; 5
3	(Bolivia) (Ecuador)	Natalia Trigosso / Noelia Zeballos; Mell Reasco / Camila Romero	6; 4	5; 7	11; 13

=== Relegation Play-Offs ===
==== Costa Rica vs Dominican Republic ====
Costa Rica
0
Club Lawn Tennis de la Exposición, Lima, Peru
21 June 2025
Clay

Dominican Republic
2

			1	2	3
1	(Costa Rica) (Dominican Republic)	Lucia Gallegos; Anna Maria Fedotova	3; 6	3; 6
2	(Costa Rica) (Dominican Republic)	Nicole Alfaro; Ana Carmen Zamburek	6^{8} 7^{10}			retired
3	(Costa Rica) (Dominican Republic)	Nicole Alfaro / Lucia Gallegos; Anna Maria Fedotova / Kelly Williford				not played

==== Barbados vs Honduras ====
Barbados
1
Club Lawn Tennis de la Exposición, Lima, Peru
21 June 2025
Clay

Honduras
2

			1	2	3
1	(Barbados) (Honduras)	Hannah Chambers; Alejandra Obando	6; 3	6; 3
2	(Barbados) (Honduras)	Gabrielle Leslie; Natalie Espinal	0; 6	4; 6
3	(Barbados) (Honduras)	Serena Bryan / Hannah Chambers; Natalie Espinal / Alejandra Obando	5; 7	0; 6

=== Promotions/Relegations ===
- Ecuador and Peru were promoted to Americas Zone Group I in 2026.
- Barbados and Costa Rica were relegated to Americas Zone Group III in 2026.

== Group III ==
- Date: 18–23 August 2025
- Venue: Santa Tecla, El Salvador

Two-stage round robin, with one pool of three (Pool A) and two pools of four (Pool B, Pool C), followed by the winners of each pool playing each other in a round robin (A1, B1, C1). The top two teams in that round robin are promoted to Americas Group II in 2026.

=== Participating teams ===
- Antigua and Barbuda
- Bahamas
- Cuba
- El Salvador
- Jamaica
- Panama
- Saint Lucia
- Suriname
- Trinidad and Tobago
- Uruguay
- U.S. Virgin Islands

Withdrawn

- Aruba
- Bermuda

Inactive teams

- Eastern Caribbean
- Haiti

=== Pool A ===
#	Team	P	W	L	Matches W-L	Sets W-L
1	Uruguay	2	2	0	4–2	8–6
2	Saint Lucia	2	1	1	3–3	7–6
3	Panama	2	0	2	2–4	5–8

Panama
1
Santa Tecla, El Salvador
18 August 2025
Hard

Saint Lucia
2

			1	2	3
1	(Panama) (Saint Lucia)	Michelle Agelvis; Julia Natasha Anastasia D'Auvergne	6; 2	6; 0
2	(Panama) (Saint Lucia)	Karla Ching; Jessica Eudovic	1; 6	2; 6
3	(Panama) (Saint Lucia)	Anna Louise Bjørnestad / Liz Marie Calderon; Jessica Eudovic / Stacey Roheman	2; 6	1; 6

Uruguay
2
Santa Tecla, El Salvador
19 August 2025
Hard

Saint Lucia
1

			1	2	3
1	(Uruguay) (Saint Lucia)	Josefina Soldo; Stacey Roheman	6; 1	6; 0
2	(Uruguay) (Saint Lucia)	Juliana Rodríguez; Jessica Eudovic	5; 7	1; 6
3	(Uruguay) (Saint Lucia)	Juliana Rodríguez / Josefina Soldo; Stacey Roheman / Jessica Eudovic	6; 1	5; 7	10; 8

Uruguay
2
Santa Tecla, El Salvador
20 August 2025
Hard

Panama
1

			1	2	3
1	(Uruguay) (Panama)	Josefina Soldo; Michelle Agelvis	4; 6	3; 6
2	(Uruguay) (Panama)	Juliana Rodríguez; Anna Louise Bjørnestad	3; 6	7; 5	6; 4
3	(Uruguay) (Panama)	Juliana Rodríguez / Josefina Soldo; Anna Louise Bjørnestad / Michelle Agelvis	6; 2	6; 0

=== Pool B ===
#	Team	P	W	L	Matches W-L	Sets W-L
1	Bahamas	3	3	0	7–2	14–4
2	Jamaica	3	2	1	7–2	14–5
3	Trinidad and Tobago	3	1	2	3–6	7–12
4	Suriname	3	0	3	1–8	2–16

Jamaica
3
Santa Tecla, El Salvador
18 August 2025
Hard

Suriname
0

			1	2	3
1	(Jamaica) (Suriname)	Adeola Greatorex; Faith Bab	6; 1	6; 1
2	(Jamaica) (Suriname)	Najah Dawson; Anouk Ma-Ajong	6; 0	6; 0
3	(Jamaica) (Suriname)	Holly Reid / Katherine Dibbs; Kayla Currie / Jill Ma-Ajong	6; 0	6; 0

Bahamas
2
Santa Tecla, El Salvador
18 August 2025
Hard

Trinidad and Tobago
1

			1	2	3
1	(The Bahamas) (Trinidad and Tobago)	Simone Pratt; Charlotte Ready	6; 0	6; 0
2	(The Bahamas) (Trinidad and Tobago)	Sydney-Nicole Clarke; Jordane Dookie	6; 4	6; 3
3	(The Bahamas) (Trinidad and Tobago)	Sydney-Nicole Clarke / Simone Pratt; Jordane Dookie / Anneliese Rose	4; 6	6^{8} 7^{10}

Bahamas
3
Santa Tecla, El Salvador
19 August 2025
Hard

Suriname
0

			1	2	3
1	(The Bahamas) (Suriname)	Simone Pratt; Faith Bab	6; 0	6; 0
2	(The Bahamas) (Suriname)	Sydney-Nicole Clarke; Anouk Ma-Ajong	6; 2	6; 1
3	(The Bahamas) (Suriname)	Jalisa Victoria Clarke / Sydney-Nicole Clarke; Kayla Currie / Anouk Ma-Ajong	6; 3	6; 0

Jamaica
3
Santa Tecla, El Salvador
19 August 2025
Hard

Trinidad and Tobago
0

			1	2	3
1	(Jamaica) (Trinidad and Tobago)	Adeola Greatorex; Charlotte Ready	6; 1	6; 3
2	(Jamaica) (Trinidad and Tobago)	Najah Dawson; Jordane Dookie	6; 3	6; 2
3	(Jamaica) (Trinidad and Tobago)	Holly Reid / Katherine Dibbs; Jordane Dookie / Anneliese Rose	1; 6	6; 3	10; 6

Jamaica
1
Santa Tecla, El Salvador
20 August 2025
Hard

Bahamas
2

			1	2	3
1	(Jamaica) (The Bahamas)	Adeola Greatorex; Simone Pratt	0; 6	0; 6
2	(Jamaica) (The Bahamas)	Najah Dawson; Sydney-Nicole Clarke	6; 2	6; 4
3	(Jamaica) (The Bahamas)	Najah Dawson / Holly Reid; Sydney-Nicole Clarke / Simone Pratt	6^{5} 7^{7}	5; 7

Trinidad and Tobago
2
Santa Tecla, El Salvador
20 August 2025
Hard

Suriname
1

			1	2	3
1	(Trinidad and Tobago) (Suriname)	Charlotte Ready; Kayla Currie	6; 2	6; 3
2	(Trinidad and Tobago) (Suriname)	Jordane Dookie; Anouk Ma-Ajong	6; 1	6; 3
3	(Trinidad and Tobago) (Suriname)	Charlotte Ready / Jaeda-Lee Daniel-Joseph; Faith Bab / Anouk Ma-Ajong	6^{4} 7^{7}	6^{4} 7^{7}

=== Pool C ===
#	Team	P	W	L	Matches W-L	Sets W-L
1	El Salvador	3	3	0	8–1	16–2
2	Cuba	3	2	1	7–2	14–6
3	U.S. Virgin Islands	3	1	3	2–7	5–15
4	Antigua and Barbuda	3	0	3	1–8	4–16

El Salvador
3
Santa Tecla, El Salvador
18 August 2025
Hard

Antigua and Barbuda
0

			1	2	3
1	(El Salvador) (Antigua and Barbuda)	Susana Souhrada; Janae George	6; 0	6; 0
2	(El Salvador) (Antigua and Barbuda)	Sara Cruz Bonilla; Ariel Naomi Kelsick	6; 2	6; 1
3	(El Salvador) (Antigua and Barbuda)	Michelle Irigoyen / Daniela Aguilar; Isoke Perry / Jolie George-Alexander	6; 0	6; 0

Cuba
3
Santa Tecla, El Salvador
18 August 2025
Hard

U.S. Virgin Islands
0

			1	2	3
1	(Cuba) (United States Virgin Islands)	Isid Hernández; Malena del Olmo	6; 2	6^{5} 7^{7}	4; 0	retired
2	(Cuba) (United States Virgin Islands)	Roxana Valdez; Lisa Messier	6; 0	6; 2
3	(Cuba) (United States Virgin Islands)	Roxana Valdez / Isid Hernández; Malena del Olmo / Lisa Messier	6; 2	7; 5

Cuba
3
Santa Tecla, El Salvador
19 August 2025
Hard

Antigua and Barbuda
0

			1	2	3
1	(Cuba) (Antigua and Barbuda)	Isid Hernández; Isoke Perry	6; 0	6; 1
2	(Cuba) (Antigua and Barbuda)	Roxana Valdez; Jolie George-Alexander	6; 2	6; 0
3	(Cuba) (Antigua and Barbuda)	María Eduarda Pérez Acosta / Meliza Pérez; Ariel Naomi Kelsick / Janae George	6^{5} 7^{7}	6; 4	10; 8

El Salvador
3
Santa Tecla, El Salvador
19 August 2025
Hard

U.S. Virgin Islands
0

			1	2	3
1	(El Salvador) (United States Virgin Islands)	Susana Souhrada; Loriann Laugle	6; 0	6; 0
2	(El Salvador) (United States Virgin Islands)	Sara Cruz Bonilla; Lisa Messier	6; 1	6; 3
3	(El Salvador) (United States Virgin Islands)	Michelle Irigoyen / Susana Souhrada; Lisa Messier / Loriann Laugle	5; 0			retired

Cuba
1
Santa Tecla, El Salvador
20 August 2025
Hard

El Salvador
2

			1	2	3
1	(Cuba) (El Salvador)	Isid Hernández; Susana Souhrada	2; 6	4; 6
2	(Cuba) (El Salvador)	Roxana Valdez; Sara Cruz Bonilla	5; 7	0; 6
3	(Cuba) (El Salvador)	Roxana Valdez / Isid Hernández; Sienna Poma / Daniela Aguilar	6; 2	6; 0

Antigua and Barbuda
1
Santa Tecla, El Salvador
20 August 2025
Hard

U.S. Virgin Islands
2

			1	2	3
1	(Antigua and Barbuda) (United States Virgin Islands)	Isoke Perry; Stefani Catazano	6; 2	6; 3
2	(Antigua and Barbuda) (United States Virgin Islands)	Ariel Naomi Kelsick; Malena del Olmo	6; 2	2; 6	1; 6
3	(Antigua and Barbuda) (United States Virgin Islands)	Janae George / Jolie George-Alexander; Malena del Olmo / Lisa Messier	1; 6	1; 6

=== Promotion Play-Offs ===
#	Team	P	W	L	Matches W-L	Sets W-L
1	Bahamas	2	2	0	4–2	9–6
2	Uruguay	2	1	1	3–3	7–7
3	El Salvador	2	0	2	2–4	6–9

El Salvador
1
Santa Tecla, El Salvador
21 August 2025
Hard

Bahamas
2

			1	2	3
1	(El Salvador) (The Bahamas)	Susana Souhrada; Simone Pratt	4; 6	6; 1	6; 0
2	(El Salvador) (The Bahamas)	Sara Cruz Bonilla; Sydney-Nicole Clarke	5; 7	6; 4	3; 6
3	(El Salvador) (The Bahamas)	Sara Cruz Bonilla / Susana Souhrada; Sydney-Nicole Clarke / Simone Pratt	1; 6	3; 6

Uruguay
1
Santa Tecla, El Salvador
22 August 2025
Hard

Bahamas
2

			1	2	3
1	(Uruguay) (The Bahamas)	Josefina Soldo; Simone Pratt	7^{8} 6^{6}	6^{5} 7^{7}	1; 6
2	(Uruguay) (The Bahamas)	Juliana Rodríguez; Sydney-Nicole Clarke	3; 6	0; 6
3	(Uruguay) (The Bahamas)	Juliana Rodríguez / Sofía Barbosa Pérez; Jalisa Victoria Clarke / Saphirre Ferguson	6; 3	6; 0

Uruguay
2
Santa Tecla, El Salvador
23 August 2025
Hard

El Salvador
1

			1	2	3
1	(Uruguay) (El Salvador)	Sofía Barbosa Pérez; Susana Souhrada	1; 6	6; 4	6; 2
2	(Uruguay) (El Salvador)	Juliana Rodríguez; Sara Valentina Cruz Bonilla	6^{3} 7^{7}	3; 6
3	(Uruguay) (El Salvador)	Juliana Rodríguez / Sofía Barbosa Pérez; Michelle Irigoyen / Sara Valentina Cruz Bonilla	7^{7} 6^{2}	6; 3

=== 4th to 6th Play-off ===
#	Team	P	W	L	Matches W-L	Sets W-L
4	Cuba	2	2	0	4–2	9–4
5	Jamaica	2	1	1	3–3	6–6
6	Saint Lucia	2	0	2	2–4	4–9

Cuba
2
Santa Tecla, El Salvador
21 August 2025
Hard

Saint Lucia
1

			1	2	3
1	(Cuba) (Saint Lucia)	Isid Hernández; Julia Natasha Anastasia D'Auvergne	6; 3	6; 0
2	(Cuba) (Saint Lucia)	Roxana Valdez; Jessica Eudovic	5; 7	6; 2	1; 6
3	(Cuba) (Saint Lucia)	Roxana Valdez / Isid Hernández; Jessica Eudovic / Stacey Roheman	7; 5	6; 2

Jamaica
2
Santa Tecla, El Salvador
22 August 2025
Hard

Saint Lucia
1

			1	2	3
1	(Jamaica) (Saint Lucia)	Adeola Greatorex; Jaelyn Henry	6; 0	6; 2
2	(Jamaica) (Saint Lucia)	Katherine Dibbs; Jessica Eudovic	3; 6	2; 6
3	(Jamaica) (Saint Lucia)	Holly Reid / Katherine Dibbs; Julia Natasha Anastasia D'Auvergne / Jessica Eudovic	7; 5	6; 3

Jamaica
1
Santa Tecla, El Salvador
22 August 2025
Hard

Cuba
2

			1	2	3
1	(Jamaica) (Cuba)	Katherine Dibbs; Isid Hernández	2; 6	3; 6
2	(Jamaica) (Cuba)	Adeola Greatorex; Roxana Valdez	6; 2	6; 4
3	(Jamaica) (Cuba)	Holly Reid / Katherine Dibbs; Isid Hernández / Roxana Valdez	6^{5} 7^{7}	4; 6

=== 7th to 9th Play off ===
#	Team	P	W	L	Matches W-L	Sets W-L
7	Trinidad and Tobago	2	2	0	4–2	8–4
8	Panama	2	1	1	4–2	8–4
9	U.S. Virgin Islands	2	0	2	1–5	2–10

Panama
3
Santa Tecla, El Salvador
21 August 2025
Hard

U.S. Virgin Islands
0

			1	2	3
1	(Panama) (United States Virgin Islands)	Michelle Agelvis; Loriann Laugle	6; 0	6; 1
2	(Panama) (United States Virgin Islands)	Anna Louise Bjørnestad; Malena del Olmo	7^{9} 6^{7}	6; 3
3	(Panama) (United States Virgin Islands)	Karla Ching / Michelle Agelvis; Stefani Catazano / Loriann Laugle	6; 2	6; 0

Trinidad and Tobago
2
Santa Tecla, El Salvador
22 August 2025
Hard

U.S. Virgin Islands
1

			1	2	3
1	(Trinidad and Tobago) (United States Virgin Islands)	Jaeda-Lee Daniel-Joseph; Loriann Laugle	1; 6	5; 7
2	(Trinidad and Tobago) (United States Virgin Islands)	Jordane Dookie; Malena del Olmo	6; 3	0; 0		retired
3	(Trinidad and Tobago) (United States Virgin Islands)	Anneliese Rose / Jordane Dookie; Malena del Olmo / Lisa Messier	6; 2	6; 3

Trinidad and Tobago
2
Santa Tecla, El Salvador
23 August 2025
Hard

Panama
1

			1	2	3
1	(Trinidad and Tobago) (Panama)	Charlotte Ready; Michelle Agelvis	0; 6	0; 6
2	(Trinidad and Tobago) (Panama)	Jordane Dookie; Anna Louise Bjørnestad	6; 2	6; 0
3	(Trinidad and Tobago) (Panama)	Jordane Dookie / Anneliese Rose; Michelle Agelvis / Karla Ching	6; 3	6; 3

=== 10th to 11th Play-off ===
Antigua and Barbuda
1
Santa Tecla, El Salvador
21 August 2025
Hard

Suriname
2

			1	2	3
1	(Antigua and Barbuda) (Suriname)	Isoke Perry; Jill Ma-Ajong	3; 6	3; 6
2	(Antigua and Barbuda) (Suriname)	Jolie George-Alexander; Faith Bab	6; 1	6; 0
3	(Antigua and Barbuda) (Suriname)	Jolie George-Alexander / Ariel Naomi Kelsick; Kayla Currie / Anouk Ma-Ajong	1; 6	3; 6

=== Promotions ===
- Bahamas and Uruguay were promoted to Americas Zone Group II in 2026.
