= 2015 Fed Cup Americas Zone Group I – play-offs =

International tennis competition play-offs

The play-offs of the 2015 Fed Cup Americas Zone Group I were the final stages of the Group I Zonal Competition involving teams from the Americas. Using the positions determined in their pools, the seven teams faced off to determine their placing in the 2015 Fed Cup Americas Zone Group I. The winner of the promotion play-off advanced to World Group II play-offs, and the losers of the relegation play-off were relegated down to the Americas Zone Group II.

== Pool results ==
| Placing | Pool A | Pool B |
|---|---|---|
| 1 | Brazil | Paraguay |
| 2 | —N/a | Mexico |
| 3 | Colombia | Venezuela |
| 4 | Chile | Bolivia |

== Promotion play-off ==
The first placed teams of the two pools were drawn in head-to-head rounds. The winner advanced to the World Group II play-offs.

=== Brazil vs. Paraguay ===
Brazil
1
La Loma Sports Centre, San Luis Potosí, Mexico
7 February 2014
Hard

Paraguay
2

| | | | 1 | 2 | 3 |
|---|---|---|---|---|---|
| 1 | (Brazil) (Paraguay) | Paula Cristina Gonçalves; Montserrat González | 6; 0 | 6; 3 |
| 2 | (Brazil) (Paraguay) | Beatriz Haddad Maia; Verónica Cepede Royg | 4; 6 | 6^{4} 7^{7} |
| 3 | (Brazil) (Paraguay) | Paula Cristina Gonçalves / Teliana Pereira; Verónica Cepede Royg / Montserrat González | 3; 6 | 3; 6 |

== Relegation play-offs ==
The bottom two teams of the two pools were drawn in head-to-head. The loser was relegated down to Americas Zone Group II in 2016.

=== Colombia vs. Venezuela ===
Colombia
2
La Loma Sports Centre, San Luis Potosí, Mexico
7 February 2014
Hard

Venezuela
0

| | | | 1 | 2 | 3 |
|---|---|---|---|---|---|---|
| 1 | (Colombia) (Venezuela) | Yuliana Lizarazo; Aymet Uzcátegui | 6; 1 | 6; 1 |
| 2 | (Colombia) (Venezuela) | Mariana Duque; Adriana Pérez | 6; 4 | 6; 0 |
| 3 | (Colombia) (Venezuela) | Mariana Duque / Yuliana Lizarazo; Adriana Pérez / Aymet Uzcátegui | | | | not played |

=== Chile vs. Bolivia ===
Chile
0
La Loma Sports Centre, San Luis Potosí, Mexico
7 February 2014
Hard

Bolivia
2

| | | | 1 | 2 | 3 |
|---|---|---|---|---|---|---|
| 1 | (Chile) (Bolivia) | Fernanda Brito; Noelia Zeballos | 4; 6 | 4; 6 |
| 2 | (Chile) (Bolivia) | Daniela Seguel; María Fernanda Álvarez Terán | 1; 6 | 1; 6 |
| 3 | (Chile) (Bolivia) | Fernanda Brito / Daniela Seguel; María Fernanda Álvarez Terán / Noelia Zeballos | | | | not played |

== Final placements ==
| Placing | Teams |
| Promoted | Paraguay |
| Second | Brazil |
| Third | Mexico |
| Fourth | Colombia / Bolivia |
| Relegated | Chile / Venezuela |

- Paraguay advanced to World Group II play-offs.
- Chile and Venezuela were relegated to Americas Zone Group II in 2016.
