= 2015 Fed Cup Americas Zone Group I – Pool A =

Pool A of the 2015 Fed Cup Americas Group I was one of two pools in the Americas Group I of the 2015 Fed Cup. Three teams competed in a round robin competition, with the top team and the bottom two teams proceeding to their respective sections of the play-offs: the top team played for advancement to the World Group II Play-offs, while the bottom team faced potential relegation to Group II.

== Standings ==
| | | (Brazil) BRA | (Colombia) COL | (Chile) CHI | RR; W–L | Set; W–L | Game; W–L | Standings |
| 19 | Brazil | | 2–1 | 3–0 | 5–1 | 10–1 | 72–44 | 1 |
| 30 | Colombia | 1–2 | | 2–1 | 3–3 | 6–9 | 79–79 | 2 |
| 41 | Chile | 0–3 | 1–2 | | 1–5 | 4–10 | 49–77 | 3 |

== Round-robin ==
=== Colombia vs. Chile ===
Colombia
2
La Loma Sports Centre, San Luis Potosí, Mexico
4 February 2015
Hard

Chile
1

| | | | 1 | 2 | 3 |
|---|---|---|---|---|---|
| 1 | (Colombia) (Chile) | Yuliana Lizarazo; Daniela Seguel | 2; 6 | 6; 3 | 5; 7 |
| 2 | (Colombia) (Chile) | Mariana Duque Mariño; Andrea Koch Benvenuto | 3; 6 | 6; 4 | 6; 1 |
| 3 | (Colombia) (Chile) | Mariana Duque Mariño / Yuliana Lizarazo; Fernanda Brito / Daniela Seguel | 6; 3 | 6^{5} 7^{7} | 6; 1 |

=== Brazil vs. Chile ===
Brazil
3
La Loma Sports Centre, San Luis Potosí, Mexico
5 February 2015
Hard

Chile
0

| | | | 1 | 2 | 3 |
|---|---|---|---|---|---|---|
| 1 | (Brazil) (Chile) | Paula Cristina Gonçalves; Daniela Seguel | 6; 2 | 7^{12} 6^{10} |
| 2 | (Brazil) (Chile) | Beatriz Haddad Maia; Andrea Koch Benvenuto | 6; 1 | | | retired |
| 3 | (Brazil) (Chile) | Gabriela Cé / Beatriz Haddad Maia; Fernanda Brito / Bárbara Gatica | 6; 0 | 6; 2 |

=== Brazil vs. Colombia ===
Brazil
2
La Loma Sports Centre, San Luis Potosí, Mexico
6 February 2015
Hard

Colombia
1

| | | | 1 | 2 | 3 |
|---|---|---|---|---|---|---|
| 1 | (Brazil) (Colombia) | Paula Cristina Gonçalves; Yuliana Lizarazo | 7^{7} 6^{3} | 4; 6 | 6; 2 |
| 2 | (Brazil) (Colombia) | Beatriz Haddad Maia; Mariana Duque Mariño | 7^{8} 6^{6} | 7; 5 |
| 3 | (Brazil) (Colombia) | Gabriela Cé / Beatriz Haddad Maia; María Fernanda Herazo / María Paulina Pérez | 6; 3 | 4; 5 | | retired |
