= 1995 Fed Cup =

International women's tennis competition

Details
- Duration: 21 April – 26 November
- Edition: 33rd

Achievements (singles)

The 1995 Fed Cup was the 33rd edition of the most important competition between national teams in women's tennis, and the first to bear the name Fed Cup.

Major changes to the tournament's structure went into effect for 1995. The format was changed to a multi-tiered league system similar to the Davis Cup, and a Group II was added to the existing Group I at Zonal level. The World Group I was reduced to eight teams and the World Group II was added with another eight teams.

Ties were played at home sites rather than all in one location as before. Play-offs determined promotion and relegation between World Group and World Group II and Zonal Group I. Two singles rubbers were added to the ties, which became the best of five matches.

The final took place on 25–26 November, with Spain defeating the United States to give Spain their 4th overall and 3rd consecutive title.

== World Group ==
Participating teams
| Austria | Bulgaria | France | Germany |
| Japan | South Africa | Spain | United States |

=== Draw ===
Quarterfinals; 21–23 April
Sofia, Bulgaria (Indoor carpet)
1 | Spain | 3
Bulgaria | 2
Freiburg, Germany (Outdoor clay)
Japan | 1
4 | Germany | 4
Metz, France (Outdoor clay)
3 | France | 3
South Africa | 2
Aventura, FL, United States (Outdoor hard)
Austria | 0
2 | United States | 5

Semifinals; 22–23 July
Santander, Spain (Outdoor clay)
1 | Spain | 3
4 | Germany | 2
Wilmington, NC, United States (Indoor carpet)
3 | France | 2
2 | United States | 3

Final; 25–26 November
Valencia, Spain (Outdoor clay)
1 | Spain | 3
2 | United States | 2

== World Group play-offs ==
The four losing teams in the World Group first round ties (Austria, Bulgaria, Japan and South Africa), and four winners of the World Group II ties (Argentina, Australia, Canada and Netherlands) entered the draw for the World Group play-offs.

Date: 22–23 July

| Venue | Surface | Home team | Score | Visiting team |
|---|---|---|---|---|
| San Miguel, Argentina | Outdoor clay | Argentina | 5–0 | Australia |
| Bloemfontein, South Africa | Outdoor hard | South Africa | 5–0 | Bulgaria |
| Gifu, Japan | Indoor carpet | Japan | 5–0 | Canada |
| Noordwijk, Netherlands | Outdoor carpet | Netherlands | 1–4 | Austria |

== World Group II ==
The World Group II was the second highest level of Fed Cup competition in 1995. Winners advanced to the World Group play-offs, and loser played in the World Group II play-offs.

Date: 22–23 April

| Venue | Surface | Home team | Score | Visiting team |
|---|---|---|---|---|
| Jakarta, Indonesia | Outdoor hard | Indonesia | 2–3 | Argentina |
| Perth, Australia | Outdoor grass | Australia | 3–2 | Slovakia |
| Ancona, Italy | Outdoor clay | Italy | 2–3 | Canada |
| Västerås, Sweden | Indoor carpet | Sweden | 0–5 | Netherlands |

== World Group II play-offs ==
The four losing teams from World Group II (Indonesia, Italy, Slovakia and Sweden) played off against qualifiers from Zonal Group I. Two teams qualified from Europe/Africa Zone (Belgium and Czech Republic), one team from the Asia/Oceania Zone (South Korea), and one team from the Americas Zone (Paraguay).

Date: 22–23 July

| Venue | Surface | Home team | Score | Visiting team |
|---|---|---|---|---|
| Ostend, Belgium | Outdoor clay | Belgium | 3–2 | South Korea |
| Prague, Czech Republic | Indoor carpet | Czech Republic | 4–1 | Sweden |
| Salerno, Italy | Outdoor clay | Italy | 2–3 | Indonesia |
| Asunción, Paraguay | Outdoor clay | Paraguay | 0–5 | Slovakia |

== Americas Zone ==
- Nations in **bold** advanced to the higher level of competition.
- Nations in italics were relegated down to a lower level of competition.

=== Group I ===
Venue: Caracos Sports Club, Caracas, Venezuela (outdoor hard)

Dates: 11–15 April

Participating teams

- Brazil
- Chile
- Colombia
- Cuba
- Mexico
- **Paraguay**
- Peru
- Venezuela

=== Group II ===
Venue: Trinidad C.C., Maraval, Port of Spain, Trinidad and Tobago (outdoor hard)

Dates: 27–30 March

Participating teams

- Bahamas
- Barbados
- Bolivia
- Costa Rica
- Dominican Republic
- Ecuador
- El Salvador
- Guatemala
- Jamaica
- **Puerto Rico**
- Trinidad and Tobago
- **Uruguay**

== Asia/Oceania Zone ==
- Nations in **bold** advanced to the higher level of competition.
- Nations in italics were relegated down to a lower level of competition.

=== Group I ===
Venue: Jang Choong Tennis Centre, Jung-gu, South Korea (outdoor clay)

Dates: 18–22 April

Participating teams

- China
- Chinese Taipei
- Hong Kong
- Kazakhstan
- New Zealand
- Philippines
- **South Korea**
- Thailand

=== Group II ===
Venue: Maharashtra L.T.A., Mumbai, India (outdoor clay)

Dates: 8–11 March

Participating teams

- **India**
- **Malaysia**
- Pacific Oceania
- Singapore
- Sri Lanka
- Syria
- Uzbekistan

== Europe/Africa Zone ==
- Nations in **bold** advanced to the higher level of competition.
- Nations in italics were relegated down to a lower level of competition.

=== Group I ===
Venue: La Manga Club, Murcia, Spain (outdoor clay)

Dates: 17–21 April

Participating teams

- Belarus
- **Belgium**
- Croatia
- **Czech Republic**
- Finland
- Georgia
- Great Britain
- Hungary
- Israel
- Latvia
- Poland
- Romania
- Russia
- Slovenia
- Switzerland
- Ukraine

=== Group II ===
Venue: Nairobi Club, Nairobi, Kenya (outdoor clay)

Dates: 8–13 May

Participating teams

- Botswana
- Cyprus
- Denmark
- Egypt
- Estonia
- **Greece**
- Ireland
- Kenya
- Lithuania
- Luxembourg
- Macedonia
- Malta
- Morocco
- **Norway**
- **Portugal**
- Senegal
- Tunisia
- Turkey
- **FR Yugoslavia**
- Zimbabwe
