= 2015 Fed Cup =

International women's tennis competition

Details
- Duration: 7 February – 15 November
- Edition: 53rd

Achievements (singles)

The 2015 Fed Cup (also known as the 2015 Fed Cup by BNP Paribas for sponsorship purposes) was the 53rd edition of the most important tournament between national teams in women's tennis. The final took place on 14–15 November and was won by the Czech Republic for the second year in a row, and for the fourth time in five years.

Mozambique made its first appearance in the tournament.

== World Group ==
Participating teams
Australia	Canada	Czech Republic	Germany
France	Italy	Poland	Russia

=== Seeds ===
1. Czech Republic (champions)
2. Germany (semifinals)
3. Italy (first round)
4. Russia (final)

=== Draw ===
Quarterfinals; 7–8 February
Quebec City, Canada (indoor hard)
1	Czech Republic	4
Canada	0
Genoa, Italy (indoor clay)
France	3
3	Italy	2
Kraków, Poland (indoor hard)
4	Russia	4
Poland	0
Stuttgart, Germany (indoor hard)
Australia	1
2	Germany	4

Semifinals; 18–19 April
Ostrava, Czech Republic (indoor hard)
1	Czech Republic	3
France	1
Sochi, Russia (indoor clay)
4	Russia	3
2	Germany	2

Final; 14–15 November
Prague, Czech Republic
1	Czech Republic	3
4	Russia	2

=== Final ===
==== Czech Republic vs Russia ====
Czech Republic
3
O2 Arena, Prague, Czech Republic
14–15 November 2015
Novacrylic ultracushion hard (indoors)

Russia
2

			1	2	3
1	(Czech Republic) (Russia)	Petra Kvitová; Anastasia Pavlyuchenkova	2; 6	6; 1	6; 1
2	(Czech Republic) (Russia)	Karolína Plíšková; Maria Sharapova	3; 6	4; 6
3	(Czech Republic) (Russia)	Petra Kvitová; Maria Sharapova	6; 3	4; 6	2; 6
4	(Czech Republic) (Russia)	Karolína Plíšková; Anastasia Pavlyuchenkova	6; 3	6; 4
5	(Czech Republic) (Russia)	Karolína Plíšková / Barbora Strýcová; Anastasia Pavlyuchenkova / Elena Vesnina	4; 6	6; 3	6; 2

== World Group play-offs ==
The four losing teams in the World Group first round ties, and four winners of the World Group II ties entered the draw for the World Group play-offs. Four seeded teams, based on the latest Fed Cup ranking, were drawn against four unseeded teams.

Date: 18–19 April

Venue	Surface	Home team	Score	Visiting team
Brindisi, Italy	Clay	Italy (1)	3–2	United States
's-Hertogenbosch, Netherlands	Clay (i)	Netherlands	4–1	Australia (2)
Zielona Góra, Poland	Hard (i)	Poland (3)	2–3	Switzerland
Montreal, Canada	Hard (i)	Canada (4)	2–3	Romania

- Italy remained in the World Group in 2016.
- Netherlands, Romania, and Switzerland were promoted to the World Group in 2016.
- United States remained in World Group II in 2016.
- Australia, Canada, and Poland were relegated to World Group II in 2016.

== World Group II ==
The World Group II was the second highest level of Fed Cup competition in 2015. Winners advanced to the World Group play-offs, and losers played in the World Group II play-offs.

=== Seeds ===
1. Slovakia (World Group II play-off)
2. Argentina (World Group II play-off)
3. Spain (World Group II play-off)
4. Switzerland (World Group play-off)

Date: 7–8 February

Venue	Surface	Home team	Score	Visiting team
Apeldoorn, Netherlands	Clay (i)	Netherlands	4–1	Slovakia (1)
Galați, Romania	Hard (i)	Romania	3–2	Spain (3)
Helsingborg, Sweden	Hard (i)	Sweden	1–3	Switzerland (4)
Buenos Aires, Argentina	Clay	Argentina (2)	1–4	United States

== World Group II play-offs ==
The four losing teams from World Group II played off against qualifiers from Zonal Group I. Two teams qualified from Europe/Africa Zone, one team from the Asia/Oceania Zone, and one team from the Americas Zone.

Date: 18–19 April

Venue	Surface	Home team	Score	Visiting team
Novi Sad, Serbia	Hard (i)	Serbia (1)	4–1	Paraguay
Bratislava, Slovakia	Clay (i)	Slovakia (2)	4–0	Sweden
Tokyo, Japan	Hard (i)	Japan (3)	2–3	Belarus
Buenos Aires, Argentina	Clay	Argentina	0–4	Spain (4)

- Slovakia and Spain remained in World Group II in 2016.
- Belarus and Serbia were promoted to World Group II in 2016.
- Japan and Paraguay remained in Zonal Group I in 2016.
- Argentina and Sweden were relegated to Zonal Group I in 2016.

== Americas Zone ==
=== Group I ===
Venue: La Loma Sports Centre, San Luis Potosí, Mexico (outdoor hard)

Dates: 4–7 February

Participating teams

Pool A

- Brazil
- Chile
- Colombia

Pool B

- Bolivia
- Mexico
- Paraguay
- Venezuela

==== Play-offs ====
- Paraguay advanced to World Group II play-offs
- Chile and Venezuela were relegated to Americas Zone Group II in 2016

=== Group II ===
Venue: Centro Nacional de Tenis, Santo Domingo Este, Dominican Republic (outdoor hard)
Dates: 24–27 June

Participating teams

Pool A

- Barbados
- Ecuador
- Uruguay

Pool B

- Bahamas
- Costa Rica
- Trinidad and Tobago

Pool C

- Dominican Republic
- Honduras
- Peru

Pool D

- Bermuda
- Guatemala
- Puerto Rico

Withdrawn

- Panama

Inactive teams

- Antigua and Barbuda
- Cuba
- El Salvador
- Eastern Caribbean
- Haiti
- Jamaica

==== Play-offs ====
- Ecuador and Peru were promoted to Americas Zone Group I in 2016.

== Asia/Oceania Zone ==
=== Group I ===
Venue: Guangdong Olympic Tennis Centre, Guangzhou, China (outdoor hard)

Dates: 4–7 February

Participating teams

Pool A

- Hong Kong
- Japan
- South Korea
- Uzbekistan

Pool B

- China
- Chinese Taipei
- Kazakhstan
- Thailand

==== Play-offs ====
- Japan advanced to World Group II play-offs
- Hong Kong was relegated to Asia/Oceania Zone Group II in 2016

=== Group II ===
Venue: SAAP Tennis Complex, Hyderabad, India (outdoor hard)

Dates: 14–18 April

Participating teams

Pool A

- Philippines
- Singapore

Pool B

- Turkmenistan
- Kyrgyzstan
- Iran

Pool C

- India
- Malaysia
- Pakistan

Pool D

- Indonesia
- Sri Lanka
- Pacific Oceania

Withdrawn

- Iraq
- New Zealand
- Vietnam

Inactive teams

- Brunei
- Jordan
- Lebanon
- Oman
- Syria
- Tajikistan

==== Play-offs ====
- India was promoted to Asia/Oceania Zone Group I in 2016.

== Europe/Africa Zone ==
=== Group I ===
Venue: Syma Sport and Events Centre, Budapest, Hungary (indoor hard)

Dates: 4–7 February

Participating teams

==== Pool A ====
- Austria
- Hungary
- Serbia

==== Pool B ====
- Great Britain
- Liechtenstein
- Turkey
- Ukraine

==== Pool C ====
- Belarus
- Bulgaria
- Georgia
- Portugal

==== Pool D ====
- Belgium
- Croatia
- Israel
- Latvia

==== Play-offs ====
- Belarus and Serbia advanced to World Group II play-offs
- Austria and Liechtenstein were relegated to Europe/Africa Zone Group II in 2016

=== Group II ===
Venue: Tere Tenniscentre, Tallinn, Estonia (indoor hard)

Dates: 4–7 February

Participating teams

Pool A

- Bosnia and Herzegovina
- Estonia
- Egypt
- South Africa

Pool B

- Finland
- Ireland
- Luxembourg
- Slovenia

==== Play-offs ====
- Estonia and South Africa were promoted to Europe/Africa Zone Group I in 2016
- Ireland and Luxembourg were relegated to Europe/Africa Zone Group III in 2016

=== Group III ===
Venue: Bellevue, Ulcinj, Montenegro (outdoor clay)

Dates: 13–18 April

Participating teams

==== Pool A ====
- Lithuania
- Cyprus
- Iceland

==== Pool B ====
- Montenegro
- Greece
- Armenia

==== Pool C ====
- Denmark
- Norway
- Algeria

==== Pool D ====
- Moldova
- Namibia
- Macedonia
- Mozambique

Withdrawn

- Madagascar
- Malta

Inactive teams

- Azerbaijan
- Botswana
- Cameroon
- Congo
- Ethiopia
- Kenya
- Lesotho
- Morocco
- Mauritius
- San Marino
- Senegal
- Tunisia
- Zimbabwe

==== Play-offs ====
- Lithuania and Denmark were promoted to Europe/Africa Zone Group II in 2016
