= 2009 Fed Cup =

International women's tennis competition

Details
- Duration: 7 February – 8 November
- Edition: 47th

Achievements (singles)

The 2009 Fed Cup was the 46th edition of the most important competition between national teams in women's tennis.

The final took place at the Circolo del Tennis in Reggio Calabria, Italy, on 7–8 November. The home team, Italy, defeated the United States, 4–0, giving Italy their second title.

== World Group ==
Participating teams
Argentina	China	Czech Republic	France
Italy	Russia	Spain	United States

=== Draw ===
Quarterfinals; 7–8 February
Moscow, Russia (Indoor hard)
1	Russia	5
China	0
Orléans, France (Indoor hard)
France	0
4	Italy	5
Surprise, AZ, United States (Outdoor hard)
3	United States	3
Argentina	2
Brno, Czech Republic (Indoor carpet)
Czech Republic	4
2	Spain	1

Semifinals; 25–26 April
Castellaneta, Italy (Outdoor clay)
1	Russia	1
4	Italy	4
Brno, Czech Republic (Indoor hard)
3	United States	3
Czech Republic	2

Final; 7–8 November
Reggio Calabria, Italy (Outdoor clay)
4	Italy	4
3	United States	0

== World Group play-offs ==
The four losing teams in the World Group first round ties (China, France, Argentina and Spain), and four winners of the World Group II ties (Slovakia, Germany, Serbia and Ukraine) entered the draw for the World Group play-offs. Four seeded teams, based on the latest Fed Cup ranking, were drawn against four unseeded teams.

Date: 25–26 April

Venue	Surface	Home team	Score	Visiting team
Lleida, Spain	Outdoor clay	Spain (1)	0–4	Serbia
Limoges, France	Indoor clay	France (2)	3–2	Slovakia
Frankfurt, Germany	Outdoor clay	Germany	3–2	China (3)
Mar del Plata, Argentina	Outdoor clay	Argentina (4)	0–5	Ukraine

== World Group II ==
The World Group II was the second highest level of Fed Cup competition in 2009. Winners advanced to the World Group play-offs, and losers played in the World Group II play-offs.

Date: 7–8 February

Venue	Surface	Home team	Score	Visiting team
Bratislava, Slovakia	Indoor hard	Slovakia	4–1	Belgium (1)
Zürich, Switzerland	Indoor hard	Switzerland	2–3	Germany (4)
Belgrade, Serbia	Indoor hard	Serbia	4–1	Japan (3)
Kharkiv, Ukraine	Indoor hard	Ukraine	3–2	Israel (2)

== World Group II play-offs ==
The four losing teams from World Group II (Belgium, Switzerland, Japan, and Israel) played off against qualifiers from Zonal Group I. Two teams qualified from Europe/Africa Zone (Estonia and Poland), one team from the Asia/Oceania Zone (Australia), and one team from the Americas Zone (Canada).

Date: 25–26 April

Venue	Surface	Home team	Score	Visiting team
Hasselt, Belgium	Indoor clay	Belgium (1)	3–2	Canada
Tallinn, Estonia	Indoor hard	Estonia	3–2	Israel (2)
Gdynia, Poland	Outdoor clay	Poland	3–2	Japan (3)
Mildura, Australia	Outdoor grass	Australia (4)	3–1	Switzerland

== Americas Zone ==
- Nations in **bold** advanced to the higher level of competition.
- Nations in italics were relegated down to a lower level of competition.

=== Group I ===
Venue: Uniprix Stadium, Montreal, Canada (indoor hard)

Dates: 4–7 February

Participating teams

- Bahamas
- Brazil
- **Canada**
- Colombia
- Paraguay
- Puerto Rico

=== Group II ===
Venue: Parque del Este, Santo Domingo, Dominican Republic (outdoor hard)

Dates: 21–25 April

Participating teams

- Bolivia
- **Chile**
- **Cuba**
- Dominican Republic
- Guatemala
- Mexico
- Panama
- Peru
- Trinidad and Tobago

== Asia/Oceania Zone ==
- Nations in **bold** advanced to the higher level of competition.
- Nations in italics were relegated down to a lower level of competition.

=== Group I ===
Venue: State Tennis Centre, Perth, Australia (outdoor hard)

Dates: 4–7 February

Participating teams

- **Australia**
- Chinese Taipei
- India
- Indonesia
- New Zealand
- South Korea
- Thailand
- Uzbekistan

=== Group II ===
Venue: State Tennis Centre, Perth, Australia (outdoor hard)

Dates: 4–6 February

Participating teams

- **Kazakhstan**
- Hong Kong
- Singapore
- Iran

== Europe/Africa Zone ==
- Nations in **bold** advanced to the higher level of competition.
- Nations in italics were relegated down to a lower level of competition.

=== Group I ===
Venue: Coral Tennis Club, Tallinn, Estonia (indoor hard)

Dates: 4–7 February

Participating teams

- Austria
- Belarus
- Bosnia and Herzegovina
- Bulgaria
- Croatia
- Denmark
- **Estonia**
- Great Britain
- Hungary
- Netherlands
- Luxembourg
- **Poland**
- Romania
- Slovenia
- Sweden

=== Group II ===
Venue: Attaleya Shine Tennis Club, Antalya, Turkey (outdoor hard)

Dates: 21–25 April

Participating teams

- Georgia
- **Latvia**
- Morocco
- **Portugal**
- South Africa
- Turkey

=== Group III ===
Venue: Marsa Sports Club, Marsa, Malta (outdoor hard)

Dates: 21–25 April

Participating teams

- Algeria
- **Armenia**
- Egypt
- Finland
- **Greece**
- Iceland
- Ireland
- Liechtenstein
- Malta
- Moldova
- Norway

== Rankings ==
The rankings were measured after the three points during the year that play took place, and were collated by combining points earned from the previous four years.

9 February
Rank	Nation	Points	Move
1	Russia	38,932.5	Steady
2	Italy	21,740.0	Steady
3	Spain	11,905.0	Steady
4	United States	10,390.0	Steady
5	Czech Republic	8,730.0	▲3
6	France	6,820.0	▼1
7	China	6,520.0	▼1
8	Belgium	5,745.0	▼1
9	Argentina	4,757.5	Steady
10	Germany	4,550.0	▲2

27 April
Rank	Nation	Points	Move
1	Russia	33,772.5	Steady
2	Italy	23,800.0	Steady
3	United States	16,570.0	▲1
4	Spain	9,842.5	▼1
5	Czech Republic	8,192.5	Steady
6	France	6,312.5	Steady
7	Ukraine	6,225.0	▲5
8	Serbia	5842.5	▲5
9	Germany	5,625.0	▲1
10	China	5,162.5	▼3

9 November
Rank	Nation	Points	Move
1	Italy	27,935.0	▲1
2	Russia	25,677.5	▼1
3	United States	14,570.0	Steady
4	Spain	9,842.5	Steady
5	Czech Republic	8,192.5	Steady
6	Ukraine	6,225.0	▲1
7	Serbia	5,842.5	▲1
8	Germany	5,625.0	▲1
9	China	5,162.5	▲1
10	Belgium	4,505.0	▲1
