= 2015 Fed Cup Americas Zone Group I – Pool B =

International tennis competition

Pool B of the 2015 Fed Cup Americas Group I was one of two pools in the Americas Group I of the 2015 Fed Cup. Three teams competed in a round robin competition, with the top team and the bottom two teams proceeding to their respective sections of the play-offs: the top team played for advancement to the World Group II Play-offs, while the bottom team faced potential relegation to Group II.

== Standings ==
		(Paraguay) PAR	(Venezuela) VEN	(Mexico) MEX	(Bolivia) BOL	RR; W–L	Set; W–L	Game; W–L	Standings	
23	Paraguay		3–0	2–1	3–0	3–0	8–1	17–5	120–72	1
34	Venezuela	0–3		0–3	1–2	0–3	1–8	5–17	79–127	4
43	Mexico	1–2	3–0		2–1	2–1	6–3	14–10	118–99	2
45	Bolivia	0–3	2–1	1–2		1–2	3–6	11–15	109–128	3

=== Paraguay vs. Bolivia ===
Paraguay
3
La Loma Sports Centre, San Luis Potosí, Mexico
4 February 2014
Hard

Bolivia
0

			1	2	3
1	(Paraguay) (Bolivia)	Montserrat González; Noelia Zeballos	3; 6	6; 3	6; 2
2	(Paraguay) (Bolivia)	Verónica Cepede Royg; María Fernanda Álvarez Terán	6; 0	6; 2
3	(Paraguay) (Bolivia)	Montserrat González / Verónica Cepede Royg; María Fernanda Álvarez Terán / Noelia Zeballos	3; 6	6; 2	6; 3

=== Venezuela vs. Mexico ===
Venezuela
0
La Loma Sports Centre, San Luis Potosí, Mexico
4 February 2014
Hard

Mexico
3

			1	2	3
1	(Venezuela) (Mexico)	Mariaryeni Gutiérrez; Marcela Zacarías	3; 6	1; 6
2	(Venezuela) (Mexico)	Adriana Pérez; Ana Sofía Sánchez	5; 7	7; 5	4; 6
3	(Venezuela) (Mexico)	Aymet Uzcátegui / Viviana Onorato; Victoria Rodríguez / Marcela Zacarías	1; 6	0; 6

=== Paraguay vs. Mexico ===
Paraguay
2
La Loma Sports Centre, San Luis Potosí, Mexico
5 February 2014
Hard

Mexico
1

			1	2	3
1	(Paraguay) (Mexico)	Montserrat González; Marcela Zacarías	3; 6	6; 3	5; 7
2	(Paraguay) (Mexico)	Verónica Cepede Royg; Ana Sofía Sánchez	6; 4	6; 3
3	(Paraguay) (Mexico)	Verónica Cepede Royg / Montserrat González; Victoria Rodríguez / Marcela Zacarías	6; 3	3; 6	6; 3

=== Venezuela vs. Bolivia ===
Venezuela
1
La Loma Sports Centre, San Luis Potosí, Mexico
5 February 2014
Hard

Bolivia
2

			1	2	3
1	(Venezuela) (Bolivia)	Aymet Uzcátegui; Noelia Zeballos	4; 6	6; 3	4; 6
2	(Venezuela) (Bolivia)	Adriana Pérez; María Fernanda Álvarez Terán	4; 6	7^{7} 6^{1}	6; 3
3	(Venezuela) (Bolivia)	Adriana Pérez / Aymet Uzcátegui; María Fernanda Álvarez Terán / Noelia Zeballos	6^{5} 7^{7}	7; 5	1; 6

=== Paraguay vs. Venezuela ===
Paraguay
3
La Loma Sports Centre, San Luis Potosí, Mexico
6 February 2014
Hard

Venezuela
0

			1	2	3
1	(Paraguay) (Venezuela)	Montserrat González; Viviana Onorato	6; 0	6; 0
2	(Paraguay) (Venezuela)	Verónica Cepede Royg; Mariaryeni Gutiérrez	6; 3	6; 2
3	(Paraguay) (Venezuela)	Camila Giangreco Campiz / Sara Giménez; Mariaryeni Gutiérrez / Viviana Onorato	7; 5	6; 3

=== Mexico vs. Bolivia ===
Mexico
2
La Loma Sports Centre, San Luis Potosí, Mexico
6 February 2014
Hard

Bolivia
1

			1	2	3
1	(Mexico) (Bolivia)	Marcela Zacarías; Noelia Zeballos	0; 6	7; 5	6; 2
2	(Mexico) (Bolivia)	Ana Sofía Sánchez; María Fernanda Álvarez Terán	6; 2	2; 6	3; 6
3	(Mexico) (Bolivia)	Victoria Rodríguez / Renata Zarazúa; María Fernanda Álvarez Terán / Noelia Zeballos	6; 2	5; 7	6; 1
