= 2015 Fed Cup Asia/Oceania Zone Group I – Pool B =

Pool B of the 2015 Fed Cup Asia/Oceania Group I was one of two pools in the Asia/Oceania Group I of the 2015 Fed Cup. Three teams competed in a round robin competition, with the top team and the bottom two teams proceeding to their respective sections of the play-offs: the top team played for advancement to the World Group II Play-offs, while the bottom team faced potential relegation to Group II.

== Standings ==
		(Thailand) THA	(Kazakhstan) KAZ	(China) CHN	(Chinese Taipei) TPE	RR; W–L	Set; W–L	Game; W–L	Standings	
21	Thailand		1–2	1–2	2–1	1–2	4–5	10–11	80–98	3
22	Kazakhstan	2–1		2–1	2–1	3–0	6–3	13–9	106–87	1
29	China	2–1	1–2		2–1	2–1	5–4	10–8	94–74	2
44	Chinese Taipei	1–2	1–2	1–2		0–3	3–6	6–11	62–83	4

== Round-robin ==
=== Thailand vs. Chinese Taipei ===
Thailand
2
Guangdong Olympic Tennis Centre, Guangzhou, China
4 February 2015
Hard

Chinese Taipei
1

			1	2	3
1	(Thailand) (Chinese Taipei)	Tamarine Tanasugarn; Chan Yung-jan	6; 1	6; 0
2	(Thailand) (Chinese Taipei)	Luksika Kumkhum; Hsieh Su-wei	2; 6	1; 6
3	(Thailand) (Chinese Taipei)	Peangtarn Plipuech / Tamarine Tanasugarn; Chan Hao-ching / Lee Ya-hsuan	6; 4	6; 3

=== Kazakhstan vs. China ===
Kazakhstan
2
Guangdong Olympic Tennis Centre, Guangzhou, China
4 February 2015
Hard

China
1

			1	2	3
1	(Kazakhstan) (China)	Yaroslava Shvedova; Wang Qiang	4; 6	6; 4	6; 3
2	(Kazakhstan) (China)	Zarina Diyas; Zhang Shuai	7; 5	6; 0
3	(Kazakhstan) (China)	Kamila Kerimbayeva / Yulia Putintseva; Peng Shuai / Zheng Saisai	1; 6	5; 7

=== Thailand vs. China ===
Thailand
1
Guangdong Olympic Tennis Centre, Guangzhou, China
5 February 2015
Hard

China
2

			1	2	3
1	(Thailand) (China)	Peangtarn Plipuech; Wang Qiang	0; 6	1; 6
2	(Thailand) (China)	Tamarine Tanasugarn; Zheng Saisai	6; 3	4; 6	2; 6
3	(Thailand) (China)	Luksika Kumkhum / Nicha Lertpitaksinchai; Wang Qiang / Zheng Saisai	6; 2	7^{7} 6^{3}

=== Kazakhstan vs. Chinese Taipei ===
Kazakhstan
2
Guangdong Olympic Tennis Centre, Guangzhou, China
5 February 2015
Hard

Chinese Taipei
1

			1	2	3
1	(Kazakhstan) (Chinese Taipei)	Yaroslava Shvedova; Lee Ya-hsuan	6; 1	6; 1
2	(Kazakhstan) (Chinese Taipei)	Zarina Diyas; Hsieh Su-wei	6; 4	2; 6	7; 5
3	(Kazakhstan) (Chinese Taipei)	Kamila Kerimbayeva / Yulia Putintseva; Chan Hao-ching / Chan Yung-jan	0; 6	1; 6

=== Thailand vs. Kazakhstan ===
Thailand
1
Guangdong Olympic Tennis Centre, Guangzhou, China
6 February 2015
Hard

Kazakhstan
2

			1	2	3
1	(Thailand) (Kazakhstan)	Peangtarn Plipuech; Yaroslava Shvedova	7^{7} 6^{3}	5; 7	2; 6
2	(Thailand) (Kazakhstan)	Nicha Lertpitaksinchai; Zarina Diyas	0; 6	0; 6
3	(Thailand) (Kazakhstan)	Luksika Kumkhum / Tamarine Tanasugarn; Kamila Kerimbayeva / Yulia Putintseva	6; 3	1; 6	6; 3

=== China vs. Chinese Taipei ===
China
2
Guangdong Olympic Tennis Centre, Guangzhou, China
6 February 2015
Hard

Chinese Taipei
1

			1	2	3
1	(China) (Chinese Taipei)	Wang Qiang; Lee Ya-hsuan	6; 1	6; 3
2	(China) (Chinese Taipei)	Zheng Saisai; Chan Yung-jan	6; 2	4; 6	4; 0
3	(China) (Chinese Taipei)	Wang Qiang / Zheng Saisai; Chan Hao-ching / Lee Ya-hsuan	2; 1			retired
