= 2015 Fed Cup Americas Zone Group II – Pool A =

Pool A of the 2015 Fed Cup Americas Group II was one of four pools in the Americas Group II of the 2015 Fed Cup. Three teams competed in a round robin competition, with each team proceeding to their respective sections of the play-offs: the top team played for advancement to the Group I.

== Standings ==
| | | (Ecuador) ECU | (Uruguay) URU | (Barbados) BAR | RR; W–L | Set; W–L | Game; W–L | Standings |
| 1 | Ecuador | | 3–0 | 3–0 | 6–0 | 12–1 | 77–29 | 1 |
| | Uruguay | 0–3 | | 1–2 | 1–5 | 4–11 | 41–75 | 3 |
| | Barbados | 0–3 | 2–1 | | 2–4 | 6–10 | 59–73 | 2 |

== Round-robin ==
=== Uruguay vs. Barbados ===
Uruguay
1
Centro Nacional de Tenis, Santo Domingo Este, Dominican Republic
24 June 2015
Hard (outdoors)

Barbados
2

| | | | 1 | 2 | 3 |
|---|---|---|---|---|---|
| 1 | (Uruguay) (Barbados) | Florencia Rossi; Kiana Marshall | 2; 6 | 6; 4 | 3; 6 |
| 2 | (Uruguay) (Barbados) | Margot Mercier; Melena Lopez | 1; 6 | 6; 2 | 6; 0 |
| 3 | (Uruguay) (Barbados) | Cecilia Mercier / Florencia Rossi; Kiana Marshall / Cherise Slocombe | 1; 6 | 6; 3 | 1; 6 |

=== Ecuador vs. Barbados ===
Ecuador
3
Centro Nacional de Tenis, Santo Domingo Este, Dominican Republic
25 June 2015
Hard (outdoors)

Barbados
0

| | | | 1 | 2 | 3 |
|---|---|---|---|---|---|
| 1 | (Ecuador) (Barbados) | Doménica González; Kiana Marshall | 5; 7 | 6; 2 | 6; 4 |
| 2 | (Ecuador) (Barbados) | Charlotte Römer; Melena Lopez | 6; 0 | 6; 1 |
| 3 | (Ecuador) (Barbados) | Charlotte Römer / Camila Romero; Kiana Marshall / Cherise Slocombe | 6; 4 | 6; 2 |

=== Ecuador vs. Uruguay ===
Ecuador
3
Centro Nacional de Tenis, Santo Domingo Este, Dominican Republic
26 June 2015
Hard (outdoors)

Uruguay
0

| | | | 1 | 2 | 3 |
|---|---|---|---|---|---|
| 1 | (Ecuador) (Uruguay) | Camila Romero; Florencia Rossi | 6; 0 | 6; 2 |
| 2 | (Ecuador) (Uruguay) | Charlotte Römer; Margot Mercier | 6; 2 | 6; 2 |
| 3 | (Ecuador) (Uruguay) | Rafaela Gómez / Doménica González; Cecilia Mercier / Margot Mercier | 6; 2 | 6; 1 |
