= 2015 Fed Cup Americas Zone Group II – Pool C =

Pool C of the 2015 Fed Cup Americas Group II was one of four pools in the Americas Group II of the 2015 Fed Cup. Three teams competed in a round robin competition, with each team proceeding to their respective sections of the play-offs: the top team played for advancement to the Group I.

== Standings ==
		(Dominican Republic) DOM	(Peru) PER	(Honduras) HON	RR; W–L	Set; W–L	Game; W–L	Standings
3	Dominican Republic		1–2	3–0	4–2	8–5	66–51	2
	Peru	2–1		3–0	5–1	11–2	72–33	1
	Honduras	0–3	0–3		0–6	0–12	19–73	3

== Round-robin ==
=== Dominican Republic vs. Honduras ===
Dominican Republic
3
Centro Nacional de Tenis, Santo Domingo Este, Dominican Republic
24 June 2015
Hard (outdoors)

Honduras
0

			1	2	3
1	(Dominican Republic) (Honduras)	Michelle Marie Valdez; Daniela Obando	6; 2	6; 1
2	(Dominican Republic) (Honduras)	Francesca Segarelli; Zulema Zelaya	7; 5	6; 3
3	(Dominican Republic) (Honduras)	Karla Portalatin / Francesca Segarelli; Natalie Gabriela Espinal Sánchez / Daniela Obando	6; 1	6; 3

=== Peru vs. Honduras ===
Peru
3
Centro Nacional de Tenis, Santo Domingo Este, Dominican Republic
25 June 2015
Hard (outdoors)

Honduras
0

			1	2	3
1	(Peru) (Honduras)	Dominique Schaefer; Daniela Obando	6; 1	6; 0
2	(Peru) (Honduras)	Bianca Botto; Zulema Zelaya	6; 0	6; 1
3	(Peru) (Honduras)	Bianca Botto / Dominique Schaefer; Natalie Gabriela Espinal Sánchez / Alejandra Obando	6; 1	6; 1

=== Dominican Republic vs. Peru ===
Dominican Republic
1
Centro Nacional de Tenis, Santo Domingo Este, Dominican Republic
26 June 2015
Hard (outdoors)

Peru
2

			1	2	3
1	(Dominican Republic) (Peru)	Michelle Marie Valdez; Patricia Kú Flores	0; 6	4; 6
2	(Dominican Republic) (Peru)	Francesca Segarelli; Bianca Botto	4; 6	6; 4	6; 1
3	(Dominican Republic) (Peru)	Francesca Segarelli / Michelle Marie Valdez; Bianca Botto / Dominique Schaefer	4; 6	5; 7
