= 2016 Fed Cup Americas Zone =

Subsection of tennis competition

The Americas Zone was one of three zones of regional competition in the 2016 Fed Cup.

== Group I ==
- Venue: Country Club Las Palmas, Santa Cruz, Bolivia (outdoor clay)
- Date: 3–6 February

The eight teams were divided into two pools of four teams. The two pool winners took part in a play-off to determine the nation advancing to the World Group II play-offs. The four nations finishing third and fourth in their pools took part in relegation play-offs, with the two losing nations being relegated to Group II for 2017.

=== Pools ===
	Pool A	PAR	MEX	BOL	COL
1	Paraguay (3–0)		2–1	2–1	2–1
2	Mexico (2–1)	1–2		2–1	3–0
3	Bolivia (1–2)	1–2	1–2		2–1
4	Colombia (0–3)	1–2	0–3	1–2	

	Pool B	ARG	BRA	ECU	PER
1	Argentina (3–0)		2–1	3–0	3–0
2	Brazil (2–1)	1–2		3–0	3–0
3	Ecuador (1–2)	0–3	0–3		2–1
4	Peru (0–3)	0–3	0–3	1–2	

=== Play-offs ===
Placing	A Team	Score	B Team
Promotional	Paraguay	0–2	Argentina
3rd–4th	Mexico	0–2	Brazil
Relegation	Bolivia	2–0	Peru
Relegation	Colombia	2–0	Ecuador

=== Final placements ===
Placing	Teams	
Promoted/First	Argentina	
Second	Paraguay	
Third	Brazil	
Fourth	Mexico	
Fifth	Bolivia	Colombia
Relegated/Seventh	Ecuador	Peru

- Argentina was promoted to the 2016 Fed Cup World Group II Play-offs.
- Ecuador and Peru were relegated to Americas Zone Group II in 2017.

== Group II ==
- Venue: Centro de Tenis Honda, Bayamón, Puerto Rico (outdoor hard)
- Date: 1–6 February

The nine teams were divided into one pool of four teams and one pool of five teams. The top two nations in each pool took part in play-offs, with the two winning nations being promoted to Group I for 2017.

=== Pools ===
	Pool A	VEN	CHI	HON	CRC
1	Venezuela (3–0)		2–1	3–0	3–0
2	Chile (2–1)	1–2		2–1	3–0
3	Honduras (1–2)	0–3	1–2		2–1
4	Costa Rica (0–3)	0–3	0–3	1–2	

	Pool B	PUR	GUA	URU	DOM	BAH
1	Puerto Rico (4–0)		2–1	2–1	3–0	3–0
2	Guatemala (3–1)	1–2		2–1	3–0	3–0
3	Uruguay (2–2)	1–2	1–2		3–0	2–1
4	Dominican Republic (1–3)	0–3	0–3	0–3		2–1
5	Bahamas (0–4)	0–3	0–3	1–2	1–2	

=== Play-offs ===
Placing	A Team	Score	B Team
Promotion	Venezuela	2–0	Guatemala
Promotion	Chile	2–1	Puerto Rico
5th–6th	Honduras	0–2	Uruguay
7th–8th	Costa Rica	2–0	Dominican Republic
9th	—		Bahamas

=== Final placements ===
Placing	Teams	
Promoted/First	Chile	Venezuela
Third	Guatemala	Puerto Rico
Fifth	Uruguay	
Sixth	Honduras	
Seventh	Costa Rica	
Eighth	Dominican Republic	
Ninth	Bahamas	

- Chile and Venezuela were promoted to Americas Zone Group I in 2017.
