= 2015 Fed Cup Americas Zone Group II – Pool B =

Pool B of the 2015 Fed Cup Americas Group II was one of four pools in the Americas Group II of the 2015 Fed Cup. Three teams competed in a round robin competition, with each team proceeding to their respective sections of the play-offs: the top team played for advancement to the Group I.

== Standings ==
		(The Bahamas) BAH	(Trinidad and Tobago) TRI	(Costa Rica) CRI	RR; W–L	Set; W–L	Game; W–L	Standings
2	Bahamas		0–3	1–2	1–5	3–10	36–66	3
	Trinidad and Tobago	3–0		2–1	5–1	11–2	74–38	1
	Costa Rica	2–1	1–2		3–3	6–8	56–64	2

== Round-robin ==
=== Bahamas vs. Trinidad and Tobago ===
Bahamas
0
Centro Nacional de Tenis, Santo Domingo Este, Dominican Republic
24 June 2015
Hard (outdoors)

Trinidad and Tobago
3

			1	2	3
1	(The Bahamas) (Trinidad and Tobago)	Dominique Mortier; Anneliese Rose	2; 6	1; 6
2	(The Bahamas) (Trinidad and Tobago)	Kerrie Cartwright; Brena Stampfli	0; 6	1; 6
3	(The Bahamas) (Trinidad and Tobago)	Kerrie Cartwright / Dominique Mortier; Anneliese Rose / Brena Stampfli	4; 6	4; 6

=== Costa Rica vs. Trinidad and Tobago ===
Costa Rica
1
Centro Nacional de Tenis, Santo Domingo Este, Dominican Republic
25 June 2015
Hard (outdoors)

Trinidad and Tobago
2

			1	2	3
1	(Costa Rica) (Trinidad and Tobago)	Eugenia Camacho; Anneliese Rose	1; 6	3; 6
2	(Costa Rica) (Trinidad and Tobago)	Ariana Rahmanparast; Brena Stampfli	1; 6	5; 7
3	(Costa Rica) (Trinidad and Tobago)	Eugenia Camacho / Camila Quesada; Olivia Bennett / Shenelle Mohammed	4; 6	6; 4	6; 3

=== Bahamas vs. Costa Rica ===
Bahamas
1
Centro Nacional de Tenis, Santo Domingo Este, Dominican Republic
26 June 2015
Hard (outdoors)

Costa Rica
2

			1	2	3
1	(The Bahamas) (Costa Rica)	Dominique Mortier; Ariana Rahmanparast	1; 6	0; 6
2	(The Bahamas) (Costa Rica)	Kerrie Cartwright; Camila Quesada	6; 2	6; 2
3	(The Bahamas) (Costa Rica)	Kerrie Cartwright / Dominique Mortier; Camila Quesada / Ariana Rahmanparast	6; 1	2; 6	5; 7
