= Brazil Billie Jean King Cup team =

Brazilian women's tennis team

Brazil
- Captain: Luiz Peniza
- Coach: Rafael Pacciaroni
- Nations Ranking: 20 ▼1 (16 November 2024)
- Colors: yellow / green
- First year: 1965
- Years played: 49
- Ties played (W–L): 177 (99–78)
- Years in World Group: 22 (7–22)
- Best finish: World Group QF (1965, 1982)
- Most total wins: Beatriz Haddad Maia (32–21)
- Most singles wins: Beatriz Haddad Maia (21–10)
- Most doubles wins: Joana Cortez (16–5)
- Best doubles team: Joana Cortez / Vanessa Menga (8–0)
- Most ties played: Patricia Medrado (39)
- Most years played: Patricia Medrado (13)

The Brazil Billie Jean King Cup team, officially Time Brasil BRB for sponsorship reasons, represents Brazil in the Billie Jean King Cup tennis competition and are governed by the Brazilian Tennis Confederation. They currently compete in the qualifiers.

== History ==
Brazil competed in its first Fed Cup in 1965. Their best result was reaching the quarterfinals in 1982.

=== First team (1965) ===
- Maria Esther Bueno
- Maureen Schwartz

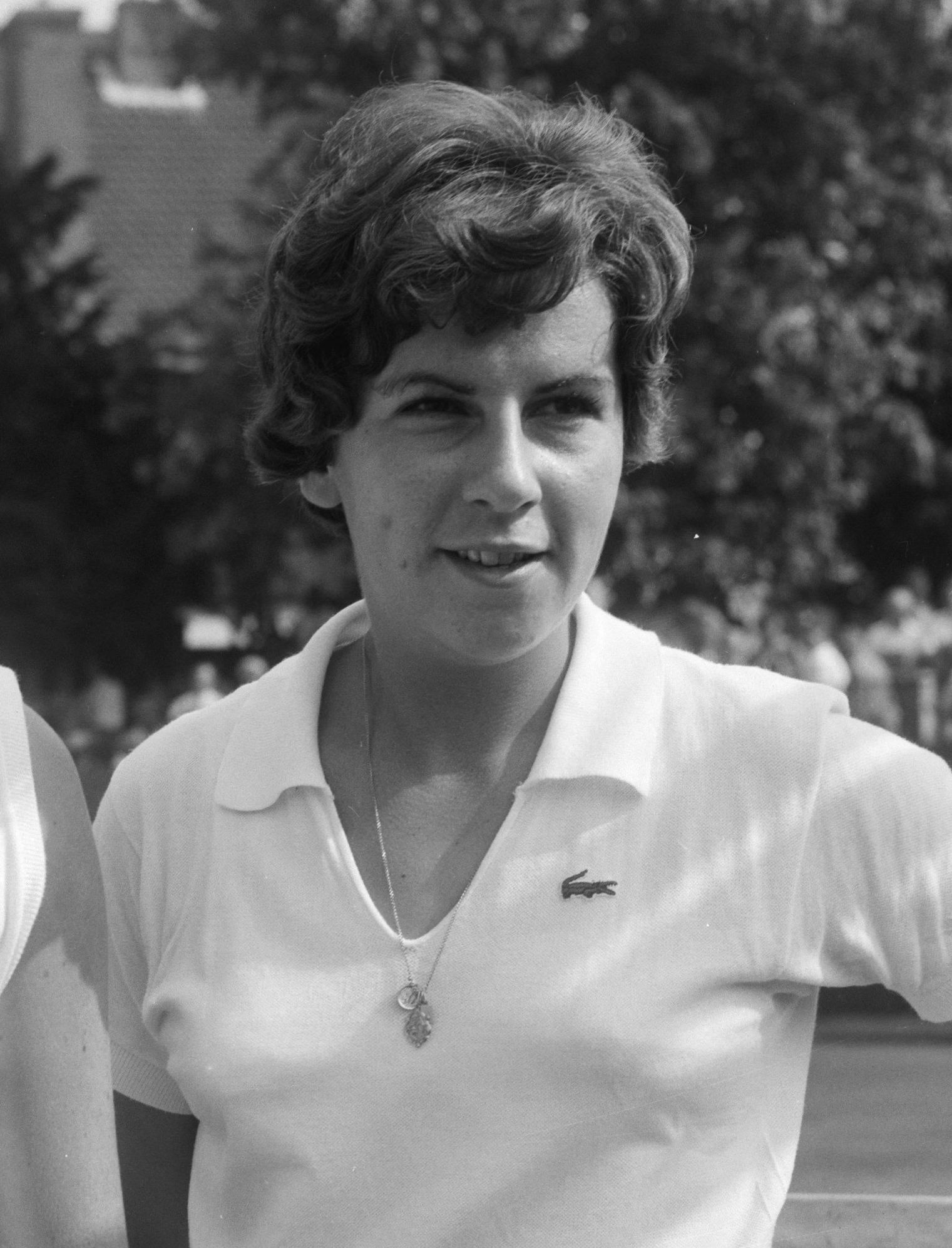
Maria Esther Bueno

== 2026 team ==
The team for the 2026 Billie Jean King Cup is:

- Nauhany Vitória Leme da Silva
- Luisa Stefani
- Gabriela Vianna Cé
- Laura Pigossi
- Luiza Fullana

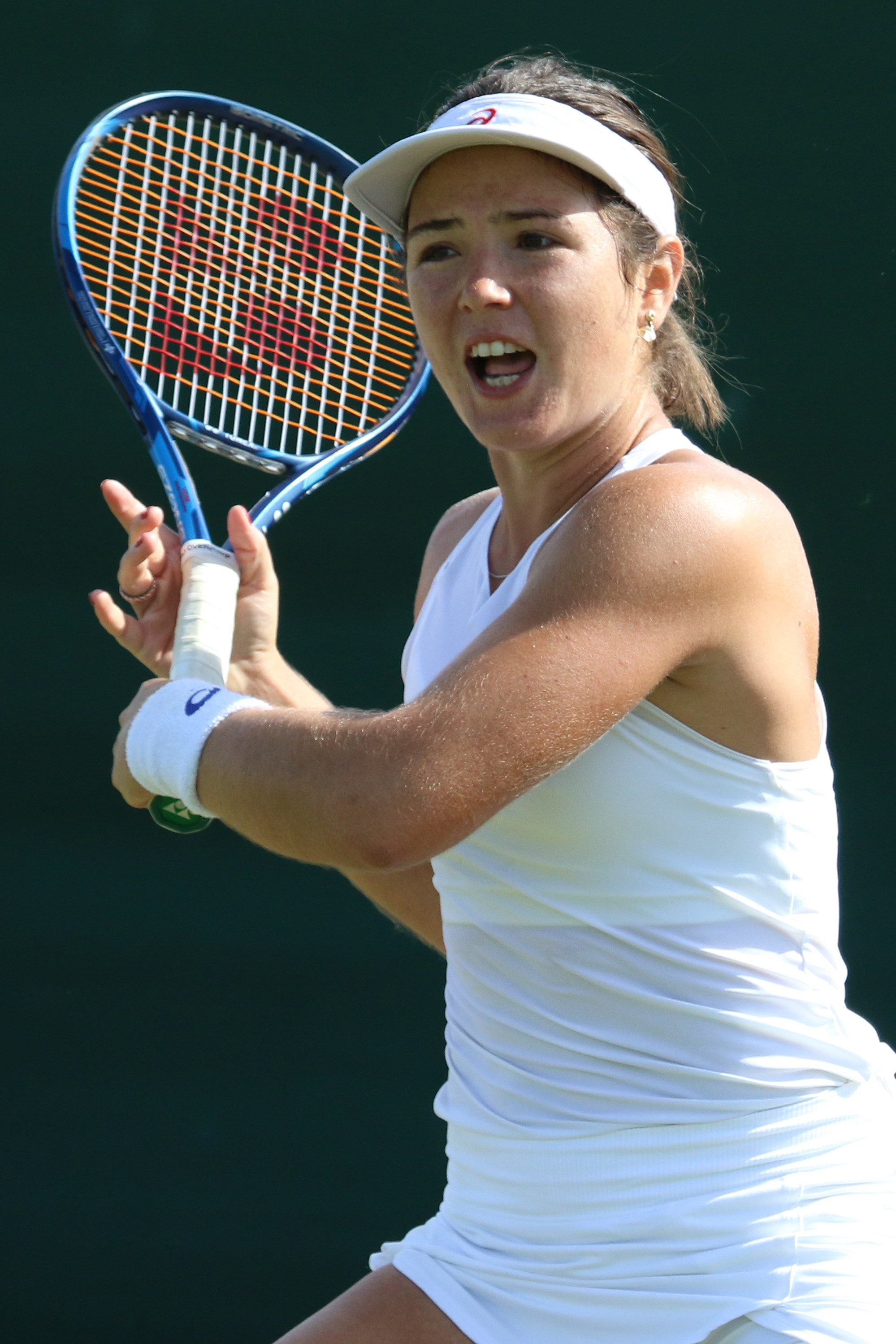
Gabriela Vianna Cé

Luiza Fullana

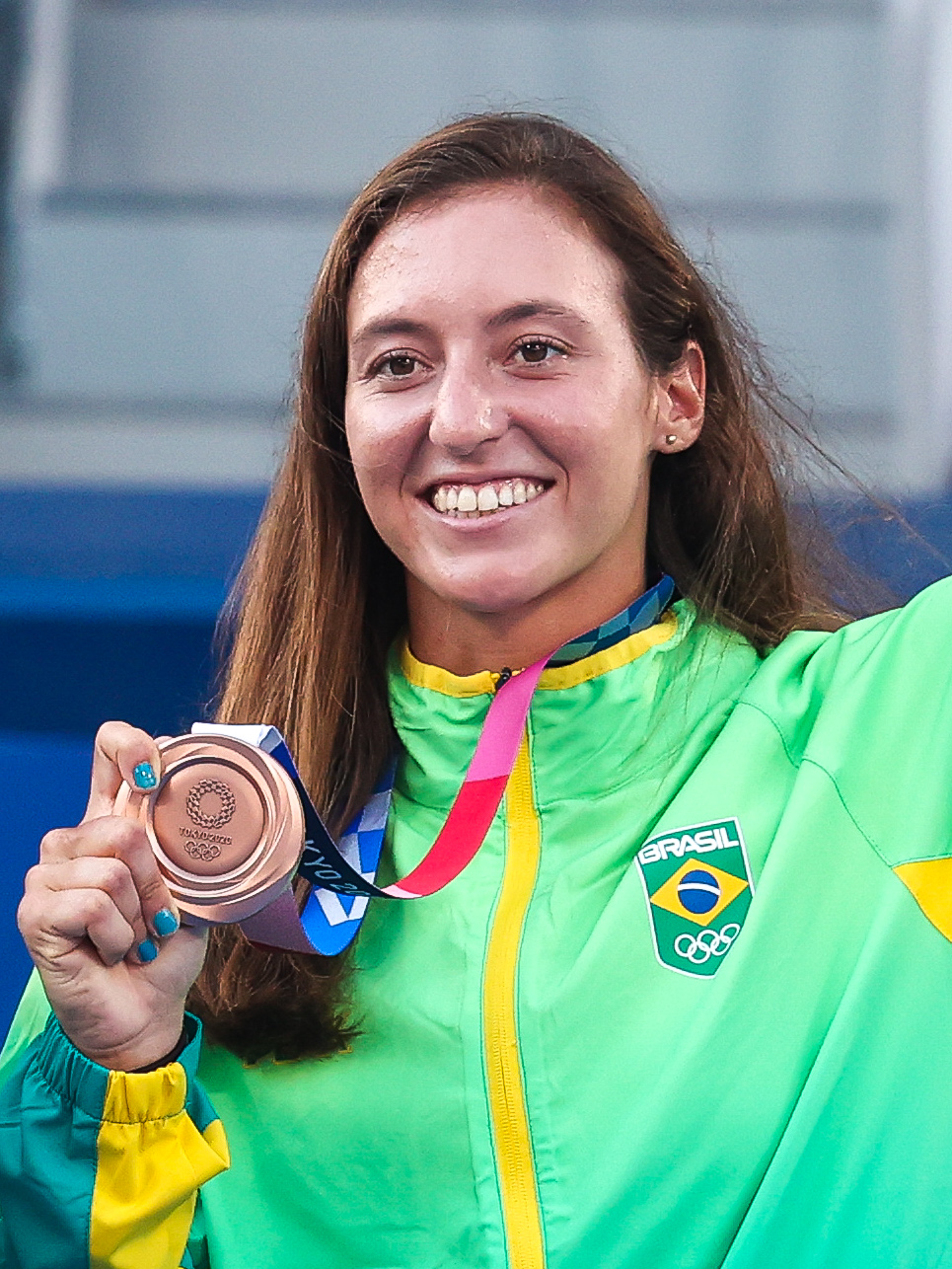
Luisa Stefani

Laura Pigossi

== Results by year ==
=== 1965–1969 ===
- 1965 (4 rounds, 11 teams): In their debut, after a bye in the 1st round, Brazil lost in the quarterfinals to France.
- 1966–1967: Brazil did not participate in these editions.
- 1968 (5 rounds, 23 teams): After a bye in the 1st round, Brazil lost in the 2nd round to Australia.
- 1969 (5 rounds, 20 teams): Brazil withdrew in the 1st round against West Germany.

=== 1970–1979 ===
- 1970–1971: Brazil did not participate in these editions.
- 1972 (5 rounds, 31 teams): After a win in the 1st round over Switzerland, Brazil lost in the 2nd round to South Africa.
- 1973 (5 rounds, 30 teams): Brazil lost in the 1st round to Romania.
- 1974: Brazil did not participate in this edition held in Naples.
- 1975 (5 rounds, 31 teams): Brazil lost in the 1st round to Italy.
- 1976 (5 rounds, 32 teams): Brazil lost in the 1st round to Netherlands.
- 1977 (5 rounds, 32 teams): After a win in the 1st round over Chinese Taipei, Brazil lost in the 2nd round to Australia.
- 1978 (5 rounds, 32 teams): Brazil lost in the 1st round to West Germany.
- 1979: Brazil did not participate in this edition held in Madrid.

=== 1980–1989 ===
- 1980: Brazil did not participate in this edition held in Berlin.
- 1981 (5 rounds, 32 teams): After a win in the 1st round over Ireland, Brazil lost in the 2nd round to West Germany.
- 1982 (5 rounds, 32 teams): Brazil defeated France in the 1st round and Hong Kong in the 2nd round, but lost in the quarterfinals to United States.
- 1983 (qualifications + 5 rounds, 39 teams): Brazil defeated Israel in the 1st round, then lost to Great Britain in the 2nd round.
- 1984 (qualifications + 5 rounds, 36 teams): Brazil lost in the 1st round to Sweden.
- 1985 (qualifications + 5 rounds, 38 teams): Brazil lost in the 1st round to China.
- 1986 (qualifications + 5 rounds, 42 teams): Brazil defeated Romania in the 1st round, then lost in the 2nd round to West Germany.
- 1987 (qualifications + 5 rounds, 42 teams): Brazil lost in the 1st round to New Zealand.
- 1988 (qualifications + 5 rounds, 36 teams): Brazil lost in the 1st round to Czechoslovakia.
- 1989 (qualifications + 5 rounds, 40 teams): Brazil lost in the 1st round to Canada.

=== 1990–1999 ===
- 1990 (qualifications + 5 rounds, 44 teams): Brazil lost in the 1st round to Soviet Union.
- 1991 (qualifications + 5 rounds + play-offs, 56 teams): After a loss in the 1st round to China and a defeat in play-offs to Argentina, Brazil also lost to Paraguay in the play-offs.
- 1992–1993–1994: Brazil did not participate in these editions.

The competition changed its format in 1995: the "Federation Cup" became the "Fed Cup".

- 1995–1996–1997–1998–1999: Brazil competed in the regional zone groups.

=== 2000–2009 ===
- 2000–2001–2002: Brazil competed in the regional zone groups.
- 2003 (4 rounds, 16 teams + play-offs): Brazil lost in play-offs I to Croatia.
- 2004 (4 rounds, 16 teams + play-offs): Brazil lost in play-offs I to Croatia.
- 2005–2006–2007–2008–2009: Brazil competed in the regional zone groups.

=== 2010–2019 ===
- 2010–2011–2012–2013: Brazil competed in the regional zone groups.
- 2014 (3 rounds, 8 teams + World Group II, play-offs I and II): Brazil lost in play-offs II to Switzerland.
- 2015 –2016–2017–2018: Brazil competed in the regional zone groups.
- 2019 (3 rounds, 8 teams + World Group II, play-offs I and II): Brazil lost in play-offs II to Slovakia.

=== 2020–present ===
- 2020-21: Brazil lost in the qualifying round to Germany and the play-offs to Poland, being relegated to the regional zone.
- 2022: Brazil competed in the regional zone groups, was promoted to the play-offs and won playing against Argentina, being promoted to the qualifying round.
- 2023: Brazil lost in the qualifying round to Germany and was relegated to the play-offs, where it won against South Korea, being promoted to the qualifying round.
- 2024: Brazil lost in the qualifying round to Germany and was relegated to the play-offs, where it won against Argentina, being promoted to the qualifying round.
- 2025: Brazil lost in the qualifying round Group B to Spain and Czech Republic.

== See also ==
- List of Brazil Billie Jean King Cup team representatives
- Billie Jean King Cup
- Brazil Davis Cup team
- Brazilian Tennis Confederation
