= 2015 Fed Cup World Group II play-offs =

Part of tennis tournament

The World Group II play-offs were four ties which involved the losing nations of the World Group II and four nations from the three Zonal Group I competitions. Nations that won their play-off ties entered the 2016 World Group, while losing nations joined their respective zonal groups.

Participating Teams
Argentina	Belarus	Japan	Paraguay
Serbia	Slovakia	Spain	Sweden

== Serbia vs. Paraguay ==
Serbia
4
Spens Sport Centre, Novi Sad, Serbia
18–19 April 2015
Hard (outdoor)

Paraguay
1

			1	2	3
1	(Serbia) (Paraguay)	Aleksandra Krunić; Verónica Cepede Royg	6; 1	6; 3
2	(Serbia) (Paraguay)	Ana Ivanovic; Montserrat González	6; 2	6; 0
3	(Serbia) (Paraguay)	Ivana Jorović; Verónica Cepede Royg	6; 3	2; 6	1; 6
4	(Serbia) (Paraguay)	Aleksandra Krunić; Montserrat González	6; 0	6; 2
5	(Serbia) (Paraguay)	Ivana Jorović / Aleksandra Krunić; Verónica Cepede Royg / Montserrat González	6; 1	6; 4

== Slovakia vs. Sweden ==
Slovakia
4
Aegon Arena, National Tennis Centre, Bratislava, Slovakia
18–19 April 2015
Clay (indoor)

Sweden
0

			1	2	3
1	(Slovakia) (Sweden)	Anna Karolína Schmiedlová; Rebecca Peterson	6; 3	6; 3
2	(Slovakia) (Sweden)	Daniela Hantuchová; Susanne Celik	6; 2	6; 0
3	(Slovakia) (Sweden)	Anna Karolína Schmiedlová; Ellen Allgurin	6; 1	6; 4
4	(Slovakia) (Sweden)	Daniela Hantuchová; Rebecca Peterson				not played
5	(Slovakia) (Sweden)	Jana Čepelová / Anna Karolína Schmiedlová; Susanne Celik / Rebecca Peterson	4; 6	6; 3	10; 7

== Japan vs. Belarus ==
Japan
2
Ariake Coliseum, Tokyo, Japan
18–19 April 2015
Hard (indoor)

Belarus
3

			1	2	3
1	(Japan) (Belarus)	Misaki Doi; Victoria Azarenka	1; 6	2; 6
2	(Japan) (Belarus)	Kurumi Nara; Olga Govortsova	6; 4	4; 6	6; 2
3	(Japan) (Belarus)	Kurumi Nara; Victoria Azarenka	3; 6	3; 6
4	(Japan) (Belarus)	Ayumi Morita; Aliaksandra Sasnovich	7^{7} 6^{5}	4; 6	6; 4
5	(Japan) (Belarus)	Shuko Aoyama / Ayumi Morita; Victoria Azarenka / Olga Govortsova	3; 6	4; 6

== Argentina vs. Spain ==
Argentina
0
Tecnopolis, Buenos Aires, Argentina
18–19 April 2015
Clay

Spain
4

			1	2	3
1	(Argentina) (Spain)	Paula Ormaechea; Sara Sorribes Tormo	6; 4	6^{2} 7^{7}	1; 6
2	(Argentina) (Spain)	María Irigoyen; Lara Arruabarrena	0; 6	1; 6
3	(Argentina) (Spain)	Paula Ormaechea; Lara Arruabarrena	1; 6	6; 4	7; 9
4	(Argentina) (Spain)	María Irigoyen; Sara Sorribes Tormo				not played
5	(Argentina) (Spain)	Tatiana Búa / Nadia Podoroska; Anabel Medina Garrigues / Aliona Bolsova Zadoinov	6; 4	1; 6	3; 10
