= Paraguay Billie Jean King Cup team =

National tennis team

Paraguay
- Captain: Alfredo De Brix
- Nations Ranking: 17 ▲1 (16 November 2015)
- Colors: red & blue
- First year: 1991
- Years played: 25
- Ties played (W–L): 103 (65–38)
- Years in World Group: 3 (0–3)
- Best finish: World Group II Play-offs (1995, 2015)
- Most total wins: Larissa Schaerer (64–32)
- Most singles wins: Larissa Schaerer (39–17)
- Most doubles wins: Larissa Schaerer (25–15)
- Best doubles team: Verónica Cepede Royg / Montserrat González (12–2)
- Most ties played: Larissa Schaerer (55)
- Most years played: Larissa Schaerer (13)

The Paraguay Billie Jean King Cup team represents Paraguay in the Billie Jean King Cup tennis competition and are governed by the Asociación Paraguaya de Tenis.

Paraguay competed in Americas Zone Group I in 2016 - its ninth consecutive year at this level.

== History ==
Paraguay's best Fed Cup performances were in 1995 and 2015, when reaching the World Group II play-offs. Its first appearance in the competition was four years earlier in 1991.

=== Last tie ===
Paraguay was defeated by Argentina 0-2 in the Americas Zone Group I play-offs in 2016.

=== Next tie ===
Paraguay will compete in the Americas Zone Group I in 2017.

== Current team (2017) ==
- Verónica Cepede Royg
- Montserrat González
- Camila Giangreco Campiz
- Lara Escauriza

== See also ==
- Billie Jean King Cup
- Paraguay Davis Cup team
- Paraguay at the Hopman Cup
