= Ecuador Billie Jean King Cup team =

Ecuadorian women's tennis team

Ecuador
- Captain: Manuel Balda
- Nations Ranking: 40 ▲6 (16 November 2015)
- Colors: yellow & blue
- First year: 1972
- Years played: 21
- Ties played (W–L): 83 (47–36)
- Years in World Group: 1 (1–1)
- Best finish: World Group 2R (1972)
- Most total wins: María Dolores Campana (28–21)
- Most singles wins: María Dolores Campana (20–10)
- Most doubles wins: Nuria Niemes (16–15)
- Best doubles team: María Dolores Campana / Nuria Niemes (8–10)
- Most ties played: María Dolores Campana (31)
- Most years played: Nuria Niemes (10)

The Ecuador Billie Jean King Cup team represents Ecuador in Billie Jean King Cup tennis competition and are governed by the Federación Ecuatoriana de Tenis. They currently compete in the Americas Zone of Group II.

== History ==
Ecuador competed in its first Fed Cup in 1972. Their best result was reaching the round of 16 in their debut year.

== See also ==
- Billie Jean King Cup
- Ecuador Davis Cup team
