= Chile Billie Jean King Cup team =

Chilean women's tennis team

Chile
- Captain: Jorge Ibañez
- Nations Ranking: 38 ▲1 (12 November 2018)
- Colors: red & white
- First year: 1968
- Years played: 36
- Ties played (W–L): 121 (62–59)
- Years in World Group: 9 (1–9)
- Best finish: World Group play-offs (1996)
- Most total wins: Paula Cabezas (49-21)
- Most singles wins: Paula Cabezas (26-14)
- Most doubles wins: Paula Cabezas (23-7)
- Best doubles team: Paula Cabezas / Bárbara Castro (15-5)
- Most ties played: Andrea Koch Benvenuto (44)
- Most years played: Andrea Koch Benvenuto (13)

The Chile Billie Jean King Cup team represents Chile in the Billie Jean King Cup tennis competition and are governed by the Chile Tennis Federation. They currently compete in the Americas Zone Group II.

== History ==
Chile competed in its first Fed Cup in 1968. Their best result was reaching the round of 16 in 1978.

== Current team (2024) ==
- Fernanda Labraña
- Jimar Gerald
- Antonia Vergara

== See also ==
- Billie Jean King Cup
- Chile Davis Cup team
- Chile Tennis Federation
