= Peru Billie Jean King Cup team =

National sports team

Peru
- Captain: Laura Arraya
- Nations Ranking: 35 ▲ (16 November 2022)
- Colors: red & white
- First year: 1982
- Years played: 26
- Ties played (W–L): 101 (54–47)
- Years in World Group: 5 (1–5)
- Best finish: World Group 2R (1982)
- Most total wins: Bianca Botto (28–12)
- Most singles wins: Bianca Botto (18–3)
- Most doubles wins: Bianca Botto (10–9)
- Best doubles team: Anastasia Iamachkine / Camila Soares (4–0); Laura Gildemeister / Pilar Vásquez (4–7)
- Most ties played: Bianca Botto (26)
- Most years played: Bianca Botto (8)

The Peru Billie Jean King Cup team represents Peru in the Billie Jean King Cup tennis competition and are governed by the Federación Deportiva Peruana de Tenis. They currently compete in the Americas Zone Group I.

== History ==
Peru competed in its first Fed Cup in 1982. Their best result was reaching the round of 16 in their debut year.

=== First team (1982) ===
- Laura Gildemeister
- Pilar Vásquez

=== Current team (2026) ===
- Dana Guzman
- Romina Ccuno
- Yleymi Lugiana Muelle Valdez
- Leticia Alessia Bazan Bazan
- Silvana Fajardo

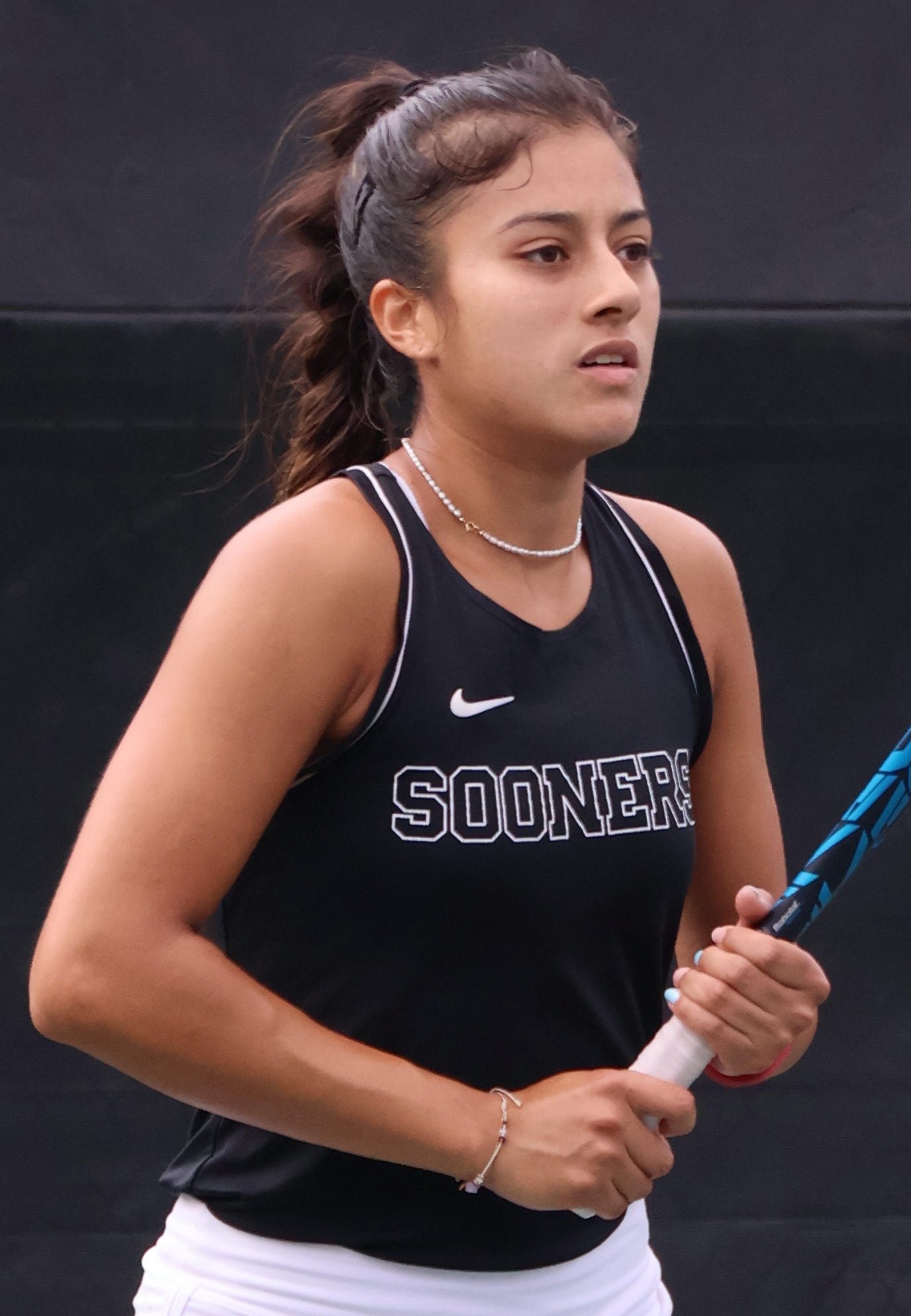
Dana Francesca Guzmán Alcas

== See also ==
- Billie Jean King Cup
- Peru Davis Cup team
