= Venus Williams career statistics =

Career finals
Discipline	Type	Won	Lost	Total
Singles	Grand Slam	7	9	16
Singles	WTA Finals	1	2	3
Singles	GS Cup	1	1	2
Singles	WTA 1000	9	6	15
Singles	WTA Tour	30	16	46
Singles	Olympics	1	–	1
Singles	Total	49	34	83
Doubles	Grand Slam	14	–	14
Doubles	WTA Finals	–	–	–
Doubles	WTA 1000	2	–	2
Doubles	WTA Tour	3	1	4
Doubles	Olympics	3	–	3
Doubles	Total	22	1	23
Mixed	Grand Slam	2	1	3
Mixed	Olympics	0	1	1
Mixed	Total	2	2	4

This is a list of the main career statistics of professional tennis player Venus Williams.

== Performance timelines ==
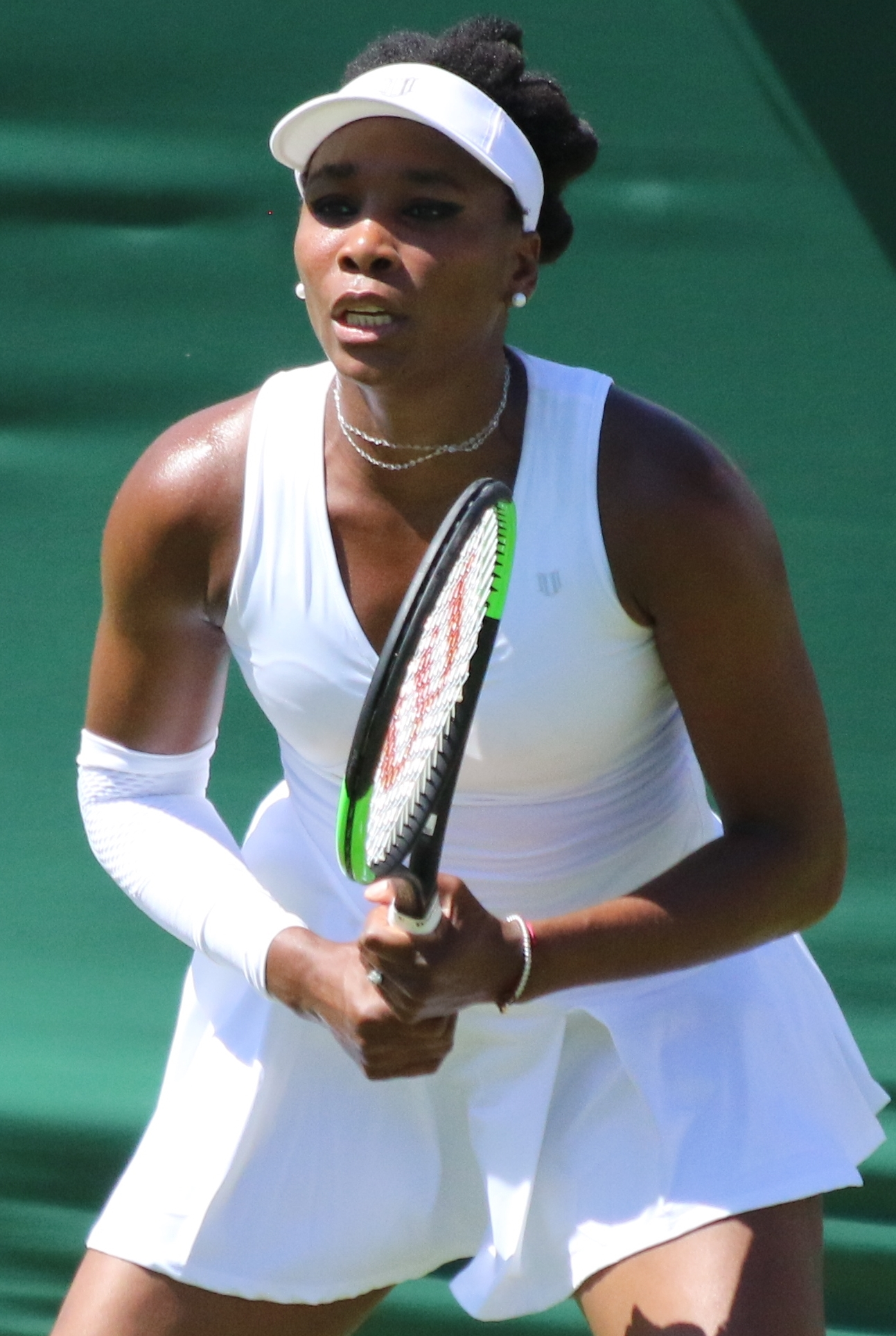
Williams in 2018

Key
W	F	SF	QF	#R	RR	Q#	P#	DNQ	A	Z#	PO	G	S	B	NMS	NTI	P	NH

(W) winner; (F) finalist; (SF) semifinalist; (QF) quarterfinalist; (#R) rounds 4, 3, 2, 1; (RR) round-robin stage; (Q#) qualification round; (P#) preliminary round; (DNQ) did not qualify; (A) absent; (Z#) Davis/Fed Cup Zonal Group (with number indication) or (PO) play-off; (G) gold, (S) silver or (B) bronze Olympic/Paralympic medal; (NMS) not a Masters tournament; (NTI) not a Tier I tournament; (P) postponed; (NH) not held; (SR) strike rate (events won / competed); (W–L) win–loss record.
To avoid confusion and double counting, these charts are updated at the conclusion of a tournament or when the player's participation has ended.

=== Singles ===
Current through the 2026 WTA Tour.

Tournament	1994	1995	1996	1997	1998	1999	2000	2001	2002	2003	2004	2005	2006	2007	2008	2009	2010	2011	2012	2013	2014	2015	2016	2017	2018	2019	2020	2021	2022	2023	2024	2025	2026	SR	W–L	Win%
Grand Slam tournaments
Australian Open	A	A	A	A	QF	QF	A	SF	QF	F	3R	4R	1R	A	QF	2R	QF	3R	A	3R	1R	QF	1R	F	1R	3R	1R	2R	A	A	A	A	1R	0 / 22	54–22	71%
French Open	A	A	A	2R	QF	4R	QF	1R	F	4R	QF	3R	QF	3R	3R	3R	4R	A	2R	1R	2R	1R	4R	4R	1R	1R	1R	1R	A	A	A	A	A	0 / 24	48–24	67%
Wimbledon	A	A	A	1R	QF	QF	W	W	F	F	2R	W	3R	W	W	F	QF	4R	1R	A	3R	4R	SF	F	3R	1R	NH	2R	A	1R	A	A	A	5 / 24	90–19	83%
US Open	A	A	A	F	SF	SF^{[b]}	W	W	F	A	4R	QF	A	SF	QF	4R	SF	2R^{[f]}	2R	2R	3R	QF	4R	SF	3R	2R	1R	A	1R	1R	A	1R	1R	2 / 26	79–23	77%
Win–loss	0–0	0–0	0–0	7–3	17–4	15–4	18–1	19–2	22–4	15–3	10–4	16–3	6–3	14–2	17–3	12–4	16–4	6–2	2–3	3–3	5–4	11–4	11–4	20–4	4–4	3–4	0–3	2–3	0–1	0–2	0–0	0–1	0–2	7 / 96	271–88	75%
Year-end championship
WTA Finals	did not qualify				A	SF	A	A	SF	A	Alt	Alt	DNQ	A	W	F	A	did not qualify				Alt	DNQ	F	DNQ		NH	did not qualify						1 / 5	14–7	67%
WTA Elite Trophy^{[1]}	not held															did not qualify			A	DNQ		W	A	did not qualify			not held			DNQ	not held			1 / 1	4–0	100%
Grand Slam Cup	men's only event				W	F	not held																											1 / 2	5–1	83%
National representation
Olympics	not held		A	not held			G	not held			3R	not held			QF	not held			3R	not held			1R	not held				A	not held		A	not held		1 / 5	13–4	76%
Fed Cup	A	A	A	A	A	W	A	A	A	F	QF	SF	A	SF	A	A	A	A	A	PO	A	PO	PO	A	F	A	A	A	A	A	A	A	A	1 / 6	21–2	91%
WTA Premier Mandatory / WTA 1000 tournaments
Indian Wells Open	Tier II		1R	QF	SF	A	A	SF^{[c]}	A														2R	QF	SF	QF	NH	A	A	A	1R	A	1R	0 / 10	21–9	70%
Miami Open	A	A	A	3R	W	W	A	W	SF	4R	QF	SF	A	3R	QF	SF	F	A	QF	3R^{[g]}	4R	QF	2R	SF	QF	4R	NH	1R	A	A	1R	A	1R	3 / 23	67–19	78%
German / Madrid Open^{[2]}	A	A	A	A	A	A	A	3R	A	A	F^{[d]}	A	A	A	A	2R	F	A	2R	A	A	1R	A	A	1R	A	NH	1R	A	A	A	A	1R	0 / 9	11–8	58%
Zurich / China Open^{[3]}	A	A	A	QF^{[a]}	F	W	A	A	A	A	QF	A	A	A	TII	2R	A	A	A	2R	3R	2R	1R	A	A	2R	not held			A	A	A	A	1 / 10	14–8	64%
WTA Premier 5 / WTA 1000 tournaments
Dubai / Qatar Open^{[4]}	not held							Tier III			Tier II				3R	W	W	A	A	A	2R	3R	A	A	A	A	A	A	A	A	A	A	A	2 / 5	13–3	81%
Italian Open	A	A	A	A	F	W	3R	A	A	A	A	A	SF	A	QF	SF	QF	A	QF	1R	2R	3R	2R	QF	3R	3R	1R	A	A	A	A	A	A	1 / 16	34–15	69%
Canadian Open	A	1R	A	1R	A	A	A	A	A	A	A	A	A	A	A	2R	A	A	A	1R	F	1R	3R	3R	3R	1R	NH	A	1R	1R	A	A	1R	0 / 13	10–13	43%
SoCal / Cincinnati Open^{[5]}	Tier II										A	A	A	QF	NH	3R	A	A	SF	2R	1R	2R^{[h]}	A	2R	A	QF	1R	A	1R	2R	A	1R	1R	0 / 13	15–12	56%
Tokyo / Wuhan Open^{[6]}	A	A	A	A	A	A	A	A	A	A	QF^{^{[e]}}	A	A	A	A	2R	A	A	A	SF	1R	W	3R	A	A	1R	not held				A	A	A	1 / 7	12–5	72%
Former Tier I tournaments
Charleston Open	A	A	A	A	A	A	A	A	A	A	W	3R	A	SF	A	Premier											NH	WTA 500						1 / 3	10–2	83%
Kremlin Cup	not held		TIII	QF	SF	A	A	A	2R	A	QF	A	A	A	1R	Premier											NH	500	not held					0 / 5	6–5	55%
Career statistics
	1994	1995	1996	1997	1998	1999	2000	2001	2002	2003	2004	2005	2006	2007	2008	2009	2010	2011	2012	2013	2014	2015	2016	2017	2018	2019	2020	2021	2022	2023	2024	2025	2026	Career		
Tournaments^{[7]}	1	3	5	13	16	18	10	12	16	6	16	12	6	13	14	16	9	4	10	11	16	17	16	14	11	15	8	9	4	7	2	3	14	Career total: 347		
Titles	0	0	0	0	3	6	6	6	7	1	2	2	0	3	3	2	2	0	1	0	1	3	1	0	0	0	0	0	0	0	0	0	0	Career total: 49		
Finals	0	0	0	1	7	10	7	6	11	4	4	4	0	4	3	5	4	0	1	0	4	3	2	3	0	0	0	0	0	0	0	0	0	Career total: 83		
Hard win–loss	0–0	0–2	2–3	14–7	38–8	36–7	25–0	32–2	38–5	10–2	21–9	20–6	1–2	31–5	29–9	21–11	19–3	3–1	14–3	13–7	22–9	34–9	16–11	26–10	14–7	16–11	1–6	2–4	0–4	2–4	0–2	1–3	0–12	33 / 220	501–184	73%
Clay win–loss	0–0	0–0	0–1	2–2	9–2	14–2	6–3	5–2	14–2	6–2	19–1	10–4	10–3	12–5	4–2	11–4	15–3	0–0	8–4	3–3	4–3	4–3	5–3	6–3	1–3	1–2	0–2	0–4	0–0	0–0	0–0	0–0	0–1	9 / 78	169–69	71%
Grass win–loss	0–0	0–0	0–0	1–2	4–2	4–1	7–0	7–0	6–1	6–1	1–1	7–0	2–1	7–0	7–0	6–1	4–1	5–2	2–2	0–0	2–1	3–1	5–1	6–1	2–1	2–2	0–0	1–1	0–0	1–3	0–0	0–0	0–1	5 / 32	98–27	78%
Carpet win–loss	1–1	2–1	0–1	2–2	2–1	7–3	3–1	2–1	4–1	4–0	3–1	0–0	0–0	0–0	0–0	0–0	0–0	0–0	0–0	0–0	4–1	0–0	0–0	0–0	0–0	discontinued								2 / 17	34–14	71%
Overall win–loss^{[8]}	1–1	2–3	2–5	19–13	53–13	61–13	41–4	46–5	62–9	26–5	44–12	37–10	13–6	50–10	40–11	38–16	38–7	8–3	24–9	16–10	32–14	41–13	26–15	38–14	17–11	19–15	1–8	3–9	0–4	3–7	0–2	1–3	0–14	49 / 347	802–294	73%
Win %	50%	40%	29%	69%	80%	82%	91%	90%	87%	84%	79%	79%	68%	83%	78%	70%	84%	73%	73%	62%	72%	76%	63%	73%	61%	56%	11%	27%	0%	30%	0%	25%	0%	Career total: 73%		
Year-end ranking	–	204	216	22	5	3	3	3	2	11	9	10	48	8	6	6	5	103	24	49	19	7	17	5	40	53	78	313	1010	407	970	572	594	$43,361,575		

Notes

- ^{^{1}} The WTA Tournament of Champions was held from 2009–2014 until the WTA Elite Trophy replaced it in 2015.
- ^{^{2}} In 2009, the WTA German Open was abolished and replaced by the Madrid Open.
- ^{^{3}} In 2009, the Zurich Open was downgraded to a Premier event and replaced by the China Open.
- ^{^{4}} The first Premier 5 event of the year has switched back and forth between the Dubai Tennis Championships and the Qatar Open since 2009. Dubai was classified as a Premier 5 event from 2009 to 2011 before being succeeded by Doha for the 2012–2014 period. Since 2015, it has alternated, being held in Dubai in odd years and Doha in even years. From 2024, both tournaments were WTA 1000 events.
- ^{^{5}} After 2007, the Southern California Open was downgraded and replaced in 2009 by the Cincinnati Masters.
- ^{^{6}} In 2014, the Pan Pacific Open was downgraded to a Premier event and replaced by the Wuhan Open.
- ^{^{7}} Tournament appearances include Grand Slam, WTA Tour main draw tournaments and the Summer Olympics. They do not include Fed Cup matches.
- ^{^{8}} Overall win–loss include Grand Slam, WTA Tour main draw, Summer Olympics and Fed Cup matches. They do not include qualifying matches.
- ^{^{a}} 1997 Zurich Open counts as 1 win, 1 loss. Venus received a walkover in the third round after Henrieta Nagyová withdrew.
- ^{^{b}} 1999 US Open counts as 4 wins, 1 loss. Venus received a walkover in the second round after Anke Huber withdrew.
- ^{^{c}} 2001 Indian Wells counts as 4 wins, 0 losses. Serena Williams received a walkover in the semi-finals after Venus withdrew. (Note: Venus also received a first round bye, which counts as neither a win nor a loss).
- ^{^{d}} 2004 WTA German Open counts as 4 wins, 0 losses. Amélie Mauresmo received a walkover in the final after Venus withdrew. (Note: Venus also received a first round bye, which counts as neither a win nor a loss).
- ^{^{e}} 2004 Pan Pacific Open counts as 1 win, 0 losses. Chanda Rubin received a walkover in the quarterfinals after Venus withdrew. (Note: Venus also received a first round bye, which counts as neither a win nor a loss).
- ^{^{f}} 2011 US Open counts as 1 win, 0 losses. Sabine Lisicki received a walkover in the second round after Venus withdrew.
- ^{^{g}} 2013 Miami Open counts as 1 win, 0 losses. Sloane Stephens received a walkover in the third round after Venus withdrew.(Note: Venus also received a first round bye, which counts as neither a win nor a loss).
- ^{^{h}} 2015 Cincinnati Masters counts as 1 win, 0 losses. Ana Ivanovic received a walkover in the second round after Venus withdrew.

=== Doubles ===
Tournament	1997	1998	1999	2000	2001	2002	2003	2004	2005	2006	2007	2008	2009	2010	2011	2012	2013	2014	2015	2016	2017	2018	2019	2020	2021	2022	2023	2024	2025	2026	SR	W–L	Win%
Grand Slam tournaments
Australian Open	A	3R	SF	A	W	A	W	A	A	A	A	QF	W	W	A	A	QF	A	A	A	A	A	A	A	A	A	A	A	A	1R	4 / 9	36–5	88%
French Open	A	A	W	A	A	A	A	A	A	A	A	A	3R	W^{[7]}	A	A	1R^{[9]}	A	A	3R	A	3R	A	A	1R	A	A	A	A	A	2 / 7	17–4	81%
Wimbledon	A	1R^{[1]}	A	W	3R^{[5]}	W	3R	A	A	A	2R^{[6]}	W	W	QF	A	W	A	2R	A	W	A	A	A	NH	A	A	A	A	A	A	6 / 12	45–3	94%
US Open	1R	A	W	SF^{[4]}	3R	A	A	A	A	A	A	A	W	A	A	3R	SF	QF	A	A	A	A	A	A	A	1R	A	A	QF	1R	2 / 11	30–8	79%
Win–loss	0–1	2–1	16–1	10–0	10–1	6–0	8–1	0–0	0–0	0–0	1–0	9–1	20–1	14–1	0–0	8–1	7–3	4–2	0–0	8–1	0–0	2–1	0–0	0–0	0–1	0–1	0–0	0–0	3–1	0–2	14 / 39	128–20	86%
Year-end championship
WTA Finals	DNQ		A	did not qualify									SF	A	did not qualify									NH	did not qualify						0 / 1	0–1	0%
National representation
Olympics	not held			G	not held			1R	not held			G	not held			G	not held			1R	not held				A	not held		A	not held		3 / 5	15–2	88%
Fed Cup	A	A	W	A	A	A	F	QF	SF	A	SF	A	A	A	A	A	PO^{[8]}	A	PO	PO	A	F	A	A	A	A	A	A	A	A	1 / 5	4–3	57%
Tier I, Premier Mandatory & Premier 5 tournaments
Qatar Open	not held				Tier III			Tier II				2R	not held		NTI	A	A	A	NTI	A	NTI	A	NTI	A	NTI	A	NTI	A	A	A	0 / 1	1–1	50%
Indian Wells Open	QF	QF	SF	A	A	A													A	A	A	A	A	NH	A	A	A	A	A	A	0 / 3	7–3	70%
Miami Open	A	1R	3R^{[3]}	A	A	A	A	A	A	A	A	A	A	A	A	A	A	A	A	A	A	A	A	NH	A	A	A	A	A	1R	0 / 3	1–2	33%
Madrid Open	not held												A	W	A	A	A	A	A	A	A	A	A	NH	A	A	A	A	A	2R	1 / 2	5–1	83%
Italian Open	A	SF	A	A	A	A	A	A	A	A	A	A	A	A	A	A	A	A	A	1R	A	2R^{[10]}	A	A	A	A	A	A	A	A	0 / 3	4–2	67%
Canadian Open	A	A	A	A	A	A	A	A	A	A	A	A	A	A	A	A	A	A	A	A	A	A	A	NH	A	A	A	A	A	1R	0 / 1	0–1	0%
Cincinnati Open	not held							Tier III					A	A	A	A	A	A	A	A	A	A	A	A	A	A	A	A	A	1R	0 / 1	0–1	0%
China Open	not held			Tier IV			Tier II						A	A	A	A	1R	A	A	A	A	A	A	not held				A	A	A	0 / 1	0–1	0%
Zurich Open	Q3	W	A	A	A	A	A	A	A	A	A	TII	not held																		1 / 1	4–0	100%
Kremlin Cup	A	QF^{[2]}	A	A	A	A	A	A	A	A	A	A	Premier											NH	500	not held					0 / 1	1–0	100%
Win–loss	2–1	10–3	4–1	0–0	0–0	0–0	0–0	0–0	0–0	0–0	0–0	1–1	0–0	4–0	0–0	0–0	0–1	0–0	0–0	0–1	0–0	1–0	0–0	0–0	0–0	0–0	0–0	0–0	0–0	1–4	2 / 17	23–12	66%
Career statistics
	1997	1998	1999	2000	2001	2002	2003	2004	2005	2006	2007	2008	2009	2010	2011	2012	2013	2014	2015	2016	2017	2018	2019	2020	2021	2022	2023	2024	2025	2026	Career		
Titles	0	2	3	2	1	1	1	0	0	0	0	2	4	3	0	2	0	0	0	1	0	0	0	0	0	0	0	0	0	0	22		
Finals	0	2	4	2	1	1	1	0	0	0	0	2	4	3	0	2	0	0	0	1	0	0	0	0	0	0	0	0	0	0	23		
Year-end ranking	121	36	10	54	54	–	–	–	–	–	–	23	3	11	–	31	63	133	–	31	–	201	–	–	1384	1327	–	–	147	163			

Notes

- ^{^{1}} 1998 Wimbledon Championships counts as neither a win or a loss. Kijimuta and Miyagi received a walkover in the first round after the Williams sisters retired.
- ^{^{2}} 1998 Kremlin Cup counts as 1 win, 0 loss. Kournikova and Seles received a walkover in the quarter-finals after the Williams sisters withdrew.
- ^{^{3}} 1999 Miami Open counts as 1 win, 0 loss. Farina and Habšudová received a walkover in the third round after the Williams sisters withdrew. (Note: The Williams sisters received a bye in the first round which counts as neither a win or a loss).
- ^{^{4}} 2000 US Open counts as 4 wins, 0 loss. Black and Likhovtseva received a walkover in the semi-finals after the Williams sisters withdrew.
- ^{^{5}} 2001 Wimbledon Championships counts as 2 wins, 0 loss. Navratilova and Sánchez Vicario received a walkover in the third round after the Williams sisters withdrew.
- ^{^{6}} 2007 Wimbledon Championships counts as 1 win, 0 loss. Medina Garrigues and Ruano Pascuel received a walkover in the second round after the Williams sisters withdrew.
- ^{^{7}} 2010 French Open counts as 5 wins, 0 loss. The Williams sisters received a walkover in the second round after Hantuchová and Wozniacki withdrew.
- ^{^{8}} 2013 Fed Cup counts as neither a win or loss. Arvidsson and Larsson received a walkover after Venus and Lepchenko withdrew.
- ^{^{9}} 2013 French Open counts as neither a win or loss. Kudryavtseva and Rodionova received a walkover in the first round after the Williams sisters withdrew.
- ^{^{10}} 2018 Italian Open counts as 1 win, 0 loss. Atawo and Grönefeld received a walkover in the second round after Venus and Keys withdrew.

==== Partners ====
Years	Partner
1997–2003, 2007–2010, 2012–2016, 2018, 2022, 2026	(United States) Serena Williams
2004	(United States) Chanda Rubin (Olympic Games)
2005	(United States) Corina Morariu (Fed Cup)
2007	(United States) Lisa Raymond (Fed Cup)
2008	(Denmark) Caroline Wozniacki (Qatar Open)
2012	(United States) Liezel Huber (Fed Cup)
2018	(United States) Madison Keys (Italian Open)
2019	(United Kingdom) Harriet Dart (Birmingham Classic)
2021	(United States) Coco Gauff (French Open)
2025	(United States) Hailey Baptiste (Washington Open)
2025–2026	(Canada) Leylah Fernandez
2026	(Ukraine) Elina Svitolina (ASB Classic)
2026	Ekaterina Alexandrova (Australian Open)
2026	(United States) Peyton Stearns (ATX Open)
2026	(United Kingdom) Katie Boulter (Madrid Open)
2026	(Philippines) Alexandra Eala *multiple tournaments*
2026	Diana Shnaider (Washington Open)
2026	(Indonesia) Janice Tjen (Guangzhou Open)
2026	(China) Xu Yifan (Hong Kong Open)

=== Mixed doubles ===
Tournament	1997	1998	1999	...	2005	2006	...	2016	...	2019	2020	2021	2022	...	2025	2026	SR	W–L
Grand Slam tournaments
Australian Open	A	W	A		A	A		A		A	1R	A	A		A	A	1 / 2	5–1
French Open	A	W	A		A	A		A		A	NH	A	A		A	A	1 / 1	6–0
Wimbledon	1R	SF	QF		3R	F		A		2R	NH	2R	2R		A	1R	0 / 9	15–8
US Open	A	QF	A		A	A		A		A	NH	A	A		1R	A	0 / 2	2–2
Win–loss	0–1	17–2	2–1		1–1	5–1		0–0		1–1	0–1	1–0	1–1		0–1	0–1	2 / 14	28–11
Olympic Games
Summer Olympics	not held / absent							F–S	not held / absent								0 / 1	3–1
WTA 1000 tournaments
Indian Wells Open	not held / absent														A	1R	0 / 1	0–1

==== Partners ====
Years	Partner
1997	(South Africa) Christo van Rensburg
1998–1999	(United States) Justin Gimelstob
2005	(The Bahamas) Mark Knowles
2006	(United States) Bob Bryan
2016	(United States) Rajeev Ram
2019	(United States) Frances Tiafoe
2020	(Colombia) Juan Sebastián Cabal
2021	(Australia) Nick Kyrgios
2022	(United Kingdom) Jamie Murray
2025	(United States) Reilly Opelka
2026	(United States) Christian Harrison
2026	(Germany) Kevin Krawietz

== Significant finals ==
=== Grand Slam finals ===
==== Singles: 16 (7 titles, 9 runner-ups) ====
Result	Year	Championship	Surface	Opponent	Score
Loss	1997	US Open	Hard	(Switzerland) Martina Hingis	0–6, 4–6
Win	2000	Wimbledon	Grass	(United States) Lindsay Davenport	6–3, 7–6^{(7–3)}
Win	2000	US Open	Hard	(United States) Lindsay Davenport	6–4, 7–5
Win	2001	Wimbledon (2)	Grass	(Belgium) Justine Henin	6–1, 3–6, 6–0
Win	2001	US Open (2)	Hard	(United States) Serena Williams	6–2, 6–4
Loss	2002	French Open	Clay	(United States) Serena Williams	5–7, 3–6
Loss	2002	Wimbledon	Grass	(United States) Serena Williams	6–7^{(4–7)}, 3–6
Loss	2002	US Open	Hard	(United States) Serena Williams	4–6, 3–6
Loss	2003	Australian Open	Hard	(United States) Serena Williams	6–7^{(4–7)}, 6–3, 4–6
Loss	2003	Wimbledon	Grass	(United States) Serena Williams	6–4, 4–6, 2–6
Win	2005	Wimbledon (3)	Grass	(United States) Lindsay Davenport	4–6, 7–6^{(7–4)}, 9–7
Win	2007	Wimbledon (4)	Grass	(France) Marion Bartoli	6–4, 6–1
Win	2008	Wimbledon (5)	Grass	(United States) Serena Williams	7–5, 6–4
Loss	2009	Wimbledon	Grass	(United States) Serena Williams	6–7^{(3–7)}, 2–6
Loss	2017	Australian Open	Hard	(United States) Serena Williams	4–6, 4–6
Loss	2017	Wimbledon	Grass	(Spain) Garbiñe Muguruza	5–7, 0–6

==== Doubles: 14 (14 titles) ====
Result	Year	Championship	Surface	Partner	Opponents	Score
Win	1999	French Open	Clay	(United States) Serena Williams	(Switzerland) Martina Hingis (Russia) Anna Kournikova	6–3, 6–7^{(2–7)}, 8–6
Win	1999	US Open	Hard	(United States) Serena Williams	(United States) Chanda Rubin (France) Sandrine Testud	4–6, 6–1, 6–4
Win	2000	Wimbledon	Grass	(United States) Serena Williams	(France) Julie Halard-Decugis (Japan) Ai Sugiyama	6–3, 6–2
Win	2001	Australian Open	Hard	(United States) Serena Williams	(United States) Lindsay Davenport (United States) Corina Morariu	6–2, 2–6, 6–4
Win	2002	Wimbledon (2)	Grass	(United States) Serena Williams	(Spain) Virginia Ruano Pascual (Argentina) Paola Suárez	6–2, 7–5
Win	2003	Australian Open (2)	Hard	(United States) Serena Williams	(Spain) Virginia Ruano Pascual (Argentina) Paola Suárez	4–6, 6–4, 6–3
Win	2008	Wimbledon (3)	Grass	(United States) Serena Williams	(United States) Lisa Raymond (Australia) Samantha Stosur	6–2, 6–2
Win	2009	Australian Open (3)	Hard	(United States) Serena Williams	(Slovakia) Daniela Hantuchová (Japan) Ai Sugiyama	6–3, 6–3
Win	2009	Wimbledon (4)	Grass	(United States) Serena Williams	(Australia) Samantha Stosur (Australia) Rennae Stubbs	7–6^{(7–4)}, 6–4
Win	2009	US Open (2)	Hard	(United States) Serena Williams	(Zimbabwe) Cara Black (United States) Liezel Huber	6–2, 6–2
Win	2010	Australian Open (4)	Hard	(United States) Serena Williams	(Zimbabwe) Cara Black (United States) Liezel Huber	6–4, 6–3
Win	2010	French Open (2)	Clay	(United States) Serena Williams	(Czech Republic) Květa Peschke (Slovenia) Katarina Srebotnik	6–2, 6–3
Win	2012	Wimbledon (5)	Grass	(United States) Serena Williams	(Czech Republic) Andrea Hlaváčková (Czech Republic) Lucie Hradecká	7–5, 6–4
Win	2016	Wimbledon (6)	Grass	(United States) Serena Williams	(Hungary) Tímea Babos (Kazakhstan) Yaroslava Shvedova	6–3, 6–4

==== Mixed doubles: 3 (2 titles, 1 runner-up) ====
Result	Year	Championship	Surface	Partner	Opponents	Score
Win	1998	Australian Open	Hard	(United States) Justin Gimelstob	(Czechoslovakia) Helena Suková (Czechoslovakia) Cyril Suk	6–2, 6–1
Win	1998	French Open	Clay	(United States) Justin Gimelstob	(United States) Serena Williams (Argentina) Luis Lobo	6–4, 6–4
Loss	2006	Wimbledon	Grass	(United States) Bob Bryan	(Russia) Vera Zvonareva (Israel) Andy Ram	3–6, 2–6

=== Olympic finals ===
==== Singles: 1 (gold medal) ====
Result	Year	Tournament	Surface	Opponent	Score
Gold	2000	Sydney Olympics	Hard	(Russia) Elena Dementieva	6–2, 6–4

==== Doubles: 3 (3 gold medals) ====
Result	Year	Tournament	Surface	Partner	Opponents	Score
Gold	2000	Sydney Olympics	Hard	(United States) Serena Williams	(Netherlands) Kristie Boogert; (Netherlands) Miriam Oremans	6–1, 6–1
Gold	2008	Beijing Olympics	Hard	(United States) Serena Williams	(Spain) Anabel Medina Garrigues; (Spain) Virginia Ruano Pascual	6–2, 6–0
Gold	2012	London Olympics	Grass	(United States) Serena Williams	(Czech Republic) Andrea Hlaváčková; (Czech Republic) Lucie Hradecká	6–4, 6–4

==== Mixed doubles: 1 (silver medal) ====
Result	Year	Tournament	Surface	Partner	Opponents	Score
Silver	2016	Rio de Janeiro Olympics	Hard	(United States) Rajeev Ram	(United States) Bethanie Mattek-Sands; (United States) Jack Sock	7–6^{(7–3)}, 1–6, [7–10]

=== Year-end championship finals ===
==== Singles: 3 (1 title, 2 runner-ups) ====
Result	Year	Championship	Surface	Opponent	Score
Win	2008	WTA Finals, Doha, Qatar	Hard	(Russia) Vera Zvonareva	6–7^{(5–7)}, 6–0, 6–2
Loss	2009	WTA Finals, Doha, Qatar	Hard	(United States) Serena Williams	2–6, 6–7^{(4–7)}
Loss	2017	WTA Finals, Kallang, Singapore	Hard (i)	(Denmark) Caroline Wozniacki	4–6, 4–6

==== Singles: 2 (1 title, 1 runner-up) ====
Result	Year	Tournament	Surface	Opponent	Score
Win	1998	Grand Slam Cup, Germany	Hard (i)	(Switzerland) Patty Schnyder	6–2, 3–6, 6–2
Loss	1999	Grand Slam Cup, Germany	Hard (i)	(United States) Serena Williams	1–6, 6–3, 3–6

==== Singles: 1 (1 title) ====
Result	Year	Tournament	Surface	Opponent	Score
Win	2015	WTA Elite Trophy, Zhuhai, China	Hard (i)	(Czech Republic) Karolína Plíšková	7–5, 7–6^{(8–6)}

=== Tier-I / Premier-Mandatory & Premier-5 finals ===
==== Singles: 15 (9 titles, 6 runner-ups) ====
Result	Year	Tournament	Surface	Opponent	Score
Win	1998	Miami Open	Hard	(Russia) Anna Kournikova	2–6, 6–4, 6–1
Loss	1998	Italian Open	Clay	(Switzerland) Martina Hingis	3–6, 6–2, 3–6
Loss	1998	Zürich Open	Carpet (i)	(United States) Lindsay Davenport	5–7, 3–6
Win	1999	Miami Open (2)	Hard	(United States) Serena Williams	6–1, 4–6, 6–4
Win	1999	Italian Open	Clay	(France) Mary Pierce	6–4, 6–2
Win	1999	Zürich Open	Hard (i)	(Switzerland) Martina Hingis	6–3, 6–4
Win	2001	Miami Open (3)	Hard	(United States) Jennifer Capriati	4–6, 6–1, 7–6^{(7–4)}
Win	2004	Charleston Open	Clay	(Spain) Conchita Martínez	2–6, 6–2, 6–1
Loss	2004	German Open	Clay	(France) Amélie Mauresmo	w/o
Win	2009	Dubai Championships	Hard	(France) Virginie Razzano	6–4, 6–2
Win	2010	Dubai Championships (2)	Hard	(Belarus) Victoria Azarenka	6–3, 7–5
Loss	2010	Miami Open	Hard	(Belgium) Kim Clijsters	2–6, 1–6
Loss	2010	Madrid Open	Clay	(France) Aravane Rezaï	2–6, 5–7
Loss	2014	Canadian Open	Hard	(Poland) Agnieszka Radwańska	4–6, 2–6
Win	2015	Wuhan Open	Hard	(Spain) Garbiñe Muguruza	6–3, 3–0 ret.

==== Doubles: 2 finals (2 titles) ====
Result	Year	Tournament	Surface	Partner	Opponents	Score
Win	1998	Zurich Open	Carpet (i)	(United States) Serena Williams	(South Africa) Mariaan de Swardt (Ukraine) Elena Tatarkova	5–7, 6–1, 6–3
Win	2010	Madrid Open	Clay	(United States) Serena Williams	(Argentina) Gisela Dulko (Italy) Flavia Pennetta	6–2, 7–5

== WTA career finals ==
=== Singles: 83 (49 titles, 34 runner–ups) ===
Legend (pre/post 2009) Grand Slam tournaments (7–9) Summer Olympics (1–0) WTA Finals (1–2) WTA Elite Trophy (1–0) Grand Slam Cup (1–1) Tier I / Premier Mandatory & Premier 5 (9–6) Tier II / Premier (18–13) Tier III, IV & V / International (11–3)	Finals by surface Hard (31–19) Clay (9–6) Grass (5–4) Carpet (4–5)	Finals by setting Indoor (10–7) Outdoor (39–27)

Result	W–L	Date	Tournament	Tier	Surface	Opponent	Score
Loss	0–1	Sep 1997	US Open, United States	Grand Slam	Hard	(Switzerland) Martina Hingis	0–6, 4–6
Loss	0–2	Jan 1998	Sydney International, Australia	Tier II	Hard	(Spain) Arantxa Sánchez Vicario	1–6, 3–6
Win	1–2	Feb 1998	U.S. National Indoor, United States	Tier III	Hard (i)	(South Africa) Joannette Kruger	6–3, 6–2
Win	2–2	Mar 1998	Miami Open, United States	Tier I	Hard	(Russia) Anna Kournikova	2–6, 6–4, 6–1
Loss	2–3	May 1998	Italian Open, Italy	Tier I	Clay	(Switzerland) Martina Hingis	3–6, 6–2, 3–6
Loss	2–4	Jul 1998	Silicon Valley Classic, United States	Tier II	Hard	(United States) Lindsay Davenport	4–6, 7–5, 4–6
Win	3–4	Oct 1998	Grand Slam Cup, Germany	GS Cup	Hard	(Switzerland) Patty Schnyder	6–2, 3–6, 6–2
Loss	3–5	Oct 1998	Zurich Open, Switzerland	Tier I	Carpet (i)	(United States) Lindsay Davenport	5–7, 3–6
Loss	3–6	Feb 1999	Faber Grand Prix, Germany	Tier II	Carpet (i)	(Czech Republic) Jana Novotná	4–6, 4–6
Win	4–6	Feb 1999	U.S. National Indoor, United States (2)	Tier III	Hard (i)	(South Africa) Amanda Coetzer	6–4, 6–0
Win	5–6	Mar 1999	Miami Open, United States (2)	Tier I	Hard	(United States) Serena Williams	6–1, 4–6, 6–4
Win	6–6	May 1999	WTA Hamburg, Germany	Tier II	Clay	(France) Mary Pierce	6–0, 6–3
Win	7–6	May 1999	Italian Open, Italy	Tier I	Clay	(France) Mary Pierce	6–4, 6–2
Loss	7–7	Jul 1999	Silicon Valley Classic, United States	Tier II	Hard	(United States) Lindsay Davenport	6–7^{(1–7)}, 2–6
Loss	7–8	Aug 1999	Southern California Open, United States	Tier II	Hard	(Switzerland) Martina Hingis	4–6, 0–6
Win	8–8	Aug 1999	Connecticut Open, United States	Tier II	Hard	(United States) Lindsay Davenport	6–2, 7–5
Loss	8–9	Oct 1999	Grand Slam Cup, Germany	GS Cup	Hard (i)	(United States) Serena Williams	1–6, 6–3, 3–6
Win	9–9	Oct 1999	Zurich Open, Switzerland	Tier I	Hard (i)	(Switzerland) Martina Hingis	6–3, 6–4
Win	10–9	Jun 2000	Wimbledon, United Kingdom	Grand Slam	Grass	(United States) Lindsay Davenport	6–3, 7–6^{(7–3)}
Win	11–9	Jul 2000	Silicon Valley Classic, United States	Tier II	Hard	(United States) Lindsay Davenport	6–1, 6–4
Win	12–9	Aug 2000	Southern California Open, United States	Tier II	Hard	(United States) Monica Seles	6–0, 6–7^{(3–7)}, 6–3
Win	13–9	Aug 2000	Connecticut Open, United States (2)	Tier II	Hard	(United States) Monica Seles	6–2, 6–4
Win	14–9	Aug 2000	US Open, United States	Grand Slam	Hard	(United States) Lindsay Davenport	6–4, 7–5
Win	15–9	Sep 2000	Summer Olympics, Australia	Olympics	Hard	(Russia) Elena Dementieva	6–2, 6–4
Loss	15–10	Oct 2000	Linz Open, Austria	Tier II	Carpet (i)	(United States) Lindsay Davenport	4–6, 6–3, 2–6
Win	16–10	Mar 2001	Miami Open, United States (3)	Tier I	Hard	(United States) Jennifer Capriati	4–6, 6–1, 7–6^{(7–4)}
Win	17–10	May 2001	WTA Hamburg, Germany (2)	Tier II	Clay	(United States) Meghann Shaughnessy	6–3, 6–0
Win	18–10	Jun 2001	Wimbledon, United Kingdom (2)	Grand Slam	Grass	(Belgium) Justine Henin	6–1, 3–6, 6–0
Win	19–10	Aug 2001	Southern California Open, United States (2)	Tier II	Hard	(United States) Monica Seles	6–2, 6–3
Win	20–10	Aug 2001	Connecticut Open, United States (3)	Tier II	Hard	(United States) Lindsay Davenport	7–6^{(8–6)}, 6–4
Win	21–10	Aug 2001	US Open, United States (2)	Grand Slam	Hard	(United States) Serena Williams	6–2, 6–4
Win	22–10	Jan 2002	Gold Coast International, Australia	Tier III	Hard	(Belgium) Justine Henin	7–5, 6–2
Win	23–10	Feb 2002	Open GDF Suez, France	Tier II	Carpet (i)	(Serbia and Montenegro) Jelena Dokić	walkover
Win	24–10	Feb 2002	Diamond Games, Belgium	Tier II	Carpet (i)	(Belgium) Justine Henin	6–3, 5–7, 6–3
Win	25–10	Apr 2002	Amelia Island Championships, United States	Tier II	Clay	(Belgium) Justine Henin	2–6, 7–5, 7–6^{(7–5)}
Loss	25–11	May 2002	WTA Hamburg, Germany	Tier II	Clay	(Belgium) Kim Clijsters	6–1, 3–6, 4–6
Loss	25–12	Jun 2002	French Open, France	Grand Slam	Clay	(United States) Serena Williams	5–7, 3–6
Loss	25–13	Jul 2002	Wimbledon, United Kingdom	Grand Slam	Grass	(United States) Serena Williams	6–7^{(4–7)}, 3–6
Win	26–13	Jul 2002	Silicon Valley Classic, United States (2)	Tier II	Hard	(Belgium) Kim Clijsters	6–3, 6–3
Win	27–13	Aug 2002	Southern California Open, United States (3)	Tier II	Hard	(Serbia and Montenegro) Jelena Dokić	6–2, 6–2
Win	28–13	Aug 2002	Connecticut Open, United States (4)	Tier II	Hard	(United States) Lindsay Davenport	7–5, 6–0
Loss	28–14	Sep 2002	US Open, United States	Grand Slam	Hard	(United States) Serena Williams	4–6, 3–6
Loss	28–15	Jan 2003	Australian Open, Australia	Grand Slam	Hard	(United States) Serena Williams	6–7^{(4–7)}, 6–3, 4–6
Win	29–15	Feb 2003	Diamond Games, Belgium (2)	Tier II	Carpet (i)	(Belgium) Kim Clijsters	6–2, 6–4
Loss	29–16	May 2003	Warsaw Open, Poland	Tier II	Clay	(France) Amélie Mauresmo	7–6^{(8–6)}, 0–6, 0–3 ret.
Loss	29–17	Jul 2003	Wimbledon, United Kingdom	Grand Slam	Grass	(United States) Serena Williams	6–4, 4–6, 2–6
Win	30–17	Apr 2004	Charleston Open, United States	Tier I	Clay	(Spain) Conchita Martínez	2–6, 6–2, 6–1
Win	31–17	May 2004	Warsaw Open, Poland	Tier II	Clay	(Russia) Svetlana Kuznetsova	6–1, 6–4
Loss	31–18	May 2004	German Open, Germany	Tier I	Clay	(France) Amélie Mauresmo	walkover
Loss	31–19	Jul 2004	Silicon Valley Classic, United States	Tier II	Hard	(United States) Lindsay Davenport	6–7^{(4–7)}, 7–5, 6–7^{(4–7)}
Loss	31–20	Feb 2005	Diamond Games, Belgium	Tier II	Carpet (i)	(France) Amélie Mauresmo	6–4, 5–7, 4–6
Win	32–20	May 2005	İstanbul Cup, Turkey	Tier III	Clay	(Czech Republic) Nicole Vaidišová	6–3, 6–2
Win	33–20	Jul 2005	Wimbledon, United Kingdom (3)	Grand Slam	Grass	(United States) Lindsay Davenport	4–6, 7–6^{(7–4)}, 9–7
Loss	33–21	Jul 2005	Silicon Valley Classic, United States	Tier II	Hard	(Belgium) Kim Clijsters	5–7, 2–6
Win	34–21	Feb 2007	U.S. National Indoor, United States (3)	Tier III	Carpet (i)	(Israel) Shahar Pe'er	6–1, 6–1
Win	35–21	Jul 2007	Wimbledon, United Kingdom (4)	Grand Slam	Grass	(France) Marion Bartoli	6–4, 6–1
Win	36–21	Sep 2007	Korea Open, South Korea	Tier IV	Hard	(Russia) Maria Kirilenko	6–3, 1–6, 6–4
Loss	36–22	Oct 2007	Japan Open, Japan	Tier III	Hard	(France) Virginie Razzano	6–4, 6–7^{(7–9)}, 4–6
Win	37–22	Jul 2008	Wimbledon, United Kingdom (5)	Grand Slam	Grass	(United States) Serena Williams	7–5, 6–4
Win	38–22	Oct 2008	Zurich Open, Switzerland (2)	Tier II	Hard (i)	(Italy) Flavia Pennetta	7–6^{(7–1)}, 6–2
Win	39–22	Nov 2008	WTA Finals, Qatar	WTA Finals	Hard	(Russia) Vera Zvonareva	6–7^{(5–7)}, 6–0, 6–2
Win	40–22	Feb 2009	Dubai Championships, UAE	Premier 5	Hard	(France) Virginie Razzano	6–4, 6–2
Win	41–22	Feb 2009	Mexican Open, Mexico	International	Clay	(Italy) Flavia Pennetta	6–1, 6–2
Loss	41–23	Jul 2009	Wimbledon, United Kingdom	Grand Slam	Grass	(United States) Serena Williams	6–7^{(3–7)}, 2–6
Loss	41–24	Aug 2009	Silicon Valley Classic, United States	Premier	Hard	(France) Marion Bartoli	2–6, 7–5, 4–6
Loss	41–25	Nov 2009	WTA Finals, Qatar	WTA Finals	Hard	(United States) Serena Williams	2–6, 6–7^{(4–7)}
Win	42–25	Feb 2010	Dubai Championships, UAE (2)	Premier 5	Hard	(Belarus) Victoria Azarenka	6–3, 7–5
Win	43–25	Feb 2010	Mexican Open, Mexico (2)	International	Clay	(Slovenia) Polona Hercog	2–6, 6–2, 6–3
Loss	43–26	Apr 2010	Miami Open, United States	Premier M	Hard	(Belgium) Kim Clijsters	2–6, 1–6
Loss	43–27	May 2010	Madrid Open, Spain	Premier M	Clay	(France) Aravane Rezaï	2–6, 5–7
Win	44–27	Oct 2012	Luxembourg Open, Luxembourg	International	Hard (i)	(Romania) Monica Niculescu	6–2, 6–3
Loss	44–28	Jan 2014	Auckland Open, New Zealand	International	Hard	(Serbia) Ana Ivanovic	2–6, 7–5, 4–6
Win	45–28	Feb 2014	Dubai Championships, UAE (3)	Premier	Hard	(France) Alizé Cornet	6–3, 6–0
Loss	45–29	Aug 2014	Canadian Open, Canada	Premier 5	Hard	(Poland) Agnieszka Radwańska	4–6, 2–6
Loss	45–30	Sep 2014	Tournoi de Québec, Canada	International	Carpet (i)	(Croatia) Mirjana Lučić-Baroni	4–6, 3–6
Win	46–30	Jan 2015	Auckland Open, New Zealand	International	Hard	(Denmark) Caroline Wozniacki	2–6, 6–3, 6–3
Win	47–30	Oct 2015	Wuhan Open, China	Premier 5	Hard	(Spain) Garbiñe Muguruza	6–3, 3–0 ret.
Win	48–30	Nov 2015	WTA Elite Trophy, China	Elite Trophy	Hard (i)	(Czech Republic) Karolína Plíšková	7–5, 7–6^{(8–6)}
Win	49–30	Feb 2016	Taiwan Open, Taiwan	International	Hard	(Japan) Misaki Doi	6–4, 6–2
Loss	49–31	Jul 2016	Silicon Valley Classic, United States	Premier	Hard	(United Kingdom) Johanna Konta	5–7, 7–5, 2–6
Loss	49–32	Jan 2017	Australian Open, Australia	Grand Slam	Hard	(United States) Serena Williams	4–6, 4–6
Loss	49–33	Jul 2017	Wimbledon, United Kingdom	Grand Slam	Grass	(Spain) Garbiñe Muguruza	5–7, 0–6
Loss	49–34	Oct 2017	WTA Finals, Singapore	WTA Finals	Hard (i)	(Denmark) Caroline Wozniacki	4–6, 4–6

=== Doubles: 23 (22 titles, 1 runner-up) ===
Legend (pre/post 2009) Grand Slam tournaments (14–0) WTA Tour Finals (0–0) Olympic Games (3–0) Tier I / Premier Mandatory & Premier 5 (2–0) Tier II / Premier (2–1) Tier III, IV & V / International (1–0)	Finals by surface Hard (10–1) Grass (7–0) Clay (3–0) Carpet (2–0)	Finals by setting Indoor (3–0) Outdoor (19–1)

Result	W–L	Date	Tournament	Tier	Surface	Partner	Opponents	Score
Win	1–0	Feb 1998	U.S. National Indoor, United States	Tier III	Hard (i)	(United States) Serena Williams	(Romania) Cătălina Cristea; (Australia) Kristine Kunce	7–5, 6–2
Win	2–0	Oct 1998	Zurich Open, Switzerland	Tier I	Carpet (i)	(United States) Serena Williams	(South Africa) Mariaan de Swardt; (Ukraine) Elena Tatarkova	5–7, 6–1, 6–3
Win	3–0	Feb 1999	Faber Grand Prix, Germany	Tier II	Carpet (i)	(United States) Serena Williams	(France) Alexandra Fusai; (France) Nathalie Tauziat	5–7, 6–2, 6–2
Win	4–0	May 1999	French Open, France	Grand Slam	Clay	(United States) Serena Williams	(Switzerland) Martina Hingis; (Russia) Anna Kournikova	6–3, 6–7^{(2–7)}, 8–6
Loss	4–1	Aug 1999	Southern California Open, United States	Tier II	Hard	(United States) Serena Williams	(United States) Lindsay Davenport; (United States) Corina Morariu	4–6, 1–6
Win	5–1	Aug 1999	US Open, United States	Grand Slam	Hard	(United States) Serena Williams	(United States) Chanda Rubin; (France) Sandrine Testud	4–6, 6–1, 6–4
Win	6–1	Jun 2000	Wimbledon, United Kingdom	Grand Slam	Grass	(United States) Serena Williams	(France) Julie Halard-Decugis; (Japan) Ai Sugiyama	6–3, 6–2
Win	7–1	Sep 2000	Summer Olympics, Australia	Olympics	Hard	(United States) Serena Williams	(Netherlands) Kristie Boogert; (Netherlands) Miriam Oremans	6–1, 6–1
Win	8–1	Jan 2001	Australian Open, Australia	Grand Slam	Hard	(United States) Serena Williams	(United States) Lindsay Davenport (United States) Corina Morariu	6–2, 4–6, 6–4
Win	9–1	Jun 2002	Wimbledon, United Kingdom (2)	Grand Slam	Grass	(United States) Serena Williams	(Spain) Virginia Ruano Pascual; (Argentina) Paola Suárez	6–2, 7–5
Win	10–1	Jan 2003	Australian Open, Australia (2)	Grand Slam	Hard	(United States) Serena Williams	(Spain) Virginia Ruano Pascual (Argentina) Paola Suárez	4–6, 6–4, 6–3
Win	11–1	Jul 2008	Wimbledon, United Kingdom (3)	Grand Slam	Grass	(United States) Serena Williams	(United States) Lisa Raymond; (Australia) Samantha Stosur	6–2, 6–2
Win	12–1	Aug 2008	Summer Olympics, China (2)	Olympics	Hard	(United States) Serena Williams	(Spain) Anabel Medina Garrigues (Spain) Virginia Ruano Pascual	6–2, 6–0
Win	13–1	Jan 2009	Australian Open, Australia (3)	Grand Slam	Hard	(United States) Serena Williams	(Japan) Ai Sugiyama (Slovakia) Daniela Hantuchová	6–3, 6–3
Win	14–1	Jul 2009	Wimbledon, United Kingdom (4)	Grand Slam	Grass	(United States) Serena Williams	(Australia) Samantha Stosur (Australia) Rennae Stubbs	7–6^{(7–4)}, 6–4
Win	15–1	Aug 2009	Stanford Classic, United States	Premier	Hard	(United States) Serena Williams	(Chinese Taipei) Chan Yung-jan; (Romania) Monica Niculescu	6–4, 6–1
Win	16–1	Sep 2009	US Open, United States (2)	Grand Slam	Hard	(United States) Serena Williams	(Zimbabwe) Cara Black; (United States) Liezel Huber	6–2, 6–2
Win	17–1	Jan 2010	Australian Open, Australia (4)	Grand Slam	Hard	(United States) Serena Williams	(Zimbabwe) Cara Black (United States) Liezel Huber	6–4, 6–3
Win	18–1	May 2010	Madrid Open, Spain	Premier M	Clay	(United States) Serena Williams	(Argentina) Gisela Dulko; (Italy) Flavia Pennetta	6–2, 7–5
Win	19–1	Jun 2010	French Open, France (2)	Grand Slam	Clay	(United States) Serena Williams	(Czech Republic) Květa Peschke; (Slovenia) Katarina Srebotnik	6–2, 6–3
Win	20–1	Jul 2012	Wimbledon, United Kingdom (5)	Grand Slam	Grass	(United States) Serena Williams	(Czech Republic) Andrea Hlaváčková; (Czech Republic) Lucie Hradecká	7–5, 6–4
Win	21–1	Aug 2012	Summer Olympics, United Kingdom (3)	Olympics	Grass	(United States) Serena Williams	(Czech Republic) Andrea Hlaváčková (Czech Republic) Lucie Hradecká	6–4, 6–4
Win	22–1	Jul 2016	Wimbledon, United Kingdom (6)	Grand Slam	Grass	(United States) Serena Williams	(Hungary) Tímea Babos; (Kazakhstan) Yaroslava Shvedova	6–3, 6–4

== Fed Cup participation ==
Current through the 2020 Fed Cup qualifying round

Group membership World Group (21–5) World Group Play-off (1–0) World Group II (3–0)	Matches by surface Hard (17–3) Clay (8–2) Grass (0–0)	Matches by type Singles (21–2) Doubles (4–3)	Matches by location United States (17–3) Away (8–2)

=== Singles (21–2) ===
Edition	Round	Date	Location	Opponent nation	Surface	Opponent player	Result	Score	Team result
1999	WG SF	Jul 1999	Ancona, Italy	Italy	Clay	Rita Grande	Win	6–2, 6–3	Win 4–1
1999	WG SF	Jul 1999	Ancona, Italy	Italy	Clay	Silvia Farina	Win	6–1, 6–1	Win 4–1
1999	WG F	Sep 1999	Stanford, United States	Russia	Hard	Elena Likhovtseva	Win	6–3, 6–4	Win 4–1
1999	WG F	Sep 1999	Stanford, United States	Russia	Hard	Elena Dementieva	Loss	6–1, 3–6, 6–7^{(5–7)}	Win 4–1
2003	WG 1R	Apr 2003	Lowell, United States	Czech Republic	Hard (i)	Dája Bedáňová	Win	6–1, 6–0	Win 5–0
2003	WG 1R	Apr 2003	Lowell, United States	Czech Republic	Hard (i)	Iveta Benešová	Win	6–3, 6–2	Win 5–0
2004	WG 1R	Apr 2004	Portorož, Slovenia	Slovenia	Clay	Katarina Srebotnik	Win	6–1, 6–2	Win 4–1
2004	WG 1R	Apr 2004	Portorož, Slovenia	Slovenia	Clay	Tina Pisnik	Win	6–3, 6–1	Win 4–1
2005	WG 1R	Apr 2005	Delray Beach, United States	Belgium	Hard	Els Callens	Win	6–2, 6–2	Win 5–0
2005	WG 1R	Apr 2005	Delray Beach, United States	Belgium	Hard	Leslie Butkiewicz	Win	6–1, 6–4	Win 5–0
2005	WG SF	Jul 2005	Moscow, Russia	Russia	Clay (i)	Anastasia Myskina	Loss	7–5, 4–6, 2–6	Loss 1–4
2005	WG SF	Jul 2005	Moscow, Russia	Russia	Clay (i)	Elena Dementieva	Win	6–1, 6–2	Loss 1–4
2007	WG 1R	Apr 2007	Delray Beach, United States	Belgium	Hard	Kirsten Flipkens	Win	7–5, 6–2	Win 5–0
2007	WG 1R	Apr 2007	Delray Beach, United States	Belgium	Hard	Yanina Wickmayer	Win	6–1, 6–2	Win 5–0
2007	WG SF	Jul 2007	Stowe, United States	Russia	Hard	Nadia Petrova	Win	7–6^{(8–6)}, 0–6, 6–4	Loss 2–3
2007	WG SF	Jul 2007	Stowe, United States	Russia	Hard	Anna Chakvetadze	Win	6–1, 6–4	Loss 2–3
2013	WG PO	Apr 2013	Delray Beach, United States	Sweden	Hard	Johanna Larsson	Win	6–3, 7–5	Win 3–2
2015	WG II	Feb 2015	Buenos Aires, Argentina	Argentina	Clay	Paula Ormaechea	Win	6–3, 6–2	Win 4–1
2015	WG II	Feb 2015	Buenos Aires, Argentina	Argentina	Clay	María Irigoyen	Win	6–1, 6–4	Win 4–1
2016	WG II	Feb 2016	Kailua-Kona, United States	Poland	Hard	Paula Kania	Win	7–5, 6–2	Win 4–0
2016	WG II	Feb 2016	Kailua-Kona, United States	Poland	Hard	Magda Linette	Win	6–1, 6–2	Win 4–0
2018	WG QF	Feb 2018	Asheville, United States	Netherlands	Hard (i)	Arantxa Rus	Win	6–1, 6–4	Win 3–1
2018	WG QF	Feb 2018	Asheville, United States	Netherlands	Hard (i)	Richèl Hogenkamp	Win	7–5, 6–1	Win 3–1

=== Doubles (4–3) ===
Edition	Round	Date	Location	Opponent nation	Surface	Partner	Opponent players	Result	Score	Team result
1999	WG SF	Jul 1999	Ancona, Italy	Italy	Clay	Serena Williams	Tathiana Garbin; Adriana Serra Zanetti	Win	6–2, 6–2	Win 4–1
1999	WG F	Sep 1999	Stanford, United States	Russia	Hard	Serena Williams	Elena Dementieva; Elena Makarova	Win	6–2, 6–1	Win 4–1
2003	WG 1R	Apr 2003	Lowell, United States	Czech Republic	Hard (i)	Serena Williams	Dája Bedáňová; Eva Birnerová	Win	6–0, 6–1	Win 5–0
2005	WG SF	Jul 2005	Moscow, Russia	Russia	Clay (i)	Corina Morariu	Vera Dushevina; Dinara Safina	Loss	1–6, 5–7	Loss 1–4
2007	WG SF	Jul 2007	Stowe, United States	Russia	Hard	Lisa Raymond	Nadia Petrova; Elena Vesnina	Loss	5–7, 6–7^{(1–7)}	Loss 2–3
2012	WG II	Feb 2012	Worcester, United States	Belarus	Hard (i)	Liezel Huber	Darya Kustova; Anastasiya Yakimova	Win	6–1, 6–2	Win 5–0
2018	WG QF	Feb 2018	Asheville, United States	Netherlands	Hard (i)	Serena Williams	Lesley Kerkhove; Demi Schuurs	Loss	2–6, 3–6	Win 3–1

==== Finals: 1 (1 title) ====
Edition	(United States) USA team	Rounds/Opponents
1999 Fed Cup	Venus Williams; Serena Williams; Monica Seles; Chanda Rubin; Lindsay Davenport	QF: (Croatia) 0–5 (United States); SF: (Italy) 1–4 (United States); F: (United States) 4–1 (Russia)

== Top 10 wins ==
Williams has a 138–107 record against players who were, at the time the match was played, ranked in the top 10.

Season	1997	1998	1999	2000	2001	2002	2003	2004	2005	2006	2007	2008	2009	2010	2011	2012	2013	2014	2015	2016	2017	2018	2019	2020	2021	2022	2023	Total
Wins	2	10	18	12	14	16	6	0	6	2	8	9	6	4	0	5	1	3	7	0	7	0	2	0	0	0	0	138

Grand Slam WTA Finals / Grand Slam Cup Tier I / Premier Mandatory & Premier 5 Tier II / Premier Tier III, IV & V / International

#	Player	Rank	Event	Surface	Round	Score	VW Rank
1997
1.	(Croatia) Iva Majoli	No. 9	Indian Wells, United States	Hard	4th round	7–5, 3–6, 7–5	No. 211
2.	(Germany) Anke Huber	No. 8	US Open, United States	Hard	4th round	6–3, 6–4	No. 66
1998
3.	(Switzerland) Martina Hingis	No. 1	Sydney, Australia	Hard	2nd round	3–6, 6–4, 7–5	No. 21
4.	(United States) Lindsay Davenport	No. 2	Oklahoma City, United States	Hard	Semifinals	6–7^{(5–7)}, 6–2, 6–3	No. 14
5.	(Switzerland) Martina Hingis	No. 1	Miami, United States	Hard	Semifinals	6–2, 5–7, 6–2	No. 11
6.	(Spain) Arantxa Sánchez Vicario	No. 5	Rome, Italy	Clay	Semifinals	6–3, 2–6, 7–5	No. 9
7.	(United States) Monica Seles	No. 6	Stanford, United States	Hard	Semifinals	6–3, 6–4	No. 5
8.	(Spain) Arantxa Sánchez Vicario	No. 4	US Open, United States	Hard	Quarterfinals	2–6, 6–1, 6–1	No. 5
9.	(Spain) Arantxa Sánchez Vicario	No. 4	Grand Slam Cup, Munich, Germany	Hard (i)	Quarterfinals	6–3, 6–2	No. 5
10.	(France) Nathalie Tauziat	No. 8	Grand Slam Cup, Munich, Germany	Hard (i)	Semifinals	6–4, 6–0	No. 5
11.	(Switzerland) Patty Schnyder	No. 9	Grand Slam Cup, Munich, Germany	Hard (i)	Final	6–2, 3–6, 6–2	No. 5
12.	(France) Nathalie Tauziat	No. 8	Zurich, Switzerland	Hard (i)	Semifinals	6–3, 6–4	No. 5
1999
13.	(Germany) Steffi Graf	No. 7	Hanover, Germany	Hard (i)	Semifinals	6–3, 3–6, 6–3	No. 6
14.	(South Africa) Amanda Coetzer	No. 10	Oklahoma City, United States	Hard (i)	Semifinals	4–6, 6–2, 6–3	No. 5
15.	(Czech Republic) Jana Novotná	No. 4	Miami, United States	Hard (i)	Quarterfinals	5–7, 6–2, 6–3	No. 6
16.	(Germany) Steffi Graf	No. 7	Miami, United States	Hard (i)	Semifinals	6–2, 6–4	No. 6
17.	(Spain) Arantxa Sánchez Vicario	No. 6	Hamburg, Germany	Clay	Semifinals	6–1, 6–3	No. 7
18.	(France) Mary Pierce	No. 8	Hamburg, Germany	Clay	Final	6–0, 6–3	No. 7
19.	(Switzerland) Martina Hingis	No. 1	Rome, Italy	Clay	Semifinals	6–4, 1–6, 6–4	No. 5
20.	(France) Mary Pierce	No. 8	Rome, Italy	Clay	Final	6–4, 6–2	No. 5
21.	(South Africa) Amanda Coetzer	No. 9	Stanford, United States	Hard	Semifinals	6–1, 6–4	No. 4
23.	(United States) Monica Seles	No. 5	New Haven, United States	Hard	Semifinals	6–1, 6–3	No. 4
24.	(United States) Lindsay Davenport	No. 2	New Haven, United States	Hard	Final	6–2, 7–5	No. 4
25.	(Austria) Barbara Schett	No. 8	Grand Slam Cup, Munich, Germany	Hard (i)	Quarterfinals	6–3, 6–4	No. 3
26.	(Switzerland) Martina Hingis	No. 1	Grand Slam Cup, Munich, Germany	Hard (i)	Semifinals	6–2, 6–7^{(6–8)}, 9–7	No. 3
27.	(France) Julie Halard-Decugis	No. 9	Zurich, Switzerland	Hard (i)	Quarterfinals	6–2, 6–3	No. 3
28.	(France) Mary Pierce	No. 6	Zurich, Switzerland	Hard (i)	Semifinals	6–4, 6–4	No. 3
29.	(Switzerland) Martina Hingis	No. 1	Zurich, Switzerland	Hard (i)	Final	6–3, 6–4	No. 3
30.	(Austria) Barbara Schett	No. 8	WTA Tour Championships, New York, U.S.	Hard (i)	Quarterfinals	6–4, 7–6^{(7–2)}	No. 3
2000
31.	(Switzerland) Martina Hingis	No. 1	Wimbledon, United Kingdom	Grass	Quarterfinals	6–3, 4–6, 6–4	No. 5
32.	(United States) Serena Williams	No. 8	Wimbledon, United Kingdom	Grass	Semifinals	6–2, 7–6^{(7–3)}	No. 5
33.	(United States) Lindsay Davenport	No. 2	Wimbledon, United Kingdom	Grass	Final	6–3, 7–6^{(7–3)}	No. 5
34.	(United States) Lindsay Davenport	No. 2	Stanford, United States	Hard	Final	6–1, 6–4	No. 3
35.	(Spain) Conchita Martínez	No. 6	San Diego, United States	Hard	Quarterfinals	6–3, 6–0	No. 3
36.	(United States) Monica Seles	No. 5	San Diego, United States	Hard	Final	6–0, 6–7^{(3–7)}, 6–3	No. 3
37.	(United States) Monica Seles	No. 6	New Haven, United States	Hard	Final	6–2, 6–4	No. 3
38.	(France) Nathalie Tauziat	No. 8	US Open, United States	Hard	Quarterfinals	6–4, 1–6, 6–1	No. 3
39.	(Switzerland) Martina Hingis	No. 1	US Open, United States	Hard	Semifinals	4–6, 6–3, 7–5	No. 3
40.	(United States) Lindsay Davenport	No. 2	US Open, United States	Hard	Final	6–4, 7–5	No. 3
41.	(Spain) Arantxa Sánchez Vicario	No. 9	Summer Olympics Sydney	Hard	Quarterfinals	3–6, 6–2, 6–4	No. 3
42.	(United States) Monica Seles	No. 5	Summer Olympics Sydney	Hard	Semifinals	6–1, 4–6, 6–3	No. 3
2001
43.	(Switzerland) Martina Hingis	No. 1	Miami, United States	Hard	Semifinals	6–3, 7–6^{(8–6)}	No. 3
44.	(United States) Jennifer Capriati	No. 5	Miami, United States	Hard	Final	4–6, 6–1, 7–6^{(7–4)}	No. 3
45.	(France) Nathalie Tauziat	No. 10	Wimbledon, United Kingdom	Grass	Quarterfinals	7–5, 6–1	No. 2
46.	(United States) Lindsay Davenport	No. 3	Wimbledon, United Kingdom	Grass	Semifinals	6–2, 6–7^{(1–7)}, 6–1	No. 2
47.	(Belgium) Justine Henin	No. 9	Wimbledon, United Kingdom	Grass	Final	6–1, 3–6, 6–0	No. 2
48.	(France) Nathalie Tauziat	No. 9	San Diego, United States	Hard	Quarterfinals	6–2, 6–2	No. 3
49.	(United States) Lindsay Davenport	No. 4	San Diego, United States	Hard	Semifinals	6–2, 7–5	No. 3
50.	(United States) Monica Seles	No. 10	San Diego, United States	Hard	Final	6–2, 6–3	No. 3
51.	(Belgium) Justine Henin	No. 6	New Haven, United States	Hard	Quarterfinals	6–3, 5–7, 6–2	No. 4
52.	(United States) Jennifer Capriati	No. 2	New Haven, United States	Hard	Semifinals	6–4, 7–6^{(7–1)}	No. 4
53.	(United States) Lindsay Davenport	No. 3	New Haven, United States	Hard	Final	7–6^{(8–6)}, 6–4	No. 4
54.	(Belgium) Kim Clijsters	No. 5	US Open, United States	Hard	Quarterfinals	6–3, 6–1	No. 4
55.	(United States) Jennifer Capriati	No. 2	US Open, United States	Hard	Semifinals	6–4, 6–2	No. 4
56.	(United States) Serena Williams	No. 10	US Open, United States	Hard	Final	6–2, 6–4	No. 4
2002
57.	(Belgium) Justine Henin	No. 7	Adelaide, Australia	Hard	Final	7–5, 6–2	No. 3
58.	(France) Amélie Mauresmo	No. 8	Paris, France	Hard (i)	Semifinals	4–6, 7–6^{(7–3)}, 7–5	No. 2
59.	(France) Amélie Mauresmo	No. 10	Antwerp, Belgium	Hard (i)	Semifinals	7–6^{(7–4)}, 6–0	No. 2
60.	(Belgium) Justine Henin	No. 9	Antwerp, Belgium	Hard (i)	Final	6–3, 5–7, 6–3	No. 2
61.	(Belgium) Justine Henin	No. 9	Amelia Island, United States	Clay	Final	2–6, 7–5, 7–6^{(7–5)}	No. 2
62.	(Switzerland) Martina Hingis	No. 4	Hamburg, Germany	Clay	Semifinals	7–5, 6–3	No. 1
63.	(United States) Monica Seles	No. 6	French Open, Paris, France	Clay	Quarterfinals	6–4, 6–3	No. 2
64.	(Belgium) Justine Henin	No. 6	Wimbledon, United Kingdom	Grass	Semifinals	6–3, 6–2	No. 1
65.	(Belgium) Kim Clijsters	No. 5	Stanford, United States	Hard	Final	6–3, 6–3	No. 2
66.	(Belgium) Kim Clijsters	No. 7	San Diego, United States	Hard	Quarterfinals	6–3, 5–7, 6–4	No. 2
67.	(United States) Lindsay Davenport	No. 9	San Diego, United States	Hard	Semifinals	6–2, 6–1	No. 2
68.	(Federal Republic of Yugoslavia) Jelena Dokic	No. 5	San Diego, United States	Hard	Final	6–2, 6–2	No. 2
69.	(United States) Lindsay Davenport	No. 10	New Haven, United States	Hard	Final	7–5, 6–0	No. 2
70.	(United States) Monica Seles	No. 5	US Open, United States	Hard	Quarterfinals	6–2, 6–3	No. 2
71.	(France) Amélie Mauresmo	No. 9	US Open, United States	Hard	Semifinals	6–3, 5–7, 6–4	No. 2
72.	(United States) Monica Seles	No. 7	WTA Tour Championships, Los Angeles, U.S.	Hard (i)	Semifinals	7–5, 6–4	No. 2
2003
73.	(Slovakia) Daniela Hantuchová	No. 8	Australian Open, Melbourne	Hard	Quarterfinals	6–4, 6–3	No. 2
74.	(Belgium) Justine Henin	No. 5	Australian Open, Melbourne	Hard	Semifinals	6–3, 6–3	No. 2
75.	(Slovakia) Daniela Hantuchová	No. 5	Antwerp, Belgium	Hard (i)	Semifinals	6–1, 6–4	No. 2
76.	(Belgium) Kim Clijsters	No. 3	Antwerp, Belgium	Hard (i)	Final	6–2, 6–4	No. 2
77.	(United States) Lindsay Davenport	No. 5	Wimbledon, United Kingdom	Grass	Quarterfinals	6–2, 2–6, 6–1	No. 4
78.	(Belgium) Kim Clijsters	No. 2	Wimbledon, United Kingdom	Grass	Semifinals	4–6, 6–3, 6–1	No. 4
2005
79.	(Russia) Anastasia Myskina	No. 6	Antwerp, Belgium	Hard (i)	Semifinals	6–3, 3–6, 6–3	No. 8
80.	(United States) Serena Williams	No. 4	Miami, United States	Hard	Quarterfinals	6–1, 7–6^{(10–8)}	No. 9
81.	(Russia) Maria Sharapova	No. 2	Wimbledon, United Kingdom	Grass	Semifinals	7–6^{(7–2)}, 6–1	No. 16
82.	(United States) Lindsay Davenport	No. 1	Wimbledon, United Kingdom	Grass	Final	4–6, 7–6^{(7–4)}, 9–7	No. 16
83.	(Russia) Elena Dementieva	No. 5	Fed Cup, Moscow, Russia	Clay(i)	Semifinals	6–1, 6–2	No. 8
84.	(United States) Serena Williams	No. 8	US Open, United States	Hard	Quarterfinals	7–6^{(7–5)}, 6–2	No. 10
2006
85.	(Switzerland) Patty Schnyder	No. 9	Rome, Italy	Clay	3rd round	7–6^{(7–2)}, 3–6, 6–1	No. 12
86.	(Switzerland) Patty Schnyder	No. 9	French Open, France	Clay	4th round	4–6, 6–3, 6–2	No. 13
2007
87.	(Russia) Maria Sharapova	No. 2	Wimbledon, United Kingdom	Grass	4th round	6–1, 6–3	No. 31
88.	(Russia) Svetlana Kuznetsova	No. 5	Wimbledon, United Kingdom	Grass	Quarterfinals	6–3, 6–4	No. 31
89.	(Serbia) Ana Ivanovic	No. 6	Wimbledon, United Kingdom	Grass	Semifinals	6–2, 6–4	No. 31
90.	(Russia) Nadia Petrova	No. 9	Fed Cup, Stowe, United States	Hard	Semifinals	7–6^{(8–6)}, 0–6, 6–4	No. 17
91.	(Russia) Anna Chakvetadze	No. 8	Fed Cup, Stowe, United States	Hard	Semifinals	6–1, 6–4	No. 17
92.	(Slovakia) Daniela Hantuchová	No. 10	San Diego, United States	Hard	3rd round	6–0, 6–3	No. 16
93.	(Serbia) Ana Ivanovic	No. 5	US Open, United States	Hard	4th round	6–4, 6–2	No. 14
94.	(Serbia) Jelena Janković	No. 3	US Open, United States	Hard	Quarterfinals	4–6, 6–1, 7–6^{(7–4)}	No. 14
2008
95.	(Russia) Elena Dementieva	No. 5	Wimbledon, United Kingdom	Grass	Semifinals	6–1, 7–6^{(7–3)}	No. 7
96.	(United States) Serena Williams	No. 6	Wimbledon, United Kingdom	Grass	Final	7–5, 6–4	No. 7
97.	(Russia) Dinara Safina	No. 3	Stuttgart, Germany	Hard (i)	Quarterfinals	6–4, 6–2	No. 8
98.	(Serbia) Ana Ivanovic	No. 4	Zurich, Switzerland	Hard (i)	Semifinals	4–6, 6–3, 6–4	No. 9
99.	(Russia) Elena Dementieva	No. 5	WTA Tour Championships, Doha, Qatar	Hard (i)	Round Robin	6–4, 4–6, 6–3	No. 8
100.	(United States) Serena Williams	No. 3	WTA Tour Championships, Doha, Qatar	Hard (i)	Round Robin	5–7, 6–1, 6–0	No. 8
101.	(Russia) Dinara Safina	No. 2	WTA Tour Championships, Doha, Qatar	Hard (i)	Round Robin	7–5, 6–3	No. 8
102.	(Serbia) Jelena Janković	No. 1	WTA Tour Championships, Doha, Qatar	Hard (i)	Semifinals	6–2, 2–6, 6–3	No. 8
103.	(Russia) Vera Zvonareva	No. 9	WTA Tour Championships, Doha, Qatar	Hard (i)	Final	6–7^{(5–7)}, 6–0, 6–2	No. 8
2009
104.	(Russia) Elena Dementieva	No. 4	Dubai, United Arab Emirates	Hard	Quarterfinals	6–3, 6–3	No. 6
105.	(United States) Serena Williams	No. 1	Dubai, United Arab Emirates	Hard	Semifinals	6–1, 2–6, 7–6^{(7–3)}	No. 6
106.	(Russia) Dinara Safina	No. 1	Wimbledon, United Kingdom	Grass	Semifinals	6–1, 6–0	No. 3
107.	(Russia) Elena Dementieva	No. 4	Stanford, United States	Hard	Semifinals	6–0, 6–1	No. 3
108.	(Russia) Svetlana Kuznetsova	No. 3	WTA Tour Championships, Doha, Qatar	Hard (i)	Round Robin	6–2, 6–7^{(3–7)}, 6–4	No. 8
109.	(Serbia) Jelena Janković	No. 8	WTA Tour Championships, Doha, Qatar	Hard (i)	Semifinals	5–7, 6–3, 6–4	No. 8
2010
110.	(Belarus) Victoria Azarenka	No. 6	Dubai, United Arab Emirates	Hard	Final	6–3, 7–5	No. 5
111.	(Poland) Agnieszka Radwańska	No. 9	Miami, United States	Hard	Quarterfinals	6–3, 6–1	No. 5
112.	(Australia) Samantha Stosur	No. 8	Madrid, Spain	Clay	Quarterfinals	6–3, 6–3	No. 3
113.	(Italy) Francesca Schiavone	No. 7	US Open, United States	Hard	Quarterfinals	7–6^{(7–5)}, 6–4	No. 4
2012
114.	(Czech Republic) Petra Kvitová	No. 3	Miami, United States	Hard	2nd round	6–4, 4–6, 6–0	No. 134
115.	(Australia) Samantha Stosur	No. 5	Rome, Italy	Clay	3rd round	6–4, 6–3	No. 63
116.	(Italy) Sara Errani	No. 9	London Summer Olympics	Grass	1st round	6–3, 6–1	No. 69
117.	(Italy) Sara Errani	No. 10	Cincinnati, United States	Hard	3rd round	6–3, 6–0	No. 64
118.	(Australia) Samantha Stosur	No. 6	Cincinnati, United States	Hard	Quarterfinals	6–2, 6–7^{(2–7)}, 6–4	No. 64
2013
119.	(Belarus) Victoria Azarenka	No. 2	Tokyo, Japan	Hard	2nd round	6–2, 6–4	No. 63
2014
120.	(Belarus) Victoria Azarenka	No. 10	Stanford, United States	Hard	2nd round	6–4, 7–6^{(7–1)}	No. 25
121.	(Germany) Angelique Kerber	No. 7	Montreal, Canada	Hard	3rd round	6–3, 3–6, 6–4	No. 26
122.	(United States) Serena Williams	No. 1	Montreal, Canada	Hard	Semifinals	6–7^{(2–7)}, 6–2, 6–3	No. 26
2015
123.	(Denmark) Caroline Wozniacki	No. 8	Auckland, New Zealand	Hard	Final	2–6, 6–3, 6–3	No. 19
124.	(Poland) Agnieszka Radwańska	No. 6	Australian Open, Melbourne	Hard	4th round	6–3, 2–6, 6–1	No. 18
125.	(Poland) Agnieszka Radwańska	No. 8	Doha, Qatar	Hard	Quarterfinals	6–4, 1–6, 6–3	No. 17
126.	(Denmark) Caroline Wozniacki	No. 5	Miami, United States	Hard	4th round	6–3, 7–6^{(7–1)}	No. 16
127.	(Poland) Agnieszka Radwańska	No. 7	Wuhan, China	Hard	1st round	6–1, 7–6^{(7–4)}	No. 24
128.	(Spain) Carla Suárez Navarro	No. 10	Wuhan, China	Hard	3rd round	6–3, 6–4	No. 24
129.	(Spain) Garbiñe Muguruza	No. 8	Wuhan, China	Hard	Final	6–3, 3–0 ret.	No. 24
2017
130.	(Russia) Svetlana Kuznetsova	No. 7	Miami, United States	Hard	4th round	6–3, 7–6^{(7–4)}	No. 12
131.	(Germany) Angelique Kerber	No. 1	Miami, United States	Hard	Quarterfinals	7–5, 6–3	No. 12
132.	(United Kingdom) Johanna Konta	No. 6	Rome, Italy	Clay	3rd round	6–1, 3–6, 6–1	No. 12
133.	(United Kingdom) Johanna Konta	No. 7	Wimbledon, United Kingdom	Grass	Semifinals	6–4, 6–2	No. 11
134.	(Latvia) Jeļena Ostapenko	No. 7	WTA Finals, Kallang, Singapore	Hard (i)	Round Robin	7–5, 6–7^{(3–7)}, 7–5	No. 5
135.	(Spain) Garbiñe Muguruza	No. 2	WTA Finals, Kallang, Singapore	Hard (i)	Round Robin	7–5, 6–4	No. 5
136.	(France) Caroline Garcia	No. 8	WTA Finals, Kallang, Singapore	Hard (i)	Semifinals	6–7^{(3–7)}, 6–2, 6–3	No. 5
2019
137.	(Czech Republic) Petra Kvitová	No. 3	Indian Wells, United States	Hard	2nd round	4–6, 7–5, 6–4	No. 36
138.	(Netherlands) Kiki Bertens	No. 5	Cincinnati, United States	Hard	2nd round	6–3, 3–6, 7–6^{(7–4)}	No. 65

== WTA Tour career earnings ==
Year	Majors (singles)	WTA titles	Total titles	Earnings ($)	Money list rank
1994–96	0	0	0	31,785	n/a
1997	0	0	0	466,863	14
1998	0	3	3	1,767,924	4
1999	0	6	6	2,316,005	4
2000	2	4	6	2,074,150	3
2001	2	4	6	2,662,610	1
2002	0	7	7	2,583,571	2
2003	0	1	1	1,126,555	8
2004	0	2	2	1,474,128	9
2005	1	1	2	1,509,065	8
2006	0	0	0	282,938	45
2007	1	2	3	1,878,187	5
2008	1	2	3	3,766,315	2
2009	0	2	2	3,126,894	4
2010	0	2	2	2,614,782	5
2011	0	0	0	208,659	98
2012	0	1	1	607,316	27
2013	0	0	0	463,488	53
2014	0	1	1	1,242,361	21
2015	0	3	3	2,404,419	9
2016	0	1	1	1,823,733	16
2017	0	0	0	5,468,741	1
2018	0	0	0	1,030,559	37
2019	0	0	0	805,490	50
2020	0	0	0	221,746	113
2021	0	0	0	322,257	118
2022	0	0	0	122,563
2023	0	0	0	192,294	196
2024	0	0	0	53,300	353
2025	0	0	0	218,786	202
2026	0	0	0	494,211	140
Career*	7	42	49	43,361,575	4

*As of November 20, 2026

== Longest winning streaks ==
=== 35 match win streak (2000) ===
#	Tournament	Start date	Category	Surface	Rd	Opponent	Rank	Score
–	French Open	29 May	Grand Slam	Clay	QF	(Spain) Arantxa Sánchez Vicario (8)	#9	0–6, 6–1, 2–6
1	Wimbledon Championships	26 June	Grand Slam	Grass	1R	(Czech Republic) Květa Hrdličková	#41	6–3, 6–1
2	Wimbledon Championships	26 June	Grand Slam	Grass	2R	(Japan) Ai Sugiyama	#20	6–1, 6–4
3	Wimbledon Championships	26 June	Grand Slam	Grass	3R	(France) Nathalie Dechy	#24	6–0, 7–6^{(7–4)}
4	Wimbledon Championships	26 June	Grand Slam	Grass	4R	(Belgium) Sabine Appelmans	#27	6–4, 6–4
5	Wimbledon Championships	26 June	Grand Slam	Grass	QF	(Switzerland) Martina Hingis (1)	#1	6–3, 4–6, 6–4
6	Wimbledon Championships	26 June	Grand Slam	Grass	SF	(United States) Serena Williams (8)	#8	6–2, 7–6^{(7–3)}
7	Wimbledon Championships	26 June	Grand Slam	Grass	F	(United States) Lindsay Davenport (2)	#2	6–3, 7–6^{(7–3)}
8	Bank of the West Classic	24 July	Tier II	Hard	2R	(Russia) Tatiana Panova	#49	6–2, 6–2
9	Bank of the West Classic	24 July	Tier II	Hard	QF	(United States) Amy Frazier (10)	#21	6–7^{(5–7)}, 6–4, 7–6^{(7–5)}
10	Bank of the West Classic	24 July	Tier II	Hard	SF	(Russia) Anna Kournikova (9)	#19	6–4, 7–5
11	Bank of the West Classic	24 July	Tier II	Hard	F	(United States) Lindsay Davenport (1)	#2	6–1, 6–4
12	Acura Classic	31 July	Tier II	Hard	2R	(South Africa) Amanda Coetzer	#13	6–0, 6–4
13	Acura Classic	31 July	Tier II	Hard	QF	(Spain) Conchita Martínez (5)	#6	6–3, 6–0
14	Acura Classic	31 July	Tier II	Hard	SF	(United States) Amy Frazier	#26	6–2, 6–3
15	Acura Classic	31 July	Tier II	Hard	F	(United States) Monica Seles (4)	#5	6–0, 6–7^{(3–7)}, 6–3
16	Pilot Pen Tennis	21 August	Tier II	Hard	2R	(Russia) Elena Likhovtseva	#23	6–3, 7–5
17	Pilot Pen Tennis	21 August	Tier II	Hard	QF	(Switzerland) Patty Schnyder	#28	6–4, 6–2
18	Pilot Pen Tennis	21 August	Tier II	Hard	SF	(South Africa) Amanda Coetzer (5)	#14	6–3, 7–5
19	Pilot Pen Tennis	21 August	Tier II	Hard	F	(United States) Monica Seles (2)	#6	6–2, 6–4
20	US Open	28 August	Grand Slam	Hard	1R	(France) Anne-Gaëlle Sidot	#31	6–3, 6–4
21	US Open	28 August	Grand Slam	Hard	2R	(Czech Republic) Květa Hrdličková	#40	6–1, 6–1
22	US Open	28 August	Grand Slam	Hard	3R	(United States) Meghann Shaughnessy	#48	7–6^{(7–3)}, 6–1
23	US Open	28 August	Grand Slam	Hard	4R	(Spain) Magüi Serna	#33	6–2, 6–2
24	US Open	28 August	Grand Slam	Hard	QF	(France) Nathalie Tauziat (8)	#8	6–4, 1–6, 6–1
25	US Open	28 August	Grand Slam	Hard	SF	(Switzerland) Martina Hingis (1)	#1	4–6, 6–3, 7–5
26	US Open	28 August	Grand Slam	Hard	F	(United States) Lindsay Davenport (2)	#2	6–4, 7–5
27	Sydney Olympics	18 September	Olympics	Hard	1R	(Slovakia) Henrieta Nagyová	N/A	6–2, 6–2
28	Sydney Olympics	18 September	Olympics	Hard	2R	(Thailand) Tamarine Tanasugarn	N/A	6–2, 6–3
29	Sydney Olympics	18 September	Olympics	Hard	3R	(Germany) Jana Kandarr	N/A	6–2, 6–2
30	Sydney Olympics	18 September	Olympics	Hard	QF	(Spain) Arantxa Sánchez Vicario (5)	#9	3–6, 6–2, 6–4
31	Sydney Olympics	18 September	Olympics	Hard	SF	(United States) Monica Seles (3)	#5	6–1, 4–6, 6–3
32	Sydney Olympics	18 September	Olympics	Hard	G	(Russia) Elena Dementieva (10)	N/A	6–2, 6–4
33	Generali Ladies Linz	16 October	Tier II	Hard (i)	2R	(Japan) Ai Sugiyama	#32	7–5, 6–2
34	Generali Ladies Linz	16 October	Tier II	Hard (i)	QF	(Russia) Elena Likhovtseva	#30	6–3, 6–2
35	Generali Ladies Linz	16 October	Tier II	Hard (i)	SF	(United States) Chanda Rubin (5)	#15	6–4, 6–0
–	Generali Ladies Linz	16 October	Tier II	Hard (i)	F	(United States) Lindsay Davenport (1)	#2	4–6, 6–3, 2–6

== Double bagel matches (6–0, 6–0) ==
Outcome	Year	No.	Tournament	Surface	Opponent	Rank	Round
Win	1997	1.	Aegon International, Eastbourne	Grass	(Germany) Wiltrud Probst	89	Q-R32
Win	1997	2.	Southern California Open, San Diego	Hard	(Canada) Martina Nejedly	234	Q-R32
Win	2002	3.	US Open, New York	Hard	(Croatia) Mirjana Lučić	214	R128 (1st round)
Win	2004	4.	Olympic Games, Athens, Greece	Hard	(Slovenia) Maja Matevžič	263	R32 (2nd round)
Win	2005	5.	İstanbul Cup, Turkey	Clay	(Spain) Marta Marrero	117	R16 (2nd round)
Win	2015	6.	Wimbledon, London	Grass	(United States) Madison Brengle	36	R128 (1st round)

== Career Grand Slam tournament seedings ==
Boldface indicates tournaments won by Williams, while italics indicates Williams was the runner-up.

Year	Australian Open	French Open	Wimbledon	US Open
1997	did not play	unseeded	unseeded	unseeded
1998	unseeded	8th	7th	5th
1999	5th	5th	6th	3rd
2000	did not play	4th	**5th**	**3rd**
2001	3rd	2nd	**2nd**	**4th**
2002	2nd	2nd	1st	2nd
2003	2nd	3rd	4th	did not play
2004	3rd	4th	3rd	11th
2005	8th	11th	**14th**	10th
2006	10th	11th	6th	did not play
2007	did not play	26th	**23rd**	12th
2008	8th	8th	**7th**	7th
2009	6th	3rd	3rd	3rd
2010	6th	2nd	2nd	3rd
2011	4th	did not play	23rd	unseeded
2012	did not play	unseeded	unseeded	unseeded
2013	25th	30th	did not play	unseeded
2014	unseeded	29th	30th	19th
2015	18th	15th	16th	23rd
2016	8th	9th	8th	6th
2017	13th	10th	10th	9th
2018	5th	9th	9th	16th
2019	unseeded	unseeded	unseeded	unseeded
2020	unseeded	unseeded	not held	unseeded
2021	unseeded	unseeded	unseeded	did not play
2022	did not play	did not play	did not play	unseeded
2023	did not play	did not play	unseeded	unseeded
2024	did not play	did not play	did not play	did not play
2025	did not play	did not play	did not play	unseeded
2026	unseeded			

Legend
did not play	unseeded	seeded 17–32	seeded 9–16
seeded 5–8	seeded 3–4	seeded No. 2	seeded No. 1
