= 2016 Fed Cup World Group play-offs =

Part of tennis tournament

The World Group play-offs were four ties which involves the losing nations of the World Group first round and the winning nations of the World Group II. Nations that win their play-off ties entered the 2017 World Group, while losing nations joined the 2017 World Group II.

Participating Teams
Australia	Belarus	Germany	Italy
Romania	Russia	Spain	United States

== Russia vs. Belarus ==
Russia
2
Luzhniki Small Sports Arena, Moscow, Russia
16–17 April 2016
Clay (i)

Belarus
3

			1	2	3
1	(Russia) (Belarus)	Daria Kasatkina; Aliaksandra Sasnovich	6; 3	3; 6	6; 1
2	(Russia) (Belarus)	Margarita Gasparyan; Victoria Azarenka	2; 6	3; 6
3	(Russia) (Belarus)	Daria Kasatkina; Victoria Azarenka	2; 6	7; 5	3; 6
4	(Russia) (Belarus)	Margarita Gasparyan; Aliaksandra Sasnovich	6; 4	1; 6	5; 7
5	(Russia) (Belarus)	Daria Kasatkina / Elena Vesnina; Olga Govortsova / Aryna Sabalenka	6; 4	6; 2

== Spain vs. Italy ==
Spain
4
Club de Tennis Lleida, Lleida, Spain
16–17 April 2016
Clay

Italy
0

			1	2	3
1	(Spain) (Italy)	Garbiñe Muguruza; Francesca Schiavone	7^{7} 6^{4}	6; 0
2	(Spain) (Italy)	Carla Suárez Navarro; Roberta Vinci	6; 1	6; 1
3	(Spain) (Italy)	Garbiñe Muguruza; Roberta Vinci	6; 2	6; 2
4	(Spain) (Italy)	Carla Suárez Navarro; Francesca Schiavone				not played
5	(Spain) (Italy)	Anabel Medina Garrigues / Sara Sorribes Tormo; Karin Knapp / Francesca Schiavone	1; 1			retired

== Romania vs. Germany ==
Romania
1
Polyvalent Hall (Cluj-Napoca), Cluj-Napoca, Romania
16–17 April 2016
Clay (i)

Germany
4

			1	2	3
1	(Romania) (Germany)	Irina-Camelia Begu; Angelique Kerber	2; 6	3; 6
2	(Romania) (Germany)	Simona Halep; Andrea Petkovic	6; 4	6^{5} 7^{7}	6; 4
3	(Romania) (Germany)	Simona Halep; Angelique Kerber	2; 6	2; 6
4	(Romania) (Germany)	Monica Niculescu; Andrea Petkovic	6; 0	6^{1} 7^{7}	3; 6
5	(Romania) (Germany)	Irina-Camelia Begu / Alexandra Dulgheru; Annika Beck / Julia Görges	7^{7} 6^{5}	6^{4} 7^{7}	[7] [10]

== Australia vs. United States ==
Australia
0
Pat Rafter Arena, Brisbane, Australia
16–17 April 2016
Clay

United States
4

			1	2	3
1	(Australia) (United States)	Daria Gavrilova; Madison Keys	4; 6	2; 6
2	(Australia) (United States)	Samantha Stosur; Christina McHale	6; 3	1; 6	5; 7
3	(Australia) (United States)	Samantha Stosur; Coco Vandeweghe	6; 2	5; 7	4; 6
4	(Australia) (United States)	Daria Gavrilova; Christina McHale				not played
5	(Australia) (United States)	Daria Gavrilova / Arina Rodionova; Bethanie Mattek-Sands / Coco Vandeweghe	1; 6	4; 6
