= 1999 Fed Cup World Group =

Part of tennis tournament

- Date: 17 April – 19 September
- Edition: 9th

Champions
- United States
← 1998 ·	Fed Cup	· 2000 →

The World Group was the highest level of Fed Cup competition in 1999. Eight nations competed in a three-round knockout competition. Spain was the defending champion, but they were defeated in the first round by Italy. United States defeated Italy, and then Russia in the final to claim their 16th title.

== Participating teams ==
Participating teams
Croatia	France	Italy	Russia
Slovakia	Spain	Switzerland	United States

== Draw ==
First round 17–18 April
Reggio Calabria, Italy (Indoor carpet)
1	Spain	2
Italy	3
Raleigh, NC, United States (Outdoor clay)
Croatia	0
4	United States	5
Moscow, Russia (Indoor carpet)
3	France	2
Russia	3
Zürich, Switzerland (Indoor carpet)
Slovakia	5
2	Switzerland	0

Semifinals; 24–25 July
Ancona, Italy (Outdoor clay)
Italy	1
4	United States	4
Moscow, Russia (Indoor clay)
Russia	3
Slovakia	2

Final; 18–19 September
Stanford, CA, United States (Outdoor hard)
4	United States	4
Russia	1

== First round ==
=== Spain vs. Italy ===
Spain
2
Palapentimele, Reggio Calabria, Italy
17–18 April 1999
Carpet (indoors)

Italy
3

			1	2	3
1	(Spain) (Italy)	Magüi Serna; Rita Grande	6; 2	6; 4
2	(Spain) (Italy)	Virginia Ruano Pascual; Silvia Farina	7; 5	3; 6	0; 6
3	(Spain) (Italy)	Magüi Serna; Silvia Farina	6; 3	6^{4} 7^{7}	4; 6
4	(Spain) (Italy)	Virginia Ruano Pascual; Rita Grande	4; 6	1; 6
5	(Spain) (Italy)	Gala León García / María Sánchez Lorenzo; Tathiana Garbin / Adriana Serra Zanetti	7; 5	6; 0

=== Croatia vs. United States ===
Croatia
0
Raleigh Racquet Club, Raleigh, NC, United States
17–18 April 1999
Har-Tru clay (outdoors)

United States
5

			1	2	3
1	(Croatia) (United States)	Iva Majoli; Chanda Rubin	6^{5} 7^{7}	6; 4	8; 10
2	(Croatia) (United States)	Silvija Talaja; Monica Seles	3; 6	1; 6
3	(Croatia) (United States)	Iva Majoli; Monica Seles	0; 6	3; 6
4	(Croatia) (United States)	Silvija Talaja; Chanda Rubin	3; 6	4; 6
5	(Croatia) (United States)	Iva Majoli / Silvija Talaja; Chanda Rubin / Monica Seles	3; 6	2; 6

=== France vs. Russia ===
France
2
Olympic Stadium, Moscow, Russia
17–18 April 1999
Supreme carpet (indoors)

Russia
3

			1	2	3
1	(France) (Russia)	Amélie Mauresmo; Elena Likhovtseva	6; 2	6; 2
2	(France) (Russia)	Nathalie Tauziat; Tatiana Panova	4; 6	2; 6
3	(France) (Russia)	Nathalie Tauziat; Elena Likhovtseva	2; 6	4; 6
4	(France) (Russia)	Amélie Mauresmo; Tatiana Panova	6; 2	5; 7	6; 1
5	(France) (Russia)	Amélie Mauresmo / Nathalie Tauziat; Elena Likhovtseva / Elena Makarova	0; 6	6^{5} 7^{7}

=== Slovakia vs. Switzerland ===
Slovakia
5
Saal Sports Hall, Zürich, Switzerland
17–18 April 1999
Greenset Trophy carpet (indoors)

Switzerland
0

			1	2	3
1	(Slovakia) (Switzerland)	Karina Habšudová; Emmanuelle Gagliardi	7^{10} 6^{8}	6; 0
2	(Slovakia) (Switzerland)	Henrieta Nagyová; Caecilia Charbonnier	6; 2	5; 7	6; 2
3	(Slovakia) (Switzerland)	Henrieta Nagyová; Emmanuelle Gagliardi	3; 6	6; 1	6; 3
4	(Slovakia) (Switzerland)	Karina Habšudová; Caecilia Charbonnier	6; 4	6; 4
5	(Slovakia) (Switzerland)	Karina Habšudová / Henrieta Nagyová; Laura Bao / Caecilia Charbonnier	6; 2	7^{9} 6^{7}

== Semifinals ==
=== Italy vs. United States ===
Italy
1
Ancona Tennis Association, Ancona, Italy
24–25 July 1999
Red clay (outdoors)

United States
4

			1	2	3
1	(Italy) (United States)	Rita Grande; Venus Williams	2; 6	3; 6
2	(Italy) (United States)	Silvia Farina; Monica Seles	6; 4	4; 6	6; 4
3	(Italy) (United States)	Silvia Farina; Venus Williams	1; 6	1; 6
4	(Italy) (United States)	Rita Grande; Serena Williams	1; 6	1; 6
5	(Italy) (United States)	Tathiana Garbin / Adriana Serra Zanetti; Serena Williams / Venus Williams	2; 6	2; 6

=== Russia vs. Slovakia ===
Russia
3
Olympic Stadium, Moscow, Russia
24–25 July 1999
Red clay (indoors)

Slovakia
2

			1	2	3
1	(Russia) (Slovakia)	Elena Likhovtseva; Ľudmila Cervanová	7; 5	6^{5} 7^{7}	6; 3
2	(Russia) (Slovakia)	Tatiana Panova; Karina Habšudová	6^{5} 7^{7}	1; 6
3	(Russia) (Slovakia)	Elena Likhovtseva; Karina Habšudová	3; 6	6; 4	6; 2
4	(Russia) (Slovakia)	Tatiana Panova; Ľudmila Cervanová	6; 4	6; 4
5	(Russia) (Slovakia)	Elena Dementieva / Elena Makarova; Ľudmila Cervanová / Daniela Hantuchová	5; 7	6^{5} 7^{7}

== Final ==
=== United States vs. Russia ===
United States
4
Taube Tennis Stadium, Stanford, CA, United States
18–19 September 1999
Plexipave (outdoors)

Russia
1

			1	2	3
1	(United States) (Russia)	Venus Williams; Elena Likhovtseva	6; 3	6; 4
2	(United States) (Russia)	Lindsay Davenport; Elena Dementieva	6; 4	6; 0
3	(United States) (Russia)	Lindsay Davenport; Elena Likhovtseva	6; 4	6; 4
4	(United States) (Russia)	Venus Williams; Elena Dementieva	6; 1	3; 6	6^{5} 7^{7}
5	(United States) (Russia)	Serena Williams / Venus Williams; Elena Dementieva / Elena Makarova	6; 2	6; 1

1999 Fed Cup Champions
(United States)
United States
Sixteenth title

== See also ==
- Fed Cup structure
