= 2016 Fed Cup World Group =

Part of tennis tournament

- Date: 6 February – 13 November
- Edition: 26th

Champions
- Czech Republic
- Fed Cup

The World Group was the highest level of Fed Cup competition in 2016.

Participating Teams
Czech Republic	France	Germany	Italy
Netherlands	Romania	Russia	Switzerland

== Draw ==
Quarterfinals; 6–7 February
Cluj-Napoca, Romania
1	Czech Republic	3
Romania	2
Leipzig, Germany
Switzerland	3
3	Germany	2
Marseille, France
4	Italy	1
France	4
Moscow, Russia
Netherlands	3
2	Russia	1

Semifinals; 16–17 April
Lucerne, Switzerland
1	Czech Republic	3
Switzerland	2
Trélazé, France
France	3
Netherlands	2

Final; 12–13 November
Strasbourg, France
1	Czech Republic	3
France	2

== First round ==
=== Romania vs Czech Republic ===
Romania
2
Sala Polivalentă, Cluj-Napoca, Romania
6–7 February 2016
Hard (indoors)

Czech Republic
3

			1	2	3
1	(Romania) (Czech Republic)	Simona Halep; Karolína Plíšková	7^{7} 6^{4}	4; 6	2; 6
2	(Romania) (Czech Republic)	Monica Niculescu; Petra Kvitová	6; 3	6; 4
3	(Romania) (Czech Republic)	Simona Halep; Petra Kvitová	6; 4	3; 6	6; 3
4	(Romania) (Czech Republic)	Monica Niculescu; Karolína Plíšková	4; 6	6; 4	3; 6
5	(Romania) (Czech Republic)	Andreea Mitu / Raluca Olaru; Karolína Plíšková / Barbora Strýcová	2; 6	3; 6

=== Germany vs. Switzerland ===
Germany
2
Leipzig Trade Fair, Leipzig, Germany
6–7 February 2016
Hard (indoors)

Switzerland
3

			1	2	3
1	(Germany) (Switzerland)	Andrea Petkovic; Belinda Bencic	3; 6	4; 6
2	(Germany) (Switzerland)	Angelique Kerber; Timea Bacsinszky	6; 1	6; 3
3	(Germany) (Switzerland)	Angelique Kerber; Belinda Bencic	6^{4} 7^{7}	3; 6
4	(Germany) (Switzerland)	Annika Beck; Timea Bacsinszky	7; 5	6; 4
5	(Germany) (Switzerland)	Andrea Petkovic / Anna-Lena Grönefeld; Belinda Bencic / Martina Hingis	3; 6	2; 6

=== France vs. Italy ===
France
4
Palais des sports, Marseille, France
6–7 February 2016
Hard (indoors)

Italy
1

			1	2	3
1	(France) (Italy)	Kristina Mladenovic; Camila Giorgi	6; 1	4; 6	1; 6
2	(France) (Italy)	Caroline Garcia; Sara Errani	6; 3	7; 5
3	(France) (Italy)	Kristina Mladenovic; Sara Errani	7^{7} 6^{4}	6; 1
4	(France) (Italy)	Caroline Garcia; Camila Giorgi	6; 3	6; 4
5	(France) (Italy)	Kristina Mladenovic / Caroline Garcia; Martina Caregaro / Sara Errani	6; 0	6; 1

=== Russia vs. Netherlands ===
Russia
1
Olympic Stadium, Moscow, Russia
6–7 February 2016
Hard (indoors)

Netherlands
3

			1	2	3
1	(Russia) (Netherlands)	Ekaterina Makarova; Kiki Bertens	3; 6	4; 6
2	(Russia) (Netherlands)	Svetlana Kuznetsova; Richèl Hogenkamp	6^{4} 7^{7}	7; 5	8; 10
3	(Russia) (Netherlands)	Svetlana Kuznetsova; Kiki Bertens	1; 6	4; 6
4	(Russia) (Netherlands)	Ekaterina Makarova; Richèl Hogenkamp				not played
5	(Russia) (Netherlands)	Daria Kasatkina / Ekaterina Makarova; Cindy Burger / Arantxa Rus	6; 0	6; 2

The match between Kuznetsova and Hogenkamp, which lasted for 4 hours, became the longest singles match in the history of the Fed Cup.

== Semifinals ==
=== Switzerland vs. Czech Republic ===
Switzerland
2
Messe Luzern, Lucerne, Switzerland
16–17 April 2016
Hard (indoors)

Czech Republic
3

			1	2	3
1	(Switzerland) (Czech Republic)	Timea Bacsinszky; Barbora Strýcová	0; 6	2; 6
2	(Switzerland) (Czech Republic)	Viktorija Golubic; Karolína Plíšková	3; 6	6; 4	6; 4
3	(Switzerland) (Czech Republic)	Timea Bacsinszky; Karolína Plíšková	4; 6	2; 6
4	(Switzerland) (Czech Republic)	Viktorija Golubic; Barbora Strýcová	3; 6	7^{8} 6^{6}	6; 1
5	(Switzerland) (Czech Republic)	Viktorija Golubic / Martina Hingis; Lucie Hradecká / Karolína Plíšková	2; 6	2; 6

=== France vs. Netherlands ===
France
3
Arena Loire, Trélazé, France
16–17 April 2016
Clay (indoors)

Netherlands
2

			1	2	3
1	(France) (Netherlands)	Caroline Garcia; Kiki Bertens	4; 6	2; 6
2	(France) (Netherlands)	Kristina Mladenovic; Richèl Hogenkamp	6; 2	6; 4
3	(France) (Netherlands)	Kristina Mladenovic; Kiki Bertens	5; 7	4; 6
4	(France) (Netherlands)	Caroline Garcia; Arantxa Rus	6; 3	6; 4
5	(France) (Netherlands)	Caroline Garcia / Kristina Mladenovic; Kiki Bertens / Richèl Hogenkamp	4; 6	6; 3	6; 3

== Final ==
=== France vs. Czech Republic ===
France
2
Rhénus Sport, Strasbourg, France
12–13 November 2016
Hard (indoors)

Czech Republic
3

			1	2	3
1	(France) (Czech Republic)	Kristina Mladenovic; Karolína Plíšková	3; 6	6; 4	14; 16
2	(France) (Czech Republic)	Caroline Garcia; Petra Kvitová	7^{8} 6^{6}	6; 3
3	(France) (Czech Republic)	Caroline Garcia; Karolína Plíšková	6; 3	3; 6	6; 3
4	(France) (Czech Republic)	Alizé Cornet; Barbora Strýcová	2; 6	6^{4} 7^{7}
5	(France) (Czech Republic)	Caroline Garcia / Kristina Mladenovic; Karolína Plíšková / Barbora Strýcová	5; 7	5; 7
