= 2005 Fed Cup World Group =

Part of tennis tournament

- Date: 23 April – 18 September
- Edition: 15th

Champions
- Russia
- Fed Cup

The World Group was the highest level of Fed Cup women's tennis competition in 2005. Eight nations competed in a three-round knockout competition. Russia was the defending champion, and they reached the final alongside, for a second consecutive time, France. Russia defeated France once again, giving them their second title.

== Participating teams ==
Participating teams
Argentina	Austria	Belgium	France
Italy	Russia	Spain	United States

== Draw ==
Quarterfinals; 23–24 April
Brindisi, Italy (Outdoor clay)
1	Russia	4
Italy	1
Delray Beach, Florida, United States (Outdoor hard)
Belgium	0
4	United States	5
Jerez, Spain (Outdoor clay)
3	Spain	3
Argentina	2
Pörtschach, Austria (Outdoor clay)
Austria	1
2	France	4

Semifinals; 9–10 July
Moscow, Russia (Indoor clay)
1	Russia	4
4	United States	1
Aix-en-Provence, France (Outdoor hard)
3	Spain	1
2	France	3

Final; 17–18 September
Paris, France (Outdoor clay)
1	Russia	3
2	France	2

== First round ==
=== Russia vs. Italy ===
Russia
4
Circolo Tennis Brindisi, Brindisi, Italy
23–24 April 2005
Clay (outdoors)

Italy
1

			1	2	3
1	(Russia) (Italy)	Dinara Safina; Francesca Schiavone	5; 7	3; 6
2	(Russia) (Italy)	Elena Dementieva; Tathiana Garbin	6; 4	6; 3
3	(Russia) (Italy)	Elena Dementieva; Francesca Schiavone	4; 6	7^{7} 6^{2}	6; 0
4	(Russia) (Italy)	Elena Bovina; Maria Elena Camerin	6; 3	3; 6	6; 2
5	(Russia) (Italy)	Vera Dushevina / Dinara Safina; Tathiana Garbin / Mara Santangelo	6; 3	7; 5

=== Belgium vs. United States ===
Belgium
0
Delray Beach Tennis Center, Delray Beach, Florida, United States
23–24 April 2005
Playpave (outdoors)

United States
5

			1	2	3
1	(Belgium) (United States)	Eveline Vanhyfte; Lindsay Davenport	0; 6	2; 6
2	(Belgium) (United States)	Els Callens; Venus Williams	2; 6	2; 6
3	(Belgium) (United States)	Els Callens; Lindsay Davenport	4; 6	0; 6
4	(Belgium) (United States)	Leslie Butkiewicz; Venus Williams	1; 6	4; 6
5	(Belgium) (United States)	Kirsten Flipkens / Eveline Vanhyfte; Lindsay Davenport / Corina Morariu	1; 6	2; 6

=== Spain vs. Argentina ===
Spain
3
Club Nazaret, Jerez de la Frontera, Spain
23–24 April 2005
Clay (outdoors)

Argentina
2

			1	2	3
1	(Spain) (Argentina)	Nuria Llagostera Vives; Gisela Dulko	6; 4	4; 6	6; 3
2	(Spain) (Argentina)	Anabel Medina Garrigues; María Emilia Salerni	6; 4	4; 6	6; 3
3	(Spain) (Argentina)	Marta Marrero; Gisela Dulko	0; 6	3; 6
4	(Spain) (Argentina)	Nuria Llagostera Vives; Mariana Díaz Oliva	6^{6} 7^{8}	4; 6
5	(Spain) (Argentina)	Nuria Llagostera Vives / Anabel Medina Garrigues; Gisela Dulko / María Emilia Salerni	7; 4	6; 4

=== Austria vs. France ===
Austria
1
Werzer Arena, Pörtschach, Austria
23–24 April 2005
Clay (outdoors)

France
4

			1	2	3
1	(Austria) (France)	Yvonne Meusburger; Nathalie Dechy	7^{7} 6^{3}	6; 2
2	(Austria) (France)	Tamira Paszek; Virginie Razzano	3; 6	3; 6
3	(Austria) (France)	Yvonne Meusburger; Virginie Razzano	3; 6	6^{2} 7^{7}
4	(Austria) (France)	Tamira Paszek; Nathalie Dechy	6^{5} 7^{7}	2; 6
5	(Austria) (France)	Daniela Klemenschits / Sandra Klemenschits; Nathalie Dechy / Virginie Razzano	4; 6	5; 7

== Semifinals ==
=== Russia vs. United States ===
Russia
4
Olympic Stadium, Moscow, Russia
9–10 July 2005
Clay (indoors)

United States
1

			1	2	3
1	(Russia) (United States)	Anastasia Myskina; Venus Williams	5; 7	6; 4	6; 2
2	(Russia) (United States)	Elena Dementieva; Mashona Washington	7; 5	6; 4
3	(Russia) (United States)	Elena Dementieva; Venus Williams	1; 6	2; 6
4	(Russia) (United States)	Anastasia Myskina; Jill Craybas	6; 2	6; 4
5	(Russia) (United States)	Vera Dushevina / Dinara Safina; Corina Morariu / Venus Williams	6; 1	7; 5

=== Spain vs. France ===
Spain
1
Ligue de Provence de Tennis, Aix en Provence, France
9–10 July 2005
Greenset hard (outdoors)

France
3

			1	2	3
1	(Spain) (France)	Anabel Medina Garrigues; Amélie Mauresmo	4; 6	3; 6
2	(Spain) (France)	Nuria Llagostera Vives; Mary Pierce	4; 6	4; 6
3	(Spain) (France)	Nuria Llagostera Vives; Amélie Mauresmo	3; 6	1; 6
4	(Spain) (France)	Arantxa Parra Santonja; Séverine Beltrame	6; 4	6; 4
5	(Spain) (France)	Anabel Medina Garrigues / María Sánchez Lorenzo; Amélie Mauresmo / Mary Pierce	2; 1			not completed

== Final ==
=== Russia vs. France ===
Russia
3
Court Philippe Chatrier, Paris, France
17–18 September 2005
Red clay (outdoors)

France
2

			1	2	3
1	(Russia) (France)	Elena Dementieva; Mary Pierce	7^{7} 6^{1}	2; 6	6; 1
2	(Russia) (France)	Anastasia Myskina; Amélie Mauresmo	4; 6	2; 6
3	(Russia) (France)	Elena Dementieva; Amélie Mauresmo	6; 4	4; 6	6; 2
4	(Russia) (France)	Anastasia Myskina; Mary Pierce	6; 4	4; 6	2; 6
5	(Russia) (France)	Elena Dementieva / Dinara Safina; Amélie Mauresmo / Mary Pierce	6; 4	1; 6	6; 3

2005 Fed Cup champions

Russia
Second title

== See also ==
- Fed Cup structure
