= Italy Billie Jean King Cup team =

Italian national women's tennis team

Italy
- Captain: Tathiana Garbin
- Nations Ranking: 1 (4 December 2024)
- Highest ranking: 1 (9 November 2009)
- Lowest ranking: 9 (11 July 2005)
- Colors: blue & white
- First year: 1963
- Years played: 54
- Ties played (W–L): 153 (89–64)
- Years in World Group: 49 (54–46)
- Titles: 6 (2006, 2009, 2010, 2013, 2024, 2025)
- Runners-up: 2 (2007, 2023)
- Most total wins: Francesca Schiavone (26–21)
- Most singles wins: Francesca Schiavone (22–20)
- Most doubles wins: Roberta Vinci (18–1)
- Best doubles team: Sara Errani / Roberta Vinci (6–1)
- Most ties played: Sara Errani (28)
- Most years played: Roberta Vinci (15)

The Italy women's national tennis team represents Italy in international women's tennis and is directed by the Federazione Italiana Tennis. The team played in the first ever tournament in 1963, and is one of four teams that has taken part in every single edition since..

The Italian national team was initially unsuccessful in world tennis, only winning twenty ties in the first two decades of competition, but in recent times they have become one of the most successful teams in the world. They have been a regular member of the ITF rankings World Top Ten since the initiation of the rankings in 2002, and became one of five teams to reach the World No. 1 position in 2009, after they managed to reach all but one final from 2006 to 2010. They have also reached every semifinal since 2009, and since 2001 have accumulated a 22–9 win–loss ratio. Francesca Schiavone holds the Italian Fed Cup record for most singles wins and total wins, while Roberta Vinci holds the record for most doubles wins and years of participation. Sandra Cecchini, however, holds the record for most appearances, having played in two more ties than Schiavone and Vinci. Former ATP World No. 7 and Davis Cup captain Corrado Barazzutti was the captain of the Italian Fed Cup team, having held that position from 2002 until 2016. In October 2016, Tathiana Garbin was appointed as the new captain.

On 20 November 2024 the Italian national team won their fifth Billie Jean King Cup. On 21 September 2025, Italy defended its title by beating the U.S. team in the final.

The team is currently the World No. 1 in the ITF rankings.

== Current team ==
| Name | DOB | First | Last | Ties | Win/Loss | | | Best Ranks | |
| Name | DOB | First | Last | Ties | Sin | Dou | Tot | Sin | Dou |
|---|---|---|---|---|---|---|---|---|---|
| Jasmine Paolini | 4 January 1996 (age 30) | 2017 | 2024 | 12 | 3–5 | 2–6 | 5–11 | 4 | 10 |
| Martina Trevisan | 3 November 1993 (age 32) | 2017 | 2024 | 10 | 2–3 | 4–2 | 6–5 | 24 | 138 |
| Elisabetta Cocciaretto | 25 January 2001 (age 25) | 2018 | 2024 | 7 | 5–2 | 1–1 | 6–3 | 64 | 244 |
| Lucia Bronzetti | 10 December 1998 (age 27) | 2022 | 2024 | 2 | 0–0 | 0–2 | 0–2 | 57 | 375 |
| Sara Errani | 29 April 1987 (age 39) | 2009 | 2024 | 28 | 16–16 | 12–5 | 28–21 | 5 | 1 |

== History ==
Italy competed in its first Fed Cup in 1963, the team consisting of Lea Pericoli and Silvana Lazzarino. They are one of four nations to have competed in every edition of the tournament. Italy won the Cup in 2006, 2009, 2010, 2013, 2024 and 2025. Their six titles since the year 2000 are the most by any country, tied with the Czech Republic.

== Results ==
=== 1963–1979 ===
| Tournament | 1963 | 1964 | 1965 | 1966 | 1967 | 1968 | 1969 | 1970 | 1971 | 1972 | 1973 | 1974 | 1975 | 1976 | 1977 | 1978 | 1979 |
|---|---|---|---|---|---|---|---|---|---|---|---|---|---|---|---|---|---|
Federation Cup
| World Group | 1R | 2R | QF | QF | QF | 2R | QF | 2R | 1R | QF | 1R | QF | QF | 2R | LQ | 1R | 2R |
| Consolation Rounds | Not Held | | | | | | A | A | 1R | A | 2R | NH | A | A | 2R | NH | A |
| Win–loss | 0–1 | 0–1 | 1–1 | 1–1 | 2–1 | 1–1 | 1–1 | 0–1 | 0–2 | 2–1 | 0–2 | 2–1 | 2–1 | 1–1 | 1–2 | 0–1 | 1–1 |

=== 1980–1994 ===
| Tournament | 1980 | 1981 | 1982 | 1983 | 1984 | 1985 | 1986 | 1987 | 1988 | 1989 | 1990 | 1991 | 1992 | 1993 | 1994 |
|---|---|---|---|---|---|---|---|---|---|---|---|---|---|---|---|
Federation Cup
| World Group | 2R | 2R | 1R | 2R | QF | QF | QF | 2R | 2R | 1R | 2R | QF | 1R | 2R | 2R |
| Consolation Rounds | A | SF | SF | A | A | A | A | A | A | QF | A | A | 1R | A | NH |
| Win–loss | 1–1 | 4–2 | 1–2 | 1–1 | 2–1 | 2–1 | 2–1 | 1–1 | 1–1 | 1–2 | 1–1 | 2–1 | 0–2 | 1–1 | 1–1 |

=== 1995–2019 ===
| Tournament | 1995 | 1996 | 1997 | 1998 | 1999 | 2000 | 2001 | 2002 | 2003 | 2004 | 2005 | 2006 | 2007 | 2008 | 2009 | 2010 | 2011 | 2012 | 2013 | 2014 | 2015 | 2016 | 2017 | 2018 | 2019 | W–L |
|---|---|---|---|---|---|---|---|---|---|---|---|---|---|---|---|---|---|---|---|---|---|---|---|---|---|---|
Fed Cup
| World Group | A | A | A | A | SF | 8th | A | SF | QF | QF | QF | W | F | QF | W | W | SF | SF | W | SF | QF | QF | A | A | A | 24–14 |
| World Group play-offs | A | A | A | W | A | NH | 2R | A | A | A | W | A | A | W | A | A | A | A | A | A | W | L | A | L | A | 5–3 |
| World Group II | L | A | A | W | A | Not Held | | | | | A | A | A | A | A | A | A | A | A | A | A | A | L | W | L | 2–3 |
| World Group II play-offs | L | A | W | A | A | Not Held | | | | | A | A | A | A | A | A | A | A | A | A | A | A | W | A | L | 2–2 |
| Europe/Africa Group I | A | SF | W | A | A | A | A | A | A | A | A | A | A | A | A | A | A | A | A | A | A | A | A | A | A | 8–1 |
| Win–loss | 0–2 | 3–1 | 6–0 | 2–0 | 1–1 | 1–2 | 1–1 | 2–1 | 1–1 | 1–1 | 1–1 | 3–0 | 2–1 | 1–1 | 3–0 | 3–0 | 1–1 | 1–1 | 3–0 | 1–1 | 2–1 | 0–2 | 1–1 | 1–1 | 0–2 | 77–62 |
| Year End Ranking | | | | | | | | 7 | 7 | 8 | 8 | 2 | 2 | 2 | 1 | 1 | 1 | 2 | | | | | | | | |

=== 2020–2025 ===
| Tournament | 2020 | 2021 | 2022 | 2023 | 2024 | 2025 | W–L |
|---|---|---|---|---|---|---|---|
Billie Jean King Cup
| Finals | P | A | GS | F | W | W | 9–3 |
| Qualifying round | A | NH | W | W | A | A | 2–0 |
| Play-offs | P | W | A | A | A | A | 1–0 |
| Europe/Africa Group I | W | NH | A | A | A | A | 12–1 |
| Win–loss | 4–0 | 1–0 | 1–2 | 4–1 | 3–0 | 3–0 | 93–65 |

=== Records ===
==== Longest winning streak ====
| Year | Competition | Date | Location | Opponent | Score | Result |
|---|---|---|---|---|---|---|
| 1997 | Europe/Africa Zone Group I – Pool B | 22 April | Bari (ITA) | Romania | 2–1 | Won |
| 1997 | Europe/Africa Zone Group I – Pool B | 23 April | Bari (ITA) | Ukraine | 3–0 | Won |
| 1997 | Europe/Africa Zone Group I – Pool B | 24 April | Bari (ITA) | Sweden | 3–0 | Won |
| 1997 | Europe/Africa Zone Group I – Semifinals | 25 April | Bari (ITA) | Greece | 3–0 | Won |
| 1997 | Europe/Africa Zone Group I – Final | 26 April | Bari (ITA) | Hungary | 2–1 | Won |
| 1997 | World Group II play-offs | 12–13 July | Jakarta (INA) | Indonesia | 5–0 | Won |
| 1998 | World Group II | 18–19 April | Foligno (ITA) | Austria | 3–2 | Won |
| 1998 | World Group play-offs | 25–26 July | Prague (CZE) | Czech Republic | 4–1 | Won |
| 1999 | World Group, First Round | 17–18 April | Reggio Calabria (ITA) | Spain | 3–2 | Won |
| 1999 | World Group, Semifinals | 24–25 July | Ancona (ITA) | United States | 1–4 | Lost |

=== Finals: 8 (6 titles, 2 runner-up) ===
| Outcome | Year | Venue | Surface | Team | Opponents | Opposing Team | Score |
|---|---|---|---|---|---|---|---|
| Winner | 2006 | Spiroudome, Charleroi, Belgium | Hard (i) | Francesca Schiavone; Flavia Pennetta; Mara Santangelo; Roberta Vinci | Belgium | Kirsten Flipkens; Justine Henin-Hardenne | 3–2 |
| Runner-up | 2007 | Luzhniki Palace of Sports, Moscow, Russia | Hard (i) | Francesca Schiavone; Mara Santangelo; Roberta Vinci; Tathiana Garbin; Flavia Pennetta | Russia | Svetlana Kuznetsova; Elena Vesnina; Anna Chakvetadze | 0–4 |
| Winner | 2009 | Circolo del Tennis, Reggio Calabria, Italy | Clay | Flavia Pennetta; Francesca Schiavone; Sara Errani; Roberta Vinci | United States | Melanie Oudin; Alexa Glatch; Liezel Huber; Vania King | 4–0 |
| Winner | 2010 | San Diego Sports Arena, San Diego, United States | Hard (i) | Flavia Pennetta; Francesca Schiavone; Sara Errani; Roberta Vinci | United States | Melanie Oudin; Coco Vandeweghe; Bethanie Mattek-Sands | 3–1 |
| Winner | 2013 | Tennis Club Cagliari, Cagliari, Italy | Clay | Flavia Pennetta; Karin Knapp; Sara Errani; Roberta Vinci | Russia | Alexandra Panova; Irina Khromacheva; Alisa Kleybanova; Margarita Gasparyan | 4–0 |
| Runner-up | 2023 | Estadio de La Cartuja, Sevilla, Spain | Hard (i) | Jasmine Paolini; Martina Trevisan; Elisabetta Cocciaretto; Lucia Bronzetti; Lucrezia Stefanini | Canada | Leylah Fernandez; Rebecca Marino; Marina Stakusic; Eugenie Bouchard; Gabriela Dabrowski | 0–2 |
| Winner | 2024 | Martín Carpena Arena, Málaga, Spain | Hard (i) | Jasmine Paolini; Martina Trevisan; Elisabetta Cocciaretto; Lucia Bronzetti; Sara Errani | Slovakia | Rebecca Šramková; Anna Karolína Schmiedlová; Viktória Hrunčáková; Renáta Jamrichová; Tereza Mihalíková | 2–0 |
| Winner | 2025 | Shenzhen Bay Sports Center, Shenzhen, China | Hard (i) | Jasmine Paolini; Lucia Bronzetti; Elisabetta Cocciaretto; Tyra Caterina Grant; Sara Errani | United States | Jessica Pegula; Emma Navarro; McCartney Kessler; Hailey Baptiste; Taylor Townsend | 2–0 |

== See also ==
- Billie Jean King Cup
- Italy Davis Cup team
- Italy at the Hopman Cup
- Tennis in Italy
- Italian Tennis and Padel Federation
