= 2007 Fed Cup World Group =

Part of tennis tournament

- Date: 21 April – 16 September
- Edition: 17th

Champions
- Russia
- Fed Cup

The World Group was the highest level of Fed Cup competition in 2007. Eight nations competed in a three-round knockout competition. Italy was the defending champion, but they were defeated in the final by the No. 1 team Russia.

== Participating teams ==
Participating teams
Belgium	China	France	Italy
Japan	Russia	Spain	United States

== Draw ==
Quarterfinals; 21–22 April
Castellaneta Marina, Italy (Outdoor clay)
1	Italy	5
China	0
Limoges, France (Indoor clay)
Japan	0
4	France	5
Moscow, Russia (Indoor clay)
3	Russia	5
Spain	0
Delray Beach, FL, United States (Outdoor hard)
United States	5
2	Belgium	0

Semifinals; 14–15 July
Castellaneta Marina, Italy (Outdoor clay)
1	Italy	3
4	France	2
Stowe, VT, United States (Outdoor hard)
3	Russia	3
United States	2

Final; 15–16 September
Moscow, Russia (Indoor hard)
1	Italy	0
3	Russia	4

== First round ==
=== Italy vs. China ===
Italy
5
Nova Yardinia, Castellaneta, Italy
21–22 April 2007
Red clay (outdoors)

China
0

			1	2	3
1	(Italy) (China)	Tathiana Garbin; Sun Tiantian	6; 4	2; 6	6; 3
2	(Italy) (China)	Flavia Pennetta; Peng Shuai	0; 6	7; 5	3; 0	retired
3	(Italy) (China)	Tathiana Garbin; Zhang Shuai	3; 6	6; 2	6; 4
4	(Italy) (China)	Mara Santangelo; Sun Tiantian	6; 4	6; 2
5	(Italy) (China)	Mara Santangelo / Roberta Vinci; Sun Shengnan / Sun Tiantian	6; 2	6; 4

=== Japan vs. France ===
Japan
0
Palais des Sports de Fetes, Limoges, France
21–22 April 2007
Red clay (indoors)

France
5

			1	2	3
1	(Japan) (France)	Ai Sugiyama; Nathalie Dechy	5; 7	1; 6
2	(Japan) (France)	Akiko Morigami; Tatiana Golovin	2; 6	4; 6
3	(Japan) (France)	Ai Sugiyama; Tatiana Golovin	6^{3} 7^{7}	0; 6
4	(Japan) (France)	Akiko Morigami; Virginie Razzano	6^{4} 7^{7}	6; 1	2; 6
5	(Japan) (France)	Ayumi Morita / Ai Sugiyama; Séverine Brémond / Nathalie Dechy	1; 6	2; 6

=== Russia vs. Spain ===
Russia
5
Luzhniki Palace of Sports, Moscow, Russia
21–22 April 2007
Red clay (indoors)

Spain
0

			1	2	3
1	(Russia) (Spain)	Nadia Petrova; Anabel Medina Garrigues	6; 3	6; 4
2	(Russia) (Spain)	Svetlana Kuznetsova; Lourdes Domínguez Lino	6; 3	6; 2
3	(Russia) (Spain)	Svetlana Kuznetsova; Anabel Medina Garrigues	6; 3	4; 6	6; 0
4	(Russia) (Spain)	Anna Chakvetadze; Nuria Llagostera Vives	3; 6	7^{7} 6^{5}	6; 2
5	(Russia) (Spain)	Nadia Petrova / Elena Vesnina; Lourdes Domínguez Lino / Laura Pous Tió	6; 1	4; 6	6; 2

=== United States vs. Belgium ===
United States
5
Delray Beach Tennis Center, Delray Beach, Florida, United States
21–22 April 2007
Plexipave (outdoors)

Belgium
0

			1	2	3
1	(United States) (Belgium)	Venus Williams; Kirsten Flipkens	7; 5	6; 2
2	(United States) (Belgium)	Serena Williams; Caroline Maes	6; 1	6; 4
3	(United States) (Belgium)	Vania King; Kirsten Flipkens	4; 6	6; 4	7; 5
4	(United States) (Belgium)	Venus Williams; Yanina Wickmayer	6; 1	6; 2
5	(United States) (Belgium)	Vania King / Lisa Raymond; Tamaryn Hendler / Caroline Maes	6; 1	6; 2

== Semifinals ==
=== Italy vs. France ===
Italy
3
Nova Yardinia, Castellaneta, Italy
14–15 July 2007
Red clay (outdoors)

France
2

			1	2	3
1	(Italy) (France)	Tathiana Garbin; Tatiana Golovin	3; 6	6; 2	2; 6
2	(Italy) (France)	Francesca Schiavone; Amélie Mauresmo	7; 5	6; 3
3	(Italy) (France)	Mara Santangelo; Amélie Mauresmo	7^{7} 6^{5}	0; 6	4; 6
4	(Italy) (France)	Francesca Schiavone; Tatiana Golovin	6; 4	2; 6	7; 5
5	(Italy) (France)	Francesca Schiavone / Roberta Vinci; Séverine Brémond / Nathalie Dechy	4; 6	6; 1	6; 2

=== Russia vs. United States ===
Russia
3
The Stadium at Topnotch, Stowe, United States
14–15 July 2007
Decoturf (outdoors)

United States
2

			1	2	3
1	(Russia) (United States)	Anna Chakvetadze; Vania King	6; 1	6; 3
2	(Russia) (United States)	Nadia Petrova; Venus Williams	6^{6} 7^{8}	6; 0	4; 6
3	(Russia) (United States)	Anna Chakvetadze; Venus Williams	1; 6	4; 6
4	(Russia) (United States)	Nadia Petrova; Meilen Tu	6; 1	6; 2
5	(Russia) (United States)	Nadia Petrova / Elena Vesnina; Venus Williams / Lisa Raymond	7; 5	7^{7} 6^{1}

== Final ==
=== Italy vs. Russia ===
Italy
0
Luzhniki Palace of Sports, Moscow, Russia
15–16 September 2007
RuKortHard (indoors)

Russia
4

			1	2	3
1	(Italy) (Russia)	Francesca Schiavone; Anna Chakvetadze	4; 6	6; 4	4; 6
2	(Italy) (Russia)	Mara Santangelo; Svetlana Kuznetsova	1; 6	2; 6
3	(Italy) (Russia)	Francesca Schiavone; Svetlana Kuznetsova	6; 4	6^{7} 7^{9}	5; 7
4	(Italy) (Russia)	Mara Santangelo; Elena Vesnina	2; 6	4; 6
5	(Italy) (Russia)	Mara Santangelo / Roberta Vinci; Nadia Petrova / Elena Vesnina				not played

2007 Fed Cup champions

Russia
Third title

== See also ==
- Fed Cup structure
