= 2004 Fed Cup World Group =

Part of tennis tournament

- Date: 24 April – 28 November
- Edition: 14th

Champions
- Russia
- Fed Cup

The World Group was the highest level of Fed Cup competition in 2004. Sixteen nations competed in a four-round knockout competition. World No. 1 team France was the defending champion, but they were defeated in the final by World No. 5 team and four-time finalist Russia. As such, Russia ascended to World No. 2.

== Participating teams ==
Participating teams
| Argentina | Australia | Austria | Belgium |
| Croatia | Czech Republic | France | Germany |
| Japan | Italy | Russia | Slovakia |
| Slovenia | Spain | Switzerland | United States |

== Draw ==
First round 24–25 April
Amiens, France (Indoor clay)
1 | France | 5
Germany | 0
Lecce, Italy (Outdoor clay)
Czech Republic | 1
7 | Italy | 3
Los Belones, Murcia, Spain (Outdoor clay)
6 | Spain | 3
Switzerland | 2
Bree, Belgium (Indoor clay)
Croatia | 2
3 | Belgium | 3
Moscow, Russia (Indoor carpet)
4 | Russia | 4
Australia | 1
Buenos Aires, Argentina (Outdoor clay)
Argentina | 4
8 | Japan | 1
Sankt Pölten, Austria (Outdoor clay)
5 | Slovakia | 2
Austria | 3
Portorož, Slovenia (Outdoor clay)
Slovenia | 1
2 | United States | 4

Quarterfinals; 10–11 July
Rimini, Italy (Outdoor clay)
1 | France | 3
7 | Italy | 2
Jerez, Spain (Outdoor clay)
5 | Spain | 3
3 | Belgium | 2
Buenos Aires, Argentina (Outdoor clay)
4 | Russia | 4
Argentina | 1
Innsbruck, Austria (Outdoor clay)
Austria | 4
2 | United States | 1

Semifinals; 24–25 November
Moscow, Russia (Indoor carpet)
1 | France | 5
5 | Spain | 0
Moscow, Russia (Indoor carpet)
4 | Russia | 5
Austria | 0

Final; 27–28 November
Moscow, Russia (Indoor carpet)
1 | France | 2
4 | Russia | 3

== First round ==
=== France vs. Germany ===
France
5
Coliséum, Amiens, France
24–25 April 2004
Red clay (indoors)

Germany
0

| | | | 1 | 2 | 3 |
|---|---|---|---|---|---|
| 1 | (France) (Germany) | Nathalie Dechy; Anna-Lena Grönefeld | 6^{4} 7^{7} | 6; 1 | 6; 4 |
| 2 | (France) (Germany) | Amélie Mauresmo; Barbara Rittner | 6; 1 | 6; 2 |
| 3 | (France) (Germany) | Amélie Mauresmo; Anna-Lena Grönefeld | 6; 2 | 6; 3 |
| 4 | (France) (Germany) | Émilie Loit; Julia Schruff | 6; 2 | 6; 2 |
| 5 | (France) (Germany) | Nathalie Dechy / Amélie Mauresmo; Anna-Lena Grönefeld / Julia Schruff | 6; 2 | 6; 0 |

=== Czech Republic vs. Italy ===
Czech Republic
1
Circolo Tennis Maglie, Lecce, Italy
24–25 April 2004
Red clay (outdoors)

Italy
3

| | | | 1 | 2 | 3 |
|---|---|---|---|---|---|---|
| 1 | (Czech Republic) (Italy) | Barbora Strýcová; Francesca Schiavone | 7; 5 | 1; 6 | 0; 6 |
| 2 | (Czech Republic) (Italy) | Klára Koukalová; Silvia Farina Elia | 3; 6 | 6^{3} 7^{7} |
| 3 | (Czech Republic) (Italy) | Barbora Strýcová; Maria Elena Camerin | 7; 5 | 3; 6 | 7; 5 |
| 4 | (Czech Republic) (Italy) | Klára Koukalová; Francesca Schiavone | 6; 1 | 2; 6 | 2; 6 |
| 5 | (Czech Republic) (Italy) | Libuše Průšová / Nicole Vaidišová; Silvia Farina Elia / Francesca Schiavone | | | | not played |

=== Spain vs. Switzerland ===
Spain
3
Centro Tenis La Manga Club, Los Belones, Spain
24–25 April 2004
Red clay (outdoors)

Switzerland
2

| | | | 1 | 2 | 3 |
|---|---|---|---|---|---|
| 1 | (Spain) (Switzerland) | Marta Marrero; Patty Schnyder | 6; 3 | 6^{6} 7^{8} | 5; 7 |
| 2 | (Spain) (Switzerland) | Conchita Martínez; Emmanuelle Gagliardi | 2; 6 | 6; 1 | 6; 0 |
| 3 | (Spain) (Switzerland) | Conchita Martínez; Patty Schnyder | 6; 3 | 6; 4 |
| 4 | (Spain) (Switzerland) | Marta Marrero; Myriam Casanova | 7^{7} 6^{4} | 4; 6 | 0; 6 |
| 5 | (Spain) (Switzerland) | Conchita Martínez / Virginia Ruano Pascual; Myriam Casanova / Emmanuelle Gagliardi | 7^{7} 6^{3} | 6; 2 |

=== Croatia vs. Belgium ===
Croatia
2
Expodroom Bree, Bree, Belgium
24–25 April 2004
Red clay (indoors)

Belgium
3

| | | | 1 | 2 | 3 |
|---|---|---|---|---|---|
| 1 | (Croatia) (Belgium) | Jelena Kostanić; Kim Clijsters | 1; 6 | 6; 4 | 1; 6 |
| 2 | (Croatia) (Belgium) | Karolina Šprem; Kirsten Flipkens | 6; 2 | 6; 0 |
| 3 | (Croatia) (Belgium) | Karolina Šprem; Kim Clijsters | 1; 6 | 3; 6 |
| 4 | (Croatia) (Belgium) | Jelena Kostanić; Els Callens | 2; 6 | 6; 3 | 4; 6 |
| 5 | (Croatia) (Belgium) | Darija Jurak / Iva Majoli; Elke Clijsters / Kirsten Flipkens | 6; 4 | 6; 1 |

=== Russia vs. Australia ===
Russia
4
Luzhniki Olympic Complex, Moscow, Russia
24–25 April 2004
Taraflex (indoors)

Australia
1

| | | | 1 | 2 | 3 |
|---|---|---|---|---|---|
| 1 | (Russia) (Australia) | Anastasia Myskina; Samantha Stosur | 6; 4 | 6; 1 |
| 2 | (Russia) (Australia) | Svetlana Kuznetsova; Alicia Molik | 6; 4 | 3; 6 | 6; 4 |
| 3 | (Russia) (Australia) | Anastasia Myskina; Alicia Molik | 3; 6 | 3; 6 |
| 4 | (Russia) (Australia) | Vera Zvonareva; Samantha Stosur | 6; 2 | 6; 3 |
| 5 | (Russia) (Australia) | Svetlana Kuznetsova / Elena Likhovtseva; Alicia Molik / Rennae Stubbs | 6; 2 | 3; 6 | 7^{9} 6^{7} |

=== Argentina vs. Japan ===
Argentina
4
Buenos Aires Lawn Tennis Club, Buenos Aires, Argentina
24–25 April 2004
Red clay (outdoors)

Japan
1

| | | | 1 | 2 | 3 |
|---|---|---|---|---|---|---|
| 1 | (Argentina) (Japan) | Gisela Dulko; Ai Sugiyama | 6; 3 | 6; 4 |
| 2 | (Argentina) (Japan) | Paola Suárez; Akiko Morigami | 6; 4 | 6; 0 |
| 3 | (Argentina) (Japan) | Paola Suárez; Ai Sugiyama | 6^{4} 7^{7} | 6; 3 | 7; 6 | retired |
| 4 | (Argentina) (Japan) | Gisela Dulko; Akiko Morigami | 2; 6 | 2; 6 |
| 5 | (Argentina) (Japan) | Mariana Díaz Oliva / Patricia Tarabini; Shinobu Asagoe / Saori Obata | 7^{7} 6^{4} | 6^{4} 7^{7} | 6; 2 |

=== Slovakia vs. Austria ===
Slovakia
2
Sankt Pölten Tennis Centre, Sankt Pölten, Austria
24–25 April 2004
Red clay (outdoors)

Austria
3

| | | | 1 | 2 | 3 |
|---|---|---|---|---|---|
| 1 | (Slovakia) (Austria) | Janette Husárová; Barbara Schett | 6; 4 | 1; 6 | 4; 6 |
| 2 | (Slovakia) (Austria) | Ľudmila Cervanová; Barbara Schwartz | 6; 3 | 6^{1} 7^{7} | 2; 6 |
| 3 | (Slovakia) (Austria) | Martina Suchá; Barbara Schett | 5; 7 | 6; 1 | 2; 6 |
| 4 | (Slovakia) (Austria) | Janette Husárová; Sybille Bammer | 6; 3 | 6; 2 |
| 5 | (Slovakia) (Austria) | Ľudmila Cervanová / Janette Husárová; Barbara Schwartz / Patricia Wartusch | 6; 3 | 3; 6 | 6; 4 |

=== Slovenia vs. United States ===
Slovenia
1
SRC Marina Portorož, Portorož, Slovenia
24–25 April 2004
Red clay (outdoors)

United States
4

| | | | 1 | 2 | 3 |
|---|---|---|---|---|---|
| 1 | (Slovenia) (United States) | Tina Pisnik; Lisa Raymond | 7; 5 | 7; 5 |
| 2 | (Slovenia) (United States) | Katarina Srebotnik; Venus Williams | 1; 6 | 2; 6 |
| 3 | (Slovenia) (United States) | Tina Pisnik; Venus Williams | 3; 6 | 1; 6 |
| 4 | (Slovenia) (United States) | Katarina Srebotnik; Lisa Raymond | 7; 5 | 3; 6 | 4; 6 |
| 5 | (Slovenia) (United States) | Tina Križan / Katarina Srebotnik; Martina Navratilova / Lisa Raymond | 1; 6 | 6; 1 | 0; 6 |

== Quarterfinals ==
=== France vs. Italy ===
France
3
Circolo Tennis Rimini, Rimini, Italy
10–11 July 2004
Red clay (outdoors)

Italy
2

| | | | 1 | 2 | 3 |
|---|---|---|---|---|---|
| 1 | (France) (Italy) | Amélie Mauresmo; Silvia Farina Elia | 6; 2 | 6; 1 |
| 2 | (France) (Italy) | Mary Pierce; Francesca Schiavone | 6; 3 | 6; 4 |
| 3 | (France) (Italy) | Amélie Mauresmo; Francesca Schiavone | 7^{7} 6^{2} | 6; 2 |
| 4 | (France) (Italy) | Émilie Loit; Silvia Farina Elia | 3; 6 | 6; 2 | 2; 6 |
| 5 | (France) (Italy) | Tatiana Golovin / Mary Pierce; Tathiana Garbin / Roberta Vinci | 0; 6 | 6^{5} 7^{7} |

=== Spain vs. Belgium ===
Spain
3
Club Nazaret, Jerez de la Frontera, Spain
10–11 July 2004
Red clay (indoors)

Belgium
2

| | | | 1 | 2 | 3 |
|---|---|---|---|---|---|
| 1 | (Spain) (Belgium) | Anabel Medina Garrigues; Kirsten Flipkens | 6^{5} 7^{7} | 6; 1 | 2; 6 |
| 2 | (Spain) (Belgium) | Virginia Ruano Pascual; Els Callens | 6; 2 | 4; 6 | 9; 11 |
| 3 | (Spain) (Belgium) | Anabel Medina Garrigues; Els Callens | 6; 4 | 6; 0 |
| 4 | (Spain) (Belgium) | María Sánchez Lorenzo; Kirsten Flipkens | 6; 3 | 6; 4 |
| 5 | (Spain) (Belgium) | Anabel Medina Garrigues / Virginia Ruano Pascual; Els Callens / Kirsten Flipkens | 6; 3 | 6; 2 |

=== Russia vs. Argentina ===
Russia
4
Buenos Aires Lawn Tennis Club, Buenos Aires, Argentina
10–11 July 2004
Red clay (outdoors)

Argentina
1

| | | | 1 | 2 | 3 |
|---|---|---|---|---|---|
| 1 | (Russia) (Argentina) | Svetlana Kuznetsova; Gisela Dulko | 4; 6 | 6; 3 | 4; 6 |
| 2 | (Russia) (Argentina) | Anastasia Myskina; Natalia Gussoni | 6; 3 | 6; 0 |
| 3 | (Russia) (Argentina) | Anastasia Myskina; Gisela Dulko | 6; 1 | 7; 5 |
| 4 | (Russia) (Argentina) | Vera Zvonareva; Mariana Díaz Oliva | 6; 3 | 6; 0 |
| 5 | (Russia) (Argentina) | Svetlana Kuznetsova / Elena Likhovtseva; Gisela Dulko / Patricia Tarabini | 6; 2 | 5; 7 | 6; 4 |

=== Austria vs. United States ===
Austria
4
Bergisel Stadion, Innsbruck, Austria
10–11 July 2004
Red clay (outdoors)

United States
1

| | | | 1 | 2 | 3 |
|---|---|---|---|---|---|
| 1 | (Austria) (United States) | Barbara Schwartz; Chanda Rubin | 1; 6 | 7; 5 | 4; 6 |
| 2 | (Austria) (United States) | Barbara Schett; Lisa Raymond | 6; 2 | 6; 4 |
| 3 | (Austria) (United States) | Barbara Schett; Chanda Rubin | 6; 3 | 6; 2 |
| 4 | (Austria) (United States) | Barbara Schwartz; Lisa Raymond | 7^{7} 6^{3} | 4; 6 | 10; 8 |
| 5 | (Austria) (United States) | Barbara Schett / Patricia Wartusch; Jill Craybas / Martina Navratilova | 6; 3 | 0; 6 | 6; 3 |

== Semifinals ==
=== France vs. Spain ===
France
5
Ice Stadium Krylatskoe, Moscow, Russia
24–25 November 2004
Taraflex (indoors)

Spain
0

| | | | 1 | 2 | 3 |
|---|---|---|---|---|---|
| 1 | (France) (Spain) | Tatiana Golovin; Anabel Medina Garrigues | 6; 3 | 6; 3 |
| 2 | (France) (Spain) | Nathalie Dechy; María Sánchez Lorenzo | 6; 2 | 6; 4 |
| 3 | (France) (Spain) | Nathalie Dechy; Anabel Medina Garrigues | 6; 3 | 6; 1 |
| 4 | (France) (Spain) | Tatiana Golovin; Marta Marrero | 6; 3 | 6; 4 |
| 5 | (France) (Spain) | Marion Bartoli / Émilie Loit; Marta Marrero / Virginia Ruano Pascual | 7; 5 | 6; 2 |

=== Russia vs. Austria ===
Russia
5
Ice Stadium Krylatskoe, Moscow, Russia
24–25 November 2004
Taraflex (indoors)

Austria
0

| | | | 1 | 2 | 3 |
|---|---|---|---|---|---|
| 1 | (Russia) (Austria) | Svetlana Kuznetsova; Yvonne Meusburger | 6; 1 | 6; 1 |
| 2 | (Russia) (Austria) | Anastasia Myskina; Patricia Wartusch | 6; 0 | 6; 0 |
| 3 | (Russia) (Austria) | Anastasia Myskina; Yvonne Meusburger | 3; 6 | 6; 3 | 6; 1 |
| 4 | (Russia) (Austria) | Svetlana Kuznetsova; Daniela Kix | 6; 1 | 6; 1 |
| 5 | (Russia) (Austria) | Svetlana Kuznetsova / Elena Likhovtseva; Yvonne Meusburger / Patricia Wartusch | 6; 2 | 6; 2 |

== Final ==
=== France vs. Russia ===
France
2
Ice Stadium Krylatskoe, Moscow, Russia
27–28 November 2004
Taraflex (indoors)

Russia
3

| | | | 1 | 2 | 3 |
|---|---|---|---|---|---|
| 1 | (France) (Russia) | Nathalie Dechy; Svetlana Kuznetsova | 3; 6 | 7^{7} 6^{4} | 8; 6 |
| 2 | (France) (Russia) | Tatiana Golovin; Anastasia Myskina | 4; 6 | 6^{5} 7^{7} |
| 3 | (France) (Russia) | Nathalie Dechy; Anastasia Myskina | 3; 6 | 4; 6 |
| 4 | (France) (Russia) | Tatiana Golovin; Svetlana Kuznetsova | 6; 4 | 6; 1 |
| 5 | (France) (Russia) | Marion Bartoli / Émilie Loit; Anastasia Myskina / Vera Zvonareva | 6^{5} 7^{7} | 5; 7 |

2004 Fed Cup champions

Russia
First title

== See also ==
- Fed Cup structure
