= Netherlands Antilles Tennis Federation =

Governing body of tennis in the Netherlands Antilles

- Sport: Tennis
- Abbreviation: NATF
- Affiliation: International Tennis Federation
- Affiliation date: -2011
- Regional affiliation: Central American & Caribbean Tennis Confederation
- Location: Willemstad, Curaçao

Official website
- www.natf.an
- (Netherlands Antilles)

The Netherlands Antilles Tennis Federation was the governing body of tennis in the Netherlands Antilles. It was responsible for the Netherlands Antilles Davis Cup team. After the dissolution of the Netherlands Antilles in 2010, it represented three newly formed association in 2011:

- Bonaire Lawn Tennis Association
- Curaçao Lawn Tennis Association
- Sint Maarten Tennis Federation

The teams of Bonaire and Curaçao gained individual membership of the International Tennis Federation as well as the Central American & Caribbean Tennis Confederation in 2012.

== See also ==
- Royal Dutch Lawn Tennis Association
