= Tennis at the 2003 Pan American Games =

- Date: 04-10 August
- Edition: 13
- Location: Centro Nacional de Tenis

Champions

Men's singles
- Fernando Meligeni (BRA)

Women's singles
- Milagros Sequera (VEN)

Men's doubles
- Santiago Gonzalez / Alejandro Hernandez (MEX)

Women's doubles
- Bruna Colósio / Joana Cortez (BRA)
- Pan American Games

Tennis at the 2003 Pan American Games was played at the Centro Nacional de Tenis.

== Medal summary ==
Event:	Gold	Silver	Bronze
Men
Men's singles	Fernando Meligeni; Brazil	Marcelo Ríos; Chile	José de Armas; Venezuela; Alex Kim; United States
Men's doubles	Santiago González / Alejandro Hernández; Mexico	Adrián García / Marcelo Ríos; Chile	Cristian Villagrán / Carlos Berlocq; Argentina; Jeff Morrison / Alex Bogomolov Jr. United States
Women
Women's singles	Milagros Sequera; Venezuela	Sarah Taylor; United States	Kristina Brandi; Puerto Rico; Ansley Cargill; United States
Women's doubles	Bruna Colósio / Joana Cortez; Brazil	Kristina Brandi / Vilmarie Castellvi; Puerto Rico	Yamile Fors Guerra / Yanet Núñez Mojarena; Cuba; Karin Palme / Melissa Torres Sandoval; Mexico

== Medal table ==
Place	Nation	Gold medal	Silver medal	Bronze medal	Total
1	Brazil	2	0	0	2
2	Mexico	1	0	1	2
3	Venezuela	1	0	1	2
4	Chile	0	2	0	2
5	United States	0	1	3	4
6	Puerto Rico	0	1	1	2
7	Argentina	0	0	1	1
8	Cuba	0	0	1	1
Total		4	4	8	12
