= Bonaire Lawn Tennis Association =

Bonaire Lawn Tennis Association (Dutch: Bonaire Lawn Tennis Bond)
- Sport: Tennis
- Abbreviation: BLTB
- Affiliation: International Tennis Federation
- Affiliation date: 2011
- Regional affiliation: Central American & Caribbean Tennis Confederation
- Affiliation date: 2011
- Location: Kralendijk
- President: Elchem Trenidad
- Replaced: Netherlands Antilles Lawn Tennis Association

Official website
- www.bltb.org
- (Bonaire)

The Bonaire Lawn Tennis Association (Dutch: Bonaire Lawn Tennis Bond), abbreviated BLTB, is the governing body of tennis in Bonaire. Before Bonaire became a special municipality of the Netherlands after the dissolution of the Netherlands Antilles, it was represented by the Netherlands Antilles Tennis Federation. In 2011, it decided to file for membership of the International Tennis Federation rather than to be part of the Royal Dutch Lawn Tennis Association of the Netherlands. Membership was approved in 2011 at the Annual General Meeting in Bangkok together with the Curaçao Lawn Tennis Association.

== See also ==
- Royal Dutch Lawn Tennis Association
- Netherlands Antilles Tennis Federation
