= Marcelo Ríos =

Chilean tennis player

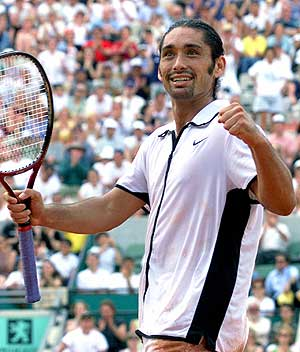
- Ríos in 1998
- Country (sports): Chile
- Residence: Santiago, Chile
- Born: 26 December 1975 (age 50) Santiago, Chile
- Height: 1.75 m (5 ft 9 in)
- Turned pro: 1994
- Retired: 2004
- Plays: Left-handed (two-handed backhand)
- Prize money: US$9,713,771

Singles
- Career record: 391–192 (67.1%)
- Career titles: 18
- Highest ranking: No. 1 (30 March 1998)

Grand Slam singles results
- Australian Open: F (1998)
- French Open: QF (1998, 1999)
- Wimbledon: 4R (1997)
- US Open: QF (1997)

Other tournaments
- Tour Finals: RR (1998)
- Grand Slam Cup: W (1998)
- Olympic Games: 1R (2000)

Doubles
- Career record: 36–57 (38.7%)
- Career titles: 1
- Highest ranking: No. 141 (7 May 2001)

Grand Slam doubles results
- US Open: Q2 (1995)
Medal record
Pan American Games
Silver medal – second place	2003 Santo Domingo	Men's Singles
Silver medal – second place	2003 Santo Domingo	Men's Doubles

Marcelo Andrés Ríos Mayorga (Latin American Spanish: [maɾˈselo ˈri.os]; born 26 December 1975) is a Chilean former professional tennis player. In 1998, he was ranked as the world No. 1 in men's singles by the Association of Tennis Professionals (ATP), becoming the first such Latin American. Ríos won 18 ATP Tour-level singles titles, including five Masters events, and was the runner-up at the 1998 Australian Open. He is the only man to have been world No. 1 in the ATP singles rankings without ever winning a major singles tournament.

Ríos was the first player to win all three clay court Masters tournaments (Monte Carlo, Rome, and Hamburg) since the format began in 1990. He was also the third man (after Michael Chang and Pete Sampras) to complete the Sunshine Double (winning Indian Wells and Miami Masters in the same year), which he achieved in 1998. At 1.75 m (5 ft 9 in), Ríos is the shortest man to hold the number 1 ranking. He also held the top ranking in juniors.

Ríos retired from the sport in July 2004 due to a long-term back injury. He played his last ATP Tour-level tournament while only 27 years old at the 2003 French Open.

== Tennis career ==
Ríos turned professional in 1994 and finished 1997, 1998, and 1999 as a top-ten player. Ríos won a total of 18 top-level singles titles and one top-level doubles title during his career.

=== Early years ===
Ríos began playing tennis at the age of 11 at the Sport Francés golf club in Vitacura (Greater Santiago), adjacent to his house.

=== Junior career ===
As a junior, Ríos reached as high as No. 1 in singles and No. 141 in doubles.

Ríos reached the semifinals of the junior French Open in 1993 without dropping a set, where he was defeated by Roberto Carretero-Diaz in straight sets, and won the junior US Open in 1993 while only dropping one set during the entire tournament. He also won his first Satellite tournament in Chile.

=== 1994: Turned professional ===
This was Ríos' first year as a professional player, and he quickly began to acquire international fame after his participation at Roland Garros, where, at just 18 years of age, he faced Pete Sampras in the second round, fighting a hard battle before eventually losing 6–7, 6–7, 4–6. His left-handed ability, plus his novel long hair and backwards visor, drew the attention of the media. The same year he won his first Challenger in Dresden, Germany.

=== 1995: Breakthrough ===
In May 1995, aged 19, Ríos won his first tournament title in Bologna defeating Marcelo Filippini of Uruguay 6–2, 6–4, and breaking into the world's top 50 for the first time. Then in June, he won at Amsterdam in both singles (against Jan Siemerink, 6–4, 7–5, 6–4) and doubles (with Sjeng Schalken) and won the tournament in Kuala Lumpur against Mark Philippoussis 7–6, 6–2. He also reached the final of his home country's ATP tournament in Santiago. Ríos ended the year ranked No. 25 in the world.

=== 1996: Top 10 debut ===
His achievements this year included excellent performances in the Masters Series (then called Super 9) tournaments. He reached the quarterfinals in Masters Series of Stuttgart and Rome, and the semifinals in Indian Wells, Monte Carlo, and Canada. In Sankt Pölten, Austria, he won his fourth career title by defeating the Spaniard Félix Mantilla 6–1, 6–4. Ríos again reached the final in Santiago, and also reached the finals in Barcelona and Scottsdale. For much of the year Ríos would be ranked in the top 10, becoming the first Chilean in history to do so. He finished the year ranked number 11.

=== 1997: Impending dominance ===
In 1997 for the first time in Ríos' career he reached the quarterfinals of a Grand Slam tournament at the Australian Open and again at the US Open. He also won his first Masters title at Monte Carlo; after a first round bye, he beat Andrea Gaudenzi, Albert Costa, Carlos Moyá, Magnus Larsson, and, in the final, Àlex Corretja, 6–4, 6–3, 6–3. Two weeks later, he lost in the final of the Rome Masters against the same Spaniard. Other successes for the year included the quarterfinals (again) in the Stuttgart Masters and the finals in Marseille, Boston, and (for the third time) in Santiago. Ríos had a very consistent 1997 season, being the only player to reach the fourth round or better on all Grand Slams. Ríos went as high as No. 6 during the year, and ended the year in the top ten for the first time, being No. 10.

=== 1998: World No. 1 in singles, first Grand Slam final ===
The year 1998 brought the peak of his career, when he reached the No. 1 spot in the world. He won the tournament (the first of the year) in Auckland, New Zealand, against Richard Fromberg, then reached the final of the Australian Open, beating Grant Stafford, Thomas Enqvist, Andrew Ilie, Lionel Roux, Alberto Berasategui and Nicolas Escudé before losing to Petr Korda in a lopsided 2–6, 2–6, 2–6 that lasted 1 hour and 25 minutes. The following months brought successes such as the title of the Super 9 (the current Masters Series) at Indian Wells, where he defeated British Greg Rusedski in the final.

The consummation came in the final at Key Biscayne, Florida, under the guidance of his coach Larry Stefanki. After victories over Hendrik Dreekmann, Tommy Haas, and Goran Ivanišević, Ríos beat Thomas Enqvist in the quarterfinals and Tim Henman in the semifinals. In the final on 29 March, Ríos defeated Andre Agassi 7–5, 6–3, 6–4. In Chile, thousands of people took to the streets to celebrate the triumph of the first Chilean, Latin and indeed Spanish speaking player to reach the sport's No. 1 ranking, grabbing the position from Pete Sampras (who had maintained 102 consecutive weeks at No. 1, and five years ending the season as the leader). In the days ahead, there was a crowded reception leading Ríos to then president Eduardo Frei Ruiz-Tagle on La Moneda Palace, with around 10,000 people cheering at the palace's surroundings. Ríos' No. 1 ranking lasted four weeks; he lost it after being unable to defend the title at Monte Carlo because of an injury suffered in the Davis Cup while defeating Hernán Gumy in Buenos Aires, Argentina. In May, he reached the quarterfinals of the French Open losing to eventual champion Carlos Moyá.

In June, at Wimbledon, Ríos was upset in the first round by Francisco Clavet. However, on 10 August, Ríos regained the No. 1 spot for another two weeks. In September, he lost at third round of the US Open to Magnus Larsson. During this season, Ríos also won the Rome Masters against Albert Costa, who withdrew from the final, Sankt Pölten by defeating Vincent Spadea, the Grand Slam Cup against Andre Agassi, and Singapore by defeating Mark Woodforde. Furthermore, he reached the quarterfinals of the Stuttgart Masters and Paris Masters. In 1998, Ríos won seven titles, including three Masters Series titles, and reached the final of the Australian Open. On 27 July of that year, he reached the maximum number of points achieved throughout his career: 3719 (according to the scoring system used prior to the year 2000). He ended the year ranked No. 2 behind Pete Sampras, who topped the world rankings for a sixth consecutive year.

=== 1999: Continued success and beginning of injuries ===
Ríos maintained a high level throughout 1999, although his game was interrupted by repeated injuries and surgeries. This prevented him from defending the points achieved by reaching the final of the Australian Open the previous year, so he fell several places in the rankings. He reached the final of the Monte Carlo Masters, but after trailing 4–6, 1–2, he had to retire due to a new injury, handing the tournament to Gustavo Kuerten. Ríos subsequently won the Hamburg Masters in a match that lasted more than four hours against Mariano Zabaleta; two weeks later he became champion in Sankt Pölten for the second consecutive time against the same Argentine, who, this time, had to retire during the first set at 4–4. In October, he won at Singapore and reached the final in Beijing, losing to Magnus Norman. He also reached the quarterfinals at Roland Garros and the Stuttgart Masters. Despite many injuries he suffered and surgeries he underwent, Ríos would complete his third consecutive year as a top-ten player, at world No. 9.

=== 2000: Persistent injuries ===
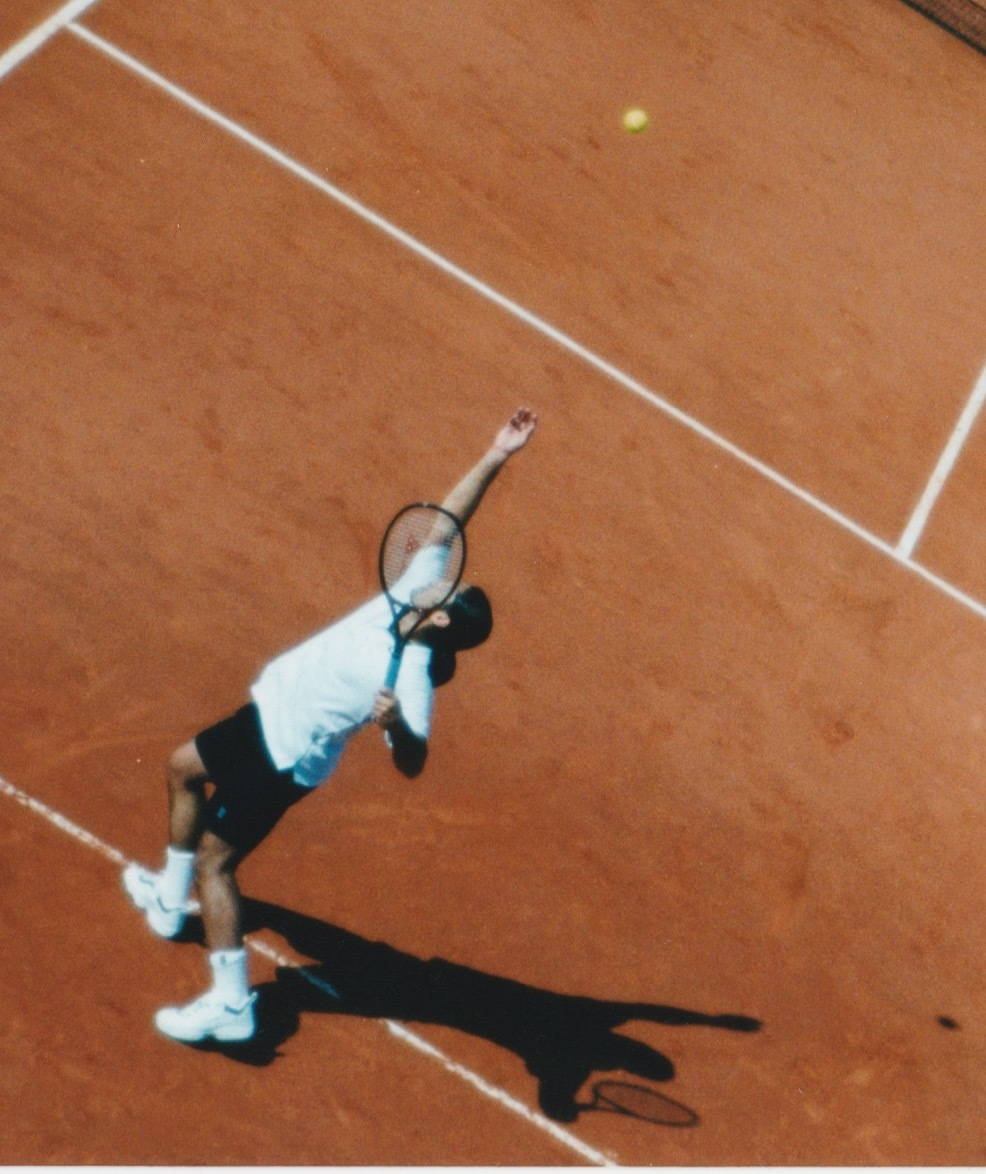
Rios serving at 2000 French Open

Since 2000 until the end of Ríos' career on the main tour, he was not able to keep up his level of play to the standards he set in the previous decade, as it was marked by repeated and disabling injuries. He still won the tournament of Umag, Croatia beating the Argentine Mariano Puerta in the final. He also reached the semifinals at the Hamburg Masters losing to Marat Safin. Ríos finished the year No. 37 in the world.

=== 2001–2002: Decline ===
In 2001, Ríos won the first tournament of the year in Doha. However, his performance in the following tournaments was weaker, weakened by an ankle operation, which resulted in him dropping out of the top 50 in the world for the first time since he was a teenager. In September, Ríos won another title, this time in Hong Kong, defeating Rainer Schüttler in the final. Ríos decided to return in October to play a Challenger event in Santiago in an effort to end his curse of not winning an ATP tournament in his home country. He won the title, beating Edgardo Massa in the final. He also reached a doubles final in Scottsdale. Ríos ended the year as No. 39 in the world.

In early 2002, Ríos had some good results, but a back injury prevented him from continuing the season successfully. It was the same injury that he had already had two operations on, and finally prevented him from returning to a competitive level. His best results were the quarterfinals at the Australian Open, the semifinals at the Miami Masters, and the final in the Stockholm tournament playing the Paradorn Srichaphan. Ríos would finish in the top 25 in the world for the first time since 1999 at No. 24, but without managing to recover from the injuries that beset him since late 1999.

=== 2003: Long absence from tour and out of top 100 ===
Ríos reached the final of the Viña del Mar tournament (formerly the Santiago tournament) but lost to Spaniard David Sánchez. This was the fourth final he has reached and lost in his home country but failed to win. However, representing Chile alongside Fernando González and Nicolás Massú, he won the World Team Cup in Düsseldorf. In the same year, he also won silver medals in singles and doubles with Adrián García in the 2003 Pan American Games. In May, Ríos played his last ATP-level match, losing in the first round of Roland Garros to Mario Ančić and retiring at 1–6, 0–1. In 2003, Ríos played in very few tournaments, most of which he had to withdraw from due to injuries. As a result, he ended the year at No. 105 in the world, his worst year-end ranking on the main tour yet.

=== 2004: Retirement from main tour ===
In 2004, six years after claiming the world No. 1 ranking, and after a long absence from the tour, Ríos returned to competition with a victory at a Challenger Series tournament in Ecuador. He played his last competitive match in early April 2004 at a Challenger in San Luis Potosí, Mexico, where he retired in the round of 16.

Finally, on 16 July 2004, after years of constant injuries—and at just 28 years old—Ríos announced his retirement from tennis during a press conference in Santiago. He organized a farewell tour across his home country, travelling through several cities, meeting with fans, offering tennis clinics, and playing friendly matches with international and local tennis players such as Petr Korda and Goran Ivanišević. The tour ended on 22 December 2004, at a soccer stadium in Santiago, where he played his final tennis match of his career on the main tour against Guillermo Coria.

=== 2015: ITF probe request ===
In 2015, it was announced that the Chile Tennis Federation and Ríos himself were to request a probe by the International Tennis Federation (ITF) into his 1998 Australian Open final opponent Petr Korda's possible doping activity during the tournament. This joint request for a review was submitted to, but later rejected by, the ITF.

=== 2018: Desire for a comeback ===
Following successful elbow surgery in November 2018, Ríos announced a comeback as part of his desire to become the oldest ever winner of a Challenger tournament, though his plans ultimately did not come to fruition.

On 21 December 2018, Ríos defeated Nicolás Lapentti 6–4, 5–7, [11–9] in an exhibition in Chile.

=== ATP Champions Tour ===
==== 2006 ====
On 29 March 2006, Ríos, aged 30, debuted on the ATP Champions Tour, a tour for former tour players, having met the requirement of at least two years after retirement. At his first tournament on the tour in Doha, Qatar, he defeated Thomas Muster, Henri Leconte, Pat Cash, and Cédric Pioline to claim the title. The following week he repeated, this time winning the crown in Hong Kong, where he won the final against Muster. Ríos won six tournaments in a row, adding Algarve, Graz, Paris and Eindhoven to the above. His inclusion on the senior circuit caused mild controversy, as he was significantly younger than many of his fellow competitors. He ended the year as No. 1, winning a total of six tournaments and holding a winning streak of 25 matches, achieving the record of being the only player in history to be No. 1 in the world as a junior, professional and veteran.

==== 2007 ====
Ríos did not take part at the Champions Tour in 2007.

He actually intended to return to the ATP Tour in February at the Viña del Mar tournament (Movistar Open), but he defaulted because of the same back injury that made him retire from the tour.

On 30 March 2007, Ríos played an exhibition match in the Movistar Arena against Andre Agassi, both as a way to commemorate the match where Ríos rose to world No. 1 and as a way of having the American play in Chile.

==== 2008 ====
In 2008, Ríos came back to veteran's tour where he won the tournaments in Barcelona and Algarve. On 22 June 2008, he was defeated by Pete Sampras in the final of a seniors tournament in São Paulo, Brazil. Ríos ended the year as No. 3 in the veteran's world rankings.

On 24 June 2008, Ríos defeated Sampras in an exhibition match that commemorated the 10-year anniversary of having reached the No. 1 ranking in the world.

== Personal life ==
Ríos was born in Santiago, Chile to Jorge Ríos Jarvis, an engineer and businessman, and Alicia Mayorga, a teacher. He has an older sister, Paula.

Ríos met the 14-year-old Costa Rican Giuliana Sotela in September 1998 while he was training at the Nick Bollettieri Tennis Academy in Florida. Ríos and Sotela got married in December 2000 in Santiago. They have a daughter, Constanza, who was born in June 2001. In March 2004, the marriage ended in divorce, which legally took place in Costa Rica, as Chile did not allow married couples the right of divorce until November 2004. During 2004, Ríos worked as a sports commentator for a radio station in Chile.

In April 2005, Ríos married model María Eugenia "Kenita" Larraín, a former fiancée of football player Iván Zamorano. The couple subsequently experienced a very public break-up in September of the same year after an incident in Costa Rica in which Larraín was injured when Ríos allegedly threw her out of his car while he was driving to visit his daughter. Ríos claimed that marrying Larraín was "the biggest mistake of my life." Ríos had previously been in a relationship with Larraín's cousin, Patricia Larraín, from 1995 to 1998.

In May 2008, Ríos married Paula Pavic. They have five children together, daughter Isidora (born December 2008), daughter Colomba (born June 2010), and also triplets, which are a son named Marcelo jr. and two daughters named Antonella and Agustina (all born December 2011). Ríos and Pavic divorced in 2023.

In March 2008, on the tenth anniversary of Ríos reaching the No. 1 ranking, journalist Nelson Flores published a book in Spanish titled El extraño del pelo largo (The strange man with long hair), recounting his experiences following the player from his junior days up to his ascent to the top of the ATP singles ranking.

In May 2014, Ríos said in an interview with El Mercurio that he could have Asperger's syndrome. On 17 November 2016, he confirmed in an interview with Chilevisión that he was diagnosed with Asperger's twice in his life, as a child and during a Davis Cup tie, but he did not care that much until the 2014 interview.

He relocated his family to Sarasota, Florida, in late 2018, according to the website tennis-prose.com.

== Controversies ==
Ríos' career was marked by a number of controversies.

- In 1998, he fired his coach Larry Stefanki shortly after he became world No. 1, claiming that he wanted to go in a different direction.
- After achieving number one in singles, an Argentine reporter asked him what it felt like to be at the same status as Guillermo Vilas; he answered, "I've been compared to Vilas for a while now. I do not know him. All I know is that he was No. 2, and I'm No. 1."
- He was fined US$10,000 for speeding during the 1998 Stuttgart Indoor tournament.
- In a confusing incident, he ran over his physical trainer, Manuel Astorga, in his jeep, causing serious foot injuries. Astorga was later fired as trainer.
- After a magazine published some photos of him dancing seductively with a woman at a Paris disco, his girlfriend (later to be his first wife), Giuliana Sotela, broke up with him. During a Davis Cup press conference, Ríos read a letter, asking Sotela for forgiveness. He ended the press conference in tears.
- He was accused by his second wife, María Eugenia Larraín, of throwing her out of his car while driving to visit his daughter in Costa Rica. Larraín arrived at Santiago's airport in a dramatic fashion, in a wheelchair, and showing multiple bruises on her legs. He claimed that the bruises were not caused by him but were from a skiing accident.
- He was disqualified from the 2000 Mercedes-Benz Cup tennis tournament in Los Angeles, California during a first-round match with Gouichi Motomura of Japan and fined US$5,000 for saying "fuck you" to the chair umpire.
- He was arrested in Rome in 2001 after he punched a taxi driver on the nose and then had a fight with the policemen arresting him.
- In 2003, while training for a Davis Cup tie with Ecuador, he allegedly urinated on some men in a La Serena bar's bathroom and was later expelled from his hotel after being accused of swimming nude. As a consequence, the Chilean team missed a flight to Ecuador the following day. He later apologized for the incidents.
- In 2003, he and a friend were expelled from a Santiago bar after insulting other clients and being involved in a brawl with some waiters. Both were arrested and later released.
- In 2018, Rios was fined $2,500 by the ITF after refusing to be interviewed in his then duty as an assistant to the Chilean Davis Cup team, and instead insulting journalists during a Davis Cup tie vs. Ecuador. He responded to the questions with: "As my personal friend Diego Maradona says, I never speak to reporters as you can all suck it."
- In 2021, during an Instagram livestream, he accused Pamela Jiles, a Chilean deputy, of having tried to rape him as a 14-year-old, claiming that she had attempted to "take a shower" with him after an interview.

== Grand Slam finals ==
=== Singles: 1 (1 runner-up) ===
Result	Year	Championship	Surface	Opponent	Score
Loss	1998	Australian Open	Hard	(Czech Republic) Petr Korda	2–6, 2–6, 2–6

== Grand Slam Cup finals ==
=== Singles: 1 (1–0) ===
Result	Year	Championship	Surface	Opponent	Score
Win	1998	Munich	Hard (i)	(United States) Andre Agassi	6–4, 2–6, 7–6^{(7–1)}, 5–7, 6–3

== Masters Series finals ==
=== Singles: 7 (5–2) ===
Result	Year	Tournament	Surface	Opponent	Score
Win	1997	Monte Carlo Masters	Clay	(Spain) Àlex Corretja	6–4, 6–3, 6–3
Loss	1997	Italian Open	Clay	(Spain) Àlex Corretja	5–7, 5–7, 3–6
Win	1998	Indian Wells Masters	Hard	(United Kingdom) Greg Rusedski	6–3, 6–7^{(15–17)}, 7–6^{(7–4)}, 6–4
Win	1998	Miami Open	Hard	(United States) Andre Agassi	7–5, 6–3, 6–4
Win	1998	Italian Open	Clay	(Spain) Albert Costa	w/o
Loss	1999	Monte-Carlo Masters	Clay	(Brazil) Gustavo Kuerten	4–6, 1–2 ret.
Win	1999	German Open	Clay	(Argentina) Mariano Zabaleta	6–7^{(5–7)}, 7–5, 5–7, 7–6^{(7–5)}, 6–2

== Career finals ==
=== Singles: 31 (18 titles / 13 runner-ups) ===
Legend Grand Slam (0–1) Grand Slam Cup (1–0) ATP Masters Series (5–2) ATP International Series Gold (2–1) ATP International Series (10–9)	Fimals by surface Hard (8–6) Clay (9–7) Grass (0–0) Carpet (1–0)

Result	W-L	Date	Tournament	Surface	Opponent	Score
Win	1–0	May 1995	Bologna Outdoor, Italy	Clay	(Uruguay) Marcelo Filippini	6–2, 6–4
Win	2–0	Jul 1995	Dutch Open, Netherlands	Clay	(Netherlands) Jan Siemerink	6–4, 7–5, 6–4
Win	3–0	Oct 1995	Kuala Lumpur Open, Malaysia	Carpet (i)	(Australia) Mark Philippoussis	7–6^{(8–6)}, 6–2
Loss	3–1	Oct 1995	Chile Open, Santiago	Clay	(Czech Republic) Sláva Doseděl	6–7^{(3–7)}, 3–6
Loss	3–2	Mar 1996	Tennis Channel Open, US	Hard	(South Africa) Wayne Ferreira	6–2, 3–6, 3–6
Loss	3–3	Apr 1996	Barcelona Open, Spain	Clay	(Austria) Thomas Muster	3–6, 6–4, 4–6, 1–6
Win	4–3	May 1996	Sankt Pölten Open, Austria	Clay	(Spain) Fèlix Mantilla	6–2, 6–4
Loss	4–4	Nov 1996	Chile Open, Santiago	Clay	(Argentina) Hernán Gumy	4–6, 5–7
Loss	4–5	Feb 1997	Marseille Open, France	Hard (i)	(Sweden) Thomas Enqvist	4–6, 0–1 ret.
Win	5–5	Apr 1997	Monte Carlo Masters, Monaco	Clay	(Spain) Àlex Corretja	6–4, 6–3, 6–3
Loss	5–6	May 1997	Italian Open, Rome	Clay	(Spain) Àlex Corretja	5–7, 5–7, 3–6
Loss	5–7	Aug 1997	Boston, US	Hard	(Netherlands) Sjeng Schalken	5–7, 3–6
Loss	5–8	Nov 1997	Chile Open, Santiago	Clay	(Spain) Julián Alonso	2–6, 1–6
Win	6–8	Jan 1998	Auckland Open, New Zealand	Hard	(Australia) Richard Fromberg	4–6, 6–4, 7–6^{(7–3)}
Loss	6–9	Feb 1998	Australian Open, Melbourne	Hard	(Czech Republic) Petr Korda	2–6, 2–6, 2–6
Win	7–9	Mar 1998	Indian Wells Masters, US	Hard	(United Kingdom) Greg Rusedski	6–3, 6–7^{(15–17)}, 7–6^{(7–4)}, 6–4
Win	8–9	Mar 1998	Miami Open, US	Hard	(United States) Andre Agassi	7–5, 6–3, 6–4
Win	9–9	May 1998	Italian Open, Rome	Clay	(Spain) Albert Costa	w/o
Win	10–9	May 1998	Sankt Pölten Open, Austria (2)	Clay	(United States) Vincent Spadea	6–2, 6–0
Win	11–9	Oct 1998	Grand Slam Cup, Munich	Hard (i)	(United States) Andre Agassi	6–4, 2–6, 7–6^{(7–1)}, 5–7, 6–3
Win	12–9	Oct 1998	Singapore Open	Hard	(Australia) Mark Woodforde	6–4, 6–2
Loss	12–10	Apr 1999	Monte-Carlo Masters, Monaco	Clay	(Brazil) Gustavo Kuerten	4–6, 1–2 ret.
Win	13–10	May 1999	Hamburg Masters, Germany	Clay	(Argentina) Mariano Zabaleta	6–7^{(5–7)}, 7–5, 5–7, 7–6^{(7–5)}, 6–2
Win	14–10	May 1999	Sankt Pölten Open, Austria (3)	Clay	(Argentina) Mariano Zabaleta	4–4 ret.
Loss	14–11	Oct 1999	Shanghai Open, China	Hard	(Sweden) Magnus Norman	6–2, 3–6, 5–7
Win	15–11	Oct 1999	Singapore Open (2)	Hard	(Sweden) Mikael Tillström	6–2, 7–6^{(7–5)}
Win	16–11	Jul 2000	Croatia Open, Umag	Clay	(Argentina) Mariano Puerta	7–6^{(7–1)}, 4–6, 6–3
Win	17–11	Jan 2001	Qatar Open, Doha	Hard	(Czech Republic) Bohdan Ulihrach	6–3, 2–6, 6–3
Win	18–11	Sep 2001	Hong Kong Open, China	Hard	(Germany) Rainer Schüttler	7–6^{(7–3)}, 6–2
Loss	18–12	Oct 2002	Stockholm Open, Sweden	Hard (i)	(Thailand) Paradorn Srichaphan	7–6^{(7–2)}, 0–6, 3–6, 2–6
Loss	18–13	Feb 2003	Chile Open, Viña del Mar	Clay	(Spain) David Sánchez	6–1, 3–6, 3–6

=== Doubles: 2 (1 title / 1 runner-up) ===
Result	Date	Tournament	Surface	Partner	Opponents	Score
Win	Jul 1995	Dutch Open, Netherlands	Clay	(Netherlands) Sjeng Schalken	(Australia) Wayne Arthurs (Australia) Neil Broad	7–6, 6–2
Loss	Mar 2001	Tennis Channel Open, US	Hard	(Netherlands) Sjeng Schalken	(United States) Donald Johnson (United Kingdom) Jared Palmer	6–7^{(3–7)}, 2–6

=== Team competitions (1 title) ===
Result	Date	Tournament	Surface	Partners	Opponents	Score
Win	May 2003	World Team Cup, Düsseldorf	Clay	(Chile) Fernando González (Chile) Nicolás Massú	(Czech Republic) Jiří Novák (Czech Republic) Radek Štěpánek	2–1

Result	Date	Championship	Surface	Opponent	Score
Loss	Aug 2003	Pan American Games, Santo Domingo	Hard	(Brazil) Fernando Meligeni	7–5, 6–7^{(6–8)}, 6–7^{(5–7)}

Result	Date	Championship	Surface	Partner	Opponents	Score
Loss	Aug 2003	Pan American Games, Santo Domingo	Hard	(Chile) Adrián García	(Mexico) Santiago González (Mexico) Alejandro Hernández	7–6^{(7–5)}, 2–6, 3–6

== Singles performance timeline ==
Key
W	F	SF	QF	#R	RR	Q#	P#	DNQ	A	Z#	PO	G	S	B	NMS	NTI	P	NH

(W) winner; (F) finalist; (SF) semifinalist; (QF) quarterfinalist; (#R) rounds 4, 3, 2, 1; (RR) round-robin stage; (Q#) qualification round; (P#) preliminary round; (DNQ) did not qualify; (A) absent; (Z#) Davis/Fed Cup Zonal Group (with number indication) or (PO) play-off; (G) gold, (S) silver or (B) bronze Olympic/Paralympic medal; (NMS) not a Masters tournament; (NTI) not a Tier I tournament; (P) postponed; (NH) not held; (SR) strike rate (events won / competed); (W–L) win–loss record.

Davis Cup matches are included in the statistics. Walkovers are neither official wins nor official losses.

Tournament	1993	1994	1995	1996	1997	1998	1999	2000	2001	2002	2003	2004	SR	W–L
Grand Slam tournaments
Australian Open	A	A	A	1R	QF	F	A	A	1R	QF	A	A	0 / 5	14–5
French Open	A	2R	2R	4R	4R	QF	QF	1R	2R	A	1R	A	0 / 9	17–9
Wimbledon	A	A	1R	A	4R	1R	A	A	A	A	A	A	0 / 3	3–3
US Open	A	2R	1R	2R	QF	3R	4R	3R	3R	3R	A	A	0 / 9	17–9
Win–loss		2–2	1–3	4–3	14–4	12–4	7–2	2–2	3–3	6–2	0–1	0–0	0 / 26	51–26
Year-end championships
Tennis Masters Cup	Did not qualify					RR^{1}	Did not qualify						0 / 1	0–1
Grand Slam Cup	Did not qualify				QF	W	A	Not Held					1 / 2	4–1
ATP Masters Series
Indian Wells Masters	A	A	3R	SF	2R	W	3R	2R	1R	3R	2R	A	1 / 9	16–8
Miami Open	A	A	3R	3R	3R	W	4R	4R	2R	SF	4R	A	1 / 9	20–7
Monte-Carlo Masters	A	A	Q2	SF	W	A	F	1R	2R^{3}	3R	A	A	1 / 6	16–4
Italian Open	A	A	2R	QF	F	W	1R	1R	2R	A	A	A	1 / 7	15–6
German Open	A	A	A	SF	3R	2R	W	SF	2R	A	A	A	1 / 6	14–5
Canadian Open	A	A	A	SF	A	A	A	3R	A	3R	A	A	0 / 3	7–3
Cincinnati Masters	A	A	1R	A	3R	2R	A	2R	A	2R	A	A	0 / 5	4–5
Stuttgart Masters (Note: Held as Stuttgart Masters from 1996 to 2001, held as Madrid Masters from 2002 onwards.)	A	A	A	QF	QF	QF^{2}	QF	A	3R	2R	A	A	0 / 7	11–5
Paris Masters	A	A	A	2R	2R	QF	2R	A	A	1R	A	A	0 / 5	2–5
Win–loss		0–0	5–4	20–8	16–7	20–3	14–6	10–7	5–5	12–7	3–1	0–0	5 / 56	105–48
National Representation
Summer Olympics	Not Held			A	Not Held			1R	Not Held			A	0 / 1	0–1
Davis Cup	Z1	A	Z1	Z1	PO	Z1	PO	PO	PO	Z1	Z1	A	0 / 10	25–10
Career statistics
Finals	0	0	4	4	5	8	5	1	2	1	1	0	31	
Titles	0	0	3	1	1	7	3	1	2	0	0	0	18	
Overall win–loss	0–1	12–11	41–21	57–25	60–26	68–17	47–18	29–23	31–19	32–21	14–10	0–0	391–192	
Win %	0%	52%	66%	70%	70%	80%	72%	56%	62%	60%	58%	–	67.07%	
Year-end ranking	562	107	25	11	10	2	9	37	39	24	105	842	$9,567,686	

^{1}At the 1998 ATP Tour World Championships (Tennis Masters Cup), Ríos withdrew at round robin stage after playing the first match. He was replaced by then world No. 11 Greg Rusedski.

^{2}At the 1998 Eurocard Open (Stuttgart Masters), Ríos withdrew prior to quarterfinals.

^{3}At the 2001 Monte Carlo Masters, Ríos withdrew prior to second round.

== Top 10 wins ==
Season	1993	1994	1995	1996	1997	1998	1999	2000	2001	2002	2003	2004	Total
Wins	0	0	0	5	5	4	2	0	4	1	1	0	22

#	Player	Rank	Event	Surface	Rd	Score	Ríos Rank
1996
1.	Wayne Ferreira	10	Indian Wells, United States	Hard	QF	7–5, 7–5	20
2.	Jim Courier	9	Barcelona, Spain	Clay	SF	7–6^{(7–5)}, 4–6, 7–6^{(7–5)}	16
3.	Boris Becker	5	Monte-Carlo, Monaco	Clay	3R	6–4, 6–3	13
4.	Wayne Ferreira	10	Hamburg, Germany	Clay	QF	3–6, 6–4, 6–4	11
5.	Richard Krajicek	7	Stuttgart, Germany	Carpet (i)	3R	6–4, 6–4	10
1997
6.	Thomas Enqvist	9	Australian Open, Melbourne	Hard	4R	4–6, 6–4, 7–6^{(7–4)}, 6–7^{(5–7)}, 6–3	11
7.	Albert Costa	9	Monte-Carlo, Monaco	Clay	3R	7–6^{(7–3)}, 6–4	10
8.	Carlos Moyà	8	Monte-Carlo, Monaco	Clay	QF	6–4, 7–6^{(7–5)}	10
9.	Sergi Bruguera	8	US Open, New York	Hard	4R	7–5, 6–2, 6–4	10
10.	Yevgeny Kafelnikov	6	Stuttgart, Germany	Carpet (i)	3R	7–6^{(8–6)}, 6–3	10
1998
11.	Petr Korda	2	Indian Wells, United States	Hard	QF	6–4, 6–2	7
12.	Greg Rusedski	6	Indian Wells, United States	Hard	F	6–3, 6–7^{(15–17)}, 7–6^{(7–4)}, 6–4	7
13.	Gustavo Kuerten	9	Rome, Italy	Clay	SF	6–0, 7–5	3
14.	Andre Agassi	8	Grand Slam Cup, Munich	Hard (i)	F	6–4, 2–6, 7–6^{(7–1)}, 5–7, 6–3	3
1999
15.	Mark Philippoussis	8	Monte-Carlo, Monaco	Clay	QF	6–2, 6–7^{(2–7)}, 6–4	13
16.	Carlos Moyà	6	Hamburg, Germany	Clay	SF	6–4, 7–6^{(7–4)}	8
2001
17.	Àlex Corretja	10	Washington D.C., United States	Hard	3R	7–6^{(7–2)}, 6–3	64
18.	Sébastien Grosjean	9	Hong Kong, China (S.A.R.)	Hard	QF	6–2, 6–3	58
19.	Marat Safin	7	Stuttgart, Germany	Hard (i)	2R	7–6^{(7–4)}, 6–3	46
20.	Sébastien Grosjean	8	Stockholm, Sweden	Hard (i)	2R	6–3, 6–4	44
2002
21.	Yevgeny Kafelnikov	4	Miami, United States	Hard	3R	6–4, 7–6^{(7–4)}	33
2003
22.	Juan Carlos Ferrero	3	Miami, United States	Hard	3R	6–3, 7–6^{(7–2)}	31

== ATP Tour career earnings ==
Year	Majors	ATP wins	Total wins	Earnings ($)	Money list rank
1994	0	0	0		
1995	0	3	3		
1996	0	1	1		
1997	0	1	1	$1,397,445	12
1998	0	6	7	$3,420,054	2
1999	0	3	3	$1,794,244	5
2000	0	1	1	$493,816	40
2001	0	2	2	$466,025	43
2002	0	0	0	$506,160	39
2003	0	0	0	$308,140	73
2004	0	0	0		
Career	0	17	18	$9,713,771	

== Records ==
- Ríos has the record for being the only player in history to have been world No. 1 as a junior, as a professional and as a senior
- He was the first Latin American to reach the world No. 1 ranking, first achieved on 30 March 1998
- He was the first player to win all three clay-court ATP Masters Series since the format started in 1990
- He is the only ATP-ranked No. 1 player not to win a Grand Slam title

== Notes ==
Preceded by Pete Sampras; Pete Sampras	World No. 1; 30 March 1998 – 26 April 1998; 10 August 1998 – 23 August 1998	Succeeded by Pete Sampras; Pete Sampras
Preceded by Goran Ivanišević	ATP Champions Tour; Year-End No.1; 2006	Succeeded by Sergi Bruguera
