= Tennis at the 2003 Pan American Games – Men's singles =

Men's singles
- Tennis at the 2003 Pan American Games

Final
- Champion: Fernando Meligeni (BRA)
- Runner-up: Marcelo Ríos (CHI)
- Score: 5–7, 7–6^{(8–6)}, 7–6^{(7–5)}

Events
Singles	men	women
Doubles	men	women
- Pan American Games

The men's singles event at the 2003 Pan American Games was held at Centro Nacional de Tenis in Santo Domingo Este from August 4 to August 10.

Fernando Meligeni won the gold medal by defeating Marcelo Ríos in the final, 5–7, 7–6^{(8–6)}, 7–6^{(7–5)}. It was the final match of Meligeni's career. The Bronze medal was awarded to both semifinalists.

== Medalists ==
Gold	Fernando Meligeni; Brazil
Silver	Marcelo Ríos; Chile
Bronze	Alex Kim; United States
Bronze	José de Armas; Venezuela

== Seeds ==
1. Marcelo Ríos (CHI) (final, silver medalist)
2. Alex Bogomolov Jr. (USA) (quarterfinals)
3. Fernando Meligeni (BRA) (champion, gold medalist)
4. Alex Kim (USA) (semifinals, bronze medalist)
5. Jeff Morrison (USA) (quarterfinals)
6. Cristian Villagrán (ARG) (second round)
7. Miguel Gallardo (MEX) (quarterfinals)
8. José de Armas (VEN) (semifinals, bronze medalist)

== Draw ==
Key

- Q = Qualifier
- WC = Wild card
- LL = Lucky loser
- Alt = Alternate
- ITF = ITF entry
- PR = Protected ranking
- SR = Special ranking
- SE = Special exempt
- JE = Junior exempt
- JR = Junior Accelerator Programme entrant
- CO = College Accelerator Programme entrant
- NG = Next Gen Accelerator Program entrant
- w/o = Walkover
- r = Retired
- d = Defaulted

=== Finals ===
Quarterfinals
1	Marcelo Ríos (CHI)	7^{7}	6
7	Miguel Gallardo (MEX)	6^{1}	1
4	Alex Kim (USA)	6	7
Jhonson García (DOM)	3	5
3	Fernando Meligeni (BRA)	6	6
5	Jeff Morrison (USA)	3	4
8	José de Armas (VEN)	2	6	6
2	Alex Bogomolov Jr. (USA)	6	2	3

Semifinals
1	Marcelo Ríos (CHI)	7^{11}	7^{7}
4	Alex Kim (USA)	6^{9}	6^{4}
3	Fernando Meligeni (BRA)	6	6
8	José de Armas (VEN)	4	2

Final (gold-medal match)
1	Marcelo Ríos (CHI)	7	6^{6}	6^{5}
3	Fernando Meligeni (BRA)	5	7^{8}	7^{7}

=== Top half ===
==== Section 1 ====
First round
Shane Stone (TTO)	6	6
Gerold Gellizeaux (VIN)	0	0
José Bernard (DOM)	4
B Dabul (ARG)	6	r
P Carvallo (PAR)	2	3
L Navarro-Batles (CUB)	6	6
Karlvin Norris (DMA)	0	0
D Brown (JAM)	6	6

Second round
1	M Ríos (CHI)	6	6
S Stone (TTO)	2	2
J Bernard (DOM)	6	3	2
Jaime Cuellar (ESA)	4	6	6
K Orellana (VEN)	6	6
L Navarro-Batles (CUB)	1	2
D Brown (JAM)	4	4
7	M Gallardo (MEX)	6	6

Third round
1	M Ríos (CHI)	6	6
J Cuellar (ESA)	0	3
K Orellana (VEN)	6	3	4
7	M Gallardo (MEX)	4	6	6

Quarterfinals
1	M Ríos (CHI)	7^{7}	6
7	M Gallardo (MEX)	6^{1}	1

==== Section 2 ====
First round
Gilbero Alvarez (PUR)	2	4
M Carlsson (BRA)	6	6
Damien Applewhaite (BAR)	2	2
Kenny Callendar (ISV)	6	6
A Hernández (MEX)	6	6
D Camacho (BOL)	2	2
J García (DOM)	6	6
M Vilarrubí (URU)	4	4

Second round
4	A Kim (USA)	6	6
L Morejón (ECU)	3	2
M Carlsson (BRA)	6	6
Kenny Callendar (ISV)	1	0
M Quintero (COL)	6	3	6
A Hernández (MEX)	3	6	4
J García (DOM)	7^{7}	7
6	C Villagrán (ARG)	6^{0}	5

Third round
4	A Kim (USA)	6	6
M Carlsson (BRA)	2	2
M Quintero (COL)	2	1
J García (DOM)	6	6

Quarterfinals
4	A Kim (USA)	6	7
J García (DOM)	3	5

=== Bottom half ===
==== Section 3 ====
First round
C Berlocq (ARG)	5	7^{7}	6
R Mena (PAR)	7	6^{5}	2
G Montilla (PUR)	6	6
Damar Johnson (JAM)	2	2
R Arévalo (ESA)	0	1
A García (CHI)	6	6
C Avellán (ECU)	4	4
J Medina (VEN)	6	6

Second round
3	F Meligeni (BRA)	6	6
C Berlocq (ARG)	2	2
G Montilla (PUR)	2	6	6
Alberto Sottocorno (BOL)	6	3	4
John Richards (ISV)	1	0
A García (CHI)	6	6
J Medina (VEN)	2	6
5	J Morrison (USA)	6	7

Third round
3	F Meligeni (BRA)	w/o
G Montilla (PUR)
A García (CHI)	3	5
5	J Morrison (USA)	6	7

Quarterfinals
3	F Meligeni (BRA)	6	6
5	J Morrison (USA)	3	4

==== Section 4 ====
First round
Duane Williams (BAR)	6	6
Corey Huggins (VIN)	0	0
Jeremiah James (DMA)	0	0
M Felder (URU)	6	6
S González (MEX)	6	3	6
A Nisker (CAN)	4	6	4
R Chile (CUB)	3	4
V Estrella Burgos (DOM)	6	6

Second round
8	J de Armas (VEN)	6	6
D Williams (BAR)	2	4
M Felder (URU)	6	6
Troy Stone (TTO)	0	0
Pablo González (COL)	2	6	6
S González (MEX)	6	1	3
V Estrella Burgos (DOM)	4	6	3
2	A Bogomolov Jr. (USA)	6	2	6

Third round
8	J de Armas (VEN)	6	6
M Felder (URU)	0	2
P González (COL)	6^{5}	4
2	A Bogomolov Jr. (USA)	7^{7}	6

Quarterfinals
8	J de Armas (VEN)	2	6	6
2	A Bogomolov Jr. (USA)	6	2	3
