= Bahamas Lawn Tennis Association =

Governing body for tennis in the Bahamas

- Formation: 1961; 65 years ago
- Headquarters: Nassau, Bahamas
- President: Perry E Newton
- Website: www.blta.net

The Bahamas Lawn Tennis Association (BLTA) is the governing body for tennis in the Bahamas.

== History ==
The Bahamas Lawn Tennis Association (BLTA) is a non-profit organization and is the governing body for tennis in the Bahamas. Its mission is to lead the growth and promotion of the sport of tennis throughout the islands of the Bahamas. The BLTA is a member of the International Tennis Federation as well as the regional governing body Central American and Caribbean Tennis Confederation (COTECC).

== Bahamas Sports Hall of Fame - Tennis Inductees ==
Name	Sport	Year Inducted
John Antonas	Tennis	2011
J. Barrie Farrington	Tennis	2013
Edith Powell	Tennis	2014
Kim O'kelley	Tennis	2015
Vicky Knowles-Andrews	Tennis	2016
Leo L. Rolle	Tennis	2017
Cornell Mickey Williams	Tennis	2018
Hartie Johnson	Tennis	2021
Mark Knowles	Tennis	2023

== Presidents ==
Name	Presidency
Kendal Isaacs	1961-1966
H.P 'Junior' Urich	1966-1968
Gerald Cash	1968-1969
Graham Barry	1969-1974
J. Barrie Farrington	1974-1976
Steve Norton	1976-1977
Charles Donaldson	1977-1978
Vicky Knowles	1978-1981
Bertram Knowles	1981-1985
Peter Philips	1985-1986
Philip Russell	1986-1986
J. Barrie Farrington	1986-1992
Mickey Williams	1992-1995
Christopher 'Kit' Spencer	1995-1999
Edith Powell	1999-2002
Harold Watson	2002-2004
Mary Shelley	2004-2006
Giorgio Baldacci	2006-2007
Wesley Rolle	2007-2009
Stephen Turnquest	2009-2012
Derron Donaldson	2012-2014
Elwood Donaldson	2014-2018
Darnette Weir	2018-2020
Perry E Newton	2020-present

== Affiliations ==
- International Tennis Federation (ITF)
- Central American and Caribbean (COTECC)
- Bahamas Olympic Committee
