= Tennis at the 2003 Pan American Games – Women's doubles =

Women's doubles
- Tennis at the 2003 Pan American Games

Final
- Champions: Bruna Colósio (BRA); Joana Cortez (BRA)
- Runners-up: Kristina Brandi (PUR); Vilmarie Castellvi (PUR)
- Score: 6–4, 7–5

Events
Singles	men	women
Doubles	men	women
- Pan American Games

The women's doubles event at the 2003 Pan American Games was held at Centro Nacional de Tenis in Santo Domingo Este from August 6 to August 9.

Brazilians Bruna Colósio and Joana Cortez won the gold medal by defeating the Puerto Rican pair of Kristina Brandi and Vilmarie Castellvi in the final, 6–4, 7–5. The Bronze medal was awarded to both semifinalists.

== Medalists ==
Gold	Bruna Colósio (BRA) / Joana Cortez (BRA); Brazil
Silver	Kristina Brandi (PUR) / Vilmarie Castellvi (PUR); Puerto Rico
Bronze	Karin Palme (MEX) / Melissa Torres Sandoval (MEX); Mexico
Bronze	Yamile Fors Guerra (CUB) / Yanet Núñez Mojarena (CUB); Cuba

== Seeds ==
1. Carly Gullickson (USA) / Ansley Cargill (USA) (quarterfinals)

2. Bruna Colósio (BRA) / Joana Cortez (BRA) (champion, gold medalist)

3. Karin Palme (MEX) / Melissa Torres Sandoval (MEX) (semifinalist, bronze medalist)

4. Jorgelina Cravero (ARG) / Vanina García Sokol (ARG) (quarterfinals)

== Draw ==
Key

- Q = Qualifier
- WC = Wild card
- LL = Lucky loser
- Alt = Alternate
- ITF = ITF entry
- PR = Protected ranking
- SR = Special ranking
- SE = Special exempt
- JE = Junior exempt
- JR = Junior Accelerator Programme entrant
- CO = College Accelerator Programme entrant
- NG = Next Gen Accelerator Program entrant
- w/o = Walkover
- r = Retired
- d = Defaulted

First round
Y Fors Guerra (CUB); Y Nuñez Mojarena (CUB)	6	6
D Álvarez (BOL); Mónica Hoz De Vila (BOL)	4	2
L Cruz (ESA); M Rodezno (ESA)	6	6
Natalia Baez (DOM); G Cepeda (DOM)	3	1

Quarterfinals
1	C Gullickson (USA); A Cargill (USA)	3	2
K Brandi (PUR); V Castellvi (PUR)	6	6
4	J Cravero (ARG); V García Sokol (ARG)	2	2
Y Fors Guerra (CUB); Y Nuñez Mojarena (CUB)	6	6
3	K Palme (MEX); M Torres Sandoval (MEX)	6	6
L Cruz (ESA); M Rodezno (ESA)	2	4
2	B Colósio (BRA); J Cortez (BRA)	6	6
Richele LeSaldo (BAR); Ariana Marshall (BAR)	1	1

Semifinals
K Brandi (PUR); V Castellvi (PUR)	(Note: The score of this match is unknown.)
Y Fors Guerra (CUB); Y Nuñez Mojarena (CUB)
3	K Palme (MEX); M Torres Sandoval (MEX)	5	2
2	B Colósio (BRA); J Cortez (BRA)	7	6

Final
K Brandi (PUR); V Castellvi (PUR)	4	5
2	B Colósio (BRA); J Cortez (BRA)	6	7
