= 1998 Compaq Grand Slam Cup – Women's singles =

Women's singles
- 1998 Compaq Grand Slam Cup

Final
- Champion: (United States) Venus Williams
- Runner-up: (Switzerland) Patty Schnyder
- Score: 6–2, 3–6, 6–2

Details
- Draw: 8
- Seeds: 4

Events
Singles	men	women
Doubles	men	women
← 1997 ·	Compaq Grand Slam Cup	· 1999 →

Venus Williams won in the final 6–2, 3–6, 6–2 against Patty Schnyder.

== Seeds ==
Champion seeds are indicated in bold text while text in italics indicates the round in which those seeds were eliminated.

1. (Switzerland) Martina Hingis (semifinals)
2. (United States) Lindsay Davenport (first round)
3. (Spain) Arantxa Sánchez-Vicario (first round)
4. (Czech Republic) Jana Novotná (first round)

== Draw ==
Key

- Q = Qualifier
- WC = Wild card
- LL = Lucky loser
- Alt = Alternate
- ITF = ITF entry
- PR = Protected ranking
- SR = Special ranking
- SE = Special exempt
- JE = Junior exempt
- JR = Junior Accelerator Programme entrant
- CO = College Accelerator Programme entrant
- NG = Next Gen Accelerator Program entrant
- w/o = Walkover
- r = Retired
- d = Defaulted

=== Finals ===
First round
1	(Switzerland) **Martina Hingis**	**6**	**7**
(Spain) Conchita Martínez	2	5
4	(Czech Republic) Jana Novotná	**6**	5	5
Alt	(Switzerland) **Patty Schnyder**	2	**7**	**7**
(United States) **Venus Williams**	**6**	**6**
3	(Spain) Arantxa Sánchez-Vicario	3	2
(France) **Nathalie Tauziat**	4	**6**	**7**
2	(United States) Lindsay Davenport	**6**	1	5

Semifinals
1	(Switzerland) Martina Hingis	5	**7**	5/r
Alt	(Switzerland) **Patty Schnyder**	**7**	5	**5**
(United States) **Venus Williams**	**6**	**6**
(France) Nathalie Tauziat	4	0

Final
Alt	(Switzerland) Patty Schnyder	2	**6**	2
(United States) **Venus Williams**	**6**	3	**6**
