= 1998 Compaq Grand Slam Cup – Men's singles =

Men's singles
- 1998 Compaq Grand Slam Cup

Final
- Champion: (Chile) Marcelo Ríos
- Runner-up: (United States) Andre Agassi
- Score: 6–4, 2–6, 7–6^{(7–1)}, 5–7, 6–3

Events
Singles	men	women
Doubles	men	women
← 1997 ·	Grand Slam Cup	· 1999 →

Marcelo Ríos won in the final 6–4, 2–6, 7–6^{(7–1)}, 5–7, 6–3 against Andre Agassi. It was Ríos' 6th title of the year and the 11th of his career.

== Seeds ==
Champion seeds are indicated in bold text while text in italics indicates the round in which those seeds were eliminated.

1. (Czech Republic) Petr Korda (quarterfinals)
2. (Chile) **Marcelo Ríos (champion)**
3. (Australia) Mark Philippoussis (semifinals)
4. (Croatia) Goran Ivanišević (quarterfinals)

== Draw ==
=== Key ===
- Q = Qualifier
- WC = Wild card
- LL = Lucky loser
- Alt = Alternate
- SE = Special exempt
- PR = Protected ranking
- ITF = ITF entry
- JE = Junior exempt
- w/o = Walkover
- r = Retired
- d = Defaulted
- SR = Special ranking

=== Finals ===
First round
(France) Cédric Pioline	0	0
WC	(United States) **Andre Agassi**	**6**	**6**
(Slovakia) **Karol Kučera**	**6**	**6**
Alt	(Morocco) Hicham Arazi	4	4
(United Kingdom) Tim Henman	5	3
Alt	(Sweden) **Jonas Björkman**	**7**	**6**
Alt	(France) Nicolas Escudé	3	3
Alt	(Spain) **Félix Mantilla**	**6**	**6**

Quarterfinals
1	(Czech Republic) Petr Korda	**6**	0	1
WC	(United States) **Andre Agassi**	4	**6**	**6**
4	(Croatia) Goran Ivanišević	**7**	4	6
(Slovakia) **Karol Kučera**	5	**6**	**8**
Alt	(Sweden) Jonas Björkman	**6**	6^{1}	1
3	(Australia) **Mark Philippoussis**	4	**7^{7}**	**6**
Alt	(Spain) Félix Mantilla	6^{2}	5
2	(Chile) **Marcelo Ríos**	**7^{7}**	**7**

Semifinals
WC	(United States) **Andre Agassi**	**7^{7}**	6^{5}	2	**7**	**6**
(Slovakia) Karol Kučera	6^{1}	**7^{7}**	**6**	5	0
3	(Australia) Mark Philippoussis	6^{4}	3	4
2	(Chile) **Marcelo Ríos**	**7^{7}**	**6**	**6**

Final
WC	(United States) Andre Agassi	4	**6**	6^{1}	**7**	3
2	(Chile) **Marcelo Ríos**	**6**	2	**7^{7}**	5	**6**
