= Fernando Meligeni =

Brazilian tennis player

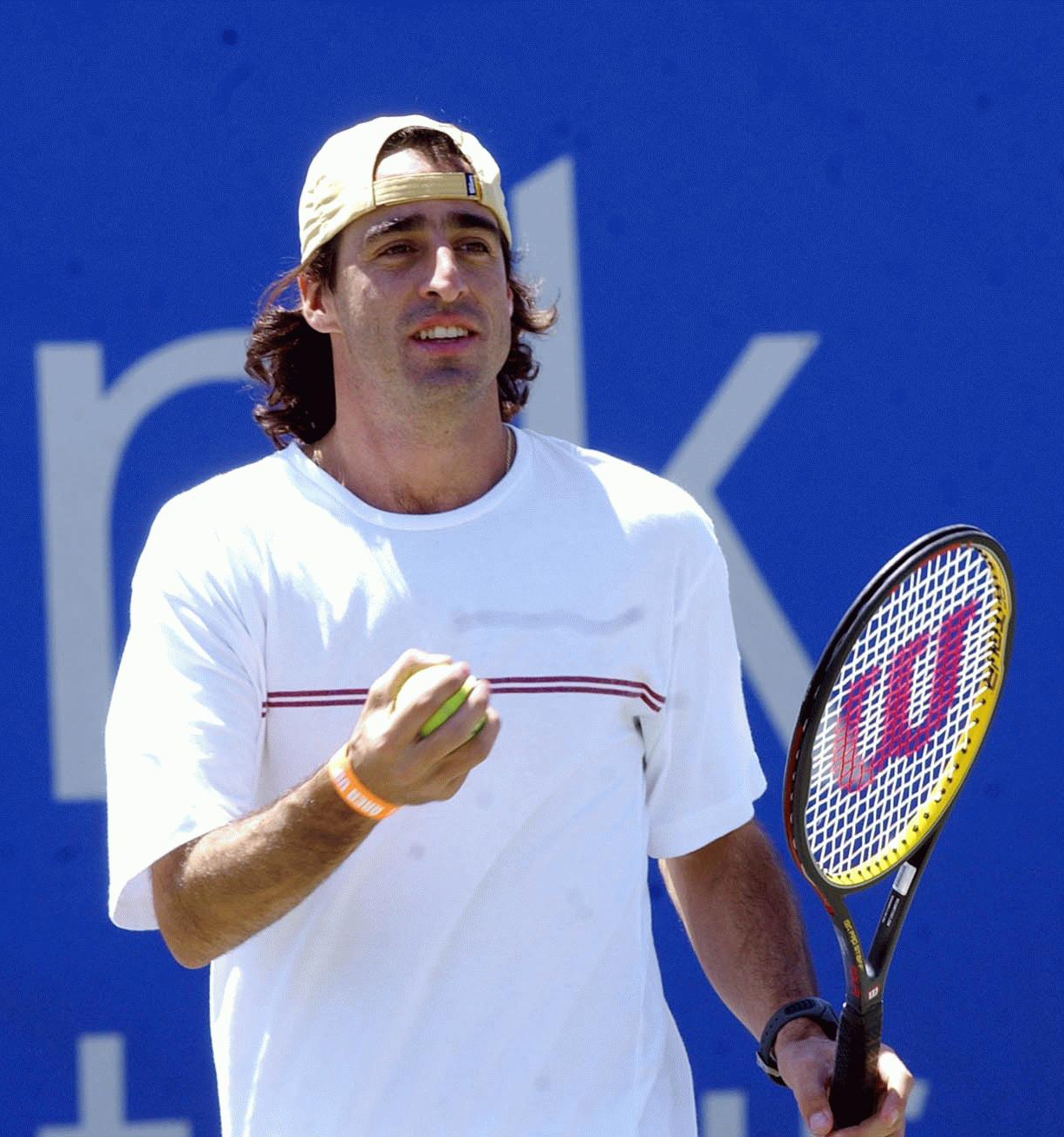
- Meligeni in 2003
- Full name: Fernando Ariel Meligeni
- Country (sports): Brazil
- Residence: São Paulo, Brazil
- Born: 12 April 1971 (age 55) Buenos Aires, Argentina
- Height: 1.80 m (5 ft 11 in)
- Turned pro: 1990
- Retired: 2003
- Plays: Left-handed (one-handed backhand)
- Prize money: $2,555,367

Singles
- Career record: 202–217
- Career titles: 3
- Highest ranking: No. 25 (11 October 1999)

Grand Slam singles results
- Australian Open: 2R (1997)
- French Open: SF (1999)
- Wimbledon: 2R (2001)
- US Open: 3R (1997)

Other tournaments
- Grand Slam Cup: 1R (1999)
- Olympic Games: SF – 4th (1996)

Doubles
- Career record: 63–64
- Career titles: 7
- Highest ranking: No. 34 (3 November 1997)

Grand Slam doubles results
- Australian Open: 2R (2003)
- French Open: QF (1998)
- US Open: 1R (1997, 1998)

Team competitions
- Davis Cup: SF (2000)
Medal record
Pan American Games
Gold medal – first place	2003 Santo Domingo	Men's Singles

Fernando Ariel Meligeni (born 12 April 1971), nicknamed Fininho (diminutive form in Portuguese for thin), is a Brazilian former professional tennis player. He won three singles (and 7 doubles) titles and reached the semifinals of both the 1999 French Open and the 1996 Summer Olympics. In the last match of his career, he won the gold medal in men's singles at the 2003 Pan American Games, defeating former world No. 1 Marcelo Rios in the final. Meligeni was known for taking matches to the limit, sometimes winning in tiebreaks and five sets, and his favorite surface was clay.

== Personal life ==
Meligeni was born in Buenos Aires, Argentina but moved with his family to São Paulo, Brazil, when he was four years old. He is of Italian descent. He has a younger sister, Paula, the mother of two tennis players, Felipe and Carolina Meligeni Alves. He applied to get Brazilian citizenship as a teenager, and took him five years to complete the process. He is married to actress Carol Hubner, with whom he has two children.

== Tennis career ==
=== Juniors ===
As a junior, he won the traditional Orange Bowl in 1989, finishing No. 3 in the world junior rankings in the same year.

=== Pro tour ===
Meligeni turned professional in 1990, opting for Brazilian nationality, although his parents and sister disagreed with this.

He won his first ATP Tour singles title in 1995, at the Swedish Open in Båstad, Sweden. In 1996, Meligeni won his second ATP Tour singles title in Pinehurst, North Carolina, defeating veteran Mats Wilander in the final.

In 1996, ranked 93rd of the ATP rankings, Meligeni was one of the 64 competitors that would directly enter the upcoming tennis tournament of the 1996 Summer Olympics in Atlanta. Withdrawals due to injuries and personal decisions gave him an alternate spot. With four wins over higher ranked players, Meligeni reached the semifinals, where he was defeated by Spain's Sergi Bruguera. In the bronze medal game, he lost to Leander Paes of India.

In 1998, Meligeni won his third and last ATP Tour singles title in Prague, Czech Republic, beating then world No. 6, Yevgeny Kafelnikov from Russia, on the way. This year Meligeni had an excellent performance at the 1998 French Open losing at 4th round but playing an incredible match of five tough sets against clay-court specialist Thomas Muster.

Meligeni reached his peak in the following year, with a strong performance at the 1999 French Open in Paris, France. He defeated Justin Gimelstob, Younes El Aynaoui as well as seeds No. 3, Patrick Rafter from Australia, No. 14, Félix Mantilla from Spain, and No. 6, Àlex Corretja also from Spain, only to fall in the semifinals to Ukrainian Andrei Medvedev. This was his best major singles result and led him to a career-high ranking of world No. 25. This year also had Meligeni's personal favorite match of his career, where he defeated Pete Sampras (ATP nº2 at the time) at the Rome Masters (6–3, 6–1). At the press conference after this match, Sampras declared "he had attended a masterclass on how to play on clay". He was also a member of the Brazilian Davis Cup team, with an overall record of 13–16, and reaching the semifinals in 2000.

In addition to his three singles titles, Meligeni also won seven doubles titles on the ATP Tour, most of them partnering countryman Gustavo Kuerten. Meligeni retired from professional tennis in 2003, playing his last match against Marcelo Ríos from Chile in the final of the 2003 Pan American Games in Santo Domingo, Dominican Republic which he won in three sets.

Two years later, he was nominated captain of the Brazilian Davis Cup team, but resigned in January 2007 due to political differences with the Brazilian Tennis Confederation. During his period as a captain, he collected a 5–1 win/loss record in ties.

Off the court, Meligeni has been a host for MTV Brasil, TV Cultura, and ESPN Brazil, in the last one and SporTV also serving as a tennis commentator.

== Career statistics ==
=== Singles performance timeline ===
Key
W	F	SF	QF	#R	RR	Q#	DNQ	A	NH

(W) winner; (F) finalist; (SF) semifinalist; (QF) quarterfinalist; (#R) rounds 4, 3, 2, 1; (RR) round-robin stage; (Q#) qualification round; (DNQ) did not qualify; (A) absent; (NH) not held; (SR) strike rate (events won / competed); (W–L) win–loss record.

Tournament	1991	1992	1993	1994	1995	1996	1997	1998	1999	2000	2001	2002	2003	SR	W–L	Win (%)
Grand Slam tournaments
Australian Open	A	A	A	1R	A	1R	2R	1R	1R	1R	A	1R	1R	0 / 8	1–8	11%
French Open	A	A	4R	1R	3R	1R	2R	4R	SF	2R	3R	2R	Q1	0 / 10	18–10	64%
Wimbledon	A	A	A	1R	A	A	A	A	A	1R	2R	1R	A	0 / 4	1–4	20%
US Open	A	1R	1R	1R	1R	1R	3R	1R	2R	1R	2R	2R	A	0 / 11	5–11	31%
Win–loss	0–0	0–1	3–2	0–4	2–2	0–3	4–3	3–3	6–3	1–4	4–3	2–4	0–1	0 / 33	25–33	43%

=== Significant finals ===
==== Olympic Games ====
Result	Year	Tournament	Surface	Opponent	Score
4th Place	1996	Atlanta Olympics	Hard	(India) Leander Paes	6–3, 2–6, 4–6

==== Pan American Games ====
Result	Year	Tournament	Surface	Opponent	Score
Gold	2003	Santo Domingo Games	Hard	(Chile) Marcelo Ríos	5–7, 7–6^{(8–6)}, 7–6^{(7–5)}

Awards
Preceded by Nalbert Bitencourt	Brazilian Sportsmen of the Year; 2003	Succeeded by Vanderlei de Lima
