= 1998 Compaq Grand Slam Cup =

- Date: 28 September – 4 October
- Edition: 9th (men) / 1st (women)
- Surface: Hard / Indoor
- Location: Olympiahalle, Munich

Champions

Men's singles
- (Chile) Marcelo Ríos

Women's singles
- (United States) Venus Williams
- Compaq Grand Slam Cup

The 1998 Compaq Grand Slam Cup was a tennis tournament played on indoor hard courts at the Olympiahalle in Munich in Germany. The event was organized by the International Tennis Federation (ITF), which invited the best-performing players in the year's Grand Slam events to compete in the Grand Slam Cup.

The tournament was held from 28 September to 4 October 1998. The prize money was significant, and therefore the most popular exhibition tournament among the players but there were no ranking points awarded since the ITF had no influence on ATP and WTA who control the ranking system. However the Grand Slam Cup-tournaments would later be recognized by the ATP as official tournaments and a tournament win would be included in the players statistics.

== Finals ==
=== Men's singles ===
(Chile) Marcelo Ríos defeated (United States) Andre Agassi 6–4, 2–6, 7–6^{(7–1)}, 5–7, 6–3

- It was Ríos' 6th title of the year and the 11th of his career.

=== Women's singles ===
(United States) Venus Williams defeated (Switzerland) Patty Schnyder 6–2, 3–6, 6–2

- It was Williams' 6th title of the year and the 6th of her career.
