= Mark Knowles =

Bahamian tennis player (born 1971)

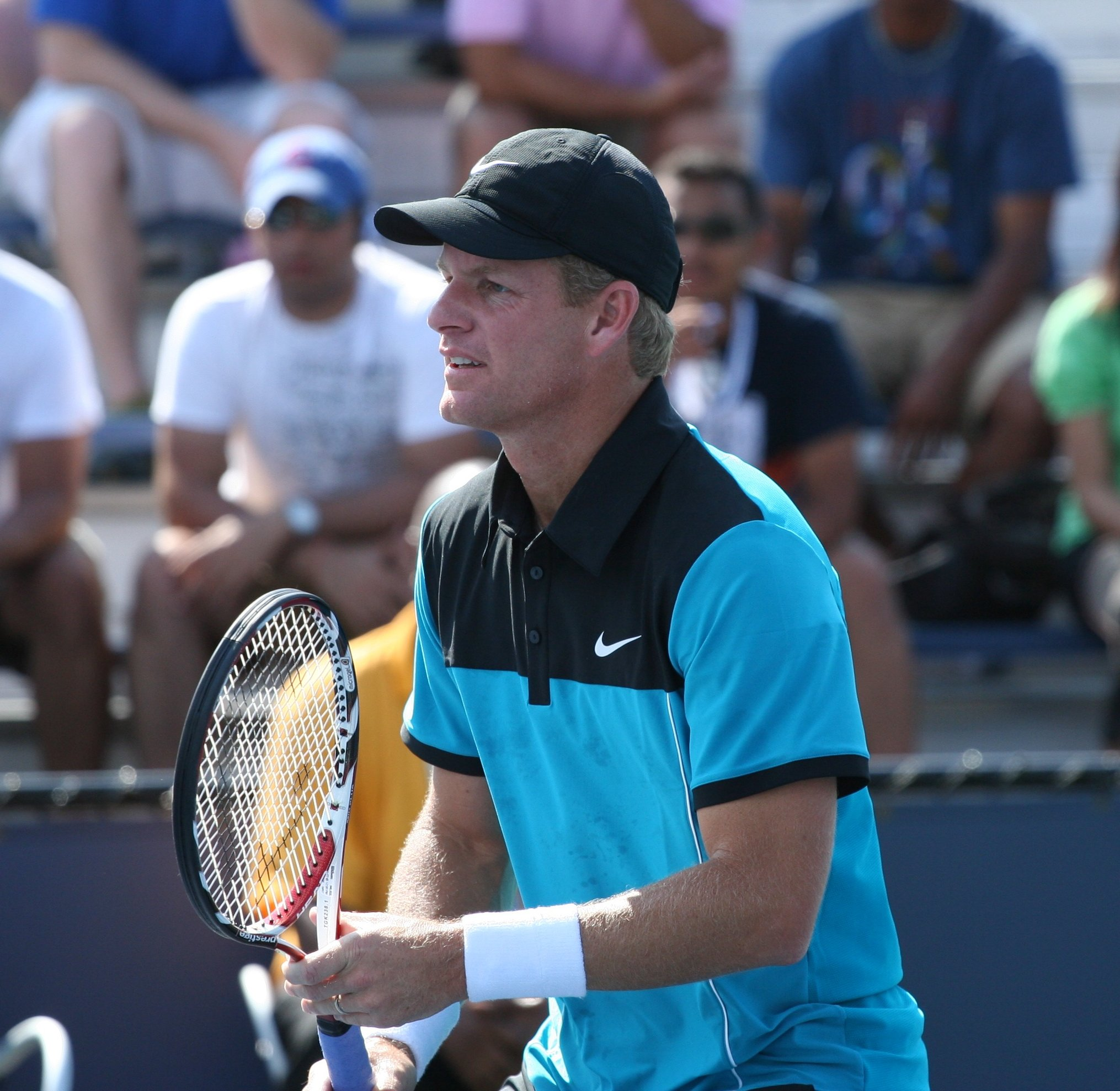
- Country (sports): Bahamas
- Residence: Nassau, Bahamas
- Born: 4 September 1971 (age 55) Nassau, Bahamas
- Height: 1.90 m (6 ft 3 in)
- Turned pro: 1992
- Retired: 2016
- Plays: Right-handed (one-handed backhand)
- College: UCLA
- Prize money: US$ 7,049,710

Singles
- Career record: 46–77
- Career titles: 0
- Highest ranking: No. 96 (24 June 1996)

Grand Slam singles results
- Australian Open: 1R (1994, 1997)
- French Open: 2R (1996)
- Wimbledon: 2R (1992, 1994, 1995, 1996)
- US Open: 2R (1996)

Other tournaments
- Olympic Games: 1R (1996)

Doubles
- Career record: 746–381
- Career titles: 55
- Highest ranking: No. 1 (24 June 2002)

Grand Slam doubles results
- Australian Open: W (2002)
- French Open: W (2007)
- Wimbledon: F (2002)
- US Open: W (2004)

Other doubles tournaments
- Tour Finals: W (2007)
- Olympic Games: QF (2000)

Mixed doubles
- Career titles: 1

Grand Slam mixed doubles results
- Wimbledon: W (2009)

Coaching career
- Mardy Fish (formerly); Milos Raonic (2017–?); Jessica Pegula (2024–)
- Last updated on: May 2025.

Mark Knowles (born 4 September 1971) is a Bahamian former professional tennis player and coach. He is a former world No. 1 in doubles. He won three of the four Grand Slam tournaments in men's doubles, partnering with Daniel Nestor of Canada, as well as Wimbledon in mixed doubles with Anna-Lena Grönefeld of Germany. At various times between 2002 and 2005 he was ranked World No. 1 in doubles. He is a five-time Olympian.

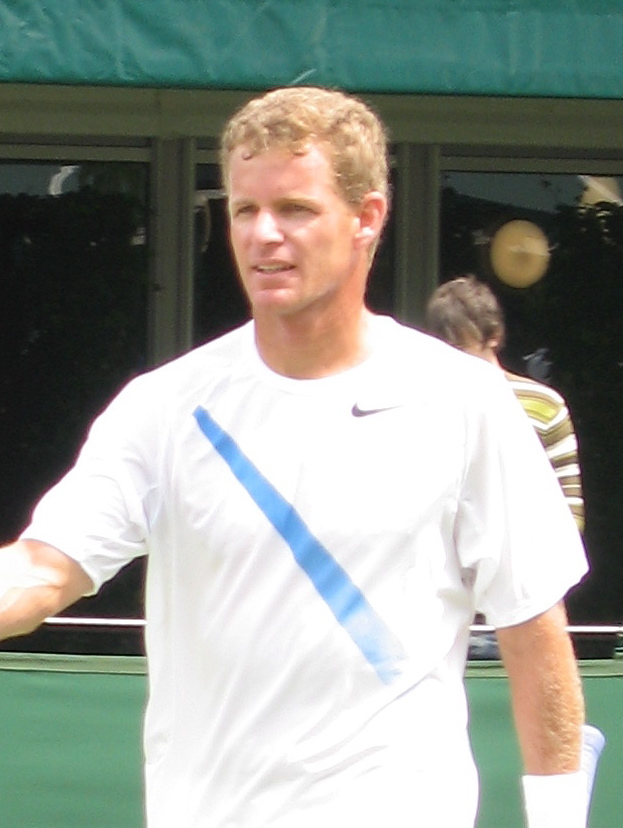
Knowles, 2007

== Early life ==
Knowles was born on 4 September 1971, the son of Samuel Knowles and Vicky Knowles-Andrews. His parents were both tennis coaches, with his English-born mother being the first female tennis pro in the Bahamas and first female president of the Bahamas Lawn Tennis Association.

Knowles played tennis from the age of three, primarily at hotel tennis courts on New Providence where his parents were coaching. He attended Xavier's Lower School in Nassau until the age of 10, when he moved to the United States to attend the Nick Bollettieri Tennis Academy on a scholarship. He trained with Nick Bollettieri for seven years. He later studied economics at the University of California, Los Angeles.

== Career ==
=== Junior and college career ===
Knowles's best junior singles performance came at the 1989 Junior US Open with a quarterfinal appearance and his best doubles performance came at the 1989 Junior French Open with a final appearance partnering Luis Herrera. He reached a career-high junior ranking of No. 12. He also played three seasons at UCLA in college tennis, where he earned All-American honours in both singles and doubles before turning pro in 1992.

=== Professional career ===
Knowles's highest ATP singles ranking was world No. 96, the highest ever ranked Bahamian in history alongside Roger Smith. He was very successful in doubles, partnering Daniel Nestor, Mahesh Bhupathi. With Nestor, Knowles won the 2002 Australian Open, the 2004 US Open and the 2007 French Open. He also won the 2009 Wimbledon Mixed doubles title with Anna-Lena Grönefeld of Germany.

On 5 July 2006, Knowles and Nestor participated in one of the longest matches in Wimbledon history. Their quarterfinal match against Sweden's Simon Aspelin and Australian Todd Perry lasted 6 hours and 9 minutes, with Knowles and Nestor eventually winning 5–7, 6–3, 6–7(5–7), 6–2, 23–21.

His 13-year partnership with Daniel Nestor ended after the 2007 US Open. After reaching the Basel final with James Blake, Knowles reunited with Nestor once again to win the 2007 Tennis Masters Cup. They defeated Simon Aspelin and Julian Knowle, 6–3, 6–2, to take their first Tennis Masters Cup title.

Knowles then played with fellow Grand Slam doubles champion Mahesh Bhupathi, for two seasons in 2008 and 2009, and the two were one of the most successful teams on tour, qualifying for the season-ending championships in both years. After losing in their season debut in Sydney, Knowles and Bhupathi knocked out defending champions Bob Bryan and Mike Bryan in the quarterfinals of the Australian Open, taking the gripping match in a final set tiebreak. The two lost to eventual champions Jonathan Erlich and Andy Ram. Other season highlights included three titles, at Memphis, Dubai and Basel. The victory in Basel gave Knowles his 50th career title.

At the 2009 Australian Open, Knowles and Bhupathi went one step further than the year before, reaching the final before losing to the Bryans in three sets, after winning the first set 6–2. They went on to reach the US Open final later that year, despite the fact that Knowles was hampered by a hand injury that required eight stitches on his dominant hand (right). They also claimed their first ATP World Tour Masters 1000 crown together, winning the Rogers Cup in Montreal. They closed out their partnership at the Barclays ATP World Tour Finals, winning their round-robin group before going down in the semifinals to the Bryans. Knowles also repeated as champion in Memphis with Mardy Fish.

In 2010, Knowles joined forces with Fish, and after both struggled with injuries the first half of the season, the two captured the Legg Mason Tennis Classic in Washington, defeating Tomáš Berdych and Radek Štěpánek in the final. The two advanced to the quarterfinals of the Western & Southern Open in Cincinnati and the third round of the US Open. Knowles finished the season on a high note with a runner-up finish at the ATP World Tour Masters 1000 event in Paris with Andy Ram. The two upset top-ranked Bob Bryan and Mike Bryan in the quarterfinals.

2011 was a tough year for the Bahamian, as his season partner, Michal Mertiňák, went down with a back injury at the French Open. Prior to that, the two made semifinal appearances in San Jose and Memphis and the quarterfinals of the BNP Paribas Open at Indian Wells. After falling in the first round of Wimbledon with Łukasz Kubot, Knowles played his 10th season of World TeamTennis with the Sacramento Capitals, and then partnered Xavier Malisse to the Farmers Classic title at his former college campus, UCLA. The two edged Somdev Devvarman and Treat Conrad Huey to give the Bahamian his 54th doubles title. Knowles and Malisse also reached the quarterfinals in Washington and the third round at the US Open.

In October, Knowles was invited to participate in the 19th annual World TeamTennis Smash Hits charity event in Cleveland, co-hosted by Sir Elton John and Billie Jean King. Knowles was selected by John as a member of his team, which went on to win the exhibition 19–18. The event raised over $500,000 for various AIDS charities.

At the 2012 SAP Open, Knowles rejoined Malisse to win the ATP World Tour 250 event in San Jose, becoming the first men's player over 40 to win a tour-level doubles title since John McEnroe.

=== Retirement ===
Knowles announced his retirement at the 2012 US Open. After his announcement, many famed players such as Jonas Björkman, Mahesh Bhupathi, and longtime partner Daniel Nestor praised him. He once again partnered Malisse but lost in the first round to Pablo Andújar and Guillermo García López in three sets. However, he played one more grand slam tournament at Wimbledon in 2013 partnering Lleyton Hewitt but lost in the first round to Jamie Delgado and Matthew Ebden in straight sets where he and opponent Delgado shared the all-time male record for playing in consecutive Wimbledon tournaments, with 22 appearances in the Open era although Delgado broke the record the next year at 2014 Wimbledon with 23 appearances. After that, he played in only one tournament per year from 2014 to 2016. The first tournament was the RBC Tennis Championships of Dallas which he played in 2014 and 2015. In 2014, he partnered Ryan Harrison and made the finals but lost to top seed Sam Groth and Chris Guccione in straight sets. In 2015, he partnered Mardy Fish and defeated top seed James Cerretani and James Cluskey in the first round but lost in the next round to Hans Hach Verdugo and Luis Patiño in straight sets. The last tournament of his career was the 2016 Irving Tennis Classic where he partnered Benjamin Becker but lost in the first round to Jason Jung and Jakob Sude in straight sets.

== Team Competitions ==
Knowles was a standout at UCLA for three years, earning All-American honors in singles and doubles before turning pro in 1991.

Representing the Bahamas, Knowles competed in five consecutive Olympic Games (1992-2008) and is his country's all-time leader in Davis Cup wins, playing in 29 ties. He received the prestigious Davis Cup Commitment Award from ITF president Francesco Ricci Bitti at the All England Club in 2014.

In World TeamTennis, Knowles was the captain of the Sacramento Capitals for 10 years, picking up three Male MVP Awards. His team won championships in 2002 and 2007.

== Post career ==
After he finished coaching Mardy Fish, Knowles went on to coach several players, including Jack Sock and Milos Raonic. As of 2021, he was not actively coaching and was running a tennis academy in the Bahamas. He also usually plays exhibitions in the Bahamas for fundraising.

Since 2013, Knowles has worked on-air for American TV Tennis Channel, providing in-match commentary, courtside interviews and tournament desk analysis.

He started coaching Jessica Pegula in 2024 together with Mark Merklein.

== Memberships ==
Knowles was elected by his peers as vice-president of the ATP and was selected to be on the ATP Drug Force Council.

== ATP career finals ==
=== Doubles: 99 (55–44) ===
Legend Grand Slam (3–8) ATP World Tour Finals (1–2) ATP World Tour Masters 1000 (17–12) ATP World Tour 500 Series (15–7) ATP World Tour 250 Series (19–15)	Titles by surface Hard (37–29) Clay (11–8) Grass (3–2) Carpet (4–5)

Result	No.	Date	Tournament	Surface	Partner	Opponents	Score
Win	1.	2 August 1993	Montréal, Canada (1)	Hard	(United States) Jim Courier	(Canada) Glenn Michibata (United States) David Pate	6–4, 7–6
Loss	1.	21 March 1994	Miami, US	Hard	(United States) Jared Palmer	(Netherlands) Jacco Eltingh (Netherlands) Paul Haarhuis	6–7, 6–7
Win	2.	19 September 1994	Bogotá, Colombia	Clay	(Canada) Daniel Nestor	(United States) Luke Jensen (United States) Murphy Jensen	6–4, 7–6
Loss	2.	30 January 1995	Melbourne, Australia	Hard	(Canada) Daniel Nestor	(United States) Jared Palmer (United States) Richey Reneberg	3–6, 6–3, 3–6, 2–6
Win	3.	17 April 1995	Tokyo, Japan	Hard	(United States) Jonathan Stark	(Australia) John Fitzgerald (Sweden) Anders Järryd	6–3, 3–6, 7–6
Loss	3.	14 August 1995	Cincinnati, US	Hard	(Canada) Daniel Nestor	(Australia) Todd Woodbridge (Australia) Mark Woodforde	2–6, 0–3, RET
Win	4.	21 August 1995	Indianapolis, US (1)	Hard	(Canada) Daniel Nestor	(United States) Scott Davis (United States) Todd Martin	6–4, 6–4
Win	5.	8 January 1996	Doha, Qatar (1)	Hard	(Canada) Daniel Nestor	(Netherlands) Jacco Eltingh (Netherlands) Paul Haarhuis	7–6, 6–3
Win	6.	5 February 1996	Shanghai, China	Carpet	(The Bahamas) Roger Smith	(United States) Jim Grabb (Australia) Michael Tebbutt	4–6, 6–2, 7–6
Win	7.	26 February 1996	Memphis, US (1)	Hard (i)	(Canada) Daniel Nestor	(Australia) Todd Woodbridge (Australia) Mark Woodforde	6–4, 7–5
Loss	4.	22 April 1996	Tokyo, Japan	Hard	(United States) Rick Leach	(Australia) Todd Woodbridge (Australia) Mark Woodforde	2–6, 3–6
Win	8.	13 May 1996	Hamburg, Germany (1)	Clay	(Canada) Daniel Nestor	(France) Guy Forget (Switzerland) Jakob Hlasek	6–2, 6–4
Win	9.	12 August 1996	Cincinnati, US (1)	Hard	(Canada) Daniel Nestor	(Australia) Sandon Stolle (Czech Republic) Cyril Suk	3–6, 6–3, 6–4
Loss	5.	26 August 1996	Toronto, Canada	Hard	(Canada) Daniel Nestor	(United States) Patrick Galbraith (Netherlands) Paul Haarhuis	6–7, 3–6
Loss	6.	17 February 1997	San Jose, US	Hard (i)	(Canada) Daniel Nestor	(United States) Brian MacPhie (South Africa) Gary Muller	6–4, 6–7, 5–7
Win	10.	17 March 1997	Indian Wells, US (1)	Hard	(Canada) Daniel Nestor	(Australia) Mark Philippoussis (Australia) Patrick Rafter	7–6, 4–6, 7–5
Loss	7.	31 March 1997	Miami, US	Hard	(Canada) Daniel Nestor	(Australia) Todd Woodbridge (Australia) Mark Woodforde	7–6, 7–6
Win	11.	19 May 1997	Rome, Italy (1)	Clay	(Canada) Daniel Nestor	(Zimbabwe) Byron Black (United States) Alex O'Brien	6–3, 4–6, 7–5
Loss	8.	8 June 1998	Paris, France	Clay	(Canada) Daniel Nestor	(Netherlands) Jacco Eltingh (Netherlands) Paul Haarhuis	3–6, 6–3, 3–6
Win	12.	17 August 1998	Cincinnati, US (2)	Hard	(Canada) Daniel Nestor	(France) Olivier Delaître (France) Fabrice Santoro	6–1, 2–1, RET
Loss	9.	24 August 1998	Indianapolis, US	Hard	(Canada) Daniel Nestor	(Czech Republic) Jiří Novák (Czech Republic) David Rikl	2–6, 6–7
Loss	10.	14 September 1998	New York, US	Hard	(Canada) Daniel Nestor	(Czech Republic) Cyril Suk (Australia) Sandon Stolle	6–4, 6–7, 2–6
Loss	11.	22 November 1998	Hartford, US	Carpet	(Canada) Daniel Nestor	(Netherlands) Jacco Eltingh (Netherlands) Paul Haarhuis	4–6, 2–6, 5–7
Loss	12.	8 March 1999	Scottsdale, US	Hard	(Australia) Sandon Stolle	(United States) Justin Gimelstob (United States) Richey Reneberg	4–6, 7–6^{(7–4)}, 3–6
Win	13.	10 January 2000	Doha, Qatar (2)	Hard	(Belarus) Max Mirnyi	(United States) Alex O'Brien (United States) Jared Palmer	6–3, 6–4
Loss	13.	17 April 2000	Atlanta, US	Clay	(United States) Justin Gimelstob	(South Africa) Ellis Ferreira (United States) Rick Leach	3–6, 4–6
Win	14.	27 November 2000	Stockholm, Sweden	Hard (i)	(Canada) Daniel Nestor	(Czech Republic) Petr Pála (Czech Republic) Pavel Vízner	6–3, 6–2
Win	15.	8 January 2001	Doha, Qatar (3)	Hard	(Canada) Daniel Nestor	(Spain) Juan Balcells (Russia) Andrei Olhovskiy	6–3, 6–1
Win	16.	5 March 2001	San Jose, US	Hard (i)	(United States) Brian MacPhie	(United States) Jan-Michael Gambill (United States) Jonathan Stark	6–3, 7–6^{(7–4)}
Win	17.	20 August 2001	Indianapolis, US (2)	Hard	(United States) Brian MacPhie	(India) Mahesh Bhupathi (Canada) Sébastien Lareau	7–6^{(7–5)}, 5–7, 6–4
Win	18.	28 January 2002	Melbourne, Australia	Hard	(Canada) Daniel Nestor	(France) Michaël Llodra (France) Fabrice Santoro	7–6^{(7–4)}, 6–3
Loss	14.	25 February 2002	Rotterdam, Netherlands	Hard (i)	(Canada) Daniel Nestor	(Switzerland) Roger Federer (Belarus) Max Mirnyi	6–4, 3–6, [4–10]
Win	19.	4 March 2002	Dubai, UAE (1)	Hard	(Canada) Daniel Nestor	(Australia) Joshua Eagle (Australia) Sandon Stolle	3–6, 6–3, [13–11]
Loss	15.	11 March 2002	Scottsdale, US	Hard	(Canada) Daniel Nestor	(United States) Bob Bryan (United States) Mike Bryan	5–7, 6–7^{(6–8)}
Win	20.	18 March 2002	Indian Wells, US (2)	Hard	(Canada) Daniel Nestor	(Switzerland) Roger Federer (Belarus) Max Mirnyi	6–4, 6–4
Win	21.	1 April 2002	Miami, US	Hard	(Canada) Daniel Nestor	(United States) Donald Johnson (United States) Jared Palmer	6–3, 3–6, 6–1
Loss	16.	10 June 2002	Paris, France	Clay	(Canada) Daniel Nestor	(Netherlands) Paul Haarhuis (Russia) Yevgeny Kafelnikov	5–7, 4–6
Win	22.	24 June 2002	Nottingham, England	Grass	(United States) Mike Bryan	(United States) Donald Johnson (United States) Jared Palmer	0–6, 7–6^{(7–3)}, 6–4
Loss	17.	8 July 2002	London, England	Grass	(Canada) Daniel Nestor	(Sweden) Jonas Björkman (Australia) Todd Woodbridge	1–6, 2–6, 7–6^{(9–7)}, 5–7
Loss	18.	5 August 2002	Toronto, Canada	Hard	(Canada) Daniel Nestor	(United States) Bob Bryan (United States) Mike Bryan	6–4, 6–7^{(1–7)}, 3–6
Win	23.	19 August 2002	Indianapolis, US (3)	Hard	(Canada) Daniel Nestor	(India) Mahesh Bhupathi (Belarus) Max Mirnyi	7–6^{(7–4)}, 6–7^{(5–7)}, 6–4
Loss	19.	14 October 2002	Lyon, France	Carpet	(Canada) Daniel Nestor	(Zimbabwe) Wayne Black (Zimbabwe) Kevin Ullyett	4–6, 6–3, 6–7^{(3–7)}
Win	24.	21 October 2002	Madrid, Spain (1)	Hard (i)	(Canada) Daniel Nestor	(India) Mahesh Bhupathi (Belarus) Max Mirnyi	6–3, 7–5, 6–0
Loss	20.	28 October 2002	Basel, Switzerland	Carpet	(Canada) Daniel Nestor	(United States) Bob Bryan (United States) Mike Bryan	6–7^{(1–7)}, 5–7
Loss	21.	6 January 2003	Doha, Qatar	Hard	(Canada) Daniel Nestor	(Czech Republic) Martin Damm (Czech Republic) Cyril Suk	4–6, 6–7^{(8–10)}
Loss	22.	27 January 2003	Melbourne, Australia	Hard	(Canada) Daniel Nestor	(France) Michaël Llodra (France) Fabrice Santoro	4–6, 6–3, 3–6
Win	25.	24 February 2003	Memphis, US (2)	Hard (i)	(Canada) Daniel Nestor	(United States) Bob Bryan (United States) Mike Bryan	6–2, 7–6^{(7–3)}
Win	26.	3 March 2003	Acapulco, Mexico	Clay	(Canada) Daniel Nestor	(Spain) David Ferrer (Spain) Fernando Vicente	6–3, 6–3
Win	27.	28 April 2003	Houston, US (1)	Clay	(Canada) Daniel Nestor	(United States) Jan-Michael Gambill (United States) Graydon Oliver	6–4, 6–3
Win	28.	19 May 2003	Hamburg, Germany (2)	Clay	(Canada) Daniel Nestor	(India) Mahesh Bhupathi (Belarus) Max Mirnyi	6–4, 7–6^{(12–10)}
Win	29.	16 June 2003	London/Queen's Club, England (1)	Grass	(Canada) Daniel Nestor	(India) Mahesh Bhupathi (Belarus) Max Mirnyi	5–7, 6–4, 7–6^{(7–3)}
Win	30.	27 October 2003	Basel, Switzerland (1)	Carpet (i)	(Canada) Daniel Nestor	(Argentina) Lucas Arnold Ker (Argentina) Mariano Hood	6–4, 6–2
Win	31.	1 March 2004	Marseille, France	Hard (i)	(Canada) Daniel Nestor	(Czech Republic) Martin Damm (Czech Republic) Cyril Suk	7–5, 6–3
Win	32.	3 May 2004	Barcelona, Spain (1)	Clay	(Canada) Daniel Nestor	(Argentina) Mariano Hood (Argentina) Sebastián Prieto	4–6, 6–3, 6–4
Loss	23.	14 June 2004	London/Queen's Club, England	Grass	(Canada) Daniel Nestor	(United States) Bob Bryan (United States) Mike Bryan	4–6, 4–6
Win	33.	9 August 2004	Cincinnati, US (3)	Hard	(Canada) Daniel Nestor	(Sweden) Jonas Björkman (Australia) Todd Woodbridge	6–2, 3–6, 6–3
Win	34.	13 September 2004	New York, US	Hard	(Canada) Daniel Nestor	(India) Leander Paes (Czech Republic) David Rikl	6–3, 6–3
Win	35.	25 October 2004	Madrid, Spain (2)	Hard (i)	(Canada) Daniel Nestor	(United States) Bob Bryan (United States) Mike Bryan	6–3, 6–4
Loss	24.	14 February 2005	Marseille, France	Hard (i)	(Canada) Daniel Nestor	(Czech Republic) Martin Damm (Czech Republic) Radek Štěpánek	6–7^{(4–7)}, 6–7^{(5–7)}
Win	36.	21 March 2005	Indian Wells, US (3)	Hard	(Canada) Daniel Nestor	(Australia) Wayne Arthurs (Australia) Paul Hanley	7–6^{(8–6)}, 7–6^{(7–2)}
Win	37.	25 April 2005	Houston, US (2)	Clay	(Canada) Daniel Nestor	(Argentina) Martín García (Peru) Luis Horna	6–3, 6–4
Win	38.	17 October 2005	Vienna, Austria	Hard (i)	(Canada) Daniel Nestor	(Israel) Jonathan Erlich (Israel) Andy Ram	5–3, 5–4^{(5–2)}
Win	39.	24 October 2005	Madrid, Spain (3)	Hard (i)	(Canada) Daniel Nestor	(India) Leander Paes (Serbia and Montenegro) Nenad Zimonjić	3–6, 6–3, 6–2
Loss	25.	7 November 2005	Paris, France	Carpet	(Canada) Daniel Nestor	(United States) Bob Bryan (United States) Mike Bryan	4–6, 7–6^{(7–3)}, 4–6
Win	40.	6 February 2006	Delray Beach, US	Hard	(Canada) Daniel Nestor	(South Africa) Chris Haggard (South Africa) Wesley Moodie	6–2, 6–3
Loss	26.	20 February 2006	Marseille, France	Hard (i)	(Canada) Daniel Nestor	(Czech Republic) Martin Damm (Czech Republic) Radek Štěpánek	2–6, 7–6^{(7–4)}, [3–10]
Loss	27.	6 March 2006	Dubai, UAE	Hard	(Canada) Daniel Nestor	(Australia) Paul Hanley (Zimbabwe) Kevin Ullyett	6–1, 2–6, [1–10]
Win	41.	20 March 2006	Indian Wells, US (4)	Hard	(Canada) Daniel Nestor	(United States) Bob Bryan (United States) Mike Bryan	6–4, 6–4
Win	42.	1 May 2006	Barcelona, Spain (2)	Clay	(Canada) Daniel Nestor	(Poland) Mariusz Fyrstenberg (Poland) Marcin Matkowski	6–2, 6–7^{(4–7)}, [10–5]
Win	43.	15 May 2006	Rome, Italy (2)	Clay	(Canada) Daniel Nestor	(Israel) Jonathan Erlich (Israel) Andy Ram	6–4, 5–7, [13–11]
Loss	28.	22 May 2006	Hamburg, Germany	Clay	(Canada) Daniel Nestor	(Australia) Paul Hanley (Zimbabwe) Kevin Ullyett	2–6, 6–7^{(8–10)}
Loss	29.	23 October 2006	Madrid, Spain	Hard (i)	(Canada) Daniel Nestor	(United States) Bob Bryan (United States) Mike Bryan	5–7, 4–6
Win	44.	30 October 2006	Basel, Switzerland (2)	Carpet (i)	(Canada) Daniel Nestor	(Poland) Mariusz Fyrstenberg (Poland) Marcin Matkowski	4–6, 6–4, [10–8]
Loss	30.	20 November 2006	Shanghai, China	Hard (i)	(Canada) Daniel Nestor	(Sweden) Jonas Björkman (Belarus) Max Mirnyi	2–6, 4–6
Loss	31.	15 January 2007	Sydney, Australia	Hard	(Canada) Daniel Nestor	(Australia) Paul Hanley (Zimbabwe) Kevin Ullyett	4–6, 7–6^{(7–3)}, [6–10]
Loss	32.	19 February 2007	Marseille, France	Hard (i)	(Canada) Daniel Nestor	(France) Arnaud Clément (France) Michaël Llodra	5–7, 6–4, [8–10]
Loss	33.	16 April 2007	Houston, US	Clay	(Canada) Daniel Nestor	(United States) Bob Bryan (United States) Mike Bryan	6–7^{(3–7)}, 4–6
Win	45.	11 June 2007	Paris, France	Clay	(Canada) Daniel Nestor	(Czech Republic) Lukáš Dlouhý (Czech Republic) Pavel Vízner	2–6, 6–3, 6–4
Win	46.	17 June 2007	London/Queen's Club, England (2)	Grass	(Canada) Daniel Nestor	(United States) Bob Bryan (United States) Mike Bryan	7–6^{(7–4)}, 7–5
Loss	34.	28 October 2007	Basel, Switzerland	Carpet	(United States) James Blake	(United States) Bob Bryan (United States) Mike Bryan	1–6, 1–6
Win	47.	18 November 2007	Shanghai, China	Hard (i)	(Canada) Daniel Nestor	(Sweden) Simon Aspelin (Austria) Julian Knowle	6–2, 6–3
Win	48.	2 March 2008	Memphis, US (3)	Hard (i)	(India) Mahesh Bhupathi	(Thailand) Sanchai Ratiwatana (Thailand) Sonchat Ratiwatana	7–6^{(7–5)}, 6–2
Win	49.	8 March 2008	Dubai, UAE (2)	Hard	(India) Mahesh Bhupathi	(Czech Republic) Martin Damm (Czech Republic) Pavel Vízner	7–5, 7–6^{(9–7)}
Loss	35.	26 March 2008	Miami, US	Hard	(India) Mahesh Bhupathi	(United States) Bob Bryan (United States) Mike Bryan	2–6, 2–6
Loss	36.	27 April 2008	Monte Carlo, Monaco	Clay	(India) Mahesh Bhupathi	(Spain) Rafael Nadal (Spain) Tommy Robredo	3–6, 3–6
Loss	37.	23 August 2008	New Haven, US	Hard	(India) Mahesh Bhupathi	(Brazil) Marcelo Melo (Brazil) André Sá	5–7, 2–6
Loss	38.	13 October 2008	Madrid, Spain	Hard (i)	(India) Mahesh Bhupathi	(Poland) Mariusz Fyrstenberg (Poland) Marcin Matkowski	4–6, 2–6
Win	50.	18 October 2008	Basel, Switzerland (3)	Carpet	(India) Mahesh Bhupathi	(Germany) Christopher Kas (Germany) Philipp Kohlschreiber	6–3, 6–3
Loss	39.	31 January 2009	Melbourne, Australia	Hard	(India) Mahesh Bhupathi	(United States) Bob Bryan (United States) Mike Bryan	6–2, 5–7, 0–6
Win	51.	22 February 2009	Memphis, United States (4)	Hard (i)	(United States) Mardy Fish	(United States) Travis Parrott (Slovakia) Filip Polášek	7–6^{(9–7)}, 6–1
Loss	40.	26 April 2009	Barcelona, Spain	Clay	(India) Mahesh Bhupathi	(Canada) Daniel Nestor (Serbia) Nenad Zimonjić	3–6, 6–7^{(9–11)}
Win	52.	16 August 2009	Montréal, Canada (2)	Hard	(India) Mahesh Bhupathi	(Belarus) Max Mirnyi (Israel) Andy Ram	6–4, 6–3
Loss	41.	13 September 2009	New York, US	Hard	(India) Mahesh Bhupathi	(Czech Republic) Lukáš Dlouhý (India) Leander Paes	6–3, 3–6, 2–6
Loss	42.	11 October 2009	Beijing, China	Hard	(United States) Andy Roddick	(United States) Bob Bryan (United States) Mike Bryan	4–6, 2–6
Loss	43.	25 April 2010	Barcelona, Spain	Clay	(Australia) Lleyton Hewitt	(Canada) Daniel Nestor (Serbia) Nenad Zimonjić	6–4, 3–6, [6–10]
Win	53.	8 August 2010	Washington, United States	Hard	(United States) Mardy Fish	(Czech Republic) Tomáš Berdych (Czech Republic) Radek Štěpánek	4–6, 7–6^{(9–7)}, [10–7]
Loss	44.	14 November 2010	Paris, France	Hard (i)	(Israel) Andy Ram	(India) Mahesh Bhupathi (Belarus) Max Mirnyi	5–7, 5–7
Win	54.	31 July 2011	Los Angeles, United States	Hard	(Belgium) Xavier Malisse	(India) Somdev Devvarman (Philippines) Treat Conrad Huey	7–6^{(7–3)}, 7–6^{(12–10)}
Win	55.	19 February 2012	San Jose, United States	Hard (i)	(Belgium) Xavier Malisse	(South Africa) Kevin Anderson (Germany) Frank Moser	6–4, 1–6, [10–5]

== Doubles performance timeline ==
Key
W	F	SF	QF	#R	RR	Q#	DNQ	A	NH

(W) winner; (F) finalist; (SF) semifinalist; (QF) quarterfinalist; (#R) rounds 4, 3, 2, 1; (RR) round-robin stage; (Q#) qualification round; (DNQ) did not qualify; (A) absent; (NH) not held; (SR) strike rate (events won / competed); (W–L) win–loss record.

Tournament	1991	1992	1993	1994	1995	1996	1997	1998	1999	2000	2001	2002	2003	2004	2005	2006	2007	2008	2009	2010	2011	2012	2013	SR	W–L
Grand slam tournaments
Australian Open	A	A	2R	1R	F	QF	QF	1R	2R	1R	2R	W	F	QF	1R	1R	SF	SF	F	A	2R	A	A	1 / 18	42–17
French Open	A	A	A	A	3R	2R	2R	F	2R	1R	3R	F	3R	QF	SF	2R	W	1R	3R	2R	1R	3R	A	1 / 18	39–16
Wimbledon	A	2R	QF	2R	SF	3R	3R	3R	SF	3R	3R	F	QF	SF	QF	SF	QF	1R	QF	1R	1R	1R	1R	0 / 22	45–22
US Open	A	A	1R	SF	QF	1R	A	F	1R	1R	QF	QF	SF	W	1R	3R	QF	3R	F	3R	3R	1R	A	1 / 19	44–18
Win–loss	0–0	1–1	4–3	5–3	14–4	6–4	6–3	12–4	5–3	2–4	8–4	19–3	14–4	16–3	7–4	7–4	16–3	6–4	15–4	3–3	3–4	2–3	0–1	3 / 77	171–73
Olympics
Olympics	NH	1R	Not Held			2R	Not Held			QF	Not Held			1R	Not Held			1R	Not Held			A	NH	0 / 5	3–5
Year End Championships
Tour Finals	A	A	A	A	RR	RR	RR	F	A	SF	A	NH	SF	SF	RR	F	W	RR	SF	A	A	A	A	1 / 12	22–22
Masters Tournaments
Indian Wells	A	A	A	1R	2R	1R	W	2R	2R	1R	1R	W	QF	SF	W	W	1R	QF	2R	A	QF	1R	A	4 / 18	34–14
Miami	A	A	1R	F	QF	SF	F	SF	2R	2R	SF	W	QF	SF	SF	1R	QF	F	1R	1R	A	1R	A	1 / 19	38–18
Monte Carlo	A	A	A	1R	A	A	A	A	QF	2R	1R	QF	2R	SF	QF	2R	2R	F	QF	QF	A	A	A	0 / 13	11–13
Rome	A	A	A	1R	1R	1R	W	1R	QF	1R	1R	QF	QF	QF	QF	W	SF	2R	SF	2R	2R	A	A	2 / 18	22–16
Madrid	A	A	A	1R	2R	2R	QF	2R	1R	A	1R	W	QF	W	W	F	2R	F	2R	2R	1R	A	A	3 / 17	20–14
Canada	A	A	W	SF	2R	F	2R	QF	2R	QF	2R	F	2R	SF	QF	SF	QF	QF	W	2R	1R	1R	A	2 / 20	32–18
Cincinnati	A	A	2R	A	F	W	A	W	SF	1R	1R	QF	SF	W	SF	QF	QF	SF	SF	QF	1R	A	A	3 / 17	32–14
Shanghai	Not Held																		SF	1R	1R	A	A	0 / 3	2–3
Paris	A	A	A	2R	QF	QF	QF	SF	SF	A	2R	QF	SF	QF	F	QF	2R	2R	2R	F	1R	A	A	0 / 17	22–17
Hamburg	A	A	A	A	1R	W	2R	QF	QF	2R	SF	QF	W	QF	QF	F	2R	2R	NME					2 / 14	21–12
Win–loss	0–0	0–0	6–2	9–7	9–8	15–6	16–5	14–7	9–9	4–7	11–9	26–6	13–8	21–7	20–7	19–7	6–9	12–9	12–8	8–8	3–7	0–3	0–0	17 / 156	234–139
Ranking	534	139	63	30	7	7	19	9	35	48	19	1	8	1	7	5	4	7	5	25	58	127	-	2014: 702, 2015: 1198	

== Grand Slam finals ==
=== Mixed doubles: 2 (1 title, 1 runner-up) ===
Result	Year	Championship	Surface	Partner	Opponents	Score
Loss	2002	French Open	Clay	(Russia) Elena Bovina	(Zimbabwe) Cara Black (Zimbabwe) Wayne Black	3–6, 3–6
Win	2009	Wimbledon	Grass	(Germany) Anna-Lena Grönefeld	(Zimbabwe) Cara Black (India) Leander Paes	7–5, 6–3
