= Federación Dominicana de Tenis =

Governing body for tennis in the Dominican Republic

Dominican Repúblic Tennis Federation
- Federación Dominicana de Tenis
- Sport: Tennis
- Abbreviation: FEDOTENIS
- Affiliation: International Tennis Federation (ITF)
- Regional affiliation: Central American and Caribbean (COTECC)
- Location: Centro Nacional de Tenis, Santo Domingo Este, Santo Domingo Province, Dominican Republic
- President: Persio Maldonado Sánchez
- Vice president: Sergio Tobal
- Secretary: Rubén Tejeda
- Men's coach: Sixto Espinal
- Women's coach: Daysi Espinal

Official website
- fedotenis.org.do
- (Dominican Republic)

The Dominican Republic Tennis Federation (FEDOTENIS) is the governing body for tennis in the Dominican Republic.

The National Federation is led by Mr. Persio Maldonado, reelected in 2025. The national coach is Sixto Camacho and the Daysi Espinal is the Billie Jean King Cup team captain.

== Affiliations ==
- International Tennis Federation (ITF)
- Central American and Caribbean (COTECC)
- Dominican Republic Olympic Committee
