= South America Tennis Confederation =

- Member nations of South America Tennis Confederation

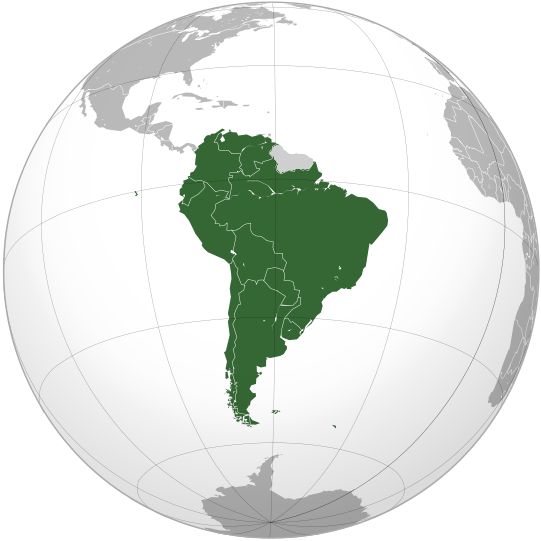
- Sport: Tennis
- Jurisdiction: Regional
- Abbreviation: (SATC)
- Founded: October 20, 1947
- Affiliation: International Tennis Federation
- Headquarters: Confederación Sudamericana de Tenis
- Location: Asunción, Paraguay
- President: Rafael Westrupp
- Other key staff: Rubén Marturet (General Secretary); Edmundo Rodríguez (Director)

Official website
- www.cosat.org

South America Tennis Confederation (Spanish: Confederacion Sudamericana de Tenis or COSAT) (Portuguese: Confederação Sul Americana de Tênis) is a private non-profit organization, affiliated with International Tennis Federation. It is the regional body of tennis associations of most of the nations of the South America, excluding Guyana and Suriname, which are the members of Central American & Caribbean Tennis Confederation (COTECC).

== Member nations ==
South America Tennis Confederation affiliates ten South American nations:

Country	Association	Headquarter
Argentina	Argentina Tennis Association	Buenos Aires
Bolivia	Bolivian Tennis Federation	La Paz
Brazil	Brazilian Tennis Confederation	Florianópolis
Colombia	Colombian Tennis Federation	Bogotá
Chile	Chile Tennis Federation	Santiago
Ecuador	Ecuadorian Federation of Tennis	Guayaquil
Paraguay	Paraguayan Tennis Association	Asunción
Peru	Tennis Federation of Peru	Lima
Uruguay	Uruguayan Association of Tennis	Montevideo
Venezuela	Venezuelan Tennis Federation	Caracas
