= Bruna Colósio =

Brazilian tennis player

- Country (sports): Brazil
- Born: 13 October 1980 (age 44); Cascavel, Brazil
- Retired: 2005
- Plays: Right-handed
- Prize money: $31,707

Singles
- Career record: 86–56
- Career titles: 2 ITF
- Highest ranking: No. 291 (21 July 2003)

Grand Slam singles results
- Wimbledon Junior: 2R (1997)
- US Open Junior: 1R (1997)

Doubles
- Career record: 84–36
- Career titles: 11 ITF
- Highest ranking: No. 193 (12 January 2004)

Team competitions
- Fed Cup: Play-offs (2003, 2004)
Medal record
Pan American Games
Gold medal – first place	2003 Santo Domingo	Doubles

Bruna Colósio (born 13 October 1980) is a retired Brazilian tennis player.

Colósio has won the Gold medal partnering Joana Cortez at the 2003 Pan American Games, as well as two singles and eleven doubles titles on the ITF circuit in her career. On 21 July 2003, she reached her best singles ranking of world number 291. On 12 January 2004, she peaked at number 193 in the WTA doubles rankings.

Playing for Brazil at the Fed Cup, Bruna has a win–loss record of 7–6.

== Tennis career ==
=== Junior ===
Bruna had a successful junior career, peaking at world number 43 in singles and No. 10 in doubles; both on December 31, 1997. She reached a total of eleven finals in doubles; with nine titles. Colósio won her only singles titles in her only final. She played at all the Grand Slam events except the Australian Open in 1997. Colósio ended her junior career with a 34–25 record on singles and 45–15 on doubles.

In 1997, between January and March, Bruna reached eight consecutive doubles finals in eight weeks, winning six titles. Her defeats came through the hands of the year-end number-one pair, Cara Black and Irina Selyutina. During that period, she also won her only singles title, a G3 tournament in Bolivia.

=== Senior career ===
Bruna played mostly at the ITF Women's Circuit during her senior career. She played at a WTA Tour tournament main draw once, in doubles, at the WTA Brasil Open in 2002, partnering Vanessa Menga. In 2004, she tried and failed to qualify to both singles and doubles main draw at the Copa Colsanitas. During her early career, she played at the ITA circuit, peaking at No. 5, but couldn't manage to keep the good results to enter the WTA tournaments.

Her career highlights include a gold medal at the Pan American Games in Santo Domingo, partnering Joana Cortez, two ITF single titles and eleven ITF doubles titles.

Colósio also played in eight ties for the Brazil Fed Cup team, in 2001, 2003–04, with a 7–6 record.

She retired from professional level in 2005.

== Career finals ==
=== ITF Women's Circuit ===
==== Singles (2–3) ====
Category $100,000 tournaments $75,000 tournaments $50,000 tournaments $25,000 tournaments $10,000 tournaments	Surface Clay (2–3)	Setting Outdoor (2–3)

Outcome	Date	Tournament	Surface	Opponent	Score
Winner	12 August 2002	ITF Manta, Ecuador	Clay	(Spain) Regina Temez	6–2, 6–2
Runner-up	18 August 2002	ITF La Paz, Bolivia	Clay	(Argentina) Sabrina Eisenberg	4–6, 7–5, 5–7
Runner-up	1 September 2002	ITF Santiago, Chile	Clay	(Argentina) Celeste Contín	3–6, 6–3, 2–6
Runner-up	17 November 2002	ITF Florianópolis, Brazil	Clay	(Brazil) Larissa Carvalho	6–2, 4–6, 5–7
Winner	9 November 2003	ITF Belo Horizonte, Brazil	Clay	(Brazil) Carla Tiene	6–4, 6–3

==== Doubles (11–7) ====
Category $100,000 tournaments $75,000 tournaments $50,000 tournaments $25,000 tournaments $10,000 tournaments	Surface Clay (5–3) Hard (6–4)	Setting Outdoor (10–6) Indoor (1–1)

Result	Date	Tournament	Surface	Partner	Opponents	Score
Runner-up	3 May 1998	ITF Guimarães, Portugal	Hard	(Portugal) Cristina Correia	(Spain) Marina Escobar (Spain) Paula Hermida	6–7, 4–6
Winner	24 May 1998	ITF Azemeis, Portugal	Hard	(Portugal) Cristina Correia	(Republic of Ireland) Kelly Liggan (Kazakhstan) Irina Selyutina	6–2, 6–4
Winner	6 September 1998	ITF Manaus, Brazil	Hard	(Brazil) Carla Tiene	(Argentina) María José Gaidano (United Kingdom) Joanne Moore	3–6, 6–3, 6–4
Winner	22 July 2001	ITF São José dos Campos, Brazil	Hard	(Brazil) Carla Tiene	(Argentina) Melisa Arévalo (Brazil) Vanessa Menga	6–3, 7–5
Winner	21 July 2002	ITF Campos do Jordão, Brazil	Hard	(Brazil) Carla Tiene	(Netherlands) Jolanda Mens (Netherlands) Andrea van der Hurk	6–1, 4–6, 6–4
Runner-up	18 August 2002	ITF La Paz, Bolivia	Clay	(Brazil) Lívia Azzi	(Bolivia) Daniela Alvaréz (Uruguay) Ana Lucía de León	6–1, 3–6, 0–6
Winner	25 August 2002	ITF Asuncion, Paraguay	Clay	(Brazil) Nanda Alves	(Argentina) María José Argeri (Brazil) Larissa Carvalho	6–4, 1–6, 6–2
Winner	1 September 2002	ITF Santiago, Chile	Clay	(Argentina) Celeste Contín	(Brazil) Larissa Carvalho (Argentina) Soledad Esperón	w/o
Winner	17 November 2002	ITF Florianópolis, Brazil	Clay	(Brazil) Larissa Carvalho	(Brazil) Marcela Evangelista (Brazil) Letícia Sobral	6–4, 6–4
Runner-up	26 January 2003	ITF Miami, United States	Hard	(Brazil) Vanessa Menga	(United States) Beau Jones (Latvia) Anžela Žguna	4–6, 6–4, 4–6
Runner-up	23 February 2003	ITF Columbus, United States	Hard (i)	(Brazil) Joana Cortez	(China) Li Ting (China) Sun Tiantian	3–6, 1–6
Winner	25 May 2003	ITF Catania, Italy	Clay	(Brazil) Joana Cortez	(France) Aurélie Védy (Greece) Christina Zachariadou	6–1, 6–1
Winner	5 October 2003	ITF Greenville, United States	Clay	(Brazil) Joana Cortez	(United States) Kelly McCain (United States) Kristen Schlukebir	6–2, 7–5
Runner-up	9 November 2003	ITF Belo Horizonte, Brazil	Hard	(Brazil) Joana Cortez	(Brazil) Marcela Evangelista (Brazil) Carla Tiene	3–6, 6–7^{(4)}
Winner	16 November 2003	ITF Mexico City, Mexico	Hard	(Brazil) Joana Cortez	(Brazil) Nanda Alves (Brazil) Carla Tiene	1–6, 6–3, 6–3
Winner	30 May 2004	ITF Houston, United States	Hard (i)	(Republic of Ireland) Anne Mall	(United States) Angela Haynes (United States) Ahsha Rolle	7–6^{(4)}, 6–4
Runner-up	5 September 2004	ITF Asuncion, Paraguay	Clay	(Uruguay) Ana Lucía de León	(Argentina) Betina Jozami (Argentina) Verónica Spiegel	5–7, 4–6
Runner-up	12 September 2004	ITF Santiago, Chile	Clay	(Uruguay) Ana Lucía de León	(Argentina) María José Argeri (Brazil) Letícia Sobral	2–6, 0–6

=== ITF Junior's finals ===
==== Singles (1–0) ====
Category Category G3 (1–0)	Surface Clay (1–0)	Setting Outdoor (1–0)

Outcome	Date	Category	Tournament	Surface	Opponent	Score
Winner	9 February 1995	Grade 3	Condor de Plata Tournament, Bolivia	Clay	(Poland) Olga Rejniak	6–4, 6–2

==== Doubles (9–2) ====
Category Category G1 (1–1) Category G2 (2–1) Category G3 (4–0) Category GB2 (2–0)	Surface Clay (8–2) Hard (1–0)	Setting Outdoor (9–2)

Outcome	Date	Category	Tournament	Surface	Partner	Opponents	Score
Winner	14 October 1995	Grade 3	Copa Banco Econômico, Brazil	Hard	(Peru) Déborah Gaviria	(Mexico) Ana Elizabeth Jimenez (Mexico) Paola Palencio	6–2, 6–2
Winner	24 March 1996	Grade B2	South America Closed Championships, Brazil	Clay	(Brazil) Carla Tiene	(Brazil) Renata Brito (Brazil) Lilian Silva	6–4, 5–0 ret.
Winner	20 October 1996	Grade 3	13th Gerdau-Cooper Tennis Cup, Brazil	Clay	(Brazil) Carla Tiene	(Brazil) Joana Cortez (Brazil) Marilia Fritelli	6–4, 0–6, 6–4
Winner	26 January 1997	Grade 2	Nicolas Macchiavello Almeida Cup, Ecuador	Clay	(Brazil) Carla Tiene	(Ukraine) Ioulia Mirnaia (Poland) Olga Gorzelak	6–3, 3–6, 6–3
Winner	2 February 1997	Grade 3	13th Inka Bowl, Peru	Clay	(Mexico) Paola Palencio	(Slovakia) Olivia Karlikova (Israel) Anat Katz	6–3, 6–2
Winner	9 February 1997	Grade 3	Condor de Plata Tournament, Bolivia	Clay	(Mexico) Paola Palencio	(Brazil) Joana Cortez (Mexico) Lourdes Lopez	6–2, 6–0
Winner	16 February 1997	Grade 2	19th Milo Cup, Chile	Clay	(Mexico) Paola Palencio	(Argentina) Melisa Arévalo (Argentina) Ana Laura Viglione	6–3, 6–3
Runner-up	23 February 1997	Grade 2	Argentina Cup	Clay	(Mexico) Paola Palencio	(Zimbabwe) Cara Black (Kazakhstan) Irina Selyutina	3–6, 6–2, 4–6
Runner-up	9 March 1997	Grade 1	17th Asuncion Bowl, Paraguay	Clay	(Mexico) Paola Palencio	(Zimbabwe) Cara Black (Kazakhstan) Irina Selyutina	3–6, 3–6
Winner	16 March 1997	Grade 1	27th Banana Bowl, Brazil	Clay	(Portugal) Cristina Correia	(Brazil) Joana Cortez (Brazil) Simone Jardim	6–4, 6–2
Winner	25 March 1997	Grade B2	South America Closed Championships, Brazil	Clay	(Brazil) Carla Tiene	(Brazil) Joana Cortez (Brazil) Simone Jardim	6–4, 7–6
