= Brazilian Tennis Confederation =

Governing body of tennis, beach tennis and wheelchair tennis in Brazil

Confederação Brasileira de Tênis
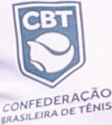
- Sport: Tennis; Beach tennis; Wheelchair tennis
- Abbreviation: (CBT)
- Founded: November 19, 1955; 69 years ago
- Location: Florianópolis, SC
- President: Alexandre Farias

Official website
- www.cbtenis.com.br
- (Brazil)

The Brazilian Tennis Confederation (Portuguese: Confederação Brasileira de Tênis or CBT) is the governing body of tennis in Brazil. CBT is responsible for the organization of events such as the Brasil Open and for representing players in Brazil in all tennis, beach tennis and wheelchair tennis categories and tournaments.

It is affiliated with the International Tennis Federation, the Brazilian Olympic Committee, the Brazilian Paralympic Committee and the South America Tennis Confederation.

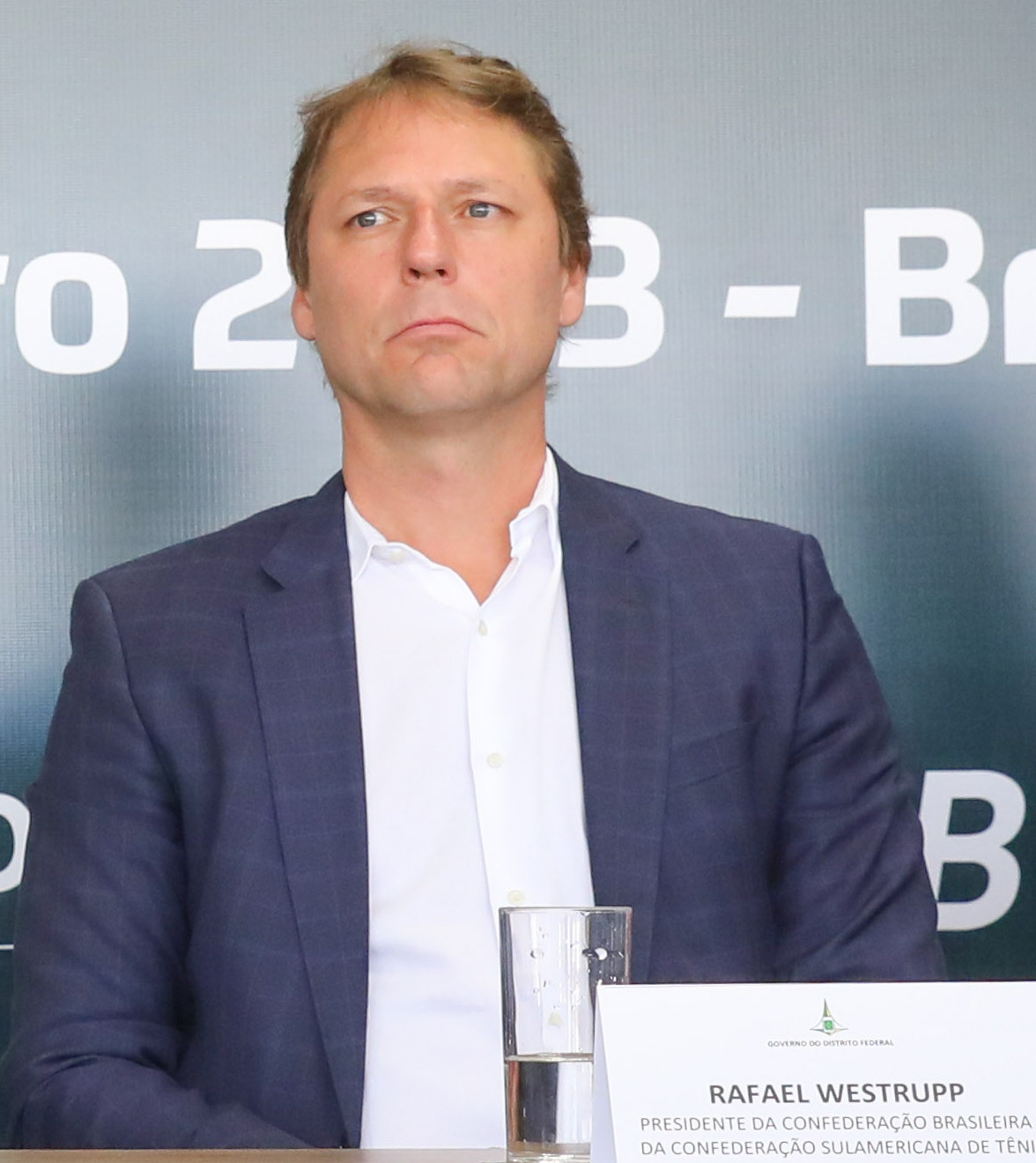
Rafael Westrupp, president of the CBT from 2017 to 2025

Founders: Waldomiro Salles Pereira, Alcides Procópio and João Havelange

The Brazilian Tennis Confederation was founded on November 19, 1955 in Rio de Janeiro by the following organizations: São Paulo Tennis Federation, Rio Grande do Sul Tennis Federation (currently the Gaucho Tennis Federation), Ceará Tennis Federation, Santa Catarina Tennis Federation, Pernambuco Amateur Sports Federation, Bahia Land Sports Federation, Pará Sports Federation, Espirito Santo Sports Federation, Fluminense Sports Federation, Amapá Sports Federation and Metropolitan Tennis Federation (currently the Rio de Janeiro State Tennis Federation).

The first president of the Brazilian Tennis Confederation was the Santa Catarina congressman Leoberto Leal, who died in a plane crash that also claimed the life of Jorge Lacerda, former governor of Santa Catarina and grandfather of the former president of the CBT, Jorge Lacerda.

The CBT is the organization that regulates the national adult, senior and youth tournaments, in addition to being responsible for the teams that represent Brazil in international team competitions such as the Davis Cup and the Fed Cup.

Brazil has competed in the Davis Cup since 1933 and has reached the semi-finals of the competition twice, in 1992 and 2000. Brazil made its debut in the Billie Jean King Cup (formerly known as Fed Cup) in 1965 and the Brazilian team reached the quarter-finals of the World Group twice, in 1965 and 1982.

== Olympics ==
Updated until 2024 Summer Olympics

Year	Medal	Name	Event
1968	Bronze	Suzana Petersen	Exhibition women's singles
1968	Bronze	Suzana Petersen	Exhibition women's doubles
1968	Bronze	Suzana Petersen	Exhibition mixed doubles
2020	Bronze	Laura Pigossi; Luisa Stefani	Women's doubles

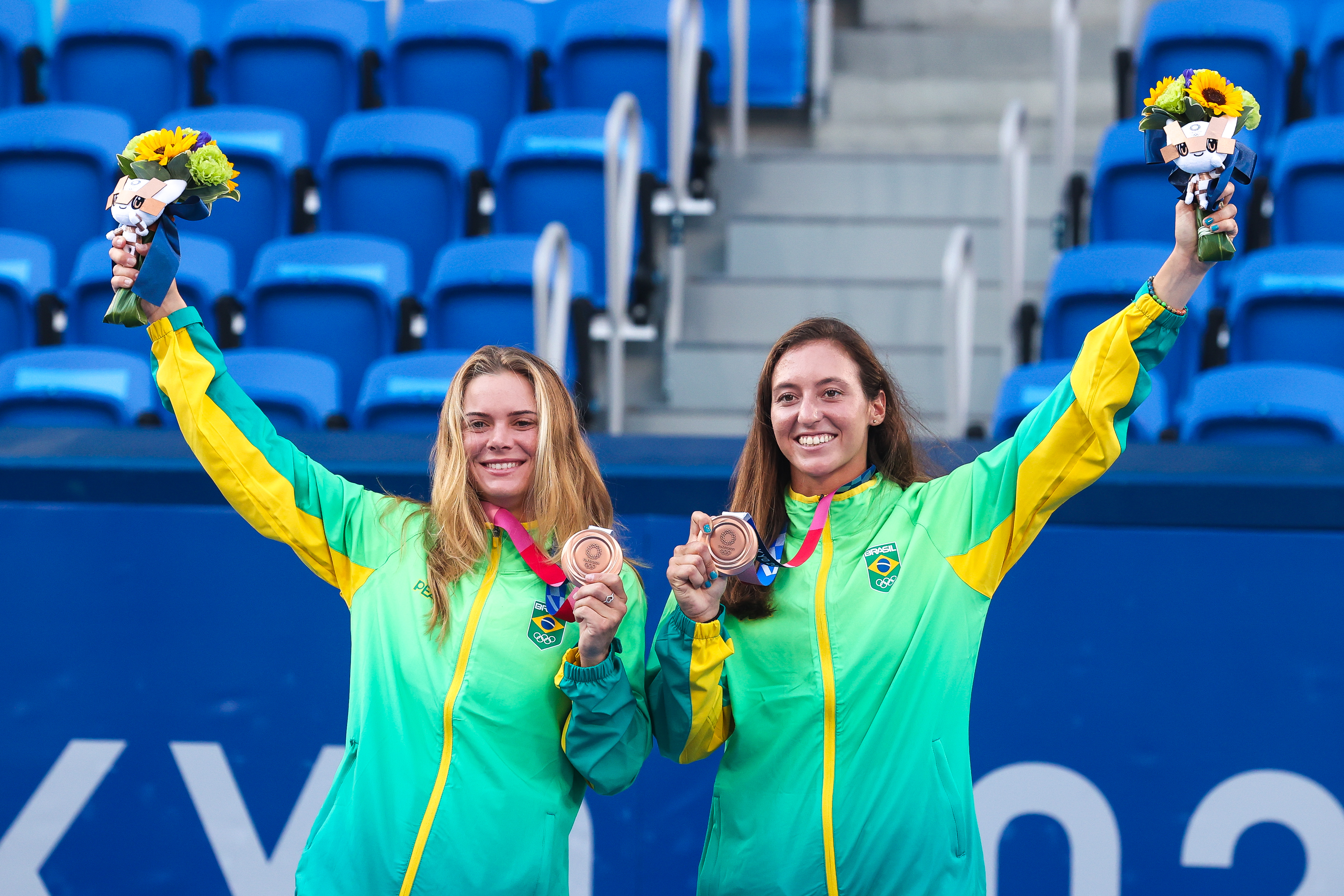
Laura Pigossi and Luisa Stefani from Brazil, winners of the women’s doubles bronze medal at the 2020 Summer Olympic Games.
