= Chile Tennis Federation =

National governing body of tennis in Chile

Coordinates: 33.40609388162225°S 70.58327271932933°W

- Sport: Tennis
- Jurisdiction: National
- Abbreviation: (CTF)
- Founded: April 3, 1920
- Affiliation: International Tennis Federation
- Affiliation date: 1924
- Regional affiliation: South America Tennis Confederation
- Affiliation date: 1948
- Headquarters: Cerro Colorado 4661
- Location: Las Condes, Santiago
- President: Sergio Elias Aboid
- Secretary: Jose Campos Flores
- Men's coach: Nicolás Massú (Davis Cup)
- Women's coach: Jorge Ibáñez (Fed Cup)

Official website
- www.fetech.cl
- (Chile)

Chile Tennis Federation (Spanish: Federación de Tenis de Chile) is the national governing body of tennis in Chile. The federation was formed on April 3, 1920, in Santiago, under the name of the Lawn Tennis Association of Chile (LTAC). In 1948 LTAC joined the International Tennis Federation. At the national level it is affiliated to the Chilean Olympic Committee and on region basis it is the member of South America Tennis Confederation.

Chile Tennis Federation operates all of the Chilean national representative tennis sides, including the Chile Davis Cup team, the Chile Fed Cup team and youth sides as well. CTF is also responsible for organizing and hosting tennis tournaments within Chile and scheduling the home international fixtures.
