= Centro Nacional de Tenis =

Tennis centre in Santo Domingo Este, Santo Domingo Province, Dominican Republic

- Interactive map of Centro Nacional de Tenis
- Location: Santo Domingo Este, Santo Domingo Province, Dominican Republic
- Coordinates: 18.4791701°N 69.8603659°W
- Elevation: 34 m (112 ft)
- Operator: Federación Dominicana de Tenis
- Capacity: 3,700 Main court
- Surface: Hard (Plexipave)

Construction
- Opened: 2003
- Renovated: 2018

Tenants
- Tennis events for the 2003 Pan American Games, and 2026 Central American and Caribbean Games

The Centro Nacional de Tenis (English: National Tennis Center) is a complex of tennis courts, including stadiums, located in Santo Domingo Este, Santo Domingo Province, Dominican Republic.

The complex contains thirteen courts, including the main stadium with seating for 3,700 people, a restaurant and cafeteria; two VIP lounges, and the National Federation offices. The whole complex was renovated in 2018 in time for the Special Olympics World Tennis Invitational.
