= Royal Dutch Lawn Tennis Association =

Royal Dutch Lawn Tennis Association (Dutch: Koninklijke Nederlandse Lawn Tennis Bond)
- Sport: Tennis
- Abbreviation: KNLTB
- Founded: 5 June 1899
- Affiliation: International Tennis Federation
- Affiliation date: 1913 (founding member)
- Regional affiliation: Tennis Europe
- President: Roger Davids
- Replaced: Nederlandse Lawn Tennis Bond

Official website
- www.knltb.nl
- (Netherlands)

The Royal Dutch Lawn Tennis Association (Dutch: Koninklijke Nederlandse Lawn Tennis Bond) (KNLTB) is the national governing body of tennis in the Netherlands. It was constituted in 1899 in Amsterdam by 15 Dutch tennis associations as the Dutch Lawn Tennis Association and received the description "royal" upon its 40th birthday.

== See also ==
- Netherlands Davis Cup team
- Netherlands Fed Cup team
