= Central American & Caribbean Tennis Confederation =

- Sport: Tennis
- Jurisdiction: Central America and the Caribbean
- Abbreviation: (COTECC)
- Founded: 1992
- Affiliation: International Tennis Federation
- President: Persio Maldonado

Official website
- www.cotecc.org.sv

The Confederation of Tennis of Central America and the Caribbean (COTECC) is the dependency of the International Tennis Federation (ITF) in the region whose objective is to implement policies that develop tennis in Central America and the Caribbean. The organization is based in Santo Domingo Este, Dominican Republic and is made up of 34 countries.

== Purpose ==
The purpose of COTECC is to encourage, direct, organize, regulate, govern and disseminate the practice of tennis; organize, sponsor and / or run tournaments, championships, training programs and workshops for the National Tennis Federations of the Caribbean and Central America; and maintain affiliation with the ITF on behalf of the geographic area of the Caribbean and Central America.

COTECC is one of the six regional tennis divisions worldwide, together with the South American Tennis Confederation (Cosat), the African Tennis Confederation (CAT), the Asian Tennis Federation (ATF), the Tennis Federation of Oceania (OTF) and the European Tennis Association (TE).

The regional body has two Development Officers whose purpose is to continue raising the level of tennis in the region. One of them is Cecilia Ancalmo, from El Salvador, in charge of Central America and the Spanish-speaking countries of the Caribbean; and John Goede, from Suriname, responsible for the English, French and Dutch Caribbean nations.

== History ==
COTECC was created in 1992 as one of the points discussed in the Annual General Meeting of the ITF held in La Romana, Dominican Republic, in which it was agreed to create a governing body for tennis that would unite the countries of Central America, the Spanish Caribbean and the English Caribbean.

It was that same year, in Mexico, the COTECC statutes were signed and also the Mexican Jesus Topete was selected as the first president of the Confederation for a period of two years.

However, as the former president of the organism Gonzalo Mejía says, there were other organizations that preceded COTECC as tennis governing body in the area, although they never received recognition from the ITF. In 1968, as a result of the beginning of the Open Era, tennis was left out of the Olympics, which automatically meant that it was not an official sport in the Pan American or the Central American and Caribbean Games.

This situation resulted in several countries founding the Pan-American Tennis Confederation in 1971, which had the recognition of the national Olympic committees of all America, which produced the return of tennis to the Central Americans and the Caribbean Santo Domingo 74 and the Pan American Games of Mexico 75.

Mejía adds that for the year 1982, during Central American and Caribbean Games in Havana, Cuba, it formed the basis for creating the COTECC that we currently have: the Central American and Caribbean Confederation of Tennis, with a large part of the countries that make it up today.

== President ==
The COTECC elections for the Steering Committee are held every two years at the Annual General Meeting, in which the member countries choose a president, two vice-presidents, two directors and each of the four heads of the subregions.

The current president is Persio Maldonado, from the Dominican Republic, who was re-elected last June for his fourth period 2025–2027. In 2016, Maldonado assumed the presidency of the institution for the first time,

Maldonado relies on the Salvadoran Enrique Molins, who was leading the regional body between 2000 and 2016, this being the longest period for a president in the history of COTECC.

Prior to Molins and Maldonado were presidents Jesús Topete, from Mexico, (1992-1996), and Gonzalo Mejía, from the Dominican Republic, (1996-2000).

== Affiliated members ==
These are the members of COTECC:

Country	Association	Headquarters	President
Anguilla	Anguilla National Tennis Association	The Valley	Ernest Valerntine Banks
Antigua and Barbuda	Antigua and Barbuda Tennis Association	Saint John	Cordell Williams
Aruba	Aruba Lawn Tennis Bond	Oranjestad	Ronald Tchong
Bahamas	Bahamas Lawn Tennis Association	Nassau	Perry E Newton
Barbados	Barbados Lawn Tennis Association	Bridgetown	Raymond Forde
Belize	Belize Tennis Association	Belize City	Samira Musa Pott
Bermuda	Bermuda Lawn Tennis Association	Hamilton	Michael Wolfe
Bonaire	Bonaire Lawn Tennis Bond	Kralendijk	Nigel Paul
British Virgin Islands	British Virgin Islands Lawn Tennis Association	Road Town	Carol Mitchell
Cayman Islands	Tennis Federation of the Cayman Islands	George Town	Susan Lindsay
Costa Rica	Federación Costarricense de Tenis	San Jose	Carlos Bravo
Cuba	Federacion Cubana de Tenis de Campo	Havana	Alexander Ferrales
Curaçao	Tennis Federation Curaçao	Willemstad	Albert Martis
Dominican Republic	Federación Dominicana de Tenis	Santo Domingo Este	Persio Maldonado
El Salvador	Federación Salvadoreña de Tenis	San Salvador	Rafael Arévalo
French Guiana	French Guiana Tennis Fédération	Cayenne	Fabrice Prevot
Grenada	Grenada Tennis Association	St. George's	Curlan Gilchrist
Guadeloupe	Guadeloupe Tennis Federation	Point-a-Pitre	Christian Forbin
Guatemala	Federación Nacional de Tenis de Guatemala	Guatemala City	Tulio Dávila
Guyana	Guyana Tennis Association	Georgetown	Samuel Barakat
Haiti	Fédération Haitienne de Tennis	Port-au-Prince	Joseph Etienne
Honduras	Federación Hondureña de Tenis	Tegucigalpa	Ivanhoe Cálix
Jamaica	Tennis Jamaica	Kingston	Aswad Morgan
Martinique	Martinican Tennis Federation	Fort de France	Germain Soumbo
Mexico	Federación Mexicana de Tenis	Mexico City	José Antonio Flores
Nicaragua	Federacion Nicaraguense de Tenis	Managua	Luis Silva
Panama	Federación Panameña de Tenis	Panama City	Jorge Arrue
Puerto Rico	Asociacion de Tenis de Puerto Rico	Santurce	Héctor Cabrera
Saint Kitts and Nevis	Saint Kitts and Nevis Tennis Association	Bassetere	Watkins C. Chiverton
Saint Lucia	St Lucia Lawn Tennis Association	Castries	Stephen Mcnamara
Saint Vincent and the Grenadines	St. Vincent & The Grenadines Tennis Association	Kingstown	Brian Nash
Suriname	Surinaamse Tennis Bond	Paramaribo	Diego Van der Zwart
Trinidad and Tobago	Trinidad and Tobago Tennis Association	Port of Spain	Hayden Mitchell
United States Virgin Islands	Virgin Islands Tennis Association	Saint Thomas	Kelly Kuipers
