= 2014 Fed Cup Americas Zone Group II – play-offs =

The play-offs of the 2014 Fed Cup Americas Zone Group II were the final stages of the Group II Zonal Competition involving teams from the Americas. Using the positions determined in their pools, the seven teams faced off to determine their placing in the 2014 Fed Cup Americas Zone Group II. The top two teams advanced to Group I for the next year.

Placing	Pool A	Pool B	Pool C	Pool D
1	Dominican Republic	Chile	Bolivia	Costa Rica
2	Guatemala	Puerto Rico	Peru	Trinidad and Tobago
3	Panama	Barbados	Bermuda	Uruguay

== Promotion play-off ==
The first placed teams of the four pools were drawn in head-to-head rounds. The winners advanced to Group I.

=== Dominican Republic vs. Panama ===
Dominican Republic
1
Palmas Athletic Club, Humacao, Puerto Rico
12 April 2014
Hard (outdoors)

Bolivia
2

			1	2	3
1	(Dominican Republic) (Bolivia)	Michelle Marie Valdez; Daniela Ruiz	6^{5} 7^{7}	1; 6
2	(Dominican Republic) (Bolivia)	Francesca Segarelli; María Fernanda Álvarez Terán	2; 6	6; 3	6^{2} 7^{7}
3	(Dominican Republic) (Bolivia)	Glenny Cepeda / Karla Portalatin; Hortência Birnbaumer / Anelisse Torrico	6; 2	6; 4

=== Chile vs. Costa Rica ===
Chile
2
Palmas Athletic Club, Humacao, Puerto Rico
12 April 2014
Hard (outdoors)

Costa Rica
0

			1	2	3
1	(Chile) (Costa Rica)	Andrea Koch Benvenuto; Andrea Brenes	6; 1	6; 2
2	(Chile) (Costa Rica)	Daniela Seguel; Ariana Rahmanparast	6; 4	6; 3
3	(Chile) (Costa Rica)	Cecilia Costa Melgar / Daniela Seguel; Andrea Brenes / Juli Raventós				not played

== 5th–8th place play-off ==
The second placed teams of the four pools were drawn in head-to-head rounds to find the equal fifth and sixth placed teams, and the equal seventh to eighth placed teams.

=== Guatemala vs. Peru ===
Guatemala
1
Palmas Athletic Club, Humacao, Puerto Rico
12 April 2014
Hard (outdoors)

Peru
2

			1	2	3
1	(Guatemala) (Peru)	Kirsten-Andrea Weedon; Patricia Kú Flores	6; 4	6; 4
2	(Guatemala) (Peru)	Camila Ramazzini; Bianca Botto	0; 6	0; 6
3	(Guatemala) (Peru)	Camila Ramazzini / Kirsten-Andrea Weedon; Bianca Botto / Camila Vargas Gómez	7; 5	3; 6	0; 6

=== Puerto Rico vs. Trinidad and Tobago ===
Puerto Rico
2
Palmas Athletic Club, Humacao, Puerto Rico
12 April 2014
Hard (outdoors)

Trinidad and Tobago
0

			1	2	3
1	(Puerto Rico) (Trinidad and Tobago)	Ariana Rodríguez; Olivia Bennett	6; 3	2; 6	7^{7} 6^{4}
2	(Puerto Rico) (Trinidad and Tobago)	Monica Puig; Shenelle Mohammed	6; 0	6; 0
3	(Puerto Rico) (Trinidad and Tobago)	Yolimar Ogando / Monica Puig; Olivia Bennett / Anneliese Rose				not played

== 9th–12th place play-off ==
The third placed teams of the four pools were drawn in head-to-head rounds to find the equal ninth and tenth placed teams, and the equal eleventh to twelfth placed teams.

=== Panama vs. Bermuda ===
Panama
0
Palmas Athletic Club, Humacao, Puerto Rico
12 April 2014
Hard (outdoors)

Bermuda
3

			1	2	3
1	(Panama) (Bermuda)	Daniela Diez; Cayla Cross	0; 6	0; 6
2	(Panama) (Bermuda)	Karla Contreras; Tyler Smith	2; 6	0; 6
3	(Panama) (Bermuda)	Daniela Diez / Gabriela González; Jacklyn Lambert / Tara Lambert	2; 6	7; 5	5; 7

=== Barbados vs. Uruguay ===
Barbados
1
Palmas Athletic Club, Humacao, Puerto Rico
12 April 2014
Hard (outdoors)

Uruguay
2

			1	2	3
1	(Barbados) (Uruguay)	Kiana Marshall; Margot Mercier	6; 4	6; 4
2	(Barbados) (Uruguay)	Melena López; Magdalena Boado	5; 7	0; 6
3	(Barbados) (Uruguay)	Melena López / Cherise Slocombe; Magdalena Boado / Carolina de los Santos	2; 6	1; 6

== Final placements ==
Placing	Teams	
Promoted	Bolivia	Chile
Third	Dominican Republic	Costa Rica
Fifth	Puerto Rico	Peru
Seventh	Trinidad and Tobago	Guatemala
Ninth	Bermuda	Uruguay
Eleventh	Panama	Barbados

- Bolivia and Chile advanced to Group I.

== See also ==
- Fed Cup structure
