= 2014 Fed Cup Americas Zone =

Subsection of tennis competition

The Americas Zone was one of three zones of regional competition in the 2014 Fed Cup.

== Group I ==
- Venue: Yacht y Golf Club Paraguayo, Lambaré, Paraguay (Clay)
- Dates: 5–8 February

The seven teams were divided into one pool of three and one pool of four teams. The two pool winners took part in play-offs to determine the nation advancing to the World Group II play-offs. The nations finishing last in their pools took part in relegation play-offs, with the losing nation was relegated to Group II for 2015.

=== Pools ===
	Pool A	PAR	VEN	MEX
1	Paraguay (2–0)		2–0	3–0
2	Venezuela (1–1)	0–2		2–1
3	Mexico (0–2)	0–3	1–2	

	Pool B	COL	BRA	BAH	ECU
1	Colombia (2–1)		0–2	2–1	3–1
2	Brazil (3–0)	2–0		3–0	3–0
3	Bahamas (0–3)	1–2	0–3		0–3
4	Ecuador (1–2)	0–3	0–3	3–0	

=== Play-offs ===
Placing	A Team	Score	B Team
Promotion	Paraguay	0–2	Brazil
3rd	N/A	–	Colombia
Relegation	Mexico	2–1	Ecuador
Relegation	Venezuela	2–0	Bahamas

- Brazil was promoted to World Group II play-offs
- Ecuador and Bahamas was relegated to Americas Zone Group II in 2015.

== Group II ==
- Venue: Palmas Athletic Club, Humacao, Puerto Rico (hard, outdoors)
- Date: 7–12 April

The twelve teams were divided into four pools of three teams. The four pool winners took part in play-offs to determine the two nations being promoted to Group I.

=== Pools ===
	Pool A	DOM	GUA	PAN
1	Dominican Republic (2–0)		2–1	3–0
2	Guatemala (1–1)	1–2		3–0
3	Panama (0–2)	0–3	0–3	

	Pool B	CHI	PUR	BAR
1	Chile (2–0)		2–1	3–0
2	Puerto Rico (1–1)	1–2		3–0
3	Barbados (0–2)	0–3	0–3	

	Pool C	BOL	PER	BER
1	Bolivia (2–0)		2–1	2–1
2	Peru (1–1)	1–2		3–0
3	Bermuda (0–2)	1–2	0–3	

	Pool D	CRC	TRI	URU
1	Costa Rica (2–0)		2–1	2–1
2	Trinidad and Tobago (1–1)	1–2		2–1
3	Uruguay (0–2)	1–2	1–2	

=== Play-offs ===
Placing	A Team	Score	C Team
Promotional	Dominican Republic	1–2	Bolivia
5th–8th	Guatemala	1–2	Peru
9th–12th	Panama	0–3	Bermuda

Placing	B Team	Score	D Team
Promotional	Chile	2–0	Costa Rica
5th–8th	Puerto Rico	2–0	Trinidad and Tobago
9th–12th	Barbados	1–2	Uruguay

- Bolivia and Chile were promoted to the 2015 Group I.
