= 2014 Fed Cup Americas Zone Group I – Pool B =

Pool B of the 2014 Fed Cup Americas Group I was one of two pools in the Americas Group I of the 2014 Fed Cup. Three teams competed in a round robin competition, with the top team and the bottom two teams proceeding to their respective sections of the play-offs: the top team played for advancement to the World Group II Play-offs, while the bottom team faced potential relegation to Group II.

== Standings ==
		(Colombia) COL	(Brazil) BRA	(The Bahamas) BAH	(Ecuador) ECU	RR; W–L	Set; W–L	Game; W–L	Standings	
23	Colombia		0–2	2–1	3–0	2–1	5–3	10–6	79–57	2
25	Brazil	2–0		3–0	3–0	3–0	8–0	16–0	98–36	1
45	Bahamas	1–2	0–3		0–3	0–3	1–8	2–16	31–102	4
43	Ecuador	0–3	0–3	3–0		1–2	3–6	6–12	70–83	3

== Round-robin ==
=== Colombia vs. Bahamas ===
Colombia
2
Yacht y Golf Club Paraguayo, Lambaré, Paraguay
5 February 2014
Clay

Bahamas
1

			1	2	3
1	(Colombia) (The Bahamas)	Catalina Castaño; Larikah Russell	6; 0	6; 2
2	(Colombia) (The Bahamas)	Mariana Duque; Nikkita Fountain	6; 1	6; 1
3	(Colombia) (The Bahamas)	Catalina Castaño / Mariana Duque; Nikkita Fountain / Larikah Russell	1; 6	5; 7

=== Brazil vs. Ecuador ===
Brazil
3
Yacht y Golf Club Paraguayo, Lambaré, Paraguay
5 February 2014
Clay

Ecuador
0

			1	2	3
1	(Brazil) (Ecuador)	Paula Cristina Gonçalves; Charlotte Römer	6; 2	7; 5
2	(Brazil) (Ecuador)	Teliana Pereira; Doménica González	6; 2	6; 2
3	(Brazil) (Ecuador)	Gabriela Cé / Laura Pigossi; Doménica González / Charlotte Römer	6; 4	6; 4

=== Colombia vs. Ecuador ===
Colombia
3
Yacht y Golf Club Paraguayo, Lambaré, Paraguay
6 February 2014
Clay

Ecuador
0

			1	2	3
1	(Colombia) (Ecuador)	Catalina Castaño; Charlotte Römer	6; 2	6; 4
2	(Colombia) (Ecuador)	Mariana Duque; Doménica González	6; 1	6; 3
3	(Colombia) (Ecuador)	María Fernanda Herazo / Paula Andrea Pérez; Rafaella Baquerizo / Rafaela Gómez	6; 1	6; 4

=== Brazil vs. Bahamas ===
Brazil
3
Yacht y Golf Club Paraguayo, Lambaré, Paraguay
6 February 2014
Clay

Bahamas
0

			1	2	3
1	(Brazil) (The Bahamas)	Paula Cristina Gonçalves; Iesha Shepherd	6; 0	6; 0
2	(Brazil) (The Bahamas)	Teliana Pereira; Nikkita Fountain	6; 0	6; 0
3	(Brazil) (The Bahamas)	Gabriela Cé / Laura Pigossi; Nikkita Fountain / Larikah Russell	6; 2	6; 2

=== Colombia vs. Brazil ===
Colombia
0
Yacht y Golf Club Paraguayo, Lambaré, Paraguay
7 February 2014
Clay

Brazil
2

			1	2	3
1	(Colombia) (Brazil)	Catalina Castaño; Paula Cristina Gonçalves	3; 6	4; 6
2	(Colombia) (Brazil)	Mariana Duque; Teliana Pereira	0; 6	6^{5} 7^{7}
3	(Colombia) (Brazil)	Catalina Castaño / Mariana Duque; Paula Cristina Gonçalves / Teliana Pereira	0; 6	0; 3		not completed

=== Bahamas vs. Ecuador ===
Bahamas
0
Yacht y Golf Club Paraguayo, Lambaré, Paraguay
7 February 2014
Clay

Ecuador
3

			1	2	3
1	(The Bahamas) (Ecuador)	Iesha Shepherd; Charlotte Römer	0; 6	1; 6
2	(The Bahamas) (Ecuador)	Nikkita Fountain; Doménica González	3; 6	0; 6
3	(The Bahamas) (Ecuador)	Nikkita Fountain / Larikah Russell; Rafaella Baquerizo / Rafaela Gómez	4; 6	2; 6
