= 2013 Fed Cup Americas Zone Group II – Pool A =

Group A of the 2013 Fed Cup Americas Zone Group II was one of two pools in the Americas zone of the 2013 Fed Cup. Five teams competed in a round robin competition, with the teams proceeding to their respective sections of the play-offs: the top team played for advancement to the 2014 Group I.

== Standings ==
		(Guatemala) GUA	(Ecuador) ECU	(Puerto Rico) PUR	(Bolivia) BOL	(Honduras) HON	RR; W–L	Match; W–L	Set; W–L	Game; W–L
50	Guatemala		1–2	2–1	1–2	3–0	7–5	14–13	113–92	3
62	Ecuador	2–1		3–0	2–1	3–0	10–2	20–6	128–77	1
65	Puerto Rico	1–2	0–3		1–2	2–1	4–8	9–17	87–125	4
76	Bolivia	2–1	1–2	2–1		3–0	8–4	13–6	119–82	2
	Honduras	0–3	0–3	1–2	0–3		1–11	5–21	80–141	5

== Round-robin ==
=== Guatemala vs. Honduras ===
Guatemala
3
Maya Country Club, Santa Tecla, El Salvador
16 July 2013
Red clay (outdoors)

Honduras
0

			1	2	3
1	(Guatemala) (Honduras)	Camila Ramazzini; Raquel Argeñal Matheu	2; 6	6; 1	6; 2
2	(Guatemala) (Honduras)	Kirsten-Andrea Weedon; Daniela Obando	6; 4	6; 1
3	(Guatemala) (Honduras)	Camila Ramazzini / Kirsten-Andrea Weedon; Alejandra Obando / Daniela Obando	6; 0	6; 0

=== Ecuador vs. Bolivia ===
Ecuador
2
Maya Country Club, Santa Tecla, El Salvador
16 July 2013
Red clay (outdoors)

Bolivia
1

			1	2	3
1	(Ecuador) (Bolivia)	Doménica González; Noelia Zeballos	7^{7} 6^{2}	6; 0
2	(Ecuador) (Bolivia)	Rafaela Gómez; María Inés Deheza	3; 6	3; 6
3	(Ecuador) (Bolivia)	Rafaela Gómez / Doménica González; María Inés Deheza / Noelia Zeballos	1; 6	6; 2	6; 4

=== Guatemala vs. Puerto Rico ===
Guatemala
2
Maya Country Club, Santa Tecla, El Salvador
17 July 2013
Red clay (outdoors)

Puerto Rico
1

			1	2	3
1	(Guatemala) (Puerto Rico)	Kirsten-Andrea Weedon; Ana Sofía Cordero	4; 6	6; 0	6; 1
2	(Guatemala) (Puerto Rico)	Camila Ramazzini; Yolimar Ogando	3; 6	1; 6
3	(Guatemala) (Puerto Rico)	Camila Ramazzini / Kirsten-Andrea Weedon; Ana Sofía Cordero / Yolimar Ogando	4; 6	6; 4	6; 2

=== Bolivia vs. Honduras ===
Bolivia
3
Maya Country Club, Santa Tecla, El Salvador
17 July 2013
Red clay (outdoors)

Honduras
0

			1	2	3
1	(Bolivia) (Honduras)	Nabila Farah; Daniela Obando	6; 3	6; 4
2	(Bolivia) (Honduras)	Noelia Zeballos; Alejandra Obando	6; 0	6; 1
3	(Bolivia) (Honduras)	María Inés Deheza / Daniela Ruíz; Raquel Argeñal Matheu / Daniela Obando	6; 0	2; 1		retired

=== Ecuador vs. Honduras ===
Ecuador
3
Maya Country Club, Santa Tecla, El Salvador
18 July 2013
Red clay (outdoors)

Honduras
0

			1	2	3
1	(Ecuador) (Honduras)	Rafaela Gómez; Raquel Argeñal Matheu	6; 4	6; 4
2	(Ecuador) (Honduras)	Doménica González; Alejandra Obando	6; 1	6; 1
3	(Ecuador) (Honduras)	Rafaela Gómez / Camila Romero; Raquel Argeñal Matheu / Alejandra Obando	6^{5} 7^{7}	6; 3	6; 2

=== Puerto Rico vs. Bolivia ===
Puerto Rico
1
Maya Country Club, Santa Tecla, El Salvador
18 July 2013
Red clay (outdoors)

Bolivia
2

			1	2	3
1	(Puerto Rico) (Bolivia)	Ana Sofía Cordero; María Inés Deheza	1; 6	1; 6
2	(Puerto Rico) (Bolivia)	Yolimar Ogando; Noelia Zeballos	6; 3	6; 1
3	(Puerto Rico) (Bolivia)	Ana Sofía Cordero / Yolimar Ogando; María Inés Deheza / Daniela Ruíz	4; 6	2; 6

=== Guatemala vs. Bolivia ===
Guatemala
1
Maya Country Club, Santa Tecla, El Salvador
19 July 2013
Red clay (outdoors)

Bolivia
2

			1	2	3
1	(Guatemala) (Bolivia)	Kirsten-Andrea Weedon; Nabila Farah	7; 5	6; 0
2	(Guatemala) (Bolivia)	Camila Ramazzini; Noelia Zeballos	2; 6	1; 6
3	(Guatemala) (Bolivia)	Camila Ramazzini / Kirsten-Andrea Weedon; María Inés Deheza / Daniela Ruíz	3; 6	2; 6

=== Ecuador vs. Puerto Rico ===
Ecuador
3
Maya Country Club, Santa Tecla, El Salvador
19 July 2013
Red clay (outdoors)

Puerto Rico
0

			1	2	3
1	(Ecuador) (Puerto Rico)	Rafaela Gómez; Chantal Martínez Blanco	6; 0	6; 0
2	(Ecuador) (Puerto Rico)	Doménica González; Yolimar Ogando	6; 4	6; 3
3	(Ecuador) (Puerto Rico)	Rafaela Gómez / Doménica González; Ana Sofía Cordero / Yolimar Ogando	6; 0	6; 0

== See also ==
- Fed Cup structure
