= 2019 Fed Cup Americas Zone Group I – Pool B =

Subsection of tennis competition

Pool B of the 2019 Fed Cup Americas Zone Group I was one of two pools in the Americas zone of the 2019 Fed Cup. Four teams competed in a round robin competition, with the top team and the bottom team proceeding to their respective sections of the play-offs: the top team played for advancement to the World Group II Play-offs, while the bottom team faced potential relegation to Group II.

== Standings ==
		BRA	CHI	ARG	PUR	RR; W–L	Set; W–L	Game; W–L	Standings
3	Brazil		3–0	2–1	2–1	3–0	16–6 (73%)	125–84 (60%)	1
6	Chile	0–3		3–0	3–0	2–1	14–6 (70%)	104–69 (60%)	2
2	Argentina	1–2	0–3		2–1	1–2	7–14 (33%)	99–113 (47%)	3
8	Puerto Rico	1–2	0–3	1–2		0–3	5–16 (24%)	55–117 (32%)	4

Standings are determined by: 1. number of wins; 2. number of matches; 3. in two-team ties, head-to-head records; 4. in three-team ties, (a) percentage of sets won (head-to-head records if two teams remain tied), then (b) percentage of games won (head-to-head records if two teams remain tied), then (c) Fed Cup rankings.

== Round-robin ==
=== Argentina vs. Puerto Rico ===
Argentina
2
Club Campestre Sede Llanogrande, Medellín, Colombia
6 February
Clay

Puerto Rico
1

			1	2	3
1	(Argentina) (Puerto Rico)	Catalina Pella; Lauren Anzalotta Kynoch	6; 3	6; 1
2	(Argentina) (Puerto Rico)	Victoria Bosio; Monica Puig	6; 3	5; 7	2; 6
3	(Argentina) (Puerto Rico)	Victoria Bosio / Catalina Pella; Lauren Anzalotta Kynoch / Monica Puig	6^{5} 7^{7}	6; 4	6; 1

=== Brazil vs. Chile ===
Brazil
3
Club Campestre Sede Llanogrande, Medellín, Colombia
6 February
Clay

Chile
0

			1	2	3
1	(Brazil) (Chile)	Carolina Alves; Fernanda Brito	6; 2	3; 6	6; 3
2	(Brazil) (Chile)	Beatriz Haddad Maia; Daniela Seguel	6; 3	6; 2
3	(Brazil) (Chile)	Beatriz Haddad Maia / Luisa Stefani; Bárbara Gatica / Alexa Guarachi	6; 4	5; 7	6; 3

=== Argentina vs. Chile ===
Argentina
0
Club Campestre Sede Llanogrande, Medellín, Colombia
7 February
Clay

Chile
3

			1	2	3
1	(Argentina) (Chile)	Catalina Pella; Fernanda Brito	4; 6	3; 6
2	(Argentina) (Chile)	Victoria Bosio; Daniela Seguel	5; 7	6^{4} 7^{7}
3	(Argentina) (Chile)	Carla Lucero / Jazmín Ortenzi; Bárbara Gatica / Alexa Guarachi	1; 6	1; 6

=== Brazil vs. Puerto Rico ===
Brazil
2
Club Campestre Sede Llanogrande, Medellín, Colombia
7 February
Clay

Puerto Rico
1

			1	2	3
1	(Brazil) (Puerto Rico)	Carolina Alves; Lauren Anzalotta Kynoch	6; 2	6; 0
2	(Brazil) (Puerto Rico)	Beatriz Haddad Maia; Monica Puig	6; 2	4; 6	4; 6
3	(Brazil) (Puerto Rico)	Beatriz Haddad Maia / Luisa Stefani; María Cecilia Aguiar / Erika Barquero	6; 2	6; 0

=== Argentina vs. Brazil ===
Argentina
1
Club Campestre Sede Llanogrande, Medellín, Colombia
8 February
Clay

Brazil
2

			1	2	3
1	(Argentina) (Brazil)	Catalina Pella; Carolina Alves	4; 6	4; 6
2	(Argentina) (Brazil)	Victoria Bosio; Beatriz Haddad Maia	6^{3} 7^{7}	7; 5	7^{7} 6^{4}
3	(Argentina) (Brazil)	Jazmín Ortenzi / Catalina Pella; Beatriz Haddad Maia / Luisa Stefani	5; 7	3; 6

=== Chile vs. Puerto Rico ===
Chile
3
Club Campestre Sede Llanogrande, Medellín, Colombia
8 February
Clay

Puerto Rico
0

			1	2	3
1	(Chile) (Puerto Rico)	Fernanda Brito; María Cecilia Aguiar	6; 1	6; 1
2	(Chile) (Puerto Rico)	Daniela Seguel; Erika Barquero	6; 1	6; 0
3	(Chile) (Puerto Rico)	Bárbara Gatica / Alexa Guarachi; Erika Barquero / Lauren Anzalotta Kynoch	6; 1	6; 1
