= 2016 Fed Cup Americas Zone Group I – Pool B =

Pool B of the 2016 Fed Cup Americas Zone Group I was one of two pools in the Americas zone of the 2016 Fed Cup. Four teams competed in a round robin competition, with the top team and the bottom two teams proceeding to their respective sections of the play-offs: the top team played for advancement to the World Group II Play-offs, while the bottom two teams faced potential relegation to Group II.

== Standings ==
		(Argentina) ARG	(Brazil) BRA	(Ecuador) ECU	(Peru) PER	RR; W–L	Set; W–L	Game; W–L	Standings
18	Argentina		2–1	3–0	3–0	3–0	16–2	98–46	1
19	Brazil	1–2		3–0	3–0	2–1	14–4	101–53	2
40	Ecuador	0–3	0–3		2–1	1–2	5–14	60–102	3
44	Peru	0–3	0–3	1–2		0–3	2–17	53–107	4

== Round-robin ==
=== Argentina vs. Ecuador ===
Argentina
3
Country Club Las Palmas, Santa Cruz, Bolivia
3 February 2016
Clay (outdoor)

Ecuador
0

			1	2	3
1	(Argentina) (Ecuador)	Nadia Podoroska; Camila Romero	6; 2	6; 1
2	(Argentina) (Ecuador)	María Irigoyen; Charlotte Römer	6; 2	6; 2
3	(Argentina) (Ecuador)	María Irigoyen / Catalina Pella; Rafaella Baquerizo / Marie Elise Casares	6; 0	6; 0

=== Brazil vs. Peru ===
Brazil
3
Country Club Las Palmas, Santa Cruz, Bolivia
3 February 2016
Clay (outdoor)

Peru
0

			1	2	3
1	(Brazil) (Peru)	Beatriz Haddad Maia; Anastasia Iamachkine	6; 1	7^{7} 6^{2}
2	(Brazil) (Peru)	Teliana Pereira; Dominique Schaefer	6; 1	6; 2
3	(Brazil) (Peru)	Paula Cristina Gonçalves / Beatriz Haddad Maia; Anastasia Iamachkine / Dominique Schaefer	6; 1	6; 1

=== Argentina vs. Peru ===
Argentina
3
Country Club Las Palmas, Santa Cruz, Bolivia
4 February 2016
Clay (outdoor)

Peru
0

			1	2	3
1	(Argentina) (Peru)	Nadia Podoroska; Anastasia Iamachkine	6; 2	6; 1
2	(Argentina) (Peru)	María Irigoyen; Dominique Schaefer	7^{7} 6^{3}	6; 2
3	(Argentina) (Peru)	María Irigoyen / Catalina Pella; Bianca Botto / Dominique Schaefer	6; 1	6; 1

=== Brazil vs. Ecuador ===
Brazil
3
Country Club Las Palmas, Santa Cruz, Bolivia
4 February 2016
Clay (outdoor)

Ecuador
0

			1	2	3
1	(Brazil) (Ecuador)	Beatriz Haddad Maia; Marie Elise Casares	6; 2	6; 0
2	(Brazil) (Ecuador)	Gabriela Cé; Camila Romero	7; 5	6; 0
3	(Brazil) (Ecuador)	Paula Cristina Gonçalves / Beatriz Haddad Maia; Rafaella Baquerizo / Charlotte Römer	7^{7} 6^{3}	6; 3

=== Argentina vs. Brazil ===
Argentina
2
Country Club Las Palmas, Santa Cruz, Bolivia
5 February 2016
Clay (outdoor)

Brazil
1

			1	2	3
1	(Argentina) (Brazil)	Nadia Podoroska; Beatriz Haddad Maia	7; 5	6; 3
2	(Argentina) (Brazil)	María Irigoyen; Teliana Pereira	0; 6	0; 6
3	(Argentina) (Brazil)	María Irigoyen / Catalina Pella; Paula Cristina Gonçalves / Beatriz Haddad Maia	6; 3	6; 3

=== Ecuador vs. Peru ===
Ecuador
2
Country Club Las Palmas, Santa Cruz, Bolivia
5 February 2016
Clay (outdoor)

Peru
1

			1	2	3
1	(Ecuador) (Peru)	Rafaella Baquerizo; Anastasia Iamachkine	6; 3	6; 1
2	(Ecuador) (Peru)	Charlotte Römer; Dominique Schaefer	1; 6	6; 4	6^{3} 7^{7}
3	(Ecuador) (Peru)	Rafaella Baquerizo / Charlotte Römer; Bianca Botto / Anastasia Iamachkine	6; 4	6; 0
