= Catalina Pella =

Argentine tennis player

- Country (sports): Argentina
- Born: 31 January 1993 (age 33) Argentina
- Plays: Right-handed (two-handed backhand)
- Prize money: $152,457

Singles
- Career record: 327–182
- Career titles: 11 ITF
- Highest ranking: No. 173 (7 November 2016)

Doubles
- Career record: 169–123
- Career titles: 11 ITF
- Highest ranking: No. 123 (23 October 2017)

Team competitions
- Fed Cup: 13–8
Medal record
Representing ARG
South American Games
Bronze medal – third place	2010 Medellín	Women's doubles

Catalina Pella (Spanish pronunciation: [kataˈlina ˈpela]; born 31 January 1993) is an Argentine former professional tennis player. Her brother Guido competed on the ATP World Tour.

In her career, Pella won eleven singles and eleven doubles titles on the ITF Women's Circuit. On 7 November 2016, she reached her best singles ranking of world No. 173. On 23 October 2017, she peaked at No. 123 in the WTA doubles rankings.

Playing for Argentina Fed Cup team, Pella has a win–loss record of 13–8.

== ITF Circuit finals ==
Legend
$100,000 tournaments
$80,000 tournaments
$60,000 tournaments
$25,000 tournaments
$15,000 tournaments
$10,000 tournaments

=== Singles: 25 (11 titles, 14 runner–ups) ===
Result	W–L	Date	Tournament	Tier	Surface	Opponent	Score
Loss	0–1	Oct 2010	ITF São Paulo, Brazil	10,000	Clay	(Brazil) Roxane Vaisemberg	6–7^{(7)}, 6–4, 4–6
Win	1–1	Feb 2011	ITF Buenos Aires, Argentina	10,000	Clay	(Argentina) Mailen Auroux	6–4, 2–6, 6–3
Loss	1–2	Mar 2011	ITF Santiago, Chile	10,000	Clay	(Argentina) Paula Ormaechea	2–6, 6–7^{(4)}
Loss	1–3	Mar 2011	ITF Rancagua, Chile	10,000	Clay	(Bulgaria) Aleksandrina Naydenova	6–3, 2–6, 2–6
Loss	1–4	Apr 2011	ITF Córdoba, Argentina	10,000	Hard	(Argentina) Andrea Benítez	3–6, 3–6
Loss	1–5	Jul 2012	ITF Gardone Val Trompia, Italy	10,000	Clay	(Colombia) Yuliana Lizarazo	5–7, 6–3, 4–6
Loss	1–6	Sep 2012	ITF Buenos Aires, Argentina	10,000	Clay	(Chile) Fernanda Brito	3–6, 6–0, 5–7
Win	2–6	Sep 2012	ITF Villa Allende, Argentina	10,000	Clay	(Chile) Camila Silva	3–6, 7–5, 7–6^{(4)}
Loss	2–7	Nov 2013	ITF Buenos Aires, Argentina	10,000	Clay	(Argentina) Vanesa Furlanetto	6–7^{(5)}, 6–3, 6–7^{(4)}
Win	3–7	Dec 2013	ITF São José dos Campos, Brazil	10,000	Clay	(Norway) Ulrikke Eikeri	6–3, 6–4
Loss	3–8	Dec 2013	ITF Mata de São João, Brazil	25,000	Clay	(Paraguay) Montserrat González	3–6, 1–6
Loss	3–9	Jul 2015	ITF Maaseik, Belgium	10,000	Clay	(Russia) Natela Dzalamidze	1–6, 7–5, 1–6
Win	4–9	Nov 2015	ITF Caracas, Venezuela	10,000	Hard	(Argentina) Julieta Estable	6–2, 6–3
Win	5–9	Nov 2015	ITF Caracas	10,000	Hard	(Argentina) Victoria Bosio	3–6, 6–4, 6–0
Loss	5–10	Nov 2015	ITF Santiago, Chile	10,000	Clay	(Chile) Daniela Seguel	2–6, 6–2, ret.
Loss	5–11	Jan 2016	ITF Bertioga, Brazil	25,000	Hard	(Romania) Sorana Cîrstea	1–6, 7–6^{(4)}, 3–6
Win	6–11	Mar 2016	ITF Curitiba, Brazil	25,000	Clay	(Netherlands) Cindy Burger	5–7, 6–4, 6–2
Win	7–11	May 2017	ITF Benavídez, Argentina	15,000	Hard	(Argentina) Stephanie Petit	6–4, 6–1
Win	8–11	Jan 2018	ITF Hammamet, Tunisia	15,000	Clay	(Italy) Michele Alexandra Zmău	6–4, 6–7^{(5)}, 6–4
Loss	8–12	Jun 2018	Open de Montpellier, France	25,000	Clay	(France) Fiona Ferro	4–6, 3–6
Loss	8–13	Sep 2018	ITF Buenos Aires, Argentina	15,000	Clay	(Chile) Fernanda Brito	1–6, 4–6
Win	9–13	Nov 2018	ITF Solarino, Italia	15,000	Carpet	(United Kingdom) Amanda Carreras	4–6, 6–3, 5–7
Win	10–13	Dec 2018	ITF Solarino	15,000	Carpet	(Italy) Federica Bilardo	6–1, 6–2
Loss	10–14	Dec 2018	ITF Solarino	15,000	Carpet	(France) Lou Adler	3–6, 4–6
Win	11–14	Jul 2019	ITF Lima, Peru	15,000	Clay	(Paraguay) Lara Escauriza	4–6, 6–3, 6–4

=== Doubles: 23 (11 titles, 12 runner-ups) ===
Result	W–L	Date	Tournament	Surface	Partner	Opponents	Score
Loss	0–1	Nov 2010	ITF Tandil, Argentina	Clay	(Argentina) Jordana Lujan	(Argentina) Lucia Jara Lozano (Argentina) Carla Lucero	6–4, 4–6, [3–10]
Loss	0–2	Feb 2011	ITF Buenos Aires, Argentina	Clay	(Chile) Fernanda Brito	(Paraguay) Verónica Cepede Royg (Argentina) Luciana Sarmenti	0–6, 3–6
Loss	0–3	Apr 2011	ITF Córdoba, Argentina	Hard	(Argentina) Luciana Sarmenti	(Argentina) Andrea Benítez (Argentina) Tatiana Búa	3–6, 4–6
Win	1.	Jul 2012	ITF Viserba, Italy	Clay	(Italy) Maria Masini	(Italy) Clelia Melena (Italy) Alice Moroni	6–1, 6–2
Win	2.	Sep 2012	ITF Villa Allende, Argentina	Clay	(Argentina) Victoria Bosio	(Argentina) Andrea Benítez (Argentina) Luciana Sarmenti	7–6^{(6)}, 6–7^{(3)}, [10–7]
Win	3.	Nov 2013	ITF Buenos Aires, Argentina	Clay	(Argentina) Sofía Luini	(Chile) Fernanda Brito (Uruguay) Carolina de los Santos	6–4, 6–4
Loss	4.	Jul 2015	ITF Horb, Germany	Clay	(Argentina) Guadalupe Pérez Rojas	(Germany) Carolin Daniels (Belarus) Lidziya Marozava	6–7^{(3)}, 6–4, [7–10]
Win	4.	Sep 2015	ITF San Carlos Centro, Argentina	Clay	(Bolivia) María Fernanda Álvarez	(Chile) Bárbara Gatica (Argentina) Stephanie Petit	6–2, 6–0
Loss	5.	Sep 2015	ITF Santa Fe, Argentina	Clay	(Chile) Daniela Seguel	(Bolivia) María Fernanda Álvarez (Brazil) Laura Pigossi	6–2, 2–6, [3–10]
Win	5.	Nov 2015	ITF Caracas, Venezuela	Hard	(Brazil) Laura Pigossi	(Romania) Jaqueline Cristian (Venezuela) Aymet Uzcátegui	5–7, 6–1, [10–4]
Win	6.	Nov 2015	ITF Caracas, Venezuela	Hard	(Brazil) Laura Pigossi	(Argentina) Julieta Estable (Argentina) Ana Victoria Gobbi Monllau	1–1 ret.
Loss	6.	Nov 2015	ITF Santiago, Chile	Clay	(Chile) Daniela Seguel	(Paraguay) Montserrat González (Mexico) Ana Sofía Sánchez	4–6, 6–7^{(3)}
Win	7.	Feb 2016	ITF São Paulo, Brazil	Clay	(Chile) Daniela Seguel	(United Kingdom) Tara Moore (Switzerland) Conny Perrin	6–3, 6–1
Win	8.	Mar 2016	ITF Curitiba, Brazil	Clay	(Chile) Daniela Seguel	(Italy) Martina Caregaro (Hungary) Réka Luca Jani	6–3, 7–6^{(5)}
Win	9.	Mar 2017	ITF São Paulo, Brazil	Clay	(Chile) Daniela Seguel	(Brazil) Gabriela Cé (Venezuela) Andrea Gámiz	7–5, 3–6, [10–5]
Win	10.	Apr 2017	Charlottesville Clay Court Classic, United States	Clay	(Serbia) Jovana Jakšić	(United States) Madison Brengle (United States) Danielle Collins	6–4, 7–6^{(5)}
Loss	7.	Jun 2017	ITF Padua, Italy	Clay	(Brazil) Gabriela Cé	(Italy) Cristiana Ferrando (Italy) Alice Matteucci	6–2, 0–6, [9–11]
Loss	8.	Jun 2017	ITF Lenzerheide, Switzerland	Clay	(Brazil) Gabriela Cé	(Switzerland) Amra Sadiković (Switzerland) Nina Stadler	6–2, 4–6, [1–10]
Loss	9.	Sep 2017	ITF Pula, Italy	Clay	(Brazil) Gabriela Cé	(Italy) Claudia Giovine (Croatia) Tereza Mrdeža	3–6, 1–6
Loss	10.	Jan 2018	ITF Hammamet, Tunisia	Clay	(Greece) Despina Papamichail	(Switzerland) Karin Kennel (Russia) Maria Marfutina	5–7, 2–6
Loss	11.	Sep 2018	ITF Buenos Aires, Argentina	Clay	(Argentina) Julieta Estable	(Chile) Fernanda Brito (Russia) Yuliia Sokolovskaya	5–7, 6–7^{(2)}
Win	11.	Nov 2018	ITF Solarino, Italia	Carpet	(Italy) Miriana Tona	(Russia) Ekaterina Reyngold (Paraguay) Camila Giangreco Campiz	6–4, 6–2
Loss	12.	Nov 2019	ITF Guatemala City	Hard	(South Africa) Warona Mdlulwa	(Guatemala) Melissa Morales (Guatemala) Kirsten-Andrea Weedon	3–6, 6–7^{(4)}

== National representation ==
Pella made her Fed Cup debut for Argentina in 2016, while the team was competing in the Americas Zone Group I, when she was 23 years and three days old.

=== Fed Cup (13–8) ===
Group membership
World Group Play-off
World Group II Play-off
Americas Group (13–8)

| class="col-break " style=" padding-left: 0.75em;" |

Matches by surface
Hard (3–3)
Clay (10–5)

Matches by type
Singles (6–6)
Doubles (7–2)

Matches by setting
Indoors (2–2)
Outdoors (11–6)

==== Singles (6–6) ====
Edition	Stage	Date	Location	Against	Surface	Opponent	W/L	Score
2016 Fed Cup; Americas Zone Group I	Promotional Play-off	6 February 2016	Santa Cruz, Bolivia	Paraguay	Clay	Camila Giangreco Campiz	W	6–0, 6–2
2017 Fed Cup; Americas Zone Group I	Pool B	6 February 2017	Metepec, Mexico	Chile	Hard	Daniela Seguel	L	3–6, 4–6
2017 Fed Cup; Americas Zone Group I	Pool B	7 February 2017	Metepec, Mexico	Colombia	Hard	Mariana Duque Mariño	W	1–6, 6–3, 7–6^{(7–1)}
2017 Fed Cup; Americas Zone Group I	Pool B	8 February 2017	Metepec, Mexico	Mexico	Hard	Renata Zarazúa	L	3–6, 0–6
2017 Fed Cup; Americas Zone Group I	Pool B	9 February 2017	Metepec, Mexico	Brazil	Hard	Teliana Pereira	L	6–3, 4–6, 2–6
2018 Fed Cup; Americas Zone Group I	Pool B	7 February 2018	Asunción, Paraguay	Guatemala	Clay	Kirsten-Andrea Weedon	W	6–0, 6–7^{(6–8)}, 6–2
2018 Fed Cup; Americas Zone Group I	Pool B	8 February 2018	Asunción, Paraguay	Venezuela	Clay	Andrea Gámiz	W	4–6, 6–0, 6–1
2018 Fed Cup; Americas Zone Group I	Pool B	9 February 2018	Asunción, Paraguay	Brazil	Clay	Beatriz Haddad Maia	L	2–6, 6–4, 4–6
2019 Fed Cup; Americas Zone Group I	Pool B	6 February 2019	Medellín, Colombia	Puerto Rico	Clay	Lauren Anzalotta Kynoch	W	6–3, 6–1
2019 Fed Cup; Americas Zone Group I	Pool B	7 February 2019	Medellín, Colombia	Chile	Clay	Fernanda Brito	L	4–6, 3–6
2019 Fed Cup; Americas Zone Group I	Pool B	8 February 2019	Medellín, Colombia	Brazil	Clay	Carolina Meligeni Alves	L	4–6, 4–6
2019 Fed Cup; Americas Zone Group I	Relegation Play-off	9 February 2019	Medellín, Colombia	Ecuador	Clay	Mell Reasco	W	7–5, 6–2

==== Doubles (7–2) ====
Edition	Stage	Date	Location	Against	Surface	Partner	Opponents	W/L	Score
2016 Fed Cup; Americas Zone Group I	Pool B	3 February 2016	Santa Cruz, Bolivia	Ecuador	Clay	María Irigoyen	Rafaella Baquerizo; Marie Elise Casares	W	6–0, 6–0
2016 Fed Cup; Americas Zone Group I	Pool B	4 February 2016	Santa Cruz, Bolivia	Peru	Clay	María Irigoyen	Bianca Botto; Dominique Schaefer	W	6–1, 6–1
2016 Fed Cup; Americas Zone Group I	Pool B	5 February 2016	Santa Cruz, Bolivia	Brazil	Clay	María Irigoyen	Paula Cristina Gonçalves; Beatriz Haddad Maia	W	6–3, 6–3
2017 Fed Cup; Americas Zone Group I	Pool B	8 February 2017	Metepec, Mexico	Ecuador	Hard	María Irigoyen	Giuliana Olmos; Renata Zarazúa	W	6–7^{(2–7)}, 7–5, 6–2
2017 Fed Cup; Americas Zone Group I	Pool B	9 February 2017	Metepec, Mexico	Brazil	Hard	María Irigoyen	Gabriela Cé; Teliana Pereira	W	6–2, 3–6, 6–3
2018 Fed Cup; Americas Zone Group I	Pool B	9 February 2018	Asunción, Paraguay	Brazil	Clay	María Irigoyen	Beatriz Haddad Maia; Luisa Stefani	L	1–6, 6–3, 2–6
2019 Fed Cup; Americas Zone Group I	Pool B	6 February 2019	Medellín, Colombia	Puerto Rico	Clay	Victoria Bosio	Lauren Anzalotta Kynoch; Monica Puig	W	6–7^{(5–7)}, 6–4, 6–1
2019 Fed Cup; Americas Zone Group I	Pool B	8 February 2019	Medellín, Colombia	Brazil	Clay	Jazmín Ortenzi	Beatriz Haddad Maia; Luisa Stefani	L	5–7, 3–6
2019 Fed Cup; Americas Zone Group I	Relegation Play-off	9 February 2019	Medellín, Colombia	Ecuador	Clay	Victoria Bosio	Mell Reasco; Charlotte Römer	W	6–1, 6–2
