= Paula Andrea Pérez =

Colombian tennis player (born 1996)

Paula Pérez
- Full name: Paula Andrea Pérez García
- Country (sports): Colombia
- Born: 10 January 1996 (age 30) Barranquilla, Colombia
- Height: 1.68 m (5 ft 6 in)
- Prize money: US$ 11,947

Singles
- Career record: 36–57
- Career titles: 0
- Highest ranking: No. 941 (6 October 2014)

Doubles
- Career record: 66–55
- Career titles: 4 ITF
- Highest ranking: No. 583 (3 November 2014)

Paula Andrea Pérez García (born 10 January 1996) is a Colombian former professional tennis player.

Pérez won four doubles titles on the ITF Women's Circuit. On 6 October 2014, she reached her best singles ranking of world No. 941. On 3 November 2014, she peaked at No. 583 in the WTA doubles rankings.

Pérez made her WTA Tour debut at the 2013 Copa Colsanitas, partnering her twin sister María Paulina in doubles. The twins lost their first-round match against the French duo of Alizé Cornet and Pauline Parmentier.

Playing for Colombia Fed Cup team, Pérez has a win–loss record of 1–0.

== ITF finals ==
=== Doubles: 11 (4 titles, 7 runner–ups) ===
Legend $50,000 tournaments $25,000 tournaments $15,000 tournaments $10,000 tournaments	Finals by surface Hard (0–3) Clay (4–4) Grass (0–0) Carpet (0–0)

Result	W–L	Date	Tournament	Tier	Surface	Partner	Opponents	Score
Loss	0–1	Nov 2012	ITF Barranquilla, Colombia	10,000	Clay	(Colombia) María Paulina Pérez	(United States) Nadia Echeverría Alam (United States) Blair Shankle	5–7, 6–7^{(1)}
Win	1–1	Dec 2013	ITF Barranquilla, Colombia	10,000	Clay	(Colombia) María Paulina Pérez	(Chile) Andrea Koch Benvenuto (United States) Daniella Roldan	6–1, 6–4
Loss	1–2	Jun 2014	ITF Coatzacoalcos, Mexico	10,000	Hard	(Colombia) María Paulina Pérez	(Mexico) Camila Fuentes (Mexico) Marcela Zacarías	2–6, 2–6
Win	2–2	Aug 2014	ITF Quito, Ecuador	10,000	Clay	(Colombia) María Paulina Pérez	(Brazil) Nathaly Kurata (Brazil) Eduarda Piai	7–5, 7–6^{(5)}
Loss	2–3	Oct 2014	ITF Lima, Peru	10,000	Clay	(Colombia) María Paulina Pérez	(Chile) Fernanda Brito (Brazil) Eduarda Piai	6–7^{(0)}, 4–6
Loss	2–4	Oct 2016	ITF Pereira, Colombia	10,000	Clay	(Colombia) María Paulina Pérez	(Chile) Fernanda Brito (Paraguay) Camila Giangreco Campiz	1–6, 2–6
Loss	2–5	Oct 2016	ITF Cúcuta, Colombia	10,000	Clay	(Colombia) María Paulina Pérez	(Chile) Bárbara Gatica (Chile) Daniela Macarena López	4–6, 6–4, [4–10]
Win	3–5	Jun 2017	ITF Hammamet, Tunisia	15,000	Clay	(Colombia) María Paulina Pérez	(Brazil) Nathaly Kurata (Brazil) Eduarda Piai	6–3, 6–3
Loss	3–6	Mar 2018	ITF Sharm El Sheikh, Egypt	15,000	Hard	(Colombia) María Paulina Pérez	(Georgia (country)) Mariam Bolkvadze (Czech Republic) Barbora Štefková	2–6, 6–7^{(6)}
Win	4–6	Nov 2018	ITF Cúcuta, Colombia	15,000	Clay	(Colombia) María Paulina Pérez	(Colombia) Ana Maria Becerra (Colombia) Daniela Carrillo	6–1, 6–1
Loss	4–7	Dec 2018	ITF Bogotá, Egypt	15,000	Hard	(Colombia) María Paulina Pérez	(United States) Allura Zamarripa (United States) Maribella Zamarripa	5–7, 4–6

== Fed Cup participation ==
=== Doubles ===
Edition	Stage	Date	Location	Against	Surface	Partner	Opponents	W/L	Score
2014	ZG1 R/R	6 Feb 2014	Lambaré, Paraguay	Ecuador	Clay	María Fernanda Herazo	Rafaella Baquerizo; Rafaela Gómez	W	6–1, 6–4
