= Rafaella Baquerizo =

Ecuadorian tennis player

- Country (sports): Ecuador
- Born: 25 March 1998 (age 26); Guayaquil, Ecuador
- College: Purdue (2016–18)

Singles

Grand Slam singles results
- US Open Junior: Q1 (2016)

Team competitions
- Fed Cup: 3–3
- Last updated on: 16 March 2020.

Rafaella Baquerizo (born 25 March 1998) is an Ecuadorian tennis player.

Playing for Ecuador at the Fed Cup, Baquerizo has a win–loss record of 3–3.

On the juniors tour, Baquerizo has a career high ITF junior combined ranking of 85, achieved on 24 February 2014.

She played tennis at Purdue University, between 2016 and 2018.

== ITF junior finals ==
Grand Slam
Category GA
Category G1
Category G2
Category G3
Category G4
Category G5

=== Singles (3–1) ===
Outcome	W–L	Date	Tournament	Grade	Surface	Opponent	Score
Winner	1–0	12 November 2012	Guayaquil, Ecuador	G5	Hard	(United States) Stephanie Nemtsova	6–3, 6–7^{(8–10)}, 6–3
Winner	2–0	9 November 2013	Santa Cruz, Bolivia	G3	Clay	(United Kingdom) Katie Swan	6–1, 6–3
Runner-up	2–1	31 October 2015	La Paz, Bolivia	G5	Clay	(Colombia) Yuliana Monroy	3–6, 6–7^{(7–9)}
Winner	3–1	21 November 2015	Guayaquil, Ecuador	G5	Hard	(United States) Jimena Rodriguez-Benito	6–4, 6–3

=== Doubles (9–7) ===
Outcome	W–L	Date	Tournament	Grade	Surface	Partner	Opponents	Score
Runner-up	0–1	29 September 2012	Quillota, Chile	G5	Clay	(Chile) Fernanda Astete	(Brazil) Luisa Rosa (Chile) Catalina Vives	1–6, 4–6
Runner-up	0–2	10 November 2012	Santa Cruz, Bolivia	G3	Clay	(Ecuador) Rafaela Gómez	(Bolivia) Nabila Farah (Bolivia) Noelia Zeballos	4–6, 1–6
Winner	1–2	24 November 2012	Guayaquil, Ecuador	G5	Hard	(Ecuador) Rafaela Gómez	(United States) Stephanie Nemtsova (Venezuela) Stephanie Rodríguez	6–4, 6–3
Winner	2–2	20 October 2013	Florianópolis, Brazil	G4	Clay	(Portugal) Ivone Álvaro	(Brazil) Maria Vitória Beirão (Portugal) Sofia Sualehe	6–1, 6–2
Runner-up	2–3	26 October 2013	Montevideo, Uruguay	G2	Clay	(Brazil) Leticia Garcia Vidal	(United States) Olivia Hauger (Mexico) Cassandra Vázquez	6–4, 3–6, [6–10]
Runner-up	2–4	19 January 2014	Caracas, Venezuela	G1	Hard	(Brazil) Luisa Stefani	(Russia) Anna Blinkova (United States) Jessica Ho	3–6, 3–6
Winner	3–4	26 January 2014	Barranquilla, Colombia	G1	Clay	(United States) Usue Maitane Arconada	(Romania) Jaqueline Cristian (United States) Dasha Ivanova	6–3, 6–3
Runner-up	3–5	1 February 2014	Guayaquil, Ecuador	G1	Clay	(Ecuador) Doménica González	(Brazil) Luisa Stefani (Mexico) Renata Zarazúa	1–6, 6–3, [7–10]
Runner-up	3–6	22 March 2014	San José, Costa Rica	G3	Hard	(United States) Madison Bourguignon	(United Kingdom) Anna Brogan (United States) Gabriella Pollner	w/o
Winner	4–6	6 April 2014	La Paz, Bolivia	B1	Clay	(Ecuador) Doménica González	(Argentina) Ornella Garavani (Brazil) Thaisa Grana Pedretti	6–3, 6–4
Winner	5–6	31 January 2015	Guayaquil, Ecuador	G1	Clay	(Romania) Jaqueline Cristian	(United States) Francesca Di Lorenzo (United States) Meghan Kelley	6–1, 6–4
Winner	6–6	31 October 2015	La Paz, Bolivia	G5	Clay	(Bolivia) Daniela Alejandra la Fuente Strassburger	(United States) Julia Goldberg (Colombia) Yuliana Monroy	6–0, 1–6, [15–13]
Winner	7–6	7 November 2015	Santa Cruz, Bolivia	G3	Clay	(Paraguay) Lara Escauriza	(Argentina) María Lourdes Carlé (Peru) Anastasia Iamachkine	6–2, 7–6^{(7–2)}
Winner	8–6	13 February 2016	La Paz, Bolivia	G2	Clay	(Ecuador) Camila Romero	(Japan) Anri Nagata (Japan) Yuki Naito	2–6, 6–4, [10–8]
Winner	9–6	26 March 2016	Mar del Plata, Argentina	B1	Clay	(Ecuador) Camila Romero	(Chile) Fernanda Labraña (Brazil) Nathalia Wolf Gasparin	6–4, 6–3
Runner-up	9–7	10 April 2016	Mendoza, Argentina	G3	Clay	(Chile) Fernanda Labraña	(Argentina) Melany Solange Krywoj (Argentina) Azul Agustina Pedemonti	3–6, 6–7^{(11–13)}

== National representation ==
=== Fed Cup ===
Baquerizo made her Fed Cup debut for Ecuador in 2014, while the team was competing in the Americas Zone Group I, when she was 15 years and 318 days old.

==== Fed Cup (3–3) ====
Group membership World Group (0–0) World Group Play-off (0–0) World Group II (0–0) World Group II Play-off (0–0) Europe/Africa Group (3–3)	Matches by surface Hard (0–0) Clay (3–3) Grass (0–0) Carpet (0–0)	Matches by type Singles (1–0) Doubles (2–3)	Matches by setting Indoors (0–0) Outdoors (3–3)

===== Singles (1–0) =====
Edition	Stage	Date	Location	Against	Surface	Opponent	W/L	Score
2016 Fed Cup; Americas Zone Group I	Pool B	5 February 2016	Santa Cruz, Bolivia	Peru	Clay	Anastasia Iamachkine	W	6–3, 6–1

===== Doubles (2–3) =====
Edition	Stage	Date	Location	Against	Surface	Partner	Opponents	W/L	Score
2014 Fed Cup; Americas Zone Group I	Pool B	6 February 2014	Lambaré, Paraguay	Colombia	Clay	Rafaela Gómez	María Herazo González; Paula Andrea Pérez	L	1–6, 4–6
2014 Fed Cup; Americas Zone Group I	Pool B	7 February 2014	Lambaré, Paraguay	(The Bahamas) Bahamas	Clay	Rafaela Gómez	Nikkita Fountain; Larika Russell	W	6–4, 6–2
2016 Fed Cup; Americas Zone Group I	Pool B	3 February 2016	Santa Cruz, Bolivia	Argentina	Clay	Marie Elise Casares	María Irigoyen; Catalina Pella	L	0–6, 0–6
2016 Fed Cup; Americas Zone Group I	Pool B	4 February 2016	Santa Cruz, Bolivia	Brazil	Clay	Charlotte Römer	Paula Cristina Gonçalves; Beatriz Haddad Maia	L	6–7^{(3–7)}, 3–6
2016 Fed Cup; Americas Zone Group I	Pool B	5 February 2016	Santa Cruz, Bolivia	Peru	Clay	Camila Romero	Bianca Botto; Anastasia Iamachkine	W	6–4, 6–0
