= 2014 Fed Cup Americas Zone Group I – Pool A =

International tennis competition

Pool A of the 2014 Fed Cup Americas Group I was one of two pools in the Americas Group I of the 2014 Fed Cup. Three teams competed in a round robin competition, with the top team and the bottom two teams proceeding to their respective sections of the play-offs: the top team played for advancement to the World Group II Play-offs, while the bottom team faced potential relegation to Group II.

== Standings ==
		(Paraguay) PAR	(Venezuela) VEN	(Mexico) MEX	RR; W–L	Set; W–L	Game; W–L	Standings
20	Paraguay		2–0	3–0	5–0	10–0	61–24	1
38	Venezuela	0–2		2–1	2–3	4–6	47–52	2
40	Mexico	0–3	1–2		1–5	2–10	38–70	3

== Round-robin ==
=== Venezuela vs. Mexico ===
Venezuela
2
Yacht y Golf Club Paraguayo, Lambaré, Paraguay
5 February 2014
Clay

Mexico
1

			1	2	3
1	(Venezuela) (Mexico)	Andrea Gámiz; Ximena Hermoso	6^{5} 7^{7}	3; 6
2	(Venezuela) (Mexico)	Adriana Pérez; Ana Sofía Sánchez	6; 4	6; 1
3	(Venezuela) (Mexico)	Andrea Gámiz / Adriana Pérez; Victoria Rodríguez / Marcela Zacarías	7; 5	6; 4

=== Paraguay vs. Mexico ===
Paraguay
3
Yacht y Golf Club Paraguayo, Lambaré, Paraguay
6 February 2014
Clay

Mexico
0

			1	2	3
1	(Paraguay) (Mexico)	Montserrat González; Marcela Zacarías	6; 3	6; 0
2	(Paraguay) (Mexico)	Verónica Cepede Royg; Ana Sofía Sánchez	6; 3	6; 2
3	(Paraguay) (Mexico)	Verónica Cepede Royg / Montserrat González; Ximena Hermoso / Victoria Rodríguez	6; 0	6; 3

=== Paraguay vs. Venezuela ===
Paraguay
2
Yacht y Golf Club Paraguayo, Lambaré, Paraguay
7 February 2014
Clay

Venezuela
0

			1	2	3
1	(Paraguay) (Venezuela)	Montserrat González; Andrea Gámiz	7; 5	6; 3
2	(Paraguay) (Venezuela)	Verónica Cepede Royg; Adriana Pérez	6; 1	6; 4
3	(Paraguay) (Venezuela)	Verónica Cepede Royg / Montserrat González; Andrea Gámiz / Adriana Pérez	6; 2			not completed
