= 2014 Fed Cup Americas Zone Group II – Pool B =

Pool B of the 2014 Fed Cup Americas Group II was one of four pools in the Americas Group II of the 2014 Fed Cup. Three teams competed in a round robin competition, with the top team and the bottom two teams proceeding to their respective sections of the play-offs: the top team played for advancement to the Group I.

== Standings ==
	(Chile) CHI	(Puerto Rico) PUR	(Barbados) BAR	RR; W–L	Set; W–L	Game; W–L	Standings
Chile		2–1	3–0	5–1	10–4	70–43	1
Puerto Rico	1–2		3–0	4–2	10–4	76–43	2
Barbados	0–3	0–3		0–6	0–12	16–72	3

== Round-robin ==
=== Puerto Rico vs. Barbados ===
Puerto Rico
3
Palmas Athletic Club, Humacao, Puerto Rico
9 April 2014
Hard (outdoors)

Barbados
0

			1	2	3
1	(Puerto Rico) (Barbados)	Yolimar Ogando; Kiana Marshall	6; 2	6; 1
2	(Puerto Rico) (Barbados)	Monica Puig; Ancia Ifill	6; 2	6; 1
3	(Puerto Rico) (Barbados)	Yolimar Ogando / Monica Puig; Cherise Slocombe / Melena López	6; 1	6; 2

=== Chile vs. Barbados ===
Chile
3
Palmas Athletic Club, Humacao, Puerto Rico
10 April 2014
Hard (outdoors)

Barbados
0

			1	2	3
1	(Chile) (Barbados)	Andrea Koch Benvenuto; Kiana Marshall	6; 1	6; 3
2	(Chile) (Barbados)	Daniela Seguel; Melena López	6; 0	6; 0
3	(Chile) (Barbados)	Fernanda Brito / Cecilia Costa Melgar; Ancia Ifill / Cherise Slocombe	6; 1	6; 2

=== Chile vs. Puerto Rico ===
Chile
2
Palmas Athletic Club, Humacao, Puerto Rico
11 April 2014
Hard (outdoors)

Puerto Rico
1

			1	2	3
1	(Chile) (Puerto Rico)	Andrea Koch Benvenuto; Yolimar Ogando	7^{7} 6^{4}	1; 6	6; 2
2	(Chile) (Puerto Rico)	Daniela Seguel; Monica Puig	6; 1	6; 3
3	(Chile) (Puerto Rico)	Cecilia Costa Melgar / Daniela Seguel; Monica Puig / Ariana Rodríguez	4; 6	6; 4	6; 4
