= 2014 Fed Cup Asia/Oceania Zone Group I – Pool B =

Pool B of the 2014 Fed Cup Asia/Oceania Group I was one of two pools in the Asia/Oceania Group I of the 2014 Fed Cup. Three teams competed in a round robin competition, with the top team and the bottom two teams proceeding to their respective sections of the play-offs: the top team played for advancement to the World Group II Play-offs, while the bottom team faced potential relegation to Group II.

== Standings ==
		(China) CHN	(Uzbekistan) UZB	(South Korea) KOR	(Chinese Taipei) TPE	RR; W–L	Set; W–L	Game; W–L	Standings	
24	China		1–2	3–0	3–0	2–1	7–2	14–5	102–67	2
33	Uzbekistan	2–1		2–1	3–0	3–0	7–2	14–7	105–82	1
42	South Korea	0–3	1–2		3–0	1–2	4–5	10–11	95–91	3
37	Chinese Taipei	0–3	0–3	0–3		0–3	0–9	3–18	62–124	4

== Round-robin ==
=== China vs. Uzbekistan ===
China
1
National Tennis Centre, Astana, Kazakhstan
5 February 2014
Hard (indoors)

Uzbekistan
2

			1	2	3
1	(China) (Uzbekistan)	Liu Fangzhou; Sabina Sharipova	4; 6	2; 6
2	(China) (Uzbekistan)	Wang Qiang; Nigina Abduraimova	7^{7} 6^{3}	6; 3
3	(China) (Uzbekistan)	Liu Fangzhou / Zhang Shuai; Nigina Abduraimova / Sabina Sharipova	1; 6	4; 6

=== South Korea vs. Chinese Taipei ===
South Korea
3
National Tennis Centre, Astana, Kazakhstan
5 February 2014
Hard (indoors)

Chinese Taipei
0

			1	2	3
1	(South Korea) (Chinese Taipei)	Yoo Mi; Yang Chia-hsien	6; 4	6; 2
2	(South Korea) (Chinese Taipei)	Jang Su-jeong; Chan Chin-wei	6; 1	6^{6} 7^{8}	7; 5
3	(South Korea) (Chinese Taipei)	Han Na-lae / Lee So-ra; Lee Ya-hsuan / Yang Chia-hsien	6; 2	6; 1

=== China vs. South Korea ===
China
3
National Tennis Centre, Astana, Kazakhstan
6 February 2014
Hard (indoors)

South Korea
0

			1	2	3
1	(China) (South Korea)	Liu Fangzhou; Han Na-lae	6; 3	4; 6	6; 4
2	(China) (South Korea)	Wang Qiang; Lee So-ra	6; 2	7; 5
3	(China) (South Korea)	Peng Shuai / Zhang Shuai; Han Na-lae / Yoo Mi	6; 4	6; 0

=== Uzbekistan vs. Chinese Taipei ===
Uzbekistan
3
National Tennis Centre, Astana, Kazakhstan
6 February 2014
Hard (indoors)

Chinese Taipei
0

			1	2	3
1	(Uzbekistan) (Chinese Taipei)	Sabina Sharipova; Yang Chia-hsien	7^{7} 6^{1}	6; 4
2	(Uzbekistan) (Chinese Taipei)	Nigina Abduraimova; Chan Chin-wei	3; 6	6; 2	6; 3
3	(Uzbekistan) (Chinese Taipei)	Nigina Abduraimova / Arina Folts; Chan Chin-wei / Juan Ting-fei	6; 0	4; 6	6; 4

=== China vs. Chinese Taipei ===
China
3
National Tennis Centre, Astana, Kazakhstan
7 February 2014
Hard (indoors)

Chinese Taipei
0

			1	2	3
1	(China) (Chinese Taipei)	Wang Qiang; Yang Chia-hsien	6; 1	7; 5
2	(China) (Chinese Taipei)	Zhang Shuai; Juan Ting-fei	6; 0	6; 0
3	(China) (Chinese Taipei)	Wang Qiang / Zhang Shuai; Juan Ting-fei / Lee Ya-hsuan	6; 2	6; 2

=== Uzbekistan vs. South Korea ===
Uzbekistan
2
National Tennis Centre, Astana, Kazakhstan
7 February 2014
Hard (indoors)

South Korea
1

			1	2	3
1	(Uzbekistan) (South Korea)	Sabina Sharipova; Lee So-ra	6; 1	6; 1
2	(Uzbekistan) (South Korea)	Nigina Abduraimova; Jang Su-jeong	1; 6	7; 5	6; 3
3	(Uzbekistan) (South Korea)	Alina Abdurakhimova / Arina Folts; Han Na-lae / Yoo Mi	2; 6	0; 6
