= 2016 Fed Cup Americas Zone Group I – play-offs =

Tennis competition stage

The play-offs of the 2016 Fed Cup Americas Zone Group I were the final stages of the Group I Zonal Competition involving teams from the Americas. Using the positions determined in their pools, the eight teams faced off to determine their placing in the 2016 Fed Cup Americas Zone Group I. The winner of the promotion play-off advanced to World Group II play-offs, and the losers of the relegation play-off were relegated down to the Americas Zone Group II.

== Pool results ==
Placing	Pool A	Pool B
1	Paraguay	Argentina
2	Mexico	Brazil
3	Bolivia	Peru
4	Colombia	Ecuador

== Promotion play-off ==
The first placed teams of the two pools were drawn in head-to-head rounds. The winner advanced to the World Group II play-offs.

=== Paraguay vs. Argentina ===
Paraguay
0
Country Club Las Palmas, Santa Cruz, Bolivia
6 February 2016
Clay (outdoor)

Argentina
2

			1	2	3
1	(Paraguay) (Argentina)	Camila Giangreco Campiz; Catalina Pella	0; 6	2; 6
2	(Paraguay) (Argentina)	Montserrat González; Nadia Podoroska	4; 6	3; 6
3	(Paraguay) (Argentina)	Camila Giangreco Campiz / Montserrat González; María Irigoyen / Catalina Pella				not played

== Third place play-off ==
The runner-up teams of the two pools were drawn in head-to-head to determine the third and fourth placings.

=== Mexico vs. Brazil ===
Mexico
0
Country Club Las Palmas, Santa Cruz, Bolivia
6 February 2016
Clay (outdoor)

Brazil
2

			1	2	3
1	(Mexico) (Brazil)	Renata Zarazúa; Paula Cristina Gonçalves	3; 6	2; 6
2	(Mexico) (Brazil)	Ana Sofía Sánchez; Gabriela Cé	1; 6	0; 3		retired
3	(Mexico) (Brazil)	Victoria Rodríguez / Renata Zarazúa; Paula Cristina Gonçalves / Beatriz Haddad Maia				not played

== Relegation play-offs ==
The bottom two teams of the two pools were drawn in head-to-head. The loser was relegated down to Americas Zone Group II in 2016.

=== Bolivia vs. Peru ===
Bolivia
2
Country Club Las Palmas, Santa Cruz, Bolivia
6 February 2016
Clay (outdoor)

Peru
0

			1	2	3
1	(Bolivia) (Peru)	Noelia Zeballos; Anastasia Iamachkine	4; 6	7; 5	6; 1
2	(Bolivia) (Peru)	María Fernanda Álvarez Terán; Dominique Schaefer	6; 3	6; 4
3	(Bolivia) (Peru)	María Fernanda Álvarez Terán / Noelia Zeballos; Anastasia Iamachkine / Dominique Schaefer				not played

=== Colombia vs. Ecuador ===
Colombia
2
Country Club Las Palmas, Santa Cruz, Bolivia
6 February 2016
Clay (outdoor)

Ecuador
0

			1	2	3
1	(Colombia) (Ecuador)	Camila Osorio; Marie Elise Casares	6; 4	6; 2
2	(Colombia) (Ecuador)	Emiliana Arango; Camila Romero	6; 3	6; 2
3	(Colombia) (Ecuador)	María Fernanda Herazo / María Paulina Pérez; Rafaella Baquerizo / Camila Romero				not played

== Final placements ==
Placing	Teams	
Promoted	Argentina	
Second	Paraguay	
Third	Brazil	
Fourth	Mexico	
Fifth	Bolivia	Colombia
Relegated	Peru	Ecuador

- Argentina advanced to World Group II play-offs.
- Peru and Ecuador were relegated to Americas Zone Group II in 2017.
