= 2014 Fed Cup Americas Zone Group II – Pool C =

Pool C of the 2014 Fed Cup Americas Group II was one of four pools in the Americas Group II of the 2014 Fed Cup. Three teams competed in a round robin competition, with the top team and the bottom two teams proceeding to their respective sections of the play-offs: the top team played for advancement to the Group I.

== Standings ==
	(Peru) PER	(Bolivia) BOL	(Bermuda) BER	RR; W–L	Set; W–L	Game; W–L	Standings
Peru		1–2	3–0	4–2	8–4	59–44	2
Bolivia	2–1		2–1	4–2	8–4	61–37	1
Bermuda	0–3	1–2		1–5	2–10	27–66	3

== Round-robin ==
=== Peru vs. Bermuda ===
Peru
3
Palmas Athletic Club, Humacao, Puerto Rico
9 April 2014
Hard (outdoors)

Bermuda
0

			1	2	3
1	(Peru) (Bermuda)	Camila Vargas Gómez; Jacklyn Lambert	6; 0	6; 0
2	(Peru) (Bermuda)	Patricia Kú Flores; Tyler Smith	6; 2	6; 1
3	(Peru) (Bermuda)	María Paula Torres / Camila Vargas Gómez; Tara Lambert / Tyler Smith	7^{7} 6^{4}	6; 3

=== Bolivia vs. Bermuda ===
Bolivia
2
Palmas Athletic Club, Humacao, Puerto Rico
10 April 2014
Hard (outdoors)

Bermuda
1

			1	2	3
1	(Bolivia) (Bermuda)	Daniela Ruiz; Jacklyn Lambert	6; 0	6; 0
2	(Bolivia) (Bermuda)	María Fernanda Álvarez Terán; Tyler Smith	6; 1	6; 2
3	(Bolivia) (Bermuda)	Hortência Birnbaumer / Anelisse Torrico; Jacklyn Lambert / Tara Lambert	2; 6	3; 6

=== Peru vs. Bolivia ===
Peru
1
Palmas Athletic Club, Humacao, Puerto Rico
11 April 2014
Hard (outdoors)

Bolivia
2

			1	2	3
1	(Peru) (Bolivia)	Patricia Kú Flores; Daniela Ruiz	6; 2	6; 4
2	(Peru) (Bolivia)	Bianca Botto; María Fernanda Álvarez Terán	5; 7	0; 1		retired
3	(Peru) (Bolivia)	Bianca Botto / Camila Vargas Gómez; María Fernanda Álvarez Terán / Daniela Ruiz	5; 7	0; 6
