= 2019 Fed Cup Americas Zone Group I – play-offs =

Subsection of tennis competition

The play-offs of the 2019 Fed Cup Americas Zone Group I were the final stages of the Group I Zonal Competition involving teams from the Americas. Using the positions determined in their pools, the eight teams faced off to determine their placing in the 2019 Fed Cup Americas Zone Group I. The winner of the promotion play-off advanced to World Group II play-offs, and the losers of the relegation play-off were relegated down to the Americas Zone Group II in 2020.

== Pool results ==
Placing	Pool A	Pool B
1	Paraguay	Brazil
2	Mexico	Chile
3	Colombia	Argentina
4	Ecuador	Puerto Rico

== Promotion play-off ==
The first placed teams of the two pools were drawn in head-to-head rounds. The winner advanced to the World Group II play-offs.

=== Paraguay vs. Brazil ===
Paraguay
0
Club Campestre Sede Llanogrande, Medellín, Colombia
9 February
Clay

Brazil
2

			1	2	3
1	(Paraguay) (Brazil)	Montserrat González; Carolina Alves	3; 6	2; 6
2	(Paraguay) (Brazil)	Verónica Cepede Royg; Beatriz Haddad Maia	2; 6	3; 6
3	(Paraguay) (Brazil)	Verónica Cepede Royg / Montserrat González; Beatriz Haddad Maia / Luisa Stefani				not played

== Third place play-off ==
The runner-up teams of the two pools were drawn in head-to-head to determine the third and fourth placings.

=== Mexico vs. Chile ===
Mexico
1
Club Campestre Sede Llanogrande, Medellín, Colombia
9 February
Clay

Chile
2

			1	2	3
1	(Mexico) (Chile)	María José Portillo Ramírez; Alexa Guarachi	3; 6	5; 7
2	(Mexico) (Chile)	Renata Zarazúa; Daniela Seguel	2; 6	6; 3	6; 2
3	(Mexico) (Chile)	Giuliana Olmos / Renata Zarazúa; Bárbara Gatica / Alexa Guarachi	3; 6	3; 6

== Relegation play-offs ==
The bottom two team of the pools were drawn in head-to-head. The losers were relegated down to Americas Zone Group II in 2020.

=== Colombia vs. Puerto Rico ===
Colombia
2
Club Campestre Sede Llanogrande, Medellín, Colombia
9 February
Clay

Puerto Rico
1

			1	2	3
1	(Colombia) (Puerto Rico)	Camila Osorio; Lauren Anzalotta Kynoch	7; 5	6^{3} 7^{7}	6; 2
2	(Colombia) (Puerto Rico)	María Fernanda Herazo; Monica Puig	6^{5} 7^{7}	3; 6
3	(Colombia) (Puerto Rico)	María Fernanda Herazo / Camila Osorio; Lauren Anzalotta Kynoch / Monica Puig	6; 1	6; 3

=== Ecuador vs. Argentina ===
Ecuador
1
Club Campestre Sede Llanogrande, Medellín, Colombia
9 February
Clay

Argentina
2

			1	2	3
1	(Ecuador) (Argentina)	Mell Elizabeth Reasco González; Catalina Pella	5; 7	2; 6
2	(Ecuador) (Argentina)	Charlotte Römer; Victoria Bosio	0; 6	7; 5	7^{7} 6^{1}
3	(Ecuador) (Argentina)	Mell Elizabeth Reasco González / Charlotte Römer; Victoria Bosio / Catalina Pella	1; 6	2; 6

== Final placements ==
Placing	Teams	
Promoted/First	Brazil	
Second	Paraguay	
Third	Chile	
Fourth	Mexico	
Fifth	Colombia	Argentina
Relegated/Sixth	Puerto Rico	Ecuador

- Brazil was promoted to the 2019 Fed Cup World Group II play-offs.
- Puerto Rico and Ecuador were relegated to Americas Zone Group II in 2020.
