= 2014 Fed Cup Americas Zone Group II – Pool D =

Pool D of the 2014 Fed Cup Americas Group II was one of four pools in the Americas Group II of the 2014 Fed Cup. Three teams competed in a round robin competition, with the top team and the bottom two teams proceeding to their respective sections of the play-offs: the top team played for advancement to the Group I.

== Standings ==
	(Uruguay) URU	(Trinidad and Tobago) TRI	(Costa Rica) CRC	RR; W–L	Set; W–L	Game; W–L	Standings
Uruguay		2–0	3–0	2–4	5–8	59–64	3
Trinidad and Tobago	0–2		2–1	3–3	7–6	54–58	2
Costa Rica	0–3	1–2		4–2	8–6	67–58	1

== Round-robin ==
=== Uruguay vs. Costa Rica ===
Uruguay
1
Palmas Athletic Club, Humacao, Puerto Rico
9 April 2014
Hard (outdoors)

Costa Rica
2

			1	2	3
1	(Uruguay) (Costa Rica)	Magdalena Boado; Juli Raventós	2; 6	3; 6
2	(Uruguay) (Costa Rica)	Carolina de los Santos; Ariana Rahmanparast	7; 5	6; 2
3	(Uruguay) (Costa Rica)	Magdalena Boado / Carolina de los Santos; Andrea Brenes / Juli Raventós	6^{5} 7^{7}	6; 2	4; 6

=== Uruguay vs. Trinidad and Tobago ===
Uruguay
1
Palmas Athletic Club, Humacao, Puerto Rico
10 April 2014
Hard (outdoors)

Trinidad and Tobago
2

			1	2	3
1	(Uruguay) (Trinidad and Tobago)	Magdalena Boado; Anneliese Rose	6; 1	6; 4
2	(Uruguay) (Trinidad and Tobago)	Carolina de los Santos; Olivia Bennett	4; 6	3; 6
3	(Uruguay) (Trinidad and Tobago)	Magdalena Boado / Inés Canepa; Olivia Bennett / Anneliese Rose	5; 7	1; 6

=== Trinidad and Tobago vs. Costa Rica ===
Trinidad and Tobago
1
Palmas Athletic Club, Humacao, Puerto Rico
11 April 2014
Hard (outdoors)

Costa Rica
2

			1	2	3
1	(Trinidad and Tobago) (Costa Rica)	Anneliese Rose; Juli Raventós	6; 2	6; 4
2	(Trinidad and Tobago) (Costa Rica)	Olivia Bennett; Ariana Rahmanparast	1; 6	2; 6
3	(Trinidad and Tobago) (Costa Rica)	Olivia Bennett / Anneliese Rose; Andrea Brenes / Ariana Rahmanparast	3; 6	6; 3	0; 6
