= 2014 Fed Cup Americas Zone Group II – Pool A =

Pool A of the 2014 Fed Cup Americas Group II was one of four pools in the Americas Group II of the 2014 Fed Cup. Three teams competed in a round robin competition, with the top team and the bottom two teams proceeding to their respective sections of the play-offs: the top team played for advancement to the Group I.

== Standings ==
	(Guatemala) GUA	(Dominican Republic) DOM	(Panama) PAN	RR; W–L	Set; W–L	Game; W–L	Standings
Guatemala		2–0	3–0	4–2	8–5	54–50	2
Dominican Republic	0–2		2–1	5–1	10–2	67–20	1
Panama	0–3	1–2		0–6	1–12	23–74	3

== Round-robin ==
=== Dominican Republic vs. Panama ===
Dominican Republic
3
Palmas Athletic Club, Humacao, Puerto Rico
9 April 2014
Hard (outdoors)

Panama
0

			1	2	3
1	(Dominican Republic) (Panama)	Michelle Marie Valdez; Daniela Diez	6; 1	6; 1
2	(Dominican Republic) (Panama)	Francesca Segarelli; Karla Contreras	6; 1	6; 0
3	(Dominican Republic) (Panama)	Glenny Cepeda / Karla Portalatin; Daniela Diez / Gabriela González	6; 0	6; 1

=== Guatemala vs. Panama ===
Guatemala
3
Palmas Athletic Club, Humacao, Puerto Rico
10 April 2014
Hard (outdoors)

Panama
0

			1	2	3
1	(Guatemala) (Panama)	Kirsten-Andrea Weedon; Gabriela González	6; 1	6; 3
2	(Guatemala) (Panama)	Camila Ramazzini; Karla Contreras	6; 0	7^{7} 6^{5}
3	(Guatemala) (Panama)	Camila Ramazzini / Rebeca Reyes; Karla Contreras / Daniela Diez	1; 6	6; 2	6; 1

=== Guatemala vs. Dominican Republic ===
Guatemala
1
Palmas Athletic Club, Humacao, Puerto Rico
11 April 2014
Hard (outdoors)

Dominican Republic
2

			1	2	3
1	(Guatemala) (Dominican Republic)	Kirsten-Andrea Weedon; Michelle Marie Valdez	7; 5	6; 2
2	(Guatemala) (Dominican Republic)	Camila Ramazzini; Francesca Segarelli	1; 6	0; 6
3	(Guatemala) (Dominican Republic)	Camila Ramazzini / Kirsten-Andrea Weedon; Glenny Cepeda / Francesca Segarelli	1; 6	1; 6
