= 2014 Fed Cup =

International women's tennis competition

Details
- Duration: 8 February – 9 November
- Edition: 52nd

Achievements (singles)

The 2014 Fed Cup (also known as the 2014 Fed Cup by BNP Paribas for sponsorship purposes) was the 52nd edition of the most important tournament between national teams in women's tennis. The final took place on 8–9 November and was won by the Czech Republic. Petra Kvitová won both of her singles matches in the final against Germany, delivering two of the three points needed for victory of her team.

The draw took place on 10 July 2013 in Paris, France.

== World Group ==
Participating teams
| Australia | Czech Republic | Germany | Italy |
| Russia | Slovakia | Spain | United States |

=== Draw ===
Quarterfinals; 8–9 February
Cleveland, United States (indoor hard)
1 | Italy | 3
United States | 1
Seville, Spain (outdoor clay)
Spain | 2
3 | Czech Republic | 3
Bratislava, Slovakia (indoor hard)
4 | Slovakia | 1
Germany | 3
Hobart, Australia (outdoor hard)
Australia | 4
2 | Russia | 0

Semifinals; 19–20 April
Ostrava, Czech Republic (indoor hard)
1 | Italy | 0
3 | Czech Republic | 4
Brisbane, Australia (outdoor hard)
Germany | 3
Australia | 1

Final; 8–9 November
Prague, Czech Republic (indoor hard)
3 | Czech Republic | 3
Germany | 1

== World Group II ==
The World Group II was the second highest level of Fed Cup competition in 2014. Winners advanced to the World Group play-offs, and losers played in the World Group II play-offs.

Dates: 8–9 February

Results:

| Venue | Surface | Home team | Score | Visiting team |
|---|---|---|---|---|
| Montreal, Canada | Hard (i) | Canada | 3–1 | Serbia (1) |
| Borås, Sweden | Hard (i) | Sweden (3) | 2–3 | Poland |
| Paris, France | Hard (i) | France | 3–2 | Switzerland (4) |
| Buenos Aires, Argentina | Clay | Argentina | 3–1 | Japan (2) |

== World Group play-offs ==
The four losing teams in the World Group first round ties, and four winners of the World Group II ties entered the draw for the World Group play-offs. Four seeded teams, based on the latest Fed Cup ranking, were drawn against four unseeded teams.

Dates: 19–20 April

Results:

| Venue | Surface | Home team | Score | Visiting team |
|---|---|---|---|---|
| Adler Arena Skating Center, Sochi, Russia | Clay (i) | Russia (1) | 4–0 | Argentina |
| PEPS, Quebec City, Canada | Hard (i) | Canada | 3–1 | Slovakia (2) |
| Chaifetz Arena, St. Louis, United States | Hard (i) | United States (3) | 2–3 | France |
| Barcelona Tennis Olimpic, Barcelona, Spain | Clay | Spain (4) | 2–3 | Poland |

Russia remained in the World Group in 2015.
Canada, France and Poland were promoted to the World Group in 2015.
Argentina remained in World Group II in 2015.
Slovakia, Spain and United States were relegated to World Group II in 2015.

== World Group II play-offs ==
The four losing teams from World Group II played off against qualifiers from Zonal Group I. Two teams qualified from Europe/Africa Zone, one team from the Asia/Oceania Zone, and one team from the Americas Zone.

Dates: 19–20 April

Results:

| Venue | Surface | Home team | Score | Visiting team |
|---|---|---|---|---|
| Arenele BNR, Bucharest, Romania | Clay | Romania | 4–1 | Serbia (1) |
| Maaspoort Sports and Events, 's-Hertogenbosch, Netherlands | Clay (i) | Netherlands | 3–2 | Japan (2) |
| Sparbanken Lidköping Arena, Lidköping, Sweden | Hard (i) | Sweden (3) | 4–0 | Thailand |
| Clube de Tênis Catanduva, Catanduva, Brazil | Clay | Brazil | 1–4 | Switzerland (4) |

Sweden and Switzerland remained in World Group II in 2015.
Netherlands and Romania were promoted to World Group II in 2015.
Brazil and Thailand remained in Zonal Group I in 2015.
Japan and Serbia were relegated to Zonal Group I in 2015.

== Americas Zone ==
- Nations in **bold** advanced to the higher level of competition.
- Nations in italics were relegated down to a lower level of competition.

=== Group I ===
Venue: Yacht y Golf Club Paraguayo, Lambaré, Paraguay (outdoor clay)

Dates: Week commencing 3 February

Participating teams

==== Pool A ====
- Mexico
- Paraguay
- Venezuela

==== Pool B ====
- Bahamas
- **Brazil**
- Colombia
- Ecuador

==== Play-offs ====
- **Brazil** advanced to World Group II play-offs.
- Ecuador and Bahamas were relegated to Americas Zone Group II in 2015.

=== Group II ===
Venue: Palmas Athletic Club, Humacao, Puerto Rico (outdoor hard)

Dates: 7–12 April

Participating teams

==== Pool A ====
- Dominican Republic
- Guatemala
- Panama

==== Pool B ====
- **Chile**
- Puerto Rico
- Barbados

==== Pool C ====
- **Bolivia**
- Peru
- Bermuda

==== Pool D ====
- Costa Rica
- Trinidad and Tobago
- Uruguay

==== Play-offs ====
- **Bolivia** and **Chile** were promoted to Americas Zone Group I in 2015

== Asia/Oceania Zone ==
- Nations in **bold** advanced to the higher level of competition.
- Nations in italics were relegated down to a lower level of competition.

=== Group I ===
Venue: National Tennis Centre, Astana, Kazakhstan (indoor hard)

Dates: Week commencing 3 February

Participating teams

==== Pool A ====
- Indonesia
- Kazakhstan
- **Thailand**

==== Pool B ====
- China
- Chinese Taipei
- South Korea
- Uzbekistan

==== Play-offs ====
- **Thailand** advanced to World Group II play-offs
- Indonesia was relegated to Asia/Oceania Zone Group II in 2015

=== Group II ===
Venue: National Tennis Centre, Astana, Kazakhstan (Indoor hard)

Dates: Week commencing 3 February

Participating teams

==== Pool A ====
- **Hong Kong**
- Malaysia
- Vietnam

==== Pool B ====
- Philippines
- Singapore
- Sri Lanka

==== Pool C ====
- Iraq
- Kyrgyzstan
- Turkmenistan

==== Pool D ====
- India
- Iran
- New Zealand
- Pakistan

==== Play-offs ====
- **Hong Kong** was promoted to Asia/Oceania Group I in 2015

== Europe/Africa Zone ==
- Nations in **bold** advanced to the higher level of competition.
- Nations in italics were relegated down to a lower level of competition.

=== Group I ===
Venue: Syma Sport and Events Centre, Budapest, Hungary (indoor hard)

Dates: Week commencing 3 February

Participating teams

==== Pool A ====
- Belgium
- Croatia
- Luxembourg
- **Netherlands**

==== Pool B ====
- Great Britain
- Hungary
- Latvia
- **Romania**

==== Pool C ====
- Austria
- Israel
- Slovenia
- Ukraine

==== Pool D ====
- Belarus
- Bulgaria
- Portugal
- Turkey

Remaining team

- Tunisia

==== Play-offs ====
- **Netherlands** and **Romania** advanced to World Group II play-offs.
- Luxembourg and Slovenia were relegated to Europe/Africa Group II in 2015.

=== Group II ===
Venue: Šiauliai Tennis School, Šiauliai, Lithuania (indoor hard)

Dates: 16–19 April 2014

Participating teams

==== Pool A ====
- Finland
- Lithuania'
- Montenegro'
- **Liechtenstein**

==== Pool B ====
- South Africa
- Bosnia and Herzegovina
- **Georgia**
- Egypt

==== Play-offs ====
- **Georgia** and **Liechtenstein** were promoted to Europe/Africa Group I in 2015.
- Lithuania and Montenegro were relegated to Europe/Africa Group III in 2015.

=== Group III ===
Venue: Tere Tennis Center, Tallinn, Estonia (indoor hard)

Dates: 5–8 February 2014

Participating teams

==== Pool A ====
- Armenia
- **Estonia**
- Namibia

==== Pool B ====
- Cyprus
- Greece
- Moldova

==== Pool C ====
- Denmark
- Madagascar
- Norway

==== Pool D ====
- Iceland
- **Ireland**
- Malta

==== Play-offs ====
- **Estonia** and **Ireland** were promoted to Europe/Africa Group II in 2015.
