= Rafaela Gómez =

Ecuadorian tennis player

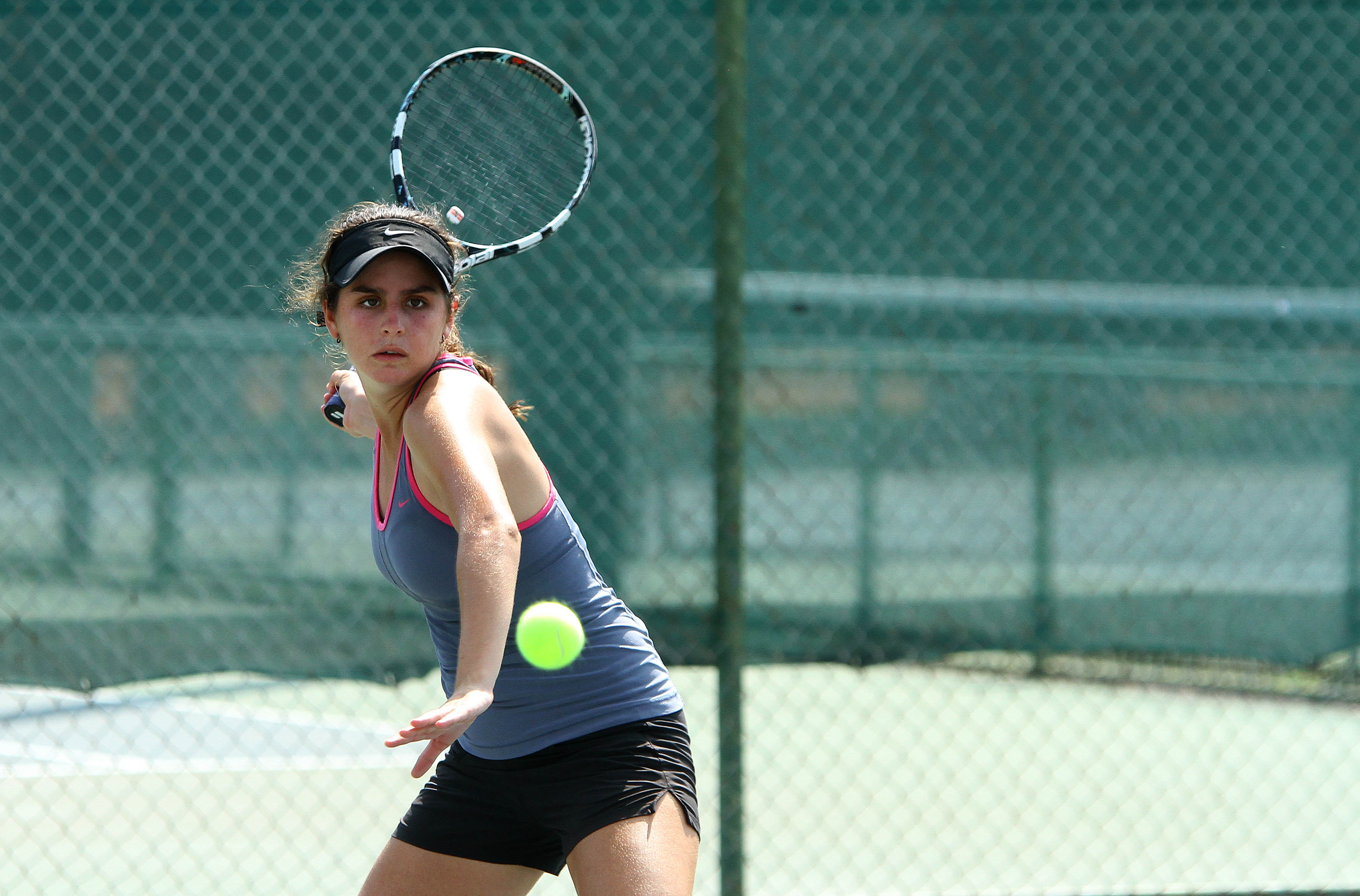
- Gómez at the 2015 Fed Cup
- Country (sports): Ecuador
- Born: 7 April 1997 (age 28) Guayaquil, Ecuador
- Prize money: $331

Singles
- Career record: 2–3
- Career titles: 0

Doubles
- Career record: 2–2
- Career titles: 0

Team competitions
- Fed Cup: 9–7

Rafaela Gómez (born 7 April 1997) is an Ecuadorian tennis player.

Playing for Ecuador at the Fed Cup, Gómez has a win–loss record of 9–7. (Note: Rafaela Gómez at the Billie Jean King Cup (archived))

On the juniors tour, Gómez has a career high ITF junior combined ranking of 219, achieved on 30 March 2015.

== ITF junior finals ==
Grand Slam
Category GA
Category G1
Category G2
Category G3
Category G4
Category G5

=== Singles (2–1) ===
Outcome	W–L	Date	Tournament	Grade	Surface	Opponent	Score
Winner	1–0	6 August 2013	Bogotá, Colombia	G5	Clay	(Colombia) Diana Monsalve	6–4, 7–6^{(7–4)}
Winner	2–0	26 July 2014	Quito, Ecuador	G5	Clay	(Ecuador) Anita Perez Flor	7–6^{(8–6)}, 6–1
Runner-up	2–1	22 November 2014	Guayaquil, Ecuador	G5	Hard	(Colombia) Yuliana Monroy	3–6, 6–4, 1–6

=== Doubles (6–8) ===
Outcome	W–L	Date	Tournament	Grade	Surface	Partner	Opponents	Score
Runner-up	0–1	25 November 2011	Guayaquil, Ecuador	G5	Clay	(Ecuador) Lucía Bustamante	(Colombia) Maria Camila Buitrago (Colombia) María Herazo González	2–6, 7–6^{(7–5)}, [8–10]
Runner-up	0–2	14 July 2012	Luque, Paraguay	G5	Clay	(Paraguay) Gabriela Ferreira Sanabria	(Portugal) Ivone Álvaro (Brazil) Carolina Meligeni Alves	4–6, 1–6
Winner	1–2	28 July 2012	Quito, Ecuador	G5	Clay	(Ecuador) Paula Castro	(Ecuador) Lucía Bustamante (Ecuador) Viviana Margarita Ortiz Barcia	6–3, 3–6, [10–5]
Runner-up	1–3	10 November 2012	Santa Cruz, Bolivia	G3	Clay	(Ecuador) Rafaella Baquerizo	(Bolivia) Nabila Farah (Bolivia) Noelia Zeballos	4–6, 1–6
Winner	2–3	24 November 2012	Guayaquil, Ecuador	G5	Hard	(Ecuador) Rafaella Baquerizo	(United States) Stephanie Nemtsova (Venezuela) Stephanie Rodríguez	6–4, 6–3
Winner	3–3	9 February 2013	Lima, Peru	G2	Clay	(Ecuador) Doménica González	(United States) Madison Bourguignon (Canada) Gloria Liang	4–6, 6–2, [10–5]
Runner-up	3–4	2 March 2013	Guatemala City, Guatemala	G4	Hard	(Bolivia) Daniela Ruiz	(Brazil) Mariana Mayer Humberg (United States) Alexandra Miller-Krasilnikov	6–7^{(4–7)}, 3–6
Runner-up	3–5	6 August 2013	Bogotá, Colombia	G5	Clay	(United States) Miranda Ramirez	(Colombia) Daniela Pedraza Novak (Colombia) Paula Andrea Pérez	7–6^{(7–3)}, 4–6, [4–10]
Runner-up	3–6	10 August 2013	Cali, Colombia	G4	Clay	(Ecuador) Joselyn Margarita Tréyes Albarracín	(Colombia) Daniela Pedraza Novak (Colombia) Paula Andrea Pérez	2–6, 2–6
Winner	4–6	23 November 2013	Guayaquil, Ecuador	G5	Hard	(Colombia) Juliana Valero	(Ecuador) Joselyn Margarita Tréyes Albarracín (Peru) Camila Vargas Gómez	6–4, 6–1
Runner-up	4–7	26 July 2014	Quito, Ecuador	G5	Clay	(Ecuador) Gabriela Cevallos	(Chile) Thais Mendez (Ecuador) Joselyn Margarita Tréyes Albarracín	5–7, 4–6
Runner-up	4–8	27 September 2014	Montevideo, Uruguay	G2	Clay	(Argentina) Julieta Lara Estable	(Chile) Fernanda Astete (Brazil) Leticia Garcia Vidal	4–6, 3–6
Winner	5–8	8 November 2014	Santa Cruz, Bolivia	G3	Clay	(Peru) Camila Vargas Gómez	(Paraguay) Elianne Magali Matto Chaparro (Paraguay) Cindy Oest	1–6, 7–6^{(7–5)}, [10–4]
Winner	6–8	22 November 2014	Guayaquil, Ecuador	G5	Hard	(Ecuador) Camila Romero	(Ecuador) Sofia Daniela Duran Vinueza (Ecuador) Joselyn Margarita Tréyes Albarracín	7–5, 6–0
