= 2014 Fed Cup Americas Zone Group I – play-offs =

The play-offs of the 2014 Fed Cup Americas Zone Group I were the final stages of the Group I Zonal Competition involving teams from the Americas. Using the positions determined in their pools, the seven teams faced off to determine their placing in the 2014 Fed Cup Americas Zone Group I. The top two teams advanced to World Group II play-offs, and the bottom two teams were relegated down to the Americas Zone Group II.

== Pool results ==
Placing	Pool A	Pool B
1	Paraguay	Brazil
2	N/A	Colombia
3	Venezuela	Ecuador
4	Mexico	Bahamas

== Promotion play-off ==
The first placed teams of the two pools were drawn in head-to-head rounds. The winner advanced to the World Group II play-offs.

=== Paraguay vs. Brazil ===
Paraguay
0
Yacht y Golf Club Paraguayo, Lambaré, Paraguay
8 February 2014
Clay

Brazil
2

			1	2	3
1	(Paraguay) (Brazil)	Montserrat González; Paula Cristina Gonçalves	3; 6	6; 4	1; 6
2	(Paraguay) (Brazil)	Verónica Cepede Royg; Teliana Pereira	3; 6	2; 6
3	(Paraguay) (Brazil)	Verónica Cepede Royg / Montserrat González; Paula Cristina Gonçalves / Teliana Pereira				not played

== Relegation play-offs ==
The bottom two teams of the two pools were drawn in head-to-head. The loser was relegated down to Americas Zone Group II in 2015.

=== Mexico vs. Ecuador ===
Mexico
2
Yacht y Golf Club Paraguayo, Lambaré, Paraguay
8 February 2014
Clay

Ecuador
1

			1	2	3
1	(Mexico) (Ecuador)	Ximena Hermoso; Charlotte Römer	6; 2	6; 3
2	(Mexico) (Ecuador)	Ana Sofía Sánchez; Doménica González	6^{4} 7^{7}	2; 6
3	(Mexico) (Ecuador)	Ximena Hermoso / Victoria Rodríguez; Doménica González / Charlotte Römer	7; 5	6; 4

=== Venezuela vs. Bahamas ===
Venezuela
2
Yacht y Golf Club Paraguayo, Lambaré, Paraguay
8 February 2014
Clay

Bahamas
0

			1	2	3
1	(Venezuela) (The Bahamas)	Andrea Gámiz; Iesha Shepherd	6; 0	6; 0
2	(Venezuela) (The Bahamas)	Adriana Pérez; Nikkita Fountain	6; 1	2; 1		retired
3	(Venezuela) (The Bahamas)	Andrea Gámiz / Adriana Pérez; Nikkita Fountain / Larikah Russell				not played

== Final placements ==
Placing	Teams
Promoted	Brazil
Second	Paraguay
Third	Colombia
Fourth	Mexico / Venezuela
Relegated	Ecuador / Bahamas

- Brazil advanced to World Group II play-offs.
- Ecuador and Bahamas were relegated to Americas Zone Group II in 2015.
