= Monica Puig =

Puerto Rican tennis player

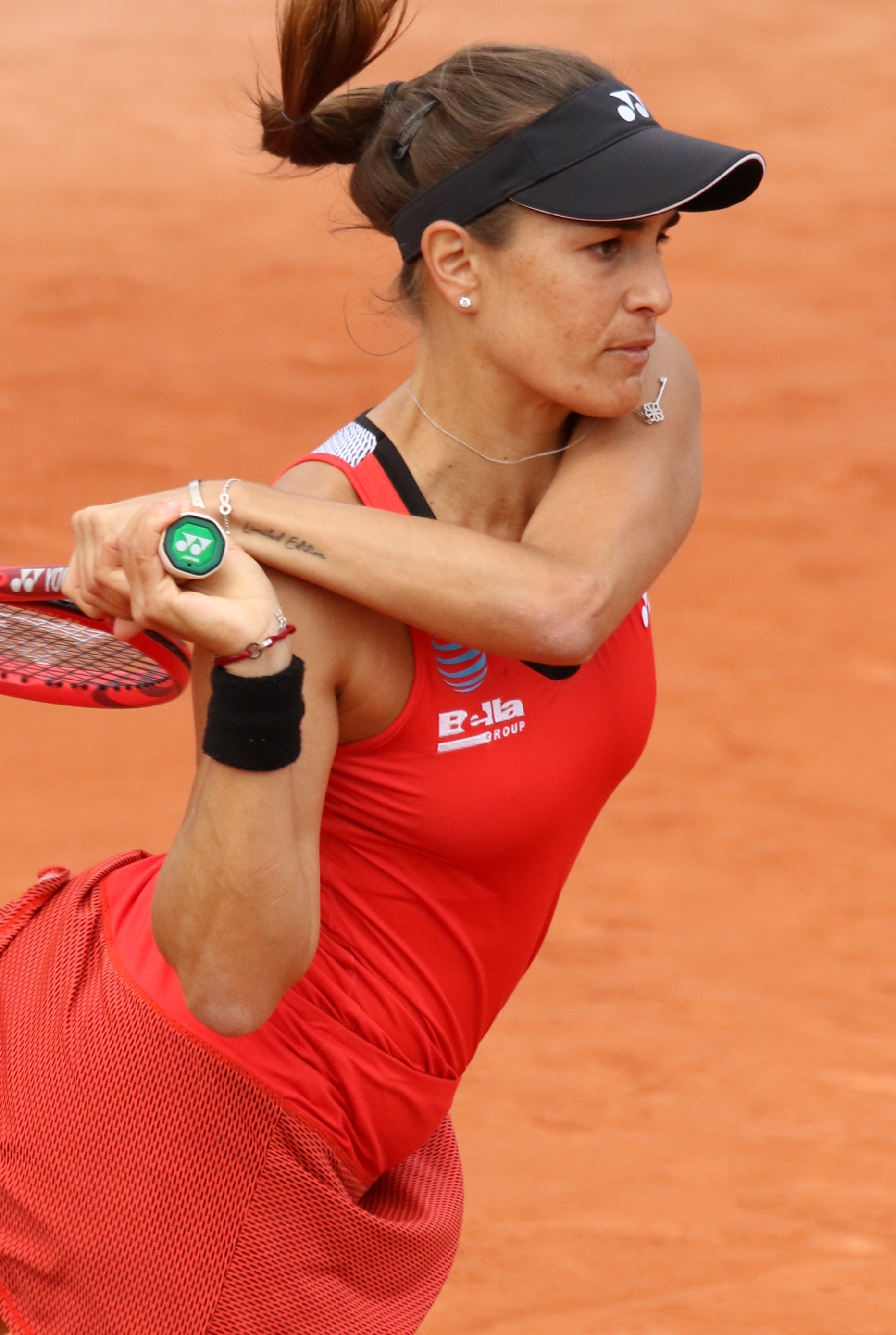
- Puig at the 2019 French Open
- Native name: Monica Puig Marchán
- Country (sports): Puerto Rico
- Residence: Atlanta, Georgia, US
- Born: September 27, 1993 (age 33) San Juan, Puerto Rico
- Height: 1.70 m (5 ft 7 in)
- Turned pro: 2010
- Retired: 2022
- Plays: Right-handed (two-handed backhand)
- Coach: Dorian Descloix
- Prize money: $3,570,823

Singles
- Career record: 303–215
- Career titles: 2
- Highest ranking: No. 27 (September 26, 2016)

Grand Slam singles results
- Australian Open: 3R (2016)
- French Open: 3R (2013, 2016, 2019)
- Wimbledon: 4R (2013)
- US Open: 2R (2014, 2018)

Other tournaments
- Olympic Games: W (2016)

Doubles
- Career record: 18–36
- Career titles: 0
- Highest ranking: No. 210 (May 25, 2015)

Grand Slam doubles results
- Australian Open: 2R (2018)
- French Open: 1R (2014, 2015, 2016)
- Wimbledon: 2R (2016)
- US Open: 1R (2013, 2014, 2016)

Team competitions
- Fed Cup: 27–12
Medal record
Women's tennis
Representing Puerto Rico
Olympic Games
Gold medal – first place	2016 Rio de Janeiro	Women's singles

Monica Puig Marchán (Note: Spanish: Mónica Puig Marchán, pronounced [ˈmonika ˈpwiɣ maɾˈtʃan]; Catalan pronunciation: [ˈputʃ]) (born September 27, 1993) is a Puerto Rican former professional tennis player. She is the first Puerto Rican in history to win a gold medal at the Olympics while representing Puerto Rico, having done so in 2016 at the women's singles event. She is also a Central American and Caribbean champion and Pan American silver medalist.

Having turned professional in 2010, Puig won two WTA Tour singles titles and six ITF singles titles. On 26 September 2016, she reached her career-high singles ranking of world No. 27. On May 25, 2015, she peaked at No. 210 in the doubles rankings. At the 2016 Rio Olympics, Puig won the gold medal, the ninth overall medal at the Games for Puerto Rico. With the feat, she also became the first Latin American champion in the women's singles discipline and is the only unseeded female player to win the gold medal since the reintroduction of tennis in 1988.

During her career, Puig defeated top-ten players Sara Errani, Caroline Garcia, Angelique Kerber, Garbiñe Muguruza, Aryna Sabalenka and Caroline Wozniacki. She retired from the professional tour on June 13, 2022.

== Early life ==
Monica Puig Marchán was born to a Cuban American father, José Puig, and a Puerto Rican mother, Astrid Marchán. Puig stated her paternal grandparents are Catalan. (Note: "Mis abuelos son Catalanes", "My grandparents are Catalans. -lavanguardia.com.)

== Tennis career ==
=== Junior years ===
In 2007, she entered her first tournament at the Prince Cup, but withdrew from the qualifying draw.

In 2008, she started the season with a surprise run to the final of the Costa Rica Bowl (Grade 3) as a qualifier, losing in straight sets to Eugenie Bouchard. She continued her good form, winning two out of three tournaments. Puig continued good results in small Grade-3 and-4 tournaments. In her first Grade-1 tournament in Lexington, she defeated Charlotte Calhoun before going out to Lauren Embree. She continued to participate in bigger tournaments, though not with as much success as she had in the smaller ones.

Puig had her breakthrough season in 2009; she started doing much better in the bigger tournaments. She reached her first Grade-1 final in Casablanca, losing to Mai Grage of Denmark. She continued playing consistently, highlights of the latter months of the year included a semifinal appearance at a Grade-B1 tournament in Tulsa, losing to Bouchard in three sets. In her next tournament, she won the doubles title.

In 2010, she continued her success at a higher level. Puig started the year reaching the final of the 32nd International Casablanca Junior Cup (Grade A), falling easily to Sachie Ishizu of Japan. She then reached another final a week later at the Coffee Bowl (G1) losing to An-Sophie Mestach of Belgium in straights. Puig followed that up with a semifinal appearance at a Grade-1 tournament in Barranquilla. Consistent results followed, before a huge Grade-A title at the 27th Copa Gerdau, defeating Jessica Pegula in the final. After a semifinal appearance at another Grade-A calibre tournament, she fell in the quarterfinals of the French Open. After that, she failed to advance past the quarterfinals of any of her tournaments until the US Open, where she lost to Yulia Putintseva. Puig finished the season with a flourish, falling in the quarterfinals of Osaka (GA), the final of Mérida (G1) and the semifinals of Key Biscayne (GA), both to Lauren Davis.

In July, Puig won the gold medal in women's singles at the Central American and Caribbean Games. At the Youth Olympics in Singapore, she was the second seed in the singles event but lost in the first round to Zheng Saisai of China, in straight sets.

=== 2011: Australian and French junior major finals ===
In January, she won the Traralgon International defeating Yulia Putintseva of Russia. Puig was also in the juniors event of the Australian Open. She qualified for the final but lost to Belgian An-Sophie Mestach. On February 20, Puig won the singles title in Surprise, Arizona defeating Lenka Wienerová, in straight sets.

She received a wildcard into the qualifying of the Indian Wells Open and defeated Anne Keothavong in the first round but was then knocked out by Sorana Cîrstea, in three sets.

In the juniors event of the French Open, she also qualified for the final but lost to Tunisian Ons Jabeur.

Puig won the silver medal at the Pan American Games, defeating Christina McHale of the United States to advance to the gold medal round. She lost to Irina Falconi of the United States in the final.

=== 2012: Reaching the top 200 ===
In January 2012, Puig entered the Auckland Open, ranked 213 in the world, and won the first and second round of qualifying matches, but lost in the last round to the No. 145 in the world, Karolína Plíšková. On 16 January, she entered the Australian Open qualifying draw ranked 209, and lost in the second round to Kirsten Flipkens. At the $25k Andrézieux-Bouthéon tournament, she won two qualifying matches but lost in the first round to Magda Linette of Poland.

In the following month, Puig played on the qualifying draw of two WTA Tour events, in Bogotá and Monterrey, without being able to get past the first round of the main draw. She received a wildcard to play in the Indian Wells Open qualifying draw, but, in the second round, lost to world No. 66, Eleni Daniilidou. Her breakthrough came when she reached the final of the Poza Rica $25k tournament unseeded. The last two matches prior to the final included wins against tournament seeds No. 4 and 1, although she lost to second seed Yaroslava Shvedova.

The second breakthrough of 2012 occurred when she won the first $50k event of her career at Joué-lès-Tours, France. Puig opened the first round by eliminating the top-seed and world ranked 87, Alexandra Panova. In the semifinals, she defeated An-Sophie Mestach, the same opponent to whom she lost in the 2011 Australian Open junior final.

=== 2013: Entering the top 100 ===
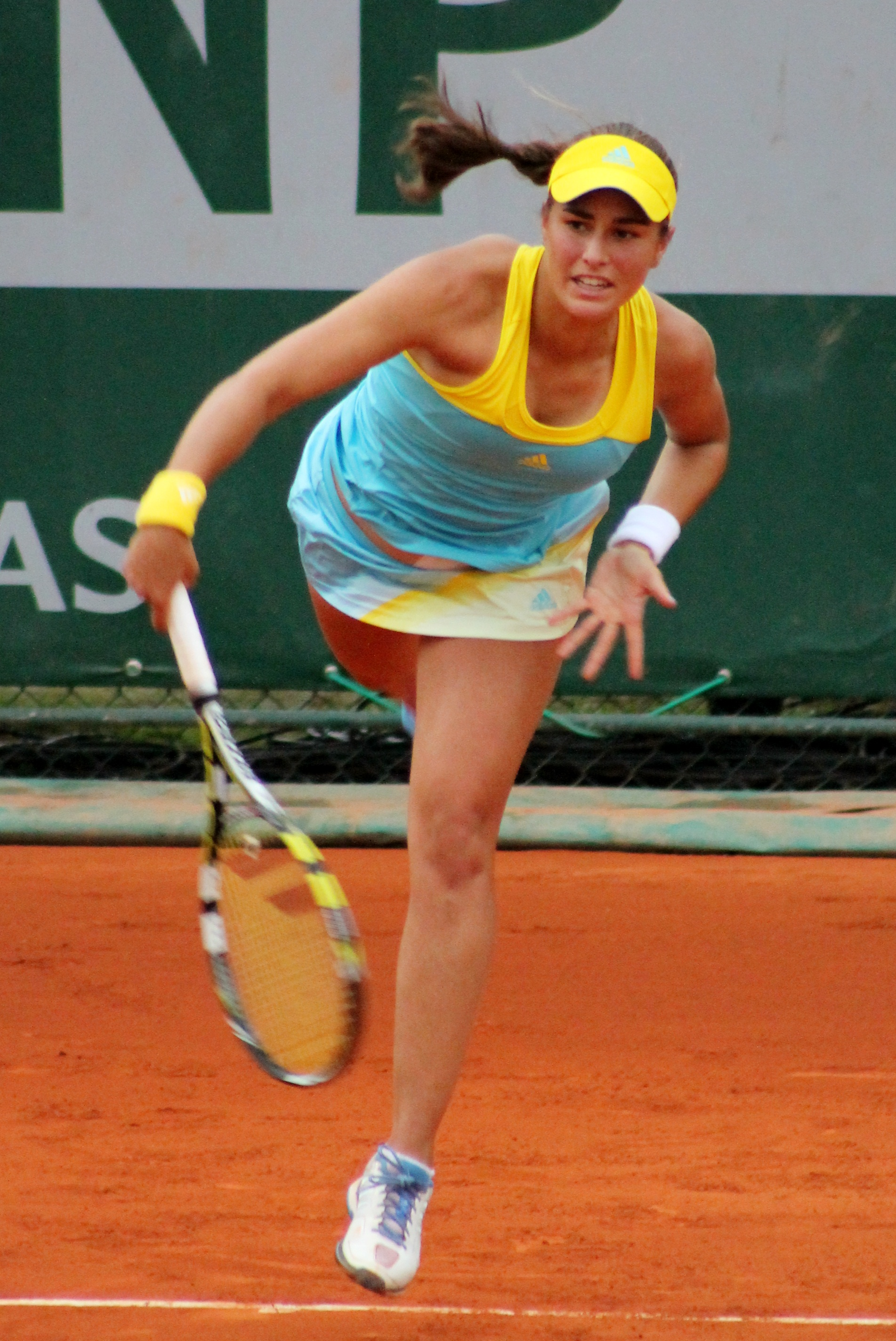
Puig at the 2013 French Open

Puig began her season at the Brisbane International. After coming through qualifying, she reached the second round where she lost to fourth seed Angelique Kerber. At the Australian Open, Puig was defeated in the first round of qualifying by Wang Qiang.

At the WTA indoor event in Paris, Puig lost in the final round of qualifying to Stefanie Vögele. Seeded eighth at the $100k Midland Tennis Classic, Puig reached the semifinal where she was defeated by top seed and eventual champion, Lauren Davis.

=== 2014–15: First WTA Tour title, high ranking of No. 41 ===
In May, she played and won her first WTA final in Strasbourg, defeating Sílvia Soler Espinosa. This success took her to her highest WTA ranking 41st.

In October 2014, Puig won first place at the WTA Rising Stars Invitational in Singapore. Puig defeated Zheng Saisai in two sets. At the end of the year, she was world No. 59.

In this same year, she also won the gold medal at the Central American and Caribbean Games in Veracruz, Mexico representing Puerto Rico.

=== 2016: Breakthrough and Olympic gold medal, top 30 ===
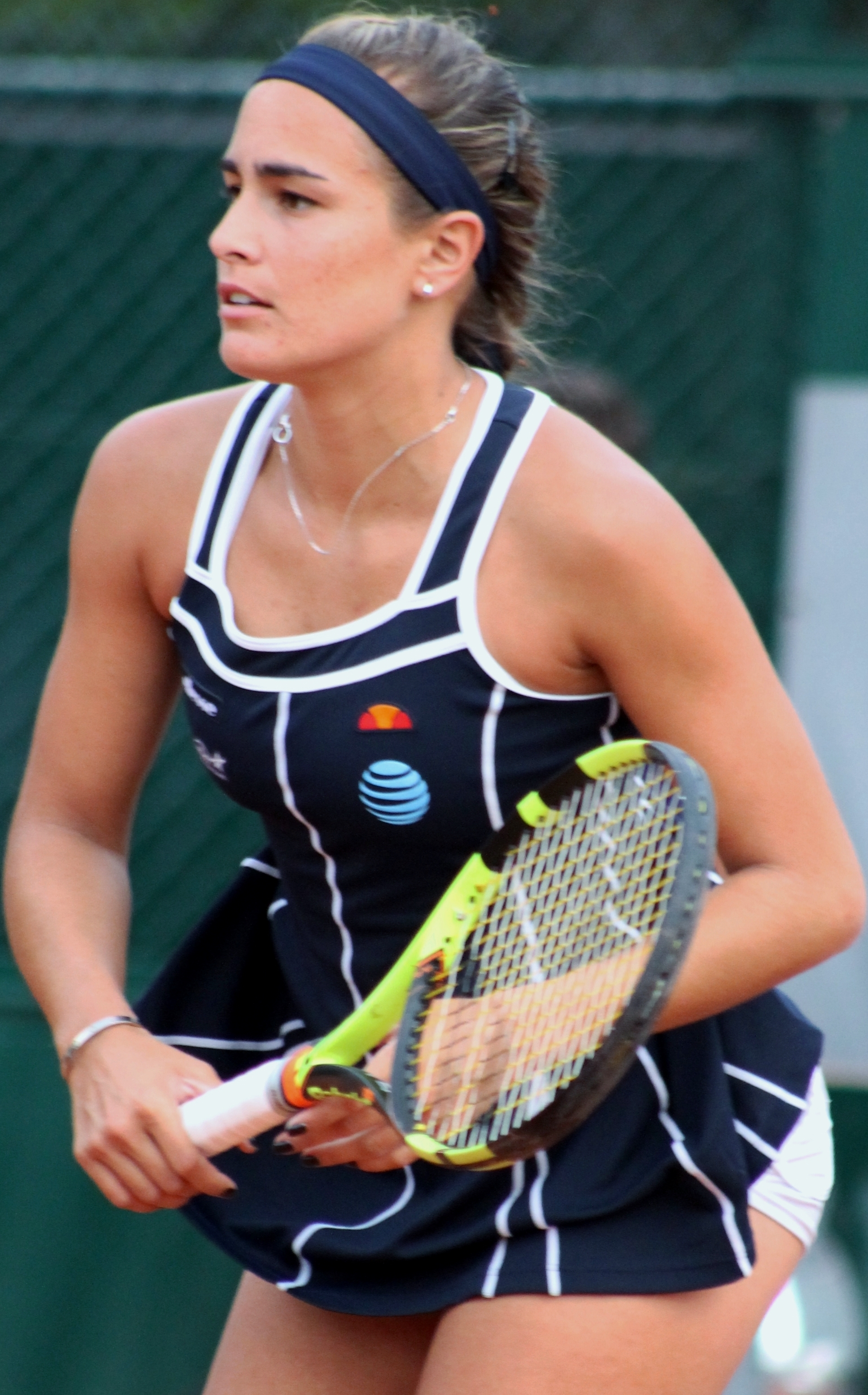
Puig at the 2016 French Open

Puig started the season strongly in Sydney. As a qualifier, she went on to defeat Magdaléna Rybáriková, Anna Karolína Schmiedlová, Samantha Stosur, and Belinda Bencic before losing in her second WTA Tour final to Svetlana Kuznetsova.

At the Australian Open, she reached the third round, defeating Magda Linette and Kristýna Plíšková before losing to the fourth seed Agnieszka Radwańska. She repeated her Australian Open success to reach the third round at the French Open, defeating Olga Govortsova and Julia Görges, before losing to the 15th seed Madison Keys.

In the Eastbourne International, Puig progressed as far as to the semifinals after beating Kristina Mladenovic. At Wimbledon she faced home player Johanna Konta in the first round, in which Puig lost in two sets.

At the Rio Summer Olympics, Puig won the women's singles gold medal by defeating Polona Hercog, Anastasia Pavlyuchenkova, Garbiñe Muguruza, Laura Siegemund, Petra Kvitová, and, finally, Angelique Kerber. Puig became the second unseeded player to win a medal at the Olympics after Alicia Molik had won bronze in Athens and the first athlete representing Puerto Rico to win a gold medal in any sport. In Puerto Rico's Olympic history, Puig is the ninth sportsperson and the first woman to win an Olympic medal. She is the first Latin American representative to win the gold medal in singles and the second to win a medal, after Gabriela Sabatini won silver at the 1988 Summer Olympics. In November, Puig was presented the award for Best Female Athlete in Rio 2016 presented by the Association of National Olympic Committees (ANOC).

She was not originally seeded at the US Open, but after a withdrawal of Sloane Stephens, Puig became the 32nd seed. She lost in the first round to Zheng Saisai, and also in doubles with Mariana Duque-Mariño to Nicole Gibbs and Nao Hibino, and concluded the season with a career best year-end ranking of No. 32.

=== 2017: Loss of form ===
Puig was unable to replicate her success throughout 2017 and fell out of the top 50 in June. By losing in three sets to Mirjana Lučić-Baroni in the first round of the US Open, she concluded her 2017 season without advancing past the second round of any Grand Slam or Premier Mandatory tournament. However, she did end the season on a high note by reaching her fourth career WTA-level final at the Luxembourg Open.

=== 2018 ===
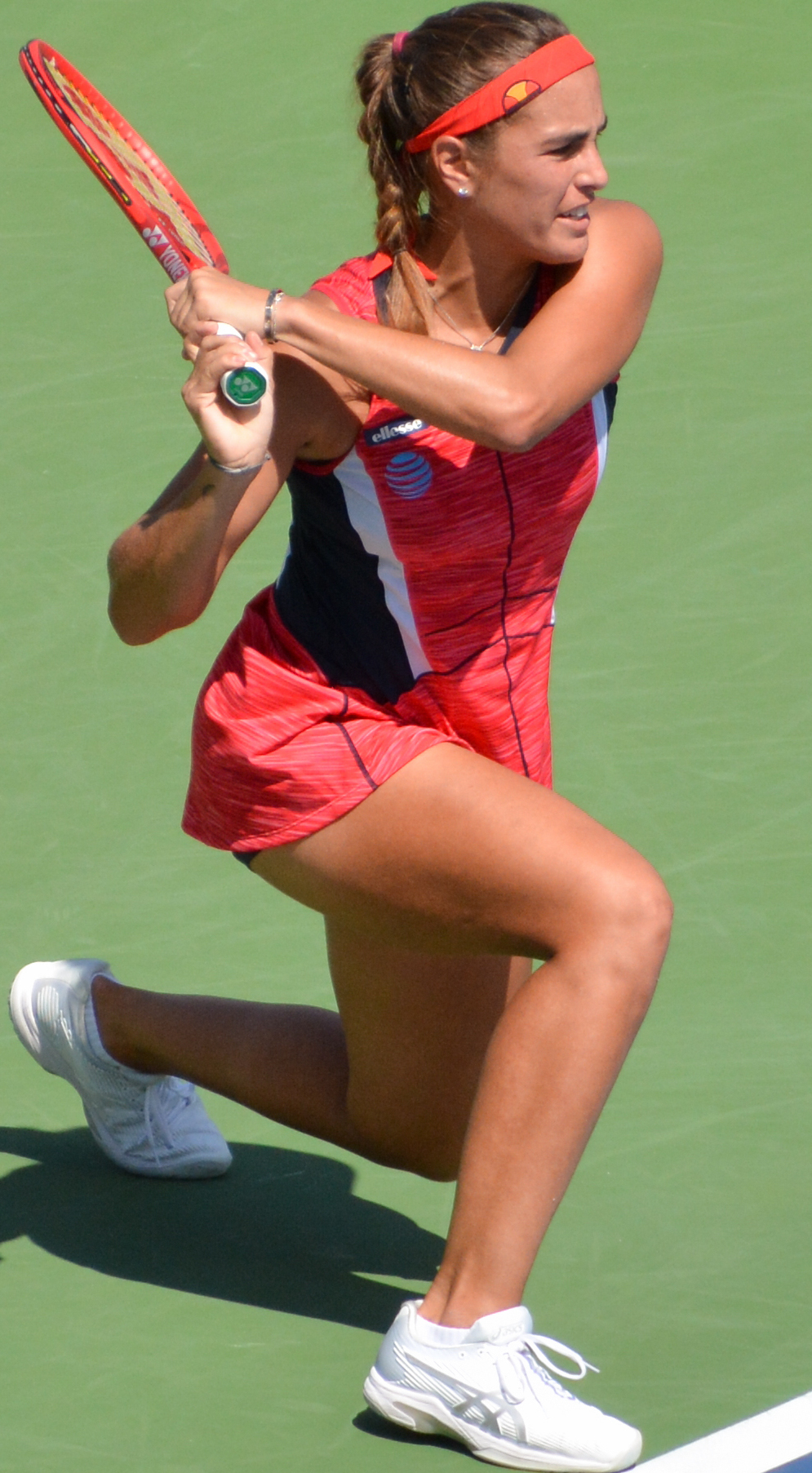
Puig at the 2018 US Open

Puig started the season at the Auckland Open where she lost in the first round to second seed and eventual champion, Julia Görges. At the Sydney International, she was defeated in the final round of qualifying by Kristie Ahn. Puig beat Sam Stosur in the first round of the Australian Open; she lost in the second round to Kaia Kanepi.

In February, Puig competed at the Mexican Open and was defeated in the second round by qualifier Rebecca Peterson. At the Indian Wells Open, she lost in round two to 21st seed Anastasija Sevastova. Puig had a great run at the Miami Open as she stunned second seed Caroline Wozniacki in the second round. However, she was defeated in the fourth round by American qualifier Danielle Collins. Seeded fifth at the Monterrey Open, Puig reached the quarterfinals where she lost to 2012 champion Tímea Babos.

Puig began her clay-court season in May at the Madrid Open. She was defeated in the second round by tenth seed, two-time and eventual champion, Petra Kvitová. Puig retired from her qualifying match in Rome at the Italian Open to Donna Vekić due to a right hip strain. As a result of that injury, she withdrew from the Internationaux de Strasbourg and the French Open.

Puig returned to action in July at the Wimbledon Championships where she lost in the first round to 13th seed and eventual semifinalist, Julia Görges.

=== 2019 ===
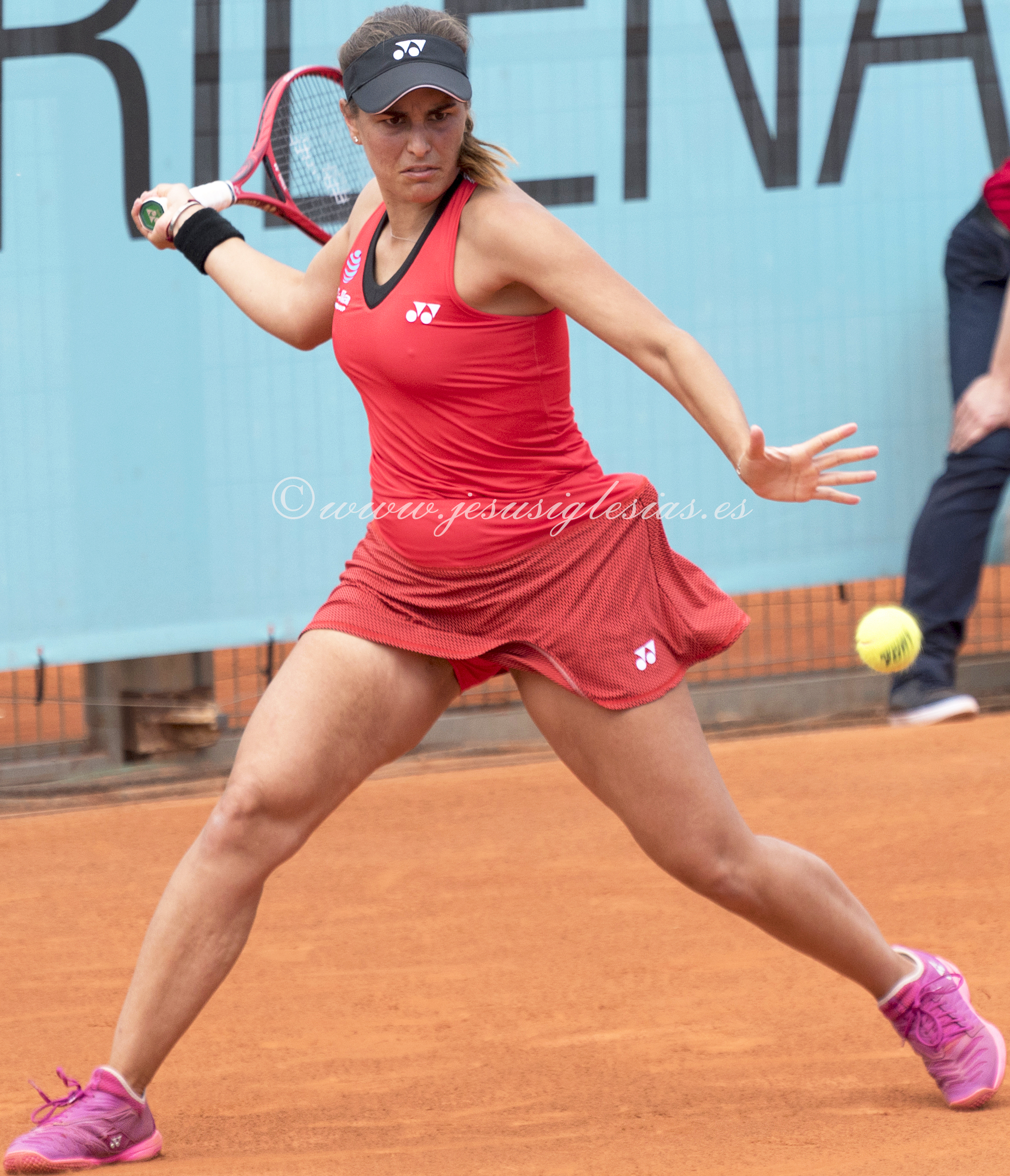
Puig at the 2019 Madrid Open

Puig started her 2019 season at the Auckland Open where she lost in the second round to third seed Hsieh Su-wei. In Sydney, she was defeated in the final round of qualifying by Aliaksandra Sasnovich. However, due to Naomi Osaka withdrawing from the tournament, she entered the main draw as a lucky loser but lost in the first round to Anett Kontaveit. Ranked 54 at the Australian Open, she was eliminated in the first round by Anastasia Pavlyuchenkova.

Playing for Puerto Rico in the Fed Cup tie against Colombia, Puig won her match over María Herazo González. Colombia ended up winning the tie over Puerto Rico 2–1. In Acapulco, she upset sixth seed Maria Sakkari in the first round. She then retired during her second-round match against Wang Yafan due to food poisoning. At Indian Wells, she was beaten in the second round by 21st seed Anett Kontaveit. At the Miami Open, she lost in the first round to Chinese wildcard Wang Xiyu.

Puig kicked off her clay-court season at the Charleston Open.

=== 2020 ===
She missed the Auckland Open and the Australian Open due to her undergoing right elbow surgery.

Puig returned to the tour in August at the Cincinnati Open and lost in the first round of qualifying to American wildcard Katie Volynets. At the US Open, she was defeated in the first round by Margarita Gasparyan.

Competing at the French Open, Puig lost her first-round match to 2012 finalist and qualifier, Sara Errani.

Puig ended the year ranked 105.

=== 2022: Comeback and retirement ===
She made a comeback after two years at the Madrid Open where she lost to Danielle Collins in the first round, in straight sets.

Puig retired in June 2022 due to the cumulative effects of repeated injuries she sustained throughout her career.

=== Coaching ===
Puig has had multiple coaches in her career, including Alain De Vos (2008–2014), Ricardo Sánchez (2014–2015), Juan Todero (2015–2018), Kamau Murray and Othmane Garma (2019), Philippe DeHaes, and Diego Veronelli. In August 2020, she announced the return of Juan Todero as her coach. At the end of 2021, she announced Dorian Descloix will be her new coach

== World TeamTennis ==
Puig played one season of World TeamTennis, making her debut in 2019 with the Vegas Rollers for their inaugural season. It had been announced that Puig wanted to return to the Vegas Rollers during the 2020 WTT season.

== Personal life ==
Puig was in a relationship with baseball player Derek Dietrich. The two met when he was playing for the Miami Marlins and she was invited to throw the first pitch; they started dating in early 2017. In 2019, when Dietrich was playing for the Cincinnati Reds, Puig served a first pitch during a game using a tennis racket.

Puig became engaged to fellow tennis player Nathan Rakitt in 2021, and they got married on November 11, 2022. On February 1, 2025, Puig and Rakitt announced they were expecting their first child. Puig gave birth to a daughter on July 30, 2025.

== Marathon running ==
After retiring from tennis, Puig found a new passion in marathon running. She joined her then-fiancé, former Georgia Tech tennis player and avid runner Nathan Rakitt, for a run and enjoyed it, so much that they decided to sign up for the 2022 New York City Marathon. Puig was cheered on by Puerto Ricans and finished the New York marathon in just over 4 1/2 hours. She and Rakitt got married in San Juan a few days after the New York marathon and planned their marathon running goals when they flew back to their Atlanta home. They plan to run the six major marathons by 2024 to earn the Six Star medal from the Abbott World Major Marathons. Needing to run a sub-3:30 marathon for both the 2023 Boston and London marathons, she reached out to the organizers of both marathons and got a waiver based on her being a pro athlete and her New York results.

In between her work with ESPN and the Tennis Channel doing live commentary in Spanish, Puig trains with COROS and coach Derek Dalzell to improve her endurance, pace, nutrition, and recovery.

== Career statistics ==
=== Grand Slam tournament performance timeline ===
Key
W	F	SF	QF	#R	RR	Q#	DNQ	A	NH

(W) winner; (F) finalist; (SF) semifinalist; (QF) quarterfinalist; (#R) rounds 4, 3, 2, 1; (RR) round-robin stage; (Q#) qualification round; (DNQ) did not qualify; (A) absent; (NH) not held; (SR) strike rate (events won / competed); (W–L) win–loss record.
To avoid confusion and double counting, these charts are updated at the conclusion of a tournament or when the player's participation has ended.

==== Singles ====
Tournament	2012	2013	2014	2015	2016	2017	2018	2019	2020	2021	SR	W–L	Win %
Australian Open	Q2	Q1	2R	2R	3R	2R	2R	1R	A	A	0 / 6	6–6	50%
French Open	Q3	3R	1R	1R	3R	2R	A	3R	1R	A	0 / 7	7–7	50%
Wimbledon	A	4R	1R	1R	1R	1R	1R	2R	NH	A	0 / 7	4–7	36%
US Open	Q1	1R	2R	1R	1R	1R	2R	1R	1R	A	0 / 8	2–8	20%
Win–loss	0–0	5–3	2–4	1–4	4–4	2–4	2–3	3–4	0–2	0–0	0 / 28	19–28	40%

Notes

- Grand Slam performances source

=== Olympic final ===
==== Singles: 1 (gold medal) ====
Result	Year	Location	Surface	Opponent	Score
Gold	2016	Rio de Janeiro	Hard	(Germany) Angelique Kerber	6–4, 4–6, 6–1

== See also ==
- List of Puerto Ricans
- Sports in Puerto Rico
- Puerto Rico at the Olympics
- History of women in Puerto Rico
