= 2014 Fed Cup World Group II play-offs =

Part of tennis tournament

The World Group II play-offs were four ties which involved the losing nations of the World Group II and four nations from the three Zonal Group I competitions. Nations that won their play-off ties entered the 2015 World Group, while losing nations joined their respective zonal groups.

Participating Teams
Brazil	Japan	Netherlands	Romania
Serbia	Sweden	Switzerland	Thailand

== Romania vs. Serbia ==
Romania
4
Arenele BNR, Bucharest, Romania
19–20 April 2014
Clay (outdoor)

Serbia
1

			1	2	3
1	(Romania) (Serbia)	Sorana Cîrstea; Ana Ivanovic	3; 6	6; 1	6; 2
2	(Romania) (Serbia)	Simona Halep; Bojana Jovanovski	6; 2	6; 4
3	(Romania) (Serbia)	Simona Halep; Ana Ivanovic	3; 6	6^{2} 7^{7}
4	(Romania) (Serbia)	Sorana Cîrstea; Bojana Jovanovski	6; 3	6^{7} 7^{9}	6; 3
5	(Romania) (Serbia)	Irina-Camelia Begu / Monica Niculescu; Jovana Jakšić / Nina Stojanović	1; 0			retired

== Netherlands vs. Japan ==
Netherlands
3
Maaspoort Sports and Events, 's-Hertogenbosch, Netherlands
19–20 April 2014
Clay (indoor)

Japan
2

			1	2	3
1	(Netherlands) (Japan)	Arantxa Rus; Kurumi Nara	5; 7	6; 2	1; 6
2	(Netherlands) (Japan)	Kiki Bertens; Misaki Doi	6; 0	7^{7} 6^{3}
3	(Netherlands) (Japan)	Kiki Bertens; Kurumi Nara	7^{7} 6^{5}	4; 6	9; 7
4	(Netherlands) (Japan)	Arantxa Rus; Misaki Doi	7; 5	6; 3
5	(Netherlands) (Japan)	Richèl Hogenkamp / Michaëlla Krajicek; Shuko Aoyama / Risa Ozaki	6; 1	3; 6	8; 10

== Sweden vs. Thailand ==
Sweden
4
Sparbanken Lidköping Arena, Lidköping, Sweden
19–20 April 2014
Hard (indoor)

Thailand
0

			1	2	3
1	(Sweden) (Thailand)	Johanna Larsson; Noppawan Lertcheewakarn	6; 1	6; 3
2	(Sweden) (Thailand)	Sofia Arvidsson; Luksika Kumkhum	6; 4	6; 2
3	(Sweden) (Thailand)	Johanna Larsson; Luksika Kumkhum	6; 4	6; 2
4	(Sweden) (Thailand)	Sofia Arvidsson; Noppawan Lertcheewakarn				not played
5	(Sweden) (Thailand)	Hilda Melander / Rebecca Peterson; Tamarine Tanasugarn / Varatchaya Wongteanchai	6; 4	6; 2

== Brazil vs. Switzerland ==
Brazil
1
Clube de Tênis Catanduva, Catanduva, Brazil
19–20 April 2014
Clay (outdoor)

Switzerland
4

			1	2	3
1	(Brazil) (Switzerland)	Teliana Pereira; Timea Bacsinszky	3; 6	3; 6
2	(Brazil) (Switzerland)	Paula Cristina Gonçalves; Belinda Bencic	3; 6	3; 6
3	(Brazil) (Switzerland)	Teliana Pereira; Belinda Bencic	6; 3	6; 4
4	(Brazil) (Switzerland)	Paula Cristina Gonçalves; Timea Bacsinszky	5; 7	2; 6
5	(Brazil) (Switzerland)	Gabriela Cé / Laura Pigossi; Belinda Bencic / Viktorija Golubic	2; 6	2; 6
