= 1993 San Marino Open – Singles =

Singles
- 1993 San Marino Open

Final
- Champion: (Italy) Marzia Grossi
- Runner-up: (Germany) Barbara Rittner
- Score: 3–6, 7–5, 6–1

Details
- Draw: 32 (2WC/4Q/3LL)
- Seeds: 8

Events
Singles	Doubles
← 1992 ·	WTA San Marino

Magdalena Maleeva was the defending champion, but did not compete this year.

Marzia Grossi won the title by defeating Barbara Rittner 3–6, 7–5, 6–1 in the final.

== Seeds ==
1. (Germany) Barbara Rittner (final)
2. (Italy) Sandra Cecchini (quarterfinals)
3. (Argentina) Florencia Labat (quarterfinals)
4. (Argentina) ~~Patricia Tarabini~~ (withdrew)
5. (Czech Republic) ~~Radka Bobková~~ (withdrew)
6. (Germany) Meike Babel (semifinals)
7. (Romania) Ruxandra Dragomir (second round)
8. (Italy) Federica Bonsignori (second round)

== Draw ==
=== Key ===
- Q = Qualifier
- WC = Wild card
- LL = Lucky loser
- Alt = Alternate
- SE = Special exempt
- PR = Protected ranking
- ITF = ITF entry
- JE = Junior exempt
- w/o = Walkover
- r = Retired
- d = Defaulted
- SR = Special ranking

=== Finals ===
Semifinals
1	(Germany) Barbara Rittner	6	1	7^{7}
(South Africa) Joannette Kruger	2	6	6^{4}
6	(Germany) Meike Babel	1	1
(Italy) Marzia Grossi	6	6

Final
1	(Germany) Barbara Rittner	6	5	1
(Italy) Marzia Grossi	3	7	6

=== Top half ===
First round
1	(Germany) B Rittner	6	6
(Israel) A Smashnova	2	1
(Finland) P Thorén	6	6
LL	(Italy) F Perfetti	3	1
(Germany) S Meier	4	0
(France) N van Lottum	6	6
(Italy) MF Bentivoglio	3	6	6
(France) A Fusai	6	4	2
LL	(Italy) Ad Serra Zanetti	6	7^{7}
(Italy) K Piccolini	0	6^{4}
(Belgium) S Wasserman	3	6	6
(Italy) S Farina	6	3	2
(South Africa) J Kruger	6	6
Q	(Czech Republic) K Bláhová	4	3
(Italy) B Romanò	1	0^{r}
7	(Romania) R Dragomir	6	1

Second round
1	(Germany) B Rittner	6	6
(Finland) P Thorén	0	4
(France) N van Lottum	4	5
(Italy) MF Bentivoglio	6	7
LL	(Italy) Ad Serra Zanetti	6	2	5
(Belgium) S Wasserman	3	6	7
(South Africa) J Kruger	3	6	6
7	(Romania) R Dragomir	6	4	4

Quarterfinals
1	(Germany) B Rittner	6	6
(Italy) MF Bentivoglio	4	3
(Belgium) S Wasserman	2	2
(South Africa) J Kruger	6	6

Semifinals
1	(Germany) B Rittner	6	1	7^{7}
(South Africa) J Kruger	2	6	6^{4}

=== Bottom half ===
First round
6	(Germany) M Babel	5
(Germany) M Živec-Škulj	0^{r}
(Austria) S Dopfer	0	6	7
(Bulgaria) E Pampoulova	6	0	5
(Brazil) A Vieira	6	6
WC	(Bulgaria) L Bacheva	4	2
Q	(Slovakia) K Habšudová	0	6^{4}
3	(Argentina) F Labat	6	7^{7}
8	(Italy) F Bonsignori	3	6	7
Q	(Austria) B Schett	6	4	5
LL	(Italy) G Mugnaini	3	5
(Italy) M Grossi	6	7
WC	(Italy) R Grande	3	0
Q	(Belgium) L Courtois	6	6
(Italy) G Pizzichini	1	0
2	(Italy) S Cecchini	6	6

Second round
6	(Germany) M Babel	6	4
(Austria) S Dopfer	2	1^{r}
(Brazil) A Vieira	2	1
3	(Argentina) F Labat	6	6
8	(Italy) F Bonsignori	3	6^{5}
(Italy) M Grossi	6	7^{7}
Q	(Belgium) L Courtois	6^{1}	6^{5}
2	(Italy) S Cecchini	7^{7}	7^{7}

Quarterfinals
6	(Germany) M Babel	3	6	6
3	(Argentina) F Labat	6	2	0
(Italy) M Grossi	6	6
2	(Italy) S Cecchini	2	4

Semifinals
6	(Germany) M Babel	1	1
(Italy) M Grossi	6	6
