= 1992 Internazionali di Tennis San Marino – Singles =

Singles
- 1992 Internazionali di Tennis San Marino

Final
- Champion: (Bulgaria) Magdalena Maleeva
- Runner-up: (Italy) Federica Bonsignori
- Score: 7–6^{(7–3)}, 6–4

Details
- Draw: 32 (2WC/4Q/1LL)
- Seeds: 8

Events
Singles	Doubles
← 1991 ·	WTA San Marino	· 1993 →

Katia Piccolini was the defending champion, but lost in the first round to Maja Živec-Škulj.

Magdalena Maleeva won the title by defeating Federica Bonsignori 7–6^{(7–3)}, 6–4 in the final.

== Seeds ==
1. (Bulgaria) Magdalena Maleeva (champion)
2. (Switzerland) Emanuela Zardo (first round)
3. (France) Alexia Dechaume (semifinals)
4. (Italy) Sandra Cecchini (second round)
5. (Italy) Silvia Farina (first round)
6. (Argentina) Florencia Labat (quarterfinals)
7. (Argentina) Mercedes Paz (semifinals)
8. (Italy) Katia Piccolini (first round)

== Draw ==
=== Key ===
- Q = Qualifier
- WC = Wild card
- LL = Lucky loser
- Alt = Alternate
- SE = Special exempt
- PR = Protected ranking
- ITF = ITF entry
- JE = Junior exempt
- w/o = Walkover
- r = Retired
- d = Defaulted
- SR = Special ranking

=== Finals ===
Semifinals
1	(Bulgaria) Magdalena Maleeva	2	6	6
3	(France) Alexia Dechaume	6	3	3
(Italy) Federica Bonsignori	6	5	6
7	(Argentina) Mercedes Paz	2	7	4

Final
1	(Bulgaria) Magdalena Maleeva	7^{7}	6
(Italy) Federica Bonsignori	6^{3}	4

=== Top half ===
First round
1	(Bulgaria) M Maleeva	6	6
(Austria) S Dopfer	1	1
Q	(Italy) G Boschiero	4	6^{5}
(France) C Mothes	6	7^{7}
WC	(Italy) F Perfetti	6	7
(Finland) P Thorén	0	5
(Germany) M Živec-Škulj	6	6
8	(Italy) K Piccolini	3	3
3	(France) A Dechaume	6
(Canada) H Kelesi	3	r
Q	(France) A Fusai	6	6^{5}	6
(Mexico) A Gavaldón	4	7^{7}	3
Q	(Italy) C Salvi	6	6^{5}	6
(Japan) M Miyauchi	2	7^{7}	1
(Argentina) P Tarabini	6	6
5	(Italy) S Farina	4	4

Second round
1	(Bulgaria) M Maleeva	6	6
(France) C Mothes	4	0
WC	(Italy) F Perfetti	3	6	6
(Germany) M Živec-Škulj	6	4	3
3	(France) A Dechaume	6	6
Q	(France) A Fusai	1	0
Q	(Italy) C Salvi	1	2
(Argentina) P Tarabini	6	6

Quarterfinals
1	(Bulgaria) M Maleeva	6	6
WC	(Italy) F Perfetti	3	2
3	(France) A Dechaume	6	6
(Argentina) P Tarabini	4	1

Semifinals
1	(Bulgaria) M Maleeva	2	6	6
3	(France) A Dechaume	6	3	3

=== Bottom half ===
First round
6	(Argentina) F Labat	6	6
LL	(Germany) A Kerek	0	1
WC	(Bulgaria) L Bacheva	6	6
(Finland) N Dahlman	2	3
(Italy) F Romano	5	3
(Italy) F Bonsignori	7	6
Q	(Argentina) MJ Gaidano	6	3	0
4	(Italy) S Cecchini	4	6	6
7	(Argentina) M Paz	6	6
(Italy) L Garrone	4	2
(Hungary) A Temesvári	2	4
(Italy) N Baudone	6	6
(Bulgaria) E Pampoulova	6	1	1
(Argentina) B Fulco-Villella	3	6	6
(South Africa) J Kruger	6	6
2	(Switzerland) E Zardo	3	3

Second round
6	(Argentina) F Labat	7	6
WC	(Bulgaria) L Bacheva	5	3
(Italy) F Bonsignori	6	6
4	(Italy) S Cecchini	1	2
7	(Argentina) M Paz	6	6
(Italy) N Baudone	0	3
(Argentina) B Fulco-Villella	7^{7}	6
(South Africa) J Kruger	6^{3}	1

Quarterfinals
6	(Argentina) F Labat	2	4
(Italy) F Bonsignori	6	6
7	(Argentina) M Paz	7^{7}	6
(Argentina) B Fulco-Villella	6^{4}	4

Semifinals
(Italy) F Bonsignori	6	5	6
7	(Argentina) M Paz	2	7	4
