= 1992 Internazionali di Tennis San Marino – Doubles =

Doubles
- 1992 Internazionali di Tennis San Marino

Final
- Champions: (France) Alexia Dechaume (Argentina) Florencia Labat
- Runners-up: (Italy) Sandra Cecchini (Italy) Laura Garrone
- Score: 7–6^{(8–6)}, 7–5

Details
- Draw: 16 (1WC/1Q)
- Seeds: 4

Events
Singles	Doubles
← 1991 ·	WTA San Marino	· 1993 →

Kerry-Anne Guse and Akemi Nishiya were the defending champions, but none competed this year.

Alexia Dechaume and Florencia Labat won the title by defeating Sandra Cecchini and Laura Garrone 7–6^{(8–6)}, 7–5 in the final.

== Seeds ==
1. (Argentina) Mercedes Paz / (Argentina) Patricia Tarabini (quarter-finals)
2. (France) Alexia Dechaume / (Argentina) Florencia Labat (champions)
3. (Italy) Sandra Cecchini / (Italy) Laura Garrone (final)
4. (Bulgaria) ~~Magdalena Maleeva~~ / (Hungary) ~~Andrea Temesvári~~ (withdrew)

== Draw ==
=== Key ===
- Q = Qualifier
- WC = Wild card
- LL = Lucky loser
- Alt = Alternate
- SE = Special exempt
- PR = Protected ranking
- ITF = ITF entry
- JE = Junior exempt
- w/o = Walkover
- r = Retired
- d = Defaulted
- SR = Special ranking

=== Draw ===
First round
1	(Argentina) M Paz (Argentina) P Tarabini	7^{7}	6
(Italy) S Farina (Italy) E Savoldi	6^{4}	2
(Bulgaria) L Bacheva (Germany) C Schneider	5	6	5
(France) A Fusai (Switzerland) N Tschan	7	3	7
3	(Italy) S Cecchini (Italy) L Garrone	6	6^{6}	6
(Italy) N Baudone (Italy) K Piccolini	3	7^{8}	4
(Greece) J Apostoli (Italy) F Bonsignori	4	1
(South Africa) J Kruger (Bulgaria) E Pampoulova	6	6
(Italy) G Boschiero (Switzerland) E Zardo	4	5
(Austria) S Dopfer (United States) A Gooden	6	7
(Argentina) B Fulco-Villella (Canada) H Kelesi	6	4	3
(Finland) N Dahlman (Finland) P Thorén	3	6	6
Q	(Italy) S Attili (Italy) E Brusati	2	1
(Australia) J Hodder (Australia) K Sharpe	6	6
WC	(San Marino) F Guardigli (Italy) Ad Serra Zanetti	1	3
2	(France) A Dechaume (Argentina) F Labat	6	6

Quarter-finals
1	(Argentina) M Paz (Argentina) P Tarabini	2	4
(France) A Fusai (Switzerland) N Tschan	6	6
3	(Italy) S Cecchini (Italy) L Garrone	6	6
(South Africa) J Kruger (Bulgaria) E Pampoulova	3	4
(Austria) S Dopfer (United States) A Gooden	4	5
(Finland) N Dahlman (Finland) P Thorén	6	7
(Australia) J Hodder (Australia) K Sharpe	4	4
2	(France) A Dechaume (Argentina) F Labat	6	6

Semi-finals
(France) A Fusai (Switzerland) N Tschan	2	6	3
3	(Italy) S Cecchini (Italy) L Garrone	6	4	6
(Finland) N Dahlman (Finland) P Thorén	3	1
2	(France) A Dechaume (Argentina) F Labat	6	6

Final
3	(Italy) S Cecchini (Italy) L Garrone	6^{6}	5
2	(France) A Dechaume (Argentina) F Labat	7^{8}	7
