= 1993 San Marino Open – Doubles =

Doubles
- 1993 San Marino Open

Final
- Champions: (Italy) Sandra Cecchini; (Argentina) Patricia Tarabini
- Runners-up: (Argentina) Florencia Labat; (Germany) Barbara Rittner
- Score: 6–3, 6–2

Details
- Draw: 16 (1WC/1Q)
- Seeds: 4

Events
Singles	Doubles
← 1992 ·	WTA San Marino

Alexia Dechaume and Florencia Labat were the defending champions, but Dechaume did not compete this year.

Labat teamed up with Barbara Rittner and lost in the final to Sandra Cecchini and Patricia Tarabini. The score was 6–3, 6–2.

== Seeds ==
1. (Italy) Sandra Cecchini / (Argentina) Patricia Tarabini (champions)
2. (Italy) Silvia Farina / (Slovakia) Karina Habšudová (semifinals)
3. (Argentina) Florencia Labat / (Germany) Barbara Rittner (final)
4. (France) Alexandra Fusai / (Germany) Maja Živec-Škulj (first round, withdrew)

== Draw ==
=== Key ===
- Q = Qualifier
- WC = Wild card
- LL = Lucky loser
- Alt = Alternate
- SE = Special exempt
- PR = Protected ranking
- ITF = ITF entry
- JE = Junior exempt
- w/o = Walkover
- r = Retired
- d = Defaulted
- SR = Special ranking

=== Draw ===
First round

Quarterfinals

Semifinals

Final

1
(Italy) S Cecchini
(Argentina) P Tarabini
6
6

(Italy) Ad Serra Zanetti
(Italy) Sara Ventura
2
2

1
(Italy) S Cecchini
(Argentina) P Tarabini
7^{9}
7

- (South Africa) J Kruger
- (Brazil) A Vieira
3
0

- (Romania) R Dragomir
- (France) N van Lottum
6^{7}
5

(Romania) R Dragomir
(France) N van Lottum
6
6

1
(Italy) S Cecchini
(Argentina) P Tarabini
6
7

4
- (France) A Fusai
- (Germany) M Živec-Škulj

- (Argentina) B Fulco Villella
- (Finland) P Thorén
1
5

(Argentina) B Fulco Villella
(Finland) P Thorén
w/o

(Argentina) B Fulco Villella
(Finland) P Thorén
6
6

(Italy) G Boschiero
(Italy) Giulia Toschi
7^{7}
2
4

WC
- (San Marino) F Guardigli
- (Italy) C Salvi
3
1

WC
(San Marino) F Guardigli
(Italy) C Salvi
6^{4}
6
6

1
(Italy) S Cecchini
(Argentina) P Tarabini
6
6

(Germany) M Babel
(Germany) S Meier
7
6

3
- (Argentina) F Labat
- (Germany) B Rittner
3
2

- (Italy) F Perfetti
- (Italy) G Pizzichini
5
3

- (Germany) M Babel
- (Germany) S Meier
3
3

- (Czech Republic) K Bláhová
- (Italy) E Brusati
5
1

3
(Argentina) F Labat
(Germany) B Rittner
6
6

3
(Argentina) F Labat
(Germany) B Rittner
7
6

3
(Argentina) F Labat
(Germany) B Rittner
6
6

(Poland) Małgorzata Jankowska
(Czech Republic) E Melicharová
w/o

2
- (Italy) S Farina
- (Slovakia) K Habšudová
2
3

- (Austria) S Dopfer
- (Bulgaria) E Pampoulova

- (Poland) Małgorzata Jankowska
- (Czech Republic) E Melicharová
1
5

Q
- (Bulgaria) L Bacheva
- (Austria) B Schett
4
2

2
(Italy) S Farina
(Slovakia) K Habšudová
6
7

2
(Italy) S Farina
(Slovakia) K Habšudová
6
6
