= 1993 San Marino Open =

- Date: 26 July – 1 August
- Edition: 3rd
- Category: Tier IV
- Draw: 32S / 16D
- Prize money: $100,000
- Surface: Clay / outdoor
- Location: City of San Marino, San Marino
- Venue: Centro Tennis Cassa de Risparmio

Champions

Singles
- (Italy) Marzia Grossi

Doubles
- (Italy) Sandra Cecchini; (Argentina) Patricia Tarabini
← 1992 ·	WTA San Marino

The 1993 San Marino Open was a women's tennis tournament played on outdoor clay courts at the Centro Tennis Cassa de Risparmio in the City of San Marino, San Marino that was part of the Tier IV category of the 1993 WTA Tour. It was the third and last edition of the WTA San Marino and was held from 26 July until 1 August 1993. Unseeded Marzia Grossi won the singles title and earned $18,000 first-prize money.

== Finals ==
=== Singles ===
(Italy) Marzia Grossi defeated (Germany) Barbara Rittner 3–6, 7–5, 6–1

- It was Grossi's first singles title of her career.

=== Doubles ===
(Italy) Sandra Cecchini / (Argentina) Patricia Tarabini defeated (Argentina) Florencia Labat / (Germany) Barbara Rittner 6–3, 6–2

== See also ==
- 1993 Campionati Internazionali di San Marino – men's tournament
