= 1992 Internazionali di Tennis San Marino =

- Date: 20–26 July
- Edition: 2nd
- Category: Tier V
- Draw: 32S / 16D
- Prize money: $100,000
- Surface: Clay / outdoor
- Location: City of San Marino, San Marino
- Venue: Centro Sportivo Tennis

Champions

Singles
- (Bulgaria) Magdalena Maleeva

Doubles
- (France) Alexia Dechaume / (Argentina) Florencia Labat
← 1991 ·	WTA San Marino	· 1993 →

The 1992 Internazionali di Tennis San Marino was a women's tennis tournament played on outdoor clay courts at the Centro Sportivo Tennis in the City of San Marino, San Marino that was part of the Tier V category of the 1992 WTA Tour. It was the second edition of the WTA San Marino and was held from 20 July until 26 July 1992. First-seeded Magdalena Maleeva won the singles title and earned $18,000 first-prize money.

== Finals ==
=== Singles ===
(Bulgaria) Magdalena Maleeva defeated (Italy) Federica Bonsignori 7–6^{(7–3)}, 6–4

- It was Maleeva's first singles title of her career.

=== Doubles ===
(France) Alexia Dechaume / (Argentina) Florencia Labat defeated (Italy) Sandra Cecchini / (Italy) Laura Garrone 7–6^{(8–6)}, 7–5

== See also ==
- 1992 Internazionali di Tennis di San Marino – men's tournament
