= Mugnaini =

Mugnaini is an Italian surname. Notable people with the surname include:

- Ginevra Mugnaini (born 1973), Italian tennis player
- Guido Marcello Mugnaini (born 1940), Italian cyclist
- Joseph Mugnaini (1912–1992), Italian-born American artist and illustrator
