= Cristina Salvi =

Italian tennis player

- Country (sports): Italy
- Born: 15 May 1970 (age 55) Arezzo, Italy
- Prize money: $78,502

Singles
- Career titles: 5 ITF
- Highest ranking: No. 161 (16 September 1991)

Doubles
- Career titles: 13 ITF
- Highest ranking: No. 169 (24 August 1992)

Cristina Salvi (born 15 May 1970) is an Italian former professional tennis player.

Born in Arezzo, Salvi reached a career high ranking of 161 playing the professional tour. Her best performance on the WTA Tour was a second round appearance at the 1992 Internazionali di Tennis San Marino.

== ITF finals ==
$50,000 tournaments
$25,000 tournaments
$10,000 tournaments

=== Singles: 11 (5–6) ===
Result	No.	Date	Tournament	Surface	Opponent	Score
Loss	1.	30 July 1990	Catania, Italy	Clay	(United States) Jolene Watanabe-Giltz	1–6, 3–6
Win	1.	6 August 1990	Nicolosi, Italy	Hard	(West Germany) Caroline Schneider	6–7, 6–2, 6–4
Loss	2.	11 February 1991	Lisbon 1, Portugal	Clay	(Switzerland) Christelle Fauche	5–7, 1–6
Loss	3.	18 February 1991	Lisbon 2, Portugal	Clay	(Denmark) Sofie Albinus	4–6, 6–7^{(5)}
Loss	4.	19 August 1991	Spoleto, Italy	Clay	(Italy) Federica Bonsignori	4–6, 3–6
Win	2.	25 May 1992	Putignano, Italy	Hard	(Commonwealth of Independent States) Aida Khalatian	6–1, 6–2
Loss	5.	24 July 1995	Orbetello, Italy	Clay	(Czech Republic) Olga Hostáková	4–6, 5–7
Loss	6.	14 August 1995	Nicolosi, Italy	Hard	(Austria) Kerstin Marent	6–1, 1–6, 3–6
Win	3.	21 August 1995	Catania, Italy	Clay	(Romania) Andreea Ehritt-Vanc	6–3, 6–3
Win	4.	10 September 1995	Spoleto, Italy	Clay	(Bulgaria) Lubomira Bacheva	7–6^{(3)}, 6–3
Win	5.	25 March 1996	Caen, France	Clay	(France) Ségolène Berger	1–6, 6–3, 6–4

=== Doubles: 21 (13–8) ===
Result	No.	Date	Tournament	Surface	Partner	Opponents	Score
Win	1.	11 July 1988	Sezze, Italy	Clay	(Italy) Alessia Vesuvio	(Netherlands) Evelyne Dullens (Netherlands) Eveline Hamers	6–3, 6–3
Win	2.	31 July 1989	Pisticci, Italy	Hard	(Italy) Alessia Vesuvio	(West Germany) Caroline Schneider (Switzerland) Mareke Plocher	6–4, 6–3
Win	3.	7 August 1989	Erice, Italy	Clay	(Italy) Alessia Vesuvio	(Italy) Gloria Pizzichini (Czechoslovakia) Lucie Kořínková	3–6, 6–2, 6–3
Win	4.	21 August 1989	Nicolosi, Italy	Hard	(Italy) Alessia Vesuvio	(France) Federika Hugonnet (Spain) Susana Labrador	6–7, 7–5, 6–4
Win	5.	25 September 1989	Caltagirone, Italy	Clay	(Italy) Alessia Vesuvio	(France) Nathalie Ballet (Italy) Giovanna Carotenuto	7–5, 6–1
Loss	1.	16 July 1990	Sezze, Italy	Clay	(Italy) Alessia Vesuvio	(Italy) Antonella Canapi (Italy) Claudia Piccini	2–6, 3–6
Loss	2.	30 July 1990	Catania, Italy	Clay	(Italy) Elena Savoldi	(Italy) Antonella Canapi (Italy) Claudia Piccini	3–6, 3–6
Loss	3.	6 August 1990	Nicolosi, Italy	Hard	(West Germany) Caroline Schneider	(Australia) Justine Hodder (West Germany) Susi Lohrmann	6–3, 3–6, 3–6
Loss	4.	20 August 1990	Spoleto, Italy	Clay	(Australia) Justine Hodder	(Italy) Antonella Canapi (Italy) Claudia Piccini	3–6, 6–4, 4–6
Win	6.	10 September 1990	Agliana, Italy	Clay	(Italy) Giovanna Carotenuto	(Sweden) Catarina Bernstein (Sweden) Annika Narbe	7–5, 3–6, 7–6
Loss	5.	1 July 1991	Palermo, Italy	Clay	(Italy) Claudia Piccini	(Spain) Janet Souto (Spain) Rosa Bielsa	3–6, 2–6
Win	7.	1 June 1992	Brindisi, Italy	Clay	(Italy) Nathalie Baudone	(Czechoslovakia) Ivana Jankovská (Czechoslovakia) Eva Melicharová	4–6, 6–3, 6–2
Win	8.	23 August 1993	La Spezia, Italy	Clay	(Italy) Emanuela Brusati	(Czech Republic) Klára Bláhová (Italy) Gabriella Boschiero	7–6, 7–5
Win	9.	29 August 1994	Marina di Massa, Italy	Clay	(Italy) Emanuela Brusati	(Argentina) Veronica Stele (Argentina) Cintia Tortorella	7–5, 6–3
Loss	6.	5 September 1994	Spoleto, Italy	Clay	(Italy) Emanuela Brusati	(Italy) Flora Perfetti (Italy) Gabriella Boschiero	3–6, 4–6
Loss	7.	14 August 1995	Nicolosi, Italy	Hard	(Italy) Emanuela Brusati	(Australia) Natalie Frawley (Australia) Jenny Anne Fetch	4–6, 3–6
Win	10.	4 September 1995	Spoleto, Italy	Clay	(Italy) Elena Savoldi	(Republic of Ireland) Karen Nugent (Australia) Angie Woolcock	1–6, 7–6, 6–2
Loss	8.	24 June 1996	Orbetello, Italy	Clay	(Romania) Andreea Ehritt-Vanc	(Japan) Tomoe Hotta (Japan) Yoriko Yamagishi	6–3, 5–7, 2–6
Win	11.	3 February 1997	Mallorca 1, Spain	Clay	(Romania) Andreea Ehritt-Vanc	(Italy) Alice Canepa (Italy) Sara Ventura	6–3, 3–6, 6–2
Win	12.	10 February 1997	Mallorca 2, Spain	Clay	(Romania) Andreea Ehritt-Vanc	(Slovakia) Viviana Mracnová (Slovakia) Martina Ondrejková	6–2, 6–1
Win	13.	9 June 1997	Camucia, Italy	Hard	(Romania) Andreea Ehritt-Vanc	(Italy) Antonella Serra Zanetti (Italy) Maria-Paola Zavagli	6–4, 6–1
