= Susi Lohrmann =

German tennis player

- Full name: Susi Fortun-Lohrmann
- Country (sports): West Germany; Germany
- Residence: Leonberg, Germany
- Born: 27 March 1973 (age 51); Sankt Georgen, West Germany
- Plays: Right-handed (two-handed backhand)
- Prize money: $58,096

Singles
- Career record: 134–127
- Career titles: 6 ITF
- Highest ranking: No. 196 (20 December 1993)

Doubles
- Career record: 32–31
- Career titles: 4 ITF
- Highest ranking: No. 371 (20 August 1990)

Susi Fortun-Lohrmann (born 27 March 1973) is a German former professional tennis player.

== Biography ==
Born in Sankt Georgen, Lohrmann was a right-handed player who competed on the professional tour in the 1990s and early 2000s. Her best performance on the WTA Tour was a third round appearance Stratton Mountain in 1993, which included a win over the sixth seeded player Chanda Rubin. She reached a career-high singles ranking of 196 in the world and won six singles titles and four doubles titles on the ITF Women's Circuit.

Lohrmann, who lives in Leonberg, has been married to tennis player Martin Fortun since 2008.

She is a highly ranked player on the ITF senior's circuit, currently competing in the 45 age group.

== ITF finals ==
Legend
$25,000 tournaments
$10,000 tournaments

=== Singles (6–2) ===
Result	No.	Date	Location	Surface	Opponent	Score
Loss	1.	21 September 1992	Cluj, Romania	Clay	(Romania) Isabela Martin	4–6, 5–7
Win	2.	13 October 1996	Saint-Raphaël, France	Hard (i)	(France) Émilie Loit	5–7, 6–2, 6–0
Win	3.	21 June 1998	Biel, Switzerland	Clay	(Germany) Antonela Voina	6–2, 6–3
Win	4.	23 May 1999	Pesaro, Italy	Clay	(Russia) Ekaterina Sysoeva	6–4, 6–2
Loss	5.	20 June 1999	Lenzerheide, Switzerland	Clay	(Armenia) Marie-Gaiane Mikaelian	3–6, 4–6
Win	6.	12 September 1999	Bad Saulgau, Germany	Clay	(Estonia) Ilona Poljakova	6–0, 6–0
Win	7.	13 August 2000	Hechingen, Germany	Clay	(Germany) Syna Schmidle	6–3, 1–6, 6–3
Win	8.	3 September 2000	Bad Saulgau, Germany	Clay	(Germany) Tina Plivelitsch	6–1, 6–7^{(4–7)}, 6–4

=== Doubles (4–1) ===
Result	No.	Date	Location	Surface	Partner	Opponents	Score
Win	1.	6 August 1990	Nicolosi, Italy	Hard	(Australia) Justine Hodder	(Italy) Cristina Salvi (West Germany) Caroline Schneider	3–6, 6–3, 6–3
Win	2.	21 September 1992	Cluj, Romania	Clay	(Czechoslovakia) Martina Hautová	(Germany) Adriana Barna (Germany) Anca Barna	6–4, 6–1
Win	3.	13 October 1996	Saint-Raphaël, France	Hard (i)	(Germany) Athina Briegel	(Austria) Christina Habernigg (Slovakia) Lenka Zacharová	6–3, 7–5
Win	4.	6 October 1997	Biel, Switzerland	Carpet (i)	(Austria) Kerstin Marent	(Switzerland) Diane Asensio (Switzerland) Angela Bürgis	2–6, 6–0, 6–4
Loss	5.	13 October 1997	Saint-Raphaël, France	Hard (i)	(Austria) Kerstin Marent	(Czech Republic) Hana Šromová (Czech Republic) Alena Vašková	3–6, 3–6
