= Christelle Fauche =

Swiss tennis player (born 1973)

- Full name: Christelle Schultz Fauche
- Country (sports): Switzerland
- Born: 9 June 1973 (age 51); Paris, France
- Plays: Right-handed
- Prize money: $63,049

Singles
- Highest ranking: No. 80 (13 July 1992)

Grand Slam singles results
- Australian Open: 1R (1993)
- Wimbledon: 1R (1992)
- US Open: 1R (1992)

Doubles
- Highest ranking: No. 472 (25 March 1991)

Christelle Schultz Fauche (born 9 June 1973) is a former professional tennis player from Switzerland.

== Biography ==
Fauche was born in Paris but represented Switzerland on the professional tour, which she competed on from 1991 to 1993.

Her best results came in her home tournament in Geneva, the European Open, where she made a quarter-final appearance in 1991 and bettered that by making the semi-finals in 1992. During her run in 1992 she defeated seeded players Nicole Provis and Amanda Coetzer.

With her ranking rising in 1992 she received direct entry into Wimbledon, but came up against third seed Gabriela Sabatini who beat her in straight sets. She peaked at 80 in the world in July and appeared at both the 1992 US Open and 1993 Australian Open, for first round exits at both.

She featured in four Fed Cup ties for Switzerland, across 1992 and 1993, including a World Group fixture against the United States.

For the final year of her career she was based in the United States, training at the Hopman Academy.

Now known as Christelle Schultz, she has three children and works for the Fédération des Entreprises Romandes Genève.

== ITF finals ==
=== Singles (1–0) ===
Legend
$10,000 / $15,000 tournaments

Outcome	No.	Date	Tournament	Surface	Opponent	Score
Winner	1.	11 February 1991	Lisbon, Portugal	Clay	(Italy) Cristina Salvi	7–5, 6–1

=== Doubles (0–1) ===
Outcome	No.	Date	Tournament	Surface	Partner	Opponents	Score
Runner-up	1.	25 February 1991	Lisbon, Portugal	Clay	(Czechoslovakia) Monika Kratochvílová	(Socialist Federal Republic of Yugoslavia) Darija Dešković (Socialist Federal Republic of Yugoslavia) Karin Lušnic	4–6, 0–6
