= Monika Kratochvílová =

Czech tennis player

- Country (sports): Czechoslovakia; Czech Republic
- Born: 27 February 1974 (age 51)
- Prize money: $34,636

Singles
- Career record: 65–88
- Career titles: 1 ITF
- Highest ranking: No. 372 (16 May 1994)

Doubles
- Career record: 125–63
- Career titles: 17 ITF
- Highest ranking: No. 159 (2 December 1991)

Monika Kratochvílová (born 27 February 1974) is a Czech former professional tennis player.

Kratochvílová competed on the professional tour during the 1990s and had a career-high singles ranking of 372 in the world. She performed best in doubles, with 17 ITF titles to her name and a top ranking of 159. All of her WTA Tour main-draw appearances were in doubles, including quarterfinal appearances at Kitzbühel in 1991 and Warsaw in 1995.

== ITF finals ==
=== Singles (1–2) ===
Outcome	No.	Date	Location	Surface	Opponent	Score
Winner	1.	29 October 1990	Wels, Austria	Clay (i)	(Austria) Katharina Büche	7–5, 6–3
Runner-up	1.	2 August 1993	Staré Splavy, Czech Republic	Clay	(Czech Republic) Blanka Kumbárová	0–6, 5–7
Runner-up	2.	23 August 1993	Horb, Germany	Clay	(Netherlands) Yvette Basting	1–6, 6–7

=== Doubles (17–9) ===
Outcome	No.	Date	Location	Surface	Partner	Opponents	Score
Winner	1.	29 October 1990	Wels, Austria	Clay (i)	(Czechoslovakia) Regina Chládková	(Austria) Birgit Arming (Austria) Doris Bauer	6–4, 6–4
Runner-up	1.	11 February 1991	Lisbon, Portugal	Clay	(Czechoslovakia) Klára Bláhová	(Denmark) Merete Balling-Stockmann (Denmark) Sofie Albinus	4–6, 4–6
Winner	2.	18 February 1991	Lisbon, Portugal	Clay	(Czechoslovakia) Klára Bláhová	(Italy) Susanna Attili (Italy) Antonella Canapi	7–6^{(7–2)}, 6–7^{(5–7)}, 7–5
Runner-up	2.	25 February 1991	Lisbon, Portugal	Clay	(Switzerland) Christelle Fauche	(Socialist Federal Republic of Yugoslavia) Darija Dešković (Socialist Federal Republic of Yugoslavia) Karin Lušnic	4–6, 0–6
Winner	3.	1 April 1991	Bari, Italy	Clay	(Bulgaria) Svetlana Krivencheva	(United States) Jennifer Fuchs (Italy) Flora Perfetti	5–7, 6–2, 7–5
Winner	4.	13 May 1991	Capua, Italy	Clay	(Czechoslovakia) Janette Husárová	(Spain) María del Carmen García (Spain) Eva Jiménez	6–1, 6–1
Winner	5.	10 June 1991	Rome, Italy	Clay	(Czechoslovakia) Janette Husárová	(Italy) Gabriella Boschiero (Italy) Federica Ricadonna	6–4, 6–2
Runner-up	3.	26 August 1991	Ronchis, Italy	Clay	(Socialist Federal Republic of Yugoslavia) Maja Palaveršić	(Italy) Marzia Grossi (Italy) Barbara Romanò	4–6, 5–7
Runner-up	4.	27 April 1992	Riccione, Italy	Clay	(Croatia) Maja Palaveršić	(Italy) Gabriella Boschiero (Czech Republic) Petra Kučová	6–3, 3–6, 1–6
Runner-up	5.	8 February 1993	Faro, Portugal	Clay	(Croatia) Darija Dešković	(Netherlands) Linda Niemantsverdriet (Croatia) Maja Murić	3–6, 3–6
Winner	6.	2 August 1993	Staré Splavy, Czech Republic	Clay	(Czech Republic) Petra Raclavská	(Czech Republic) Jindra Gabrisová (Czech Republic) Dominika Gorecká	4–6, 6–2, 7–5
Winner	7.	9 August 1993	Paderborn, Germany	Clay	(Czech Republic) Olga Hostáková	(Australia) Jenny Anne Fetch (Australia) Angie Marik	6–2, 6–1
Winner	8.	16 August 1993	Bergisch Gladbach, Germany	Clay	(Slovakia) Patrícia Marková	(Czech Republic) Gabriela Chmelinová (Slovakia) Simona Nedorostová	6–3, 6–2
Winner	9.	20 September 1993	Rabac, Croatia	Clay	(Czech Republic) Olga Hostáková	(Czech Republic) Petra Holubová (Czech Republic) Helena Vildová	6–4, 6–4
Winner	10.	25 April 1994	Neudörfl, Austria	Clay	(Czech Republic) Zdeňka Málková	(Austria) Désirée Leupold (Austria) Sandra Reichel	6–0, 4–6, 6–1
Winner	11.	13 June 1994	Prostějov, Czech Republic	Clay	(Czech Republic) Martina Hautová	(Czech Republic) Lenka Cenková (Czech Republic) Alena Vašková	6–4, 6–2
Runner-up	6.	20 June 1994	Staré Splavy, Czech Republic	Clay	(Czech Republic) Martina Hautová	(Netherlands) Martine Vosseberg (Israel) Nelly Barkan	4–6, 3–6
Winner	12.	27 June 1994	Průhonice, Czech Republic	Clay	(Czech Republic) Martina Hautová	(Czech Republic) Eva Erbová (Czech Republic) Eva Krejčová	6–3, 4–6, 6–1
Winner	13.	8 August 1994	Szczecin, Poland	Clay	(Czech Republic) Martina Hautová	(Czech Republic) Eva Erbová (Czech Republic) Lucie Šteflová	6–2, 0–6, 7–6^{(7–5)}
Runner-up	7.	13 March 1995	Zaragoza, Spain	Clay	(Slovakia) Martina Nedelková	(Spain) Eva Bes (Spain) Patricia Aznar	4–6, 6–2, 2–6
Winner	14.	29 May 1995	Katowice, Poland	Clay	(Czech Republic) Hana Šromová	(Bulgaria) Galina Dimitrova (Bulgaria) Dessislava Topalova	6–3, 4–6, 6–3
Runner-up	8.	19 June 1995	Staré Splavy, Czech Republic	Clay	(Czech Republic) Petra Raclavská	(Slovakia) Michaela Hasanová (Slovakia) Martina Nedelková	3–6, 7–5, 5–7
Winner	15.	31 July 1995	Horb, Germany	Clay	(Czech Republic) Ivana Havrlíková	(Bulgaria) Pavlina Nola (Russia) Anna Linkova	6–2, 7–5
Winner	16.	21 August 1995	Wezel, Belgium	Clay	(Czech Republic) Ivana Havrlíková	(India) Nirupama Vaidyanathan (Czech Republic) Olga Hostáková	6–2, 6–3
Winner	17.	16 December 1995	Vítkovice, Czech Republic	Carpet (i)	(Slovakia) Martina Nedelková	(Czech Republic) Olga Blahotová (Czech Republic) Milena Nekvapilová	6–4, 3–6, 6–3
Runner-up	9.	4 August 1996	Horb, Germany	Clay	(Czech Republic) Olga Blahotová	(Czech Republic) Jana Ondrouchová (Czech Republic) Hana Šromová	2–6, 3–6
