= Ginevra Mugnaini =

Italian tennis player

- Country (sports): Italy
- Born: 2 April 1973 (age 51)
- Prize money: $36,985

Singles
- Career titles: 2 ITF
- Highest ranking: No. 170 (26 July 1993)

Doubles
- Highest ranking: No. 332 (1 August 1994)

Ginevra Mugnaini (born 2 April 1973) is an Italian former professional tennis player.

Mugnaini reached a best singles ranking of 170 and featured in the main draw of the 1993 San Marino Open.

On the ITF Circuit, she won two $25,000 titles, at Sezze and Cascais.

== ITF finals ==
$25,000 tournaments
$10,000 tournaments

=== Singles: 4 (2–2) ===
Result	No.	Date	Tournament	Surface	Opponent	Score
Loss	1.	22 April 1991	Riccione, Italy	Clay	(Italy) Flora Perfetti	1–6, 4–6
Loss	2.	13 May 1991	Francavilla, Italy	Clay	(Paraguay) Rossana de los Ríos	3–6, 5–7
Win	1.	22 July 1991	Sezze, Italy	Clay	(Italy) Gloria Pizzichini	6–3, 6–2
Win	2.	1 March 1993	Cascais, Portugal	Clay	(France) Sarah Pitkowski-Malcor	6–2, 6–4

=== Doubles: 2 (0–2) ===
Result	No.	Date	Tournament	Surface	Partner	Opponents	Score
Loss	1.	28 September 1992	Santa Maria Capua Vetere, Italy	Clay	(Romania) Andreea Ehritt-Vanc	(Belgium) Ann Devries (Romania) Irina Spîrlea	0–6, 0–6
Loss	2.	27 June 1994	Velp, Netherlands	Clay	(Italy) Alessia Sciarpelletti	(Netherlands) Henriëtte van Aalderen (Netherlands) Nancy van Erp	2–6, 5–7
