= Caroline Schneider =

German tennis player

- Country (sports): Germany
- Born: 1 June 1973 (age 52) Munich, West Germany
- Prize money: $256,449

Singles
- Career record: 142–283
- Career titles: 1 ITF
- Highest ranking: No. 289 (12 December 1994)

Doubles
- Career record: 202–310
- Career titles: 10 ITF
- Highest ranking: 61 (25 April 1994)

Grand Slam doubles results
- Australian Open: 2R (1998)
- French Open: 2R (1991)
- Wimbledon: 2R (1998)
- US Open: 1R (1998)

Caroline Schneider (born 1 June 1973) is a German former professional tennis player. During her career, she won several titles on the ITF Women's Circuit.

== Career highlights ==
On 25 April 1994, Schneider reached her highest doubles ranking of world No. 61. Her career-high singles ranking came on 12 December 1994, when she became world No. 289.

=== Doubles majors ===
From 1988 to 2002, Schneider competed in 20 Grand Slam doubles tournaments, but never advanced beyond the second round. She competed six times at the Australian Open, nine times at the French Open, four times at Wimbledon and once at the US Open.

=== ITF Women's doubles ===
In July 1996, with her partner Kirstin Freye, she won the $25k event in Buenos Aires. In 1997, she won the $10k event in Salzburg with Austria's Patricia Wartusch; and the $25k Kyiv event with Sweden's Annica Lindstedt. In April 2006, she partnered with Romina Oprandi to win the $25k event in Bari.

=== ITF Seniors Circuit ===
Schneider is a participant in the Seniors Circuit. She reached her highest W40 singles ranking (27) on 1 June 2010 and her highest W40 doubles ranking (132) on 30 May 2016.

== WTA Tour finals ==
Legend
Tier I
Tier II
Tier III
Tier IV & V

=== Doubles: 1 (runner-up) ===
Result	Date	Tournament	Surface	Partner	Opponents	Score
Loss	Feb 1994	Linz Open, Austria	Carpet (i)	(Sweden) Åsa Carlsson	(Russia) Eugenia Maniokova (Georgia (country)) Leila Meskhi	2–6, 2–6

== ITF Circuit finals ==
$100,000 tournaments
$75,000 tournaments
$50,000 tournaments
$25,000 tournaments
$10,000 tournaments

=== Singles (1–2) ===
Result	Date	Location	Surface	Opponent	Score
Loss	6 August 1990	Nicolosi, Italy	Hard	(Italy) Cristina Salvi	7–6, 2–6, 4–6
Loss	10 August 1992	Munich, Germany	Clay	(Germany) Eva-Maria Schürhoff	3–6, 4–6
Win	28 March 1994	Marsa, Malta	Clay	(Namibia) Elizma Nortje	7–6^{(2)}, 6–4

=== Doubles (10–14) ===
Result	No.	Date	Location	Surface	Partner	Opponents	Score
Loss	1.	30 November 1987	Budapest, Hungary	Clay	(Hungary) Petra Schmitt	(Sweden) Catrin Jexell (Sweden) Monica Lundqvist	3–6, 2–6
Win	1.	13 June 1988	Madeira, Portugal	Hard	(United States) Jackie Joseph	(Netherlands) Mara Eijkenboom (West Germany) Cora Linneman	7–6, 4–6, 8–6
Loss	2.	31 July 1989	Pisticci, Italy	Hard	(Switzerland) Mareke Plocher	(Italy) Cristina Salvi (Italy) Alessia Vesuvio	4–6, 3–6
Win	2.	4 September 1989	Agliana, Italy	Clay	(United States) Kylie Johnson	(Hungary) Andrea Noszály (Czechoslovakia) Zuzana Witzová	3–6, 6–1, 6–0
Loss	3.	30 October 1989	Pforzheim, West Germany	Hard	(United States) Elizabeth Galphin	(Soviet Union) Elena Bryukhovets (Soviet Union) Eugenia Maniokova	1–6, 1–6
Loss	4.	27 November 1989	Budapest, Hungary	Carpet (i)	(United Kingdom) Alexandra Niepel	(Soviet Union) Agnese Blumberga (West Germany) Tanja Hauschildt	3–6, 6–1, 1–6
Loss	5.	29 January 1990	Danderyd, Sweden	Hard (i)	(West Germany) Carolin Franzke	(Soviet Union) Elena Bryukhovets (Soviet Union) Eugenia Maniokova	2–6, 0–6
Loss	6.	6 August 1990	Nicolosi, Italy	Hard	(Italy) Cristina Salvi	(Australia) Justine Hodder (West Germany) Susi Lohrmann	6–3, 3–6, 3–6
Loss	7.	6 July 1992	Erlangen, Germany	Clay	(Australia) Angie Woolcock	(China) Chen Li (Japan) Miki Yokobori	4–6, 2–6
Loss	8.	10 August 1992	Munich, Germany	Clay	(Germany) Renata Kochta	(Croatia) Ivona Horvat (Greece) Christina Zachariadou	4–6, 6–3, 2–6
Win	3.	12 September 1994	Sofia, Bulgaria	Clay	(Poland) Katarzyna Teodorowicz	(Czech Republic) Petra Kučová (Czech Republic) Kateřina Kroupová	6–1, 6–1
Win	4.	22 July 1996	Buenos Aires, Argentina	Clay	(Germany) Kirstin Freye	(Argentina) María Fernanda Landa (Paraguay) Larissa Schaerer	7–6^{(4)}, 6–4
Win	5.	31 March 1997	Makarska, Croatia	Clay	(Russia) Evgenia Kulikovskaya	(Hungary) Nóra Köves (Czech Republic) Helena Vildová	6–1, 4–6, 6–4
Win	6.	19 May 1997	Brixen, Austria	Clay	(Austria) Patricia Wartusch	(Argentina) Luciana Masante (Switzerland) Miroslava Vavrinec	6–3, 6–0
Win	7.	26 May 1997	Salzburg, Austria	Clay (i)	(Austria) Patricia Wartusch	(Italy) Laura Dell'Angelo (Italy) Tathiana Garbin	1–6, 6–3, 6–3
Win	8.	8 September 1997	Kyiv, Ukraine	Clay	(Sweden) Annica Lindstedt	(Ukraine) Natalia Medvedeva (Ukraine) Angelina Zdorovitskaia	6–1, 6–2
Loss	9.	10 November 1997	Le Havre, France	Clay (i)	(Hungary) Katalin Marosi	(Austria) Melanie Schnell (United States) Julie Steven	2–6, 6–3, 6–7^{(3)}
Loss	10.	17 November 1997	Deauville, France	Carpet (i)	(Hungary) Katalin Marosi	(Germany) Julia Abe (Bulgaria) Lubomira Bacheva	2–6, 4–6
Loss	11.	6 April 1998	Estoril, Portugal	Clay	(Czech Republic) Radka Bobková	(France) Caroline Dhenin (France) Émilie Loit	2–6, 3–6
Loss	12.	16 November 1998	Caracas, Venezuela	Hard	(Canada) Maureen Drake	(Brazil) Vanessa Menga (Spain) Alicia Ortuño	3–6, 7–5, 3–6
Loss	13.	4 December 2000	Cergy-Pontoise, France	Hard (i)	(Slovenia) Maja Matevžič	(Belgium) Justine Henin (France) Virginie Razzano	2–6, 4–6
Win	9.	9 April 2001	Dinan, France	Clay (i)	(Greece) Eleni Daniilidou	(Germany) Vanessa Henke (Germany) Syna Schmidle	6–3, 7–6^{(4)}
Loss	14.	6 September 2005	Durmersheim, Germany	Clay	(Germany) Adriana Barna	(Montenegro) Danica Krstajić (Russia) Elena Chalova	6–4, 4–6, 4–6
Win	10.	18 April 2006	Bari, Italy	Clay	(Switzerland) Romina Oprandi	(Austria) Stefanie Haidner (Croatia) Darija Jurak	7–5, 6–2
