= Veronica Stele =

Argentine tennis player

- Country (sports): Argentina
- Born: 19 November 1977 (age 47)
- Turned pro: 1992
- Retired: 1999
- Prize money: $47,266

Singles
- Career record: 118–91
- Career titles: 2 ITF
- Highest ranking: No. 237 (19 May 1997)

Doubles
- Career record: 127–69
- Career titles: 11 ITF
- Highest ranking: No. 117 (7 July 1997)

Veronica Stele (born 19 November 1977) is a former professional tennis player from Argentina. Occasionally, she also participates in basque pelota competitions.

== Career highlights ==
On 19 May 1997, Stele reached her highest singles ranking of world No. 237. Her career-high doubles ranking came on 7 July 1997, when she became world No. 117. In her career, she won two singles and 11 doubles titles on the ITF Circuit.

=== ITF doubles titles ===
In 1997, Stele and her partner Katalin Marosi won the doubles title at the $50k tournament at Budapest, Hungary, and the $50k event at Marseille, France.

== ITF Circuit finals ==
$50,000 tournaments
$25,000 tournaments
$10,000 tournaments

=== Singles (2–4) ===
Result	No.	Date	Tournament	Surface	Opponent	Score
Win	1.	21 May 1995	ITF Tortosa, Spain	Clay	(Czech Republic) Lenka Němečková	6–2, 2–6, 6–4
Loss	1.	15 September 1996	ITF Buenos Aires, Argentina	Clay	(Argentina) Celeste Contín	5–7, 6–7
Loss	2.	22 September 1996	ITF Asunción, Paraguay	Clay	(Paraguay) Larissa Schaerer	5–7, 7–5, 2–6
Loss	3.	11 May 1997	ITF Tortosa, Spain	Clay	(Spain) Nuria Montero	3–6, 1–6
Win	2.	27 April 1998	ITF San Severo, Italy	Clay	(Italy) Katia Piccolini	6–4, 6–3
Loss	4.	24 May 1998	ITF Zaragoza, Spain	Clay	(France) Sylvie Sallaberry	5–7, 4–6

=== Doubles (11–12) ===
Result	No.	Date	Tournament	Surface	Partner	Opponents	Score
Win	1.	20 September 1993	ITF Guayaquil, Ecuador	Clay	(Argentina) Cintia Tortorella	(Chile) Paula Cabezas (Ecuador) Nuria Niemes	6–2, 6–1
Loss	1.	24 October 1993	ITF Buenos Aires, Argentina	Clay	(Argentina) Valeria Strappa	(Argentina) Mariana Díaz Oliva (Argentina) Laura Montalvo	2–6, 7–5, 1–6
Loss	2.	22 November 1993	ITF Buenos Aires, Argentina	Clay	(Argentina) Cintia Tortorella	(Argentina) Laura Montalvo (Belgium) Vanessa Matthys	3–6, 6–7^{(5–7)}
Loss	3.	29 August 1994	ITF Massa, Italy	Clay	(Argentina) Cintia Tortorella	(Italy) Cristina Salvi (Italy) Emanuela Brusati	5–7, 3–6
Win	2.	19 September 1994	ITF Poreč, Croatia	Clay	(Argentina) Cintia Tortorella	(Czech Republic) Zuzana Lešenarová (Czech Republic) Karolina Petříková	6–3, 6–2
Win	3.	17 April 1995	ITF Murcia, Spain	Clay	(Argentina) Mariana Eberle	(Italy) Federica Bonsignori (Italy) Gloria Pizzichini	7–5, 6–2
Loss	4.	22 May 1995	ITF Barcelona, Spain	Clay	(Argentina) Florencia Cianfagna	(Spain) Estefanía Bottini (Spain) Gala León García	5–7, 5–7
Loss	5.	17 December 1995	ITF Tucumán, Argentina	Clay	(Paraguay) Larissa Schaerer	(Argentina) Laura Montalvo (Argentina) Paola Suárez	2–6, 6–7
Win	4.	16 June 1996	ITF Salzburg, Austria	Clay	(Spain) Alicia Ortuño	(Monaco) Emmanuelle Gagliardi (Portugal) Sofia Prazeres	6–0, 6–4
Loss	6.	7 July 1996	ITF Sezze, Italy	Clay	(Italy) Gabriella Boschiero	(San Marino) Francesca Guardigli (Romania) Andreea Vanc	6–0, 2–6, 3–6
Win	5.	14 July 1996	ITF Vigo, Spain	Clay	(Spain) Alicia Ortuño	(Israel) Nataly Cahana (Israel) Hila Rosen	6–2, 6–4
Win	6.	21 July 1996	ITF Bilbao, Spain	Clay	(Spain) Alicia Ortuño	(Spain) Marta Cano (Spain) Nuria Montero	6–3, 6–4
Loss	7.	6 October 1996	ITF Puerto Vallarta, Mexico	Hard	(Chile) Paula Cabezas	(Argentina) María Fernanda Landa (Germany) Marlene Weingärtner	6–4, 5–7, 3–6
Win	7.	7 April 1997	ITF Viña del Mar, Chile	Clay	(Hungary) Katalin Marosi	(Argentina) Celeste Contín (Argentina) Luciana Masante	6–1, 5–7, 6–2
Loss	8.	11 May 1997	ITF Tortosa, Spain	Clay	(Brazil) Miriam D'Agostini	(Spain) Marta Cano (Spain) Nuria Montero	3–6, 6–1, 4–6
Loss	9.	18 May 1997	ITF Le Touquet, France	Clay	(Argentina) Luciana Masante	(United States) Nicole Arendt (France) Magalie Lamarre	2–6, 3–6
Loss	10.	26 May 1997	ITF Barcelona, Spain	Clay	(Hungary) Katalin Marosi	(Netherlands) Kim de Weille (Netherlands) Amanda Hopmans	4–6, 7–5, 4–6
Win	8.	9 June 1997	ITF Budapest, Hungary	Clay	(Hungary) Katalin Marosi	(Ukraine) Elena Tatarkova (Colombia) Fabiola Zuluaga	6–3, 6–3
Win	9.	16 June 1997	Open de Marseille, France	Clay	(Hungary) Katalin Marosi	(France) Caroline Dhenin (Georgia (country)) Nino Louarsabishvili	6–2, 4–6, 6–1
Win	10.	30 June 1997	ITF Mont-de-Marsan, France	Hard	(Hungary) Katalin Marosi	(Japan) Saori Obata (Japan) Nami Urabe	6–4, 6–3
Win	11.	26 April 1998	ITF Bari, Italy	Clay	(Spain) Rosa María Andrés Rodríguez	(Italy) Sabina Da Ponte (Slovakia) Silvia Uríčková	6–1, 6–1
Loss	11.	3 May 1998	ITF San Severo, Italy	Clay	(Colombia) Giana Gutiérrez	(Argentina) Romina Ottoboni (Brazil) Eugenia Maia	6–1, 5–7, 5–7
Loss	12.	18 May 1998	ITF Zaragoza, Spain	Clay	(Spain) Lourdes Domínguez Lino	(Spain) Gisela Riera (Switzerland) Aliénor Tricerri	4–6, 1–6

== Basque pelota ==
At the 2011 Pan American Games in Guadalajara, Mexico, Stele partnered with María Lis García to win the gold medal in Basque pelota.
