= Cintia Tortorella =

Argentine tennis player

- Country (sports): Argentina
- Born: 10 December 1976 (age 48)
- Plays: Right-handed
- Prize money: $47,143

Singles
- Career record: 134–103
- Career titles: 3 ITF
- Highest ranking: No. 224 (5 August 1996)

Doubles
- Career record: 88–70
- Career titles: 6 ITF
- Highest ranking: No. 185 (5 August 1996)

Cintia Tortorella (born 10 December 1976) is an Argentine former professional tennis player.

A right-handed player from Buenos Aires, Tortorella reached a best singles ranking of 224 while competing on the professional tour in the 1990s and won three ITF titles. As a doubles player, she made a WTA Tour main-draw appearance at the 1995 Spanish Open, and won a further six ITF tournaments.

Tortorella left the tour in 1998 and played college tennis that year in San Diego for United States International University, before transferring to Pepperdine University for the next three seasons. She was All-WCC for singles at Pepperdine in 2000 and 2001.

== ITF Circuit finals ==
Legend
$25,000 tournaments
$10,000 tournaments

=== Singles: 11 (3–8) ===
Result	No.	Date	Tournament	Surface	Opponent	Score
Loss	1.	4 November 1991	ITF Florianópolis, Brazil	Clay	(Argentina) Paola Suárez	3–6, 3–6
Win	1.	3 May 1993	ITF Buenos Aires, Argentina	Clay	(Paraguay) Magalí Benítez	4–6, 6–1, 6–1
Win	2.	27 September 1993	ITF Lima, Peru	Clay	(Argentina) Mariana Randrup	4–6, 6–2, 6–4
Loss	2.	11 October 1993	ITF Santiago, Chile	Clay	(Chile) Paula Cabezas	3–6, 4–6
Loss	3.	1 November 1993	ITF Asunción, Paraguay	Clay	(Argentina) Laura Montalvo	3–6, 6–2, 4–6
Loss	4.	16 May 1994	ITF Tortosa, Spain	Clay	(Hong Kong) Tang Min	6–7^{(5)}, 3–6
Loss	5.	31 October 1994	ITF Montevideo, Uruguay	Clay	(France) Virginie Massart	7–6^{(3)}, 1–6, 2–6
Loss	6.	14 August 1995	ITF Carthage, Tunisia	Clay	(Belgium) Stephanie Devillé	2–6, 5–7
Loss	7.	27 May 1996	ITF Buenos Aires, Argentina	Clay	(Argentina) María Fernanda Landa	2–6, 2–6
Win	3.	1 June 1997	ITF San Salvador, El Salvador	Clay	(Brazil) Miriam D'Agostini	6–7^{(2)}, 6–4, 6–3
Loss	8.	23 June 1997	ITF Manaus, Brazil	Hard	(Canada) Martina Nejedly	4–6, 1–6

=== Doubles: 14 (6–8) ===
Result	No.	Date	Tournament	Surface	Partner	Opponents	Score
Win	1.	2 September 1991	ITF São Paulo, Brazil	Clay	(Argentina) María José Gaidano	(Paraguay) Rossana de los Ríos (Paraguay) Larissa Schaerer	7–6^{(2)}, 6–4
Loss	1.	21 June 1993	ITF Covilhã, Portugal	Clay	(Argentina) Maria Ines Araiz	(Netherlands) Evelyne Dullens (Netherlands) Nathalie Thijssen	1–6, 6–4, 3–6
Win	2.	20 September 1993	ITF Guayaquil, Ecuador	Clay	(Argentina) Veronica Stele	(Chile) Paula Cabezas (Ecuador) Nuria Niemes	6–2, 6–1
Loss	2.	22 November 1993	ITF Buenos Aires, Argentina	Clay	(Argentina) Veronica Stele	(Argentina) Laura Montalvo (Belgium) Vanessa Matthys	3–6, 6–7^{(5)}
Loss	3.	9 May 1994	ITF Mollet, Spain	Clay	(Argentina) Mariana Randrup	(Spain) Cristina Torrens Valero (Spain) Alicia Ortuño	4–6, 0–6
Loss	4.	29 August 1994	ITF Marina di Massa, Italy	Clay	(Argentina) Veronica Stele	(Italy) Cristina Salvi (Italy) Emanuela Brusati	5–7, 3–6
Win	3.	19 September 1994	ITF Poreč, Croatia	Clay	(Argentina) Veronica Stele	(Czech Republic) Zuzana Lešenarová (Czech Republic) Karolina Petříková	6–3, 6–2
Win	4.	23 October 1995	ITF Buenos Aires, Argentina	Clay	(Argentina) Paola Suárez	(Argentina) Mariana Lopez Palacios (Argentina) Mariana Díaz Oliva	6–2, 6–2
Loss	5.	6 November 1995	ITF São Paulo, Brazil	Clay	(Argentina) Laura Montalvo	(Hungary) Katalin Marosi (Brazil) Miriam D'Agostini	1–6, 6–1, 5–7
Loss	6.	20 May 1996	ITF Buenos Aires, Argentina	Clay	(Argentina) María Fernanda Landa	(Argentina) Mariana Faustinelli (Argentina) Lorena Martinez	2–6, 5–7
Win	5.	1 June 1997	ITF San Salvador, El Salvador	Clay	(Brazil) Miriam D'Agostini	(United States) Jacquelyn Rosen (Peru) María Eugenia Rojas	6–4, 6–0
Win	6.	30 June 1997	ITF Campinas, Brazil	Clay	(Paraguay) Larissa Schaerer	(Brazil) Roberta Burzagli (Brazil) Joana Cortez	5–7, 6–3, 6–3
Loss	7.	23 November 1997	ITF São Paulo, Brazil	Clay	(Argentina) Celeste Contín	(Brazil) Vanessa Menga (Brazil) Miriam D'Agostini	1–6, 3–6
Loss	8.	30 June 2003	ITF Waco, United States	Hard	(Germany) Kim Niggemeyer	(United States) Ahsha Rolle (Jamaica) Alanna Broderick	6–7^{(7)}, 2–6
