= Justine Hodder =

Australian tennis player (born 1972)

- Country (sports): Australia
- Born: 10 March 1972 (age 53)
- Prize money: $46,162

Singles
- Career record: 41–76
- Career titles: 0
- Highest ranking: No. 404 (7 January 1991)

Grand Slam singles results
- Australian Open: 1R (1990)

Doubles
- Career record: 102–86
- Career titles: 8 ITF
- Highest ranking: No. 113 (15 February 1993)

Grand Slam doubles results
- Australian Open: 2R (1990, 1993)
- French Open: 1R (1992, 1993)
- Wimbledon: 1R (1990, 1992, 1993)

Justine Hodder (born 10 March 1972) is an Australian former professional tennis player.

== Tennis career ==
Hodder and Nicole Pratt were runners-up in the junior doubles final at the 1990 Australian Open.

== ITF finals ==
$50,000 tournaments
$25,000 tournaments
$10,000 tournaments

=== Doubles: 18 (8–10) ===
Outcome	No.	Date	Tournament	Surface	Partner	Opponents	Score
Winner	1.	3 July 1989	ITF Knoxville, United States	Hard	(United States) Audra Keller	(United States) Jessica Emmons (United States) Shawn Foltz	6–4, 0–6, 6–4
Runner-up	1.	6 November 1989	ITF Nuriootpa, Australia	Hard	(Australia) Kelli-Ann Johnston	(Indonesia) Yayuk Basuki (Indonesia) Suzanna Wibowo	3–6, 4–6
Runner-up	2.	27 November 1989	ITF Melbourne, Australia	Hard	(United States) Allison Cooper	(Australia) Danielle Jones (Hong Kong) Paulette Moreno	2–6, 2–6
Runner-up	3.	28 May 1990	ITF Lisbon, Portugal	Clay	(Netherlands) Ingelise Driehuis	(Spain) Ana-Belén Quintana (Spain) Ana Segura	0–6, 2–6
Winner	2.	4 June 1990	ITF Lisbon, Portugal	Clay	(Netherlands) Ingelise Driehuis	(Spain) Ana-Belén Quintana (Spain) Ana Segura	6–3, 6–3
Winner	3.	6 August 1990	ITF Nicolosi, Italy	Hard	(West Germany) Susi Lohrmann	(Italy) Cristina Salvi (West Germany) Caroline Schneider	3–6, 6–3, 6–3
Runner-up	4.	20 August 1990	ITF Spoleto, Italy	Clay	(Italy) Cristina Salvi	(Italy) Antonella Canapi (Italy) Claudia Piccini	3–6, 6–4, 4–6
Runner-up	5.	12 November 1990	ITF Mount Gambier, Australia	Hard	(Australia) Kerry-Anne Guse	(Australia) Jo-Anne Faull (France) Noëlle van Lottum	5–7, 4–6
Winner	4.	4 February 1991	ITF Jakarta, Indonesia	Clay	(Australia) Kerry-Anne Guse	(Japan) Ei Iida (Japan) Misumi Miyauchi	7–6^{(2)}, 7–5
Runner-up	6.	22 July 1991	ITF Sezze, Italy	Clay	(Netherlands) Ingelise Driehuis	(Australia) Danielle Jones (Australia) Louise Pleming	3–6, 2–6
Winner	5.	29 July 1991	ITF Acireale, Italy	Clay	(Australia) Danielle Jones	(Italy) Gabriella Boschiero (United States) Kylie Johnson	6–4, 6–4
Winner	6.	12 August 1991	ITF Pisticci, Italy	Hard	(Croatia) Maja Murić	(Romania) Ruxandra Dragomir (Romania) Irina Spîrlea	6–4, 3–6, 6–3
Runner-up	7.	4 November 1991	ITF Port Pirie, Australia	Hard	(Australia) Kerry-Anne Guse	(Australia) Jo-Anne Faull (Australia) Michelle Jaggard-Lai	2–6, 5–7
Winner	7.	20 April 1992	ITF Bari, Italy	Clay	(Australia) Kirrily Sharpe	(Czechoslovakia) Eva Martincová (Czechoslovakia) Kateřina Kroupová-Šišková	6–2, 6–3
Runner-up	8.	13 July 1992	ITF Sezze, Italy	Clay	(Australia) Kirrily Sharpe	(Czechoslovakia) Ivana Jankovská (Czechoslovakia) Eva Melicharová	6–7^{(1)}, 7–5, 5–7
Winner	8.	14 December 1992	ITF Kooyong, Australia	Grass	(Australia) Angie Woolcock	(Australia) Kerry-Anne Guse (Australia) Kristine Kunce	6–4, 3–6, 6–2
Runner-up	9.	22 March 1993	ITF St. Simons, United States	Clay	(Slovakia) Janette Husárová	(Canada) Mélanie Bernard (Canada) Caroline Delisle	5–7, 6–3, 4–6
Runner-up	10.	18 July 1994	ITF Ilkley, United Kingdom	Grass	(Australia) Kirrily Sharpe	(United Kingdom) Shirli-Ann Siddall (United Kingdom) Jo Durie	7–5, 4–6, 4–6
