= Francesca Guardigli =

Sammarinese tennis player

- Country (sports): San Marino
- Born: 10 April 1973 (age 51)
- Prize money: $19,061

Singles
- Career record: 46–87
- Career titles: 0
- Highest ranking: 448 (4 August 1997)

Doubles
- Career record: 49–49
- Career titles: 5 ITF
- Highest ranking: 234 (5 May 1997)

Team competitions
- Fed Cup: 5–5

Francesca Guardigli (born 10 April 1973) is a former Sammarinese tennis player. She won a total of five ITF doubles titles during her career and on 5 May 1997 reached a doubles ranking high of world number 234.

In May 1997, Guardigli played ten rubbers for the San Marino Fed Cup team for an overall personal record of 5–5.

== ITF finals ==
=== Singles (0–1) ===
Legend $100,000 tournaments $75,000 tournaments $50,000 tournaments $25,000 tournaments $10,000 tournaments	Finals by surface Hard (0–0) Clay (0–1) Grass (0–0) Carpet (0–0)

Result	No.	Date	Tournament	Surface	Opponent	Score
Loss	1.	17 May 1993	Salerno, Italy	Clay	(Italy) Stefania Indemini	6–4, 3–6, 5–7

=== Doubles (5–1) ===
Legend $100,000 tournaments $75,000 tournaments $50,000 tournaments $25,000 tournaments $10,000 tournaments	Finals by surface Hard (0–0) Clay (5–1) Grass (0–0) Carpet (0–0)

Result	No.	Date	Tournament	Surface	Partner	Opponents	Score
Win	1.	17 May 1993	Salerno, Italy	Clay	(Italy) Alessia Vesuvio	(Italy) Manuela Bargis (Italy) Stefania Indemini	6–3, 6–2
Win	2.	1 July 1996	Sezze, Italy	Clay (i)	(Romania) Andreea Vanc	(Italy) Gabriella Boschiero (Argentina) Veronica Stele	0–6, 6–2, 6–3
Win	3.	5 August 1996	Catania, Italy	Clay	(Italy) Tathiana Garbin	(Netherlands) Debby Haak (Netherlands) Franke Joosten	6–2, 7–5
Win	4.	12 May 1997	Novi Sad, Serbia and Montenegro	Clay	(Italy) Tathiana Garbin	(Bulgaria) Teodora Nedeva (Serbia and Montenegro) Dragana Zarić	6–4, 6–4
Win	5.	23 August 1999	Skiathos, Greece	Clay	(Slovakia) Andrea Šebová	(Austria) Nicole Melch (United Kingdom) Nicola Payne	6–4, 6–4
Loss	1.	22 May 2000	Biella, Italy	Clay	(Italy) Anna Floris	(Germany) Kirstin Freye (Hungary) Adrienn Hegedűs	2–6, 4–6
