= Klára Bláhová =

Czech tennis player

- Country (sports): Czechoslovakia; Czech Republic
- Born: 2 April 1973 (age 51)
- Prize money: US$25,353

Singles
- Career record: 77–52
- Career titles: 1 ITF
- Highest ranking: No. 194 (19 July 1993)

Doubles
- Career record: 40–32
- Career titles: 3 ITF
- Highest ranking: No. 209 (12 July 1993)

Klára Bláhová (born 2 April 1973) is a Czech former professional tennis player.

Bláhová made her only WTA Tour main-draw appearance at the 1993 San Marino Open, when she featured as a qualifier and was beaten in the first round by Joannette Kruger.

== ITF Circuit finals ==
$25,000 tournaments
$10,000 tournaments

=== Singles: 4 (1–3) ===
Result	No.	Date	Tournament	Surface	Opponent	Score
Loss	1.	10 September 1990	ITF Agliana, Italy	Clay	(Sweden) Teresa Strömberg	3–6, 1–6
Loss	2.	17 September 1990	ITF Naples, Italy	Clay	(Belgium) Dominique Monami	3–6, 2–6
Loss	3.	26 November 1990	ITF Érd, Hungary	Clay	(Czechoslovakia) Helena Vildová	2–6, 3–6
Win	1.	27 June 1994	ITF Průhonice, Czech Republic	Clay	(Czech Republic) Eva Krejčová	7–6^{(2)}, 6–4

=== Doubles: 6 (3–3) ===
Result	No.	Date	Tournament	Surface	Partner	Opponents	Score
Loss	1.	24 September 1990	ITF Naples, Italy	Clay	(Switzerland) Natalie Tschan	(Czechoslovakia) Lucie Ludvigová (Czechoslovakia) Helena Vildová	3–6, 2–6
Loss	2.	11 February 1991	ITF Lisbon, Portugal	Clay	(Czechoslovakia) Monika Kratochvílová	(Denmark) Merete Balling-Stockmann (Denmark) Sofie Albinus	4–6, 4–6
Win	1.	18 February 1991	ITF Lisbon, Portugal	Clay	(Czechoslovakia) Monika Kratochvílová	(Italy) Susanna Attili (Italy) Antonella Canapi	7–6^{(2)}, 6–7^{(5)}, 7–5
Win	2.	27 July 1992	ITF Rheda-Wiedenbrück, Germany	Clay	(Czechoslovakia) Zdeňka Málková	(Czechoslovakia) Eva Martincová (Czechoslovakia) Sylvia Štefková	7–6^{(5)}, 6–4
Win	3.	29 March 1993	ITF Marsa, Malta	Clay	(Croatia) Maja Murić	(Hungary) Virág Csurgó (Slovenia) Tjaša Jezernik	6–3, 5–7, 6–3
Loss	3.	23 August 1993	ITF La Spezia, Italy	Clay	(Italy) Gabriella Boschiero	(Italy) Emanuela Brusati (Italy) Cristina Salvi	6–7, 5–7
