= Barbara Rittner =

German tennis player (born 1973)

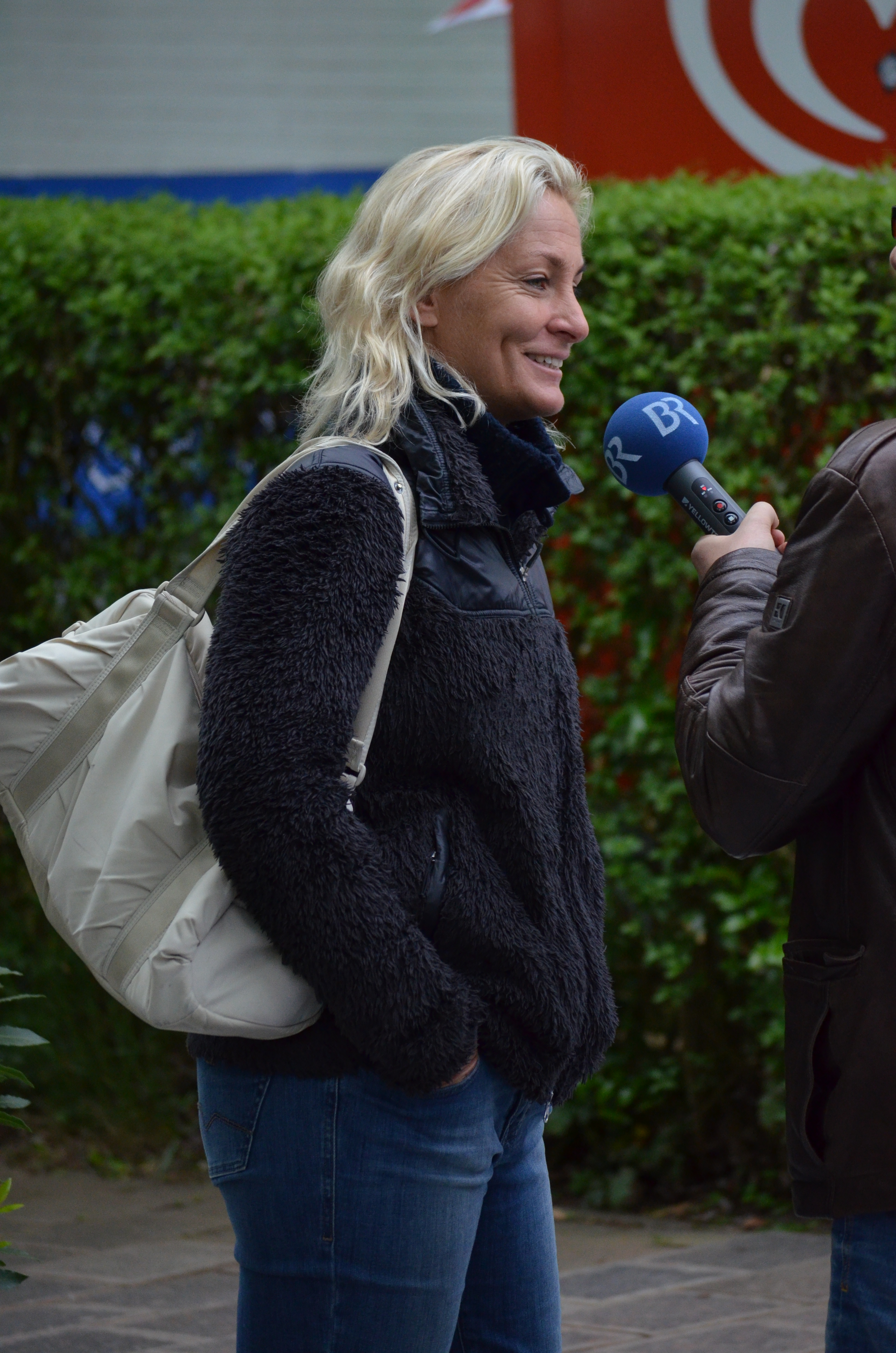
- Barbara Rittner, 2014
- Country (sports): Germany
- Residence: Cologne, Germany
- Born: 25 April 1973 (age 53) Krefeld, West Germany
- Height: 1.73 m (5 ft 8 in)
- Turned pro: 1 August 1989
- Retired: 2005
- Plays: Right-handed (two-handed backhand)
- Prize money: $1,829,648

Singles
- Career record: 314–275
- Career titles: 2 WTA, 2 ITF
- Highest ranking: No. 24 (1 February 1993)

Grand Slam singles results
- Australian Open: 4R (2001)
- French Open: 4R (1996)
- Wimbledon: 3R (1992, 1994)
- US Open: 3R (1991, 1993, 1994, 1996)

Doubles
- Career record: 184–209
- Career titles: 3 WTA, 1 ITF
- Highest ranking: No. 23 (18 March 2002)

Grand Slam doubles results
- Australian Open: 3R (1997, 2003)
- French Open: 3R (1992, 2001)
- Wimbledon: 3R (1992, 2001)
- US Open: 3R (2001)

Grand Slam mixed doubles results
- French Open: 3R (1997)
- Wimbledon: QF (1999)

Barbara Rittner (born 25 April 1973) is a German former professional tennis player. She currently is the captain of the German Fed Cup team. Her career-high singles ranking was No. 24 in the world, achieved on 1 February 1993.

As a junior, she won the 1991 Wimbledon Championships. She won her first WTA Tour title in 1992, and almost nine years later, she won her second at the Belgian Open in Antwerp. This marked the second longest time between singles titles in the Open Era (behind Marcie Louie, who captured her second title 9 1/2 years after her first one). She also won three doubles titles with three different partners.

She reached the fourth round of a Grand Slam tournament twice in her professional career; once at the French Open in 1996, and again at the Australian Open in 2001. Her best performances at Wimbledon and the US Open are the third round in both.

At 's-Hertogenbosch in 2003, as a main-draw alternate, she recorded the best win of her career over the then-sixth ranked Amélie Mauresmo before losing to Kim Clijsters. Earlier in the year, she achieved her first career top-ten win over Jelena Dokić at Indian Wells.

In January 2005, she became captain of the German Fed Cup team.

== WTA Tour career finals ==
=== Singles (2–3) ===
Legend
Grand Slam (0)
WTA Championships (0)
Tier I (0)
Tier II (0)
Tier III (0)
Tier IV, V (2)

Result	W/L	Date	Tournament	Surface	Opponent	Score
Loss	0–1	Sep 1991	St. Petersburg, USSR	Carpet (i)	(Soviet Union) Larisa Neiland	6–3, 3–6, 4–6
Win	1–1	Aug 1992	Schenectady, United States	Hard	(Netherlands) Brenda Schultz	7–6^{(7–3)}, 6–3
Loss	1–2	Jul 1993	San Marino	Clay	(Italy) Marzia Grossi	6–3, 5–7, 1–6
Loss	1–3	Feb 1995	Linz, Austria	Carpet (i)	(Czech Republic) Jana Novotná	7–6^{(8–6)}, 3–6, 4–6
Win	2–3	May 2001	Antwerp, Belgium	Clay	(Czech Republic) Klára Koukalová	6–3, 6–2

=== Doubles (3–10) ===
Result	W/L	Date	Tournament	Surface	Partner	Opponents	Score
Win	1–0	Feb 1992	Essen, Germany	Carpet (i)	(Bulgaria) Katerina Maleeva	(Belgium) Sabine Appelmans (Germany) Claudia Porwik	7–5, 6–3
Loss	1–1	May 1992	Rome, Italy	Clay	(Bulgaria) Katerina Maleeva	(Socialist Federal Republic of Yugoslavia) Monica Seles (Czech Republic) Helena Suková	1–6, 2–6
Loss	1–2	Aug 1993	San Marino	Clay	(Argentina) Florencia Labat	(Italy) Sandra Cecchini (Argentina) Patricia Tarabini	3–6, 2–6
Loss	1–3	Aug 1993	Schenectady, United States	Hard	(Argentina) Florencia Labat	(Australia) Rachel McQuillan (Germany) Claudia Porwik	6–4, 4–6, 2–6
Loss	1–4	Jul 1996	Palermo, Italy	Clay	(Argentina) Florencia Labat	(Slovakia) Janette Husárová (Austria) Barbara Schett	1–6, 2–6
Loss	1–5	Oct 1996	SEAT Open, Luxembourg	Carpet (i)	(Belgium) Dominique Monami	(Netherlands) Kristie Boogert (France) Nathalie Tauziat	6–2, 4–6, 2–6
Loss	1–6	Jan 1997	Hobart, Australia	Hard	(Belgium) Dominique Monami	(Japan) Naoko Kijimuta (Japan) Nana Miyagi	3–6, 1–6
Win	2–6	Apr 2001	Estoril, Portugal	Clay	(Czech Republic) Květa Peschke	(Slovenia) Tina Križan (Slovenia) Katarina Srebotnik	6–3, 6–2
Loss	2–7	May 2001	Hamburg, Germany	Clay	(Czech Republic) Květa Peschke	(Zimbabwe) Cara Black (Russia) Elena Likhovtseva	2–6, 6–4, 2–6
Loss	2–8	Sep 2001	Leipzig, Germany	Hard (i)	(Czech Republic) Květa Peschke	(Russia) Elena Likhovtseva (France) Nathalie Tauziat	4–6, 2–6
Win	3–8	Feb 2002	Dubai, United Arab Emirates	Hard	(Venezuela) María Vento-Kabchi	(France) Sandrine Testud (Italy) Roberta Vinci	6–3, 6–2
Loss	3–9	Apr 2002	Estoril, Portugal	Clay	(Venezuela) María Vento-Kabchi	(Russia) Elena Bovina (Hungary) Zsófia Gubacsi	3–6, 1–6
Loss	3–10	Oct 2002	Luxembourg City, Luxembourg	Hard (i)	(Czech Republic) Květa Peschke	(Belgium) Kim Clijsters (Slovakia) Janette Husárová	6–4, 3–6, 5–7

== ITF finals ==
=== Singles (2–2) ===
Legend
$50,000 tournaments
$10,000 tournaments

Result	No.	Date	Tournament	Surface	Opponent	Score
Win	1.	6 November 1989	Fez, Morocco	Clay	(Netherlands) Judith Warringa	6–7, 6–3, 9–7
Win	2.	5 February 1990	Stavanger, Norway	Carpet (i)	(Norway) Amy Jönsson Raaholt	6–3, 6–7, 4–6
Loss	3.	12 February 1990	Horsholm, Denmark	Carpet (i)	(Czechoslovakia) Petra Holubová	4–6, 2–6
Loss	4.	30 July 2000	Liège, Belgium	Clay	(Belgium) Justine Henin	0–6, 1–3 ret.

=== Doubles (1–2) ===
Result	No.	Date	Tournament	Surface	Partner	Opponents	Score
Loss	1.	6 November 1989	Fez, Morocco	Clay	(West Germany) Petra Kemper	(Czechoslovakia) Lucie Kořínková (Italy) Flora Perfetti	1–6, 2–6
Loss	2.	5 February 1990	Stavanger, Norway	Carpet (i)	(West Germany) Heike Thoms	(Soviet Union) Elena Brioukhovets (Sweden) Nina Erickson	2–6, 2–6
Win	3.	15 April 1990	Bari, Italy	Clay	(Soviet Union) Agnese Gustmane	(Indonesia) Yayuk Basuki (Indonesia) Suzanna Wibowo	6–4, 4–6, 6–2
