= Maja Živec-Škulj =

German tennis player

- Full name: Maja Živec-Škulj
- Country (sports): Germany
- Born: 25 September 1973 (age 51); Ljubljana, SR Slovenia; Yugoslavia
- Prize money: $183,901

Singles
- Career record: 169–144
- Highest ranking: No. 73 (4 January 1993)

Grand Slam singles results
- Australian Open: 1R (1991, 1992, 1993)
- Wimbledon: 1R (1993)

Doubles
- Career record: 69–78
- Highest ranking: No. 96 (25 April 1994)

Grand Slam doubles results
- Australian Open: 2R (1993)
- French Open: 1R (1994)
- US Open: 1R (1993)

Maja Živec-Škulj (born 25 September 1973) is a former professional tennis player from Germany.

== Biography ==
Živec-Škulj was born in the Slovenian city of Ljubljana, then part of Yugoslavia, but later emigrated to West Germany.

She was a member of the West German side, along with Anke Huber and Katharina Düll, which defeated Czechoslovakia to win the Junior Fed Cup in 1989. Her junior career also included a quarter-final appearance in the girls' singles at the 1991 Australian Open and she featured as well in the women's singles main draw for the first time that year.

At the 1992 Australian Open, her first round opponent was 12th seed Anke Huber, who she managed to take a set off before losing in three. She broke into the top 100 during the 1992 season and peaked at 73 in the world early in 1993. Her best performance on the WTA Tour came at Curitaba in 1993 where she was a quarter-finalist. She competed in the main draw of both the Australian Open and Wimbledon in 1993.

As a doubles player she reached as high as 96 in the rankings. She made two WTA Tour semi-finals, at Kitzbuhel in 1993 and Beijing in 1994.

== ITF finals ==
=== Singles: 9 (4–5) ===
$100,000 tournaments
$75,000 tournaments
$50,000 tournaments
$25,000 tournaments
$10,000 tournaments

| Outcome | No. | Date | Tournament | Surface | Opponent | Score |
|---|---|---|---|---|---|---|
| Runner-up | 1. | 22 August 1988 | Rebecq, Belgium | Clay | (France) Catherine Mothes | 6–2, 1–6, 0–6 |
| Winner | 2. | 21 August 1989 | Neumünster, West Germany | Clay | (West Germany) Marketa Kochta | 2–6, 6–4, 6–3 |
| Winner | 3. | 8 July 1991 | Erlangen, Germany | Clay | (Czechoslovakia) Denisa Krajčovičová | 7–5, 1–6, 6–1 |
| Runner-up | 4. | 15 July 1991 | Darmstadt, Germany | Clay | (Germany) Martina Pawlik | 6–1, 3–6, 6–7 |
| Runner-up | 5. | 4 May 1992 | Porto, Portugal | Clay | (Hungary) Anna Földényi | 2–6, 3–6 |
| Winner | 6. | 17 August 1992 | Spoleto, Italy | Clay | (Belgium) Sandra Wasserman | 6–0, 7–6^{(6)} |
| Runner-up | 7. | 29 August 1994 | Maribor, Slovenia | Hard (i) | (Austria) Barbara Paulus | 6–4, 4–6, 0–6 |
| Winner | 8. | 14 October 1996 | Samara, Russia | Clay | (Russia) Elena Voropaeva | 3–6, 6–3, 6–2 |
| Runner-up | 9. | 4 Aug 1997 | Carthage, Tunisia | Clay | (Germany) Sandra Klösel | 6–3, 5–7, 0–6 |

=== Doubles: 5 (2–3) ===
$100,000 tournaments
$75,000 tournaments
$50,000 tournaments
$25,000 tournaments
$10,000 tournaments

| Outcome | No. | Date | Tournament | Surface | Partner | Opponents | Score |
|---|---|---|---|---|---|---|---|
| Winner | 1. | 8 July 1991 | Erlangen, Germany | Clay | (Soviet Union) Viktoria Milvidskaia | (Australia) Louise Stacey (Australia) Angie Woolcock | 6–4, 6–4 |
| Runner-up | 2. | 17 August 1992 | Spoleto, Italy | Clay | (Austria) Sandra Dopfer | (Italy) Flora Perfetti (Italy) Gloria Pizzichini | 6–1, 2–6, 1–6 |
| Runner-up | 3. | 3 July 1995 | Sezze, Italy | Clay | (Czech Republic) Lenka Němečková | (Italy) Laura Garrone (Italy) Gloria Pizzichini | 6–7, 2–6 |
| Winner | 4. | 1 October 1995 | Bucharest, Romania | Clay | (Germany) Angela Kerek | (Bulgaria) Dora Djilianova (Bulgaria) Pavlina Nola | 6–2, 6–7^{(5–7)}, 6–3 |
| Runner-up | 5. | 20 October 1996 | Samara, Russia | Carpet (i) | (Netherlands) Anique Snijders | (Russia) Natalia Egorova (Russia) Olga Ivanova | 6–4, 2–6, 3–6 |
