= Emanuela Brusati =

Italian tennis player

- Country (sports): Italy
- Born: 19 April 1973 (age 51)
- Prize money: $42,886

Singles
- Career record: 85–93
- Career titles: 2 ITF
- Highest ranking: No. 274 (9 May 1994)

Grand Slam singles results
- Wimbledon: Q1 (1994)

Doubles
- Career record: 66–56
- Career titles: 6 ITF
- Highest ranking: No. 211 (17 June 1996)

Emanuela Brusati (born 19 April 1973) is an Italian former professional tennis player.

Brusati competed on the professional tour in the 1990s, reaching a top singles ranking of 274 in the world. She made the second round at a WTA Tour tournament in Hong Kong in 1993 and featured in the qualifying draw for the 1994 Wimbledon Championships.

== ITF Circuit finals ==
$25,000 tournaments
$10,000 tournaments

=== Singles: 4 (2–2) ===
Result	No.	Date	Tournament	Surface	Opponent	Score
Win	1.	31 May 1993	ITF Braga, Portugal	Hard	(Italy) Eleonora Agnolozzi	6–3, 6–0
Loss	1.	7 June 1993	ITF Oliveira de Azeméis, Portugal	Hard	(France) Olivia De Camaret	3–6, 2–6
Loss	2.	11 February 1996	ITF Carvoeiro, Portugal	Hard	(Spain) Alicia Ortuño	4–6, 3–6
Win	2.	24 August 1997	ITF Catania, Italy	Clay	(Italy) Alessia Risuleo	6–3, 6–2

=== Doubles: 12 (6–6) ===
Result	No.	Date	Tournament	Surface	Partner	Opponents	Score
Loss	1.	3 August 1992	ITF Nicolosi, Italy	Clay	(Italy) Germana Di Natale	(Italy) Rita Grande (Italy) Laura Lapi	4–6, 2–6
Win	1.	31 May 1993	ITF Braga, Portugal	Hard	(Brazil) Sabrina Giusto	(Japan) Miyako Ataka (Japan) Emiko Takahashi	6–2, 3–6, 6–2
Win	2.	23 August 1993	ITF La Spezia, Italy	Clay	(Italy) Cristina Salvi	(Czech Republic) Klára Bláhová (Italy) Gabriella Boschiero	7–6, 7–5
Win	3.	29 August 1994	ITF Massa, Italy	Clay	(Italy) Cristina Salvi	(Argentina) Veronica Stele (Argentina) Cintia Tortorella	7–5, 6–3
Loss	2.	11 September 1994	ITF Spoleto, Italy	Clay	(Italy) Cristina Salvi	(Italy) Flora Perfetti (Italy) Gabriella Boschiero	3–6, 4–6
Win	4.	30 July 1995	ITF Istanbul, Turkey	Hard	(Italy) Maria Paola Zavagli	(Japan) Yoriko Yamagishi (Czech Republic) Ludmila Varmužová	7–6^{(5)}, 6–3
Loss	3.	20 August 1995	ITF Nicolosi, Italy	Hard	(Italy) Cristina Salvi	(Australia) Natalie Frawley (Australia) Jenny Anne Fetch	4–6, 3–6
Loss	4.	21 January 1996	ITF Pontevedra, Spain	Hard	(France) Laurence Bois	(Netherlands) Annemarie Mikkers (Netherlands) Henriëtte van Aalderen	2–6, 2–6
Win	5.	11 February 1996	ITF Carvoeiro, Portugal	Hard	(Italy) Monica Scartoni	(Netherlands) Aafje Evers (Netherlands) Floor Vioen	6–4, 3–6, 7–5
Loss	5.	7 April 1996	ITF Moulins, France	Hard	(France) Laurence Bois	(United States) Jackie Moe (United States) Keirsten Alley	2–6, 5–7
Win	6.	2 June 1996	ITF Istanbul, Turkey	Hard	(United Kingdom) Emily Bond	(United Kingdom) Victoria Davies (United Kingdom) Helen Crook	7–6^{(4)}, 6–4
Loss	6.	17 August 1997	ITF Catania, Italy	Hard	(Italy) Sara Ventura	(Israel) Nataly Cahana (Netherlands) Martine Vosseberg	5–7, 6–4, 4–6
