= Marzia Grossi =

Italian tennis player (born 1970)

- Country (sports): Italy
- Born: 2 September 1970 (age 55)
- Prize money: $145,460

Singles
- Career record: 128–108
- Career titles: 1 WTA, 2 ITF
- Highest ranking: No. 79 (13 September 1993)

Grand Slam singles results
- Australian Open: 1R (1994)
- French Open: 3R (1994)
- Wimbledon: 1R (1994)
- US Open: 1R (1994)

Doubles
- Career record: 53–49
- Career titles: 7 ITF
- Highest ranking: No. 102 (9 October 1989)

Grand Slam doubles results
- Wimbledon: 1R (1989)

Marzia Grossi (born 2 September 1970) is a former professional tennis player from Italy.

== Biography ==
Grossi, who comes from Florence, began playing tennis at the age of eight.

She debuted on the professional circuit in 1989 and was more successful in doubles that year with a semifinal appearance at Athens the highlight.

From 1990 to 1992, she didn't feature in any WTA Tour events.

She won a WTA tournament title at San Marino in 1993, with a win over top seed Barbara Rittner in the final. The title in San Marino took her ranking into the top 100 and in September she reached a career best 79 in the world.

At the 1993 French Open, she qualified for the main draw of a Grand Slam singles match for the first time and took 13th seed Nathalie Tauziat to three sets in an opening-round loss. Her best French Open performance was a third-round appearance in 1994, and she also appeared in the singles main draws at the three other Grand Slam tournaments that year.

She appeared in two Fed Cup ties for Italy in 1994, partnering Rita Grande in the doubles, against Denmark and France.

== WTA career finals ==
=== Singles: 1 (1 title) ===
Result	Date	Tournament	Tier	Surface	Opponent	Score
Win	Jul 1993	San Marino	Tier IV	Clay	(Germany) Barbara Rittner	3–6, 7–5, 6–1

== ITF finals ==
$25,000 tournaments
$10,000 tournaments

=== Singles: 6 (2–4) ===
Result	No.	Date	Tournament	Surface	Opponent	Score
Win	1.	26 June 1988	ITF Arezzo, Italy	Clay	(Czechoslovakia) Eva Švíglerová	7–6, 6–1
Loss	1.	8 August 1988	ITF Palermo, Italy	Clay	(Austria) Karin Kschwendt	6–4, 0–6, 1–6
Loss	2.	13 July 1992	ITF Sezze, Italy	Clay	(Italy) Katia Piccolini	3–6, 6–3, 2–6
Loss	3.	28 September 1992	ITF Santa Maria, Italy	Clay	(Paraguay) Rossana de los Ríos	4–6, 0–6
Loss	4.	15 March 1993	ITF Reims, France	Clay	(France) Laurence Andretto	1–6, 2–6
Win	2.	9 July 1995	ITF Sezze, Italy	Clay	(Portugal) Sofia Prazeres	6–3, 6–2

=== Doubles: 8 (7–1) ===
Result	No.	Date	Tournament	Surface	Partner	Opponents	Score
Win	1.	3 April 1988	ITF Rome, Italy	Clay	(Italy) Francesca Romano	(Argentina) Fernanda González (Argentina) Mariana Pérez Roldán	7–5, 6–3
Win	2.	5 September 1988	ITF Agliana, Italy	Clay	(Italy) Barbara Romanò	(Finland) Anne Aallonen (Finland) Nanne Dahlman	4–6, 7–6, 6–4
Win	3.	10 April 1989	ITF Palermo, Italy	Clay	(Italy) Barbara Romanò	(Australia) Rachel McQuillan (Australia) Kristine Kunce	6–3, 6–2
Win	4.	13 May 1991	ITF Francavilla, Italy	Clay	(Italy) Caterina Nozzoli	(Paraguay) Viviana Valdovinos (United States) Jolene Watanabe-Giltz	6–1, 6–3
Win	5.	26 August 1991	ITF Ronchis, Italy	Clay	(Italy) Barbara Romanò	(Croatia) Maja Palaveršić (Czechoslovakia) Monika Kratochvílová	6–4, 7–5
Loss	1.	24 August 1992	ITF La Spezia, Italy	Clay	(Italy) Laura Lapi	(Czechoslovakia) Květa Peschke (Slovenia) Tina Vukasovič	5–7, 6–2, 2–6
Win	6.	24 March 1993	ITF Reims, France	Clay	(Italy) Rita Grande	(Moldova) Svetlana Komleva (Ukraine) Olga Lugina	6–4, 6–4
Win	7.	12 June 1995	ITF Massa, Italy	Clay	(Switzerland) Emmanuelle Gagliardi	(Italy) Alice Canepa (Italy) Giulia Casoni	3–6, 6–4, 7–5
