= Federica Bonsignori =

Italian tennis player

- Full name: Federica Bonsignori
- Country (sports): Italy
- Born: 20 November 1967 (age 57)
- Prize money: $329,849

Singles
- Career record: 225–206
- Career titles: 1 WTA, 4 ITF
- Highest ranking: No. 28 (13 May 1991)

Grand Slam singles results
- Australian Open: 2R (1989)
- French Open: 2R (1986, 1988, 1991, 1992)
- Wimbledon: 1R (1988, 1991, 1992)
- US Open: 2R (1987)

Doubles
- Career record: 31–66
- Career titles: 0
- Highest ranking: No. 154 (20 July 1987)

Grand Slam doubles results
- French Open: 1R (1987)

Federica Bonsignori (born 20 November 1967) is a former professional tennis player from Italy.

== Biography ==
Bonsignori started competing professionally in 1984.

She won her first Grand Slam match at the 1986 French Open when she had a double bagel win over Amanda Tobin. This was one of four occasions in her career that she reached the second round at Roland Garros, which was her best Grand Slam event.

In 1987, she upset top seed Manuela Maleeva en route to the quarter-finals of the Belgian Open and reached the semi-finals of the Clarins Open in Paris.

Across 1988 and 1989, she had a minimal impact on tour, unable to progress past the second round in any WTA Tour tournament.

Bonsignori won her only WTA tournament title at the 1990 Estoril Open. An unseeded player, she managed wins over three seeds, Angeliki Kanellopoulou, Isabel Cueto and Sabine Hack, before accounting for Laura Garrone in an all-Italian final.

She started 1991 by making the quarterfinals at Hilton Head, a run which included a win over top-10 player Katerina Maleeva. Following two more quarterfinal performances, in back to back WTA tournaments at Houston and Taranto, Bonsignori attained her highest ranking of 28 on 13 May 1991.

A member of the Italy Federation Cup team in 1991, Bonsignori made a brief appearance in the World Group quarterfinal tie against Germany in Nottingham. With the Germans having secured the tie, Bonsignori made her tournament debut by partnering Linda Ferrando in a dead rubber. Their opponents, Anke Huber and Barbara Rittner retired from the match after only one game.

She was runner-up to Magdalena Maleeva at the 1992 San Marino Open and continued playing on tour until 1995.

== WTA Tour finals ==
=== Singles (1 title, 1 runner-up) ===
Result	Date	Tournament	Tier	Surface	Opponent	Score
Win	Jul 1990	Portugal Open	Tier V	Clay	(Italy) Laura Garrone	2–6, 6–3, 6–3
Loss	Jul 1992	Internazionali di San Marino	Tier V	Clay	(Bulgaria) Magdalena Maleeva	6–7^{(3–7)}, 4–6

== ITF Circuit finals ==
=== Singles: 13 (4–9) ===
$50,000 tournaments
$25,000 tournaments
$10,000 tournaments

Result	No.	Date	Tournament	Surface	Opponent	Score
Loss	1.	1 August 1983	ITF Cava de' Tirreni, Italy	Clay	(Greece) Angeliki Kanellopoulou	1–6, 6–7
Win	2.	8 August 1983	ITF Sezze, Italy	Clay	(Spain) Ana Almansa	6–1, 6–3
Loss	3.	10 June 1985	ITF Lyon, France	Clay	(France) Cecille Calmette	7–6, 4–6, 4–6
Loss	4.	14 April 1986	ITF Monviso, Italy	Clay	(Czechoslovakia) Jana Novotná	6–7, 2–6
Win	5.	22 June 1987	ITF Francaville, Italy	Clay	(Italy) Barbara Romanò	1–6, 7–6, 6–4
Loss	6.	26 June 1989	ITF Arezzo, Italy	Clay	(Argentina) Florencia Labat	4–6, 4–6
Win	7.	24 July 1989	ITF Kitzbühel, Austria	Clay	(Belgium) Sabine Appelmans	6–3, 4–6, 7–6^{(2)}
Loss	8.	4 June 1990	ITF Mantua, Italy	Hard	(South Africa) Mariaan de Swardt	3–6, 7–6, 3–6
Win	9.	19 August 1991	ITF Spoleto, Italy	Clay	(Italy) Cristina Salvi	6–4, 6–3
Loss	10.	22 February 1993	ITF Valencia, Spain	Hard	(Italy) Elena Savoldi	4–6, 1–6
Loss	11.	28 June 1993	ITF Stuttgart, Germany	Clay	(Austria) Sandra Dopfer	1–6, 0–6
Loss	12.	4 July 1994	ITF Erlangen, Germany	Clay	(Slovakia) Radka Zrubáková	2–6, 1–6
Loss	13.	20 February 1995	ITF Valencia, Spain	Clay	(Spain) Neus Ávila	3–6, 2–6

=== Doubles: 2 (0–2) ===
Result	No.	Date	Tournament	Surface	Partner	Opponents	Score
Loss	1.	22 April 1990	ITF Turin, Italy	Clay	(Hungary) Andrea Noszály	(Japan) Ei Iida (Indonesia) Suzanna Wibowo	5–7, 6–3, 4–6
Loss	2.	17 April 1995	ITF Murcia, Spain	Clay	(Italy) Gloria Pizzichini	(Argentina) Mariana Eberle (Argentina) Veronica Stele	5–7, 2–6
