= Nicolosi =

Nicolosi Niculusi (Sicilian)
- Comune
- Comune di Nicolosi
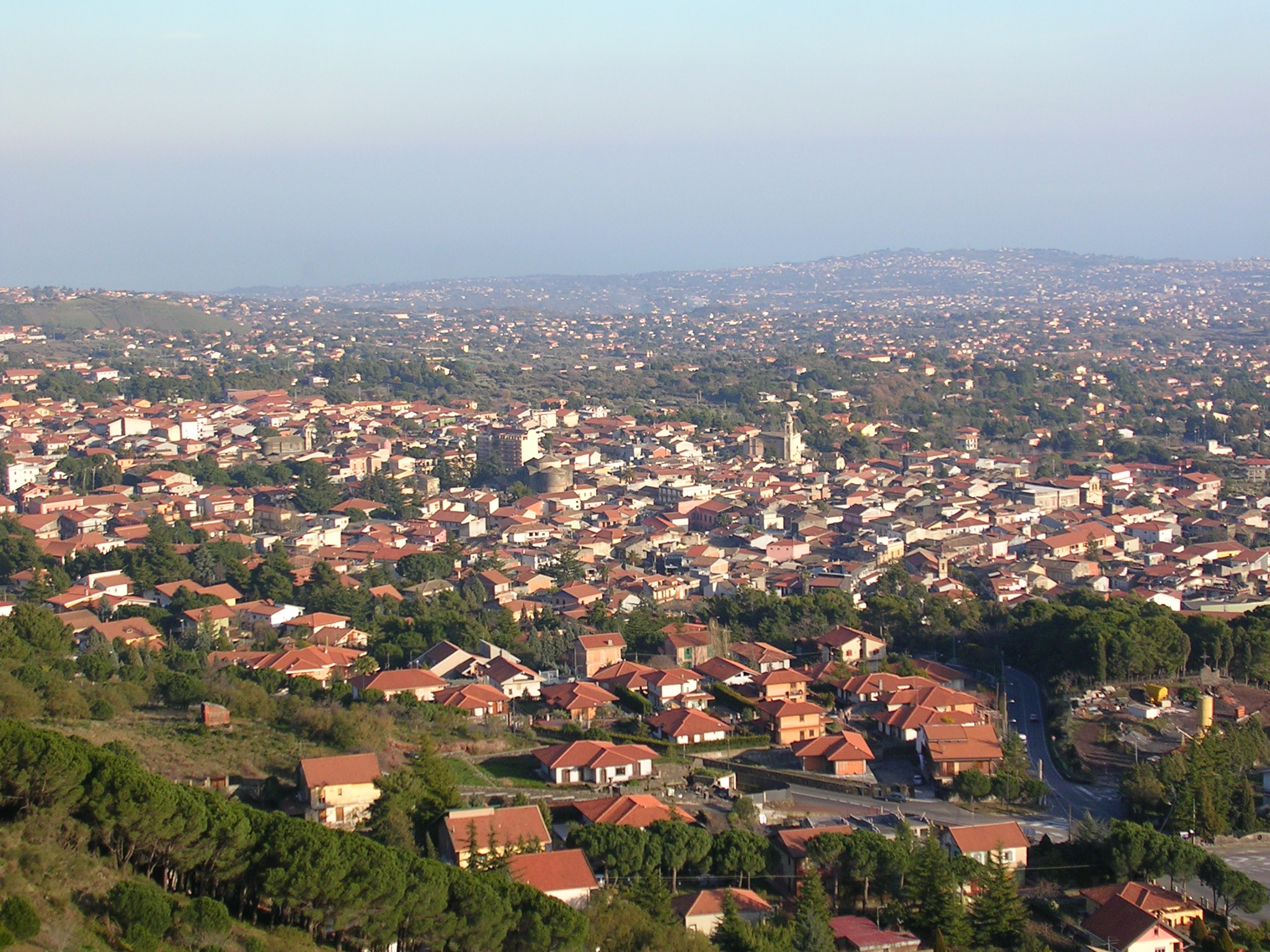

- Coat of arms

- Location within Italy Location within Sicily
- Coordinates: 37°37′N 15°1′E
- Country: Italy
- Region: Sicily
- Metropolitan city: Catania (CT)

Government
  - Mayor: Angelo Pulvirenti

Area
  - Total: 42.65 km^{2} (16.47 sq mi)
- Elevation: 700 m (2,300 ft)

Population (30 June 2022)
  - Total: 7,599
  - Density: 178.2/km^{2} (461.5/sq mi)
- Demonym: Nicolositi o Niculusoti (Sicilian)
- Time zone: UTC+1 (CET)
  - Summer (DST): UTC+2 (CEST)
- Postal code: 95030
- Dialing code: 095
- Patron saint: St. Anthony of Padua
- Saint day: Second Sunday in August
- Website: www.comune.nicolosi.ct.it

Nicolosi (Sicilian: Niculusi) is a comune (municipality) in the Metropolitan City of Catania in the Italian region Sicily, located about 160 kilometres (99 mi) southeast of Palermo and about 12 kilometres (7 mi) northwest of Catania.

Nicolosi borders the following municipalities: Adrano, Belpasso, Biancavilla, Bronte, Castiglione di Sicilia, Maletto, Mascalucia, Pedara, Randazzo, Sant'Alfio, Zafferana Etnea.

== Twin towns — sister cities ==
Nicolosi is twinned with:

- Edremit, Turkey since 2010
