= Flora Perfetti =

Italian tennis player

- Country (sports): Italy
- Born: January 29, 1969 (age 57)
- Plays: Right-handed
- Prize money: US$ 425,684

Singles
- Career record: 193–160
- Career titles: 0 WTA, 0 ITF
- Highest ranking: No. 54 (April 21, 1997)

Grand Slam singles results
- Australian Open: 3R (1998)
- French Open: 3R (1997)
- Wimbledon: 2R (1996, 1998)
- US Open: 3R (1997)

Doubles
- Career record: 73–81
- Career titles: 0 WTA, 0 ITF
- Highest ranking: No. 71 (March 17, 1997)

Grand Slam doubles results
- Australian Open: 3R (1997)
- French Open: 1R (1995, 1997, 1998)
- Wimbledon: 1R (1997)
- US Open: 1R (1995)

Mixed doubles
- Career record: 1–1
- Career titles: 0

Grand Slam mixed doubles results
- Wimbledon: 2R (1997)
- Last updated on: April 22, 2013.

Flora Perfetti (born 29 January 1969) is an Italian tennis player. On 21 April 1997 she reached her highest WTA singles ranking at No. 54 and 17 March of the same year reached her highest doubles ranking at No. 71.

== Biography ==
Flora started playing tennis when she was 6 and by the age of 9 her father had signed her up for tennis classes. At the age of 16 she won her first Italian team title at C.A. Faenza. At the age of 21 she won her first title at a $10,000 tournament at Riccione, winning the final against Ginevra Mugnaini. In 1997 she played the Fed Cup with Silvia Farina Elia, Gloria Pizzichini, and Francesca Lubiani with a 'big finish'. Throughout her career she has won 193 singles matches, 73 doubles matches and accumulated $425,684 in prize money to date. She now teaches at C.A. Faenza.

== ITF finals ==
=== Singles (5–7) ===
Legend
$100,000 tournaments
$75,000 tournaments
$50,000 tournaments
$25,000 tournaments
$10,000 tournaments

Result	No.	Date	Tournament	Surface	Opponent	Score
Loss	1.	5 March 1990	Valencia, Spain	Clay	(China) Tang Min	2–6, 6–0, 4–6
Win	2.	22 April 1991	Riccione, Italy	Clay	(Italy) Ginevra Mugnaini	6–1, 6–4
Loss	3.	27 May 1991	Brindisi, Italy	Clay	(Argentina) Inés Gorrochategui	5–7, 3–6
Win	4.	1 June 1992	Brindisi, Italy	Clay	(Brazil) Luciana Tella	7–5, 6–3
Loss	5.	15 June 1992	Milan, Italy	Clay	(Switzerland) Emanuela Zardo	4–6, 4–6
Loss	6.	19 June 1994	Sezze, Italy	Clay	(Paraguay) Larissa Schaerer	2–6, 3–6
Win	7.	5 September 1994	Spoleto, Italy	Clay	(Italy) Stefania Pifferi	3–6, 6–3, 6–1
Win	8.	27 March 1995	Reims, France	Clay	(Austria) Marion Maruska	6–4, 2–6, 7–5
Loss	9.	2 December 1996	Cergy-Pontoise, France	Hard	(France) Anne-Gaëlle Sidot	2–6, 7–6^{(7–5)}, 1–6
Loss	10.	30 August 1999	Fano, Italy	Clay	(Slovakia) Daniela Hantuchová	4–6, 7–6, 2–6
Loss	11.	12 June 2000	Grado, Italy	Clay	(Spain) Gisela Riera	2–6, 4–6
Win	12.	10 September 2000	Fano, Italy	Clay	(Slovenia) Maja Matevžič	6–3, 6–4

=== Doubles (5–3) ===
Result	No.	Date	Tournament	Surface	Partner	Opponents	Score
Win	1.	6 November 1989	Fez, Morocco	Clay	(Czechoslovakia) Lucie Kořínková	(West Germany) Petra Kemper (West Germany) Barbara Rittner	6–1, 6–2
Loss	2.	1 April 1991	Bari, Italy	Clay	(United States) Jennifer Fuchs	(Czechoslovakia) Monika Kratochvílová (Bulgaria) Svetlana Krivencheva	7–5, 2–6, 5–7
Win	3.	17 August 1992	Spoleto, Italy	Clay	(Italy) Gloria Pizzichini	(Austria) Sandra Dopfer (Germany) Maja Živec-Škulj	1–6, 6–2, 6–1
Loss	4.	20 September 1993	Capua, Italy	Clay	(Italy) Francesca Romano	(Czech Republic) Ivana Jankovská (Czech Republic) Eva Melicharová	3–6, 6–3, 6–7
Win	5.	12 June 1994	Caserta, Italy	Clay	(Hungary) Virág Csurgó	(Japan) Mami Donoshiro (Japan) Kyōko Nagatsuka	6–1, 7–5
Win	6.	5 September 1994	Spoleto, Italy	Clay	(Italy) Gabriella Boschiero	(Italy) Emanuela Brusati (Italy) Cristina Salvi	6–3, 6–4
Win	7.	18 March 1996	Reims, France	Clay	(Italy) Giulia Casoni	(Australia) Siobhan Drake-Brockman (France) Catherine Tanvier	6–3, 4–6, 6–0
Loss	8.	14 July 1996	İstanbul, Turkey	Hard	(Italy) Laura Garrone	(Slovenia) Tina Križan (Ukraine) Olga Lugina	4–6, 2–6
