= Katia Piccolini =

Italian tennis player

- Country (sports): Italy
- Born: 15 January 1973 (age 53) L'Aquila, Italy
- Height: 1.68 m (5 ft 6 in)
- Plays: Right-handed
- Prize money: $185,854

Singles
- Career record: 171–110
- Career titles: 1 WTA, 7 ITF
- Highest ranking: No. 37 (22 July 1991)

Grand Slam singles results
- French Open: 2R (1992)
- Wimbledon: 1R (1990)
- US Open: 3R (1990)

Doubles
- Career record: 17–35
- Career titles: 0
- Highest ranking: No. 160 (20 April 1992)
Medal record
Mediterranean Games
Gold medal – first place	1991 Athens	Women's Singles
Gold medal – first place	1991 Athens	Women's Doubles

Katia Piccolini (born 15 January 1973) is a former tennis player from Italy who competed on the WTA Tour from 1988 to 1999. She reached a career-high ranking of No. 37 in July 1991 and competed in the 1992 Summer Olympics. Other career highlights include reaching the third round of the 1990 US Open and winning the singles title at the San Marino Open in 1991.

== WTA career finals ==
=== Singles: 2 (1 title, 1 runner-up) ===
Legend
Grand Slam (0)
Tier I (0)
Tier II (0)
Tier III (3)
Tier IV-V (0)

Result	W-L	Date	Tournament	Date	Opponent	Score
Loss	0–1	Sep 1990	Athens Trophy, Greece	Clay	(Sweden) Cecilia Dahlman	5–7, 5–7
Win	1–1	Jul 1991	San Marino Open, San Marino	Clay	(Italy) Silvia Farina	6–2, 6–3

== ITF Circuit finals ==
=== Singles: 12 (7–5) ===
$50,000 tournaments
$25,000 tournaments
$10,000 tournaments

Result	No.	Date	Location	Surface	Opponent	Score
Loss	1.	4 July 1988	Cava de' Tirreni, Italy	Clay	(West Germany) Christiane Hofmann	1–6, 6–7
Loss	2.	11 July 1988	Sezze, Italy	Clay	(Poland) Katarzyna Nowak	4–6, 6–2, 4–6
Win	3.	18 July 1988	Subiaco, Italy	Clay	(Italy) Francesca Romano	7–5, 6–3
Win	4.	16 April 1990	Naples, Italy	Clay	(West Germany) Marketa Kochta	6–2, 6–4
Loss	5.	7 May 1990	Modena, Italy	Clay	(Switzerland) Emanuela Zardo	1–6, 6–4, 5–7
Win	6.	2 September 1991	Arzachena, Italy	Hard	(United Kingdom) Samantha Smith	6–2, 6–7, 6–4
Win	7.	13 July 1992	Sezze, Italy	Clay	(Italy) Marzia Grossi	6–3, 3–6, 6–2
Win	8.	21 September 1992	Acireale, Italy	Clay	(Italy) Laura Lapi	6–3, 6–2
Win	9.	19 July 1993	Sezze, Italy	Clay	(Italy) Laura Lapi	6–3, 6–2
Loss	10.	14 July 1997	Civitanova, Italy	Clay	(Croatia) Marijana Kovačević	0–6, 0–6
Loss	11.	27 April 1998	San Severo, Italy	Clay	(Argentina) Veronica Stele	4–6, 3–6
Win	12.	6 July 1998	Fiumicino, Italy	Clay	(Italy) Alessia Lombardi	6–2, 1–6, 6–2
