= Gabriella Boschiero =

Italian tennis player

- Country (sports): Italy
- Born: 13 January 1972 (age 53); Bologna, Italy
- Height: 160 cm (5 ft 3 in)
- Prize money: $61,352

Singles
- Career record: 117–98
- Career titles: 5 ITF
- Highest ranking: No. 174 (11 September 1995)

Doubles
- Career record: 50–56
- Career titles: 4 ITF
- Highest ranking: No. 247 (6 July 1992)

Gabriella Boschiero (born 13 January 1972) is an Italian former professional tennis player.

Born in Bologna, Boschiero reaching a best ranking of 174 on the professional circuit, winning five ITF singles titles. Her best performances on the WTA Tour were second-round appearances at the 1988 Taranto Open and 1995 Italian Open.

== ITF Circuit finals ==
$25,000 tournaments
$10,000 tournaments

=== Singles: 6 (5–1) ===
Result	No.	Date	Tournament	Surface	Opponent	Score
Win	1.	1 July 1991	ITF Palermo, Italy	Clay	(Sri Lanka) Lihini Weerasuriya	5–7, 6–4, ret.
Win	2.	23 August 1993	ITF La Spezia, Italy	Clay	(Italy) Paola Tampieri	6–3, 6–4
Win	3.	25 July 1994	ITF Subiaco, Italy	Clay	(Italy) Emanuela Sangiorgi	6–0, 6–0
Win	4.	29 August 1994	ITF Marina di Massa, Italy	Clay	(Italy) Stefania Pifferi	6–4, 6–4
Win	5.	1 July 1996	ITF Sezze, Italy	Clay	(Slovenia) Katja Kovač	6–0, 6–1
Loss	1.	15 July 1996	ITF Fiumicino, Italy	Clay	(Italy) Emanuela Sangiorgi	2–6, 6–3, 2–6

=== Doubles: 10 (4–6) ===
Result	No.	Date	Tournament	Surface	Partner	Opponents	Score
Loss	1.	10 June 1991	ITF Rome, Italy	Clay	(Italy) Federica Ricadonna	(Czechoslovakia) Monika Kratochvílová (Czechoslovakia) Janette Husárová	4–6, 2–6
Loss	2.	29 July 1991	ITF Acireale, Italy	Clay	(United States) Kylie Johnson	(Australia) Justine Hodder (Australia) Danielle Jones	4–6, 4–6
Loss	3.	5 August 1991	ITF Nicolosi, Italy	Hard	(United States) Kylie Johnson	(China) Tang Min (China) Li Fang	0–6, 6–7^{(3)}
Win	1.	21 October 1991	ITF Lyss, Switzerland	Hard (i)	(Croatia) Maja Palaveršić	(Croatia) Maja Murić (Croatia) Petra Rihtarić	3–6, 6–1, 7–5
Win	2.	27 April 1992	ITF Riccione, Italy	Clay	(Czechoslovakia) Petra Raclavská	(Czechoslovakia) Monika Kratochvílová (Croatia) Maja Palaveršić	3–6, 6–3, 6–1
Loss	4.	23 August 1993	ITF La Spezia, Italy	Clay	(Czech Republic) Klára Bláhová	(Italy) Emanuela Brusati (Italy) Cristina Salvi	6–7, 5–7
Win	3.	25 July 1994	ITF Subiaco, Italy	Clay	(Italy) Sara Ventura	(Italy) Federica Maldini (Italy) Monica Scartoni	6–2, 6–0
Win	4.	5 September 1994	ITF Spoleto, Italy	Clay	(Italy) Flora Perfetti	(Italy) Emanuela Brusati (Italy) Cristina Salvi	6–3, 6–4
Loss	5.	7 July 1996	ITF Sezze, Italy	Clay	(Argentina) Veronica Stele	(San Marino) Francesca Guardigli (Romania) Andreea Vanc	6–0, 2–6, 3–6
Loss	6.	21 July 1996	ITF Fiumicino, Italy	Clay	(Italy) Sara Ventura	(Romania) Andreea Ehritt-Vanc (Bulgaria) Teodora Nedeva	0–6, 3–6
