= WTA San Marino =

Defunct tennis tournament
- Tour: WTA Tour
- Founded: 1991
- Abolished: 1993
- Editions: 3
- Location: City of San Marino, San Marino
- Venue: Centro Sportivo Tennis (1991–92); Risparmio Tennis Club (1993)
- Category: Tier V (1991–92); Tier IV (1993)
- Surface: Clay / outdoor

The WTA San Marino was a women's tennis tournament held in the City of San Marino, San Marino, from 1991 until 1993. The tournament was part of the WTA Tour and categorized as Tier V in 1991 and 1992 and Tier IV in 1993. The event was held in July and played on outdoor clay courts at the Centro Sportivo Tennis in 1991 and 1992 and at the Risparmio Tennis Club in 1993.

== Past finals ==
=== Singles ===
Year	Champions	Runners-up	Score
1991	(Italy) Katia Piccolini	(Italy) Silvia Farina	6–2, 6–3
1992	(Bulgaria) Magdalena Maleeva	(Italy) Federica Bonsignori	7–6, 6–4
1993	(Italy) Marzia Grossi	(Germany) Barbara Rittner	3–6, 7–5, 6–1

=== Doubles ===
Year	Champions	Runners-up	Score
1991	(Australia) Kerry-Anne Guse (Japan) Akemi Nishiya	(Italy) Laura Garrone (Argentina) Mercedes Paz	6–0, 6–3
1992	(France) Alexia Dechaume (Argentina) Florencia Labat	(Italy) Sandra Cecchini (Italy) Laura Garrone	7–6^{(8–6)}, 7–5
1993	(Italy) Anna-Maria Cecchini (Argentina) Patricia Tarabini	(Argentina) Florencia Labat (Germany) Barbara Rittner	6–3, 6–2

== See also ==
- San Marino Open – men's tournament
