= Sandra Cecchini =

Italian tennis player

- Country (sports): Italy
- Residence: Cervia, Italy; Monte Carlo, Monaco
- Born: 27 February 1965 (age 61) Bologna, Emilia-Romagna
- Height: 1.69 m (5 ft 6 1/2 in)
- Turned pro: 1984
- Retired: 1999
- Plays: Right-handed (one handed-backhand)
- Prize money: $1,314,473

Singles
- Career record: 340–235
- Career titles: 12
- Highest ranking: No. 15 (14 March 1988)

Grand Slam singles results
- Australian Open: 1R (1996)
- French Open: QF (1985)
- Wimbledon: 2R (1984, 1985, 1994)
- US Open: 3R (1985, 1987, 1994)

Doubles
- Career record: 211–182
- Career titles: 11
- Highest ranking: No. 22 (13 September 1993)

Grand Slam doubles results
- Australian Open: 1R (1996)
- French Open: SF (1993)
- Wimbledon: 3R (1995)
- US Open: QF (1993)

Team competitions
- Fed Cup: 16–17

Anna-Maria "Sandra" Cecchini (Italian pronunciation: [ˈsandra tʃekˈkiːni]; born 27 February 1965) is a retired tennis player from Italy.

== Career ==
Cecchini turned professional in 1984. She won 12 singles and 11 doubles titles on the WTA Tour. She had career wins over Chris Evert, Arantxa Sánchez Vicario, Gabriela Sabatini, Nathalie Tauziat, Natasha Zvereva, and Anke Huber. Her most notable Grand Slam performance came at the French Open in 1985, when she reached the quarterfinals. In March 1988, she achieved her highest singles ranking of world No. 15.

== WTA career finals ==
=== Singles: 18 (12–6) ===
| Winner – Legend Tier I (0–0) Tier II (0–0) Tier III (0–1) Tier IV (1–1) Tier V (5–3) Virginia Slims (6–1) | Finals by surface Hard (2–0) Grass (0–0) Clay (10–5) Carpet (0–1) |

| Result | W/L | Date | Tournament | Surface | Opponent | Score |
|---|---|---|---|---|---|---|
| Win | 1–0 | Apr 1984 | Taranto, Italy | Clay | (Socialist Federal Republic of Yugoslavia) Sabrina Goleš | 6–2, 7–5 |
| Win | 2–0 | Jul 1984 | Rio de Janeiro, Brazil | Hard | (Argentina) Adriana Villagrán | 6–3, 6–3 |
| Win | 3–0 | May 1985 | Barcelona, Spain | Clay | (Italy) Raffaella Reggi | 6–3, 6–4 |
| Win | 4–0 | Jul 1986 | Bregenz, Austria | Clay | (Argentina) Mariana Pérez Roldán | 6–4, 6–0 |
| Loss | 4–1 | May 1987 | Strasbourg, France | Clay | (Canada) Carling Bassett | 3–6, 4–6 |
| Win | 5–1 | Jul 1987 | Båstad, Sweden | Clay | (Sweden) Catarina Lindqvist | 6–4, 6–4 |
| Win | 6–1 | Nov 1987 | Little Rock, U.S. | Hard (i) | (Soviet Union) Natalia Zvereva | 0–6, 6–1, 6–3 |
| Win | 7–1 | May 1988 | Strasbourg, France | Clay | (Austria) Judith Wiesner | 6–3, 6–0 |
| Loss | 7–2 | Jul 1988 | Båstad, Sweden | Clay | (West Germany) Isabel Cueto | 5–7, 1–6 |
| Win | 8–2 | Jul 1988 | Nice, France | Clay | (France) Nathalie Tauziat | 7–5, 6–4 |
| Loss | 8–3 | Jul 1989 | Estoril, Portugal | Clay | (West Germany) Isabel Cueto | 6–7^{(3–7)}, 2–6 |
| Win | 9–3 | Sep 1989 | Paris, France | Clay | (Czechoslovakia) Regina Rajchrtová | 6–4, 6–7^{(5–7)}, 6–1 |
| Win | 10–3 | Jul 1990 | Båstad, Sweden | Clay | (Switzerland) Csilla Bartos | 6–1, 6–2 |
| Win | 11–3 | Apr 1991 | Bol, Croatia | Clay | (Bulgaria) Magdalena Maleeva | 6–4, 3–6, 7–5 |
| Loss | 11–4 | Jul 1991 | Palermo, Italy | Clay | (France) Mary Pierce | 0–6, 3–6 |
| Win | 12–4 | Sep 1992 | Paris, France | Clay | (Switzerland) Emanuela Zardo | 6–2, 6–1 |
| Loss | 12–5 | Sep 1994 | Moscow, Russia | Carpet (i) | (Bulgaria) Magdalena Maleeva | 5–7, 1–6 |
| Loss | 12–6 | Aug 1996 | Maria Lankowitz, Austria | Clay | (Austria) Barbara Paulus | 15–40 ret. |

=== Doubles: 22 (11–11) ===
| Winner – Legend Tier I (0–0) Tier II (0–0) Tier III (1–2) Tier IV (3–3) Tier V (5–3) Virginia Slims (2–3) | Finals by surface Hard (0–0) Grass (0–0) Clay (11–9) Carpet (0–2) |

| Result | W/L | Date | Tournament | Surface | Partner | Opponents | Score |
|---|---|---|---|---|---|---|---|
| Win | 1. | Apr 1985 | Taranto, Italy | Clay | (Italy) Raffaella Reggi | (Italy) Patrizia Murgo (Italy) Barbara Romanò | 1–6, 6–4, 6–3 |
| Loss | 1. | Nov 1985 | Hilversum, Netherlands | Carpet (i) | (Socialist Federal Republic of Yugoslavia) Sabrina Goleš | (Netherlands) Marcella Mesker (France) Catherine Tanvier | 2–6, 2–6 |
| Win | 2. | Apr 1986 | Charleston, U.S. | Clay | (Socialist Federal Republic of Yugoslavia) Sabrina Goleš | (Peru) Laura Gildemeister (Czechoslovakia) Marcela Skuherská | 4–6, 6–0, 6–3 |
| Loss | 2. | Jul 1987 | Båstad, Sweden | Clay | (Argentina) Patricia Tarabini | (United States) Penny Barg (Denmark) Tine Scheuer-Larsen | 1–6, 2–6 |
| Loss | 3. | Sep 1987 | Paris, France | Clay | (Socialist Federal Republic of Yugoslavia) Sabrina Goleš | (France) Isabelle Demongeot (France) Nathalie Tauziat | 6–1, 3–6, 3–6 |
| Win | 3. | Jul 1988 | Båstad, Sweden | Clay | (Argentina) Mercedes Paz | (Italy) Linda Ferrando (Italy) Silvia La Fratta | 6–0, 6–2 |
| Loss | 4. | Jul 1988 | Aix-en-Provence, France | Clay | (Spain) Arantxa Sánchez | (France) Nathalie Herreman (France) Catherine Tanvier | 4–6, 5–7 |
| Win | 4. | Jul 1989 | Arcachon, France | Clay | (Argentina) Patricia Tarabini | (Argentina) Mercedes Paz (Netherlands) Brenda Schultz | 6–3, 7–6^{(7–5)} |
| Win | 5. | Sep 1989 | Athens, Greece | Clay | (Argentina) Patricia Tarabini | (West Germany) Silke Meier (Bulgaria) Elena Pampoulova | 4–6, 6–4, 6–2 |
| Win | 6. | Sep 1989 | Paris, France | Clay | (Argentina) Patricia Tarabini | (France) Nathalie Herreman (France) Catherine Suire | 6–1, 6–1 |
| Loss | 5. | Apr 1990 | Tampa, U.S. | Clay | (Peru) Laura Gildemeister | (Argentina) Mercedes Paz (Spain) Arantxa Sánchez Vicario | 2–6, 0–6 |
| Win | 7. | Jul 1990 | Estoril, Portugal | Clay | (Argentina) Patricia Tarabini | (Netherlands) Carin Bakkum (Netherlands) Nicole Jagerman | 1–6, 6–2, 6–3 |
| Loss | 6. | Sep 1990 | Kitzbühel, Austria | Clay | (Argentina) Patricia Tarabini | (Czechoslovakia) Petra Langrová (Czechoslovakia) Radomira Zrubáková | 0–6, 4–6 |
| Loss | 7. | Apr 1991 | Bol, Croatia | Clay | (Italy) Laura Garrone | (Italy) Laura Golarsa (Bulgaria) Magdalena Maleeva | w/o |
| Loss | 8. | Jul 1991 | Kitzbühel, Austria | Clay | (Argentina) Patricia Tarabini | (Argentina) Bettina Fulco (Netherlands) Nicole Jagerman | 5–7, 4–6 |
| Loss | 9. | Jul 1992 | San Marino, San Marino | Clay | (Italy) Laura Garrone | (France) Alexia Dechaume (Argentina) Florencia Labat | 6–7^{(6–8)}, 5–7 |
| Win | 8. | Sep 1992 | Paris, France | Clay | (Argentina) Patricia Tarabini | (Australia) Rachel McQuillan (France) Noëlle van Lottum | 7–5, 6–1 |
| Win | 9. | Jul 1993 | San Marino, San Marino | Clay | (Argentina) Patricia Tarabini | (Argentina) Florencia Labat (Germany) Barbara Rittner | 6–3, 6–2 |
| Loss | 10. | Oct 1993 | Budapest, Hungary | Carpet (i) | (Argentina) Patricia Tarabini | (Argentina) Inés Gorrochategui (Netherlands) Caroline Vis | 1–6, 3–6 |
| Loss | 11. | Apr 1994 | Taranto, Italy | Clay | (France) Isabelle Demongeot | (Romania) Irina Spîrlea (France) Noëlle van Lottum | 3–6, 6–2, 1–6 |
| Win | 10. | Jul 1994 | Maria Lankowitz, Austria | Clay | (Argentina) Patricia Tarabini | (France) Alexandra Fusai (Slovakia) Karina Habšudová | 7–5, 7–5 |
| Win | 11. | Sep 1995 | Warsaw, Poland | Clay | (Italy) Laura Garrone | (Slovakia) Henrieta Nagyová (Slovakia) Denisa Szabová | 5–7, 6–2, 6–3 |

== ITF Circuit finals ==
$25,000 tournaments
$10,000 tournaments

=== Singles (2–0) ===
| Result | No. | Date | Tournament | Surface | Opponent | Score |
|---|---|---|---|---|---|---|
| Win | 1. | 28 March 1983 | Taranto, Italy | Clay | (Socialist Federal Republic of Yugoslavia) Sabrina Goleš | 6–7, 7–6, 6–3 |
| Win | 2. | 4 April 1983 | Caserta, Italy | Clay | (Socialist Federal Republic of Yugoslavia) Sabrina Goleš | 2–6, 7–6, 6–2 |

== Grand Slam singles performance timeline ==
Key
| W | F | SF | QF | #R | RR | Q# | DNQ | A | NH |

(W) winner; (F) finalist; (SF) semifinalist; (QF) quarterfinalist; (#R) rounds 4, 3, 2, 1; (RR) round-robin stage; (Q#) qualification round; (DNQ) did not qualify; (A) absent; (NH) not held; (SR) strike rate (events won / competed); (W–L) win–loss record.

=== Singles ===
| Tournament | 1983 | 1984 | 1985 | 1986 | 1987 | 1988 | 1989 | 1990 | 1991 | 1992 | 1993 | 1994 | 1995 | 1996 | 1997 | 1998 | Career SR |
|---|---|---|---|---|---|---|---|---|---|---|---|---|---|---|---|---|---|
| Australian Open | A | A | A | NH | A | A | A | A | A | A | A | A | A | 1R | A | A | 0 / 1 |
| French Open | A | 1R | QF | 1R | 1R | 3R | 1R | 3R | 4R | 2R | 2R | 2R | 1R | 2R | 2R | 1R | 0 / 15 |
| Wimbledon | A | 2R | 2R | 1R | A | A | A | 1R | 1R | A | A | 2R | 1R | A | A | A | 0 / 7 |
| US Open | A | 1R | 3R | 1R | 3R | 1R | 1R | 2R | 2R | 1R | 2R | 3R | 1R | 1R | A | A | 0 / 13 |
| SR | 0 / 0 | 0 / 3 | 0 / 3 | 0 / 3 | 0 / 2 | 0 / 2 | 0 / 2 | 0 / 3 | 0 / 3 | 0 / 2 | 0 / 2 | 0 / 3 | 0 / 3 | 0 / 3 | 0 / 1 | 0 / 1 | 0 / 36 |
| Year-end ranking | 122 | 49 | 49 | 73 | 18 | 21 | 26 | 20 | 27 | 34 | 55 | 33 | 106 | 73 | 204 | 196 | |
