= Florencia Labat =

Argentine tennis player

- Country (sports): Argentina
- Residence: Buenos Aires, Argentina
- Born: 12 June 1971 (age 55) Buenos Aires, Argentina
- Height: 1.70 m (5 ft 7 in)
- Retired: 2000
- Plays: Left-handed
- Prize money: US$ 1,350,630

Singles
- Career record: 209–197
- Highest ranking: No. 26 in 1994

Doubles
- Career record: 169–179
- Career titles: 7
- Highest ranking: No. 27 (22 February 1999)

Grand Slam doubles results
- Australian Open: QF 1999
Medal record
Representing Argentina
Pan American Games
Gold medal – first place	1995 Mar del Plata	Singles

María Florencia Labat (born 12 June 1971) is an Argentine former professional female tennis player. She joined the WTA Tour in 1988 and retired in 2000. On 12 September 1994, Labat reached a career-high singles ranking of number 26 in the world.

== WTA Tour finals ==
=== Singles 4 (0–4) ===
Legend
Grand Slam	0
WTA Championships	0
Tier I	0
Tier II	0
Tier III	0
Tier IV & V	0

Result	W/L	Date	Tournament	Tier	Surface	Opponent	Score
Loss	0–1	Oct 1993	Curitiba, Brazil	Tier IV	Clay	(Germany) Sabine Hack	2–6, 0–6
Loss	0–2	Jan 1994	Brisbane, Australia	Tier III	Hard	(United States) Lindsay Davenport	1–6, 6–2, 3–6
Loss	0–3	Apr 1994	Singapore	Tier IV	Hard	(Japan) Naoko Sawamatsu	5–7, 5–7
Loss	0–4	May 1994	Jakarta, Indonesia	Tier IV	Hard	(Indonesia) Yayuk Basuki	4–6, 6–3, 6–7^{(1–7)}

=== Doubles 17 (7–10) ===
Legend
Grand Slam	0
WTA Championships	0
Tier I	0
Tier II	0
Tier III	2
Tier IV & V	4

Titles by surface
Hard	2
Clay	5
Grass	0
Carpet	0

Result	W/L	Date	Tournament	Tier	Surface	Partner	Opponents	Score
Loss	0–1	Jul 1990	Palermo, Italy	Tier V	Clay	(Italy) Barbara Romanò	(Italy) Laura Garrone (Austria) Karin Kschwendt	2–6, 4–6
Win	1–1.	May 1991	Taranto, Italy	Tier V	Clay	(France) Alexia Dechaume	(Italy) Laura Golarsa (United States) Ann Wunderlich	6–2, 7–5
Win	2–1	Oct 1991	San Juan, Puerto Rico	Tier IV	Hard	(Japan) Rika Hiraki	(Belgium) Sabine Appelmans (United States) Camille Benjamin	6–3, 6–3
Win	3–1	Jul 1992	Kitzbühel, Austria	Tier IV	Clay	(France) Alexia Dechaume	(South Africa) Amanda Coetzer (Germany) Wiltrud Probst	6–3, 6–3
Win	4–1	Jul 1992	San Marino	Tier V	Clay	(France) Alexia Dechaume	(Italy) Sandra Cecchini (Italy) Laura Garrone	7–6^{(8–6)}, 7–5
Win	5–1	Aug 1992	Schenectady, US	Tier V	Hard	(France) Alexia Dechaume	(United States) Ginger Helgeson (United States) Shannan McCarthy	6–3, 1–6, 6–2
Loss	5–2	Aug 1993	San Marino	Tier IV	Clay	(Germany) Barbara Rittner	(Italy) Sandra Cecchini (Argentina) Patricia Tarabini	3–6, 2–6
Loss	5–3	Aug 1993	Schenectady, US	Tier III	Hard	(Germany) Barbara Rittner	(Australia) Rachel McQuillan (Germany) Claudia Porwik	6–4, 4–6, 2–6
Loss	5–4	Jul 1996	Palermo, Italy	Tier IV	Clay	(Germany) Barbara Rittner	(Slovakia) Janette Husárová (Austria) Barbara Schett	1–6, 2–6
Loss	5–5	Jun 1997	Rosmalen, Netherlands	Tier III	Grass	(Slovakia) Karina Habšudová	(Czech Republic) Eva Melicharová (Czech Republic) Helena Vildová	3–6, 6–7^{(6–8)}
Loss	5–6	Jul 1997	Palermo, Italy	Tier IV	Clay	(Argentina) Mercedes Paz	(Italy) Silvia Farina (Austria) Barbara Schett	6–2, 1–6, 4–6
Loss	5–7	Nov 1997	Pattaya, Thailand	Tier IV	Hard	(Belgium) Dominique Van Roost	(Australia) Kristine Kunce (United States) Corina Morariu	3–6, 4–6
Win	6–7	May 1998	Madrid, Spain	Tier III	Clay	(Belgium) Dominique Van Roost	(Australia) Rachel McQuillan (Australia) Nicole Pratt	6–3, 6–1
Loss	6–8	Aug 1998	Istanbul, Turkey	Tier IV	Hard	(Sweden) Åsa Carlsson	(Germany) Meike Babel (Belgium) Laurence Courtois	0–6, 2–6
Loss	6–9	Oct 1999	São Paulo, Brazil	Tier IV	Clay	(Slovakia) Janette Husárová	(Argentina) Laura Montalvo (Argentina) Paola Suárez	7–6^{(7–1)}, 5–7, 5–7
Loss	6–10	Feb 2000	São Paulo, Brazil	Tier IV	Clay	(Slovakia) Janette Husárová	(Argentina) Laura Montalvo (Argentina) Paola Suárez	7–5, 4–6, 3–6
Win	7–10	May 2000	Strasbourg, France	Tier III	Clay	(Canada) Sonya Jeyaseelan	(South Africa) Kim Grant (Venezuela) María Vento	6–4, 6–3

== ITF finals ==
$50,000 tournaments
$25,000 tournaments
$10,000 tournaments

=== Singles (7–2) ===
Result	No.	Date	Tournament	Surface	Opponent	Score
Win	1.	16 October 1988	Santiago, Chile	Clay	(Colombia) Adriana Isaza	6–3, 6–1
Win	2.	23 October 1988	Buenos Aires, Argentina	Clay	(Argentina) Jorgelina Moreno	6–2, 6–1
Win	3.	12 June 1989	Modena, Italy	Clay	(Finland) Petra Thorén	3–6, 6–3, 6–2
Win	4.	26 June 1989	Arezzo, Italy	Clay	(Italy) Federica Bonsignori	6–4, 6–4
Loss	1.	27 November 1989	Buenos Aires, Argentina	Clay	(France) Noëlle van Lottum	5–7, 4–6
Win	5.	17 December 1995	Tacuman, Argentina	Clay	(Argentina) Paola Suárez	6–2, 6–1
Win	6.	8 August 1999	Lexington, United States	Hard	(Australia) Annabel Ellwood	6–2, 5–7, 6–1
Loss	2.	19 September 1999	Buenos Aires, Argentina	Clay	(Argentina) Paola Suárez	0–6, 5–7
Win	7.	18 October 1999	Nashville, United States	Hard	(Colombia) Catalina Castaño	6–1, 6–1

=== Doubles (4–2) ===
Result	No.	Date	Tournament	Surface	Partner	Opponents	Score
Win	1.	29 November 1987	Buenos Aires, Argentina	Clay	(Argentina) Federica Haumüller	(Argentina) Silvia Correa (Argentina) María Eugenia Vago	7–6, 6–2
Win	2.	16 October 1988	Santiago, Chile	Clay	(Argentina) Federica Haumüller	(Brazil) Rita Cruz Lima (Ecuador) Nuria Niemes	6–2, 4–6, 6–0
Loss	1.	18 June 1989	Modena, Italy	Clay	(Argentina) Debora Garat	(Argentina) Gaby Castro (Spain) Conchita Martínez	3–6, 2–6
Win	3.	19 June 1989	Brindisi, Italy	Clay	(United States) Erika deLone	(Finland) Nanne Dahlman (Australia) Rennae Stubbs	6–3, 7–6
Loss	2.	27 November 1989	Buenos Aires, Argentina	Clay	(Argentina) Andrea Tiezzi	(Argentina) Inés Gorrochategui (Argentina) María Eugenia Vago	3–6, 6–2, 4–6
Win	4.	8 August 1999	Lexington, United States	Hard	(France) Alexandra Fusai	(South Korea) Kim Eun-ha (United Kingdom) Julie Pullin	6–4, 6–1
