= Sezze =

- Comune
- Comune di Sezze
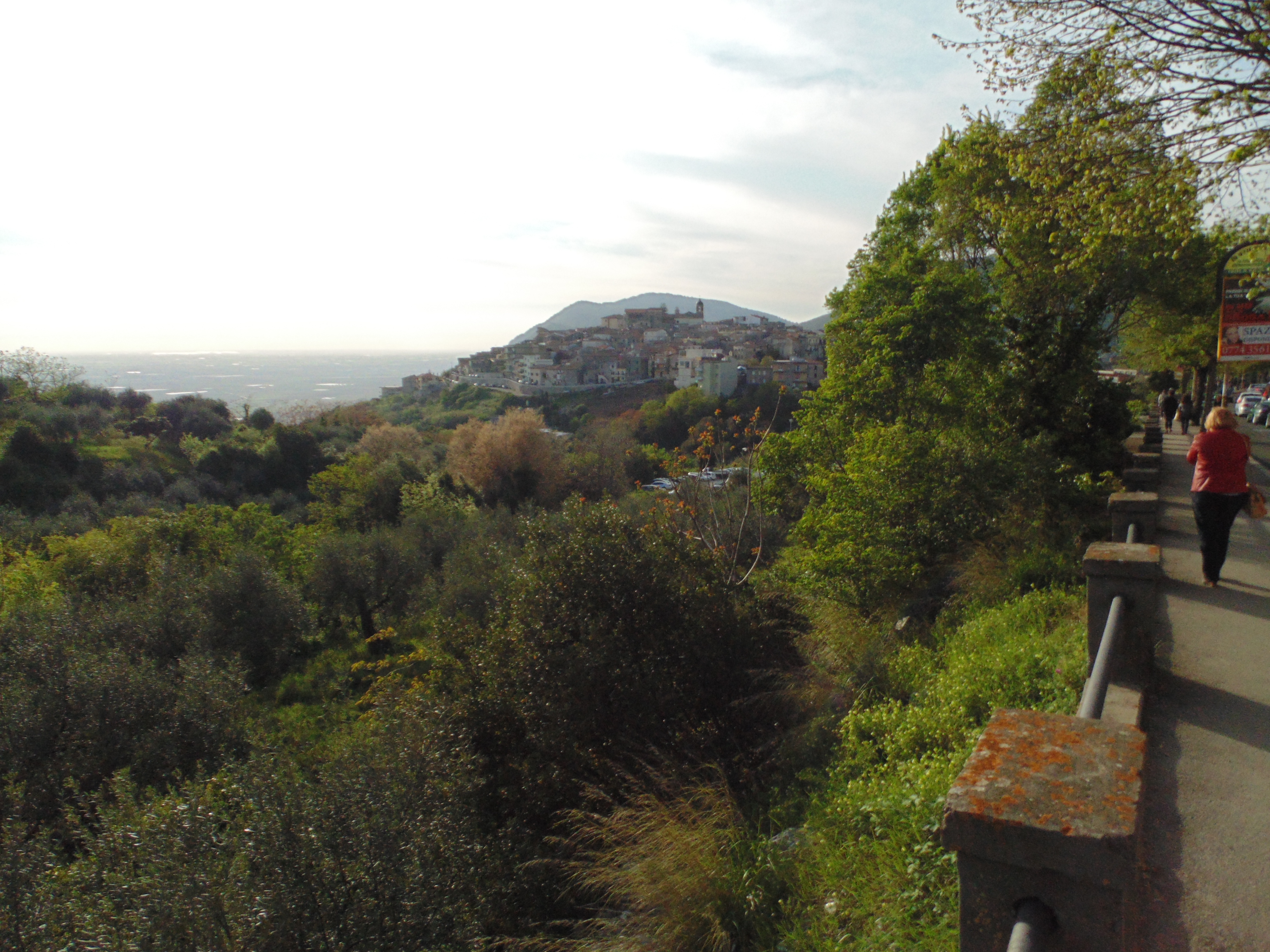
- Sezze's town hill, Monte Trevi (center), is settled since Antiquity

- Coat of arms

- Location within Italy Location within Lazio
- Coordinates: 41°30′N 13°04′E
- Country: Italy
- Region: Lazio
- Province: Latina (LT)
- Frazioni: Casali, Ceriara, Colli, Crocemoschitto, Foresta, Sezze Scalo

Government
  - Mayor: Lidano Lucidi (Civic list)

Area
  - Total: 100.47 km^{2} (38.79 sq mi)
- Elevation: 319 m (1,047 ft)

Population (31 May 2022)
  - Total: 23,622
  - Density: 235.11/km^{2} (608.94/sq mi)
- Demonym: Setini
- Time zone: UTC+1 (CET)
  - Summer (DST): UTC+2 (CEST)
- Postal code: 04010, 04018
- Dialing code: 0773
- Patron saint: St. Charles of Sezze
- Website: Official website

Sezze (from the Latin "Setia") is a town and comune in the Province of Latina, central Italy, about 65 kilometres (40 mi) south of Rome and 10 kilometres (6 mi) from the Mediterranean coast. Sezze's historical center of is on a high hill commanding the Pontine plain.

The area has been known for its fine climate since Roman times: warm and dry in summer, cool in winter.

Sezze has a station on the Rome–Formia–Naples railway; Casale di Priverno train station on the Velletri–Terracina railway is nearby. The main road connection is the SS7 highway, which bears the name of the ancient Appian Way.

== History ==
About 95-100 million years ago in the early to mid-Cenomanian, the Sezze area was a seashore between the Tethys Sea and the future Apennine Mountains. During several million years of marine transgressions, the sea inundated the region and subsequently retreated again, the sediment deposits eventually becoming dolomitised wackestones which are locally quarried in our time.

According to a legend, the mythical hero Hercules founded the town of Sezze after his victory over the Lestrigones, a population of giant cannibals living in southern Lazio. In refgerence to this founding myth, the town coat of arms features the white Nemean lion, which Hercules slew in the first labor.

The historical Setia appeared around the 5th century BC as the Volscan settlement member of the Latin League. It became a Roman colony in 382 BC and flourished because of its strategic and commercial position near the "pedemontana" way and the Appian Way, the road that connected Rome to southern Italy.

During the Civil War between Gaius Marius and Sulla, Setia supported the former and was later punished by the victorious Sulla (82 BC). In the Imperial period Setia was famous for its villas, and Martial, Juvenal and Cicero praised its wines.

According to Plutarch, Roman dictator Julius Caesar had plans to drain the wetlands around Sezze to create new farmland, but was assassinated before these plans could come to fruition. His intention was probably to cultivate grapes for wine production.

In the early Middle Ages, Sezze experienced trouble due to its location near the main road of communication. But in 956 it was freed from the Papal authority and organized itself as a commune with its own laws. Later, several popes sojourned in Sezze, including Gregory VII (1073), Paschal II (1116) and Lucius III (1182).

The semi-autonomous status lasted until, after decades of skirmishes and wars with neighboring Sermoneta and Priverno, Sezze was conquered by the troops of the Caetani family in 1381. After 12 years, the Setini revolted and exterminated the occupiers and, once free, they returned to the Pope's protection.

In 1656, after suffering the ravages of plague and raids from Spanish and Austrian troops, the population was reduced by half.

In 1690, one of Italy's first academies, the scientific-literary Academy of the Abbozzati, was founded in Sezze.

In 1798 all of Lazio was occupied by French troops. The Setini rebelled, exterminating the garrison: they avoided a bitter revenge only by paying a large sum of money.

In the late 19th century the city was annexed to the newly formed Kingdom of Italy.

During World War II, American bombardment destroyed some churches and buildings in the historical center.

== Main sights ==
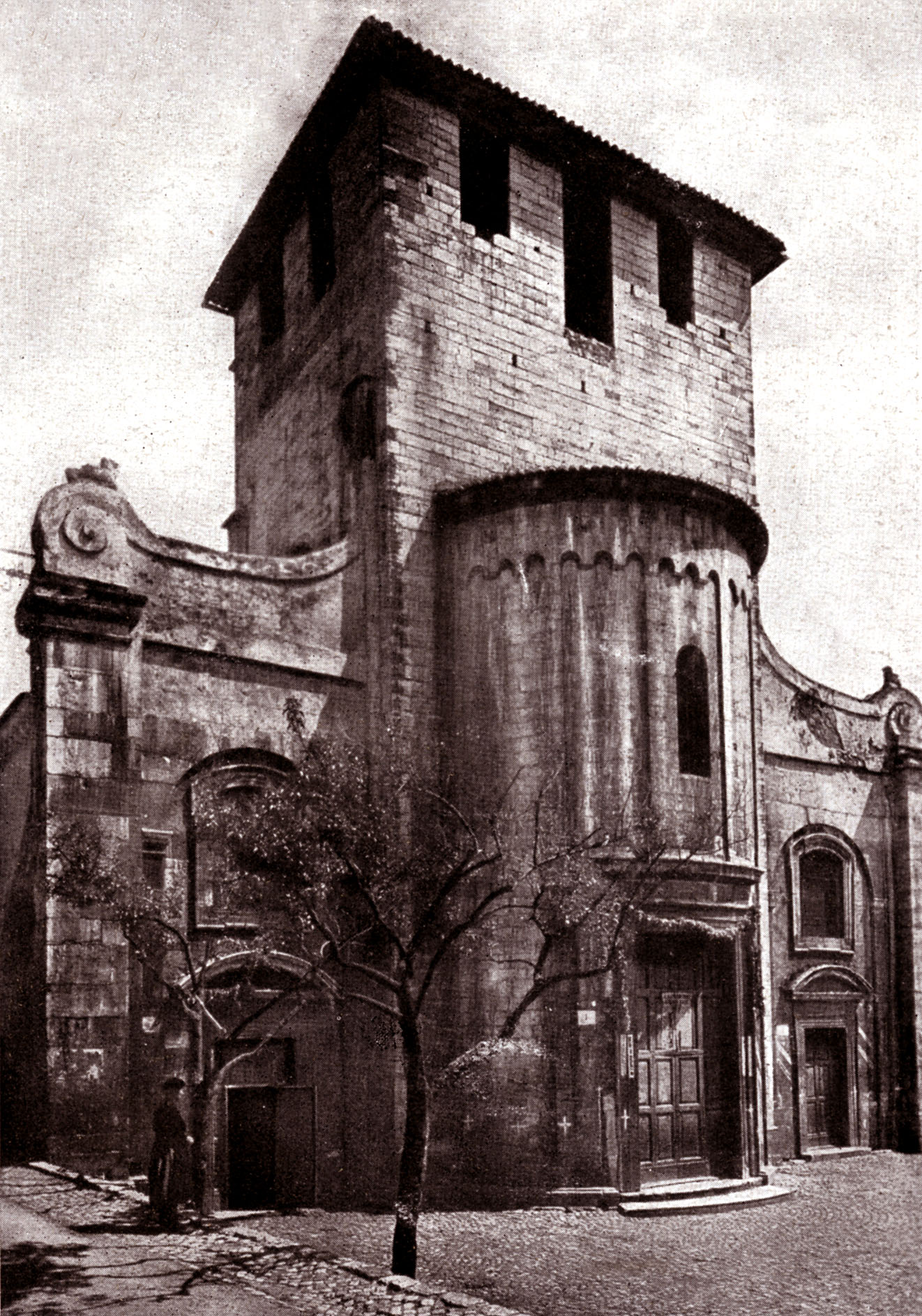
Cathedral Duomo di Sezze in a 1935 photo

Many of the original city walls still exist, built of large blocks of limestone in the polygonal style. This style is also seen in several terrace walls from a later date, indicated by the careful jointing and bossing of the blocks of which they are composed. Such intentional archaism is by no means uncommon in the neighborhood of Rome.

The modern town, occupying the ancient site, is an episcopal see, with a much-restored 13th-century Gothic cathedral.

Remains of Roman villas are at the foot of the hill (Monte Trevi) on which the town stands. The two terraces date to the end of the 2nd century BC.

In the former Cava Petrianni cave, Cretaceous dinosaur footprints almost 100 million years old are preserved. Three successionally deposited layers attest to the former presence of titanosaur sauropods and medium-sized theropods in this region. Because these rocks easily erode as soon as they are exposed, various preservation methods have been tested.

== Twin towns ==
- Kozármisleny, Hungary, since 2004
