= 1981 Federation Cup (tennis) =

International women's tennis competition

Details
- Duration: 9–15 November
- Edition: 19th

Champion
- Winning nation: United States

The 1981 Federation Cup (also known as the 1981 Federation Cup by NEC for sponsorship purposes) was the 19th edition of the most important competition between national teams in women's tennis. The tournament was held at the Tamagawa-en Racquet Club in Tokyo, Japan, from 9–15 November. The United States won their sixth consecutive title, defeating Great Britain in the final, in what was a rematch of the 1967 Federation Cup.

== Participating teams ==
Participating teams
Australia	Belgium	Brazil	Canada	China	Chinese Taipei	Czechoslovakia	Denmark
France	Great Britain	Greece	Hong Kong	Hungary	Indonesia	Ireland	Israel
Italy	Japan	Mexico	Netherlands	New Zealand	Philippines	Romania	South Korea
Soviet Union	Spain	Sweden	Switzerland	Thailand	United States	West Germany	Yugoslavia

== Draw ==
All ties were played at the Tamagawa-en Racquet Club in Tokyo, Japan, on clay courts. |}

First Round
United States	3
South Korea	0
Spain	2
Mexico	1
Indonesia	0
Israel	3
Hungary	0
Romania	3
Switzerland	3
Greece	0
New Zealand	1
Chinese Taipei	2
Brazil	3
Ireland	0
Japan	0
West Germany	3
Czechoslovakia	3
Sweden	0
Denmark	0
Soviet Union	3
France	3
Canada	0
Belgium	0
Great Britain	3
Netherlands	2
Hong Kong	1
Italy	2
Yugoslavia	1
Thailand	0
China	3
Philippines	0
Australia	3

Second Round
United States	3
Spain	0
Israel	0
Romania	3
Switzerland	3
Chinese Taipei	0
Brazil	0
West Germany	2
Czechoslovakia	1
Soviet Union	2
France	0
Great Britain	3
Netherlands	2
Italy	1
China	0
Australia	3

Quarterfinals
United States	3
Romania	0
Switzerland	2
West Germany	1
Soviet Union	1
Great Britain	2
Netherlands	0
Australia	3

Semifinals
United States	3
Switzerland	0
Great Britain	2
Australia	1

Final
United States	3
Great Britain	0

1st and 2nd round losing teams play in consolation rounds.

=== First round ===
==== United States vs. South Korea ====
United States
3
Tamagawa-en Racquet Club, Tokyo, Japan
November 1981
Har-Tru Clay (Outdoor)

South Korea
0

			1	2	3
1	(United States) (South Korea)	Andrea Jaeger; Seol Min-kyung	6; 1	6; 3
2	(United States) (South Korea)	Chris Evert Lloyd; Lee Duk-hee	6; 1	6; 3
3	(United States) (South Korea)	Rosemary Casals / Kathy Jordan; Kim Soo-ok / Lee Duk-hee	6; 2	6; 2

==== Spain vs. Mexico ====
Spain
2
Tamagawa-en Racquet Club, Tokyo, Japan
November 1981
Har-Tru Clay (Outdoor)

Mexico
1

			1	2	3
1	(Spain) (Mexico)	Vicky Baldovinos; Maluca Llamas	6; 2	3; 6	3; 6
2	(Spain) (Mexico)	Carmen Perea; Heliane Steden	6; 4	6; 2
3	(Spain) (Mexico)	Vicky Baldovinos / Carmen Perea; Maluca Llamas / Liza Riefkohl	6; 3	6; 2

==== Indonesia vs. Israel ====
Indonesia
0
Tamagawa-en Racquet Club, Tokyo, Japan
November 1981
Har-Tru Clay (Outdoor)

Israel
3

			1	2	3
1	(Indonesia) (Israel)	Suzanna Anggarkusuma; Orly Bialistozky	0; 6	5; 7
2	(Indonesia) (Israel)	Yolanda Soemarno; Rafeket Binyamini	5; 7	1; 6
3	(Indonesia) (Israel)	Lita Sugiarto / Yolanda Soemarno; Orly Bialistozky / Rafeket Binyamini	6; 4	4; 6	1; 6

==== Hungary vs. Romania ====
Hungary
0
Tamagawa-en Racquet Club, Tokyo, Japan
November 1981
Har-Tru Clay (Outdoor)

Romania
3

			1	2	3
1	(Hungary) (Romania)	Andrea Temesvári; Lucia Romanov	6; 2	2; 5		retired
2	(Hungary) (Romania)	Éva Rózsavölgyi; Virginia Ruzici	1; 6	0; 6
3	(Hungary) (Romania)	Csilla Bartos / Éva Rózsavölgyi; Florența Mihai / Virginia Ruzici	6; 0	1; 6	0; 6

==== Switzerland vs. Greece ====
Switzerland
3
Tamagawa-en Racquet Club, Tokyo, Japan
November 1981
Har-Tru Clay (Outdoor)

Greece
0

			1	2	3
1	(Switzerland) (Greece)	Claudia Pasquale; Denise Panagopoulou	6; 0	6; 1
2	(Switzerland) (Greece)	Petra Delhees; Angeliki Kanellopoulou	6; 4	6; 3
3	(Switzerland) (Greece)	Petra Delhees / Christiane Jolissaint; Angeliki Kanellopoulou / Denise Panagopoulou	6; 2	6; 3

==== New Zealand vs. Chinese Taipei ====
New Zealand
1
Tamagawa-en Racquet Club, Tokyo, Japan
November 1981
Har-Tru Clay (Outdoor)

Chinese Taipei
2

			1	2	3
1	(New Zealand) (Chinese Taipei)	Judy Chaloner; Wen Hsiu-tsuan	2; 6	4; 6
2	(New Zealand) (Chinese Taipei)	Chris Newton; Ho Chiu-mei	2; 6	2; 6
3	(New Zealand) (Chinese Taipei)	Judy Chaloner / Chris Newton; Ho Chiu-mei / Wen Hsiu-tsuan	6; 2	6; 3

==== Brazil vs. Ireland ====
Brazil
3
Tamagawa-en Racquet Club, Tokyo, Japan
November 1981
Har-Tru Clay (Outdoor)

Ireland
0

			1	2	3
1	(Brazil) (Republic of Ireland)	Cláudia Monteiro; Rhona Howett	6; 0	6; 3
2	(Brazil) (Republic of Ireland)	Patricia Medrado; Maria Bolster	6; 1	6; 0
3	(Brazil) (Republic of Ireland)	Patricia Medrado / Cláudia Monteiro; Maria Bolster / Caitríona Ruane	6; 3	6; 2

==== Japan vs. West Germany ====
Japan
0
Tamagawa-en Racquet Club, Tokyo, Japan
November 1981
Har-Tru Clay (Outdoor)

West Germany
3

			1	2	3
1	(Japan) (West Germany)	Masako Yanagi; Iris Riedel-Kuhn	4; 6	4; 6
2	(Japan) (West Germany)	Kimiyo Nomura; Bettina Bunge	2; 6	2; 6
3	(Japan) (West Germany)	Fumiko Furuhashi / Masako Yanagi; Bettina Bunge / Iris Riedel-Kuhn	7; 5	5; 7	0; 6

==== Czechoslovakia vs. Sweden ====
Czechoslovakia
3
Tamagawa-en Racquet Club, Tokyo, Japan
November 1981
Har-Tru Clay (Outdoor)

Sweden
0

			1	2	3
1	(Czechoslovakia) (Sweden)	Renáta Tomanová; Mimmi Wikstedt	6; 2	6; 4
2	(Czechoslovakia) (Sweden)	Hana Mandlíková; Elisabeth Ekblom	6; 2	6; 3
3	(Czechoslovakia) (Sweden)	Hana Mandlíková / Renáta Tomanová; Catarina Lindqvist / Mimmi Wikstedt	4; 6	7; 6	6; 2

==== Denmark vs. Soviet Union ====
Denmark
0
Tamagawa-en Racquet Club, Tokyo, Japan
November 1981
Har-Tru Clay (Outdoor)

Soviet Union
3

			1	2	3
1	(Denmark) (Soviet Union)	Tine Scheuer-Larsen; Julia Salnikova	4; 6	3; 6
2	(Denmark) (Soviet Union)	Anne-Mette Sorensen; Elena Eliseenko	5; 7	2; 6
3	(Denmark) (Soviet Union)	Birgitte Hermansen / Anne-Mette Sorensen; Svetlana Cherneva / Olga Zaitseva	0; 6	2; 6

==== France vs. Canada ====
France
3
Tamagawa-en Racquet Club, Tokyo, Japan
November 1981
Har-Tru Clay (Outdoor)

Canada
0

			1	2	3
1	(France) (Canada)	Catherine Tanvier; Karen Dewis	6; 3	6; 4
2	(France) (Canada)	Corinne Vanier; Nina Bland	6; 4	6; 7	7; 5
3	(France) (Canada)	Sophie Amiach / Corinne Vanier; Karen Dewis / Hélène Pelletier	7; 6	6; 4

==== Belgium vs. Great Britain ====
Belgium
0
Tamagawa-en Racquet Club, Tokyo, Japan
November 1981
Har-Tru Clay (Outdoor)

Great Britain
3

			1	2	3
1	(Belgium) (United Kingdom)	Ann Gabriel; Jo Durie	7; 5	3; 6	3; 6
2	(Belgium) (United Kingdom)	Marion De Witte; Virginia Wade	3; 6	3; 6
3	(Belgium) (United Kingdom)	Marion De Witte / Marlene De Wouters; Sue Barker / Jo Durie	3; 6	3; 6

==== Netherlands vs. Hong Kong ====
Netherlands
2
Tamagawa-en Racquet Club, Tokyo, Japan
November 1981
Har-Tru Clay (Outdoor)

Hong Kong
1

			1	2	3
1	(Netherlands) (Hong Kong)	Marianne van der Torre; Nancy Spelman	6; 0	6; 0
2	(Netherlands) (Hong Kong)	Marcella Mesker; Patricia Hy	6; 7	3; 6
3	(Netherlands) (Hong Kong)	Marcella Mesker / Marianne van der Torre; Patricia Hy / Ling Yuen-Yuen	6; 1	6; 1

==== Italy vs. Yugoslavia ====
Italy
2
Tamagawa-en Racquet Club, Tokyo, Japan
November 1981
Har-Tru Clay (Outdoor)

Yugoslavia
1

			1	2	3
1	(Italy) (Socialist Federal Republic of Yugoslavia)	Sabina Simmonds; Renata Šašak	7; 6	6; 1
2	(Italy) (Socialist Federal Republic of Yugoslavia)	Barbara Rossi; Mima Jaušovec	0; 6	3; 6
3	(Italy) (Socialist Federal Republic of Yugoslavia)	Patrizia Murgo / Sabina Simmonds; Mima Jaušovec / Renata Šašak	6; 3	6; 2

==== Thailand vs. China ====
Thailand
0
Tamagawa-en Racquet Club, Tokyo, Japan
November 1981
Har-Tru Clay (Outdoor)

China
3

			1	2	3
1	(Thailand) (China)	Chalada Wattana; Yu Li-Qiao	0; 6	2; 6
2	(Thailand) (China)	Ponamporn Samawanthana; Wang Ping	1; 6	0; 6
3	(Thailand) (China)	Chalada Wattana / Ponamporn Samawanthana; Li Xinyi / Hu Na	0; 6	3; 6

==== Philippines vs. Australia ====
Philippines
0
Tamagawa-en Racquet Club, Tokyo, Japan
November 1981
Har-Tru Clay (Outdoor)

Australia
3

			1	2	3
1	(Philippines) (Australia)	Marisa Sanchez; Susan Leo	0; 6	0; 6
2	(Philippines) (Australia)	Dyan Castillejo; Dianne Fromholtz	1; 6	0; 6
3	(Philippines) (Australia)	Dyan Castillejo / Gladys Imperial; Dianne Fromholtz / Anne Minter	2; 6	1; 6

=== Second round ===
==== United States vs. Spain ====
United States
3
Tamagawa-en Racquet Club, Tokyo, Japan
November 1981
Har-Tru Clay (Outdoor)

Spain
0

			1	2	3
1	(United States) (Spain)	Andrea Jaeger; Vicky Baldovinos	6; 0	6; 2
2	(United States) (Spain)	Chris Evert Lloyd; Carmen Perea	6; 2	6; 0
3	(United States) (Spain)	Rosemary Casals / Kathy Jordan; Vicky Baldovinos / Carmen Perea	6; 0	6; 3

==== Israel vs. Romania ====
Israel
0
Tamagawa-en Racquet Club, Tokyo, Japan
November 1981
Har-Tru Clay (Outdoor)

Romania
3

			1	2	3
1	(Israel) (Romania)	Orly Bialistozky; Lucia Romanov	3; 6	2; 6
2	(Israel) (Romania)	Rafeket Binyamini; Virginia Ruzici	1; 6	2; 6
3	(Israel) (Romania)	Orly Bialistozky / Rafeket Binyamini; Florența Mihai / Virginia Ruzici	3; 6	5; 7

==== Switzerland vs. Chinese Taipei ====
Switzerland
3
Tamagawa-en Racquet Club, Tokyo, Japan
November 1981
Har-Tru Clay (Outdoor)

Chinese Taipei
0

			1	2	3
1	(Switzerland) (Chinese Taipei)	Petra Delhees; Wen Hsiu-tsuan	6; 1	6; 0
2	(Switzerland) (Chinese Taipei)	Isabelle Villiger; Ho Chiu-mei	6; 2	6; 0
3	(Switzerland) (Chinese Taipei)	Petra Delhees / Christiane Jolissaint; Ho Chiu-mei / Hsieh Li-chuan	6; 0	6; 0

==== Brazil vs. West Germany ====
Brazil
0
Tamagawa-en Racquet Club, Tokyo, Japan
November 1981
Har-Tru Clay (Outdoor)

West Germany
2

			1	2	3
1	(Brazil) (West Germany)	Cláudia Monteiro; Iris Riedel-Kuhn	6; 7	1; 6
2	(Brazil) (West Germany)	Patricia Medrado; Bettina Bunge	3; 6	2; 6
3	(Brazil) (West Germany)					not played

==== Czechoslovakia vs. Soviet Union ====
Czechoslovakia
1
Tamagawa-en Racquet Club, Tokyo, Japan
November 1981
Har-Tru Clay (Outdoor)

Soviet Union
2

			1	2	3
1	(Czechoslovakia) (Soviet Union)	Renáta Tomanová; Julia Salnikova	1; 6	5; 7
2	(Czechoslovakia) (Soviet Union)	Hana Mandlíková; Elena Eliseenko	7; 6	6; 1
3	(Czechoslovakia) (Soviet Union)	Hana Mandlíková / Renáta Tomanová; Svetlana Cherneva / Olga Zaitseva	4; 6	3; 6

==== France vs. Great Britain ====
France
0
Tamagawa-en Racquet Club, Tokyo, Japan
November 1981
Har-Tru Clay (Outdoor)

Great Britain
3

			1	2	3
1	(France) (United Kingdom)	Catherine Tanvier; Virginia Wade	2; 6	3; 6
2	(France) (United Kingdom)	Corrine Vanier; Sue Barker	6; 4	2; 6	8; 10
3	(France) (United Kingdom)	Sophie Amiach / Catherine Tanvier; Sue Barker / Virginia Wade	7; 5	1; 6	2; 6

==== Netherlands vs. Italy ====
Netherlands
2
Tamagawa-en Racquet Club, Tokyo, Japan
November 1981
Har-Tru Clay (Outdoor)

Italy
1

			1	2	3
1	(Netherlands) (Italy)	Marianne van der Torre; Sabina Simmonds	4; 6	6; 1	6; 1
2	(Netherlands) (Italy)	Marcella Mesker; Barbara Rossi	7; 6	6; 2
3	(Netherlands) (Italy)	Marcella Mesker / Marianne van der Torre; Patrizia Murgo / Sabina Simmonds	4; 6	6; 7

==== China vs. Australia ====
China
0
Tamagawa-en Racquet Club, Tokyo, Japan
November 1981
Har-Tru Clay (Outdoor)

Australia
3

			1	2	3
1	(China) (Australia)	Yu Li-Qiao; Dianne Fromholtz	4; 6	2; 6
2	(China) (Australia)	Wang Ping; Wendy Turnbull	5; 7	4; 6
3	(China) (Australia)	Li Xinyi / Hu Na; Susan Leo / Wendy Turnbull	2; 6	1; 6

=== Quarterfinals ===
==== United States vs. Romania ====
United States
3
Tamagawa-en Racquet Club, Tokyo, Japan
November 1981
Har-Tru Clay (Outdoor)

Romania
0

			1	2	3
1	(United States) (Romania)	Andrea Jaeger; Lucia Romanov	6; 1	6; 0
2	(United States) (Romania)	Chris Evert Lloyd; Virginia Ruzici	6; 1	6; 2
3	(United States) (Romania)	Rosemary Casals / Kathy Jordan; Florența Mihai / Virginia Ruzici	6; 4	6; 1

==== Switzerland vs. West Germany ====
Switzerland
2
Tamagawa-en Racquet Club, Tokyo, Japan
November 1981
Har-Tru Clay (Outdoor)

West Germany
1

			1	2	3
1	(Switzerland) (West Germany)	Petra Delhees; Iris Riedel-Kuhn	7; 6	6; 0
2	(Switzerland) (West Germany)	Isabelle Villiger; Bettina Bunge	3; 6	1; 6
3	(Switzerland) (West Germany)	Petra Delhees / Christiane Jolissaint; Bettina Bunge / Iris Riedel-Kuhn	6; 2	6; 3

==== Soviet Union vs. Great Britain ====
Soviet Union
1
Tamagawa-en Racquet Club, Tokyo, Japan
November 1981
Har-Tru Clay (Outdoor)

Great Britain
2

			1	2	3
1	(Soviet Union) (United Kingdom)	Julia Salnikova; Virginia Wade	6; 4	7; 6
2	(Soviet Union) (United Kingdom)	Elena Eliseenko; Sue Barker	6; 4	4; 6	4; 6
3	(Soviet Union) (United Kingdom)	Svetlana Cherneva / Olga Zaitseva; Sue Barker / Virginia Wade	3; 6	1; 6

==== Netherlands vs. Australia ====
Netherlands
0
Tamagawa-en Racquet Club, Tokyo, Japan
November 1981
Har-Tru Clay (Outdoor)

Australia
3

			1	2	3
1	(Netherlands) (Australia)	Marianne van der Torre; Dianne Fromholtz	4; 6	3; 6
2	(Netherlands) (Australia)	Marcella Mesker; Wendy Turnbull	6; 7	6; 7
3	(Netherlands) (Australia)	Marcella Mesker / Marianne van der Torre; Susan Leo / Wendy Turnbull	4; 6	3; 6

=== Semifinals ===
==== United States vs. Switzerland ====
United States
3
Tamagawa-en Racquet Club, Tokyo, Japan
15 November 1981
Har-Tru Clay (Outdoor)

Switzerland
0

			1	2	3
1	(United States) (Switzerland)	Andrea Jaeger; Claudia Pasquale	6; 2	6; 1
2	(United States) (Switzerland)	Chris Evert Lloyd; Petra Delhees	6; 2	6; 2
3	(United States) (Switzerland)	Rosemary Casals / Kathy Jordan; Petra Delhees / Christiane Jolissaint	6; 7	6; 3	6; 4

==== Great Britain vs. Australia ====
Great Britain
2
Tamagawa-en Racquet Club, Tokyo, Japan
November 1981
Har-Tru Clay (Outdoor)

Australia
1

			1	2	3
1	(United Kingdom) (Australia)	Virginia Wade; Dianne Fromholtz	3; 6	2; 6
2	(United Kingdom) (Australia)	Sue Barker; Wendy Turnbull	7; 6	3; 6	6; 2
3	(United Kingdom) (Australia)	Sue Barker / Virginia Wade; Susan Leo / Wendy Turnbull	7; 6	6; 3

=== Final ===
==== United States vs. Great Britain ====
United States
3
Tamagawa-en Racquet Club, Tokyo, Japan
15 November 1981
Har-Tru Clay (Outdoor)

Great Britain
0

			1	2	3
1	(United States) (United Kingdom)	Andrea Jaeger; Virginia Wade	6; 3	6; 1
2	(United States) (United Kingdom)	Chris Evert Lloyd; Sue Barker	6; 2	6; 1
3	(United States) (United Kingdom)	Rosemary Casals / Kathy Jordan; Virginia Wade / Jo Durie	6; 4	7; 5

1981 Federation Cup Champions
(United States)
United States
Tenth title

== Consolation rounds ==
=== Draw ===
Consolation first round
Sweden	1
Denmark	2
Canada	0
Belgium	3
Philippines	2
Thailand	1
Yugoslavia	3
Hong Kong	0
Greece	2
New Zealand	1
Japan	3
Ireland	0
Hungary	3
Indonesia	0
Mexico	0
South Korea	3

Consolation second round
Spain	2
Denmark	1
Israel	1
Belgium	2
Brazil	3
Philippines	0
Chinese Taipei	0
Yugoslavia	3
Greece	0
Italy	3
Japan	0
China	3
Hungary
France	w/o
South Korea	1
Czechoslovakia	2

Consolation quarterfinals
Spain	2
Belgium	1
Brazil	3
Yugoslavia	0
Italy	3
China	0
Hungary	0
Czechoslovakia	3

Consolation semifinals
Spain	0
Brazil	2
Italy	0
Czechoslovakia	3

Consolation final
Brazil	0
Czechoslovakia	2

=== First round ===
==== Sweden vs. Denmark ====
Sweden
1
Tamagawa-en Racquet Club, Tokyo, Japan
November 1981
Har-Tru Clay (Outdoor)

Denmark
2

			1	2	3
1	(Sweden) (Denmark)	Catarina Lindqvist; Tine Scheuer-Larsen	6; 4	6; 1
2	(Sweden) (Denmark)	Elisabeth Ekblom; Anne-Mette Sorensen	4; 6	5; 7
3	(Sweden) (Denmark)	Catarina Lindqvist / Mimmi Wikstedt; Tine Scheuer-Larsen / Anne-Mette Sorensen	6; 7	6; 3	6; 8

==== Canada vs. Belgium ====
Canada
0
Tamagawa-en Racquet Club, Tokyo, Japan
November 1981
Har-Tru Clay (Outdoor)

Belgium
3

			1	2	3
1	(Canada) (Belgium)	Angela Walker; Ann Gabriel	4; 6	2; 6
2	(Canada) (Belgium)	Nina Bland; Marion De Witte	0; 6	3; 6
3	(Canada) (Belgium)	Karen Dewis / Hélène Pelletier; Marion De Witte / Ann Gabriel	2; 6	6; 4	4; 6

==== Philippines vs. Thailand ====
Philippines
2
Tamagawa-en Racquet Club, Tokyo, Japan
November 1981
Har-Tru Clay (Outdoor)

Thailand
1

			1	2	3
1	(Philippines) (Thailand)	Marisa Sanchez; Chalada Wattana	6; 1	2; 6	4; 6
2	(Philippines) (Thailand)	Dyan Castillejo; Ponamporn Samawanthana	6; 1	6; 3
3	(Philippines) (Thailand)	Dyan Castillejo / Gladys Imperial; Chalada Wattana / Ponamporn Samawanthana	7; 5	6; 2

==== Yugoslavia vs. Hong Kong ====
Yugoslavia
3
Tamagawa-en Racquet Club, Tokyo, Japan
November 1981
Har-Tru Clay (Outdoor)

Hong Kong
0

			1	2	3
1	(Socialist Federal Republic of Yugoslavia) (Hong Kong)	Sabrina Goleš; Nancy Spelman	6; 3	6; 3
2	(Socialist Federal Republic of Yugoslavia) (Hong Kong)	Renata Šašak; Patricia Hy	6; 1	6; 2
3	(Socialist Federal Republic of Yugoslavia) (Hong Kong)	Sabrina Goleš / Renata Šašak; Patricia Hy / Ling Yuen-Yuen	6; 1	7; 6

==== Greece vs. New Zealand ====
Greece
2
Tamagawa-en Racquet Club, Tokyo, Japan
November 1981
Har-Tru Clay (Outdoor)

New Zealand
1

			1	2	3
1	(Greece) (New Zealand)	Denise Panagopoulou; Judy Chaloner	6; 3	2; 6	4; 6
2	(Greece) (New Zealand)	Angeliki Kanellopoulou; Chris Newton	6; 4	6; 4
3	(Greece) (New Zealand)	Angeliki Kanellopoulou / Denise Panagopoulou; Chris Newton / Linda Stewart	6; 3	6; 3

==== Japan vs. Ireland ====
Japan
3
Tamagawa-en Racquet Club, Tokyo, Japan
November 1981
Har-Tru Clay (Outdoor)

Ireland
0

			1	2	3
1	(Japan) (Republic of Ireland)	Masaki Yanagi; Caitríona Ruane	6; 1	6; 1
2	(Japan) (Republic of Ireland)	Kiyoko Nomura; Maria Bolster	6; 3	7; 5
3	(Japan) (Republic of Ireland)	Fumiko Furuhashi / Masaki Yanagi; Maria Bolster / Rhona Howett	6; 1	6; 0

==== Hungary vs. Indonesia ====
Hungary
0
Tamagawa-en Racquet Club, Tokyo, Japan
November 1981
Har-Tru Clay (Outdoor)

Indonesia
3

			1	2	3
1	(Hungary) (Indonesia)	Csilla Bartos; Suzanna Anggarkusuma	6; 4	3; 6	6; 2
2	(Hungary) (Indonesia)	Éva Rózsavölgyi; Yolanda Soemarno	6; 3	6; 3
3	(Hungary) (Indonesia)	Csilla Bartos / Éva Rózsavölgyi; Suzanna Anggarkusuma / Sri Utaminingsih	6; 4	6; 2

==== Mexico vs. South Korea ====
Mexico
0
Tamagawa-en Racquet Club, Tokyo, Japan
November 1981
Har-Tru Clay (Outdoor)

South Korea
3

			1	2	3
1	(Mexico) (South Korea)	Maluca Llamas; Kim Soo-ok	2; 6	2; 6
2	(Mexico) (South Korea)	Heliane Steden; Lee Duk-hee	2; 6	6; 4	1; 6
3	(Mexico) (South Korea)	Liza Riefkohl / Heliane Steden; Han Eun-sook / Kim Soo-ok	3; 6	2; 6

=== Second round ===
==== Spain vs. Denmark ====
Spain
2
Tamagawa-en Racquet Club, Tokyo, Japan
November 1981
Har-Tru Clay (Outdoor)

Denmark
1

			1	2	3
1	(Spain) (Denmark)	Vicky Baldovinos; Tine Scheuer-Larsen	6; 2	2; 6	6; 1
2	(Spain) (Denmark)	Carmen Perea; Anne-Mette Sorensen	3; 6	6; 7
3	(Spain) (Denmark)	Vicky Baldovinos / Carmen Perea; Tine Scheuer-Larsen / Anne-Mette Sorensen	6; 1	4; 6	6; 4

==== Israel vs. Belgium ====
Israel
1
Tamagawa-en Racquet Club, Tokyo, Japan
November 1981
Har-Tru Clay (Outdoor)

Belgium
2

			1	2	3
1	(Israel) (Belgium)	Orly Bialistozky; Ann Gabriel	1; 6	0; 6
2	(Israel) (Belgium)	Rafeket Binyamini; Marion De Witte	6; 2	1; 6	2; 6
3	(Israel) (Belgium)	Orly Bialistozky / Rafeket Binyamini; Marion De Witte / Ann Gabriel	7; 5	6; 2

==== Brazil vs. Philippines ====
Brazil
3
Tamagawa-en Racquet Club, Tokyo, Japan
November 1981
Har-Tru Clay (Outdoor)

Philippines
0

			1	2	3
1	(Brazil) (Philippines)	Cláudia Monteiro; Gladys Imperial	6; 1	6; 0
2	(Brazil) (Philippines)	Patricia Medrado; Dyan Castillejo	6; 1	6; 3
3	(Brazil) (Philippines)	Patricia Medrado / Cláudia Monteiro; Dyan Castillejo / Marisa Sanchez	6; 2	6; 4

==== Chinese Taipei vs. Yugoslavia ====
Chinese Taipei
0
Tamagawa-en Racquet Club, Tokyo, Japan
November 1981
Har-Tru Clay (Outdoor)

Yugoslavia
3

			1	2	3
1	(Chinese Taipei) (Socialist Federal Republic of Yugoslavia)	Wen Hsiu-tsuan; Sabrina Goleš	3; 6	0; 3		retired
2	(Chinese Taipei) (Socialist Federal Republic of Yugoslavia)	Ho Chiu-mei; Renata Šašak	1; 6	2; 6
3	(Chinese Taipei) (Socialist Federal Republic of Yugoslavia)	Hsieh Li-chuan / Hsu Mei-chu; Sabrina Goleš / Renata Šašak	2; 6	1; 6

==== Greece vs. Italy ====
Greece
0
Tamagawa-en Racquet Club, Tokyo, Japan
November 1981
Har-Tru Clay (Outdoor)

Italy
3

			1	2	3
1	(Greece) (Italy)	Denise Panagopoulou; Sabina Simmonds	0; 6	2; 6
2	(Greece) (Italy)	Angeliki Kanellopoulou; Barbara Rossi	2; 6	4; 6
3	(Greece) (Italy)	Angeliki Kanellopoulou / Denise Panagopoulou; Patrizia Murgo / Sabina Simmonds	1; 6	2; 6

==== Japan vs. China ====
Japan
0
Tamagawa-en Racquet Club, Tokyo, Japan
November 1981
Har-Tru Clay (Outdoor)

China
3

			1	2	3
1	(Japan) (China)	Masaki Yanagi; Hu Na	6; 4	4; 6	2; 6
2	(Japan) (China)	Kiyoko Nomura; Yu Li-Qiao	2; 6	7; 6	6; 8
3	(Japan) (China)	Fumiko Furuhashi / Masaki Yanagi; Li Xinyi / Hu Na	6; 3	5; 7	5; 7

==== South Korea vs. Czechoslovakia ====
South Korea
1
Tamagawa-en Racquet Club, Tokyo, Japan
November 1981
Har-Tru Clay (Outdoor)

Czechoslovakia
2

			1	2	3
1	(South Korea) (Czechoslovakia)	Kim Soo-ok; Kateřina Böhmová	6; 3	2; 6	6; 3
2	(South Korea) (Czechoslovakia)	Lee Duk-hee; Helena Suková	2; 6	5; 7
3	(South Korea) (Czechoslovakia)	Han Eun-sook / Kim Soo-ok; Hana Mandlíková / Helena Suková	4; 6	7; 5	0; 6

=== Quarterfinals ===
==== Spain vs. Belgium ====
Spain
2
Tamagawa-en Racquet Club, Tokyo, Japan
November 1981
Har-Tru Clay (Outdoor)

Belgium
1

			1	2	3
1	(Spain) (Belgium)	Vicky Baldovinos; Ann Gabriel	1; 6	2; 6
2	(Spain) (Belgium)	Carmen Perea; Marion De Witte	6; 0	6; 4
3	(Spain) (Belgium)	Vicky Baldovinos / Carmen Perea; Marion De Witte / Ann Gabriel	6; 1	6; 0

==== Brazil vs. Yugoslavia ====
Brazil
3
Tamagawa-en Racquet Club, Tokyo, Japan
November 1981
Har-Tru Clay (Outdoor)

Yugoslavia
0

			1	2	3
1	(Brazil) (Socialist Federal Republic of Yugoslavia)	Cláudia Monteiro; Sabrina Goleš	6; 2	6; 7	6; 2
2	(Brazil) (Socialist Federal Republic of Yugoslavia)	Patricia Medrado; Renata Šašak	6; 2	6; 3
3	(Brazil) (Socialist Federal Republic of Yugoslavia)	Patricia Medrado / Cláudia Monteiro; Sabrina Goleš / Renata Šašak	4; 6	6; 3	6; 3

==== Italy vs. China ====
Italy
3
Tamagawa-en Racquet Club, Tokyo, Japan
November 1981
Har-Tru Clay (Outdoor)

China
0

			1	2	3
1	(Italy) (China)	Sabina Simmonds; Yu Li-Qiao	6; 1	6; 3
2	(Italy) (China)	Barbara Rossi; Wang Ping	6; 7	6; 0	6; 2
3	(Italy) (China)	Patrizia Murgo / Sabina Simmonds; Li Xinyi / Hu Na	6; 1	6; 2

==== Hungary vs. Czechoslovakia ====
Hungary
0
Tamagawa-en Racquet Club, Tokyo, Japan
November 1981
Har-Tru Clay (Outdoor)

Czechoslovakia
3

			1	2	3
1	(Hungary) (Czechoslovakia)	Csilla Bartos; Kateřina Böhmová	4; 6	3; 6
2	(Hungary) (Czechoslovakia)	Éva Rózsavölgyi; Helena Suková	4; 6	2; 6
3	(Hungary) (Czechoslovakia)	Csilla Bartos / Éva Rózsavölgyi; Hana Mandlíková / Renáta Tomanová	1; 6	3; 6

=== Semifinals ===
==== Spain vs. Brazil ====
Spain
0
Tamagawa-en Racquet Club, Tokyo, Japan
November 1981
Har-Tru Clay (Outdoor)

Brazil
2

			1	2	3
1	(Spain) (Brazil)	Vicky Baldovinos; Cláudia Monteiro	3; 6	1; 6
2	(Spain) (Brazil)	Carmen Perea; Patricia Medrado	5; 7	7; 5	5; 7
3	(Spain) (Brazil)

==== Italy vs. Czechoslovakia ====
Italy
0
Tamagawa-en Racquet Club, Tokyo, Japan
November 1981
Har-Tru Clay (Outdoor)

Czechoslovakia
3

			1	2	3
1	(Italy) (Czechoslovakia)	Sabina Simmonds; Helena Suková	6; 2	0; 6	3; 6
2	(Italy) (Czechoslovakia)	Barbara Rossi; Hana Mandlíková	6; 4	4; 6	4; 6
3	(Italy) (Czechoslovakia)	Patrizia Murgo / Sabina Simmonds; Helena Suková / Renáta Tomanová	6; 4	5; 7	1; 6

=== Final ===
==== Brazil vs. Czechoslovakia ====
Brazil
0
Tamagawa-en Racquet Club, Tokyo, Japan
November 1981
Har-Tru Clay (Outdoor)

Czechoslovakia
2

			1	2	3
1	(Brazil) (Czechoslovakia)	Cláudia Monteiro; Helena Suková	3; 6	1; 6
2	(Brazil) (Czechoslovakia)	Patricia Medrado; Hana Mandlíková	5; 7	3; 6
3	(Brazil) (Czechoslovakia)					not played
