= 1982 Federation Cup (tennis) =

International women's tennis competition

Details
- Duration: 19 – 25 July
- Edition: 20th

Champion
- Winning nation: United States

The 1982 Federation Cup was the 20th edition of the most important competition between national teams in women's tennis. The tournament was held at the Decathlon Club in Santa Clara, California, United States, 19–25 July. The United States won their record seventh consecutive title, defeating West Germany in the final without losing a rubber.

== Participating teams ==
Participating teams
Argentina	Australia	Austria	Belgium	Brazil	Canada	China	Chinese Taipei
Czechoslovakia	Denmark	France	Great Britain	Hong Kong	Indonesia	Israel	Italy
Japan	Mexico	Netherlands	New Zealand	Peru	Philippines	Portugal	Senegal
South Korea	Soviet Union	Spain	Sweden	Switzerland	United States	West Germany	Yugoslavia

== Draw ==
All ties were played at the Decathlon Club in Santa Clara, CA, United States on hard courts. |}

First Round
United States	3
Indonesia	0
Belgium	1
Mexico	2
Brazil	2
France	0
Hong Kong	2
Chinese Taipei	1
Czechoslovakia	2
Canada	1
Philippines	3
Senegal	0
Austria	1
Israel	2
Italy	1
Great Britain	2
Switzerland	2
New Zealand	1
Sweden
Yugoslavia	w/o
Japan	0
China	3
Portugal	0
West Germany	3
Soviet Union	3
Spain	0
Peru	2
Argentina	1
Denmark	0
Netherlands	3
South Korea	0
Australia	3

Second Round
United States	3
Mexico	0
Brazil	3
Hong Kong	0
Czechoslovakia	3
Philippines	0
Israel	0
Great Britain	3
Switzerland	2
Sweden	1
China	0
West Germany	3
Soviet Union	2
Peru	1
Netherlands	0
Australia	3

Quarterfinals
United States	3
Brazil	0
Czechoslovakia	2
Great Britain	1
Switzerland	0
West Germany	3
Soviet Union	0
Australia	3

Semifinals
United States	3
Czechoslovakia	0
West Germany	3
Australia	0

Final
United States	3
West Germany	0

1st Round losing teams play in consolation rounds

=== First round ===
==== United States vs. Indonesia ====
United States
3
Decathlon Club, Santa Clara, California
July 1982
Hard (outdoor)

Indonesia
0

			1	2	3
1	(United States) (Indonesia)	Chris Evert Lloyd; Sri Utaminingsih	6; 2	6; 1
2	(United States) (Indonesia)	Martina Navratilova; Suzanna Anggarkusuma	6; 0	6; 0
3	(United States) (Indonesia)	Chris Evert Lloyd / Martina Navratilova; Suzanna Anggarkusuma / Sri Utaminingsih	6; 0	6; 0

==== Belgium vs. Mexico ====
Belgium
1
Decathlon Club, Santa Clara, California
July 1982
Hard (outdoor)

Mexico
2

			1	2	3
1	(Belgium) (Mexico)	Ann Gabriel; Claudia Hernández	2; 6	3; 6
2	(Belgium) (Mexico)	Marion De Witte; Heliane Steden	4; 6	4; 6
3	(Belgium) (Mexico)	Marion De Witte / Ingrid Willems; Claudia Hernández / Heliane Steden	6; 3	6; 3

==== Brazil vs. France ====
Brazil
2
Decathlon Club, Santa Clara, California
July 1982
Hard (outdoor)

France
0

			1	2	3
1	(Brazil) (France)	Cláudia Monteiro; Frédérique Thibault	6; 2	6; 2
2	(Brazil) (France)	Patricia Medrado; Corrine Vanier	6; 3	7; 5
3	(Brazil) (France)					not played

==== Hong Kong vs. Chinese Taipei ====
Hong Kong
2
Decathlon Club, Santa Clara, California
July 1982
Hard (outdoor)

Chinese Taipei
1

			1	2	3
1	(Hong Kong) (Chinese Taipei)	Nancy Spelman; Wen Hsiu-tsuan	0; 6	1; 6
2	(Hong Kong) (Chinese Taipei)	Patricia Hy; Ho Chiu-mei	6; 1	6; 1
3	(Hong Kong) (Chinese Taipei)	Patricia Hy / Ling Yuen-Yuen; Ho Chiu-mei / Wen Hsiu-tsuan	6; 3	4; 6	6; 4

==== Czechoslovakia vs. Canada ====
Czechoslovakia
2
Decathlon Club, Santa Clara, California
July 1982
Hard (outdoor)

Canada
1

			1	2	3
1	(Czechoslovakia) (Canada)	Helena Suková; Carling Bassett	6; 1	5; 7	6; 2
2	(Czechoslovakia) (Canada)	Hana Mandlíková; Marjorie Blackwood	6; 2	6; 1
3	(Czechoslovakia) (Canada)	Iva Budařová / Helena Suková; Marjorie Blackwood / Hélène Pelletier	3; 6	6; 7

==== Philippines vs. Senegal ====
Philippines
3
Decathlon Club, Santa Clara, California
July 1982
Hard (outdoor)

Senegal
0

			1	2	3
1	(Philippines) (Senegal)	Dyan Castillejo; Sadia Berthe-Hoffman	6; 4	6; 1
2	(Philippines) (Senegal)	Pia Tamayo; Saida Berthe	6; 0	6; 1
3	(Philippines) (Senegal)	Jackie Castillejo / Jeanette Gomez; Sadia Berthe-Hoffman / Neissa Doumbia	6; 4	6; 1

==== Austria vs. Israel ====
Austria
1
Decathlon Club, Santa Clara, California
July 1982
Hard (outdoor)

Israel
2

			1	2	3
1	(Austria) (Israel)	Maria Geyer; Rafeket Binyamini	2; 6	3; 6
2	(Austria) (Israel)	Andrea Pesak; Orly Bialistozky	3; 6	2; 6
3	(Austria) (Israel)	Andrea Pesak / Ingrid Sommerauer; Orly Bialistozky / Rafeket Binyamini	7; 6	6; 2

==== Italy vs. Great Britain ====
Italy
1
Decathlon Club, Santa Clara, California
July 1982
Hard (outdoor)

Great Britain
2

			1	2	3
1	(Italy) (United Kingdom)	Barbara Rossi; Virginia Wade	3; 6	1; 6
2	(Italy) (United Kingdom)	Sabina Simmonds; Jo Durie	4; 6	7; 6	6; 1
3	(Italy) (United Kingdom)	Patrizia Murgo / Sabina Simmonds; Jo Durie / Anne Hobbs	4; 6	3; 6

==== Switzerland vs. New Zealand ====
Switzerland
2
Decathlon Club, Santa Clara, California
July 1982
Hard (outdoor)

New Zealand
1

			1	2	3
1	(Switzerland) (New Zealand)	Petra Delhees; Belinda Cordwell	6; 4	6; 4
2	(Switzerland) (New Zealand)	Isabelle Villiger; Linda Stewart	1; 6	6; 2	2; 6
3	(Switzerland) (New Zealand)	Petra Delhees / Christiane Jolissaint; Judy Chaloner / Linda Stewart	6; 1	6; 0

==== Japan vs. China ====
Japan
0
Decathlon Club, Santa Clara, California
July 1982
Hard (outdoor)

China
3

			1	2	3
1	(Japan) (China)	Kumiko Okamato; Hu Na	1; 6	2; 6
2	(Japan) (China)	Masako Yanagi; Yu Li-Qiao	6; 4	5; 7	3; 6
3	(Japan) (China)	Etsuko Inoue / Masako Yanagi; Li Xinyi / Hu Na	3; 6	2; 6

==== Portugal vs. West Germany ====
Portugal
0
Decathlon Club, Santa Clara, California
July 1982
Hard (outdoor)

West Germany
3

			1	2	3
1	(Portugal) (West Germany)	Deborah Fiúza; Claudia Kohde-Kilsch	0; 6	0; 6
2	(Portugal) (West Germany)	Leonora Peralta; Bettina Bunge	0; 6	0; 6
3	(Portugal) (West Germany)	Deborah Fiúza / Leonora Peralta; Claudia Kohde-Kilsch / Eva Pfaff	0; 6	1; 6

==== Soviet Union vs. Spain ====
Soviet Union
3
Decathlon Club, Santa Clara, California
July 1982
Hard (outdoor)

Spain
0

			1	2	3
1	(Soviet Union) (Spain)	Julia Salnikova; Vicky Baldovinos	6; 3	6; 3
2	(Soviet Union) (Spain)	Elena Eliseenko; Carmen Perea	6; 2	3; 6	6; 2
3	(Soviet Union) (Spain)	Svetlana Cherneva / Ludmila Makarova; Ana Almansa / Begonia Erana	6; 3	6; 1

==== Peru vs. Argentina ====
Peru
2
Decathlon Club, Santa Clara, California
July 1982
Hard (outdoor)

Argentina
1

			1	2	3
1	(Peru) (Argentina)	Pilar Vásquez; Emilse Raponi	3; 6	6; 3	2; 6
2	(Peru) (Argentina)	Laura Gildemeister; Ivanna Madruga Ossès	6; 4	6; 4
3	(Peru) (Argentina)	Laura Gildemeister / Pilar Vásquez; Ivanna Madruga Ossès / Adriana Villagrán Reami	6; 0	6; 4

==== Denmark vs. Netherlands ====
Denmark
0
Decathlon Club, Santa Clara, California
July 1982
Hard (outdoor)

Netherlands
3

			1	2	3
1	(Denmark) (Netherlands)	Dorte Ekner; Marianne van der Torre	6; 2	2; 6	1; 6
2	(Denmark) (Netherlands)	Anne-Mette Sorensen; Marcella Mesker	6; 7	6; 3	2; 6
3	(Denmark) (Netherlands)	Dorte Ekner / Anne-Mette Sorensen; Marcella Mesker / Betty Stöve	2; 6	4; 6

==== South Korea vs. Australia ====
South Korea
0
Decathlon Club, Santa Clara, California
July 1982
Hard (outdoor)

Australia
3

			1	2	3
1	(South Korea) (Australia)	Seol Min-kyung; Susan Leo	3; 6	6; 7
2	(South Korea) (Australia)	Kim Soo-ok; Evonne Goolagong Cawley	0; 6	2; 6
3	(South Korea) (Australia)	Kim Soo-ok / Shin Soon-oh; Susan Leo / Wendy Turnbull	3; 6	3; 6

=== Second round ===
==== United States vs. Mexico ====
United States
3
Decathlon Club, Santa Clara, California
July 1982
Hard (outdoor)

Mexico
0

			1	2	3
1	(United States) (Mexico)	Chris Evert Lloyd; Claudia Hernández	6; 2	6; 2
2	(United States) (Mexico)	Martina Navratilova; Heliane Steden	7; 5	6; 0
3	(United States) (Mexico)	Andrea Leand / Martina Navratilova; Claudia Hernández / Heliane Steden	6; 2	6; 0

==== Hong Kong vs. Brazil ====
Hong Kong
0
Decathlon Club, Santa Clara, California
July 1982
Hard (outdoor)

Brazil
3

			1	2	3
1	(Hong Kong) (Brazil)	Nancy Spelman; Cláudia Monteiro	1; 6	1; 6
2	(Hong Kong) (Brazil)	Patricia Hy; Patricia Medrado	3; 6	3; 6
3	(Hong Kong) (Brazil)	Ling Yuen-Yuen / Nancy Spelman; Vera Lúcia Giugni / Patricia Medrado	0; 6	3; 6

==== Czechoslovakia vs. Philippines ====
Czechoslovakia
3
Decathlon Club, Santa Clara, California
July 1982
Hard (outdoor)

Philippines
0

			1	2	3
1	(Czechoslovakia) (Philippines)	Helena Suková; Dyan Castillejo	6; 1	6; 2
2	(Czechoslovakia) (Philippines)	Hana Mandlíková; Pia Tamayo	2; 6	6; 2	6; 0
3	(Czechoslovakia) (Philippines)	Hana Mandlíková / Helena Suková; Dyan Castillejo / Pia Tamayo	6; 3	6; 0

==== Israel vs. Great Britain ====
Israel
0
Decathlon Club, Santa Clara, California
July 1982
Hard (outdoor)

Great Britain
3

			1	2	3
1	(Israel) (United Kingdom)	Rafeket Binyamini; Jo Durie	4; 6	2; 6
2	(Israel) (United Kingdom)	Orly Bialistozky; Sue Barker	1; 6	3; 6
3	(Israel) (United Kingdom)	Orly Bialistozky / Rafeket Binyamini; Anne Hobbs / Virginia Wade	2; 6	1; 6

==== Switzerland vs. Sweden ====
Switzerland
2
Decathlon Club, Santa Clara, California
July 1982
Hard (outdoor)

Sweden
1

			1	2	3
1	(Switzerland) (Sweden)	Christiane Jolissaint; Catarina Lindqvist	6; 4	6; 1
2	(Switzerland) (Sweden)	Petra Delhees; Lena Sandin	6; 0	6; 4
3	(Switzerland) (Sweden)	Petra Delhees / Christiane Jolissaint; Catrin Jexell / Lena Sandin	6; 4	2; 6	3; 6

==== China vs. West Germany ====
China
0
Decathlon Club, Santa Clara, California
July 1982
Hard (outdoor)

West Germany
3

			1	2	3
1	(China) (West Germany)	Yu Li-Qiao; Claudia Kohde-Kilsch	3; 6	6; 4	3; 6
2	(China) (West Germany)	Wang Ping; Bettina Bunge	1; 6	2; 6
3	(China) (West Germany)	Li Xinyi / Yu Li-Qiao; Bettina Bunge / Claudia Kohde-Kilsch	3; 6	5; 7

==== Soviet Union vs. Peru ====
Soviet Union
2
Decathlon Club, Santa Clara, California
July 1982
Hard (outdoor)

Peru
1

			1	2	3
1	(Soviet Union) (Peru)	Julia Salnikova; Pilar Vásquez	7; 5	6; 3
2	(Soviet Union) (Peru)	Elena Eliseenko; Laura Gildemeister	3; 6	4; 6
3	(Soviet Union) (Peru)	Ludmila Makarova / Julia Salnikova; Laura Gildemeister / Pilar Vásquez	2; 6	6; 4	6; 3

==== Netherlands vs. Australia ====
Netherlands
0
Decathlon Club, Santa Clara, California
July 1982
Hard (outdoor)

Australia
3

			1	2	3
1	(Netherlands) (Australia)	Marianne van der Torre; Dianne Fromholtz	4; 6	3; 6
2	(Netherlands) (Australia)	Marcella Mesker; Evonne Goolagong Cawley	4; 6	2; 6
3	(Netherlands) (Australia)	Marcella Mesker / Betty Stöve; Susan Leo / Wendy Turnbull	4; 6	3; 6

=== Quarterfinals ===
==== United States vs. Brazil ====
United States
3
Decathlon Club, Santa Clara, California
July 1982
Hard (outdoor)

Brazil
0

			1	2	3
1	(United States) (Brazil)	Chris Evert Lloyd; Cláudia Monteiro	6; 3	6; 1
2	(United States) (Brazil)	Martina Navratilova; Patricia Medrado	6; 0	6; 3
3	(United States) (Brazil)	Chris Evert Lloyd / Martina Navratilova; Patricia Medrado / Cláudia Monteiro	6; 2	6; 0

==== Czechoslovakia vs. Great Britain ====
Czechoslovakia
2
Decathlon Club, Santa Clara, California
July 1982
Hard (outdoor)

Great Britain
1

			1	2	3
1	(Czechoslovakia) (United Kingdom)	Helena Suková; Jo Durie	6; 3	6; 2
2	(Czechoslovakia) (United Kingdom)	Hana Mandlíková; Sue Barker	6; 7	7; 6	6; 3
3	(Czechoslovakia) (United Kingdom)	Iva Budařová / Helena Suková; Jo Durie / Anne Hobbs	2; 6	6; 4	3; 6

==== Switzerland vs. West Germany ====
Switzerland
0
Decathlon Club, Santa Clara, California
July 1982
Hard (outdoor)

West Germany
3

			1	2	3
1	(Switzerland) (West Germany)	Christiane Jolissaint; Claudia Kohde-Kilsch	3; 6	0; 6
2	(Switzerland) (West Germany)	Petra Delhees; Bettina Bunge	1; 6	1; 6
3	(Switzerland) (West Germany)	Petra Delhees / Christiane Jolissaint; Bettina Bunge / Claudia Kohde-Kilsch	4; 6	2; 6

==== Soviet Union vs. Australia ====
Soviet Union
0
Decathlon Club, Santa Clara, California
July 1982
Hard (outdoor)

Australia
3

			1	2	3
1	(Soviet Union) (Australia)	Julia Salnikova; Dianne Fromholtz	4; 6	2; 6
2	(Soviet Union) (Australia)	Ludmila Makarova; Wendy Turnbull	2; 6	2; 6
3	(Soviet Union) (Australia)	Svetlana Cherneva / Elena Eliseenko; Evonne Goolagong Cawley / Susan Leo	5; 7	4; 6

=== Semifinals ===
==== United States vs. Czechoslovakia ====
United States
3
Decathlon Club, Santa Clara, California
July 1982
Hard (outdoor)

Czechoslovakia
0

			1	2	3
1	(United States) (Czechoslovakia)	Chris Evert Lloyd; Helena Suková	6; 1	6; 2
2	(United States) (Czechoslovakia)	Martina Navratilova; Hana Mandlíková	6; 4	0; 6	6; 1
3	(United States) (Czechoslovakia)	Chris Evert Lloyd / Martina Navratilova; Hana Mandlíková / Helena Suková	6; 3	6; 2

==== West Germany vs. Australia ====
West Germany
3
Decathlon Club, Santa Clara, California
July 1982
Hard (outdoor)

Australia
0

			1	2	3
1	(West Germany) (Australia)	Claudia Kohde-Kilsch; Dianne Fromholtz	4; 6	6; 3	6; 2
2	(West Germany) (Australia)	Bettina Bunge; Evonne Goolagong Cawley	6; 3	7; 6
3	(West Germany) (Australia)	Bettina Bunge / Eva Pfaff; Susan Leo / Wendy Turnbull	6; 4	0; 6	6; 4

=== Final ===
==== United States vs. West Germany ====
United States
3
Decathlon Club, Santa Clara, California
25 July 1982
Hard (outdoor)

West Germany
0

			1	2	3
1	(United States) (West Germany)	Chris Evert Lloyd; Claudia Kohde-Kilsch	2; 6	6; 1	6; 3
2	(United States) (West Germany)	Martina Navratilova; Bettina Bunge	6; 4	6; 4
3	(United States) (West Germany)	Chris Evert Lloyd / Martina Navratilova; Bettina Bunge / Claudia Kohde-Kilsch	3; 6	6; 1	6; 2

1982 Federation Cup Champions
(United States)
United States
Eleventh title

== Consolation rounds ==
=== Draw ===
Consolation first round
Argentina	2
Senegal	0
Chinese Taipei	2
New Zealand	1
Canada	3
Denmark	0
Japan	3
Indonesia	0
Spain	2
South Korea	1
Austria	0
France	3
Portugal	0
Belgium	3

Consolation quarterfinals
Argentina	3
Chinese Taipei	0
Canada	3
Japan	0
Spain	1
France	2
Belgium	0
Italy	3

Consolation semifinals
Argentina	1
Canada	2
France	2
Italy	1

Consolation final
Canada	1
France	2

=== First round ===
==== Argentina vs. Senegal ====
Argentina
2
Decathlon Club, Santa Clara, California
July 1982
Hard (outdoor)

Senegal
0

			1	2	3
1	(Argentina) (Senegal)	Adriana Villagrán Reami; Sadia Berthe-Hoffman	6; 0	6; 3
2	(Argentina) (Senegal)	Emilse Raponi; Saida Berthe	6; 1	6; 1
3	(Argentina) (Senegal)					not played

==== Chinese Taipei vs. New Zealand ====
Chinese Taipei
2
Decathlon Club, Santa Clara, California
July 1982
Hard (outdoor)

New Zealand
1

			1	2	3
1	(Chinese Taipei) (New Zealand)	Wen Hsiu-tsuan; Belinda Cordwell	6; 4	7; 6
2	(Chinese Taipei) (New Zealand)	Ho Chiu-mei; Linda Stewart	6; 3	6; 2
3	(Chinese Taipei) (New Zealand)	Ho Chiu-mei / Hsu Mei-chu; Belinda Cordwell / Linda Stewart	2; 6	1; 6

==== Canada vs. Denmark ====
Canada
2
Decathlon Club, Santa Clara, California
July 1982
Hard (outdoor)

Denmark
1

			1	2	3
1	(Canada) (Denmark)	Carling Bassett; Dorte Ekner	6; 1	6; 2
2	(Canada) (Denmark)	Marjorie Blackwood; Anne-Mette Sorensen	6; 0	6; 2
3	(Canada) (Denmark)	Hélène Pelletier / Angela Walker; Dorte Ekner / Birgitte Hermansen	6; 4	6; 3

==== Japan vs. Indonesia ====
Japan
3
Decathlon Club, Santa Clara, California
July 1982
Hard (outdoor)

Indonesia
0

			1	2	3
1	(Japan) (Indonesia)	Kumiko Okamoto; Sri Utaminingsih	6; 3	6; 0
2	(Japan) (Indonesia)	Masaki Yanagi; Suzanna Anggarkusuma	6; 1	6; 3
3	(Japan) (Indonesia)	Etsuko Inoue / Masaki Yanagi; Suzanna Anggarkusuma / Sri Utaminingsih	6; 1	6; 3

==== Spain vs. South Korea ====
Spain
2
Decathlon Club, Santa Clara, California
July 1982
Hard (outdoor)

South Korea
1

			1	2	3
1	(Spain) (South Korea)	Vicky Baldovinos; Seol Min-kyung	6; 4	6; 4
2	(Spain) (South Korea)	Carmen Perea; Kim Soo-ok	1; 6	3; 6
3	(Spain) (South Korea)	Vicky Baldovinos / Carmen Perea; Kim Soo-ok / Shin Soon-oh	6; 4	2; 6	6; 4

==== Austria vs. France ====
Austria
0
Decathlon Club, Santa Clara, California
July 1982
Hard (outdoor)

France
3

			1	2	3
1	(Austria) (France)	Maria Geyer; Brigitte Simon	3; 6	1; 6
2	(Austria) (France)	Andrea Pesak; Corrine Vanier	2; 6	1; 6
3	(Austria) (France)	Andrea Pesak / Ingrid Sommerauer; Frédérique Thibault / Corrine Vanier	1; 6	1; 6

==== Portugal vs. Belgium ====
Portugal
0
Decathlon Club, Santa Clara, California
July 1982
Hard (outdoor)

Belgium
3

			1	2	3
1	(Portugal) (Belgium)	Deborah Fiúza; Ann Gabriel	1; 6	3; 6
2	(Portugal) (Belgium)	Leonora Peralta; Marion De Witte	2; 6	1; 6
3	(Portugal) (Belgium)	Deborah Fiúza / Leonora Peralta; Marion De Witte / Ingrid Willems	5; 7	1; 6

=== Quarterfinals ===
==== Argentina vs. Chinese Taipei ====
Argentina
3
Decathlon Club, Santa Clara, California
July 1982
Hard (outdoor)

Chinese Taipei
0

			1	2	3
1	(Argentina) (Chinese Taipei)	Adriana Villagrán Reami; Wen Hsiu-tsuan	4; 6	6; 1	6; 1
2	(Argentina) (Chinese Taipei)	Ivanna Madruga Ossès; Ho Chiu-mei	6; 1	6; 3
3	(Argentina) (Chinese Taipei)	Ivanna Madruga Ossès / Adriana Villagrán Reami; Ho Chiu-mei / Wen Hsiu-tsuan	6; 4	6; 4

==== Canada vs. Japan ====
Canada
3
Decathlon Club, Santa Clara, California
July 1982
Hard (outdoor)

Japan
0

			1	2	3
1	(Canada) (Japan)	Carling Bassett; Fumiko Furuhashi	6; 0	6; 4
2	(Canada) (Japan)	Marjorie Blackwood; Masaki Yanagi	6; 2	6; 3
3	(Canada) (Japan)	Hélène Pelletier / Angela Walker; Etsuko Inoue / Masaki Yanagi	7; 6	6; 4

==== Spain vs. France ====
Spain
1
Decathlon Club, Santa Clara, California
July 1982
Hard (outdoor)

France
2

			1	2	3
1	(Spain) (France)	Vicky Baldovinos; Brigitte Simon	3; 6	6; 3	2; 6
2	(Spain) (France)	Carmen Perea; Corrine Vanier	6; 4	6; 0
3	(Spain) (France)	Vicky Baldovinos / Carmen Perea; Frédérique Thibault / Corrine Vanier	7; 5	3; 6	5; 7

==== Belgium vs. Italy ====
Belgium
0
Decathlon Club, Santa Clara, California
July 1982
Hard (outdoor)

Italy
3

			1	2	3
1	(Belgium) (Italy)	Ann Gabriel; Barbara Rossi	4; 6	4; 6
2	(Belgium) (Italy)	Marion De Witte; Sabina Simmonds	1; 6	4; 6
3	(Belgium) (Italy)	Marion De Witte / Ingrid Willems; Patrizia Murgo / Raffaella Reggi	6; 0	4; 6	4; 6

=== Semifinals ===
==== Argentina vs. Canada ====
Argentina
1
Decathlon Club, Santa Clara, California
July 1982
Hard (outdoor)

Canada
2

			1	2	3
1	(Argentina) (Canada)	Adriana Villagrán Reami; Carling Bassett	0; 6	6; 7
2	(Argentina) (Canada)	Ivanna Madruga Ossès; Marjorie Blackwood	4; 6	7; 5	6; 2
3	(Argentina) (Canada)	Ivanna Madruga Ossès / Adriana Villagrán Reami; Marjorie Blackwood / Hélène Pelletier	4; 6	6; 7

==== France vs. Italy ====
France
2
Decathlon Club, Santa Clara, California
July 1982
Hard (outdoor)

Italy
1

			1	2	3
1	(France) (Italy)	Brigitte Simon; Barbara Rossi	3; 6	6; 4	6; 2
2	(France) (Italy)	Corrine Vanier; Sabina Simmonds	6; 1	6; 3
3	(France) (Italy)	Frédérique Thibault / Corrine Vanier; Patrizia Murgo / Sabina Simmonds	6; 1	4; 6	4; 6

=== Final ===
==== Canada vs. France ====
Canada
1
Decathlon Club, Santa Clara, California
July 1982
Hard (outdoor)

France
2

			1	2	3
1	(Canada) (France)	Carling Bassett; Brigitte Simon	5; 7	6; 3	6; 0
2	(Canada) (France)	Marjorie Blackwood; Corrine Vanier	3; 6	0; 2		retired
3	(Canada) (France)	Carling Bassett / Hélène Pelletier; Frédérique Thibault / Corrine Vanier	3; 6	4; 6
