= 1983 Federation Cup (tennis) =

International women's tennis competition

Details
- Duration: 17–24 July
- Edition: 21st

Champion
- Winning nation: Czechoslovakia

The 1983 Federation Cup was the 21st edition of the most important competition between national teams in women's tennis. The tournament was held at the Albisguetli Tennis Club in Zürich, Switzerland from 17 to 24 July. Czechoslovakia won the title, defeating West Germany in the final, in what was the first final since 1972 that didn't involve United States or Australia.

== Qualifying round ==
All ties were played at the Tennisclub Engematt in Zürich on clay courts.

Winning team	Score	Losing team
South Korea	3–0	Jamaica
Israel	3–0	Chinese Taipei
Denmark	3–0	Luxembourg
Mexico	3–0	Ireland
Norway	3–0	Portugal
China	2–1	Indonesia
Zimbabwe	2–1	Philippines

Winning nations advance to Main Draw, losing nations play in Consolation Rounds.

=== South Korea vs. Jamaica ===
South Korea
3
Tennisclub Engematt, Zürich, Switzerland
July 1983
Red clay (outdoor)

Jamaica
0

			1	2	3
1	(South Korea) (Jamaica)	Seol Min-kyung; Lisa Yap-Sam	6; 0	6; 1
2	(South Korea) (Jamaica)	Kim Soo-ok; Joni Van Ryck De Groot	6; 2	6; 0
3	(South Korea) (Jamaica)	Han Eun-sook / Shin Soon-ho; Joni Van Ryck De Groot / Lisa Yap-Sam	7; 6	6; 1

=== Israel vs. Chinese Taipei ===
Israel
3
Tennisclub Engematt, Zürich, Switzerland
July 1983
Red clay (outdoor)

Chinese Taipei
0

			1	2	3
1	(Israel) (Chinese Taipei)	Rafeket Binyamini; Hsu Mei-chu	6; 0	6; 0
2	(Israel) (Chinese Taipei)	Orly Bialistozky; Wang Dai-hwa	6; 3	6; 4
3	(Israel) (Chinese Taipei)	Rafeket Binyamini / Sagit Doron; Chen Huey-ying / Hsu Mei-chu	6; 1	6; 0

=== Denmark vs. Luxembourg ===
Denmark
3
Albisguetli Tennis Club, Zürich, Switzerland
July 1983
Red clay (outdoor)

Luxembourg
0

			1	2	3
1	(Denmark) (Luxembourg)	Therese Arildsen; Ginette Huberty	6; 3	6; 2
2	(Denmark) (Luxembourg)	Tine Scheuer-Larsen; Simone Wolter	6; 0	6; 3
3	(Denmark) (Luxembourg)	Anne Møller / Tine Scheuer-Larsen; Ginette Huberty / Simone Wolter	6; 0	6; 2

=== Mexico vs. Ireland ===
Mexico
3
Albisguetli Tennis Club, Zürich, Switzerland
July 1983
Red clay (outdoor)

Ireland
0

			1	2	3
1	(Mexico) (Republic of Ireland)	Claudia Hernández; Louise Tuff	6; 1	6; 2
2	(Mexico) (Republic of Ireland)	Heliane Steden; Siobhán Nicholson	4; 6	6; 4	8; 6
3	(Mexico) (Republic of Ireland)	Claudia Hernández / Alejandra Vallejo; Rhona Howett / Louise Tuff	6; 0	6; 3

=== Norway vs. Portugal ===
Norway
3
Albisguetli Tennis Club, Zürich, Switzerland
July 1983
Red clay (outdoor)

Portugal
0

			1	2	3
1	(Norway) (Portugal)	Astrid Sunde; Marta Varanda	6; 2	6; 2
2	(Norway) (Portugal)	Ellen Grindvold; Fátima Santiago	6; 7	6; 1	13; 11
3	(Norway) (Portugal)	Ellen Grindvold / Astrid Sunde; Maria Paula Abreu / Marta Varanda	6; 2	6; 0

=== China vs. Indonesia ===
China
2
Albisguetli Tennis Club, Zürich, Switzerland
July 1983
Red clay (outdoor)

Indonesia
1

			1	2	3
1	(China) (Indonesia)	Wang Ping; Sri Utaminingsih	6; 0	6; 1
2	(China) (Indonesia)	Yu Li-qiao; Suzanna Anggarkusuma	6; 0	7; 5
3	(China) (Indonesia)	Gong Qing-Qing / Xiang Zhen-Zhen; Sri Utaminingsih / Suzanna Anggarkusuma	4; 6	2; 6

=== Zimbabwe vs. Philippines ===
Zimbabwe
2
Albisguetli Tennis Club, Zürich, Switzerland
July 1983
Red clay (outdoor)

Philippines
1

			1	2	3
1	(Zimbabwe) (Philippines)	Lindsay Standen; Edna Olivarez	3; 6	6; 3	6; 2
2	(Zimbabwe) (Philippines)	Angela Longo; Dyan Castillejo	6; 7	6; 4	2; 6
3	(Zimbabwe) (Philippines)	Angela Longo / Lindsay Standen; Dyan Castillejo / Jackie Castillejo	6; 1	6; 7	6; 4

== Main draw ==
Participating Teams
Argentina	Australia	Austria	Belgium	Brazil	Bulgaria	Canada	China
Czechoslovakia	Denmark	France	Great Britain	Greece	Hungary	Israel	Italy
Japan	Luxembourg	Mexico	Netherlands	Norway	Peru	Romania	South Korea
Soviet Union	Spain	Sweden	Switzerland	United States	West Germany	Yugoslavia	Zimbabwe

First Round
United States	3
Q	Norway	0
Sweden	3
Belgium	0
Yugoslavia	2
Q	South Korea	1
Q	China	2
Netherlands	1
France	1
Argentina	2
Q	Zimbabwe	0
Hungary	3
Italy	2
Austria	1
Peru	0
Czechoslovakia	3
Australia	3
Soviet Union	0
Greece	1
Q	Mexico	2
Romania	3
Canada	0
Bulgaria	0
Switzerland	3
Great Britain	3
Luxembourg	0
Q	Israel	1
Brazil	2
Japan	2
Q	Denmark	1
Spain	0
West Germany	3

Second Round
United States	3
Sweden	0
Yugoslavia	3
Q	China	0
Argentina	3
Hungary	0
Italy	1
Czechoslovakia	2
Australia	3
Q	Mexico	0
Romania	1
Switzerland	2
Great Britain	3
Brazil	0
Japan	0
West Germany	3

Quarterfinals
United States	2
Yugoslavia	1
Argentina	0
Czechoslovakia	2
Australia	1
Switzerland	2
Great Britain	1
West Germany	2

Semifinals
United States	0
Czechoslovakia	2
Switzerland	0
West Germany	3

Final
Czechoslovakia	2
West Germany	1

1st Round losing teams play in Consolation Rounds

=== First round ===
==== United States vs. Norway ====
United States
3
Albisguetli Tennis Club, Zürich, Switzerland
July 1983
Red clay (outdoor)

Norway
0

			1	2	3
1	(United States) (Norway)	Candy Reynolds; Astrid Sunde	6; 4	6; 2
2	(United States) (Norway)	Andrea Jaeger; Ellen Grindvold	6; 0	6; 1
3	(United States) (Norway)	Candy Reynolds / Paula Smith; Ellen Grindvold / Astrid Sunde	6; 3	6; 2

==== Sweden vs. Belgium ====
Sweden
3
Albisguetli Tennis Club, Zürich, Switzerland
July 1983
Red clay (outdoor)

Belgium
0

			1	2	3
1	(Sweden) (Belgium)	Catarina Lindqvist; Marlene De Wouters	6; 3	6; 2
2	(Sweden) (Belgium)	Catrin Jexell; Ann Gabriel	6; 0	6; 1
3	(Sweden) (Belgium)	Catrin Jexell / Helena Olsson; Ann Gabriel / Nicole Mabille	6; 3	6; 2

==== Yugoslavia vs. South Korea ====
Yugoslavia
2
Albisguetli Tennis Club, Zürich, Switzerland
July 1983
Red clay (outdoor)

South Korea
1

			1	2	3
1	(Socialist Federal Republic of Yugoslavia) (South Korea)	Sabrina Goleš; Seol Min-kyung	2; 6	6; 7
2	(Socialist Federal Republic of Yugoslavia) (South Korea)	Renata Šašak; Kim Soo-ok	3; 6	6; 2	6; 3
3	(Socialist Federal Republic of Yugoslavia) (South Korea)	Sabrina Goleš / Renata Šašak; Kim Soo-ok / Shin Soon-ho	7; 6	6; 4

==== China vs. Netherlands ====
China
2
Albisguetli Tennis Club, Zürich, Switzerland
July 1983
Red clay (outdoor)

Netherlands
1

			1	2	3
1	(China) (Netherlands)	Yu Li-Qiao; Marianne van der Torre	6; 3	6; 0
2	(China) (Netherlands)	Wang Ping; Marcella Mesker	2; 6	7; 6	6; 2
3	(China) (Netherlands)	Wang Ping / Yu Li-Qiao; Marcella Mesker / Betty Stöve	3; 6	3; 6

==== France vs. Argentina ====
France
1
Albisguetli Tennis Club, Zürich, Switzerland
July 1983
Red clay (outdoor)

Argentina
2

			1	2	3
1	(France) (Argentina)	Corrine Vanier; Emilse Raponi-Longo	3; 6	3; 6
2	(France) (Argentina)	Catherine Tanvier; Ivanna Madruga Ossès	6; 3	6; 3
3	(France) (Argentina)	Catherine Tanvier / Corrine Vanier; Emilse Raponi-Longo / Ivanna Madruga Ossès	4; 6	3; 6

==== Zimbabwe vs. Hungary ====
Zimbabwe
0
Albisguetli Tennis Club, Zürich, Switzerland
July 1983
Red clay (outdoor)

Hungary
3

			1	2	3
1	(Zimbabwe) (Hungary)	Fiona Martin; Csilla Bartos	0; 6	0; 6
2	(Zimbabwe) (Hungary)	Angela Longo; Andrea Temesvári	0; 6	1; 6
3	(Zimbabwe) (Hungary)	Angela Longo / Lindsay Standen; Csilla Bartos / Éva Rózsavölgyi	7; 6	1; 6	2; 6

==== Italy vs. Austria ====
Italy
2
Albisguetli Tennis Club, Zürich, Switzerland
July 1983
Red clay (outdoor)

Austria
1

			1	2	3
1	(Italy) (Austria)	Raffaella Reggi; Andrea Pesak	4; 6	6; 2	6; 2
2	(Italy) (Austria)	Sabina Simmonds; Petra Huber	6; 4	1; 6	2; 6
3	(Italy) (Austria)	Sandra Cecchini / Raffaella Reggi; Petra Huber / Andrea Pesak	7; 6	2; 6	6; 2

==== Peru vs. Czechoslovakia ====
Peru
0
Albisguetli Tennis Club, Zürich, Switzerland
July 1983
Red clay (outdoor)

Czechoslovakia
3

			1	2	3
1	(Peru) (Czechoslovakia)	Pilar Vásquez; Helena Suková	3; 6	6; 1	4; 6
2	(Peru) (Czechoslovakia)	Laura Gildemeister; Hana Mandlíková	6; 7	4; 6
3	(Peru) (Czechoslovakia)	Laura Gildemeister / Pilar Vásquez; Iva Budařová / Marcela Skuherská	6; 7	3; 6

==== Australia vs. Soviet Union ====
Australia
3
Albisguetli Tennis Club, Zürich, Switzerland
July 1983
Red clay (outdoor)

Soviet Union
0

			1	2	3
1	(Australia) (Soviet Union)	Dianne Fromholtz; Larisa Savchenko	6; 1	7; 5
2	(Australia) (Soviet Union)	Wendy Turnbull; Olga Zaitseva	6; 4	4; 6	6; 2
3	(Australia) (Soviet Union)	Dianne Fromholtz / Susan Leo; Svetlana Cherneva / Larisa Savchenko	7; 5	6; 3

==== Greece vs. Mexico ====
Greece
1
Albisguetli Tennis Club, Zürich, Switzerland
July 1983
Red clay (outdoor)

Mexico
2

			1	2	3
1	(Greece) (Mexico)	Olga Tsarbopoulou; Claudia Hernández	3; 6	1; 6
2	(Greece) (Mexico)	Angeliki Kanellopoulou; Heliane Steden	6; 4	6; 2
3	(Greece) (Mexico)	Angeliki Kanellopoulou / Denise Panagopoulou; Claudia Hernández / Alejandra Vallejo	6; 7	6; 2	1; 6

==== Romania vs. Canada ====
Romania
3
Albisguetli Tennis Club, Zürich, Switzerland
July 1983
Red clay (outdoor)

Canada
0

			1	2	3
1	(Romania) (Canada)	Lucia Romanov; Angela Walker	6; 2	6; 3
2	(Romania) (Canada)	Virginia Ruzici; Carling Bassett	7; 6	6; 0
3	(Romania) (Canada)	Florența Mihai / Lucia Romanov; Carling Bassett / Jill Hetherington	6; 3	6; 4

==== Bulgaria vs. Switzerland ====
Bulgaria
0
Albisguetli Tennis Club, Zürich, Switzerland
July 1983
Red clay (outdoor)

Switzerland
3

			1	2	3
1	(Bulgaria) (Switzerland)	Adriana Velcheva; Petra Jauch-Delhees	0; 6	2; 6
2	(Bulgaria) (Switzerland)	Manuela Maleeva; Christiane Jolissaint	4; 6	6; 4	4; 6
3	(Bulgaria) (Switzerland)	Marina Kondova / Adriana Velcheva; Petra Jauch-Delhees / Christiane Jolissaint	2; 6	0; 6

==== Great Britain vs. Luxembourg ====
Great Britain
3
Albisguetli Tennis Club, Zürich, Switzerland
July 1983
Red clay (outdoor)

Luxembourg
0

			1	2	3
1	(United Kingdom) (Luxembourg)	Virginia Wade; Ginette Huberty	6; 0	6; 3
2	(United Kingdom) (Luxembourg)	Jo Durie; Simone Wolter	6; 2	6; 0
3	(United Kingdom) (Luxembourg)	Jo Durie / Anne Hobbs; Ginette Huberty / Simone Wolter	6; 0	6; 0

==== Israel vs. Brazil ====
Israel
1
Albisguetli Tennis Club, Zürich, Switzerland
July 1983
Red clay (outdoor)

Brazil
2

			1	2	3
1	(Israel) (Brazil)	Rafeket Binyamini; Cláudia Monteiro	6; 0	6; 2
2	(Israel) (Brazil)	Orly Bialistozky; Patricia Medrado	2; 6	4; 6
3	(Israel) (Brazil)	Rafeket Binyamini / Sagit Doron; Patricia Medrado / Cláudia Monteiro	6; 2	1; 6	3; 6

==== Japan vs. Denmark ====
Japan
2
Albisguetli Tennis Club, Zürich, Switzerland
July 1983
Red clay (outdoor)

Denmark
1

			1	2	3
1	(Japan) (Denmark)	Emiko Okagawa; Anne Møller	6; 0	6; 2
2	(Japan) (Denmark)	Etsuko Inoue; Tine Scheuer-Larsen	2; 6	1; 6
3	(Japan) (Denmark)	Emiko Okagawa / Masako Yanagi; Anne Møller / Tine Scheuer-Larsen	6; 1	6; 1

==== Spain vs. West Germany ====
Spain
0
Albisguetli Tennis Club, Zürich, Switzerland
July 1983
Red clay (outdoor)

West Germany
3

			1	2	3
1	(Spain) (West Germany)	Ana Almansa; Claudia Kohde-Kilsch	1; 6	2; 6
2	(Spain) (West Germany)	Carmen Perea; Bettina Bunge	5; 7	3; 6
3	(Spain) (West Germany)	Ana Almansa / Elena Guerra; Claudia Kohde-Kilsch / Eva Pfaff	2; 6	1; 6

=== Second round ===
==== United States vs. Sweden ====
United States
3
Albisguetli Tennis Club, Zürich, Switzerland
July 1983
Red clay (outdoor)

Sweden
0

			1	2	3
1	(United States) (Sweden)	Candy Reynolds; Catarina Lindqvist	6; 3	3; 6	6; 1
2	(United States) (Sweden)	Andrea Jaeger; Catrin Jexell	6; 0	6; 2
3	(United States) (Sweden)	Candy Reynolds / Paula Smith; Catrin Jexell / Helena Olsson	6; 1	6; 2

==== Yugoslavia vs. China ====
Yugoslavia
2
Albisguetli Tennis Club, Zürich, Switzerland
July 1983
Red clay (outdoor)

China
1

			1	2	3
1	(Socialist Federal Republic of Yugoslavia) (China)	Sabrina Goleš; Yu Li-Qiao	7; 6	6; 3
2	(Socialist Federal Republic of Yugoslavia) (China)	Renata Šašak; Wang Ping	6; 4	7; 6
3	(Socialist Federal Republic of Yugoslavia) (China)	Sabrina Goleš / Renata Šašak; Yu Li-Qiao / Wang Ping	6; 0	7; 6

==== Argentina vs. Hungary ====
Argentina
3
Albisguetli Tennis Club, Zürich, Switzerland
July 1983
Red clay (outdoor)

Hungary
0

			1	2	3
1	(Argentina) (Hungary)	Emilse Raponi-Longo; Csilla Bartos	6; 4	7; 5
2	(Argentina) (Hungary)	Ivanna Madruga Ossès; Andrea Temesvári	6; 4	7; 5
3	(Argentina) (Hungary)	Liliana Giussani / Emilse Raponi-Longo; Csilla Bartos / Éva Rózsavölgyi	6; 3	2; 6	6; 3

==== Italy vs. Czechoslovakia ====
Italy
1
Albisguetli Tennis Club, Zürich, Switzerland
July 1983
Red clay (outdoor)

Czechoslovakia
2

			1	2	3
1	(Italy) (Czechoslovakia)	Raffaella Reggi; Helena Suková	6; 4	6; 1
2	(Italy) (Czechoslovakia)	Sabina Simmonds; Hana Mandlíková	3; 6	3; 6
3	(Italy) (Czechoslovakia)	Sandra Cecchini / Raffaella Reggi; Hana Mandlíková / Helena Suková	1; 6	4; 6

==== Australia vs. Mexico ====
Australia
3
Albisguetli Tennis Club, Zürich, Switzerland
July 1983
Red clay (outdoor)

Mexico
0

			1	2	3
1	(Australia) (Mexico)	Dianne Fromholtz; Claudia Hernández	6; 4	6; 1
2	(Australia) (Mexico)	Wendy Turnbull; Heliane Steden	6; 7	7; 5	6; 4
3	(Australia) (Mexico)	Dianne Fromholtz / Susan Leo; Claudia Hernández / Alejandra Vallejo	6; 3	6; 0

==== Romania vs. Switzerland ====
Romania
1
Albisguetli Tennis Club, Zürich, Switzerland
July 1983
Red clay (outdoor)

Switzerland
2

			1	2	3
1	(Romania) (Switzerland)	Lucia Romanov; Petra Jauch-Delhees	1; 6	4; 6
2	(Romania) (Switzerland)	Virginia Ruzici; Christiane Jolissaint	7; 6	6; 4
3	(Romania) (Switzerland)	Lucia Romanov / Virginia Ruzici; Petra Jauch-Delhees / Christiane Jolissaint	6; 2	3; 6	5; 7

==== Great Britain vs. Brazil ====
Great Britain
3
Albisguetli Tennis Club, Zürich, Switzerland
July 1983
Red clay (outdoor)

Brazil
0

			1	2	3
1	(United Kingdom) (Brazil)	Virginia Wade; Cláudia Monteiro	6; 1	2; 6	6; 3
2	(United Kingdom) (Brazil)	Jo Durie; Patricia Medrado	6; 4	6; 4
3	(United Kingdom) (Brazil)	Jo Durie / Anne Hobbs; Patricia Medrado / Cláudia Monteiro	6; 3	6; 2

==== Japan vs. West Germany ====
Japan
0
Albisguetli Tennis Club, Zürich, Switzerland
July 1983
Red clay (outdoor)

West Germany
3

			1	2	3
1	(Japan) (West Germany)	Masako Yanagi; Eva Pfaff	3; 6	3; 6
2	(Japan) (West Germany)	Etsuko Inoue; Bettina Bunge	1; 6	0; 6
3	(Japan) (West Germany)	Kumiko Okamoto / Masako Yanagi; Petra Keppeler / Eva Pfaff	6; 7	5; 7

=== Quarterfinals ===
==== United States vs. Yugoslavia ====
United States
2
Albisguetli Tennis Club, Zürich, Switzerland
July 1983
Red clay (outdoor)

Yugoslavia
1

			1	2	3
1	(United States) (Socialist Federal Republic of Yugoslavia)	Candy Reynolds; Sabrina Goleš	5; 7	6; 3	10; 12
2	(United States) (Socialist Federal Republic of Yugoslavia)	Andrea Jaeger; Renata Šašak	6; 0	6; 1
3	(United States) (Socialist Federal Republic of Yugoslavia)	Candy Reynolds / Paula Smith; Sabrina Goleš / Renata Šašak	6; 3	6; 4

==== Argentina vs. Czechoslovakia ====
Argentina
0
Albisguetli Tennis Club, Zürich, Switzerland
July 1983
Red clay (outdoor)

Czechoslovakia
2

			1	2	3
1	(Argentina) (Czechoslovakia)	Emilse Raponi-Longo; Helena Suková	6; 4	1; 6	2; 6
2	(Argentina) (Czechoslovakia)	Ivanna Madruga Ossès; Hana Mandlíková	4; 6	3; 6
3	(Argentina) (Czechoslovakia)					not played

==== Australia vs. Switzerland ====
Australia
1
Albisguetli Tennis Club, Zürich, Switzerland
July 1983
Red clay (outdoor)

Switzerland
2

			1	2	3
1	(Australia) (Switzerland)	Dianne Fromholtz; Petra Jauch-Delhees	1; 6	4; 6
2	(Australia) (Switzerland)	Wendy Turnbull; Christiane Jolissaint	4; 6	7; 6	1; 6
3	(Australia) (Switzerland)	Dianne Fromholtz / Susan Leo; Petra Jauch-Delhees / Christiane Jolissaint	6; 1	7; 6

==== Great Britain vs. West Germany ====
Great Britain
1
Albisguetli Tennis Club, Zürich, Switzerland
July 1983
Red clay (outdoor)

West Germany
2

			1	2	3
1	(United Kingdom) (West Germany)	Virginia Wade; Claudia Kohde-Kilsch	3; 6	0; 6
2	(United Kingdom) (West Germany)	Jo Durie; Bettina Bunge	3; 6	4; 6
3	(United Kingdom) (West Germany)	Jo Durie / Anne Hobbs; Bettina Bunge / Eva Pfaff	3; 6	6; 4	10; 8

=== Semifinals ===
==== United States vs. Czechoslovakia ====
United States
0
Albisguetli Tennis Club, Zürich, Switzerland
July 1983
Red clay (outdoor)

Czechoslovakia
2

			1	2	3
1	(United States) (Czechoslovakia)	Candy Reynolds; Helena Suková	7; 6	2; 6	2; 6
2	(United States) (Czechoslovakia)	Andrea Jaeger; Hana Mandlíková	6; 7	7; 5	3; 6
3	(United States) (Czechoslovakia)					not played

==== Switzerland vs. West Germany ====
Switzerland
0
Albisguetli Tennis Club, Zürich, Switzerland
July 1983
Red clay (outdoor)

West Germany
3

			1	2	3
1	(Switzerland) (West Germany)	Petra Jauch-Delhees; Claudia Kohde-Kilsch	4; 6	3; 6
2	(Switzerland) (West Germany)	Christiane Jolissaint; Bettina Bunge	0; 6	3; 6
3	(Switzerland) (West Germany)	Petra Jauch-Delhees / Christiane Jolissaint; Petra Keppeler / Eva Pfaff	3; 6	4; 6

=== Final ===
==== Czechoslovakia vs. West Germany ====
Czechoslovakia
2
Albisguetli Tennis Club, Zürich, Switzerland
24 July 1983
Red clay (outdoor)

West Germany
1

			1	2	3
1	(Czechoslovakia) (West Germany)	Helena Suková; Claudia Kohde-Kilsch	6; 4	2; 6	6; 2
2	(Czechoslovakia) (West Germany)	Hana Mandlíková; Bettina Bunge	6; 2	3; 0		retired
3	(Czechoslovakia) (West Germany)	Iva Budařová / Marcela Skuherská; Claudia Kohde-Kilsch / Eva Pfaff	6; 3	2; 6	1; 6

1983 Federation Cup Champions
(Czechoslovakia)
Czechoslovakia
Second title

== Consolation Rounds ==
=== Draw ===
Consolation First Round
Jamaica	2
Indonesia	0
Bulgaria	3
Zimbabwe	0
Luxembourg	1
Chinese Taipei	2
Norway	1
Belgium	2
Greece	3
Philippines	0
Ireland	0
South Korea	3

Consolation Second Round
Denmark	1
Israel	2
Netherlands	3
Jamaica	0
Soviet Union	2
Bulgaria	1
Canada	3
Chinese Taipei	0
Belgium	1
Austria	2
Greece	0
Peru	3
South Korea	2
France	1
Spain	3
Portugal	0

Consolation Quarterfinals
Israel	1
Netherlands	2
Soviet Union	2
Canada	1
Austria	0
Peru	2
South Korea	2
Spain	1

Consolation Semifinals
Netherlands	1
Soviet Union	2
Peru	2
South Korea	1

Consolation Final
Soviet Union	2
Peru	1

=== First round ===
==== Jamaica vs. Indonesia ====
Jamaica
2
Albisguetli Tennis Club, Zürich, Switzerland
July 1983
Red clay (outdoor)

Indonesia
0

			1	2	3
1	(Jamaica) (Indonesia)	Lisa Yap-Sam; Suzanna Anggarkusuma	6; 4	2; 6	6; 4
2	(Jamaica) (Indonesia)	Joni Van Ryck De Groot; Sri Utaminingsih	7; 6	6; 1
3	(Jamaica) (Indonesia)

==== Bulgaria vs. Zimbabwe ====
Bulgaria
3
Albisguetli Tennis Club, Zürich, Switzerland
July 1983
Red clay (outdoor)

Zimbabwe
0

			1	2	3
1	(Bulgaria) (Zimbabwe)	Adriana Velcheva; Lindsay Standen	6; 1	6; 3
2	(Bulgaria) (Zimbabwe)	Manuela Maleeva; Angela Longo	6; 1	6; 0
3	(Bulgaria) (Zimbabwe)	Marina Kondova / Manuela Maleeva; Angela Longo / Lindsay Standen	6; 4	6; 2

==== Luxembourg vs. Chinese Taipei ====
Luxembourg
1
Albisguetli Tennis Club, Zürich, Switzerland
July 1983
Red clay (outdoor)

Chinese Taipei
2

			1	2	3
1	(Luxembourg) (Chinese Taipei)	Rita Krombach; Hsu Mei-chu	1; 6	2; 6
2	(Luxembourg) (Chinese Taipei)	Ginette Huberty; Wang Dai-hwa	6; 7	7; 6	6; 2
3	(Luxembourg) (Chinese Taipei)	Ginette Huberty / Rita Krombach; Chen Huey-ying / Hsu Mei-chu	5; 7	2; 6

==== Norway vs. Belgium ====
Norway
1
Albisguetli Tennis Club, Zürich, Switzerland
July 1983
Red clay (outdoor)

Belgium
2

			1	2	3
1	(Norway) (Belgium)	Frøydis Forberg; Nicole Mabille	1; 6	0; 6
2	(Norway) (Belgium)	Astrid Sunde; Ann Gabriel	6; 7	1; 6
3	(Norway) (Belgium)	Ellen Grindvold / Astrid Sunde; Marlene De Wouters / Nicole Mabille	6; 0	6; 4

==== Greece vs. Philippines ====
Greece
0
Albisguetli Tennis Club, Zürich, Switzerland
July 1983
Red clay (outdoor)

Philippines
3

			1	2	3
1	(Greece) (Philippines)	Denise Panagopoulou; Edna Olivarez	6; 1	6; 1
2	(Greece) (Philippines)	Angeliki Kanellopoulou; Dyan Castillejo	6; 2	6; 0
3	(Greece) (Philippines)	Xenia Anastasiados / Denise Panagopoulou; Dyan Castillejo / Jackie Castillejo	6; 0	6; 4

==== Ireland vs. South Korea ====
Ireland
0
Albisguetli Tennis Club, Zürich, Switzerland
July 1983
Red clay (outdoor)

South Korea
3

			1	2	3
1	(Republic of Ireland) (South Korea)	Rhona Howett; Seol Min-kyung	2; 6	1; 6
2	(Republic of Ireland) (South Korea)	Siobhán Nicholson; Shin Soon-ho	3; 6	6; 7
3	(Republic of Ireland) (South Korea)	Rhona Howett / Louise Tuff; Han Eun-sook / Kim Soo-ok	3; 6	2; 6

=== Second round ===
==== Denmark vs. Israel ====
Denmark
1
Albisguetli Tennis Club, Zürich, Switzerland
July 1983
Red clay (outdoor)

Israel
2

			1	2	3
1	(Denmark) (Israel)	Therese Arildsen; Rafeket Binyamini	1; 6	0; 6
2	(Denmark) (Israel)	Tine Scheuer-Larsen; Orly Bialistozky	6; 2	6; 0
3	(Denmark) (Israel)	Anne Møller / Tine Scheuer-Larsen; Orly Bialistozky / Rafeket Binyamini	5; 7	5; 7

==== Netherlands vs. Jamaica ====
Netherlands
3
Albisguetli Tennis Club, Zürich, Switzerland
July 1983
Red clay (outdoor)

Jamaica
0

			1	2	3
1	(Netherlands) (Jamaica)	Judith Warringa; Lisa Yap-Sam	6; 2	6; 2
2	(Netherlands) (Jamaica)	Marcella Mesker; Joni Van Ryck De Groot	7; 6	6; 0
3	(Netherlands) (Jamaica)	Marcella Mesker / Betty Stöve; Joni Van Ryck De Groot / Lisa Yap-Sam	6; 0	6; 0

==== Soviet Union vs. Bulgaria ====
Soviet Union
2
Tennisclub Engematt, Zürich, Switzerland
July 1983
Red clay (outdoor)

Bulgaria
1

			1	2	3
1	(Soviet Union) (Bulgaria)	Larisa Savchenko; Adriana Velcheva	6; 0	6; 2
2	(Soviet Union) (Bulgaria)	Olga Zaitseva; Manuela Maleeva	0; 6	3; 6
3	(Soviet Union) (Bulgaria)	Svetlana Cherneva / Larisa Savchenko; Manuela Maleeva / Adriana Velcheva	6; 4	6; 3

==== Canada vs. Chinese Taipei ====
Canada
3
Albisguetli Tennis Club, Zürich, Switzerland
July 1983
Red clay (outdoor)

Chinese Taipei
0

			1	2	3
1	(Canada) (Chinese Taipei)	Angela Walker; Hsu Mei-chu	6; 2	6; 2
2	(Canada) (Chinese Taipei)	Carling Bassett; Wang Dai-hwa	6; 0	6; 0
3	(Canada) (Chinese Taipei)	Jill Hetherington / Angela Walker; Hsu Mei-chu / Wang Dai-hwa	6; 3	6; 1

==== Belgium vs. Austria ====
Belgium
1
Albisguetli Tennis Club, Zürich, Switzerland
July 1983
Red clay (outdoor)

Austria
2

			1	2	3
1	(Belgium) (Austria)	Marlene De Wouters; Judith Wiesner	0; 6	1; 6
2	(Belgium) (Austria)	Ann Gabriel; Andrea Pesak	6; 3	6; 2
3	(Belgium) (Austria)	Ann Gabriel / Nicole Mabille; Andrea Pesak / Judith Wiesner	3; 6	3; 6

==== Greece vs. Peru ====
Greece
0
Albisguetli Tennis Club, Zürich, Switzerland
July 1983
Red clay (outdoor)

Peru
3

			1	2	3
1	(Greece) (Peru)	Olga Tsarbopoulou; Pilar Vásquez	1; 6	0; 6
2	(Greece) (Peru)	Angeliki Kanellopoulou; Laura Gildemeister	6; 7	1; 6
3	(Greece) (Peru)	Xenia Anastasiados / Denise Panagopoulou; Laura Gildemeister / Pilar Vásquez	4; 6	1; 6

==== South Korea vs. France ====
South Korea
2
Albisguetli Tennis Club, Zürich, Switzerland
July 1983
Red clay (outdoor)

France
1

			1	2	3
1	(South Korea) (France)	Seol Min-kyung; Catherine Suire	3; 6	6; 1	6; 3
2	(South Korea) (France)	Shin Soon-ho; Corrine Vanier	7; 6	6; 2
3	(South Korea) (France)	Han Eun-sook / Kim Soo-ok; Catherine Suire / Catherine Tanvier	4; 6	6; 4	2; 6

==== Spain vs. Portugal ====
Spain
3
Albisguetli Tennis Club, Zürich, Switzerland
July 1983
Red clay (outdoor)

Portugal
0

			1	2	3
1	(Spain) (Portugal)	Ana Almansa; Marta Varanda	6; 1	6; 2
2	(Spain) (Portugal)	Carmen Perea; Fátima Santiago	6; 1	6; 1
3	(Spain) (Portugal)	Ana Almansa / Elena Guerra; Fátima Santiago / Marta Varanda	6; 2	6; 4

=== Quarterfinals ===
==== Israel vs. Netherlands ====
Israel
1
Albisguetli Tennis Club, Zürich, Switzerland
July 1983
Red clay (outdoor)

Netherlands
2

			1	2	3
1	(Israel) (Netherlands)	Rafeket Binyamini; Judith Warringa	1; 6	4; 6
2	(Israel) (Netherlands)	Orly Bialistozky; Marcella Mesker	6; 3	4; 6	6; 0
3	(Israel) (Netherlands)	Orly Bialistozky / Rafeket Binyamini; Marcella Mesker / Betty Stöve	2; 6	6; 3	3; 6

==== Soviet Union vs. Canada ====
Soviet Union
2
Albisguetli Tennis Club, Zürich, Switzerland
July 1983
Red clay (outdoor)

Canada
1

			1	2	3
1	(Soviet Union) (Canada)	Larisa Savchenko; Angela Walker	6; 1	6; 1
2	(Soviet Union) (Canada)	Svetlana Cherneva; Carling Bassett	4; 6	2; 6
3	(Soviet Union) (Canada)	Svetlana Cherneva / Larisa Savchenko; Carling Bassett / Jill Hetherington	6; 1	6; 1

==== Austria vs. Peru ====
Austria
0
Albisguetli Tennis Club, Zürich, Switzerland
July 1983
Red clay (outdoor)

Peru
2

			1	2	3
1	(Austria) (Peru)	Judith Wiesner; Pilar Vásquez	0; 6	4; 6
2	(Austria) (Peru)	Andrea Pesak; Laura Gildemeister	5; 7	4; 6
3	(Austria) (Peru)

==== South Korea vs. Spain ====
South Korea
2
Albisguetli Tennis Club, Zürich, Switzerland
July 1983
Red clay (outdoor)

Spain
1

			1	2	3
1	(South Korea) (Spain)	Seol Min-kyung; Ana Almansa	3; 6	7; 6	6; 1
2	(South Korea) (Spain)	Shin Soon-ho; Carmen Perea	6; 7	6; 4	3; 6
3	(South Korea) (Spain)	Han Eun-sook / Shin Soon-ho; Ana Almansa / Carmen Perea	6; 4	5; 7	6; 0

=== Semifinals ===
==== Netherlands vs. Soviet Union ====
Netherlands
1
Albisguetli Tennis Club, Zürich, Switzerland
July 1983
Red clay (outdoor)

Soviet Union
2

			1	2	3
1	(Netherlands) (Soviet Union)	Judith Warringa; Olga Zaitseva	3; 6	4; 6
2	(Netherlands) (Soviet Union)	Marcella Mesker; Svetlana Cherneva	6; 7	6; 2	6; 4
3	(Netherlands) (Soviet Union)	Marcella Mesker / Betty Stöve; Svetlana Cherneva / Olga Zaitseva	6; 1	5; 7	6; 2

==== Peru vs. South Korea ====
Peru
2
Albisguetli Tennis Club, Zürich, Switzerland
July 1983
Red clay (outdoor)

South Korea
1

			1	2	3
1	(Peru) (South Korea)	Pilar Vásquez; Seol Min-kyung	6; 4	6; 3
2	(Peru) (South Korea)	Laura Gildemeister; Kim Soo-ok	6; 3	6; 2
3	(Peru) (South Korea)	Laura Gildemeister / Pilar Vásquez; Han Eun-sook / Shin Soon-ho	3; 6	5; 7

=== Final ===
==== Soviet Union vs. Peru ====
Soviet Union
2
Albisguetli Tennis Club, Zürich, Switzerland
July 1983
Red clay (outdoor)

Peru
1

			1	2	3
1	(Soviet Union) (Peru)	Olga Zaitseva; Pilar Vásquez	6; 3	6; 2
2	(Soviet Union) (Peru)	Svetlana Cherneva; Laura Gildemeister	4; 6	3; 6
3	(Soviet Union) (Peru)	Svetlana Cherneva / Olga Zaitseva; Laura Gildemeister / Pilar Vásquez	6; 4	6; 4
