= Olga Zaitseva (tennis) =

- Country (sports): (Soviet Union) USSR
- Born: 12 March 1962 (age 63)

Singles
- Career record: 1–6

Doubles
- Career record: 8–2

Olga Vladimirovna Urban (née Zaitseva; Russian: Ольга Владимировна Зайцева; born 12 March 1962) is a former competitor for the Soviet Union at the 1979, 1980, 1981 and 1983 editions of the Federation Cup. Despite posting doubles victories over top professionals such as Betty Stöve, Hana Mandlíková and Renáta Tomanová, Zaitseva did not compete at any point on the women's professional tennis circuit or at any of the Grand Slams and thus never attained a world ranking. (Note: Olga Zaitseva at the Billie Jean King Cup (archived))

== Career finals ==
=== Doubles (3-0) ===
Result	No.	Year	Tournament	Location	Partner	Opponents	Score
Win	1.	1979	USSR Tennis National Championship	Saint Petersburg, Russian SFSR	(Soviet Union) Olga Morozova	(Soviet Union) Natalya Borodina (Soviet Union) Yelena Granaturova	6–7, 7–5, 6–2
Win	2.	1980	USSR Tennis National Championship	Yerevan, Russian SFSR	(Soviet Union) Olga Morozova	(Soviet Union) Galina Baksheeva (Soviet Union) Elena Eliseenko	6–1, 6–1
Win	3.	1981	USSR Tennis National Championship	Moscow, Russian SFSR	(Soviet Union) Svetlana Parkhomenko	(Soviet Union) Natasha Chmyreva (Soviet Union) Marina Kroschina	6–1, 6–1
