= Judith Warringa =

Dutch tennis player

Judith Warringa (born 22 March 1965) is a Dutch former professional tennis player.

She has career-high WTA rankings of 151 in singles, achieved on 5 February 1990, and 365 in doubles, reached on 5 January 1987.

Playing for Netherlands at the Fed Cup, Warringa has a win–loss record of 3–0.

== ITF finals ==
=== Singles: 6 (1–5) ===
Result	No.	Date	Tournament	Surface	Opponent	Score
Loss	1.	4 December 1983	Tipton, United Kingdom	Carpet	(United States) Carol Daniels	5–7, 4–6
Loss	2.	5 August 1984	Sezze, Italy	Clay	(Switzerland) Csilla Bartos-Cserepy	5–7, 3–6
Loss	3.	9 October 1988	Makarska Yugoslavia	Clay	(Czechoslovakia) Andrea Strnadová	2–6, 0–1 ret.
Win	1.	5 November 1989	Meknes, Morocco	Clay	(Czechoslovakia) Zuzana Witzová	6–3, 6–4
Loss	4.	12 November 1989	Fez, Morocco	Clay	(West Germany) Barbara Rittner	7–6, 3–6, 7–9
Loss	5.	21 January 1990	Jakarta, Indonesia	Hard	(Indonesia) Yayuk Basuki	2–6, 4–6

=== Doubles: 3 (1–2) ===
Result	No.	Date	Tournament	Surface	Partner	Opponents	Score
Win	1.	4 December 1983	Tipton, United Kingdom	Carpet	(Romania) Florența Mihai	(United Kingdom) Suzi Mair (Belgium) Kathleen Schuurmans	7–5, 7–6
Loss	1.	11 November 1994	Hiroshima, Japan	Hard	(United States) Cheryl Jones	(Japan) Fumiko Furuhashi (Japan) Kazuko Ito	6–2, 2–6, 5–7
Loss	2.	2 October 1988	Šibenik, Yugoslavia	Clay	(Czechoslovakia) Denisa Claassen	(Czechoslovakia) Alice Noháčová (Czechoslovakia) Andrea Strnadová	6–7, 3–6
