= Csilla Bartos-Cserepy =

Hungarian-Swiss tennis player

- Country (sports): Hungary; Switzerland
- Born: 29 March 1966 (age 60) Cairo, Egypt
- Height: 1.80 m (5 ft 11 in)
- Turned pro: 1981
- Retired: 1991
- Plays: Right-handed (two-handed backhand)
- Prize money: $121,366

Singles
- Career record: 138–108
- Career titles: 0
- Highest ranking: No. 60 (4 July 1983)

Grand Slam singles results
- Australian Open: 3R (1987)
- French Open: 1R (1987), 1991)
- Wimbledon: 2R (1987)
- US Open: 2R (1986, 1990)

Doubles
- Career record: 28–37
- Career titles: 0
- Highest ranking: No. 80 (11 May 1987)

Grand Slam doubles results
- Australian Open: 1R (1987)
- French Open: 1R (1987)
- Wimbledon: 2R (1987)
- US Open: 2R (1986)

Csilla Bartos-Cserepy (née Bartos; born 29 March 1966) is a retired professional tennis who represented Hungary and Switzerland.

== Early life and tennis career ==
Csilla Bartos was born in Cairo, Egypt on 29 March 1966, daughter of Hungarian parents Gyozo Bartos, a businessman, and Klára Killermann, an Olympic breaststroke swimmer. She lived in Nigeria for nine years during her childhood.

During her tennis career, Bartos-Cserepy reached two WTA singles finals. In 1986, she was runner-up to Nathalie Herreman in Perugia, losing the final is two sets, and in 1990, Sandra Cecchini defeated her in the final of the Tier V tournament in Båstad, Sweden, also in straight sets. In Perugia, she also reached the final of the doubles event, partnering Amy Holton, but lost to the Dutch team of Carin Bakkum and Nicole Muns-Jagerman.

Bartos-Cserepy's best singles performance at Grand Slam level was reaching the third round of the 1987 Australian Open where she lost in three sets to sixth-seeded Manuela Maleeva.

Bartos-Cserepy played in four editions of Federation Cup tennis for Hungary between 1981 and 1986. In 1990, she participated for Switzerland. She played a total of 17 ties and compiled a record of 17 wins and 13 losses.

In 1985, she married Danny Cserepy and played under the name Csilla Bartos-Cserepy or Csilla Cserepy. She is the aunt of Princess Viktória de Bourbon de Parme.

== WTA Tour finals ==
=== Singles (0-2) ===
| Result | W–L | Date | Tournament | Surface | Opponent | Score |
|---|---|---|---|---|---|---|
| Loss | 0–1 | Jul 1986 | Perugia, Italy | Clay | (France) Nathalie Herreman | 2–6, 4–6 |
| Loss | 0–2 | Jul 1990 | Båstad, Sweden | Clay | (Italy) Sandra Cecchini | 1–6, 2–6 |

=== Doubles (0-2) ===
| Result | W–L | Date | Tournament | Surface | Partner | Opponents | Score |
|---|---|---|---|---|---|---|---|
| Loss | 0–1 | Dec 1985 | São Paulo, Brazil | Clay | (Brazil) Niege Dias | (Argentina) Mercedes Paz (Argentina) Gabriela Sabatini | 5–7, 4–6 |
| Loss | 0–2 | Jul 1986 | Perugia, Italy | Clay | (United States) Amy Holton | (Netherlands) Carin Bakkum (Netherlands) Nicole Muns-Jagerman | 4–6, 4–6 |

== ITF finals ==
=== Singles (5–2) ===
$25,000 tournaments
$10,000 tournaments

| Result | No. | Date | Tournament | Surface | Opponent | Score |
|---|---|---|---|---|---|---|
| Win | 1. | 20 May 1984 | Bath, United Kingdom | Clay | (Brazil) Niege Dias | 6–4, 4–6, 6–3 |
| Win | 2. | 5 August 1984 | Sezze, Italy | Clay | (Netherlands) Judith Warringa | 7–5, 6–3 |
| Win | 3. | 9 September 1984 | Rottweil, West Germany | Clay | (West Germany) Regina Wieser | 6–3, 4–6, 4–6 |
| Win | 4. | 3 November 1986 | London, United Kingdom | Grass | (Sweden) Cecilia Dahlman | 6–0, 3–6, 7–5 |
| Loss | 5. | 11 September 1988 | Agliana, Italy | Clay | (Hungary) Andrea Noszály | 2–6, 3–6 |
| Loss | 6. | 3 September 1989 | Ciampino, Italy | Hard | (Italy) Francesca Romano | 6–1, 5–7, 1–6 |
| Win | 7. | 2 July 1990 | Brindisi, Italy | Hard | (France) Mary Pierce | 2–6, 6–2, 6–2 |

=== Doubles (1-1) ===
| Result | No. | Date | Tournament | Surface | Partner | Opponents | Score |
|---|---|---|---|---|---|---|---|
| Win | 1. | 2 January 1984 | Chicago, United States | Hard | (Netherlands) Marianne van der Torre | (Soviet Union) Larisa Neiland (Soviet Union) Svetlana Parkhomenko | w/o |
| Loss | 2. | 20 May 1984 | Bath, United Kingdom | Clay | (Switzerland) Monica Weber | (United States) Kris Kinney (United States) Donna Rubin | w/o |
