= Anne-Mette Sørensen =

Danish tennis player

- Country (sports): Denmark
- Born: 7 July 1947 (age 77)

Singles

Grand Slam singles results
- Wimbledon: Q1 (1974)

Doubles

Grand Slam doubles results
- Wimbledon: 1R (1974)

Anne-Mette Sørensen (born 7 July 1947) is a Danish former professional tennis player.

Sørensen, who comes from the island of Funen, won three outdoor and five indoor Danish national singles championships during her career. She was named Funen's sportsperson of the year in 1975.

Between 1972 and 1982 she played in 31 Federation Cup rubbers for the Denmark Federation Cup team. In 1976 she helped Denmark win ties over Spain and Uruguay, which put Denmark in the quarter-finals for the first time. She won her quarter-final singles rubber over Tine Zwaan of the Netherlands, but the Dutch team prevailed 2–1.
