= Rafeket Binyamini =

Israeli tennis player

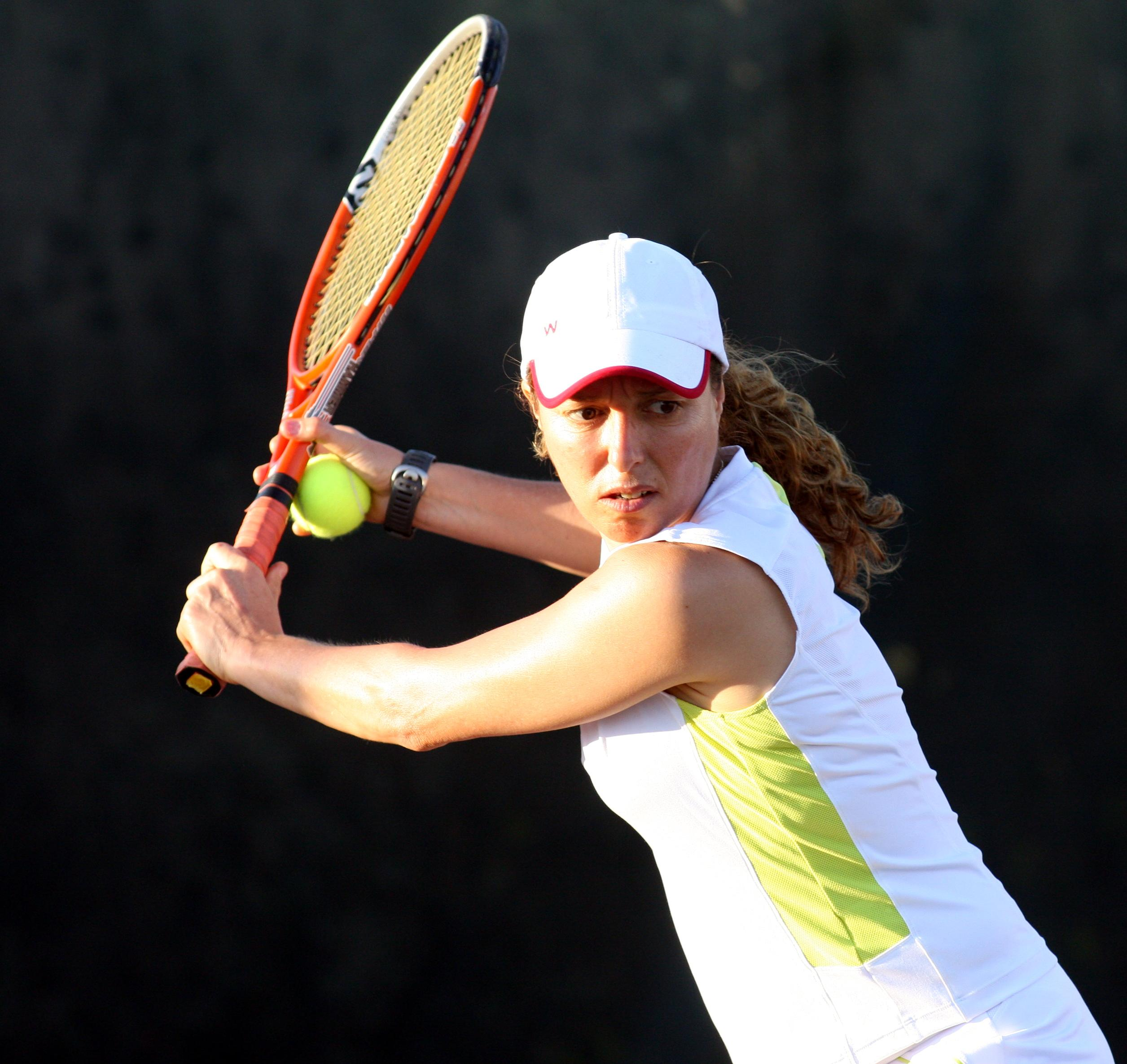
- Native name: רפקת בנימיני
- Country (sports): Israel
- Born: 15 September 1964 (age 61) Tel Aviv, Israel
- Height: 168 cm (5 ft 6 in)
- Plays: Left-handed

Singles
- Career record: 6–5 (Federation Cup)

Doubles
- Career record: 4–5 (Federation Cup)
Medal record
Maccabiah Games
Silver medal – second place	1981 Israel	Women's doubles

Rafeket Binyamini (Hebrew: רפקת בנימיני; born 15 September 1964) is an Israeli former professional tennis player. Now working as a coach, she is a manager for the Israel Tennis Center.

Born in Tel Aviv, Binyamini was a national champion in both the 16s and 18s age groups. She won Israel's senior championships in 1981 and made her debut that year for the Federation Cup team. In a four-year Federation Cup career she featured in 11 ties and won six singles matches, which included beating Brazil's Cláudia Monteiro.

Binyamini, a Maccabiah Games medalist for Israel, played U.S. collegiate tennis in San Diego for United States International University. She achieved All-American honours and a best collegiate ranking of 15.

== See also ==
- List of Israel Fed Cup team representatives
