= Angela Walker (tennis) =

Canadian tennis player

- Country (sports): Canada
- Born: December 18, 1960 (age 64)

Doubles

Grand Slam doubles results
- French Open: 1R (1983)
- US Open: 1R (1981)

Angela Walker (born December 18, 1960) is a Canadian former professional tennis player.

Walker, who grew up in Sarnia, Ontario, competed on the professional tour in the early 1980s. As a singles player her best performance on the WTA Tour was a quarter-final appearance at Japan's Borden Classic in 1982. She played in the women's doubles main draws of the 1981 US Open and 1983 French Open.

From 1981 to 1983, Walker played six Federation Cup ties for Canada. She was unbeaten in her three doubles rubbers and won one of four singles matches.

== See also ==
- List of Canada Fed Cup team representatives
