= Fumiko Furuhashi =

Japanese tennis player (born 1959)

- Country (sports): Japan
- Born: 22 April 1959 (age 67)
- Plays: Right-handed

Singles
- Career record: 1–5 (WTA Tour)
Medal record
Summer Universiade
Silver medal – second place	1981 Bucharest	Women's doubles

Fumiko Furuhashi (Japanese: 古橋 富美子; born 22 April 1959) is a Japanese former professional tennis player.

Furuhashi, the 1980 All-Japan singles champion, represented her country in a total of five Federation Cup ties. She competed for Japan at the 1981 Summer Universiade and won a silver medal in the women's doubles event.

== See also ==
- List of Japan Fed Cup team representatives
