= Ho Chiu-mei =

Taiwanese tennis player

- Country (sports): Chinese Taipei
- Born: 10 September 1962 (age 63)

Singles
- Highest ranking: No. 751 (21 Sep 1992)

Doubles
- Highest ranking: No. 661 (8 Mar 1993)
Medal record
Women's tennis
Representing Chinese Taipei
Asian Games
Bronze medal – third place	1994 Hiroshima	Women's team
Summer Deaflympics
Gold medal – first place	2017 Samsun	Women's Doubles
Gold medal – first place	2021 Caxias do Sul	Women's Doubles
Silver medal – second place	2009 Taipei	Women's Doubles
Silver medal – second place	2013 Sofia	Women's Singles
Silver medal – second place	2013 Sofia	Women's Doubles
Bronze medal – third place	2009 Taipei	Women's Singles
Bronze medal – third place	2017 Samsun	Women's Singles
Bronze medal – third place	2021 Caxias do Sul	Women's Singles

Ho Chiu-mei (Chinese: 何秋美; born 10 September 1962) is a Taiwanese former professional tennis player.

Ho comes from the city of Chiayi in southwestern Taiwan and is the youngest of five siblings. She took up tennis in sixth grade, encouraged by her physical education teacher who thought her build would suit a tennis player.

Debuting in 1978, Ho played on and off for the Chinese Taipei Federation Cup team over 16-years, featuring in a total of 24 ties, for four singles and six doubles wins. She also represented Chinese Taipei at the 1994 Asian Games and won a bronze medal in the team event.

Ho, who won eight successive national championships, began to have hearing loss in the 1990s, which was a hereditary condition in her family. When her hearing got bad enough that she could no longer hear the racket hit the ball she had to give up professional tennis.

In 2009 she represented Chinese Taipei at the Summer Deaflympics being hosted in her home country. She partnered with one of her elder sisters, Ho Chiu-hsiang, in the doubles event and they claimed a silver medal.
