= Corinne Vanier =

French tennis player

- Country (sports): France
- Born: 20 September 1963 (age 63) Rouen, France
- Retired: 1987
- Prize money: $136,367

Grand Slam singles results
- Australian Open: 2R (1982, 1983, 1984)
- French Open: 2R (1982, 1983)
- Wimbledon: 2R (1983)

Grand Slam doubles results
- Australian Open: 2R (1983)
- Wimbledon: 2R (1984)

Corinne Vanier is a former professional tennis player who won the 1981 French Open Girls' doubles championship with Sophie Amiach and played on the WTA tour.

== Life and career ==
Corinne Vanier was born in France on 20 September 1963. She played in Tennis Club de Paris and for France in 1981 Federation Cup.

=== Doubles (0–2) ===
Result	W/L	Date	Tournament	Surface	Partner	Opponents	Score
Loss	0–1	Jan 1982	Newport News, United States	Carpet	(Romania) Lucia Romanov	(United States) Carol Baily (Netherlands) Marcella Mesker	2–6, 1–6
Loss	0–2	Jan 1987	Bayonne, France	Hard	(Poland) Iwona Kuczyńska	(Romania) Virginia Ruzici (France) Catherine Tanvier	3–6, 2–6
