= Carmen Perea =

Spanish tennis player (born 1952)

- Full name: Carmen Perea Alcalá
- Country (sports): Spain
- Born: 3 May 1952 (age 74) Melilla, Spain

Singles

Grand Slam singles results
- French Open: 2R (1976, 1977)

Doubles

Grand Slam doubles results
- French Open: 2R (1975, 1983)
- Wimbledon: 1R (1983)
- US Open: 2R (1982)

Carmen Perea Alcalá (born 3 May 1952) is a former professional tennis player from Spain.

== Biography ==
Perea was born in Melilla, an autonomous Spanish city on the African continent. She later moved to Málaga, and at age 18, settled in Barcelona.

From 1973 to 1983, she appeared in 29 Federation Cup ties for Spain, winning 19 matches overall. One of her singles wins was over West German Sylvia Hanika in 1980. During this period, she was the top female player in Spain, and won nine Spanish Tennis Championships in a run that included 10 successive finals. She featured regularly in the main draw of the French Open and played doubles at Wimbledon and the US Open.

Since retiring from professional tennis, she has worked as a tennis coach and tournament director. She was the coach of Patricia Medrado in the 1980s and more recently coached Nuria Llagostera.

== See also ==
- List of Spain Fed Cup team representatives
