= Yu Liqiao =

Chinese tennis coach and player

- Country (sports): China
- Born: 26 November 1957 (age 67)

Singles
- Career record: 5–4 (Federation Cup)

Doubles
- Career record: 0–3 (Federation Cup)
- Career titles: 1 WTA
Medal record
Asian Games
Silver medal – second place	1982 New Delhi	Women's team
Bronze medal – third place	1978 Bangkok	Women's doubles
Bronze medal – third place	1982 New Delhi	Women's singles

Yu Liqiao (born 26 November 1957) is a Chinese tennis coach and former player. She was an early coach of Li Na.

Yu played for the China Federation Cup team from 1981 to 1983, winning five singles rubbers. She also represented China at the Asian Games and was a singles bronze medalist in 1982.

Her performances on the WTA Tour include a doubles title at the 1979 Borden Classic and a run to the singles quarter-finals of the Japan Open in 1980, beating fifth seed Renáta Tomanová en route.

== WTA Tour finals ==
=== Doubles (1–1) ===
Result	Date	Tournament	Tier	Surface	Partner	Opponents	Score
Win	Oct 1979	Borden Classic, Japan	Colgate Series	Carpet	(China) Chen Chuan	(Australia) Sue Saliba (Australia) Mary Sawyer	6–0, 7–6
Loss	Oct 1979	Japan Open, Japan	Colgate Series	Carpet	(China) Chen Chuan	(United States) Betsy Nagelsen (United States) Penny Johnson	6–3, 4–6, 6–7
