= Seol Min-kyung =

South Korean tennis player

- Country (sports): South Korea
- Born: 17 November 1960 (age 64)
Medal record
Asian Games
Gold medal – first place	1982 New Delhi	Team

Seol Min-kyung (Korean: 설민경; Hanja: 薛旻敬; born 17 November 1960) is a South Korean former tennis player.

== Biography ==
From 1981 to 1985, Seol played in 12 ties for the South Korea Federation Cup team. All of her matches were in singles and included wins over Sabrina Goleš of Yugoslavia and Catherine Suire of France.

Seol was a member of the gold medal winning South Korea team at 1982 Asian Games in New Delhi. Her son Jae-gyun Hwang, a professional baseball player formerly with the San Francisco Giants, won an Asian Games gold with the national team in 2014, making them the country's first mother-son combination to win a gold at the Asian Games.
