= Kim Soo-ok =

South Korean tennis player

- Full name: 김수옥
- Country (sports): South Korea
- Born: 13 August 1961
- Died: 18 May 2019
- Retired: 1986
Medal record
Asian Games
Gold medal – first place	1982 New Delhi	Women's Team
Silver medal – second place	1978 Bangkok	Women's Team
Silver medal – second place	1982 New Delhi	Women's Team
Silver medal – second place	1982 New Delhi	Women's Singles
Bronze medal – third place	1986 Seoul	Women's Singles

Kim Soo-ok (born 13 August 1961) is a South Korean former tennis player.

Kim, who played at Wimbledon as a junior, featured regularly for the South Korea Federation Cup team in the 1980s, winning 19 matches, 11 in singles and eight in doubles.

A two-time individual medalist at the Asian Games, Kim finished with a silver medal behind Etsuko Inoue at the 1982 games in New Delhi and a bronze at 1986 games in Seoul. She won three team medals as well, which included a gold medal in 1982.
