= Anne Gabriel =

Belgian tennis player

- Country (sports): Belgium
- Born: 14 August 1963 (age 62)

Singles

Grand Slam singles results
- French Open: 1R (1982)
- Wimbledon: Q1 (1983)

Anne Gabriel (born 14 August 1963) is a Belgian former professional tennis player.

Gabriel was active on the professional tour in the 1980s. She was a member of the Belgium Federation Cup team from 1981 to 1984, amassing wins in six singles and one doubles rubber. Qualifying for her only French Open main draw in 1982, she came up against Cláudia Monteiro in the first round and lost in three sets.
