= Billie Jean King Cup =

International team competition in women's tennis

- Current season, competition or edition: 2026 Billie Jean King Cup
- Sport: Tennis
- Founded: 1963; 63 years ago
- No. of teams: 8 (World Group); 99 (total 2016)
- Countries: ITF member nations
- Most recent champion: Czech Republic (12th title)
- Most titles: United States (18 titles)
- Website: billiejeankingcup.com

The Billie Jean King Cup, abbreviated as the BJK Cup, is the premier international team competition in women's tennis, launched as the Federation Cup in 1963 to celebrate the 50th anniversary of the International Tennis Federation (ITF). The name was changed to the Fed Cup in 1995, and changed again in September 2020 in honor of former World No. 1 Billie Jean King. The Billie Jean King Cup is the world's largest annual women's international team sports competition in terms of the number of nations that compete. The current chair is Katrina Adams.

The men's equivalent of the Billie Jean King Cup is the Davis Cup. The Czech Republic, Australia, Russia, Italy, and the United States are the only countries to have won both Cups in the same year.

== History ==
Old logo in the Fed Cup era

In 1919, Hazel Hotchkiss Wightman had an idea for a women's team tennis competition. This was not adopted but she persisted, presenting a trophy at the 1923 annual contest between the United States and Great Britain, named the Wightman Cup.

Nell Hopman, wife of the legendary Australian Davis Cup Captain Harry Hopman, later took up Mrs Wightman's original idea. In 1962, a British resident of the United States, Mary Hardwick Hare, presented a dossier proving that support for such an event was overwhelming, persuading the ITF that it was a 'good idea' to have a team championship played over one week in a different venue each year. 40 years after Wightman's idea of a women's Davis Cup, it became a reality. In 1963, the ITF launched the Federation Cup to celebrate its 50th anniversary. Open to all nations the competition became a resounding success.

The inaugural event attracted 16 countries. The competition was supported by the top players right from the start. Held at the Queen's Club, in London, the first contest was between Australia and the United States. Grand Slam champions Darlene Hard, Billie Jean King, Margaret Smith and Lesley Turner all proudly representing their country on court. The United States would emerge the champion nation in the opening year. However, it was to be Australia in the early years, winning seven of the next eleven championships. Around 1980 the United States was able to establish some significant mark on the competition setting in future years a very high standard for others to compete against.

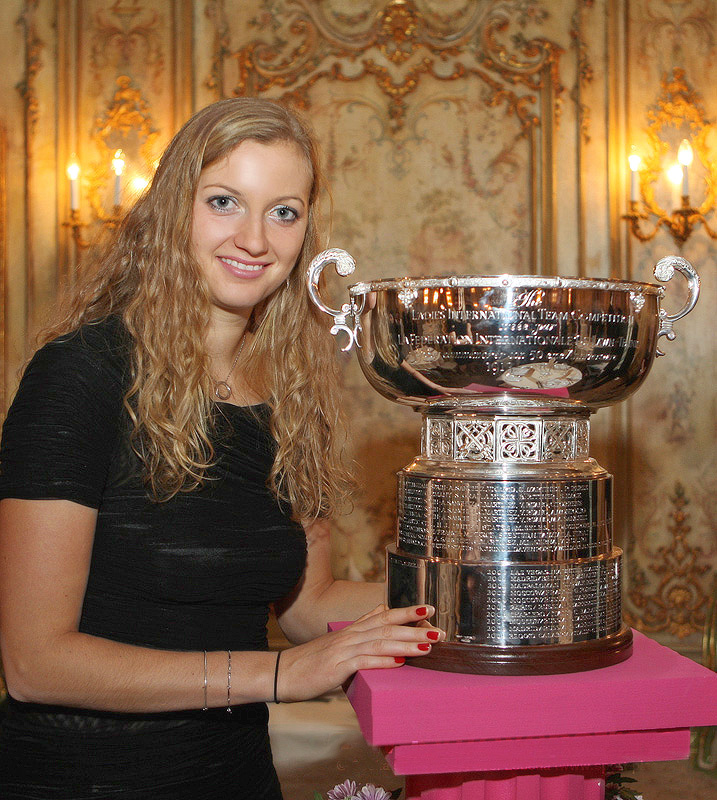
Petra Kvitová with the trophy for the Fed Cup winners, 2011, Moscow

The first Federation Cup had attracted 16 entry teams, despite no prize money and teams having to meet their own expenses. When sponsorship became available, the number of teams expanded dramatically, first by the Colgate Group in 1976, and, from 1981 to 1994 by the Japanese communications and computer giant NEC. In 1994, there were 73 nations competing, with the host nation of a Federation Cup week was now being required to build a special tennis complex, giving rise to what became known as the Federation Cup "legacy". The additional costs of each event could be offset with the host nations viewing their involvement as providing an opportunity to boost their national game.

For the 1992, a regional group qualifying format was introduced. In 1995, the event's name was shortened to the Fed Cup, and a new home-and-away format was adopted as per the Davis Cup, so that women could play for their country in their own country. There have been a number of smaller changes to the format since 1995. The format change implemented in 2005 incorporates an eight Nation World Group I and eight nation World Group II both playing home-and-away over three weekends throughout the year. Three regional groups compete and there are promotions and relegations based on results.

The 2021 edition is set to have US$12 million in prize money.

In April 2025, the sports betting platform 1xBet was named the Official Global Betting Partner of the event. The deal includes exclusive branding rights across qualifiers, playoffs, and finals until 2026, marking the first standalone betting sponsorship of BJK's history.

== Format ==
=== Competition ===
While many nations enter the BJK Cup each year, only 16 countries qualify for the elite World Group and World Group II each year (eight in World Group and eight in World Group II).

They reach World Group and World Group II as follows:

- (a) World Group – the four nations that win their World Group first round tie remain in the World Group for the following year. First round losers contest the World Group play-offs against the four winning nations from World Group II to determine relegation/promotion for the following year's competition. (The four nations that win World Group play-offs will be in the World Group the following year, while the four losers will start the following year in World Group II.)
- (b) World Group II – the four nations that win their World Group II ties will compete in the World Group I Play-Offs to determine relegation/promotion for the following year, as described above. Similarly the four nations that lose their World Group II ties will face winning nations from Group I Zonal competitions, in the World Group II play-offs, to determine relegation/promotion. (The four nations that win their World Group II play-offs will be in World Group II the following year, while the four losers will begin the next year in Group I Zonal events.)

Once in the World Group or World Group II, four nations will be seeded in each. The decision as to which nations will be seeded is made by the BJK Cup Committee, according to the ITF BJK Cup Nations Ranking.

At the levels below the World Group and World Group II, the BJK Cup nations compete in Zonal Competition events, which are split into three zones: The Americas Zone, the Asia/Oceania Zone and the Europe/Africa Zone. In each zone there are two groups, Group I being the higher and Group II the lower, except for the Europe/Africa Zone, which also has a Group III.

Within the Group zonal regions, teams are split into pools and play against each other in a round robin format. The exact format of each Group event, and promotion and relegation between them, varies according to the number of participating teams. Two teams are always promoted from Europe/Africa Group I to that year's World Group II Play-Offs, while one team each go to the World Group II Play-Offs from Americas Group I and Asia/Oceania Zone Group I.

=== Current structure ===
This structure has been implemented since 2016.

Level	Group(s)		
1	World Group I 8 countries		
	World Group I Playoff 4 countries from World Group I + 4 countries from World Group II		
2	World Group II 8 countries		
	World Group II Playoff 4 countries from World Group II + 2 countries from Group One Euro/African Zone + 1 country from Group One Americas Zone + 1 country from Group One Asia/Oceania Zone		
3	Group One American Zone 8 countries	Group One Euro/African Zone 15 countries	Group One Asia/Oceania Zone 7 countries
4	Group Two American Zone 11 countries	Group Two Euro/African Zone 7 countries	Group Two Asia/Oceania Zone 15 countries
5		Group Three Euro/African Zone 16 countries	

=== Ties ===
In World Group and World Group II, and World Group and World Group II Play-off ties, each tie is contested in a best of five matches format, and is played across two days. On the first day there are two singles matches, and then the reverse singles matches take place on the following day. The final match is a doubles.

In Zonal Groups I, II and III, ties are played over the best of three matches (two singles and a doubles).

The First Round Ties in the World Group and World Group II are played on a home and away knock-out basis, and take place over a weekend in the early part of the year.

World Group Semi-finals and Final are played over on a home and away knock-out basis, and take place over a weekend in July (Semi-finals) and September (Final).

Play-off ties for World Group and World Group II will also be played on a home and away knock-out basis taking place in July.

The choice of ground for First Round, Semi-finals and Play-off ties is decided by lot or goes automatically to one of the competing nations.

As Groups I, II and III are played in a round robin format in all three zones, each event takes place at a single venue over one week. These are held in the first half of the year (to allow promotion of teams to the World Group II Play-off ties in the second half of the year), and dates and venues are decided by the BJK Cup Committee.

== Records and statistics ==
=== List of championship finals ===
Year	Winner	Score	Runner-up	Finals Venue (surface)	City	Country
Federation Cup
1963	United States (1)	2–1	Australia (1)	Queen's Club (G)	London	United Kingdom
1964	Australia (1)	2–1	United States (1)	Germantown Cricket Club (G)	Philadelphia	United States
1965	Australia (2)	2–1	United States (2)	Kooyong Club (G)	Melbourne	Australia
1966	United States (2)	3–0	West Germany (1)	Turin Press Sporting Club (C)	Turin	Italy
1967	United States (3)	2–0	Great Britain (1)	Blau-Weiss T.C. (C)	West Berlin	West Germany
1968	Australia (3)	3–0	Netherlands (1)	Stade Roland Garros (C)	Paris	France
1969	United States (4)	2–1	Australia (2)	Athens Tennis Club (C)	Athens	(Kingdom of Greece) Greece
1970	Australia (4)	3–0	West Germany (2)	Freiburg T.C. (C)	Freiburg	West Germany
1971	Australia (5)	3–0	Great Britain (2)	Royal King's Park T.C. (G)	Perth	Australia
1972	South Africa (1)	2–1	Great Britain (3)	Ellis Park (H)	Johannesburg	South Africa
1973	Australia (6)	3–0	South Africa (1)	Bad Homburg T.C. (C)	Bad Homburg	West Germany
1974	Australia (7)	2–1	United States (3)	Naples T.C. (C)	Naples	Italy
1975	Czechoslovakia (1)	3–0	Australia (3)	Aixoise C.C. (C)	Aix-en-Provence	France
1976	United States (5)	2–1	Australia (4)	The Spectrum (ICp)	Philadelphia	United States
1977	United States (6)	2–1	Australia (5)	Devonshire Park (G)	Eastbourne	United Kingdom
1978	United States (7)	2–1	Australia (6)	Kooyong Club (G)	Melbourne	Australia
1979	United States (8)	3–0	Australia (7)	RSHE Club Campo (C)	Madrid	Spain
1980	United States (9)	3–0	Australia (8)	Rot-Weiss Tennis Club (C)	West Berlin	West Germany
1981	United States (10)	3–0	Great Britain (4)	Tamagawa-en Racquet Club (C)	Tokyo	Japan
1982	United States (11)	3–0	West Germany (3)	Decathlon Club (H)	Santa Clara	United States
1983	Czechoslovakia (2)	2–1	West Germany (4)	Albisguetli T.C. (C)	Zürich	Switzerland
1984	Czechoslovakia (3)	2–1	Australia (9)	Pinheiros Sports Club (C)	São Paulo	Brazil
1985	Czechoslovakia (4)	2–1	United States (4)	Nagoya Green T.C. (H)	Nagoya	Japan
1986	United States (12)	3–0	Czechoslovakia (1)	I. ČLTK Prague (C)	Prague	(Czech Republic) Czechoslovakia
1987	West Germany (1)	2–1	United States (5)	Hollyburn C.C. (H)	Vancouver	Canada
1988	Czechoslovakia (5)	2–1	Soviet Union (1)	Flinders Park (H)	Melbourne	Australia
1989	United States (13)	3–0	Spain (1)	Ariake Forest Park Centre (H)	Tokyo	Japan
1990	United States (14)	2–1	Soviet Union (2)	Peachtree W.O.T. (H)	Atlanta	United States
1991	Spain (1)	2–1	United States (6)	Nottingham Tennis Centre (H)	Nottingham	United Kingdom
1992	Germany (2)	2–1	Spain (2)	Waldstadion T.C. (C)	Frankfurt	Germany
1993	Spain (2)	3–0	Australia (10)	Waldstadion T.C. (C)	Frankfurt	Germany
1994	Spain (3)	3–0	United States (7)	Waldstadion T.C. (C)	Frankfurt	Germany
Fed Cup
1995	Spain (4)	3–2	United States (8)	Valencia T.C. (C)	Valencia	Spain
1996	United States (15)	5–0	Spain (3)	Atlantic City Convention Center (ICp)	Atlantic City	United States
1997	France (1)	4–1	Netherlands (2)	Brabant Hall (ICp)	Den Bosch	Netherlands
1998	Spain (5)	3–2	Switzerland (1)	Palexpo Hall (IH)	Geneva	Switzerland
1999	United States (16)	4–1	Russia (3)	Taube Tennis Stadium (H)	Stanford	United States
2000	United States (17)	5–0	Spain (4)	Mandalay Bay Events Center (ICp)	Las Vegas	United States
2001	Belgium (1)	2–1	Russia (4)	Parque Ferial Juan Carlos I (IC)	Madrid	Spain
2002	Slovakia (1)	3–1	Spain (5)	Palacio de Congresos (IH)	Gran Canaria	Spain
2003	France (2)	4–1	United States (9)	Olympic Stadium (ICp)	Moscow	Russia
2004	Russia (1)	3–2	France (1)	Ice Stadium Krylatskoe (ICp)	Moscow	Russia
2005	Russia (2)	3–2	France (2)	Court Philippe Chatrier (C)	Paris	France
2006	Italy (1)	3–2	Belgium (1)	Spiroudome (IH)	Charleroi	Belgium
2007	Russia (3)	4–0	Italy (1)	Luzhniki Palace of Sports (IH)	Moscow	Russia
2008	Russia (4)	4–0	Spain (6)	Club de Campo Villa de Madrid (C)	Madrid	Spain
2009	Italy (2)	4–0	United States (10)	Circolo del Tennis (C)	Reggio Calabria	Italy
2010	Italy (3)	3–1	United States (11)	San Diego Sports Arena (IH)	San Diego	United States
2011	Czech Republic (6)	3–2	Russia (5)	Olympic Stadium (IH)	Moscow	Russia
2012	Czech Republic (7)	3–1	Serbia (1)	O2 Arena (IH)	Prague	Czech Republic
2013	Italy (4)	4–0	Russia (6)	Tennis Club Cagliari (C)	Cagliari	Italy
2014	Czech Republic (8)	3–1	Germany (5)	O2 Arena (IH)	Prague	Czech Republic
2015	Czech Republic (9)	3–2	Russia (7)	O2 Arena (IH)	Prague	Czech Republic
2016	Czech Republic (10)	3–2	France (3)	Rhénus Sport (IH)	Strasbourg	France
2017	United States (18)	3–2	Belarus (1)	Čyžoŭka-Arena (IH)	Minsk	Belarus
2018	Czech Republic (11)	3–0	United States (12)	O2 Arena (IH)	Prague	Czech Republic
2019	France (3)	3–2	Australia (11)	RAC Arena (H)	Perth	Australia
Billie Jean King Cup
2020–21	RTF (5)	2–0	Switzerland (2)	O2 Arena (IH)	Prague	Czech Republic
2022	Switzerland (1)	2–0	Australia (12)	Emirates Arena (IH)	Glasgow	United Kingdom
2023	Canada (1)	2–0	Italy (2)	Estadio de La Cartuja (IH)	Seville	Spain
2024	Italy (5)	2–0	Slovakia (1)	Martin Carpena Arena (IH)	Málaga	Spain
2025	Italy (6)	2–0	United States (13)	Shenzhen Bay Sports Center (IH)	Shenzhen	China
2026	Czech Republic (12)	2–0	Ukraine (1)	Shenzhen Bay Sports Center (IH)	Shenzhen	China
2027		–			Shenzhen	China

=== Performance by country ===
Country	Years won	Runners-up
United States ^{J}	1963, 1966, 1967, 1969, 1976, 1977, 1978, 1979, 1980, 1981, 1982, 1986, 1989, 1990, 1996, 1999, 2000, 2017 (18)	1964, 1965, 1974, 1985, 1987, 1991, 1994, 1995, 2003, 2009, 2010, 2018, 2025 (13)
Czechoslovakia ^{J} Czech Republic ^{J}	1975, 1983, 1984, 1985, 1988, 2011, 2012, 2014, 2015, 2016, 2018, 2026 (12)	1986 (1)
Australia ^{J}	1964, 1965, 1968, 1970, 1971, 1973, 1974 (7)	1963, 1969, 1975, 1976, 1977, 1978, 1979, 1980, 1984, 1993, 2019, 2022 (12)
Italy ^{J}	2006, 2009, 2010, 2013, 2024, 2025 (6)	2007, 2023 (2)
Soviet Union; Russia ^{J} RTF	2004, 2005, 2007, 2008, 2020–21 (5)	1988, 1990, 1999, 2001, 2011, 2013, 2015 (7)
Spain	1991, 1993, 1994, 1995, 1998 (5)	1989, 1992, 1996, 2000, 2002, 2008 (6)
France ^{J}	1997, 2003, 2019 (3)	2004, 2005, 2016 (3)
West Germany ^{J} Germany ^{J}	1987, 1992 (2)	1966, 1970, 1982, 1983, 2014 (5)
Switzerland	2022 (1)	1998, 2020–21 (2)
South Africa ^{J}	1972 (1)	1973 (1)
Belgium ^{J}	2001 (1)	2006 (1)
Slovakia	2002 (1)	2024 (1)
Canada	2023 (1)	–
Great Britain	–	1967, 1971, 1972, 1981 (4)
Netherlands	–	1968, 1997 (2)
Serbia	–	2012 (1)
Belarus	–	2017 (1)
Ukraine	–	2026 (1)

J - Won both the Billie Jean King Cup and the Junior Billie Jean King Cup titles.

=== Titles by country (since 1995) ===
Country	Titles	First	Last
Czech Republic	7	2011	2026
Italy	6	2006	2025
Russia; RTF	5	2004	2021
United States	4	1996	2017
France	3	1997	2019
Spain	2	1995	1998
Belgium	1	2001	
Slovakia	1	2002	
Switzerland	1	2022	
Canada	1	2023	

=== Results by country in BJK Cup Finals ===
Country	App	Won	2021	2022	2023	2024	2025	2026
Australia	4	0	SF	F	RR	QF	DNQ	DNQ
Belarus	1	0	RR	susp.	susp.	susp.	susp.	susp.
Belgium	3	0	RR	RR	DNQ	DNQ	DNQ	QF
Canada	4	1	RR	RR	W	QF	DNQ	DNQ
China	2	0	DNQ	DNQ	DNQ	DNQ	QF	QF
Czech Republic	5	1	RR	SF	SF	QF	DNQ	W
France	2	0	RR	DNQ	RR	DNQ	DNQ	DNQ
Germany	3	0	RR	DNQ	RR	1R	DNQ	DNQ
Great Britain	4	0	DNQ	SF	DNQ	SF	SF	QF
Italy	5	2	DNQ	RR	F	W	W	SF
Japan	2	0	DNQ	DNQ	DNQ	QF	QF	DNQ
Kazakhstan	4	0	DNQ	RR	RR	DNQ	QF	QF
Poland	3	0	DNQ	RR	RR	SF	DNQ	DNQ
Romania	1	0	DNQ	DNQ	DNQ	1R	DNQ	DNQ
Russia	1	1	W	susp.	susp.	susp.	susp.	susp.
Slovakia	3	0	RR	RR	DNQ	F	DNQ	DNQ
Slovenia	1	0	DNQ	DNQ	SF	DNQ	DNQ	DNQ
Spain	6	0	RR	RR	RR	1R	QF	SF
Switzerland	3	1	F	W	RR	DNQ	DNQ	DNQ
Ukraine	2	0	DNQ	DNQ	DNQ	DNQ	SF	F
United States	5	0	SF	RR	RR	1R	F	DNQ

=== Team records ===
- Consecutive titles
  - All-time: 7, United States, 1976–1982
- Consecutive finals appearances
  - All-time: 8, Australia, 1973–1980
- Most number of games in a tie
  - Best of Five Format: 162, France 4–1 Japan, 1997 World Group First Round
  - Best of Three Format: 104, Canada 2–1 Switzerland, 1977 Consolation Second Round
- Years present in BJK Cup Finals
- Australia 4
- Belarus 1
- Belgium 2
- Canada 4
- China 2
- Czech Republic 5
- France 2
- Germany 3
- Great Britain 4
- Italy 5
- Japan 2
- Kazakhstan 4
- Poland 3
- Romania 1
- Russia 1
- Slovakia 3
- Slovenia 1
- Spain 6
- Switzerland 3
- Ukraine 2
- United States 5

=== Individual records ===
- Youngest player
  - Denise Panagopoulou; Greece; 12 years, 360 days^{1}
- Oldest player
  - Gill Butterfield; Bermuda; 52 years, 162 days
- Most rubbers played
  - 118, Anne Kremer, Luxembourg
- Most ties played
  - 76 Claudine Schaul, Luxembourg
- Most rubbers won
  - Total: 72, Arantxa Sánchez Vicario, Spain
  - Singles: 50, Arantxa Sánchez Vicario, Spain
  - Doubles: 38, Larisa Savchenko-Neiland, Soviet Union / Latvia
- Longest rubber
  - 2016 World Group First Round: Richèl Hogenkamp, Netherlands defeated Svetlana Kuznetsova, Russia in 4 hours, 7–6^{(7–4)}, 5–7, 10–8.
- Most successful captain
  - Petr Pála; 6 titles, Czech Republic

^{1}Players must now be aged 14 and over

== Heart Award ==
The Heart Award is the ITF's annual "MVP" award related to the Billie Jean King Cup, which "aims to recognise players who have represented their country with distinction, shown exceptional courage on court and demonstrated outstanding commitment to the team." The award was inaugurated in 2009.

Year	World Group					
2009	(United States) Melanie Oudin	—N/a				
	World Group SF	WG / WG II play-offs	WG / WG II R1	Americas ZG I	Asia/Oceania ZG I	Europe/Africa ZG I
2010	(Italy) Francesca Schiavone	(Belgium) Yanina Wickmayer	(Serbia) Jelena Janković	(Brazil) Maria Fernanda Alves	(Japan) Kimiko Date-Krumm	(Slovenia) Katarina Srebotnik
2011	(Czech Republic) Petra Kvitová	(Germany) Andrea Petkovic	(Serbia) Bojana Jovanovski	(Peru) Bianca Botto	(Japan) Ayumi Morita	(Belarus) Victoria Azarenka
2012	(Serbia) Jelena Janković	Not awarded	(Slovakia) Daniela Hantuchová	(Colombia) Catalina Castaño	(China) Li Na	(Sweden) Sofia Arvidsson
2013	(Italy) Sara Errani	Not awarded	(Slovakia) Daniela Hantuchová	(Brazil) Paula Cristina Gonçalves	(Kazakhstan) Galina Voskoboeva	(Poland) Agnieszka Radwańska
2014	(Germany) Andrea Petkovic	Not awarded	(Poland) Agnieszka Radwańska	(Brazil) Teliana Pereira	(Uzbekistan) Sabina Sharipova	(Romania) Simona Halep
2015	(Czech Republic) Lucie Šafářová	(Italy) Flavia Pennetta	(Romania) Irina-Camelia Begu	(Paraguay) Verónica Cepede Royg	(Thailand) Tamarine Tanasugarn	(Turkey) Çağla Büyükakçay
2016	(France) Caroline Garcia	(Chinese Taipei) Hsu Ching-Wen	(Belarus) Aliaksandra Sasnovich	(Argentina) Nadia Podoroska	(Chinese Taipei) Hsieh Su-wei	(Ukraine) Kateryna Bondarenko
2017	(Belarus) Aliaksandra Sasnovich	(Germany) Julia Görges	(Belarus) Aryna Sabalenka	(Canada) Bianca Andreescu	(Kazakhstan) Galina Voskoboeva	(United Kingdom) Heather Watson
2018	(Czech Republic) Petra Kvitová	(Canada) Eugenie Bouchard	(France) Kristina Mladenovic	(Paraguay) Montserrat González	(Kazakhstan) Yulia Putintseva	(Serbia) Olga Danilović
2019	(Australia) Ashleigh Barty	(United Kingdom) Katie Boulter	(Romania) Simona Halep	(Brazil) Carolina Meligeni Alves	(Kazakhstan) Zarina Diyas	(United Kingdom) Johanna Konta
	Finals	Qualifiers	Play-offs	Americas Group I	Asia/Oceania Group I	Europe/Africa Group I
2020–21	(Switzerland) Belinda Bencic	(Latvia) Anastasija Sevastova	(Canada) Leylah Fernandez	(Mexico) Fernanda Contreras Gómez	(India) Sania Mirza	(Estonia) Anett Kontaveit
2022	(Australia) Storm Sanders	(Poland) Iga Świątek	(Brazil) Beatriz Haddad Maia	(Brazil) Beatriz Haddad Maia	(India) Ankita Raina	(Slovenia) Kaja Juvan
2023	(Canada) Leylah Fernandez	(Canada) Leylah Fernandez	(Ukraine) Anhelina Kalinina	(Argentina) Julia Riera	(South Korea) Back Da-yeon	(Sweden) Rebecca Peterson
2024	(Italy) Jasmine Paolini	(Romania) Ana Bogdan	(Brazil) Beatriz Haddad Maia	(Argentina) Julia Riera	(China) Wang Xinyu	(Denmark) Clara Tauson
2025	(Ukraine) Elina Svitolina	(Ukraine) Elina Svitolina	(Poland) Iga Świątek	(Mexico) Victoria Rodríguez	(India) Shrivalli Bhamidipaty	(Portugal) Matilde Jorge

== Current rankings ==
For more information, see ITF rankings

ITF Billie Jean King Cup Nations Ranking, as of 17 November 2025
Rank	Nation	Points	Move^{†}
1	Italy	1,435.00	Steady
2	United States	1,246.50	Steady
3	Great Britain	1,215.00	Steady
4	Canada	1,143.75	▲2
5	Spain	1,093.75	▼1
6	Czech Republic	1,085.00	▲5
7	Poland	1,048.75	▲2
8	Ukraine	1,035.00	▼3
9	Kazakhstan	1,022.50	▼2
10	Japan	996.25	▼2
11	Slovakia	987.50	▼1
12	Australia	977.50	Steady
13	Switzerland	891.25	▲3
14	Netherlands	854.25	Steady
15	Romania	826.25	Steady
16	Germany	806.25	▼3
17	Belgium	790.00	▲1
18	Slovenia	788.75	▲1
19	China	738.75	▼2
20	Brazil	717.50	▲1

^{†}Change since previous ranking update

== See also ==
- Junior Davis Cup and Junior Billie Jean King Cup
- International Tennis Federation
- Davis Cup
- Hopman Cup
- Wightman Cup
- United Cup
