= 1979 Federation Cup (tennis) =

International women's tennis competition

Details
- Duration: 30 April – 6 May
- Edition: 17th

Champion
- Winning nation: United States

The 1979 Federation Cup was the 17th edition of the most important competition between national teams in women's tennis. The tournament was held at the RSHE Club Campo in Madrid, Spain, from 30 April – 6 May. The United States won their fourth consecutive title, defeating Australia in their ninth final.

== Participating teams ==
Participating Teams
Argentina	Australia	Belgium	Canada	Chinese Taipei	Czechoslovakia	Denmark	France
Great Britain	Hungary	Indonesia	Ireland	Israel	Italy	Japan	Luxembourg
Mexico	Netherlands	New Zealand	Norway	Philippines	Portugal	Romania	South Korea
Soviet Union	Spain	Sweden	Switzerland	Thailand	United States	West Germany	Yugoslavia

== Draw ==
All ties were played at the RSHE Club Campo in Madrid, Spain, on clay courts. |}

First Round
United States
Philippines	w/o
South Korea	0
West Germany	3
Thailand	0
Italy	3
Indonesia	0
France	3
Switzerland	3
Denmark	0
Mexico	1
Romania	2
Chinese Taipei	1
Luxembourg	2
Portugal	0
Soviet Union	3
Great Britain	3
New Zealand	0
Ireland	0
Belgium	3
Czechoslovakia	3
Hungary	0
Sweden	3
Israel	0
Netherlands	3
Argentina	0
Japan	3
Norway	0
Spain	1
Yugoslavia	2
Canada	0
Australia	3

Second Round
United States	3
West Germany	0
Italy	1
France	2
Switzerland	2
Romania	1
Luxembourg	0
Soviet Union	3
Great Britain	3
Belgium	0
Czechoslovakia	2
Sweden	1
Netherlands	3
Japan	0
Yugoslavia	0
Australia	3

Quarterfinals
United States	3
France	0
Switzerland	1
Soviet Union	2
Great Britain	0
Czechoslovakia	3
Netherlands	1
Australia	2

Semifinals
United States	2
Soviet Union	0
Czechoslovakia	0
Australia	3

Final
United States	3
Australia	0

1st Round losing teams play in Consolation rounds

=== First round ===
==== United States vs. Philippines ====
Canceled; Philippines withdrew

==== South Korea vs. West Germany ====
South Korea
0
RSHE Club Campo, Madrid, Spain
April – May 1979
Red clay (outdoor)

West Germany
3

			1	2	3
1	(South Korea) (West Germany)	Kim Nam-sook; Iris Riedel-Kuhn	1; 6	1; 6
2	(South Korea) (West Germany)	Lee Duk-hee; Sylvia Hanika	1; 6	1; 6
3	(South Korea) (West Germany)	Lee Duk-hee / Lee soon-oh Katja Ebbinghaus / Sylvia Hanika	1; 6	5; 7

==== Thailand vs. Italy ====
Thailand
0
RSHE Club Campo, Madrid, Spain
April – May 1979
Red clay (outdoor)

Italy
3

			1	2	3
1	(Thailand) (Italy)	Suthasini Sirikaya; Sabina Simmonds	1; 6	2; 6
2	(Thailand) (Italy)	Chalada Wattana; Daniela Marzano	3; 6	1; 6
3	(Thailand) (Italy)	Chalada Wattana / Suthasini Sirikaya; Barbara Rossi / Manuela Zoni	6; 4	5; 7	6; 8

==== Indonesia vs. France ====
Indonesia
0
RSHE Club Campo, Madrid, Spain
April – May 1979
Red clay (outdoor)

France
3

			1	2	3
1	(Indonesia) (France)	Lita Sugiarto; Frédérique Thibault	0; 6	2; 6
2	(Indonesia) (France)	Yolanda Soemarno; Brigitte Simon	1; 6	5; 7
3	(Indonesia) (France)	Lita Sugiarto / Yolanda Soemarno; Françoise Dürr / Frédérique Thibault	2; 6	1; 6

==== Switzerland vs. Denmark ====
Switzerland
3
RSHE Club Campo, Madrid, Spain
April – May 1979
Red clay (outdoor)

Denmark
0

			1	2	3
1	(Switzerland) (Denmark)	Christiane Jolissaint; Birgitte Hermansen	6; 4	6; 2
2	(Switzerland) (Denmark)	Petra Delhees; Dorte Ekner	6; 3	7; 5
3	(Switzerland) (Denmark)	Petra Delhees / Christiane Jolissaint; Dorte Ekner / Birgitte Hermansen	6; 3	6; 3

==== Mexico vs. Romania ====
Mexico
1
RSHE Club Campo, Madrid, Spain
April – May 1979
Red clay (outdoor)

Romania
2

			1	2	3
1	(Mexico) (Romania)	Maluca Llamas; Lucia Romanov	3; 6	2; 6
2	(Mexico) (Romania)	Alejandra Vallejo; Mariana Simionescu	3; 6	6; 8
3	(Mexico) (Romania)	Maluca Llamas / Alejandra Vallejo; Lucia Romanov / Maria Romanov	6; 3	6; 2

==== Chinese Taipei vs. Luxembourg ====
Chinese Taipei
1
RSHE Club Campo, Madrid, Spain
April – May 1979
Red clay (outdoor)

Luxembourg
2

			1	2	3
1	(Chinese Taipei) (Luxembourg)	Wen Hsiu-tsuan; Rita Krombach	6; 2	5; 7	6; 1
2	(Chinese Taipei) (Luxembourg)	Ho Chiu-mei; Simone Wolter	3; 6	4; 6
3	(Chinese Taipei) (Luxembourg)	Ho Chiu-mei / Wen Hsiu-tsuan; Rita Krombach / Simone Wolter	3; 6	3; 6

==== Portugal vs. Soviet Union ====
Portugal
0
RSHE Club Campo, Madrid, Spain
April – May 1979
Red clay (outdoor)

Soviet Union
3

			1	2	3
1	(Portugal) (Soviet Union)	Leonora Peralta; Natasha Chmyreva	3; 6	2; 6
2	(Portugal) (Soviet Union)	Deborah Fiúza; Olga Morozova	0; 6	1; 6
3	(Portugal) (Soviet Union)	Manuel Maria Cabral Lencastre / Leonora Peralta; Irina Shevchenko / Olga Zaitseva	4; 6	2; 6

==== Great Britain vs. New Zealand ====
Great Britain
3
RSHE Club Campo, Madrid, Spain
April – May 1979
Red clay (outdoor)

New Zealand
0

			1	2	3
1	(United Kingdom) (New Zealand)	Sue Barker; Chris Newton	6; 0	6; 0
2	(United Kingdom) (New Zealand)	Virginia Wade; Brenda Perry	6; 2	6; 3
3	(United Kingdom) (New Zealand)	Sue Barker / Virginia Wade; Chris Newton / Brenda Perry	6; 1	6; 1

==== Ireland vs. Belgium ====
Ireland
0
RSHE Club Campo, Madrid, Spain
April – May 1979
Red clay (outdoor)

Belgium
3

			1	2	3
1	(Republic of Ireland) (Belgium)	Bernadette Davy; Monique Van Haver	1; 6	6; 3	2; 6
2	(Republic of Ireland) (Belgium)	Helen Lennon; Michele Gurdal	1; 6	0; 6
3	(Republic of Ireland) (Belgium)	Helen Lennon / Jo Sheridan; Michele Gurdal / Monique Van Haver	3; 6	1; 6

==== Czechoslovakia vs. Hungary ====
Czechoslovakia
3
RSHE Club Campo, Madrid, Spain
April – May 1979
Red clay (outdoor)

Hungary
0

			1	2	3
1	(Czechoslovakia) (Hungary)	Regina Maršíková; Judit Szörényi	6; 3	6; 0
2	(Czechoslovakia) (Hungary)	Hana Mandlíková; Anna Németh	6; 1	6; 4
3	(Czechoslovakia) (Hungary)	Hana Mandlíková / Regina Maršíková; Éva Rózsavölgyi / Judit Szörényi	6; 2	6; 3

==== Sweden vs. Israel ====
Sweden
3
RSHE Club Campo, Madrid, Spain
April – May 1979
Red clay (outdoor)

Israel
0

			1	2	3
1	(Sweden) (Israel)	Lena Sandin; Hagit Zubary	6; 3	6; 2
2	(Sweden) (Israel)	Helena Anliot; Paulina Peled	6; 3	8; 6
3	(Sweden) (Israel)	Helena Anliot / Mimmi Wikstedt; Paulina Peled / Hagit Zubary	6; 2	6; 4

==== Netherlands vs. Argentina ====
Netherlands
3
RSHE Club Campo, Madrid, Spain
April – May 1979
Red clay (outdoor)

Argentina
0

			1	2	3
1	(Netherlands) (Argentina)	Elly Appel; Emilse Raponi	6; 2	7; 5
2	(Netherlands) (Argentina)	Betty Stöve; Ivanna Madruga Ossès	6; 4	6; 4
3	(Netherlands) (Argentina)	Marcella Mesker / Betty Stöve; Viviana González / Adriana Villagrán Reami	6; 0	6; 4

==== Japan vs. Norway ====
Japan
3
RSHE Club Campo, Madrid, Spain
April – May 1979
Red clay (outdoor)

Norway
0

			1	2	3
1	(Japan) (Norway)	Naoko Sato; Bente Kjolstad	6; 3	6; 1
2	(Japan) (Norway)	Sonoe Yonezawa; Ellen Grindvold	6; 4	6; 1
3	(Japan) (Norway)	Kiyoko Nomura / Naoko Sato; Ellen Grindvold / Bente Kjolstad	6; 2	6; 2

==== Spain vs. Yugoslavia ====
Spain
1
RSHE Club Campo, Madrid, Spain
April – May 1979
Red clay (outdoor)

Yugoslavia
2

			1	2	3
1	(Spain) (Socialist Federal Republic of Yugoslavia)	Mónica Álvarez de Mon; Renata Šašak	6; 3	6; 1
2	(Spain) (Socialist Federal Republic of Yugoslavia)	Carmen Perea; Mima Jaušovec	2; 6	0; 6
3	(Spain) (Socialist Federal Republic of Yugoslavia)	Mónica Álvarez de Mon / Carmen Perea; Mima Jaušovec / Renata Šašak	8; 10	6; 3	1; 6

==== Canada vs. Australia ====
Canada
0
RSHE Club Campo, Madrid, Spain
April – May 1979
Red clay (outdoor)

Australia
3

			1	2	3
1	(Canada) (Australia)	Nina Bland; Wendy Turnbull	4; 6	1; 6
2	(Canada) (Australia)	Marjorie Blackwood; Dianne Fromholtz	4; 6	2; 6
3	(Canada) (Australia)	Marjorie Blackwood / Lisette Senn; Kerry Reid / Wendy Turnbull	6; 8	1; 6

=== Second round ===
==== United States vs. West Germany ====
United States
3
RSHE Club Campo, Madrid, Spain
May 1979
Red clay (outdoor)

West Germany
0

			1	2	3
1	(United States) (West Germany)	Tracy Austin; Iris Riedel-Kuhn	6; 1	6; 3
2	(United States) (West Germany)	Chris Evert Lloyd; Sylvia Hanika	6; 4	6; 2
3	(United States) (West Germany)	Rosemary Casals / Chris Evert Lloyd; Katja Ebbinghaus / Sylvia Hanika	6; 1	6; 4

==== Italy vs. France ====
Italy
1
RSHE Club Campo, Madrid, Spain
May 1979
Red clay (outdoor)

France
2

			1	2	3
1	(Italy) (France)	Daniela Marzano; Frédérique Thibault	6; 4	1; 6	6; 2
2	(Italy) (France)	Sabina Simmonds; Françoise Dürr	6; 2	3; 6	3; 6
3	(Italy) (France)	Daniela Marzano / Sabina Simmonds; Françoise Dürr / Frédérique Thibault	3; 6	5; 7

==== Switzerland vs. Romania ====
Switzerland
2
RSHE Club Campo, Madrid, Spain
May 1979
Red clay (outdoor)

Romania
1

			1	2	3
1	(Switzerland) (Romania)	Christiane Jolissaint; Lucia Romanov	3; 6	1; 6
2	(Switzerland) (Romania)	Petra Delhees; Mariana Simionescu	9; 7	9; 7
3	(Switzerland) (Romania)	Petra Delhees / Christiane Jolissaint; Lucia Romanov / Mariana Simionescu	6; 4	6; 2

==== Luxembourg vs. Soviet Union ====
Luxembourg
0
RSHE Club Campo, Madrid, Spain
May 1979
Red clay (outdoor)

Soviet Union
3

			1	2	3
1	(Luxembourg) (Soviet Union)	Rita Krombach; Irina Shevchenko	0; 6	2; 6
2	(Luxembourg) (Soviet Union)	Simone Wolter; Olga Morozova	0; 6	1; 6
3	(Luxembourg) (Soviet Union)	Monique Krecke / Simone Wolter; Olga Morozova / Olga Zaitseva	0; 6	0; 6

==== Great Britain vs. Belgium ====
Great Britain
3
RSHE Club Campo, Madrid, Spain
May 1979
Red clay (outdoor)

Belgium
0

			1	2	3
1	(United Kingdom) (Belgium)	Sue Barker; Monique Van Haver	6; 3	11; 9
2	(United Kingdom) (Belgium)	Virginia Wade; Michele Gurdal	4; 6	6; 2	6; 3
3	(United Kingdom) (Belgium)	Sue Barker / Virginia Wade; Michele Gurdal / Monique Van Haver	6; 3	6; 2

==== Czechoslovakia vs. Sweden ====
Czechoslovakia
2
RSHE Club Campo, Madrid, Spain
May 1979
Red clay (outdoor)

Sweden
1

			1	2	3
1	(Czechoslovakia) (Sweden)	Hana Mandlíková; Lena Sandin	6; 3	6; 2
2	(Czechoslovakia) (Sweden)	Regina Maršíková; Helena Anliot	6; 3	6; 1
3	(Czechoslovakia) (Sweden)	Hana Mandlíková / Regina Maršíková; Helena Anliot / Mimmi Wikstedt	6; 3	1; 6	1; 6

==== Netherlands vs. Japan ====
Netherlands
3
RSHE Club Campo, Madrid, Spain
May 1979
Red clay (outdoor)

Japan
0

			1	2	3
1	(Netherlands) (Japan)	Elly Appel; Kiyoko Nomura	6; 0	6; 2
2	(Netherlands) (Japan)	Betty Stöve; Sonoe Yonezawa	3; 6	6; 0	6; 3
3	(Netherlands) (Japan)	Marcella Mesker / Betty Stöve; Fumiko Furuhashi / Kiyoko Nomura	6; 2	6; 4

==== Yugoslavia vs. Australia ====
Yugoslavia
0
RSHE Club Campo, Madrid, Spain
May 1979
Red clay (outdoor)

Australia
3

			1	2	3
1	(Socialist Federal Republic of Yugoslavia) (Australia)	Renata Šašak; Kerry Reid	2; 6	0; 6
2	(Socialist Federal Republic of Yugoslavia) (Australia)	Mima Jaušovec; Dianne Fromholtz	2; 6	7; 5	2; 6
3	(Socialist Federal Republic of Yugoslavia) (Australia)	Renata Šašak / Mima Jaušovec; Kerry Reid / Wendy Turnbull	3; 6	3; 6

=== Quarterfinals ===
==== United States vs. France ====
United States
3
RSHE Club Campo, Madrid, Spain
May 1979
Red clay (outdoor)

France
0

			1	2	3
1	(United States) (France)	Tracy Austin; Frédérique Thibault	6; 4	6; 0
2	(United States) (France)	Chris Evert Lloyd; Brigitte Simon	6; 0	6; 0
3	(United States) (France)	Rosemary Casals / Chris Evert Lloyd; Françoise Dürr / Frédérique Thibault	6; 1	6; 4

==== Switzerland vs. Soviet Union ====
Switzerland
1
RSHE Club Campo, Madrid, Spain
May 1979
Red clay (outdoor)

Soviet Union
2

			1	2	3
1	(Switzerland) (Soviet Union)	Claudia Pasquale; Natasha Chmyreva	1; 6	6; 3	3; 6
2	(Switzerland) (Soviet Union)	Petra Delhees; Olga Morozova	1; 6	6; 2	6; 4
3	(Switzerland) (Soviet Union)	Petra Delhees / Christiane Jolissaint; Natasha Chmyreva / Olga Morozova	1; 6	2; 6

==== Great Britain vs. Czechoslovakia ====
Great Britain
0
RSHE Club Campo, Madrid, Spain
May 1979
Red clay (outdoor)

Czechoslovakia
3

			1	2	3
1	(United Kingdom) (Czechoslovakia)	Sue Barker; Hana Mandlíková	6; 3	6; 8	4; 6
2	(United Kingdom) (Czechoslovakia)	Virginia Wade; Regina Maršíková	8; 10	1; 6
3	(United Kingdom) (Czechoslovakia)	Anne Hobbs / Michelle Tyler; Hana Mandlíková / Renáta Tomanová	6; 8	5; 7

==== Netherlands vs. Australia ====
Netherlands
1
RSHE Club Campo, Madrid, Spain
May 1979
Red clay (outdoor)

Australia
2

			1	2	3
1	(Netherlands) (Australia)	Elly Appel; Wendy Turnbull	2; 6	3; 6
2	(Netherlands) (Australia)	Betty Stöve; Dianne Fromholtz	2; 6	6; 2	3; 6
3	(Netherlands) (Australia)	Marcella Mesker / Betty Stöve; Kerry Reid / Wendy Turnbull	6; 4	9; 7

=== Semifinals ===
==== United States vs. Soviet Union ====
United States
2
RSHE Club Campo, Madrid, Spain
May 1979
Red clay (outdoor)

Soviet Union
0

			1	2	3
1	(United States) (Soviet Union)	Tracy Austin; Natasha Chmyreva	6; 0	6; 1
2	(United States) (Soviet Union)	Chris Evert Lloyd; Olga Morozova	6; 4	8; 6
3	(United States) (Soviet Union)	Rosemary Casals / Billie Jean King; Olga Morozova / Olga Zaitseva				not played

==== Czechoslovakia vs. Australia ====
Czechoslovakia
0
RSHE Club Campo, Madrid, Spain
May 1979
Red clay (outdoor)

Australia
3

			1	2	3
1	(Czechoslovakia) (Australia)	Hana Mandlíková; Kerry Reid	4; 6	3; 6
2	(Czechoslovakia) (Australia)	Regina Maršíková; Dianne Fromholtz	2; 6	6; 1	0; 6
3	(Czechoslovakia) (Australia)	Regina Maršíková / Renáta Tomanová; Kerry Reid / Wendy Turnbull	2; 6	1; 6

=== Final ===
==== United States vs. Australia ====
United States
3
RSHE Club Campo, Madrid, Spain
6 May 1979
Red clay (outdoor)

Australia
0

			1	2	3
1	(United States) (Australia)	Tracy Austin; Kerry Reid	6; 3	6; 0
2	(United States) (Australia)	Chris Evert Lloyd; Dianne Fromholtz	2; 6	6; 3	8; 6
3	(United States) (Australia)	Rosemary Casals / Billie Jean King; Kerry Reid / Wendy Turnbull	3; 6	6; 3	8; 6

1979 Federation Cup Champions
(United States)
United States
Eighth title

== Consolation rounds ==
=== Draw ===
Consolation first round
Mexico	2
Israel	1
Denmark	2
Indonesia	1
Hungary	0
Argentina	3
Spain	2
Norway	1
Thailand	2
Ireland	1
Chinese Taipei	1
Portugal	2
South Korea	2
New Zealand	1

Consolation quarterfinals
Canada	2
Mexico	1
Denmark	0
Argentina	3
Spain	2
Thailand	0
Portugal	0
South Korea	3

Consolation semifinals
Canada	0
Argentina	3
Spain	3
South Korea	0

Consolation final
Argentina	3
Spain	0

=== First round ===
==== Mexico vs. Israel ====
Mexico
2
RSHE Club Campo, Madrid, Spain
April – May 1979
Red clay (outdoor)

Israel
1

		1	2	3
1	(Mexico) (Israel)
2	(Mexico) (Israel)
3	(Mexico) (Israel)

==== Denmark vs. Indonesia ====
Denmark
2
RSHE Club Campo, Madrid, Spain
April – May 1979
Red clay (outdoor)

Indonesia
1

		1	2	3
1	(Denmark) (Indonesia)
2	(Denmark) (Indonesia)
3	(Denmark) (Indonesia)

==== Hungary vs. Argentina ====
Hungary
0
RSHE Club Campo, Madrid, Spain
April – May 1979
Red clay (outdoor)

Argentina
3

			1	2	3
1	(Hungary) (Argentina)	Anna Németh; Emilse Raponi	6; 8	5; 7
2	(Hungary) (Argentina)	Judit Szörényi; Ivanna Madruga Ossès	3; 6	1; 6
3	(Hungary) (Argentina)	Éva Rózsavölgyi / Judit Szörényi; Ivanna Madruga Ossès / Adriana Villagrán Reami	4; 6	4; 6

==== Spain vs. Norway ====
Spain
2
RSHE Club Campo, Madrid, Spain
April – May 1979
Red clay (outdoor)

Norway
1

			1	2	3
1	(Spain) (Norway)	Mónica Álvarez de Mon; Bente Kjolstad	6; 2	6; 1
2	(Spain) (Norway)	Carmen Perea; Ellen Grindvold	6; 4	6; 2
3	(Spain) (Norway)	Vicky Baldovinos / Betona Pellón Fernández; Ellen Grindvold / Bente Kjolstad	4; 6	6; 2	5; 7

==== Thailand vs. Ireland ====
Thailand
2
RSHE Club Campo, Madrid, Spain
April – May 1979
Red clay (outdoor)

Ireland
1

		1	2	3
1	(Thailand) (Republic of Ireland)
2	(Thailand) (Republic of Ireland)
3	(Thailand) (Republic of Ireland)

==== Chinese Taipei vs. Portugal ====
Chinese Taipei
1
RSHE Club Campo, Madrid, Spain
April – May 1979
Red clay (outdoor)

Portugal
2

			1	2	3
1	(Chinese Taipei) (Portugal)	Wen Hsiu-tsuan; Leonora Peralta	6; 2	7^{7} 6^{4}
2	(Chinese Taipei) (Portugal)	Ho Chiu-mei; Deborah Fiúza	4; 6	4; 6
3	(Chinese Taipei) (Portugal)	Ho Chiu-mei / Wen Hsiu-tsuan; Deborah Fiúza / Leonora Peralta	6; 3	5; 7	3; 6

==== South Korea vs. New Zealand ====
South Korea
2
RSHE Club Campo, Madrid, Spain
April – May 1979
Red clay (outdoor)

New Zealand
1

			1	2	3
1	(South Korea) (New Zealand)	Kim Nam-sook; Chris Newton	6; 1	6; 0
2	(South Korea) (New Zealand)	Lee Duk-hee; Brenda Perry	3; 6	6; 4	4; 6
3	(South Korea) (New Zealand)	Kim Nam-sook / Lee Duk-hee; Chris Newton / Brenda Perry	4; 6	6; 3	7; 5

=== Quarterfinals ===
==== Canada vs. Mexico ====
Canada
2
RSHE Club Campo, Madrid, Spain
April – May 1979
Red clay (outdoor)

Mexico
1

		1	2	3
1	(Canada) (Mexico)
2	(Canada) (Mexico)
3	(Canada) (Mexico)

==== Denmark vs. Argentina ====
Denmark
0
RSHE Club Campo, Madrid, Spain
April – May 1979
Red clay (outdoor)

Argentina
3

		1	2	3
1	(Denmark) (Argentina)
2	(Denmark) (Argentina)
3	(Denmark) (Argentina)

==== Spain vs. Thailand ====
Spain
2
RSHE Club Campo, Madrid, Spain
April – May 1979
Red clay (outdoor)

Thailand
0

			1	2	3
1	(Spain) (Thailand)	Mónica Álvarez de Mon; Chalada Wattana	6; 2	4; 6	6; 1
2	(Spain) (Thailand)	Carmen Perea; Suthasini Sirikaya	6; 3	6; 1
3	(Spain) (Thailand)					not played

==== Portugal vs. South Korea ====
Portugal
0
RSHE Club Campo, Madrid, Spain
April – May 1979
Red clay (outdoor)

South Korea
3

			1	2	3
1	(Portugal) (South Korea)	Patrícia Alvarenga; Kim Nam-sook	1; 6	0; 6
2	(Portugal) (South Korea)	Deborah Fiúza; Lee Duk-hee	0; 6	2; 6
3	(Portugal) (South Korea)	Patrícia Alvarenga / Deborah Fiúza; Kim Nam-sook / Lee Soon-oh	2; 6	3; 6

=== Semifinals ===
==== Canada vs. Argentina ====
Canada
0
RSHE Club Campo, Madrid, Spain
April – May 1979
Red clay (outdoor)

Argentina
3

		1	2	3
1	(Canada) (Argentina)
2	(Canada) (Argentina)
3	(Canada) (Argentina)

==== Spain vs. South Korea ====
Spain
3
RSHE Club Campo, Madrid, Spain
April – May 1979
Red clay (outdoor)

South Korea
0

			1	2	3
1	(Spain) (South Korea)	Mónica Álvarez de Mon; Kim Nam-sook	7; 5	6; 3
2	(Spain) (South Korea)	Carmen Perea; Lee Duk-hee	2; 6	6; 3	6; 3
3	(Spain) (South Korea)	Betona Pellón Fernández / Carmen Perea; Kim Nam-sook / Lee Soon-oh	6; 4	6; 2

=== Final ===
==== Argentina vs. Spain ====
Argentina
3
RSHE Club Campo, Madrid, Spain
April – May 1979
Red clay (outdoor)

Spain
0

			1	2	3
1	(Argentina) (Spain)	Emilse Raponi; Carmen Perea	6; 0	5; 7	6; 4
2	(Argentina) (Spain)	Adriana Villagrán Reami; Mónica Álvarez de Mon	6; 1	6; 3
3	(Argentina) (Spain)	Emilse Raponi / Adriana Villagrán Reami; Betona Pellón Fernández / Carmen Perea	6; 4	7; 5
