= 1984 Federation Cup (tennis) =

International women's tennis competition

Details
- Duration: 15–22 July
- Edition: 22nd

Champion
- Winning nation: Czechoslovakia

The 1984 Federation Cup was the 22nd edition of the most important competition between national teams in women's tennis. The tournament was held at the Esporte Clube Pinheiros in São Paulo, Brazil, from 15 to 22 July. Czechoslovakia successfully defended their title, defeating Australia in the final.

== Qualifying round ==
All ties were played at the Esporte Clube Pinheiros in São Paulo, Brazil, on clay courts.

Winning team	Score	Losing team
South Korea	3–0	Zimbabwe
Chile	3–0	Philippines
Colombia	2–1	Indonesia
Venezuela	3–0	Portugal

Winning nations advance to Main Draw, losing nations play in consolation rounds.

=== South Korea vs. Zimbabwe ===
South Korea
3
Esporte Clube Pinheiros, São Paulo, Brazil
July 1984
Red clay (outdoor)

Zimbabwe
0

			1	2	3
1	(South Korea) (Zimbabwe)	Han Eun-sook; Sally-Anne McDonald	7; 5	6; 0
2	(South Korea) (Zimbabwe)	Helen Park; Angela Longo	6; 0	6; 2
3	(South Korea) (Zimbabwe)	Han Eun-sook / Lee Jeong-soon; Sally-Anne McDonald / Lindsay Standen	6; 0	6; 0

=== Chile vs. Philippines ===
Chile
3
Esporte Clube Pinheiros, São Paulo, Brazil
July 1984
Red clay (outdoor)

Philippines
0

			1	2	3
1	(Chile) (Philippines)	Paulina Sepúlveda; Rina Caniza	6; 2	6; 1
2	(Chile) (Philippines)	Carolina Espinoza; Dyan Castillejo	2; 6	6; 4	6; 4
3	(Chile) (Philippines)	Patricia Hermeda / Germaine Ohaco; Rina Caniza / Dyan Castillejo	7; 5	6; 1

=== Colombia vs. Indonesia ===
Colombia
2
Esporte Clube Pinheiros, São Paulo, Brazil
July 1984
Red clay (outdoor)

Indonesia
1

			1	2	3
1	(Colombia) (Indonesia)	Liliana Fernández; Sri Utaminingsih	6; 4	4; 6	7; 5
2	(Colombia) (Indonesia)	Elsa Rodríguez; Suzanna Anggarkusuma	7; 5	6; 1
3	(Colombia) (Indonesia)	Gloria Escobar / Liliana Fernández; Suzanna Anggarkusuma / Sri Utaminingsih	2; 6	1; 6

=== Venezuela vs. Portugal ===
Venezuela
3
Esporte Clube Pinheiros, São Paulo, Brazil
July 1984
Red clay (outdoor)

Portugal
0

			1	2	3
1	(Venezuela) (Portugal)	Claudia Borgiani; Marta Varanda	6; 2	6; 2
2	(Venezuela) (Portugal)	Stefania Sernaglia; Fátima Santiago	7; 5	6; 2
3	(Venezuela) (Portugal)	Claudia Borgiani / Stefania Sernaglia; Fátima Santiago / Marta Varanda	6; 3	6; 4

== Main draw ==
Participating Teams
Argentina	Australia	Austria	Belgium	Brazil	Bulgaria	Canada	Chile
China	Colombia	Czechoslovakia	Denmark	France	Great Britain	Greece	Hungary
Israel	Italy	Japan	Mexico	Netherlands	Peru	South Korea	Soviet Union
Spain	Sweden	Switzerland	United States	Uruguay	Venezuela	West Germany	Yugoslavia

First Round
Czechoslovakia	3
Q	Venezuela	0
Japan	1
Greece	2
France	2
Netherlands	1
Denmark	2
Q	Chile	1
Yugoslavia	3
Q	South Korea	0
Israel	3
Peru	0
Soviet Union	3
Uruguay	0
Bulgaria	3
Great Britain	0
United States	3
Mexico	0
Hungary	1
Switzerland	2
Spain	0
Austria	3
Canada	1
Italy	2
Australia	3
Argentina	0
Q	Colombia	1
Belgium	2
Sweden	2
Brazil	1
China	0
West Germany	3

Second Round
Czechoslovakia	3
Greece	0
France	3
Denmark	0
Yugoslavia	3
Israel	0
Soviet Union	1
Bulgaria	2
United States	2
Switzerland	1
Austria	0
Italy	2
Australia	3
Belgium	0
Sweden	1
West Germany	2

Quarterfinals
Czechoslovakia	3
France	0
Yugoslavia	2
Bulgaria	1
United States	2
Italy	1
Australia	2
West Germany	1

Semifinals
Czechoslovakia	3
Yugoslavia	0
United States	1
Australia	2

Final
Czechoslovakia	2
Australia	1

1st Round losing teams play in consolation rounds

=== First round ===
==== Czechoslovakia vs. Venezuela ====
Czechoslovakia
3
Esporte Clube Pinheiros, São Paulo, Brazil
July 1984
Red clay (outdoor)

Venezuela
0

			1	2	3
1	(Czechoslovakia) (Venezuela)	Helena Suková; Claudia Borgiani	6; 3	6; 2
2	(Czechoslovakia) (Venezuela)	Hana Mandlíková; Stefania Sernaglia	6; 0	6; 2
3	(Czechoslovakia) (Venezuela)	Iva Budařová / Marcela Skuherská; Claudia Borgiani / Stefania Sernaglia	6; 1	6; 0

==== Japan vs. Greece ====
Japan
1
Esporte Clube Pinheiros, São Paulo, Brazil
July 1984
Red clay (outdoor)

Greece
2

			1	2	3
1	(Japan) (Greece)	Emiko Okagawa; Olga Tsarbopoulou	6; 2	6; 7	0; 6
2	(Japan) (Greece)	Etsuko Inoue; Angeliki Kanellopoulou	4; 6	2; 6
3	(Japan) (Greece)	Etsuko Inoue / Masako Yanagi; Angeliki Kanellopoulou / Olga Tsarbopoulou	6; 1	6; 1

==== France vs. Netherlands ====
France
2
Esporte Clube Pinheiros, São Paulo, Brazil
July 1984
Red clay (outdoor)

Netherlands
1

			1	2	3
1	(France) (Netherlands)	Marie-Christine Calleja; Karin Moos	6; 2	5; 7	3; 6
2	(France) (Netherlands)	Catherine Tanvier; Simone Schilder	6; 2	6; 3
3	(France) (Netherlands)	Catherine Suire / Catherine Tanvier; Digna Ketelaar / Simone Schilder	6; 3	6; 1

==== Denmark vs. Chile ====
Denmark
2
Esporte Clube Pinheiros, São Paulo, Brazil
July 1984
Red clay (outdoor)

Chile
1

			1	2	3
1	(Denmark) (Chile)	Therese Arildsen; Paulina Sepúlveda	1; 6	7; 5	3; 6
2	(Denmark) (Chile)	Tine Scheuer-Larsen; Carolina Espinoza	2; 6	6; 3	6; 2
3	(Denmark) (Chile)	Anne Møller / Tine Scheuer-Larsen; Patricia Hermeda / Germaine Ohaco	6; 4	6; 3

==== Yugoslavia vs. South Korea ====
Yugoslavia
3
Esporte Clube Pinheiros, São Paulo, Brazil
July 1984
Red clay (outdoor)

South Korea
0

			1	2	3
1	(Socialist Federal Republic of Yugoslavia) (South Korea)	Sabrina Goleš; Sol Min-kyung	6; 0	6; 3
2	(Socialist Federal Republic of Yugoslavia) (South Korea)	Mima Jaušovec; Helen Park	6; 2	6; 2
3	(Socialist Federal Republic of Yugoslavia) (South Korea)	Mima Jaušovec / Renata Šašak; Han Eun-sook / Lee Jeong-soon	7; 6	5; 7	6; 2

==== Israel vs. Peru ====
Israel
3
Esporte Clube Pinheiros, São Paulo, Brazil
July 1984
Red clay (outdoor)

Peru
0

			1	2	3
1	(Israel) (Peru)	Rafeket Binyamini; Marlene Chumbez	6; 2	6; 2
2	(Israel) (Peru)	Orly Bialistozky; Magdalena Wiese	6; 3	6; 1
3	(Israel) (Peru)	Orly Bialistozky / Sagit Doron; Marlene Chumbez / Magdalena Wiese	6; 2	6; 3

==== Soviet Union vs. Uruguay ====
Soviet Union
3
Esporte Clube Pinheiros, São Paulo, Brazil
July 1984
Red clay (outdoor)

Uruguay
0

			1	2	3
1	(Soviet Union) (Uruguay)	Svetlana Cherneva; María José Olave	6; 0	6; 1
2	(Soviet Union) (Uruguay)	Natasha Reva; Marta María Gallinal	6; 1	6; 1
3	(Soviet Union) (Uruguay)	Svetlana Cherneva / Natasha Reva; Mariela Clavijo / Claudia van der Weck	6; 0	6; 1

==== Bulgaria vs. Great Britain ====
Bulgaria
3
Esporte Clube Pinheiros, São Paulo, Brazil
July 1984
Red clay (outdoor)

Great Britain
0

			1	2	3
1	(Bulgaria) (United Kingdom)	Katerina Maleeva; Anne Hobbs	6; 4	3; 6	6; 2
2	(Bulgaria) (United Kingdom)	Manuela Maleeva; Jo Durie	6; 4	4; 6	6; 4
3	(Bulgaria) (United Kingdom)	Katerina Maleeva / Manuela Maleeva; Amanda Brown / Anne Hobbs	7; 6	7; 5

==== United States vs. Mexico ====
United States
3
Esporte Clube Pinheiros, São Paulo, Brazil
July 1984
Red clay (outdoor)

Mexico
0

			1	2	3
1	(United States) (Mexico)	Kathy Horvath; Claudia Hernández	1; 6	6; 4	6; 3
2	(United States) (Mexico)	Kathy Jordan; Heliane Steden	6; 2	6; 4
3	(United States) (Mexico)	Kathy Jordan / Anne Smith; Claudia Hernández / Alejandra Vallejo	6; 3	6; 0

==== Hungary vs. Switzerland ====
Hungary
1
Esporte Clube Pinheiros, São Paulo, Brazil
July 1984
Red clay (outdoor)

Switzerland
2

			1	2	3
1	(Hungary) (Switzerland)	Andrea Ritecz; Lilian Drescher	2; 6	0; 6
2	(Hungary) (Switzerland)	Andrea Temesvári; Christiane Jolissaint	6; 2	6; 4
3	(Hungary) (Switzerland)	Éva Rózsavölgyi / Andrea Temesvári; Lilian Drescher / Christiane Jolissaint	1; 6	2; 6

==== Spain vs. Austria ====
Spain
0
Pinheiros Sports Club, São Paulo, Brazil
July 1984
Red clay (outdoor)

Austria
3

			1	2	3
1	(Spain) (Austria)	Ana Almansa; Judith Wiesner	2; 6	1; 6
2	(Spain) (Austria)	Betona Pellón Fernández; Petra Huber	1; 6	7; 6	3; 6
3	(Spain) (Austria)	Ana Almansa / Betona Pellón Fernández; Petra Huber / Judith Wiesner	4; 6	1; 6

==== Canada vs. Italy ====
Canada
1
Esporte Clube Pinheiros, São Paulo, Brazil
July 1984
Red clay (outdoor)

Italy
2

			1	2	3
1	(Canada) (Italy)	Marianne Groat; Sandra Cecchini	5; 7	2; 6
2	(Canada) (Italy)	Jill Hetherington; Raffaella Reggi	1; 6	2; 6
3	(Canada) (Italy)	Jill Hetherington / Hélène Pelletier; Raffaella Reggi / Sabina Simmonds	7; 6	6; 3

==== Australia vs. Argentina ====
Australia
3
Esporte Clube Pinheiros, São Paulo, Brazil
July 1984
Red clay (outdoor)

Argentina
0

			1	2	3
1	(Australia) (Argentina)	Elizabeth Minter; Emilse Raponi-Longo	2; 6	6; 4	6; 0
2	(Australia) (Argentina)	Elizabeth Sayers; Ivanna Madruga Ossès	4; 6	7; 5	6; 4
3	(Australia) (Argentina)	Anne Minter / Elizabeth Minter; Emilse Raponi-Longo / Gabriela Sabatini	6; 1	6; 2

==== Colombia vs. Belgium ====
Colombia
1
Esporte Clube Pinheiros, São Paulo, Brazil
July 1984
Red clay (outdoor)

Belgium
2

			1	2	3
1	(Colombia) (Belgium)	Liliana Fernández; Nicole Mabille	5; 7	0; 6
2	(Colombia) (Belgium)	Elsa Rodríguez; Ann Gabriel	6; 4	6; 4
3	(Colombia) (Belgium)	Liliana Fernández / Elsa Rodríguez; Nicole Mabille / Kathleen Schuurmans	2; 6	4; 6

==== Brazil vs. Sweden ====
Brazil
1
Esporte Clube Pinheiros, São Paulo, Brazil
July 1984
Red clay (outdoor)

Sweden
2

			1	2	3
1	(Brazil) (Sweden)	Cláudia Monteiro; Carina Karlsson	4; 6	4; 6
2	(Brazil) (Sweden)	Patricia Medrado; Catarina Lindqvist	5; 7	1; 6
3	(Brazil) (Sweden)	Patricia Medrado / Cláudia Monteiro; Catrin Jexell / Carina Karlsson	6; 2	6; 4

==== China vs. West Germany ====
China
0
Esporte Clube Pinheiros, São Paulo, Brazil
July 1984
Red clay (outdoor)

West Germany
3

			1	2	3
1	(China) (West Germany)	Zhong Ni; Myriam Schropp	6; 3	3; 6	3; 6
2	(China) (West Germany)	Wang Ping; Sylvia Hanika	1; 6	0; 6
3	(China) (West Germany)	Duan Li-Lan / Zhu Xiao-Yu; Sylvia Hanika / Petra Keppeler	1; 6	4; 6

=== Second round ===
==== Czechoslovakia vs. Greece ====
Czechoslovakia
3
Esporte Clube Pinheiros, São Paulo, Brazil
July 1984
Red clay (outdoor)

Greece
0

			1	2	3
1	(Czechoslovakia) (Greece)	Helena Suková; Olga Tsarbopoulou	7; 5	7; 5
2	(Czechoslovakia) (Greece)	Hana Mandlíková; Angeliki Kanellopoulou	6; 1	7; 5
3	(Czechoslovakia) (Greece)	Iva Budařová / Marcela Skuherská; Angeliki Kanellopoulou / Olga Tsarbopoulou	7; 5	6; 3

==== France vs. Denmark ====
France
3
Esporte Clube Pinheiros, São Paulo, Brazil
July 1984
Red clay (outdoor)

Denmark
0

			1	2	3
1	(France) (Denmark)	Marie-Christine Calleja; Therese Arildsen	6; 3	6; 2
2	(France) (Denmark)	Catherine Tanvier; Tine Scheuer-Larsen	6; 4	6; 4
3	(France) (Denmark)	Catherine Suire / Catherine Tanvier; Anne Møller / Tine Scheuer-Larsen	6; 4	6; 4

==== Yugoslavia vs. Israel ====
Yugoslavia
3
Esporte Clube Pinheiros, São Paulo, Brazil
July 1984
Red clay (outdoor)

Israel
0

			1	2	3
1	(Socialist Federal Republic of Yugoslavia) (Israel)	Sabrina Goleš; Rafeket Binyamini	6; 1	6; 0
2	(Socialist Federal Republic of Yugoslavia) (Israel)	Mima Jaušovec; Orly Bialistozky	6; 2	6; 3
3	(Socialist Federal Republic of Yugoslavia) (Israel)	Sabrina Goleš / Renata Šašak; Orly Bialistozky / Sagit Doron	6; 4	6; 0

==== Soviet Union vs. Bulgaria ====
Soviet Union
1
Esporte Clube Pinheiros, São Paulo, Brazil
July 1984
Red clay (outdoor)

Bulgaria
2

			1	2	3
1	(Soviet Union) (Bulgaria)	Svetlana Cherneva; Katerina Maleeva	6; 7	3; 6
2	(Soviet Union) (Bulgaria)	Natasha Reva; Manuela Maleeva	2; 6	0; 6
3	(Soviet Union) (Bulgaria)	Elena Eliseenko / Larisa Savchenko; Katerina Maleeva / Manuela Maleeva	5; 7	7; 5	6; 1

==== United States vs. Switzerland ====
United States
2
Esporte Clube Pinheiros, São Paulo, Brazil
July 1984
Red clay (outdoor)

Switzerland
1

			1	2	3
1	(United States) (Switzerland)	Kathy Horvath; Lilian Drescher	2; 6	6; 3	6; 3
2	(United States) (Switzerland)	Kathy Jordan; Christiane Jolissaint	6; 2	4; 6	3; 6
3	(United States) (Switzerland)	Kathy Jordan / Anne Smith; Lilian Drescher / Christiane Jolissaint	6; 4	6; 3

==== Austria vs. Italy ====
Austria
0
Esporte Clube Pinheiros, São Paulo, Brazil
July 1984
Red clay (outdoor)

Italy
2

			1	2	3
1	(Austria) (Italy)	Judith Wiesner; Sandra Cecchini	6; 2	4; 6	2; 6
2	(Austria) (Italy)	Petra Huber; Raffaella Reggi	2; 6	7; 5	4; 6
3	(Austria) (Italy)					not played

==== Australia vs. Belgium ====
Australia
3
Esporte Clube Pinheiros, São Paulo, Brazil
July 1984
Red clay (outdoor)

Belgium
0

			1	2	3
1	(Australia) (Belgium)	Elizabeth Minter; Kathleen Schuurmans	7; 5	6; 2
2	(Australia) (Belgium)	Elizabeth Sayers; Nicole Mabille	4; 6	6; 4	6; 1
3	(Australia) (Belgium)	Anne Minter / Elizabeth Minter; Nicole Mabille / Kathleen Schuurmans	6; 3	6; 3

==== Sweden vs. West Germany ====
Sweden
1
Esporte Clube Pinheiros, São Paulo, Brazil
July 1984
Red clay (outdoor)

West Germany
2

			1	2	3
1	(Sweden) (West Germany)	Carina Karlsson; Petra Keppeler	4; 6	6; 3	1; 6
2	(Sweden) (West Germany)	Catarina Lindqvist; Sylvia Hanika	6; 4	3; 6	6; 2
3	(Sweden) (West Germany)	Catrin Jexell / Carina Karlsson; Sylvia Hanika / Petra Keppeler	3; 6	4; 6

=== Quarterfinals ===
==== Czechoslovakia vs. France ====
Czechoslovakia
3
Esporte Clube Pinheiros, São Paulo, Brazil
July 1984
Red clay (outdoor)

France
0

			1	2	3
1	(Czechoslovakia) (France)	Helena Suková; Marie-Christine Calleja	6; 4	6; 1
2	(Czechoslovakia) (France)	Hana Mandlíková; Catherine Tanvier	6; 3	6; 4
3	(Czechoslovakia) (France)	Iva Budařová / Marcela Skuherská; Catherine Suire / Catherine Tanvier	4; 6	6; 1	6; 3

==== Yugoslavia vs. Bulgaria ====
Yugoslavia
2
Esporte Clube Pinheiros, São Paulo, Brazil
July 1984
Red clay (outdoor)

Bulgaria
1

			1	2	3
1	(Socialist Federal Republic of Yugoslavia) (Bulgaria)	Sabrina Goleš; Katerina Maleeva	6; 4	7; 5
2	(Socialist Federal Republic of Yugoslavia) (Bulgaria)	Mima Jaušovec; Manuela Maleeva	6; 3	3; 6	1; 6
3	(Socialist Federal Republic of Yugoslavia) (Bulgaria)	Sabrina Goleš / Mima Jaušovec; Katerina Maleeva / Manuela Maleeva	6; 3	6; 1

==== United States vs. Italy ====
United States
2
Esporte Clube Pinheiros, São Paulo, Brazil
July 1984
Red clay (outdoor)

Italy
1

			1	2	3
1	(United States) (Italy)	Kathy Horvath; Sandra Cecchini	6; 3	7; 5
2	(United States) (Italy)	Zina Garrison; Raffaella Reggi	2; 6	5; 7
3	(United States) (Italy)	Kathy Jordan / Anne Smith; Sandra Cecchini / Raffaella Reggi	6; 3	6; 1

==== Australia vs. West Germany ====
Australia
2
Esporte Clube Pinheiros, São Paulo, Brazil
July 1984
Red clay (outdoor)

West Germany
1

			1	2	3
1	(Australia) (West Germany)	Anne Minter; Petra Keppeler	6; 4	6; 4
2	(Australia) (West Germany)	Elizabeth Sayers; Sylvia Hanika	4; 6	1; 6
3	(Australia) (West Germany)	Elizabeth Sayers / Wendy Turnbull; Sylvia Hanika / Petra Keppeler	6; 1	6; 1

=== Semifinals ===
==== Czechoslovakia vs. Yugoslavia ====
Czechoslovakia
3
Esporte Clube Pinheiros, São Paulo, Brazil
July 1984
Red clay (outdoor)

Yugoslavia
0

			1	2	3
1	(Czechoslovakia) (Socialist Federal Republic of Yugoslavia)	Helena Suková; Sabrina Goleš	2; 6	6; 1	7; 5
2	(Czechoslovakia) (Socialist Federal Republic of Yugoslavia)	Hana Mandlíková; Mima Jaušovec	2; 6	6; 3	6; 4
3	(Czechoslovakia) (Socialist Federal Republic of Yugoslavia)	Iva Budařová / Marcela Skuherská; Mima Jaušovec / Renata Šašak	6; 4	4; 6	6; 4

==== United States vs. Australia ====
United States
1
Esporte Clube Pinheiros, São Paulo, Brazil
July 1984
Red clay (outdoor)

Australia
2

			1	2	3
1	(United States) (Australia)	Kathy Horvath; Anne Minter	3; 6	4; 6
2	(United States) (Australia)	Kathy Jordan; Wendy Turnbull	6; 3	7; 6
3	(United States) (Australia)	Kathy Jordan / Anne Smith; Elizabeth Sayers / Wendy Turnbull	6; 7	4; 6

=== Final ===
==== Czechoslovakia vs. Australia ====
Czechoslovakia
2
Esporte Clube Pinheiros, São Paulo, Brazil
22 July 1984
Red clay (outdoor)

Australia
1

			1	2	3
1	(Czechoslovakia) (Australia)	Helena Suková; Anne Minter	5; 7	5; 7
2	(Czechoslovakia) (Australia)	Hana Mandlíková; Elizabeth Sayers	6; 1	6; 0
3	(Czechoslovakia) (Australia)	Hana Mandlíková / Helena Suková; Elizabeth Sayers / Wendy Turnbull	6; 2	6; 2

1984 Federation Cup Champions
(Czechoslovakia)
Czechoslovakia
Third title

== Consolation rounds ==
=== Draw ===
Consolation first round
Indonesia	3
Zimbabwe	0
Hungary	2
South Korea	1
Portugal	0
Venezuela	3
Peru	2
Uruguay	1

Consolation second round
Indonesia	0
Netherlands	3
Brazil	3
Colombia	0
Canada	3
Chile	0
Great Britain	2
Hungary	1
Venezuela	0
Argentina	3
Spain	1
China	2
Japan	3
Philippines	0
Mexico	3
Peru	0

Consolation quarterfinals
Netherlands	1
Brazil	2
Canada	1
Great Britain	2
Argentina	2
China	0
Japan	2
Mexico	1

Consolation semifinals
Brazil	2
Great Britain	1
Argentina	w/o
Japan

Consolation final
Brazil	1
Japan	2

=== First round ===
==== Indonesia vs. Zimbabwe ====
Indonesia
3
Esporte Clube Pinheiros, São Paulo, Brazil
July 1984
Red clay (outdoor)

Zimbabwe
0

			1	2	3
1	(Indonesia) (Zimbabwe)	Sri Utaminingsih; Sally-Anne McDonald	6; 3	6; 3
2	(Indonesia) (Zimbabwe)	Suzanna Anggarkusuma; Angela Longo	6; 3	6; 4
3	(Indonesia) (Zimbabwe)	Suzanna Anggarkusuma / Sri Utaminingsih; Angela Longo / Sue Roux	6; 3	6; 1

==== Hungary vs. South Korea ====
Hungary
2
Esporte Clube Pinheiros, São Paulo, Brazil
July 1984
Red clay (outdoor)

South Korea
1

			1	2	3
1	(Hungary) (South Korea)	Andrea Ritecz; Lee Jeong-soon	3; 6	2; 6
2	(Hungary) (South Korea)	Andrea Temesvári; Helen Park	6; 1	6; 3
3	(Hungary) (South Korea)	Andrea Ritecz / Andrea Temesvári; Han Eun-sook / Lee Jeong-soon	6; 4	3; 6	6; 3

==== Portugal vs. Venezuela ====
Portugal
0
Esporte Clube Pinheiros, São Paulo, Brazil
July 1984
Red clay (outdoor)

Venezuela
3

			1	2	3
1	(Portugal) (Venezuela)	Marta Varanda; Claudia Borgiani	0; 6	0; 6
2	(Portugal) (Venezuela)	Fátima Santiago; Stefania Sernaglia	2; 6	2; 6
3	(Portugal) (Venezuela)	Fátima Santiago / Marta Varanda; Claudia Borgiani / Henriette Gemer	2; 6	0; 6

==== Peru vs. Uruguay ====
Peru
2
Esporte Clube Pinheiros, São Paulo, Brazil
July 1984
Red clay (outdoor)

Uruguay
1

			1	2	3
1	(Peru) (Uruguay)	Marlene Chumbez; María José Olave	6; 4	6; 7	4; 6
2	(Peru) (Uruguay)	Magdalena Wiese; Marta María Gallinal	6; 3	6; 2
3	(Peru) (Uruguay)	Marlene Chumbez / Magdalena Wiese; Mariela Clavijo / Claudia van der Weck	6; 0	6; 4

=== Second round ===
==== Indonesia vs. Netherlands ====
Indonesia
0
Esporte Clube Pinheiros, São Paulo, Brazil
July 1984
Red clay (outdoor)

Netherlands
3

			1	2	3
1	(Indonesia) (Netherlands)	Sri Utaminingsih; Karin Moos	4; 6	3; 6
2	(Indonesia) (Netherlands)	Suzanna Anggarkusuma; Simone Schilder	2; 6	4; 6
3	(Indonesia) (Netherlands)	Suzanna Anggarkusuma / Sri Utaminingsih; Digna Ketelaar / Karin Moos	4; 6	6; 4	1; 6

==== Brazil vs. Colombia ====
Brazil
3
Esporte Clube Pinheiros, São Paulo, Brazil
July 1984
Red clay (outdoor)

Colombia
0

			1	2	3
1	(Brazil) (Colombia)	Silvana Campos; Gloria Escobar	6; 2	6; 1
2	(Brazil) (Colombia)	Patricia Medrado; Elsa Rodríguez	6; 2	6; 1
3	(Brazil) (Colombia)	Patricia Medrado / Cláudia Monteiro; Liliana Fernández / Elsa Rodríguez	6; 3	6; 2

==== Canada vs. Chile ====
Canada
3
Esporte Clube Pinheiros, São Paulo, Brazil
July 1984
Red clay (outdoor)

Chile
0

			1	2	3
1	(Canada) (Chile)	Marianne Groat; Paulina Sepúlveda	7; 6	6; 1
2	(Canada) (Chile)	Hélène Pelletier; Carolina Espinoza	6; 1	6; 4
3	(Canada) (Chile)	Karen Dewis / Hélène Pelletier; Patricia Hermeda / Germaine Ohaco	1; 6	6; 1	8; 6

==== Great Britain vs. Hungary ====
Great Britain
2
Esporte Clube Pinheiros, São Paulo, Brazil
July 1984
Red clay (outdoor)

Hungary
1

			1	2	3
1	(United Kingdom) (Hungary)	Amanda Brown; Éva Rózsavölgyi	6; 4	6; 3
2	(United Kingdom) (Hungary)	Anne Hobbs; Andrea Ritecz	2; 6	6; 7
3	(United Kingdom) (Hungary)	Amanda Brown / Jo Durie; Andrea Ritecz / Éva Rózsavölgyi	6; 2	7; 5

==== Venezuela vs. Argentina ====
Venezuela
0
Esporte Clube Pinheiros, São Paulo, Brazil
July 1984
Red clay (outdoor)

Argentina
3

			1	2	3
1	(Venezuela) (Argentina)	Claudia Borgiani; Gabriela Sabatini	1; 6	1; 6
2	(Venezuela) (Argentina)	Stefania Sernaglia; Emilse Raponi-Longo	3; 6	1; 6
3	(Venezuela) (Argentina)	Claudia Borgiani / Henriette Gemer; Emilse Raponi-Longo / Gabriela Sabatini	2; 6	2; 6

==== Spain vs. China ====
Spain
1
Esporte Clube Pinheiros, São Paulo, Brazil
July 1984
Red clay (outdoor)

China
2

			1	2	3
1	(Spain) (China)	Michelle Garth; Zhong Ni	3; 6	1; 6
2	(Spain) (China)	Betona Pellón Fernández; Wang Ping	6; 1	3; 6	6; 0
3	(Spain) (China)	Ana Almansa / Betona Pellón Fernández; Duan Li-Lan / Zhong Ni	7; 6	1; 6	0; 6

==== Japan vs. Philippines ====
Japan
2
Esporte Clube Pinheiros, São Paulo, Brazil
July 1984
Red clay (outdoor)

Philippines
1

			1	2	3
1	(Japan) (Philippines)	Akiko Kijimuta; Rina Caniza	6; 0	6; 1
2	(Japan) (Philippines)	Etsuko Inoue; Dyan Castillejo	6; 2	6; 2
3	(Japan) (Philippines)	Emiko Okagawa / Masako Yanagi; Rina Caniza / Dyan Castillejo	6; 2	6; 2

==== Mexico vs. Peru ====
Mexico
3
Esporte Clube Pinheiros, São Paulo, Brazil
July 1984
Red clay (outdoor)

Peru
0

			1	2	3
1	(Mexico) (Peru)	Claudia Hernández; Marlene Chumbez	6; 2	6; 1
2	(Mexico) (Peru)	Heliane Steden; Magdalena Wiese	6; 2	6; 4
3	(Mexico) (Peru)	Claudia Hernández / Alejandra Vallejo; Marlene Chumbez / Magdalena Wiese	6; 4	4; 6	6; 4

=== Quarterfinals ===
==== Netherlands vs. Brazil ====
Netherlands
1
Esporte Clube Pinheiros, São Paulo, Brazil
July 1984
Red clay (outdoor)

Brazil
2

			1	2	3
1	(Netherlands) (Brazil)	Karin Moos; Silvana Campos	2; 6	3; 6
2	(Netherlands) (Brazil)	Simone Schilder; Patricia Medrado	2; 6	6; 4	3; 6
3	(Netherlands) (Brazil)	Digna Ketelaar / Karin Moos; Silvana Campos / Luciana Corsato	4; 6	6; 2	6; 3

==== Canada vs. Great Britain ====
Canada
1
Esporte Clube Pinheiros, São Paulo, Brazil
July 1984
Red clay (outdoor)

Great Britain
2

			1	2	3
1	(Canada) (United Kingdom)	Karen Dewis; Amanda Brown	4; 4	2; 3
2	(Canada) (United Kingdom)	Hélène Pelletier; Anne Hobbs	7; 5	2; 6	6; 4
3	(Canada) (United Kingdom)	Jill Hetherington / Hélène Pelletier; Amanda Brown / Jo Durie	6; 7	2; 6

==== Argentina vs. China ====
Argentina
2
Esporte Clube Pinheiros, São Paulo, Brazil
July 1984
Red clay (outdoor)

China
0

			1	2	3
1	(Argentina) (China)	Gabriela Sabatini; Duan Li-Lan	7; 5	6; 1
2	(Argentina) (China)	Emilse Raponi-Longo; Zhong Ni	7; 6	4; 6	6; 4
3	(Argentina) (China)					not played

==== Japan vs. Mexico ====
Japan
2
Esporte Clube Pinheiros, São Paulo, Brazil
July 1984
Red clay (outdoor)

Mexico
1

			1	2	3
1	(Japan) (Mexico)	Akiko Kijimuta; Claudia Hernández	2; 6	0; 6
2	(Japan) (Mexico)	Etsuko Inoue; Heliane Steden	3; 6	6; 1	6; 3
3	(Japan) (Mexico)	Etsuko Inoue / Masako Yanagi; Claudia Hernández / Alejandra Vallejo	6; 3	6; 4

=== Semifinals ===
==== Brazil vs. Great Britain ====
Brazil
1
Esporte Clube Pinheiros, São Paulo, Brazil
July 1984
Red clay (outdoor)

Great Britain
2

			1	2	3
1	(Brazil) (United Kingdom)	Silvana Campos; Amanda Brown	4; 6	5; 7
2	(Brazil) (United Kingdom)	Patricia Medrado; Jo Durie	6; 3	6; 1
3	(Brazil) (United Kingdom)	Patricia Medrado / Cláudia Monteiro; Amanda Brown / Anne Hobbs	5; 7	5; 7

=== Final ===
==== Brazil vs. Japan ====
Brazil
1
Esporte Clube Pinheiros, São Paulo, Brazil
July 1984
Red clay (outdoor)

Japan
2

			1	2	3
1	(Brazil) (Japan)	Silvana Campos; Masako Yanagi	0; 6	6; 4	6; 3
2	(Brazil) (Japan)	Patricia Medrado; Etsuko Inoue	4; 6	6; 2	3; 6
3	(Brazil) (Japan)	Patricia Medrado / Cláudia Monteiro; Etsuko Inoue / Masako Yanagi	7; 6	2; 6	6; 8
