= 1982 French Open – Women's singles qualifying =

Women's singles qualifying
- 1982 French Open

Events
Singles	men	women		boys	girls
Doubles	men	women	mixed	boys	girls
WC Singles	men	women	quad
WC Doubles	men	women	quad
Legends	−45	45+	women
← 1980 ·	French Open	· 1983 →

Players who neither had high enough rankings nor received wild cards to enter the main draw of the annual French Open Tennis Championships participated in a qualifying tournament held in the week before the event.

== Qualifiers ==
1. (United States) Beth Herr
2. (Czechoslovakia) Michaela Pazderová
3. (France) Pascale Paradis
4. (West Germany) Cornelia Dries
5. (United States) Nancy Neviaser
6. (Bulgaria) Manuela Maleeva
7. (Belgium) Ann Gabriel
8. (United Kingdom) Elizabeth Jones

== Lucky losers ==
1. (United States) Dana Gilbert
2. (United States) Michelle Torres

== Qualifying draw ==
=== Key ===
- Q = Qualifier
- WC = Wild card
- LL = Lucky loser
- Alt = Alternate
- ITF = ITF entry
- PR = Protected ranking
- SR = Special ranking
- SE = Special exempt
- JE = Junior exempt
- JR = Junior Accelerator Programme entrant
- CO = College Accelerator Programme entrant
- NG = Next Gen Accelerator Program entrant
- w/o = Walkover
- r = Retired
- d = Defaulted

=== First qualifier ===
First round
1	(United States) Michelle Torres	6	6
8	(United States) Donna Rubin	4	2
4	(Spain) Carmen Perea	6	7
5	(Netherlands) Nanette Schutte	2	6
2	(France) Catherine Suire	6	6
7	(Sweden) Elisabeth Ekblom	4	4
3	(United States) Beth Herr	6	6
6	(West Germany) Helga Lütten	2	3

Second round
(United States) Michelle Torres	6	7
(Spain) Carmen Perea	4	6
(France) Catherine Suire	7	4	3
(United States) Beth Herr	5	6	6

Qualifying competition
(United States) Michelle Torres	3	1
(United States) Beth Herr	6	6

=== Second qualifier ===
First round
1	(Czechoslovakia) Michaela Pazderová	1	6	6
8	(United States) Barbie Bramblett	6	4	3
4	(Italy) Raffaella Reggi	6	6
5	(Sweden) Mimmi Wikstedt	2	4
2	(Australia) Pam Whytcross	6	6
7	(United States) Susan Rimes	1	0
3	(Sweden) Catarina Lindqvist	6	6
6	(Austria) Andrea Pesak	4	3

Second round
(Czechoslovakia) Michaela Pazderová	6	6
(Italy) Raffaella Reggi	3	2
(Australia) Pam Whytcross	2	1
(Sweden) Catarina Lindqvist	6	6

Qualifying competition
(Czechoslovakia) Michaela Pazderová	6	6
(Sweden) Catarina Lindqvist	3	1

=== Third qualifier ===
First round
1	(United States) Dana Gilbert	7	6
8	(Czechoslovakia) Natasha Piskaková	5	3
4	(France) Isabelle Demongeot	6	6
5	(United Kingdom) Cathy Drury	2	4
2	(Canada) Carling Bassett-Seguso	6	7
7	(Australia) Karen Gulley	0	5
3	(France) Pascale Paradis	6	6
6	(Argentina) Liliana Giussani	3	3

Second round
(United States) Dana Gilbert	3	6	6
(France) Isabelle Demongeot	6	2	0
(Canada) Carling Bassett-Seguso	5	3
(France) Pascale Paradis	7	6

Qualifying competition
(United States) Dana Gilbert	4	6	7
(France) Pascale Paradis	6	4	9

=== Fourth qualifier ===
First round
1	(Canada) Angela Walker	2	6	6
8	(United States) Lucy Gordon	6	1	3
4	(United Kingdom) Kate Brasher	6	7
5	(Sweden) Carina Karlsson	3	6
2	(West Germany) Cornelia Dries	6	6
7	(Chile) Germaine Ohaco	4	4
3	(Czechoslovakia) Lea Plchová	2	6	6
6	(France) Nathalie Fuchs	6	2	2

Second round
(Canada) Angela Walker	0	2
(United Kingdom) Kate Brasher	6	6
(West Germany) Cornelia Dries	6	6
(Czechoslovakia) Lea Plchová	3	0

Qualifying competition
(United Kingdom) Kate Brasher	0	3
(West Germany) Cornelia Dries	6	6

=== Fifth qualifier ===
First round
1	(United States) Nancy Neviaser	6	6
8	(Romania) Maria Romanov	4	1
4	(West Germany) Irma Nováková	6	6	6
5	(Italy) Patrizia Murgo	0	7	2
2	(France) Isabelle Vernhes	7	6	6
7	(France) Fiorella Duxin	5	7	4
3	(United States) Sheila McInerney	6	6
6	(France) Nathalie Phan-Thanh	4	2

Second round
(United States) Nancy Neviaser	6	7
(West Germany) Irma Nováková	2	6
(France) Isabelle Vernhes	6	5	9
(United States) Sheila McInerney	0	7	7

Qualifying competition
(United States) Nancy Neviaser	6	6
(France) Isabelle Vernhes	2	3

=== Sixth qualifier ===
First round
1	(Japan) Naoko Sato	6	3	7
8	(West Germany) Sabine Müller	3	6	5
4	(Australia) Bernadette Randall	6	7	8
5	(Italy) Anna Iuale	7	5	6
2	(Bulgaria) Manuela Maleeva	7	6
7	(Hong Kong) Patricia Hy	5	2
3	(United States) Jennifer Mundel	7	6
6	(Canada) Hélène Pelletier	6	2

Second round
(Japan) Naoko Sato	6	3
(Australia) Bernadette Randall	7	6
(Bulgaria) Manuela Maleeva	2	6	6
(United States) Jennifer Mundel	6	4	2

Qualifying competition
(Australia) Bernadette Randall	2	1
(Bulgaria) Manuela Maleeva	6	6

=== Seventh qualifier ===
First round
1	(Switzerland) Karin Stampfli	6	1	8
8	(Australia) Brenda Remilton-Ward	4	6	6
4	(Belgium) Ann Gabriel	6	6
5	(India) Amreeta Ahluwalia	1	2
2	(Australia) Amanda Tobin	6	2	6
7	(France) Isabelle Crudo	4	6	0
3	(United States) Ann Henricksson	6	6	6
6	(United Kingdom) Linda Geeves	7	0	1

Second round
(Switzerland) Karin Stampfli	2	6	2
(Belgium) Ann Gabriel	6	3	6
(Australia) Amanda Tobin	6	2	3
(United States) Ann Henricksson	4	6	6

Qualifying competition
(Belgium) Ann Gabriel	6	6
(United States) Ann Henricksson	1	1

=== Eighth qualifier ===
First round
1	(United Kingdom) Elizabeth Jones	6	6
8	(Canada) Kate Glancy	0	1
4	(Australia) Nerida Gregory	7	6
5	(United Kingdom) Ellinore Lightbody	5	3
2	(Sweden) Berit Björk	7	3	6
7	(Sweden) Catrin Jexell	5	6	2
3	(Netherlands) Yvette Flu	6	6
6	(New Zealand) Chris Newton	1	4

Second round
(United Kingdom) Elizabeth Jones	6	6
(Australia) Nerida Gregory	1	1
(Sweden) Berit Björk	4	5
(Netherlands) Yvette Flu	6	7

Qualifying competition
(United Kingdom) Elizabeth Jones	6	6
(Netherlands) Yvette Flu	1	0
