= 1978 French Open – Women's singles qualifying =

Women's singles qualifying
- 1978 French Open

Events
Singles	men	women		boys	girls
Doubles	men	women	mixed	boys	girls
WC Singles	men	women	quad
WC Doubles	men	women	quad
Legends	−45	45+	women
← 1977 ·	French Open	· 1980 →

Players who neither had high enough rankings nor received wild cards to enter the main draw of the annual French Open Tennis Championships participated in a qualifying tournament held in the week before the event.

== Qualifiers ==
1. (Czechoslovakia) Hana Mandlíková
2. (Czechoslovakia) Mirka Koželuhová
3. (Argentina) Ivanna Madruga
4. (West Germany) Helga Niessen Masthoff
5. (Australia) Amanda Tobin
6. (Australia) Nerida Gregory
7. (Czechoslovakia) Iva Budařová
8. (Australia) Lesley Turner Bowrey

== Qualifying draw ==
=== Key ===
- Q = Qualifier
- WC = Wild card
- LL = Lucky loser
- Alt = Alternate
- ITF = ITF entry
- PR = Protected ranking
- SR = Special ranking
- SE = Special exempt
- JE = Junior exempt
- JR = Junior Accelerator Programme entrant
- CO = College Accelerator Programme entrant
- NG = Next Gen Accelerator Program entrant
- w/o = Walkover
- r = Retired
- d = Defaulted

=== First qualifier ===
First round
(Belgium) Michèle Gurdal	6	6
(United States) Mary-Ann Colville	0	1
Q	(United States) Wendy White	6	6
(Switzerland) Monica Simmen	3	3
Q	(Czechoslovakia) Hana Mandlíková	6	6
(France) Anne-Marie Casado	0	2
(Argentina) Emilse Longo	2	6	6
(United States) Margaret Riley	6	1	2

Second round
(Belgium) Michèle Gurdal	6	6
Q	(United States) Wendy White	3	2
Q	(Czechoslovakia) Hana Mandlíková	6	7
(Argentina) Emilse Longo	1	6

Qualifying competition
(Belgium) Michèle Gurdal	1	7	1
Q	(Czechoslovakia) Hana Mandlíková	6	6	6

=== Second qualifier ===
First round
(United States) Nancy Yeargin	6	6
(Chile) Michelle Rodríguez	3	0
Q	(South Africa) Rosalyn Fairbank	6	6
(Spain) Vicky Baldovinos	3	2
Q	(Czechoslovakia) Mirka Koželuhová	6	6
(United States) Nancy Weigel	2	2
(Canada) Wendy Barlow	6	6
(France) Florence Guédy	3	3

Second round
(United States) Nancy Yeargin	3	3
Q	(South Africa) Rosalyn Fairbank	6	6
Q	(Czechoslovakia) Mirka Koželuhová	6	3	6
(Canada) Wendy Barlow	2	6	4

Qualifying competition
Q	(South Africa) Rosalyn Fairbank	3	3
Q	(Czechoslovakia) Mirka Koželuhová	6	6

=== Third qualifier ===
First round
(Australia) Sue Saliba	6	6
LL	(Austria) Andrea Pesak	2	3
(Argentina) Ivanna Madruga	6	6
(New Zealand) Chris Newton	3	4
Q	(Austria) Helena Wimmer	6	3	6
(Chile) Silvana Urroz	4	6	1
(Italy) Daniela Porzio	4	6	7
LL	(Austria) Uschi Ulrich	6	1	5

Second round
(Australia) Sue Saliba	5	1
(Argentina) Ivanna Madruga	7	6
Q	(Austria) Helena Wimmer	2	5
(Italy) Daniela Porzio	6	7

Qualifying competition
(Argentina) Ivanna Madruga	6	6
(Italy) Daniela Porzio	2	2

=== Fourth qualifier ===
First round
(Japan) Sonoe Yonezawa	6	6
Q	(Czechoslovakia) Lea Plchová	2	3
(West Germany) Helga Niessen Masthoff	6	6
(United States) Susan Zaro	0	3
(United States) Cynthia-Ann Thomas	6	7	6
(France) Nicole Bîmes	7	5	2
Q	(Italy) Manuela Zoni	7	4	6
(Australia) Kym Ruddell	5	6	2

Second round
(Japan) Sonoe Yonezawa	6	6	4
(West Germany) Helga Niessen Masthoff	3	7	6
(United States) Cynthia-Ann Thomas	6	6	6
Q	(Italy) Manuela Zoni	7	0	1

Qualifying competition
(West Germany) Helga Niessen Masthoff	6	6
(United States) Cynthia-Ann Thomas	1	1

=== Fifth qualifier ===
First round
(Italy) Antonella Rosa	3	6	6
(Spain) Carmen Perea	6	4	3
(France) Martine Bureau	6	6
(United States) Gretchen Galt	4	4
(Australia) Amanda Tobin	6	6
(Italy) Anna-Maria Nasuelli	2	3
(Australia) Mary Sawyer	7	4	6
(Argentina) Elvira Weisenberger	6	6	1

Second round
(Italy) Antonella Rosa	7	6
(France) Martine Bureau	5	0
(Australia) Amanda Tobin	6	6
(Australia) Mary Sawyer	4	2

Qualifying competition
(Italy) Antonella Rosa	6	1	0
(Australia) Amanda Tobin	4	6	6

=== Sixth qualifier ===
First round
(Japan) Naoko Sato	6	6
(Switzerland) Petra Jauch-Delhees	3	2
(United States) Leslie Allen	6	4	6
(France) Anne Chevalier	1	6	3
LL	(United States) Jennifer Mundel	6	6
(United States) Erin Dignam	2	4
(Australia) Nerida Gregory	7	3	6
(France) Natalie Scaramanga	6	6	1

Second round
(Japan) Naoko Sato	1	2
(United States) Leslie Allen	6	6
LL	(United States) Jennifer Mundel	0	4
(Australia) Nerida Gregory	6	6

Qualifying competition
(United States) Leslie Allen	6	4	4
(Australia) Nerida Gregory	3	6	6

=== Seventh qualifier ===
First round
(Sweden) Ingrid Löfdahl Bentzer	6	6
(Indonesia) Yolanda Soemarno	2	2
(Australia) Leanne Harrison	0	6	6
(Switzerland) Susana Maria Villaverde	6	1	2
(United States) Anne Fritz	6	6
(France) Perrine Du Puy	3	0
Q	(Czechoslovakia) Iva Budařová	6	6
(United States) Jean Nachand	3	2

Second round
(Sweden) Ingrid Löfdahl Bentzer	1	6	2
(Australia) Leanne Harrison	6	4	6
(United States) Anne Fritz	3	2
Q	(Czechoslovakia) Iva Budařová	6	6

Qualifying competition
(Australia) Leanne Harrison	1	3
Q	(Czechoslovakia) Iva Budařová	6	6

=== Eighth qualifier ===
First round
(United States) Sally Greer	3	6	6
(France) Dominique Beillan	6	3	4
(Argentina) Claudia Casabianca	6	6
LL	(United Kingdom) Anne Hobbs	3	2
(Australia) Lesley Turner Bowrey	7	6
(United Kingdom) Cathy Drury	6	1
(United States) Marlie Buehler	1	6	6
(Switzerland) Annemarie Rüegg	6	1	1

Second round
(United States) Sally Greer	4	3
(Argentina) Claudia Casabianca	6	6
(Australia) Lesley Turner Bowrey	2	7	6
(United States) Marlie Buehler	6	5	0

Qualifying competition
(Argentina) Claudia Casabianca	2	7	2
(Australia) Lesley Turner Bowrey	6	5	6
