= 1980 French Open – Women's singles qualifying =

Women's singles qualifying
- 1980 French Open

Events
Singles	men	women		boys	girls
Doubles	men	women	mixed	boys	girls
WC Singles	men	women	quad
WC Doubles	men	women	quad
Legends	−45	45+	women
← 1978 ·	French Open	· 1982 →

Players who neither had high enough rankings nor received wild cards to enter the main draw of the annual French Open Tennis Championships participated in a qualifying tournament held in the week before the event.

== Qualifiers ==
1. (Romania) Mariana Simionescu
2. (Switzerland) Petra Jauch-Delhees
3. (Hungary) Marie Pinterová
4. (United States) Kimberly Jones
5. (Netherlands) Nanette Schutte
6. (Brazil) Patricia Medrado
7. (Argentina) Claudia Casabianca
8. (France) Caroline Franch

== Lucky losers ==
1. (South Korea) Lee Duk-hee
2. (Czechoslovakia) Hana Strachoňová
3. (Netherlands) Marcella Mesker

== Qualifying draw ==
=== Key ===
- Q = Qualifier
- WC = Wild card
- LL = Lucky loser
- Alt = Alternate
- ITF = ITF entry
- PR = Protected ranking
- SR = Special ranking
- SE = Special exempt
- JE = Junior exempt
- JR = Junior Accelerator Programme entrant
- CO = College Accelerator Programme entrant
- NG = Next Gen Accelerator Program entrant
- w/o = Walkover
- r = Retired
- d = Defaulted

=== First qualifier ===
First round
(Sweden) Helena Anliot	6	7
(Brazil) Cláudia Monteiro	4	5
(Japan) Naoko Sato	6	6
(Italy) Anna-Maria Nasuelli	3	2
(Romania) Mariana Simionescu	6	6
(France) Agnès Figueras	4	0
(Italy) Daniela Porzio	6	6
(New Zealand) Judy Connor	1	2

Second round
(Sweden) Helena Anliot	7	4	4
(Japan) Naoko Sato	5	6	6
(Romania) Mariana Simionescu	6	6	6
(Italy) Daniela Porzio	7	0	3

Qualifying competition
(Japan) Naoko Sato	6	2
(Romania) Mariana Simionescu	7	6

=== Second qualifier ===
First round
(Italy) Manuela Zoni	6	7
(France) Danièle Bouteleux	1	5
(Netherlands) Marianne van der Torre	7	6
(Netherlands) Mariëtte Pakker	5	4
(Argentina) Adriana Villagrán	6	6
(France) Elizabeth Dinopoulos	2	3
(Switzerland) Petra Jauch-Delhees	6	6
(France) Nicole Bîmes	3	3

Second round
(Italy) Manuela Zoni	1	2
(Netherlands) Marianne van der Torre	6	6
(Argentina) Adriana Villagrán	6	6
(Switzerland) Petra Jauch-Delhees	7	7

Qualifying competition
(Netherlands) Marianne van der Torre	0	5
(Switzerland) Petra Jauch-Delhees	6	7

=== Third qualifier ===
First round
(Japan) Kiyoko Nomura	6	6
(United States) Beth Norton	2	4
(Brazil) Gláucia Langela	5	6	6
(Canada) Nina Bland	7	1	4
(France) Sylvie Provoust	6	6	9
(Spain) Carmen Perea	2	7	7
(Hungary) Marie Pinterová	6	6
(Australia) Pam Whytcross	3	3

Second round
(Japan) Kiyoko Nomura	6	6	3
(Brazil) Gláucia Langela	7	4	6
(France) Sylvie Provoust	2	5
(Hungary) Marie Pinterová	6	7

Qualifying competition
(Brazil) Gláucia Langela	6	2	0
(Hungary) Marie Pinterová	1	6	6

=== Fourth qualifier ===
First round
(South Korea) Lee Duk-hee	3	7	6
(Romania) Florența Mihai	6	5	2
(Netherlands) Karin Moos	6	6	6
(France) Sylvie Rual	7	4	0
(United States) Kimberly Jones	6	7
(France) Nathalie Fuchs	3	6
(Sweden) Mimmi Wikstedt	6	6
(France) Pascale Bonneteau	4	1

Second round
(South Korea) Lee Duk-hee	6	6
(Netherlands) Karin Moos	1	4
(United States) Kimberly Jones	0	7	6
(Sweden) Mimmi Wikstedt	6	5	3

Qualifying competition
(South Korea) Lee Duk-hee	3	6
(United States) Kimberly Jones	6	7

=== Fifth qualifier ===
First round
(Australia) Nerida Gregory	6	3	6
(United States) Lindsay Morse	2	6	4
(Netherlands) Nanette Schutte	6	1	7
(France) Marie-Christine Calleja	4	6	5
(France) Corinne Vanier	6	7
(France) Florence Guédy	3	6
(Argentina) Liliana Giussani	6	7
(Romania) Maria Romanov	4	5

Second round
(Australia) Nerida Gregory	3	6	3
(Netherlands) Nanette Schutte	6	4	6
(France) Corinne Vanier	6	6
(Argentina) Liliana Giussani	4	2

Qualifying competition
(Netherlands) Nanette Schutte	7	6
(France) Corinne Vanier	5	3

=== Sixth qualifier ===
First round
(Czechoslovakia) Yvona Brzáková	5	7	6
(United Kingdom) Anthea Stewart	7	5	2
(Brazil) Patricia Medrado	6	6
(France) Sylvie Gardette	1	3
(Australia) Chris O'Neil	6	6
(Belgium) Michèle Gurdal	2	1
(Czechoslovakia) Hana Strachoňová	4	6	6
(Argentina) Andrea Tiezzi	6	1	1

Second round
(Czechoslovakia) Yvona Brzáková	5	2
(Brazil) Patricia Medrado	7	6
(Australia) Chris O'Neil	4	4
(Czechoslovakia) Hana Strachoňová	6	6

Qualifying competition
(Brazil) Patricia Medrado	0	6	6
(Czechoslovakia) Hana Strachoňová	6	4	2

=== Seventh qualifier ===
First round
(Netherlands) Marcella Mesker	7	0	6
(United States) Linda Siegel	6	6	1
(Australia) Anne Minter	3	6	6
(Canada) Marjorie Blackwood	6	4	3
(Italy) Patrizia Murgo	6	6
(France) Fiorella Duxin	3	2
(Argentina) Claudia Casabianca	6	1	6
(Netherlands) Jeske Van Erven	4	6	4

Second round
(Netherlands) Marcella Mesker	4	6	6
(Australia) Anne Minter	6	1	4
(Italy) Patrizia Murgo	6	4	3
(Argentina) Claudia Casabianca	2	6	6

Qualifying competition
(Netherlands) Marcella Mesker	4	1
(Argentina) Claudia Casabianca	6	6

=== Eighth qualifier ===
First round
(United Kingdom) Debbie Jevans	6	7
(Chile) Silvana Urroz	1	5
(France) Caroline Franch	7	6
(New Zealand) Chris Newton	6	3
(France) Anne Chevalier	6	6
(Netherlands) Elly Appel-Vessies	3	3
(Switzerland) Isabelle Villiger	6	6
(Australia) Brenda Catton	2	1

Second round
(United Kingdom) Debbie Jevans	3	4^{r}
(France) Caroline Franch	6	4
(France) Anne Chevalier	4	1
(Switzerland) Isabelle Villiger	6	6

Qualifying competition
(France) Caroline Franch	6	6
(Switzerland) Isabelle Villiger	1	1
