= Penate =

Peñate is a surname of Spanish origin.

Penate may also refer to:

- Jack Peñate (born 1984), British singer-songwriter
- Di Penates, household gods in Roman tradition
