= 1977 French Open – Women's singles qualifying =

Women's singles qualifying
- 1977 French Open

Events
Singles	men	women		boys	girls
Doubles	men	women	mixed	boys	girls
WC Singles	men	women	quad
WC Doubles	men	women	quad
Legends	−45	45+	women
← 1975 ·	French Open	· 1978 →

Players who neither had high enough rankings nor received wild cards to enter the main draw of the annual French Open Tennis Championships participated in a qualifying tournament held in the week before the event.

== Qualifiers ==
1. (Czechoslovakia) Hana Strachoňová
2. (Argentina) Claudia Casabianca
3. (Spain) Carmen Perea
4. (Argentina) Viviana González
5. (France) Sylvie Rual
6. (Japan) Kimiyo Hatanaka
7. (United States) Donna Ganz
8. (Chile) Silvana Urroz

== Lucky losers ==
1. (Australia) Chris O'Neil

== Qualifying draw ==
=== Key ===
- Q = Qualifier
- WC = Wild card
- LL = Lucky loser
- Alt = Alternate
- ITF = ITF entry
- PR = Protected ranking
- SR = Special ranking
- SE = Special exempt
- JE = Junior exempt
- JR = Junior Accelerator Programme entrant
- CO = College Accelerator Programme entrant
- NG = Next Gen Accelerator Program entrant
- w/o = Walkover
- r = Retired
- d = Defaulted

=== First qualifier ===
First round
(Romania) Lucia Romanov-Stark	6	6
(Italy) Antonella Rosa	2	4
(France) Natalie Scaramanga	6	6
(Spain) Mónica Álvarez de Mon	4	4
(West Germany) Marketa Wallenfels	6	7
(United States) Caroline Lane	2	5

Second round
(Argentina) Ivanna Madruga	6	6	6
(Australia) Christine Matison	7	2	3
(Czechoslovakia) Hana Strachoňová	1	6	6
(Romania) Lucia Romanov-Stark	6	4	2
(France) Natalie Scaramanga	6	6	6
(Indonesia) Yolanda Soemarno	4	7	2
(West Germany) Marketa Wallenfels	6	6
(France) Rosie Reyes	4	3

Third round
(Argentina) Ivanna Madruga	2	6
(Czechoslovakia) Hana Strachoňová	6	7
(France) Natalie Scaramanga	6	5	10
(West Germany) Marketa Wallenfels	4	7	12

Qualifying competition
(Czechoslovakia) Hana Strachoňová	7	6	6
(West Germany) Marketa Wallenfels	6	7	1

=== Second qualifier ===
First round
(Australia) Jan Wilton	6	1	6
(France) Agnès Figueras	4	6	1
(Argentina) Beatriz Villaverde	6	7
(Hungary) Eva Rozsavolgyi	3	6

Second round
(Australia) Jan Wilton	4	6	6
(United States) Nancy Ornstein	6	1	4
(Argentina) Elvira Weisenberger	7	7
(France) Dominique Beillan	6	5
(Argentina) Claudia Casabianca	6	6
(Denmark) Helle Sparre	4	2
(Italy) Anna-Maria Nasuelli	6	6
(Argentina) Beatriz Villaverde	0	2

Third round
(Australia) Jan Wilton	3	4
(Argentina) Elvira Weisenberger	6	6
(Argentina) Claudia Casabianca	6	6
(Italy) Anna-Maria Nasuelli	2	2

Qualifying competition
(Argentina) Elvira Weisenberger	6	5
(Argentina) Claudia Casabianca	7	7

=== Third qualifier ===
First round
(France) Elizabeth Dinopoulos	2	6	6
(Australia) Nerida Gregory	6	2	3
(United States) Cynthia-Ann Thomas	6	6
(Switzerland) Annina Von Planta	3	4
(United States) Roylee Bailey	6	6
(Indonesia) Elfia Nizarwan	0	1

Second round
(West Germany) Sylvia Hanika	6	6
(France) Elizabeth Dinopoulos	4	2
(United States) Cynthia-Ann Thomas	7	6	8
(Chile) Michelle Rodríguez	5	7	6
(France) Perrine Du Puy	7	6
(United States) Roylee Bailey	5	4
(Spain) Carmen Perea	6	3
(France) Martine Bureau	1	0^{r}

Third round
(West Germany) Sylvia Hanika	5	6	7
(United States) Cynthia-Ann Thomas	7	4	9
(France) Perrine Du Puy	3	5
(Spain) Carmen Perea	6	7

Qualifying competition
(United States) Cynthia-Ann Thomas	2	6	2
(Spain) Carmen Perea	6	4	6

=== Fourth qualifier ===
First round
(France) Martine Cazaux	3	6	6
(United States) Erin Dignam	6	4	3
(Australia) Kaye Hallam	3	7	6
(Japan) Kayoko Fukuoka	6	6	0

Second round
(France) Dominique Oustric	4	6	7
(Israel) Paulina Peled	6	2	5
(Italy) Daniela Porzio	6	6
(France) Martine Cazaux	0	2
(Argentina) Viviana González	6	6
(Italy) Carla Mei	2	2
(France) Catherine Chevalier	6	3	6
(Australia) Kaye Hallam	3	6	3

Third round
(France) Dominique Oustric	3	4
(Italy) Daniela Porzio	6	6
(Argentina) Viviana González	6	6
(France) Catherine Chevalier	3	2

Qualifying competition
(Italy) Daniela Porzio	4	4
(Argentina) Viviana González	6	6

=== Fifth qualifier ===
First round
(France) A. Belladonna	6	6
(United States) D. Maccloskey	0	4
(Argentina) Adriana Villagrán	6	7
(Hungary) Erzsébet Polgár	1	6

Second round
(Spain) Vicky Baldovinos	6	6
(France) A. Belladonna	4	3
(France) Sylvie Rual	6	6
(South Africa) Helen Liebenberg	2	3
(Argentina) Adriana Villagrán	6	7
(France) Odile de Roubin	2	6
(Australia) Amanda Tobin	5	6	6
(France) Martine Jodin	7	4	1

Third round
(Spain) Vicky Baldovinos	4	3
(France) Sylvie Rual	6	6
(Argentina) Adriana Villagrán	3	6	7
(Australia) Amanda Tobin	6	1	5

Qualifying competition
(France) Sylvie Rual	6	6
(Argentina) Adriana Villagrán	4	4

=== Sixth qualifier ===
First round
(Japan) Kimiyo Hatanaka	6	6
(France) -. Marine	1	2
(France) Catherine Alzate	6	3	6
(Indonesia) Ayi Sutarno	2	6	0

Second round
(France) Pascale Bonneteau	6	6	7
(United States) Laurie Tenney	7	1	5
(Japan) Kimiyo Hatanaka	2	6	7
(West Germany) Petra Van Oyen	6	3	5
(Switzerland) Susana Maria Villaverde	6	6
(Switzerland) Monica Simmen	3	4
(France) Nicole Bîmes	6	6
(France) Catherine Alzate	0	4

Third round
(France) Pascale Bonneteau	6	3	5
(Japan) Kimiyo Hatanaka	2	6	7
(Switzerland) Susana Maria Villaverde	5	6	6
(France) Nicole Bîmes	7	2	3

Qualifying competition
(Japan) Kimiyo Hatanaka	6	6
(Switzerland) Susana Maria Villaverde	1	3

=== Seventh qualifier ===
First round
(United Kingdom) Anne Hobbs	6	6	6
(Argentina) Cecilia Barbat	2	7	2
(Italy) Manuela Zoni	6	6
(France) M. Mesek	0	1
(Czechoslovakia) Iva Budařová	6	6	6
(France) Danièle Bouteleux	7	4	2

Second round
(Australia) Chris O'Neil	6	6	6
(United Kingdom) Anne Hobbs	3	7	0
(Sweden) Nina Bohm	7	6
(Hungary) Eva Fridenzi	6	0
(United States) Donna Ganz	6	6
(Argentina) Marcela Viviana Cataldi	2	4
(Italy) Manuela Zoni	7	4	2
(Czechoslovakia) Iva Budařová	6	6	6

Third round
(Australia) Chris O'Neil	7	7
(Sweden) Nina Bohm	5	5
(United States) Donna Ganz	5	6	6
(Czechoslovakia) Iva Budařová	7	2	4

Qualifying competition
(Australia) Chris O'Neil	6	1
(United States) Donna Ganz	7	6

=== Eighth qualifier ===
First round
(Australia) Kym Ruddell	6	6
(United States) Wendy McColskey	3	1
(France) Élisabeth Du Fresne-Girard	4	6	7
(Australia) Pamela Baily	6	1	5

Second round
(Australia) Kym Ruddell	6	6
(Argentina) Diana Flickier	0	3
(Belgium) Monique Van Haver	2	7	6
(United States) Linda Thomas	6	5	2
(Chile) Silvana Urroz	6	6
(United States) Margaret Riley	4	2
(West Germany) Marion Foldina	7	7
(France) Élisabeth Du Fresne-Girard	5	5

Third round
(Australia) Kym Ruddell	3	4
(Belgium) Monique Van Haver	6	6
(Chile) Silvana Urroz	6	6
(West Germany) Marion Foldina	1	0

Qualifying competition
(Belgium) Monique Van Haver	2	2
(Chile) Silvana Urroz	6	6
