= 1978 Wimbledon Championships – Women's singles qualifying =

Women's singles qualifying
- 1978 Wimbledon Championships

Events
Singles	men	women		boys	girls
Doubles	men	women	mixed	boys	girls
WC Singles	men	women	quad
WC Doubles	men	women	quad
Legends	men	women	seniors

Qualification
Singles	men	women
Doubles	men	women	mixed
- Wimbledon Championships

Players who neither had high enough rankings nor received wild cards to enter the main draw of the annual Wimbledon Tennis Championships participated in a qualifying tournament held one week before the event.

== Qualifiers ==
1. (South Africa) Ilana Kloss
2. (Czechoslovakia) Marie Pinterová
3. (New Zealand) Judy Connor
4. (Israel) Paulina Peled
5. (Canada) Wendy Barlow
6. (Belgium) Monique Gurdal
7. (Canada) Marjorie Blackwood
8. (United States) Anne Smith

== Qualifying draw ==
Key

- Q = Qualifier
- WC = Wild card
- LL = Lucky loser
- Alt = Alternate
- ITF = ITF entry
- PR = Protected ranking
- SR = Special ranking
- SE = Special exempt
- JE = Junior exempt
- JR = Junior Accelerator Programme entrant
- CO = College Accelerator Programme entrant
- NG = Next Gen Accelerator Program entrant
- w/o = Walkover
- r = Retired
- d = Defaulted

=== First qualifier ===
First round
1	(South Africa) Ilana Kloss	6	6
8	(France) Dominique Beillan	3	3
4	(Sweden) Nina Bohm	6	6
5	(Australia) Kym Ruddell	2	4
2	(United Kingdom) Clare Harrison	6	6
7	(United States) Alycia Moulton	2	4
3	(Sweden) Ingrid Lofdahl-Bentzer	6	6
6	(United Kingdom) Anthea Cooper	4	3

Second round
(South Africa) Ilana Kloss	6	6
(Sweden) Nina Bohm	2	1
(United Kingdom) Clare Harrison	3	6	6
(Sweden) Ingrid Lofdahl-Bentzer	6	1	1

Qualifying competition
(South Africa) Ilana Kloss	7	6
(United Kingdom) Clare Harrison	5	1

=== Second qualifier ===
First round
1	(Czechoslovakia) Marie Pinterová	6	6
8	(France) Anne Chevalier	4	1
4	(United Kingdom) Belinda Thompson	7	3	6
5	(Australia) Wendy Gilchrist	5	6	4
2	(United States) Heather Ludloff	6	7
7	(Chile) Silvana Urroz	1	5
3	(Japan) Naoko Sato	6	6
6	(United States) Jean Nachand	0	4

Second round
(Czechoslovakia) Marie Pinterová	6	6
(United Kingdom) Belinda Thompson	2	3
(United States) Heather Ludloff	6	8	6
(Japan) Naoko Sato	3	9	3

Qualifying competition
(Czechoslovakia) Marie Pinterová	6	6
(United States) Heather Ludloff	4	2

=== Third qualifier ===
First round
1	(New Zealand) Judy Connor	1	6	6
8	(Australia) Julie Harrison	6	3	3
4	(France) Gail Chanfreau	6	6
5	(Argentina) Elvira Weisenberger	4	2
2	(Italy) Daniela Porzio	6	6
7	(South Africa) Gwynn Sammel	2	4
3	(Australia) Sue Saliba	2	8	6
6	(United States) Nancy Yeargin	6	6	3

Second round
(New Zealand) Judy Connor	6	6
(France) Gail Chanfreau	3	2
(Italy) Daniela Porzio	6	6
(Australia) Sue Saliba	3	2

Qualifying competition
(New Zealand) Judy Connor	6	6
(Italy) Daniela Porzio	2	4

=== Fourth qualifier ===
First round
1	(Israel) Paulina Peled	6	6
8	(France) Roual	2	2
4	(United Kingdom) Annette Coe	6	4	6
5	(United States) Gretchen Galt	4	6	3
2	(United States) Sally Greer	4	6	6
7	(United States) Lisa Kearney	6	3	2
3	(United States) Cynthia-Ann Thomas	6	4	6
6	(United States) Zoro	2	6	2

Second round
(Israel) Paulina Peled	9	8
(United Kingdom) Annette Coe	7	6
(United States) Sally Greer	6	2	15
(United States) Cynthia-Ann Thomas	2	6	13

Qualifying competition
(Israel) Paulina Peled	6	5	6
(United States) Sally Greer	4	7	4

=== Fifth qualifier ===
First round
1	(Canada) Wendy Barlow	6	6
8	(Hungary) Beatrix Klein	2	1
4	(United Kingdom) Corinne Molesworth	6	6
5	(United Kingdom) Cathy Drury	1	3
2	(Czechoslovakia) Hana Mandlíková	6	6
7	(Japan) Sonoe Yonezawa	1	4
3	(United States) Jane Preyer	6	6
6	(United Kingdom) Linda Geeves	2	4

Second round
(Canada) Wendy Barlow	6	5	6
(United Kingdom) Corinne Molesworth	2	7	3
(Czechoslovakia) Hana Mandlíková	6	6
(United States) Jane Preyer	4	0

Qualifying competition
(Canada) Wendy Barlow	3	6	6
(Czechoslovakia) Hana Mandlíková	6	4	3

=== Sixth qualifier ===
First round
1	(Belgium) Monique Gurdal	6	6
8	(New Zealand) Chris Newton	2	1
4	(Argentina) Ivana Madruga	6	6
5	(United States) Erin Dignam	3	2
2	(United States) Renee Blount	6	1	6
7	(United States) Nancy Ornstein	4	6	2
3	(United States) Leslie Allen	6	6
6	(United States) Margaret Riley	3	3

Second round
(Belgium) Monique Gurdal	7	3	6
(Argentina) Ivana Madruga	5	6	1
(United States) Renee Blount	6	4	6
(United States) Leslie Allen	3	6	3

Qualifying competition
(Belgium) Monique Gurdal	8	1	8
(United States) Renee Blount	6	6	6

=== Seventh qualifier ===
First round
1	(Canada) Marjorie Blackwood	6	6
8	(United States) Beverly Buckley	2	1
4	(United States) Susan Hagey	6	6
5	(United Kingdom) Kate Brasher	1	2
2	(Australia) Amanda Tobin	9	6
7	(Australia) Nerida Gregory	7	3
3	(Argentina) Claudia Casabianca	9	6
6	(United States) Tory Fretz	8	1

Second round
(Canada) Marjorie Blackwood	6	4	6
(United States) Susan Hagey	2	6	3
(Australia) Amanda Tobin	6	6
(Argentina) Claudia Casabianca	4	4

Qualifying competition
(Canada) Marjorie Blackwood	8	7
(Australia) Amanda Tobin	6	5

=== Eighth qualifier ===
First round
1	(United States) Anne Smith	6	6
8	(United States) Nancy Weigel	3	4
4	(Australia) Mary Sawyer	6	6
5	(United Kingdom) Lindsey Beaven	1	3
2	(United Kingdom) Kate Glancy	6	6
7	(United Kingdom) Penny Moor	3	2
3	(Germany) Heidi Eisterlehner	3	6	8
6	(United Kingdom) Debbie Jevans	6	3	6

Second round
(United States) Anne Smith	6	6
(Australia) Mary Sawyer	4	2
(United Kingdom) Kate Glancy	6	9
(Germany) Heidi Eisterlehner	3	8

Qualifying competition
(United States) Anne Smith	6	6
(United Kingdom) Kate Glancy	4	2
