= Kristie Boogert =

Dutch tennis player

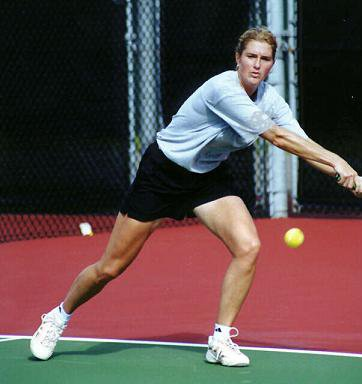
- Country (sports): Netherlands
- Residence: Rotterdam, Netherlands
- Born: 16 December 1973 (age 52) Oud-Beijerland, Netherlands
- Height: 1.78 m (5 ft 10 in)
- Turned pro: 1991
- Retired: 2003
- Plays: Right-handed (two-handed backhand)
- Prize money: $1,364,008

Singles
- Career record: 256–239
- Career titles: 2 ITF
- Highest ranking: No. 29 (5 February 1996)

Grand Slam singles results
- Australian Open: 3R (1995, 1996, 1997)
- French Open: 3R (1993, 1994, 1995, 1996, 1999)
- Wimbledon: 3R (1994, 1995, 1996)
- US Open: 3R (2000)

Other tournaments
- Olympic Games: 2R (2000)

Doubles
- Career record: 194–158
- Career titles: 3 WTA, 4 ITF
- Highest ranking: No. 16 (3 February 1997)

Grand Slam doubles results
- Australian Open: QF (1995)
- French Open: 3R (1995)
- Wimbledon: QF (1999, 2000)
- US Open: 3R (1994, 1996, 1997)
Medal record
Representing Netherlands
Olympic Games
Silver medal – second place	2000 Sydney	Doubles

Kristie Boogert (born 16 December 1973) is a Dutch former professional female tennis player. She retired in 2003 due to chronic elbow pain. On 5 February 1996, she reached her career-high singles ranking of world No. 29.

She has not won any singles titles, but did win three titles in doubles. At the 1994 French Open championships, she won the mixed doubles title with countryman Menno Oosting.

Her biggest achievement came during the 2000 Summer Olympics in Sydney where she won the silver medal in doubles, partnering Miriam Oremans. They were beaten by Venus and Serena Williams in the final.

== Olympic finals ==
=== Doubles: 1 (silver) ===
Outcome	Year	Location	Surface	Partner	Opponents	Score
Silver	2000	Sydney	Hard	(Netherlands) Miriam Oremans	(United States) Serena Williams (United States) Venus Williams	1–6, 1–6

== Grand Slam finals ==
=== Mixed doubles: 1 (runner-up) ===
Result	Year	Championship	Surface	Partner	Opponents	Score
Win	1994	French Open	Clay	(Netherlands) Menno Oosting	(Russia) Andrei Olhovskiy (Soviet Union) Larisa Savchenko	7–5, 3–6, 7–5

== WTA Tour finals ==
=== Singles: 1 (runner-up) ===
Legend
Tier I	0
Tier II	0
Tier III	0
Tier IV & V	0

Result	W/L	Date	Tournament	Surface	Opponent	Score
Loss	0–1	Apr 2000	Budapest, Hungary	Clay	(Italy) Tathiana Garbin	2–6, 6–7^{(4–7)}

=== Doubles: 10 (3 titles, 7 runner-ups) ===
Legend
Grand Slam	0
Tier I	0
Tier II	1
Tier III	1
Tier IV & V	1

Titles by surface
Hard	1
Clay	0
Grass	1
Carpet	1

Result	W/L	Date	Tournament	Surface	Partner	Opponents	Score
Loss	0–1	May 1994	Prague, Czech Republic	Clay	(Italy) Laura Golarsa	(South Africa) Amanda Coetzer (United States) Linda Wild	4–6, 6–3, 2–6
Win	1–1	Feb 1996	Paris, France	Clay	(Czech Republic) Jana Novotná	(France) Julie Halard-Decugis (France) Nathalie Tauziat	6–4, 6–3
Loss	1–2	Jun 1996	Rosmalen, Netherlands	Grass	(Czech Republic) Helena Suková	(Soviet Union) Larisa Savchenko (Netherlands) Brenda Schultz-McCarthy	4–6, 6–7
Win	2–2	Oct 1996	Leipzig, Germany	Carpet	(France) Nathalie Tauziat	(Netherlands) Miriam Oremans (Belgium) Sabine Appelmans	6–4, 6–4
Win	3–2	Oct 1996	Luxembourg	Carpet	(France) Nathalie Tauziat	(Germany) Barbara Rittner (Belgium) Dominique Monami	2–6, 6–4, 6–2
Loss	3–3	Jun 1999	's-Hertogenbosch, Netherlands	Grass	(Zimbabwe) Cara Black	(Italy) Silvia Farina Elia (Italy) Rita Grande	5–7, 6–7
Loss	3–4	Oct 2000	Sydney Olympics	Hard	(Netherlands) Miriam Oremans	(United States) Venus Williams (United States) Serena Williams	1–6, 1–6
Loss	3–5	Feb 2001	Doha, Qatar	Hard	(Netherlands) Miriam Oremans	(France) Sandrine Testud (Italy) Roberta Vinci	5–7, 6–7^{(4–7)}
Loss	3–6	May 2001	Antwerp, Belgium	Clay	(Netherlands) Miriam Oremans	(Belgium) Els Callens (Spain) Virginia Ruano Pascual	3–6, 6–3, 4–6
Loss	3–7	Apr 2002	Porto, Portugal	Clay	(Spain) Magüi Serna	(Zimbabwe) Cara Black (Kazakhstan) Irina Selyutina	6–7^{(6–8)}, 4–6

== ITF finals ==
$100,000 tournaments
$75,000 tournaments
$50,000 tournaments
$25,000 tournaments
$10,000 tournaments

=== Singles (2–1) ===
Result	No.	Date	Tournament	Surface	Opponent	Score
Win	1.	8 December 1991	Le Havre, France	Clay	(Spain) Noelia Pérez Peñate	6–1, 6–4
Win	2.	2 November 1997	Poitiers, France	Clay	(France) Amélie Cocheteux	6–4, 7–5
Loss	3.	9 May 1999	Bratislava, Slovakia	Clay	(Slovenia) Katarina Srebotnik	3–6, 1–6

=== Doubles (4–2) ===
Result	No	Date	Tournament	Surface	Partner	Opponents	Score
Win	1.	28 March 1993	Brest, France	Hard	(Netherlands) Linda Niemantsverdriet	(Russia) Elena Likhovtseva (Russia) Elena Makarova	4–6, 7–5, 7–5
Win	2.	7 December 1997	Cergy-Pontoise, France	Hard (i)	(Netherlands) Miriam Oremans	(France) Julie Halard-Decugis (France) Anne-Gaëlle Sidot	7–5, 6–4
Win	3.	6 December 1998	Cergy-Pontoise, France	Hard (i)	(France) Anne-Gaëlle Sidot	(France) Caroline Dhenin (France) Émilie Loit	7–5, 6–2
Loss	4.	1 November 1999	Jaffa, Israel	Hard	(Netherlands) Michelle Gerards	(Israel) Tzipora Obziler (Israel) Hila Rosen	4–6, 6–1, 4–6
Loss	5.	13 August 2001	Bronx, United States	Hard	(Belgium) Els Callens	(Argentina) Clarisa Fernández (Japan) Rika Fujiwara	6–2, 6–7^{(3–7)}, 4–6
Win	6.	14 October 2001	Poitiers, France	Hard (i)	(Belgium) Laurence Courtois	(Bulgaria) Lubomira Bacheva (Netherlands) Amanda Hopmans	6–1, 7–5
