= 1983 French Open – Women's singles qualifying =

Women's singles qualifying
- 1983 French Open

Events
Singles	men	women		boys	girls
Doubles	men	women	mixed	boys	girls
WC Singles	men	women	quad
WC Doubles	men	women	quad
Legends	−45	45+	women
← 1982 ·	French Open	· 1984 →

Players who neither had high enough rankings nor received wild cards to enter the main draw of the annual French Open Tennis Championships participated in a qualifying tournament held in the week before the event.

== Seeds ==
1. (Japan) Etsuko Inoue (qualified)
2. (Australia) Amanda Tobin (qualifying competition)
3. (United States) Trey Lewis (first round)
4. -
5. (United States) Beverly Bowes (first round)
6. (Socialist Federal Republic of Yugoslavia) Sabrina Goleš (qualified)
7. (United States) Stacy Margolin (qualifying competition)
8. (United Kingdom) Debbie Jevans (first round)
9. (United States) Susan Rimes (second round)
10. (South Africa) Rene Uys (qualifying competition)
11. (Hungary) Marie Pinterová (second round)
12. (Socialist Federal Republic of Yugoslavia) Renata Šašak (qualified)
13. (United Kingdom) Kate Brasher (qualified)
14. (Australia) Pam Whytcross (qualified)
15. (Australia) Brenda Remilton-Ward (first round)

== Qualifiers ==
1. (Japan) Etsuko Inoue
2. (France) Marie-Christine Calleja
3. (United Kingdom) Kate Brasher
4. (Socialist Federal Republic of Yugoslavia) Renata Šašak
5. (Socialist Federal Republic of Yugoslavia) Sabrina Goleš
6. (Australia) Pam Whytcross
7. (Sweden) Carina Karlsson
8. (West Germany) Steffi Graf

== Qualifying draw ==
=== Key ===
- Q = Qualifier
- WC = Wild card
- LL = Lucky loser
- Alt = Alternate
- ITF = ITF entry
- PR = Protected ranking
- SR = Special ranking
- SE = Special exempt
- JE = Junior exempt
- JR = Junior Accelerator Programme entrant
- CO = College Accelerator Programme entrant
- NG = Next Gen Accelerator Program entrant
- w/o = Walkover
- r = Retired
- d = Defaulted

=== First qualifier ===
First round
1	(Japan) Etsuko Inoue	6	5	6
(United Kingdom) Rina Einy	3	7	3
(United Kingdom) Elizabeth Jones	6	7
(United Kingdom) Annabel Croft	4	5
(Belgium) Ann Gabriel	7	5	6
(France) Emmanuelle Folcher	5	7	3
(United Kingdom) Ellinore Lightbody	3	3
Alt	(Japan) Naoko Sato	6	6

Second round
1	(Japan) Etsuko Inoue	5	6	6
(United Kingdom) Elizabeth Jones	7	4	1
(Belgium) Ann Gabriel	7	6
Alt	(Japan) Naoko Sato	6	4

Qualifying competition
1	(Japan) Etsuko Inoue	4	6	9
(Belgium) Ann Gabriel	6	4	7

=== Second qualifier ===
First round
8	(United Kingdom) Debbie Jevans	4	2
(Spain) Carmen Perea	6	6
(United States) Marianne Werdel	3	2
(France) Marie-Christine Calleja	6	6
(Switzerland) Eva Krapl	7	3	6
(Netherlands) Nanette Schutte	6	6	4
(Italy) Patrizia Murgo	3	2
10	(South Africa) Rene Uys	6	6

Second round
(Spain) Carmen Perea	6	3	5
(France) Marie-Christine Calleja	3	6	7
(Switzerland) Eva Krapl	5	0
10	(South Africa) Rene Uys	7	6

Qualifying competition
(France) Marie-Christine Calleja	6	7
10	(South Africa) Rene Uys	4	6

=== Third qualifier ===
First round
3	(United States) Trey Lewis	1	6	3
(Spain) Ana Almansa Suarez	6	1	6
(West Germany) Irma Nováková	1	6	6
(Switzerland) Karin Stampfli	6	1	0
(Argentina) Andrea Tiezzi	6	2	8
(Italy) Antonella Canapi	4	6	6
(Australia) Nerida Gregory	1	0
13	(United Kingdom) Kate Brasher	6	6

Second round
(Spain) Ana Almansa Suarez	1	6	5
(West Germany) Irma Nováková	6	1	7
(Argentina) Andrea Tiezzi	4	4
13	(United Kingdom) Kate Brasher	6	6

Qualifying competition
(West Germany) Irma Nováková	1	1
13	(United Kingdom) Kate Brasher	6	6

=== Fourth qualifier ===
First round
12	(Socialist Federal Republic of Yugoslavia) Renata Šašak	6	6
(Netherlands) Karin Moos	4	1
(France) Isabelle Crudo	2	1
(Australia) Annette Gulley	6	6
(France) Catherine Bonnet	6	4	6
(United States) Jamie Golder	3	6	8
(Netherlands) Marianne van der Torre	6	3	6
5	(United States) Beverly Bowes	2	6	3

Second round
12	(Socialist Federal Republic of Yugoslavia) Renata Šašak	6	6
(Australia) Annette Gulley	4	4
(United States) Jamie Golder	1	2
(Netherlands) Marianne van der Torre	6	6

Qualifying competition
12	(Socialist Federal Republic of Yugoslavia) Renata Šašak	6	6
(Netherlands) Marianne van der Torre	2	2

=== Fifth qualifier ===
First round
6	(Socialist Federal Republic of Yugoslavia) Sabrina Goleš	6	6
(Sweden) Helena Olsson	3	2
(Switzerland) Susanne Schmid	6	3	6
(Chile) Germaine Ohaco	2	6	4
(Greece) Angeliki Kanellopoulou	6	3	6
(Soviet Union) Larisa Neiland	4	6	4
(United States) Marsha Bladel	2	3
11	(Hungary) Marie Pinterová	6	6

Second round
6	(Socialist Federal Republic of Yugoslavia) Sabrina Goleš	6	6
(Switzerland) Susanne Schmid	2	4
(Greece) Angeliki Kanellopoulou	4	6	6
11	(Hungary) Marie Pinterová	6	4	2

Qualifying competition
6	(Socialist Federal Republic of Yugoslavia) Sabrina Goleš	6	6
(Greece) Angeliki Kanellopoulou	1	1

=== Sixth qualifier ===
First round
14	(Australia) Pam Whytcross	7	6
(United States) Sheila McInerney	5	2
(West Germany) Petra Keppeler	6	6
(United States) Shelby Torrance	3	2
(France) Pascale Etchemendy	2	0
(Austria) Petra Huber	6	6
(Sweden) Berit Björk	3	1
Alt	(Australia) Bernadette Randall	6	6

Second round
14	(Australia) Pam Whytcross	7	2	7
(West Germany) Petra Keppeler	6	6	5
(Austria) Petra Huber	7	6
Alt	(Australia) Bernadette Randall	5	1

Qualifying competition
14	(Australia) Pam Whytcross	6	6
(Austria) Petra Huber	4	1

=== Seventh qualifier ===
First round
9	(United States) Susan Rimes	6	2	6
(South Africa) Kim Seddon	2	6	2
(France) Fiorella Duxin	6	3	6
(Sweden) Carina Karlsson	0	6	8
(Soviet Union) Julia Apostoli	3	3
(Netherlands) Judith Warringa	6	6
(Netherlands) Yvette Flu	1	4
7	(United States) Stacy Margolin	6	6

Second round
9	(United States) Susan Rimes	3	5
(Sweden) Carina Karlsson	6	7
(Netherlands) Judith Warringa	6	2
7	(United States) Stacy Margolin	7	6

Qualifying competition
(Sweden) Carina Karlsson	6	6
7	(United States) Stacy Margolin	3	4

=== Eighth qualifier ===
First round
15	(Australia) Brenda Remilton-Ward	5	5
(West Germany) Gabriela Dinu	7	7
(West Germany) Steffi Graf	3	6	6
(West Germany) Myriam Schropp	6	2	4
(West Germany) Helga Lütten	6	6
(United Kingdom) Shelley Walpole	4	4
(Sweden) Maria Lindström	2	0
2	(Australia) Amanda Tobin	6	6

Second round
(West Germany) Gabriela Dinu	5	2
(West Germany) Steffi Graf	7	6
(West Germany) Helga Lütten	0	2
2	(Australia) Amanda Tobin	6	6

Qualifying competition
(West Germany) Steffi Graf	6	3	6
2	(Australia) Amanda Tobin	2	6	1
