= Cynthia-Ann Thomas =

American tennis player

- Country (sports): United States

Singles

Grand Slam singles results
- French Open: Q4 (1977)
- Wimbledon: Q2 (1971, 1978)
- US Open: Q1 (1977)

Doubles

Grand Slam doubles results
- French Open: 1R (1977, 1978)
- Wimbledon: 2R (1978)
- US Open: 2R (1977)

Grand Slam mixed doubles results
- Wimbledon: 1R (1977)

Cynthia-Ann Thomas (born 1950s) is an American former professional tennis player.

== Tennis career ==
As a junior competing in the under-12s, Thomas was ranked among the top-10 players in the U.S.

Thomas played collegiate tennis for the UCLA Bruins and earned All-American honors in 1976, then joined the professional tour, where she played in the doubles draw of grand slam tournaments, including Wimbledon.

== Personal life ==
Thomas is a third-generation Californian, with her great-grandfather the founder of Cawston Ostrich Farm in South Pasadena, which was the first ostrich farm in the U.S.

In 1981, she married James Pardee Jr. at a church in Beverly Hills.
