= Peñate =

- Pronunciation: Spanish: [peˈɲate]
- Gender: Unisex
- Language: Spanish

Origin
- Languages: Spanish and Basque
- Derivation: Pineda, Pinto, Puente, Peinado, Pantoja, Pinedo, Pont, Ponte, Pando, Pujante, Penedo, Pejenaute, Pañeda, Punti, Pinta, Pantiga, Pintea, Peñato, Pandiella, Panait, Ponti, Pomeda, Puñet, Pujantell, Penido, Penide, Pomata, Pantea, Pontaque, Pantojo

Peñate (Spanish pronunciation: [peˈɲate]) is a surname of Spanish origin. It appears to have originated in the town of Aguilar de Campo in the Province of Palencia, Castile and León. The name comes from peña, the Spanish word for "cliff", and the Basque ate, meaning "gate" or "ravine".

== Statistics ==
In Spain, there are 2,019 people with the last name Peñate. These people live in 52 provinces, though the majority live in Las Palmas. There is also a relatively high concentration on Peñates in Santa Cruz de Tenerife, Huelva, Sevilla, Madrid, and Barcelona.

== People ==
- Jack Peñate (born 1984), English musician and singer-songwriter
- Noelia Pérez Peñate (born 1972), Spanish tennis player
