= List of Italy Fed Cup team representatives =

This is a list of tennis players who have represented the Italy Fed Cup team in an official Fed Cup match. Italy have taken part in the competition since 1963.

== Players ==
Player	W-L (Total)	W-L (Singles)	W-L (Doubles)	Ties	Debut
Lucia Bassi	4 – 6	0 – 1	4 – 5	9	1969
Nathalie Baudone	3 – 1	1 – 0	2 – 1	3	1996
Maria Francesca Bentivoglio	0 – 1	0 – 1	-	1	1993
Federica Bonsignori	1 – 0	-	1 – 0	1	1991
Alberta Brianti	0 – 1	-	0 – 1	1	2011
Nastassja Burnett	0 – 1	-	0 – 1	1	2014
Maria Elena Camerin	1 – 5	0 – 4	1 – 1	5	2001
Martina Caregaro	0 – 1	-	0 – 1	1	2016
Giulia Casoni	8 – 3	1 – 2	7 – 1	9	1997
Cathy Caverzasio	2 – 1	1 – 0	1 – 1	3	1988
Sandra Cecchini	16 – 17	12 – 10	4 – 7	25	1983
Deborah Chiesa	1 – 1	1 – 0	0 – 1	2	2018
Elisabetta Cocciaretto	0 – 1	-	0 – 1	1	2018
Monique Di Maso	2 – 1	2 – 1	-	3	1974
Sara Errani	25 – 19	16 – 15	9 – 4	23	2008
Silvia Farina Elia	23 – 11	21 – 8	2 – 3	21	1993
Linda Ferrando	4 – 4	1 – 2	3 – 2	5	1991
Tathiana Garbin	6 – 7	4 – 3	2 – 4	11	1999
Laura Garrone	7 – 9	3 – 2	4 – 7	12	1985
Camila Giorgi	3 – 5	3 – 4	0 – 1	5	2014
Monica Giorgi	0 – 2	0 – 1	0 – 1	1	1972
Laura Golarsa	9 – 4	3 – 0	6 – 4	10	1989
Francesca Gordigiani	1 – 6	1 – 2	0 – 4	4	1964
Rita Grande	6 – 13	5 – 8	1 – 5	13	1994
Marzia Grossi	0 – 2	-	0 – 2	2	1994
Karin Knapp	3 – 4	2 – 1	1 – 3	5	2008
Laura Lapi	1 – 1	1 – 1	-	2	1988
Silvana Lazzarino	5 – 3	0 – 1	5 – 2	7	1963
Francesca Lubiani	6 – 3	2 – 2	4 – 1	7	1997
Daniela Marzano	15 – 14	10 – 5	5 – 9	18	1971
Alice Matteucci	0 – 1	-	0 – 1	1	2014
Patrizia Murgo	6 – 2	-	6 – 2	8	1981
Anna-Maria Nasuelli	4 – 6	3 – 3	1 – 3	6	1971
Caterina Nozzoli	0 – 1	-	0 – 1	1	1987
Romina Oprandi	-	-	-	1	2006
Jasmine Paolini	1 – 5	0 – 2	1 – 3	4	2017
Flavia Pennetta	25 – 5	21 – 4	4 – 1	19	2003
Flora Perfetti	3 – 0	2 – 0	1 – 0	2	1997
Lea Pericoli	15 – 15	8 – 8	7 – 7	17	1963
Gloria Pizzichini	7 – 1	3 – 1	4 – 0	7	1997
Raffaella Reggi	18 – 15	14 – 6	4 – 9	21	1982
Maria Teresa Riedl	7 – 7	5 – 6	2 – 1	11	1964
Camilla Rosatello	0 – 1	-	0 – 1	1	2017
Barbara Rossi	4 – 5	3 – 5	1 – 0	9	1979
Mara Santangelo	4 – 4	2 – 3	2 – 1	7	2005
Francesca Schiavone	27 – 22	23 – 21	4 – 1	25	2002
Adriana Serra Zanetti	9 – 7	7 – 4	2 – 3	11	1995
Antonella Serra Zanetti	1 – 3	1 – 2	0 – 1	3	2002
Sabina Simmonds	13 – 14	7 – 8	6 – 6	16	1978
Martina Trevisan	2 – 0	1 – 0	1 – 0	2	2017
Rosalba Vido	6 – 4	4 – 3	2 – 1	9	1972
Roberta Vinci	23 – 8	5 – 7	18 – 1	27	2001
Manuela Zoni	3 – 5	1 – 2	2 – 3	7	1975
