= List of Spain Fed Cup team representatives =

This is a list of tennis players who have represented the Spain Fed Cup team in an official Fed Cup match. Spain have taken part in the competition since 1972.

== Players ==
| Player | W-L (Total) | W-L (Singles) | W-L (Doubles) | Ties | Debut |
|---|---|---|---|---|---|
| Ana Almansa | 4 – 12 | 2 – 4 | 2 – 8 | 10 | 1982 |
| Mónica Álvarez de Mon | 5 – 6 | 5 – 3 | 0 – 3 | 9 | 1977 |
| Lara Arruabarrena | 3 – 4 | 2 – 4 | 1 – 0 | 4 | 2015 |
| Neus Ávila | 0 – 1 | - | 0 – 1 | 1 | 1995 |
| Vicky Baldovinos | 8 – 16 | 4 – 11 | 4 – 5 | 16 | 1974 |
| Rosa Bielsa | 1 – 1 | - | 1 – 1 | 2 | 1985 |
| Aliona Bolsova Zadoinov | 1 – 0 | - | 1 – 0 | 1 | 2015 |
| Lourdes Domínguez Lino | 7 – 8 | 4 – 6 | 3 – 2 | 12 | 2006 |
| Begoña Erana | 0 – 1 | - | 0 – 1 | 1 | 1982 |
| Ana María Estalella | 2 – 4 | 1 – 1 | 1 – 3 | 5 | 1972 |
| Georgina García Pérez | 1 – 1 | - | 1 – 1 | 2 | 2018 |
| Michelle Garth | 0 – 1 | 0 – 1 | - | 1 | 1984 |
| Elena Guerra | 1 – 3 | 0 – 2 | 1 – 1 | 4 | 1983 |
| Gala León García | 2 – 4 | 0 – 1 | 2 – 3 | 5 | 1996 |
| Nuria Llagostera Vives | 13 – 10 | 5 – 6 | 8 – 4 | 16 | 2005 |
| María José Llorca | 4 – 3 | 3 – 1 | 1 – 2 | 4 | 1986 |
| Carmen Mandarino | 3 – 9 | 1 – 4 | 2 – 5 | 9 | 1972 |
| Marta Marrero | 2 – 5 | 2 – 4 | 0 – 1 | 4 | 2002 |
| Conchita Martínez | 68 – 23 | 47 – 18 | 21 – 5 | 53 | 1988 |
| María José Martínez Sánchez | 9 – 7 | 6 – 3 | 3 – 4 | 11 | 2008 |
| Anabel Medina Garrigues | 18 – 16 | 10 – 13 | 8 – 3 | 21 | 2003 |
| Ángeles Montolio | 2 – 1 | 0 – 1 | 2 – 0 | 3 | 1994 |
| Isabel Moure | 1 – 0 | - | 1 – 0 | 1 | 1980 |
| Garbiñe Muguruza | 9 – 2 | 9 – 1 | 0 – 1 | 5 | 2015 |
| Arantxa Parra Santonja | 4 – 0 | 1 – 0 | 3 – 0 | 4 | 2005 |
| Beatriz Pellón | 3 – 6 | 1 – 1 | 2 – 5 | 7 | 1979 |
| Carmen Perea | 19 – 24 | 13 – 16 | 6 – 8 | 29 | 1973 |
| Pilar Pérez | 0 – 2 | - | 0 – 2 | 2 | 1990 |
| Noelia Pérez Peñate | 0 – 2 | - | 0 – 2 | 2 | 1992 |
| Laura Pous Tió | 0 – 1 | - | 0 – 1 | 1 | 2007 |
| Virginia Ruano Pascual | 15 – 17 | 0 – 4 | 15 – 13 | 31 | 1992 |
| Olga Sáez Larra | 0 – 1 | - | 0 – 1 | 1 | 2017 |
| María Sánchez Lorenzo | 3 – 7 | 2 – 3 | 1 – 4 | 11 | 1995 |
| Arantxa Sánchez Vicario | 72 – 28 | 50 – 22 | 22 – 6 | 58 | 1986 |
| Magüi Serna | 10 – 10 | 7 – 7 | 3 – 3 | 13 | 1997 |
| Sílvia Soler Espinosa | 4 – 10 | 4 – 8 | 0 – 2 | 8 | 2012 |
| Sara Sorribes Tormo | 3 – 2 | 1 – 2 | 2 – 0 | 4 | 2015 |
| Carla Suárez Navarro | 13 – 11 | 13 – 8 | 0 – 3 | 14 | 2008 |
| Cristina Torrens Valero | 3 – 3 | - | 3 – 3 | 6 | 1993 |
| María Teresa Torró Flor | 2 – 3 | 2 – 2 | 0 – 1 | 3 | 2013 |
