= Gláucia Langela =

Brazilian tennis player

- Country (sports): Brazil
- Born: 5 May 1954 (age 70)
- Plays: Right-handed

Singles

Grand Slam singles results
- French Open: Q3 (1980)
- Wimbledon: 2R (1981)
- US Open: Q1 (1980, 1982)

Gláucia Langela (born 5 May 1954) is a Brazilian former professional tennis player.

A right-handed player from Jundiaí, Langela featured in the main draw of the 1981 Wimbledon Championships and received a first round bye, before losing her second round match to Susan Leo in three sets.

Langela still lives in Jundiaí and runs a local tennis academy.
