= Ana Almansa =

Spanish tennis player (born 1963)

- Country (sports): Spain
- Born: 24 August 1963 (age 61); Valencia, Spain

Singles
- Career record: 2–5

Grand Slam singles results
- French Open: Q1 (1983)

Doubles
- Career record: 2–9
Medal record
Mediterranean Games
Gold medal – first place	1983 Casablanca	Women's Doubles

Ana Almansa Suárez (born 24 August 1963) is a Spanish former professional tennis player who won a gold medal at the 1983 Mediterranean Games.

From 1982 to 1986, she appeared in ten Federation Cup ties for Spain.

After retiring, she coached Conchita Martínez, among other players.

== See also ==
- List of Spain Fed Cup team representatives
