= Germaine Ohaco =

Chilean tennis player

- Country (sports): Chile
- Born: 8 December 1962 (age 62)
- Prize money: $10,524

Singles

Grand Slam singles results
- French Open: Q1 (1982, 1983)
- Wimbledon: Q1 (1982)
- US Open: 1R (1982)

Doubles

Grand Slam doubles results
- French Open: 1R (1983)
- US Open: 1R (1982, 1983)

Grand Slam mixed doubles results
- French Open: 2R (1982)
- US Open: 1R (1984)

Germaine Ohaco (born 8 December 1962) is a Chilean former professional tennis player.

Ohaco reached a best singles world ranking of 162 on the professional tour. She qualified for the singles main draw of the 1982 US Open and featured in three doubles rubbers for the Chile Federation Cup team in 1984.

Her niece, Dominique Ohaco, is an Olympic skier.
