= Cawston Ostrich Farm =

Los Angeles tourist attraction (1886–1935)

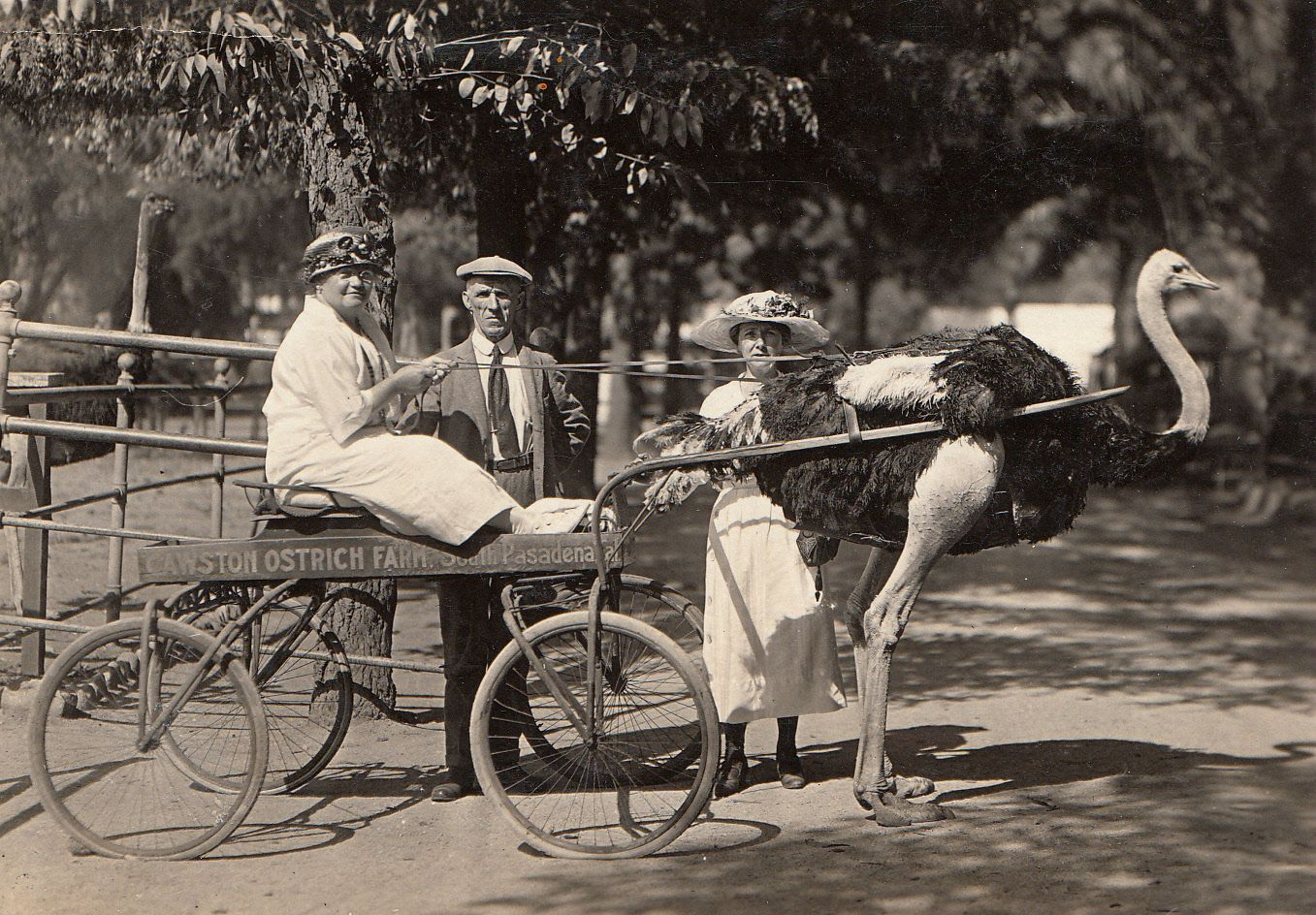
- Interactive map of Cawston Ostrich Farm
- Location: South Pasadena, California, U.S.
- Coordinates: 34°6′45″N 118°10′24″W
- Opened: 1896
- Closed: 1935
- Owner: Edwin Cawston

Cawston Ostrich Farm, located in South Pasadena, California, United States, was opened in 1886 by Edwin Cawston. It was one of America's first ostrich farms and was located in the Arroyo Seco Valley just three miles (5 km) north of downtown Los Angeles and occupied nine acres. In 1887, the company built Hollywood's first railway, linking the farm to Hollywood.

== Founding ==
In 1886, Edwin Cawston and E.P. Hoyle chartered a ship to take some of the best obtainable ostriches in the world from South Africa to Galveston, Texas, where it arrived on January 25, 1887. From there, the ostriches endured a treacherous train journey to Los Angeles, California. Out of the original fifty-two birds – 26 males and 26 females – forty-three survived. (Cawston's 1920 obituary claimed that there were 50 ostriches at the outset and only 18 survivors.) The farm was first established at the corner of Main Street and Washington Boulevard in Los Angeles. In 1888, it was relocated to Norwalk, California; at this point, Cawston had 34 birds. The farm was moved again to South Pasadena in 1896, where it reopened to the public that October 15 with no fewer than 200 ostriches in its stable.

== Tourism ==
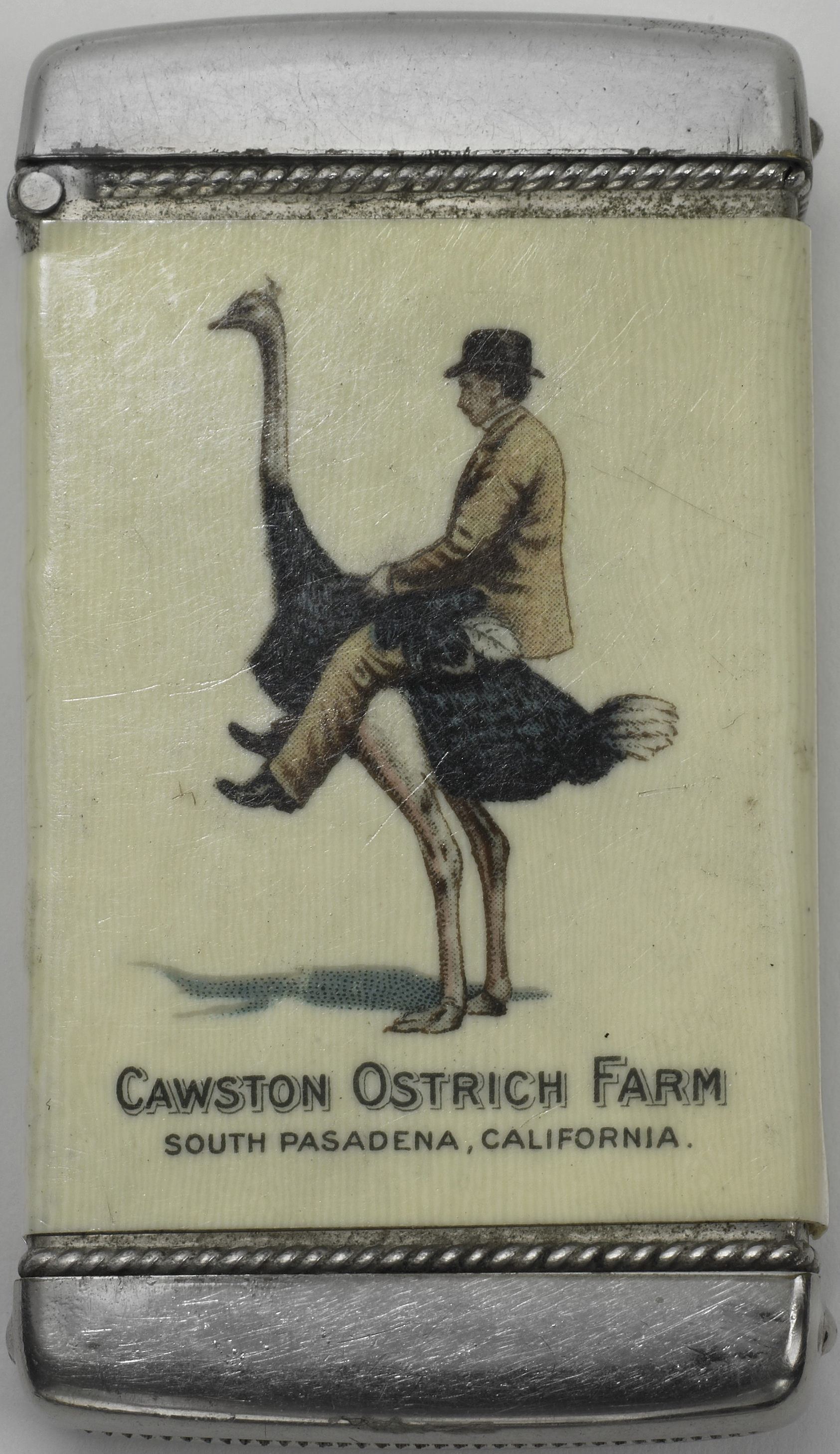
Matchsafe advertising about 1900

A young woman rides an ostrich while an older man guides it at Cawston Ostrich Farm, early 20th century

The Cawston Ostrich Farm became a premier tourist attraction for many years. Its proximity to the Pasadena and Los Angeles Electric Railway's trolley line that came through from downtown Los Angeles brought many tourists to visit the farm through the earlier part of the 20th century. Guests were able to ride on the backs of ostriches, be taken for ostrich drawn carriage rides and buy ostrich feathered hats, boas, capes and fans at the Ostrich Farm store that was connected to the factory. The ostrich farm feather products were shipped and sold throughout the world. The farm closed in 1935.

Most of the original brick structure of the factory and store remains today and is South Pasadena Cultural Landmark #18.

In 1910 there were 10 Ostrich Farms in Southern California.
