= Beatriz Pellón =

Spanish tennis player (born 1960)

- Country (sports): Spain
- Born: 15 September 1960 (age 65) Santander, Spain

Singles
- Career record: 1–2

Doubles
- Career record: 2–5
Medal record
Mediterranean Games
Silver medal – second place	1979 Split	Women's Doubles

Beatriz Pellón Fernández-Fontecha (born 15 September 1960) is a Spanish former professional tennis and field hockey player.

As a tennis player, she won a silver medal in doubles at the 1979 Mediterranean Games, partnering with Mónica Álvarez de Mon. From 1977 to 1984, she appeared in 7 Federation Cup ties for Spain and won three of her nine rubbers.

One of her brothers is field hockey Olympic medalist Juan Pellón.

== See also ==
- List of Spain Fed Cup team representatives
