= Kate Glancy =

British-Canadian tennis player

- Country (sports): (United Kingdom) Great Britain; Canada
- Born: 25 March 1960 (age 65)
- Plays: Left-handed

Singles

Grand Slam singles results
- French Open: Q2 (1981)
- Wimbledon: Q3 (1978)
- US Open: Q2 (1978)

Kate Glancy (born 25 March 1960) is a British-Canadian former professional tennis player.

Glancy, a left-handed player, moved to Canada in 1978 and was based in Abbotsford, British Columbia. She reached the final qualifying round at the 1978 Wimbledon Championships, while her best performances on the WTA Tour were second round appearances at both 1978 Brighton International and 1981 Japan Open.
