= Sonoe Yonezawa =

Japanese tennis player (born 1949)

- Country (sports): Japan
- Born: 29 August 1949 (age 76) Hiroshima, Japan
- Height: 156 cm (5 ft 1 in)

Singles

Grand Slam singles results
- French Open: Q2 (1978)
- Wimbledon: Q1 (1978)
- US Open: 2R (1978)

Sonoe Yonezawa (born 29 August 1949) is a Japanese former professional tennis player.

Born in Hiroshima, Yonezawa was active on tour during the 1970s and 1980s.

Yonezawa, a medalist at the 1978 Asian Games, was the 1978 All Japan singles champion and won the national title twice in doubles. She played Federation Cup tennis in 1979 and helped Japan win their World Group 1st round tie over Norway, but lost in three sets to Betty Stöve when they were eliminated in the next round by the Netherlands.

In her only grand slam main draw, Yonezawa fell to Peanut Harper in the second round of the 1978 US Open.

== See also ==
- List of Japan Fed Cup team representatives
