= Manuela Zoni =

Italian tennis player

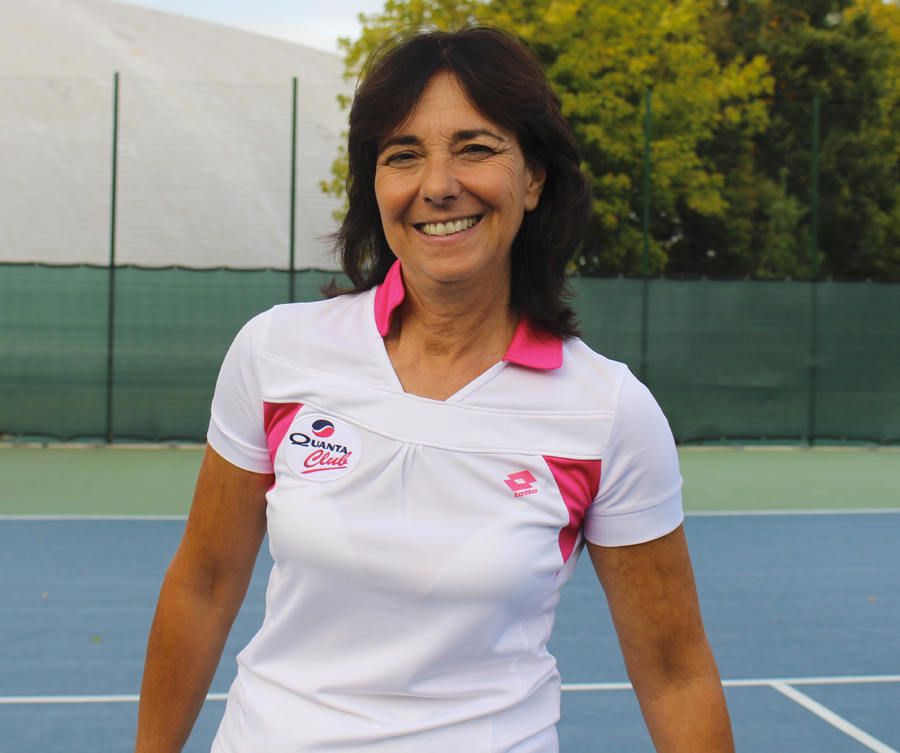
- Country (sports): Italy
- Born: 12 October 1960 (age 64)
- Plays: Right-handed

Singles

Grand Slam singles results
- French Open: Q2 (1977, 1978, 1980)

Manuela Zoni (born 12 October 1960) is an Italian former professional tennis player.

Zoni, a junior finalist at the 1976 French Open, competed for the Italy Federation Cup team during the late 1970s. Debuting at the age of 14, she remains the youngest player to have represented Italy in the competition. She featured in a total of seven ties and won three of her eight rubbers, one in singles and two in doubles.

== See also ==
- List of Italy Fed Cup team representatives
