= Noelia Pérez Peñate =

Spanish tennis player (born 1972)

- Full name: Noelia Pérez Peñate
- Country (sports): Spain
- Born: 6 December 1972 (age 52); Las Palmas, Spain
- Height: 1.73 m (5 ft 8 in)
- Turned pro: June 1991
- Plays: Right-handed
- Prize money: $52,773

Singles
- Highest ranking: No. 121 (3 August 1992)

Grand Slam singles results
- Australian Open: 1R (1993)
- US Open: 1R (1992)

Doubles
- Highest ranking: No. 165 (10 October 1994)

Noelia Pérez Peñate (born 6 December 1972) is a former professional tennis player from Spain.

== Biography ==
Pérez comes from Spain's Canary Islands and is the first person from the autonomous community to appear at grand slam level, having played at the Australian and US Open main draws.

In 1992 she featured in two doubles matches for the Spain Fed Cup team. Both matches, which Spain lost, were in dead rubbers, partnering Arantxa Sanchez Vicario against Belgium and Virginia Ruano Pascual in the quarter-final against Argentina. Spain finished the competition as runners-up.

Most of her appearances on tour came on the ITF circuit, but in 1993 she qualified for the doubles at Montpellier with Åsa Carlsson and the pair made the quarter-finals.

== ITF finals ==
=== Singles (0–5) ===
Legend
$50,000 / $60,000 tournaments
$25,000 tournaments
$10,000 / $15,000 tournaments

Outcome	No.	Date	Tournament	Surface	Opponent	Score
Runner-up	1.	29 July 1991	A Coruña, Spain	Clay	(France) Barbara Collet	3–6, 4–6
Runner-up	2.	8 December 1991	Le Havre, France	Clay	(Netherlands) Kristie Boogert	1–6, 4–6
Runner-up	3.	13 April 1992	Salerno, Italy	Clay	(Spain) Kateřina Šišková	2–6, 3–6
Runner-up	4.	11 July 1994	Vigo, Spain	Hard	(Spain) Silvia Ramón-Cortés	3–6, 1–6
Runner-up	5.	29 August 1994	Istanbul, Turkey	Hard	(Russia) Tatiana Panova	2–6, 2–6

=== Doubles (0–1) ===
Outcome	No.	Date	Tournament	Surface	Partner	Opponents	Score
Runner-up	1.	28 February 1994	Madrid, Spain	Clay	(Spain) Virginia Ruano Pascual	(Spain) Vanessa Castellano (Spain) Yolanda Clemot	6–2, 3–6, 1–6

== See also ==
- List of Spain Fed Cup team representatives
