= Helga Lütten =

German tennis player

- ITF name: Helga Luetten
- Country (sports): West Germany
- Born: 27 July 1961 (age 64)
- Plays: Right-handed

Singles

Grand Slam singles results
- Australian Open: 1R (1981)
- French Open: Q2 (1983)

Helga Lütten (born 27 July 1961) is a German former professional tennis player.

A right-handed player from Hamburg, Lütten was a junior quarter-finalist at the 1979 Wimbledon Championships.

During the early 1980s she competed on the professional tour and qualified for the main draw of one grand slam tournament, the 1981 Australian Open, where she was beaten in the first round by Betty Stöve.

She is now known by her married name Helga Nauck and plays on the ITF senior's circuit. In 2017 she won the World Championships for the 55 and over category.
