= Mónica Álvarez de Mon =

Spanish tennis player (born 1955)

- Country (sports): Spain
- Born: 19 December 1955 (age 69)

Singles
- Career record: 6–3

Grand Slam singles results
- French Open: Q1 (1977)
- Wimbledon Junior: QF (1972)

Doubles
- Career record: 0–4

Grand Slam doubles results
- French Open: 1R (1977)
Medal record
Mediterranean Games
Silver medal – second place	1979 Split	Women's Doubles
Bronze medal – third place	1979 Split	Women's Singles

Mónica Álvarez de Mon Olabarri (born 19 December 1955) is a Spanish former professional tennis player who won two medals at the 1979 Mediterranean Games.

From 1977 to 1980, she appeared in 9 Federation Cup ties for Spain. Together with Carmen Perea and Vicky Baldovinos, Álvarez de Mon became in 1979 one of the first three Spanish female tennis players to compete in Australia.

== See also ==
- List of Spain Fed Cup team representatives
