= Claudia Casabianca =

Argentine tennis player

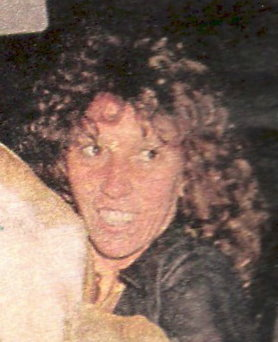
- Portrait of Claudia Casabianca
- Country (sports): Argentina
- Born: 21 March 1960 (age 65)

Singles

Grand Slam singles results
- French Open: 2R (1981)
- Wimbledon: 1R (1981)
- US Open: 2R (1978, 1980)

Doubles

Grand Slam doubles results
- French Open: 1R (1977, 1979)
- US Open: 1R (1978)

Mixed doubles

Grand Slam mixed doubles results
- French Open: 1R (1978, 1981)
- US Open: 2R (1978)

Claudia Casabianca (born 21 March 1960) is a retired professional tennis player from Argentina who played in Grand Slam tournaments in the 1970s and 1980s. At age 17, Casabianca won the girls' singles title at the 1977 US Open, becoming the first female Argentine player to win a tennis championship abroad.

== Junior Grand Slam finals ==
=== Singles: 1 (1 title) ===
Result	Year	Tournament	Surface	Opponent	Score
Win	1977	US Open	Hard	(United States) Lea Antonoplis	6–3, 2–6, 6–2

== Career finals ==
=== Singles (2–1) ===
Result	W-L	Date	Location	Surface	Opponent	Score
Win	1–0	Mar 1980	Rio de Janeiro, Brazil	Clay	(United States) Vicki Beggs	2–6, 6–3, 6–1
Loss	1–1	Apr 1980	Curitiba, Brazil	Clay	(Brazil) Patricia Medrado	6–3, 1–6, 3–6
Win	2–1	Apr 1980	Recife, Brazil	Clay	(Brazil) Patricia Medrado	6–1, 3–6, 6–2
