= 1990 Torneo Internazionale – Doubles =

Doubles
- 1990 Torneo Internazionale

Final
- Champions: (Italy) Laura Garrone (Luxembourg) Karin Kschwendt
- Runners-up: (Argentina) Florencia Labat (Italy) Barbara Romanò
- Score: 6–2, 6–4

Details
- Draw: 16
- Seeds: 4

Events
Singles	Doubles
Internazionali Femminili di Palermo	· 1991 →

This is the first edition of the tournament as part of the WTA Tour. Laura Garrone and Karin Kschwendt won the title by defeating Florencia Labat and Barbara Romanò 6–2, 6–4 in the final.

== Seeds ==
1. (Socialist Federal Republic of Yugoslavia) Sabrina Goleš / (Argentina) Patricia Tarabini (first round)
2. (Czechoslovakia) Petra Langrová / (Czechoslovakia) Jana Pospíšilová (quarterfinals)
3. (Czechoslovakia) Iva Budařová / (Czechoslovakia) Leona Lásková (semifinals)
4. (Italy) Laura Garrone / (Luxembourg) Karin Kschwendt (champions)

== Draw ==
=== Key ===
- Q = Qualifier
- WC = Wild card
- LL = Lucky loser
- Alt = Alternate
- SE = Special exempt
- PR = Protected ranking
- ITF = ITF entry
- JE = Junior exempt
- w/o = Walkover
- r = Retired
- d = Defaulted
- SR = Special ranking

=== Draw ===
First round
1	(Socialist Federal Republic of Yugoslavia) S Goleš (Argentina) P Tarabini	7	4	3
(Italy) C Nozzoli (New Zealand) C Toleafoa	5	6	6
(West Germany) C Hofmann (Venezuela) M Vento	7^{7}	6
(United States) Amy Alcini (West Germany) H Kadzidroga	6^{2}	2
4	(Italy) L Garrone (Luxembourg) K Kschwendt	6	6
(Italy) C Caverzasio (Italy) R Grande	0	3
(Austria) M Maruska (Austria) B Reinstadler	d
(Italy) S Farina (Italy) S Isidori
(Spain) R Bielsa (Spain) J Souto	d
(Italy) F Bonsignori (France) M Pierce
(Spain) V Ruano Pascual (Switzerland) E Zardo	2	2
3	(Czechoslovakia) I Budařová (Czechoslovakia) L Lásková	6	6
(Switzerland) C Cohen (Greece) A Kanellopoulou	2	2
(Argentina) F Labat (Italy) B Romanò	6	6
(Austria) B Paulus (Austria) P Ritter	6	4	1
2	(Czechoslovakia) P Langrová (Czechoslovakia) J Pospíšilová	3	6	6

Quarterfinals
(Italy) C Nozzoli (New Zealand) C Toleafoa	6	1	3
(West Germany) C Hofmann (Venezuela) M Vento	0	6	6
4	(Italy) L Garrone (Luxembourg) K Kschwendt	6	6
(Italy) S Farina (Italy) S Isidori	2	2
(Italy) F Bonsignori (France) M Pierce	4	6	6^{5}
3	(Czechoslovakia) I Budařová (Czechoslovakia) L Lásková	6	2	7^{7}
(Argentina) F Labat (Italy) B Romanò	4	6	6
2	(Czechoslovakia) P Langrová (Czechoslovakia) J Pospíšilová	6	2	2

Semifinals
(West Germany) C Hofmann (Venezuela) M Vento	3	4
4	(Italy) L Garrone (Luxembourg) K Kschwendt	6	6
3	(Czechoslovakia) I Budařová (Czechoslovakia) L Lásková	4	6^{3}
(Argentina) F Labat (Italy) B Romanò	6	7^{7}

Final
4	(Italy) L Garrone (Luxembourg) K Kschwendt	6	6
(Argentina) F Labat (Italy) B Romanò	2	4
