= 1985 Italian Open – Women's doubles =

Women's doubles
- 1985 Italian Open

Final
- Champions: (Italy) Sandra Cecchini (Italy) Raffaella Reggi
- Runners-up: (Italy) Patrizia Murgo (Italy) Barbara Romanò
- Score: 1–6, 6–4, 6–3

Details
- Draw: 16
- Seeds: 4

Events
Singles	men	women
Doubles	men	women
← 1984 ·	Italian Open	· 1986 →

Iva Budařová and Helena Suková were the defending champions, but Suková did not compete this year. Budařová teamed up with Marcela Skuherská and lost in the first round to Andrea Holíková and Lea Plchová.

Sandra Cecchini and Raffaella Reggi won the title by defeating Patrizia Murgo and Barbara Romanò 1–6, 6–4, 6–3 in the final.

== Seeds ==
1. (United States) Jamie Golder / (United States) Vicki Nelson-Dunbar (quarterfinals)
2. (Czechoslovakia) Iva Budařová / (Czechoslovakia) Marcela Skuherská (first round)
3. (United States) Penny Barg / (Argentina) Adriana Villagrán (quarterfinals)
4. (Sweden) Catrin Jexell / (West Germany) Myriam Schropp (quarterfinals)

== Draw ==
=== Key ===
- Q = Qualifier
- WC = Wild card
- LL = Lucky loser
- Alt = Alternate
- ITF = ITF entry
- PR = Protected ranking
- SR = Special ranking
- SE = Special exempt
- JE = Junior exempt
- JR = Junior Accelerator Programme entrant
- CO = College Accelerator Programme entrant
- NG = Next Gen Accelerator Program entrant
- w/o = Walkover
- r = Retired
- d = Defaulted

=== Draw ===
First Round
1	(United States) J Golder (United States) V Nelson-Dunbar	6	2	6
(West Germany) C Lechner (Switzerland) M Weber-Koszto	2	6	3
(Italy) S Cecchini (Italy) R Reggi	6	6
(Peru) M-E Castro (Brazil) L Corsato-Owsianka	2	2
4	(Sweden) C Jexell (West Germany) M Schropp	6	4	6
(France) M-C Calleja (Switzerland) S Schmid	3	6	1
(France) I Demongeot (France) N Tauziat	6	6
(Sweden) C Anderholm (Sweden) H Dahlström	3	3
(Czechoslovakia) H Fukárková (Germany) R Tomanová	0	2
(Italy) P Murgo (Italy) B Romanò	6	6
(United States) E Longo (Italy) S Simmonds	4	3
3	(United States) P Barg (Argentina) A Villagrán	6	6
(Czechoslovakia) Y Brzáková (Czechoslovakia) K Skronská	2	4
(France) N Herreman (Greece) A Kanellopoulou	6	6
(Czechoslovakia) A Holíková (Czechoslovakia) L Plchová	4	6	6
2	(Czechoslovakia) I Budařová (Czechoslovakia) M Skuherská	6	0	1

Quarterfinals
1	(United States) J Golder (United States) V Nelson-Dunbar	2	3
(Italy) S Cecchini (Italy) R Reggi	6	6
4	(Sweden) C Jexell (West Germany) M Schropp	4	5
(France) I Demongeot (France) N Tauziat	6	7
(Italy) P Murgo (Italy) B Romanò	6	6	6
3	(United States) P Barg (Argentina) A Villagrán	7	1	2
(France) N Herreman (Greece) A Kanellopoulou	6	6
(Czechoslovakia) A Holíková (Czechoslovakia) L Plchová	7	7

Semifinals
(Italy) S Cecchini (Italy) R Reggi	6	6
(France) I Demongeot (France) N Tauziat	3	2
(Italy) P Murgo (Italy) B Romanò	6	7
(Czechoslovakia) A Holíková (Czechoslovakia) L Plchová	1	6

Final
(Italy) S Cecchini (Italy) R Reggi	1	6	6
(Italy) P Murgo (Italy) B Romanò	6	4	3
