= 1990 Torneo Internazionale – Singles =

Singles
- 1990 Torneo Internazionale

Final
- Champion: (West Germany) Isabel Cueto
- Runner-up: (Austria) Barbara Paulus
- Score: 6–2, 6–3

Details
- Draw: 32 (1WC / 4Q)
- Seeds: 8

Events
Singles	Doubles
Internazionali Femminili di Palermo	· 1991 →

This is the first edition of the tournament as part of the WTA Tour. Isabel Cueto won the inaugural title by defeating Barbara Paulus 6–2, 6–3 in the final.

== Seeds ==
1. (Austria) Barbara Paulus (final)
2. (West Germany) Isabel Cueto (champion)
3. (Italy) Cathy Caverzasio (quarterfinals)
4. (Italy) Laura Lapi (first round)
5. (Greece) Angeliki Kanellopoulou (first round)
6. (Argentina) ~~Patricia Tarabini~~ (withdrew)
7. (Czechoslovakia) Petra Langrová (first round)
8. (Argentina) Florencia Labat (first round)

== Draw ==
=== Key ===
- Q = Qualifier
- WC = Wild card
- LL = Lucky loser
- Alt = Alternate
- ITF = ITF entry
- PR = Protected ranking
- SR = Special ranking
- SE = Special exempt
- JE = Junior exempt
- JR = Junior Accelerator Programme entrant
- CO = College Accelerator Programme entrant
- NG = Next Gen Accelerator Program entrant
- w/o = Walkover
- r = Retired
- d = Defaulted

=== Finals ===
Semifinals
1	(Austria) Barbara Paulus	6	2	6
Q	(Italy) Francesca Romano	2	6	1
(Austria) Beate Reinstadler	1	1
2	(West Germany) Isabel Cueto	6	6

Final
1	(Austria) Barbara Paulus	2	3
2	(West Germany) Isabel Cueto	6	6

=== Top half ===
First round
1	(Austria) B Paulus	7^{7}	7
(France) M Pierce	6^{1}	5
WC	(Italy) S Farina	6	6
(Italy) B Romanò	3	1
(Switzerland) E Zardo	7^{7}	3	6
Q	(West Germany) H Kadzidroga	6^{5}	6	2
(Switzerland) C Cohen	7^{10}	6
7	(Czechoslovakia) P Langrová	6^{8}	4
4	(Italy) L Lapi	4	1
(Italy) K Piccolini	6	6
(Socialist Federal Republic of Yugoslavia) S Goleš	6
(Austria) M Maruska	4	r
(Italy) N Baudone	6	6
(Czechoslovakia) I Budařová	3	3
Q	(Spain) R Bielsa	4	5
LL	(Italy) F Romano	6	7

Second round
1	(Austria) B Paulus	3	6	6
WC	(Italy) S Farina	6	4	2
(Switzerland) E Zardo	6	6
(Switzerland) C Cohen	3	3
(Italy) K Piccolini	6	6
(Socialist Federal Republic of Yugoslavia) S Goleš	2	1
(Italy) N Baudone	6	2	3
LL	(Italy) F Romano	1	6	6

Quarterfinals
1	(Austria) B Paulus	6	6
(Switzerland) E Zardo	3	4
(Italy) K Piccolini	6	4	4
LL	(Italy) F Romano	0	6	6

Semifinals
1	(Austria) B Paulus	6	2	6
LL	(Italy) F Romano	2	6	1

=== Bottom half ===
First round
5	(Greece) A Kanellopoulou	4	2
(Italy) F Bonsignori	6	6
(Austria) B Reinstadler	3	6	7^{7}
(Luxembourg) K Kschwendt	6	4	6^{2}
LL	(Italy) C Nozzoli	6^{7}	1
(New Zealand) C Toleafoa	7^{9}	6
(Czechoslovakia) J Pospíšilová	5	0
3	(Italy) C Caverzasio	7	6
8	(Argentina) F Labat	4	1
(Italy) L Garrone	6	6
(Italy) S La Fratta	3	0
(France) M Laval	6	6
Q	(Netherlands) P Kamstra	7^{7}	4	3
(Czechoslovakia) L Lásková	6^{4}	6	6
(Austria) P Ritter	1	6^{5}
2	(West Germany) I Cueto	6	7^{7}

Second round
(Italy) F Bonsignori	1	6	3
(Austria) B Reinstadler	6	2	6
(New Zealand) C Toleafoa	2	3
3	(Italy) C Caverzasio	6	6
(Italy) L Garrone	3	4
(France) M Laval	6	6
(Czechoslovakia) L Lásková	4	7^{7}	1
2	(West Germany) I Cueto	6	6^{3}	6

Quarterfinals
(Austria) B Reinstadler	6	4	7^{7}
3	(Italy) C Caverzasio	3	6	6^{4}
(France) M Laval	4	1
2	(West Germany) I Cueto	6	6

Semifinals
(Austria) B Reinstadler	1	1
2	(West Germany) I Cueto	6	6
