= 2021 Upper Austria Ladies Linz – Singles =

Singles
- 2021 Upper Austria Ladies Linz

Final
- Champion: (United States) Alison Riske
- Runner-up: (Romania) Jaqueline Cristian
- Score: 2–6, 6–2, 7–5

Details
- Draw: 28
- Seeds: 8

Events
Singles	Doubles
← 2020 ·	Linz Open	· 2023 →

Alison Riske won the title, defeating Jaqueline Cristian in the final, 2–6, 6–2, 7–5.

Aryna Sabalenka was the defending champion, but she qualified to compete at the WTA Finals instead.

== Seeds ==
The top four seeds received a bye into the second round.

1. (United Kingdom) Emma Raducanu (second round)
2. (Romania) Simona Halep (semifinals, withdrew)
3. (United States) Danielle Collins (semifinals, retired due to shoulder injury)
4. (Russia) Veronika Kudermetova (quarterfinals)
5. (Russia) Ekaterina Alexandrova (first round)
6. (Romania) Sorana Cîrstea (withdrew)
7. (Italy) Jasmine Paolini (quarterfinals)
8. (United States) Alison Riske (champion)

== Draw ==
=== Key ===
- Q = Qualifier
- WC = Wild card
- LL = Lucky loser
- Alt = Alternate
- SE = Special exempt
- PR = Protected ranking
- ITF = ITF entry
- JE = Junior exempt
- w/o = Walkover
- r = Retired
- d = Defaulted
- SR = Special ranking

=== Finals ===
Semifinals
8	(United States) Alison Riske	7	0
3	(United States) Danielle Collins	5	0^{r}
LL	(Romania) Jaqueline Cristian	w/o
2/WC	(Romania) Simona Halep

Final
8	(United States) Alison Riske	2	6	7
LL	(Romania) Jaqueline Cristian	6	2	5

=== Top half ===
First round
Q	(Ukraine) K Kozlova	6	2	3
Q	(China) Xin Wang	2	6	6
(France) A Cornet	7^{9}	6
WC	(Austria) J Grabher	6^{7}	4
PR	(Germany) M Barthel	3	1
8	(United States) A Riske	6	6
(Belgium) G Minnen	6	6
(France) O Dodin	4	3
(Belgium) A Van Uytvanck	6	6
WC	(Austria) S Kraus	1	0
Q	(Ukraine) L Tsurenko	6	7^{7}
5	(Russia) E Alexandrova	4	6^{2}

Second round
1/WC	(United Kingdom) E Raducanu	1	7^{7}	5
Q	(China) Xin Wang	6	6^{0}	7
(France) A Cornet	4	4
8	(United States) A Riske	6	6
3	(United States) D Collins	6	6
(Belgium) G Minnen	1	2
(Belgium) A Van Uytvanck	6	6
Q	(Ukraine) L Tsurenko	0	3

Quarterfinals
Q	(China) Xin Wang	3	5
8	(United States) A Riske	6	7
3	(United States) D Collins	7	6
(Belgium) A Van Uytvanck	5	3

Semifinals
8	(United States) A Riske	7	0
3	(United States) D Collins	5	0^{r}

=== Bottom half ===
First round
LL	(Romania) J Cristian	2	6	7
(Russia) K Rakhimova	6	2	5
Q	(France) H Tan	2	4
(Sweden) R Peterson	6	6
(Ukraine) A Kalinina	6	6
(Italy) M Trevisan	3	4
7	(Italy) J Paolini	6	3	6
(Ukraine) D Yastremska	4	6	2
(France) C Burel	4	1
(China) S Zheng	6	6
(France) F Ferro	2	6	2
(Belarus) A Sasnovich	6	3	6

Second round
LL	(Romania) J Cristian	5
(Sweden) R Peterson	2^{r}
(Ukraine) A Kalinina	6	4	2
4	(Russia) V Kudermetova	4	6	6
7	(Italy) J Paolini	6	2	6
(China) S Zheng	1	6	4
(Belarus) A Sasnovich	5	3
2/WC	(Romania) S Halep	7	6

Quarterfinals
LL	(Romania) J Cristian	6	7^{7}
4	(Russia) V Kudermetova	2	6^{5}
7	(Italy) J Paolini	6	5	0
2/WC	(Romania) S Halep	4	7	6

Semifinals
LL	(Romania) J Cristian	w/o
2/WC	(Romania) S Halep

== Qualifying ==
=== Seeds ===
1. (Romania) Jaqueline Cristian (qualifying competition, lucky loser)
2. (China) Wang Xinyu (qualified)
3. (Romania) Ana Bogdan (qualifying competition)
4. (France) Harmony Tan (qualified)
5. (Slovakia) Kristína Kučová (qualifying competition)
6. (Bulgaria) Viktoriya Tomova (first round)
7. (Ukraine) Lesia Tsurenko (qualified)
8. (Russia) Kamilla Rakhimova (moved to main draw)

=== Qualifiers ===
1. (Ukraine) Lesia Tsurenko
2. (China) Wang Xinyu
3. (Ukraine) Kateryna Kozlova
4. (France) Harmony Tan

=== Lucky loser ===
1. (Romania) Jaqueline Cristian

==== First qualifier ====
First round
1	(Romania) Jaqueline Cristian	6	6
PR	(Russia) Irina Khromacheva	3	2
PR	(Luxembourg) Mandy Minella	2	1
7	(Ukraine) Lesia Tsurenko	6	6

Qualifying competition
1	(Romania) Jaqueline Cristian	7	4	1
7	(Ukraine) Lesia Tsurenko	5	6	6

==== Second qualifier ====
First round
2	(China) Wang Xinyu	6	6
(Russia) Anastasia Gasanova	2	2
WC	(Austria) Mavie Österreicher	5	6^{1}
Alt	(Switzerland) Leonie Küng	7	7^{7}

Qualifying competition
2	(China) Wang Xinyu	4	6	6
Alt	(Switzerland) Leonie Küng	6	2	3

==== Third qualifier ====
First round
3	(Romania) Ana Bogdan	6	4	7^{7}
WC	(Germany) Eva Lys	4	6	6^{4}
PR	(Ukraine) Kateryna Kozlova	6	2	6
6	(Bulgaria) Viktoriya Tomova	1	6	2

Qualifying competition
3	(Romania) Ana Bogdan	6^{2}	4
PR	(Ukraine) Kateryna Kozlova	7^{7}	6

==== Fourth qualifier ====
First round
4	(France) Harmony Tan	6	6
(Serbia) Aleksandra Krunić	4	1
(Romania) Mihaela Buzărnescu	2	7^{7}	3
5	(Slovakia) Kristína Kučová	6	6^{4}	6

Qualifying competition
4	(France) Harmony Tan	5	6	6
5	(Slovakia) Kristína Kučová	7	3	4
