= 2023 Upper Austria Ladies Linz – Doubles =

Doubles
- 2023 Upper Austria Ladies Linz

Final
- Champions: (Georgia (country)) Natela Dzalamidze (Slovakia) Viktória Kužmová
- Runners-up: (Germany) Anna-Lena Friedsam (Ukraine) Nadiia Kichenok
- Score: 4–6, 7–5, [12–10]

Details
- Draw: 16
- Seeds: 4

Events
Singles	Doubles
← 2021 ·	Linz Open	· 2024 →

Defending champion Natela Dzalamidze and her partner Viktória Kužmová defeated Anna-Lena Friedsam and Nadiia Kichenok in the final, 4–6, 7–5, [12–10] to win the doubles tennis title at the 2023 Linz Open.

Dzalamidze and Kamilla Rakhimova were the defending champions from 2021, when the event was last held, but chose to compete with different partners. Rakhimova partnered Yana Sizikova, but lost in the first round to Dzalamidze and Kužmová.

== Seeds ==
1. Alexandra Panova / (United States) Alycia Parks (semifinals)
2. (Czech Republic) Anastasia Dețiuc / (Czech Republic) Miriam Kolodziejová (first round)
3. Kamilla Rakhimova / Yana Sizikova (first round)
4. (United States) Kaitlyn Christian / (United States) Sabrina Santamaria (semifinals)

== Draw ==
Key

- Q = Qualifier
- WC = Wild card
- LL = Lucky loser
- Alt = Alternate
- ITF = ITF entry
- PR = Protected ranking
- SR = Special ranking
- SE = Special exempt
- JE = Junior exempt
- JR = Junior Accelerator Programme entrant
- CO = College Accelerator Programme entrant
- NG = Next Gen Accelerator Program entrant
- w/o = Walkover
- r = Retired
- d = Defaulted

=== Draw ===
First round
1	A Panova (United States) A Parks	7^{7}	6
(Brazil) I Gamarra Martins (United States) A Kulikov	6^{1}	4
(Netherlands) B Schoofs (Belgium) K Zimmermann	6	6
(Czech Republic) J Malečková (Netherlands) R van der Hoek	2	4
3	K Rakhimova; Y Sizikova	2	0
(Georgia (country)) N Dzalamidze (Slovakia) V Kužmová	6	6
WC	(Austria) V Bokor (Austria) A Michalitsch	2	0
PR	(Venezuela) A Gámiz (Spain) G García Pérez	6	6
(Spain) M Bassols Ribera (Romania) J Cristian	6^{1}	4
(Hungary) D Gálfi (Georgia (country)) O Kalashnikova	7^{7}	6
E Alexandrova (Germany) V Heisen	5	2
4	(United States) K Christian (United States) S Santamaria	7	6
(Germany) A-L Friedsam (Ukraine) N Kichenok	6	7
WC	(Austria) M Klaffner (Austria) S Kraus	3	5
(China) X Han; L Marozava	3	7^{7}	[10]
2	(Czech Republic) A Dețiuc (Czech Republic) M Kolodziejová	6	6^{5}	[3]

Quarterfinals
1	A Panova (United States) A Parks	4	6	[10]
(Netherlands) B Schoofs (Belgium) K Zimmermann	6	1	[6]
(Georgia (country)) N Dzalamidze (Slovakia) V Kužmová	7	6
PR	(Venezuela) A Gámiz (Spain) G García Pérez	5	2
(Hungary) D Gálfi (Georgia (country)) O Kalashnikova	6^{4}	4
4	(United States) K Christian (United States) S Santamaria	7^{7}	6
(Germany) A-L Friedsam (Ukraine) N Kichenok	6	6
(China) X Han; L Marozava	3	1

Semifinals
1	A Panova (United States) A Parks	3	2
(Georgia (country)) N Dzalamidze (Slovakia) V Kužmová	6	6
4	(United States) K Christian (United States) S Santamaria	5	6^{3}
(Germany) A-L Friedsam (Ukraine) N Kichenok	7	7^{7}

Final
(Georgia (country)) N Dzalamidze (Slovakia) V Kužmová	4	7	[12]
(Germany) A-L Friedsam (Ukraine) N Kichenok	6	5	[10]
