= 2021 Upper Austria Ladies Linz =

- Date: 6–12 November
- Edition: 31st
- Category: WTA 250
- Draw: 28S / 16D
- Prize money: $235,238
- Surface: Hard (Indoor) - (DecoTurf)
- Location: Linz, Austria
- Venue: TipsArena Linz

Champions

Singles
- (United States) Alison Riske

Doubles
- (Russia) Natela Dzalamidze / (Russia) Kamilla Rakhimova
← 2020 ·	Linz Open	· 2023 →

The 2021 Upper Austria Ladies Linz was a women's tennis tournament played on indoor hard courts. It was the 31st edition of the Linz Open, and was part of the WTA 250 series of the 2021 WTA Tour. It was held at the TipsArena Linz in Linz, Austria, from 6 November until 12 November 2021. Eighth-seeded Alison Riske won the singles title.

== Finals ==
=== Singles ===
- (United States) Alison Riske defeated (Romania) Jaqueline Cristian, 2–6, 6–2, 7–5.

This was Riske's third WTA Tour title, and first of the year.

=== Doubles ===
- (Russia) Natela Dzalamidze / (Russia) Kamilla Rakhimova defeated (China) Wang Xinyu / (China) Zheng Saisai 6–4, 6–2

== Points and prize money ==
=== Point distribution ===
Event	W	F	SF	QF	Round of 16	Round of 32	Q	Q2	Q1
Singles	280	180	110	60	30	1	18	12	1
Doubles	280	180	110	60	1	—	—	—	—

=== Prize money ===
Event	W	F	SF	QF	Round of 16	Round of 32^{1}	Q2	Q1
Singles	$43,000	$21,400	$11,500	$6,175	$3,400	$2,100	$1,020	$600
Doubles *	$12,300	$6,400	$3,435	$1,820	$960	—	—	—

_{^{1} Qualifiers prize money is also the Round of 32 prize money}
_{* per team}

== Singles entrants ==
=== Seeds ===
Country	Player	Rank^{1}	Seed
GBR	Emma Raducanu	21	1
ROU	Simona Halep	22	2
USA	Danielle Collins	30	3
RUS	Veronika Kudermetova	31	4
RUS	Ekaterina Alexandrova	32	5
~~ROU~~	~~Sorana Cîrstea~~	~~38~~	~~6~~
ITA	Jasmine Paolini	51	7
USA	Alison Riske	52	8

- Rankings as of November 1, 2021

=== Other entrants ===
The following players received wildcards into the singles main draw:

- (Austria) Julia Grabher
- (Romania) Simona Halep
- (Austria) Sinja Kraus
- (United Kingdom) Emma Raducanu

The following player received entry using a protected ranking:

- (Germany) Mona Barthel

The following players received entry from the qualifying draw:

- (Ukraine) Kateryna Kozlova
- (France) Harmony Tan
- (Ukraine) Lesia Tsurenko
- (China) Wang Xinyu

The following player received entry as lucky loser:

- (Romania) Jaqueline Cristian

=== Withdrawals ===
Before the tournament

- (Romania) Irina-Camelia Begu → replaced by (Belarus) Aliaksandra Sasnovich
- (Romania) Sorana Cîrstea → replaced by (Romania) Jaqueline Cristian
- (France) Caroline Garcia → replaced by (China) Zheng Saisai
- (Switzerland) Viktorija Golubic → replaced by (Germany) Mona Barthel
- (Estonia) Kaia Kanepi → replaced by (Belgium) Greet Minnen
- (Ukraine) Marta Kostyuk → replaced by (France) Fiona Ferro
- (United States) Ann Li → replaced by (France) Clara Burel
- (Croatia) Petra Martić → replaced by (Russia) Kamilla Rakhimova
- (Colombia) Camila Osorio → replaced by (Sweden) Rebecca Peterson
- (Australia) Ajla Tomljanović → replaced by (France) Océane Dodin
- (China) Zhang Shuai → replaced by (Ukraine) Dayana Yastremska

== Doubles entrants ==
=== Seeds ===
Country	Player	Country	Player	Rank^{1}	Seed
GER	Julia Lohoff	CZE	Renata Voráčová	154	1
GEO	Oksana Kalashnikova	JPN	Miyu Kato	161	2
RUS	Natela Dzalamidze	RUS	Kamilla Rakhimova	171	3
POL	Alicja Rosolska	NZL	Erin Routliffe	175	4

- ^{1} Rankings as of November 1, 2021

=== Other entrants ===
The following pair received a wildcard into the doubles main draw:

- (Austria) Julia Grabher / (Austria) Sinja Kraus

The following pairs received entry using protected rankings:

- (Germany) Mona Barthel / (Chinese Taipei) Hsieh Yu-chieh
- (Russia) Irina Khromacheva / (Belarus) Lidziya Marozava
