= Gabriela Dinu =

German tennis player

- Full name: Gabriela Groell-Dinu
- Country (sports): West Germany
- Born: 16 April 1960 (age 65)
- Prize money: $47,387

Singles
- Career record: 57–62
- Career titles: 4 ETA/ITF
- Highest ranking: No. 123 (6 July 1987)

Grand Slam singles results
- French Open: 3R (1985)

Doubles
- Career record: 13–22
- Career titles: 3 ETA/ITF

Gabriela Groell-Dinu (born 16 April 1960) is a German former professional tennis player.

Originally from Romania, Dinu played on the professional tour in the 1980s, representing West Germany. She featured in the French Open main draw three times, with her best performance coming as a qualifier in 1985, when she qualified and reached the third round. In 1987, she reached her best ranking of 123 in the world.

== ETA/ITF finals ==
Legend
$25,000 tournaments
$10,000 tournaments

=== Singles (4–2) ===
Result	No.	Date	Tournament	Surface	Opponent	Score
Loss	1.	26 May 1980	Hamburg, West Germany	Clay	(West Germany) Katja Ebbinghaus	2–6, 0–6
Win	2.	17 August 1980	Dachau, West Germany	Clay	(Czechoslovakia) Marie Pinterová	6–3, 5–7, 6–2
Loss	3.	25 April 1982	Catania, Italy	Clay	(Bulgaria) Manuela Maleeva	3–6, 1–6
Win	4.	15 October 1984	Haifa, Israel	Clay	(West Germany) Sabine Hack	3–6, 7–5, 6–4
Win	5.	22 October 1984	Eilat, Israel	Hard	(West Germany) Isabel Cueto	4–6, 7–5, 6–2
Win	6.	17 August 1987	Manhasset, United States	Clay	(Netherlands) Marianne van der Torre	7–6, 6–3

=== Doubles (3–4) ===
Result	No.	Date	Tournament	Surface	Partner	Opponents	Score
Loss	1.	26 May 1980	Hamburg, West Germany	Clay	(Austria) Andrea Pesak	(West Germany) Helga Masthoff (West Germany) Katja Ebbinghaus	3–6, 6–2, 4–6
Win	2.	3 May 1981	Bari, Italy	Clay	(Austria) Andrea Pesak	(Switzerland) Susana Maria Villaverde (Switzerland) Karin Stampfli	6–1, 6–2
Loss	3.	13 December 1981	Neumünster, West Germany	Clay	(West Germany) Heidi Eisterlehner	(West Germany) Claudia Kohde-Kilsch (West Germany) Eva Pfaff	6–7, 6–7
Loss	4.	18 April 1982	Catania, Italy	Clay	(Switzerland) Karin Stampfli	(Sweden) Elisabeth Ekblom (Sweden) Lena Sandin	2–6, 6–4, 2–6
Win	5.	11 July 1983	Båstad, Sweden	Clay	(Italy) Patrizia Murgo	(Sweden) Catarina Lindqvist (Sweden) Maria Lindström	6–2, 4–6, 6–4
Loss	6.	15 April 1985	Caserta, Italy	Clay	(Italy) Sabina Simmonds	(Italy) Patrizia Murgo (Italy) Barbara Romanò	6–4, 5–7, 4–6
Win	7.	18 July 1988	Rheda-Wiedenbrück, West Germany	Clay	(Greece) Alice Danila	(West Germany) Henrike Kadzidroga (New Zealand) Claudine Toleafoa	1–6, 6–2, 7–6
