= 1985 Italian Open (tennis) =

- Date: 13–19 May (men); 28 April – 5 May (women)
- Edition: 42nd
- Prize money: $350,000 (men) $50,000 (women)
- Surface: Clay / outdoor
- Location: Rome, Italy (men); Taranto, Italy (women)
- Venue: Foro Italico

Champions

Men's singles
- (France) Yannick Noah

Women's singles
- (Italy) Raffaella Reggi

Men's doubles
- (France) Guy Forget / (France) Yannick Noah

Women's doubles
- (Italy) Sandra Cecchini / (Italy) Raffaella Reggi
- Italian Open

The 1985 Italian Open was a tennis tournament played on outdoor clay courts at the Foro Italico in Rome in Italy that was part of the 1985 Nabisco Grand Prix and of 1985 Virginia Slims World Championship Series. The men's tournament was held from 13 to 18 May 1985, while the women's tournament was held from 28 April through 5 May 1985. Yannick Noah and Raffaella Reggi won the singles titles. Reggi also won the women's double partnering with Sandra Cecchini.

== Finals ==
=== Men's singles ===
(France) Yannick Noah defeated (Czechoslovakia) Miloslav Mečíř 6–4, 3–6, 6–2, 7–6^{(7–4)}

- It was Noah's 1st singles title of the year and the 15th of his career.

=== Women's singles ===
(Italy) Raffaella Reggi defeated (United States) Vicki Nelson-Dunbar 6–4, 6–4

- It was Reggi's only singles title of the year and the 1st of her career.

=== Men's doubles ===
(Sweden) Anders Järryd / (Sweden) Mats Wilander defeated (United States) Ken Flach / (United States) Robert Seguso 4–6, 6–3, 6–2

=== Women's doubles ===
(Italy) Sandra Cecchini / (Italy) Raffaella Reggi defeated (Italy) Patrizia Murgo / (Italy) Barbara Romanò 1–6, 6–4, 6–3
