= 1985 Italian Open – Men's doubles =

Men's doubles
- 1985 Italian Open

Final
- Champions: (Sweden) Anders Järryd (Sweden) Mats Wilander
- Runners-up: (United States) Ken Flach (United States) Robert Seguso
- Score: 4–6, 6–3, 6–2

Details
- Draw: 32 (2WC)
- Seeds: 8

Events
Singles	men	women
Doubles	men	women
- Italian Open

Ken Flach and Robert Seguso were the defending champions, but lost in the final to Anders Järryd and Mats Wilander. The score was 4–6, 6–3, 6–2.

== Seeds ==
1. (Czechoslovakia) Pavel Složil / (Czechoslovakia) Tomáš Šmíd (second round)
2. (United States) Ken Flach / (United States) Robert Seguso (final)
3. (Sweden) Anders Järryd / (Sweden) Mats Wilander (champions)
4. (Australia) Wally Masur / (Australia) Paul McNamee (second round)
5. (Australia) Mark Edmondson / (Australia) Kim Warwick (quarterfinals)
6. (Paraguay) Francisco González / (South Africa) Christo van Rensburg (first round)
7. (Chile) Hans Gildemeister / (Ecuador) Andrés Gómez (second round)
8. (Germany) Boris Becker / (France) Yannick Noah (quarterfinals, withdrew)

== Draw ==
Key

- Q = Qualifier
- WC = Wild card
- LL = Lucky loser
- Alt = Alternate
- ITF = ITF entry
- PR = Protected ranking
- SR = Special ranking
- SE = Special exempt
- JE = Junior exempt
- JR = Junior Accelerator Programme entrant
- CO = College Accelerator Programme entrant
- NG = Next Gen Accelerator Program entrant
- w/o = Walkover
- r = Retired
- d = Defaulted

=== Finals ===
Semifinals
(Italy) Paolo Canè (Italy) Simone Colombo	4	3
3	(Sweden) Anders Järryd (Sweden) Mats Wilander	6	6
(Czechoslovakia) Libor Pimek (Socialist Federal Republic of Yugoslavia) Slobodan Živojinović	3	6	3
2	(United States) Ken Flach (United States) Robert Seguso	6	3	6

Final
3	(Sweden) Anders Järryd (Sweden) Mats Wilander	4	6	6
2	(United States) Ken Flach (United States) Robert Seguso	6	3	2

=== Top half ===
First round
1	(Czechoslovakia) P Složil (Czechoslovakia) T Šmid	6	6
(United States) D Gitlin (United Kingdom) J Lloyd	4	2
(United States) M Dickson (United States) M Leach	4	4
(United States) S Meister (United States) B Willenborg	6	6
(Germany) P Elter (New Zealand) K Evernden	4	7	3
(Italy) P Canè (Italy) S Colombo	6	6	6
(Sweden) J Gunnarsson (Denmark) M Mortensen	6	7
6	(Paraguay) F González (South Africa) C van Rensburg	4	6
3	(Sweden) A Järryd (Sweden) M Wilander	6	6
(Australia) D Cahill (Australia) J Frawley	4	2
(Spain) S Casal (Spain) E Sánchez	7	6
WC	(Italy) M Cierro (Italy) A de Minicis	6	2
(South Africa) E Edwards (United States) B Nealon	1	5
(United States) J Arias (United States) E Korita	6	7
(United States) C Strode (United States) C Wittus	4	5
7	(Chile) H Gildemeister (Ecuador) A Gómez	6	7

Second round
1	(Czechoslovakia) P Složil (Czechoslovakia) T Šmid	1	6
(United States) S Meister (United States) B Willenborg	6	7
(Italy) P Canè (Italy) S Colombo	6	6	7
(Sweden) J Gunnarsson (Denmark) M Mortensen	2	7	6
3	(Sweden) A Järryd (Sweden) M Wilander	6	6
(Spain) S Casal (Spain) E Sánchez	3	1
(United States) J Arias (United States) E Korita	3	6	6
7	(Chile) H Gildemeister (Ecuador) A Gómez	6	3	3

Quarterfinals
(United States) S Meister (United States) B Willenborg	6	0	2
(Italy) P Canè (Italy) S Colombo	4	6	6
3	(Sweden) A Järryd (Sweden) M Wilander	7	7
(United States) J Arias (United States) E Korita	6	6

Semifinals
(Italy) P Canè (Italy) S Colombo	4	3
3	(Sweden) A Järryd (Sweden) M Wilander	6	6

=== Bottom half ===
First round
5	(Australia) M Edmondson (Australia) K Warwick	6	4	6
(Brazil) C Motta (Chile) B Prajoux	4	6	4
(Australia) D Graham (Australia) L Warder	7	3	4
(Sweden) H Simonsson (Sweden) S Simonsson	6	6	6
(Sweden) R Båthman (South Africa) M Robertson	3	3
(Czechoslovakia) L Pimek (Socialist Federal Republic of Yugoslavia) S Živojinović	6	6
WC	(Italy) A Padovani (Italy) C Pistolesi	3	4
4	(Australia) W Masur (Australia) P McNamee	6	6
8	(Germany) B Becker (France) Y Noah	6	6
(United Kingdom) C Dowdeswell (Brazil) J Soares	3	3
(Argentina) M Jaite (Paraguay) V Pecci	6	3	2
(Italy) G Ocleppo (Italy) C Panatta	2	6	6
(United States) J Gurfein (West Germany) S Hermann	6	4	6
(Italy) F Cancellotti (Italy) M Fioroni	0	6	4
(Germany) W Popp (Romania) F Segărceanu	0	7	6
2	(United States) K Flach (United States) R Seguso	6	5	7

Second round
5	(Australia) M Edmondson (Australia) K Warwick	6	6
(Sweden) H Simonsson (Sweden) S Simonsson	3	3
(Czechoslovakia) L Pimek (Socialist Federal Republic of Yugoslavia) S Živojinović	6	1	6
4	(Australia) W Masur (Australia) P McNamee	4	6	2
8	(Germany) B Becker (France) Y Noah	6	6
(Italy) G Ocleppo (Italy) C Panatta	2	3
(United States) J Gurfein (West Germany) S Hermann
2	(United States) K Flach (United States) R Seguso	w/o

Quarterfinals
5	(Australia) M Edmondson (Australia) K Warwick	1	7	2
(Czechoslovakia) L Pimek (Socialist Federal Republic of Yugoslavia) S Živojinović	6	6	6
8	(Germany) B Becker (France) Y Noah
2	(United States) K Flach (United States) R Seguso	w/o

Semifinals
(Czechoslovakia) L Pimek (Socialist Federal Republic of Yugoslavia) S Živojinović	3	6	3
2	(United States) K Flach (United States) R Seguso	6	3	6
