= 2023 Upper Austria Ladies Linz – Singles =

Singles
- 2023 Upper Austria Ladies Linz

Final
- Champion: Anastasia Potapova
- Runner-up: (Croatia) Petra Martić
- Score: 6–3, 6–1

Details
- Draw: 32
- Seeds: 8

Events
Singles	Doubles
← 2021 ·	Linz Open	· 2024 →

Anastasia Potapova defeated Petra Martić in the final, 6–3, 6–1 to win the singles tennis title at the 2023 Linz Open.

Alison Riske-Amritraj was the reigning champion, from when the event was last held in 2021, but chose not to compete this year.

== Seeds ==
1. (Greece) Maria Sakkari (semifinals)
2. Ekaterina Alexandrova (first round)
3. (Romania) Irina-Camelia Begu (first round)
4. (Ukraine) Anhelina Kalinina (second round)
5. (Croatia) Donna Vekić (quarterfinals)
6. (Croatia) Petra Martić (final)
7. (United States) Bernarda Pera (first round)
8. Anastasia Potapova (champion)

== Draw ==
Key

- Q = Qualifier
- WC = Wild card
- LL = Lucky loser
- Alt = Alternate
- ITF = ITF entry
- PR = Protected ranking
- SR = Special ranking
- SE = Special exempt
- JE = Junior exempt
- JR = Junior Accelerator Programme entrant
- CO = College Accelerator Programme entrant
- NG = Next Gen Accelerator Program entrant
- w/o = Walkover
- r = Retired
- d = Defaulted

=== Finals ===
Semifinals
1	(Greece) Maria Sakkari	6	3	4
6	(Croatia) Petra Martić	3	6	6
8	Anastasia Potapova	6	6^{4}	6
(Czech Republic) Markéta Vondroušová	1	7^{7}	3

Final
6	(Croatia) Petra Martić	3	1
8	Anastasia Potapova	6	6

=== Top half ===
First round
1	(Greece) M Sakkari	6	7^{8}
(Spain) N Párrizas Díaz	1	6^{6}
LL	V Gracheva	7	7
A Blinkova	5	5
(United States) M Brengle	7^{7}	6
WC	(Austria) J Grabher	6^{2}	2
(Germany) T Korpatsch	6^{4}	1
5	(Croatia) D Vekić	7^{7}	6
3	(Romania) I-C Begu	1	2
LL	(Denmark) C Tauson	6	6
(Italy) C Giorgi	6	6
PR	(Romania) J Cristian	1	2
(Czech Republic) L Nosková	6^{3}	2
(Belgium) A Van Uytvanck	7^{7}	6
Q	(Spain) M Bassols Ribera	1	5
6	(Croatia) P Martić	6	7

Second round
1	(Greece) M Sakkari	6	6
LL	V Gracheva	4	2
(United States) M Brengle	3	1
5	(Croatia) D Vekić	6	6
LL	(Denmark) C Tauson	1	6	6
(Italy) C Giorgi	6	3	4
(Belgium) A Van Uytvanck	4	7^{7}	6^{3}
6	(Croatia) P Martić	6	6^{5}	7^{7}

Quarterfinals
1	(Greece) M Sakkari	6	7^{10}
5	(Croatia) D Vekić	3	6^{8}
LL	(Denmark) C Tauson	4	5
6	(Croatia) P Martić	6	7

Semifinals
1	(Greece) M Sakkari	6	3	4
6	(Croatia) P Martić	3	6	6

=== Bottom half ===
First round
8	A Potapova	2	6	6
(Italy) L Bronzetti	6	3	4
(Germany) J Niemeier	2	6	6
WC	(United States) S Kenin	6	3	4
Q	(Germany) A-L Friedsam	6	6
Q	(Italy) S Errani	2	4
(United States) A Parks	2	5
4	(Ukraine) A Kalinina	6	7
7	(United States) B Pera	2	6^{5}
Q	(Hungary) D Gálfi	6	7^{7}
LL	K Rakhimova	4	6^{5}
WC	(Germany) E Lys	6	7^{7}
(Czech Republic) M Vondroušová	6	6
Q	(Bulgaria) V Tomova	3	3
Q	(Spain) R Masarova	4	6	7^{8}
2	E Alexandrova	6	1	6^{6}

Second round
8	A Potapova	7	3	6
(Germany) J Niemeier	5	6	3
Q	(Germany) A-L Friedsam	6	7
4	(Ukraine) A Kalinina	3	5
Q	(Hungary) D Gálfi	6	3	6
WC	(Germany) E Lys	4	6	3
(Czech Republic) M Vondroušová	6	6
Q	(Spain) R Masarova	1	1

Quarterfinals
8	A Potapova	2	6	6
Q	(Germany) A-L Friedsam	6	4	1
Q	(Hungary) D Gálfi	1^{r}
(Czech Republic) M Vondroušová	4

Semifinals
8	A Potapova	6	6^{4}	6
(Czech Republic) M Vondroušová	1	7^{7}	3

== Qualifying ==
=== Seeds ===
1. Varvara Gracheva (qualifying competition, lucky loser)
2. (Ukraine) Kateryna Baindl (first round)
3. (Czech Republic) Markéta Vondroušová (moved to main draw)
4. (Hungary) Dalma Gálfi (qualified)
5. (Bulgaria) Viktoriya Tomova (qualified)
6. (Spain) Rebeka Masarova (qualified)
7. (Italy) Sara Errani (qualified)
8. Kamilla Rakhimova (qualifying competition, lucky loser)
9. (Germany) Anna-Lena Friedsam (qualified)
10. (Slovakia) Viktória Kužmová (first round)
11. (Spain) Marina Bassols Ribera (qualified)
12. (Denmark) Clara Tauson (qualifying competition, lucky loser)

=== Qualifiers ===
1. (Germany) Anna-Lena Friedsam
2. (Spain) Marina Bassols Ribera
3. (Italy) Sara Errani
4. (Hungary) Dalma Gálfi
5. (Bulgaria) Viktoriya Tomova
6. (Spain) Rebeka Masarova

=== Lucky losers ===
1. Varvara Gracheva
2. Kamilla Rakhimova
3. (Denmark) Clara Tauson

=== Qualifying draw ===
==== First qualifier ====
First round
1	Varvara Gracheva	6	6
(Austria) Sinja Kraus	2	4
(Brazil) Ingrid Gamarra Martins	1	2
9	(Germany) Anna-Lena Friedsam	6	6

Qualifying competition
1	Varvara Gracheva	6	3	1
9	(Germany) Anna-Lena Friedsam	2	6	6

==== Second qualifier ====
First round
2	(Ukraine) Kateryna Baindl	1	4
(Germany) Noma Noha Akugue	6	6
(Czech Republic) Miriam Kolodziejová	1	4
11	(Spain) Marina Bassols Ribera	6	6

Qualifying competition
(Germany) Noma Noha Akugue	4	6	3
11	(Spain) Marina Bassols Ribera	6	3	6

==== Third qualifier ====
First round
Alt	(Austria) Johanna Hiesmair	3	2
(Venezuela) Andrea Gámiz	6	6
(Czech Republic) Denisa Hindová	7^{7}	1	1
7	(Italy) Sara Errani	6^{4}	6	6

Qualifying competition
(Venezuela) Andrea Gámiz	2	3
7	(Italy) Sara Errani	6	6

==== Fourth qualifier ====
First round
4	(Hungary) Dalma Gálfi	7^{7}	6
WC	(Austria) Melanie Klaffner	6^{5}	4
WC	(Austria) Veronika Bokor	4	0
8	Kamilla Rakhimova	6	6

Qualifying competition
4	(Hungary) Dalma Gálfi	6	4	7
8	Kamilla Rakhimova	4	6	5

==== Fifth qualifier ====
First round
5	(Bulgaria) Viktoriya Tomova	6	6
(Austria) Barbara Haas	2	1
WC	Anastasia Pavlyuchenkova	6	6
10	(Slovakia) Viktória Kužmová	3	4

Qualifying competition
5	(Bulgaria) Viktoriya Tomova	6	4	6
WC	Anastasia Pavlyuchenkova	3	6	3

==== Sixth qualifier ====
First round
6	(Spain) Rebeka Masarova	6	6
PR	(Spain) Georgina García Pérez	0	3
WC	(Austria) Alina Michalitsch	0	2
12	(Denmark) Clara Tauson	6	6

Qualifying competition
6	(Spain) Rebeka Masarova	6	6
12	(Denmark) Clara Tauson	4	2
