= 2023 Upper Austria Ladies Linz =

- Date: 6–12 February
- Edition: 32nd
- Category: WTA 250
- Draw: 32S / 16D
- Prize money: $259,303
- Surface: Hard (Indoor) - (DecoTurf on Wood)
- Location: Linz, Austria
- Venue: Design Center Linz

Champions

Singles
- Anastasia Potapova

Doubles
- (Georgia (country)) Natela Dzalamidze / (Slovakia) Viktória Kužmová
- Linz Open

The 2023 Upper Austria Ladies Linz was a professional women's tennis tournament played on indoor hard courts. It was the 32nd edition of the tournament, and part of the WTA 250 series of the 2023 WTA Tour. It was held at the Design Center Linz in Linz, Austria, from 6 to 12 February 2023. Due to scheduling issues, the October 2022 edition was delayed to February 2023 in order to attract top WTA players to compete in the tournament. Eighth-seeded Anastasia Potapova won the singles title.

== Finals ==
=== Singles ===
- Anastasia Potapova defeated (Croatia) Petra Martić, 6–3, 6–1

=== Doubles ===
- (Georgia (country)) Natela Dzalamidze / (Slovakia) Viktória Kužmová defeated (Germany) Anna-Lena Friedsam / (Ukraine) Nadiia Kichenok 4–6, 7–5, [12–10]

== Points and prize money ==
=== Point distribution ===
Event	W	F	SF	QF	Round of 16	Round of 32	Q	Q2	Q1
Singles	280	180	110	60	30	1	18	12	1
Doubles	280	180	110	60	1	—N/a	—N/a	—N/a	—N/a

=== Prize money ===
Event	W	F	SF	QF	Round of 16	Round of 32^{1}	Q2	Q1
Singles	$43,000	$21,400	$11,500	$6,175	$3,400	$2,100	$1,020	$600
Doubles *	$12,300	$6,400	$3,435	$1,820	$960	—N/a	—N/a	—N/a

_{^{1} Qualifiers prize money is also the Round of 32 prize money}
_{* per team}

== Singles entrants ==
=== Seeds ===
Country	Player	Rank^{1}	Seed
GRE	Maria Sakkari	7	1
	Ekaterina Alexandrova	17	2
ROU	Irina-Camelia Begu	27	3
UKR	Anhelina Kalinina	31	4
CRO	Donna Vekić	33	5
CRO	Petra Martić	36	6
USA	Bernarda Pera	41	7
	Anastasia Potapova	43	8

- Rankings as of January 30, 2023

=== Other entrants ===
The following players received wildcards into the singles main draw:

- (Austria) Julia Grabher
- (United States) Sofia Kenin
- (Germany) Eva Lys

The following players received entry using a protected ranking:

- (Romania) Jaqueline Cristian
- (Romania) ~~Patricia Maria Țig~~

The following players received entry from the qualifying draw:

- (Spain) Marina Bassols Ribera
- (Italy) Sara Errani
- (Germany) Anna-Lena Friedsam
- (Hungary) Dalma Gálfi
- (Spain) Rebeka Masarova
- (Bulgaria) Viktoriya Tomova

The following players received entry as lucky losers:

- Varvara Gracheva
- Kamilla Rakhimova
- (Denmark) Clara Tauson

=== Withdrawals ===
Before the tournament

- (Italy) Elisabetta Cocciaretto → replaced by (Germany) Tamara Korpatsch
- (Montenegro) Danka Kovinić → replaced by Kamilla Rakhimova
- (Italy) Jasmine Paolini → replaced by (United States) Alycia Parks
- (Czech Republic) Kateřina Siniaková → replaced by (Denmark) Clara Tauson
- (Romania) Patricia Maria Țig → replaced by Varvara Gracheva

=== Retirements ===
- (Hungary) Dalma Gálfi (right thigh injury)

== Doubles entrants ==
=== Seeds ===
Country	Player	Country	Player	Rank^{1}	Seed
	Alexandra Panova	USA	Alycia Parks	117	1
CZE	Anastasia Dețiuc	CZE	Miriam Kolodziejová	135	2
	Kamilla Rakhimova		Yana Sizikova	142	3
USA	Kaitlyn Christian	USA	Sabrina Santamaria	143	3

- ^{1} Rankings as of January 30, 2023

=== Other entrants ===
The following pairs received wildcards into the doubles main draw:

- (Austria) Veronika Bokor / (Austria) Alina Michalitsch
- (Austria) Melanie Klaffner / (Austria) Sinja Kraus

The following pair received entry using a protected ranking:

- (Venezuela) Andrea Gámiz / (Spain) Georgina García Pérez

=== Withdrawals ===
- (Australia) Monique Adamczak / (Netherlands) Rosalie van der Hoek → replaced by (Czech Republic) Jesika Malečková / (Netherlands) Rosalie van der Hoek
- (United Kingdom) Alicia Barnett / (United Kingdom) Olivia Nicholls → replaced by (Venezuela) Andrea Gámiz / (Spain) Georgina García Pérez
- (Hungary) Anna Bondár / (Belgium) Kimberley Zimmermann → replaced by (Netherlands) Bibiane Schoofs / (Belgium) Kimberley Zimmermann
- (Ukraine) Nadiia Kichenok / (Japan) Makoto Ninomiya → replaced by (Germany) Anna-Lena Friedsam / (Ukraine) Nadiia Kichenok
