= 1990 Torneo Internazionale =

- Date: 9–13 July
- Edition: 3rd
- Category: Tier V
- Draw: 32S / 16D
- Prize money: $75,000
- Surface: Clay / outdoor
- Location: Palermo, Italy
- Venue: Country Time Club

Champions

Singles
- (Germany) Isabel Cueto

Doubles
- (Italy) Laura Garrone / (Luxembourg) Karin Kschwendt
Torneo Internazionale	· 1991 →

The 1990 Torneo Internazionale was a women's tennis tournament played on outdoor clay courts at the Country Time Club in Palermo, Italy that was part of the Tier V category of the 1990 WTA Tour. It was the third edition of the tournament and was held from 9 July until 13 July 1990. Second-seeded Isabel Cueto won the singles title.

== Finals ==
=== Singles ===
(Germany) Isabel Cueto defeated (Austria) Barbara Paulus 6–2, 6–3

- It was Cueto's 1st singles title of the year and the 5th and last of her career.

=== Doubles ===
(Italy) Laura Garrone / (Luxembourg) Karin Kschwendt defeated (Argentina) Florencia Labat / (Italy) Barbara Romanò 6–2, 6–4
