= 1985 Italian Open – Men's singles =

Men's singles
- 1985 Italian Open

Final
- Champion: (France) Yannick Noah
- Runner-up: (Czechoslovakia) Miloslav Mečíř
- Score: 6–4, 3–6, 6–2, 7–6

Details
- Draw: 64 (5WC/8Q)
- Seeds: 16

Events
Singles	men	women
Doubles	men	women
- Italian Open

Andrés Gómez was the defending champion, but lost in the first round to Jan Gunnarsson.

Yannick Noah won the title by defeating Miloslav Mečíř 6–4, 3–6, 6–2, 7–6 in the final.

== Seeds ==
1. (Sweden) Mats Wilander (semifinals)
2. (Ecuador) Andrés Gómez (first round)
3. (Sweden) Anders Järryd (third round)
4. (United States) Aaron Krickstein (first round)
5. (Sweden) Henrik Sundström (quarterfinals)
6. (Czechoslovakia) Tomáš Šmíd (third round)
7. (Czechoslovakia) Miloslav Mečíř (final)
8. (United States) Vitas Gerulaitis (first round)
9. (France) Yannick Noah (champion)
10. (Czechoslovakia) Libor Pimek (second round)
11. (United States) Jimmy Arias (third round)
12. (Italy) Francesco Cancellotti (third round)
13. (Argentina) José Luis Clerc (quarterfinals)
14. (United States) Greg Holmes (first round)
15. (Spain) Juan Aguilera (third round)
16. (Argentina) Guillermo Vilas (third round)

Click on the seed number of a player to go to their draw section.

== Draw ==
Key

- Q = Qualifier
- WC = Wild card
- LL = Lucky loser
- Alt = Alternate
- ITF = ITF entry
- PR = Protected ranking
- SR = Special ranking
- SE = Special exempt
- JE = Junior exempt
- JR = Junior Accelerator Programme entrant
- CO = College Accelerator Programme entrant
- NG = Next Gen Accelerator Program entrant
- w/o = Walkover
- r = Retired
- d = Defaulted

=== Finals ===
Quarterfinals
1	(Sweden) Mats Wilander	7	6
5	(Sweden) Henrik Sundström	5	2
WC	(Switzerland) Claudio Mezzadri	1	2
7	(Czechoslovakia) Miloslav Mečíř	6	6
13	(Argentina) José Luis Clerc	1	5
9	(France) Yannick Noah	6	7
(Germany) Boris Becker	6	6
(Sweden) Jan Gunnarsson	4	4

Semifinals
1	(Sweden) Mats Wilander	2	4
7	(Czechoslovakia) Miloslav Mečíř	6	6
9	(France) Yannick Noah	6	6
(Germany) Boris Becker	3	3

Final
7	(Czechoslovakia) Miloslav Mečíř	3	6	2	6
9	(France) Yannick Noah	6	3	6	7

=== Top half ===
==== Section 1 ====
First round
1	(Sweden) M Wilander	7	6
(Brazil) C Motta	6	2
(Czechoslovakia) P Složil	6	6
Q	(Italy) E Mazza	2	2
(Spain) E Sánchez	4	6	6
(Chile) H Gildemeister	6	3	0
(Germany) M Westphal	7	6
14	(United States) G Holmes	6	4
12	(Italy) F Cancellotti	6	6
(Australia) W Masur	3	0
(Argentina) M Jaite	3	2
(United States) M Dickson	6	6
(Germany) P Elter	3	3
(Sweden) S Simonsson	6	6
WC	(Italy) C Pistolesi	6	1
5	(Sweden) H Sundström	7	6

Second round
1	(Sweden) M Wilander	4
(Czechoslovakia) P Složil	1^{r}
(Spain) E Sánchez	6	6
(Germany) M Westphal	4	0
12	(Italy) F Cancellotti	6	6
(United States) M Dickson	4	0
(Sweden) S Simonsson	6	3	3
5	(Sweden) H Sundström	2	6	6

Third round
1	(Sweden) M Wilander	6	2	6
(Spain) E Sánchez	2	6	3
12	(Italy) F Cancellotti	3	1
5	(Sweden) H Sundström	6	6

Quarterfinals
1	(Sweden) M Wilander	7	6
5	(Sweden) H Sundström	5	2

==== Section 2 ====
First round
4	(United States) A Krickstein	4	6
(Australia) P McNamee	6	7
WC	(Switzerland) C Mezzadri	6	4	7
(Argentina) H de la Peña	3	6	6
Q	(Italy) M Cierro	6	4	6
(West Germany) H Schwaier	1	6	3
(Argentina) R Argüello	5	4
16	(Argentina) G Vilas	7	6
10	(Czechoslovakia) L Pimek	7	6
(Brazil) J Soares	5	3
Q	(South Africa) M Robertson	3	6
Q	(Sweden) K Carlsson	6	7
(United States) B Willenborg	6	7
(Netherlands) M Schapers	1	6
Q	(Italy) M Narducci	6	1
7	(Czechoslovakia) M Mečíř	7	6

Second round
(Australia) P McNamee	4	6	6
WC	(Switzerland) C Mezzadri	6	1	7
Q	(Italy) M Cierro	0	6	3
16	(Argentina) G Vilas	6	3	6
10	(Czechoslovakia) L Pimek	3	2
Q	(Sweden) K Carlsson	6	6
(United States) B Willenborg	3	7	1
7	(Czechoslovakia) M Mečíř	6	6	6

Third round
WC	(Switzerland) C Mezzadri	6	6
16	(Argentina) G Vilas	3	2
Q	(Sweden) K Carlsson	6	4
7	(Czechoslovakia) M Mečíř	7	6

Quarterfinals
WC	(Switzerland) C Mezzadri	1	2
7	(Czechoslovakia) M Mečíř	6	6

=== Bottom half ===
==== Section 3 ====
First round
6	(Czechoslovakia) T Šmid	2	6	6
(United States) S Meister	6	3	2
(United States) J Brown	4	6	6
(France) T Allan	6	4	2
Q	(Spain) J Arrese	4	1
WC	(Italy) C Panatta	6	6
WC	(Italy) S Colombo	6	3
13	(Argentina) J Luis Clerc	7	6
9	(France) Y Noah	6	6
Q	(Romania) F Segărceanu	3	2
(Germany) W Popp	2	6	4
Q	(Germany) R Osterthun	6	2	6
(Uruguay) D Pérez	2	4
(United States) M Leach	6	6
(Paraguay) V Pecci	5	2
3	(Sweden) A Järryd	7	6

Second round
6	(Czechoslovakia) T Šmid	6	2	6
(United States) J Brown	3	6	4
WC	(Italy) C Panatta	4	6	6
13	(Argentina) J Luis Clerc	6	1	7
9	(France) Y Noah	6	7
Q	(Germany) R Osterthun	4	5
(United States) M Leach	3	6	1
3	(Sweden) A Järryd	6	1	6

Third round
6	(Czechoslovakia) T Šmid	4	2
13	(Argentina) J Luis Clerc	6	6
9	(France) Y Noah	6	7
3	(Sweden) A Järryd	1	5

Quarterfinals
13	(Argentina) J Luis Clerc	1	5
9	(France) Y Noah	6	7

==== Section 4 ====
First round
8	(United States) V Gerulaitis	3	2
(France) T Tulasne	6	6
(France) T Benhabiles	3	3
(Germany) B Becker	6	6
(Peru) P Arraya	4	1
(United Kingdom) J Lloyd	6	6
(Italy) G Ocleppo	1	2
15	(Spain) J Aguilera	6	6
11	(United States) J Arias	6	6
(Australia) J Frawley	3	2
(Spain) F Luna	0	6	3
(Socialist Federal Republic of Yugoslavia) S Živojinović	6	2	6
(Argentina) A Ganzábal	6	6
WC	(Italy) P Canè	4	2
(Sweden) J Gunnarsson	6	1	6
2	(Ecuador) A Gómez	2	6	3

Second round
(France) T Tulasne	3	1
(Germany) B Becker	6	6
(United Kingdom) J Lloyd	3	2
15	(Spain) J Aguilera	6	6
11	(United States) J Arias	6	6
(Socialist Federal Republic of Yugoslavia) S Živojinović	4	3
(Argentina) A Ganzábal	4	5
(Sweden) J Gunnarsson	6	7

Third round
(Germany) B Becker	7	6
15	(Spain) J Aguilera	6	3
11	(United States) J Arias	6	4	3
(Sweden) J Gunnarsson	4	6	6

Quarterfinals
(Germany) B Becker	6	6
(Sweden) J Gunnarsson	4	4
