= Jasmine Paolini =

Italian tennis player (born 1996)

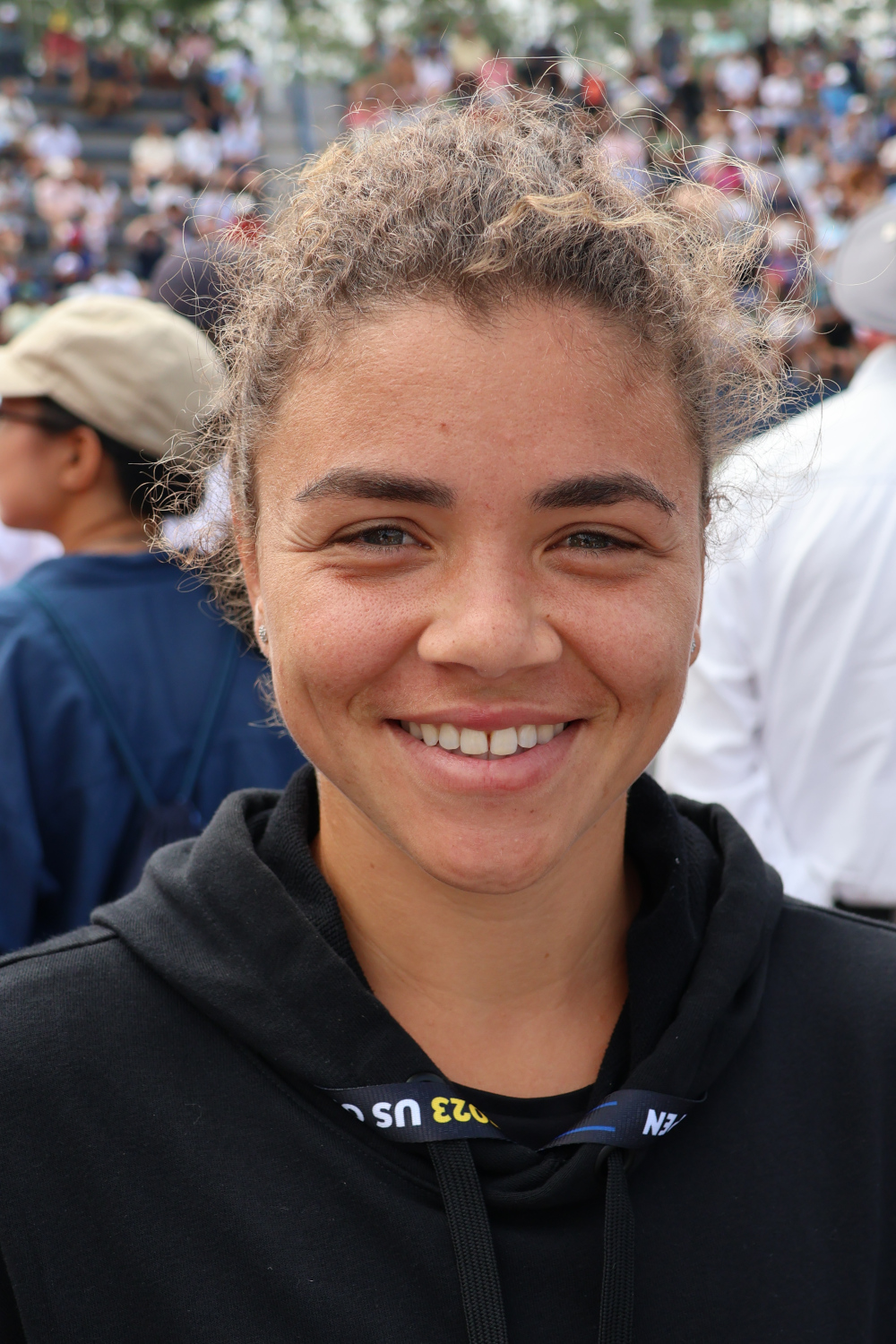
- Paolini at the 2023 US Open
- Residence: Bagni di Lucca, Italy
- Born: 4 January 1996 (age 30) Castelnuovo di Garfagnana, Italy
- Height: 1.63 m (5 ft 4 in)
- Turned pro: 2015
- Plays: Right-handed (two-handed backhand)
- Coach: Danilo Pizzorno, Sara Errani (Dec 2025–); Federico Gaio (Jul–Nov 2025)
- Prize money: US $16,950,819

Singles
- Career record: 452–308
- Career titles: 3
- Highest ranking: No. 4 (28 October 2024)
- Current ranking: No. 35 (16 November 2026)

Grand Slam singles results
- Australian Open: 4R (2024)
- French Open: F (2024)
- Wimbledon: F (2024)
- US Open: 4R (2024)

Other tournaments
- Tour Finals: RR (2024, 2025)
- Olympic Games: 3R (2024)

Doubles
- Career record: 133–93
- Career titles: 11
- Highest ranking: No. 3 (27 October 2025)
- Current ranking: No. 16 (16 November 2026)

Grand Slam doubles results
- Australian Open: 3R (2021, 2024)
- French Open: W (2025)
- Wimbledon: 3R (2024)
- US Open: SF (2025)

Other doubles tournaments
- Tour Finals: F (2026)
- Olympic Games: W (2024)

Team competitions
- BJK Cup: W (2024, 2025)
Medal record
Representing Italy
Olympic Games
Gold medal – first place	2024 Paris	Doubles
- Last updated on: 26 October 2026.

Jasmine Paolini (Note: Italian: [ˈdʒazmim paoˈliːni]; in isolation, Jasmine is pronounced [ˈdʒazmin].) (born 4 January 1996) is an Italian professional tennis player. She has been ranked world No. 4

in singles by the WTA, the joint-highest-ranked Italian woman in singles (alongside Francesca Schiavone), and No. 3 in doubles. Paolini is a Grand Slam champion in doubles at the 2025 French Open, partnering Sara Errani. Representing her country, Paolini won an Olympic gold medal in doubles at the 2024 Paris Olympics, also with Errani. On the WTA Tour, she has won three singles titles and ten in doubles, including two singles and five doubles WTA 1000 titles. She is also a three-time major finalist, contesting the singles and doubles finals of the 2024 French Open and the singles final of the 2024 Wimbledon Championships. Paolini led Italy to the 2024 and 2025 Billie Jean King Cup titles, winning the Heart Award for the 2024.

== Early life ==
Jasmine Paolini was born in Castelnuovo di Garfagnana. Her father, Ugo, is Italian and her mother, Jacqueline, is of Ghanaian and Polish descent, originally from Łódź. In 2001, at the age of five, Paolini was introduced to tennis by her father and uncle, and trained at the Mirafiume Tennis Club in Bagni di Lucca in her youth. In 2011, at the age of 15, Paolini moved to Tirrenia for training. Her younger brother, William, also plays tennis.

== Career ==
=== Juniors ===
In January 2013, Paolini won her only junior title at the J4 Wilson ITF Junior Classic in Bergheim. She made her Junior Grand Slam debut after qualifying for the US Open later that year. She reached the third round in singles, before losing to eventual finalist Tornado Alicia Black. She also reached the third round of the Australian Open in January 2014.

=== 2015–17: WTA Tour debut, first 100k title ===
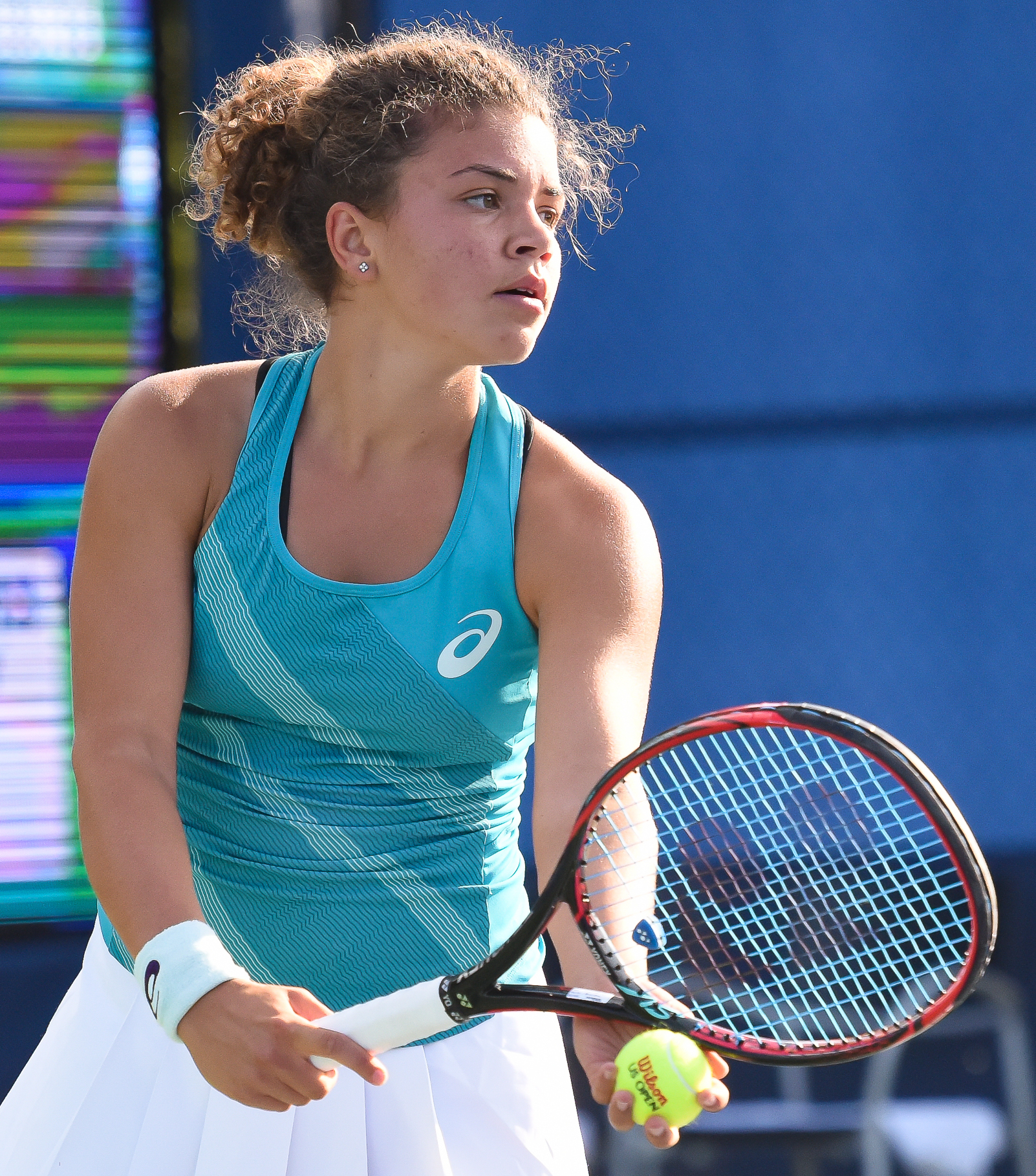
Paolini at the 2017 US Open

In May 2015, Paolini received a wildcard into the main draw of the doubles tournament at the Italian Open with Nastassja Burnett. The pair lost in the first round to Alla Kudryavtseva and Anastasia Pavlyuchenkova. In June 2017, Paolini won her first 100k title at Marseille where she defeated Taylor Townsend, Sara Cakarevic, Anhelina Kalinina, Dalma Gálfi, and top seed Tatjana Maria. She made her WTA Tour singles debut in the following month at the Swedish Open but lost in the first round to fifth seed Carla Suárez Navarro. She also entered the Guangzhou International Open and lost in the first round to third seed Anett Kontaveit.

=== 2018–20: WTA Tour wins, top 100 ===
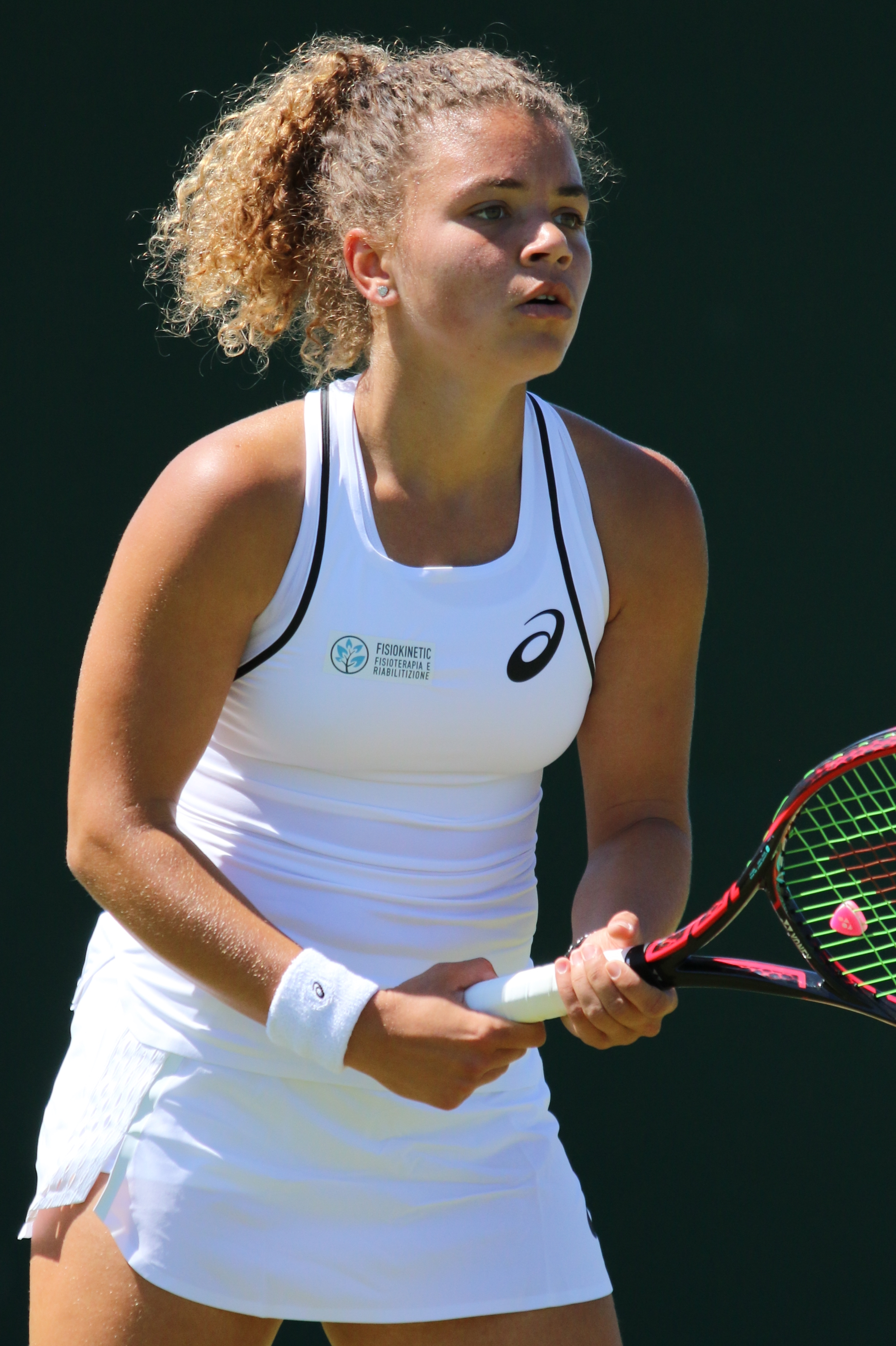
Paolini in the qualifiers of the 2018 Wimbledon Championships

After failing to qualify for the 2018 Australian Open, Paolini represented Italy in the Fed Cup against Spain in the World Group II and against Belgium in the World Group play-offs. In April 2018, she recorded her first WTA Tour win at the Copa Colsanitas against qualifier Lizette Cabrera. The following month, as a lucky loser at the Prague Open, she upset third seed Daria Kasatkina and defeated Anna Karolína Schmiedlová to reach her first WTA quarterfinal.

In May 2019, Paolini made her WTA 1000 singles debut as a wildcard entrant at the Italian Open, but lost in the first round to Sofia Kenin. Later that month, she qualified for her first Grand Slam tournament at the French Open by defeating Anna Zaja, Rebecca Šramková, and Allie Kiick in the qualifiers without dropping a set. She then reached the quarterfinals of the Palermo Ladies Open, defeating Laura Siegemund and Irina-Camelia Begu before losing to top seed Kiki Bertens. She also qualified for the main draw in Guangzhou and reached the quarterfinals. After reaching the final of the Tokyo Open in November 2019, Paolini reached a new career-high of world No. 96. She was the first Italian to reach the top 100 since Camila Giorgi in 2012.

In 2020, the Italian entered directly into the main draws of the Australian Open and the US Open, but failed to advance past the first round of either. She recorded her first WTA 1000 level win at the Italian Open by defeating Anastasija Sevastova in the first round. At the French Open, which was postponed to September due to the COVID-19 pandemic, Paolini recorded her first major win by defeating Aliona Bolsova in the first round. She also recorded her first doubles win at a major, partnering Varvara Gracheva and defeating Lyudmyla and Nadiia Kichenok in the first round.

=== 2021: Tour singles and doubles titles ===
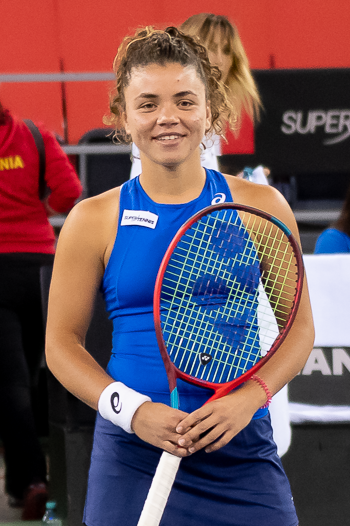
Paolini at the 2020 - 2021 Billie Jean King Cup play-offs

At the Gippsland Trophy in February 2021, Paolini reached her first WTA 500 third round, defeating Rebecca Marino and tenth seed Wang Qiang, before losing to eighth seed Karolína Muchová. She reached her first WTA 125 final at Saint-Malo by defeating Elsa Jacquemot, Nina Stojanović, Anna Karolína Schmiedlová, and Varvara Gracheva, before ultimately losing to Viktorija Golubic. She reached her second consecutive second round at the French Open with a win over Stefanie Vögele.

In June, the Italian won her first WTA 125 title seeded third at the Bol Open, defeating Viktória Hrunčáková, Olga Govortsova, Kristína Kučová, top seed Anna Blinkova, and second seed Arantxa Rus. The following month, she won her first WTA Tour doubles title at the Hamburg European Open, partnering Jil Teichmann. At the Summer Olympics, Paolini represented Italy in both singles and doubles. In singles, she lost in the first round to tenth seed Petra Kvitová. In doubles, she and partner Sara Errani, who had entered as alternates, reached the second round by upsetting the eighth-seeded team of Nicole Melichar and Alison Riske.

In September, Paolini won her first career title at the Slovenia Open in Portorož, defeating sixth seed Dayana Yastremska, Anna Kalinskaya, fourth seed Sorana Cîrstea, second seed Yulia Putintseva, and third seed Alison Riske. The following month, she reached her first WTA 1000 third round, after qualifying for the Indian Wells Open and defeating Mai Hontama and 14th seed Elise Mertens. She ended the season by reaching the semifinals of the Courmayeur Ladies Open and the quarterfinals of the Linz Open.

=== 2022: Top 50, first top-10 win ===
At the Melbourne Summer Set 1, Paolini and partner Sara Errani reached the doubles final, but lost to the second-seeded team of Asia Muhammad and Jessica Pegula. Following the Australian Open, the Italian entered the WTA top 50 for the first time. She reached back-to-back third rounds at the Indian Wells Open, upsetting second seed Aryna Sabalenka in the second round for her first top 10 win.

Paolini reached back-to-back WTA 250 quarterfinals in Palermo and Warsaw. Attempting to defend her title in Portorož, she defeated Tara Würth and Kaja Juvan, before losing to eventual champion Kateřina Siniaková in the quarterfinals. She reached her second WTA final at the Transylvania Open, defeating sixth seed Marta Kostyuk, Dayana Yastremska, Jule Niemeier, and seventh seed Wang Xiyu, before ultimately losing to qualifier Anna Blinkova. She ended her season by winning the 100k Torneig Internacional Els Gorchs.

=== 2023: Italian No. 1, BJK Cup final ===
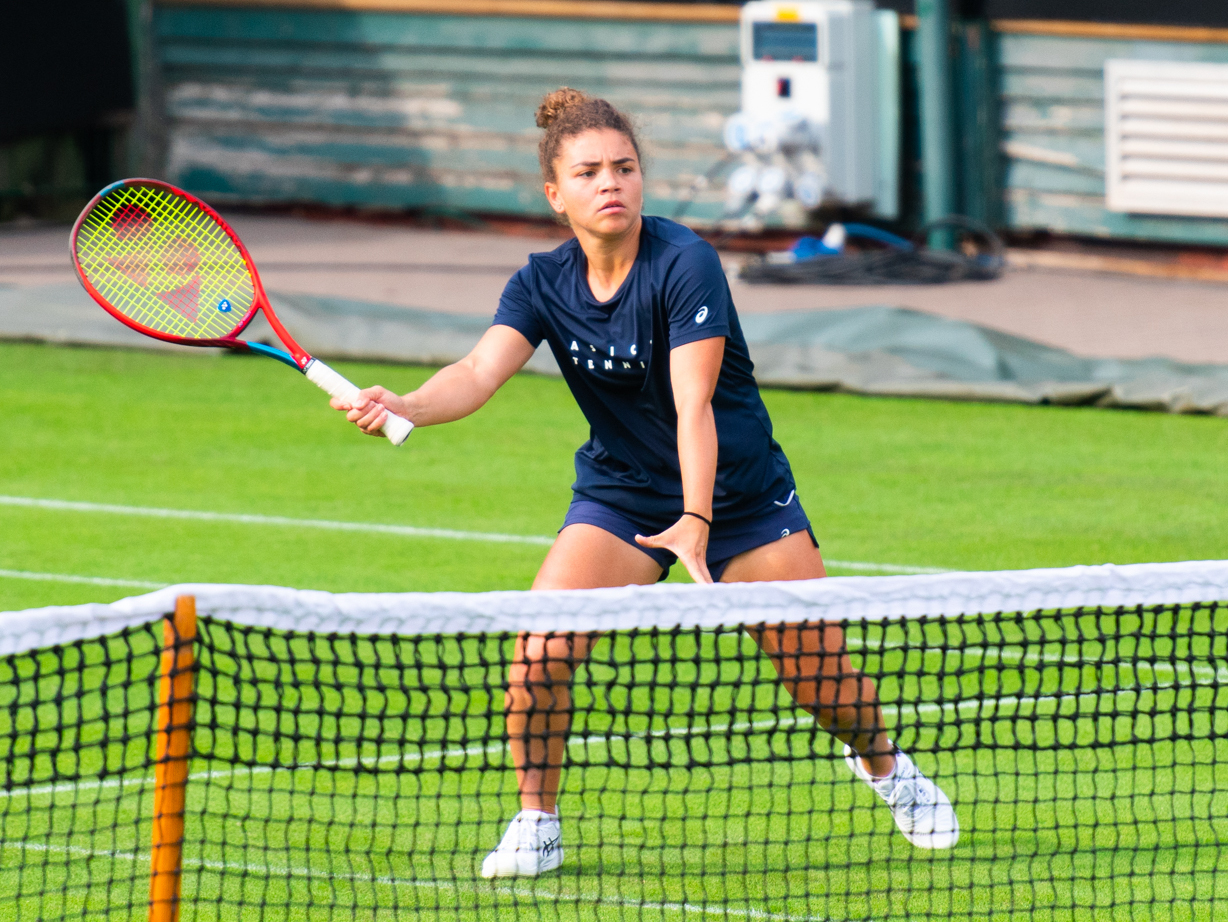
Paolini at the 2023 Birmingham Classic

Paolini's 2023 season started out slow, with first-round exits at the Australian Open, Dubai, Indian Wells, Miami, and Madrid. She won her second WTA 125 title in May, seeded fourth at the Firenze Ladies Open, and reached the final of the Makarska International Championships the following month. In July, she reached the final at the Palermo Ladies Open as the fourth seed, defeating Arantxa Rus, Dayana Yastremska, top seed Daria Kasatkina, and Sara Sorribes Tormo, before losing to second seed Zheng Qinwen. Paolini qualified for the Cincinnati Open, where she reached the quarterfinals with wins over Marta Kostyuk and Cristina Bucșa, and an early retirement by Elena Rybakina. The following month, she reached the first WTA 1000 doubles semifinal of her career, partnering Mayar Sherif, in Guadalajara.

At the China Open, Paolini reached the third round in singles with wins over Beatriz Haddad Maia and Yuan Yue. Following this result, she reached a new career-high ranking of No. 31 on 9 October and surpassed Elisabetta Cocciaretto as the No. 1 Italian female tennis player. At the Zhengzhou Open, she reached the semifinals defeating Moyuka Uchijima, world No. 10 Caroline Garcia, and Laura Siegemund, before losing to eventual champion Zheng Qinwen. The following week, she reached the final of the Jasmin Open in both singles and doubles. As the top seed in singles, she defeated Alizé Cornet, Petra Marčinko, sixth seed Lucia Bronzetti, and fourth seed Lesia Tsurenko, before losing to second seed and defending champion Elise Mertens. In doubles, she and partner Sara Errani won the title after saving a match point in the semifinals. In the Billie Jean King Cup Finals in November, Paolini and Team Italy defeated teams from France, Germany, and Slovenia, before losing to Team Canada in the final.

=== 2024: Two major finals, Olympic gold ===
At the Australian Open, Paolini reached the fourth round of a major for the first time with wins over Diana Shnaider, Tatjana Maria, and Anna Blinkova, before being beaten by fellow first-time fourth rounder Anna Kalinskaya. Despite the loss, she reached a new career-high ranking of 24. Playing with Sara Errani, she won the doubles title at the Linz Open in February, defeating top seeds Nicole Melichar-Martinez and Ellen Perez in the final.

At the Dubai Championships, Paolini reached her second quarterfinal at WTA 1000 level, defeating 11th seed Beatriz Haddad Maia, Leylah Fernandez and eighth seed Maria Sakkari. She reached her first final at this level, following a win over Sorana Cîrstea in the semifinals. In the final, she defeated qualifier Anna Kalinskaya to win her first WTA 1000 title, avenging her Australian Open loss earlier in the season. As a result, she moved into the top 15 of the rankings on 26 February 2024.

At the Indian Wells Open, Paolini reached the fourth round, defeating Tatjana Maria and 21st seed Anna Kalinskaya again, before losing to 28th seed Anastasia Potapova. She reached a new career-high ranking of No. 13 after a quarterfinal appearance at the Porsche Grand Prix in Stuttgart, where she defeated compatriot Sara Errani and seventh seed Ons Jabeur, before losing to eventual champion Elena Rybakina. Following a fourth-round run in Madrid, she rose further to a career-high of No. 12.

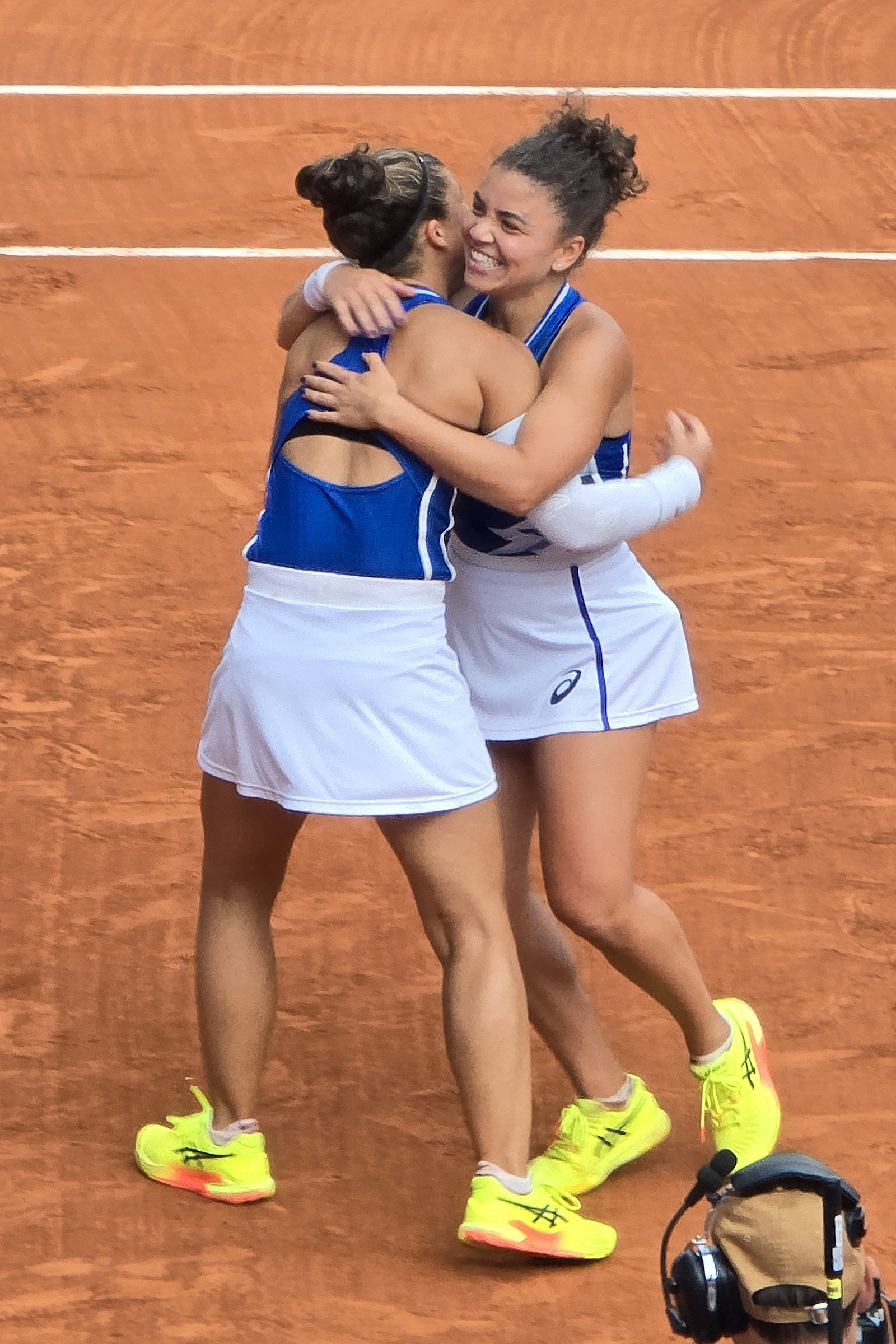
Paolini and Sara Errani following the women's doubles final at the 2024 Summer Olympics

Partnering with Sara Errani, Paolini reached the doubles final at the Italian Open and defeated the third-seeded team of Coco Gauff and Erin Routliffe to win her first WTA 1000 doubles title. As a result, she reached the top 25 in doubles on 20 May 2024. Seeded 12th at the French Open, Paolini reached a major quarterfinal for the first time with wins over Daria Saville, lucky loser Hailey Baptiste, 2019 US Open champion Bianca Andreescu, and Elina Avanesyan. She then upset fourth seed Elena Rybakina for her first top-five win at a major. In the semifinals, she defeated Mirra Andreeva to reach her first major final, which she lost to world No. 1, Iga Świątek. With Errani, she also reached the doubles final, but the pair lost to the fifth-seeded team of Coco Gauff and Kateřina Siniaková.

Having never won a match at the tournament, Paolini, seeded seventh, reached the final at Wimbledon, recording wins over Sara Sorribes Tormo, Greet Minnen, Bianca Andreescu, Madison Keys, Emma Navarro, and Donna Vekić. She became the first Italian woman to reach the Wimbledon semifinals in the Open Era, and the first woman to reach both the French Open and Wimbledon finals in the same season since Serena Williams in 2016. Paolini ultimately lost in the final to 31st seed Barbora Krejčíková in three sets. Following her run, she reached a new career-high ranking of world No. 5, on 15 July 2024.

Seeded fourth in singles at the 2024 Summer Olympics, Paolini was upset in the third round by world No. 67, Anna Karolína Schmiedlová. Seeded third in doubles, she and Errani won the gold medal, defeating Mirra Andreeva and Diana Shnaider in the final. In October, Paolini and Errani won the doubles title at the China Open, defeating Chan Hao-ching and Veronika Kudermetova in the final and becoming the first Italian doubles champions at the tournament. Following the title win, Paolini reached the top 10 in doubles at world No. 9 on 7 October 2024, becoming the only active player at the time, male or female, to be ranked in the top 10 in both singles and doubles. In singles, at the same tournament, Paolini reached the third round, where she lost to 31st seed Magda Linette. At the next WTA 1000, the Wuhan Open, on her debut, she reached the singles quarterfinals with wins over Yuan Yue and lucky loser Erika Andreeva. Paolini lost to fifth seed and eventual runner-up Zheng Qinwen. As a result, she reached a new career-high ranking of world No. 4 tying the record for the highest-ranked Italian singles female player with Francesca Schiavone on 28 October 2024.

Aged 28, Paolini became the second oldest player, after Li Na, to make their debut at the WTA Finals in November, defeating Elena Rybakina in straight sets in her opening round-robin match. She lost her second match to Aryna Sabalenka. The Italian was defeated by eventual runner-up Zheng Qinwen in her final round-robin match and subsequently did not progress to the semifinals. Partnering with Sara Errani, she also exited the doubles in the round-robin stage after compiling a record of one win and two losses. At the Billie Jean King Cup finals in Spain, Paolini defeated Moyuka Uchijima and then teamed with Sara Errani to overcome Shuko Aoyama and Eri Hozumi as Italy won their quarterfinal tie against Japan. Italy faced Poland in the semifinals and, after losing her singles match to Iga Świątek, Paolini combined again with Sara Errani to defeat Katarzyna Kawa and Świątek in the decisive doubles and secure a place in the final. She then defeated Rebecca Šramková to claim the winning points as Italy overcame Slovakia in the final to take the title. In December, Paolini and Errani were named WTA Doubles Team of the Year.

=== 2025: Rome singles and Roland Garros doubles titles ===
Seeded fourth at the Australian Open, Paolini defeated qualifier Wei Sijia and Renata Zarazúa to reach the third round, where she lost to 28th seed Elina Svitolina in three sets. Paolini and Errani won their third WTA 1000 doubles title together at Doha, defeating Jiang Xinyu and Wu Fang-hsien in the final. The following week, her defense of her Dubai Championship title ended in the third round with a loss to Sofia Kenin during which she suffered an ankle injury that forced her to withdraw from the doubles competition at the tournament.

At the Miami Open in March, wins over Rebecca Šramková, Ons Jabeur, Naomi Osaka and Magda Linette saw Paolini reach the semifinals, where she lost to world No. 1, Aryna Sabalenka. In April, the Italian defeated wildcard entrants Eva Lys and Jule Niemeier and then overcame fourth seed Coco Gauff to make it through to the semifinals at the Stuttgart Open, where her run was once again ended by Aryna Sabalenka. Paolini changed tennis coaches at this time. She broke with longtime coach Renzo Furlan (2020 - Apr 2025) and joined with Marc López

In May, having never gone beyond the second round in Rome, Paolini defeated Lulu Sun, Ons Jabeur, and Jeļena Ostapenko to reach the quarterfinals of her home WTA 1000 for the first time. She defeated Diana Shnaider and Peyton Stearns to reach her second WTA 1000 final and first on clay. She defeated Coco Gauff in the final to win her third title, becoming the second Italian woman in the Open Era, after Raffaella Reggi in 1985, and the first to do so when the tournament was at Tier 5 or WTA 1000 level. Paolini won also the doubles title, defeating Elise Mertens and Veronika Kudermetova in the final, defending the title won the previous year. She became the first Italian woman to win both the singles and doubles titles at the tournament in the same year since Raffaella Reggi in 1985, and the first woman to win both the singles and doubles titles at the tournament in the same year since Monica Seles in 1990.

At the French Open with her partner Sara Errani, Paolini lifted her first major tournament doubles trophy defeating Anna Danilina and Aleksandra Krunić in the final. In singles, also at the French Open, she reached the fourth round and was defeated by Elina Svitolina for the second successive major tournament. Moving onto the grass-court season, Paolini and Errani were runners-up at the Berlin Open, losing Tereza Mihalikova and Olivia Nicholls. The following week, she reached the semifinals at the Bad Homburg Open, at which point she lost to Iga Świątek. The Italian defeated Anastasija Sevastova in the first round at Wimbledon, before losing her next match to Kamilla Rakhimova. After her loss, Paolini fired her coach Marc López. In July, she announced Italian player Federico Gaio as her interim coach until the US Open. Paolini then reached the final of the Cincinnati Open in August, where she was defeated in straight sets by Iga Świątek. At the US Open, Paolini lost to Markéta Vondroušová in the singles third round, while she and Errani made it through to the doubles semifinals, losing to eventual champions Gabriela Dabrowski and Erin Routliffe.

In September, Paolini was part of the Italy team which retained the BJK Cup, winning all four matches she was involved in, including overcoming Jessica Pegula in the final against the United States. Alongside Sara Errani, she defended their doubles title at the China Open, defeating Miyu Kato and Fanny Stollár in the final to claim their third WTA 1000 trophy of the year. Paolini followed this up by reaching back-to-back singles semifinals at the Wuhan Open, where she lost to Coco Gauff, and at Ningbo Open, losing to Elena Rybakina. For the second successive year, Paolini qualified for the singles and, with Sara Errani, the doubles at the WTA Finals in Riyadh, but was eliminated in the group stages of both.

=== 2026: Out of top 30 ===
Paolini started the season at the Australian Open, where she exited early in both singles, in the third round against 29th seed Iva Jovic, and in doubles, where she and Errani were ousted in the second round.

After this, Paolini failed to get past the third round in any of the first four Masters 1000 events of the season. Her best early season performance came as top seed at the Mérida Open, where she received a bye and then recorded wins over lucky loser Priscilla Hon and wildcard entrant Katie Boulter to make it into the semifinals, at which point she lost to eventual champion Cristina Bucșa In doubles, Paolini and Errani finished runners-up at the Miami Open, losing in the final to Kateřina Siniaková and Taylor Townsend.

Defending her title at the Italian Open in May, Paolini lost to 21st seed Elise Mertens in the third round and as a consequence saw her 101 week run in the world's top 10 come to an end. She went into the French Open hampered by a foot injury which forced her to withdraw from attempting to defend her doubles title. In the singles, Paolini defeated Dayana Yastremska, before losing in the second round to world No. 68 Solana Sierra after letting slip a lead of a set and a break of serve.

Beginning her grass court season at the Eastbourne Open, she lost to eventual finalist Tatjana Maria in the first round. Seeded 13th at Wimbledon, Paolini defeated qualifier Robin Montgomery, Viktorija Golubic, Maria Sakkari and 29th seed Alexandra Eala to reach the quarterfinals, where she was eliminated by 12th seed Marta Kostyuk. She was scheduled to play in the doubles with Sara Errani but withdrew as she continued to manage her ongoing foot injury.

At the start of the North American hard court swing of the season, her ongoing foot problem forced Paolini to pull out of the Washington Open and Canadian Open. She later also withdrew from the Cincinnati Open for the same reason. Seeded 19th, Paolini made her comeback at the US Open and recorded wins over Veronika Erjavec and qualifier Lucrezia Stefanini, before losing to 16th seed Sorana Cîrstea in the third round.

In October, following her second round loss to Daria Snigur at the China Open, where she was 14th seed and defending quarterfinal points from the previous year, Paolini dropped out of the WTA top 30 for the first time since January 2024. At the last WTA 1000 event of the year, the Wuhan Open, she was eliminated in the third round by Sonay Kartal in a match where she lost 11 games in a row from 2–1 ahead in the first set. In the next two weeks, she lost to fourth seed Iva Jovic in the second round at the Ningbo Open and to seventh seed Naomi Osaka in the first round at the Pan Pacific Open. At the latter event, she teamed with Sara Errani to win the doubles title, defeating top seeds Gabriela Dabrowski and Luisa Stefani in the final. They also secured a spot at the end of season WTA Finals for the third consecutive year when they overcame Tereza Mihalikova and Olivia Nicholls in the semifinals. Two weeks later at the Finals in Indian Wells, Errani and Paolini topped their group by winning all three of their round-robin matches, before defeating Hanyu Guo and Kristina Mladenovic to reach the final for the first time. They lost the championship match to Kateřina Siniaková and Taylor Townsend.

== Playing style ==
Paolini's playing style is dynamic and aggressive, characterized by solid groundstrokes. She uses heavy topspin on her forehand, but hits flat on her backhand. Due to her height 163 cm (5 ft 4 in), she has stated, "I wish I was taller, because I could serve better." However, she possesses great speed and agility, a credit to her shorter stature, allowing her to outmaneuver opponents.

== Records ==
- Longest Wimbledon semifinal (2024) versus Donna Vekić, lasting two hours and 51 minutes.
- Joint highest ranked Italian female player in history (with Francesca Schiavone) at No. 4.
- Aged 28, second oldest player (after Li Na who was 29) to make their debut at the WTA Finals.
- She co-shares with Monica Seles the record of winning 2025 Italian Open in both singles and doubles the same year (Seles’ record in 1990).
- At the WTA 1000 Italian Open, most awarded double team with Sara Errani and the only team to win two titles in a row.
- At the WTA 1000 China Open, only team with Sara Errani to successfully defend the women’s doubles title at the event.

== Rivalries ==
Paolini has forged rivalries with several top players on the WTA Tour as well as with fellow Italians. Her matches against major champions and established top 10 players have become key markers in her rise, with some encounters seen as among the highlights of her career. Against Aryna Sabalenka, the Italian has played eight times, trailing 2–6. Their encounters have often come deep in tournaments, including the Stuttgart Open quarterfinal, where Sabalenka prevailed in straight sets. Both of Paolini’s wins came on clay, reflecting her comfort on slower surfaces against the Belarusian’s power. Paolini has faced Iga Świątek seven times, losing first six meetings. They played in 2024 the 2024 French Open final. The latest clash came at the Italian defeating Świątek in straight sets, 6–1, 6–2, in the quarterfinals of the Master 1000 2025 Wuhan Open. The rivalry highlights Świątek’s dominance from the baseline against Paolini’s counterpunching game.

Paolini and Elena Rybakina have met six times, with the head-to-head tied 3–3. Their most significant encounter came at the 2024 French Open quarterfinal, where the Italian scored one of the biggest wins of her career by defeating Rybakina in three sets to reach her first major semifinal. Against former Top-5 Caroline Garcia, the French won their head-to-head, 5–3, in their eight meetings. Last time the Italian defeated Garcia was at the 2025 Qatar Ladies Open second round in straight sets, 6–3, 6–4. Paolini has played Coco Gauff seven times and the American leads the series 4–3. Their most notable clash came in the Italian Open final, where Paolini defeated Gauff to win the biggest title of her career in front of a home crowd.

Her rivalry with Daria Kasatkina is evenly balanced at 3–3 after six meetings. The most recent contest came at the Eastbourne International, where Kasatkina rallied from a set down to defeat Paolini in three sets. Paolini and Ons Jabeur have met six times, with the head-to-head tied at 3–3. Among Italians, Paolini has shared a rivalry with Martina Trevisan, meeting seven times with Paolini leading 5–2. Their encounters have often come at WTA events and Fed Cup ties, symbolizing the growing depth of Italian women’s tennis.

== Career statistics ==
=== Performance timelines ===
Key
W	F	SF	QF	#R	RR	Q#	DNQ	A	NH

(W) winner; (F) finalist; (SF) semifinalist; (QF) quarterfinalist; (#R) rounds 4, 3, 2, 1; (RR) round-robin stage; (Q#) qualification round; (DNQ) did not qualify; (A) absent; (NH) not held; (SR) strike rate (events won / competed); (W–L) win–loss record.
To avoid confusion and double counting, these charts are updated at the conclusion of a tournament or when the player's participation has ended.

Current through the 2026 US Open.

==== Singles ====
Tournament	2015	2016	2017	2018	2019	2020	2021	2022	2023	2024	2025	2026	SR	W–L	Win%
Australian Open	A	A	Q1	Q1	Q1	1R	1R	1R	1R	4R	3R	3R	0 / 7	7–7	50%
French Open	A	A	Q1	Q1	1R	2R	2R	1R	2R	F	4R	2R	0 / 8	13–8	62%
Wimbledon	A	A	Q2	Q1	Q1	NH	1R	1R	1R	F	2R	QF	0 / 6	11–6	65%
US Open	A	A	Q2	Q2	Q2	1R	2R	1R	1R	4R	3R	3R	0 / 7	8–7	53%
Win–loss	0–0	0–0	0–0	0–0	0–1	1–3	2–4	0–4	1–4	18–4	8–4	9–4	0 / 28	39–28	58%

==== Doubles ====
Tournament	2015	2016	2017	2018	2019	2020	2021	2022	2023	2024	2025	2026	SR	W–L	Win%
Australian Open	A	A	A	A	A	A	3R	2R	1R	3R	2R	2R	0 / 6	7–6	54%
French Open	A	A	A	A	A	2R	1R	1R	2R	F	W	A	1 / 6	13–5	72%
Wimbledon	A	A	A	A	A	NH	A	1R	1R	3R	2R	A	0 / 4	3–4	43%
US Open	A	A	A	A	A	A	1R	A	1R	2R	SF	A	0 / 4	5–4	56%
Win–loss	0–0	0–0	0–0	0–0	0–0	1–1	2–3	1–3	1–4	10–4	12–3	1–1	1 / 20	28–19	60%

=== Grand Slam tournaments ===
==== Singles: 2 (runner-ups) ====
Result	Year	Tournament	Surface	Opponent	Score
Loss	2024	French Open	Clay	(Poland) Iga Świątek	2–6, 1–6
Loss	2024	Wimbledon	Grass	(Czech Republic) Barbora Krejčíková	2–6, 6–2, 4–6

==== Doubles: 2 (1 title, 1 runner-up) ====
Result	Year	Tournament	Surface	Partner	Opponents	Score
Loss	2024	French Open	Clay	(Italy) Sara Errani	(United States) Coco Gauff (Czech Republic) Kateřina Siniaková	6–7^{(5–7)}, 3–6
Win	2025	French Open	Clay	(Italy) Sara Errani	(Kazakhstan) Anna Danilina (Serbia) Aleksandra Krunić	6–4, 2–6, 6–1

=== Year-end championships ===
==== Doubles: 1 (runner-up) ====
Result	Year	Tournament	Surface	Partner	Opponents	Score
Loss	2026	WTA Finals, US	Hard	(Italy) Sara Errani	(Czech Republic) Kateřina Siniaková (United States) Taylor Townsend	4–6, 3–6

=== Summer Olympics ===
==== Doubles: 1 (gold medal) ====
Result	Year	Tournament	Surface	Partner	Opponents	Score
Gold	2024	Paris Summer Olympics	Clay	(Italy) Sara Errani	Mirra Andreeva; Diana Shnaider	2–6, 6–1, [10–7]

=== Awards and honours ===
Paolini has received the following awards and honours:

==== Professional awards ====
- WTA Doubles Team of the Year – 2024
- Billie Jean King Cup Heart Award – 2024
- ITF Women's Doubles World Champion (2) – 2024, 2025

==== Orders ====
- CONI Golden Collar of Sports Merit (Collare d'Oro al Merito Sportivo) – 2024

==== Special awards ====
- Golden Pegasus of Tuscany (Pegaso d'Oro della Regione Toscana) – 2025

== Notes ==
Awards
Preceded by (Australia) Storm Hunter & (Belgium) Elise Mertens	WTA Doubles Team of the Year; 2024 (with (Italy) Sara Errani)	Succeeded by (Czech Republic) Kateřina Siniaková & (United States) Taylor Townsend
Preceded by (Australia) Storm Hunter & (Belgium) Elise Mertens	ITF Women's Doubles World Champions; 2024, 2025 (with (Italy) Sara Errani)	Succeeded by Incumbent
