= 2021 Upper Austria Ladies Linz – Doubles =

Doubles
- 2021 Upper Austria Ladies Linz

Final
- Champions: (Russia) Natela Dzalamidze (Russia) Kamilla Rakhimova
- Runners-up: (China) Wang Xinyu (China) Zheng Saisai
- Score: 6–4, 6–2

Details
- Draw: 16
- Seeds: 4

Events
Singles	Doubles
- Linz Open

Arantxa Rus and Tamara Zidanšek were the defending champions, but chose not to participate.

Natela Dzalamidze and Kamilla Rakhimova won the title, defeating Wang Xinyu and Zheng Saisai in the final, 6–4, 6–2.

== Seeds ==
1. (Germany) Julia Lohoff / (Czech Republic) Renata Voráčová (quarterfinals)
2. (Georgia (country)) Oksana Kalashnikova / (Japan) Miyu Kato (semifinals)
3. (Russia) Natela Dzalamidze / (Russia) Kamilla Rakhimova (champions)
4. (Poland) Alicja Rosolska / (New Zealand) Erin Routliffe (first round)

== Draw ==
Key

- Q = Qualifier
- WC = Wild card
- LL = Lucky loser
- Alt = Alternate
- ITF = ITF entry
- PR = Protected ranking
- SR = Special ranking
- SE = Special exempt
- JE = Junior exempt
- JR = Junior Accelerator Programme entrant
- CO = College Accelerator Programme entrant
- NG = Next Gen Accelerator Program entrant
- w/o = Walkover
- r = Retired
- d = Defaulted

=== Draw ===
First round
1	(Germany) J Lohoff (Czech Republic) R Voráčová	6	6
(Russia) A Fomina-Klotz (Russia) Ekaterina Yashina	3	4
PR	(Russia) I Khromacheva (Belarus) L Marozava	7^{7}	7^{7}
(India) A Raina (Netherlands) R van der Hoek	6^{3}	6^{2}
3	(Russia) N Dzalamidze (Russia) K Rakhimova	6	6
(Germany) V Heisen (Belgium) K Zimmermann	3	4
(Romania) M Buzărnescu (Poland) K Piter	6	3	[10]
(Slovakia) V Kužmová (Russia) A Panova	1	6	[8]
(China) Xin Wang (China) S Zheng	7	6
WC	(Austria) J Grabher (Austria) S Kraus	5	0
(Russia) E Alexandrova (Russia) Y Sizikova	4	6	[12]
4	(Poland) A Rosolska (New Zealand) E Routliffe	6	1	[10]
(France) E Lechemia (United States) I Neel	1	6	[10]
PR	(Germany) M Barthel (Chinese Taipei) Y-c Hsieh	6	3	[8]
(Japan) E Hozumi (Slovakia) T Mihalíková	2	3
2	(Georgia (country)) O Kalashnikova (Japan) M Kato	6	6

Quarterfinals
1	(Germany) J Lohoff (Czech Republic) R Voráčová	3	4
PR	(Russia) I Khromacheva (Belarus) L Marozava	6	6
3	(Russia) N Dzalamidze (Russia) K Rakhimova	3	7	[10]
(Romania) M Buzărnescu (Poland) K Piter	6	5	[6]
(China) Xin Wang (China) S Zheng	6	6
(Russia) E Alexandrova (Russia) Y Sizikova	3	3
(France) E Lechemia (United States) I Neel	6	6^{5}	[5]
2	(Georgia (country)) O Kalashnikova (Japan) M Kato	3	7^{7}	[10]

Semifinals
PR	(Russia) I Khromacheva (Belarus) L Marozava	4	2
3	(Russia) N Dzalamidze (Russia) K Rakhimova	6	6
(China) Xin Wang (China) S Zheng	6	2	[10]
2	(Georgia (country)) O Kalashnikova (Japan) M Kato	4	6	[6]

Final
3	(Russia) N Dzalamidze (Russia) K Rakhimova	6	6
(China) Xin Wang (China) S Zheng	4	2
