= Sabina Simmonds =

Italian tennis player

- Country (sports): Italy
- Born: 17 April 1960 (age 65) London, England
- Plays: Right-handed
- Prize money: US$ 141,852

Singles
- Career record: -
- Highest ranking: No. 31 (14 February 1983)

Grand Slam singles results
- Australian Open: 1R (1978)
- French Open: 1R (1977, 1978, 1980, 1982, 1983, 1984, 1986)
- Wimbledon: 3R (1982, 1983)
- US Open: 3R (1979)

Doubles
- Career record: -

Grand Slam doubles results
- Australian Open: SF (1978)

Sabina Simmonds (born 17 April 1960) is a retired tennis player from Italy. She competed in the Fed Cup from 1978 to 1984.

== WTA career finals ==
=== Singles: 2 (2 runner-ups) ===
Result	W-L	Date	Tournament	Surface	Opponent	Score
Loss	0–1	Oct 1978	Barcelona Open, Spain	Clay	(Czechoslovakia) Hana Mandlíková	1–6, 7–5, 3–6
Loss	0–2	Nov 1981	Hong Kong Open	Hard	(Australia) Wendy Turnbull	3–6, 4–6

== ITF finals ==
=== Singles (7–9) ===
Legend
$25,000 tournaments
$15,000 tournaments

Result	No.	Date	Tournament	Surface	Opponent	Score
Loss	1.	18 April 1976	ITF Sezze, Italy	Clay	(Australia) Chris O'Neil	3–6, 1–6
Loss	2.	11 July 1976	ITF Menton, France	Clay	(Belgium) Monique Van Haver	4–6, 7–5, 2–6
Loss	3.	16 April 1978	ITF Turin, Italy	Clay	(Czechoslovakia) Hana Strachoňová	1–6, 1–6
Loss	4.	14 May 1978	ITF Rome, Italy	Clay	(Canada) Marjorie Blackwood	1–6, 6–0, 5–7
Loss	5.	15 May 1979	ITF Monte Carlo, Monaco	Clay	(West Germany) Helga Masthoff	3–6, 1–6
Win	6.	24 July 1979	ITF Geneva, Switzerland	Clay	(United States) Sandy Collins	6–3, 6–3
Win	7.	12 August 1979	ITF Taormina, Italy	Clay	(Spain) Carmen Perea	6–4, 7–6
Loss	8.	31 August 1980	ITF Stuttgart, West Germany	Clay	(West Germany) Claudia Kohde-Kilsch	7–5, 0–6, 2–6
Win	9.	26 July 1981	ITF Piedmont, Italy	Clay	(Italy) Ionita Nesti	6–4, 7–5
Loss	10.	2 August 1981	ITF Pesaro, Italy	Clay	(Czechoslovakia) Lea Plchová	0–6, 1–6
Win	11.	16 August 1981	ITF Nicolosi, Italy	Clay	(Czechoslovakia) Lea Plchová	6–1, 4–6, 6–3
Loss	12.	23 August 1981	ITF Catania, Italy	Clay	(Czechoslovakia) Lea Plchová	3–6, 7–6, 5–7
Win	13.	30 August 1981	ITF Stuttgart, West Germany	Clay	(Hungary) Andrea Temesvári	6–3, 7–5
Win	14.	14 February 1982	ITF Bakersfield, United States	Hard	(United States) Lea Antonoplis	6–2, 6–1
Win	15.	10 July 1983	ITF Gstaad, Switzerland	Clay	(Switzerland) Christiane Jolissaint	6–3, 6–7, 6–3
Loss	16.	15 September 1986	ITF Sofia, Bulgaria	Clay	(Netherlands) Marianne van der Torre	4–6, 2–6

=== Doubles (4–5) ===
Result	No.	Date	Tournament	Surface	Partner	Opponents	Score
Loss	1.	10 August 1980	ITF Fort Myers, United States	Clay	(United States) Carrie Meyer	(United States) Diane Desfor (United States) Barbara Hallquist	3–6, 1–6
Loss	2.	31 August 1980	ITF Stuttgart, West Germany	Clay	(Netherlands) Elly Appel-Vessies	(West Germany) Claudia Kohde-Kilsch (West Germany) Eva Pfaff	3–6, 4–6
Win	3.	5 April 1981	ITF Napoli, Italy	Clay	(Romania) Florența Mihai	(Sweden) Nina Bohm (Sweden) Åsa Flodin	7–6, 6–4
Loss	4.	12 April 1981	ITF Catania, Italy	Clay	(Romania) Florența Mihai	(Czechoslovakia) Marcela Skuherská (Czechoslovakia) Lea Plchová	2–6, 3–6
Loss	5.	19 April 1981	ITF Taranto, Italy	Clay	(Romania) Florența Mihai	(Czechoslovakia) Marcela Skuherská (Czechoslovakia) Lea Plchová	2–6, 3–6
Win	6.	26 July 1981	ITF Loano, Italy	Clay	(Poland) Iwona Kuczyńska	(Hungary) Katalin Farkas (Hungary) Éva Rózsavölgyi	6–3, 6–1
Win	7.	9 August 1981	ITF Sezze, Italy	Clay	(Poland) Iwona Kuczyńska	(Australia) Chris O'Neil (Sweden) Mimmi Wikstedt	6–0, 6–4
Win	8.	16 August 1981	ITF Nicolosi, Italy	Clay	(Poland) Iwona Kuczyńska	(Argentina) Andrea Tiezzi (Argentina) Isabelle Villaverde	6–3, 6–1
Loss	9.	15 April 1985	ITF Caserta, Italy	Clay	(West Germany) Gabriela Dinu	(Italy) Patrizia Murgo (Italy) Barbara Romanò	6–4, 5–7, 4–6
