= 1985 Italian Open – Women's singles =

Women's singles
- 1985 Italian Open

Final
- Champion: (Italy) Raffaella Reggi
- Runner-up: (United States) Vicki Nelson-Dunbar
- Score: 6–4, 6–4

Details
- Draw: 16 (2Q/1LL)
- Seeds: 4

Events
| Singles | men | women |
| Doubles | men | women |
| ← 1984 · | Italian Open | · 1986 → |

Raffaella Reggi defeated Vicki Nelson-Dunbar in the final, 6–4, 6–4 to win the women's singles tennis title at the 1985 Italian Open. Reggi was the first Italian woman to win the tournament in the Open Era.

Manuela Maleeva was the reigning champion, but did not compete this year.

== Seeds ==
1. (West Germany) Myriam Schropp (quarterfinals)
2. (Italy) Raffaella Reggi (champion)
3. (Czechoslovakia) Iva Budařová (quarterfinals)
4. (Italy) Sandra Cecchini (first round)

== Draw ==
=== Key ===
- Q = Qualifier
- WC = Wild card
- LL = Lucky loser
- Alt = Alternate
- ITF = ITF entry
- PR = Protected ranking
- SR = Special ranking
- SE = Special exempt
- JE = Junior exempt
- JR = Junior Accelerator Programme entrant
- CO = College Accelerator Programme entrant
- NG = Next Gen Accelerator Program entrant
- w/o = Walkover
- r = Retired
- d = Defaulted

=== Draw ===
First Round
1 | (West Germany) M Schropp | 4 | 6 | 6
(United States) E Longo | 6 | 4 | 4
Q | (Italy) L Golarsa | 1 | 6 | 1
(United States) V Nelson-Dunbar | 6 | 2 | 6
4 | (Italy) S Cecchini | 2 | 1
(Italy) L Garrone | 6 | 6
LL | (West Germany) I Cueto | 6 | 6
(Sweden) C Jexell | 2 | 1
Q | (Italy) C Nozzoli | 0 | 6 | 6
(Greece) A Kanellopoulou | 6 | 1 | 2
(Czechoslovakia) M Skuherská | 2 | 4
3 | (Czechoslovakia) I Budařová | 6 | 6
(Argentina) A Villagrán | 6 | 6 | 2
(Czechoslovakia) K Skronská | 4 | 7 | 6
(United States) J Golder | 2 | 4
2 | (Italy) R Reggi | 6 | 6

Quarterfinals
1 | (West Germany) M Schropp | 2 | 0
(United States) V Nelson-Dunbar | 6 | 6
(Italy) L Garrone | 6 | 4 | 6
LL | (West Germany) I Cueto | 3 | 6 | 2
Q | (Italy) C Nozzoli | 7 | 2 | 6
3 | (Czechoslovakia) I Budařová | 5 | 6 | 0
(Czechoslovakia) K Skronská | 6 | 3 | 4
2 | (Italy) R Reggi | 3 | 6 | 6

Semifinals
(United States) V Nelson-Dunbar | 6 | 6
(Italy) L Garrone | 4 | 0
Q | (Italy) C Nozzoli | 0 | 1
2 | (Italy) R Reggi | 6 | 6

Final
(United States) V Nelson-Dunbar | 4 | 4
2 | (Italy) R Reggi | 6 | 6
