= 1991 Torneo Internazionale Femminile di Palermo =

- Date: 8–14 July
- Edition: 4th
- Category: Tier V
- Draw: 32S / 16D
- Prize money: $75,000
- Surface: Clay / outdoor
- Location: Palermo, Italy
- Venue: Country Time Club

Champions

Singles
- (France) Mary Pierce

Doubles
- (France) Mary Pierce / (Czechoslovakia) Petra Langrová
← 1990 ·	Torneo Internazionale Femminile di Palermo	· 1992 →

The 1991 Torneo Internazionale Femminile di Palermo was a women's tennis tournament played on outdoor clay courts at the Country Time Club in Palermo, Italy that was part of the Tier V category of the 1991 WTA Tour. It was the fourth edition of the tournament and was held from 8 July until 14 July 1991. Unseeded Mary Pierce won the singles title and earned $13,500 first-prize money.

== Finals ==
=== Singles ===
(France) Mary Pierce defeated (Italy) Sandra Cecchini 6–0, 6–3

- It was Pierce's first singles title of her career.

=== Doubles ===
(France) Mary Pierce / (Czechoslovakia) Petra Langrová defeated (Italy) Laura Garrone / (Argentina) Mercedes Paz 6–3, 6–7^{(5–7)}, 6–3
