= Patrizia Murgo =

Italian tennis player (born 1962)

- Country (sports): Italy
- Born: 26 March 1962 (age 63)
- Prize money: $21,713

Singles
- Career record: 11–13

Grand Slam singles results
- French Open: Q2 (1980)
- Wimbledon: Q1 (1980, 1981)
- US Open: Q3 (1982)

Doubles
- Career record: 21–8

Grand Slam doubles results
- French Open: 2R (1985)
- US Open: 3R (1982)

Grand Slam mixed doubles results
- French Open: 2R (1983)
Medal record
Mediterranean Games
Bronze medal – third place	1979 Split	Women's doubles

Patrizia Murgo (born 26 March 1962) is an Italian former professional tennis player.

== Tennis career ==
Murgo, a native of Florence, was the first Italian to reach an Orange Bowl final when she finished runner-up to Kathy Horvath in 1979. She was also a women's doubles bronze medalist at that year's Mediterranean Games in Split, with Antonella Rosa as her partner.

In 1981 and 1982, Murgo was a member of the Italy Federation Cup team as a doubles specialist, usually partnering Sabina Simmonds. She won six of her eight Federation Cup doubles rubbers.

While competing on the WTA circuit her best result in a singles tournament came at the 1981 Italian Open, where she reached the round of 16. As a doubles player she had a runner-up finish at the 1985 Italian Open.

== WTA Tour finals ==
=== Doubles: 1 (0-1) ===
Result	Date	Tournament	Tier	Surface	Partner	Opponents	Score
Loss	May 1985	Taranto, Italy	$50,000	Clay	(Italy) Barbara Romanò	(Italy) Sandra Cecchini (Italy) Raffaella Reggi	6–1, 4–6, 3–6

== See also ==
- List of Italy Fed Cup team representatives
