= Barbara Romanò =

Italian tennis player

- Full name: Barbara Romanò
- Country (sports): Italy
- Born: 14 January 1965 (age 61)
- Prize money: $103,090

Singles
- Highest ranking: No. 74 (23 October 1989)

Grand Slam singles results
- French Open: 2R (1988, 1990)
- Wimbledon: 1R (1988, 1990)
- US Open: 1R (1989)

Doubles
- Highest ranking: No. 88 (25 September 1989)

Grand Slam doubles results
- French Open: 2R (1985, 1989)
- Wimbledon: 1R (1989, 1990)
- US Open: 1R (1989, 1990)

Barbara Romanò (born 14 January 1965) is a former professional tennis player from Italy.

== Biography ==
Romanò, who comes from Tuscany, began competing on tour in 1983 and reached a best singles ranking of 74 in the world.

Her best performance in singles on the WTA Tour was a semi-final appearance at the 1989 Vitosha New Otani Open in Sofia and she twice reached the second round of the French Open.

As a doubles player she was runner-up in two WTA Tour tournaments, both in her home country: the 1985 Italian Open and 1990 Torneo Internazionale.

== WTA Tour finals ==
=== Doubles (0-2) ===
Result	Date	Tournament	Tier	Surface	Partner	Opponents	Score
Loss	May 1985	Taranto, Italy	$50,000	Clay	(Italy) Patrizia Murgo	(Italy) Sandra Cecchini (Italy) Raffaella Reggi	6–1, 4–6, 3–6
Loss	Jul 1990	Palermo, Italy	$75,000	Clay	(Argentina) Florencia Labat	(Italy) Laura Garrone (Luxembourg) Karin Kschwendt	2–6, 4–6

== ITF finals ==
=== Singles (9-1) ===
$25,000 tournaments
$10,000 tournaments

Result	No.	Date	Tournament	Surface	Opponent	Score
Win	1.	May 6, 1985	Bournemouth, United Kingdom	Hard	(South Africa) Dianne Van Rensburg	6–1, 6–4
Win	2.	July 15, 1985	Subiaco, Italy	Clay	(Argentina) Mariana Pérez Roldán	7–6, 6–1
Win	3.	July 22, 1985	Sezze, Italy	Clay	(Argentina) Mariana Pérez Roldán	6–2, 6–4
Win	4.	July 29, 1985	Neumünster, West Germany	Clay	(Netherlands) Hellas ter Riet	6–3, 0–6, 7–5
Win	5.	July 28, 1986	Sezze, Italy	Clay	(Italy) Laura Golarsa	6–2, 6–2
Win	6.	September 29, 1986	Sibenik, Yugoslavia	Clay	(Czechoslovakia) Radka Zrubáková	6–2, 6–2
Loss	7.	June 22, 1987	Francaville, Italy	Clay	(Italy) Federica Bonsignori	6–1, 6–7, 4–6
Win	8.	March 28, 1988	Rome, Italy	Clay	(Italy) Stefania Dalla Valle	6–3, 6–1
Win	9.	June 10, 1991	Rome, Italy	Clay	(Czechoslovakia) Janette Husárová	7–5, 2–6, 6–3
Win	10.	August 26, 1991	Ronchis, Italy	Clay	(Croatia) Maja Palaveršić	6–2, 6–1

=== Doubles (9-3) ===
Result	No.	Date	Tournament	Surface	Partner	Opponents	Score
Win	1.	July 2, 1984	Carpi, Italy	Clay	(Italy) Antonella Canapi	(Italy) Elizabeth Lazzeri (Italy) Andrea Meister	7–5, 4–6, 6–4
Loss	2.	July 30, 1984	Sezze, Italy	Clay	(Italy) Patrizia Murgo	(Italy) Antonella Canapi (Argentina) Isabelle Villaverde	6–3, 5–7, 1–6
Loss	3.	August 6, 1984	Subiaco, Italy	Clay	(Italy) Patrizia Murgo	(Czechoslovakia) Hana Fukárková (Czechoslovakia) Lea Plchová	4–6, 6–2, 4–6
Win	4.	April 15, 1985	Caserta, Italy	Clay	(Italy) Patrizia Murgo	(West Germany) Gabriela Dinu (Italy) Sabina Simmonds	4–6, 7–5, 6–4
Win	5.	April 22, 1985	Monviso, Italy	Clay	(Italy) Patrizia Murgo	(Argentina) Mariana Pérez Roldán (Argentina) Patricia Tarabini	7–6, 7–5
Win	6.	July 15, 1985	Subiaco, Italy	Clay	(Italy) Patrizia Murgo	(Argentina) Mariana Pérez Roldán (Argentina) Patricia Tarabini	6–2, 6–1
Win	7.	July 22, 1985	Sezze, Italy	Clay	(Italy) Patrizia Murgo	(Argentina) Mariana Pérez Roldán (Argentina) Patricia Tarabini	3–6, 6–3, 6–2
Win	8.	September 22, 1986	Bol, Yugoslavia	Clay	(Italy) Silvia La Fratta	(Czechoslovakia) Denisa Krajčovičová (Czechoslovakia) Alice Noháčová	7–5, 6–3
Loss	9.	July 6, 1987	Paliano, Italy	Clay	(Italy) Laura Lapi	(Indonesia) Yayuk Basuki (Indonesia) Suzanna Wibowo	4–6, 6–2, 0–6
Win	10.	September 5, 1988	Agliana, Italy	Clay	(Italy) Marzia Grossi	(Finland) Anne Aallonen (Finland) Nanne Dahlman	4–6, 7–6, 6–4
Win	11.	April 10, 1989	Palermo, Italy	Clay	(Italy) Marzia Grossi	(Australia) Rachel McQuillan (Australia) Kristine Kunce	6–3, 6–2
Win	12.	August 26, 1991	Ronchis, Italy	Clay	(Italy) Marzia Grossi	(Croatia) Maja Palaveršić (Czechoslovakia) Monika Kratochvílová	6–4, 7–5
