= Aleksandra Krunić =

Serbian tennis player (born 1993)

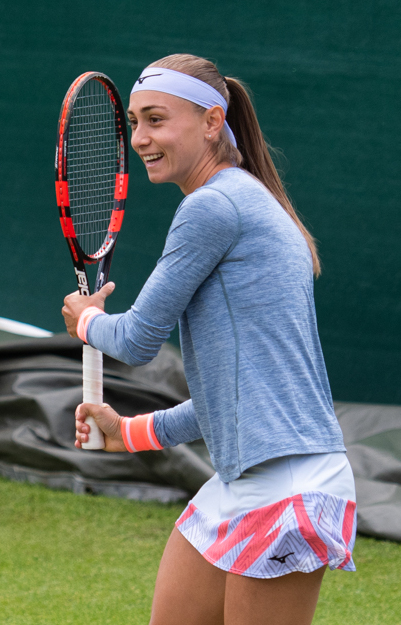
- Krunić at the 2022 Birmingham Classic
- Country (sports): Serbia
- Born: 15 March 1993 (age 33) Moscow, Russia
- Height: 1.63 m (5 ft 4 in)
- Turned pro: 2008
- Plays: Right-handed (two-handed backhand)
- Coach: Robert Cokan, Elise Tamaëla (2016–18); Sarah Stone (2018)
- Prize money: $4,985,549

Singles
- Career record: 401–311
- Career titles: 1
- Highest ranking: No. 39 (18 June 2018)
- Current ranking: No. 1,325 (3 August 2026)

Grand Slam singles results
- Australian Open: 2R (2019)
- French Open: 2R (2019, 2022)
- Wimbledon: 3R (2015)
- US Open: 4R (2014)

Other tournaments
- Olympic Games: 1R (2016)

Doubles
- Career record: 292–217
- Career titles: 9
- Highest ranking: No. 4 (18 May 2026)
- Current ranking: No. 5 (8 June 2026)

Grand Slam doubles results
- Australian Open: F (2026)
- French Open: F (2025, 2026)
- Wimbledon: QF (2021)
- US Open: 3R (2015, 2025)

Other doubles tournaments
- Olympic Games: 1R (2016, 2021)

Grand Slam mixed doubles results
- Australian Open: QF (2026)
- Wimbledon: 2R (2022)
- US Open: Q1 (2026)

Team competitions
- Fed Cup: F (2012), record 28–14
- Last updated on: 8 August 2026.

Aleksandra Krunić (Serbian Cyrillic: Александра Крунић; born 15 March 1993) is a Serbian professional tennis player. She was a doubles finalist at the 2025 and 2026 French Open and at the 2026 Australian Open, partnering Anna Danilina. She has a career-high doubles rankings of world No. 4, achieved in May 2026. Her best singles ranking is No. 39, reached in June 2018. Krunić has won ten WTA Tour titles combined, one in singles and nine in doubles, along with one WTA 125 singles title.

Krunić was a runner-up in the girls' doubles at the 2009 Australian Open, with Sandra Zaniewska. She made her WTA Tour debut at 2010 Slovenia Open, playing doubles with world No. 2, Jelena Janković, and made her WTA singles debut at the 2011 Budapest Grand Prix. At the 2014 US Open, in her second main-draw appearance at a Grand Slam tournament, Krunić won her first main-draw match and then reached the fourth round, beating 27th seed Madison Keys and third seed Petra Kvitová in the process. She also has wins in the qualifying rounds over former top-5 players Francesca Schiavone and Daniela Hantuchová.

Krunić has wins over former top-10 players, Timea Bacsinszky, while she was coming back from injury, as well as over Kimiko Date and Roberta Vinci in their last career matches, which were played in front of their home crowds in Tokyo and Rome, in 2017 and 2018, respectively. She has wins over Garbiñe Muguruza, Petra Kvitová, Jeļena Ostapenko, Elina Svitolina, Johanna Konta, CoCo Vandeweghe, Sara Errani, Vinci, Madison Keys, Ekaterina Makarova and Caroline Garcia.

== Personal life ==
Krunić was born to Bratislav and Ivana Krunić in Moscow and has a sister named Anastasia. She resides in Moscow, Bratislava and Belgrade, and speaks – beside Serbian – Slovak, Russian and English fluently.

== Career ==
=== Junior years ===
Krunić picked up a tennis racquet aged seven. She began training tennis at the Spartak Moscow club, which spawned numerous tennis stars such as Anna Kournikova, Elena Dementieva, Marat Safin, Anastasia Myskina, Igor Andreev and others. Since then Krunić has been coached by Edouard Safonov. In 2006, Krunić reached the semifinals of junior Kremlin Cup, losing to Dalia Zafirova. The following year, she won junior events in Podgorica, Livorno and Maia. In 2008, Krunić reached the quarterfinals of European Junior Championships in Moscow and won the junior event in Budapest. She also played at the junior event in Kramfors, however, withdrew from the final match against Croatian Silvia Njirić due to injury by a score of 6–3, 3–1 for Njirić.

In 2009, she played the second round of Australian Open in girls' singles and the final of girls' doubles event, partnering with Sandra Zaniewska. The two lost to Christina McHale and Ajla Tomljanović in the super-tiebreaker. She reached the second round of both girls' singles and doubles at the French Open, and lost in the first round of girls' singles at Wimbledon. Krunić also partnered with Tamara Čurović at the girls' doubles, however, they lost in the first round to Tímea Babos and Ajla Tomljanović. In April 2009, she reached her highest junior ranking when she was ranked world No. 17.

Although she had decided not to play juniors anymore, Krunić took part in the European Championships organized by both ITF and Tennis Europe, along with Bojana Jovanovski and Doroteja Erić in the team of Serbia.

=== 2008–2010: ITF Circuit success ===
As a member of TK Red Star, Krunić won the national club championships in 2008. She was awarded with a wildcard for the tennis event in Prokuplje, Serbia organized by the ITF. On 6 July 2008, Krunić won the tournament and became the youngest title winner in 2008 by winning this event. In October 2008, she played two ITF events in Dubrovnik losing both times in the first round.

Krunić was invited by Serbia Fed Cup team coach Dejan Vraneš to join the team for the 2009 Fed Cup World Group play-offs versus Spain. Jelena Janković and Ana Ivanovic secured Serbia's 4–0 win. Krunić debuted in a doubles match played on 25 April 2009, along with Ana Jovanović, and they were down 6–2, 1–0 against Llagostera Vives and Domínguez Lino, when the match was cancelled due to rain. In 2009, Krunić won a total of three ITF titles, including first in doubles. On 14 September 2009, she was ranked No. 795.

In January 2010, Krunić won her fourth ITF tournament in Quanzhou, China defeating domestic player Zhou Yimiao in the final, beating top seed and compatriot Bojana Jovanovski in semifinal. In May, she won ITF singles title in Moscow and was the doubles runner-up. Krunić made her WTA Tour debut at the Slovenia Open, playing doubles with world No. 2 and compatriot Janković. The two reached semifinals beating the fourth seeds Eleni Daniilidou and Jasmin Wöhr en route, but then had to withdraw from their semifinal match due to an injury of Janković.

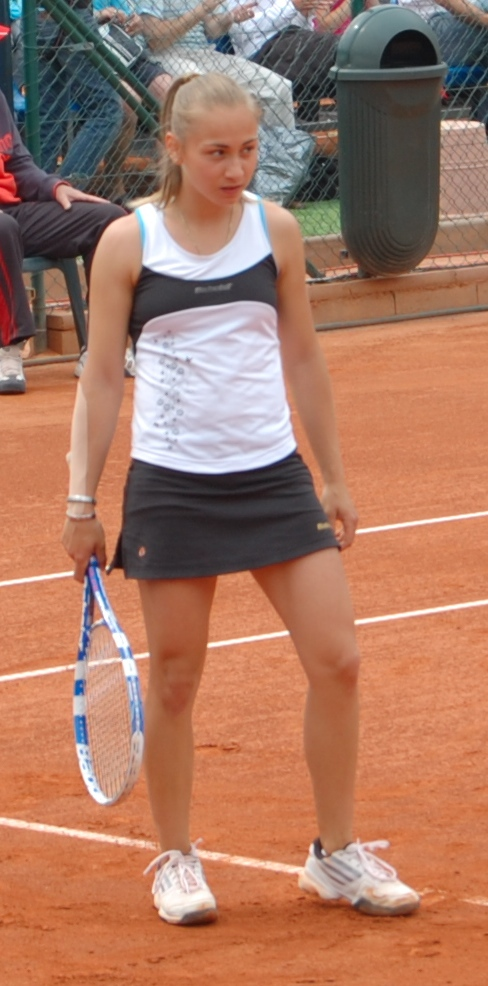
Krunić in Prague, 2011

=== 2011–2012: WTA Tour singles debut ===
In February 2011, Krunić again was invited to play for Serbia Fed Cup team in the World Group II rubber against Canada. She lost her debut singles match against world No. 84, Rebecca Marino, in three sets. Krunić played the final doubles match with Bojana Jovanovski, beating Fichman and Pelletier to guarantee Serbia the spot in the World Group Play Offs. Serbia won that tie 3–2 against Slovakia, after Krunić and Janković having beaten Hantuchová and Rybáriková in three sets, rallying from 2–6, 1–5. With this win, Serbia qualified for the World Group.

In May 2011, Krunić qualified for the 100k Sparta Prague Open and reached the semifinals, before losing to world No. 10, Petra Kvitová, in straight sets. At Wimbledon and the US Open, she lost in qualifying. Krunić qualified for her first WTA Tour singles event in Budapest. She was leading against Nina Bratchikova 7–5, 1–0, when Bratchikova retired. Krunić lost her following match to third seed Klára Zakopalová. She played in Tashkent, and after qualification, Krunić won her second tour match, losing just one game to Kamila Farhad, before losing to Sorana Cîrstea, in two tight sets.

At the 2012 Australian Open, Krunić failed to qualify in the final round against Lesia Tsurenko. In February, she was again a part of the Fed Cup team; she lost to Yanina Wickmayer but won in doubles with Bojana Jovanovski to claim a historic victory for Serbia. In 2012, Krunić won one ITF title and lost one final in both singles and doubles. At the next Grand Slam tournaments, she failed to qualify. In Baku, Krunić reached her first tour main draw of the season and finished as a quarterfinalist for the first time. She beat fourth seed Andrea Hlaváčková, and in the second round Laura Pous Tió, but lost in three sets to eventual champion Bojana Jovanovski.

=== 2013: Major debut ===
Krunić started season playing at the Australian Open qualifying, losing to Maria Elena Camerin in the third set. At WTA Tour events in Bogotá and Acapulco, Krunić did not qualify. In Irapuato, Mexico, she beat Olga Savchuk for her first ITF title of the year and seventh overall, dropping not a single set in the entire tournament. She played four clay-court tournaments and the best result was in Trnava, Slovakia when she reached semifinals beating top 100 player and top seed Jana Čepelová in the first round, but Barbora Záhlavová-Strýcová was better in two sets in the semifinal. At the French Open, she lost in three sets to Mariana Duque Marino in the second qualifying round.

After missing Wimbledon, Krunić played in WTA Tour events in Budapest and Baku without qualifying. In Baku, she was the only player who won a set against eventual champion Elina Svitolina. In doubles, Krunić played alongside Eleni Daniilidou and reached her first tour doubles final but they lost in three sets. US Open was the first major where she qualified for the main draw – she beat Carina Witthöft, Daria Gavrilova and Louisa Chirico, all in two sets. But in the first round, CoCo Vandeweghe was better in two sets. Week after US Open, she played an event in Trabzon, Turkey and won her last ITF title of the season, beating Stéphanie Foretz Gacon in the final. At the WTA events in Linz and Luxembourg, she had to qualify. In Linz, she did it but lost to lucky loser Maryna Zanevska, in three sets. In doubles, Krunić won three ITF titles during the season and lost in two finals.

=== 2014: Top 100, WTA Tour doubles title ===
In first round of qualifying at the Australian Open, Krunić lost to Zarina Diyas in three sets. In January, she qualified for the Pattaya Open, but then lost to Nicha Lertpitaksinchai. Next she played three ITF events and best result was quarterfinal where she lost to Timea Bacsinszky. In the WTA Tour event in Katowice, Krunić didn't qualify for the main draw, but she beat former top-30 player Tamira Paszek. In Kuala Lumpur, she lost in the first round to Karolína Plíšková in two sets. On clay, she made it to the semifinals at two ITF tournaments. At French Open and Wimbledon, she failed to qualify. At the WTA Tour event in Bucharest, she beat Alexandra Panova in the first round, but lost in the second to world No. 3, Simona Halep, in a match full of breaks. Last prepare for US Open was at an ITF event in Poland where she lost in early round of singles, but won doubles title alongside Barbora Krejčíková.

At the US Open, Krunić again qualified for her second main-draw appearance. In the first round, she played against good friend Katarzyna Piter and won her first ever main-draw match at a major tournament. In the second round, 27th seed Madison Keys awaited. Although they finished the match with the same number of points, Krunić won in three sets and subsequently defeated third seed and reigning Wimbledon champion, Petra Kvitová in the third round in straight sets. With that win, she was guaranteed a world ranking in the top 100 for the first time. In the round of 16, Krunić lost to 16th seed and two time US Open finalist, Victoria Azarenka, in three sets. 18-time major champion Martina Navratilova said of Krunić during the match "what a find she is, what an athlete". During the tournament, Krunić's compatriots Janković, Ivanovic and Jovanovski gave her advice and support. She was nominated a "Rising star of the month", but Belinda Bencic had more votes by 5%. Also, the match against Azarenka was one of ten matches nominated for Grand Slam match of the year award.

The Asian Swing started for Krunić in Tashkent. Despite losing to Lesia Tsurenko in the first round of singles, she managed to capture her first career title playing doubles alongside Siniaková. They beat all opponents in three sets en route to the final, where they beat Margarita Gasparyan and Alexandra Panova, in straight sets. In her hometown Moscow, she beat Caroline Garcia but lost to Tsvetana Pironkova in the second round. In doubles, Krunić and Siniaková beat top-seeded top-10 players Makarova and Vesnina in the first round.

=== 2015–2018: Wimbledon & two US Open third rounds, top 50 ===
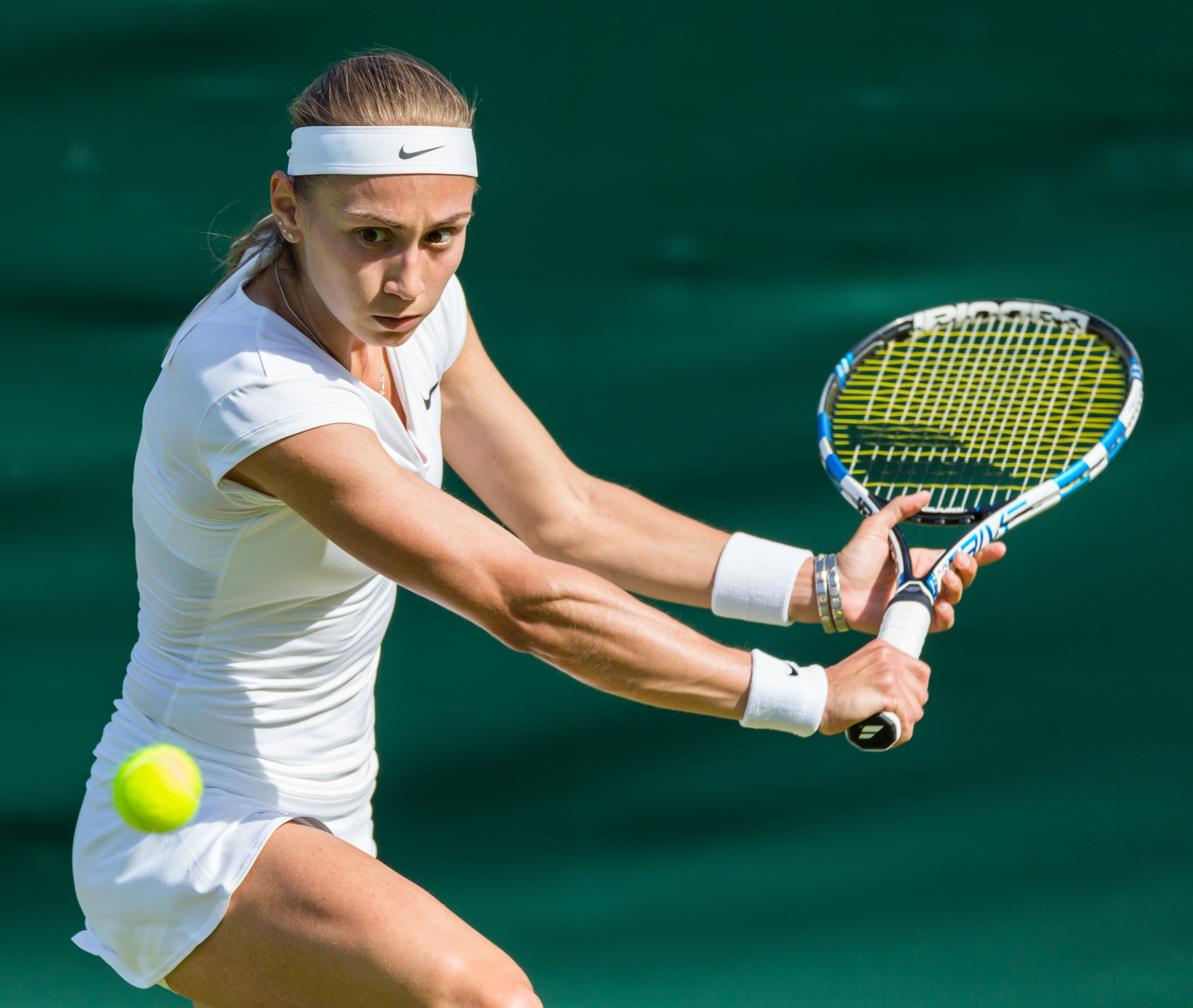
Krunić in her first-round match at Wimbledon 2015

Before the 2015 season, Krunić won an ITF title in Ankara in late December as the top seed, saving a few match points en route. In Shenzhen, she qualified and then in the second round won against Anna Schmiedlová, rallying from 3–6, 2–5 and saving match points. In the quarterfinal, eventual champion Simona Halep was better in straight sets. At the Australian Open, Krunić played her first major event without qualifying, and was beaten in first round by Lauren Davis. She beat Schmiedlová in Acapulco again, but lost her next four matches on hardcourt. In Prague on clay, she upset Mirjana Lučić-Baroni, but lost narrowly to Yanina Wickmayer. At the French Open, she lost to Yulia Putintseva.

Krunić started grass-court season playing in Birmingham, where she qualified and beat Heather Watson in the first round, but lost next to Svetlana Kuznetsova. She then had her best result of the year in terms of importance, as she reached the third round of Wimbledon with wins over 19th seed Sara Errani and former world No. 11, Roberta Vinci. She lost to Venus Williams in straight sets.

Krunić returned to clay playing at the Bucharest Open where she reached the quarterfinals. She beat Elizaveta Kulichkova and Roberta Vinci again, losing just two games, but lost to Polona Hercog. However, she didn't win a match at her next six tournaments, including US Open loss to Danka Kovinić. She also played doubles alongside Janković and they reached third round but lost match for quarterfinal against fourth seeds Dellacqua and Shvedova, as they led 6–2, 4–2 and also 4–2 in third set.

She won her first match since six-match losing streak in Tashkent Open, beating Anett Kontaveit but lost to Jovanovski. At the next tournament in Linz, she won five matches to reach her third quarterfinal of the year. She won three qualifying rounds, including wins over Anastasija Sevastova and Kaia Kanepi, to reach the main draw. There she defeated previous month's US Open finalist, Roberta Vinci (for the third time in only five months) and Mona Barthel, before losing to eventual champion Anastasia Pavlyuchenkova. She played at next event in Moscow but lost to Lesia Tsurenko.

Krunić reached a new career-high ranking of No. 62 in July, but finished the year at No. 96.

=== 2022–2023: Serbian No. 1, injury, hiatus ===
Coming back from wrist injury, Krunić qualified for the main draw at Roland Garros. She beat Kamilla Rakhimova in straight sets in the first round, before losing in the second to 29th seed Veronika Kudermetova.

In June, as a lucky loser she entered the main draw of Birmingham Classic, where she managed to beat Petra Martić in straight sets, in the first round, before losing to sixth seed Sorana Cîrstea. The following week, Krunić qualified for the main draw at the Eastbourne International where she lost in the first round, in three tight sets, to Australian Ajla Tomljanović. At Wimbledon, she met again 26th seed Sorana Cîrstea in the first round and lost in two tiebreak sets.

In July, Krunić beat Laura Siegemund in straight sets in the first round of the Budapest Grand Prix. In the second, she beat sixth seed Zhang Shuai, while in the quarterfinals she defeated Wang Xiyu. Next, she reached her third career singles final defeating third seed and defending champion Yulia Putintseva. She lost the final to Bernarda Pera. As a result, she returned to the top 100 becoming the Serbian female player No. 1. Her next tournament was the Hamburg European Open where she beat Sabine Lisicki, in straight sets, before losing to the fourth seed Aliaksandra Sasnovich.

At the US Open, she defeated Elina Avanesyan in straight sets in the first round. In the second, she managed to beat 23rd seed and Roland Garros 2021 champion Barbora Krejčíková to reach the third round for a fourth time at this major, before losing to Ludmilla Samsonova. As a result, she moved back into the top 75 after several years of absence. In September, Krunić was the top seed in qualifying for the Tallinn Open. In her first match, she was 6–4, 5–4 up against Eva Lys and serving for the match, when she tore her knee which resulted in total ACL rupture.

=== 2024: Comeback, WTA Tour singles quarterfinal ===
Ranked No. 400 and also using protected ranking at the Rosmalen Open in 's-Hertogenbosch, she recorded her first win after her comeback to the tour over Jessika Ponchet. Next, she reached her first WTA Tour quarterfinal since 2022 and first on grass in six years, since she won the tournament, defeating top seed Jessica Pegula in three tight sets.

=== 2025: Doubles: Major final and career titles ===
Partnering Sabrina Santamaria, Krunić was runner-up in the doubles at the Auckland Open, losing to Jiang Xinyu and Wu Fang-hsien in the final.

In April, she won her seventh doubles title at Open de Rouen, again partnering Santamaria. In the final, they defeated top-seeded Irina Khromacheva and Linda Nosková in straight sets. In June, she reached the doubles final at the French Open with Anna Danilina. They lost in three sets to second seeds Sara Errani and Jasmine Paolini.

In August, she paired up with Danilina again and won WTA 250 Tennis in the Land tournament, beating second seeds Chan Hao-ching and Jiang Xinyu in straight sets. At the 2025 US Open, she and Danilina lost in third round to Asia Muhammad and Demi Schuurs. With Danilina, Krunić reached the quarterfinals at the China Open where they lost to Priscilla Hon and Karolína Muchová in straight sets and were finalists at the Wuhan Open where they were defeated by Storm Hunter and Kateřina Siniaková.

In October, Krunić and Danilina reached the quarterfinals again at the Ningbo Open but lost to Nicole Melichar-Martinez and Liudmila Samsonova. They were also runners-up at the Pan Pacific Open. Krunić reached a career-high doubles ranking of world No. 17, on 27 October 2025. In her last doubles tournament of the year, Krunić paired up with Alena Fomina-Klotz and participated in the Fujairah Championships, reaching the quarterfinals. In singles of that same tournament, she lost to Daria Zelinskaya in the first qualifying round.

=== 2026: Australian Open doubles final, world No. 4 ===
Together with Danilina again, she reached the semifinals in Brisbane International and lost to Cristina Bucșa and Ellen Perez. In Adelaide International, they reached the semifinals again losing in three sets to Siniaková and Zhang Shuai who later won the tournament.

At the Australian Open, Krunić and Danilina again upset top seeds Siniaková and Taylor Townsend in the quarterfinals to reach the semifinal stage at this major. They defeated the fifth seeded pair of Gabriela Dabrowski and Luisa Stefani to reach the final. As a result, Krunić reached the top 15 in the WTA doubles rankings on 2 February 2026. They lost to Elise Mertens and Zhang Shuai in the final. Krunić also participated in mixed doubles pairing up with Mate Pavić with whom she managed to reach the quarterfinals.

In Doha, Krunić and Danilina saved a championship point against Hsieh Su-wei and Jeļena Ostapenko at 6–0, 5–3 down, winning their first WTA 1000 doubles title as a team. It was Krunić's first WTA 1000 doubles title, and Danilina's second. In singles, Krunić played qualifiers in both Adelaide and Doha but lost in the first round.

Following another semifinal showing with Danilina at the next Middle East tournament, the Dubai Championships, Krunić reached the top 10 at world No. 8, on 23 February 2026. They lost to Dabrowski and Stefani this time, having defeated them twice before in Australia and in Doha.

Seeded fifth with Danilina, she lost in the first round of the 2026 Miami Open to Jiang Xinyu and Xu Yifan. At the 2026 Charleston Open, Krunić paired up with Zhang Shuai in doubles and reached the quarterfinals, where they lost to the eventual champions, Desirae Krawczyk and Caty McNally. At the Madrid Open, she and Kristina Mladenovic reached the semifinals, before losing to eventual champions Siniaková and Townsend. She reached world No. 4 in doubles on 18 May 2026, following the 2026 Italian Open.

== Performance timelines ==
Key
W	F	SF	QF	#R	RR	Q#	P#	DNQ	A	Z#	PO	G	S	B	NMS	NTI	P	NH

(W) winner; (F) finalist; (SF) semifinalist; (QF) quarterfinalist; (#R) rounds 4, 3, 2, 1; (RR) round-robin stage; (Q#) qualification round; (P#) preliminary round; (DNQ) did not qualify; (A) absent; (Z#) Davis/Fed Cup Zonal Group (with number indication) or (PO) play-off; (G) gold, (S) silver or (B) bronze Olympic/Paralympic medal; (NMS) not a Masters tournament; (NTI) not a Tier I tournament; (P) postponed; (NH) not held; (SR) strike rate (events won / competed); (W–L) win–loss record.
To avoid confusion and double counting, these charts are updated at the conclusion of a tournament or when the player's participation has ended.

Only main-draw results in WTA Tour, Grand Slam tournaments, Fed Cup/BJK Cup and Olympic Games are included in win–loss records.

=== Singles ===
Current through the 2026 Qatar Open.

Tournament	2009	2010	2011	2012	2013	2014	2015	2016	2017	2018	2019	2020	2021	2022	2023	2024	2025	SR	W–L	Win %
Grand Slam tournaments
Australian Open	A	A	A	Q3	Q1	Q1	1R	1R	Q2	1R	2R	Q1	Q3	Q1	A	1R	A	0 / 5	1–5	17%
French Open	A	A	A	Q1	Q2	Q2	1R	Q1	Q3	1R	2R	A	1R	2R	A	1R	A	0 / 6	2–6	25%
Wimbledon	A	A	Q1	A	A	Q1	3R	1R	Q3	1R	1R	NH	Q2	1R	Q1	A	A	0 / 5	2–5	29%
US Open	A	A	Q2	Q2	1R	4R	1R	1R	3R	3R	1R	A	A	3R	A	A	A	0 / 8	9–8	53%
Win–loss	0–0	0–0	0–0	0–0	0–1	3–1	2–4	0–3	2–1	2–4	2–4	0–0	0–1	3–3	0–0	0–2	0–0	0 / 24	14–24	37%
National representation
Summer Olympics	NH			A	NH			1R	NH				A	NH		A		0 / 1	0–1	0%
Billie Jean King Cup (Note: Formerly known as Fed Cup until 2020.)	PO	PO	PO	F	QF	WG2	PO	PO	PO	A	PO	PO (Note: Edition is split into the two years due to COVID-19.)						0 / 2	7–6	54%
WTA 1000 tournaments
Dubai / Qatar Opens (Note: The first Premier 5 event of the year has switched back and forth between the Dubai Tennis Championships and the Qatar Ladies Open since 2009 until 2024. Dubai was classified as a Premier 5 event from 2009 to 2011 before being succeeded by Doha for the 2012–2014 period. In 2015, Dubai regained its Premier 5 status while Doha was demoted to Premier status. The Premier 5 tournaments were reclassified as WTA 1000 tournaments in 2021.)	A	A	A	A	A	A	A	A	A	1R	A	A	Q2	A		A	A	0 / 1	0–1	0%
Indian Wells Open	A	A	A	A	A	A	1R	A	A	1R	1R	NH	A	Q2		Q1	A	0 / 3	0–3	0%
Miami Open	A	A	A	A	A	A	1R	Q2	Q1	1R	1R	NH	A	Q1		1R	A	0 / 4	0–4	0%
Madrid Open	A	A	A	A	A	A	A	A	A	1R	Q1	NH	A	A		A	A	0 / 1	0–1	0%
Italian Open	A	A	A	A	A	A	A	A	A	2R	Q1	A	A	A		Q2	A	0 / 1	1–1	50%
Canadian Open	A	A	A	A	A	A	Q1	A	A	1R	A	NH	A	A		A	Q1	0 / 1	0–1	0%
Cincinnati Open	A	A	A	A	A	A	Q1	A	2R	1R	A	A	A	Q1		A	Q1	0 / 2	1–2	33%
Pan Pacific / Wuhan Open (Note: In 2014, the Pan Pacific Open was downgraded to a Premier event and replaced by the Wuhan Open. The Premier 5 tournaments were reclassified as WTA 1000 tournaments in 2021.)	A	A	A	A	A	A	A	Q1	A	2R	A	NH					A	0 / 1	1–1	50%
China Open	A	A	A	A	A	A	A	Q1	A	2R	A	NH					A	0 / 1	1–1	50%
Career statistics
Tournaments	0	0	2	1	4	6	19	12	13	23	14	0	6	10		7	3	Career total: 120		
Titles	0	0	0	0	0	0	0	0	0	1	0	0	0	0				Career total: 1		
Finals	0	0	0	0	0	0	0	0	1	1	0	0	0	1				Career total: 3		
Hard win–loss	0–0	0–0	1–2	2–2	0–3	4–5	6–12	1–5	11–8	9–14	3–9	0–0	3–4	2–3		0–4		0 / 69	42–71	37%
Clay win–loss	0–0	0–0	1–1	0–0	0–1	1–1	3–5	2–5	4–5	6–6	2–4	0–0	3–2	6–5		0–2	0–3	0 / 39	28–40	41%
Grass win–loss	0–0	0–0	0–0	0–0	0–0	0–0	3–2	1–2	0–0	6–2	0–2	0–0	0–0	1–3		2–1		1 / 13	13–12	52%
Overall win–loss	0–0	0–0	2–3	2–2	0–4	5–6	12–19	4–12	15–13	21–22	5–15	0–0	6–6	9–11	0–0	2–7	0–3	1 / 120	83–123	40%
Win %	–	–	40%	50%	0%	45%	39%	25%	54%	49%	25%	–	50%	45%	–	22%	0%	Career total: 40%		
Year-end ranking	632	224	226	168	145	101	96	147	55	57	165	236	137	101	689	287	463	$4,286,455		

=== Doubles ===
Current through 2026 Wimbledon Championships.

	2009	2010	2011	2012	2013	2014	2015	2016	2017	2018	2019	2020	2021	2022	2023	2024	2025	2026	SR	W–L	Win %
Grand Slam tournaments
Australian Open	A	A	A	A	A	A	A	A	1R	2R	1R	1R	QF	1R	A	2R	1R	F	0 / 9	10–9	53%
French Open	A	A	A	A	A	A	1R	3R	2R	2R	1R	A	1R	1R	A	1R	F	F	0 / 10	14–10	58%
Wimbledon	A	A	A	A	A	A	1R	3R	2R	1R	2R	NH	QF	2R	1R	1R	1R	3R	0 / 11	9–11	45%
US Open	A	A	A	A	A	A	3R	1R	1R	1R	2R	A	2R	1R	A	A	3R		0 / 8	6–8	43%
Win–loss	0–0	0–0	0–0	0–0	0–0	0–0	2–3	4–3	2–4	2–4	2–4	0–1	6–4	1–4	0–1	1–3	7–4	12–3	0 / 38	39–38	51%
National representation
Summer Olympics	NH			A	NH			1R	NH				1R	NH		A	NH		0 / 2	0–2	0%
Billie Jean King Cup	PO	PO	PO	F	QF	WG2	PO	PO	PO	A	PO	PO							0 / 2	7–3	70%
WTA 1000 tournaments
Qatar	A	A	A	A	A	A	A	A	A	QF	A	A	NTI	SF	A	NTI	A	W	1 / 3	9–2	82%
Dubai	A	A	A	A	A	A	A	A	A	NTI	A	A	1R	NTI	A	1R	A	SF	0 / 3	2–3	40%
Indian Wells Open	A	A	A	A	A	A	A	A	A	2R	A	NH	A	1R	A	2R	A	F	0 / 4	6–4	60%
Miami Open	A	A	A	A	A	A	A	A	1R	2R	2R	NH	A	A	A	2R	A	1R	0 / 5	3–5	38%
Madrid Open	A	A	A	A	A	A	A	A	A	A	1R	NH	A	A	A	A	A	SF	0 / 2	3–2	60%
Italian Open	A	A	A	A	A	A	A	A	A	A	QF	A	A	A	A	1R	A	2R	0 / 3	3–3	50%
Canadian Open	A	A	A	A	A	A	A	A	A	A	A	NH	A	A	A	A	2R		0 / 0	1–1	50%
Cincinnati Open	A	A	A	A	A	A	A	A	A	2R	1R	A	A	1R	A	A	1R		0 / 3	1–4	20%
Guadalajara Open	NH											A	A	QF	A	NTI			0 / 0	0–0	–
Pan Pacific / Wuhan Open	A	A	A	A	A	A	A	QF	A	1R	A	NH					F		0 / 3	6–3	67%
China Open	A	A	A	A	A	A	A	2R	A	2R	1R	NH				A	QF		0 / 4	4–4	50%
Career statistics
Tournaments	0	1	0	1	5	6	13	13	17	15	19	2	12	12	1	14	14	13	Career total: 158		
Titles	0	0	0	0	0	1	0	1	0	0	2	0	1	1	0	0	2		Career total: 6		
Finals	0	0	0	0	1	1	0	2	0	0	2	0	3	2	0	0	6		Career total: 11		
Hard win–loss	0–0	2–0	1–0	1–2	4–3	6–4	7–9	7–7	4–10	8–10	11–10	1–2	10–9	6–7	0–0	8–11	20–9	18–6	2 / 101	114–99	54%
Clay win–loss	0–0	0–0	1–0	0–0	4–3	1–1	2–4	6–2	6–6	4–2	2–4	0–0	4–2	0–2	0–0	0–2	11–2	10–3	2 / 37	51–31	62%
Grass win–loss	0–0	0–0	0–0	0–0	0–0	0–0	0–1	5–3	1–1	0–2	7–2	0–0	2–1	3–2	0–1	1–2	0–1	3–3	2 / 21	22–19	54%
Overall win–loss	0–0	2–0	2–0	1–2	8–6	7–5	9–14	18–12	11–17	12–14	20–16	1–4	16–14	9–11	0–1	9–15	31–12	31–12	6 / 159	187–151	55%
Win %	–	100%	100%	33%	57%	58%	39%	60%	39%	46%	56%	33%	57%	45%	0%				Career total: 52%		
Year-end ranking	752	363	613	345	97	91	94	47	76	66	38	64	46	54	873	67	17				

== Grand Slam tournament finals ==
=== Doubles: 3 (3 runner-ups) ===
Result	Year	Tournament	Surface	Partner	Opponents	Score
Loss	2025	French Open	Clay	(Kazakhstan) Anna Danilina	(Italy) Sara Errani (Italy) Jasmine Paolini	4–6, 6–2, 1–6
Loss	2026	Australian Open	Hard	(Kazakhstan) Anna Danilina	(Belgium) Elise Mertens (China) Zhang Shuai	6–7^{(4–7)}, 4–6
Loss	2026	French Open	Clay	(Kazakhstan) Anna Danilina	(Czech Republic) Kateřina Siniaková (United States) Taylor Townsend	2–6, 5–7

== Other significant finals ==
=== WTA 1000 ===
==== Doubles: 3 (1 title, 2 runner-ups) ====
Result	Year	Tournament	Surface	Partner	Opponents	Score
Loss	2025	Wuhan Open	Hard	(Kazakhstan) Anna Danilina	(Czech Republic) Kateřina Siniaková (Australia) Storm Hunter	3–6, 2–6
Win	2026	Qatar Ladies Open	Hard	(Kazakhstan) Anna Danilina	(Chinese Taipei) Hsieh Su-wei (Latvia) Jeļena Ostapenko	0–6, 7–6^{(7–3)}, [10–8]
Loss	2026	Indian Wells Open	Hard	(Kazakhstan) Anna Danilina	(Czech Republic) Kateřina Siniaková (United States) Taylor Townsend	6–7^{(4–7)}, 4–6

== WTA Tour finals ==
=== Singles: 3 (1 title, 2 runner-ups) ===
Legend WTA 1000 WTA 500 WTA 250 (1–2)	Finals by surface Hard (0–1) Clay (0–1) Grass (1–0)	Finals by setting Outdoors (1–2)

Result	W–L	Date	Tournament	Tier	Surface	Opponent	Score
Loss	0–1	Sep 2017	Guangzhou International, China	International (Note: The WTA International tournaments were reclassified as WTA 250 tournaments in 2021.)	Hard	(China) Zhang Shuai	2–6, 6–3, 2–6
Win	1–1	Jun 2018	Rosmalen Open, Netherlands	International	Grass	(Belgium) Kirsten Flipkens	6–7^{(0–7)}, 7–5, 6–1
Loss	1–2	Jul 2022	Budapest Grand Prix, Hungary	WTA 250	Clay	(United States) Bernarda Pera	3–6, 3–6

=== Doubles: 21 (9 titles, 12 runner-ups) ===
Legend Grand Slam (0–3) WTA 1000 (1–2) WTA 500 (2–1) WTA 250 (6–6)	Finals by surface Hard (4–9) Clay (3–2) Grass (2–1)	Finals by setting Outdoors (8–11) Indoors (1–1)

Result	W–L	Date	Tournament	Tier	Surface	Partner	Opponents	Score
Loss	0–1	Jul 2013	Baku Cup, Azerbaijan	International	Hard	(Greece) Eleni Daniilidou	(Ukraine) Irina Buryachok (Georgia (country)) Oksana Kalashnikova	6–4, 6–7^{(3–7)}, [4–10]
Win	1–1	Sep 2014	Tashkent Open, Uzbekistan	International	Hard	(Czech Republic) Kateřina Siniaková	(Russia) Margarita Gasparyan (Russia) Alexandra Panova	6–2, 6–1
Win	2–1	Apr 2016	Rabat Grand Prix, Morocco	International	Clay	(Switzerland) Xenia Knoll	(Germany) Tatjana Maria (Romania) Raluca Olaru	6–3, 6–0
Loss	2–2	Jun 2016	Rosmalen Open, Netherlands	International	Grass	(Switzerland) Xenia Knoll	(Georgia (country)) Oksana Kalashnikova (Kazakhstan) Yaroslava Shvedova	1–6, 1–6
Win	3–2	Jan 2019	Sydney International, Australia	Premier (Note: The WTA Premier tournaments were reclassified as WTA 500 tournaments in 2021.)	Hard	(Czech Republic) Kateřina Siniaková	(Japan) Eri Hozumi (Poland) Alicja Rosolska	6–1, 7–6^{(7–3)}
Win	4–2	Jun 2019	Rosmalen Open, Netherlands	International	Grass	(Japan) Shuko Aoyama	(Netherlands) Lesley Kerkhove (Netherlands) Bibiane Schoofs	7–5, 6–3
Win	5–2	May 2021	Serbia Open, Serbia	WTA 250	Clay	(Serbia) Nina Stojanović	(Belgium) Greet Minnen (Belgium) Alison Van Uytvanck	6–0, 6–2
Loss	5–3	Sep 2021	Slovenia Open, Slovenia	WTA 250	Hard	(Netherlands) Lesley Pattinama Kerkhove	(Russia) Anna Kalinskaya (Slovakia) Tereza Mihalíková	6–4, 2–6, [10–12]
Loss	5–4	Oct 2021	Transylvania Open, Romania	WTA 250	Hard (i)	(Netherlands) Lesley Pattinama Kerkhove	(Romania) Irina Bara (Georgia (country)) Ekaterine Gorgodze	6–4, 1–6, [9–11]
Win	6–4	Jun 2022	Eastbourne International, UK	WTA 500	Grass	(Poland) Magda Linette	(Ukraine) Lyudmyla Kichenok (Latvia) Jeļena Ostapenko	walkover
Loss	6–5	Aug 2022	Tennis in the Land, US	WTA 250	Hard	(Kazakhstan) Anna Danilina	(United States) Nicole Melichar-Martinez (Australia) Ellen Perez	5–7, 3–6
Loss	6–6	Jan 2025	Auckland Open, New Zealand	WTA 250	Hard	(United States) Sabrina Santamaria	(China) Jiang Xinyu (Chinese Taipei) Wu Fang-hsien	3–6, 4–6
Win	7–6	Apr 2025	Open de Rouen, France	WTA 250	Clay (i)	(United States) Sabrina Santamaria	(Russia) Irina Khromacheva (Czech Republic) Linda Nosková	6–0, 6–4
Loss	7–7	Jun 2025	French Open, France	Grand Slam	Clay	(Kazakhstan) Anna Danilina	(Italy) Sara Errani (Italy) Jasmine Paolini	4–6, 6–2, 1–6
Win	8–7	Aug 2025	Tennis in the Land, US	WTA 250	Hard	(Kazakhstan) Anna Danilina	(Chinese Taipei) Chan Hao-ching (China) Jiang Xinyu	7–6^{(7–3)}, 6–4
Loss	8–8	Oct 2025	Wuhan Open, China	WTA 1000	Hard	(Kazakhstan) Anna Danilina	(Czech Republic) Kateřina Siniaková (Australia) Storm Hunter	3–6, 2–6
Loss	8–9	Oct 2025	Pan Pacific Open, Japan	WTA 500	Hard	(Kazakhstan) Anna Danilina	(Hungary) Tímea Babos (Brazil) Luisa Stefani	1–6, 4–6
Loss	8–10	Jan 2026	Australian Open, Australia	Grand Slam	Hard	(Kazakhstan) Anna Danilina	(Belgium) Elise Mertens (China) Zhang Shuai	6–7^{(4–7)}, 4–6
Win	9–10	Feb 2026	Qatar Ladies Open, Qatar	WTA 1000	Hard	(Kazakhstan) Anna Danilina	(Chinese Taipei) Hsieh Su-wei (Latvia) Jeļena Ostapenko	0–6, 7–6^{(7–3)}, [10–8]
Loss	9–11	Mar 2026	Indian Wells Open, US	WTA 1000	Hard	(Kazakhstan) Anna Danilina	(Czech Republic) Kateřina Siniaková (United States) Taylor Townsend	6–7^{(4–7)}, 4–6
Loss	9–12	Jun 2026	French Open, France	Grand Slam	Clay	(Kazakhstan) Anna Danilina	(Czech Republic) Kateřina Siniaková (United States) Taylor Townsend	2–6, 5–7

== WTA 125 finals ==
=== Singles: 1 (title) ===
Result	W–L	Date	Tournament	Surface	Opponent	Score
Win	1–0	Jun 2017	Bol Open, Croatia	Clay	(Romania) Alexandra Cadanțu	6–3, 3–0 ret.

=== Doubles: 1 (runner-up) ===
Result	W–L	Date	Tournament	Surface	Partner	Opponents	Score
Loss	0–1	Jun 2022	Makarska International, Croatia	Clay	(Serbia) Olga Danilović	(Slovenia) Dalila Jakupović (Croatia) Tena Lukas	7–5, 2–6, [5–10]

== ITF Circuit finals ==
=== Singles: 13 (9 titles, 4 runner-ups) ===
Legend $100,000 tournaments (0–1) $50/60,000 tournaments (3–1) $25,000 tournaments (3–1) $10,000 tournaments (3–1)	Finals by surface Hard (3–0) Clay (6–3) Grass (0–1)

Result	W–L	Date	Tournament	Tier	Surface	Opponent	Score
Win	1–0	Jul 2008	ITF Prokuplje, Serbia	10,000	Clay	(Bulgaria) Tanya Germanlieva	6–4, 6–1
Loss	1–1	Jul 2009	ITF Prokuplje, Serbia	10,000	Clay	(Bulgaria) Dalia Zafirova	3–6, 6–7^{(3)}
Win	2–1	Aug 2009	ITF Velenje, Slovenia	10,000	Clay	(Croatia) Nika Ožegović	6–3, 6–1
Win	3–1	Oct 2009	ITF Dubrovnik, Croatia	10,000	Clay	(Slovakia) Karin Morgošová	6–0, 6–3
Win	4–1	Jan 2010	Quanzhou Cup, China	50,000	Hard	(China) Zhou Yimiao	6–3, 7–5
Win	5–1	May 2010	ITF Moscow, Russia	25,000	Clay	(Russia) Natalia Ryzhonkova	6–4, 4–6, 6–2
Loss	5–2	May 2012	Internazionale di Caserta, Italy	25,000	Clay	(Peru) Bianca Botto	1–6, 0–6
Win	6–2	Jun 2012	ITF Lenzerheide, Switzerland	25,000	Clay	(United States) Chiara Scholl	6–3, 6–3
Win	7–2	Mar 2013	ITF Irapuato, Mexico	25,000	Clay	(Ukraine) Olga Savchuk	7–6^{(4)}, 6–4
Win	8–2	Sep 2013	Trabzon Cup, Turkey	50,000	Hard	(France) Stéphanie Foretz	1–6, 6–4, 6–3
Win	9–2	Dec 2014	Ankara Cup, Turkey	50,000	Hard (i)	(Uzbekistan) Akgul Amanmuradova	3–6, 6–2, 7–6^{(6)}
Loss	9–3	Jun 2017	Manchester Trophy, UK	100,000	Grass	(Kazakhstan) Zarina Diyas	4–6, 4–6
Loss	9–4	Jun 2021	Macha Lake Open, Czech Rep.	W60	Clay	(China) Zheng Qinwen	6–7^{(5)}, 3–6

=== Doubles: 20 (8 titles, 12 runner-ups) ===
Legend $100,000 tournaments (2–5) $50,000 tournaments (2–3) $25,000 tournaments (3–4) $10,000 tournaments (1–0)	Finals by surface Hard (3–3) Clay (4–8) Grass (1–0) Carpet (0–1)

Result	W–L	Date	Tournament	Tier	Surface	Partner	Opponents	Score
Win	1–0	Jul 2009	ITF Prokuplje, Serbia	10,000	Clay	(Serbia) Ema Polić	(North Macedonia) Aleksandra Josifoska (Romania) Cristina Stancu	6–2, 7–6^{(3)}
Loss	1–1	May 2010	ITF Moscow, Russia	25,000	Clay	(Russia) Marina Shamayko	(Russia) Anna Arina Marenko (Russia) Ekaterina Yakovleva	2–6, 2–6
Loss	1–2	May 2012	ITF Caserta, Italy	25,000	Clay	(Switzerland) Viktorija Golubic	(Poland) Katarzyna Piter (Slovakia) Romana Tabak	2–6, 4–6
Win	2–2	Jun 2012	ITF Lenzerheide, Switzerland	25,000	Clay	(Croatia) Ana Vrljić	(Russia) Ksenia Lykina (Bulgaria) Isabella Shinikova	6–2, 6–4
Loss	2–3	Mar 2013	ITF Irapuato, Mexico	25,000	Clay	(Switzerland) Amra Sadiković	(Russia) Alla Kudryavtseva (Ukraine) Olga Savchuk	2–6, 4–6
Win	3–3	Apr 2013	ITF Tunis, Tunisia	25,000	Clay	(Poland) Katarzyna Piter	(Hungary) Réka Luca Jani (Russia) Eugeniya Pashkova	6–2, 3–6, [10–8]
Win	4–3	Aug 2013	ITF Izmir, Turkey	25,000	Hard	(Poland) Katarzyna Piter	(United States) Kristi Boxx (New Zealand) Abigail Guthrie	6–2, 6–2
Win	5–3	Sep 2013	Trabzon Cup, Turkey	50,000	Hard	(Georgia (country)) Oksana Kalashnikova	(Armenia) Ani Amiraghyan (Slovenia) Dalila Jakupović	6–2, 6–1
Loss	5–4	Dec 2013	Ankara Cup, Turkey	50,000	Hard (i)	(Greece) Eleni Daniilidou	(Ukraine) Yuliya Beygelzimer (Turkey) Çağla Büyükakçay	3–6, 3–6
Loss	5–5	Feb 2014	ITF Kreuzlingen, Switzerland	25,000	Carpet (i)	(Switzerland) Amra Sadiković	(Czech Republic) Eva Birnerová (Netherlands) Michaëlla Krajicek	1–6, 6–4, [6–10]
Loss	5–6	Apr 2014	Lale Cup Istanbul, Turkey	50,000	Hard	(Netherlands) Michaëlla Krajicek	(Czech Republic) Petra Krejsová (Czech Republic) Tereza Smitková	6–1, 6–7^{(2)}, [9–11]
Loss	5–7	Jul 2014	ITS Cup Olomouc, Czech Republic	50,000	Clay	(Czech Republic) Barbora Krejčíková	(Czech Republic) Petra Cetkovská (Czech Republic) Renata Voráčová	2–6, 6–4, [7–10]
Win	6–7	Jul 2014	ITF Warsaw Open, Poland	50,000	Clay	(Czech Republic) Barbora Krejčíková	(Ukraine) Anastasiya Vasylyeva (Ukraine) Maryna Zanevska	3–6, 6–0, [10–6]
Loss	6–8	May 2015	Empire Slovak Open, Slovakia	100,000	Clay	(Croatia) Petra Martić	(Ukraine) Yuliya Beygelzimer (Russia) Margarita Gasparyan	3–6, 2–6
Loss	6–9	May 2016	Open de Cagnes-sur-Mer, France	100,000	Clay	(Switzerland) Xenia Knoll	(Romania) Andreea Mitu (Netherlands) Demi Schuurs	4–6, 5–7
Loss	6–10	Jul 2017	Hungarian Pro Open, Hungary	100,000	Clay	(Serbia) Nina Stojanović	(Colombia) Mariana Duque Mariño (Argentina) María Irigoyen	6–7^{(3)}, 5–7
Win	7–10	Feb 2020	Cairo Open, Egypt	W100	Hard	(Poland) Katarzyna Piter	(Netherlands) Arantxa Rus (Egypt) Mayar Sherif	6–4, 6–2
Loss	7–11	Apr 2024	ITF Tokyo Open, Japan	W100	Hard	(Australia) Arina Rodionova	(South Korea) Jang Su-jeong (Australia) Kimberly Birrell	5–7, 3–6, [8–10]
Win	8–11	Jun 2024	Surbiton Trophy, UK	W100	Grass	(United States) Emina Bektas	(United Kingdom) Sarah Beth Grey (United Kingdom) Tara Moore	6–1, 6–1
Loss	8–12	Apr 2025	Oeiras Open, Portugal	W100	Hard	(United States) Sabrina Santamaria	(Portugal) Francisca Jorge (Portugal) Matilde Jorge	7–6^{(7)}, 1–6, [0–1] ret.

== National representation ==
=== Fed Cup/Billie Jean King Cup ===
Result	Date	Team competition	Surface	Partner/Team	Opponents	Score
Loss	Nov 2012	Fed Cup, Czech Republic	Hard (i)	(Serbia) Ana Ivanovic (Serbia) Jelena Janković (Serbia) Bojana Jovanovski	(Czech Republic) Petra Kvitová (Czech Republic) Lucie Šafářová (Czech Republic) Lucie Hradecká (Czech Republic) Andrea Hlaváčková	1–3

==== Singles: 19 (12–7) ====
Edition	Round	Date	Location	Opp. Team	Surface	Opponent	W/L	Result
2011	WG2	5 Feb 2011	Novi Sad (SRB)	Canada	Hard (i)	Rebecca Marino	L	3–6, 6–3, 5–7
2012	WG QF	5 Feb 2012	Charleroi (BEL)	Belgium	Hard (i)	Yanina Wickmayer	L	1–6, 0–6
2015	Z1 RR	4 Feb 2015	Budapest (HUN)	Austria	Hard (i)	Patricia Mayr-Achleitner	W	6–2, 6–2
2015	Z1 RR	5 Feb 2015	Budapest (HUN)	Hungary	Hard (i)	Tímea Babos	W	7–6^{(8–6)}, 0–6, 7–6^{(7–5)}
2015	Z1 PO	7 Feb 2015	Budapest (HUN)	Croatia	Hard (i)	Donna Vekić	W	6–1, 6–1
2015	WG2 PO	18 Apr 2015	Novi Sad (SRB)	Paraguay	Hard (i)	Verónica Cepede Royg	W	6–1, 6–3
2015	WG2 PO	19 Apr 2015	Novi Sad (SRB)	Paraguay	Hard (i)	Montserrat Gonzalez	W	6–0, 6–2
2016	WG2 PO	16 Apr 2016	Belgrade (SRB)	Belgium	Clay (i)	Kirsten Flipkens	W	6–4, 7–6^{(10–8)}
2016	WG2 PO	17 Apr 2016	Belgrade (SRB)	Belgium	Clay (i)	Yanina Wickmayer	L	6–1, 5–7, 6–8
2017	WG2 PO	22 Apr 2017	Zrenjanin (SRB)	Australia	Hard (i)	Ashleigh Barty	L	4–6, 3–6
2019	Z1 G1	7 Feb 2019	Bath (GBR)	Turkey	Hard (i)	Pemra Özgen	W	3–6, 6–4, 6–2
2019	Z1 G1	8 Feb 2019	Bath (GBR)	Croatia	Hard (i)	Donna Vekić	L	6–1, 5–7, 1–6
2019	Z1 PO	9 Feb 2019	Bath (GBR)	(United Kingdom) Great Britain	Hard (i)	Johanna Konta	L	6–7^{(1–7)}, 6–3, 2–6
2020–21	Z1 G1	7 Feb 2020	Esch-sur-Alzette (LUX)	Sweden	Hard (i)	Mirjam Björklund	W	6–2, 3–6, 6–3
2022	Z1 G1	11 Apr 2022	Antalya (TUR)	Estonia	Clay	Elena Malõgina	W	6–1, 3–6, 6–4
2022	Z1 G1	12 Apr 2022	Antalya (TUR)	Denmark	Clay	Sofia Samavati	W	6–2, 6–1
2022	Z1 G1	14 Apr 2022	Antalya (TUR)	Hungary	Clay	Dalma Gálfi	W	6–4, 6–2
2022	Z1 G1	15 Apr 2022	Antalya (TUR)	Turkey	Clay	İpek Öz	W	6–7^{(6–8)}, 6–0, 6–3
2022	Z1 PO	16 Apr 2022	Antalya (TUR)	Croatia	Clay	Petra Martić	L	6–4, 5–7, 4–6

==== Doubles: 17 (12–5) ====
Edition	Round	Date	Location	Surface	Partnering	Opp. Team	Opponents	W/L	Result
2011	WG2	6 Feb 2011	Novi Sad (SRB)	Hard (i)	Bojana Jovanovski	Canada	Sharon Fichman; Marie-Ève Pelletier	W	7–6^{(7–5)}, 6–4
2011	WG PO	17 Apr 2011	Bratislava (SVK)	Clay (i)	Jelena Janković	Slovakia	Daniela Hantuchová; Magdaléna Rybáriková	W	2–6, 7–5, 9–7
2012	WG QF	5 Feb 2012	Charleroi (BEL)	Hard (i)	Bojana Jovanovski	Belgium	Alison van Uytvanck; Yanina Wickmayer	W	7–6^{(7–2)}, 4–6, 6–1
2012	WG SF	22 Apr 2012	Moscow (RUS)	Hard (i)	Bojana Jovanovski	Russia	Anastasia Pavlyuchenkova; Elena Vesnina	L	4–6, 0–6
2013	WG PO	21 Apr 2013	Stuttgart (GER)	Clay (i)	Vesna Dolonc	Germany	Anna-Lena Grönefeld; Sabine Lisicki	L	2–6, 4–6
2015	Z1 RR	4 Feb 2015	Budapest (HUN)	Hard (i)	Ivana Jorović	Austria	Julia Grabher; Sandra Klemenschits	W	6–1, 6–3
2015	Z1 RR	5 Feb 2015	Budapest (HUN)	Hard (i)	Ivana Jorović	Hungary	Tímea Babos; Réka Luca Jani	L	6–4, 6–7^{(2–7)}, 2–6
2015	WG2 PO	19 Apr 2015	Novi Sad (SRB)	Hard (i)	Ivana Jorović	Paraguay	Verónica Cepede Royg; Montserrat Gonzalez	W	6–1, 6–4
2019	Z1 G1	7 Feb 2019	Bath (GBR)	Hard (i)	Olga Danilović	Turkey	Berfu Cengiz; İpek Soylu	W	6–2, 6–3
2019	Z1 G1	8 Feb 2019	Bath (GBR)	Hard (i)	Olga Danilović	Croatia	Darija Jurak; Ana Konjuh	W	1–6, 6–1, 6–4
2020–21	Z1 G1	6 Feb 2020	Esch-sur-Alzette (LUX)	Hard (i)	Nina Stojanović	Luxembourg	Tiffany Cornelius; Eléonora Molinaro	W	6–4, 6–2
2020–21	Z1 G1	7 Feb 2020	Esch-sur-Alzette (LUX)	Hard (i)	Nina Stojanović	Sweden	Johanna Larsson; Cornelia Lister	W	6–2, 6–1
2020–21	Z1 PO	8 Feb 2020	Esch-sur-Alzette (LUX)	Hard (i)	Nina Stojanović	Slovenia	Kaja Juvan; Tamara Zidanšek	W	6–4, 6–4
2020–21	PO	17 Apr 2020	Kraljevo (SER)	Hard (i)	Ivana Jorović	Canada	Rebecca Marino; Carol Zhao	L	7–6^{(7–4)}, 3–6, [0–10]
2022	Z1 G1	11 Apr 2022	Antalya (TUR)	Clay	Dejana Radanović	Estonia	Elena Malõgina; Maileen Nuudi	W	6–3, 6–2
2022	Z1 G1	12 Apr 2022	Antalya (TUR)	Clay	Dejana Radanović	Denmark	Rebecca Munk Mortensen; Johanne Svendsen	W	6–2, 6–2
2022	Z1 G1	14 Apr 2022	Antalya (TUR)	Clay	Dejana Radanović	Hungary	Anna Bondár; Panna Udvardy	L	3–6, 2–6

== Head-to-head records ==
=== Record against top 10 players ===
Against players who have been ranked in the top 10. Active players are in boldface.

**Player**	**Record**	**W%**	**Hard**	**Clay**	**Grass**	**Carpet**	**Last match**
**Number 1 ranked players**							
(Spain) Garbiñe Muguruza	1–0	100%	1–0	–	–	–	Won (5–7, 7–6^{(7–3)}, 1–2^{ret.}) at 2018 Brisbane
(Australia) Ashleigh Barty	0–1	0%	0–1	–	–	–	Lost (2–6, 2–6) at 2017 Brisbane
(Serbia) Jelena Janković	0–1	0%	0–1	–	–	–	Lost (4–6, 3–6) at 2016 Hong Kong
**(Czech Republic) Karolína Plíšková**	0–1	0%	0–1	–	–	–	Lost (2–6, 2–6) at 2014 Kuala Lumpur
**(United States) Venus Williams**	0–1	0%	–	–	0–1	–	Lost (3–6, 2–6) at 2015 Wimbledon
**(Belarus) Victoria Azarenka**	0–2	0%	0–1	0–1	–	–	Lost (3–6, 3–6) at 2018 Madrid
**(Romania) Simona Halep**	0–2	0%	0–1	0–1	–	–	Lost (2–6, 4–6) at 2015 Shenzhen
Number 2 ranked players							
**(Spain) Paula Badosa**	1–0	100%	–	1–0	–	–	Won (6–2, 1–0^{ret.}) at 2018 Rabat
**(Belarus) Aryna Sabalenka**	1–0	100%	–	–	1–0	–	Won (6–0, 6–2) at 2017 Manchester
**(Czech Republic) Barbora Krejčíková**	2–1	67%	2–0	0–1	–	–	Won (2–6, 6–4, 6–2) at 2022 US Open
(Estonia) Anett Kontaveit	1–2	33%	1–2	–	–	–	Lost (3–6, 5–7) at 2021 Cluj-Napoca 2
**(Czech Republic) Petra Kvitová**	1–2	33%	1–1	0–1	–	–	Lost (3–6, 4–6) at 2018 Wuhan
(Russia) Svetlana Kuznetsova	0–1	0%	–	–	0–1	–	Lost (2–6, 1–6) at 2015 Birmingham
(Poland) Agnieszka Radwańska	0–1	0%	0–1	–	–	–	Lost (4–6, 3–6) at 2016 Shenzhen
Number 3 ranked players							
**(United States) Jessica Pegula**	1–0	100%	–	–	1–0	–	Won (7–6^{(7–3)}, 6–7^{(3–7)}, 6–4) at 2024 's-Hertogenbosch
**(Ukraine) Elina Svitolina**	1–2	33%	1–2	–	–	–	Won (0–6, 6–4, 7–6^{(7–4)}) at 2018 Beijing
**(Greece) Maria Sakkari**	0–2	0%	0–1	0–1	–	–	Lost (5–7, 1–6) at 2018 Istanbul
Number 4 ranked players							
(Japan) Kimiko Date	1–0	100%	1–0	–	–	–	Won (6–0, 6–0) at 2017 Tokyo
**(France) Caroline Garcia**	1–0	100%	1–0	–	–	–	Won (6–4, 6–2) at 2014 Moscow
(United Kingdom) Johanna Konta	1–2	33%	1–1	–	0–1	–	Lost (6–7^{(1–7)}, 6–3, 3–6) at 2019 Fed Cup
(Italy) Francesca Schiavone	0–1	0%	–	0–1	–	–	Lost (1–6, 6–2, 1–6) at 2016 Osprey
(Australia) Samantha Stosur	0–1	0%	–	0–1	–	–	Lost (4–6, 4–6) at 2016 Charleston
(Netherlands) Kiki Bertens	0–3	0%	–	0–3	–	–	Lost (3–6, 1–6) at 2019 Palermo
Number 5 ranked players							
**(Italy) Sara Errani**	1–1	50%	–	0–1	1–0	–	Lost (3–6, 2–6) at 2016 Bucharest
**(Latvia) Jeļena Ostapenko**	1–1	50%	1–1	–	–	–	Lost (3–6, 6–7^{(7–9)}) at 2019 US Open
**(Canada) Eugenie Bouchard**	0–1	0%	0–1	–	–	–	Lost (3–6, 4–6) at 2016 Australian Open
(Czech Republic) Lucie Šafářová	0–2	0%	0–1	0–1	–	–	Lost (3–6, 4–6) at 2017 Taipei
Number 6 ranked players							
(Spain) Carla Suárez Navarro	0–1	0%	0–1	–	–	–	Lost (2–6, 2–6) at 2017 Cincinnati
Number 7 ranked players							
(Italy) Roberta Vinci	4–0	100%	2–0	1–0	1–0	–	Won (2–6, 6–0, 6–3) at 2018 Rome
**(United States) Madison Keys**	1–2	33%	1–2	–	–	–	Lost (6–4, 1–6, 2–6) at 2018 US Open
Number 8 ranked players							
(Russia) Ekaterina Makarova	2–0	100%	1–0	1–0	–	–	Won (1–6, 6–1, 6–4) at 2018 Istanbul
**(Russia) Daria Kasatkina**	0–1	0%	–	0–1	–	–	Lost (3–6, 1–6) at 2015 Bad Gastein
Number 9 ranked players							
(Switzerland) Timea Bacsinszky	1–1	50%	1–0	–	–	0–1	Won (6–2, 3–6, 6–0) at 2018 US Open
**(Russia) Veronika Kudermetova**	1–1	50%	–	0–1	1–0	–	Lost (3–6, 3–6) at 2022 French Open
(United States) CoCo Vandeweghe	1–1	50%	0–1	–	1–0	–	Won (2–6, 7–6^{(7–4)}, 7–6^{(7–1)}) at 2018 's-Hertogenbosch
(Germany) Julia Görges	0–1	0%	0–1	–	–	–	Lost (3–6, 3–6) at 2017 US Open
(Germany) Andrea Petkovic	0–1	0%	–	0–1	–	–	Lost (4–6, 2–6) at 2021 Cluj-Napoca 1
Number 10 ranked players							
**(Brazil) Beatriz Haddad Maia**	1–0	100%	–	1–0	–	–	Won (1–6, 6–2, 6–0) at 2017 Bol
**(France) Kristina Mladenovic**	0–2	0%	0–2	–	–	–	Lost (1–6, 4–6) at 2016 Olympics
**Total**	**25–42**	**37%**	**15–23**	**4–15**	**6–3**	**0–1**	**current as of 26 August 2024**

=== Wins over top-10 players ===
- Krunić's match record against players who were, at the time the match was played, ranked in the top 10.

Season	2014	...	2017	2018	...	2024	Total
Wins	1		1	2		1	**5**

#	Player	Rank	Event	Surface	Rd	Score
**2014**
1.	(Czech Republic) Petra Kvitová	No. 4	US Open	Hard	3R	6–4, 6–4
**2017**
2.	(United Kingdom) Johanna Konta	No. 7	US Open	Hard	1R	4–6, 6–3, 6–4
**2018**
3.	(Spain) Garbiñe Muguruza	No. 2	Brisbane International	Hard	2R	5–7, 7–6^{(3)}, 1–2 ret.
4.	(Ukraine) Elina Svitolina	No. 5	China Open	Hard	1R	0–6, 6–4, 7–6^{(4)}
**2024**
5.	(United States) Jessica Pegula	No. 5	Rosmalen Open	Grass	2R	7–6^{(7–3)}, 6–7^{(3–7)}, 6–4

== Junior Grand Slam tournament finals ==
=== Doubles: 1 (runner-up) ===
Result	Year	Tournament	Surface	Partner	Opponents	Score
Loss	2009	Australian Open	Hard	(Poland) Sandra Zaniewska	(United States) Christina McHale (Croatia) Ajla Tomljanović	1–6, 6–2, [4–10]

== Awards ==
- 2007 – Tennis Europe Silver Medal for Player of the Year U–14
- 2012 – Serbian Women's Team of The Year (as part of Serbia Fed Cup team)

== See also ==
- Serbia Fed Cup team

== Notes ==
Preceded by Jelena Janković; Nina Stojanović	Serbian Tennis number one 11 September 2017 – 16 June 2019; 21 March 2022 – Present	Succeeded by Ivana Jorović incumbent
