= 2009 Fed Cup World Group play-offs =

Part of tennis tournament

The World Group play-offs were four ties which involved the losing nations of the World Group first round and the winning nations of the World Group II. Nations that won their play-off ties entered the 2010 World Group, while losing nations joined the 2010 World Group II.

== Spain vs. Serbia ==
Spain
0
Club de Tennis Lleida, Lleida, Spain
25–26 April 2009
Red clay (outdoors)

Serbia
4

			1	2	3
1	(Spain) (Serbia)	María José Martínez Sánchez; Jelena Janković	3; 6	4; 6
2	(Spain) (Serbia)	Anabel Medina Garrigues; Ana Ivanovic	6; 3	1; 6	2; 6
3	(Spain) (Serbia)	Anabel Medina Garrigues; Jelena Janković	3; 6	6; 3	3; 6
4	(Spain) (Serbia)	María José Martínez Sánchez; Ana Jovanović	6; 3	3; 6	6^{0} 7^{7}
5	(Spain) (Serbia)	Lourdes Domínguez Lino / Nuria Llagostera Vives; Ana Jovanović / Aleksandra Krunić				not played

== France vs. Slovakia ==
France
3
Palais des Sports, Limoges, France
25–26 April 2009
Red clay (indoors)

Slovakia
2

			1	2	3
1	(France) (Slovakia)	Alizé Cornet; Daniela Hantuchová	7^{7} 6^{2}	3; 6	4; 6
2	(France) (Slovakia)	Amélie Mauresmo; Dominika Cibulková	4; 6	6; 2	6; 3
3	(France) (Slovakia)	Alizé Cornet; Dominika Cibulková	2; 6	7; 5	4; 6
4	(France) (Slovakia)	Amélie Mauresmo; Daniela Hantuchová	7; 5	6; 4
5	(France) (Slovakia)	Nathalie Dechy / Amélie Mauresmo; Dominika Cibulková / Daniela Hantuchová	4; 6	6; 1	6; 4

== Germany vs. China ==
Germany
3
Frankfurter TC 1914 Palmengarten, Frankfurt, Germany
25–26 April 2009
Red clay (outdoors)

China
2

			1	2	3
1	(Germany) (China)	Sabine Lisicki; Zheng Jie	6; 4	2; 6	6; 4
2	(Germany) (China)	Anna-Lena Grönefeld; Peng Shuai	4; 6	6; 4	6; 2
3	(Germany) (China)	Anna-Lena Grönefeld; Zheng Jie	5; 7	4; 6
4	(Germany) (China)	Tatjana Malek; Peng Shuai	2; 6	6; 2	5; 7
5	(Germany) (China)	Anna-Lena Grönefeld / Sabine Lisicki; Peng Shuai / Zheng Jie	4; 6	7; 5	6; 2

== Argentina vs. Ukraine ==
Argentina
0
Club Nautico Mar del Plata, Mar del Plata, Argentina
25–26 April 2009
Red clay (outdoors)

Ukraine
5

			1	2	3
1	(Argentina) (Ukraine)	Jorgelina Cravero; Mariya Koryttseva	6; 4	5; 7	2; 6
2	(Argentina) (Ukraine)	María Irigoyen; Alyona Bondarenko	3; 6	3; 6
3	(Argentina) (Ukraine)	Jorgelina Cravero; Alyona Bondarenko	1; 6	2; 6
4	(Argentina) (Ukraine)	Aranza Salut; Olga Savchuk	2; 6	1; 6
5	(Argentina) (Ukraine)	María Irigoyen / Paula Ormaechea; Mariya Koryttseva / Olga Savchuk	2; 6	0; 6

== See also ==
- Fed Cup structure
