= 2020 Billie Jean King Cup Europe/Africa Zone Group I – Pool A (Esch-sur-Alzette) =

Subsection of tennis competition

Pool A (Esch-sur-Alzette) of the 2020–21 Billie Jean King Cup Europe/Africa Zone Group I was one of four pools in the Europe/Africa zone of the 2020–21 Billie Jean King Cup. Three teams competed in a round robin competition, with the top teams and the bottom team proceeding to their respective sections of the play-offs: the top teams played for advancement to 2020 Billie Jean King Cup Play-offs.

== Standings ==
		SRB	SWE	LUX	RR; W–L	Set; W–L	Game; W–L	Standings
1	Serbia		2–1	2–1	4–2	8–5 (62%)	58–47 (55%)	1
6	Sweden	1–2		2–1	3–3	8–6 (57%)	60–49 (55%)	2
11	Luxembourg	1–2	1–2		2–4	4–9 (31%)	42–64 (40%)	3

Standings are determined by: 1. number of wins; 2. number of matches; 3. in two-team ties, head-to-head records; 4. in three-team ties, (a) percentage of matches won (head-to-head records if two teams remain tied), then (b) percentage of sets won (head-to-head records if two teams remain tied), then (c) percentage of games won (head-to-head records if two teams remain tied), then (d) Fed Cup rankings.

== Round-robin ==
=== Sweden vs. Luxembourg ===
Sweden
2
Centre National de Tennis, Esch-sur-Alzette, Luxembourg
5 February 2020
Hard (indoors)

Luxembourg
1

			1	2	3
1	(Sweden) (Luxembourg)	Mirjam Björklund; Tiffany Cornelius	6; 1	6; 3
2	(Sweden) (Luxembourg)	Johanna Larsson; Eléonora Molinaro	6; 0	3; 6	1; 6
3	(Sweden) (Luxembourg)	Johanna Larsson / Cornelia Lister; Tiffany Cornelius / Eléonora Molinaro	6; 4	6; 1

=== Serbia vs. Luxembourg ===
Serbia
2
Centre National de Tennis, Esch-sur-Alzette, Luxembourg
6 February 2020
Hard (indoors)

Luxembourg
1

			1	2	3
1	(Serbia) (Luxembourg)	Olga Danilović; Laura Correia	6; 1	6; 2
2	(Serbia) (Luxembourg)	Nina Stojanović; Eléonora Molinaro	3; 6	3; 6
3	(Serbia) (Luxembourg)	Aleksandra Krunić / Nina Stojanović; Tiffany Cornelius / Eléonora Molinaro	6; 4	6; 2

=== Serbia vs. Sweden ===
Serbia
2
Centre National de Tennis, Esch-sur-Alzette, Luxembourg
7 February 2020
Hard (indoors)

Sweden
1

			1	2	3
1	(Serbia) (Sweden)	Aleksandra Krunić; Mirjam Björklund	6; 2	3; 6	6; 3
2	(Serbia) (Sweden)	Nina Stojanović; Johanna Larsson	1; 6	0; 6
3	(Serbia) (Sweden)	Aleksandra Krunić / Nina Stojanović; Johanna Larsson / Cornelia Lister	6; 2	6; 1
