= 2013 Fed Cup World Group play-offs =

Part of tennis tournament

The World Group play-offs were four ties which involved the losing nations of the World Group first round and the winning nations of the World Group II. Nations that won their play-off ties entered the 2014 World Group, while losing nations joined the 2014 World Group II.

== Germany vs. Serbia ==
Germany
3
Porsche Arena, Stuttgart, Germany
20–21 April 2013
Clay (indoors)

Serbia
2

			1	2	3
1	(Germany) (Serbia)	Mona Barthel; Ana Ivanovic	6^{5} 7^{7}	6; 2	2; 6
2	(Germany) (Serbia)	Angelique Kerber; Bojana Jovanovski	7; 5	6; 2
3	(Germany) (Serbia)	Angelique Kerber; Ana Ivanovic	5; 7	5; 7
4	(Germany) (Serbia)	Mona Barthel; Bojana Jovanovski	6; 1	3; 6	6; 3
5	(Germany) (Serbia)	Anna-Lena Grönefeld / Sabine Lisicki; Vesna Dolonc / Aleksandra Krunić	6; 2	6; 4

== Switzerland vs. Australia ==
Switzerland
1
Tennis Club Chiasso, Chiasso, Switzerland
22 April 2013
Clay (outdoors)

Australia
3

			1	2	3
1	(Switzerland) (Australia)	Stefanie Vögele; Samantha Stosur	0; 6	4; 6
2	(Switzerland) (Australia)	Romina Oprandi; Jarmila Gajdošová	6; 2	6; 3
3	(Switzerland) (Australia)	Romina Oprandi; Samantha Stosur	5; 7	3; 6
4	(Switzerland) (Australia)	Stefanie Vögele; Ashleigh Barty	3; 6	4; 6
5	(Switzerland) (Australia)	Timea Bacsinszky / Amra Sadiković; Ashleigh Barty / Casey Dellacqua				not played

== Spain vs. Japan ==
Spain
4
Real Club de Polo, Barcelona, Spain
20–21 April 2013
Clay (outdoors)

Japan
0

			1	2	3
1	(Spain) (Japan)	Carla Suárez Navarro; Misaki Doi	6; 3	6; 4
2	(Spain) (Japan)	Silvia Soler Espinosa; Ayumi Morita	6; 2	6; 3
3	(Spain) (Japan)	Carla Suárez Navarro; Ayumi Morita	6; 3	7; 5
4	(Spain) (Japan)	Silvia Soler Espinosa; Misaki Doi				not played
5	(Spain) (Japan)	Lourdes Domínguez Lino / Anabel Medina Garrigues; Shuko Aoyama / Ayumi Morita	6; 4	7; 5

== United States vs. Sweden ==
United States
3
Delray Beach Tennis Center, Delray Beach, United States
20–21 April 2013
Hard (outdoors)

Sweden
2

			1	2	3
1	(United States) (Sweden)	Sloane Stephens; Sofia Arvidsson	4; 6	6; 4	1; 6
2	(United States) (Sweden)	Serena Williams; Johanna Larsson	6; 2	6; 2
3	(United States) (Sweden)	Serena Williams; Sofia Arvidsson	6; 2	6; 1
4	(United States) (Sweden)	Venus Williams; Johanna Larsson	6; 3	7; 5
5	(United States) (Sweden)	Varvara Lepchenko / Venus Williams; Hilda Melander / Sandra Roma				w/o
