= 2009 Fed Cup World Group II =

Part of tennis tournament

The World Group II was the second highest level of Fed Cup competition in 2009. Winning nations advanced to the World Group play-offs, and the losing nations were demoted to the World Group II play-offs.

== Slovakia vs. Belgium ==
Slovakia
4
Sibamac Arena, Bratislava, Slovakia
7–8 February 2009
Latex-ite hard (indoors)

Belgium
1

			1	2	3
1	(Slovakia) (Belgium)	Dominika Cibulková; Kirsten Flipkens	7^{7} 6^{4}	6; 1
2	(Slovakia) (Belgium)	Daniela Hantuchová; Yanina Wickmayer	7^{7} 6^{2}	6; 3
3	(Slovakia) (Belgium)	Dominika Cibulková; Yanina Wickmayer	6; 0	6; 3
4	(Slovakia) (Belgium)	Lenka Wienerová; Kirsten Flipkens	3; 6	6; 4	0; 6
5	(Slovakia) (Belgium)	Magdaléna Rybáriková / Lenka Wienerová; Tamaryn Hendler / Sofie Oyen	6; 4	6; 4

== Switzerland vs. Germany ==
Switzerland
2
Saalsporthalle, Zürich, Switzerland
7–8 February 2009
Rebound Ace (indoors)

Germany
3

			1	2	3
1	(Switzerland) (Germany)	Patty Schnyder; Anna-Lena Grönefeld	7^{7} 6^{0}	6; 3
2	(Switzerland) (Germany)	Timea Bacsinszky; Sabine Lisicki	0; 6	4; 6
3	(Switzerland) (Germany)	Patty Schnyder; Sabine Lisicki	6^{4} 7^{7}	7; 5	6; 1
4	(Switzerland) (Germany)	Timea Bacsinszky; Anna-Lena Grönefeld	3; 6	1; 6
5	(Switzerland) (Germany)	Patty Schnyder / Stefanie Vögele; Anna-Lena Grönefeld / Tatjana Malek	4; 6	3; 6

== Serbia vs. Japan ==
Serbia
4
Belgrade Arena, Belgrade, Serbia
7–8 February 2009
RuKortHard Tournament MF (indoors)

Japan
1

			1	2	3
1	(Serbia) (Japan)	Ana Ivanovic; Ai Sugiyama	6; 4	6; 4
2	(Serbia) (Japan)	Jelena Janković; Ayumi Morita	6; 1	6; 0
3	(Serbia) (Japan)	Jelena Janković; Ai Sugiyama	6; 3	6; 2
4	(Serbia) (Japan)	Ana Ivanovic; Ayumi Morita	6; 1	6; 2
5	(Serbia) (Japan)	Jelena Janković / Ana Jovanović; Rika Fujiwara / Aiko Nakamura	6; 3	5; 7		retired

== Ukraine vs. Israel ==
Ukraine
3
Palace of Sports, Kharkiv, Ukraine
7–8 February 2009
Latex-ite hard (indoors)

Israel
2

			1	2	3
1	(Ukraine) (Israel)	Alona Bondarenko; Tzipora Obziler	6; 4	6; 4
2	(Ukraine) (Israel)	Kateryna Bondarenko; Shahar Pe'er	3; 6	7^{8} 6^{6}	3; 6
3	(Ukraine) (Israel)	Alona Bondarenko; Shahar Pe'er	6; 4	5; 7	4; 6
4	(Ukraine) (Israel)	Kateryna Bondarenko; Tzipora Obziler	6; 1	4; 6	6; 0
5	(Ukraine) (Israel)	Alona Bondarenko / Kateryna Bondarenko; Tzipora Obziler / Shahar Pe'er	6; 3	6; 2

== See also ==
- Fed Cup structure
