= 2011 Fed Cup World Group play-offs =

Part of tennis tournament

The World Group play-offs were four ties which involved the losing nations of the World Group first round and the winning nations of the World Group II. Nations that won their play-off ties entered the 2012 World Group, while losing nations joined the 2012 World Group II.

== Germany vs. United States ==
Germany
5
Porsche Arena, Stuttgart, Germany
16–17 April 2011
Red clay (indoors)

United States
0

| | | | 1 | 2 | 3 |
|---|---|---|---|---|---|
| 1 | (Germany) (United States) | Andrea Petkovic; Christina McHale | 6; 3 | 6; 4 |
| 2 | (Germany) (United States) | Julia Görges; Melanie Oudin | 6; 2 | 7^{7} 6^{5} |
| 3 | (Germany) (United States) | Andrea Petkovic; Melanie Oudin | 6; 2 | 6; 3 |
| 4 | (Germany) (United States) | Sabine Lisicki; Christina McHale | 6; 3 | 6; 4 |
| 5 | (Germany) (United States) | Anna-Lena Grönefeld / Julia Görges; Liezel Huber / Vania King | 3; 6 | 6; 3 | 6; 1 |

== Spain vs. France ==
Spain
4
Club de Tenis Lleida, Lleida, Spain
16–17 April 2011
Clay (outdoors)

France
1

| | | | 1 | 2 | 3 |
|---|---|---|---|---|---|
| 1 | (Spain) (France) | María José Martínez Sánchez; Virginie Razzano | 6; 2 | 6; 4 |
| 2 | (Spain) (France) | Anabel Medina Garrigues; Aravane Rezaï | 5; 7 | 7^{7} 6^{4} | 2; 6 |
| 3 | (Spain) (France) | María José Martínez Sánchez; Aravane Rezaï | 6; 1 | 6; 4 |
| 4 | (Spain) (France) | Lourdes Domínguez Lino; Pauline Parmentier | 6; 4 | 6; 4 |
| 5 | (Spain) (France) | Anabel Medina Garrigues / Nuria Llagostera Vives; Alizé Cornet / Virginie Razzano | 6; 4 | 6; 1 |

== Slovakia vs. Serbia ==
Slovakia
2
Sibamac Arena, Bratislava, Slovakia
16–17 April 2011
Clay (indoors)

Serbia
3

| | | | 1 | 2 | 3 |
|---|---|---|---|---|---|---|
| 1 | (Slovakia) (Serbia) | Dominika Cibulková; Bojana Jovanovski | 4; 6 | 6; 3 | 6; 1 |
| 2 | (Slovakia) (Serbia) | Daniela Hantuchová; Ana Ivanovic | 2; 6 | 4; 6 |
| 3 | (Slovakia) (Serbia) | Dominika Cibulková; Ana Ivanovic | 6; 4 | 3; 3 | | retired |
| 4 | (Slovakia) (Serbia) | Daniela Hantuchová; Jelena Janković | 2; 6 | 6; 3 | 5; 7 |
| 5 | (Slovakia) (Serbia) | Daniela Hantuchová / Magdaléna Rybáriková; Jelena Janković / Aleksandra Krunić | 6; 2 | 5; 7 | 7; 9 |

== Australia vs. Ukraine ==
Australia
2
Glen Iris Valley Recreational Club, Melbourne, Australia
16–17 April 2011
Red clay (outdoors)

Ukraine
3

| | | | 1 | 2 | 3 |
|---|---|---|---|---|---|
| 1 | (Australia) (Ukraine) | Jarmila Groth; Olga Savchuk | 6; 1 | 6; 1 |
| 2 | (Australia) (Ukraine) | Anastasia Rodionova; Lesia Tsurenko | 1; 6 | 4; 6 |
| 3 | (Australia) (Ukraine) | Jarmila Groth; Lesia Tsurenko | 6; 1 | 6; 3 |
| 4 | (Australia) (Ukraine) | Anastasia Rodionova; Olga Savchuk | 6^{3} 7^{7} | 6^{12} 7^{14} |
| 5 | (Australia) (Ukraine) | Jarmila Groth / Anastasia Rodionova; Olga Savchuk / Lesia Tsurenko | 6; 0 | 6^{3} 7^{7} | 3; 6 |

== See also ==
- Fed Cup structure
