= 2010 Fed Cup World Group play-offs =

Part of tennis tournament

The World Group play-offs were four ties which involved the losing nations of the World Group first round and the winning nations of the World Group II. Nations that won their play-off ties entered the 2011 World Group, while losing nations joined the 2011 World Group II.

== Belgium vs. Estonia ==
Belgium
3
Grenslandhallen, Hasselt, Belgium
24–25 April 2010
Red clay (indoors)

Estonia
2

			1	2	3
1	(Belgium) (Estonia)	Kim Clijsters; Maret Ani	6; 4	6; 2
2	(Belgium) (Estonia)	Yanina Wickmayer; Kaia Kanepi	6; 2	4; 6	6; 1
3	(Belgium) (Estonia)	Justine Henin; Kaia Kanepi	7^{8} 6^{6}	4; 6	3; 6
4	(Belgium) (Estonia)	Yanina Wickmayer; Maret Ani	2; 6	6; 1	6; 1
5	(Belgium) (Estonia)	Kirsten Flipkens / Yanina Wickmayer; Maret Ani / Margit Rüütel	6; 2	4; 6	3; 6

== Ukraine vs. Australia ==
Ukraine
0
Palace of Sports "Lokomotiv", Kharkiv, Ukraine
24–25 April 2010
Red clay (indoors)

Australia
5

			1	2	3
1	(Ukraine) (Australia)	Alona Bondarenko; Anastasia Rodionova	6; 0	3; 6	5; 7
2	(Ukraine) (Australia)	Mariya Koryttseva; Samantha Stosur	3; 6	0; 6
3	(Ukraine) (Australia)	Lyudmyla Kichenok; Samantha Stosur	6^{4} 7^{7}	3; 6
4	(Ukraine) (Australia)	Mariya Koryttseva; Alicia Molik	6; 2	2; 6	5; 7
5	(Ukraine) (Australia)	Lyudmyla Kichenok / Nadiya Kichenok; Rennae Stubbs / Anastasia Rodionova	2; 6	7^{7} 6^{2}	1; 6

== Germany vs. France ==
Germany
2
Frankfurter TC 1914 Palmengarten, Frankfurt, Germany
24–25 April 2010
Red clay (outdoors)

France
3

			1	2	3
1	(Germany) (France)	Andrea Petkovic; Pauline Parmentier	6; 3	6; 2
2	(Germany) (France)	Tatjana Malek; Aravane Rezaï	6; 2	3; 6	0; 6
3	(Germany) (France)	Andrea Petkovic; Aravane Rezaï	6; 1	7^{7} 6^{2}
4	(Germany) (France)	Julia Görges; Pauline Parmentier	6^{4} 7^{7}	4; 6
5	(Germany) (France)	Kristina Barrois / Andrea Petkovic; Julie Coin / Alizé Cornet	3; 6	1; 6

== Serbia vs. Slovakia ==
Serbia
2
Belgrade Arena, Belgrade, Serbia
24–25 April 2010
Red clay (indoors)

Slovakia
3

			1	2	3
1	(Serbia) (Slovakia)	Jelena Janković; Magdaléna Rybáriková	7^{7} 6^{5}	6; 3
2	(Serbia) (Slovakia)	Bojana Jovanovski; Daniela Hantuchová	2; 6	2; 6
3	(Serbia) (Slovakia)	Jelena Janković; Daniela Hantuchová	6^{2} 7^{7}	5; 7
4	(Serbia) (Slovakia)	Bojana Jovanovski; Magdaléna Rybáriková	6; 1	7^{7} 6^{4}
5	(Serbia) (Slovakia)	Jelena Janković / Bojana Jovanovski; Daniela Hantuchová / Magdaléna Rybáriková	4; 6	3; 6

Note: Ana Ivanovic decided to withdraw from this tie in March due to her ongoing poor form.

== See also ==
- Fed Cup structure
