= 2011 Fed Cup World Group II =

Part of tennis tournament

The World Group II was the second highest level of Fed Cup competition in 2011. Winning nations advanced to the World Group I play-offs, and losing nations were demoted to the World Group II play-offs.

== Estonia vs. Spain ==
=== Estonian team ===
- Kaia Kanepi (WTA Singles #17, WTA Doubles #184)
- Anett Kontaveit (WTA Singles -, WTA Doubles -)
- Maret Ani (WTA Singles #527, WTA Doubles #241)
- Margit Rüütel (WTA Singles #442, WTA Doubles #1174)

=== Spanish team ===
- María José Martínez Sánchez (WTA Singles #28, WTA Doubles #12)
- Carla Suárez Navarro (WTA Singles Singles #66, WTA Doubles -)
- Anabel Medina Garrigues (WTA Singles #81, WTA Doubles #23)
- Nuria Llagostera Vives (WTA Singles #128, WTA Doubles #19)

Estonia
1
Tere Tennis Club, Tallinn, Estonia
5–6 February 2011
Plexipave (indoors)

Spain
4

| | | | 1 | 2 | 3 |
|---|---|---|---|---|---|
| 1 | (Estonia) (Spain) | Anett Kontaveit; María José Martínez Sánchez | 2; 6 | 0 |
| 2 | (Estonia) (Spain) | Kaia Kanepi; Carla Suárez Navarro | 6; 3 | 6; 2 |
| 3 | (Estonia) (Spain) | Kaia Kanepi; María José Martínez Sánchez | 6; 3 | 4; 6 | 3; 6 |
| 4 | (Estonia) (Spain) | Anett Kontaveit; Carla Suárez Navarro | 2; 6 | 2; 6 |
| 5 | (Estonia) (Spain) | Maret Ani / Margit Rüütel; Nuria Llagostera Vives / Anabel Medina Garrigues | 1; 6 | 6^{5} 7^{7} |

== Slovenia vs. Germany ==
Slovenia
1
Ljudski vrt Sports Hall, Maribor, Slovenia
5–6 February 2011
Red clay (indoors)

Germany
4

| | | | 1 | 2 | 3 |
|---|---|---|---|---|---|---|
| 1 | (Slovenia) (Germany) | Maša Zec Peškirič; Andrea Petkovic | 3; 6 | 4; 6 |
| 2 | (Slovenia) (Germany) | Polona Hercog; Julia Görges | 7; 5 | 6; 4 |
| 3 | (Slovenia) (Germany) | Polona Hercog; Andrea Petkovic | 1; 6 | 2; 6 |
| 4 | (Slovenia) (Germany) | Maša Zec Peškirič; Julia Görges | 4; 6 | 2; 6 |
| 5 | (Slovenia) (Germany) | Polona Hercog / Katarina Srebotnik; Anna-Lena Grönefeld / Tatjana Malek | 6^{3} 7^{7} | | | retired |

== Serbia vs. Canada ==
Serbia
3
Spens Sports Center, Novi Sad, Serbia
5–6 February 2011
RuKortHard Tournament MF (indoors)

Canada
2

| | | | 1 | 2 | 3 |
|---|---|---|---|---|---|
| 1 | (Serbia) (Canada) | Aleksandra Krunić; Rebecca Marino | 3; 6 | 6; 3 | 5; 7 |
| 2 | (Serbia) (Canada) | Bojana Jovanovski; Aleksandra Wozniak | 6; 4 | 7; 5 |
| 3 | (Serbia) (Canada) | Bojana Jovanovski; Rebecca Marino | 7^{7} 6^{3} | 6; 3 |
| 4 | (Serbia) (Canada) | Ana Jovanović; Aleksandra Wozniak | 0; 6 | 4; 6 |
| 5 | (Serbia) (Canada) | Bojana Jovanovski / Aleksandra Krunić; Sharon Fichman / Marie-Ève Pelletier | 7^{7} 6^{5} | 6; 4 |

== Sweden vs. Ukraine ==
Sweden
2
Idrottens Hus, Helsingborg, Sweden
5–6 February 2011
Latex-ite hard (indoors)

Ukraine
3

| | | | 1 | 2 | 3 |
|---|---|---|---|---|---|
| 1 | (Sweden) (Ukraine) | Sofia Arvidsson; Lesia Tsurenko | 6; 3 | 6; 2 |
| 2 | (Sweden) (Ukraine) | Johanna Larsson; Kateryna Bondarenko | 6^{2} 7^{7} | 6^{5} 7^{7} |
| 3 | (Sweden) (Ukraine) | Sofia Arvidsson; Kateryna Bondarenko | 6^{3} 7^{7} | 4; 6 |
| 4 | (Sweden) (Ukraine) | Johanna Larsson; Lesia Tsurenko | 6^{3} 7^{7} | 6; 2 | 6; 3 |
| 5 | (Sweden) (Ukraine) | Sofia Arvidsson / Johanna Larsson; Kateryna Bondarenko / Olga Savchuk | 5; 7 | 3; 6 |

== See also ==
- Fed Cup structure
