= Tennis Federation of Serbia =

- Sport: Tennis
- Jurisdiction: National
- Abbreviation: TSS
- Founded: August 27, 1922; 103 years ago
- Affiliation: International Tennis Federation (ITF)
- Regional affiliation: Tennis Europe
- Headquarters: Bulevar despota Stefana 62–64, Palilula, Belgrade
- Location: Belgrade, Serbia
- President: Goran Đoković
- Secretary: Dušan Orlandić
- Men's coach: Viktor Troicki (Davis Cup)
- Women's coach: Dušan Vemić (Billie Jean King Cup)

Official website
- www.teniskisavez.com
- (Serbia)

The Tennis Federation of Serbia (Serbian: Тениски савез Србије / Teniski savez Srbije) is the governing body of tennis in Serbia.

== History ==
Following the end of the First World War, tennis gained significant popularity in what is now Serbia. This surge in interest led to the formation of a central governing body intended to unify all clubs and sections, as well as to organize tournaments and competitions throughout the Kingdom of Yugoslavia.

The founding assembly was held on August 27, 1922, at the Zlatna Kruna tavern in Zagreb. Zagreb was chosen as the headquarters of the then newly established Yugoslav Tennis Association, as it was considered the premier tennis center in the Kingdom of Yugoslavia. Eight clubs attended the assembly. The association was tasked with ensuring the proper application of tennis rules in national competitions, cooperating with foreign associations, forming a national team, and deciding on all key matters related to this sport. Hinko Würth served as the association's first president.

After a series of political changes and conflicts, the association's headquarters were relocated to Belgrade.

In 2013, the Tennis Federation of Serbia published a monograph titled Tenis bez granica, marking the federation's 90th anniversary. Spanning over 900 pages, it provides an extensive account of the history of tennis in the Balkans.

== Governance ==
The Tennis Federation of Serbia is the primary organization for tennis recognized by the Olympic Committee of Serbia. In a 2020 governance assessment, the federation was part of a group of Serbian sports bodies that received a "moderate" score of 59% on the National Sports Governance Observer index.

== List of presidents ==
Throughout its history, the Tennis Federation of Serbia has been led by 24 different presidents.

- Hinko Würth (1922–1934)
- Stefan Hadži (1934–1937)
- Drago Čop (1937–1941)
- Mišo Pavićević (1948–1953)
- Dušan Korać (1954–1958)
- Mirko Mastilović (1959–1963)
- Miladin Šakić (1964–1966)
- Dušan Korać (1967–1977)
- Stjepan Tončić (1978–1982)
- Radmilo Nikolić (1982)
- Ernest Nađ (1983)
- Blagoje Andrejevski (1984)
- Tomislav Poljak (1985)
- Anton Tonejc (1986)
- Božidar Martinović (1987)
- Ferdinand Trupej (1988)
- Petar Marinković (1989–1991)
- Radmilo Nikolić (1992–1993)
- Rodoljub Radulović (1994–1996)
- Radoman Božović (1996–2000)
- Predrag Mitrović (2000–2004)
- Boško Ivanović (2004–2006)
- Slobodan Živojinović (2006–2011)
- Vuk Jeremić (2011–2015)
- Mirko Petrović (2015–2024)
- Goran Đoković (2024–present)

== See also ==
- Serbia Davis Cup team
- Serbia Billie Jean King Cup team
- Serbia at the Hopman Cup
