= 2012 Fed Cup World Group =

- Date: 4 February – 4 November
- Edition: 22nd

Champions
- Czech Republic
- Fed Cup

The World Group was the highest level of Fed Cup competition in 2012. Eight nations competed in a three-round knockout competition. Czech Republic was the defending champion, and they successfully defended their title by defeating first-time finalists Serbia in the final.

== Participating teams ==
Participating Teams
Belgium	Czech Republic	Germany	Italy
Russia	Serbia	Spain	Ukraine

== Draw ==
Quarterfinals; 4–5 February
Moscow, Russia (Indoor hard)
1	Russia	3
Spain	2
Charleroi, Belgium (Indoor hard)
Serbia	3
4	Belgium	2
Biella, Italy (Indoor clay)
3	Italy	3
Ukraine	2
Stuttgart, Germany (Indoor hard)
Germany	1
2	Czech Republic	4

Semifinals; 21–22 April
Moscow, Russia (Indoor clay)
1	Russia	2
Serbia	3
Ostrava, Czech Republic (Indoor hard)
3	Italy	1
2	Czech Republic	4

Final; 3–4 November
Prague, Czech Republic (Indoor hard)
Serbia	1
2	Czech Republic	3

== First round ==
=== Russia vs. Spain ===
Russia
3
Olympic Stadium, Moscow, Russia
4–5 February 2012
RuKortHard (indoors)

Spain
2

			1	2	3
1	(Russia) (Spain)	Maria Sharapova; Silvia Soler-Espinosa	6; 2	6; 1
2	(Russia) (Spain)	Svetlana Kuznetsova; Carla Suárez Navarro	6; 3	6; 1
3	(Russia) (Spain)	Nadia Petrova; Carla Suárez Navarro	0; 6	3; 6
4	(Russia) (Spain)	Svetlana Kuznetsova; Silvia Soler-Espinosa	6; 2	4; 6	6; 3
5	(Russia) (Spain)	Nadia Petrova / Svetlana Kuznetsova; Nuria Llagostera Vives / Arantxa Parra Santonja	3; 6			retired

=== Serbia vs. Belgium ===
Serbia
3
Spiroudome, Charleroi, Belgium
4–5 February 2012
Decoturf II (indoors)

Belgium
2

			1	2	3
1	(Serbia) (Belgium)	Jelena Janković; Kirsten Flipkens	7; 5	7; 5
2	(Serbia) (Belgium)	Bojana Jovanovski; Yanina Wickmayer	4; 6	4; 6
3	(Serbia) (Belgium)	Aleksandra Krunić; Yanina Wickmayer	1; 6	0; 6
4	(Serbia) (Belgium)	Bojana Jovanovski; Kirsten Flipkens	6; 2	6; 4
5	(Serbia) (Belgium)	Aleksandra Krunić / Bojana Jovanovski; Alison Van Uytvanck / Yanina Wickmayer	7^{7} 6^{2}	4; 6	6; 1

=== Italy vs. Ukraine ===
Italy
3
Lauretana Forum, Biella, Italy
4–5 February 2012
Red clay (indoors)

Ukraine
2

			1	2	3
1	(Italy) (Ukraine)	Sara Errani; Kateryna Bondarenko	6; 2	6; 3
2	(Italy) (Ukraine)	Francesca Schiavone; Lesia Tsurenko	1; 6	2; 6
3	(Italy) (Ukraine)	Francesca Schiavone; Kateryna Bondarenko	6^{6} 7^{8}	7; 5	6; 4
4	(Italy) (Ukraine)	Sara Errani; Lesia Tsurenko	1; 6	0; 3		retired
5	(Italy) (Ukraine)	Flavia Pennetta / Roberta Vinci; Lesia Tsurenko / Olga Savchuk	7; 5	0; 6	6; 1

=== Germany vs. Czech Republic ===
Germany
1
Porsche Arena, Stuttgart, Germany
4–5 February 2012
DecoColor hard (indoors)

Czech Republic
4

			1	2	3
1	(Germany) (Czech Republic)	Sabine Lisicki; Iveta Benešová	6; 2	4; 6	2; 6
2	(Germany) (Czech Republic)	Julia Görges; Petra Kvitová	6; 3	3; 6	8; 10
3	(Germany) (Czech Republic)	Sabine Lisicki; Petra Kvitová	7^{7} 6^{2}	4; 6	1; 6
4	(Germany) (Czech Republic)	Angelique Kerber; Lucie Hradecká	6; 4	6; 4
5	(Germany) (Czech Republic)	Anna-Lena Grönefeld / Julia Görges; Iveta Benešová / Barbora Záhlavová-Strýcová	3; 6	6^{4} 7^{7}

== Semifinals ==
=== Russia vs. Serbia ===
Russia
2
Megasport Arena, Moscow, Russia
21–22 April 2012
Red clay (indoors)

Serbia
3

			1	2	3
1	(Russia) (Serbia)	Anastasia Pavlyuchenkova; Jelena Janković	4; 6	3; 6
2	(Russia) (Serbia)	Svetlana Kuznetsova; Ana Ivanovic	6; 2	2; 6	6; 4
3	(Russia) (Serbia)	Anastasia Pavlyuchenkova; Ana Ivanovic	6; 3	0; 6	3; 6
4	(Russia) (Serbia)	Svetlana Kuznetsova; Jelena Janković	1; 6	4; 6
5	(Russia) (Serbia)	Anastasia Pavlyuchenkova / Elena Vesnina; Aleksandra Krunić / Bojana Jovanovski	6; 4	6; 0

=== Italy vs. Czech Republic ===
Italy
1
ČEZ Aréna, Ostrava, Czech Republic
21–22 April 2012
Novacrylic ultracushion hard (indoors)

Czech Republic
4

			1	2	3
1	(Italy) (Czech Republic)	Francesca Schiavone; Lucie Šafářová	6^{3} 7^{7}	1; 6
2	(Italy) (Czech Republic)	Sara Errani; Petra Kvitová	4; 6	3; 6
3	(Italy) (Czech Republic)	Francesca Schiavone; Petra Kvitová	4; 6	6^{1} 7^{7}
4	(Italy) (Czech Republic)	Sara Errani; Andrea Hlaváčková	2; 6	6; 2	6; 2
5	(Italy) (Czech Republic)	Sara Errani / Flavia Pennetta; Andrea Hlaváčková / Lucie Hradecká	6; 5			retired

== Final ==
=== Serbia vs. Czech Republic ===
Serbia
1
O2 Arena, Prague, Czech Republic
3–4 November 2012
Novacrylic ultracushion hard (indoors)

Czech Republic
3

			1	2	3
1	(Serbia) (Czech Republic)	Ana Ivanovic; Lucie Šafářová	4; 6	3; 6
2	(Serbia) (Czech Republic)	Jelena Janković; Petra Kvitová	4; 6	1; 6
3	(Serbia) (Czech Republic)	Ana Ivanovic; Petra Kvitová	6; 3	7; 5
4	(Serbia) (Czech Republic)	Jelena Janković; Lucie Šafářová	1; 6	1; 6
5	(Serbia) (Czech Republic)	Bojana Jovanovski / Aleksandra Krunić; Andrea Hlaváčková / Lucie Hradecká				not played

2012 Fed Cup champions

Czech Republic
Seventh title

== See also ==
- Fed Cup structure
