= Serbia Billie Jean King Cup team =

Serbian women's tennis team

Serbia
- Association: Tennis Federation of Serbia
- Captain: Dušan Vemić
- Nations Ranking: 34 (17 November 2025)
- Highest ranking: 4 (23 April 2012)
- Colors: Red & White
- First year: 1969
- Years played: 50
- Ties played (W–L): 169 (94–75)
- Years in World Group: 7 (4–5)
- Runners-up: 1 (2012)
- Most total wins: Jelena Janković (34–16)
- Most singles wins: Jelena Janković (27–11)
- Most doubles wins: Dragana Zarić (15–11); Sabrina Goleš (15–5)
- Best doubles team: Katarina Mišić / Dragana Zarić (6–0); Sabrina Goleš / Renata Šašak (6–3)
- Most ties played: Dragana Zarić (37)
- Most years played: Jelena Janković (12); Aleksandra Krunić (12)
- Last updated on: 11 April 2026.

The Serbian Billie Jean King Cup team represents Serbia in the Billie Jean King Cup tennis competition and is governed by the Tennis Federation of Serbia.

As the legal successor to previous national teams, Serbia has inherited all results from the former Yugoslavia and Serbia and Montenegro teams. Since June 2006, following the dissolution of Serbia and Montenegro, the team has competed under the name Serbia.

In 2012, the team reached its first Fed Cup final, achieving victories over the Belgium and Russia teams in away ties, before ultimately losing to the Czech Republic in Prague. That same year, the Olympic Committee of Serbia honored the Fed Cup team as the best women's team of 2012.

== Current team ==
The following players were called up for the 2026 Billie Jean King Cup Europe/Africa Zone ties.

Player	Singles Rank	Doubles Rank	First year played	No. of ties	Total Win/Loss	Singles Win/Loss	Doubles Win/Loss
Lola Radivojević	145	1330	2022	20	10–14	8–10	2–4
Teodora Kostović	161	1378	2025	6	4–3	4–2	0–1
Mia Ristić	264	—	2023	17	10–9	10–6	0–3
Natalija Senić	366	317	2024	6	3–5	2–0	1–5
Aleksandra Krunić	730	8	2011	32	29–17	15–8	14–9

WTA rankings on 6 April 2026

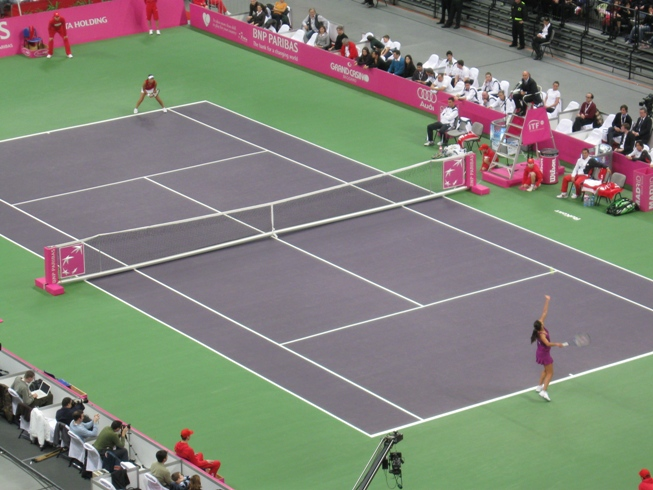
Ana Ivanovic of Serbia competing against Ai Sugiyama of the Japan team in Belgrade on 7 February during the 2009 season.

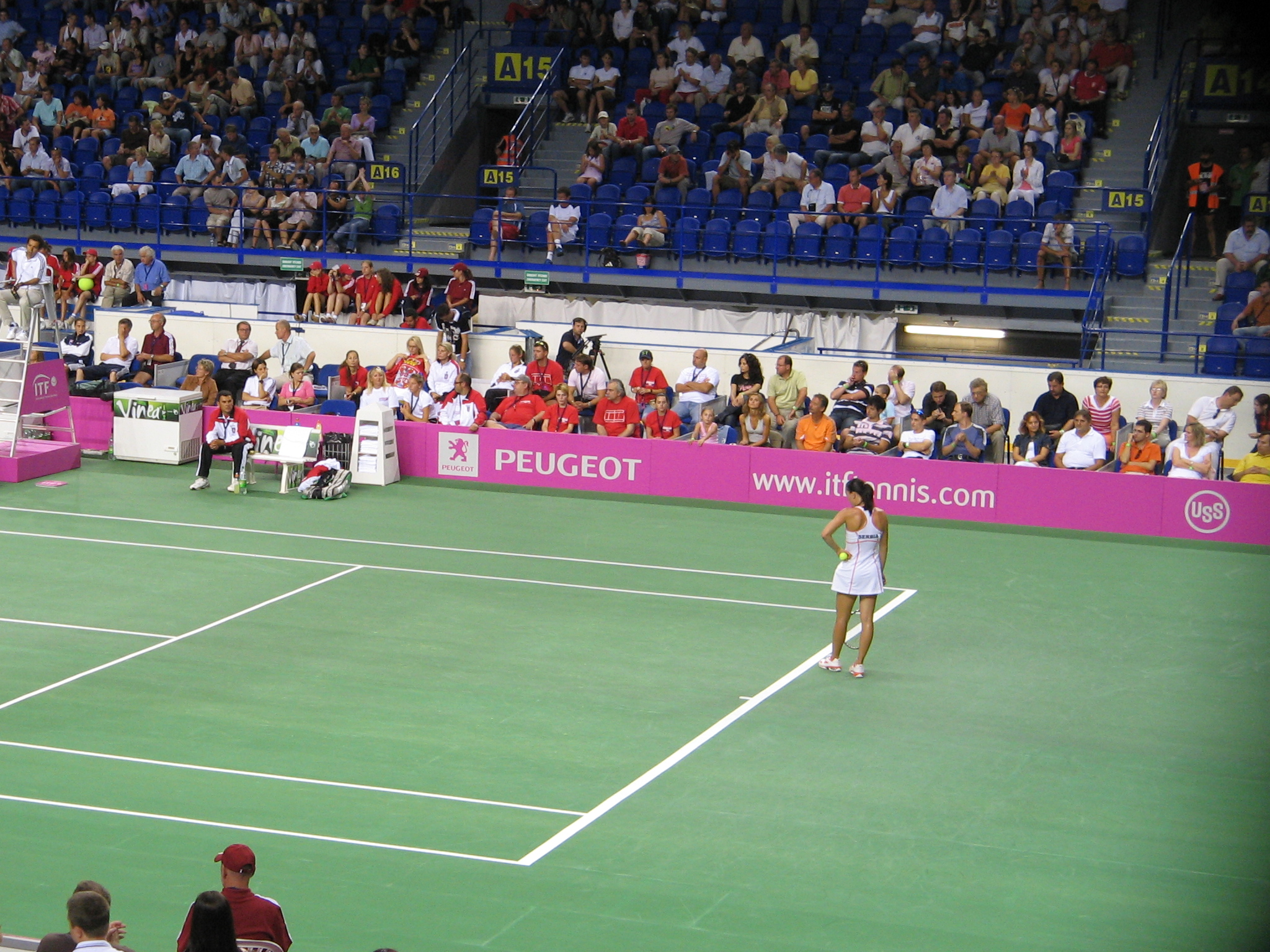
Jelena Janković, team record holder with the most total wins (34–16) and singles match wins (27–11) for Serbia, playing against Slovakia in Košice on 14 July during the 2007 season.

=== Recent call-ups ===
The following players have competed in at least one tie in the past three years.

Player	Singles Rank	Doubles Rank	First year played	No. of ties	Total Win/Loss	Singles Win/Loss	Doubles Win/Loss	Last year played
Anja Stanković	512	313	2024	3	0–3	0–0	0–3	2025
Luna Vujović	824	1254	2025	1	0–1	0–0	0–1	2025
Nina Stojanović	405	727	2014	15	11–12	2–8	9–4	2024
Elena Milovanović	633	383	2022	4	1–4	0–1	1–3	2024
Olga Danilović	110	87	2018	14	12–8	7–3	5–5	2023
Natalija Stevanović	—	—	2022	1	0–1	0–1	0–0	2023
Katarina Kozarov	—	—	2022	8	3–5	0–0	3–5	2023

WTA rankings on 6 April 2026

== History ==
=== Before 1992 ===
Serbia, together with other former Yugoslavian countries, competed in its first Fed Cup in 1969, as Yugoslavian Fed Cup team until 1992. Yugoslavia reached the semifinals in 1984, with 1977 French Open champion, Mima Jaušovec and Sabrina Goleš in the team.

=== From 1995 ===
Together with, what is now Montenegro Fed Cup team, Serbia competed under name of Yugoslavia from 1995 until 2003; and from 2004–2006 under name of Serbia and Montenegro. After Montenegro declared its independence, Serbia is competing under its present name since 2007.

The biggest success from 1995 is when Serbia Fed Cup team reached the final in 2012 Fed Cup World Group, where they lost to Czech Republic in away tie.

Year	Name of the country	Years played	Ties played	Years in World Group	Best result
1969–1992	Socialist Federal Republic of Yugoslavia (SFRJ)	19	53 (24–29)	–	Main Draw Semifinals 1984
1995–2003	Federal Republic of Yugoslavia (SRJ)	9	34 (20–14)	0	Europe/Africa Zone, Group I Play–offs 2002, 2003
2004–2006	Serbia and Montenegro (SCG)	3	11 (7–4)	0	Europe/Africa Zone, Group I Play–offs 2004, 2006
2007–	Serbia (SRB)	19	71 (43–28)	7 (4–5)	Final 2012
1969–	Overall	50	169 (94–75)	7 (4–5)	Final 2012

Serbia considers as the direct successor of Fed Cup team Serbia and Montenegro, FR Yugoslavia and SFR Yugoslavia.

== Results ==
Tournament	1963	1964	1965	1966	1967	1968	1969	1970	1971	1972	1973	1974	1975	1976	1977	1978	1979	1980	1981	1982	1983	1984	1985	1986	1987	1988	1989	1990	1991	1992	1993	1994	W–L
Federation Cup
World Group	A	A	A	A	A	A	2R	2R	QF	A	1R	1R	1R	2R	A	2R	2R	2R	1R	1R	QF	SF	2R	2R	2R	1R	1R	Q1	1R	A	Susp.		22–27
Europe/Africa Zone	Not Held																													QF	Susp.		2–2
Win–loss	–	–	–	–	–	–	0–1	0–2	0–0	–	0–2	0–0	0–2	1–1	–	1–1	1–1	1–1	2–2	0–0	2–1	3–1	1–1	2–1	1–1	1–2	4–2	2–2	0–3	2–2	–	–	24–29

Tournament	1995	1996	1997	1998	1999	2000	2001	2002	2003	2004	2005	2006	2007	2008	2009	2010	2011	2012	2013	2014	2015	2016	2017	2018	W–L
Fed Cup
World Group	A	A	A	A	A	A	A	A	A	A	A	A	A	A	A	QF	A	F	QF	A	A	A	A	A	2–3
World Group play-offs	A	A	A	A	A	NH	A	A	A	A	A	A	A	A	W	L	W	A	L	A	A	A	A	A	2–2
World Group II	A	A	A	A	A	Not Held					A	A	A	A	W	A	W	A	A	L	A	L	A	A	2–2
World Group II play-offs	A	A	A	A	A	Not Held					A	A	L	W	A	A	A	A	A	L	W	L	L	A	2–4
Europe/Africa Zone Group I	A	13–16	A	9–12	13–16	A	5–8	PO	PO	PO	7–8	PO	W	W	A	A	A	A	A	A	W	A	W	PO	29–19
Europe/Africa Zone Group II	W	A	W	A	A	W	A	A	A	A	A	A	A	A	A	A	A	A	A	A	A	A	A	A	13–1
Win–loss	4–1	0–3	5–0	1–2	0–3	4–0	2–1	2–2	2–2	2–1	2–2	3–1	3–2	4–0	2–0	0–2	2–0	2–1	0–2	0–2	4–0	0–2	4–1	2–1	74–60
Year End Ranking								32	32	28	31	24	19	14	7	11	7	4	4	6	10	24	17	21	

== Results under present name Serbia ==
=== 2000s ===
Year	Competition	Date	Surface	Location	Opponent	Score	Result
2007	Europe/Africa Zone Group I Pool C	18 Apr	clay	Plovdiv, Bulgaria	Estonia	3 : 0	Won
2007	Europe/Africa Zone Group I Pool C	19 Apr	clay	Plovdiv, Bulgaria	Sweden	1 : 2	Lost
2007	Europe/Africa Zone Group I Pool C	20 Apr	clay	Plovdiv, Bulgaria	Slovenia	2 : 1	Won
2007	Europe/Africa Zone Group I play-offs	21 Apr	clay	Plovdiv, Bulgaria	Romania	2 : 1	Won
2007	World Group II play-offs	14–15 Jul	hard (i)	Košice, Slovakia	Slovakia	1 : 4	Lost
2008	Europe/Africa Zone Group I Pool D	31 Jan	carpet (i)	Budapest, Hungary	Poland	2 : 1	Won
2008	Europe/Africa Zone Group I Pool D	1 Feb	carpet (i)	Budapest, Hungary	Romania	2 : 1	Won
2008	Europe/Africa Zone Group I play-offs	2 Feb	carpet (i)	Budapest, Hungary	Netherlands	2 : 0	Won
2008	World Group II play-offs	26–27 Apr	hard (i)	Zagreb, Croatia	Croatia	3 : 2	Won
2009	World Group II	7–8 Feb	hard (i)	Belgrade, Serbia	Japan	4 : 1	Won
2009	World Group play-offs	25–26 Apr	clay	Lleida, Spain	Spain	4 : 0	Won

=== 2010s ===
Year	Competition	Date	Surface	Location	Opponent	Score	Result
2010	World Group 1st Round	6–7 Feb	hard (i)	Belgrade, Serbia	Russia	2 : 3	Lost
2010	World Group play-offs	24–25 Apr	clay (i)	Belgrade, Serbia	Slovakia	2 : 3	Lost
2011	World Group II	5–6 Feb	hard (i)	Novi Sad, Serbia	Canada	3 : 2	Won
2011	World Group play-offs	16–17 Apr	clay (i)	Bratislava, Slovakia	Slovakia	3 : 2	Won
2012	World Group 1st Round	4–5 Feb	hard (i)	Charleroi, Belgium	Belgium	3 : 2	Won
2012	World Group Semifinals	21–22 Apr	clay (i)	Moscow, Russia	Russia	3 : 2	Won
2012	World Group Final	3–4 Nov	hard (i)	Prague, Czech Republic	Czech Republic	1 : 3	Runner-up
2013	World Group 1st Round	9–10 Feb	hard (i)	Niš, Serbia	Slovakia	2 : 3	Lost
2013	World Group play-offs	20–21 Apr	clay	Stuttgart, Germany	Germany	2 : 3	Lost
2014	World Group II	8–9 Feb	hard (i)	Montreal, Canada	Canada	1 : 4	Lost
2014	World Group II play-offs	19–20 Apr	clay	Bucharest, Romania	Romania	1 : 4	Lost
2015	Europe/Africa Zone Group I Pool A	4 Feb	hard (i)	Budapest, Hungary	Austria	3 : 0	Won
2015	Europe/Africa Zone Group I Pool A	5 Feb	hard (i)	Budapest, Hungary	Hungary	2 : 1	Won
2015	Europe/Africa Zone Group I play-offs	7 Feb	hard (i)	Budapest, Hungary	Croatia	2 : 0	Won
2015	World Group II play-offs	18–19 Apr	hard	Novi Sad, Serbia	Paraguay	4 : 1	Won
2016	World Group II	6–7 Feb	hard (i)	Kraljevo, Serbia	Spain	0 : 4	Lost
2016	World Group II play-offs	16–17 Apr	clay (i)	Belgrade, Serbia	Belgium	2 : 3	Lost
2017	Europe/Africa Zone Group I Pool D	8 Feb	hard (i)	Tallinn, Estonia	Estonia	2 : 1	Won
2017	Europe/Africa Zone Group I Pool D	9 Feb	hard (i)	Tallinn, Estonia	Bulgaria	2 : 1	Won
2017	Europe/Africa Zone Group I Pool D	10 Feb	hard (i)	Tallinn, Estonia	Israel	2 : 1	Won
2017	Europe/Africa Zone Group I play-offs	11 Feb	hard (i)	Tallinn, Estonia	Poland	2 : 1	Won
2017	World Group II play-offs	22–23 Apr	hard (i)	Zrenjanin, Serbia	Australia	0 : 4	Lost
2018	Europe/Africa Zone Group I Pool A	7 Feb	hard (i)	Tallinn, Estonia	Bulgaria	2 : 1	Won
2018	Europe/Africa Zone Group I Pool A	9 Feb	hard (i)	Tallinn, Estonia	Georgia	2 : 1	Won
2018	Europe/Africa Zone Group I play-offs	10 Feb	hard (i)	Tallinn, Estonia	Latvia	1 : 2	Lost
2019	Europe/Africa Zone Group I Pool A	6 Feb	hard (i)	Bath, United Kingdom	Georgia	2 : 1	Won
2019	Europe/Africa Zone Group I Pool A	7 Feb	hard (i)	Bath, United Kingdom	Turkey	3 : 0	Won
2019	Europe/Africa Zone Group I Pool A	8 Feb	hard (i)	Bath, United Kingdom	Croatia	2 : 1	Won
2019	Europe/Africa Zone Play-offs	9 Feb	hard (i)	Bath, United Kingdom	Great Britain	0 : 2	Lost

=== 2020s ===
Year	Competition	Date	Surface	Location	Opponent	Score	Result
2020–21	Europe/Africa Zone Group I Pool A	6 Feb	hard (i)	Esch-sur-Alzette, Luxembourg	Luxembourg	2 : 1	Won
2020–21	Europe/Africa Zone Group I Pool A	7 Feb	hard (i)	Esch-sur-Alzette, Luxembourg	Sweden	2 : 1	Won
2020–21	Europe/Africa Zone Promotion Play-off	8 Feb	hard (i)	Esch-sur-Alzette, Luxembourg	Slovenia	2 : 1	Won
2020–21	World Play-offs	16–17 Apr	hard (i)	Kraljevo, Serbia	Canada	0 : 4	Lost
2022	Europe/Africa Zone Group I Pool A	11 Apr	clay	Antalya, Turkey	Estonia	2 : 1	Won
2022	Europe/Africa Zone Group I Pool A	12 Apr	clay	Antalya, Turkey	Denmark	2 : 1	Won
2022	Europe/Africa Zone Group I Pool A	14 Apr	clay	Antalya, Turkey	Hungary	1 : 2	Lost
2022	Europe/Africa Zone Group I Pool A	15 Apr	clay	Antalya, Turkey	Turkey	2 : 1	Won
2022	Europe/Africa Zone Promotion Play-off	16 Apr	clay	Antalya, Turkey	Croatia	0 : 2	Lost
2022	World Play-offs	11–12 Nov	clay	San Luis Potosí, Mexico	Mexico	0 : 4	Lost
2023	Europe/Africa Zone Group I Pool A	10 Apr	clay	Antalya, Turkey	Bulgaria	2 : 1	Won
2023	Europe/Africa Zone Group I Pool A	11 Apr	clay	Antalya, Turkey	Norway	2 : 1	Won
2023	Europe/Africa Zone Group I Pool A	12 Apr	clay	Antalya, Turkey	Croatia	3 : 0	Won
2023	Europe/Africa Zone Group I Pool A	13 Apr	clay	Antalya, Turkey	Denmark	3 : 0	Won
2023	Europe/Africa Zone Group I Pool A	14 Apr	clay	Antalya, Turkey	Sweden	1 : 2	Lost
2023	Europe/Africa Zone Promotion Play-off	15 Apr	clay	Antalya, Turkey	Netherlands	1 : 2	Lost
2023	World Play-offs	10–11 Nov	clay (i)	Kraljevo, Serbia	Romania	0 : 4	Lost
2024	Europe/Africa Zone Group I Pool C	8 Apr	clay	Oeiras, Portugal	Norway	3 : 0	Won
2024	Europe/Africa Zone Group I Pool C	9 Apr	clay	Oeiras, Portugal	Greece	2 : 1	Won
2024	Europe/Africa Zone Group I Pool C	10 Apr	clay	Oeiras, Portugal	Sweden	3 : 0	Won
2024	Europe/Africa Zone 1st to 3rd Place Play-Off	11 Apr	clay	Oeiras, Portugal	Netherlands	1 : 2	Lost
2024	Europe/Africa Zone 1st to 3rd Place Play-Off	12 Apr	clay	Oeiras, Portugal	Austria	0 : 3	Lost
2024	World Group Play-offs	15–16 Nov	hard (i)	Biel/Bienne, Switzerland	Switzerland	0 : 4	Lost
2025	Europe/Africa Zone Group I Pool B	9 Apr	hard (i)	Vilnius, Lithuania	Slovenia	1 : 2	Lost
2025	Europe/Africa Zone Group I Pool B	10 Apr	hard (i)	Vilnius, Lithuania	Lithuania	2 : 1	Won
2025	Europe/Africa Zone Promotion Play-off	12 Apr	hard (i)	Vilnius, Lithuania	Croatia	1 : 2	Lost
2026	Europe/Africa Zone Group I Pool A	7–8 Apr	clay	Oeiras, Portugal	Slovakia	2 : 1	Won
2026	Europe/Africa Zone Group I Pool A	8 Apr	clay	Oeiras, Portugal	Croatia	2 : 1	Won
2026	Europe/Africa Zone Group I Pool A	9 Apr	clay	Oeiras, Portugal	Lithuania	3 : 0	Won
2026	Europe/Africa Zone 1st to 3rd Place Play-Off	10 Apr	clay	Oeiras, Portugal	Sweden	1 : 2	Lost
2026	Europe/Africa Zone 1st to 3rd Place Play-Off	11 Apr	clay	Oeiras, Portugal	France	0 : 2	Lost

== Captains ==
List of Serbia BJK Cup team captains
Name	Tenure	Total
Lea Habunek	1968–1981	14
Jelena Genčić	1981–1994	14
Dragan Ćirić	1995–1997	3
Biljana Veselinović	1997–2004	8
Tatjana Ječmenica (1/2)	2005–2007	3
Dejan Vraneš	2007–2014	8
Tatjana Ječmenica (2/2)	2014–2020	7
Dušan Vemić	2020–	7

== See also ==
- Billie Jean King Cup
- Serbia Davis Cup team
- Serbia at the Hopman Cup
- Tennis Federation of Serbia
