= 2013 Fed Cup World Group =

Part of tennis tournament

- Date: 9 February – 3 November
- Edition: 23rd

Champions
- Italy
- Fed Cup

The World Group was the highest level of Fed Cup (women's tennis) competition in 2013. First seeds Czech Republic were the defending champions, but they were defeated in the semi-finals by Italy. Italy won the final against Russia.

== Participating teams ==
Participating teams
Australia	Czech Republic	Italy	Japan
Russia	Serbia	Slovakia	United States

== Draw ==
Quarterfinals; 9–10 February
Ostrava, Czech Republic (Indoor hard)
1	Czech Republic	4
Australia	0
Rimini, Italy (Indoor clay)
United States	2
3	Italy	3
Moscow, Russia (Indoor hard)
4	Russia	3
Japan	2
Niš, Serbia (Indoor hard)
Slovakia	3
2	Serbia	2

Semifinals; 20–21 April
Palermo, Italy (Outdoor clay)
1	Czech Republic	1
3	Italy	3
Moscow, Russia (Indoor clay)
4	Russia	3
Slovakia	2

Final; 2–3 November
Cagliari, Italy (Outdoor clay)
3	Italy	4
4	Russia	0

== First round ==
=== Czech Republic vs. Australia ===
Czech Republic
4
ČEZ Aréna, Ostrava, Czech Republic
9–10 February 2013
Novacrylic ultracushion hard (indoors)

Australia
0

			1	2	3
1	(Czech Republic) (Australia)	Petra Kvitová; Jarmila Gajdošová	7^{7} 6^{2}	6; 3
2	(Czech Republic) (Australia)	Lucie Šafářová; Samantha Stosur	7^{8} 6^{6}	7^{7} 6^{4}
3	(Czech Republic) (Australia)	Petra Kvitová; Samantha Stosur	2; 6	7^{7} 6^{3}	6; 4
4	(Czech Republic) (Australia)	Lucie Šafářová; Jarmila Gajdošová				not played
5	(Czech Republic) (Australia)	Andrea Hlaváčková / Lucie Hradecká; Ashleigh Barty / Casey Dellacqua	6; 0	7^{7} 6^{1}

=== United States vs. Italy ===
United States
2
105 Stadium, Rimini, Italy
9–10 February 2013
Red clay (indoors)

Italy
3

			1	2	3
1	(United States) (Italy)	Jamie Hampton; Sara Errani	2; 6	1; 6
2	(United States) (Italy)	Varvara Lepchenko; Roberta Vinci	2; 6	6; 4	7; 5
3	(United States) (Italy)	Varvara Lepchenko; Sara Errani	7; 5	6; 2
4	(United States) (Italy)	Jamie Hampton; Roberta Vinci	2; 6	6; 4	1; 6
5	(United States) (Italy)	Liezel Huber / Varvara Lepchenko; Sara Errani / Roberta Vinci	2; 6	2; 6

=== Russia vs. Japan ===
Russia
3
Olympic Stadium, Moscow, Russia
9–10 February 2013
Hard (RuKortHard) (indoors)

Japan
2

			1	2	3
1	(Russia) (Japan)	Maria Kirilenko; Kimiko Date-Krumm	7^{7} 6^{3}	6; 4
2	(Russia) (Japan)	Ekaterina Makarova; Ayumi Morita	2; 6	2; 6
3	(Russia) (Japan)	Elena Vesnina; Ayumi Morita	4; 6	1; 6
4	(Russia) (Japan)	Ekaterina Makarova; Kimiko Date-Krumm	6; 1	6; 1
5	(Russia) (Japan)	Ekaterina Makarova / Elena Vesnina; Misaki Doi / Ayumi Morita	6; 2	6; 2

=== Slovakia vs. Serbia ===
Slovakia
3
Čair Sports Center, Niš, Serbia
9–10 February 2013
Hard (RuKortHard) (indoors)

Serbia
2

			1	2	3
1	(Slovakia) (Serbia)	Daniela Hantuchová; Bojana Jovanovski	7; 5	6; 2
2	(Slovakia) (Serbia)	Dominika Cibulková; Vesna Dolonc	6; 4	5; 4		retired
3	(Slovakia) (Serbia)	Jana Čepelová; Bojana Jovanovski	5; 7	7; 5	11; 9
4	(Slovakia) (Serbia)	Daniela Hantuchová; Vesna Dolonc	6; 3	6; 2
5	(Slovakia) (Serbia)	Jana Čepelová / Magdaléna Rybáriková; Vesna Dolonc / Aleksandra Krunić				w/o

== Semifinals ==
=== Czech Republic vs. Italy ===
Czech Republic
1
Country Time Club, Palermo, Italy
20–22 April 2013
Red clay (outdoors)

Italy
3

			1	2	3
1	(Czech Republic) (Italy)	Lucie Šafářová; Sara Errani	4; 6	2; 6
2	(Czech Republic) (Italy)	Petra Kvitová; Roberta Vinci	4; 6	1; 6
3	(Czech Republic) (Italy)	Petra Kvitová; Sara Errani	2; 6	6; 2	6; 0
4	(Czech Republic) (Italy)	Lucie Šafářová; Roberta Vinci	3; 6	7^{7} 6^{2}	3; 6
5	(Czech Republic) (Italy)	Andrea Hlaváčková / Lucie Hradecká; Flavia Pennetta / Francesca Schiavone				not played

=== Russia vs. Slovakia ===
Russia
3
Sports Center Krylatskoye, Moscow, Russia
20–21 April 2013
Red clay (indoor)

Slovakia
2

			1	2	3
1	(Russia) (Slovakia)	Anastasia Pavlyuchenkova; Dominika Cibulková	7; 5	1; 6	4; 6
2	(Russia) (Slovakia)	Maria Kirilenko; Daniela Hantuchová	2; 6	4; 6
3	(Russia) (Slovakia)	Maria Kirilenko; Dominika Cibulková	7; 5	6; 1
4	(Russia) (Slovakia)	Ekaterina Makarova; Daniela Hantuchová	6; 3	4; 6	6; 4
5	(Russia) (Slovakia)	Ekaterina Makarova / Elena Vesnina; Dominika Cibulková / Daniela Hantuchová	4; 6	6; 3	6; 1

== Final ==
=== Italy vs. Russia ===
Italy
4
Tennis Club Cagliari, Cagliari, Italy
2–3 November 2013
Red clay (outdoors)

Russia
0

			1	2	3
1	(Italy) (Russia)	Roberta Vinci; Alexandra Panova	5; 7	7; 5	8; 6
2	(Italy) (Russia)	Sara Errani; Irina Khromacheva	6; 1	6; 4
3	(Italy) (Russia)	Sara Errani; Alisa Kleybanova	6; 1	6; 1
4	(Italy) (Russia)	Roberta Vinci; Irina Khromacheva				not played
5	(Italy) (Russia)	Karin Knapp / Flavia Pennetta; Margarita Gasparyan / Irina Khromacheva	4; 6	6; 2	10; 4

2013 Fed Cup champions

Italy
Fourth title

== See also ==
- Fed Cup structure
