= 2014 Fed Cup World Group II =

Part of tennis tournament

The World Group II was the second-highest level of Fed Cup competition in 2014. Winners advanced to the World Group play-offs, and the losing nations advancing to the World Group II play-offs.

== Canada vs. Serbia ==
Canada
3
Complexe sportif Claude-Robillard, Montreal, Canada
8–9 February 2014
Uniturf (indoors)

Serbia
1

			1	2	3
1	(Canada) (Serbia)	Aleksandra Wozniak; Vesna Dolonc	7; 5	2; 6	6; 4
2	(Canada) (Serbia)	Eugenie Bouchard; Jovana Jakšić	6; 1	6; 0
3	(Canada) (Serbia)	Eugenie Bouchard; Vesna Dolonc	6; 0	6; 3
4	(Canada) (Serbia)	Aleksandra Wozniak; Jovana Jakšić				not played
5	(Canada) (Serbia)	Gabriela Dabrowski / Sharon Fichman; Jovana Jakšić / Nina Stojanović	6; 2	3; 6	[7] [10]

== Sweden vs. Poland ==
Sweden
2
Boråshallen, Borås, Sweden
8–9 February 2014
Latex-ite hard (indoors)

Poland
3

			1	2	3
1	(Sweden) (Poland)	Johanna Larsson; Katarzyna Piter	6; 1	6; 2
2	(Sweden) (Poland)	Sofia Arvidsson; Agnieszka Radwańska	1; 6	1; 6
3	(Sweden) (Poland)	Johanna Larsson; Agnieszka Radwańska	4; 6	1; 6
4	(Sweden) (Poland)	Sofia Arvidsson; Katarzyna Piter	6; 2	6; 1
5	(Sweden) (Poland)	Sofia Arvidsson / Johanna Larsson; Agnieszka Radwańska / Alicja Rosolska	2; 6	2; 6

== France vs. Switzerland ==
France
3
Stade Pierre de Coubertin, Paris, France
8–9 February 2014
Acrylic hard (indoors)

Switzerland
2

			1	2	3
1	(France) (Switzerland)	Virginie Razzano; Stefanie Vögele	6; 2	6; 1
2	(France) (Switzerland)	Alizé Cornet; Belinda Bencic	5; 7	4; 6
3	(France) (Switzerland)	Alizé Cornet; Timea Bacsinszky	6; 2	7^{7} 6^{4}
4	(France) (Switzerland)	Virginie Razzano; Belinda Bencic	1; 6	1; 6
5	(France) (Switzerland)	Alizé Cornet / Kristina Mladenovic; Timea Bacsinszky / Belinda Bencic	7; 5	6; 4

== Argentina vs. Japan ==
Argentina
3
Pilara Tennis Club, Pilar, Buenos Aires Province, Argentina
8–9 February 2014
Red clay (outdoors)

Japan
1

			1	2	3
1	(Argentina) (Japan)	María Irigoyen; Kurumi Nara	6^{7} 7^{9}	6; 4	6; 4
2	(Argentina) (Japan)	Paula Ormaechea; Misaki Doi	6; 2	3; 6	6; 3
3	(Argentina) (Japan)	Paula Ormaechea; Kurumi Nara	6; 3	6; 4
4	(Argentina) (Japan)	María Irigoyen; Misaki Doi				not played
5	(Argentina) (Japan)	María Irigoyen / Paula Ormaechea; Shuko Aoyama / Risa Ozaki	0; 6	4; 6
