= 2010 Fed Cup World Group =

Part of tennis tournament

- Date: 6 February – 7 November
- Edition: 20th

Champions
- Italy
- Fed Cup

The World Group was the highest level of Fed Cup competition in 2010. Eight nations competed in a three-round knockout competition. Italy was the defending champion, and they went on to meet their fellow defending finalists the United States in the final. The Italians won for a second consecutive year, 3–1.

== Participating teams ==
Participating teams
Czech Republic	France	Germany	Italy
Russia	Serbia	Ukraine	United States

== Draw ==
Quarterfinals; 6–7 February
Kharkiv, Ukraine (Indoor hard)
1	Italy	4
Ukraine	1
Brno, Czech Republic (Indoor hard)
Germany	2
4	Czech Republic	3
Belgrade, Serbia (Indoor hard)
3	Russia	3
Serbia	2
Lievin, France, (Indoor clay)
France	1
2	United States	4

Semifinals; 24–25 April
Rome, Italy (Outdoor clay)
1	Italy	5
4	Czech Republic	0
Birmingham, United States (Indoor hard)
3	Russia	2
2	United States	3

Final; 6–7 November
San Diego, United States (Indoor hard)
1	Italy	3
2	United States	1

== First round ==
=== Italy vs. Ukraine ===
Italy
4
Palace of Sports, Kharkiv, Ukraine
6–7 February 2010
Latex-ite hard (indoors)

Ukraine
1

			1	2	3
1	(Italy) (Ukraine)	Francesca Schiavone; Alona Bondarenko	1; 6	4; 6
2	(Italy) (Ukraine)	Flavia Pennetta; Kateryna Bondarenko	7; 5	6; 3
3	(Italy) (Ukraine)	Flavia Pennetta; Alona Bondarenko	7; 5	7^{7} 6^{3}
4	(Italy) (Ukraine)	Francesca Schiavone; Kateryna Bondarenko	2; 6	6; 1	6; 1
5	(Italy) (Ukraine)	Sara Errani / Roberta Vinci; Mariya Koryttseva / Viktoriya Kutuzova	6; 1	6; 3

=== Czech Republic vs. Germany ===
Czech Republic
3
Brno Exhibition Centre, Brno, Czech Republic
6–7 February 2010
Taraflex (indoors)

Germany
2

			1	2	3
1	(Czech Republic) (Germany)	Lucie Šafářová; Anna-Lena Grönefeld	2; 6	2; 6
2	(Czech Republic) (Germany)	Petra Kvitová; Andrea Petkovic	6; 4	6; 4
3	(Czech Republic) (Germany)	Lucie Hradecká; Andrea Petkovic	6; 1	7^{7} 6^{5}
4	(Czech Republic) (Germany)	Petra Kvitová; Anna-Lena Grönefeld	6; 4	3; 6	2; 6
5	(Czech Republic) (Germany)	Lucie Hradecká / Květa Peschke; Anna-Lena Grönefeld / Tatjana Malek	6; 1	6; 3

=== Russia vs. Serbia ===
Russia
3
Belgrade Arena, Belgrade, Serbia
6–7 February 2010
RuKortHard (indoors)

Serbia
2

			1	2	3
1	(Russia) (Serbia)	Svetlana Kuznetsova; Ana Ivanovic	6; 1	6; 4
2	(Russia) (Serbia)	Alisa Kleybanova; Jelena Janković	6; 4	4; 6	0; 6
3	(Russia) (Serbia)	Svetlana Kuznetsova; Jelena Janković	3; 6	6; 4	3; 6
4	(Russia) (Serbia)	Alisa Kleybanova; Ana Ivanovic	6; 2	6; 3
5	(Russia) (Serbia)	Alisa Kleybanova / Svetlana Kuznetsova; Ana Ivanovic / Jelena Janković	6; 1	6; 4

=== France vs. United States ===
France
1
Stade couvert régional, Lievin, France
6–7 February 2010
Red clay (indoors)

United States
4

			1	2	3
1	(France) (United States)	Alizé Cornet; Bethanie Mattek-Sands	6^{7} 7^{9}	5; 7
2	(France) (United States)	Pauline Parmentier; Melanie Oudin	4; 6	4; 6
3	(France) (United States)	Julie Coin; Melanie Oudin	6^{3} 7^{7}	4; 6
4	(France) (United States)	Pauline Parmentier; Christina McHale	6; 4	6; 4
5	(France) (United States)	Stéphanie Cohen-Aloro / Alizé Cornet; Liezel Huber / Bethanie Mattek-Sands	2; 6	3; 6

== Semifinals ==
=== Italy vs. Czech Republic ===
Italy
5
Foro Italico, Rome, Italy
24–25 April 2010
Red clay (outdoors)

Czech Republic
0

			1	2	3
1	(Italy) (Czech Republic)	Flavia Pennetta; Lucie Hradecká	6; 4	7; 5
2	(Italy) (Czech Republic)	Francesca Schiavone; Lucie Šafářová	6; 0	6; 2
3	(Italy) (Czech Republic)	Flavia Pennetta; Petra Kvitová	7^{7} 6^{3}	6; 2
4	(Italy) (Czech Republic)	Sara Errani; Lucie Hradecká	6; 4	6; 2
5	(Italy) (Czech Republic)	Sara Errani / Francesca Schiavone; Lucie Hradecká / Květa Peschke	6; 2	6; 4

=== Russia vs. United States ===
Russia
2
BJCC Arena, Birmingham, Alabama, United States
24–25 April 2010
Premier hard (indoors)

United States
3

			1	2	3
1	(Russia) (United States)	Alla Kudryavtseva; Melanie Oudin	3; 6	3; 6
2	(Russia) (United States)	Elena Dementieva; Bethanie Mattek-Sands	6; 4	6; 3
3	(Russia) (United States)	Elena Dementieva; Melanie Oudin	7^{7} 6^{4}	0; 6	6; 3
4	(Russia) (United States)	Ekaterina Makarova; Bethanie Mattek-Sands	4; 6	6; 2	3; 6
5	(Russia) (United States)	Elena Dementieva / Alla Kudryavtseva; Liezel Huber / Bethanie Mattek-Sands	3; 6	1; 6

== Final ==
=== Italy vs. United States ===
Italy
3
San Diego Sports Arena, San Diego, California, United States
6–7 November 2010
Premier hard (indoor)

United States
1

			1	2	3
1	(Italy) (United States)	Francesca Schiavone; Coco Vandeweghe	6; 2	6; 4
2	(Italy) (United States)	Flavia Pennetta; Bethanie Mattek-Sands	7^{7} 6^{4}	6; 2
3	(Italy) (United States)	Francesca Schiavone; Melanie Oudin	3; 6	1; 6
4	(Italy) (United States)	Flavia Pennetta; Coco Vandeweghe	6; 1	6; 2
5	(Italy) (United States)	Sara Errani / Roberta Vinci; Liezel Huber / Melanie Oudin				not played

2010 Fed Cup champions

Italy
Third title

== See also ==
- Fed Cup structure
