= Ana Jovanović =

Serbian tennis player

Ana Jovanović Ана Јовановић
- Country (sports): Serbia
- Born: 28 December 1984 (age 41) Belgrade, SR Serbia, SFR Yugoslavia
- Turned pro: 2001
- Retired: 2011
- Plays: Right (two-handed backhand)
- Prize money: $92,619

Singles
- Career record: 236–133
- Career titles: 9 ITF
- Highest ranking: No. 216 (22 June 2009)

Grand Slam singles results
- US Open: Q1 (2008)

Doubles
- Career record: 44–59
- Career titles: 1 ITF
- Highest ranking: No. 285 (10 May 2010)

Team competitions
- Fed Cup: 3–6

Ana Jovanović (Serbian Cyrillic: Ана Јовановић, pronounced [âna jǒʋanoʋitɕ, ǎː-, – joʋǎː-]; born 28 December 1984) is a Serbian former professional tennis player. She was coached by Nikola Pilić, a coach who also worked with Boris Becker.

== Tennis career ==
In her career, Jovanović won nine singles titles and one doubles title at the ITF Women's Circuit.

Representing Serbia in the Fed Cup, she holds a win–loss record of 3–6.

After retiring from playing, she was hired as a coach at the Novak Tennis Academy when it opened in November 2011.

== ITF Circuit finals ==
=== Singles: 18 (9 titles, 8 runner-ups) ===
Legend $50,000 tournaments $25,000 tournaments $10,000 tournaments	Finals by surface Hard (1–0) Clay (8–7) Carpet (0–1)

Result	No.	Date	Tournament	Surface	Opponent	Score
Win	1.	13 October 2002	ITF Ain Sukhna, Egypt	Clay	(Lithuania) Aurelija Misevičiūtė	6–4, 6–1
Win	2.	27 October 2002	ITF Al Mansoura, Egypt	Clay	(Czech Republic) Ema Janašková	4–6, 6–3, 6–2
Win	3.	4 July 2004	ITF Bibione, Italy	Clay	(Germany) Sabrina Jolk	6–3, 6–3
Loss	1.	27 March 2005	ITF Rome, Italy	Clay	(Italy) Romina Oprandi	4–6, 6–7^{(4)}
Loss	2.	24 July 2005	Palić Open, Serbia and Montenegro	Clay	(Hungary) Miljana Adanko	5–7, 1–6
NP		30 April 2006	ITF Herceg Novi, Serbia and Montenegro	Clay	(Serbia and Montenegro) Zorica Petrov	canc.
Win	4.	14 May 2006	ITF Mostar, Bosnia and Herzegovina	Clay	(Croatia) Ani Mijačika	6–2, 6–4
Win	5.	25 March 2007	ITF Athens, Greece	Hard	(Portugal) Neuza Silva	6–3, 4–6, 6–3
Win	6.	24 June 2007	ITF Sarajevo, Bosnia and Herzegovina	Clay	(Belgium) Davinia Lobbinger	6–4, 6–4
Win	7.	5 August 2007	ITF Bad Saulgau, Germany	Clay	(Germany) Kathrin Wörle	7–5, 4–6, 7–5
Loss	3.	7 June 2009	ITF Sarajevo, Bosnia and Herzegovina	Clay	(Croatia) Ivana Lisjak	0–6, 6–7^{(10)}
Loss	4.	2 August 2009	ITF Bad Saulgau, Germany	Clay	(Czech Republic) Andrea Hlaváčková	4–6, 4–6
Loss	5.	22 November 2009	ITF Opole, Poland	Carpet (i)	(Czech Republic) Sandra Záhlavová	0–6, 2–6
Loss	6.	30 May 2010	Grado Tennis Cup, Italy	Clay	(Georgia (country)) Anna Tatishvili	7–6^{(3)}, 3–6, 4–6
Win	8.	26 September 2010	ITF Novi Sad, Serbia	Clay	(Romania) Ingrid Radu	6–2, 6–3
Loss	7.	5 December 2010	ITF Ain Sukhna, Egypt	Clay	(South Africa) Chanel Simmonds	4–6, 7–6^{(5)}, 6–7^{(6)}
Loss	8.	12 December 2010	ITF Ain Sukhna, Egypt	Clay	(Ukraine) Sofiya Kovalets	0–6, 2–6
Win	9.	26 June 2011	ITF Niš, Serbia	Clay	(Slovakia) Vivien Juhászová	6–3, 7–6^{(4)}

=== Doubles: 4 (1 title, 3 runner-ups) ===
Result	No.	Date	Tournament	Surface	Partner	Opponents	Score
Loss	1.	1 June 2003	ITF Campobasso, Italy	Clay	(Serbia and Montenegro) Višnja Vuletić	(New Zealand) Leanne Baker (Russia) Ekaterina Kozhokina	1–6, 1–6
Loss	2.	25 August 2007	ITF Maribor, Slovenia	Clay	(Germany) Laura Siegemund	(Croatia) Darija Jurak (Czech Republic) Michaela Paštiková	6–1, 4–6, 1–6
Win	1.	22 September 2009	ITF Opole, Poland	Carpet (i)	(Germany) Justine Ozga	(Ukraine) Lyudmyla Kichenok (Ukraine) Nadiia Kichenok	6–4, 6–4
Loss	3.	26 July 2010	ITF Bad Saulgau, Germany	Clay	(Germany) Anna Zaja	(Netherlands) Elise Tamaëla (Germany) Scarlett Werner	4–6, 6–1, 5–7

== Fed Cup participation ==
=== Singles (3–2) ===
Edition	Round	Date	Against	Surface	Opponent	Result	Score
2005 Europe/Africa Zone Group I	RR	20–04–05	Denmark	Clay	(Denmark) Caroline Wozniacki	Win	4–6, 7–6^{(5)}, 6–4
2007 World Group II	PO	14–07–07	Slovakia	Hard (i)	(Slovakia) Dominika Cibulková	Loss	4–6, 2–6
2008 World Group II	PO	26–04–08	Croatia	Hard (i)	(Croatia) Jelena Kostanić Tošić	Win	6–4, 7–5
2009 World Group	PO	26–04–09	Spain	Clay	(Spain) María José Martínez Sánchez	Win	3–6, 6–4, 7–6^{(0)}
2011 World Group II	QF	06–02–11	Canada	Hard (i)	(Canada) Aleksandra Wozniak	Loss	0–6, 4–6

- PO = Playoff
- RR = Round robin

=== Doubles (0–4) ===
Edition	Round	Date	Partnering	Against	Surface	Opponents	Result	Score
2007 World Group II	PO	15–07–07	(Serbia) Ana Timotić	Slovakia	Hard (i)	(Slovakia) Janette Husárová (Slovakia) Jana Juricová	Loss	4–6, 2–6
2008 Europe/Africa Group I	RR	31–01–08	(Serbia) Teodora Mirčić	Poland	Carpet (i)	(Poland) Klaudia Jans (Poland) Alicja Rosolska	Loss	3–6, 2–6
2008 World Group II	PO	27–04–08	(Serbia) Teodora Mirčić	Croatia	Hard (i)	(Croatia) Jelena Kostanić Tošić (Croatia) Ana Vrljić	Loss	1–4 ret.
2009 World Group	QF	08–02–09	(Serbia) Jelena Janković	Japan	Hard (i)	(Japan) Rika Fujiwara (Japan) Aiko Nakamura	Loss	6–3, 5–7, ret.
2009 World Group	PO	26–04–09	(Serbia) Aleksandra Krunić	Spain	Clay	(Spain) Lourdes Domínguez Lino (Spain) Nuria Llagostera Vives	CND	2–6, 0–1 canc.

- CND = cancelled
- PO = Playoff
- RR = Round robin
