= Sweden Billie Jean King Cup team =

Swedish women's tennis team

Sweden
- Captain: Johanna Larsson
- Nations Ranking: 53 ▼ (24 July 2017)
- Colors: yellow & blue
- First year: 1964
- Years played: 50
- Ties played (W–L): 142 (73–69)
- Years in World Group: 21 (9–20)
- Best finish: World Group QF (1970, 1977, 1980, 1988)
- Most total wins: Sofia Arvidsson (50–38)
- Most singles wins: Sofia Arvidsson (36–24)
- Most doubles wins: Johanna Larsson (16–10)
- Best doubles team: Sofia Arvidsson / Johanna Larsson (11–6)
- Most ties played: Sofia Arvidsson (50)
- Most years played: Sofia Arvidsson (15)

The Sweden Billie Jean King Cup team represents Sweden in the Billie Jean King Cup tennis competition and is governed by the Swedish Tennis Association, known in Swedish as Svenska Tennisförbundet.

== History ==
Sweden competed in its first Fed Cup in 1964. Their best result was reaching the quarterfinals on four occasions.

== Current team (2026) ==
- Kajsa Rinaldo Persson
- Caijsa Hennemann
- Lisa Zaar
- Lea Nilsson
- Linea Bajraliu

== Former Team (2017) ==
- Johanna Larsson
- Jacqueline Cabaj Awad
- Cornelia Lister
- Mirjam Björklund

Captain: Lars-Anders Wahlgren

== Results ==
=== 2010–2019 ===
Year	Competition	Date	Location	Opponent	Score	Result
2010	Europe/Africa Zone, Group I	3 February	Lisbon (POR)	Denmark	2–1	Won
2010	Europe/Africa Zone, Group I	4 February	Lisbon (POR)	Latvia	2–1	Won
2010	Europe/Africa Zone, Group I	5 February	Lisbon (POR)	Hungary	3–0	Won
2010	World Group II Play-off	25–26 April	Helsingborg (SWE)	China	3–2	Won
2011	World Group II	5–6 February	Helsingborg (SWE)	Ukraine	2–3	Lost
2011	World Group II Play-off	16–17 April	Lugano (SUI)	Switzerland	1–4	Lost
2012	Europe/Africa Zone Group I	1 February	Eilat (ISR)	Bosnia and H.	3–0	Won
2012	Europe/Africa Zone Group I	2 February	Eilat (ISR)	Hungary	2–1	Won
2012	Europe/Africa Zone Group I	3 February	Eilat (ISR)	Greece	2–1	Won
2012	Europe/Africa Zone Group I Play-off	4 February	Eilat (ISR)	Poland	2–1	Won
2012	World Group II Play-off	21–22 April	Borås (SWE)	Great Britain	4–1	Won
2013	World Group II	9–10 February	Buenos Aires (ARG)	Argentina	3–2	Won
2013	World Group Play-off	20–21 April	Delray Beach (USA)	United States	2–3	Lost
2014	World Group II	8–9 February	Borås (SWE)	Poland	2–3	Lost
2014	World Group II Play-off	19–20 April	Lidköping (SWE)	Thailand	4–0	Won
2015	World Group II	7–8 February	Helsingborg (SWE)	Switzerland	1–3	Lost
2015	World Group II Play-off	18–19 April	Bratislava (SVK)	Slovakia	0–4	Lost
2016	Europe/Africa Zone Group I Round Robin	4 February	Eilat (ISR)	Portugal	1–2	Lost
2016	Europe/Africa Zone Group I Round Robin	5 February	Eilat (ISR)	Ukraine	0–3	Lost
2016	Europe/Africa Zone Group I Play-off	6 February	Eilat (ISR)	Turkey	0–2	Lost
2017	Europe/Africa Zone Group II Round Robin	19 April	Šiauliai (LTU)	Slovenia	0–3	Lost
2017	Europe/Africa Zone Group II Round Robin	20 April	Šiauliai (LTU)	Norway	3–0	Won
2017	Europe/Africa Zone Group II Round Robin	21 April	Šiauliai (LTU)	South Africa	3–0	Won
2017	Europe/Africa Zone Group II Play-off	22 April	Šiauliai (LTU)	Denmark	2–1	Won
2018	Europe/Africa Zone Group I Round Robin					

== See also ==
- Billie Jean King Cup
- Sweden Davis Cup team
- Sweden at the Hopman Cup
