= 2022 ITF Women's World Tennis Tour (October–December) =

The 2022 ITF Women's World Tennis Tour is the 2022 edition of the second-tier tour for women's professional tennis. It is organised by the International Tennis Federation and is a tier below the WTA Tour. The ITF Women's World Tennis Tour includes tournaments in five categories with prize money ranging from $15,000 up to $100,000.

== Key ==
Category
W100 tournaments
W80 tournaments
W60 tournaments
W25 tournaments
W15 tournaments

== Month ==
=== October ===
Week of	Tournament	Winner	Runners-up	Semifinalists	Quarterfinalists
October 3	Rancho Santa Fe Open; Rancho Santa Fe, United States; Hard; W80; Singles – Doubles	(Mexico) Marcela Zacarías; 6–1, 6–2	(United States) Katrina Scott	(United States) Elvina Kalieva (Australia) Storm Sanders	(Philippines) Alex Eala; Diana Shnaider (Japan) Nao Hibino (United States) Ashlyn Krueger
October 3	Rancho Santa Fe Open; Rancho Santa Fe, United States; Hard; W80; Singles – Doubles	(United States) Elvina Kalieva (Poland) Katarzyna Kawa; 6–1, 3–6, [10–2]	(Mexico) Giuliana Olmos (Mexico) Marcela Zacarías	(United States) Elvina Kalieva (Australia) Storm Sanders	(Philippines) Alex Eala; Diana Shnaider (Japan) Nao Hibino (United States) Ashlyn Krueger
October 3	Empire Women's Indoor; Trnava, Slovakia; Hard (indoor); W60; Singles – Doubles	(United Kingdom) Katie Swan; 6–1, 3–6, 6–4	(China) Wang Xinyu	(Germany) Eva Lys; Vitalia Diatchenko	(Slovakia) Renáta Jamrichová; Vera Lapko (United Kingdom) Maia Lumsden (United Kingdom) Sonay Kartal
October 3	Empire Women's Indoor; Trnava, Slovakia; Hard (indoor); W60; Singles – Doubles	(Georgia (country)) Mariam Bolkvadze (United Kingdom) Maia Lumsden; 6–2, 6–3	(Latvia) Diāna Marcinkēviča (Switzerland) Conny Perrin	(Germany) Eva Lys; Vitalia Diatchenko	(Slovakia) Renáta Jamrichová; Vera Lapko (United Kingdom) Maia Lumsden (United Kingdom) Sonay Kartal
October 3	Cairns, Australia; Hard; W25; Singles and doubles draws	(Australia) Priscilla Hon; 4–6, 7–6^{(8–6)}, 6–4	(Australia) Kimberly Birrell	(United States) Jessica Failla (Japan) Mai Hontama	(Australia) Talia Gibson (Australia) Lizette Cabrera (Australia) Alexandra Bozovic (Australia) Kaylah McPhee
October 3	Cairns, Australia; Hard; W25; Singles and doubles draws	(United Kingdom) Naiktha Bains (Australia) Alexandra Bozovic; 6–4, 6–4	(Australia) Destanee Aiava (Australia) Lisa Mays	(United States) Jessica Failla (Japan) Mai Hontama	(Australia) Talia Gibson (Australia) Lizette Cabrera (Australia) Alexandra Bozovic (Australia) Kaylah McPhee
October 3	Sozopol, Bulgaria; Hard; W25; Singles and doubles draws	(Bulgaria) Denislava Glushkova; 6–3, 6–3	Maria Bondarenko	(Hungary) Rebeka Stolmár (Bulgaria) Gergana Topalova	(Turkey) İlay Yörük; Kristina Dmitruk (Estonia) Elena Malõgina (France) Lucie Nguyen Tan
October 3	Sozopol, Bulgaria; Hard; W25; Singles and doubles draws	Irina Khromacheva (Estonia) Elena Malõgina; 7–6^{(7–3)}, 6–2	(Romania) Ilona Georgiana Ghioroaie (Hungary) Rebeka Stolmár	(Hungary) Rebeka Stolmár (Bulgaria) Gergana Topalova	(Turkey) İlay Yörük; Kristina Dmitruk (Estonia) Elena Malõgina (France) Lucie Nguyen Tan
October 3	Šibenik, Croatia; Clay; W25; Singles and doubles draws	(Spain) Jéssica Bouzas Maneiro; 6–3, 6–3	(Spain) Leyre Romero Gormaz	(Croatia) Tara Würth (France) Léolia Jeanjean	(Hungary) Réka Luca Jani; Iryna Shymanovich (Croatia) Tena Lukas (Bosnia and Herzegovina) Dea Herdželaš
October 3	Šibenik, Croatia; Clay; W25; Singles and doubles draws	(Poland) Weronika Falkowska (Australia) Jaimee Fourlis; 6–4, 6–2	(Greece) Eleni Christofi (United States) Christina Rosca	(Croatia) Tara Würth (France) Léolia Jeanjean	(Hungary) Réka Luca Jani; Iryna Shymanovich (Croatia) Tena Lukas (Bosnia and Herzegovina) Dea Herdželaš
October 3	Santa Margherita di Pula, Italy; Clay; W25; Singles and doubles draws	(Sweden) Caijsa Hennemann; 6–1, 7–5	(Switzerland) Ylena In-Albon	(Spain) Rosa Vicens Mas (Germany) Katharina Hobgarski	(Italy) Camilla Rosatello (Italy) Federica Urgesi (Germany) Nastasja Schunk (Romania) Oana Georgeta Simion
October 3	Santa Margherita di Pula, Italy; Clay; W25; Singles and doubles draws	(United States) Jessie Aney (Greece) Sapfo Sakellaridi; 7–6^{(7–1)}, 6–4	(Italy) Camilla Rosatello (Italy) Aurora Zantedeschi	(Spain) Rosa Vicens Mas (Germany) Katharina Hobgarski	(Italy) Camilla Rosatello (Italy) Federica Urgesi (Germany) Nastasja Schunk (Romania) Oana Georgeta Simion
October 3	Makinohara, Japan; Carpet; W25; Singles and doubles draws	(Japan) Ikumi Yamazaki; 7–5, 6–4	(Japan) Hayu Kinoshita	(Japan) Sara Saito (Japan) Aoi Ito	(Japan) Natsumi Kawaguchi (Japan) Saki Imamura (Vietnam) Savanna Lý-Nguyễn (Chinese Taipei) Lee Ya-hsuan
October 3	Makinohara, Japan; Carpet; W25; Singles and doubles draws	(Japan) Mayuka Aikawa (Japan) Momoko Kobori; 6–4, 5–7, [10–7]	(Japan) Mana Ayukawa (Japan) Riko Sawayanagi	(Japan) Sara Saito (Japan) Aoi Ito	(Japan) Natsumi Kawaguchi (Japan) Saki Imamura (Vietnam) Savanna Lý-Nguyễn (Chinese Taipei) Lee Ya-hsuan
October 3	Hua Hin, Thailand; Hard; W25; Singles and doubles draws	(China) Bai Zhuoxuan; 7–5, 6–4	(China) You Xiaodi	(Belgium) Sofia Costoulas (Thailand) Mananchaya Sawangkaew	(China) Ma Yexin (Thailand) Luksika Kumkhum; Ekaterina Reyngold (Thailand) Patcharin Cheapchandej
October 3	Hua Hin, Thailand; Hard; W25; Singles and doubles draws	(Thailand) Peangtarn Plipuech (Japan) Erika Sema; 2–6, 7–6^{(7–0)}, [13–11]	(Kazakhstan) Gozal Ainitdinova; Ekaterina Maklakova	(Belgium) Sofia Costoulas (Thailand) Mananchaya Sawangkaew	(China) Ma Yexin (Thailand) Luksika Kumkhum; Ekaterina Reyngold (Thailand) Patcharin Cheapchandej
October 3	Redding, United States; Hard; W25; Singles and doubles draws	(United States) Kayla Day; 6–3, 6–4	(United States) Jamie Loeb	(United States) Hanna Chang (United States) Liv Hovde	(United States) Robin Anderson (United States) Alexa Glatch (United States) McCartney Kessler (India) Karman Thandi
October 3	Redding, United States; Hard; W25; Singles and doubles draws	(United States) Rasheeda McAdoo (Ukraine) Ganna Poznikhirenko; 7–6^{(7–3)}, 7–5	(United States) Alexa Glatch (Indonesia) Aldila Sutjiadi	(United States) Hanna Chang (United States) Liv Hovde	(United States) Robin Anderson (United States) Alexa Glatch (United States) McCartney Kessler (India) Karman Thandi
October 3	Eldorado, Argentina; Clay; W15; Singles and doubles draws	(Argentina) Luciana Moyano; 1–6, 6–4, 6–4	(France) Emma Léné	(Argentina) Luisina Giovannini (Argentina) Tiziana Rossini	(Brazil) Maria Carolina Ferreira Turchetto (Bulgaria) Ani Vangelova (Brazil) Luana Plaza Araújo (Chile) Fernanda Astete
October 3	Eldorado, Argentina; Clay; W15; Singles and doubles draws	(Argentina) Berta Bonardi (Argentina) Tiziana Rossini; 7–6^{(7–3)}, 4–6, [10–7]	(Mexico) Marian Gómez Pezuela Cano (Argentina) Luciana Moyano	(Argentina) Luisina Giovannini (Argentina) Tiziana Rossini	(Brazil) Maria Carolina Ferreira Turchetto (Bulgaria) Ani Vangelova (Brazil) Luana Plaza Araújo (Chile) Fernanda Astete
October 3	Sharm El Sheikh, Egypt; Hard; W15; Singles and doubles draws	Polina Iatcenko; 6–1, 6–1	(New Zealand) Vivian Yang	(Austria) Tamara Kostic (Romania) Karola Bejenaru	(Switzerland) Amra Sadiković (United Kingdom) Ranah Stoiber (Italy) Giuliana Bestetti (Belgium) Amelie Van Impe
October 3	Sharm El Sheikh, Egypt; Hard; W15; Singles and doubles draws	(Lithuania) Patricija Paukštytė (New Zealand) Vivian Yang; 7–5, 6–4	(Slovakia) Romana Čisovská (Slovakia) Barbora Matúšová	(Austria) Tamara Kostic (Romania) Karola Bejenaru	(Switzerland) Amra Sadiković (United Kingdom) Ranah Stoiber (Italy) Giuliana Bestetti (Belgium) Amelie Van Impe
October 3	Reims, France; Hard (indoor); W15; Singles and doubles draws	(Switzerland) Céline Naef; 6–2, 6–7^{(3–7)}, 6–3	(France) Manon Léonard	(Switzerland) Fiona Ganz (Germany) Angelina Wirges	(France) Jade Bornay (France) Émeline Dartron (Sweden) Kajsa Rinaldo Persson (France) Loïs Boisson
October 3	Reims, France; Hard (indoor); W15; Singles and doubles draws	(Slovakia) Irina Balus (Switzerland) Céline Naef; 6–2, 6–0	(France) Mallaurie Noël (France) Margot Yerolymos	(Switzerland) Fiona Ganz (Germany) Angelina Wirges	(France) Jade Bornay (France) Émeline Dartron (Sweden) Kajsa Rinaldo Persson (France) Loïs Boisson
October 3	Baza, Spain; Hard; W15; Singles and doubles draws	(Argentina) Lucía Peyre; 6–3, 6–3	(Ukraine) Nadiya Kolb	(France) Lola Marandel (Switzerland) Alina Granwehr	(Spain) Olga Parres Azcoitia (Portugal) Ana Filipa Santos (Spain) Lidia Moreno Arias (Sweden) Julita Saner
October 3	Baza, Spain; Hard; W15; Singles and doubles draws	(Spain) Lucía Llinares Domingo (Spain) Olga Parres Azcoitia; 7–5, 2–6, [13–11]	(Ukraine) Maryna Kolb (Ukraine) Nadiya Kolb	(France) Lola Marandel (Switzerland) Alina Granwehr	(Spain) Olga Parres Azcoitia (Portugal) Ana Filipa Santos (Spain) Lidia Moreno Arias (Sweden) Julita Saner
October 3	Monastir, Tunisia; Hard; W15; Singles and doubles draws	(China) Wei Sijia; 6–2, 6–0	(Japan) Kyoka Kubo	(Chinese Taipei) Lee Ya-hsin (India) Jennifer Luikham	(Ukraine) Kateryna Lazarenko (Switzerland) Kristina Milenkovic (France) Marie Villet (Switzerland) Naïma Karamoko
October 3	Monastir, Tunisia; Hard; W15; Singles and doubles draws	(Chinese Taipei) Lee Ya-hsin (Chinese Taipei) Tsao Chia-yi; 1–6, 6–1, [10–3]	(Indonesia) Priska Madelyn Nugroho (China) Wei Sijia	(Chinese Taipei) Lee Ya-hsin (India) Jennifer Luikham	(Ukraine) Kateryna Lazarenko (Switzerland) Kristina Milenkovic (France) Marie Villet (Switzerland) Naïma Karamoko
October 10	Empire Women's Indoor; Trnava, Slovakia; Hard (indoor); W60; Singles – Doubles	(Germany) Eva Lys; 6–2, 4–6, 6–2	(Slovakia) Anna Karolína Schmiedlová	(United States) Caty McNally (Czech Republic) Lucie Havlíčková	(Czech Republic) Linda Nosková; Anastasia Tikhonova; Vitalia Diatchenko (Slovakia) Rebecca Šramková
October 10	Empire Women's Indoor; Trnava, Slovakia; Hard (indoor); W60; Singles – Doubles	Sofya Lansere (Slovakia) Rebecca Šramková; 4–6, 6–2, [11–9]	(Chinese Taipei) Lee Pei-chi (Chinese Taipei) Wu Fang-hsien	(United States) Caty McNally (Czech Republic) Lucie Havlíčková	(Czech Republic) Linda Nosková; Anastasia Tikhonova; Vitalia Diatchenko (Slovakia) Rebecca Šramková
October 10	Open Feu Aziz Zouhir; Monastir, Tunisia; Hard; W60; Singles – Doubles	(France) Kristina Mladenovic; 6–1, 3–6, 7–5	(Slovenia) Tamara Zidanšek	(Greece) Despina Papamichail (Italy) Sara Errani	(Romania) Oana Gavrilă (Poland) Weronika Falkowska (Indonesia) Priska Madelyn Nugroho (China) Wei Sijia
October 10	Open Feu Aziz Zouhir; Monastir, Tunisia; Hard; W60; Singles – Doubles	(Indonesia) Priska Madelyn Nugroho (China) Wei Sijia; 6–3, 6–2	(Netherlands) Isabelle Haverlag (Netherlands) Suzan Lamens	(Greece) Despina Papamichail (Italy) Sara Errani	(Romania) Oana Gavrilă (Poland) Weronika Falkowska (Indonesia) Priska Madelyn Nugroho (China) Wei Sijia
October 10	Henderson Tennis Open; Las Vegas, United States; Hard; W60; Singles – Doubles	(China) Yuan Yue; 4–6, 6–3, 6–1	Diana Shnaider	(Mexico) Marcela Zacarías (Sweden) Rebecca Peterson	(Hong Kong) Eudice Chong (United States) Katie Volynets (Australia) Astra Sharma (Belgium) Yanina Wickmayer
October 10	Henderson Tennis Open; Las Vegas, United States; Hard; W60; Singles – Doubles	(United States) Carmen Corley (United States) Ivana Corley; 6–2, 6–0	(Serbia) Katarina Kozarov; Veronica Miroshnichenko	(Mexico) Marcela Zacarías (Sweden) Rebecca Peterson	(Hong Kong) Eudice Chong (United States) Katie Volynets (Australia) Astra Sharma (Belgium) Yanina Wickmayer
October 10	Tucumán, Argentina; Clay; W25; Singles and doubles draws	(Argentina) Paula Ormaechea; 6–2, 6–3	(Ukraine) Valeriya Strakhova	(Argentina) Martina Capurro Taborda (Argentina) Solana Sierra	(Netherlands) Lexie Stevens (Brazil) Gabriela Cé (Argentina) Luciana Moyano (Argentina) Julia Riera
October 10	Tucumán, Argentina; Clay; W25; Singles and doubles draws	(Netherlands) Lexie Stevens (Ukraine) Valeriya Strakhova; 6–3, 6–2	(Mexico) Marian Gómez Pezuela Cano (Argentina) Luciana Moyano	(Argentina) Martina Capurro Taborda (Argentina) Solana Sierra	(Netherlands) Lexie Stevens (Brazil) Gabriela Cé (Argentina) Luciana Moyano (Argentina) Julia Riera
October 10	Cairns, Australia; Hard; W25; Singles and doubles draws	(Australia) Lizette Cabrera; 5–7, 6–3, 6–2	(United Kingdom) Naiktha Bains	(Australia) Priscilla Hon (Australia) Olivia Gadecki	(Australia) Kimberly Birrell (Australia) Petra Hule (Japan) Mai Hontama (Australia) Destanee Aiava
October 10	Cairns, Australia; Hard; W25; Singles and doubles draws	(Australia) Talia Gibson (Australia) Petra Hule; 6–1, 6–4	(Australia) Alana Parnaby (Australia) Taylah Preston	(Australia) Priscilla Hon (Australia) Olivia Gadecki	(Australia) Kimberly Birrell (Australia) Petra Hule (Japan) Mai Hontama (Australia) Destanee Aiava
October 10	Sozopol, Bulgaria; Hard; W25; Singles and doubles draws	(Turkey) Zeynep Sönmez; 7–5, 6–4	Darya Astakhova	(Czech Republic) Gabriela Knutson; Kristina Dmitruk	(Romania) Ilona Georgiana Ghioroaie (Estonia) Elena Malõgina (Romania) Miriam Bulgaru (Bulgaria) Daria Shalamanova
October 10	Sozopol, Bulgaria; Hard; W25; Singles and doubles draws	Darya Astakhova; Irina Khromacheva; Walkover	(Netherlands) Jasmijn Gimbrère (Estonia) Elena Malõgina	(Czech Republic) Gabriela Knutson; Kristina Dmitruk	(Romania) Ilona Georgiana Ghioroaie (Estonia) Elena Malõgina (Romania) Miriam Bulgaru (Bulgaria) Daria Shalamanova
October 10	Fredericton, Canada; Hard (indoor); W25; Singles and doubles draws	(Canada) Stacey Fung; 7–5, 6–3	(Netherlands) Arianne Hartono	(Chinese Taipei) Liang En-shuo (Czech Republic) Anna Sisková	(Canada) Marina Stakusic (India) Karman Thandi (United States) Kennedy Shaffer (Czech Republic) Michaela Bayerlová
October 10	Fredericton, Canada; Hard (indoor); W25; Singles and doubles draws	(Netherlands) Arianne Hartono (Australia) Olivia Tjandramulia; 7–5, 6–1	(Slovakia) Viktória Morvayová (Czech Republic) Anna Sisková	(Chinese Taipei) Liang En-shuo (Czech Republic) Anna Sisková	(Canada) Marina Stakusic (India) Karman Thandi (United States) Kennedy Shaffer (Czech Republic) Michaela Bayerlová
October 10	Cherbourg-en-Cotentin, France; Hard (indoor); W25+H; Singles and doubles draws	(Switzerland) Céline Naef; 3–6, 7–5, 6–2	(Spain) Irene Burillo Escorihuela	(Czech Republic) Barbora Palicová (France) Elsa Jacquemot	(France) Mallaurie Noël (United Kingdom) Yuriko Miyazaki (France) Margaux Rouvroy; Ekaterina Kazionova
October 10	Cherbourg-en-Cotentin, France; Hard (indoor); W25+H; Singles and doubles draws	(Spain) Irene Burillo Escorihuela (Spain) Andrea Lázaro García; 6–3, 6–4	(India) Ankita Raina (Netherlands) Rosalie van der Hoek	(Czech Republic) Barbora Palicová (France) Elsa Jacquemot	(France) Mallaurie Noël (United Kingdom) Yuriko Miyazaki (France) Margaux Rouvroy; Ekaterina Kazionova
October 10	Santa Margherita di Pula, Italy; Clay; W25; Singles and doubles draws	(Spain) Carlota Martínez Círez; 7–5, 7–5	(Japan) Misaki Matsuda	(Italy) Matilde Paoletti; Amina Anshba	(Croatia) Tena Lukas (Italy) Camilla Rosatello (Italy) Martina Colmegna (United States) Jessie Aney
October 10	Santa Margherita di Pula, Italy; Clay; W25; Singles and doubles draws	(Italy) Angelica Moratelli (Italy) Camilla Rosatello; 6–7^{(4–7)}, 7–5, [10–5]	(United States) Jessie Aney (Greece) Sapfo Sakellaridi	(Italy) Matilde Paoletti; Amina Anshba	(Croatia) Tena Lukas (Italy) Camilla Rosatello (Italy) Martina Colmegna (United States) Jessie Aney
October 10	Hamamatsu, Japan; Carpet; W25; Singles and doubles draws	(Japan) Haruka Kaji; 1–1, ret.	(Japan) Ikumi Yamazaki	(Japan) Nagi Hanatani (Japan) Rina Saigo	(Japan) Eri Shimizu (Chinese Taipei) Lee Ya-hsuan (Japan) Ayano Shimizu (Japan) Sakura Hosogi
October 10	Hamamatsu, Japan; Carpet; W25; Singles and doubles draws	(Japan) Haruna Arakawa (Japan) Aoi Ito; 6–1, 7–6^{(8–6)}	(Japan) Erina Hayashi (Japan) Kanako Morisaki	(Japan) Nagi Hanatani (Japan) Rina Saigo	(Japan) Eri Shimizu (Chinese Taipei) Lee Ya-hsuan (Japan) Ayano Shimizu (Japan) Sakura Hosogi
October 10	Quinta do Lago, Portugal; Hard; W25; Singles and doubles draws	(Spain) Jéssica Bouzas Maneiro; 7–5, 5–4 ret.	(Croatia) Tara Würth	(Turkey) Çağla Büyükakçay (Portugal) Francisca Jorge	(France) Chloé Paquet (Turkey) Pemra Özgen (France) Tessah Andrianjafitrimo (Germany) Kathleen Kanev
October 10	Quinta do Lago, Portugal; Hard; W25; Singles and doubles draws	(Portugal) Francisca Jorge (Portugal) Matilde Jorge; 6–4, 6–4	(South Korea) Ku Yeon-woo (Hungary) Adrienn Nagy	(Turkey) Çağla Büyükakçay (Portugal) Francisca Jorge	(France) Chloé Paquet (Turkey) Pemra Özgen (France) Tessah Andrianjafitrimo (Germany) Kathleen Kanev
October 10	Hua Hin, Thailand; Hard; W25; Singles and doubles draws	(China) Bai Zhuoxuan; 3–6, 6–0, 6–3	(Hong Kong) Cody Wong	Daria Kudashova (Thailand) Lanlana Tararudee	(Thailand) Mananchaya Sawangkaew (India) Sahaja Yamalapalli (China) Lu Jiajing (Thailand) Luksika Kumkhum
October 10	Hua Hin, Thailand; Hard; W25; Singles and doubles draws	(Belgium) Sofia Costoulas (Thailand) Punnin Kovapitukted; 6–1, 6–2	(Japan) Risa Ushijima (South Korea) Wi Hwi-won	Daria Kudashova (Thailand) Lanlana Tararudee	(Thailand) Mananchaya Sawangkaew (India) Sahaja Yamalapalli (China) Lu Jiajing (Thailand) Luksika Kumkhum
October 10	Florence, United States; Hard; W25; Singles and doubles draws	(United States) Peyton Stearns; 6–7^{(4–7)}, 6–2, 7–5	(Germany) Alexandra Vecic	(United States) Maria Mateas (France) Tiphanie Fiquet	(Poland) Olivia Lincer (United States) Grace Min (Mexico) Ana Sofía Sánchez (United States) Victoria Hu
October 10	Florence, United States; Hard; W25; Singles and doubles draws	(United States) Allura Zamarripa (United States) Maribella Zamarripa; 6–3, 6–4	(United States) Samantha Crawford (United States) Clervie Ngounoue	(United States) Maria Mateas (France) Tiphanie Fiquet	(Poland) Olivia Lincer (United States) Grace Min (Mexico) Ana Sofía Sánchez (United States) Victoria Hu
October 10	Sharm El Sheikh, Egypt; Hard; W15; Singles and doubles draws	(Romania) Karola Bejenaru; 7–6^{(7–3)}, 6–4	Ksenia Zaytseva	(China) Dong Na (Belgium) Amelie Van Impe	(China) Shi Han; Anastasiia Gureva (United Kingdom) Ella McDonald (Turkey) Ayşegül Mert
October 10	Sharm El Sheikh, Egypt; Hard; W15; Singles and doubles draws	(Chinese Taipei) Cho I-hsuan (Chinese Taipei) Cho Yi-tsen; 6–0, 6–0	(Lithuania) Patricija Paukštytė (Estonia) Liisa Varul	(China) Dong Na (Belgium) Amelie Van Impe	(China) Shi Han; Anastasiia Gureva (United Kingdom) Ella McDonald (Turkey) Ayşegül Mert
October 10	Heraklion, Greece; Clay; W15; Singles and doubles draws	(Czech Republic) Ivana Šebestová; 6–0, 7–6^{(8–6)}	(Greece) Elena Korokozidi	(Argentina) Agustina Chlpac (Ukraine) Oleksandra Oliynykova	(Italy) Federica Arcidiacono (Germany) Fabienne Gettwart (Italy) Giulia Tedesco (Germany) Silvia Ambrosio
October 10	Heraklion, Greece; Clay; W15; Singles and doubles draws	(Germany) Silvia Ambrosio (Czech Republic) Ivana Šebestová; 7–5, 7–5	(Romania) Simona Ogescu (Greece) Dimitra Pavlou	(Argentina) Agustina Chlpac (Ukraine) Oleksandra Oliynykova	(Italy) Federica Arcidiacono (Germany) Fabienne Gettwart (Italy) Giulia Tedesco (Germany) Silvia Ambrosio
October 10	Monastir, Tunisia; Hard; W15; Singles and doubles draws	(United Kingdom) Kristina Paskauskas; 6–2, 4–6, 7–6^{(10–8)}	(Chinese Taipei) Tsao Chia-yi	(Ukraine) Kateryna Lazarenko (Poland) Joanna Zawadzka	Elina Zakharova (Uzbekistan) Milana Maslenkova (Netherlands) Stéphanie Visscher (France) Flavie Brugnone
October 10	Monastir, Tunisia; Hard; W15; Singles and doubles draws	(Chinese Taipei) Lee Ya-hsin (Chinese Taipei) Tsao Chia-yi; 6–4, 6–0	(France) Flavie Brugnone (Netherlands) Stéphanie Visscher	(Ukraine) Kateryna Lazarenko (Poland) Joanna Zawadzka	Elina Zakharova (Uzbekistan) Milana Maslenkova (Netherlands) Stéphanie Visscher (France) Flavie Brugnone
October 17	Challenger de Saguenay; Saguenay, Canada; Hard (indoor); W60; Singles – Doubles	(India) Karman Thandi; 3–6, 6–4, 6–3	(Canada) Katherine Sebov	(Netherlands) Arianne Hartono (United States) Francesca Di Lorenzo	(Hong Kong) Eudice Chong (Canada) Marina Stakusic (United States) Catherine Harrison (United Kingdom) Sarah Beth Grey
October 17	Challenger de Saguenay; Saguenay, Canada; Hard (indoor); W60; Singles – Doubles	(Netherlands) Arianne Hartono (Australia) Olivia Tjandramulia; 5–7, 7–6^{(7–3)}, [10–8]	(United States) Catherine Harrison (Belgium) Yanina Wickmayer	(Netherlands) Arianne Hartono (United States) Francesca Di Lorenzo	(Hong Kong) Eudice Chong (Canada) Marina Stakusic (United States) Catherine Harrison (United Kingdom) Sarah Beth Grey
October 17	Hamburg Ladies & Gents Cup; Hamburg, Germany; Hard (indoor); W60; Singles – Doubles	(Spain) Rebeka Masarova; 6–4, 6–3	(Belgium) Ysaline Bonaventure	(Czech Republic) Tereza Smitková (Turkey) Berfu Cengiz	Anastasia Tikhonova (Germany) Yana Morderger (Germany) Julia Middendorf (Germany) Ella Seidel
October 17	Hamburg Ladies & Gents Cup; Hamburg, Germany; Hard (indoor); W60; Singles – Doubles	(Czech Republic) Miriam Kolodziejová (Czech Republic) Jesika Malečková; 6–4, 6–2	(Slovenia) Veronika Erjavec (Norway) Malene Helgø	(Czech Republic) Tereza Smitková (Turkey) Berfu Cengiz	Anastasia Tikhonova (Germany) Yana Morderger (Germany) Julia Middendorf (Germany) Ella Seidel
October 17	GB Pro-Series Glasgow; Glasgow, United Kingdom; Hard (indoor); W60; Singles – Doubles	(United Kingdom) Yuriko Miyazaki; 5–7, 7–6^{(7–5)}, 6–2	(United Kingdom) Heather Watson	(United Kingdom) Jodie Burrage (Uzbekistan) Nigina Abduraimova	(France) Julie Belgraver (Netherlands) Lesley Pattinama Kerkhove (Spain) Aliona Bolsova (United Kingdom) Katie Boulter
October 17	GB Pro-Series Glasgow; Glasgow, United Kingdom; Hard (indoor); W60; Singles – Doubles	(United Kingdom) Freya Christie (United Kingdom) Ali Collins; 6–4, 6–1	(Spain) Irene Burillo Escorihuela (Spain) Andrea Lázaro García	(United Kingdom) Jodie Burrage (Uzbekistan) Nigina Abduraimova	(France) Julie Belgraver (Netherlands) Lesley Pattinama Kerkhove (Spain) Aliona Bolsova (United Kingdom) Katie Boulter
October 17	Tennis Classic of Macon; Macon, United States; Hard; W60; Singles – Doubles	(United States) Madison Brengle; 6–3, 6–1	(Hungary) Panna Udvardy	(United States) Katie Volynets (Brazil) Thaisa Grana Pedretti	(United States) Taylor Townsend (United States) Emma Navarro (Argentina) Nadia Podoroska (Ukraine) Kateryna Volodko
October 17	Tennis Classic of Macon; Macon, United States; Hard; W60; Singles – Doubles	(United States) Anna Rogers (United States) Christina Rosca; 6–4, 6–4	(United States) Madison Brengle (United States) Maria Mateas	(United States) Katie Volynets (Brazil) Thaisa Grana Pedretti	(United States) Taylor Townsend (United States) Emma Navarro (Argentina) Nadia Podoroska (Ukraine) Kateryna Volodko
October 17	Sozopol, Bulgaria; Hard; W25; Singles and doubles draws	(Hong Kong) Adithya Karunaratne; 6–3, 6–1	(Serbia) Mia Ristić	(Chinese Taipei) Yang Ya-yi (Georgia (country)) Sofia Shapatava	(Romania) Ilona Georgiana Ghioroaie (China) Ma Yexin (Bulgaria) Denislava Glushkova (Romania) Cristina Dinu
October 17	Sozopol, Bulgaria; Hard; W25; Singles and doubles draws	(China) Ma Yexin (Chinese Taipei) Yang Ya-yi; 6–3, 6–1	(Romania) Cristina Dinu (China) Lu Jiajing	(Chinese Taipei) Yang Ya-yi (Georgia (country)) Sofia Shapatava	(Romania) Ilona Georgiana Ghioroaie (China) Ma Yexin (Bulgaria) Denislava Glushkova (Romania) Cristina Dinu
October 17	Santa Margherita di Pula, Italy; Clay; W25; Singles and doubles draws	(Czech Republic) Brenda Fruhvirtová; 6–0, 6–1	(Switzerland) Ylena In-Albon	(Italy) Nuria Brancaccio (Germany) Katharina Hobgarski	(Latvia) Darja Semenistaja (Japan) Misaki Matsuda (Italy) Camilla Rosatello (Italy) Anna Turati
October 17	Santa Margherita di Pula, Italy; Clay; W25; Singles and doubles draws	(United States) Jessie Aney (Greece) Sapfo Sakellaridi; 7–6^{(7–2)}, 7–5	(Italy) Nuria Brancaccio (Italy) Angelica Moratelli	(Italy) Nuria Brancaccio (Germany) Katharina Hobgarski	(Latvia) Darja Semenistaja (Japan) Misaki Matsuda (Italy) Camilla Rosatello (Italy) Anna Turati
October 17	Loulé, Portugal; Hard; W25; Singles and doubles draws	(Andorra) Victoria Jiménez Kasintseva; 6–1, 6–4	(Ukraine) Katarina Zavatska	(Turkey) Çağla Büyükakçay (France) Tessah Andrianjafitrimo	(Sweden) Caijsa Hennemann (United Kingdom) Eden Silva; Mirra Andreeva (Portugal) Francisca Jorge
October 17	Loulé, Portugal; Hard; W25; Singles and doubles draws	(Portugal) Francisca Jorge (Portugal) Matilde Jorge; 6–3, 7–5	(Chinese Taipei) Lee Pei-chi (Chinese Taipei) Wu Fang-hsien	(Turkey) Çağla Büyükakçay (France) Tessah Andrianjafitrimo	(Sweden) Caijsa Hennemann (United Kingdom) Eden Silva; Mirra Andreeva (Portugal) Francisca Jorge
October 17	Seville, Spain; Clay; W25; Singles and doubles draws	(Cyprus) Raluca Șerban; 6–3, 6–0	(Turkey) İpek Öz	(Burundi) Sada Nahimana (Spain) Leyre Romero Gormaz	(Switzerland) Joanne Züger (Spain) Lucía Cortez Llorca (Spain) Rosa Vicens Mas (France) Séléna Janicijevic
October 17	Seville, Spain; Clay; W25; Singles and doubles draws	(Turkey) İpek Öz (Slovenia) Nika Radišić; 7–5, 7–6^{(7–3)}	(Ukraine) Maryna Kolb (Ukraine) Nadiya Kolb	(Burundi) Sada Nahimana (Spain) Leyre Romero Gormaz	(Switzerland) Joanne Züger (Spain) Lucía Cortez Llorca (Spain) Rosa Vicens Mas (France) Séléna Janicijevic
October 17	Fort Worth, United States; Hard; W25; Singles and doubles draws	(United States) Liv Hovde; 7–6^{(7–1)}, 6–4	(United States) Reese Brantmeier	(United States) Madison Sieg (United States) Ashley Lahey	(United States) Hanna Chang; Maria Kozyreva (United States) Rasheeda McAdoo (United States) Peyton Stearns
October 17	Fort Worth, United States; Hard; W25; Singles and doubles draws	(Serbia) Katarina Kozarov; Maria Kozyreva; 6–4, 6–7^{(12–14)}, [10–7]	(United States) Allura Zamarripa (United States) Maribella Zamarripa	(United States) Madison Sieg (United States) Ashley Lahey	(United States) Hanna Chang; Maria Kozyreva (United States) Rasheeda McAdoo (United States) Peyton Stearns
October 17	Bucaramanga, Colombia; Clay; W15; Singles and doubles draws	(United States) Kaitlin Quevedo; 6–3, 6–7^{(6–8)}, 7–5	(United States) Sofia Sewing	(Peru) Romina Ccuno (Ukraine) Valeriya Strakhova	(Colombia) María Camila Torres Murcia (Netherlands) Lexie Stevens (Colombia) María Paulina Pérez (Colombia) Yuliana Monroy
October 17	Bucaramanga, Colombia; Clay; W15; Singles and doubles draws	(Netherlands) Lexie Stevens (Ukraine) Valeriya Strakhova; 7–6^{(7–4)}, 6–3	(Peru) Romina Ccuno (Colombia) María Paulina Pérez	(Peru) Romina Ccuno (Ukraine) Valeriya Strakhova	(Colombia) María Camila Torres Murcia (Netherlands) Lexie Stevens (Colombia) María Paulina Pérez (Colombia) Yuliana Monroy
October 17	Sharm El Sheikh, Egypt; Hard; W15; Singles and doubles draws	Anastasiia Gureva; 6–3, 6–1	(Lithuania) Andrė Lukošiūtė	(Israel) Nicole Nadel (Chinese Taipei) Madeleine Jessup	(Romania) Karola Bejenaru (New Zealand) Vivian Yang (Belgium) Tilwith Di Girolami (China) Shi Han
October 17	Sharm El Sheikh, Egypt; Hard; W15; Singles and doubles draws	(Belgium) Tilwith Di Girolami; Anastasiia Gureva; 6–2, 4–6, [10–7]	(Chinese Taipei) Cho I-hsuan (Chinese Taipei) Cho Yi-tsen	(Israel) Nicole Nadel (Chinese Taipei) Madeleine Jessup	(Romania) Karola Bejenaru (New Zealand) Vivian Yang (Belgium) Tilwith Di Girolami (China) Shi Han
October 17	Heraklion, Greece; Clay; W15; Singles and doubles draws	(Ukraine) Oleksandra Oliynykova; 6–4, 1–0 ret.	(Hungary) Vanda Lukács	(Romania) Ilinca Amariei (Germany) Silvia Ambrosio	(Germany) Fabienne Gettwart (Greece) Elena Korokozidi (Germany) Anne Schäfer (France) Alyssa Réguer
October 17	Heraklion, Greece; Clay; W15; Singles and doubles draws	(Romania) Ilinca Amariei (United Kingdom) Lauryn John-Baptiste; 6–1, 6–1	(Italy) Giorgia Pinto (Italy) Gaia Squarcialupi	(Romania) Ilinca Amariei (Germany) Silvia Ambrosio	(Germany) Fabienne Gettwart (Greece) Elena Korokozidi (Germany) Anne Schäfer (France) Alyssa Réguer
October 17	Monastir, Tunisia; Hard; W15; Singles and doubles draws	(Belgium) Hanne Vandewinkel; 6–3, 1–6, 6–1	(Greece) Eleni Kordolaimi	(Switzerland) Nadine Keller (Chinese Taipei) Tsao Chia-yi	(France) Flavie Brugnone (Czech Republic) Denisa Hindová (Netherlands) Anouck Vrancken Peeters (Slovakia) Radka Zelníčková
October 17	Monastir, Tunisia; Hard; W15; Singles and doubles draws	(Chinese Taipei) Lee Ya-hsin (Chinese Taipei) Tsao Chia-yi; 6–2, 6–4	(Belgium) Hanne Vandewinkel (Slovakia) Radka Zelníčková	(Switzerland) Nadine Keller (Chinese Taipei) Tsao Chia-yi	(France) Flavie Brugnone (Czech Republic) Denisa Hindová (Netherlands) Anouck Vrancken Peeters (Slovakia) Radka Zelníčková
October 17	Antalya, Turkey; Clay; W15; Singles and doubles draws	(Serbia) Tamara Čurović; 6–2, 4–6, 6–3	(Slovakia) Anika Jašková	Ksenia Agureeva (Romania) Patricia Maria Țig	(Slovenia) Petja Drame (Belgium) Chelsea Vanhoutte (Poland) Ada Piestrzyńska (Romania) Anca Todoni
October 17	Antalya, Turkey; Clay; W15; Singles and doubles draws	(Republic of Ireland) Celine Simunyu (Turkey) Melis Ayda Uyar; 6–4, 3–6, [10–6]	(Serbia) Tamara Čurović (Serbia) Bojana Marinković	Ksenia Agureeva (Romania) Patricia Maria Țig	(Slovenia) Petja Drame (Belgium) Chelsea Vanhoutte (Poland) Ada Piestrzyńska (Romania) Anca Todoni
October 24	Torneig Internacional Els Gorchs; Les Franqueses del Vallès, Spain; Hard; W100; Singles – Doubles	(Italy) Jasmine Paolini; 6–4, 6–4	(Ukraine) Kateryna Baindl	(Slovakia) Anna Karolína Schmiedlová; Erika Andreeva	(Spain) Andrea Lázaro García (Italy) Sara Errani (Andorra) Victoria Jiménez Kasintseva (Spain) Rebeka Masarova
October 24	Torneig Internacional Els Gorchs; Les Franqueses del Vallès, Spain; Hard; W100; Singles – Doubles	(Spain) Aliona Bolsova (Spain) Rebeka Masarova; 7–5, 1–6, [10–3]	(Japan) Misaki Doi (Indonesia) Beatrice Gumulya	(Slovakia) Anna Karolína Schmiedlová; Erika Andreeva	(Spain) Andrea Lázaro García (Italy) Sara Errani (Andorra) Victoria Jiménez Kasintseva (Spain) Rebeka Masarova
October 24	Internationaux Féminins de la Vienne; Poitiers, France; Hard (indoor); W80; Singles – Doubles	(Croatia) Petra Marčinko; 6–3, 7–6^{(7–2)}	(Belgium) Ysaline Bonaventure	(Philippines) Alex Eala (Denmark) Clara Tauson	(France) Océane Dodin (Croatia) Ana Konjuh (Italy) Lucrezia Stefanini (United Kingdom) Jodie Burrage
October 24	Internationaux Féminins de la Vienne; Poitiers, France; Hard (indoor); W80; Singles – Doubles	(Czech Republic) Miriam Kolodziejová (Czech Republic) Markéta Vondroušová; 6–4, 6–3	(France) Jessika Ponchet (Czech Republic) Renata Voráčová	(Philippines) Alex Eala (Denmark) Clara Tauson	(France) Océane Dodin (Croatia) Ana Konjuh (Italy) Lucrezia Stefanini (United Kingdom) Jodie Burrage
October 24	Tyler Pro Challenge; Tyler, United States; Hard; W80; Singles – Doubles	(United States) Taylor Townsend; 6–4, 6–2	(China) Yuan Yue	(Australia) Storm Sanders (United States) Sofia Kenin	(Argentina) Nadia Podoroska (United States) Danielle Lao (Argentina) María Lourdes Carlé (United States) Alexis Blokhina
October 24	Tyler Pro Challenge; Tyler, United States; Hard; W80; Singles – Doubles	Maria Kozyreva (United States) Ashley Lahey; 7–5, 6–2	(United States) Jaeda Daniel (United Kingdom) Nell Miller	(Australia) Storm Sanders (United States) Sofia Kenin	(Argentina) Nadia Podoroska (United States) Danielle Lao (Argentina) María Lourdes Carlé (United States) Alexis Blokhina
October 24	City of Playford Tennis International; Playford, Australia; Hard; W60; Singles – Doubles	(Australia) Kimberly Birrell; 3–6, 7–5, 6–4	(Australia) Maddison Inglis	(Australia) Lizette Cabrera (South Korea) Han Na-lae	(Australia) Priscilla Hon (Australia) Olivia Gadecki (Japan) Mai Hontama (Australia) Jaimee Fourlis
October 24	City of Playford Tennis International; Playford, Australia; Hard; W60; Singles – Doubles	(Australia) Alexandra Bozovic (Australia) Talia Gibson; 7–5, 6–4	(South Korea) Han Na-lae (Indonesia) Priska Madelyn Nugroho	(Australia) Lizette Cabrera (South Korea) Han Na-lae	(Australia) Priscilla Hon (Australia) Olivia Gadecki (Japan) Mai Hontama (Australia) Jaimee Fourlis
October 24	Tevlin Women's Challenger; Toronto, Canada; Hard (indoor); W60; Singles – Doubles	(United States) Robin Anderson; 6–2, 6–4	(South Korea) Jang Su-jeong	(Poland) Urszula Radwańska (Hong Kong) Eudice Chong	(United States) Jamie Loeb (United States) Robin Montgomery (United States) Francesca Di Lorenzo (Sweden) Mirjam Björklund
October 24	Tevlin Women's Challenger; Toronto, Canada; Hard (indoor); W60; Singles – Doubles	(Czech Republic) Michaela Bayerlová (South Korea) Jang Su-jeong; 6–3, 6–2	(Australia) Elysia Bolton (United States) Jamie Loeb	(Poland) Urszula Radwańska (Hong Kong) Eudice Chong	(United States) Jamie Loeb (United States) Robin Montgomery (United States) Francesca Di Lorenzo (Sweden) Mirjam Björklund
October 24	Ibagué, Colombia; Clay; W25; Singles and doubles draws	(Colombia) María Herazo González; 6–3, 6–3	(Brazil) Gabriela Cé	(Argentina) Berta Bonardi (Argentina) Julia Riera	(France) Carole Monnet (Ukraine) Valeriya Strakhova (Colombia) Yuliana Lizarazo (Colombia) Yuliana Monroy
October 24	Ibagué, Colombia; Clay; W25; Singles and doubles draws	(Colombia) Yuliana Lizarazo (Colombia) María Paulina Pérez; 6–4, 7–5	(Colombia) María Herazo González (United States) Sofia Sewing	(Argentina) Berta Bonardi (Argentina) Julia Riera	(France) Carole Monnet (Ukraine) Valeriya Strakhova (Colombia) Yuliana Lizarazo (Colombia) Yuliana Monroy
October 24	Empire Women's Indoor; Trnava, Slovakia; Hard (indoor); W25; Singles and doubles draws	Vera Lapko; 4–6, 7–6^{(7–1)}, 6–2	(Czech Republic) Lucie Havlíčková	(Slovakia) Viktória Kužmová (Czech Republic) Aneta Laboutková	(France) Alice Robbe (Croatia) Jana Fett (Croatia) Lea Bošković (Poland) Weronika Falkowska
October 24	Empire Women's Indoor; Trnava, Slovakia; Hard (indoor); W25; Singles and doubles draws	(Croatia) Lea Bošković (Poland) Weronika Falkowska; 7–6^{(9–7)}, 2–6, [10–6]	(China) Lu Jiajing (Romania) Oana Georgeta Simion	(Slovakia) Viktória Kužmová (Czech Republic) Aneta Laboutková	(France) Alice Robbe (Croatia) Jana Fett (Croatia) Lea Bošković (Poland) Weronika Falkowska
October 24	Istanbul, Turkey; Hard (indoor); W25; Singles and doubles draws	Polina Kudermetova; 6–3, 6–1	Tatiana Barkova	(Serbia) Lola Radivojević (Turkey) Çağla Büyükakçay	(Turkey) Berfu Cengiz (Romania) Cristina Dinu (Ukraine) Daria Lopatetska (Cyprus) Raluca Șerban
October 24	Istanbul, Turkey; Hard (indoor); W25; Singles and doubles draws	(Netherlands) Jasmijn Gimbrère; Ekaterina Yashina; 6–1, 3–6, [13–11]	(Romania) Cristina Dinu (Georgia (country)) Sofia Shapatava	(Serbia) Lola Radivojević (Turkey) Çağla Büyükakçay	(Turkey) Berfu Cengiz (Romania) Cristina Dinu (Ukraine) Daria Lopatetska (Cyprus) Raluca Șerban
October 24	GB Pro-Series Loughborough; Loughborough, United Kingdom; Hard (indoor); W25; Singles and doubles draws	(United Kingdom) Emily Appleton; 6–4, 6–4	(Uzbekistan) Nigina Abduraimova	(Estonia) Elena Malõgina (United Kingdom) Eliz Maloney	(Norway) Ulrikke Eikeri (Poland) Martyna Kubka (United Kingdom) Eden Silva (United Kingdom) Amarni Banks
October 24	GB Pro-Series Loughborough; Loughborough, United Kingdom; Hard (indoor); W25; Singles and doubles draws	(Chinese Taipei) Joanna Garland (Czech Republic) Gabriela Knutson; 6–3, 6–3	(Poland) Martyna Kubka (Estonia) Elena Malõgina	(Estonia) Elena Malõgina (United Kingdom) Eliz Maloney	(Norway) Ulrikke Eikeri (Poland) Martyna Kubka (United Kingdom) Eden Silva (United Kingdom) Amarni Banks
October 24	Sharm El Sheikh, Egypt; Hard; W15; Singles and doubles draws	Elena Pridankina; 6–7^{(5–7)}, 6–4, 7–6^{(7–2)}	Anastasiia Gureva	(Romania) Karola Bejenaru (Lithuania) Andrė Lukošiūtė	(Slovakia) Barbora Matúšová (South Korea) Lee Eun-hye (Chinese Taipei) Madeleine Jessup (China) Li Zongyu
October 24	Sharm El Sheikh, Egypt; Hard; W15; Singles and doubles draws	Anastasiia Gureva; Elena Pridankina; 6–7^{(3–7)}, 6–1, [10–6]	(Chinese Taipei) Cho I-hsuan (Chinese Taipei) Cho Yi-tsen	(Romania) Karola Bejenaru (Lithuania) Andrė Lukošiūtė	(Slovakia) Barbora Matúšová (South Korea) Lee Eun-hye (Chinese Taipei) Madeleine Jessup (China) Li Zongyu
October 24	Heraklion, Greece; Clay; W15; Singles and doubles draws	(Romania) Ilinca Amariei; 7–6^{(7–1)}, 6–2	(Germany) Anne Schäfer	(Germany) Fabienne Gettwart (Romania) Maria Sara Popa	(Greece) Dimitra Pavlou (Romania) Simona Ogescu; Anastasia Grechkina (United Kingdom) Lauryn John-Baptiste
October 24	Heraklion, Greece; Clay; W15; Singles and doubles draws	(United Kingdom) Lauryn John-Baptiste (Ukraine) Oleksandra Oliynykova; 6–0, 6–1	(Italy) Ginevra Parentini Vallega Montebruno (North Macedonia) Aleksandra Simeva	(Germany) Fabienne Gettwart (Romania) Maria Sara Popa	(Greece) Dimitra Pavlou (Romania) Simona Ogescu; Anastasia Grechkina (United Kingdom) Lauryn John-Baptiste
October 24	Monastir, Tunisia; Hard; W15; Singles and doubles draws	(France) Manon Léonard; 7–6^{(7–5)}, 6–3	(China) Yao Xinxin	(China) Wei Sijia (Belgium) Hanne Vandewinkel	(Serbia) Elena Milovanović (Netherlands) Marente Sijbesma (Netherlands) Stéphanie Visscher (France) Océane Babel
October 24	Monastir, Tunisia; Hard; W15; Singles and doubles draws	(Serbia) Elena Milovanović (China) Wei Sijia; 6–4, 6–1	(Tunisia) Feryel Ben Hassen (Poland) Gina Feistel	(China) Wei Sijia (Belgium) Hanne Vandewinkel	(Serbia) Elena Milovanović (Netherlands) Marente Sijbesma (Netherlands) Stéphanie Visscher (France) Océane Babel
October 24	Antalya, Turkey; Clay; W15; Singles and doubles draws	(Romania) Anca Todoni; 6–2, 7–6^{(7–4)}	(Romania) Patricia Maria Țig	(Georgia (country)) Zoziya Kardava (Serbia) Andrea Obradović	(Romania) Lavinia Tănăsie; Yana Karpovich (Switzerland) Katerina Tsygourova (Serbia) Jana Bojović
October 24	Antalya, Turkey; Clay; W15; Singles and doubles draws	Anna Ureke; Valeriya Yushchenko; 6–0, 4–6, [10–7]	(Czech Republic) Denise Hrdinková (Georgia (country)) Zoziya Kardava	(Georgia (country)) Zoziya Kardava (Serbia) Andrea Obradović	(Romania) Lavinia Tănăsie; Yana Karpovich (Switzerland) Katerina Tsygourova (Serbia) Jana Bojović
October 31	GB Pro-Series Shrewsbury; Shrewsbury, United Kingdom; Hard (indoor); W100; Singles – Doubles	(Czech Republic) Markéta Vondroušová; 7–5, 6–2	(Germany) Eva Lys	(Ukraine) Anhelina Kalinina (Croatia) Ana Konjuh	(United Kingdom) Eliz Maloney (Czech Republic) Barbora Palicová (United Kingdom) Katie Boulter (United Kingdom) Yuriko Miyazaki
October 31	GB Pro-Series Shrewsbury; Shrewsbury, United Kingdom; Hard (indoor); W100; Singles – Doubles	(Czech Republic) Miriam Kolodziejová (Czech Republic) Markéta Vondroušová; 7–6^{(7–4)}, 6–2	(France) Jessika Ponchet (Czech Republic) Renata Voráčová	(Ukraine) Anhelina Kalinina (Croatia) Ana Konjuh	(United Kingdom) Eliz Maloney (Czech Republic) Barbora Palicová (United Kingdom) Katie Boulter (United Kingdom) Yuriko Miyazaki
October 31	NSW Open; Sydney, Australia; Hard; W60; Singles – Doubles	(Japan) Mai Hontama; 7–6^{(7–1)}, 3–6, 7–5	(Australia) Petra Hule	(Australia) Olivia Gadecki (Australia) Kimberly Birrell	(Australia) Kaylah McPhee (Japan) Himeno Sakatsume (South Korea) Han Na-lae (Australia) Talia Gibson
October 31	NSW Open; Sydney, Australia; Hard; W60; Singles – Doubles	(Australia) Destanee Aiava (Australia) Lisa Mays; 5–7, 6–3, [10–6]	(Australia) Alexandra Osborne (Indonesia) Jessy Rompies	(Australia) Olivia Gadecki (Australia) Kimberly Birrell	(Australia) Kaylah McPhee (Japan) Himeno Sakatsume (South Korea) Han Na-lae (Australia) Talia Gibson
October 31	Barranquilla Open; Barranquilla, Colombia; Clay; W60; Singles – Doubles	(Hungary) Panna Udvardy; 6–2, 7–5	(Brazil) Laura Pigossi	(Hungary) Tímea Babos (Ukraine) Kateryna Volodko	(Brazil) Gabriela Cé (Germany) Lena Papadakis (Argentina) María Lourdes Carlé (France) Carole Monnet
October 31	Barranquilla Open; Barranquilla, Colombia; Clay; W60; Singles – Doubles	(Hungary) Tímea Babos (Ukraine) Kateryna Volodko; 3–6, 7–5, [10–7]	(Brazil) Carolina Alves (Ukraine) Valeriya Strakhova	(Hungary) Tímea Babos (Ukraine) Kateryna Volodko	(Brazil) Gabriela Cé (Germany) Lena Papadakis (Argentina) María Lourdes Carlé (France) Carole Monnet
October 31	Open Nantes Atlantique; Nantes, France; Hard (indoor); W60; Singles – Doubles	Kamilla Rakhimova; 6–4, 6–4	(China) Wang Xinyu	(Germany) Tamara Korpatsch (Ukraine) Daria Snigur	(Italy) Lucrezia Stefanini; Vitalia Diatchenko (Denmark) Clara Tauson; Yuliya Hatouka
October 31	Open Nantes Atlantique; Nantes, France; Hard (indoor); W60; Singles – Doubles	(Belgium) Magali Kempen (Chinese Taipei) Wu Fang-hsien; 6–2, 6–4	(Slovenia) Veronika Erjavec (United Kingdom) Emily Webley-Smith	(Germany) Tamara Korpatsch (Ukraine) Daria Snigur	(Italy) Lucrezia Stefanini; Vitalia Diatchenko (Denmark) Clara Tauson; Yuliya Hatouka
October 31	Haabneeme, Estonia; Hard (indoor); W25; Singles and doubles draws	(Norway) Malene Helgø; 6–4, 6–2	(Netherlands) Arantxa Rus	(Finland) Laura Hietaranta (Norway) Ulrikke Eikeri	(Latvia) Daniela Vismane (Slovenia) Dalila Jakupović (Estonia) Elena Malõgina (Austria) Sinja Kraus
October 31	Haabneeme, Estonia; Hard (indoor); W25; Singles and doubles draws	(Norway) Malene Helgø (Netherlands) Suzan Lamens; 6–2, 6–1	(Slovenia) Dalila Jakupović (Netherlands) Arantxa Rus	(Finland) Laura Hietaranta (Norway) Ulrikke Eikeri	(Latvia) Daniela Vismane (Slovenia) Dalila Jakupović (Estonia) Elena Malõgina (Austria) Sinja Kraus
October 31	Jerusalem, Israel; Hard; W25; Singles and doubles draws	Polina Kudermetova; 6–1, 6–1	Ekaterina Reyngold	(Hong Kong) Cody Wong; Anastasia Kovaleva	(Israel) Lina Glushko (United Kingdom) Anna Brogan (South Korea) Ku Yeon-woo (Portugal) Francisca Jorge
October 31	Jerusalem, Israel; Hard; W25; Singles and doubles draws	(Chinese Taipei) Lee Pei-chi (Georgia (country)) Sofia Shapatava; 6–2, 6–4	Polina Kudermetova; Ekaterina Reyngold	(Hong Kong) Cody Wong; Anastasia Kovaleva	(Israel) Lina Glushko (United Kingdom) Anna Brogan (South Korea) Ku Yeon-woo (Portugal) Francisca Jorge
October 31	Empire Women's Indoor; Trnava, Slovakia; Hard (indoor); W25; Singles and doubles draws	(Croatia) Jana Fett; 6–3, 6–2	(Hungary) Natália Szabanin	(Czech Republic) Tereza Smitková; Daria Khomutsianskaya	(Croatia) Lea Bošković (Romania) Miriam Bulgaru (Slovakia) Nikola Daubnerová (France) Alice Robbe
October 31	Empire Women's Indoor; Trnava, Slovakia; Hard (indoor); W25; Singles and doubles draws	Ekaterina Makarova (France) Alice Robbe; 6–3, 7–5	(Slovakia) Katarína Kužmová (Czech Republic) Anna Sisková	(Czech Republic) Tereza Smitková; Daria Khomutsianskaya	(Croatia) Lea Bošković (Romania) Miriam Bulgaru (Slovakia) Nikola Daubnerová (France) Alice Robbe
October 31	Sharm El Sheikh, Egypt; Hard; W15; Singles and doubles draws	(China) Li Zongyu; 6–3, 6–2	Ekaterina Shalimova	Elena Pridankina; Aliona Falei	(Lithuania) Klaudija Bubelytė (Thailand) Mananchaya Sawangkaew (South Korea) Jeong Bo-young (Romania) Karola Bejenaru
October 31	Sharm El Sheikh, Egypt; Hard; W15; Singles and doubles draws	(Chinese Taipei) Cho I-hsuan (Chinese Taipei) Cho Yi-tsen; 6–2, 7–6^{(7–4)}	(China) Dong Na (Thailand) Mananchaya Sawangkaew	Elena Pridankina; Aliona Falei	(Lithuania) Klaudija Bubelytė (Thailand) Mananchaya Sawangkaew (South Korea) Jeong Bo-young (Romania) Karola Bejenaru
October 31	Heraklion, Greece; Clay; W15; Singles and doubles draws	(Ukraine) Oleksandra Oliynykova; 6–3, 7–5	(Germany) Silvia Ambrosio	(Romania) Simona Ogescu (Romania) Ilinca Amariei	(Greece) Dimitra Pavlou (Italy) Matilde Mariani (Italy) Giorgia Pinto (Greece) Eleni Christofi
October 31	Heraklion, Greece; Clay; W15; Singles and doubles draws	(Romania) Ilinca Amariei (Greece) Elena Korokozidi; 7–5, 7–6^{(7–5)}	(Germany) Silvia Ambrosio (Greece) Eleni Christofi	(Romania) Simona Ogescu (Romania) Ilinca Amariei	(Greece) Dimitra Pavlou (Italy) Matilde Mariani (Italy) Giorgia Pinto (Greece) Eleni Christofi
October 31	Solarino, Italy; Carpet; W15; Singles and doubles draws	(Italy) Maria Vittoria Viviani; 7–5, 0–6, 6–3	(Sweden) Jacqueline Cabaj Awad	(Italy) Miriana Tona (Israel) Vlada Ekshibarova	(Italy) Emma Martellenghi (Switzerland) Nicole Gadient (Italy) Giulia Crescenzi (United States) Jaeda Daniel
October 31	Solarino, Italy; Carpet; W15; Singles and doubles draws	(Switzerland) Leonie Küng (Netherlands) Lian Tran; 6–2, 6–2	(Italy) Giulia Crescenzi (Italy) Miriana Tona	(Italy) Miriana Tona (Israel) Vlada Ekshibarova	(Italy) Emma Martellenghi (Switzerland) Nicole Gadient (Italy) Giulia Crescenzi (United States) Jaeda Daniel
October 31	Castellón, Spain; Clay; W15; Singles and doubles draws	Alina Charaeva; 7–6^{(7–4)}, 6–3	(Germany) Natalia Siedliska	(Spain) Olga Parres Azcoitia (France) Laïa Petretic	(Germany) Chantal Sauvant (Spain) Raquel Caballero (United Kingdom) Sarah Tatu (Portugal) Inês Murta
October 31	Castellón, Spain; Clay; W15; Singles and doubles draws	(Germany) Laura Böhner (Spain) Noelia Bouzó Zanotti; 7–6^{(7–3)}, 4–6, [10–7]	(Portugal) Inês Murta (Germany) Chantal Sauvant	(Spain) Olga Parres Azcoitia (France) Laïa Petretic	(Germany) Chantal Sauvant (Spain) Raquel Caballero (United Kingdom) Sarah Tatu (Portugal) Inês Murta
October 31	Monastir, Tunisia; Hard; W15; Singles and doubles draws	(Egypt) Merna Refaat; 6–3, 6–1	(France) Sarah Iliev	(Greece) Eleni Kordolaimi (Poland) Gina Feistel	(China) Ren Yufei (France) Helena Mohamed (Belgium) Amelia Waligora (United States) Dasha Ivanova
October 31	Monastir, Tunisia; Hard; W15; Singles and doubles draws	(Greece) Eleni Kordolaimi (Egypt) Merna Refaat; 6–3, 0–6, [10–8]	(France) Océane Babel (France) Manon Léonard	(Greece) Eleni Kordolaimi (Poland) Gina Feistel	(China) Ren Yufei (France) Helena Mohamed (Belgium) Amelia Waligora (United States) Dasha Ivanova
October 31	Antalya, Turkey; Clay; W15; Singles and doubles draws	Anastasia Zolotareva; 6–0, 6–1	(Czech Republic) Denise Hrdinková	(Serbia) Natalija Senić (Romania) Anca Todoni	Anna Ureke (Kazakhstan) Aruzhan Sagandikova (Bulgaria) Julia Stamatova (Turkey) Başak Eraydın
October 31	Antalya, Turkey; Clay; W15; Singles and doubles draws	(Chinese Taipei) Li Yu-yun (Kazakhstan) Aruzhan Sagandikova; 7–5, 3–6, [10–4]	Anastasia Zolotareva; Rada Zolotareva	(Serbia) Natalija Senić (Romania) Anca Todoni	Anna Ureke (Kazakhstan) Aruzhan Sagandikova (Bulgaria) Julia Stamatova (Turkey) Başak Eraydın

=== November ===
Week of	Tournament	Winner	Runners-up	Semifinalists	Quarterfinalists
November 7	Calgary Challenger; Calgary, Canada; Hard (indoor); W60; Singles – Doubles	(United States) Robin Montgomery; 7–6^{(8–6)}, 7–5	(Poland) Urszula Radwańska	(United States) Jamie Loeb (Hong Kong) Eudice Chong	(Denmark) Johanne Svendsen (Germany) Sabine Lisicki (Mexico) Ana Sofía Sánchez (United States) Raveena Kingsley
November 7	Calgary Challenger; Calgary, Canada; Hard (indoor); W60; Singles – Doubles	(United States) Catherine Harrison (United States) Sabrina Santamaria; 7–6^{(7–2)}, 6–4	(Canada) Kayla Cross (Canada) Marina Stakusic	(United States) Jamie Loeb (Hong Kong) Eudice Chong	(Denmark) Johanne Svendsen (Germany) Sabine Lisicki (Mexico) Ana Sofía Sánchez (United States) Raveena Kingsley
November 7	Sharm El Sheikh, Egypt; Hard; W25; Singles and doubles draws	(Netherlands) Arantxa Rus; 6–2, 6–1	Yuliya Hatouka	Alina Korneeva (France) Tessah Andrianjafitrimo	(Thailand) Mananchaya Sawangkaew (Belgium) Magali Kempen (Switzerland) Jenny Dürst (Thailand) Lanlana Tararudee
November 7	Sharm El Sheikh, Egypt; Hard; W25; Singles and doubles draws	(Netherlands) Arantxa Rus (Serbia) Nina Stojanović; 7–6^{(7–1)}, 6–2	(Belgium) Magali Kempen (China) Lu Jiajing	Alina Korneeva (France) Tessah Andrianjafitrimo	(Thailand) Mananchaya Sawangkaew (Belgium) Magali Kempen (Switzerland) Jenny Dürst (Thailand) Lanlana Tararudee
November 7	Kiryat Motzkin, Israel; Hard; W25; Singles and doubles draws	Anna Kubareva; 7–6^{(7–5)}, 5–7, 7–5	(Germany) Noma Noha Akugue	Polina Kudermetova (Israel) Lina Glushko	(Cyprus) Raluca Șerban; Ekaterina Reyngold; Anastasia Kovaleva (Japan) Misaki Matsuda
November 7	Kiryat Motzkin, Israel; Hard; W25; Singles and doubles draws	(Poland) Weronika Falkowska; Ekaterina Reyngold; 4–6, 6–4, [10–4]	(Netherlands) Jasmijn Gimbrère; Ekaterina Yashina	Polina Kudermetova (Israel) Lina Glushko	(Cyprus) Raluca Șerban; Ekaterina Reyngold; Anastasia Kovaleva (Japan) Misaki Matsuda
November 7	Keio Challenger; Yokohama, Japan; Hard; W25; Singles and doubles draws	(South Korea) Han Na-lae; 7–5, 6–0	(Japan) Miyu Kato	(Japan) Nagi Hanatani (Japan) Ayano Shimizu	(Japan) Sakura Hosogi (Japan) Momoko Kobori (Japan) Himeno Sakatsume (Japan) Himari Sato
November 7	Keio Challenger; Yokohama, Japan; Hard; W25; Singles and doubles draws	(Japan) Saki Imamura (Japan) Naho Sato; 6–4, 4–6, [10–5]	(South Korea) Han Na-lae (Japan) Mai Hontama	(Japan) Nagi Hanatani (Japan) Ayano Shimizu	(Japan) Sakura Hosogi (Japan) Momoko Kobori (Japan) Himeno Sakatsume (Japan) Himari Sato
November 7	Heraklion, Greece; Clay; W15; Singles and doubles draws	(Croatia) Lucija Ćirić Bagarić; 6–3, 4–6, 6–4	(Greece) Michaela Laki	(Greece) Elena Korokozidi (Italy) Martina Colmegna	(Greece) Sapfo Sakellaridi (Greece) Eleni Christofi; Anna Ukolova (Romania) Ilinca Amariei
November 7	Heraklion, Greece; Clay; W15; Singles and doubles draws	(Romania) Simona Ogescu (Greece) Sapfo Sakellaridi; 6–4, 6–3	(Latvia) Margarita Ignatjeva (Greece) Elena Korokozidi	(Greece) Elena Korokozidi (Italy) Martina Colmegna	(Greece) Sapfo Sakellaridi (Greece) Eleni Christofi; Anna Ukolova (Romania) Ilinca Amariei
November 7	Solarino, Italy; Carpet; W15; Singles and doubles draws	(Italy) Federica Bilardo; 6–4, 4–6, 6–3	(Sweden) Jacqueline Cabaj Awad	(Italy) Georgia Pedone (Italy) Carola Cavelli	(Netherlands) Lian Tran (Italy) Anastasia Abbagnato (Switzerland) Katerina Tsygourova (Italy) Giulia Carbonaro
November 7	Solarino, Italy; Carpet; W15; Singles and doubles draws	(Italy) Virginia Ferrara (Italy) Georgia Pedone; 6–3, 6–2	(Netherlands) Lian Tran (Uzbekistan) Sevil Yuldasheva	(Italy) Georgia Pedone (Italy) Carola Cavelli	(Netherlands) Lian Tran (Italy) Anastasia Abbagnato (Switzerland) Katerina Tsygourova (Italy) Giulia Carbonaro
November 7	Lima, Peru; Clay; W15; Singles and doubles draws	(Bolivia) Noelia Zeballos; 3–6, 6–3, 6–0	(United States) Sofia Sewing	(Peru) Romina Ccuno (Brazil) Ana Candiotto	(Peru) Anastasia Iamachkine (Colombia) Yuliana Monroy (Ecuador) Camila Romero (Guatemala) Gabriela Rivera
November 7	Lima, Peru; Clay; W15; Singles and doubles draws	(Peru) Anastasia Iamachkine (Peru) Lucciana Pérez Alarcón; 6–2, 6–4	(Peru) Romina Ccuno (Colombia) María Camila Torres Murcia	(Peru) Romina Ccuno (Brazil) Ana Candiotto	(Peru) Anastasia Iamachkine (Colombia) Yuliana Monroy (Ecuador) Camila Romero (Guatemala) Gabriela Rivera
November 7	Monastir, Tunisia; Hard; W15; Singles and doubles draws	(France) Manon Léonard; 6–4, 6–2	(Germany) Emily Welker	(Germany) Selina Dal (Romania) Karola Bejenaru	(France) Marie Villet (France) Yasmine Mansouri (France) Sarah Iliev (Switzerland) Kristina Milenkovic
November 7	Monastir, Tunisia; Hard; W15; Singles and doubles draws	(Switzerland) Naïma Karamoko (Serbia) Bojana Marinković; 6–4, 6–4	(France) Émeline Dartron (France) Emmanuelle Girard	(Germany) Selina Dal (Romania) Karola Bejenaru	(France) Marie Villet (France) Yasmine Mansouri (France) Sarah Iliev (Switzerland) Kristina Milenkovic
November 7	Antalya, Turkey; Clay; W15; Singles and doubles draws	Anastasia Zolotareva; 2–6, 7–6^{(7–2)}, 6–4	(Serbia) Tamara Čurović	(Japan) Mayuka Aikawa (Turkey) İlay Yörük	Anna Ureke (Georgia (country)) Zoziya Kardava; Polina Leykina (Kazakhstan) Aruzhan Sagandikova
November 7	Antalya, Turkey; Clay; W15; Singles and doubles draws	(Japan) Mayuka Aikawa (Serbia) Tamara Čurović; 6–3, 7–5	Ksenia Laskutova; Anna Ureke	(Japan) Mayuka Aikawa (Turkey) İlay Yörük	Anna Ureke (Georgia (country)) Zoziya Kardava; Polina Leykina (Kazakhstan) Aruzhan Sagandikova
November 7	Champaign, United States; Hard; W15; Singles and doubles draws	(China) Tian Fangran; 6–1, 6–3	(United States) Sara Daavettila	(Poland) Ania Hertel (United States) Katherine Duong	(United States) Ava Markham (United States) Ashley Yeah (United States) Tori Kinard; Maria Sholokhova
November 7	Champaign, United States; Hard; W15; Singles and doubles draws	(United States) Katherine Duong (United States) Megan Heuser; 6–0, 7–6^{(7–5)}	Maria Kononova; Maria Kozyreva	(Poland) Ania Hertel (United States) Katherine Duong	(United States) Ava Markham (United States) Ashley Yeah (United States) Tori Kinard; Maria Sholokhova
November 14	Open Villa de Madrid; Madrid, Spain; Clay; W80; Singles – Doubles	(Spain) Aliona Bolsova; 6–4, 6–2	(Germany) Tamara Korpatsch	(Poland) Magdalena Fręch (Switzerland) Ylena In-Albon	(Netherlands) Suzan Lamens (Malta) Francesca Curmi (Spain) Marina Bassols Ribera; Iryna Shymanovich
November 14	Open Villa de Madrid; Madrid, Spain; Clay; W80; Singles – Doubles	(Spain) Aliona Bolsova (Spain) Rebeka Masarova; 6–3, 6–3	(Croatia) Lea Bošković (Latvia) Daniela Vismane	(Poland) Magdalena Fręch (Switzerland) Ylena In-Albon	(Netherlands) Suzan Lamens (Malta) Francesca Curmi (Spain) Marina Bassols Ribera; Iryna Shymanovich
November 14	Meitar Open; Meitar, Israel; Hard; W60; Singles – Doubles	Mirra Andreeva; 6–1, 6–4	(Sweden) Rebecca Peterson	Ekaterina Reyngold; Maria Timofeeva	(Hungary) Natália Szabanin (United Kingdom) Anna Brogan (Cyprus) Raluca Șerban (Chinese Taipei) Lee Pei-chi
November 14	Meitar Open; Meitar, Israel; Hard; W60; Singles – Doubles	(Greece) Valentini Grammatikopoulou; Ekaterina Yashina; 6–3, 7–5	Anna Kubareva; Maria Timofeeva	Ekaterina Reyngold; Maria Timofeeva	(Hungary) Natália Szabanin (United Kingdom) Anna Brogan (Cyprus) Raluca Șerban (Chinese Taipei) Lee Pei-chi
November 14	Ando Securities Open; Tokyo, Japan; Hard (indoor); W60; Singles – Doubles	(China) Wang Xinyu; 6–1, 4–6, 6–3	(Japan) Moyuka Uchijima	(Ukraine) Katarina Zavatska (South Korea) Han Na-lae	(Japan) Misaki Doi (Japan) Mai Hontama (Japan) Kyōka Okamura (Japan) Momoko Kobori
November 14	Ando Securities Open; Tokyo, Japan; Hard (indoor); W60; Singles – Doubles	(Chinese Taipei) Hsieh Yu-chieh (Indonesia) Jessy Rompies; 6–4, 6–3	(Japan) Mai Hontama (Japan) Junri Namigata	(Ukraine) Katarina Zavatska (South Korea) Han Na-lae	(Japan) Misaki Doi (Japan) Mai Hontama (Japan) Kyōka Okamura (Japan) Momoko Kobori
November 14	Slovak Open; Bratislava, Slovakia; Hard (indoor); W60; Singles – Doubles	(Croatia) Ana Konjuh; 2–6, 6–0, 7–6^{(7–2)}	(Uzbekistan) Nigina Abduraimova	(Slovakia) Renáta Jamrichová (Czech Republic) Barbora Palicová	(Slovakia) Anna Karolína Schmiedlová (Czech Republic) Nikola Bartůňková (Hungary) Amarissa Kiara Tóth (Ukraine) Daria Snigur
November 14	Slovak Open; Bratislava, Slovakia; Hard (indoor); W60; Singles – Doubles	(Czech Republic) Jesika Malečková (Czech Republic) Renata Voráčová; 2–6, 7–5, [13–11]	(Slovakia) Katarína Kužmová (Slovakia) Viktória Kužmová	(Slovakia) Renáta Jamrichová (Czech Republic) Barbora Palicová	(Slovakia) Anna Karolína Schmiedlová (Czech Republic) Nikola Bartůňková (Hungary) Amarissa Kiara Tóth (Ukraine) Daria Snigur
November 14	Traralgon International; Traralgon, Australia; Hard; W25; Singles and doubles draws	(Indonesia) Priska Madelyn Nugroho; 6–4, 6–4	(United Kingdom) Naiktha Bains	(Australia) Destanee Aiava (Australia) Talia Gibson	(India) Ankita Raina (Japan) Haruna Arakawa (Australia) Alana Parnaby (Australia) Alexandra Bozovic
November 14	Traralgon International; Traralgon, Australia; Hard; W25; Singles and doubles draws	(United Kingdom) Naiktha Bains (Australia) Alana Parnaby; 7–6^{(7–4)}, 6–2	(Japan) Haruna Arakawa (Japan) Natsuho Arakawa	(Australia) Destanee Aiava (Australia) Talia Gibson	(India) Ankita Raina (Japan) Haruna Arakawa (Australia) Alana Parnaby (Australia) Alexandra Bozovic
November 14	Sharm El Sheikh, Egypt; Hard; W25; Singles and doubles draws	(Serbia) Nina Stojanović; 7–6^{(12–10)}, 5–7, 6–1	Tatiana Prozorova	Alina Korneeva; Ekaterina Shalimova	(China) Bai Zhuoxuan (Belgium) Magali Kempen (Hong Kong) Adithya Karunaratne (Croatia) Petra Marčinko
November 14	Sharm El Sheikh, Egypt; Hard; W25; Singles and doubles draws	Polina Iatcenko; Alina Korneeva; 6–1, 6–7^{(1–7)}, [10–5]	(Switzerland) Jenny Dürst (South Korea) Park So-hyun	Alina Korneeva; Ekaterina Shalimova	(China) Bai Zhuoxuan (Belgium) Magali Kempen (Hong Kong) Adithya Karunaratne (Croatia) Petra Marčinko
November 14	Helsinki, Finland; Hard (indoor); W25; Singles and doubles draws	(United States) Taylor Ng; 6–4, 2–6, 7–6^{(7–5)}	(Germany) Mona Barthel	(Poland) Katarzyna Kawa (Estonia) Elena Malõgina	(Slovenia) Dalila Jakupović (Norway) Malene Helgø (Germany) Julia Stusek (Sweden) Caijsa Hennemann
November 14	Helsinki, Finland; Hard (indoor); W25; Singles and doubles draws	(Serbia) Katarina Jokić (United States) Taylor Ng; 3–6, 6–2, [10–7]	(Germany) Anna Klasen (Belgium) Eliessa Vanlangendonck	(Poland) Katarzyna Kawa (Estonia) Elena Malõgina	(Slovenia) Dalila Jakupović (Norway) Malene Helgø (Germany) Julia Stusek (Sweden) Caijsa Hennemann
November 14	Saint-Étienne, France; Hard (indoor); W25; Singles and doubles draws	(France) Audrey Albié; 6–4, 3–0 ret.	(France) Émeline Dartron	(Netherlands) Lesley Pattinama Kerkhove (Switzerland) Conny Perrin	(United Kingdom) Eden Silva (Switzerland) Tess Sugnaux (Croatia) Jana Fett; Ekaterina Kazionova
November 14	Saint-Étienne, France; Hard (indoor); W25; Singles and doubles draws	(Switzerland) Conny Perrin (United Kingdom) Eden Silva; 6–4, 4–6, [10–6]	Ekaterina Kazionova; Ekaterina Makarova	(Netherlands) Lesley Pattinama Kerkhove (Switzerland) Conny Perrin	(United Kingdom) Eden Silva (Switzerland) Tess Sugnaux (Croatia) Jana Fett; Ekaterina Kazionova
November 14	Heraklion, Greece; Clay; W25; Singles and doubles draws	(North Macedonia) Lina Gjorcheska; 6–3, 6–4	(Romania) Miriam Bulgaru	(Germany) Katharina Hobgarski (Bulgaria) Julia Terziyska	(Bosnia and Herzegovina) Dea Herdželaš (Slovenia) Pia Lovrič (Greece) Michaela Laki (Romania) Arina Vasilescu
November 14	Heraklion, Greece; Clay; W25; Singles and doubles draws	(Romania) Oana Gavrilă (Bulgaria) Lia Karatancheva; 6–4, 6–4	(North Macedonia) Lina Gjorcheska (Bosnia and Herzegovina) Dea Herdželaš	(Germany) Katharina Hobgarski (Bulgaria) Julia Terziyska	(Bosnia and Herzegovina) Dea Herdželaš (Slovenia) Pia Lovrič (Greece) Michaela Laki (Romania) Arina Vasilescu
November 14	Funchal, Portugal; Hard; W25; Singles and doubles draws	(United States) Emina Bektas; 2–6, 6–3, 6–2	(United States) Ashley Lahey	(Germany) Lena Papadakis (France) Alice Robbe	(South Korea) Ku Yeon-woo (Netherlands) Stéphanie Visscher (Spain) Eva Guerrero Álvarez (Portugal) Matilde Jorge
November 14	Funchal, Portugal; Hard; W25; Singles and doubles draws	(Portugal) Francisca Jorge (Portugal) Matilde Jorge; 5–7, 7–5, [10–7]	(Germany) Joëlle Steur (Netherlands) Stéphanie Visscher	(Germany) Lena Papadakis (France) Alice Robbe	(South Korea) Ku Yeon-woo (Netherlands) Stéphanie Visscher (Spain) Eva Guerrero Álvarez (Portugal) Matilde Jorge
November 14	Solarino, Italy; Carpet; W15; Singles and doubles draws	(Italy) Beatrice Ricci; 7–5, 6–0	(Italy) Denise Valente	(Italy) Anastasia Abbagnato (Czech Republic) Ivana Šebestová	(Italy) Federica Bilardo (Italy) Virginia Ferrara (Italy) Giulia Crescenzi (Italy) Georgia Pedone
November 14	Solarino, Italy; Carpet; W15; Singles and doubles draws	(Italy) Samira De Stefano (Italy) Camilla Gennaro; 7–5, 4–6, [10–8]	(Switzerland) Nicole Gadient (Czech Republic) Ivana Šebestová	(Italy) Anastasia Abbagnato (Czech Republic) Ivana Šebestová	(Italy) Federica Bilardo (Italy) Virginia Ferrara (Italy) Giulia Crescenzi (Italy) Georgia Pedone
November 14	Nairobi, Kenya; Clay; W15; Singles and doubles draws	(Germany) Emily Seibold; 6–3, 6–2	(Kenya) Angella Okutoyi	(United States) Sabastiani León (France) Caroline Roméo	(Romania) Alexandra Iordache (India) Sharmada Balu (Slovakia) Emma Tóthová (Republic of Ireland) Celine Simunyu
November 14	Nairobi, Kenya; Clay; W15; Singles and doubles draws	(India) Sravya Shivani Chilakalapudi (Republic of Ireland) Celine Simunyu; 6–4, 7–6^{(7–3)}	(United States) Sabastiani León (Nigeria) Divine Dasam Nweke	(United States) Sabastiani León (France) Caroline Roméo	(Romania) Alexandra Iordache (India) Sharmada Balu (Slovakia) Emma Tóthová (Republic of Ireland) Celine Simunyu
November 14	Lima, Peru; Clay; W15; Singles and doubles draws	(United States) Sofia Sewing; 7–6^{(7–3)}, 6–1	(Colombia) María Herazo González	(Peru) Romina Ccuno (Japan) Wakana Sonobe	(Colombia) Yuliana Monroy (Peru) Anastasia Iamachkine (Guatemala) Gabriela Rivera (United States) Alexia Harmon
November 14	Lima, Peru; Clay; W15; Singles and doubles draws	(Peru) Romina Ccuno (Colombia) María Herazo González; 6–1, 6–3	(Peru) Leslie Espinoza Gamarra (Peru) Anastasia Iamachkine	(Peru) Romina Ccuno (Japan) Wakana Sonobe	(Colombia) Yuliana Monroy (Peru) Anastasia Iamachkine (Guatemala) Gabriela Rivera (United States) Alexia Harmon
November 14	Nules, Spain; Clay; W15; Singles and doubles draws	Alina Charaeva; 6–4, 6–3	(Spain) Noelia Bouzó Zanotti	(Italy) Irene Lavino (Serbia) Mihaela Đaković	(United Kingdom) Sarah Tatu (Portugal) Inês Murta (China) Mi Tianmi (Italy) Alessandra Mazzola
November 14	Nules, Spain; Clay; W15; Singles and doubles draws	(Chile) Jimar Geraldine Gerald González (Colombia) Antonia Samudio; 7–5, 2–6, [8–6] ret.	(Germany) Laura Böhner (Serbia) Mihaela Đaković	(Italy) Irene Lavino (Serbia) Mihaela Đaković	(United Kingdom) Sarah Tatu (Portugal) Inês Murta (China) Mi Tianmi (Italy) Alessandra Mazzola
November 14	Monastir, Tunisia; Hard; W15; Singles and doubles draws	(Belgium) Hanne Vandewinkel; 6–2, 6–1	Anastasiia Gureva	(Chinese Taipei) Tsao Chia-yi (Serbia) Tijana Sretenović	(Italy) Giuliana Bestetti (Germany) Carolina Kuhl (Japan) Natsumi Kawaguchi (Germany) Selina Dal
November 14	Monastir, Tunisia; Hard; W15; Singles and doubles draws	(Chinese Taipei) Tsao Chia-yi (Chinese Taipei) Wu Fang-hsien; 6–0, 7–5	(Latvia) Kamilla Bartone (Serbia) Bojana Marinković	(Chinese Taipei) Tsao Chia-yi (Serbia) Tijana Sretenović	(Italy) Giuliana Bestetti (Germany) Carolina Kuhl (Japan) Natsumi Kawaguchi (Germany) Selina Dal
November 14	Antalya, Turkey; Clay; W15; Singles and doubles draws	(Serbia) Tamara Čurović; 6–3, 2–6, 6–4	(Belgium) Amelie Van Impe	Alexandra Shubladze (Italy) Giorgia Pinto	Daria Lodikova (France) Emma Léné (Czech Republic) Linda Ševčíková (Slovenia) Živa Falkner
November 14	Antalya, Turkey; Clay; W15; Singles and doubles draws	(Chinese Taipei) Li Yu-yun (Japan) Koharu Niimi; 6–1, 6–2	(Japan) Mayuka Aikawa (Belgium) Amelie Van Impe	Alexandra Shubladze (Italy) Giorgia Pinto	Daria Lodikova (France) Emma Léné (Czech Republic) Linda Ševčíková (Slovenia) Živa Falkner
November 14	Waco, United States; Hard; W15; Singles and doubles draws	(Slovakia) Martina Okáľová; 6–3, 6–2	(United States) Victoria Hu	Maria Kozyreva (United States) Lexington Reed	Veronica Miroshnichenko (China) Tian Fangran; Alina Shcherbinina (United States) Aspen Schuman
November 14	Waco, United States; Hard; W15; Singles and doubles draws	(Spain) Alicia Herrero Liñana; Maria Kononova; 4–6, 6–3, [10–7]	(Argentina) Melany Krywoj (Slovakia) Vanda Vargová	Maria Kozyreva (United States) Lexington Reed	Veronica Miroshnichenko (China) Tian Fangran; Alina Shcherbinina (United States) Aspen Schuman
November 21	Open Ciudad de Valencia; Valencia, Spain; Clay; W80+H; Singles – Doubles	(Spain) Marina Bassols Ribera; 6–4, 6–0	(Switzerland) Ylena In-Albon	(Germany) Tamara Korpatsch (United States) Alycia Parks	(Spain) Jéssica Bouzas Maneiro (Spain) Leyre Romero Gormaz (France) Océane Dodin (Slovenia) Veronika Erjavec
November 21	Open Ciudad de Valencia; Valencia, Spain; Clay; W80+H; Singles – Doubles	(Spain) Cristina Bucșa (Switzerland) Ylena In-Albon; 6–3, 6–2	Irina Khromacheva; Iryna Shymanovich	(Germany) Tamara Korpatsch (United States) Alycia Parks	(Spain) Jéssica Bouzas Maneiro (Spain) Leyre Romero Gormaz (France) Océane Dodin (Slovenia) Veronika Erjavec
November 21	Traralgon International; Traralgon, Australia; Hard; W25; Singles and doubles draws	(Australia) Destanee Aiava; 6–3, 6–7^{(4–7)}, 6–4	(Australia) Lizette Cabrera	(India) Ankita Raina (Australia) Jaimee Fourlis	(Australia) Priscilla Hon (Australia) Maddison Inglis (Australia) Petra Hule (Indonesia) Priska Madelyn Nugroho
November 21	Traralgon International; Traralgon, Australia; Hard; W25; Singles and doubles draws	(Australia) Destanee Aiava (New Zealand) Katherine Westbury; 6–1, 4–6, [10–5]	(Indonesia) Priska Madelyn Nugroho (India) Ankita Raina	(India) Ankita Raina (Australia) Jaimee Fourlis	(Australia) Priscilla Hon (Australia) Maddison Inglis (Australia) Petra Hule (Indonesia) Priska Madelyn Nugroho
November 21	Heraklion, Greece; Clay; W25; Singles and doubles draws	Ekaterina Makarova; 6–4, 5–7, 7–5	(North Macedonia) Lina Gjorcheska	(Latvia) Darja Semeņistaja (Romania) Miriam Bulgaru	(Italy) Martina Colmegna (Japan) Misaki Matsuda (Greece) Martha Matoula (Italy) Sofia Rocchetti
November 21	Heraklion, Greece; Clay; W25; Singles and doubles draws	(Romania) Oana Gavrilă; Ekaterina Makarova; 6–1, 6–3	(Bulgaria) Denislava Glushkova (Ukraine) Anastasiya Soboleva	(Latvia) Darja Semeņistaja (Romania) Miriam Bulgaru	(Italy) Martina Colmegna (Japan) Misaki Matsuda (Greece) Martha Matoula (Italy) Sofia Rocchetti
November 21	Internazionali Tennis Val Gardena Südtirol; Ortisei, Italy; Hard (indoor); W25; Singles and doubles draws	(Croatia) Ana Konjuh; 3–6, 7–5, 7–6^{(7–2)}	(Slovakia) Viktória Kužmová	(Chinese Taipei) Liang En-shuo (Poland) Katarzyna Kawa	Ekaterina Kazionova; Ekaterina Ovcharenko (Latvia) Diāna Marcinkēviča (Spain) Eva Guerrero Álvarez
November 21	Internazionali Tennis Val Gardena Südtirol; Ortisei, Italy; Hard (indoor); W25; Singles and doubles draws	Ekaterina Ovcharenko (Greece) Sapfo Sakellaridi; 6–2, 6–4	(Mexico) María Fernanda Navarro (United States) Taylor Ng	(Chinese Taipei) Liang En-shuo (Poland) Katarzyna Kawa	Ekaterina Kazionova; Ekaterina Ovcharenko (Latvia) Diāna Marcinkēviča (Spain) Eva Guerrero Álvarez
November 21	Pétange, Luxembourg; Hard (indoor); W25; Singles and doubles draws	(Germany) Mona Barthel; 7–6^{(7–2)}, 6–2	(Ukraine) Daria Snigur	(Switzerland) Céline Naef (Belgium) Magali Kempen	(Czech Republic) Linda Nosková (Belgium) Yanina Wickmayer (Belgium) Sofia Costoulas (Germany) Noma Noha Akugue
November 21	Pétange, Luxembourg; Hard (indoor); W25; Singles and doubles draws	(Belgium) Magali Kempen (Switzerland) Xenia Knoll; 6–0, 6–4	(Netherlands) Bibiane Schoofs (Netherlands) Rosalie van der Hoek	(Switzerland) Céline Naef (Belgium) Magali Kempen	(Czech Republic) Linda Nosková (Belgium) Yanina Wickmayer (Belgium) Sofia Costoulas (Germany) Noma Noha Akugue
November 21	Mar del Plata, Argentina; Clay; W15; Singles and doubles draws	(Germany) Luisa Meyer auf der Heide; 7–6^{(9–7)}, 6–2	(Argentina) Berta Bonardi	(Peru) Anastasia Iamachkine (Argentina) Lourdes Ayala	(Argentina) Chiara Di Genova (Argentina) Sol Larraya Guidi (Brazil) Ana Candiotto (Argentina) Luisina Giovannini
November 21	Mar del Plata, Argentina; Clay; W15; Singles and doubles draws	(Brazil) Ana Candiotto (Peru) Anastasia Iamachkine; 6–3, 6–3	(Argentina) Luciana Blatter (Argentina) Josefina Estévez	(Peru) Anastasia Iamachkine (Argentina) Lourdes Ayala	(Argentina) Chiara Di Genova (Argentina) Sol Larraya Guidi (Brazil) Ana Candiotto (Argentina) Luisina Giovannini
November 21	Santo Domingo, Dominican Republic; Hard; W15; Singles and doubles draws	(United Kingdom) Amelia Rajecki; 6–3, 6–1	(United States) Victoria Hu	(Canada) Bianca Fernandez (United States) Lauren Proctor	(Mexico) Jessica Hinojosa Gómez (Czech Republic) Lucie Petruželová (France) Caroline Vernet (Germany) Ruxandra Schech
November 21	Santo Domingo, Dominican Republic; Hard; W15; Singles and doubles draws	(United Kingdom) Nell Miller (United Kingdom) Amelia Rajecki; 7–5, 6–1	(United States) Brittany Collens (Canada) Louise Kwong	(Canada) Bianca Fernandez (United States) Lauren Proctor	(Mexico) Jessica Hinojosa Gómez (Czech Republic) Lucie Petruželová (France) Caroline Vernet (Germany) Ruxandra Schech
November 21	Sharm El Sheikh, Egypt; Hard; W15; Singles and doubles draws	Aliona Falei; 6–1, 7–5	(Thailand) Mananchaya Sawangkaew	(Hong Kong) Wu Ho-ching (Chinese Taipei) Cho Yi-tsen	Anastasiya Apalikhina (Germany) Emily Welker; Alisa Kummel (Turkey) Ayla Aksu
November 21	Sharm El Sheikh, Egypt; Hard; W15; Singles and doubles draws	(Chinese Taipei) Cho I-hsuan (Chinese Taipei) Cho Yi-tsen; 6–3, 3–6, [10–5]	Aliona Falei; Aglaya Fedorova	(Hong Kong) Wu Ho-ching (Chinese Taipei) Cho Yi-tsen	Anastasiya Apalikhina (Germany) Emily Welker; Alisa Kummel (Turkey) Ayla Aksu
November 21	Nairobi, Kenya; Clay; W15; Singles and doubles draws	(France) Caroline Roméo; 6–2, 6–7^{(2–7)}, 6–3	(Romania) Alexandra Iordache	(Uzbekistan) Sevil Yuldasheva (Slovakia) Emma Tóthová	(Germany) Emily Seibold (United States) Sabastiani León (Republic of Ireland) Celine Simunyu; Valery Gynina
November 21	Nairobi, Kenya; Clay; W15; Singles and doubles draws	(India) Smriti Bhasin (Kenya) Angella Okutoyi; 6–3, 7–5	(India) Sharmada Balu (United States) Sabastiani León	(Uzbekistan) Sevil Yuldasheva (Slovakia) Emma Tóthová	(Germany) Emily Seibold (United States) Sabastiani León (Republic of Ireland) Celine Simunyu; Valery Gynina
November 21	Lousada, Portugal; Hard (indoor); W15; Singles and doubles draws	(Sweden) Kajsa Rinaldo Persson; 7–5, 6–2	(Spain) Celia Cerviño Ruiz	(Belgium) Clara Vlasselaer (Sweden) Julita Saner	(France) Océane Babel (Chinese Taipei) Lee Pei-chi (Lithuania) Iveta Dapkutė (Switzerland) Tess Sugnaux
November 21	Lousada, Portugal; Hard (indoor); W15; Singles and doubles draws	(France) Océane Babel (Switzerland) Leonie Küng; 7–6^{(7–3)}, 5–7, [10–2]	(Spain) Celia Cerviño Ruiz (Switzerland) Tess Sugnaux	(Belgium) Clara Vlasselaer (Sweden) Julita Saner	(France) Océane Babel (Chinese Taipei) Lee Pei-chi (Lithuania) Iveta Dapkutė (Switzerland) Tess Sugnaux
November 21	Monastir, Tunisia; Hard; W15; Singles and doubles draws	(Belgium) Hanne Vandewinkel; 6–2, 7–5	(Chinese Taipei) Tsao Chia-yi	(Poland) Weronika Ewald; Anastasiia Gureva	(Belgium) Eliessa Vanlangendonck (Serbia) Tijana Sretenović (Romania) Karola Bejenaru (United States) Dasha Ivanova
November 21	Monastir, Tunisia; Hard; W15; Singles and doubles draws	(Chinese Taipei) Tsao Chia-yi (Chinese Taipei) Wu Fang-hsien; 6–3, 6–4	Anastasiia Gureva; Vlada Mincheva	(Poland) Weronika Ewald; Anastasiia Gureva	(Belgium) Eliessa Vanlangendonck (Serbia) Tijana Sretenović (Romania) Karola Bejenaru (United States) Dasha Ivanova
November 21	Antalya, Turkey; Clay; W15; Singles and doubles draws	Ksenia Laskutova; 4–6, 6–1, 6–1	(France) Emma Léné	Diana Demidova (Belgium) Amelie Van Impe	(Turkey) İlay Yörük (Romania) Anastasia Safta (Romania) Sabina Dădaciu (Serbia) Fatma Idrizović
November 21	Antalya, Turkey; Clay; W15; Singles and doubles draws	(Chinese Taipei) Li Yu-yun (Belgium) Amelie Van Impe; 6–2, 5–7, [10–3]	Daria Lodikova (Turkey) Melis Ayda Uyar	Diana Demidova (Belgium) Amelie Van Impe	(Turkey) İlay Yörük (Romania) Anastasia Safta (Romania) Sabina Dădaciu (Serbia) Fatma Idrizović
November 28	Aberto da República; Rio de Janeiro, Brazil; Clay; W60; Singles – Doubles	Iryna Shymanovich; 6–2, 5–7, 6–4	Irina Khromacheva	Amina Anshba (Brazil) Laura Pigossi	(Hungary) Réka Luca Jani (United States) Hailey Baptiste (Spain) Yvonne Cavallé Reimers (United States) Whitney Osuigwe
November 28	Aberto da República; Rio de Janeiro, Brazil; Clay; W60; Singles – Doubles	(Brazil) Ingrid Gamarra Martins (Portugal) Francisca Jorge; 6–4, 6–3	(United States) Anna Rogers (United States) Christina Rosca	Amina Anshba (Brazil) Laura Pigossi	(Hungary) Réka Luca Jani (United States) Hailey Baptiste (Spain) Yvonne Cavallé Reimers (United States) Whitney Osuigwe
November 28	Sëlva, Italy; Hard (indoor); W25; Singles and doubles draws	(Denmark) Clara Tauson; 6–3, 7–5	(United States) Emina Bektas	(Poland) Katarzyna Kawa (United States) Taylor Ng	(Ukraine) Daria Lopatetska (Chinese Taipei) Joanna Garland (Croatia) Jana Fett (Italy) Laura Mair
November 28	Sëlva, Italy; Hard (indoor); W25; Singles and doubles draws	(Serbia) Katarina Jokić (United States) Taylor Ng; 6–3, 6–2	(Switzerland) Xenia Knoll (Italy) Angelica Moratelli	(Poland) Katarzyna Kawa (United States) Taylor Ng	(Ukraine) Daria Lopatetska (Chinese Taipei) Joanna Garland (Croatia) Jana Fett (Italy) Laura Mair
November 28	Buenos Aires, Argentina; Clay; W15; Singles and doubles draws	(Germany) Luisa Meyer auf der Heide; 6–3, 7–5	(Argentina) Lourdes Ayala	(Brazil) Georgia Gulin (Argentina) Serena Pereyra Giubbani	(Italy) Ilaria Sposetti (Argentina) Josefina Zehnder (Argentina) Sol Larraya Guidi (Argentina) María Victoria Marchesini
November 28	Buenos Aires, Argentina; Clay; W15; Singles and doubles draws	(Chile) Fernanda Astete (Peru) Anastasia Iamachkine; 7–5, 6–4	(Mexico) Marian Gómez Pezuela Cano (Argentina) María Victoria Marchesini	(Brazil) Georgia Gulin (Argentina) Serena Pereyra Giubbani	(Italy) Ilaria Sposetti (Argentina) Josefina Zehnder (Argentina) Sol Larraya Guidi (Argentina) María Victoria Marchesini
November 28	Oberpullendorf, Austria; Hard (indoor); W15; Singles and doubles draws	(Croatia) Lucija Ćirić Bagarić; 6–4, 6–2	(Czech Republic) Denisa Hindová	(Slovakia) Eszter Méri; Victoria Kan	(Austria) Tamara Kostic (India) Zeel Desai (Switzerland) Bojana Klincov (Slovenia) Živa Falkner
November 28	Oberpullendorf, Austria; Hard (indoor); W15; Singles and doubles draws	Polina Leykina (Israel) Sofiia Nagornaia; 6–4, 7–6 ^{(11–9)}	(Austria) Veronika Bokor (Bosnia and Herzegovina) Laura Radaković	(Slovakia) Eszter Méri; Victoria Kan	(Austria) Tamara Kostic (India) Zeel Desai (Switzerland) Bojana Klincov (Slovenia) Živa Falkner
November 28	Santo Domingo, Dominican Republic; Hard; W15; Singles and doubles draws	(United States) Jenna DeFalco; 6–2, 6–0	(United States) Carolyn Ansari	(Canada) Bianca Fernandez (United Kingdom) Tiffany William	(France) Caroline Vernet (United States) Victoria Hu (United States) Tara Malik (Mexico) Jessica Hinojosa Gómez
November 28	Santo Domingo, Dominican Republic; Hard; W15; Singles and doubles draws	(Czech Republic) Lucie Petruželová (Germany) Ruxandra Schech; 6–2, 3–6, [12–10]	(United States) Meisha Kendall-Woseley (United Kingdom) Tiffany William	(Canada) Bianca Fernandez (United Kingdom) Tiffany William	(France) Caroline Vernet (United States) Victoria Hu (United States) Tara Malik (Mexico) Jessica Hinojosa Gómez
November 28	Sharm El Sheikh, Egypt; Hard; W15; Singles and doubles draws	(France) Nahia Berecoechea; 6–2, 6–3	(Turkey) Ayla Aksu	(Slovakia) Katarína Kužmová; Karine Sarkisova	(Chinese Taipei) Cho I-hsuan; Ekaterina Shalimova (South Korea) Ahn Yu-jin (Italy) Giulia Carbonaro
November 28	Sharm El Sheikh, Egypt; Hard; W15; Singles and doubles draws	(Chinese Taipei) Cho I-hsuan (Chinese Taipei) Cho Yi-tsen; Walkover	Aglaya Fedorova; Elizaveta Masnaia	(Slovakia) Katarína Kužmová; Karine Sarkisova	(Chinese Taipei) Cho I-hsuan; Ekaterina Shalimova (South Korea) Ahn Yu-jin (Italy) Giulia Carbonaro
November 28	Lousada, Portugal; Hard (indoor); W15; Singles and doubles draws	(Switzerland) Tess Sugnaux; 6–1, 6–2	(Switzerland) Valentina Ryser	(Belgium) Clara Vlasselaer (France) Sarah Iliev	(France) Océane Babel (Ukraine) Yelyzaveta Kotliar (Sweden) Julita Saner (Sweden) Tilde Stromquist
November 28	Lousada, Portugal; Hard (indoor); W15; Singles and doubles draws	(Lithuania) Iveta Dapkutė (Sweden) Julita Saner; 6–3, 4–6, [10–7]	(Chinese Taipei) Lee Pei-chi (Italy) Maria Vittoria Viviani	(Belgium) Clara Vlasselaer (France) Sarah Iliev	(France) Océane Babel (Ukraine) Yelyzaveta Kotliar (Sweden) Julita Saner (Sweden) Tilde Stromquist
November 28	Valencia, Spain; Clay; W15; Singles and doubles draws	(Spain) Alba Rey García; 6–2, 6–0	(Spain) Claudia Hoste Ferrer	(Spain) Judith Perelló Saavedra (Spain) Ariana Geerlings	(Italy) Martina Spigarelli (Spain) Noelia Bouzó Zanotti (Italy) Gloria Ceschi (Spain) Lucía Cortez Llorca
November 28	Valencia, Spain; Clay; W15; Singles and doubles draws	(Latvia) Darja Semeņistaja (France) Marine Szostak; Walkover	(Spain) Lucía Cortez Llorca (Spain) Claudia Hoste Ferrer	(Spain) Judith Perelló Saavedra (Spain) Ariana Geerlings	(Italy) Martina Spigarelli (Spain) Noelia Bouzó Zanotti (Italy) Gloria Ceschi (Spain) Lucía Cortez Llorca
November 28	Monastir, Tunisia; Hard; W15; Singles and doubles draws	(France) Caroline Roméo; 6–2, 6–1	(Romania) Karola Bejenaru	Milana Zhabrailova (Switzerland) Nadine Keller	(Sweden) Maja Radenković (China) Bai Zhuoxuan (China) Li Zongyu (Belgium) Eliessa Vanlangendonck
November 28	Monastir, Tunisia; Hard; W15; Singles and doubles draws	(Chinese Taipei) Tsao Chia-yi (Chinese Taipei) Wu Fang-hsien; 6–4, 6–3	(Romania) Oana Gavrilă (United Kingdom) Emilie Lindh	Milana Zhabrailova (Switzerland) Nadine Keller	(Sweden) Maja Radenković (China) Bai Zhuoxuan (China) Li Zongyu (Belgium) Eliessa Vanlangendonck
November 28	Antalya, Turkey; Clay; W15; Singles and doubles draws	(Japan) Mayuka Aikawa; 6–1, 6–0	(Romania) Anca Todoni	(Serbia) Andrea Obradović (Georgia (country)) Sofia Shapatava	(Turkey) Başak Eraydın; Valeriia Olianovskaia (Romania) Anastasia Safta; Anna Ureke
November 28	Antalya, Turkey; Clay; W15; Singles and doubles draws	(Chinese Taipei) Li Yu-yun; Anna Zyryanova; 3–6, 6–4, [10–7]	Ksenia Laskutova; Aleksandra Pospelova	(Serbia) Andrea Obradović (Georgia (country)) Sofia Shapatava	(Turkey) Başak Eraydın; Valeriia Olianovskaia (Romania) Anastasia Safta; Anna Ureke

=== December ===
Week of	Tournament	Winner	Runners-up	Semifinalists	Quarterfinalists
December 5	Al Habtoor Tennis Challenge; Dubai, United Arab Emirates; Hard; W100+H; Singles – Doubles	(France) Elsa Jacquemot; 7–5, 6–2	(Poland) Magdalena Fręch	(France) Carole Monnet (Slovakia) Viktória Kužmová	Diana Shnaider (Slovakia) Rebecca Šramková; Anastasia Zakharova (France) Kristina Mladenovic
December 5	Al Habtoor Tennis Challenge; Dubai, United Arab Emirates; Hard; W100+H; Singles – Doubles	(Hungary) Tímea Babos (France) Kristina Mladenovic; 6–1, 6–3	(Poland) Magdalena Fręch (Ukraine) Kateryna Volodko	(France) Carole Monnet (Slovakia) Viktória Kužmová	Diana Shnaider (Slovakia) Rebecca Šramková; Anastasia Zakharova (France) Kristina Mladenovic
December 5	Monastir, Tunisia; Hard; W25; Singles and doubles draws	(Turkey) Çağla Büyükakçay; 7–5, 0–6, 6–2	(Croatia) Lea Bošković	(China) Bai Zhuoxuan (China) Li Zongyu	(Germany) Katharina Hobgarski; Ekaterina Makarova (Spain) Eva Guerrero Álvarez; Valeria Savinykh
December 5	Monastir, Tunisia; Hard; W25; Singles and doubles draws	(Romania) Oana Gavrilă (Greece) Sapfo Sakellaridi; 6–1, 6–1	(Italy) Diletta Cherubini (Denmark) Olga Helmi	(China) Bai Zhuoxuan (China) Li Zongyu	(Germany) Katharina Hobgarski; Ekaterina Makarova (Spain) Eva Guerrero Álvarez; Valeria Savinykh
December 5	Oberpullendorf, Austria; Hard (indoor); W15; Singles and doubles draws	(Croatia) Lucija Ćirić Bagarić; 6–3, 6–0	Victoria Kan	(Czech Republic) Aneta Kučmová (Switzerland) Valentina Ryser	(Czech Republic) Denisa Hindová (United States) Vivian Wolff; Ksenia Laskutova (Canada) Mia Kupres
December 5	Oberpullendorf, Austria; Hard (indoor); W15; Singles and doubles draws	(Canada) Mia Kupres; Ksenia Laskutova; 7–5, 7–5	(Austria) Arabella Koller (Austria) Mavie Österreicher	(Czech Republic) Aneta Kučmová (Switzerland) Valentina Ryser	(Czech Republic) Denisa Hindová (United States) Vivian Wolff; Ksenia Laskutova (Canada) Mia Kupres
December 5	Sharm El Sheikh, Egypt; Hard; W15; Singles and doubles draws	(United Kingdom) Katy Dunne; 6–2, 6–2	(Egypt) Lamis Alhussein Abdel Aziz	(France) Nahia Berecoechea (Romania) Briana Szabó	(Ecuador) Camila Romero (Italy) Lara Pfeifer; Kira Pavlova (United Kingdom) Jasmine Conway
December 5	Sharm El Sheikh, Egypt; Hard; W15; Singles and doubles draws	(Chinese Taipei) Cho I-hsuan (Chinese Taipei) Cho Yi-tsen; 6–1, 6–0	(Kazakhstan) Zhanel Rustemova (Kazakhstan) Aruzhan Sagandikova	(France) Nahia Berecoechea (Romania) Briana Szabó	(Ecuador) Camila Romero (Italy) Lara Pfeifer; Kira Pavlova (United Kingdom) Jasmine Conway
December 5	Valencia, Spain; Clay; W15; Singles and doubles draws	(France) Tiantsoa Sarah Rakotomanga Rajaonah; 6–3, 4–6, 6–3	(Spain) Alba Rey García	(Spain) Marta Soriano Santiago (Bulgaria) Daria Shalamanova	(Spain) Lucía Marzal Martínez (France) Laïa Petretic (Chile) Jimar Geraldine Gerald González (Spain) Judith Perelló Saavedra
December 5	Valencia, Spain; Clay; W15; Singles and doubles draws	(Spain) Candela Aparisi (Spain) Lucía Marzal Martínez; 7–5, 6–0	(Chile) Jimar Geraldine Gerald González (Colombia) Antonia Samudio	(Spain) Marta Soriano Santiago (Bulgaria) Daria Shalamanova	(Spain) Lucía Marzal Martínez (France) Laïa Petretic (Chile) Jimar Geraldine Gerald González (Spain) Judith Perelló Saavedra
December 5	Antalya, Turkey; Clay; W15; Singles and doubles draws	Daria Lodikova vs. (Serbia) Natalija Senić; 6–4, 2–0 abandoned due to poor weather		(Turkey) İlay Yörük (Italy) Camilla Zanolini	(Serbia) Andrea Obradović; Anna Ureke; Yana Karpovich; Valeriia Olianovskaia
December 5	Antalya, Turkey; Clay; W15; Singles and doubles draws	(Croatia) Mariana Dražić (Hungary) Amarissa Kiara Tóth; 1–6, 7–5, [10–4]	(Greece) Eleni Christofi; Anna Ureke	(Turkey) İlay Yörük (Italy) Camilla Zanolini	(Serbia) Andrea Obradović; Anna Ureke; Yana Karpovich; Valeriia Olianovskaia
December 12	Solapur, India; Hard; W25; Singles and doubles draws	(Indonesia) Priska Madelyn Nugroho; 6–4, 6–2	(Finland) Anastasia Kulikova	(India) Ankita Raina; Daria Kudashova	Ekaterina Yashina (Thailand) Mananchaya Sawangkaew (Serbia) Katarina Kozarov (India) Shrivalli Bhamidipaty
December 12	Solapur, India; Hard; W25; Singles and doubles draws	(India) Ankita Raina (India) Prarthana Thombare; 6–1, 6–2	Ekaterina Yashina (Indonesia) Priska Madelyn Nugroho	(India) Ankita Raina; Daria Kudashova	Ekaterina Yashina (Thailand) Mananchaya Sawangkaew (Serbia) Katarina Kozarov (India) Shrivalli Bhamidipaty
December 12	Monastir, Tunisia; Hard; W25; Singles and doubles draws	(Germany) Silvia Ambrosio; 4–6, 6–0, 7–5	(France) Alice Robbe	(Hong Kong) Adithya Karunaratne (Germany) Alexandra Vecic	(Greece) Michaela Laki (Japan) Natsumi Kawaguchi (Italy) Diletta Cherubini; Mirra Andreeva
December 12	Monastir, Tunisia; Hard; W25; Singles and doubles draws	(Greece) Sapfo Sakellaridi (United States) Chiara Scholl; 6–3, 6–3	(United Kingdom) Emilie Lindh (Japan) Eri Shimizu	(Hong Kong) Adithya Karunaratne (Germany) Alexandra Vecic	(Greece) Michaela Laki (Japan) Natsumi Kawaguchi (Italy) Diletta Cherubini; Mirra Andreeva
December 12	Sharm El Sheikh, Egypt; Hard; W15; Singles and doubles draws	(United Kingdom) Katy Dunne; 6–3, 6–2	(France) Nahia Berecoechea	(Netherlands) Stéphanie Visscher (United Kingdom) Jasmine Conway	(Egypt) Sandra Samir (Israel) Vlada Ekshibarova (Romania) Cara Meșter (Italy) Anastasia Abbagnato
December 12	Sharm El Sheikh, Egypt; Hard; W15; Singles and doubles draws	(France) Nahia Berecoechea (Spain) Victoria Gómez; 7–6^{(7–5)}, 6–4	Kira Pavlova (Romania) Vanessa Popa Teiușanu	(Netherlands) Stéphanie Visscher (United Kingdom) Jasmine Conway	(Egypt) Sandra Samir (Israel) Vlada Ekshibarova (Romania) Cara Meșter (Italy) Anastasia Abbagnato
December 12	Wellington, New Zealand; Hard; W15; Singles and doubles draws	(New Zealand) Vivian Yang; 6–3, 6–3	(New Zealand) Jade Otway	(Australia) Mia Repac (Australia) Catherine Aulia	(Slovakia) Zuzana Zlochová (Australia) Alicia Smith (Australia) Danielle Badman (New Zealand) Kyna Decruy
December 12	Wellington, New Zealand; Hard; W15; Singles and doubles draws	(Australia) Monique Adamczak (Australia) Sophie McDonald; 4–6, 6–1, [10–6]	(Australia) Mia Repac (Australia) Alicia Smith	(Australia) Mia Repac (Australia) Catherine Aulia	(Slovakia) Zuzana Zlochová (Australia) Alicia Smith (Australia) Danielle Badman (New Zealand) Kyna Decruy
December 12	Antalya, Turkey; Clay; W15; Singles and doubles draws	(Ukraine) Anastasiya Soboleva; 6–4, 2–6, 6–3	(Hungary) Amarissa Kiara Tóth	(Serbia) Natalija Senić; Daria Lodikova	(Turkey) İlay Yörük (Netherlands) Rikke de Koning; Anna Ureke (Germany) Ann Akasha Ceuca
December 12	Antalya, Turkey; Clay; W15; Singles and doubles draws	Yana Karpovich; Daria Lodikova; 7–5, 6–2	(Croatia) Mariana Dražić (Hungary) Amarissa Kiara Tóth	(Serbia) Natalija Senić; Daria Lodikova	(Turkey) İlay Yörük (Netherlands) Rikke de Koning; Anna Ureke (Germany) Ann Akasha Ceuca
December 19	Shimadzu All Japan Indoor Tennis Championships; Kyoto, Japan; Hard (indoor); W60; Singles – Doubles	(Japan) Miyu Kato; 6–4, 2–6, 6–2	(United Kingdom) Yuriko Miyazaki	(Canada) Carol Zhao (Japan) Kyōka Okamura	(Japan) Sakura Hosogi (Thailand) Luksika Kumkhum (Japan) Momoko Kobori (United States) Sachia Vickery
December 19	Shimadzu All Japan Indoor Tennis Championships; Kyoto, Japan; Hard (indoor); W60; Singles – Doubles	(Chinese Taipei) Liang En-shuo (Chinese Taipei) Wu Fang-hsien; 2–6, 7–6^{(7–5)}, [10–2]	(Japan) Momoko Kobori (Thailand) Luksika Kumkhum	(Canada) Carol Zhao (Japan) Kyōka Okamura	(Japan) Sakura Hosogi (Thailand) Luksika Kumkhum (Japan) Momoko Kobori (United States) Sachia Vickery
December 19	Navi Mumbai, India; Hard; W25; Singles and doubles draws	Valeria Savinykh; 6–2, 7–6^{(7–4)}	(Indonesia) Priska Madelyn Nugroho	(India) Ankita Raina (Finland) Anastasia Kulikova	Daria Kudashova (India) Vaidehi Chaudhari (Latvia) Diāna Marcinkēviča (Spain) Yvonne Cavallé Reimers
December 19	Navi Mumbai, India; Hard; W25; Singles and doubles draws	(Indonesia) Priska Madelyn Nugroho; Ekaterina Yashina; 6–3, 6–1	(India) Ankita Raina (India) Prarthana Thombare	(India) Ankita Raina (Finland) Anastasia Kulikova	Daria Kudashova (India) Vaidehi Chaudhari (Latvia) Diāna Marcinkēviča (Spain) Yvonne Cavallé Reimers
December 19	Tauranga, New Zealand; Hard; W25; Singles and doubles draws	(Canada) Katherine Sebov; 6–0, 6–4	(Czech Republic) Michaela Bayerlová	(Slovakia) Zuzana Zlochová (Australia) Catherine Aulia	(New Zealand) Erin Routliffe (Australia) Alicia Smith (Kazakhstan) Anna Danilina (Japan) Yuka Hosoki
December 19	Tauranga, New Zealand; Hard; W25; Singles and doubles draws	(New Zealand) Paige Hourigan (New Zealand) Erin Routliffe; 6–1, 6–0	(India) Ashmitha Easwaramurthi (Japan) Yuka Hosoki	(Slovakia) Zuzana Zlochová (Australia) Catherine Aulia	(New Zealand) Erin Routliffe (Australia) Alicia Smith (Kazakhstan) Anna Danilina (Japan) Yuka Hosoki
December 19	Sharm El Sheikh, Egypt; Hard; W15; Singles and doubles draws	(Netherlands) Stéphanie Visscher; 4–6, 6–4, 6–4	(United Kingdom) Jasmine Conway	(Egypt) Lamis Alhussein Abdel Aziz; Nina Rudiukova	(Egypt) Sandra Samir (Ukraine) Anastasiya Lopata; Polina Pavlova (Italy) Anastasia Abbagnato
December 19	Sharm El Sheikh, Egypt; Hard; W15; Singles and doubles draws	(Italy) Anastasia Abbagnato (Egypt) Sandra Samir; Walkover	(Belgium) Tilwith Di Girolami (Netherlands) Stéphanie Visscher	(Egypt) Lamis Alhussein Abdel Aziz; Nina Rudiukova	(Egypt) Sandra Samir (Ukraine) Anastasiya Lopata; Polina Pavlova (Italy) Anastasia Abbagnato
December 19	Monastir, Tunisia; Hard; W15; Singles and doubles draws	(Greece) Sapfo Sakellaridi; 6–2, 6–2	(Italy) Arianna Zucchini	(China) Li Zongyu (Belgium) Axana Mareen	Ksenia Zaytseva (Italy) Federica Urgesi (Germany) Helena Buchwald (Italy) Elisa Andrea Camerano
December 19	Monastir, Tunisia; Hard; W15; Singles and doubles draws	(Greece) Magdalini Adaloglou (Greece) Sapfo Sakellaridi; 7–5, 6–4	(Tunisia) Chiraz Bechri; Milana Zhabrailova	(China) Li Zongyu (Belgium) Axana Mareen	Ksenia Zaytseva (Italy) Federica Urgesi (Germany) Helena Buchwald (Italy) Elisa Andrea Camerano
December 26	Gwalior, India; Hard; W15; Singles and doubles draws	(India) Vaidehi Chaudhari; 7–5, 6–4	Ksenia Laskutova	(India) Humera Baharmus (Poland) Weronika Baszak	(India) Sravya Shivani Chilakalapudi (India) Jennifer Luikham (India) Akansha Dileep Nitture (India) Sharmada Balu
December 26	Gwalior, India; Hard; W15; Singles and doubles draws	(India) Vaidehi Chaudhari; Ksenia Laskutova; 6–1, 7–6^{(7–3)}	(India) Snehal Mane (Japan) Haine Ogata	(India) Humera Baharmus (Poland) Weronika Baszak	(India) Sravya Shivani Chilakalapudi (India) Jennifer Luikham (India) Akansha Dileep Nitture (India) Sharmada Balu
December 26	Monastir, Tunisia; Hard; W15; Singles and doubles draws	(Belgium) Eliessa Vanlangendonck; 6–1, 2–0 ret.	(Morocco) Malak El Allami	(Italy) Margherita Marcon (Germany) Carolina Kuhl	(Germany) Lara Schmidt (China) Che Yujiao (France) Alyssa Reguer; Maria Kalyakina
December 26	Monastir, Tunisia; Hard; W15; Singles and doubles draws	(Greece) Magdalini Adaloglou (France) Yaroslava Bartashevich; 7–6^{(7–5)}, 6–2	(Serbia) Bojana Marinković (Belgium) Eliessa Vanlangendonck	(Italy) Margherita Marcon (Germany) Carolina Kuhl	(Germany) Lara Schmidt (China) Che Yujiao (France) Alyssa Reguer; Maria Kalyakina
