= 2022 Barranquilla Open =

Tennis tournament

- Date: 31 October–6 November 2022
- Edition: 1st
- Category: ITF Women's World Tennis Tour
- Prize money: $60,000
- Surface: Hard / Outdoor
- Location: Barranquilla, Colombia

Champions

Singles
- (Hungary) Panna Udvardy

Doubles
- (Hungary) Tímea Babos / (Ukraine) Kateryna Volodko
Barranquilla Open	· 2023 →

The 2022 Barranquilla Open is a professional tennis tournament played on outdoor hard courts. It is the first edition of the tournament which is part of the 2022 ITF Women's World Tennis Tour. It takes place in Barranquilla, Colombia between 31 October and 6 November 2022.

== Champions ==
=== Singles ===
- (Hungary) Panna Udvardy def. (Brazil) Laura Pigossi, 6–2, 7–5

=== Doubles ===
- (Hungary) Tímea Babos / (Ukraine) Kateryna Volodko def. (Brazil) Carolina Alves / (Ukraine) Valeriya Strakhova, 3–6, 7–5, [10–7]

== Singles main draw entrants ==
=== Seeds ===
Country	Player	Rank^{1}	Seed
HUN	Panna Udvardy	80	1
BRA	Laura Pigossi	103	2
HUN	Réka Luca Jani	110	3
GRE	Despina Papamichail	148	4
ARG	María Lourdes Carlé	172	5
BRA	Carolina Alves	182	6
FRA	Carole Monnet	218	7
NED	Eva Vedder	243	8
CHN	You Xiaodi	271	9
ARG	Julia Riera	277	10
GER	Lena Papadakis	285	11
BRA	Gabriela Cé	286	12
HUN	Tímea Babos	304	13
MEX	Ana Sofía Sánchez	323	14
USA	Hurricane Tyra Black	343	15
UKR	Kateryna Volodko	351	16

- ^{1} Rankings are as of 24 October 2022.

=== Other entrants ===
The following players received wildcards into the singles main draw:

- (Colombia) Yuliana Monroy
- (Brazil) Laura Pigossi
- (United States) Gabriella Price
- (Colombia) María Camila Torres Murcia
- (Colombia) Kelly Loana Vargas González

The following players received entry from the qualifying draw:

- (United States) Madison Bourguignon
- (Brazil) Ana Candiotto
- (Mexico) Lya Fernández
- (Brazil) Rebeca Pereira
- (United States) Lauren Proctor
- (United States) Kaitlin Quevedo
- (Denmark) Johanne Svendsen
- (Germany) Angelina Wirges

The following player received entry as a lucky loser:

- (Colombia) Ana María Becerra
