= 2022 Barranquilla Open – Doubles =

Doubles
- 2022 Barranquilla Open

Final
- Champions: (Hungary) Tímea Babos (Ukraine) Kateryna Volodko
- Runners-up: (Brazil) Carolina Alves (Ukraine) Valeriya Strakhova
- Score: 3–6, 7–5, [10–7]

Events
Singles	Doubles
Barranquilla Open	· 2023 →

This was the first edition of the tournament.

Tímea Babos and Kateryna Volodko won the title, defeating Carolina Alves and Valeriya Strakhova in the final, 3–6, 7–5, [10–7].

== Seeds ==
1. (Hungary) Tímea Babos / (Ukraine) Kateryna Volodko (champions)
2. (Brazil) Carolina Alves / (Ukraine) Valeriya Strakhova (final)
3. (Argentina) María Lourdes Carlé / (Greece) Despina Papamichail (quarterfinals, withdrew)
4. (Colombia) María Herazo González / (United States) Sofia Sewing (semifinals, withdrew)

== Draw ==
=== Key ===
- Q = Qualifier
- WC = Wild card
- LL = Lucky loser
- Alt = Alternate
- SE = Special exempt
- PR = Protected ranking
- ITF = ITF entry
- JE = Junior exempt
- w/o = Walkover
- r = Retired
- d = Defaulted
- SR = Special ranking

=== Draw ===
First round
1	(Hungary) T Babos (Ukraine) K Volodko	6	6
(Brazil) TG Pedretti (Bolivia) N Zeballos	4	4
WC	(Colombia) MG Mejía (Colombia) M Ramírez Correa	0	0
(Argentina) M Capurro Taborda (Netherlands) L Stevens	6	6
3	(Argentina) ML Carlé (Greece) D Papamichail	7	6
(Chile) F Labraña (Argentina) J Riera	5	4
Alt	(Germany) L Meyer auf der Heide (Germany) A Wirges	w/o
WC	(Colombia) V Carreño (Colombia) KL Vargas González
(Colombia) Y Lizarazo (Colombia) MP Pérez	4	6	[5]
(France) T Fiquet (Mexico) AS Sánchez	6	2	[10]
(Peru) R Ccuno (Brazil) R Pereira	1	5
4	(Colombia) M Herazo González (United States) S Sewing	6	7
WC	(Colombia) Y Monroy (Colombia) MC Torres Murcia	6	3	[10]
(France) C Monnet (United States) G Price	4	6	[8]
(India) R Bhatia (Germany) L Papadakis	6^{4}	6^{5}
2	(Brazil) C Alves (Ukraine) V Strakhova	7^{7}	7^{7}

Quarterfinals
1	(Hungary) T Babos (Ukraine) K Volodko	w/o
(Argentina) M Capurro Taborda (Netherlands) L Stevens
3	(Argentina) ML Carlé (Greece) D Papamichail
Alt	(Germany) L Meyer auf der Heide (Germany) A Wirges	w/o
(France) T Fiquet (Mexico) AS Sánchez	5	2
4	(Colombia) M Herazo González (United States) S Sewing	7	6
WC	(Colombia) Y Monroy (Colombia) MC Torres Murcia	3	4
2	(Brazil) C Alves (Ukraine) V Strakhova	6	6

Semifinals
1	(Hungary) T Babos (Ukraine) K Volodko	6	6
Alt	(Germany) L Meyer auf der Heide (Germany) A Wirges	3	3
4	(Colombia) M Herazo González (United States) S Sewing
2	(Brazil) C Alves (Ukraine) V Strakhova	w/o

Final
1	(Hungary) T Babos (Ukraine) K Volodko	3	7	[10]
2	(Brazil) C Alves (Ukraine) V Strakhova	6	5	[7]
