= 2022 Barranquilla Open – Singles =

Singles
- 2022 Barranquilla Open

Final
- Champion: (Hungary) Panna Udvardy
- Runner-up: (Brazil) Laura Pigossi
- Score: 6–2, 7–5

Events
Singles	Doubles
Barranquilla Open	· 2023 →

This was the first edition of the tournament.

Panna Udvardy won the title, defeating Laura Pigossi in the final, 6–2, 7–5.

== Seeds ==
All seeds receive a bye into the second round.

1. (Hungary) Panna Udvardy (champion)
2. (Brazil) Laura Pigossi (final)
3. (Hungary) Réka Luca Jani (second round)
4. (Greece) Despina Papamichail (second round)
5. (Argentina) María Lourdes Carlé (quarterfinals)
6. (Brazil) Carolina Alves (third round)
7. (France) Carole Monnet (quarterfinals, retired)
8. (Netherlands) Eva Vedder (third round)
9. (China) You Xiaodi (third round)
10. (Argentina) Julia Riera (second round)
11. (Germany) Lena Papadakis (quarterfinals)
12. (Brazil) Gabriela Cé (quarterfinals)
13. (Hungary) Tímea Babos (semifinals)
14. (Mexico) Ana Sofía Sánchez (third round)
15. (United States) Hurricane Tyra Black (second round)
16. (Ukraine) Kateryna Volodko (semifinals)

== Draw ==
=== Key ===
- Q = Qualifier
- WC = Wild card
- LL = Lucky loser
- Alt = Alternate
- SE = Special exempt
- PR = Protected ranking
- ITF = ITF entry
- JE = Junior exempt
- w/o = Walkover
- r = Retired
- d = Defaulted
- SR = Special ranking

=== Finals ===
Quarterfinals
1	(Hungary) Panna Udvardy	6	6
12	(Brazil) Gabriela Cé	1	3
13	(Hungary) Tímea Babos	7^{7}	6
11	(Germany) Lena Papadakis	6^{5}	4
5	(Argentina) María Lourdes Carlé	4	4
16	(Ukraine) Kateryna Volodko	6	6
7	(France) Carole Monnet	5	0^{r}
2/WC	(Brazil) Laura Pigossi	7	0

Semifinals
1	(Hungary) Panna Udvardy	4	6	6
13	(Hungary) Tímea Babos	6	2	2
16	(Ukraine) Kateryna Volodko	5	2
2/WC	(Brazil) Laura Pigossi	7	6

Final
1	(Hungary) Panna Udvardy	6	7
2/WC	(Brazil) Laura Pigossi	2	5

=== Top half ===
==== Section 1 ====
First round
Q	(United States) M Bourguignon	3	0
(Colombia) E Arango	6	6
(Chile) F Labraña	0	1
(Venezuela) A Gámiz	6	6
Q	(Brazil) R Pereira	4	3
(Argentina) M Capurro Taborda	6	6
LL	(Colombia) AM Becerra	0	0
WC	(Colombia) Y Monroy	6	6

Second round
1	(Hungary) P Udvardy	7^{7}	7^{7}
(Colombia) E Arango	6^{3}	6^{4}
(Venezuela) A Gámiz	6	3	1
14	(Mexico) AS Sánchez	3	6	6
12	(Brazil) G Cé	6	6
(Argentina) M Capurro Taborda	4	2
WC	(Colombia) Y Monroy	6	2	4
8	(Netherlands) E Vedder	3	6	6

Third round
1	(Hungary) P Udvardy	6	7^{7}
14	(Mexico) AS Sánchez	3	6^{4}
12	(Brazil) G Cé	7	6
8	(Netherlands) E Vedder	5	4

Quarterfinals
1	(Hungary) P Udvardy	6	6
12	(Brazil) G Cé	1	3

==== Section 2 ====
First round
WC	(Colombia) MC Torres Murcia	1	1
(United States) R Kingsley	6	6
WC	(United States) G Price	2	1
(United States) S Sewing	6	6
(Ukraine) V Strakhova	5	6	3
Q	(United States) L Proctor	7	3	6
(Argentina) B Bonardi	3	7^{7}	6
(Peru) R Ccuno	6	6^{1}	2

Second round
4	(Greece) D Papamichail	3	6	2
(United States) R Kingsley	6	3	6
(United States) S Sewing	1	1
13	(Hungary) T Babos	6	6
11	(Germany) L Papadakis	2	7	6
Q	(United States) L Proctor	6	5	4
(Argentina) B Bonardi	7	3	3
6	(Brazil) C Alves	5	6	6

Third round
(United States) R Kingsley	5	6^{5}
13	(Hungary) T Babos	7	7^{7}
11	(Germany) L Papadakis	6	6
6	(Brazil) C Alves	2	1

Quarterfinals
13	(Hungary) T Babos	7^{7}	6
11	(Germany) L Papadakis	6^{5}	4

=== Bottom half ===
==== Section 3 ====
First round
(Colombia) MP Pérez	2	6	6^{3}
Q	(Denmark) J Svendsen	6	4	7^{7}
WC	(Colombia) KL Vargas González	2	2
(Netherlands) L Stevens	6	6
(Colombia) M Herazo González	6	6
Q	(Mexico) LI Fernández Olivares	1	4
(Slovakia) V Morvayová	7^{7}	7^{7}
(India) R Bhatia	6^{0}	6^{5}

Second round
5	(Argentina) ML Carlé	6	6
Q	(Denmark) J Svendsen	3	3
(Netherlands) L Stevens	6	6
10	(Argentina) J Riera	4	4
16	(Ukraine) K Volodko	6	6
(Colombia) M Herazo González	3	2
(Slovakia) V Morvayová	6	6
3	(Hungary) RL Jani	4	4

Third round
5	(Argentina) ML Carlé	6^{4}	6	6
(Netherlands) L Stevens	7^{7}	1	2
16	(Ukraine) K Volodko	6	6
(Slovakia) V Morvayová	1	1

Quarterfinals
5	(Argentina) ML Carlé	4	4
16	(Ukraine) K Volodko	6	6

==== Section 4 ====
First round
(Bolivia) N Zeballos	6	6
Q	(Brazil) A Candiotto	2	4
(Brazil) TG Pedretti	6	6
(France) T Fiquet	1	0
Q	(United States) K Quevedo	6^{5}	3
Q	(Germany) A Wirges	7^{7}	6
(Colombia) Y Lizarazo	6	6
(Germany) L Meyer auf der Heide	2	3

Second round
7	(France) C Monnet	6	6
(Bolivia) N Zeballos	3	3
(Brazil) TG Pedretti	2	4
9	(China) X You	6	6
15	(United States) HT Black	3	4
Q	(Germany) A Wirges	6	6
(Colombia) Y Lizarazo	3	1
2/WC	(Brazil) L Pigossi	6	6

Third round
7	(France) C Monnet	7^{7}	6
9	(China) X You	6^{4}	4
Q	(Germany) A Wirges	4	1
2/WC	(Brazil) L Pigossi	6	6

Quarterfinals
7	(France) C Monnet	5	0^{r}
2/WC	(Brazil) L Pigossi	7	0
