= 2022 Shimadzu All Japan Indoor Tennis Championships – Doubles =

Doubles
- 2022 Shimadzu All Japan Indoor Tennis Championships

Final
- Champions: (Chinese Taipei) Liang En-shuo (Chinese Taipei) Wu Fang-hsien
- Runners-up: (Japan) Momoko Kobori (Thailand) Luksika Kumkhum
- Score: 2–6, 7–6^{(7–5)}, [10–2]

Events
Singles	Doubles
← 2020 ·	Shimadzu All Japan Indoor Tennis Championships	· 2023 →

Erina Hayashi and Moyuka Uchijima were the defending champions but Uchijima chose not to participate. Hayashi partnered alongside Kanako Morisaki, but lost to Momoko Kobori and Luksika Kumkhum in the semifinals.

Liang En-shuo and Wu Fang-hsien won the title, defeating Kobori and Kumkhum in the final, 2–6, 7–6^{(7–5)}, [10–2].

== Seeds ==
1. (Chinese Taipei) Hsieh Yu-chieh / (Chinese Taipei) Lee Pei-chi (first round)
2. (Chinese Taipei) Liang En-shuo / (Chinese Taipei) Wu Fang-hsien (champions)
3. (Japan) Kyōka Okamura / (Thailand) Peangtarn Plipuech (first round)
4. (South Korea) Choi Ji-hee / (Chinese Taipei) Lee Ya-hsuan (semifinals)

== Draw ==
=== Key ===
- Q = Qualifier
- WC = Wild card
- LL = Lucky loser
- Alt = Alternate
- SE = Special exempt
- PR = Protected ranking
- ITF = ITF entry
- JE = Junior exempt
- w/o = Walkover
- r = Retired
- d = Defaulted
- SR = Special ranking

=== Draw ===
First round
1	(Chinese Taipei) Y-c Hsieh (Chinese Taipei) P-c Lee	4	6^{4}
WC	(Japan) A Matsumoto (Japan) S Oshino	6	7^{7}
(Japan) E Hayashi (Japan) K Morisaki	6	7^{7}
(Japan) R Saigo (Japan) Y Saigo	2	6^{5}
3	(Japan) K Okamura (Thailand) P Plipuech	4	3
(Japan) M Kobori (Thailand) L Kumkhum	6	6
(Japan) H Kuwata (United Kingdom) Y Miyazaki	6	6
WC	(Japan) H Kawaguchi (Japan) H Shigemasu	0	2
(Japan) M Kawamura (Japan) F Kozaki	3	6^{8}
(Japan) H Arakawa (Japan) N Arakawa	6	7^{10}
(Japan) H Kaji (Japan) H Kinoshita	6	1	[4]
4	(South Korea) J-h Choi (Chinese Taipei) Y-h Lee	3	6	[10]
(Japan) J Namigata (Japan) A Omae	2	7	[9]
(Poland) U Radwańska (United States) S Vickery	6	5	[11]
WC	(Japan) S Nishimoto (Japan) M Nishio	1	2
2	(Chinese Taipei) E-s Liang (Chinese Taipei) F-h Wu	6	6

Quarterfinals
WC	(Japan) A Matsumoto (Japan) S Oshino	4	3
(Japan) E Hayashi (Japan) K Morisaki	6	6
(Japan) M Kobori (Thailand) L Kumkhum	6	4	[10]
(Japan) H Kuwata (United Kingdom) Y Miyazaki	4	6	[7]
(Japan) H Arakawa (Japan) N Arakawa	4	5
4	(South Korea) J-h Choi (Chinese Taipei) Y-h Lee	6	7
(Poland) U Radwańska (United States) S Vickery	2	1
2	(Chinese Taipei) E-s Liang (Chinese Taipei) F-h Wu	6	6

Semifinals
(Japan) E Hayashi (Japan) K Morisaki	4	6	[6]
(Japan) M Kobori (Thailand) L Kumkhum	6	2	[10]
4	(South Korea) J-h Choi (Chinese Taipei) Y-h Lee	4	1
2	(Chinese Taipei) E-s Liang (Chinese Taipei) F-h Wu	6	6

Final
(Japan) M Kobori (Thailand) L Kumkhum	6	6^{5}	[2]
2	(Chinese Taipei) E-s Liang (Chinese Taipei) F-h Wu	2	7^{7}	[10]
