= 2022 Shimadzu All Japan Indoor Tennis Championships =

Tennis tournament

- Date: 19–25 December 2022
- Edition: 3rd
- Category: ITF Women's World Tennis Tour
- Prize money: $60,000
- Surface: Hard / Indoor
- Location: Kyoto, Japan

Champions

Singles
- (Japan) Miyu Kato

Doubles
- (Chinese Taipei) Liang En-shuo / (Chinese Taipei) Wu Fang-hsien
- Shimadzu All Japan Indoor Tennis Championships

The 2022 Shimadzu All Japan Indoor Tennis Championships was a professional tennis tournament played on outdoor hard courts. It was the third edition of the tournament which was part of the 2022 ITF Women's World Tennis Tour. It took place in Kyoto, Japan between 19 and 25 December 2022.

== Champions ==
=== Singles ===
- (Japan) Miyu Kato def. (United Kingdom) Yuriko Miyazaki, 6–4, 2–6, 6–2

=== Doubles ===
- (Chinese Taipei) Liang En-shuo / (Chinese Taipei) Wu Fang-hsien def. (Japan) Momoko Kobori / (Thailand) Luksika Kumkhum, 2–6, 7–6^{(7–5)}, [10–2]

== Singles main draw entrants ==
=== Seeds ===
Country	Player	Rank^{1}	Seed
JPN	Misaki Doi	177	1
USA	Sachia Vickery	190	2
CAN	Carol Zhao	191	3
GBR	Yuriko Miyazaki	213	4
JPN	Kyōka Okamura	301	5
JPN	Sakura Hosogi	313	6
THA	Peangtarn Plipuech	321	7
THA	Luksika Kumkhum	334	8

- ^{1} Rankings are as of 12 December 2022.

=== Other entrants ===
The following players received wildcards into the singles main draw:

- (Japan) Rinko Matsuda
- (Japan) Anri Nagata
- (Japan) Akiko Omae

The following player received entry into the singles main draw using a protected ranking:

- (Japan) Ayano Shimizu

The following players received entry from the qualifying draw:

- (Japan) Miyu Kato
- (Japan) Ari Matsumoto
- (Japan) Suzuho Oshino
- (Japan) Michika Ozeki
- (Japan) Sara Saito
- (Japan) Ramu Ueda
