= 2022 Shimadzu All Japan Indoor Tennis Championships – Singles =

Singles
- 2022 Shimadzu All Japan Indoor Tennis Championships

Final
- Champion: (Japan) Miyu Kato
- Runner-up: (United Kingdom) Yuriko Miyazaki
- Score: 6–4, 2–6, 6–2

Events
Singles	Doubles
← 2020 ·	Shimadzu All Japan Indoor Tennis Championships	· 2023 →

Xun Fangying was the defending champion but chose not to participate.

Miyu Kato won the title, defeating Yuriko Miyazaki in the final, 6–4, 2–6, 6–2.

== Seeds ==
1. (Japan) Misaki Doi (second round)
2. (United States) Sachia Vickery (quarterfinals)
3. (Canada) Carol Zhao (semifinals)
4. (United Kingdom) Yuriko Miyazaki (final)
5. (Japan) Kyōka Okamura (semifinals)
6. (Japan) Sakura Hosogi (quarterfinals)
7. (Thailand) Peangtarn Plipuech (first round)
8. (Thailand) Luksika Kumkhum (quarterfinals)

== Draw ==
=== Key ===
- Q = Qualifier
- WC = Wild card
- LL = Lucky loser
- Alt = Alternate
- SE = Special exempt
- PR = Protected ranking
- ITF = ITF entry
- JE = Junior exempt
- w/o = Walkover
- r = Retired
- d = Defaulted
- SR = Special ranking

=== Finals ===
Semifinals
Q	(Japan) Miyu Kato	6	6
3	(Canada) Carol Zhao	4	4
4	(United Kingdom) Yuriko Miyazaki	1	6	6
5	(Japan) Kyōka Okamura	6	4	2

Final
Q	(Japan) Miyu Kato	6	2	6
4	(United Kingdom) Yuriko Miyazaki	4	6	2

=== Top half ===
First round
1	(Japan) M Doi	6	6
(Japan) E Hayashi	1	3
WC	(Japan) A Omae	2	2
Q	(Japan) M Kato	6	6
WC	(Japan) A Nagata	1	4
(Poland) U Radwańska	6	6
(Japan) N Hanatani	1	5
6	(Japan) S Hosogi	6	7
3	(Canada) C Zhao	7	3	6
(Japan) H Kuwata	5	6	2
Q	(Japan) R Ueda	6	6
(Japan) R Saigo	0	1
Q	(Japan) S Saito	6	4	6
Q	(Japan) S Oshino	2	6	2
(Chinese Taipei) P-c Lee	1	1
8	(Thailand) L Kumkhum	6	6

Second round
1	(Japan) M Doi	4	6	4
Q	(Japan) M Kato	6	3	6
(Poland) U Radwańska	3	4
6	(Japan) S Hosogi	6	6
3	(Canada) C Zhao	6	6
Q	(Japan) R Ueda	0	4
Q	(Japan) S Saito	1	6	4
8	(Thailand) L Kumkhum	6	3	6

Quarterfinals
Q	(Japan) M Kato	6	6
6	(Japan) S Hosogi	3	2
3	(Canada) C Zhao	6	7^{7}
8	(Thailand) L Kumkhum	2	6^{2}

Semifinals
Q	(Japan) M Kato	6	6
3	(Canada) C Zhao	4	4

=== Bottom half ===
First round
7	(Thailand) P Plipuech	2	7	4
(Japan) M Kobori	6	5	6
WC	(Japan) R Matsuda	2	4
(Japan) H Arakawa	6	6
(Japan) E Sema	5	3
(South Korea) J-h Choi	7	6
(Japan) H Kaji	6	3	1
4	(United Kingdom) Y Miyazaki	3	6	6
5	(Japan) K Okamura	6	6
Q	(Japan) A Matsumoto	2	4
(Chinese Taipei) Y-h Lee	5	4
(Japan) N Sato	7	6
(Chinese Taipei) E-s Liang	6	6
PR	(Japan) A Shimizu	1	2
Q	(Japan) M Ozeki	5	1
2	(United States) S Vickery	7	6

Second round
(Japan) M Kobori	7	6
(Japan) H Arakawa	5	3
(South Korea) J-h Choi	0	4
4	(United Kingdom) Y Miyazaki	6	6
5	(Japan) K Okamura	7^{10}	7
(Japan) N Sato	6^{8}	5
(Chinese Taipei) E-s Liang	4	2
2	(United States) S Vickery	6	6

Quarterfinals
(Japan) M Kobori	6	4	3
4	(United Kingdom) Y Miyazaki	2	6	6
5	(Japan) K Okamura	6	6^{5}	6
2	(United States) S Vickery	4	7^{7}	4

Semifinals
4	(United Kingdom) Y Miyazaki	1	6	6
5	(Japan) K Okamura	6	4	2
