= Yuliana Monroy =

Colombian tennis player (born 1998)

- Country (sports): Colombia
- Born: 20 September 1998 (age 27)
- Plays: Right (two-handed backhand)
- Prize money: $44,543

Singles
- Career record: 78–101
- Career titles: 0
- Highest ranking: No. 619 (9 October 2023)

Doubles
- Career record: 45–71
- Career titles: 0
- Highest ranking: No. 516 (9 December 2024)
- Last updated on: 6 June 2026.

Yuliana Monroy (born 20 September 1998) is a Colombian inactive tennis player.

Monroy has a career-high singles ranking by the Women's Tennis Association (WTA) of 619, achieved on 9 October 2023. She also has a career-high doubles ranking of 516, achieved on 9 December 2024.

Monroy made her WTA Tour debut at the 2022 Copa Colsanitas, where she was given a wildcard into the singles main draw, losing there to Ekaterine Gorgodze in the first round.

== ITF Circuit finals ==
=== Singles: 2 (2 runner-ups) ===
Legend W15 tournaments	Finals by surface Hard (0–2)

Result	W–L	Date	Tournament	Tier	Surface	Opponent	Score
Loss	0–1	Dec 2021	ITF Cancún, Mexico	W15	Hard	(Canada) Stacey Fung	2–6, 3–6
Loss	0–2	Oct 2024	ITF Huamantla, Mexico	W15	Hard	(United States) Malaika Rapolu	6–7, 2–6

=== Doubles: 1 (runner-up) ===
Legend W35 tournaments	Finals by surface Hard (0–1)

Result	W–L	Date	Tournament	Tier	Surface	Partner	Opponents	Score
Loss	0–1	Nov 2024	ITF Santo Domingo, Dominican Republic	W35	Hard	(United States) Kolie Allen	(United States) Haley Giavara (Japan) Hiroko Kuwata	7–5, 4–6, [6–10]
