= María Torres Murcia =

Colombian tennis player (born 2002)

- Full name: María Camila Torres Murcia
- Country (sports): Colombia
- Born: 10 November 2002 (age 23) Neiva, Huila, Colombia
- Plays: Left-handed (two-handed backhand)
- Prize money: US$28,657

Singles
- Career record: 52–76
- Highest ranking: No. 807 (11 September 2023)
- Current ranking: No. 881 (21 July 2025)

Doubles
- Career record: 35–55
- Highest ranking: No. 572 (16 October 2023)
- Current ranking: No. 1,601 (21 July 2025)
Medal record
Representing Colombia
Women's tennis
Central American and Caribbean Games
Silver medal – second place	2026 Santo Domingo	Nations cup
- Last updated on: 21 July 2025.

María Camila Torres Murcia (born 10 November 2002) is a Colombian professional tennis player.

== Early life ==
Torres Murcia was born in Neiva, Huila, to Francisco Torres and Johanna Murcia. She began playing tennis at the age of eight.

== Junior career ==
In September 2017, she and Lína Sáchica won the doubles title at the J5 Copa Pereira, defeating Gabriela Giraldo and Gabriela Macías in the final. In July 2019, she and Jazmín Ortenzi won the doubles title at the J5 Copa Ciudad de Medellín.

== Professional career ==
In September 2021, she and Romina Ccuno won the doubles title at the W15 Ibagué Destino Deporte, defeating Alica Rusová and Antonia Samudio in the final. In November 2022, she and Ccuno reached the doubles final of the W15 Copa Federación in Lima, but lost to Anastasia Iamachkine and Lucciana Pérez Alarcón. She represented Huila at the 2023 National Games of Colombia.

In April 2025, she made her WTA Tour debut with a wildcard into the Copa Colsanitas, but lost to Emina Bektas in the first round.

== ITF Circuit finals ==
=== Doubles: 3 (2 titles, 1 runner-up) ===
Legend W15 tournaments (2–1)	Finals by surface Hard (1–0) Clay(1–1)

Result	W–L	Date	Tournament	Tier	Surface	Partner	Opponents	Score
Win	1–0	Sep 2021	ITF Ibagué, Colombia	W15	Clay	(Peru) Romina Ccuno	(Slovakia) Alica Rusová (Colombia) Antonia Samudio	3–6, 6–4, [10–5]
Loss	1–1	Nov 2022	ITF Lima, Peru	W15	Clay	(Peru) Romina Ccuno	(Peru) Anastasia Iamachkine (Peru) Lucciana Pérez Alarcón	2–6, 4–6
Win	2–1	Jul 2025	ITF Huamantla, Mexico	W15	Hard	(United States) Kianah Motosono	(United States) Dalayna Hewitt (United States) Dasha Ivanova	6–4, 6–4
