= 2024 Barranquilla Open =

- Date: 12–17 August 2024
- Edition: 3rd
- Category: WTA 125
- Prize money: $115,000
- Surface: Hard / Outdoor
- Location: Barranquilla, Colombia

Champions

Singles
- (Argentina) Nadia Podoroska

Doubles
- (United States) Jessica Failla / (Japan) Hiroko Kuwata
- Barranquilla Open

The 2024 Barranquilla Open was a professional women's tennis tournament played on outdoor hard courts. It was the third edition of the tournament, which was also part of the 2024 WTA 125 tournaments and second as a WTA 125 event. It took place in Barranquilla, Colombia between 12 and 17 August 2024.

== Singles main draw entrants ==
=== Seeds ===
Country	Player	Rank^{1}	Seed
GER	Tatjana Maria	67	1
BEL	Greet Minnen	74	2
ARG	María Lourdes Carlé	86	3
ARG	Nadia Podoroska	87	4
USA	Emina Bektas	117	5
NED	Suzan Lamens	122	6
COL	Emiliana Arango	131	7
FRA	Elsa Jacquemot	139	8

- ^{1} Rankings are as of 5 August 2024.

=== Other entrants ===
The following players received wildcards into the singles main draw:

- (Colombia) María Herazo González
- (Colombia) María Paulina Pérez
- (Argentina) Nadia Podoroska

The following players received entry from the qualifying draw:

- (United States) Jessica Failla
- (Israel) Lina Glushko
- (Chinese Taipei) Liang En-shuo
- (Slovakia) Martina Okáľová

== Doubles main-draw entrants ==
=== Seeds ===
Country	Player	Country	Player	Rank^{1}	Seed
USA	Quinn Gleason	BRA	Ingrid Martins	211	1
AUS	Destanee Aiava	GRE	Despina Papamichail	243	2

- ^{1} Rankings are as of 5 August 2024.

=== Other entry information ===
The following pair received a wildcard into the doubles main draw:

- (Colombia) Ana Becerra / (United States) Varvara Lepchenko

The following pair received entry as alternates:

- (United States) Jessica Failla / (Japan) Hiroko Kuwata

=== Withdrawals ===
- (Israel) Lina Glushko / (United States) Madison Sieg → replaced by (United States) Jessica Failla / (Japan) Hiroko Kuwata

== Champions ==
=== Singles ===
- (Argentina) Nadia Podoroska def. (Germany) Tatjana Maria, 6–2, 1–6, 6–3

=== Doubles ===
- (United States) Jessica Failla / (Japan) Hiroko Kuwata def. (United States) Quinn Gleason / (Brazil) Ingrid Martins 4–6, 7–6^{(7–2)}, [10–7]
