= 2023 Barranquilla Open =

- Date: 14–19 August 2023
- Edition: 2nd
- Category: WTA 125
- Prize money: $115,000
- Surface: Hard / Outdoor
- Location: Barranquilla, Colombia

Champions

Singles
- (Germany) Tatjana Maria

Doubles
- (Greece) Valentini Grammatikopoulou / (Greece) Despina Papamichail
- Barranquilla Open

The 2023 Barranquilla Open was a professional tennis tournament played on outdoor hard courts. It was the second edition of the tournament and first ever as a WTA 125 event which was also part of the 2023 WTA 125 tournaments. It took place in Barranquilla, Colombia between 14 and 19 August 2023.

== Singles main draw entrants ==
=== Seeds ===
| Country | Player | Rank^{1} | Seed |
|---|---|---|---|
| GER | Tatjana Maria | 56 | 1 |
| SVK | Anna Karolína Schmiedlová | 73 | 2 |
| USA | Caroline Dolehide | 108 | 3 |
| ESP | Aliona Bolsova | 116 | 4 |
| HUN | Panna Udvardy | 126 | 5 |
| SUI | Simona Waltert | 134 | 6 |
| ARG | Julia Riera | 141 | 7 |
| BRA | Laura Pigossi | 144 | 8 |

- ^{1} Rankings are as of 7 August 2023.

=== Other entrants ===
The following players received wildcards into the singles main draw:

- (Colombia) María Herazo González
- (Germany) Sabine Lisicki
- (Colombia) Yuliana Monroy
- (Colombia) María Paulina Pérez García

The following players received entry from the qualifying draw:

- (Germany) Jasmin Jebawy
- (Serbia) Katarina Kozarov
- (United States) Varvara Lepchenko
- (United States) Alana Smith

== Doubles main-draw entrants ==
=== Seeds ===
| Country | Player | Country | Player | Rank^{1} | Seed |
|---|---|---|---|---|---|
| | Yana Sizikova | BEL | Kimberley Zimmermann | 106 | 1 |
| ESP | Aliona Bolsova | | Irina Khromacheva | 154 | 2 |

- ^{1} Rankings are as of 7 August 2023.

=== Other entry information ===
The following pair received a wildcard into the doubles main draw:

- (Colombia) María Herazo González / (France) Amandine Hesse

== Champions ==
=== Singles ===
- (Germany) Tatjana Maria def. (France) Fiona Ferro 6–1, 6–2

=== Doubles ===
- (Greece) Valentini Grammatikopoulou / (Greece) Despina Papamichail def. (Colombia) Yuliana Lizarazo / (Colombia) María Paulina Pérez García 7–6^{(7–2)}, 7–5
