= 2026 Barranquilla Open =

- Date: 7–13 September 2026
- Edition: 4th
- Category: WTA 125
- Prize money: $115,000
- Surface: Hard / Outdoor
- Location: Barranquilla, Colombia

Champions

Singles
- (United States) Claire Liu

Doubles
- (United States) Rasheeda McAdoo / (United States) Anna Rogers
- Barranquilla Open

The 2026 Barranquilla Open, also known as the Kia Open for sponsorship reasons, was a professional women's tennis tournament played on outdoor hard courts. It was the fourth edition of the tournament and part of the WTA 125 series. It took place in Barranquilla, Colombia, from 7 to 13 September 2026.

== Singles main draw entrants ==
=== Seeds ===
| Country | Player | Rank^{1} | Seed |
|---|---|---|---|
| COL | Emiliana Arango | 88 | 1 |
| | Anna Blinkova | 95 | 2 |
| ESP | Kaitlin Quevedo | 107 | 3 |
| LAT | Darja Semeņistaja | 109 | 4 |
| USA | Claire Liu | 111 | 5 |
| USA | Kayla Day | 117 | 6 |
| CZE | Dominika Šalková | 118 | 7 |
| ~~ITA~~ | ~~Lucrezia Stefanini~~ | ~~119~~ | ~~8~~ |

- ^{1} Rankings as of 31 August 2026.

=== Other entrants ===
The following players received wildcards into the singles main draw:

- (Colombia) Emanuela Lares
- (Colombia) Valentina Mediorreal Arias
- (Colombia) María Paulina Pérez García
- (Colombia) María Torres Murcia

The following players received entry into the singles main draw through protected ranking:

- (Argentina) Nadia Podoroska

The following players received entry from the qualifying draw:

- (Brazil) Carolina Alves
- (France) Elsa Jacquemot
- (Japan) Ena Koike
- (United States) Anna Rogers

The following player received entry as a lucky loser:

- (Australia) Lizette Cabrera

=== Withdrawals ===
Before the tournament

- (United Kingdom) Harriet Dart → replaced by (Canada) Cadence Brace
- (Argentina) Luisina Giovannini → replaced by (United States) Katrina Scott
- (Andorra) Victoria Jiménez Kasintseva → replaced by (Spain) Sara Sorribes Tormo
- (United States) Elvina Kalieva → replaced by (United States) Julieta Pareja
- (Germany) Tatjana Maria → replaced by (Japan) Nao Hibino
- (Italy) Lisa Pigato → replaced by Anastasia Tikhonova
- (Italy) Lucrezia Stefanini → replaced by (Australia) Lizette Cabrera [LL]
- (Switzerland) Jil Teichmann → replaced by (United States) Varvara Lepchenko
- (Czech Republic) Tereza Valentová → replaced by (Czech Republic) Vendula Valdmannová
- (China) Yuan Yue → replaced by (China) You Xiaodi

== Doubles main-draw entrants ==
=== Seeds ===
| Country | Player | Country | Player | Rank^{1} | Seed |
|---|---|---|---|---|---|
| UKR | Valeriya Strakhova | | Anastasia Tikhonova | 167 | 1 |
| USA | Dalayna Hewitt | USA | Alana Smith | 197 | 2 |

- ^{1} Rankings are as of 31 August 2026.

=== Other entry information ===
The following pair received a wildcard into the doubles main draw:

- (Colombia) Valentina Mediorreal Arias / (Colombia) María Paulina Pérez García

== Champions ==
=== Singles ===
- (United States) Claire Liu def. Anna Blinkova 6–0, 2–6, 7–5

=== Doubles ===
- (United States) Rasheeda McAdoo / (United States) Anna Rogers def. (United States) Dalayna Hewitt / (United States) Alana Smith, 7–6^{(7–3)}, 6–3
