= 2006 Fed Cup World Group play-offs =

Part of tennis tournament

The World Group play-offs were four ties which involved the losing nations of the World Group first round and the winning nations of the World Group II. Nations that won their play-off ties entered the 2007 World Group, while losing nations joined the 2007 World Group II.

== Japan vs. Austria ==
Japan
5
Ariake Coliseum, Tokyo, Japan
15–16 July 2006
Decoturf (indoors)

Austria
0

			1	2	3
1	(Japan) (Austria)	Akiko Morigami; Barbara Schwartz	7^{7} 6^{3}	6; 0
2	(Japan) (Austria)	Ai Sugiyama; Melanie Klaffner	7; 5	6; 1
3	(Japan) (Austria)	Aiko Nakamura; Barbara Schwartz	6; 2	7; 5
4	(Japan) (Austria)	Akiko Morigami; Nikola Hofmanova	6; 2	6; 3
5	(Japan) (Austria)	Shinobu Asagoe / Ai Sugiyama; Melanie Klaffner / Barbara Schwartz	6; 3	1; 6	6; 1

== France vs. Czech Republic ==
France
3
US Cagnes Tennis, Cagnes-sur-Mer, France
15–16 July 2006
Red clay (outdoors)

Czech Republic
2

			1	2	3
1	(France) (Czech Republic)	Tatiana Golovin; Nicole Vaidišová	1; 6	6; 3	9; 11
2	(France) (Czech Republic)	Nathalie Dechy; Lucie Šafářová	5; 7	6; 3	9; 7
3	(France) (Czech Republic)	Nathalie Dechy; Nicole Vaidišová	2; 6	3; 6
4	(France) (Czech Republic)	Tatiana Golovin; Lucie Šafářová	6; 2	6; 1
5	(France) (Czech Republic)	Séverine Brémond / Tatiana Golovin; Iveta Benešová / Květa Peschke	6; 4	7^{7} 6^{2}

== China vs. Germany ==
China
4
Beijing Tennis Center, Beijing, China
15–16 July 2006
Rebound Ace (indoors)

Germany
1

			1	2	3
1	(China) (Germany)	Li Na; Kristina Barrois	6; 3	6; 4
2	(China) (Germany)	Zheng Jie; Kathrin Wörle	6; 4	7; 5
3	(China) (Germany)	Li Na; Kathrin Wörle	7; 5	7; 5
4	(China) (Germany)	Sun Tiantian; Tatjana Malek	6; 4	3; 6	3; 6
5	(China) (Germany)	Yan Zi / Zheng Jie; Kristina Barrois / Jasmin Wöhr	6; 3	6; 4

== Croatia vs. Russia ==
Croatia
2
ITC Stella Maris, Umag, Croatia
15–16 July 2006
Red clay (outdoors)

Russia
3

			1	2	3
1	(Croatia) (Russia)	Ivana Lisjak; Anna Chakvetadze	6^{2} 7^{7}	6^{3} 7^{7}
2	(Croatia) (Russia)	Sanja Ančić; Elena Dementieva	3; 6	5; 7
3	(Croatia) (Russia)	Karolina Šprem; Elena Dementieva	1; 6	3; 6
4	(Croatia) (Russia)	Sanja Ančić; Vera Dushevina	7^{7} 6^{5}	6; 2
5	(Croatia) (Russia)	Ivana Lisjak / Matea Mezak; Anna Chakvetadze / Elena Vesnina	3; 6	7^{7} 6^{3}	6; 2

== See also ==
- Fed Cup structure
