= 2023 Barranquilla Open – Doubles =

Doubles
- 2023 Barranquilla Open

Final
- Champions: (Greece) Valentini Grammatikopoulou (Greece) Despina Papamichail
- Runners-up: (Colombia) Yuliana Lizarazo (Colombia) María Paulina Pérez García
- Score: 7–6^{(7–2)}, 7–5

Events
Singles	Doubles
← 2022 ·	Barranquilla Open	· 2024 →

Tímea Babos and Kateryna Volodko were the reigning champions from 2022, when the tournament was an ITF event, but did not participate this year.

Valentini Grammatikopoulou and Despina Papamichail won the title, defeating Yuliana Lizarazo and María Paulina Pérez García in the final, 7–6^{(7–2)}, 7–5.

== Seeds ==
1. Yana Sizikova / (Belgium) Kimberley Zimmermann (quarterfinals)
2. (Spain) Aliona Bolsova / Irina Khromacheva (quarterfinals)

== Draw ==
=== Key ===
- Q = Qualifier
- WC = Wild card
- LL = Lucky loser
- Alt = Alternate
- SE = Special exempt
- PR = Protected ranking
- ITF = ITF entry
- JE = Junior exempt
- w/o = Walkover
- r = Retired
- d = Defaulted
- SR = Special ranking

=== Draw ===
Quarterfinals
1	Y Sizikova (Belgium) K Zimmermann	3	7	[7]
(Serbia) N Stevanović (Hungary) P Udvardy	6	5	[10]
(Greece) V Grammatikopoulou (Greece) D Papamichail	6	6
WC	(Colombia) M Herazo González (France) A Hesse	3	4
(France) E Jacquemot (France) C Monnet	6	3	[10]
(United States) C Rosca (United States) S Sewing	1	6	[6]
(Colombia) Y Lizarazo (Colombia) MP Pérez García	2	6	[10]
2	(Spain) A Bolsova; I Khromacheva	6	4	[3]

Semifinals
(Serbia) N Stevanović (Hungary) P Udvardy	4	4
(Greece) V Grammatikopoulou (Greece) D Papamichail	6	6
(France) E Jacquemot (France) C Monnet	5	1
(Colombia) Y Lizarazo (Colombia) MP Pérez García	7	6

Final
(Greece) V Grammatikopoulou (Greece) D Papamichail	7^{7}	7
(Colombia) Y Lizarazo (Colombia) MP Pérez García	6^{2}	5
