= 2023 Barranquilla Open – Singles =

Singles
- 2023 Barranquilla Open

Final
- Champion: (Germany) Tatjana Maria
- Runner-up: (France) Fiona Ferro
- Score: 6–1, 6–2

Events
Singles	Doubles
← 2022 ·	Barranquilla Open	· 2024 →

Tatjana Maria won the singles title at the 2023 Barranquilla Open, defeating Fiona Ferro in the final, 6–1, 6–2.

Panna Udvardy was the defending champion from 2022, when the tournament was an ITF event, but lost in the first round to wildcard María Herazo González.

== Seeds ==
1. (Germany) Tatjana Maria (champion)
2. (Slovakia) Anna Karolína Schmiedlová (semifinals)
3. (United States) Caroline Dolehide (second round)
4. (Spain) Aliona Bolsova (first round)
5. (Hungary) Panna Udvardy (first round)
6. (Switzerland) Simona Waltert (first round)
7. (Argentina) Julia Riera (first round)
8. (Brazil) Laura Pigossi (quarterfinals)

== Draw ==
=== Key ===
- Q = Qualifier
- WC = Wild card
- LL = Lucky loser
- Alt = Alternate
- SE = Special exempt
- PR = Protected ranking
- ITF = ITF entry
- JE = Junior exempt
- w/o = Walkover
- r = Retired
- d = Defaulted
- SR = Special ranking

=== Finals ===
Semifinals
1	(Germany) Tatjana Maria	6	6
Q	(United States) Varvara Lepchenko	0	2
(France) Fiona Ferro	4	6	6
2	(Slovakia) Anna Karolína Schmiedlová	6	4	2

Final
1	(Germany) Tatjana Maria	6	6
(France) Fiona Ferro	1	2

=== Top half ===
First round
1	(Germany) T Maria	6	6
(Argentina) M Capurro Taborda	1	1
Q	(Serbia) K Kozarov	3	2
(Greece) V Grammatikopoulou	6	6
(Australia) D Saville	4
Q	(Germany) J Jebawy	2^{r}
WC	(Germany) S Lisicki	7	7^{7}
6	(Switzerland) S Waltert	5	6^{5}
3	(United States) C Dolehide	7^{7}	6
Q	(United States) A Smith	6^{2}	3
Q	(United States) V Lepchenko	6	6
(Hungary) T Babos	1	4
(France) L Jeanjean	6	6
(Greece) D Papamichail	4	3
(France) C Monnet	6	6
7	(Argentina) J Riera	3	2

Second round
1	(Germany) T Maria	6	6
(Greece) V Grammatikopoulou	0	2
(Australia) D Saville	w/o
WC	(Germany) S Lisicki
3	(United States) C Dolehide	3	4
Q	(United States) V Lepchenko	6	6
(France) L Jeanjean	2	2
(France) C Monnet	6	6

Quarterfinals
1	(Germany) T Maria	6	6
(Australia) D Saville	3	2
Q	(United States) V Lepchenko	6	6
(France) C Monnet	2	4

Semifinals
1	(Germany) T Maria	6	6
Q	(United States) V Lepchenko	0	2

=== Bottom half ===
First round
5	(Hungary) P Udvardy	5	3
WC	(Colombia) M Herazo González	7	6
(Romania) I Fetecău	1	6	4
(Cyprus) R Șerban	6	4	1^{r}
(France) E Jacquemot	6	6
(France) H Tan	4	4
(France) F Ferro	6	6
4	(Spain) A Bolsova	2	1
8	(Brazil) L Pigossi	6	6
(France) A Hesse	2	1
(United States) K Scott	6	4	4
(France) K Mladenovic	1	6	6
(Colombia) E Arango	6	6
WC	(Colombia) Y Monroy	2	1
WC	(Colombia) MP Pérez García	6	6^{4}	3
2	(Slovakia) AK Schmiedlová	4	7^{7}	6

Second round
WC	(Colombia) M Herazo González	6	2	3
(Romania) I Fetecău	3	6	6
(France) E Jacquemot	3	6	3
(France) F Ferro	6	4	6
8	(Brazil) L Pigossi	6	1
(France) K Mladenovic	2	0^{r}
(Colombia) E Arango	0	2
2	(Slovakia) AK Schmiedlová	6	6

Quarterfinals
(Romania) I Fetecău	4	0
(France) F Ferro	6	6
8	(Brazil) L Pigossi	3	6	2
2	(Slovakia) AK Schmiedlová	6	2	6

Semifinals
(France) F Ferro	4	6	6
2	(Slovakia) AK Schmiedlová	6	4	2

== Qualifying ==
=== Seeds ===
1. (Serbia) Katarina Kozarov (qualified)
2. Irina Khromacheva (qualifying competition)
3. (United States) Alana Smith (qualified)
4. (Germany) Jasmin Jebawy (qualified)

=== Qualifiers ===
1. (Serbia) Katarina Kozarov
2. (United States) Varvara Lepchenko
3. (United States) Alana Smith
4. (Germany) Jasmin Jebawy

=== Qualifying draw ===
==== First qualifier ====
Qualifying competition
1	(Serbia) Katarina Kozarov	6	7
	(Colombia) Yuliana Lizarazo	2	5

==== Second qualifier ====
Qualifying competition
2	Irina Khromacheva	1	4
	(United States) Varvara Lepchenko	6	6

==== Third qualifier ====
Qualifying competition
3	(United States) Alana Smith	6	6
	(United States) Amy Zhu	4	0

==== Fourth qualifier ====
Qualifying competition
4	(Germany) Jasmin Jebawy	6	1	6
	(Colombia) María Torres Murcia	2	6	0
