= 2006 Fed Cup World Group II play-offs =

Part of tennis tournament

The 2006 World Group II play-offs were four ties which involved the losing nations of the World Group II and four nations from the three Zonal Group I competitions. Nations that won their play-off ties entered the 2007 World Group II, while losing nations joined their respective zonal groups.

== Israel vs. Indonesia ==
Indonesia was scheduled to play against Israel on 15–16 July in Ramat HaSharon, but the Indonesians withdrew in protest to the violence that occurred in the Gaza Strip at that time of the year. Israel thus progressed to the 2007 World Group II, while Indonesia was relegated back down to Zonal Competition.

== Canada vs. Argentina ==
Canada
3
The Royal Glenora Club, Edmonton, Canada
15–16 July 2006
Plexipave (outdoors)

Argentina
2

			1	2	3
1	(Canada) (Argentina)	Stéphanie Dubois; Gisela Dulko	4; 6	3; 6
2	(Canada) (Argentina)	Aleksandra Wozniak; Mariana Díaz Oliva	6; 2	6; 4
3	(Canada) (Argentina)	Aleksandra Wozniak; Gisela Dulko	7^{8} 6^{6}	6; 3
4	(Canada) (Argentina)	Stéphanie Dubois; Clarisa Fernández	6; 2	6; 4
5	(Canada) (Argentina)	Sharon Fichman / Marie-Ève Pelletier; Gisela Dulko / Mariana Díaz Oliva	5; 7	4; 6

== Slovakia vs. Thailand ==
Slovakia
5
Sibamac Arena, Bratislava, Slovakia
15–16 July 2006
Premier hard (indoors)

Thailand
0

			1	2	3
1	(Slovakia) (Thailand)	Daniela Hantuchová; Montinee Tangphong	6; 1	6; 1
2	(Slovakia) (Thailand)	Magdaléna Rybáriková; Suchanun Viratprasert	6; 3	6; 3
3	(Slovakia) (Thailand)	Daniela Hantuchová; Suchanun Viratprasert	6; 1	6; 3
4	(Slovakia) (Thailand)	Dominika Cibulková; Montinee Tangphong	6; 3	6; 1
5	(Slovakia) (Thailand)	Janette Husárová / Magdaléna Rybáriková; Nudnida Luangnam / Thassha Vitayaviroj	6; 2	6; 3

== Switzerland vs. Australia ==
Switzerland
0
TC Chavannes-de-Bogis, Chavannes-de-Bogis, Switzerland
15–16 July 2006
Greenset hard (outdoors)

Australia
5

			1	2	3
1	(Switzerland) (Australia)	Nicole Riner; Samantha Stosur	1; 6	2; 6
2	(Switzerland) (Australia)	Timea Bacsinszky; Nicole Pratt	2; 6	5; 7
3	(Switzerland) (Australia)	Timea Bacsinszky; Samantha Stosur	4; 6	2; 6
4	(Switzerland) (Australia)	Stefanie Vögele; Alicia Molik	2; 6	6; 3	0; 6
5	(Switzerland) (Australia)	Timea Bacsinszky / Stefania Boffa; Alicia Molik / Rennae Stubbs	1; 6	2; 6

== See also ==
- Fed Cup structure
