= 2007 Fed Cup World Group play-offs =

Part of tennis tournament

The World Group play-offs were four ties which involved the losing nations of the World Group first round and the winning nations of the World Group II. Nations that won their play-off ties entered the 2008 World Group, while losing nations joined the 2008 World Group II.

== Austria vs. Israel ==
Austria
1
ATZ Linz, Linz, Austria
14–15 July 2007
Red clay (outdoors)

Israel
4

			1	2	3
1	(Austria) (Israel)	Tamira Paszek; Shahar Pe'er	4; 6	4; 6
2	(Austria) (Israel)	Yvonne Meusburger; Tzipora Obziler	3; 6	1; 6
3	(Austria) (Israel)	Yvonne Meusburger; Shahar Pe'er	3; 6	1; 6
4	(Austria) (Israel)	Melanie Klaffner; Julia Glushko	6; 4	6; 3
5	(Austria) (Israel)	Melanie Klaffner / Tamira Paszek; Tzipora Obziler / Shahar Pe'er	3; 6	1; 6

== Belgium vs. China ==
Belgium
1
Knokke Zoute Tennisclub, Knokke-Heist, Belgium
14–15 July 2007
Red clay (outdoors)

China
4

			1	2	3
1	(Belgium) (China)	Debbrich Feys; Sun Tiantian	4; 6	2; 6
2	(Belgium) (China)	Yanina Wickmayer; Yan Zi	7; 5	7^{9} 6^{7}
3	(Belgium) (China)	Yanina Wickmayer; Sun Tiantian	4; 6	3; 6
4	(Belgium) (China)	Tamaryn Hendler; Yan Zi	6^{3} 7^{7}	6; 2	6; 8
5	(Belgium) (China)	Debbrich Feys / Aude Vermoezen; Ji Chunmei / Sun Shengnan	2; 6	1; 6

== Japan vs. Germany ==
Japan
2
Sky Hall Toyota, Toyota, Aichi, Japan
14–15 July 2007
Taraflex (indoors)

Germany
3

			1	2	3
1	(Japan) (Germany)	Erika Takao; Tatjana Malek	4; 6	3; 6
2	(Japan) (Germany)	Ayumi Morita; Angelique Kerber	4; 6	6; 4	7; 5
3	(Japan) (Germany)	Erika Takao; Angelique Kerber	6; 3	6; 2
4	(Japan) (Germany)	Ayumi Morita; Tatjana Malek	4; 6	3; 6
5	(Japan) (Germany)	Rika Fujiwara / Tomoko Yonemura; Anna-Lena Grönefeld / Tatjana Malek	3; 6	4; 6

== Spain vs. Czech Republic ==
Spain
4
Club de Tenis Llafranc, Palafrugell, Spain
14–15 July 2007
Red clay (outdoors)

Czech Republic
1

			1	2	3
1	(Spain) (Czech Republic)	Anabel Medina Garrigues; Iveta Benešová	7^{9} 6^{7}	2; 6	6; 1
2	(Spain) (Czech Republic)	Nuria Llagostera Vives; Lucie Šafářová	1; 6	2; 6
3	(Spain) (Czech Republic)	Anabel Medina Garrigues; Lucie Šafářová	6; 3	6; 2
4	(Spain) (Czech Republic)	Lourdes Domínguez Lino; Iveta Benešová	6; 2	4; 6	6; 3
5	(Spain) (Czech Republic)	Nuria Llagostera Vives / Virginia Ruano Pascual; Petra Kvitová / Barbora Záhlavová-Strýcová	6; 4	6; 1

== See also ==
- Fed Cup structure
