= 2026 Barranquilla Open – Doubles =

Doubles
- 2026 Barranquilla Open

Final
- Champions: (United States) Rasheeda McAdoo (United States) Anna Rogers
- Runners-up: (United States) Dalayna Hewitt (United States) Alana Smith
- Score: 7–6^{(7–3)}, 6–3

Events
Singles	Doubles
- Barranquilla Open

Rasheeda McAdoo and Anna Rogers won the title, defeating Dalayna Hewitt and Alana Smith in the final, 7–6^{(7–3)}, 6–3.

Jessica Failla and Hiroko Kuwata were the defending champions when the tournament was last held in 2024, but did not participate.

== Seeds ==
1. (Ukraine) Valeriya Strakhova / Anastasia Tikhonova (semifinals, withdrew)
2. (United States) Dalayna Hewitt / (United States) Alana Smith (final)

== Draw ==
Key

- Q = Qualifier
- WC = Wild card
- LL = Lucky loser
- Alt = Alternate
- ITF = ITF entry
- PR = Protected ranking
- SR = Special ranking
- SE = Special exempt
- JE = Junior exempt
- JR = Junior Accelerator Programme entrant
- CO = College Accelerator Programme entrant
- NG = Next Gen Accelerator Program entrant
- w/o = Walkover
- r = Retired
- d = Defaulted

=== Draw ===
Quarterfinals
1	(Ukraine) V Strakhova; A Tikhonova	w/o
(France) E Jacquemot (Spain) K Quevedo
(United States) R McAdoo (United States) A Rogers	6	7^{7}
(Australia) A Osborne; E Ovcharenko	4	6^{3}
(Czech Republic) D Šalková (Latvia) D Semeņistaja	1	1
(Spain) Y Cavallé Reimers (Belgium) L Salden	6	6
WC	(Colombia) V Mediorreal Arias (Colombia) MP Pérez García	3	6^{6}
2	(United States) D Hewitt (United States) A Smith	6	7^{8}

Semifinals
1	(Ukraine) V Strakhova; A Tikhonova
(United States) R McAdoo (United States) A Rogers	w/o
(Spain) Y Cavallé Reimers (Belgium) L Salden	1	6	[8]
2	(United States) D Hewitt (United States) A Smith	6	3	[10]

Final
(United States) R McAdoo (United States) A Rogers	7^{7}	6
2	(United States) D Hewitt (United States) A Smith	6^{3}	3
