= Nicole Riner =

Swiss tennis player

- Country (sports): Switzerland
- Born: 13 June 1990 (age 34); Stans, Switzerland
- Height: 1.78 m (5 ft 10 in)
- Turned pro: 2006
- Retired: 2010
- Prize money: $33,703

Singles
- Career record: 96–67
- Career titles: 4 ITF
- Highest ranking: No. 265 (3 August 2009)

Doubles
- Career record: 34–32
- Career titles: 3 ITF
- Highest ranking: No. 321 (14 September 2009)

Nicole Riner (born 13 June 1990) is a Swiss former tennis player.

In her career, Riner won four singles and three doubles titles on the ITF Women's Circuit. On 3 August 2009, she reached her best singles ranking of world No. 265. On 14 September 2009, she peaked at No. 321 in the doubles rankings.

Riner played two matches (two losses) for the Switzerland Fed Cup team in 2006.

== ITF Circuit finals ==
=== Singles: 6 (4 titles, 2 runner-ups) ===
Legend $75,000 tournaments $50,000 tournaments $25,000 tournaments $10,000 tournaments	Finals by surface Hard (1–1) Clay (3–1)

Result	No.	Date	Tournament	Surface	Opponent	Score
Win	1.	14 May 2007	ITF Balikpapan, Indonesia	Hard (i)	(Indonesia) Sandy Gumulya	4–6, 6–3, 7–5
Win	2.	12 November 2007	ITF Manila, Philippines	Clay	(Chinese Taipei) Chang Kai-chen	6–3, 6–2
Win	3.	19 November 2007	ITF Manila, Philippines	Clay	(Uzbekistan) Vlada Ekshibarova	4–6, 6–3, 6–4
Loss	1.	14 January 2008	ITF Stuttgart, Germany	Hard (i)	(Netherlands) Renée Reinhard	6–2, 4–6, 4–6
Win	4.	25 August 2008	ITF Pörtschach, Austria	Clay	(Austria) Iris Khanna	6–2, 6–4
Loss	2.	4 May 2009	ITF Ipswich, Australia	Clay	(Australia) Anastasia Rodionova	4–6, 5–7

=== Doubles: 7 (3 titles, 4 runner-ups) ===
Legend $25,000 tournaments $10,000 tournaments	Finals by surface Hard (0–1) Clay (3–3)

Result	No.	Date	Tournament	Surface	Partner	Opponents	Score
Loss	1.	30 April 2007	ITF Bournemouth, United Kingdom	Clay	(Austria) Melanie Klaffner	(Australia) Alenka Hubacek (Australia) Jessica Moore	7–5, 4–6, 4–6
Win	1.	18 June 2007	ITF Davos, Switzerland	Clay	(Switzerland) Sarah Moundir	(Australia) Jessica Schaer (Spain) Sheila Solsona Carcasona	7–6^{(7–1)}, 6–3
Win	2.	1 October 2007	ITF Porto, Portugal	Clay	(Switzerland) Conny Perrin	(France) Claire de Gubernatis (Russia) Anna Savitskaya	5–7, 6–3, [10–3]
Loss	2.	8 September 2008	ITF Innsbruck, Austria	Clay	(Switzerland) Conny Perrin	(Ukraine) Irina Buryachok (Georgia (country)) Oksana Kalashnikova	6–3, 3–6, [7–10]
Loss	3.	15 September 2008	ITF Casale Monferrato, Italy	Clay	(Switzerland) Amra Sadiković	(Portugal) Catarina Ferreira (Georgia (country)) Oksana Kalashnikova	5–7, 6–7^{(5–7)}
Win	3.	27 April 2009	ITF Bundaberg, Australia	Clay	(Japan) Maki Arai	(Australia) Isabella Holland (Australia) Sally Peers	1–6, 6–4, [11–9]
Loss	4.	20 July 2009	ITF Les Contamines-Montjoie, France	Hard	(France) Anaïs Laurendon	(Romania) Laura-Ioana Andrei (Poland) Patrycja Sanduska	2–6, 3–6

== Fed Cup participation ==
=== Singles ===
Edition	Stage	Date	Location	Against	Surface	Opponent	W/L	Score
2006 Fed Cup; World Group II	WG2	23 April 2006	Tokyo, Japan	Japan	Hard (i)	(Japan) Aiko Nakamura	L	1–6, 6–3, 2–6
2006 Fed Cup; World Group II	WG2 P/O	15 July 2006	Chavannes-de-Bogis, Switzerland	Australia	Hard	(Australia) Samantha Stosur	L	1–6, 2–6
