= 2024 Barranquilla Open – Singles =

Singles
- 2024 Barranquilla Open

Final
- Champion: (Argentina) Nadia Podoroska
- Runner-up: (Germany) Tatjana Maria
- Score: 6–2, 1–6, 6–3

Events
Singles	Doubles
- Barranquilla Open

Nadia Podoroska won the singles title at the 2024 Barranquilla Open, defeating defending champion Tatjana Maria in the final, 6–2, 1–6, 6–3.

== Seeds ==
1. (Germany) Tatjana Maria (final)
2. (Belgium) Greet Minnen (first round, retired)
3. (Argentina) María Lourdes Carlé (first round)
4. (Argentina) Nadia Podoroska (champion)
5. (United States) Emina Bektas (second round)
6. (Netherlands) Suzan Lamens (quarterfinals)
7. (Colombia) Emiliana Arango (first round)
8. (France) Elsa Jacquemot (second round)

== Draw ==
Key

- Q = Qualifier
- WC = Wild card
- LL = Lucky loser
- Alt = Alternate
- ITF = ITF entry
- PR = Protected ranking
- SR = Special ranking
- SE = Special exempt
- JE = Junior exempt
- JR = Junior Accelerator Programme entrant
- CO = College Accelerator Programme entrant
- NG = Next Gen Accelerator Program entrant
- w/o = Walkover
- r = Retired
- d = Defaulted

=== Finals ===
Semifinals
1	(Germany) Tatjana Maria	w/o
(Croatia) Antonia Ružić
4/WC	(Argentina) Nadia Podoroska	6	1	6
(Ukraine) Anastasiia Sobolieva	1	6	1

Final
1	(Germany) Tatjana Maria	2	6	3
4/WC	(Argentina) Nadia Podoroska	6	1	6

=== Top half ===
First round
1	(Germany) T Maria	6	6
WC	(Colombia) M Herazo González	0	1
(United States) E Mandlik	6	6
Q	(United States) J Failla	4	2
(Poland) K Kawa	1	3
(United Kingdom) F Jones	6	6
Q	(Israel) L Glushko	5	1
6	(Netherlands) S Lamens	7	6
3	(Argentina) ML Carlé	6	6^{4}	2
Q	(Chinese Taipei) E-s Liang	1	7^{7}	6
(South Korea) S-j Jang	6	3	2
(Argentina) S Sierra	3	6	6
(United States) V Lepchenko	6	4
(Bulgaria) G Topalova	0	1^{r}
(Croatia) A Ružić	6	6
7	(Colombia) E Arango	2	4

Second round
1	(Germany) T Maria	6	4	6
(United States) E Mandlik	4	6	3
(United Kingdom) F Jones	4	6	4
6	(Netherlands) S Lamens	6	1	6
Q	(Chinese Taipei) E-s Liang	4	2
(Argentina) S Sierra	6	6
(United States) V Lepchenko	6	2	3
(Croatia) A Ružić	3	6	6

Quarterfinals
1	(Germany) T Maria	7	7
6	(Netherlands) S Lamens	5	5
(Argentina) S Sierra	2	6	1
(Croatia) A Ružić	6	2	6

Semifinals
1	(Germany) T Maria	w/o
(Croatia) A Ružić

=== Bottom half ===
First round
8	(France) E Jacquemot	6	4	6
(Czech Republic) L Klimovičová	0	6	3
M Timofeeva	6	6^{1}	0
(Georgia (country)) M Bolkvadze	3	7^{7}	6
(France) C Monnet	6	6^{3}	5
(China) X Gao	2	7^{7}	7
(China) X You	2	2
4/WC	(Argentina) N Podoroska	6	6
5	(United States) E Bektas	7^{7}	6
(Greece) D Papamichail	6^{5}	2
(Australia) D Aiava	2	4
(Slovakia) V Hrunčáková	6	6
WC	(Colombia) MP Pérez	1	0
(Ukraine) A Sobolieva	6	6
Q	(Slovakia) M Okáľová	7^{9}	0^{r}
2	(Belgium) G Minnen	6^{7}	2

Second round
8	(France) E Jacquemot	7^{7}	6^{4}	6^{3}
(Georgia (country)) M Bolkvadze	6^{4}	7^{7}	7^{7}
(China) X Gao	1	0^{r}
4/WC	(Argentina) N Podoroska	6	2
5	(United States) E Bektas	5	6^{4}
(Slovakia) V Hrunčáková	7	7^{7}
(Ukraine) A Sobolieva	6	7
Q	(Slovakia) M Okáľová	4	5

Quarterfinals
(Georgia (country)) M Bolkvadze	4	3
4/WC	(Argentina) N Podoroska	6	6
(Slovakia) V Hrunčáková	4	7^{7}	2
(Ukraine) A Sobolieva	6	6^{3}	6

Semifinals
4/WC	(Argentina) N Podoroska	6	1	6
(Ukraine) A Sobolieva	1	6	1

== Qualifying ==
=== Seeds ===
The top six seeds received a bye into the qualifying competition.

1. (Israel) Lina Glushko (qualified)
2. (Canada) Carol Zhao (qualifying competition, retired)
3. (Chinese Taipei) Liang En-shuo (qualified)
4. (United States) Madison Sieg (qualifying competition, retired)
5. (Serbia) Aleksandra Krunić (qualifying competition)
6. (United Kingdom) Emily Appleton (qualifying competition)
7. (Japan) Hiroko Kuwata (first round)
8. (United States) Jessica Failla (qualified)

=== Qualifiers ===
1. (Israel) Lina Glushko
2. (United States) Jessica Failla
3. (Chinese Taipei) Liang En-shuo
4. (Slovakia) Martina Okáľová

=== Qualifying draw ===
==== First qualifier ====
Qualifying competition
1	(Israel) Lina Glushko	6	6
5	(Serbia) Aleksandra Krunić	1	1

==== Second qualifier ====
First round				Qualifying competition
				2	(Canada) Carol Zhao	2	5^{r}
				8	(United States) Jessica Failla	6	6
WC	(Colombia) Ana Becerra	1	1	8	(United States) Jessica Failla	6	6
8	(United States) Jessica Failla	6	6

==== Third qualifier ====
Qualifying competition
3	(Chinese Taipei) Liang En-shuo	6	6
6	(United Kingdom) Emily Appleton	1	1

==== Fourth qualifier ====
First round					Qualifying competition
					4	(United States) Madison Sieg	6	3	0^{r}
						(Slovakia) Martina Okáľová	4	6	5
	(Slovakia) Martina Okáľová	0	6	6		(Slovakia) Martina Okáľová	4	6	5
7	(Japan) Hiroko Kuwata	6	2	1
