= 2008 Fed Cup World Group =

Part of tennis tournament

- Date: 2 February – 14 September
- Edition: 18th

Champions
- Russia
- Fed Cup

The World Group was the highest level of Fed Cup competition in 2008. Eight nations competed in a three-round knockout competition. Russia was the defending champion, and they succeeded in defending their title by defeating Spain in the final, 4–0.

== Participating teams ==
Participating teams
China	France	Germany	Israel
Italy	Russia	Spain	United States

== Draw ==
Quarterfinals; 2–3 February
Ramat HaSharon, Israel (Outdoor hard)
1	Russia	4
Israel	1
La Jolla, United States (Outdoor hard)
Germany	1
4	United States	4
Beijing, China (Indoor hard)
3	France	2
China	3
Naples, Italy (Indoor hard)
Spain	3
2	Italy	2

Semifinals; 26–27 April
Moscow, Russia (Indoor clay)
1	Russia	3
4	United States	2
Beijing, China (Indoor hard)
China	1
Spain	4

Final; 13–14 September
Madrid, Spain (Outdoor clay)
1	Russia	4
Spain	0

== Quarterfinals ==
=== Russia vs. Israel ===
Russia
4
Canada Stadium, Ramat HaSharon, Israel
2–3 February 2008
Acrylic hard (outdoors)

Israel
1

			1	2	3
1	(Russia) (Israel)	Dinara Safina; Shahar Pe'er	6; 0	2; 6	2; 6
2	(Russia) (Israel)	Maria Sharapova; Tzipora Obziler	6; 0	6; 4
3	(Russia) (Israel)	Maria Sharapova; Shahar Pe'er	6; 1	6; 1
4	(Russia) (Israel)	Anna Chakvetadze; Tzipora Obziler	6; 4	6; 2
5	(Russia) (Israel)	Dinara Safina / Elena Vesnina; Tzipora Obziler / Shahar Pe'er	6; 0	1; 6	6; 4

=== Germany vs. United States ===
Germany
1
La Jolla Beach and Tennis Club, La Jolla, California, United States
2–3 February 2008
Decoturf (outdoors)

United States
4

			1	2	3
1	(Germany) (United States)	Sabine Lisicki; Lindsay Davenport	6; 1	7; 5
2	(Germany) (United States)	Tatjana Malek; Ashley Harkleroad	1; 6	3; 6
3	(Germany) (United States)	Julia Görges; Lindsay Davenport	1; 6	2; 6
4	(Germany) (United States)	Sabine Lisicki; Ashley Harkleroad	4; 6	5; 7
5	(Germany) (United States)	Anna-Lena Grönefeld / Tatjana Malek; Lisa Raymond / Lindsay Davenport	2; 6	0; 6

=== France vs. China ===
France
2
Beijing International Tennis Centre, Beijing, China
2–3 February 2008
Rebound Ace (indoors)

China
3

			1	2	3
1	(France) (China)	Alizé Cornet; Li Na	3; 6	1; 6
2	(France) (China)	Virginie Razzano; Peng Shuai	6; 4	3; 6	4; 6
3	(France) (China)	Virginie Razzano; Li Na	4; 6	6; 2	6; 4
4	(France) (China)	Nathalie Dechy; Yan Zi	6; 3	6; 2
5	(France) (China)	Virginie Razzano / Nathalie Dechy; Yan Zi / Zheng Jie	5; 7	6^{5} 7^{7}

=== Spain vs. Italy ===
Spain
3
PalaEldo, Naples, Italy
2–3 February 2008
RuKortHard (indoors)

Italy
2

			1	2	3
1	(Spain) (Italy)	Nuria Llagostera Vives; Francesca Schiavone	7^{7} 6^{4}	3; 6	6; 2
2	(Spain) (Italy)	Anabel Medina Garrigues; Flavia Pennetta	6; 2	6; 3
3	(Spain) (Italy)	Anabel Medina Garrigues; Francesca Schiavone	6; 4	6; 1
4	(Spain) (Italy)	Lourdes Domínguez Lino; Sara Errani	7; 5	4; 6	0; 6
5	(Spain) (Italy)	Nuria Llagostera Vives / Carla Suárez Navarro; Tathiana Garbin / Sara Errani	4; 6	3; 6

== Semifinals ==
=== Russia vs. United States ===
Russia
3
Luzhniki Palace of Sports, Moscow, Russia
26–27 April 2008
Red clay (indoors)

United States
2

			1	2	3
1	(Russia) (United States)	Anna Chakvetadze; Vania King	6; 4	7; 5
2	(Russia) (United States)	Svetlana Kuznetsova; Ahsha Rolle	6; 2	6; 1
3	(Russia) (United States)	Vera Zvonareva; Vania King	4; 6	6; 3	6; 2
4	(Russia) (United States)	Elena Vesnina; Ahsha Rolle	3; 6	4; 6
5	(Russia) (United States)	Svetlana Kuznetsova / Elena Vesnina; Liezel Huber / Vania King	6^{3} 7^{7}	4; 6

=== China vs. Spain ===
China
1
Beijing International Tennis Centre, Beijing, China
26–27 April 2008
Rebound Ace (indoors)

Spain
4

			1	2	3
1	(China) (Spain)	Peng Shuai; Carla Suárez Navarro	3; 6	6^{4} 7^{7}
2	(China) (Spain)	Zheng Jie; Nuria Llagostera Vives	3; 6	4; 6
3	(China) (Spain)	Peng Shuai; Nuria Llagostera Vives	4; 6	4; 6
4	(China) (Spain)	Zheng Jie; Carla Suárez Navarro	7^{7} 6^{5}	6; 3
5	(China) (Spain)	Peng Shuai / Sun Tiantian; María José Martínez Sánchez / Nuria Llagostera Vives	2; 6	1; 6

== Final ==
=== Russia vs. Spain ===
Russia
4
Club de Campo Villa de Madrid, Madrid, Spain
13–14 September 2008
Red clay (outdoors)

Spain
0

			1	2	3
1	(Russia) (Spain)	Vera Zvonareva; Anabel Medina Garrigues	6; 3	6; 4
2	(Russia) (Spain)	Svetlana Kuznetsova; Carla Suárez Navarro	6; 3	6; 1
3	(Russia) (Spain)	Svetlana Kuznetsova; Anabel Medina Garrigues	5; 7	6; 3	6; 4
4	(Russia) (Spain)	Vera Zvonareva; Carla Suárez Navarro				not played
5	(Russia) (Spain)	Ekaterina Makarova / Elena Vesnina; Nuria Llagostera Vives / Carla Suárez Navarro	6; 2	6; 1

2008 Fed Cup champions

Russia
Fourth title

== See also ==
- Fed Cup structure
