= 2006 Fed Cup World Group II =

Part of tennis tournament

The World Group II was the second highest level of Fed Cup competition in 2006. Winning nations advanced to the World Group play-offs, and the losing nations were demoted to the World Group II play-offs.

== Japan vs. Switzerland ==
Japan
4
Ariake Coliseum, Tokyo, Japan
22–23 April 2006
Decoturf (indoors)

Switzerland
1

			1	2	3
1	(Japan) (Switzerland)	Aiko Nakamura; Timea Bacsinszky	6; 2	3; 6	6; 1
2	(Japan) (Switzerland)	Ai Sugiyama; Stefanie Vögele	6; 2	4; 6	6; 1
3	(Japan) (Switzerland)	Shinobu Asagoe; Timea Bacsinszky	2; 6	2; 6
4	(Japan) (Switzerland)	Aiko Nakamura; Nicole Riner	6; 1	3; 6	6; 2
5	(Japan) (Switzerland)	Akiko Morigami / Ai Sugiyama; Timea Bacsinszky / Stefania Boffa	6; 2	2; 6	6; 0

== Croatia vs. Argentina ==
Croatia
3
Dom Sportova, Zagreb, Croatia
22–23 April 2006
Greenset carpet (indoors)

Argentina
2

			1	2	3
1	(Croatia) (Argentina)	Karolina Šprem; María José Argeri	6; 2	6; 4
2	(Croatia) (Argentina)	Ivana Lisjak; Mariana Díaz Oliva	2; 6	6; 3	4; 6
3	(Croatia) (Argentina)	Karolina Šprem; Mariana Díaz Oliva	6; 4	6; 2
4	(Croatia) (Argentina)	Ivana Lisjak; María José Argeri	6; 2	1; 6	4; 6
5	(Croatia) (Argentina)	Matea Mezak / Karolina Šprem; María José Argeri / Mariana Díaz Oliva	6; 3	6; 3

== Thailand vs. Czech Republic ==
Thailand
1
The Tennis Academy of Asia, Bangkok, Thailand
22–23 April 2006
Plexipave (outdoors)

Czech Republic
4

			1	2	3
1	(Thailand) (Czech Republic)	Suchanun Viratprasert; Iveta Benešová	6; 4	6; 4
2	(Thailand) (Czech Republic)	Montinee Tangphong; Nicole Vaidišová	0; 6	2; 6
3	(Thailand) (Czech Republic)	Suchanun Viratprasert; Nicole Vaidišová	6; 3	2; 6	0; 6
4	(Thailand) (Czech Republic)	Montinee Tangphong; Klára Koukalová	2; 6	6^{5} 7^{7}
5	(Thailand) (Czech Republic)	Nudnida Luangnam / Napaporn Tongsalee; Iveta Benešová / Barbora Strýcová	2; 6	3; 6

== Indonesia vs. China ==
Indonesia
0
Gelora Bung Karno Stadium, Jakarta, Indonesia
22–23 April 2006
Plexipave (outdoors)

China
4

			1	2	3
1	(Indonesia) (China)	Angelique Widjaja; Li Na	3; 6	6; 4	3; 6
2	(Indonesia) (China)	Romana Tedjakusuma; Peng Shuai	6; 2	4; 6	0; 6
3	(Indonesia) (China)	Romana Tedjakusuma; Li Na	3; 6	4; 6
4	(Indonesia) (China)	Angelique Widjaja; Peng Shuai	3; 6	0; 6
5	(Indonesia) (China)	Ayu-Fani Damayanti / Septi Mende; Yan Zi / Zheng Jie				not played

== See also ==
- Fed Cup structure
