= 2026 Barranquilla Open – Singles =

Singles
- 2026 Barranquilla Open

Final
- Champion: (United States) Claire Liu
- Runner-up: Anna Blinkova
- Score: 6–0, 2–6, 7–5

Events
Singles	Doubles
- Barranquilla Open

Claire Liu won the title, defeating Anna Blinkova 6–0, 2–6, 7–5 in the final.

Nadia Podoroska was the defending champion when the tournament was last held in 2024, but lost in the second round to Blinkova.

== Seeds ==
1. (Colombia) Emiliana Arango (second round)
2. Anna Blinkova (final)
3. (Spain) Kaitlin Quevedo (quarterfinals)
4. (Latvia) Darja Semeņistaja (first round)
5. (United States) Claire Liu (champion)
6. (United States) Kayla Day (second round)
7. (Czech Republic) Dominika Šalková (first round)
8. (Italy) Lucrezia Stefanini (withdrew)

== Draw ==
Key

- Q = Qualifier
- WC = Wild card
- LL = Lucky loser
- Alt = Alternate
- ITF = ITF entry
- PR = Protected ranking
- SR = Special ranking
- SE = Special exempt
- JE = Junior exempt
- JR = Junior Accelerator Programme entrant
- CO = College Accelerator Programme entrant
- NG = Next Gen Accelerator Program entrant
- w/o = Walkover
- r = Retired
- d = Defaulted

=== Finals ===
Semifinals
(France) Léolia Jeanjean	2	4
5	(United States) Claire Liu	6	6
Q	(France) Elsa Jacquemot	1	6^{5}
2	Anna Blinkova	6	7^{7}

Final
5	(United States) Claire Liu	6	2	7
2	Anna Blinkova	0	6	5

=== Top half ===
First round
1	(Colombia) E Arango	6	6
WC	(Colombia) MP Pérez García	0	2
(Czech Republic) V Valdmannová	3	6^{5}
(United States) CYS Lee	6	7^{7}
(France) L Jeanjean	6	7^{7}
Q	(Brazil) C Alves	2	6^{3}
(United States) J Pareja	7	6
LL	(Australia) L Cabrera	5	2
3	(Spain) K Quevedo	6	4	7
Q	(United States) A Rogers	3	6	5
(Canada) C Brace	2	6	4
(Spain) S Sorribes Tormo	6	4	6
(United States) K Scott	6^{1}	1
(United States) V Lepchenko	7^{7}	6
(China) X You	5	0
5	(United States) C Liu	7	6

Second round
1	(Colombia) E Arango	6^{5}	5
(United States) CYS Lee	7^{7}	7
(France) L Jeanjean	7^{7}	3	6
(United States) J Pareja	6^{5}	6	3
3	(Spain) K Quevedo	5	7	6
(Spain) S Sorribes Tormo	7	5	1
(United States) V Lepchenko	3	3
5	(United States) C Liu	6	6

Quarterfinals
(United States) CYS Lee	1	6^{4}
(France) L Jeanjean	6	7^{7}
3	(Spain) K Quevedo	5	1
5	(United States) C Liu	7	6

Semifinals
(France) L Jeanjean	2	4
5	(United States) C Liu	6	6

=== Bottom half ===
First round
6	(United States) K Day	6	6
(Netherlands) S Lamens	4	3
WC	(Colombia) E Lares	0	0
Q	(France) E Jacquemot	6	6
(Japan) N Hibino	6	6
WC	(Colombia) M Torres Murcia	4	1
A Tikhonova	6	4	7
4	(Latvia) D Semeņistaja	4	6	5
7	(Czech Republic) D Šalková	1	3
(Argentina) J Riera	6	6
(Argentina) J Ortenzi	3	2
(United States) M Stoiana	6	6
Q	(Japan) E Koike	6	3	2
PR	(Argentina) N Podoroska	3	6	6
WC	(Colombia) V Mediorreal Arias	1	0
2	A Blinkova	6	6

Second round
6	(United States) K Day	6^{3}	2
Q	(France) E Jacquemot	7^{7}	6
(Japan) N Hibino	4	4
A Tikhonova	6	6
(Argentina) J Riera	4	7^{9}	6
(United States) M Stoiana	6	6^{7}	3
PR	(Argentina) N Podoroska	5	1
2	A Blinkova	7	6

Quarterfinals
Q	(France) E Jacquemot	6^{5}	6	6
A Tikhonova	7^{7}	1	1
(Argentina) J Riera	2	2
2	A Blinkova	6	6

Semifinals
Q	(France) E Jacquemot	1	6^{5}
2	A Blinkova	6	7^{7}

== Qualifying ==
=== Seeds ===
1. (France) Elsa Jacquemot (qualified)
2. (Australia) Lizette Cabrera (qualifying competition, lucky loser)
3. (Brazil) Carolina Alves (qualified)
4. (Japan) Ena Koike (qualified)

=== Qualifiers ===
1. (France) Elsa Jacquemot
2. (United States) Anna Rogers
3. (Brazil) Carolina Alves
4. (Japan) Ena Koike

=== Lucky loser ===
1. (Australia) Lizette Cabrera

=== Qualifying draw ===
==== First qualifier ====
Qualifying competition
1	(France) Elsa Jacquemot	6	6^{5}	6
	Ekaterina Ovcharenko	4	7^{7}	1

==== Second qualifier ====
Qualifying competition
2	(Australia) Lizette Cabrera	6	1	2
	(United States) Anna Rogers	4	6	6

==== Third qualifier ====
Qualifying competition
3	(Brazil) Carolina Alves	6	6
	(Chile) Antonia Vergara Rivera	2	4

==== Fourth qualifier ====
Qualifying competition
4	(Japan) Ena Koike	6	6
WC	(Colombia) Laura Valentina Villamil Arias	0	2
