= Claire Liu =

American tennis player (born 2000)

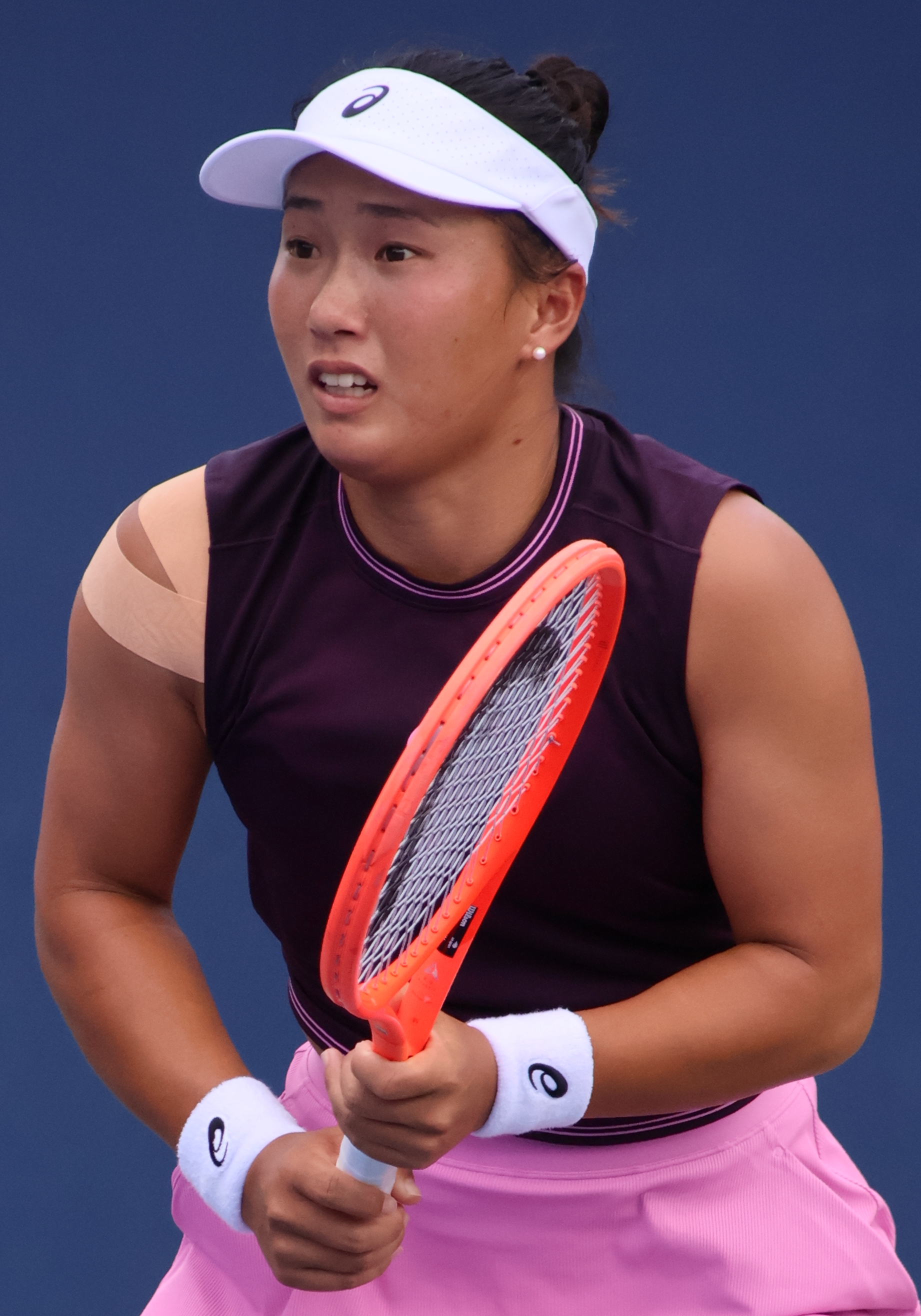
- Liu at the 2026 US Open
- Country (sports): United States
- Residence: Thousand Oaks, California, US
- Born: May 25, 2000 (age 26) Thousand Oaks, California, US
- Height: 1.70 m (5 ft 7 in)
- Plays: Right (two-handed backhand)
- Prize money: $2,956,270

Singles
- Career record: 300–206
- Career titles: 1
- Highest ranking: No. 52 (January 30, 2023)
- Current ranking: No. 69 (November 9, 2026)

Grand Slam singles results
- Australian Open: 2R (2023)
- French Open: 2R (2023, 2026)
- Wimbledon: 3R (2026)
- US Open: 2R (2018)

Doubles
- Career record: 31–35
- Career titles: 1 WTA 125
- Highest ranking: No. 257 (January 30, 2023)
- Current ranking: No. 777 (November 9, 2026)

Grand Slam doubles results
- Australian Open: 2R (2023)
- US Open: 1R (2017, 2021, 2022, 2026)

Grand Slam mixed doubles results
- US Open: 1R (2015)
- Last updated on: November 9, 2026.

Claire Liu
- Simplified Chinese: 刘婧文
- Traditional Chinese: 劉婧文
Transcriptions
Standard Mandarin
- Hanyu Pinyin: Liú Jìngwén
- Bopomofo: ㄌㄧㄡˊㄐㄧㄥˋ ㄨㄣˊ
- Gwoyeu Romatzyh: Liou Jinqwen
- Wade–Giles: Liu^{2} Ching^{4}wen^{2}
- Tongyong Pinyin: Lióu Jìngwún
- Yale Romanization: Lyóu Jìngwén
- MPS2: Lióu Jìng-wén
- IPA: [ljǒʊ tɕîŋ wə̌n]

Claire Liu (Note: Chinese: 刘婧文; pinyin: Liú Jìngwén) (born May 25, 2000) is an American professional tennis player. She reached her career-high singles ranking of world No. 52 on January 30, 2023. Liu has won one WTA Tour singles title, at the 2026 Hong Kong Open.

She has also won two singles titles and one in doubles at WTA 125 level, while on the ITF Women's World Tour, she has won eight titles in singles and one in doubles. In 2017, Liu was the world No. 1 in junior rankings, winning the Wimbledon girls' singles title and finishing runner-up at the French Open. She also won a junior Grand Slam doubles title at Wimbledon with Usue Arconada in 2016.

== Personal life ==
Liu grew up in Thousand Oaks, California. Both her parents are Chinese immigrants.

In 2023, she began maintaining a blog that recounts her experiences on the professional tennis tour and personal life.

== Career ==
=== Juniors ===
Grand Slam performance

Singles

- Australian Open: –
- French Open: F (2017)
- Wimbledon: W (2017)
- US Open: 2R (2013, 2016)

Doubles

- Australian Open: –
- French Open: QF (2017)
- Wimbledon: W (2016)
- US Open: QF (2016)

Liu won the Wimbledon junior doubles tournament in 2016 with fellow American Usue Maitane Arconada, defeating Mariam Bolkvadze and Caty McNally in the final. The following year, after losing the French Open junior final to Whitney Osuigwe, she won the Wimbledon singles title against Ann Li, making her the first American to win the event since Chanda Rubin in 1992. With this Grand Slam success, Liu rose to world No. 1 in the girls' junior rankings.

=== 2015: First professional title, mixed doubles major debut ===
She won her first professional title in March 2015 at a clay-court tournament on the ITF Women's Circuit. At age 14, Liu was the youngest tennis player to win a professional tournament since Anna Kournikova in 1996.

On her debut at the US Open, Liu was granted a wildcard into the qualifying tournament, losing in the final round. Liu, alongside Taylor Fritz, was given a wildcard for the mixed-doubles draw; they were defeated in the first round.

=== 2017–2021: First major match win, top 100 ===
After securing two ITF tournament wins in 2017, Liu was granted again a wildcard into the qualifying for the US Open and earned a spot in the singles main draw of a Grand Slam championship for the first time. She was defeated in the first round by Duan Yingying.

Liu qualified for the main draw at the 2018 Wimbledon Championships and won her first match at a major by defeating Ana Konjuh, before losing in the second round to 11th seed eventual champion, Angelique Kerber, in three sets.

In October 2019, Liu won her fourth title on the ITF Circuit at a $25k tournament in Florence, South Carolina.

After finishing as a runner-up in two tournaments in 2020 and another two in 2021, Liu won consecutive tournaments in May 2021 at the $60k event in Charlottesville, Virginia and the $100k Charleston Pro Tennis. As a result, she entered the top 100 on 23 August 2021.

=== 2022: First WTA Tour final and Challenger title ===
In May, Liu won her first WTA 125 title at the Trophee Lagardère in Paris, defeating Beatriz Haddad Maia in the final. The following week, she reached her first WTA Tour final in Rabat losing to Martina Trevisan.

She made it through to the semifinals at the Jasmin Open in Monastir, Tunisia, defeating top seed Ons Jabeur in the quarterfinals for her first win over a top-10 ranked player. Her run was ended in the last four by fifth seed and eventual champion Elise Mertens.

=== 2023: WTA 1000 third round, Challenger final ===
At the 2023 Australian Open, Liu overcame Madison Brengle to reach the second round, where she lost to 12th seed Belinda Bencic. She reached the third round of a WTA 1000 tournament for the first time at the Miami Open, losing to 25th seed Martina Trevisan.

Liu made it through to the second round at the French Open thanks to a win over qualifier Ylena In-Albon, but lost to top seed and eventual champion, Iga Świątek.

In July, she reached the quarterfinals at the Swedish Open, losing Louisa Chirico in three sets. The following week at the Hungarian Open, Liu recorded wins over fourth seed Yulia Putintseva and eighth seed Anna Karolína Schmiedlová en route to the semifinals, where she lost to Kateryna Baindl.

Liu was runner-up at the Chicago Challenger, losing to Viktoriya Tomova in the final. She reached the quarterfinals at the Korea Open where she lost to top seed and eventual champion, Jessica Pegula.

=== 2024–2025: Hiatus and comeback ===
In May 2024, Liu won the W75 Open Saint-Gaudens in France, defeating Séléna Janicijevic in the final. She qualified for the 2024 Miami Open and defeated Petra Martić, before retiring due to injury in her second round match against 10th seed Daria Kasatkina by retiring. She also qualified for the 2024 Charleston Open, but lost in the first round to wildcard entrant Shelby Rogers. Liu took the rest of the 2024 season off for a mental health break.

Seven months after her previous match, Liu returned to competitive tennis at the W75 event in Nonthaburi, Thailand, in January 2025 reaching the semifinals, before withdrawing due to a neck problem. She qualified for the WTA 1000 tournament in Indian Wells in March but lost to Polina Kudermetova in the first round. Liu also qualified for the Miami Open but again was eliminated in the first round, this time by Linda Fruhvirtová.

Liu made it through qualifying at the US Open, but lost to Cristina Bucșa in the first round. In October 2025, at the Guangzhou Open, she qualified for the main draw and defeated fourth seed Alexandra Eala, Anna Bondár and Ella Seidel to reach her first WTA Tour semifinal since July 2023. Liu lost in the last four to Lulu Sun.

=== 2026: Maiden WTA Tour title, major third round, top 100 return ===
Liu qualified for the main draw at the French Open and made it into the second round where she lost to Maria Sakkari. The following month, she qualified for the main draw at Wimbledon and defeated Hanne Vandewinkel and Zeynep Sönmez to reach the third round at a major for the first time. In the third round, Liu lost to seventh seed Coco Gauff, in three sets.

In September, Liu won her second WTA 125 singles title at the Barranquilla Open, defeating Anna Blinkova in the final. The following month at the Guangzhou Open, she overcame Antonia Ružić in a three-set match lasting almost three hours, before being handed a walkover into the quarterfinals when Kateřina Siniaková withdrew from the tournament. Liu lost to wildcard entrant Sun Xinran in the last eight. At the Hong Kong Open in November, she recorded wins over qualifier Tatiana Prozorova, eighth seed Katie Boulter, Zeynep Sönmez and qualifier Alexandra Shubladze to make it through to her second WTA Tour final, more than four years after her first. Liu defeated second seed Alexandra Eala in the championship match to claim her maiden WTA Tour title. As a result she climbed 39 places in the WTA singles rankings to world No. 69 on 9 November 2026, her highest position since September 2023.

== Performance timelines ==
Key
W	F	SF	QF	#R	RR	Q#	P#	DNQ	A	Z#	PO	G	S	B	NMS	NTI	P	NH

(W) winner; (F) finalist; (SF) semifinalist; (QF) quarterfinalist; (#R) rounds 4, 3, 2, 1; (RR) round-robin stage; (Q#) qualification round; (P#) preliminary round; (DNQ) did not qualify; (A) absent; (Z#) Davis/Fed Cup Zonal Group (with number indication) or (PO) play-off; (G) gold, (S) silver or (B) bronze Olympic/Paralympic medal; (NMS) not a Masters tournament; (NTI) not a Tier I tournament; (P) postponed; (NH) not held; (SR) strike rate (events won / competed); (W–L) win–loss record.
To avoid confusion and double counting, these charts are updated at the conclusion of a tournament or when the player's participation has ended.

Only main-draw results in WTA Tour, Grand Slam tournaments, Billie Jean King Cup, United Cup, Hopman Cup, and Olympic Games are included in win–loss records.

=== Singles ===
Current through the 2026 Wimbledon Championships.

Tournament	2015	2016	2017	2018	2019	2020	2021	2022	2023	2024	2025	2026	SR	W–L	Win%
Grand Slam tournaments
Australian Open	A	A	A	A	Q1	A	Q2	1R	2R	1R	1R	Q2	0 / 4	1–4	20%
French Open	A	A	A	Q2	Q1	A	Q2	1R	2R	Q1	A	2R	0 / 3	2–3	40%
Wimbledon	A	A	A	2R	Q1	NH	2R	2R	1R	1R	A	3R	0 / 6	5–6	45%
US Open	Q3	A	1R	2R	A	1R	1R	1R	1R	1R	1R	Q1	0 / 8	1–8	11%
Win–Loss	0–0	0–0	0–1	2–2	0–0	0–1	1–2	1–4	2–4	0–3	0–2	3–2	0 / 21	9–21	30%
WTA 1000 tournaments
Qatar Open (Note: The first Premier 5 event of the year has switched back and forth between the Dubai Tennis Championships and the Qatar Ladies Open since 2009 until 2024. Dubai was classified as a Premier 5 event from 2009 to 2011 before being succeeded by Doha for the 2012–2014 period. In 2015, Dubai regained its Premier 5 status, and Doha was demoted to Premier status. The Premier 5 tournaments were reclassified as WTA 1000 tournaments in 2021.)	A	A	A	A	A	A	A	Q2	A	A	A	A	0 / 0	0–0	–
Dubai Championships	A	A	A	A	A	A	A	A	1R	A	A	A	0 / 1	0–1	0%
Indian Wells Open	A	A	Q1	1R	Q1	NH	1R	2R	2R	Q2	1R	A	0 / 5	2–5	29%
Miami Open	A	Q1	A	2R	A	NH	Q1	Q1	3R	2R	1R	A	0 / 4	4–4	50%
Madrid Open	A	A	A	A	A	NH	A	A	1R	Q1	A	A	0 / 1	0–1	0%
Italian Open	A	A	A	A	A	A	A	A	2R	A	A	A	0 / 1	1–1	50%
Canadian Open	A	A	A	A	A	NH	A	1R	A	A	A	A	0 / 1	0–1	0%
Cincinnati Open	A	A	A	A	A	A	A	A	A	A	A	Q2	0 / 0	0–0	–
China Open	A	A	A	A	A	NH			Q2	A	A	A	0 / 0	0–0	–
Wuhan Open	A	A	A	Q1	A	NH				A	A	Q1	0 / 0	0–0	–
Win–Loss	0–0	0–0	0–0	1–2	0–0	0–0	0–1	1–2	4–5	1–1	0–2	0–0	0 / 16	8–16	33%
Career statistics
	2015	2016	2017	2018	2019	2020	2021	2022	2023	2024	2025	2026	SR	W–L	Win%
Tournaments	0	0	2	7	0	1	5	15	20	5	5		Career total: 60		
Titles	0	0	0	0	0	0	0	0	0	0	0		Career total: 0		
Finals	0	0	0	0	0	0	0	1	0	0	0		Career total: 1		
Hard win–loss	0–0	0–0	0–2	2–4	0–0	0–1	1–3	8–10	9–13	1–4	3–5		0 / 42	24–42	36%
Clay win–loss	0–0	0–0	0–0	2–2	0–0	0–0	1–1	5–3	5–5	0–1	0–0		0 / 12	13–12	52%
Grass win–loss	0–0	0–0	0–0	1–1	0–0	0–0	1–1	1–2	0–2	0–0	0–0		0 / 6	3–6	33%
Overall win–loss	0–0	0–0	0–2	5–7	0–0	0–1	3–5	14–15	14–20	1–5	3–5		0 / 60	40–60	40%
Year-end ranking	566	670	263	138	333	222	94	60	94	267	209		$2,918,880		

=== Doubles ===
Current through the 2026 US Open.

Tournament	2017	2018	...	2021	2022	2023	...	2026	SR	W–L
Grand Slam tournaments
Australian Open	A	A		A	A	2R		A	0 / 1	1–1
French Open	A	A		A	A	A		A	0 / 0	0–0
Wimbledon	A	A		A	A	A		A	0 / 0	0–0
US Open	1R	A		1R	1R	A		1R	0 / 4	0–4
Win–Loss	0–1	0–0		0–1	0–1	1–1		0–1	0 / 5	1–5
Career statistics
Tournaments	1	1		2	1	1		0	Career total: 6	
Overall win-loss	0–1	0–1		1–1	0–1	1–1		0–1	0 / 6	2–6
Year-end ranking (Note: 2016: WTA ranking-838, ... 2019: WTA ranking-472, 2020: WTA ranking-462.)	933	629		467	403	273				

== WTA Tour finals ==
=== Singles: 2 (1 title, 1 runner-up) ===
Legend WTA 500 WTA 250 (1–1)	Finals by surface Hard (1–0) Clay (0–1)	Finals by setting Outdoor (1–1)

Result	W–L	Date	Tournament	Tier	Surface	Opponent	Score
Loss	0–1	May 2022	Rabat Grand Prix, Morocco	WTA 250	Clay	(Italy) Martina Trevisan	2–6, 1–6
Win	1–1	Nov 2026	Hong Kong Open, China SAR	WTA 250	Hard	(Philippines) Alexandra Eala	6–3, 6–0

== WTA 125 finals ==
=== Singles: 3 (2 titles, 1 runner-up) ===
Result	W–L	Date	Tournament	Surface	Opponent	Score
Win	1–0	May 2022	Clarins Open Paris, France	Clay	(Brazil) Beatriz Haddad Maia	6–3, 6–4
Loss	1–1	Aug 2023	Chicago Challenger, United States	Hard	(Bulgaria) Viktoriya Tomova	1–6, 4–6
Win	2–1	Sep 2026	Barranquilla Open, Colombia	Hard	Anna Blinkova	6–0, 2–6, 7–5

=== Doubles: 2 (1 title, 1 runner-up) ===
Result	W–L	Date	Tournament	Surface	Partner	Opponents	Score
Win	1–0	Jun 2022	Veneto Open, Italy	Grass	(United States) Madison Brengle	Vitalia Diatchenko (Georgia (country)) Oksana Kalashnikova	6–4, 6–3
Loss	1–1	Aug 2023	Golden Gate Open, US	Hard	(United States) Hailey Baptiste	(United Kingdom) Jodie Burrage (Australia) Olivia Gadecki	6–7^{(4)}, 7–6^{(6)}, [8–10]

== ITF Circuit finals ==
=== Singles: 12 (8 titles, 4 runner-ups) ===
Legend W100 tournaments (1–1) W60/75 tournaments (3–0) W25 tournaments (3–3) W10 tournaments (1–0)	Finals by surface Hard (0–4) Clay (8–0)

Result	W–L	Date	Tournament	Tier	Surface	Opponent	Score
Win	1–0	Mar 2015	ITF Orlando, United States	10k	Clay	(Hungary) Fanny Stollár	6–1, 6–3
Win	2–0	May 2017	ITF Naples, United States	W25	Clay	(United States) Danielle Collins	6–3, 6–1
Win	3–0	May 2017	ITF Caserta, Italy	W25	Clay	(Spain) Paula Badosa	6–3, 6–3
Win	4–0	Oct 2019	ITF Florence, US	W25	Clay	(United States) Peyton Stearns	6–1, 6–2
Loss	4–1	Jan 2020	ITF Malibu, US	W25	Hard	(Argentina) Nadia Podoroska	6–3, 3–6, 3–6
Loss	4–2	Feb 2020	Kentucky Open, US	W100	Hard (i)	(Belarus) Olga Govortsova	4–6, 4–6
Loss	4–3	Feb 2021	ITF Boca Raton, US	W25	Hard	(United States) Varvara Lepchenko	6–3, 4–6, 0–6
Loss	4–4	Mar 2021	ITF Newport Beach, US	W25	Hard	(United States) Danielle Lao	2–6, 6–4, 2–6
Win	5–4	Apr 2021	Charlottesville Open, US	W60	Clay	(China) Wang Xinyu	3–6, 6–4, 4–1 ret.
Win	6–4	May 2021	ITF Charleston Pro, US	W100	Clay	(United States) Madison Brengle	6–2, 7–6^{(6)}
Win	7–4	May 2024	Open Saint-Gaudens, France	W75	Clay	(France) Séléna Janicijevic	6–1, 6–7^{(3)}, 6–0
Win	8–4	May 2026	Empire Slovak Open, Slovakia	W75	Clay	(Czech Republic) Anna Sisková	6–7^{(0)}, 7–6^{(4)}, 7–6^{(5)}

=== Doubles: 1 (title) ===
Legend W60 tournaments (1–0)	Finals by surface Hard (1–0)

Result	W–L	Date	Tournament	Tier	Surface	Partner	Opponents	Score
Win	1–0	Aug 2019	Landisville Tennis Challenge, United States	W60	Hard	(United States) Vania King	(United States) Hayley Carter (United States) Jamie Loeb	4–6, 6–2, [10–5]

== Junior Grand Slam tournament finals ==
=== Singles: 2 (1 title, 1 runner-up) ===
Result	Year	Tournament	Surface	Opponent	Score
Loss	2017	French Open	Clay	(United States) Whitney Osuigwe	4–6, 7–6^{(5)}, 3–6
Win	2017	Wimbledon	Grass	(United States) Ann Li	6–2, 5–7, 6–2

=== Doubles: 1 (title) ===
Result	Year	Tournament	Surface	Partner	Opponents	Score
Win	2016	Wimbledon	Grass	(United States) Usue Maitane Arconada	(Georgia (country)) Mariam Bolkvadze (United States) Caty McNally	6–2, 6–3

== Wins over top 10 players ==
- Liu has a 1–8 (11%) record against players who were, at the time the match was played, ranked in the top 10.

No.	Player	Rk	Event	Surface	Rd	Score	Rk	Years	Ref
1	(Tunisia) Ons Jabeur	2	Jasmin Open, Tunisia	Hard	QF	6–3, 4–6, 6–4	73	2022	

- Key: (Rk) first use, opponent rank; (Rd) round; (Rk) 2nd use, player rank; (Ref) reference; (F) final; (SF) semifinal; (QF) quarterfinal; (#R) rounds 4, 3, 2, 1; (RR) round-robin stage; (Q#) qualifying rounds or stages (3), 2, 1.
