= 2024 Barranquilla Open – Doubles =

Doubles
- 2024 Barranquilla Open

Final
- Champions: (United States) Jessica Failla (Japan) Hiroko Kuwata
- Runners-up: (United States) Quinn Gleason (Brazil) Ingrid Martins
- Score: 4–6, 7–6^{(7–2)}, [10–7]

Events
Singles	Doubles
- Barranquilla Open

Jessica Failla and Hiroko Kuwata won the title, defeating Quinn Gleason and Ingrid Martins in the final, 4–6, 7–6^{(7–2)}, [10–7].

Valentini Grammatikopoulou and Despina Papamichail were the reigning champions, but Grammatikopoulou chose not to participate this year. Papamichail partnered Destanee Aiava, but lost in the semifinals to Failla and Kuwata.

== Seeds ==
1. (United States) Quinn Gleason / (Brazil) Ingrid Martins (final)
2. (Australia) Destanee Aiava / (Greece) Despina Papamichail (semifinals)

== Draw ==
Key

- Q = Qualifier
- WC = Wild card
- LL = Lucky loser
- Alt = Alternate
- ITF = ITF entry
- PR = Protected ranking
- SR = Special ranking
- SE = Special exempt
- JE = Junior exempt
- JR = Junior Accelerator Programme entrant
- CO = College Accelerator Programme entrant
- NG = Next Gen Accelerator Program entrant
- w/o = Walkover
- r = Retired
- d = Defaulted

=== Draw ===
Quarterfinals
1	(United States) Q Gleason (Brazil) I Martins	6	6
(Chinese Taipei) E-s Liang (India) P Thombare	2	4
WC	(Colombia) A Becerra (United States) V Lepchenko
(Colombia) M Herazo González (Colombia) MP Pérez	w/o
(France) E Jacquemot (Argentina) S Sierra	6	4	[4]
Alt	(United States) J Failla (Japan) H Kuwata	3	6	[10]
(United Kingdom) E Appleton (United Kingdom) T Moore	4	4
2	(Australia) D Aiava (Greece) D Papamichail	6	6

Semifinals
1	(United States) Q Gleason (Brazil) I Martins	6	3	[10]
(Colombia) M Herazo González (Colombia) MP Pérez	2	6	[5]
Alt	(United States) J Failla (Japan) H Kuwata	6	6
2	(Australia) D Aiava (Greece) D Papamichail	1	2

Final
1	(United States) Q Gleason (Brazil) I Martins	6	6^{2}	[7]
Alt	(United States) J Failla (Japan) H Kuwata	4	7^{7}	[10]
