= Barranquilla Open =

- 2026 Barranquilla Open

Defunct tennis tournament
- Event name: Kia Open
- Founded: 2022
- Location: Barranquilla, Colombia
- Venue: Parque Distrital de Raquetas
- Category: WTA 125
- Surface: Hard / Outdoor
- Draw: 32S/10Q/8D
- Prize money: $115,000

Current champions (2026)
- Women's singles: (United States) Claire Liu
- Women's doubles: (United States) Rasheeda McAdoo (United States) Anna Rogers

The Barranquilla Open was a tournament for professional female tennis players played on outdoor hardcourts at the Parque Distrital de Raquetas in Barranquilla, Colombia. The event was classified as a WTA 125 tournament since 2023, having been held as a $60k ITF Women's World Tennis Tour in 2022.

== Past finals ==
=== Singles ===
Year	Champion	Runner-up	Score
2022	(Hungary) Panna Udvardy	(Brazil) Laura Pigossi	6–2, 7–5
↓ WTA 125 event ↓
2023	(Germany) Tatjana Maria	(France) Fiona Ferro	6–1, 6–2
2024	(Argentina) Nadia Podoroska	(Germany) Tatjana Maria	6–2, 1–6, 6–3
2025	Not held		
2026	(United States) Claire Liu	(France) Anna Blinkova	6–0, 2–6, 7–5

=== Doubles ===
Year	Champions	Runners-up	Score
2022	(Hungary) Tímea Babos (Ukraine) Kateryna Volodko	(Brazil) Carolina Alves (Ukraine) Valeriya Strakhova	3–6, 7–5, [10–7]
↓ WTA 125 event ↓
2023	(Greece) Valentini Grammatikopoulou (Greece) Despina Papamichail	(Colombia) Yuliana Lizarazo (Colombia) María Paulina Pérez	7–6^{(7–2)}, 7–5
2024	(United States) Jessica Failla (Japan) Hiroko Kuwata	(United States) Quinn Gleason (Brazil) Ingrid Martins	4–6, 7–6^{(7–2)}, [10–7]
2025	Not held		
2026	(United States) Rasheeda McAdoo (United States) Anna Rogers	(United States) Dalayna Hewitt (United States) Alana Smith	7–6^{(7–3)}, 6–3
