= 2007 Fed Cup World Group II =

Part of tennis tournament

The World Group II was the second-highest level of Fed Cup competition in 2007. Winning nations advanced to the World Group play-offs, and the losing nations were demoted to the World Group II play-offs.

== Slovakia vs. Czech Republic ==
Slovakia
0
Sibamac Arena, Bratislava, Slovakia
21–22 April 2007
Red clay (indoors)

Czech Republic
5

| | | | 1 | 2 | 3 |
|---|---|---|---|---|---|---|
| 1 | (Slovakia) (Czech Republic) | Daniela Hantuchová; Lucie Šafářová | 6^{1} 7^{7} | 6; 4 | 3; 6 |
| 2 | (Slovakia) (Czech Republic) | Dominika Cibulková; Nicole Vaidišová | 6; 3 | 4; 6 | 5; 7 |
| 3 | (Slovakia) (Czech Republic) | Daniela Hantuchová; Nicole Vaidišová | 2; 6 | 7^{7} 6^{1} | 3; 6 |
| 4 | (Slovakia) (Czech Republic) | Magdaléna Rybáriková; Barbora Záhlavová-Strýcová | 1; 6 | 1; 2 | | retired |
| 5 | (Slovakia) (Czech Republic) | Janette Husárová / Dominika Cibulková; Iveta Benešová / Barbora Záhlavová-Strýcová | 3; 6 | 3; 6 |

== Germany vs. Croatia ==
Germany
4
TV Fürth 1860 Tennis, Fürth, Germany
21–22 April 2007
Red clay (outdoors)

Croatia
1

| | | | 1 | 2 | 3 |
|---|---|---|---|---|---|
| 1 | (Germany) (Croatia) | Sandra Klösel; Jelena Kostanić Tošić | 3; 6 | 1; 6 |
| 2 | (Germany) (Croatia) | Anna-Lena Grönefeld; Ivana Lisjak | 3; 6 | 6; 3 | 7; 5 |
| 3 | (Germany) (Croatia) | Anna-Lena Grönefeld; Jelena Kostanić Tošić | 6; 4 | 6; 3 |
| 4 | (Germany) (Croatia) | Tatjana Malek; Ivana Lisjak | 6; 2 | 6; 3 |
| 5 | (Germany) (Croatia) | Tatjana Malek / Andrea Petkovic; Jelena Kostanić Tošić / Sanja Ančić | 6; 3 | 6^{7} 7^{9} | 6; 3 |

== Canada vs. Israel ==
Canada
2
Kamloops Fieldhouse, Kamloops, Canada
21–22 April 2007
Taraflex (indoors)

Israel
3

| | | | 1 | 2 | 3 |
|---|---|---|---|---|---|
| 1 | (Canada) (Israel) | Stéphanie Dubois; Shahar Pe'er | 4; 6 | 4; 6 |
| 2 | (Canada) (Israel) | Aleksandra Wozniak; Tzipora Obziler | 4; 6 | 6; 4 | 4; 6 |
| 3 | (Canada) (Israel) | Aleksandra Wozniak; Shahar Pe'er | 4; 6 | 0; 6 |
| 4 | (Canada) (Israel) | Marie-Ève Pelletier; Julia Glushko | 6; 1 | 6; 1 |
| 5 | (Canada) (Israel) | Stéphanie Dubois / Marie-Ève Pelletier; Shahar Pe'er / Tzipora Obziler | 6; 3 | 4; 6 | 7; 5 |

== Austria vs. Australia ==
Austria
4
Messe Dornbirn, Dornbirn, Austria
21–22 April 2007
Red clay (indoors)

Australia
1

| | | | 1 | 2 | 3 |
|---|---|---|---|---|---|
| 1 | (Austria) (Australia) | Tamira Paszek; Samantha Stosur | 6; 1 | 6; 1 |
| 2 | (Austria) (Australia) | Sybille Bammer; Alicia Molik | 7; 5 | 6; 4 |
| 3 | (Austria) (Australia) | Sybille Bammer; Samantha Stosur | 6; 3 | 7; 5 |
| 4 | (Austria) (Australia) | Tamira Paszek; Alicia Molik | 6; 4 | 6; 2 |
| 5 | (Austria) (Australia) | Melanie Klaffner / Yvonne Meusburger; Samantha Stosur / Rennae Stubbs | 4; 6 | 3; 6 |

== See also ==
- Fed Cup structure
