= Beijing Tennis Center =

Tennis venue in Beijing, China

Coordinates: 39°50′56.80″N 116°24′25.60″E

Beijing Tennis Center 北京网球中心
- Guangcai Tennis Center 光彩网球中心
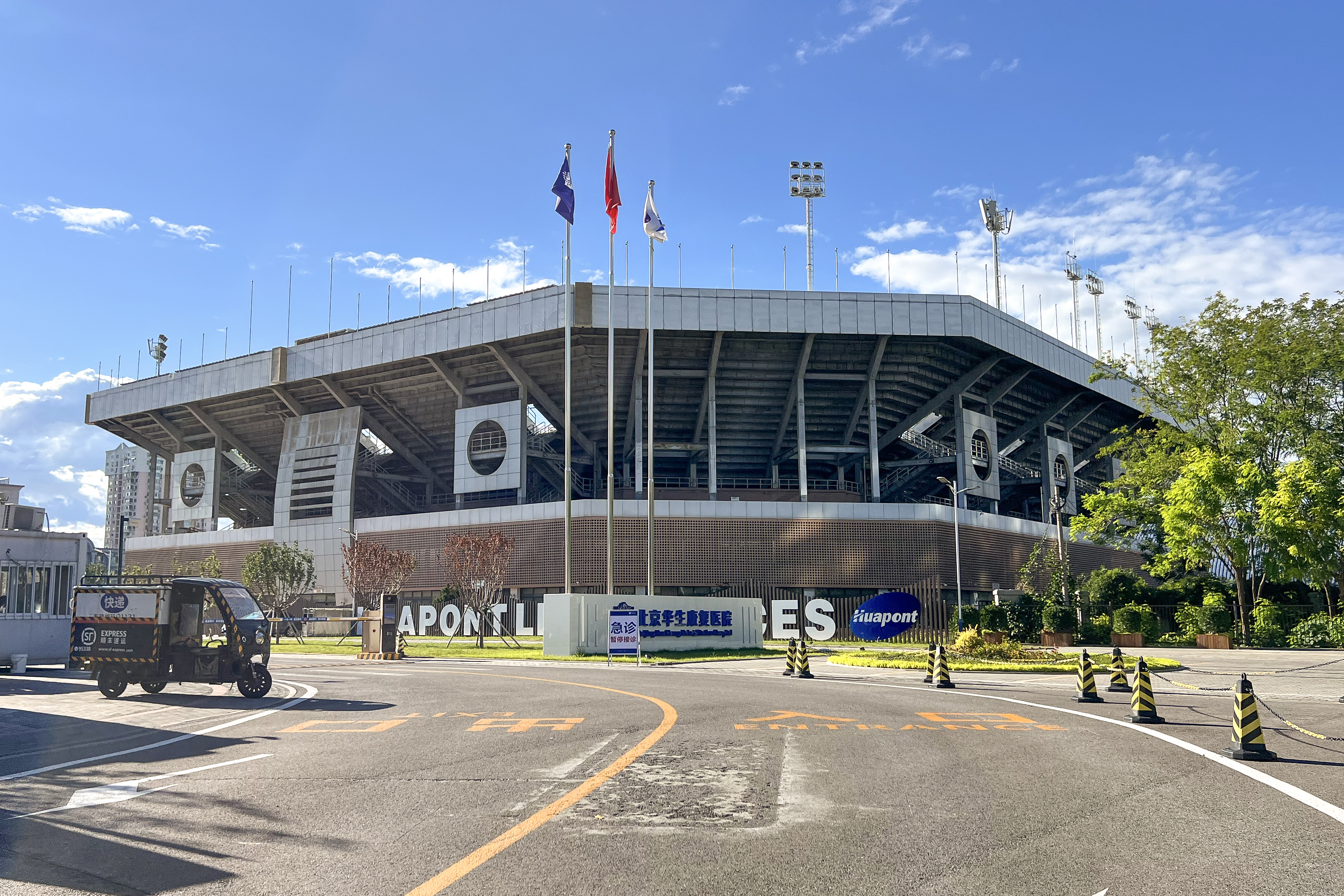
- Interactive map of Beijing Tennis Center 北京网球中心
- Former names: Muxiyuan Tennis Center 木樨园网球中心
- Location: Beijing, China
- Capacity: 10,000 (center court)
- Surface: Hard, outdoor

Tenants
- China Open (2004–2008)

Beijing Tennis Center is a tennis venue in Beijing, China. The courts were built as affiliations of Muxiyuan Sport School. The center hosted the tennis competitions at the 2001 Summer Universiade as Muxiyuan Tennis Center. It then hosted the China Open from 2004 till 2008, when it was given the nickname "Guangcai Tennis Center" because it is located near Guangcai Sport Center. However, it has not hosted the tournament since; in 2009, the China Open was moved to the newer National Tennis Center, with the latter venue hosting the China Open from the 2009 edition onwards. No longer the host of any tennis tournament at the ATP or WTA level, the venue's future is unclear. Its center court has a capacity of 10,000 people.
