= Jessica Failla =

American tennis player (born 1997)

- Full name: Jessica Failla Seelig
- Country (sports): United States
- Born: June 5, 1997 (age 29) Ramona, United States
- Plays: Right (two-handed backhand)
- College: Pepperdine University
- Prize money: $120,684

Singles
- Career record: 198–160
- Career titles: 1 ITF
- Highest ranking: No. 411 (June 19, 2023)
- Current ranking: No. 1,039 (September 28, 2026)

Doubles
- Career record: 94–105
- Career titles: 1 WTA Challenger, 6 ITF
- Highest ranking: No. 124 (July 14, 2025)
- Current ranking: No. 1,131 (September 28, 2026)

Grand Slam doubles results
- US Open: 1R (2024)
- Last updated on: October 2, 2026.

Jessica Failla (born 5 June 1997) is an American tennis player. She is the daughter of Greg Failla, who also was a professional tennis player, and Katrina Crawford.

Failla has a career-high singles ranking by the WTA of 411, achieved on 19 June 2023. She also has a career-high WTA doubles ranking of 124, reached on 14 July 2025.

Failla won her first bigger ITF title at the W50 in Mexico City in the doubles draw, partnering with Jessie Aney.

She played college tennis for the Pepperdine Waves. Failla came to Liberty, after completing her college career at Pepperdine. In August 2023, she joined the Liberty women's tennis team as an assistant coach.

Partnering with Hiroko Kuwata, Failla won the doubles title at the WTA 125 2024 Barranquilla Open, defeating Quinn Gleason and Ingrid Martins in the final.

== WTA 125 finals ==
=== Doubles: 1 (title) ===
Result	Date	Tournament	Surface	Partner	Opponents	Score
Win	Aug 2024	Barranquilla Open, Colombia	Hard	(Japan) Hiroko Kuwata	(United States) Quinn Gleason (Brazil) Ingrid Martins	4–6, 7–6^{(7–2)}, [10–7]

== ITF Circuit finals ==
=== Singles: 3 (1 title, 2 runner-ups) ===
Legend W15 tournaments (1–2)	Finals by surface Hard (1–2)

Result	W–L	Date	Tournament	Tier	Surface	Opponent	Score
Loss	0–1	Jun 2016	ITF Victoria, Canada	W15	Hard	(United States) Katharine Fahey	2–6, 1–6
Loss	0–2	Dec 2019	ITF Norman, United States	W15	Hard	(United States) Kennedy Shaffer	4–6, 6–4, 6–7^{(3)}
Win	1–2	Mar 2024	ITF Montreal, Canada	W15	Hard (i)	(United States) Jessie Aney	6–4, 6–3

=== Doubles: 11 (6 titles, 5 runner-ups) ===
Legend
W100 tournaments (1–0)
W50 tournaments (2–1)
W25/35 tournaments (2–3)
W15 tournaments (1–1)

Result	W–L	Date	Tournament	Tier	Surface	Partner	Opponents	Score
Win	1–0	Nov 2021	ITF Haabneeme, Estonia	W25	Hard (i)	(Japan) Chihiro Muramatsu	(Poland) Maja Chwalińska (Hungary) Adrienn Nagy	6–3, 6–4
Loss	1–1	Jul 2022	ITF Dallas, United States	W25	Hard	(United States) Jessie Aney	Maria Kozyreva; Veronika Miroshnichenko	4–6, 7–6^{(7)}, [5–10]
Loss	1–2	Mar 2023	ITF Sharm El Sheikh, Egypt	W15	Hard	(United States) Anna Ulyashchenko	(United Kingdom) Emilie Lindh; Aleksandra Pospelova	2–6, 6–3, [9–11]
Win	2–2	May 2023	ITF Málaga, Spain	W15	Hard	(Slovakia) Katarína Strešnáková	(United States) Isabella Barrera Aguirre (Spain) Marina Benito	6–3, 6–3
Win	3–2	Feb 2024	ITF Mexico City, Mexico	W50	Hard	(United States) Jessie Aney	(Brazil) Thaisa Grana Pedretti (Mexico) María Portillo Ramírez	3–6, 6–4, [10–8]
Loss	3–3	May 2024	ITF Yecla, Spain	W35	Hard	(Peru) Anastasia Iamachkine	(Hungary) Adrienn Nagy (Germany) Joëlle Steur	3–6, 4–6
Loss	3–4	Oct 2024	ITF Edmonton, Canada	W35	Hard (i)	(United States) Anna Rogers	(Canada) Kayla Cross (United States) Maribella Zamarripa	3–6, 1–6
Win	4–4	Oct 2024	ITF Norman, United States	W35	Hard (i)	(United States) Maribella Zamarripa	(United States) Makenna Jones (South Korea) Park So-hyun	3–6, 6–2, [10–5]
Loss	4–5	Jan 2025	ITF New Delhi, India	W50+H	Hard	(United States) Jessie Aney	(United Kingdom) Naiktha Bains (India) Ankita Raina	4–6, 6–3, [8–10]
Win	5–5	Jan 2025	ITF Bengaluru Open, India	W100	Hard	(United States) Jessie Aney	Amina Anshba; Elena Pridankina	6–2, 4–6, [10–6]
Win	6–5	Mar 2025	ITF Chihuahua, Mexico	W50	Clay	(United States) Jessie Aney	(Greece) Eleni Christofi (Greece) Despina Papamichail	6–3, 7–5
