= Tatjana Maria =

German tennis player (born 1987)

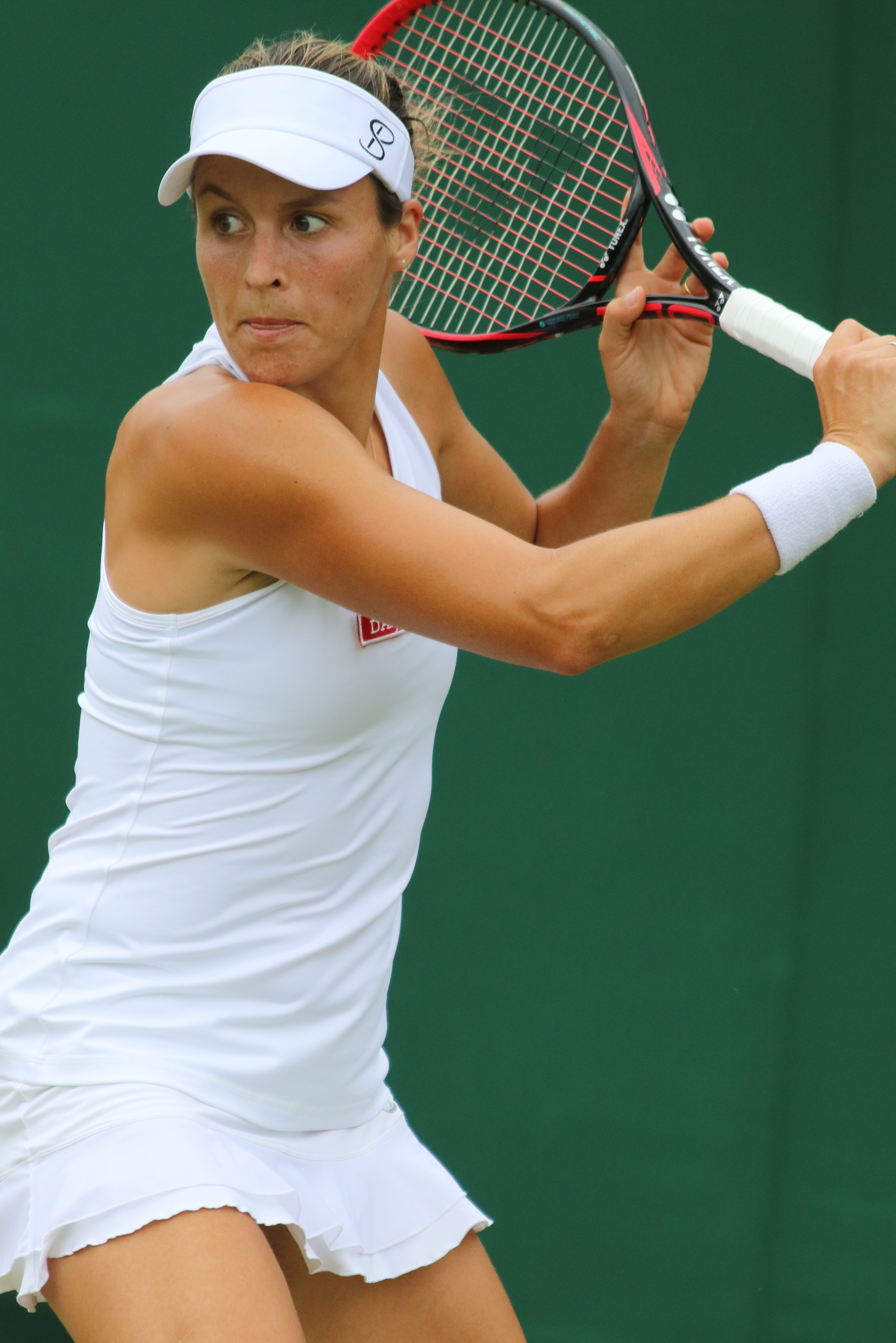
- Maria at the 2017 Wimbledon Championships
- Country (sports): Germany
- Born: 8 August 1987 (age 39) Bad Saulgau, West Germany
- Height: 1.72 m (5 ft 8 in)
- Turned pro: 2001
- Plays: Right-handed (one-handed backhand)
- Coach: Charles-Edouard Maria
- Prize money: $7,687,432

Singles
- Career record: 745–595
- Career titles: 4
- Highest ranking: No. 36 (14 July 2025)
- Current ranking: No. 68 (9 November 2026)

Grand Slam singles results
- Australian Open: 2R (2009, 2016, 2024, 2025)
- French Open: 2R (2016, 2017)
- Wimbledon: SF (2022)
- US Open: 2R (2012, 2017, 2018, 2024, 2026)

Other tournaments
- Olympic Games: 1R (2024)

Doubles
- Career record: 274–256
- Career titles: 4
- Highest ranking: No. 54 (6 June 2016)
- Current ranking: No. 173 (9 November 2026)

Grand Slam doubles results
- Australian Open: 2R (2017)
- French Open: 3R (2016)
- Wimbledon: QF (2018)
- US Open: 3R (2023, 2026)

Other doubles tournaments
- Olympic Games: 1R (2024)

Grand Slam mixed doubles results
- US Open: Q1 (2026)

Team competitions
- Fed Cup: SF (2018), record 13–10
- Last updated on: 11 November 2026.

Tatjana Maria (née Malek; born 8 August 1987) is a German professional tennis player. In July 2025, she reached her career-best singles ranking of world No. 36 at 37 years and 11 months old. In June 2016, she peaked at No. 54 in the doubles rankings.

She has won four singles titles and four doubles titles on the WTA Tour, as well as two singles titles on the Challenger Tour. She has also won 19 singles and 15 doubles titles on the ITF Circuit. She has played 1340 singles matches, the third highest number of tennis matches in the Open Era, behind only Martina Navratilova and Chris Evert.

She won three of her four WTA Tour titles after becoming a mother and after turning 34, winning her biggest title (a WTA 500) aged 37.

== Career ==
=== 2013–2016: Wimbledon third round, top 100 debut ===
Maria took a sabbatical in 2013, to have her first child, and returned to tour at the 2014 Copa Colsanitas.

=== 2017–2020: Top 50, first WTA Tour title ===
Maria reached a career-high ranking in the top 50 in November 2017.

She won her first singles WTA Tour title at the 2018 Mallorca Open defeating Anastasija Sevastova.

=== 2022: First major semifinal at Wimbledon ===
Maria won her second title at the 2022 Copa Colsanitas, defeating Laura Pigossi in the final.

At the Wimbledon Championships she defeated Astra Sharma, Sorana Cîrstea and then world No. 5, Maria Sakkari (her fifth top 10 win), and, in the round of 16, the 12th-seeded Jeļena Ostapenko, winning after saving two match points. This made her the oldest player to debut in a Wimbledon quarterfinal. In the quarterfinals, she beat compatriot Jule Niemeier who was ranked 97th, in three sets. She became the sixth female player in the Open era to reach the Wimbledon semifinal after the age of 34, and only the sixth woman from Germany to reach the tournament's semifinal. She lost her semifinal match to the second seed and world No. 2, Ons Jabeur, in three sets. She was the first mother-of-two to make the last four of a major since Margaret Court at Wimbledon 1975, and only the fourth player ranked outside the top 100 to reach the Wimbledon semifinals. She was awarded the WTA Comeback Player of the Year for her performance in 2022.

=== 2023–2024: Third title, Olympics qualification ===
Maria defended her title at the 2023 Copa Colsanitas in Bogotá by defeating Peyton Stearns in the final.

At the 2024 Copa Colsanitas, she could not defend her title losing to local favorite and 2021 champion, Camila Osorio, in the quarterfinals and fell down to No. 65 in the singles rankings.

She was selected as the German No. 2 player for the 2024 Paris Olympics.

=== 2025–2026: Oldest WTA 500 champion ===
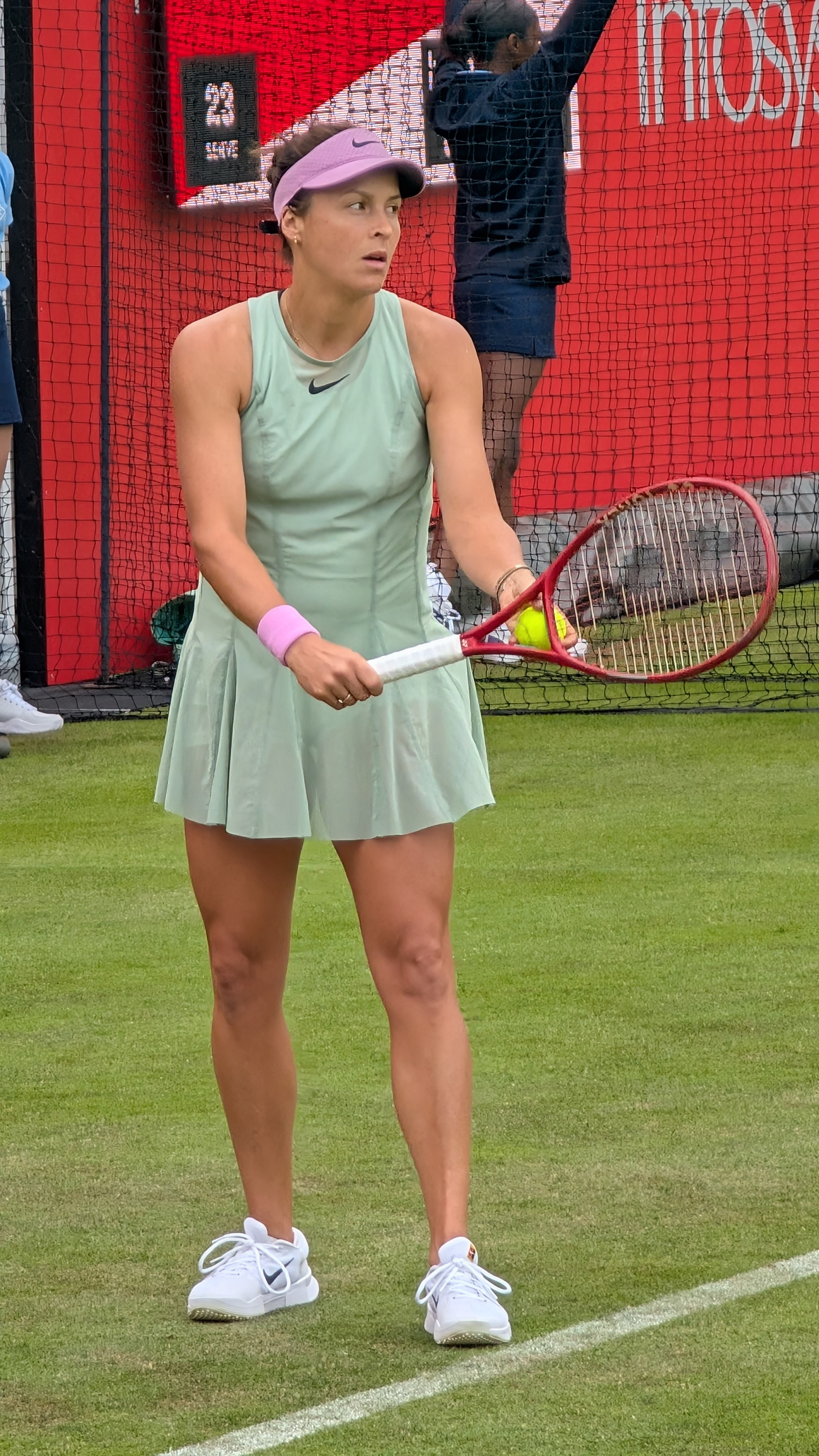
Tatjana Maria at Queen's qualifying 2026

At age 37 and 312 days, at the 2025 Queen's Club Championships, Maria became the oldest woman to reach a WTA 500 final and the oldest WTA singles finalist since Serena Williams won the 2020 title in Auckland at age 38. Maria defeated Amanda Anisimova to become the "Queen of Queen's" and win her first WTA 500 title and second on grass, the first woman champion at Queen's Club for over half a century, having come through qualifying to earn the right to play the tournament. She was also the oldest ever winner of a WTA 500 event.

The following month, she was runner-up at the WTA 125 Hall of Fame Open, losing to Caty McNally in the final.

In June 2026, Maria was not awarded a wildcard to Queen's, despite being the defending champion, after her world ranking of 52 was not high enough to gain direct entry into the draw. Instead, she won two rounds of qualifying to reach the main draw where she lost in the second round to top seed Elena Rybakina. Later that month, she became the oldest ever finalist at the Eastbourne Open, aged 38, where she was beaten to the title by Madison Keys.

== Personal life ==
Her father Heinrich Malek (Polish: Henryk Małek) was a Polish international handball player originally from Zabrze.

On 8 April 2013, she married her coach, the French former tennis player Charles-Edouard Maria. Their first child, a daughter (Charlotte), was born in December 2013, and their second daughter was born in April 2021.

== Performance timelines ==
Key
W	F	SF	QF	#R	RR	Q#	P#	DNQ	A	Z#	PO	G	S	B	NMS	NTI	P	NH

(W) winner; (F) finalist; (SF) semifinalist; (QF) quarterfinalist; (#R) rounds 4, 3, 2, 1; (RR) round-robin stage; (Q#) qualification round; (P#) preliminary round; (DNQ) did not qualify; (A) absent; (Z#) Davis/Fed Cup Zonal Group (with number indication) or (PO) play-off; (G) gold, (S) silver or (B) bronze Olympic/Paralympic medal; (NMS) not a Masters tournament; (NTI) not a Tier I tournament; (P) postponed; (NH) not held; (SR) strike rate (events won / competed); (W–L) win–loss record.
To avoid confusion and double counting, these charts are updated at the conclusion of a tournament or when the player's participation has ended.

Only main-draw results in WTA Tour, Grand Slam tournaments, Olympic Games and Billie Jean King Cup are included in win–loss records.

=== Singles ===
Current through the 2026 Guadalajara Open.

Tournament	2005	2006	2007	2008	2009	2010	2011	2012	2013	2014	2015	2016	2017	2018	2019	2020	2021	2022	2023	2024	2025	2026	SR	W–L	Win %
Grand Slam tournaments
Australian Open	A	A	Q1	1R	2R	1R	Q1	A	Q3	A	1R	2R	Q2	1R	1R	1R	A	1R	1R	2R	2R	1R	0 / 13	4–13	24%
French Open	A	A	A	A	Q3	1R	Q1	Q3	1R	A	1R	2R	2R	1R	1R	A	A	1R	1R	1R	1R	1R	0 / 12	2–12	14%
Wimbledon	A	A	1R	A	2R	1R	Q1	Q2	1R	A	3R	1R	2R	2R	1R	NH	A	SF	1R	1R	1R	2R	0 / 14	11–14	44%
US Open	A	A	1R	A	1R	Q1	Q2	2R	A	Q2	1R	Q3	2R	2R	1R	1R	Q1	1R	1R	2R	1R	2R	0 / 13	5–13	28%
Win–loss	0–0	0–0	0–2	0–1	2–3	0–3	0–0	1–1	0–2	0–0	2–4	2–3	3–3	2–4	0–4	0–2	0–0	5–4	0–4	2–4	1–4	2–4	0 / 52	22–52	30%
National representation
Olympic Games	not held			A	not held			A	not held			A	not held				A	not held		1R	not held		0 / 1	0–1	0%
BJK Cup (Note: Formerly known as Fed Cup until 2020.)	A	PO	PO	1R	PO	1R	PO	A	A	A	A	A	A	SF	1R	QR	A	A	RR	1R	QR	A	0 / 6	8–8	50%
WTA 1000 + former Tier I tournaments
Qatar Open	NTI			A	NH		NTI	A	A	A	NTI	A	NTI	1R	NTI	A	NTI	A	NTI	1R	A	1R	0 / 3	0–3	0%
Dubai Open	NTI				A	A	Q2	NTI			A	NTI	A	NTI	A	NTI	A	NTI	A	2R	A	1R	0 / 2	1–2	33%
Indian Wells Open	A	A	Q2	1R	Q2	1R	Q1	A	A	A	Q1	1R	1R	1R	2R	NH	Q1	Q1	2R	2R	1R	1R	0 / 10	3–10	23%
Miami Open	A	A	A	A	Q2	1R	Q1	A	Q2	A	3R	Q2	Q1	1R	4R	NH	A	Q2	1R	1R	Q2	1R	0 / 7	5–7	42%
Madrid Open	NH				A	A	A	A	A	A	A	A	A	A	Q1	NH	A	A	2R	2R	Q1	1R	0 / 3	2–3	40%
Italian Open	A	A	A	A	A	A	A	A	A	A	A	Q1	A	A	Q1	A	A	A	1R	2R	Q1	2R	0 / 3	2–3	40%
Canadian Open	A	A	A	A	Q1	A	A	A	A	A	A	A	Q2	1R	2R	NH	A	Q2	A	1R	1R	1R	0 / 5	1–5	17%
Cincinnati Open	NTI				1R	A	A	A	A	A	Q2	A	A	2R	A	A	A	Q1	A	A	2R	2R	0 / 4	3–4	43%
China Open	NTI				A	A	A	A	A	A	A	1R	A	Q2	A	NH			2R	Q1	1R	A	0 / 3	1–3	25%
Wuhan Open	NH									A	A	Q1	A	A	A	NH				A	A	A	0 / 0	0–0	–
German Open	Q1	Q1	2R	A	NH / NTI																		0 / 1	1–1	50%
Win–loss	0–0	0–0	1–1	0–1	0–1	0–2	0–0	0–0	0–0	0–0	2–1	0–2	0–1	1–5	5–3	0–0	0–0	0–0	3–5	4–7	1–4	2–8	0 / 41	19–41	32%
Career statistics
	2005	2006	2007	2008	2009	2010	2011	2012	2013	2014	2015	2016	2017	2018	2019	2020	2021	2022	2023	2024	2025	2026	Career		
Tournaments	0	2	11	7	9	16	2	3	6	3	16	15	17	24	20	5	0	11	26	27	20	25	Career total: 265		
Titles	0	0	0	0	0	0	0	0	0	0	0	0	0	1	0	0	0	1	1	0	1	0	Career total: 4		
Finals	0	0	0	0	0	0	0	0	0	0	0	0	0	1	0	0	0	1	1	0	1	1	Career total: 5		
Hard win–loss	0–0	1–2	0–3	1–6	2–5	4–8	0–2	1–2	1–2	0–1	3–5	1–8	4–8	5–17	8–13	2–5	0–0	6–6	13–17	8–15	7–13	4–14	0 / 148	71–152	32%
Clay win–loss	0–0	0–0	4–6	0–2	3–4	4–8	0–0	0–0	0–3	0–1	4–7	3–6	6–6	2–4	1–6	1–0	0–0	5–1	10–6	5–9	2–6	6–7	2 / 80	56–82	41%
Grass win–loss	0–0	0–0	1–2	0–0	1–1	0–1	0–0	0–0	0–1	0–0	3–3	0–1	1–2	6–2	3–2	0–0	0–0	6–3	1–3	1–3	5–2	8–4	2 / 32	36–30	55%
Carpet win–loss	0–0	0–0	2–0	0–0	0–0	0–0	0–0	1–1	0–0	2–1	0–1	0–0	3–1	0–1	discontinued								0 / 5	8–5	62%
Overall win–loss	0–0	1–2	7–11	1–8	6–10	8–17	0–2	2–3	1–6	2–3	10–16	4–15	14–17	13–24	12–21	3–5	0–0	17–10	24–26	14–27	14–21	18–25	4 / 265	171–269	39%
Win %	–	33%	39%	11%	38%	32%	0%	40%	14%	40%	38%	21%	45%	35%	36%	38%	–	63%	48%	34%	40%	42%	Career total: 39%		
Year-end ranking	284	146	88	272	68	137	191	112	258	214	68	116	46	79	90	109	279	68	57	101	41	68			

=== Doubles ===
Tournament	2005	2006	2007	2008	2009	2010	2011	2012	2013	2014	2015	2016	2017	2018	2019	2020	2021	2022	2023	2024	2025	2026	SR	W–L	Win%
Grand Slam tournaments
Australian Open	A	A	A	A	A	1R	1R	A	1R	A	1R	1R	2R	1R	1R	1R	A	1R	1R	1R	A	1R	0 / 13	1–13	7%
French Open	A	A	A	A	A	1R	A	A	1R	2R	2R	3R	A	2R	1R	A	A	1R	1R	A	1R	2R	0 / 11	6–11	35%
Wimbledon	A	A	2R	A	1R	1R	A	A	1R	A	1R	2R	2R	QF	A	NH	A	1R	1R	1R	A	A	0 / 11	5–11	31%
US Open	A	A	A	A	2R	1R	A	2R	A	A	1R	1R	1R	1R	1R	A	A	A	3R	1R	1R	3R	0 / 12	6–12	33%
Win–loss	0–0	0–0	1–1	0–0	1–2	0–4	0–1	1–1	0–3	1–1	1–4	3–4	2–3	3–4	0–3	0–1	0–0	0–3	2–4	0–3	0–2	3–3	0 / 47	18–47	28%
National representation
Olympic Games	not held			A	not held			A	not held			A	not held				A	not held		1R	not held		0 / 1	0–1	0%
BJK Cup	A	PO	PO	1R	PO	1R	PO	A	A	A	A	A	A	SF	1R	QR	A	A	RR	1R	QR	A	0 / 6	5–2	71%
WTA 1000 + former Tier I tournaments
Dubai Open	NTI				A	A	1R	NTI			A	NTI	A	NTI	A	NTI	A	NTI	A	A	A	A	0 / 1	0–1	0%
Miami Open	A	A	A	A	A	A	A	A	2R	A	1R	A	A	2R	A	NH	A	A	A	A	A	A	0 / 3	2–3	40%
Italian Open	A	A	A	A	A	A	A	A	A	A	A	1R	A	A	A	A	A	A	A	A	A	A	0 / 1	0–1	0%
Canadian Open	A	A	A	A	A	A	A	A	A	A	A	A	A	1R	A	NH	A	A	A	A	A	A	0 / 1	0–1	0%
Cincinnati Open	NTI				A	A	A	A	A	A	1R	A	A	A	A	A	A	A	A	A	A	A	0 / 1	0–1	0%
China Open	NTI				A	A	A	A	A	A	A	1R	A	A	A	NH			A	A	A	A	0 / 1	0–1	0%
Wuhan Open	NH									A	A	1R	A	A	A	NH				A	A	A	0 / 1	0–1	0%
German Open	1R	Q1	1R	A	NH / NTI																		0 / 2	0–2	0%
Win–loss	0–1	0–0	0–1	0–0	0–0	0–0	0–1	0–0	1–1	0–0	0–2	0–3	0–0	1–2	0–0	0–0	0–0	0–0	0–0	0–0	0–0	0–0	0 / 11	2–11	15%
Career statistics
Titles	0	0	0	0	0	0	0	1	0	0	0	1	0	1	1	0	0	0	0	0	0	0	Career total: 4		
Finals	0	0	0	0	1	0	0	1	0	1	1	2	0	1	1	0	0	0	0	0	0	0	Career total: 8		
Year-end ranking	371	245	121	372	87	101	138	80	131	107	80	63	206	87	163	165	309	542	307	1040	1256	173			

== WTA Tour finals ==
=== Singles: 5 (4 titles, 1 runner-up) ===
Legend WTA 500 (1–0) WTA 250 (Note: The WTA International tournaments were reclassified as WTA 250 tournaments in 2021.) (3–1)	Finals by surface Clay (2–0) Grass (2–1)

Result	W–L	Date	Tournament	Tier	Surface	Opponent	Score
Win	1–0	Jun 2018	Mallorca Open, Spain	International	Grass	(Latvia) Anastasija Sevastova	6–4, 7–5
Win	2–0	Apr 2022	Copa Colsanitas, Colombia	WTA 250	Clay	(Brazil) Laura Pigossi	6–3, 4–6, 6–2
Win	3–0	Apr 2023	Copa Colsanitas, Colombia (2)	WTA 250	Clay	(United States) Peyton Stearns	6–3, 2–6, 6–4
Win	4–0	Jun 2025	Queen's Club Championships, UK	WTA 500	Grass	(United States) Amanda Anisimova	6–3, 6–4
Loss	4–1	Jun 2026	Eastbourne Open, UK	WTA 250	Grass	(United States) Madison Keys	5–7, 4–6

=== Doubles: 8 (4 titles, 4 runner-ups) ===
Legend WTA 250 (4–4)	Finals by surface Hard (2–1) Clay (1–3) Carpet (1–0)

Result	W–L	Date	Tournament	Tier	Surface	Partner	Opponents	Score
Loss	0–1	Jul 2009	Gastein Ladies, Austria	International	Clay	(Germany) Andrea Petkovic	(Czech Republic) Andrea Hlaváčková (Czech Republic) Lucie Hradecká	2–6, 4–6
Win	1–1	Sep 2012	Tournoi de Québec, Canada	International	Carpet (i)	(France) Kristina Mladenovic	(Poland) Alicja Rosolska (United Kingdom) Heather Watson	7–6^{(7–5)}, 6–7^{(6–8)}, [10–7]
Loss	1–2	Oct 2014	Japan Women's Open, Japan	International	Hard	(Spain) Lara Arruabarrena	(Japan) Shuko Aoyama (Czech Republic) Renata Voráčová	1–6, 2–6
Loss	1–3	Jul 2015	Bastad Open, Sweden	International	Clay	(Ukraine) Olga Savchuk	(Netherlands) Kiki Bertens (Sweden) Johanna Larsson	5–7, 4–6
Win	2–3	Apr 2016	Copa Colsanitas, Colombia	International	Clay	(Spain) Lara Arruabarrena	(Brazil) Gabriela Cé (Venezuela) Andrea Gámiz	6–2, 4–6, [10–8]
Loss	2–4	Apr 2016	Rabat Grand Prix, Morocco	International	Clay	(Romania) Raluca Olaru	(Switzerland) Xenia Knoll (Serbia) Aleksandra Krunić	3–6, 0–6
Win	3–4	Mar 2018	Abierto Mexicano, Mexico	International	Hard	(United Kingdom) Heather Watson	(United States) Kaitlyn Christian (United States) Sabrina Santamaria	7–5, 2–6, [10–2]
Win	4–4	Sep 2019	Korea Open, South Korea	International	Hard	(Spain) Lara Arruabarrena	(United States) Hayley Carter (Brazil) Luisa Stefani	7–6^{(9–7)}, 3–6, [10–7]

== WTA 125 finals ==
=== Singles: 7 (2 titles, 5 runner-ups) ===
Result	W–L	Date	Tournament	Surface	Opponent	Score
Loss	0–1	Jun 2023	Veneto Open, Italy	Grass	(United States) Ashlyn Krueger	6–3, 4–6, 5–7
Win	1–1	Aug 2023	Barranquilla Open, Colombia	Hard	(France) Fiona Ferro	6–1, 6–2
Loss	1–2	Aug 2024	Barranquilla Open, Colombia	Hard	(Argentina) Nadia Podoroska	2–6, 6–1, 3–6
Loss	1–3	Sep 2024	Abierto Zapopan, Mexico	Hard	Kamilla Rakhimova	3–6, 7–6^{(7–5)}, 3–6
Loss	1–4	Jul 2025	Hall of Fame Open, United States	Grass	(United States) Caty McNally	6–2, 4–6, 2–6
Win	2–4	Jul 2026	Hall of Fame Open, United States	Grass	(United States) Katie Volynets	6–2, 6–4
Loss	2–5	Nov 2026	Querétaro Open, Mexico	Clay	(Canada) Bianca Andreescu	1–6, 6–2, 3–6

=== Doubles: 1 (runner-up) ===
Result	W–L	Date	Tournament	Surface	Partner	Opponents	Score
Loss	0–1	Nov 2015	Carlsbad Open, United States	Hard	(Georgia (country)) Oksana Kalashnikova	(Paraguay) Verónica Cepede Royg (Brazil) Gabriela Cé	6–1, 4–6, [8–10]

== ITF Circuit finals ==
=== Singles: 34 (20 titles, 14 runner-ups) ===
Legend $100,000 tournaments (7–5) $50/60,000 tournaments (5–1) $40,000 tournaments (1–0) $25,000 tournaments (6–7) $10,000 tournaments (1–1)	Finals by surface Hard (14–4) Clay (3–8) Grass (2–2) Carpet (1–0)

Result	W–L	Date	Tournament	Tier	Surface	Opponent	Score
Loss	0–1	Feb 2006	Biberach Open, Germany	25,000	Hard (i)	(Germany) Kristina Barrois	4–6, 7–5, 6–7^{(5–7)}
Loss	0–2	Jun 2006	ITF Davos, Switzerland	10,000	Clay	(Bosnia and Herzegovina) Sandra Martinović	6–1, 4–6, 2–6
Win	1–2	Jul 2006	ITF Les Contamines, France	25,000	Hard	(Czech Republic) Sandra Záhlavová	6–3, 6–4
Win	2–2	Aug 2006	Ladies Open Hechingen, Germany	25,000	Clay	(Romania) Magda Mihalache	6–2, 6–3
Loss	2–3	Sep 2006	ITF Gliwice, Poland	25,000	Clay	(Czech Republic) Sandra Záhlavová	4–6, 0–6
Loss	2–4	Oct 2006	ITF Istanbul, Turkey	25,000	Hard (i)	(Denmark) Caroline Wozniacki	2–6, 1–6
Loss	2–5	Apr 2007	Open de Cagnes-sur-Mer, France	100,000	Clay	(Switzerland) Timea Bacsinszky	4–6, 1–6
Win	3–5	Oct 2007	Slovak Open, Slovakia	100,000	Hard (i)	(Czech Republic) Petra Kvitová	6–2, 7–6^{(9–7)}
Win	4–5	Nov 2008	Ismaning Open, Germany	50,000	Carpet (i)	(Germany) Kristina Barrois	6–2, 6–3
Win	5–5	Feb 2009	ITF Stockholm, Sweden	25,000	Hard (i)	(Hungary) Anikó Kapros	6–3, 6–2
Win	6–5	May 2009	ITF Makarska, Croatia	50,000	Clay	(Romania) Simona Halep	6–1, 4–6, 6–4
Win	7–5	Aug 2009	Bronx Open, United States	100,000	Hard	(Germany) Kristina Barrois	6–1, 6–4
Loss	7–6	Jul 2011	ITF Bad Saulgau, Germany	25,000	Clay	(Romania) Raluca Olaru	6–3, 3–6, 5–7
Win	8–6	Aug 2011	Ladies Open Hechingen, Germany	25,000	Clay	(Germany) Sarah Gronert	6–3, 6–4
Loss	8–7	Oct 2011	ITF Clermont-Ferrand, France	25,000	Hard (i)	(Czech Republic) Andrea Hlaváčková	4–6, 6–0, 6–7^{(6–8)}
Loss	8–8	Apr 2012	ITF Tessenderlo, Belgium	25,000	Clay (i)	(Ukraine) Maryna Zanevska	2–6, 2–6
Loss	8–9	Jun 2012	Nottingham Open, United Kingdom	50,000	Grass	(Australia) Ashleigh Barty	1–6, 1–6
Loss	8–10	Sep 2012	ITF Clermont-Ferrand, France	25,000	Hard (i)	(Switzerland) Stefanie Vögele	4–6, 1–6
Win	9–10	Aug 2014	ITF Fort Worth, United States	10,000	Hard	(United States) Hayley Carter	6–1, 6–1
Win	10–10	Oct 2014	ITF Makinohara, Japan	25,000	Grass	(Japan) Shuko Aoyama	6–1, 6–2
Win	11–10	Dec 2014	ITF Mérida, Mexico	25,000	Hard	(Mexico) Victoria Rodríguez	6–0, 6–3
Win	12–10	Feb 2015	Midland Classic, United States	100,000	Hard (i)	(United States) Louisa Chirico	6–2, 6–0
Loss	12–11	May 2015	Open de Cagnes-sur-Mer, France	100,000	Clay	(Germany) Carina Witthöft	5–7, 1–6
Win	13–11	Nov 2015	Toronto Challenger, Canada	50,000	Hard (i)	(Serbia) Jovana Jakšić	6–3, 6–2
Win	14–11	Feb 2017	Midland Classic, United States	100,000	Hard (i)	(United Kingdom) Naomi Broady	6–4, 6–7^{(6–8)}, 6–4
Loss	14–12	Jun 2017	Open de Marseille, France	100,000	Clay	(Italy) Jasmine Paolini	4–6, 6–2, 1–6
Win	15–12	Jun 2017	Southsea Trophy, United Kingdom	100,000	Grass	(Romania) Irina-Camelia Begu	6–2, 6–2
Loss	15–13	Jul 2017	Contrexéville Open, France	100,000	Clay	(Sweden) Johanna Larsson	1–6, 4–6
Win	16–13	Feb 2022	Georgia's Rome Open, United States	60,000	Hard (i)	(United States) Alycia Parks	6–4, 4–6, 6–2
Win	17–13	Jan 2023	ITF Pune, India	40,000	Hard	(Uzbekistan) Nigina Abduraimova	6–1, 6–1
Loss	17–14	Jun 2024	Surbiton Trophy, United Kingdom	100,000	Grass	(Belgium) Alison Van Uytvanck	7–6^{(7–5)}, 1–6, 2–6
Win	18–14	Dec 2024	Trnava Indoor, Slovakia	60,000	Hard (i)	(United Kingdom) Jodie Burrage	6–4, 6–1
Win	19–14	Jan 2025	ITF Bengaluru Open, India	100,000	Hard	(France) Léolia Jeanjean	6–7^{(0–7)}, 6–3, 6–4
Win	20–14	Sep 2026	Central Coast Open, United States	100,000	Hard	(United States) Madison Brengle	6–3, 6–4

=== Doubles: 25 (15 titles, 10 runner-ups) ===
Legend $100,000 tournaments (0–3) $75,000 tournaments (0–2) $50,000 tournaments (5–2) $25,000 tournaments (9–2) $10,000 tournaments (1–1)	Finals by surface Hard (5–5) Clay (8–4) Grass (1–0) Carpet (1–1)

Result	W–L	Date	Tournament	Tier	Surface	Partner	Opponents	Score
Win	1–0	May 2003	ITF Warsaw, Poland	10,000	Clay	(Germany) Annette Kolb	(Czech Republic) Barbora Machovská (Czech Republic) Ivana Plateniková	6–3, 6–3
Loss	1–1	Aug 2004	ITF Westende, Belgium	10,000	Hard	(Czech Republic) Janette Bejlková	(Czech Republic) Veronika Chvojková (Finland) Emma Laine	4–6, 5–7
Loss	1–2	Sep 2006	Save Cup Mestre, Italy	50,000	Clay	(Georgia (country)) Margalita Chakhnashvili	(Romania) Monica Niculescu (Czech Republic) Renata Voráčová	4–6, 6–3, 4–6
Win	2–2	May 2009	ITF Makarska, Croatia	50,000	Clay	(Czech Republic) Renata Voráčová	(Czech Republic) Tereza Hladíková (Poland) Karolina Kosińska	6–4, 5–7, [10–6]
Loss	2–3	Sep 2010	Sofia Cup, Bulgaria	100,000	Clay	(Austria) Sandra Klemenschits	(Greece) Eleni Daniilidou (Germany) Jasmin Wöhr	3–6, 4–6
Loss	2–4	Oct 2010	GB Pro-Series Barnstaple, United Kingdom	75,000	Hard (i)	(Austria) Sandra Klemenschits	(Czech Republic) Andrea Hlaváčková (Netherlands) Michaëlla Krajicek	6–7^{(4–7)}, 2–6
Win	3–4	Oct 2010	Open de Touraine, France	50,000	Hard (i)	(France) Irena Pavlovic	(France) Stéphanie Cohen-Aloro (Tunisia) Selima Sfar	6–4, 5–7, [10–8]
Win	4–4	Oct 2010	Open de Saint-Raphaël, France	50,000	Hard (i)	(Austria) Sandra Klemenschits	(Spain) Estrella Cabeza Candela (Spain) Laura Pous Tió	6–2, 6–4
Win	5–4	Apr 2011	ITF Tessenderlo, Belgium	25,000	Clay (i)	(Germany) Anna-Lena Grönefeld	(Ukraine) Elina Svitolina (Ukraine) Maryna Zanevska	7–5, 6–3
Win	6–4	Jun 2011	Bella Cup Toruń, Poland	50,000	Clay	(France) Stéphanie Foretz Gacon	(Romania) Edina Gallovits-Hall (Slovenia) Andreja Klepač	6–2, 7–5
Win	7–4	Aug 2011	Ladies Open Hechingen, Germany	25,000	Clay	(Austria) Sandra Klemenschits	(Germany) Korina Perkovic (Germany) Laura Siegemund	4–6, 6–2, [10–7]
Loss	7–5	Oct 2011	GB Pro-Series Barnstaple, United Kingdom	75,000	Hard (i)	(Austria) Sandra Klemenschits	(Czech Republic) Eva Birnerová (United Kingdom) Anne Keothavong	5–7, 1–6
Win	8–5	Mar 2012	GB Pro-Series Bath, United Kingdom	25,000	Hard (i)	(Liechtenstein) Stephanie Vogt	(France) Julie Coin (United Kingdom) Melanie South	6–3, 3–6, [10–3]
Loss	8–6	Apr 2012	ITF Tessenderlo, Belgium	25,000	Clay (i)	(Liechtenstein) Stephanie Vogt	(Netherlands) Demi Schuurs (Ukraine) Maryna Zanevska	4–6, 3–6
Win	9–6	Jun 2012	ITF Stuttgart, Germany	25,000	Clay	(Austria) Sandra Klemenschits	(Slovakia) Lenka Juríková (Slovakia) Zuzana Luknárová	6–3, 6–2
Loss	9–7	Jul 2012	ITF Biella, Italy	100,000	Clay	(Austria) Sandra Klemenschits	(Czech Republic) Eva Hrdinová (Bosnia and Herzegovina) Mervana Jugić-Salkić	6–1, 3–6, [8–10]
Loss	9–8	Oct 2012	ITF Poitiers, France	100,000	Hard (i)	(France) Stéphanie Foretz Gacon	(Colombia) Catalina Castaño (Bosnia and Herzegovina) Mervana Jugić-Salkić	4–6, 7–5, [4–10]
Win	10–8	Apr 2013	Dothan Pro Classic, United States	50,000	Clay	(United States) Julia Cohen	(United States) Irina Falconi (United States) Maria Sanchez	6–4, 4–6, [11–9]
Win	11–8	Jun 2014	ITF Essen, Germany	25,000	Clay	(Germany) Kristina Barrois	(Belgium) Ysaline Bonaventure (Bulgaria) Elitsa Kostova	6–2, 6–2
Win	12–8	Oct 2014	ITF Makinohara, Japan	25,000	Grass	(Japan) Miki Miyamura	(Japan) Makoto Ninomiya (Japan) Mari Tanaka	6–3, 6–1
Win	13–8	Oct 2014	ITF Hamamatsu, Japan	25,000	Carpet	(Japan) Miki Miyamura	(Japan) Makoto Ninomiya (Japan) Mari Tanaka	5–7, 6–2, [10–5]
Loss	13–9	Oct 2014	Toronto Challenger, Canada	50,000	Hard (i)	(Canada) Gabriela Dabrowski	(United States) Maria Sanchez (United States) Taylor Townsend	5–7, 6–4, [13–15]
Win	14–9	Dec 2014	ITF Mérida, Mexico	25,000	Hard	(Mexico) Renata Zarazúa	(United States) Jan Abaza (Chinese Taipei) Hsu Chieh-yu	7–6^{(7–1)}, 6–1
Win	15–9	Dec 2014	ITF Mérida, Mexico	25,000	Hard	(Mexico) Renata Zarazúa	(Venezuela) Andrea Gámiz (Russia) Valeria Savinykh	6–4, 6–1
Loss	15–10	Feb 2015	AK Ladies Open, Germany	25,000	Carpet (i)	(Austria) Sandra Klemenschits	(Germany) Antonia Lottner (Croatia) Ana Vrljić	4–6, 6–3, [9–11]

== Wins over top-10 players ==
Maria has a 6–21 win-loss record against players who were, at the time the match was played, ranked in the top 10.

Season	2010	...	2015	...	2018	2019	...	2022	...	2025	Total
Wins	1		1		1	1		1		1	6

#	Player	Rank	Event	Surface	Rd	Score	Rank
2010
1.	(China) Li Na	10	Malaysian Open, Malaysia	Hard	1R	6–1, 5–7, 6–2	81
2015
2.	(Canada) Eugenie Bouchard	7	Miami Open, United States	Hard	2R	6–0, 7–6^{(7–4)}	113
2018
3.	(Ukraine) Elina Svitolina	5	Wimbledon, United Kingdom	Grass	1R	7–6^{(7–3)}, 4–6, 6–1	57
2019
4.	(United States) Sloane Stephens	6	Miami Open, United States	Hard	3R	6–3, 6–2	62
2022
5.	(Greece) Maria Sakkari	5	Wimbledon, United Kingdom	Grass	3R	6–3, 7–5	103
2025
6.	(United States) Madison Keys	8	Queen's Club, United Kingdom	Grass	SF	6–3, 7–6^{(7–3)}	86

== Billie Jean King Cup performance ==
Group membership	2006	2007	2008	2009	2010	2011	2012	2013	2014	2015	2016	2017	2018	2019	2020-21	2022	2023	2024	2025	W–L
World Group / Finals	A	NP	1R	NP	1R	NP	A	NP	A	A	A	A	SF	1R	A	NP	RR	1R	NP	2–6
WG play-offs / Qualifiers	PO	PO	A	PO	PO	A	A	A	NP		A	A	NP	A	QR	A	QR	QR	QR	7–4
WG II / BJK play-offs	NP	G2	NP	G2	NP	G2	NP	A	NP							A	NP		A	4–0
Singles win–loss	1–0	3–0	0–1	0–1	0–1	0–0	0–0	0–0	0–0	0–0	0–0	0–0	1–1	0–1	1–0	0–0	1–1	1–0	0–2	8–8
Doubles win–loss	0–0	2–0	0–1	1–0	0–1	1–0	0–0	0–0	0–0	0–0	0–0	0–0	1–0	0–0	0–0	0–0	0–0	0–0	0–0	5–2
Overall win–loss	1–0	5–0	0–2	1–1	0–2	1–0	0–0	0–0	0–0	0–0	0–0	0–0	2–1	0–1	1–0	0–0	1–1	1–0	0–2	13–10

Note: Levels of Billie Jean King Cup in which Germany did not participate in a particular year are marked "NP".

== Notes ==
Awards
Preceded by (Spain) Carla Suárez Navarro	WTA Comeback Player of the Year; 2022	Succeeded by (Ukraine) Elina Svitolina
