= History of the Australia Fed Cup team =

The history of the Australia Fed Cup team dates back to the first ever Federation Cup in 1963.

== 1963–1971: Early dominance ==
Australia was one of sixteen nations that competed in the first Fed Cup competition in 1963, at Queen's Club in London. The first team consisted of doubles and singles Grand Slam winner and World No. 1 Margaret Smith, Australian Open singles finalist and doubles winner Jan O'Neill, and multi-Grand Slam winner Lesley Turner. It was also captained by Nell Hall Hopman, who was also a major tennis player and one of the key campaigners for the tournament's introduction. As a result of their eminent team, the Australians were able to defeat the Belgians, Hungarians and South Africans all without losing a rubber to reach the final against the United States. In the final, Smith defeated multi-Grand Slam winner Darlene Hard in straight sets, 6–0, 6–3, to win the first rubber. However, Turner was unable to beat doubles Grand Slam champion Billie Jean Moffitt, and Smith and Turner were defeated in doubles by Moffitt and Hard, meaning the Americans won their first tournament.

However, the Australians were able to enact their revenge by defeating the Americans and winning the next two titles at Philadelphia in 1964 and Melbourne in 1965. However, Smith retired before the 1966 tournament to marry Barry Court and start a family. This meant that the team, without the services of their most prolific player, was unable to reach the final of the next two tournaments: losing to West Germany in 1966 and Great Britain in 1967. However, Court returned to tennis and the Fed Cup team in 1968 where she, with the sole assistance of top 10 player and doubles Grand Slam winner Kerry Melville, was able to win the Cup while only dropping one rubber to South Africa. Their form continued to 1969; with the addition of Wimbledon finalist and multiple doubles Grand Slam winner Judy Tegart, they were able to reach the final against the United States. Though they lost 1–2, Tegart teamed up with doubles Grand Slam champion Karen Krantzcke to win the 1970 tournament, while Court teamed up with Lesley Hunt and then up-and-coming player Evonne Goolagong to win the 1971 Federation Cup on Australian soil without losing a rubber. This meant that Australia had surpassed the United States to hold the record at that time for most Fed Cup titles, with five.

== 1972–1980: Eight consecutive finals ==
The 1971 Federation Cup, which took place in December 1970, transpired to be Court's last. Thus Goolagong, who had by 1972 reached the top 10 and won two Grand Slams in singles and one in doubles, took over to become Australia's most prolific player. While in 1972, when the team consisted of Goolagong, French Open finalist Helen Gourlay, and Hunt, they only managed a semifinal finish, they won the title in 1973 with Goolagong, Patricia Coleman and Janet Young, and in 1974 with Goolagong, Dianne Fromholtz and Young while only losing one tie in total.

In 1975, Australia once again reached the final with the team of Goolagong, Fromholtz and Gourlay. However, they were defeated by Czechoslovakia, 0–3, with Renáta Tomanová and Martina Navratilova overcoming them in only 36 games. Melville returned to the team in 1976 under her married name of Reid and she, alongside Goolagong (who reached the World No. 1 ranking for two weeks) and Fromholtz sent Australia to the final for the fourth consecutive time. They were still unable to claim their eighth title, nevertheless; on this occasion they were defeated by their old rivals from the United States, World No. 5 and successful doubles player Rosemary Casals and Moffitt, then known as Billie Jean King, who had become one of the most efficacious players of all time. After this tournament Goolagong left the Fed Cup team for a while, leaving it in the hands of Fromholtz, Reid and Top 10 player Wendy Turnbull. This team made four more consecutive final appearances for the Australian team, but in every one of them they were defeated by the Americans, mainly due to the presence of Casals and King alongside World No. 1 players Chris Evert and Tracy Austin. In 1979 the Americans surpassed the Australian record of most Fed Cup titles with eight, a record which stands to the present day.

== 1981–1991: Gradual decline ==
In 1981, Australia's streak of consecutive finals was broken when they were defeated in the semifinals by the British team of Sue Barker and Virginia Wade. The Australians once again failed to reach the final in 1982, when they were defeated by West Germany in the semifinals, and in 1983 when they were defeated in the quarterfinals by Switzerland; marking the first time in Fed Cup history when the Australians failed to reach the last four.

In 1984, however, the Australian team once again reached a final with a new team composed of Turnbull, sisters and junior champions Anne and Elizabeth Minter, and mixed doubles champion Elizabeth Sayers. They defeated their rivals from West Germany and United States in the quarterfinals and semifinals respectively, but were once again unable to defeat the Czechoslovak team, this time composed of Helena Suková and Hana Mandlíková, in the final. Nevertheless, this success did not last, as the team was beaten in the semifinals the following year (by United States) and from then on for three consecutive years only be able to make quarterfinal appearances (being defeated by Czechoslovakia in 1986, Bulgaria in 1987 and West Germany in 1988).

In the Year-End rankings of 1987, Australia for the first time had no players within the singles Top 20, and in 1988 had only one player, Anne Minter, within the Top 30. These results transpired into their Fed Cup performance, where despite a semifinal showing in 1989, they had their earliest finishes in 1990 and 1991, when the team was defeated in the second round. On both occasions the highest ranked player in the side was below the Top 35.

== 1992–1994: Momentary return to success ==
Despite the decline, the Australian team had a brief spurt of renewed success in 1992 and 1993, mainly due to Top 50 singles and accomplished doubles player Nicole Provis. In 1992, the team was able to defeat Bulgaria in the first round despite the appearance of Top 20 singles players Katerina Maleeva and Magdalena Maleeva, and Austria in the second round in spite of another Top 20 singles player in Judith Wiesner also being present. This set up a quarterfinal tie against the Czechoslovaks, who were accompanied by Top 20 singles player Helena Suková and Jana Novotná, one of the most consistent singles players and greatest doubles players of all time. While Rachel McQuillan lost to Suková in three sets, Provis was able to cause two upsets by defeating Novotná in singles, and doubles alongside Rennae Stubbs both in straight sets. This led to the Australians proceeding to their first semifinal since 1985. However, they were defeated in the next round by celebrated all-round players Conchita Martínez and Arantxa Sánchez Vicario, as well as future doubles World No. 1 Virginia Ruano Pascual from Spain.

1993 saw an ever greater level of success for Australia, despite a daunting first round draw against the defending champions from Germany. Anke Huber easily defeated Elizabeth Smylie in straight sets to bring a 1–0 lead to the Germans, but after that Provis, then ranked No. 28 in singles, caused a massive upset by defeating World No. 1 and thirteen-time Grand Slam champion Steffi Graf in three sets. Prior to the rubber, Graf had met Provis four times, each time defeating her in straight sets, and had never lost a Fed Cup tie. While Graf had been struggling with an aching shoulder at the time, the match is still remembered as one of the greatest in Australian Fed Cup history, and Provis' career-best win. Following the win, Smylie and Stubbs ended up beating Huber and Barbara Rittner in doubles to ultimately defeat the Germans and create the first ever first-round loss for a defending champion in Fed Cup history.

"It just proves that you don't have to have No. 1 or No. 2 in the world to get to the final. We got this far on our determination."

— Nicole Provis, after the Australians advanced to the 1993 final.

The Australians then accumulated two more easy wins by defeating Denmark in the second round and Finland in the quarterfinals without losing a rubber. This led to a second consecutive semifinal appearance, and a tie against Argentina. The Argentinians and Australians split the singles, with Provis rallying to a three set victory over Florencia Labat, while Smylie and Stubbs won the doubles and lead their team to a 2–1 victory. This caused the Australians to unexpectedly reach their first final since 1984, and set up a tie once against the Spaniards. They were, however, comprehensively defeated once again by Martínez and Sánchez Vicario, respectively ranked No. 6 and No. 3 in singles, 0–3.

The Australians nevertheless failed to repeat their achievements in 1994. Provis left tennis that year to marry basketballer Mark Bradtke, meaning that she was replaced by Top 50 singles player Kristine Radford. Radford did not perform well at the tournament, losing all of her matches. Consequently, Australia only scraped a first round victory over Latvia thanks to wins from McQuillan in singles and Smylie and Stubbs in doubles, and were beaten in the second round by Austria. Australia thus had to contend with their third Round-of-16 defeat in five years.

== 1995–1999: World Group II ==
In 1995, after the format of the Fed Cup was changed to try and mirror the success that the Davis Cup had with theirs, and to provide the nations with more opportunities to play on their home soil, Australia competed in World Group II. Provis rejoined the team with McQuillan and Stubbs as the newly married Nicole Bradtke. They were drawn against Slovakia and scheduled to play in Perth. Despite McQuillan losing both of her singles matches to Karina Habšudová and Radka Zrubáková, Bradtke was able to defeat both in singles and in doubles alongside Stubbs, meaning Australia progressed to the first World Group play-offs.

The Australians were drawn against Argentina in San Miguel for their Play-off to decide which team would enter the World Group. The same team that defeated the Slovaks were sent to Argentina for the tie, but they were defeated, 0–5, by Gabriela Sabatini, Florencia Labat and Inés Gorrochategui. The Australians thus fell back to World Group II for 1996.

1996 saw the Australians lose their World Group II tie to the Netherlands after McQuillan and Stubbs lost all their singles rubbers. They avoided relegation to Zonal Competition, however, by defeating the Canadians, 3–2, in the first ever comeback from 0–2 in Fed Cup history.

1997 saw the retirement of Bradtke after a shoulder injury, which meant that Australia hit a low in women's tennis after regularly lacking more than one team in the Top 100. However, despite never making the World Group, they also avoided regulation to zonal competition in 1997 and 1998. Annabel Ellwood and Kerry-Anne Guse joined the team alongside McQuillan and Kristine Kunce (née Radford), and while they had a victory over South Africa which included an upset of Top 15 player Amanda Coetzer on behalf Top 120 player McQuillan, they could not defeat Spain in the World Group play-offs, despite playing on home soil, and thus did not achieve an opportunity to win the Fed Cup in the World Group. The team suffered more ill fortune in their next tie when Guse and McQuillan could not defeat the Russians in singles at Perth, despite the opponents not having their top players World No. 16 Anna Kournikova and World No. 37 Elena Likhovtseva and thus were relegated to their second World Group II play-offs.

Their tie, drawn against Argentina and held at Canberra, featured a return of McQuillan and Guse but also a debut of Nicole Pratt and junior star Jelena Dokic. The new team performed brilliantly, as Dokic and Pratt won all their singles matches and Guse and McQuillan handily won their doubles match. This allowed Australia to play in World Group II for the fifth consecutive year, the only country to do so.

In 1999, Australia lost their tie against Austria 2–3, despite being up 2–0 at one point. This meant they were relegated once again to the World Group II play-offs. Due to the revamped competition format that would take place in the next year, the team that placed first in the World Group II play-offs would advance to the 2000 World Group while all the others would be assigned Zonal Competition status. Australia won all three of their first matches, and therefore progressed through to the final play-off against the Netherlands. The Australian No. 2, Pratt, narrowly won the first rubber against Miriam Oremans, 6–4, 3–6, 10–8, while the Australian No. 1, Dokic, who defeated World No. 1 Hingis a few weeks earlier, defeated Kristie Boogert in straight sets. This meant that Australia progressed to their first World Group since 1994.

== 2000–2004: World Group failures ==
Australia was placed in Group C for the 2000 World Group, alongside Russia, France and Belgium. They played Belgium in their first tie, and lost 1–2. Despite all the matches being close three-setters and involving many match points savings, Australia's only win came from Dokic, who defeated fellow teenager Kim Clijsters in a two and a half hour match. This rhythm continued for the next two ties, where Australia failed to win a single rubber, but Dokic continued to win her next two singles matches. Australia thus placed last in the pool.

Due to their lack of success in 2000, the Australian team had to go through qualifying in 2001. Dokic, after an incredibly controversial relationship with Australia, decided to quit her citizenship and play instead for her ancestral homeland and birth country of Yugoslavia despite being the country's highest ranked player. This meant that, although efforts were made to keep her, she opted out of playing for future Fed Cup ties with the country, meaning Australian women's tennis was still without any sight of breaking its two-decade drought of any players within the top ten.

The new team was drawn against fellow 2000 World Group participants from Austria to play in Adelaide. The team took a quick 2–0 lead on the first day, and on the second day comprehensively gained the win after World No. 65 Nicole Pratt defeated Sylvia Plischke in straight sets, 20-year-old recognised rising star and World No. 128 Alicia Molik beat Marion Maruska also in straight sets, and McQuillan and Evie Dominikovic finished off the tie to beat Maruska and Patricia Wartusch in doubles to complete a 5–0 clean sweep. The Australians thus progressed to the second round of qualifying, where they were drawn against the Swiss to be played once again on Australian soil, in Sydney. Once again, the Australians were led by Pratt and Molik, while the Swiss were without their top player and thirteen-time Grand Slam champion Martina Hingis. The Australians once again took a quick 2–0 lead, and then went on to win 4–1 with their only loss coming to Molik from World No. 497 Myriam Casanova. The team thus progressed to the World Group, where they were originally placed in a group with second-seeds Belgium, fourth-seeds Spain and Russia. However, due a withdrawal by the defending champions from the United States caused by terrorist threats following the September 11 attacks, the group ended up consisting of Spain, Russia and America's replacement Germany. The team, despite once again being led by Molik and Pratt, was ultimately unsuccessful and failed to win a single rubber.

Australia's performance in 2001 did allow them to compete in the 2002 World Group, where they suffered a very unfortunate draw against the previous year's champions from Belgium; a match anticipated to be a clear Belgian victory due to the fact that their team consisted of singles World No. 3 Kim Clijsters and singles World No. 8 Justine Henin. The tie started as predicted, with Henin and Clijsters leading Belgium to an early 2–0 lead with easy wins over Pratt and Molik. However, Clijsters pulled out of further ties due to a shoulder injury, which led to hope for Australia after Pratt defeated her replacement Els Callens in straight sets. However, Henin soon closed off the tie, 3–1, for Belgium after easily defeating Molik in straight sets.

In the World Group play-offs, Australia was drawn against the Dutch. However, due to Pratt not taking part in the tie due to injury, the top ranked player in the team was World No. 71 Molik, and No. 177 Christina Wheeler had her Fed Cup debut as her replacement. Molik nevertheless ended up almost single-handedly winning the tie for her team, with the Australian media referring to her as "all-conquering" and a "heroine" after she won both her singles matches and the decisive doubles match alongside Rennae Stubbs. The team thus advanced back into the World Group once again.

In 2003, Australia suffered very similar fortunes. The team was once again drawn against a finalist from the previous in the first round of the World Group, in the form of Spain. Molik defeated Virginia Ruano Pascual after Spain's top player Conchita Martínez was forced out with a shoulder injury. but with two subsequent straight sets losses to Pratt from Magüi Serna and a recovered Martínez plus another straight loss from Serna to Molik once again led Australia to a first round defeat and assignment to the World Group play-offs. They narrowly avoided relegation by defeating Colombia, 3–2, after Molik and Stubbs defeated Catalina Castaño and Fabiola Zuluaga in the decisive doubles match.

2004 saw Australia drawn against Russia on Russian soil in the first round. This was considered another daunting task for Australia considering the Russians had six top twenty singles players while Australia had none, and only three top hundred singles players (Molik, Pratt and Samantha Stosur). Fears initially spelled true for the team, as Russia acquired a quick 2–0 lead after No. 5 Anastasia Myskina defeated Stosur in straight sets and No. 14 Svetlana Kuznetsova beat Molik in three. However, Molik managed a surprise upset in the third rubber, defeating Myskina, 6–3, 6–3. Nevertheless, Russia won the next two rubbers to send Australia to their third consecutive World Group Play-off.

They were drawn against Thailand in their Play-off, in a tie described by The Age as "crucial" and "critical". Nevertheless, Molik and Stubbs were not selected by Fed Cup team captain Evonne Goolagong, opting instead for Christina Wheeler and three-time WTA doubles titlist and Fed Cup debutante Lisa McShea, a move which The Sydney Morning Herald stated would "plumet the team to new lows". Molik stated she voluntarily withdrew, despite being Australia's highest ranked singles player, to concentrate on the upcoming Athens Olympics, while Stubbs' omission, in spite of winning a second Wimbledon doubles title the week before the tie, was said to be put down to "a clash of personalities". This situation proved costly for the team, as they lost the first three rubbers of the tie and thus were relegated down to zonal competition for the first time since the competition began, due to losses from Nicole Pratt and Samantha Stosur, and a final loss from Thailand No. 1 Tamarine Tanasugarn to Pratt. This was met with a negative attention in the Australian media, with Michael Cowley from The Sydney Morning Herald calling the team "losers", and The Age reporter Dan Oakes described Australian women's tennis as being "much-maligned". Highly regarded tennis player Todd Woodbridge also publicly criticised Australian tennis in light of this and other disappointing results, saying that Australian tennis "needs to start again" when searching for new talent.

== 2005–2008: Zonal competition ==
Despite the Fed Cup's lack of success, Molik's performance in singles became even more successful, with her, in January, becoming the first Australian since Anne Minter in 1988 to make the Australian Open quarterfinals, and first Australian woman to break the singles top ten in two decades. However, Molik made herself unavailable for the upcoming zonal competition leaving singles ranked 46 Samantha Stosur to lead a squad with Nicole Pratt, Evie Dominikovic, Stosur's doubles partner Bryanne Stewart. Pratt withdrew from the team after a reported pay issue, and as such Sophie Ferguson came in as a nineteen-year-old Fed Cup debutante. The Australian team was drawn in Pool B in the Asia/Oceania zone, with New Zealand, South Korea and Chinese Taipei.

The Australians played the New Zealanders first in their pool, and comprehensively beat them, 3–0, with Dominikovic defeating Leanne Baker, Stosur defeating Marina Erakovic, and Dominikovic and Stewart defeating Baker and Paula Marama despite the 35 °C heat. They then defeating Chinese Taipei, with Ferguson making her debut by handily beating Chao Hsiao-han before Stosur won her singles match and the doubles match alongside Stewart, and her performance receiving praise from the Fed Cup captain John Alexander. Australia then won against South Korea, 2–1, with wins coming from Dominikovic and Stosur in singles over Lee Ye-ra and Kim Jin-hee, to secure a place in the play-offs where the winner would advance to the World Group II play-offs. Despite China boasting Top 50 and Top 70 singles players Li Na and Zheng Jie, as well as Athens Olympics gold medalists Li Ting and Sun Tiantian, Alexander was confident for a win, saying that the team has "an excellent chance in all three matches." Despite this, the Chinese easily defeated the Australians, 2–0, with Sun and Zheng defeating Dominikovic and Stosur in singles. This meant that Australia would play in zonal competition for a second consecutive year.

"I am an Australian, I feel like an Australian and I want to play for Australia again."

— Jelena Dokic, after she re-applied for Australian citizenship in November 2005.

In late 2005, former Yugoslavian World No. 4 Jelena Dokic made a sudden pledge to reapply for Australian citizenship and said that she would make herself available for the Fed Cup team. However, despite receiving a giant wildcard to play in the 2006 Australian Open as an Australian, she was ineligible for participation in the 2006 Fed Cup as she did not meet the ITF's requirements. With Molik having succumbed to an inner ear infection and a ranking that dropped out of the Top 200, this meant that the team for the upcoming Asia/Oceania Zone in South Korea would once again be led by Stosur, ranked No. 57, joined with Pratt, Stubbs and debutante Casey Dellacqua. The team was placed in Pool A alongside the hosts South Korea and Uzbekistan.

Australia easily defeated the Uzbekistanis, with Pratt and Stosur respectively beating Iroda Tulyaganova and Akgul Amanmuradova in straight sets, and then ended up winning their pool by defeating South Korea, 3–0, with Pratt and Stosur once again winning in singles and Stubbs and Stosur teaming up to complete the whitewash in doubles.

Australia then reached the Group I final for the second consecutive year and was drawn against the team that won Pool B, India. Dellacqua lost the first match to Shikha Uberoi in straight sets, but Stosur, despite being ranked seventeen spots lower than Sania Mirza, defeated her and even the tie. Stosur and Stubbs then teamed up again to win the final doubles rubber and secure Australia a spot in the World Group II play-offs.

Australia was drawn against the Swiss for their play-off, with the first ties taking place in Chavannes-de-Bogis, on 15 July. Stosur easily defeated 16-year-old Nicole Riner despite being down 0–40 in the first game, and Pratt backed that up with a surprise win over Swiss No. 1 Timea Bacsinszky. Stosur then completed Australia's win by defeating Bacsinszky, before Alicia Molik played in her first Fed Cup match since 2004 to beat Stefanie Vögele. Molik then teamed up with Stubbs to finish a clean sweep for promotion to World Group II.

Australia was drawn against Austria for their tie, in a tie where Australia yielded doubles No. 1 and singles No. 27 Stosur alongside resurgent top sixty players Pratt and Molik. Captain David Taylor thus stated he "liked the chances" of winning, despite Austria having a home court advantage and boasting recent WTA tour winners in Sybille Bammer and Tamira Paszek. Australia started extremely poorly, with Stosur being crushed in less than an hour by 16-year-old Paszek, and Molik also being defeated by Bammer despite serving for the first set at 5–3. Stosur and Molik then lost their next two singles matches to lose the overall tie and be relegated to the World Group II play-offs.

The team was drawn against Ukraine for their play-off, a tie which they would also host and be seeded for, making it the first time Australia would play a tie at home since 2003, a fact which Taylor believed would boost the chances of the team and Stosur in particular, who would be playing in her home state of Queensland. Pratt, Molik and Stubbs also compiled the team along with 15-year-old Isabella Holland as the hitting partner.

However, Stosur ended up pulling out of the tie, citing a virus that would turn out to be Lyme disease, meaning that near-top-hundred player Casey Dellacqua would join the team, and Pratt would replace Stosur as the highest singles player. Nevertheless, Molik, alongside Italian Mara Santangelo, ended up winning the French Open in doubles, and defeated the Ukrainian Bondarenko sisters Alona and Kateryna on her way to the Wimbledon semifinals. Despite the Bondarenko sisters both being top fifty players and Alona being ranked within the top twenty-five, Molik also had a positive win/loss record against both of them in singles, creating a situation where both teams expected victory and avoidance of the drop to zonal competition.

Molik and Alona Bondarenko opened the tie, with Pratt and Kateryna Bondarenko to follow, and despite the confidence of the Australians they lost their first two rubbers comprehensively; Pratt only able to win one game against Kateryna. The team then ultimately lost the tie, sending them back to the Asia/Oceania Zone for 2008, with Pratt losing to Alona in the third rubber, and Molik and Stubbs falling in doubles despite a lone singles win from Dellacqua.

Despite the recent Fed Cup failures, however, there were many good signs for Australian tennis. Sally Peers and Isabella Holland won the Junior Fed Cup for Australia, defeating Poland in the final, in what was the country's first victory since 1993. In addition, two European tennis players, Jarmila Gajdošová of Slovakia and Anastasia Rodionova of Russia, both successfully applied for Australian citizenship and thereby respectively became the country's fifth (No. 142) and fourth-highest (No. 79) ranked women's tennis players. Nevertheless, the same Fed Cup team used for the tie against Switzerland was picked for the upcoming zonal competition, with Molik, Pratt, Stubbs, and Dellacqua, who was continuing to replace a still-ill Stosur and had been granted a wildcard for the January hardcourt season, being selected.

However, the players chosen for the team failed to play well in early 2008, with both Molik and Pratt falling in the first round of Sydney, and Pratt losing to Nadia Petrova in the first round of the Australian Open. Following these poor results, Pratt announced her immediate retirement from tennis. Dellacqua, on the other hand, defeated former World No. 7 Patty Schnyder and former No. 1 Amélie Mauresmo en route to the fourth round of the Australian Open, a feat which would cause her to surpass Samantha Stosur as the Australian No. 1 and place her in good form.

Junior Jessica Moore replaced Pratt in the team after increasing her ranking by four-hundred places to within the top 300 following a successful Australian Open campaign. They were placed in Pool A alongside India, New Zealand, and Indonesia. They played the New Zealanders in the first tie, with Dellacqua winning the first rubber after Sacha Jones retired due to cramp, Marina Erakovic winning the second after Molik retired suffering from a calf strain, and Dellacqua and Stubbs defeated Leanne Baker and Erakovic in doubles, 7–5, 6–2.

The Australians were then stunned by Indonesia, the lowest-ranked team in the pool, after Moore, replacing the injured Molik, fell to Ayu-Fani Damayanti and Dellacqua was defeated by Sandy Gumulya despite being ranked two hundred places above her. Despite defeating the Indians, 3–0, and Moore gathering a win over Isha Lakhani, the team was unable to qualify for the final. In the end, they finished fourth overall in Group I, marking their lowest ever finish in the competition's history.

== 2009–2012: Return to the World Group ==
A few months after the poor Fed Cup results, Alicia Molik retired from tennis. However, good news soon came to the Australian team when it was announced that Perth would host the Asia/Oceania Zone competition. In addition, Year-End 2008 Australian No. 1 and World No. 52 Samantha Stosur rejoined the WTA Tour after her battle with Lyme Disease, alongside World No. 179 Jelena Dokic, who was competing for a wildcard into the upcoming Australian Open; a wildcard she ended up winning. This led to both women to be included in the new Fed Cup squad, alongside Rennae Stubbs and Casey Dellacqua. In Dokic's case, it was her first tie for Australia since 2000.

The good news for the Australian team continued through the Australian Open, where Stosur was able to reach the third round, and Dokic made a surprise comeback run to the quarterfinals, only losing to third seed Dinara Safina in a very close match. This led to the team having great confidence coming into the Fed Cup competition. They were placed in Pool B alongside Chinese Taipei, South Korea, and Thailand.

The team began well, with Dokic claiming the first win against the Koreans against their No. 2 Lee Jin-a, 6–0, 6–3, before Stosur defeated Lee Ye-ra and Dellacqua and Stubbs won against Chang Kyung-mi and Lee Jin-a in doubles. They then beat the Thai with Dokic easily defeating Suchanun Viratprasert and Stosur coming back from 4–6, 2–5 to defeat the zone's highest-ranked competitor World No. 41 Tamarine Tanasugarn, 4–6, 7–5, 6–0, and eventually sealed their win of the pool after Dellacqua and Stosur had easy singles wins over Taiwanese Hwang I-hsuan and Chan Chin-wei. This allowed Australia to advance to the zone group final against New Zealand, which they won after Dokic and Stosur respectively defeated Dianne Hollands and Marina Erakovic in singles and Dellacqua and Stubbs beat Shona Lee and Kairangi Vano in doubles. Australia thus advanced to the World Group II play-offs, where they were drawn against the Swiss once again.

The tie was chosen to be played at Mildura on grass, with fundraising efforts directed to the recent Black Saturday bushfires. Although the Swiss No. 1 and World Top 20 singles player Patty Schnyder was expected to lead the Swiss team, both she and the Swiss No. 2 (and World No. 88) Timea Bacsinszky, citing respective displeasure with the grass surface and tournament schedule. This led to Australian confidence for the upcoming tie, as Stefanie Vögele (No. 120) and Amra Sadiković (No. 507) were left as the highest-ranked opponents for the Australians, who would be led themselves once again by Stosur and Dokic. While Stosur was positive about her form and stated she was expecting future entry to the singles World Top 10, Dokic admitted that she had been suffering from fatigue in the recent months since the Australian Open.

The Australians nevertheless dominated the first two rubbers, with Stosur and Dokic both winning their singles matches against Sadiković and Vögele in straight sets despite the bad weather. The tie was then secured for Australia after Stosur beat Vögele in the third rubber, despite Jessica Moore falling to 15-year-old Mateja Kraljevic and the final doubles match being abandoned. Australia thus proceeded to World Group II once again.

In July 2009, former Fed Cup player Nicole Pratt was chosen as the national women's tennis coach, after a French Open that was deemed a success for the future of Australian women's tennis. Jarmila Groth (née Gajdošová), former top sixty singles player, also joined the Fed Cup team after finally being made eligible for competition; her acceptance was regarded as a great addition. Casey Dellacqua, who had been suffering from injuries, and Alicia Molik also rejoined the WTA tour for Australia in preparation for the upcoming Australian Open.

However, following a poor Australian Open where she lost in the first round, Dokic declined to appear in the upcoming tie against Spain. This meant that the team was composed of Molik, Dellacqua, Stubbs, and Stosur, who reached the fourth round of the Australian Open and advanced to become the singles World No. 11. Stosur led the team into the first rubber, against Spain's No. 1 and World No. 28 María José Martínez Sánchez. Dellacqua would then play World No. 32 Anabel Medina Garrigues in the second rubber.

Stosur, despite losing the first set and being down three break points in the second, defeated Martínez Sánchez before Dellacqua fell to Medina Garrigues despite being up a break. Stosur then defeated Medina Garrigues in straight sets, before Molik, replacing Dellacqua, lost comprehensively to Carla Suárez Navarro. This meant the tie went to a doubles decider, which was won by the Australians after Stubbs and Stosur defeated Martínez Sánchez and Nuria Llagostera Vives, 6–4, 6–2. This allowed the Australians to progress to the World Group play-offs, the first time they were competing at that level since 2004.

Australia was drawn against Ukraine for tie, which was being held in Kharkiv. Stosur, Molik, Stubbs and Anastasia Rodionova, who became an Australian citizen in December 2009, were picked for the team. Stosur broke into the singles World Top 10 after a successful Indian Wells, and then won her second WTA title and first title on clay, beating Vera Zvonareva in less than an hour at Charleston. Ukraine was led by their top player and World No. 25 Alona Bondarenko, which meant that Stosur was the clear highest player of the tie, and Rodionova was due to play her in the opening rubber.

Rodionova, despite a shaky start, upset Bondarenko, 0–6, 6–3, 7–5, to set Australia to a quick 1–0 lead. Stosur then easily defeated Mariya Koryttseva in straight sets, and the following day also defeated Lyudmyla Kichenok in two sets to secure Australia's World Group spot. Subsequent wins from Molik over Koryttseva and Stubbs and Rodionova in doubles over Kichenok and her twin sister Nadiya caused Australia to progress with a 5–0 clean-sweep. This allowed Australia to compete with the top eight teams for the first time since 2001. This success resulted in positive reactions from the Australian press to the state of Australian women's tennis, much of it being directed at Stosur herself. This appreciation continued after Groth and Stosur became the first Australian women since 1989 to simultaneously reach the fourth round of the French Open. Stosur then went on to become the first Australian woman in thirty years to reach a Grand Slam final, reaching the French Open final after defeating Serena Williams and Jelena Janković. Although she lost to Francesca Schiavone, her campaign was still regarded positively and her ranking increased to No. 6 two weeks later. Stosur then reached the singles Top 5 later in the year, and her success was ranked by The Courier-Mail as one tennis' finest moments of 2010.

Australia faced a tough draw for the 2011 World Group, facing two-time defending champion Italy, held in Hobart. Stosur, Rodionova (No. 64), Molik (No. 130), and Stubbs (doubles No. 10) were returned to a seven-woman Fed Cup squad, alongside Dokic (No. 137), Ferguson (No. 122) and first-timer Groth (No. 42). Stosur ended up being picked as a single for the actual team, alongside Groth, who won a tournament in Hobart just prior to Fed Cup, with Rodionova and Stubbs chosen for doubles. The Italian team comprised Schiavone, Australian Open doubles champion and top twenty singles player Flavia Pennetta, Sara Errani and Roberta Vinci. Groth was set to open the tie against Schiavone, with Stosur playing second against Pennetta and standing by to play doubles if the tie is locked at 2–2.

Groth scored an early upset win over No. 4 Schiavone, 6–7^{(4–7)}, 6–3, 6–3, in match that involved five match points and a thirteen-minute rain delay. However, Stosur lost to Pennetta in a close two and a half hour, 6–7^{(5–7)}, 7–6^{(7–5)}, 6–3, match. Groth then fell to Pennetta in straight sets, bringing Pennetta's Fed Cup winning streak to ten, before Schiavone used four match points to defeat Stosur again and win the tie for Italy. Stubbs and Rodionova then lost to Errani and Vinci in the doubles dead rubber, in what was to be Stubbs' final match before she announced her retirement from professional tennis. This led to captain David Taylor requesting for other top Australians players, such as Dokic, Molik, Dellacqua and young Olivia Rogowska to press for selection.

Stosur began the European claycourt season as defender of over two thousand ranking points, which led to her withdrawing from the upcoming World Group play-offs held in Melbourne against Ukraine. Dokic also withdrew from the tie following her win of the Malaysian Open, meaning that the team included Groth, Rodionova, Ferguson and 19-year-old debutante Sally Peers. Groth was due to open the tie against the Ukrainian team's No. 2 Olga Savchuk, while Rodionova was selected for the second rubber against Lesia Tsurenko. Groth defeated Savchuk, who stated she succumbed to nerves, in less than fifty minutes, but Rodionova was handily upset by Tsurenko in straight sets despite being sixty ranking places ahead of her. Groth then pulled off another easy singles win over Tsurenko, but Rodionova fell to Savchuk, 6–7^{(3–7)}, 6–7^{(12–14)}, despite holding five second set points during the tiebreaker, and Savchuk and Tsurenko closed off the tie for Ukraine in doubles against Groth and Rodionova despite leading at multiple times during all three sets and a game away from winning at one point on Rodionova's serve. This caused Australia to fall back to World Group II once again. Soon after the Fed Cup tie, Groth split from her then-husband Sam Groth and changed her name back to Jarmila Gajdošová, a decision that she stated would not affect her commitment to Fed Cup. Stosur, however, made no guarantees that she make herself available for future Fed Cup ties due to the lack of ranking points gained for doing so.

In the Grand Slams following the Fed Cup losses, Stosur disappointed in her performances by losing in the third round of the French Open and failing to a win a match at Wimbledon. Gajdošová, nevertheless, performed well in Paris, and was the only Australian woman to reach past the second round in London. In September, however, Stosur defied expectations and won her first major title at the US Open during a controversial final against Serena Williams. This led to Stosur gaining worldwide recognition for her performance as the first Australian female Grand Slam winner since 1980 Wimbledon and acknowledgement from Prime Minister Julia Gillard, with some referring to it as a great day for her career and Australian tennis in general. Success continued in Australian tennis as Belinda Woolcock and Wimbledon champion Ashleigh Barty won the Junior Fed Cup over Canada.

For the World Group II tie, Australia was once again was drawn against Switzerland, with the matches to be held in Granges-Paccot on indoor clay. Stosur, Gajdošová, Dokic and Dellacqua were announced for the team, while the Swiss announced No. 124 Vögele and No. 244 Bacsinszky for singles with No. 219 Sadiković made ready to play doubles. Stosur began the tie by defeating Bacsinszky, who was making a comeback from a ten-month injury lay-off, in straight sets, before Gajdošová was overcome by Vögele, 0–6, 7–6^{(10–8)}, 6–8, after eight match points. Australia then took a 2–1 lead in the tie after Stosur defeated Vögele in 66 minutes, and Gajdošová secured the team's win after she beat the inexperienced Sadiković, winning the close final set, 8–6. Dokic and Dellacqua then finished off the tie by winning the doubles rubber over 14-year-old Belinda Bencic and Sadiković in straight sets to gather a 4–1 win to the World Group play-offs. Despite the win, Stosur's coach David Taylor refused to make the top five player commit to the upcoming tie in April to alleviate her stress, a decision that was met with scrutiny by some in the Australian media. Nevertheless, Stosur was nominated for a Fed Cup Heart Award thanks her performance against the Swiss.

The Australians were then drawn against Germany for their play-off tie; considered a challenge for the team due to the fact that there were four Germans in the top forty: Andrea Petkovic (No. 10), Sabine Lisicki (No. 14), Julia Görges (No. 21) and Angelique Kerber (No. 22). Stosur was chosen to lead the tie, with Gajdošová and Dellacqua also playing alongside Rogowska, who was accepted ahead of Dokic as a reward for her sudden rankings improvement. Rodionova expressed disappointment at her omission from the team, nevertheless, as she was the country's highest ranked doubles player and third-highest ranked singles player at the time. The Germans selected an in-form Kerber and Görges to lead their team, with Petkovic also playing despite recovering from a back injury, and Anna-Lena Grönefeld entering as a doubles specialist. Stosur and Kerber, who played each other during Stosur's win at Flushing Meadows, were set to open the tie, with Gajdošová and No. 16 Görges assigned for the second rubber.

In spite of being termed the underdogs of the tie, the Australian team defied expectations and gained an early lead, as Stosur easily defeated Kerber and Gajdošová took an upset straight sets win over Görges. This led to German captain Barbara Rittner choosing Petkovic, who later confessed she was not expecting to play, for Stosur's second single match, but this decision was not successful as Stosur defeated her, 6–4, 6–1, to claim the tie and Australia's place in the 2013 World Group in just 74 minutes. After the victory was asserted, Rogowska was sent in to play Kerber, but she was defeated in straight sets, and Dellacqua and Gajdošová fell to Görges (who was stepping in for Grönefeld after the doubles specialist injured her fifth toe) and Petkovic in doubles.

== 2013–present ==
Australia was drawn against seven-time winners, 2011 and 2012 champions, and No. 1 team Czech Republic for their first-round tie in the 2013 World Group. Before the tie commenced, however, David Taylor stood down as captain to concentrate on coaching Samantha Stosur. He was replaced former World No. 8 and Fed Cup player Alicia Molik, who stated that she and the team remained undaunted despite being the clear underdogs against the Czechs.

Jarmila Gajdošová, after a tumultuous previous number of months, made a return to the tennis in the tournaments preceding the Australian Open. During the Brisbane International, she managed a defeat over No. 16 Roberta Vinci, which was considered a massive high for her career. She then won the mixed doubles tournament at the Australian Open alongside Matthew Ebden, while Casey Dellacqua and Ashleigh Barty made a surprise and successful run to the final of women's doubles, marking the first time an Australian pair made the Australian Open final since December 1977. This victories led to Gajdošová, Dellacqua and Barty being nominated for the tie alongside top ten player Stosur. The Czech team included former Wimbledon champion and World No. 8 Petra Kvitová, No. 18 Lucie Šafářová, and US Open finalists and Olympic silver medalists Andrea Hlaváčková and Lucie Hradecká. Gajdošová was set to open the tie against Kvitová while Stosur would play Šafářová in the second rubber.

Gajdošová fell to Kvitová in two sets, however, and Stosur was defeated by Šafářová, 6–7^{(6–8)}, 6–7^{(4–7)}, despite leading 4–1 in the first set. Stosur was then beaten by Kvitová in three sets, despite holding a match point whilst leading 6–2, 5–4, and Dellacqua and Barty lost to Hlaváčková and Hradecká in doubles (after the Gajdošová–Šafářová match was cancelled due to the ITF's revision of the dead rubber policy) for a 0–4 loss. This forced Australia to play in their fourth World Group Play-off in four years. But despite the loss, Stosur was complimentary of her performance and Molik praised Barty, stating that she had shown "maturity beyond her years". Molik thus expressed confidence that they would be remaining in the Fed Cup's elite eight.

The team drew Switzerland for their play-off, marking the fourth time they would play the Swiss in eight years. Australia were originally selected to host the tie, but Tennis Australia elected to switch the host of the tie to Switzerland so the players can get a chance to play on European clay on the months prior to the French Open. In return for this agreement, Australia would host the Swiss the next two times the teams met in Fed Cup. Australia nominated an unchanged team for the tie, despite Stosur damaging her calf muscle just before the Miami event in March, with Storm Sanders being chosen as "orange girl" after her good results in the ITF Circuit. Although doubt was expressed about Stosur's ability to lead the team in view of her injury, she still declared herself fit to play singles for the event. Gajdošová, despite nearly falling out of the Top 200, was also selected by Molik to play singles, citing an impressive attitude and form whilst on playing on the practice courts. She was due to play second against the Swiss No. 1 and World No. 52 Romina Oprandi, while Stosur would open the tie against World No. 56 Stefanie Vögele in the pair's third Fed Cup meeting in four years.

Frequent rain, however, led to tie being delayed until two days after it was scheduled, and matches being played simultaneously. Stosur defeated Vögele in straight sets while Gajdošová lost to Oprandi, 2–6, 3–6, setting to the time to an early level, before Stosur beat Oprandi and Barty, who was called in to replace Gajdošová, made a surprise win over Vögele despite having lost to her in an ITF tournament the year before and being over a hundred and forty ranking places below her. This led to Australia's first consecutive World Group appearance since 2004 and Molik stating that Barty, who turned seventeen two days after the tie, could be key to future Australian Fed Cup success.

== See also ==
- Australia Fed Cup team
