= 2006 Fed Cup Asia/Oceania Zone Group I – play-offs =

Tennis tournament

The play-offs of the 2006 Fed Cup Asia/Oceania Zone Group I were the final stages of the Group I Zonal Competition involving teams from Asia and Oceania. Using the positions determined in their pools, the nine teams faced off to determine their placing in the 2006 Fed Cup Asia/Oceania Zone Group I, the top country of each pool played for first and second placings, while the bottom two of each pool competed for fifth to eighth. The team that ended up placing first overall advanced to World Group play-offs, whilst those coming in seventh were relegated down to Group II for the next year.

Placing	Pool A	Pool B
1	Australia	India
2		Chinese Taipei
3	South Korea	New Zealand
4	Uzbekistan	Philippines

== Promotion play-offs ==
The first placed teams of each pool were placed against each other in two head-to-head rounds. The winner of the rounds advanced to the World Group II play-offs, where they would get a chance to advance to the World Group II for next year.

=== Australia vs. India ===
Australia
2
Olympic Park, Seoul, South Korea
22 April 2006
Hard (outdoors)

India
1

			1	2	3
1	(Australia) (India)	Casey Dellacqua; Shikha Uberoi	3; 6	2; 6
2	(Australia) (India)	Samantha Stosur; Sania Mirza	6; 4	6; 2
3	(Australia) (India)	Samantha Stosur / Rennae Stubbs; Sania Mirza / Shikha Uberoi	7^{7} 6^{4}	6; 2

== Third ==
As there was only three teams from Pool A as opposed to the four from Pool B, the second-placed team from Pool B (Chinese Taipei) had no equivalent to play against. Thus the Taiwanese were automatically allocated third place.

== Relegation play-offs ==
The last and second-to-last placed teams of each pool were placed against each other in two head-to-head rounds. The losing team of the rounds were relegated to Group II for next year.

=== South Korea vs. Philippines ===
South Korea
2
Olympic Park, Seoul, South Korea
22 April 2006
Hard (outdoors)

Philippines
0

			1	2	3
1	(South Korea) (Philippines)	Chang Kyung-mi; Denise Dy	6; 3	6; 1
2	(South Korea) (Philippines)	Yoo Mi; Czarina-Mae Arévalo	6; 2	6; 2
3	(South Korea) (Philippines)	Kim Mi-ok / Kim So-jung; Czarina-Mae Arévalo / Conchita Corazon Zoleta

=== Uzbekistan vs. New Zealand ===
Uzbekistan
2
Olympic Park, Seoul, South Korea
22 April 2006
Hard (outdoors)

New Zealand
1

			1	2	3
1	(Uzbekistan) (New Zealand)	Iroda Tulyaganova; Leanne Baker	6; 3	7; 5
2	(Uzbekistan) (New Zealand)	Akgul Amanmuradova; Marina Erakovic	5; 7	1; 6
3	(Uzbekistan) (New Zealand)	Akgul Amanmuradova / Iroda Tulyaganova; Leanne Baker / Marina Erakovic	6; 4	7; 5

== Final Placements ==
Placing	Teams
Promoted	Australia
Second	India
Third	Chinese Taipei
Fifth	South Korea
Fifth	Uzbekistan
Relegated	Philippines
Relegated	New Zealand

- Australia advanced to the World Group play-offs, and were drawn against Switzerland, where they won 5–0. The team thus competed in the 2007 World Group II.
- Philippines and New Zealand were relegated down to Asia/Oceania Zone Group II for the next year, but the 2007 Asia/Oceania Zone consisted of simply one group. The New Zealands placed fifth overall, but the Filipinos did not compete.

== See also ==
- Fed Cup structure
