= 2005 Fed Cup Asia/Oceania Zone Group I – Pool A =

Group A of the 2005 Fed Cup Asia/Oceania Zone Group I was one of two pools in the Asia/Oceania Zone Group I of the 2005 Fed Cup. Four teams competed in a round robin competition, with the top team and the bottom two teams proceeding to their respective sections of the play-offs: the top teams played for advancement to the World Group II Play-offs, while the bottom teams faced potential relegation to Group II.

		(China) CHN	(India) IND	(Kazakhstan) KAZ	(Singapore) SIN	RR; W–L	Set; W–L	Game; W–L	Standings
27	China		3–0	3–0	3–0	3–0	18–0	108–22	1
36	India	0–3		3–0	3–0	2–1	12–6	84–57	2
51	Kazakhstan	0–3	0–3		2–1	1–2	5–14	58–94	3
57	Singapore	0–3	0–3	1–2		0–3	2–17	33–110	4

== China vs. Kazakhstan ==
China
3
R.K. Khanna Tennis Complex, New Delhi, India
20 April 2005
Decoturf (outdoors)

Kazakhstan
0

			1	2	3
1	(China) (Kazakhstan)	Zheng Jie; Tatyana Ignatchenko	6; 2	6; 2
2	(China) (Kazakhstan)	Li Na; Mariya Kovaleva	6; 0	6; 1
3	(China) (Kazakhstan)	Li Ting / Sun Tiantian; Mariya Kovaleva / Yekaterina Morozova	6; 1	6; 2

== India vs. Singapore ==
India
3
R.K. Khanna Tennis Complex, New Delhi, India
20 April 2005
Decoturf (outdoors)

Singapore
0

			1	2	3
1	(India) (Singapore)	Ankita Bhambri; Lee Wei-ping	6; 1	7; 5
2	(India) (Singapore)	Shikha Uberoi; Ng Yun-Ling	6; 0	6; 0
3	(India) (Singapore)	Rushmi Chakravarthi / Shikha Uberoi; Ng Yun-Ling / Ong Shao-Fang	6; 1	6; 1

== China vs. Singapore ==
China
3
R.K. Khanna Tennis Complex, New Delhi, India
21 April 2005
Decoturf (outdoors)

Singapore
0

			1	2	3
1	(China) (Singapore)	Zheng Jie; Lee Wei-ping	6; 1	6; 1
2	(China) (Singapore)	Li Na; Ong Shao-Fang	6; 0	6; 0
3	(China) (Singapore)	Li Ting / Sun Tiantian; Lee Wei-ping / Ng Yun-Ling	6; 0	6; 1

== India vs. Kazakhstan ==
India
3
R.K. Khanna Tennis Complex, New Delhi, India
21 April 2005
Decoturf (outdoors)

Kazakhstan
0

			1	2	3
1	(India) (Kazakhstan)	Rushmi Chakravarthi; Yekaterina Morozova	6; 0	6; 1
2	(India) (Kazakhstan)	Shikha Uberoi; Mariya Kovaleva	6; 0	6; 4
3	(India) (Kazakhstan)	Ankita Bhambri / Shikha Uberoi; Mariya Kovaleva / Yekaterina Morozova	6; 4	6; 4

== China vs. India ==
China
3
R.K. Khanna Tennis Complex, New Delhi, India
22 April 2005
Decoturf (outdoors)

India
0

			1	2	3
1	(China) (India)	Zheng Jie; Rushmi Chakravarthi	6; 3	6; 0
2	(China) (India)	Li Na; Shikha Uberoi	6; 1	6; 2
3	(China) (India)	Li Ting / Sun Tiantian; Ankita Bhambri / Rushmi Chakravarthi	6; 2	6; 3

== Kazakhstan vs. Singapore ==
Kazakhstan
2
R.K. Khanna Tennis Complex, New Delhi, India
22 April 2005
Decoturf (outdoors)

Singapore
1

			1	2	3
1	(Kazakhstan) (Singapore)	Tatyana Ignatchenko; Lee Wei-ping	6; 2	3; 6	4; 6
2	(Kazakhstan) (Singapore)	Mariya Kovaleva; Ong Shao-Fang	6; 2	6; 4
3	(Kazakhstan) (Singapore)	Mariya Kovaleva / Yekaterina Morozova; Lee Wei-ping / Ng Yun-Ling	6; 2	6; 0

== See also ==
- Fed Cup structure
