= 2005 Fed Cup Asia/Oceania Zone Group I – play-offs =

International tennis competition play-offs

The play-offs of the 2005 Fed Cup Asia/Oceania Zone Group I were the final stages of the Group I Zonal Competition involving teams from Asia and Oceania. Using the positions determined in their pools, the nine teams faced off to determine their placing in the 2005 Fed Cup Asia/Oceania Zone Group I, the top two countries of each pool played for first to fourth placings, while the bottom two of each pool competed for fifth to eighth. The teams that ended up placing first overall advanced to World Group play-offs, whilst those coming in seventh were relegated down to Group II for the next year.

Placing	Pool A	Pool B
1	China	Australia
2	India	South Korea
3	Kazakhstan	New Zealand
4	Singapore	Chinese Taipei

== Promotion play-offs ==
The first placed teams of each pool were placed against each other in a head-to-head round. The winner of the rounds advanced to the World Group II play-offs, where they would get a chance to advance to the World Group II for next year.

=== China vs. Australia ===
China
2
R.K. Khanna Tennis Complex, New Delhi, India
23 April 2005
Decoturf (outdoors)

Australia
0

			1	2	3
1	(China) (Australia)	Sun Tiantian; Evie Dominikovic	6; 3	7; 5
2	(China) (Australia)	Zheng Jie; Samantha Stosur	6; 3	6; 4
3	(China) (Australia)					not played

== Third to Fourth play-off ==
The second placed teams of each pool were placed against each other in a tie. The winner of the tie was allocated third place in the Group while the loser was allocated fourth.

=== India vs. South Korea ===
India
2
R.K. Khanna Tennis Complex, New Delhi, India
23 April 2005
Decoturf (outdoors)

South Korea
1

			1	2	3
1	(India) (South Korea)	Ankita Bhambri; Lee Ye-ra	1; 6	3; 6
2	(India) (South Korea)	Shikha Uberoi; Kim Jin-hee	6; 3	6; 1
3	(India) (South Korea)	Rushmi Chakravarthi / Shikha Uberoi; Chang Kyung-mi / Lee Jin-a	6; 3	6; 3

== Relegation play-offs ==
The last and second-to-last placed teams of each pool were placed against each other in two head-to-head rounds. The losing team of the rounds were relegated to Group II for next year.

=== Kazakhstan vs. Chinese Taipei ===
Kazakhstan
0
R.K. Khanna Tennis Complex, New Delhi, India
23 April 2005
Decoturf (outdoors)

Chinese Taipei
2

			1	2	3
1	(Kazakhstan) (Chinese Taipei)	Tatyana Ignatchenko; Chao Hsiao-han	4; 6	3; 6
2	(Kazakhstan) (Chinese Taipei)	Mariya Kovaleva; Chen Yi	2; 6	0; 6
3	(Kazakhstan) (Chinese Taipei)					not played

=== Singapore vs. New Zealand ===
Singapore
0
R.K. Khanna Tennis Complex, New Delhi, India
23 April 2005
Decoturf (outdoors)

New Zealand
2

			1	2	3
1	(Singapore) (New Zealand)	Ong Shao-Fang; Paula Marama	1; 6	0; 6
2	(Singapore) (New Zealand)	Ng Yun-Ling; Marina Erakovic	0; 6	0; 6
3	(Singapore) (New Zealand)					not played

== Final Placements ==
Placing	Teams
Promoted	China
Second	Australia
Third	India
Fourth	South Korea
Fifth	Chinese Taipei
Fifth	New Zealand
Relegated	Kazakhstan
Relegated	Singapore

- China advanced to the World Group II play-offs, and were drawn against Slovenia, where they won 4–1. The team thus competed in the 2006 World Group II.
- Kazakhstan and Singapore were relegated down to Asia/Oceania Zone Group II for the next year, where they respectively placed second and third overall. Thus, the Kazakhstanis achieved advancement back to Group I for 2007.

== See also ==
- Fed Cup structure
