= Va'a at the 2009 Pacific Mini Games =

- Location: Rarotonga

Va'a, also called the outrigger canoe, for the 2009 Pacific Mini Games, was held in Rarotonga in the Cook Islands. The sprint races took place at Muri Lagoon and the distance races started and finished at Avarua Wharf.

== Medal table ==
* Host nation (Cook Islands)

Rank	Nation	Gold	Silver	Bronze	Total
1	French Polynesia (TAH)	10	0	0	10
2	New Caledonia (NCL)	0	5	4	9
3	Cook Islands (COK)*	0	4	2	6
4	Fiji (FIJ)	0	1	3	4
5	Niue (NIU)	0	0	1	1
Totals (5 entries)		10	10	10	30

== Medal summary ==
=== Men ===
Event	Gold		Silver		Bronze	
V1 500 m	Manatea Bopp Dupont (TAH)		Christophe Tuluari (NCL)		Mario Mausio (FIJ)	1:57.46
V6 500 m	Tahiti		New Caledonia			
V6 1500 m	Tahiti	7:44	New Caledonia	7:46	Cook Islands	8:17
V1 marathon 15 km	Teva Rete Ebb (TAH)	1:19:	Reuben Dearlove (COK)	1:20:58	Noel Kevin (NCL)	1:22:30
V6 marathon 30 km	Tahiti	2:12:06	New Caledonia	2:16:27	Cook Islands	2:18:53

=== Women ===
Event	Gold		Silver		Bronze	
V1 500 m	Hinatea Bernadino (TAH)		Natalia Evans (FIJ)		Elsa Pauga (NCL)	
V6 500 m	Tahiti	2:20	Cook Islands	2:22		
V6 1500 m	Tahiti	9:13:28	Cook Islands	9:25:66	New Caledonia	
V1 marathon 10 km	Hinatea Bernadino (TAH)	1:01:28	Rosemelle Terii (NCL)	1:03:30	Natalie Evans (FIJ)	
V6 marathon 20 km	Tahiti	1:43:28	Cook Islands	1:45:31	New Caledonia	1:47:28
