= Alexandra Kolesnichenko =

Uzbekistani tennis player (born 1992)

- Full name: Alexandra Kolesnichenko
- Country (sports): Uzbekistan
- Born: 14 December 1992 (age 32); Tashkent, Uzbekistan
- Prize money: $11,068

Singles
- Career record: 23–22
- Career titles: 0
- Highest ranking: No. 577 (21 September 2009)

Doubles
- Career record: 19–17
- Career titles: 1 ITF
- Highest ranking: No. 517 (21 September 2009)

Team competitions
- Fed Cup: 2–0

Alexandra Kolesnichenko (born 14 December 1992) is an Uzbekistani former tennis player.

Over her career, Kolesnichenko won one doubles title on the ITF Women's Circuit. On 21 September 2009, she reached her best singles ranking of world No. 577. On 21 September 2009, she peaked at No. 517 in the doubles rankings.

Playing for Uzbekistan in the Fed Cup, Kolesnichenko has a win–loss record of 2–0. (Note: Alexandra Kolesnichenko at the Billie Jean King Cup (archived))

== ITF Circuit finals ==
Legend
$25,000 tournaments
$10,000 tournaments

=== Singles (0–1) ===
| Result | No. | Date | Tournament | Surface | Opponent | Score |
|---|---|---|---|---|---|---|
| Loss | 1. | 3 August 2009 | New Delhi, India | Hard | (United Kingdom) Emily Webley-Smith | 1–6, 1–6 |

=== Doubles (1–1) ===
| Result | No. | Date | Tournament | Surface | Partner | Opponents | Score |
|---|---|---|---|---|---|---|---|
| Loss | 1. | 15 September 2008 | Qarshi, Uzbekistan | Hard | (Uzbekistan) Albina Khabibulina | (Belarus) Ima Bohush (Ukraine) Lesia Tsurenko | 3–6, 1–6 |
| Win | 1. | 3 August 2009 | New Delhi, India | Hard | (United Kingdom) Emily Webley-Smith | (India) Ashmitha Easwaramurthi (Slovenia) Dalila Jakupović | 6–2, 6–4 |

== Fed Cup participation ==
=== Doubles ===
| Edition | Stage | Date | Location | Against | Surface | Partner | Opponents | W/L | Score |
|---|---|---|---|---|---|---|---|---|---|
| 2009 Fed Cup; Asia/Oceania Zone Group I | R/R | 6 February 2009 | Perth, Australia | India | Hard | (Uzbekistan) Vlada Ekshibarova | (India) Ankita Bhambri (India) Rushmi Chakravarthi | W | 6–2, 7–5 |
| 2009 Fed Cup; Asia/Oceania Zone Group I | P/O | 7 February 2009 | Perth, Australia | South Korea | Hard | (Uzbekistan) Albina Khabibulina | (South Korea) Chang Kyung-mi (South Korea) Lee Jin-a | W | 6–3, 3–6, 6–3 |
