= 2006 Fed Cup Asia/Oceania Zone Group II – Pool =

The Pool of the 2006 Fed Cup Asia/Oceania Zone Group II composed of four teams competing in a round robin competition. The top two teams qualified for Group I next year.

		(Kazakhstan) KAZ	(Singapore) SIN	(Syria) SYR	(Hong Kong) HKG	RR; W–L	Set; W–L	Game; W–L	Standings
49	Kazakhstan		2–1	2–0	0–2	2–1	8–6	59–45	2
65	Singapore	1–2		2–0	0–2	1–2	6–8	46–57	3
69	Syria	0–2	0–2		0–3	0–3	0–14	6–84	4
78	Hong Kong	2–0	2–0	3–0		3–0	14–0	84–9	1

== Kazakhstan vs. Syria ==
Kazakhstan
2
Olympic Park, Seoul, South Korea
20 April 2006
Hard (outdoors)

Syria
0

			1	2	3
1	(Kazakhstan) (Syria)	Tatyana Ignatchenko; Sybille Khayat	6; 1	6; 1
2	(Kazakhstan) (Syria)	Mariya Kovaleva; Sarah Makki	6; 0	6; 0
3	(Kazakhstan) (Syria)	Mariya Kovaleva / Yekaterina Morozova; Line Jouayed / Sybille Khayat				not played

== Kazakhstan vs. Hong Kong ==
Kazakhstan
0
Olympic Park, Seoul, South Korea
20 April 2006
Hard (outdoors)

Hong Kong
2

			1	2	3
1	(Kazakhstan) (Hong Kong)	Yekaterina Morozova; Tong Ka-po	0; 6	0; 6
2	(Kazakhstan) (Hong Kong)	Mariya Kovaleva; Chan Wing-yau	0; 6	4; 6
3	(Kazakhstan) (Hong Kong)	Mariya Kovaleva / Yekaterina Morozova; Chan Wing-yau / Tong Ka-po				not played

== Singapore vs. Syria ==
Singapore
2
Olympic Park, Seoul, South Korea
20 April 2006
Hard (outdoors)

Syria
0

			1	2	3
1	(Singapore) (Syria)	Vanessa Boey; Line Jouayed	6; 0	6; 1
2	(Singapore) (Syria)	Lee Wei-ping; Sybille Khayat	6; 0	6; 1
3	(Singapore) (Syria)	Lee Wei-ping / Ng Yun-Ling; Sybille Khayat / Sarah Makki				not played

== Singapore vs. Hong Kong ==
Singapore
0
Olympic Park, Seoul, South Korea
20 April 2006
Hard (outdoors)

Hong Kong
2

			1	2	3
1	(Singapore) (Hong Kong)	Vanessa Boey; Tong Ka-po	0; 6	0; 6
2	(Singapore) (Hong Kong)	Lee Wei-ping; Chan Wing-yau	3; 6	0; 6
3	(Singapore) (Hong Kong)	Lee Wei-ping / Ng Yun-Ling; Chan Wing-yau / Tong Ka-po				not played

== Kazakhstan vs. Singapore ==
Kazakhstan
2
Olympic Park, Seoul, South Korea
21 April 2006
Hard (outdoors)

Singapore
1

			1	2	3
1	(Kazakhstan) (Singapore)	Tatyana Ignatchenko; Ng Yun-Ling	6; 4	6; 2
2	(Kazakhstan) (Singapore)	Mariya Kovaleva; Lee Wei-ping	4; 6	3; 6
3	(Kazakhstan) (Singapore)	Mariya Kovaleva / Yekaterina Morozova; Lee Wei-ping / Ng Yun-Ling	6; 0	6; 1

== Syria vs. Hong Kong ==
Syria
0
Olympic Park, Seoul, South Korea
21 April 2006
Hard (outdoors)

Hong Kong
3

			1	2	3
1	(Syria) (Hong Kong)	Sybille Khayat; Geraldine Leong	1; 6	0; 6
2	(Syria) (Hong Kong)	Sarah Makki; Tong Ka-po	0; 6	0; 6
3	(Syria) (Hong Kong)	Line Jouayed / Sybille Khayat; Geraldine Leong / Sher Chun-Wing	1; 6	0; 6

- Hong Kong and Kazakhstan advanced to Group I for 2007, but the 2007 Asia/Oceania Zone consisted of simply one group. The Hong Kongers placed sixth overall, while the Kazakhstanis placed eighth.

== See also ==
- Fed Cup structure
