= Scarlett Werner =

German tennis player

- Country (sports): Germany
- Residence: Munich, Germany
- Born: 21 November 1984 (age 41) Munich, West Germany
- Height: 1.72 m (5 ft 8 in)
- Turned pro: 1999
- Plays: Right (two-handed backhand)
- Prize money: $66,387

Singles
- Career record: 131–109
- Career titles: 5 ITF
- Highest ranking: No. 277 (31 October 2011)

Doubles
- Career record: 75–56
- Career titles: 7 ITF
- Highest ranking: No. 199 (10 November 2003)

Scarlett Werner (née Kotschwara; born 21 November 1984) is a German former professional tennis player.

== Career overview ==
Her highest WTA singles ranking is 277, which she reached on 31 October 2011. Her career-high in doubles is world No. 199, achieved on 10 November 2003. She had a career-high junior singles ranking of world No. 10, on 17 January 2000.

== ITF Circuit finals ==
$25,000 tournaments
$10,000 tournaments

=== Singles: 7 (5 titles, 2 runner-ups) ===
Result	No.	Date	Tournament	Surface	Opponent	Score
Loss	1.	9 July 2001	ITF Darmstadt, Germany	Clay	(Spain) Ainhoa Goñi	7–6, 4–6, 1–6
Win	2.	3 May 2010	Wiesbaden Open, Germany	Clay	(Netherlands) Elise Tamaëla	5–7, 6–2, 6–4
Win	3.	23 August 2010	ITF Braunschweig, Germany	Clay	(Russia) Aminat Kushkhova	6–3, 6–0
Win	4.	1 May 2011	ITF Bournemouth, UK	Clay	(Slovakia) Romana Tabak	6–3, 7–5
Win	5.	28 May 2011	ITF Velenje, Slovenia	Clay	(Croatia) Silvia Njirić	6–2, 6–2
Loss	6.	14 August 2011	Reinert Open, Germany	Clay	(Colombia) Mariana Duque	6–7, 5–7
Win	7.	20 August 2011	ITF Ratingen, Germany	Clay	(Ukraine) Elizaveta Ianchuk	6–0, 7–5

=== Doubles: 14 (7 titles, 7 runner-ups) ===
Result	No.	Date	Tournament	Surface	Partner	Opponents	Score
Loss	1.	25 June 2000	ITF Tallinn, Estonia	Clay	(Estonia) Kaia Kanepi	(Poland) Agata Kurowska (Sweden) Maria Wolfbrandt	6–7^{(5–7)}, 4–6
Win	2.	8 October 2000	ITF Fiumicino, Italy	Clay	(Slovakia) Martina Babáková	(Greece) Asimina Kaplani (Greece) Maria Pavlidou	4–1, 4–1, 4–2
Loss	3.	1 December 2002	ITF Mumbai, India	Hard	(New Zealand) Shelley Stephens	(Israel) Tzipora Obziler (Serbia) Katarina Mišić	3–6, 6–4, 5–7
Loss	4.	2 February 2003	ITF Doha, Qatar	Hard	(Germany) Adriana Barna	(Russia) Goulnara Fattakhetdinova (Russia) Galina Fokina	4–6, 3–6
Win	5.	16 August 2009	Reinert Open, Germany	Clay	(Germany) Elisa Peth	(Australia) Alenka Hubacek (New Zealand) Kairangi Vano	w/o
Win	6.	30 August 2009	ITF Braunschweig, Germany	Clay	(Germany) Elisa Peth	(Germany) Sabrina Baumgarten (Germany) Syna Kayser	2–6, 6–3, [10–6]
Win	7.	27 June 2010	ITF Périgueux, France	Clay	(Netherlands) Elise Tamaëla	(Ukraine) Lyudmyla Kichenok (Ukraine) Nadiia Kichenok	6–2, 6–1
Win	8.	1 August 2010	ITF Bad Saulgau, Germany	Clay	(Netherlands) Elise Tamaëla	(Serbia) Ana Jovanović (Germany) Anna Zaja	6–1, 4–6, [10–7]
Win	9.	13 February 2011	ITF Mallorca, Spain	Clay	(Netherlands) Daniëlle Harmsen	(Hungary) Réka Luca Jani (Switzerland) Conny Perrin	6–4, 6–3
Loss	10.	27 March 2011	ITF Gonesse, France	Clay (i)	(Germany) Lena-Marie Hofmann	(Italy) Gioia Barbieri (Italy) Anastasia Grymalska	3–6, 2–6
Loss	11.	1 May 2011	ITF Bournemouth, UK	Clay	(Germany) Alina Wessel	(South Africa) Surina De Beer (United Kingdom) Francesca Stephenson	2–6, 2–6
Loss	12.	7 May 2011	ITF Edinburgh, UK	Clay	(South Africa) Surina De Beer	(United Kingdom) Jade Windley (United Kingdom) Samantha Murray	5–7, 6–4, [8–10]
Win	13.	23 May 2011	ITF Velenje, Slovenia	Clay	(Croatia) Maria Abramović	(Germany) Dejana Raickovic (Bulgaria) Dalia Zafirova	6–4, 6–4
Loss	14.	11 July 2011	ITF Imola, Italy	Carpet	(Colombia) Yuliana Lizarazo	(Italy) Giulia Gatto-Monticone (Italy) Federica Quercia	w/o
