= 2005 Fed Cup Asia/Oceania Zone Group I – Pool B =

Group B of the 2005 Fed Cup Asia/Oceania Zone Group I was one of two pools in the Asia/Oceania Zone Group I of the 2005 Fed Cup. Four teams competed in a round robin competition, with the top team and the bottom two teams proceeding to their respective sections of the play-offs: the top teams played for advancement to the World Group II Play-offs, while the bottom teams faced potential relegation to Group II.

		(Australia) AUS	(Chinese Taipei) TPE	(South Korea) KOR	(New Zealand) NZL	RR; W–L	Set; W–L	Game; W–L	Standings
19	Australia		3–0	2–1	3–0	3–0	16–4	118–65	1
32	Chinese Taipei	0–3		0–3	0–3	0–3	0–18	33–108	4
34	South Korea	1–2	3–0		2–1	2–1	13–8	102–90	2
41	New Zealand	0–3	3–0	1–2		1–2	11–9	101–91	3

== Australia vs. New Zealand ==
Australia
3
R.K. Khanna Tennis Complex, New Delhi, India
20 April 2005
Decoturf (outdoors)

New Zealand
0

			1	2	3
1	(Australia) (New Zealand)	Evie Dominikovic; Leanne Baker	6; 2	6; 3
2	(Australia) (New Zealand)	Samantha Stosur; Marina Erakovic	6; 4	6; 4
3	(Australia) (New Zealand)	Evie Dominikovic / Bryanne Stewart; Leanne Baker / Paula Marama	6^{7} 7^{9}	6; 1	6; 4

== Chinese Taipei vs. South Korea ==
Chinese Taipei
0
R.K. Khanna Tennis Complex, New Delhi, India
22 April 2005
Decoturf (outdoors)

South Korea
3

			1	2	3
1	(Chinese Taipei) (South Korea)	Wang Ting-wen; Lee Ye-ra	2; 6	0; 6
2	(Chinese Taipei) (South Korea)	Chen Yi; Kim Jin-hee	2; 6	3; 6
3	(Chinese Taipei) (South Korea)	Lu Yen-hua / Chao Hsiao-han; Chang Kyung-mi / Lee Jin-a	0; 6	4; 6

== Australia vs. Chinese Taipei ==
Australia
3
R.K. Khanna Tennis Complex, New Delhi, India
21 April 2005
Decoturf (outdoors)

Chinese Taipei
0

			1	2	3
1	(Australia) (Chinese Taipei)	Sophie Ferguson; Chao Hsiao-han	6; 1	6; 2
2	(Australia) (Chinese Taipei)	Samantha Stosur; Chen Yi	6; 0	6; 2
3	(Australia) (Chinese Taipei)	Bryanne Stewart / Samantha Stosur; Lu Yen-hua / Wang Ting-wen	6; 1	6; 3

== South Korea vs. New Zealand ==
South Korea
2
R.K. Khanna Tennis Complex, New Delhi, India
21 April 2005
Decoturf (outdoors)

New Zealand
1

			1	2	3
1	(South Korea) (New Zealand)	Lee Ye-ra; Leanne Baker	6; 4	3; 6	6; 4
2	(South Korea) (New Zealand)	Kim Jin-hee; Marina Erakovic	1; 6	4; 6
3	(South Korea) (New Zealand)	Chang Kyung-mi / Kim Jin-hee; Eden Marama / Paula Marama	2; 6	6; 3	7; 5

== Australia vs. South Korea ==
Australia
2
R.K. Khanna Tennis Complex, New Delhi, India
22 April 2005
Decoturf (outdoors)

South Korea
1

			1	2	3
1	(Australia) (South Korea)	Evie Dominikovic; Lee Ye-ra	6; 0	4; 6	6; 3
2	(Australia) (South Korea)	Samantha Stosur; Kim Jin-hee	6; 3	7; 5
3	(Australia) (South Korea)	Sophie Ferguson / Bryanne Stewart; Chang Kyung-mi / Lee Jin-a	5; 7	6^{4} 7^{7}

== Chinese Taipei vs. New Zealand ==
Chinese Taipei
0
R.K. Khanna Tennis Complex, New Delhi, India
22 April 2005
Decoturf (outdoors)

New Zealand
3

			1	2	3
1	(Chinese Taipei) (New Zealand)	Lu Yen-hua; Paula Marama	3; 6	2; 6
2	(Chinese Taipei) (New Zealand)	Chen Yi; Marina Erakovic	2; 6	3; 6
3	(Chinese Taipei) (New Zealand)	Chao Hsiao-han / Wang Ting-wen; Leanne Baker / Eden Marama	0; 6	4; 6

== See also ==
- Fed Cup structure
