= Alenka Hubacek =

Australian tennis player

- Country (sports): Australia
- Born: 24 November 1990 (age 34)
- Plays: Right-handed (two-handed backhand)
- Prize money: US$ 39,702

Singles
- Career record: 81–104
- Career titles: 0
- Highest ranking: No. 460 (8 February 2010)

Grand Slam singles results
- Australian Open: Q1 (2007)

Doubles
- Career record: 70–74
- Career titles: 4 ITF
- Highest ranking: No. 274 (27 September 2010)

Grand Slam doubles results
- Australian Open: 1R (2008)

Alenka Hubacek (born 24 November 1990) is an Australian former professional tennis player.

Hubacek has a career-high WTA rankings of 460 in singles, achieved on 8 February 2010, and 274 in doubles, set on 27 September 2010. On the ITF Circuit, she won four doubles titles in her career.

Hubacek made her Grand Slam main-draw debut at the 2008 Australian Open, in the doubles tournament partnering Tyra Calderwood.

== ITF finals ==
=== Doubles: 12 (4–8) ===
$100,000 tournaments
$75,000 tournaments
$50,000 tournaments
$25,000 tournaments
$10,000 tournaments

Outcome	No.	Date	Tournament	Surface	Partner	Opponents	Score
Winner	1.	1 May 2007	ITF Bournemouth, England	Clay	(Australia) Jessica Moore	(Austria) Melanie Klaffner (Switzerland) Nicole Riner	5–7, 6–4, 6–4
Runner-up	2.	22 June 2009	ITF Rotterdam, Netherlands	Clay	(New Zealand) Kairangi Vano	(Latvia) Irina Kuzmina (Russia) Eugeniya Pashkova	6–7^{(6–8)}, 6–7^{(8–10)}
Runner-up	3.	29 June 2009	ITF Cremona, Italy	Clay	(Australia) Tammi Patterson	(Italy) Benedetta Davato (Switzerland) Lisa Sabino	5–7, 3–6
Runner-up	4.	16 August 2009	ITF Versmold, Germany	Clay	(New Zealand) Kairangi Vano	(Germany) Elisa Peth (Germany) Scarlett Werner	w/o
Runner-up	5.	21 September 2009	ITF Darwin, Australia	Hard	(Indonesia) Jessy Rompies	(Australia) Isabella Holland (Australia) Sally Peers	4–6, 6–3, [4–10]
Runner-up	6.	16 October 2009	ITF Port Pirie, Australia	Hard	(Australia) Bojana Bobusic	(Japan) Erika Sema (Japan) Yurika Sema	1–6, 7–5, [6–10]
Runner-up	7.	28 March 2010	ITF Antalya, Turkey	Clay	(Romania) Mihaela Buzărnescu	(Ukraine) Yuliya Beygelzimer (Greece) Anna Gerasimou	w/o
Winner	8.	24 May 2010	ITF Velenje, Slovenia	Clay	(Australia) Tammi Patterson	(Czech Republic) Kateřina Kramperová (Czech Republic) Pavla Šmídová	6–1, 3–6, 6–4
Runner-up	9.	14 September 2010	ITF Darwin, Australia	Hard	(Australia) Tammi Patterson	(Japan) Kumiko Iijima (Japan) Yurika Sema	4–6, 1–6
Winner	10.	5 October 2010	ITF Port Pirie, Australia	Hard	(Australia) Bojana Bobusic	(United Kingdom) Melanie South (Japan) Remi Tezuka	6–3, 6–3
Winner	11.	25 June 2011	ITF Alcobaça, Portugal	Hard	(Denmark) Malou Ejdesgaard	(Ecuador) Mariana Correa (United States) Danielle Mills	6–2, 7–5
Runner-up	12.	1 July 2011	ITF Melilla, Spain	Hard (i)	(Denmark) Malou Ejdesgaard	(Kazakhstan) Aselya Arginbayeva (Russia) Tanya Samodelok	6–1, 3–6, [7–10]
