= Kairangi Vano =

Cook Islands tennis player (born 1989)

- Country (sports): New Zealand; Cook Islands
- Born: 8 November 1989 (age 36)
- Turned pro: 2005
- Plays: Right-handed (two-handed backhand)
- Prize money: US$8,085

Singles
- Career record: 24 - 31
- Career titles: 0
- Highest ranking: No. 678 (6 October 2008)

Doubles
- Career record: 11 - 11
- Career titles: 0 WTA, 1 ITF
- Highest ranking: No. 712 (21 June 2010)

Team competitions
- Fed Cup: 3–2
- Last updated on: 8 April 2017.

Medal record

Women's Tennis

Representing Cook Islands

Pacific Mini Games
Gold medal – first place	2009 Rarotonga	Singles
Gold medal – first place	2009 Rarotonga	Doubles
Silver medal – second place	2009 Rarotonga	Team

Kairangi Vano (born 8 November 1989) is a New Zealand-born Cook Islands professional tennis player.

Her career-high WTA singles ranking was 678, which she reached on 6 October 2008, high WTA doubles ranking was 712, which she reached on 21 June 2010. She has won one ITF Doubles titles.

Playing for New Zealand Fed Cup team at the Fed Cup, Vano has a win–loss record of 3–2.

Vano made her WTA main draw debut at the 2009 ASB Classic, in the doubles main draw partnering Shona Lee. They lost their only match to Edina Gallovits-Hall and Eva Hrdinová; and earned $860 in prize money.

She won the Women's singles and partnering Brittany Teei Women's doubles Gold medal at the 2009 Pacific Mini Games in Rarotonga for Cook Islands.

She lost Women's Team final New Caledonia won Silver medal at the 2009 Pacific Mini Games in Rarotonga for Cook Islands.

== Fed Cup participation ==
=== Singles ===
Edition	Stage	Date	Location	Against	Surface	Opponent	W/L	Score
2006 Fed Cup; Asia/Oceania Zone Group I	R/R	21 April 2006	Seoul, South Korea	India	Hard	(India) Shikha Uberoi	L	1–6, 3–6

=== Doubles ===
Edition	Stage	Date	Location	Against	Surface	Partner	Opponents	W/L	Score
2009 Fed Cup; Asia/Oceania Zone Group I	R/R	4 February 2009	Perth, Australia	India	Hard	(New Zealand) Marina Erakovic	Ankita Bhambri; Sanaa Bhambri	W	6–2, 6–3
2009 Fed Cup; Asia/Oceania Zone Group I	R/R	5 February 2009	Perth, Australia	Uzbekistan	Hard	(New Zealand) Marina Erakovic	Akgul Amanmuradova; Albina Khabibulina	W	7–6^{(8–6)}, 4–6, 6–2
2009 Fed Cup; Asia/Oceania Zone Group I	R/R	6 February 2009	Perth, Australia	Indonesia	Hard	(New Zealand) Marina Erakovic	Ayu-Fani Damayanti; Sandy Gumulya	W	6–3, 2–6, 6–3
2009 Fed Cup; Asia/Oceania Zone Group I	P/O	7 February 2009	Perth, Australia	Australia	Hard	(New Zealand) Shona Lee	Casey Dellacqua; Rennae Stubbs	L	2–6, 2–6

== Other finals ==
=== Singles ===
Outcome	Date	Tournament	Location	Opponent	Score
Gold Medal	October 2009	2009 Pacific Mini Games	Rarotonga, Cook Islands	(New Caledonia) Élodie Rogge	6–2, 1–6, 7–5

=== Doubles ===
Outcome	Date	Tournament	Location	Partnered	Opponents	Score
Gold Medal	October 2009	2009 Pacific Mini Games	Rarotonga, Cook Islands	(Cook Islands) Brittany Teei	(New Caledonia) Élodie Rogge (New Caledonia) Meryl Pydo	6–4, 6–3

=== Women's team ===
Outcome	Date	Tournament	Location	Partners	Opponents	Score
Silver Medal	October 2009	2009 Pacific Mini Games	Rarotonga, Cook Islands	(Cook Islands) Brittany Teei (Cook Islands) Norah Browne (Cook Islands) Davina Hosking	(New Caledonia) Stéphanie Di Luccio (New Caledonia) Alize Dietrich (New Caledonia) Meryl Pydo (New Caledonia) Élodie Rogge	0–2

== ITF finals (1–3) ==
=== Singles (0–1) ===
Legend $100,000 tournaments $75,000 tournaments $50,000 tournaments $25,000 tournaments $15,000 tournaments $10,000 tournaments	Finals by surface Hard (0–1) Clay (0–0) Grass (0–0) Carpet (0–0)

Result	Date	Tournament	Surface	Opponent	Score
Runner-up	27 February 2007	Wellington, New Zealand	Hard	(Hong Kong) Zhang Ling	1–6, 1–6

=== Doubles (1–2) ===
Legend $100,000 tournaments $75,000 tournaments $50,000 tournaments $25,000 tournaments $15,000 tournaments $10,000 tournaments	Finals by surface Hard (1–0) Clay (0–2) Grass (0–0) Carpet (0–0)

Result	Date	Tournament	Surface	Partner	Opponents	Score
Winner	12 February 2006	Wellington, New Zealand	Hard	(New Zealand) Paula Marama	(New Zealand) Leanne Baker (New Zealand) Ellen Barry	6–3, 6–1
Runner-up	22 June 2009	Rotterdam, Netherlands	Clay	(Australia) Alenka Hubacek	(Latvia) Irina Kuzmina (Russia) Eugeniya Pashkova	6–7^{(6–8)}, 6–7^{(8–10)}
Runner-up	16 August 2009	Versmold, Germany	Clay	(Australia) Alenka Hubacek	(Germany) Elisa Peth (Germany) Scarlett Werner	W/O
