= Tennis at the 2009 Pacific Mini Games =

Tennis at the 2009 Pacific Mini Games in Rarotonga was held on September 22, October 1, 2009.

== Medal summary ==
=== Medal table ===
Rank	Nation	Gold	Silver	Bronze	Total
1	New Caledonia (NCL)	5	2	0	7
2	Cook Islands (COK)	2	1	1	4
3	French Polynesia (TAH)	0	2	0	2
4	Samoa (SAM)	0	1	6	7
5	Vanuatu (VAN)	0	1	0	1
Totals (5 entries)		7	7	7	21

=== Medals events ===
Event	Gold	Silver	Bronze
Men's Singles	(New Caledonia) New Caledonia; Nickolas N’Godrela	(French Polynesia) Tahiti; Gilles De Gouy	(Samoa) Samoa; Leon So'Onalole
Women's Singles	(Cook Islands) Cook Islands; Kairangi Vano	(New Caledonia) New Caledonia; Élodie Rogge	(Cook Islands) Cook Islands; Brittany Teei
Men's Doubles	(New Caledonia) New Caledonia; Guillaume Monot; Nickolas N’Godrela	(French Polynesia) Tahiti; Patrice Cotti; Raiarii Yan	(Samoa) Samoa; Leon So'Onalole; Marvin So'Onalole
Women's Doubles	(Cook Islands) Cook Islands; Brittany Teei; Kairangi Vano	(New Caledonia) New Caledonia; Élodie Rogge; Meryl Pydo	(Samoa) Samoa; Maylani Ah Hoy; Tagifano So'Onalole
Mixed Doubles	(New Caledonia) New Caledonia; Nickolas N’Godrela; Élodie Rogge	(Samoa) Samoa; Marvin So'Onalole; Tagifano So'Onalole	(Samoa) Samoa; Leon So'Onalole; Maylani Ah Hoy
Men's Team	(New Caledonia) New Caledonia; Guillaume Monot; Mathieu Monot; Nickolas N’Godrela; Boris Vermet	(Vanuatu) Vanuatu; Andrew Mailtorok; Cyril Jacobe; Cyrille Mainguy; Jerome Rovo	(Samoa) Samoa; Leon So'Onalole; Marvin So'Onalole; Reinsford Penn
Women's Team	(New Caledonia) New Caledonia; Stéphanie Di Luccio; Alize Dietrich; Meryl Pydo; Élodie Rogge	(Cook Islands) Cook Islands; Brittany Teei; Kairangi Vano; Norah Browne; Davina Hosking	(Samoa) Samoa; Maylani Ah Hoy; Steffi Carruthers; Tagifano So'Onalole
