= 2005 Fed Cup World Group II =

Part of tennis tournament

The World Group II was the second highest level of Fed Cup competition in 2005. Winning nations advanced to the World Group play-offs, and the losing nations were demoted to the World Group II play-offs.

== Switzerland vs. Slovakia ==
Switzerland
3
Patinoires due Littoral, Neuchâtel, Switzerland
23–24 April 2005
Rebound Ace Synpave (indoors)

Slovakia
2

			1	2	3
1	(Switzerland) (Slovakia)	Timea Bacsinszky; Martina Suchá	6; 4	6; 3
2	(Switzerland) (Slovakia)	Myriam Casanova; Ľubomíra Kurhajcová	0; 6	0; 6
3	(Switzerland) (Slovakia)	Myriam Casanova; Martina Suchá	0; 6	6^{5} 7^{7}
4	(Switzerland) (Slovakia)	Timea Bacsinszky; Ľubomíra Kurhajcová	3; 6	6; 4	6; 3
5	(Switzerland) (Slovakia)	Timea Bacsinszky / Myriam Casanova; Eva Fislová / Stanislava Hrozenská	6; 3	6; 2

== Germany vs. Indonesia ==
Germany
4
Etuf Essen, Essen, Germany
23–24 April 2005
Red clay (outdoors)

Indonesia
1

			1	2	3
1	(Germany) (Indonesia)	Anna-Lena Grönefeld; Ayu-Fani Damayanti	6; 3	6; 1
2	(Germany) (Indonesia)	Julia Schruff; Wynne Prakusya	6; 1	6; 0
3	(Germany) (Indonesia)	Anna-Lena Grönefeld; Wynne Prakusya	6; 0	6; 2
4	(Germany) (Indonesia)	Anca Barna; Romana Tedjakusuma	6; 4	6; 3
5	(Germany) (Indonesia)	Sandra Klösel / Julia Schruff; Wynne Prakusya / Romana Tedjakusuma	6^{5} 7^{7}	4; 6

== Thailand vs. Croatia ==
Thailand
2
Patong Beach, Phuket, Thailand
23–24 April 2005
Rebound Synpave (outdoors)

Croatia
3

			1	2	3
1	(Thailand) (Croatia)	Tamarine Tanasugarn; Sanda Mamić	7; 5	6; 1
2	(Thailand) (Croatia)	Suchanun Viratprasert; Jelena Kostanić	5; 7	6; 4	3; 6
3	(Thailand) (Croatia)	Tamarine Tanasugarn; Jelena Kostanić	3; 6	2; 6
4	(Thailand) (Croatia)	Suchanun Viratprasert; Sanda Mamić	6; 3	7^{7} 6^{1}
5	(Thailand) (Croatia)	Tamarine Tanasugarn / Napaporn Tongsalee; Jelena Kostanić / Matea Mezak	4; 6	2; 6

== Czech Republic vs. Japan ==
Czech Republic
3
ČEZ Coloseum, Prague, Czech Republic
23–24 April 2005
Red clay (outdoors)

Japan
2

			1	2	3
1	(Czech Republic) (Japan)	Iveta Benešová; Akiko Morigami	3; 6	6^{7} 7^{9}
2	(Czech Republic) (Japan)	Nicole Vaidišová; Aiko Nakamura	6; 3	6; 1
3	(Czech Republic) (Japan)	Nicole Vaidišová; Akiko Morigami	3; 6	2; 6
4	(Czech Republic) (Japan)	Květa Peschke; Rika Fujiwara	6; 0	6; 3
5	(Czech Republic) (Japan)	Iveta Benešová / Květa Peschke; Akiko Morigami / Saori Obata	4; 6	6; 3	6; 0

== See also ==
- Fed Cup structure
