= 2006 Fed Cup Asia/Oceania Zone Group I – Pool A =

Group A of the 2006 Fed Cup Asia/Oceania Zone Group I was one of two pools in the Asia/Oceania Zone Group I of the 2006 Fed Cup. Three teams competed in a round robin competition, with the top team and the bottom two teams proceeding to their respective sections of the play-offs: the top teams played for advancement to the World Group II Play-offs, while the bottom teams faced potential relegation to Group II.

		(Australia) AUS	(South Korea) KOR	(Uzbekistan) UZB	RR; W–L	Set; W–L	Game; W–L	Standings
26	Australia		3–0	2–0	2–0	10–1	64–41	1
33	South Korea	0–3		2–0	1–1	5–6	52–52	2
48	Uzbekistan	0–2	0–2		0–2	0–8	26–49	3

== Australia vs. Uzbekistan ==
Australia
2
Olympic Park, Seoul, South Korea
20 April 2006
Hard (outdoors)

Uzbekistan
0

			1	2	3
1	(Australia) (Uzbekistan)	Nicole Pratt; Iroda Tulyaganova	6; 4	6; 4
2	(Australia) (Uzbekistan)	Samantha Stosur; Akgul Amanmuradova	6; 4	6; 2
3	(Australia) (Uzbekistan)	Samantha Stosur / Rennae Stubbs; Akgul Amanmuradova / Iroda Tulyaganova				not played

== South Korea vs. Uzbekistan ==
South Korea
2
Olympic Park, Seoul, South Korea
20 April 2006
Hard (outdoors)

Uzbekistan
0

			1	2	3
1	(South Korea) (Uzbekistan)	Chang Kyung-mi; Iroda Tulyaganova	6; 0	6; 3
2	(South Korea) (Uzbekistan)	Yoo Mi; Akgul Amanmuradova	7^{9} 6^{7}	6; 3
3	(South Korea) (Uzbekistan)	Kim Mi-ok / Kim So-jung; Akgul Amanmuradova / Iroda Tulyaganova				not played

== Australia vs. South Korea ==
Australia
3
Olympic Park, Seoul, South Korea
21 April 2006
Hard (outdoors)

South Korea
0

			1	2	3
1	(Australia) (South Korea)	Nicole Pratt; Chang Kyung-mi	3; 6	6; 3	6; 4
2	(Australia) (South Korea)	Samantha Stosur; Yoo Mi	6; 4	6; 2
3	(Australia) (South Korea)	Samantha Stosur / Rennae Stubbs; Kim Mi-ok / Kim So-jung	7^{7} 6^{4}	6; 2

== See also ==
- Fed Cup structure
