= 2009 Fed Cup Asia/Oceania Zone Group I – Pool B =

Group B of the 2009 Fed Cup Asia/Oceania Zone Group I was one of two pools in the Asia/Oceania Zone Group I of the 2009 Fed Cup. Four teams competed in a round robin competition, with the top team and the bottom two teams proceeding to their respective sections of the play-offs: the top teams played for advancement to the World Group II Play-offs, while the bottom teams faced potential relegation to Group II.

		(Chinese Taipei) TPE	(Australia) AUS	(South Korea) KOR	(Thailand) THA	RR; W–L	Set; W–L	Game; W–L	Standings
18	Chinese Taipei		0–3	1–2	0–3	0–3	4–16	67–111	4
20	Australia	3–0		3–0	3–0	3–0	18–1	114–45	1
33	South Korea	2–1	0–3		0–3	1–2	4–15	57–108	3
35	Thailand	3–0	0–3	3–0		2–1	13–7	100–74	2

== Chinese Taipei vs. Thailand ==
Chinese Taipei
0
State Tennis Centre, Perth, Australia
4 February 2009
Plexicushion (outdoors)

Thailand
3

			1	2	3
1	(Chinese Taipei) (Thailand)	Hwang I-hsuan; Suchanun Viratprasert	6^{3} 7^{7}	1; 6
2	(Chinese Taipei) (Thailand)	Chan Chin-wei; Tamarine Tanasugarn	2; 6	0; 6
3	(Chinese Taipei) (Thailand)	Chuang Chia-jung / Hwang I-hsuan; Noppawan Lertcheewakarn / Tamarine Tanasugarn	1; 6	7^{7} 6^{5}	1; 6

== Australia vs. South Korea ==
Australia
3
State Tennis Centre, Perth, Australia
4 February 2009
Plexicushion (outdoors)

South Korea
0

			1	2	3
1	(Australia) (South Korea)	Jelena Dokić; Lee Jin-a	6; 0	6; 3
2	(Australia) (South Korea)	Samantha Stosur; Lee Ye-ra	6; 2	6; 4
3	(Australia) (South Korea)	Casey Dellacqua / Rennae Stubbs; Chang Kyung-mi / Lee Jin-a	6; 0	6; 2

== Chinese Taipei vs. South Korea ==
Chinese Taipei
1
State Tennis Centre, Perth, Australia
5 February 2009
Plexicushion (outdoors)

South Korea
2

			1	2	3
1	(Chinese Taipei) (South Korea)	Hwang I-hsuan; Lee Jin-a	3; 6	6; 4	5; 7
2	(Chinese Taipei) (South Korea)	Chan Chin-wei; Lee Ye-ra	5; 7	4; 6
3	(Chinese Taipei) (South Korea)	Chan Chin-wei / Chuang Chia-jung; Chang Kyung-mi / Yu Min-hwa	6; 0	6; 1

== Australia vs. Thailand ==
Australia
3
State Tennis Centre, Perth, Australia
5 February 2009
Plexicushion (outdoors)

Thailand
0

			1	2	3
1	(Australia) (Thailand)	Jelena Dokić; Suchanun Viratprasert	6; 1	6; 2
2	(Australia) (Thailand)	Samantha Stosur; Tamarine Tanasugarn	4; 6	7; 5	6; 0
3	(Australia) (Thailand)	Casey Dellacqua / Rennae Stubbs; Noppawan Lertcheewakarn / Varatchaya Wongteanchai	6; 4	6; 2

== Chinese Taipei vs. Australia ==
Chinese Taipei
0
State Tennis Centre, Perth, Australia
6 February 2009
Plexicushion (outdoors)

Australia
3

			1	2	3
1	(Chinese Taipei) (Australia)	Hwang I-hsuan; Casey Dellacqua	1; 6	1; 6
2	(Chinese Taipei) (Australia)	Chan Chin-wei; Samantha Stosur	3; 6	0; 6
3	(Chinese Taipei) (Australia)	Chan Chin-wei / Chuang Chia-jung; Samantha Stosur / Rennae Stubbs	3; 6	6^{2} 7^{7}

== South Korea vs. Thailand ==
South Korea
3
State Tennis Centre, Perth, Australia
6 February 2009
Plexicushion (outdoors)

Thailand
0

			1	2	3
1	(South Korea) (Thailand)	Lee Jin-a; Suchanun Viratprasert	6^{5} 7^{7}	1; 6
2	(South Korea) (Thailand)	Lee Ye-ra; Tamarine Tanasugarn	0; 6	4; 6
3	(South Korea) (Thailand)	Chang Kyung-mi / Yu Min-hwa; Noppawan Lertcheewakarn / Varatchaya Wongteanchai	2; 6	2; 6

== See also ==
- Fed Cup structure
