= 2009 Fed Cup Asia/Oceania Zone Group I – play-offs =

International tennis competition play-offs

The play-offs of the 2009 Fed Cup Asia/Oceania Zone Group I were the final stages of the Group I zonal competition involving teams from Asia and Oceania. Using the positions determined in their pools, the eight teams faced off to determine their placing in the 2009 Fed Cup Asia/Oceania Zone Group I. The top team advanced to the World Group II, and the bottom team were relegated down to the Group II for the next year.

Placing	Pool A	Pool B
1	New Zealand	Australia
2	Indonesia	Thailand
3	Uzbekistan	South Korea
4	India	Chinese Taipei

== Promotional play-offs ==
The first placed teams of each pool were placed against each other in a head-to-head round. The winner of the rounds advanced to the World Group II play-offs, where they would get a chance to advance to the World Group II for next year.

=== New Zealand vs. Australia ===
New Zealand
0
State Tennis Centre, Perth, Australia
7 February 2009
Plexicushion (outdoors)

Australia
3

			1	2	3
1	(New Zealand) (Australia)	Dianne Hollands; Jelena Dokić	4; 6	4; 6
2	(New Zealand) (Australia)	Marina Erakovic; Samantha Stosur	1; 6	4; 6
3	(New Zealand) (Australia)	Shona Lee / Kairangi Vano; Casey Dellacqua / Rennae Stubbs	2; 6	2; 6

== Third to fourth play-offs ==
The second-placed teams from each pool were drawn in head-to-head rounds to find the third and fourth placed teams.

=== Indonesia vs. Thailand ===
Indonesia
0
State Tennis Centre, Perth, Australia
7 February 2009
Plexicushion (outdoors)

Thailand
3

			1	2	3
1	(Indonesia) (Thailand)	Jessy Rompies; Varatchaya Wongteanchai	4; 6	6; 2	4; 6
2	(Indonesia) (Thailand)	Lavinia Tananta; Noppawan Lertcheewakarn	1; 6			retired
3	(Indonesia) (Thailand)	Sandy Gumulya / Jessy Rompies; Noppawan Lertcheewakarn / Tamarine Tanasugarn	4; 6	2; 6

== Fifth to sixth play-off ==
The third placed teams of each pool were placed against each other in a ties. The winner of the tie was allocated fifth place in the Group while the loser was allocated sixth.

=== Uzbekistan vs. South Korea ===
Uzbekistan
2
State Tennis Centre, Perth, Australia
5 February 2009
Plexicushion (outdoors)

South Korea
1

			1	2	3
1	(Uzbekistan) (South Korea)	Albina Khabibulina; Yu Min-hwa	6; 2	2; 6	1; 6
2	(Uzbekistan) (South Korea)	Akgul Amanmuradova; Lee Ye-ra	6; 3	6; 4
3	(Uzbekistan) (South Korea)	Albina Khabibulina / Alexandra Kolesnichenko; Chang Kyung-mi / Lee Jin-a	6; 3	3; 6	6; 3

== Relegation play-offs ==
The last placed teams of each pool were placed against each other in a head-to-head round. The losing team was relegated to Group II for next year.

=== India vs. Chinese Taipei ===
India
0
State Tennis Centre, Perth, Australia
7 February 2009
Plexicushion (outdoors)

Chinese Taipei
3

			1	2	3
1	(India) (Chinese Taipei)	Rushmi Chakravarthi; Hwang I-hsuan	2; 6	5; 7
2	(India) (Chinese Taipei)	Ankita Bhambri; Chan Chin-wei	5; 7	1; 6
3	(India) (Chinese Taipei)	Sanaa Bhambri / Rushmi Chakravarthi; Chan Chin-wei / Chuang Chia-jung	4; 6	2; 6

== Final placements ==
Placing	Teams
Promoted	Australia
Second	New Zealand
Third	Thailand
Fourth	Indonesia
Fifth	Uzbekistan
Sixth	South Korea
Seventh	Chinese Taipei
Relegated	India

- Australia advanced to the World Group II play-offs, and were drawn against Switzerland. They won 3–2, and thus advanced to World Group II.
- India was relegated down to Asia/Oceania Zone Group II for the next year, where they placed first overall and thus achieved advancement back to Group I for 2011.
