= 2006 Fed Cup Asia/Oceania Zone Group I – Pool B =

Group B of the 2006 Fed Cup Asia/Oceania Zone Group I was one of two pools in the Asia/Oceania Zone Group I of the 2006 Fed Cup. Four teams competed in a round robin competition, with the top team and the bottom two teams proceeding to their respective sections of the play-offs: the top teams played for advancement to the World Group II Play-offs, while the bottom teams faced potential relegation to Group II.

		(India) IND	(New Zealand) NZL	(Chinese Taipei) TPE	(Philippines) PHI	RR; W–L	Set; W–L	Game; W–L	Standings
29	India		2–1	2–0	2–0	3–0	13–4	91–67	1
37	New Zealand	1–2		0–2	2–0	1–2	7–10	64–69	3
44	Chinese Taipei	0–2	2–0		2–1	2–1	10–7	87–60	2
57	Philippines	0–2	0–2	1–2		0–3	4–13	50–96	4

== India vs. Chinese Taipei ==
India
2
Olympic Park, Seoul, South Korea
20 April 2006
Hard (outdoors)

Chinese Taipei
0

			1	2	3
1	(India) (Chinese Taipei)	Shikha Uberoi; Chan Yung-jan	4; 6	6; 3	6; 3
2	(India) (Chinese Taipei)	Sania Mirza; Hsieh Su-wei	6; 4	7^{7} 6^{4}
3	(India) (Chinese Taipei)	Sania Mirza / Shikha Uberoi; Chan Yung-jan / Chuang Chia-jung				not played

== India vs. Philippines ==
India
2
Olympic Park, Seoul, South Korea
20 April 2006
Hard (outdoors)

Philippines
0

			1	2	3
1	(India) (Philippines)	Isha Lakhani; Denise Dy	6; 0	7^{7} 6^{3}
2	(India) (Philippines)	Ankita Bhambri; Czarina-Mae Arévalo	6; 4	6^{2} 7^{7}	6; 2
3	(India) (Philippines)	Ankita Bhambri / Isha Lakhani; Czarina-Mae Arévalo / Denise Dy				not played

== New Zealand vs. Chinese Taipei ==
New Zealand
0
Olympic Park, Seoul, South Korea
20 April 2006
Hard (outdoors)

Chinese Taipei
2

			1	2	3
1	(New Zealand) (Chinese Taipei)	Leanne Baker; Chan Yung-jan	1; 6	0; 6
2	(New Zealand) (Chinese Taipei)	Marina Erakovic; Hsieh Su-wei	6; 4	3; 6	0; 6
3	(New Zealand) (Chinese Taipei)	Leanne Baker / Marina Erakovic; Chan Yung-jan / Chuang Chia-jung				not played

== New Zealand vs. Philippines ==
New Zealand
2
Olympic Park, Seoul, South Korea
20 April 2006
Hard (outdoors)

Philippines
0

			1	2	3
1	(New Zealand) (Philippines)	Ellen Barry; Denise Dy	6; 1	6; 0
2	(New Zealand) (Philippines)	Leanne Baker; Czarina-Mae Arévalo	4; 6	6; 3	6; 0
3	(New Zealand) (Philippines)	Marina Erakovic / Kairangi Vano; Czarina-Mae Arévalo / Denise Dy				not played

== India vs. New Zealand ==
India
2
Olympic Park, Seoul, South Korea
21 April 2006
Hard (outdoors)

New Zealand
1

			1	2	3
1	(India) (New Zealand)	Shikha Uberoi; Kairangi Vano	6; 1	6; 3
2	(India) (New Zealand)	Sania Mirza; Ellen Barry	6; 2	6; 4
3	(India) (New Zealand)	Ankita Bhambri / Isha Lakhani; Leanne Baker / Marina Erakovic	6; 4	0; 6	1; 6

== Chinese Taipei vs. Philippines ==
Chinese Taipei
2
Olympic Park, Seoul, South Korea
21 April 2006
Hard (outdoors)

Philippines
1

			1	2	3
1	(Chinese Taipei) (Philippines)	Chuang Chia-jung; Denise Dy	6; 2	3; 6	4; 6
2	(Chinese Taipei) (Philippines)	Chan Yung-jan; Czarina-Mae Arévalo	6; 2	6; 1
3	(Chinese Taipei) (Philippines)	Chan Yung-jan / Chuang Chia-jung; Czarina-Mae Arévalo / Denise Dy	6; 3	6; 1

== See also ==
- Fed Cup structure
