= 2006 Fed Cup Asia/Oceania Zone =

Subsection of tennis competition

The Asia/Oceania Zone was one of three zones of regional competition in the 2006 Fed Cup.

== Group I ==
- Venue: Olympic Park, Seoul, South Korea (outdoor hard)
- Date: 20–22 April

The seven teams were divided into one pool of four teams and one pool of three teams. The teams that finished first in the pools played-off to determine which team would partake in the World Group II Play-offs. The four nations coming last or second-to-last in the pools also played-off to determine which would be relegated to Group II for 2007.

=== Pools ===
	Pool A	AUS	KOR	UZB
1	Australia (2–0)		3–0	2–0
2	South Korea (1–1)	0–3		2–0
3	Uzbekistan (0–2)	0–2	0–2	

	Pool B	IND	TPE	NZL	PHI
1	India (3–0)		2–0	2–1	2–0
2	Chinese Taipei (2–1)	0–2		2–0	2–1
3	New Zealand (1–2)	1–2	0–2		2–0
4	Philippines (0–3)	0–2	1–2	0–2	

=== Play-offs ===
Placing	A Team	Score	B Team
Promotion	Australia	2–1	India
3rd	N/A		Chinese Taipei
Relegation	South Korea	3–0	Philippines
Relegation	Uzbekistan	2–1	New Zealand

- Australia advanced to 2006 World Group II Play-offs.
- New Zealand and Philippines was relegated to Group II for 2007.

== Group II ==
- Venue: Olympic Park, Seoul, South Korea (outdoor hard)
- Date: 20–21 April

The four teams played in one pool of four, with the two teams placing first and second in the pool advancing to Group I for 2006.

=== Pool ===
	Pool	HKG	KAZ	SIN	SYR
1	Hong Kong (3–0)		2–0	2–0	3–0
2	Kazakhstan (2–1)	0–2		2–1	2–0
3	Singapore (1–2)	0–2	1–2		2–0
4	Syria (0–3)	0–3	0–2	0–2	

- Hong Kong and Kazakhstan advanced to Group I for 2007.

== See also ==
- Fed Cup structure
