= 2005 Fed Cup World Group play-offs =

Part of tennis tournament

The World Group play-offs were four ties which involved the losing nations of the World Group first round and the winning nations of the World Group II. Nations that won their play-off ties entered the 2006 World Group, while losing nations joined the 2006 World Group II.

== Switzerland vs. Austria ==
Switzerland
1
Lausanne, Switzerland
9–10 July 2005
Clay (outdoors)

Austria
4

			1	2	3
1	(Switzerland) (Austria)	Stefanie Vögele; Yvonne Meusburger	6^{4} 7^{7}	1; 6
2	(Switzerland) (Austria)	Timea Bacsinszky; Tamira Paszek	3; 6	3; 6
3	(Switzerland) (Austria)	Timea Bacsinszky; Yvonne Meusburger	6; 3	6; 4
4	(Switzerland) (Austria)	Myriam Casanova; Tamira Paszek	1; 6	3; 6
5	(Switzerland) (Austria)	Stefanie Vögele / Gaëlle Widmer; Daniela Klemenschits / Sandra Klemenschits	0; 6	2; 6

== Belgium vs. Argentina ==
Belgium
3
Bree, Belgium
9–10 July 2005
Hard (outdoors)

Argentina
2

			1	2	3
1	(Belgium) (Argentina)	Kim Clijsters; Mariana Díaz Oliva	6; 1	6; 2
2	(Belgium) (Argentina)	Els Callens; Gisela Dulko	1; 6	3; 6
3	(Belgium) (Argentina)	Kim Clijsters; Gisela Dulko	6; 4	6; 1
4	(Belgium) (Argentina)	Kirsten Flipkens; Mariana Díaz Oliva	2; 6	2; 6
5	(Belgium) (Argentina)	Els Callens / Kim Clijsters; Mariana Díaz Oliva / Gisela Dulko	6; 4	3; 6	7; 5

== Croatia vs. Germany ==
Croatia
1
Bol, Croatia
9–10 July 2005
Clay (outdoors)

Germany
4

			1	2	3
1	(Croatia) (Germany)	Karolina Šprem; Julia Schruff	6; 3	6; 4
2	(Croatia) (Germany)	Jelena Kostanić; Anna-Lena Grönefeld	1; 6	6^{5} 7^{7}
3	(Croatia) (Germany)	Karolina Šprem; Anna-Lena Grönefeld	3; 6	7^{7} 6^{5}	2; 6
4	(Croatia) (Germany)	Jelena Kostanić; Sandra Klösel	2; 6	4; 6
5	(Croatia) (Germany)	Sanda Mamić / Nika Ožegović; Anna-Lena Grönefeld / Julia Schruff	6; 4	3; 6	3; 6

== Czech Republic vs. Italy ==
Czech Republic
2
Liberec, Czech Republic
9–10 July 2005
Carpet (indoors)

Italy
3

			1	2	3
1	(Czech Republic) (Italy)	Květa Peschke; Francesca Schiavone	4; 6	5; 7
2	(Czech Republic) (Italy)	Nicole Vaidišová; Roberta Vinci	6; 3	6; 4
3	(Czech Republic) (Italy)	Nicole Vaidišová; Francesca Schiavone	6; 2	7; 5
4	(Czech Republic) (Italy)	Květa Peschke; Flavia Pennetta	4; 6	6; 4	2; 6
5	(Czech Republic) (Italy)	Květa Peschke / Nicole Vaidišová; Francesca Schiavone / Roberta Vinci	4; 6	4; 6

== See also ==
- Fed Cup structure
