= 2009 Pacific Mini Games =

VIII Pacific Mini Games
- Host city: Rarotonga
- Country: Cook Islands
- Nations: 21
- Events: 15 sports
- Opening: 21 September 2009
- Closing: 2 October 2009
- Opened by: Sir Frederick Tutu Goodwin; Queen's Representative
- Torch lighter: Patricia Taea, Daniel Tutai
- Main venue: Avarua Tereora Stadium

The 2009 Pacific Mini Games was held in the Cook Islands from 21 September to 2 October. It was the 8th edition of the Pacific Mini Games.

Torch lighters were the athletes Daniel Tutai and Patricia Taea, the Cook Islands' junior sportsman and sportswoman of the year for 2008.

== Participating countries ==
There were 21 countries participating at the 2009 Games:

- American Samoa(16)
- Cook Islands(227)
- Federated States of Micronesia(6)
- Fiji(167)
- Guam(17)
- Kiribati(41)
- Nauru(17)
- /New Caledonia(106)
- Niue(104)
- Norfolk Island(8)
- Northern Mariana Islands(3)
- Palau(5)
- Papua New Guinea(123)
- Samoa(160)
- Solomon Islands
- Tahiti (159)
- Tokelau(31)
- Tonga(104)
- Tuvalu(4)
- Vanuatu(14)
- Wallis and Futuna(42)
Note: A number in parentheses indicate the size of a country's team (athletes and officials, where known).

== Sports ==
15 sports were contested at the 2009 Games:

- Athletics (41) ^{a}
- Bowls (8) ^{b}
- Boxing (9) ^{c}
- Golf (4) ^{d}^{,}^{∗}
- Netball (1) ^{e}
- Rugby league sevens (1) ^{f}
- Rugby sevens (1) ^{g}
- Sailing (6) ^{h}
- Squash (4) ^{i}
- Table tennis (7) ^{j}
- Tennis (7) ^{k}
- Touch rugby (3) ^{l}
- Triathlon (3) ^{m}
- Va'a (10) ^{n}
- Weightlifting (39) ^{o}
Note: Numbers in parentheses indicate the number of medal events contested in each sport (where known).

== See also ==
- Athletics at the 2009 Pacific Mini Games
- Tennis at the 2009 Pacific Mini Games

== Notes ==
^* Errors – The official website lists all 2009 medal winners, but while athletes' names appear correct, their recorded nationalities are mismatched in some cases. e.g. New Caledonians are listed as from Federated States of Micronesia, Fijians are listed as from Niue).

^a Athletics – There were 21 men's events and 20 women's events contested.

^b Bowls – Singles, pairs, triples and fours were played for both men and women for a total of eight events. In the women's competition, the Cook Islands won all events except the singles for which the gold medal was claimed by Niue. The Cook Islands' David Akaruru also won the men's singles gold medal, with the remaining men's events being won by Fiji.

^c Boxing – In 2009, although there were ten weight divisions scheduled, medals were only ultimately awarded in nine of them. Only two boxers were entered for the Flyweight 51 kg division. Samoa's Kaisa Ioane was given a walkover when his Cook Islands opponent did not appear for their bout. As no contest took place, no medals could be awarded. Of the remaining nine divisions: one title was won by each of Samoa, American Samoa, and New Caledonia, two titles were won by Nauru, and four titles were won by Tahiti.

^d Golf – Cook Islands won all four gold medals. "Pacific Mini Games 2009 - Golf - SportsTG". Archived from the original on 23 September 2017.

^e Netball – Fiji, PNG and Cook Islands were the medallists.

^f Rugby league sevens – Fiji beat Cook Islands in the final, Samoa won the bronze against Tonga.

^g"Rugby sevens". Archived from the original on 23 September 2017.

^h Sailing – In the dinghy events, host nation Cook Islands won three gold medals and Tahiti won one gold medal. New Caledonia won two gold medals in the Hobie 16.

^i Squash – Papua New Guinea took three gold medals and New Caledonia one (medals for New Caledonia incorrectly recorded for Federated States of Micronesia on official website medal listing). ("Pacific Mini Games 2009 - Squash - SportsTG". Archived from the original on 23 September 2017.

^j"Table tennis". Archived from the original on 23 September 2017.

^k"Tennis". Archived from the original on 23 September 2017.

^l"Touch rugby". Archived from the original on 23 September 2017.

^m"Triathlon". Archived from the original on 23 September 2017.

^n"Va'a". Archived from the original on 23 September 2017.

^o Weightlifting – There were eight divisions for men, and five divisions for women, with three gold medals offered within each division.

== Sources ==
- VIIIth Pacific Mini Games Report (Report). 2009. Archived from the original on 24 September 2015.
