= Olympic Park, Seoul =

Park in Seoul, South Korea

Olympic Park
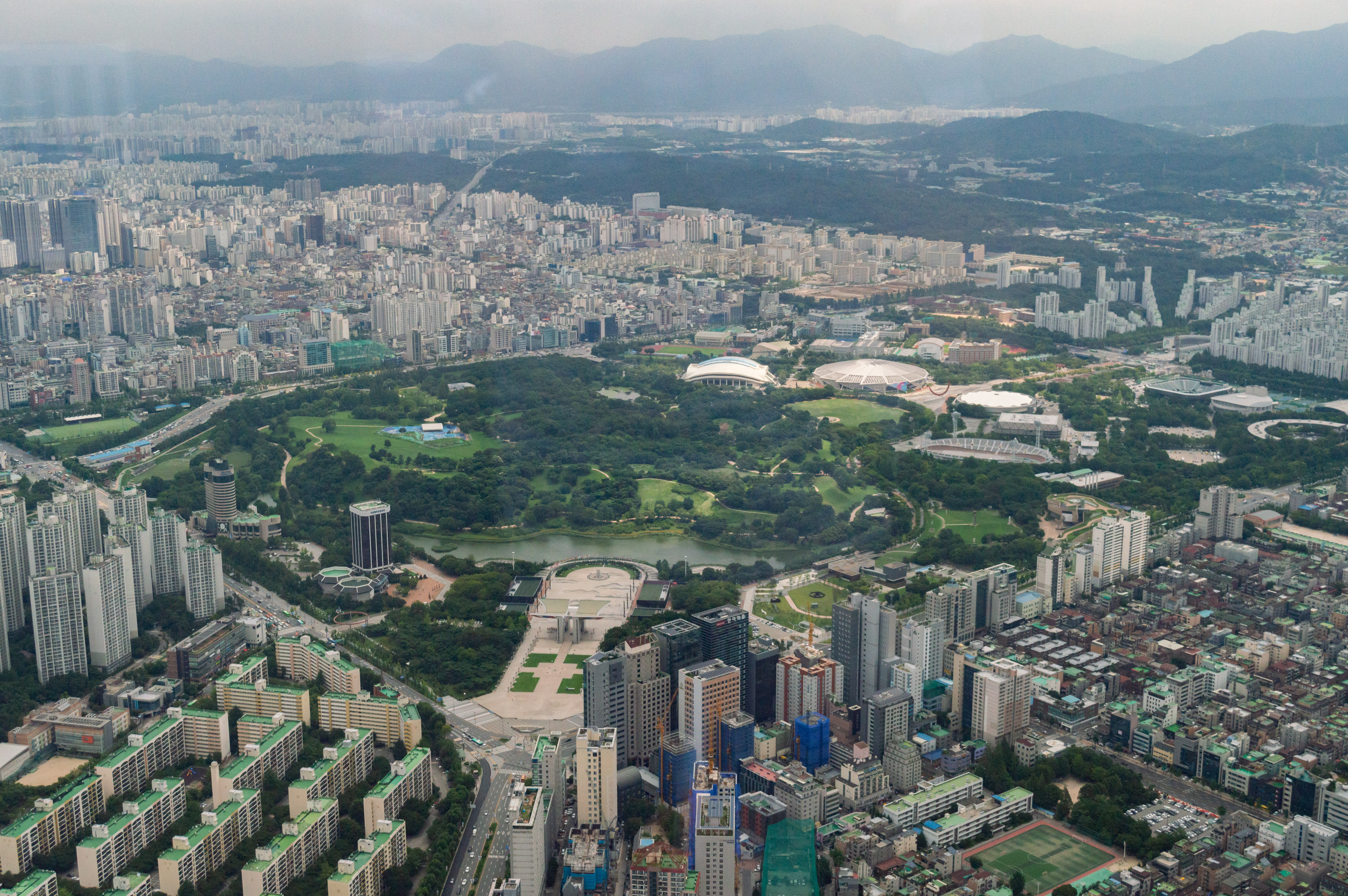
- The park, as seen from the Lotte World Tower observation deck (2019)
- Interactive map of Olympic Park
- Location: Songpa District, Seoul, South Korea
- Coordinates: 37.5207°N 127.1227°E
- Website: www.ksponco.or.kr/olympicpark/english

Korean name
- Hangul: 올림픽 공원
- Hanja: 올림픽 公園
- RR: Ollimpik gongwon
- MR: Ollimp'ik kongwŏn

Olympic Park (Korean: 올림픽 공원), short name Olpark (올팍), is an Olympic Park in Bangi-dong, Songpa District, Seoul, South Korea, opened on May 28, 1986. Built at a cost of US$200 million, it was built to host the 1986 Asian Games and the 1988 Summer Olympics. The two nearest subway stations are Mongchontoseong and Olympic Park.

== Competition facilities ==
- SK Olympic Handball Gymnasium – formerly known as Olympic Fencing Gymnasium
- Olympic Gymnastics Arena
- Olympic Swimming Pool
- Olympic Tennis Courts
- Olympic Velodrome

== Other facilities ==
- Olympic Weightlifting Gymnasium – currently known as Woori Art Hall
- Korea National Sports University
- Korea Skating Union
- Mongchontoseong
- Olympic Sculpture Park (It houses approximately 200 sculptures done by artists of all around the World, expressing different concepts)
- Olympic Parktel Hotel
- Olympic Hall
- Olympic Museum
- SOMA Museum of Art
- World Peace Gate
- Flag Plaza (with the presence of the flags of the countries that competed in the 1988 Summer Olympics)
- Rose Park
- Waterside Stage
- Music Fountain
- Hanseong Baekje Museum

=== World Peace Gate ===
Built between December 31, 1986, and August 31, 1988, it was designed by the architect Kim Chung-up to celebrate the motto and the concepts from Seoul 1988 Summer Olympics (peace and harmony) and also to symbolize the ability of the Korean people. Alongside the pillars there are structures similar to wings, under which there's a mural called "A Painting of Four Spirits". In the mural are shown a phoenix, a turtle, a tiger and a dragon (the spirits that guard the gate) ascending towards heaven, representing the strength of Koreans and their freedom.

Under the gate is the 1988 Summer Paralympics eternal flame, as well as a declaration of peace calling for world harmony and happiness for all citizens of the world.

== Gallery ==
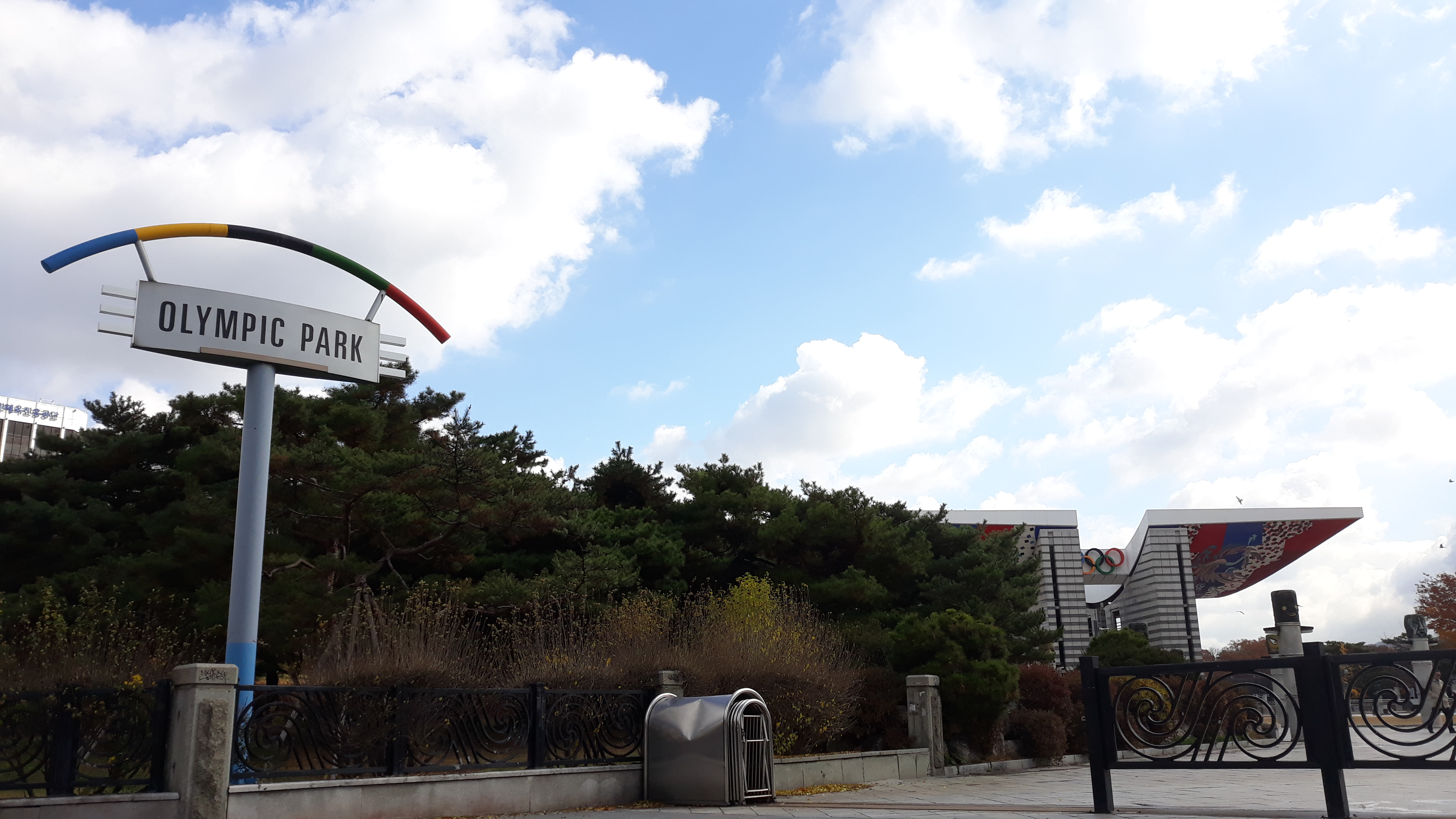
Entrance to the Olympic Park in November 2018

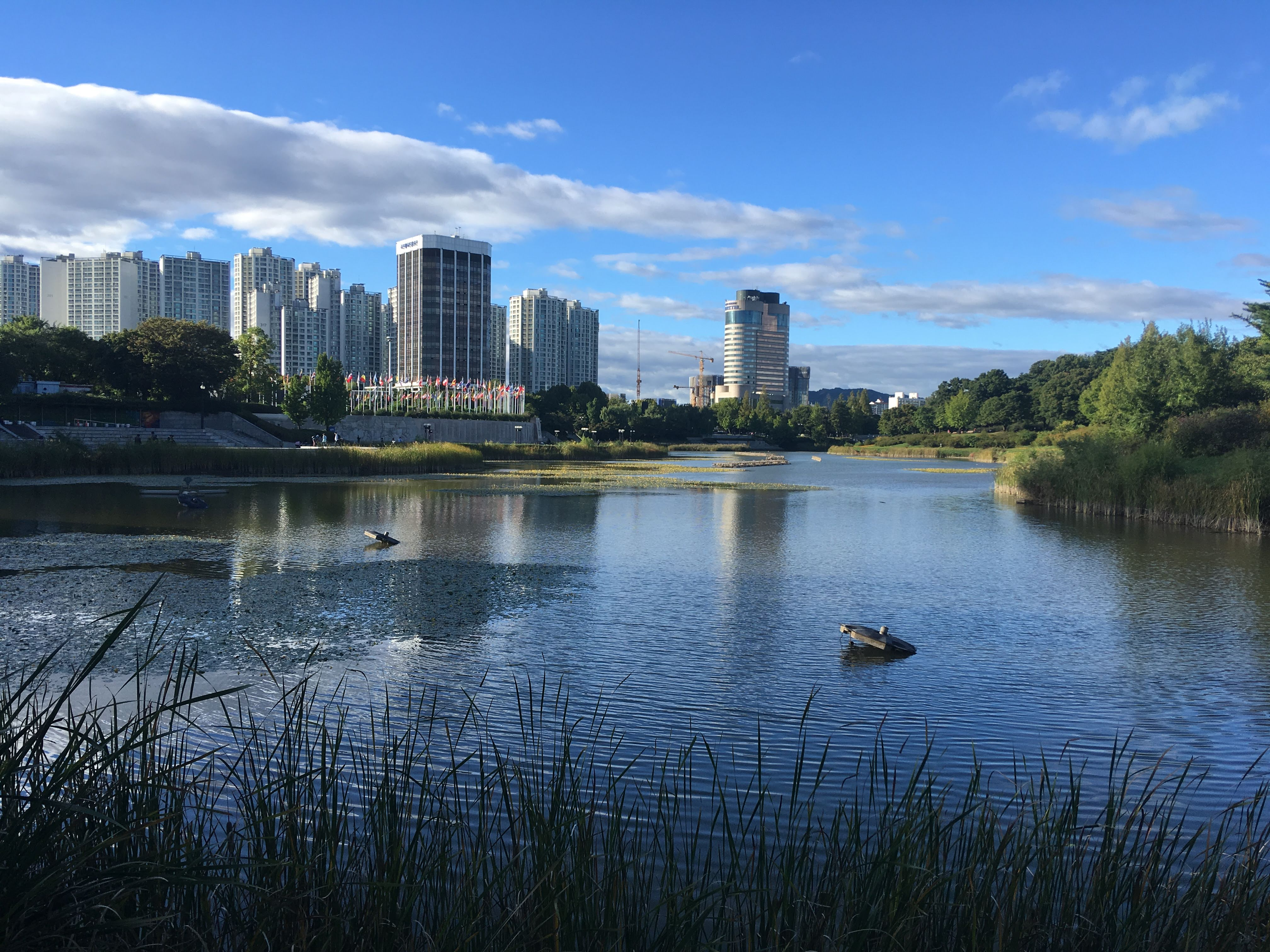
Olympic Park in October 2018

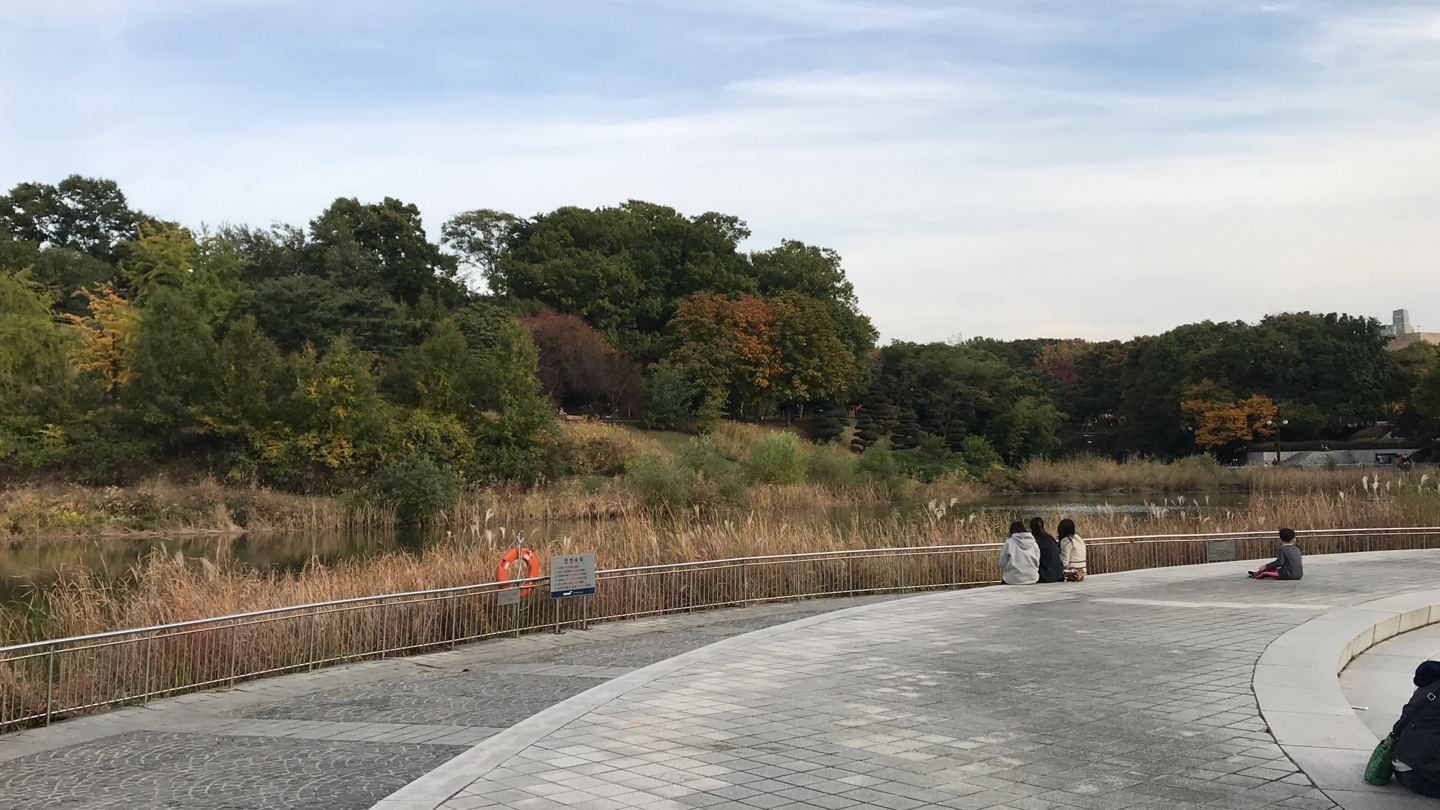
Olympic Park in Autumn with Reeds

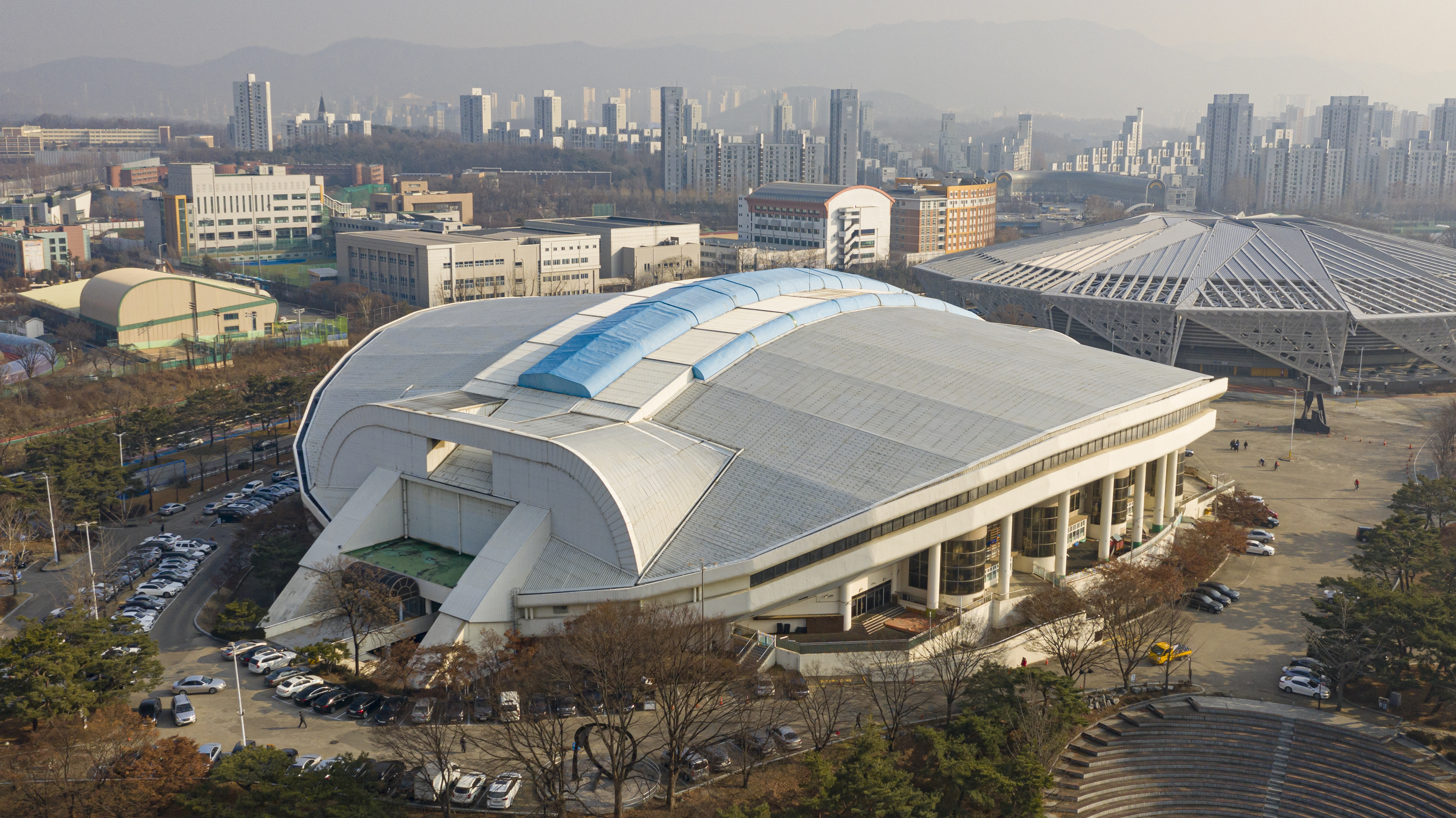
Olympic Swimming Pool in 2020

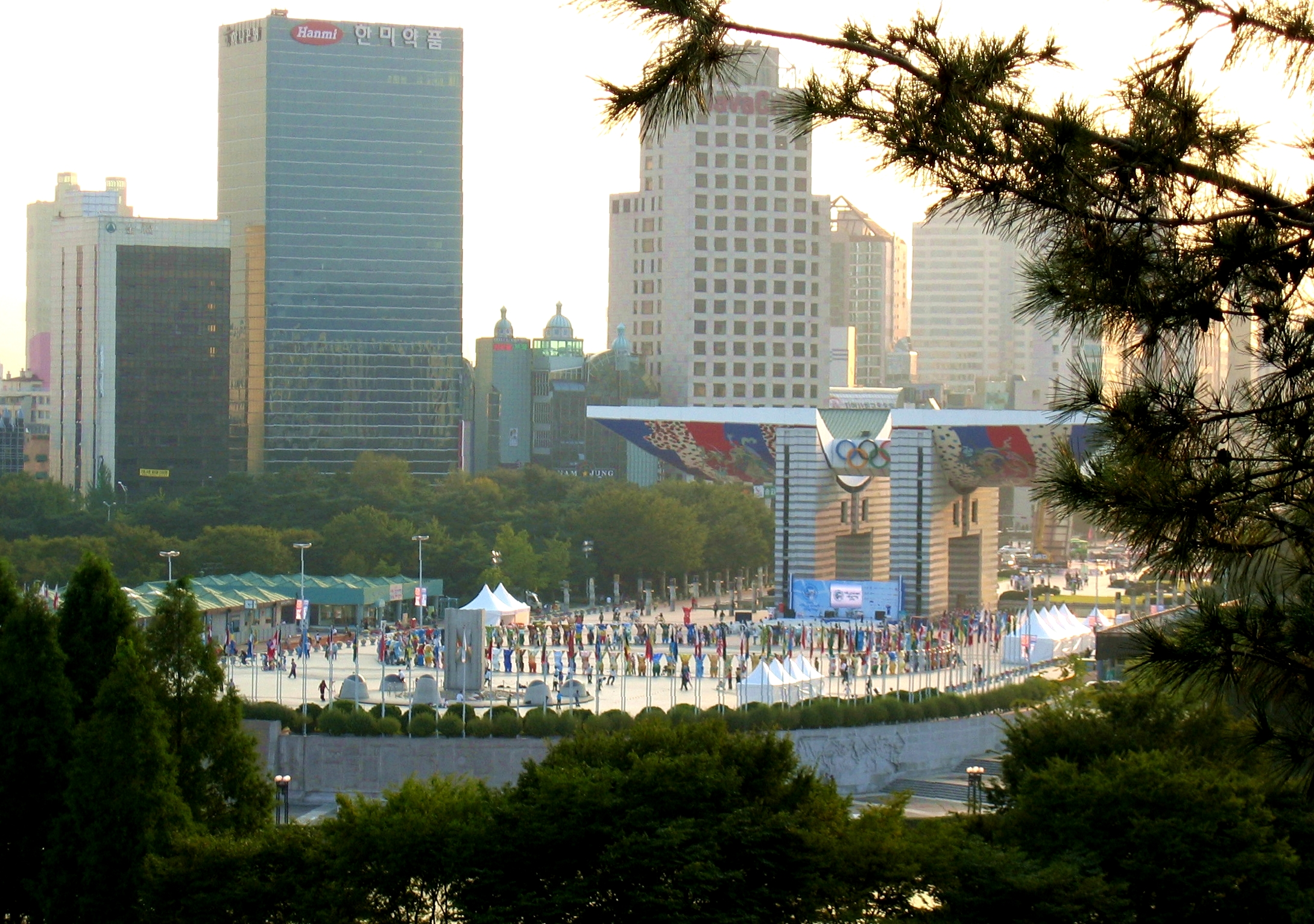
The unifying United Buddy Bears exhibition was shown at the Olympic Park in Seoul in 2005.

World Peace Gate, Olympic Park (2018)

== See also ==
- Olympic Stadium (Seoul)
