= 2000 Fed Cup World Group =

Part of tennis tournament

- Date: 27 April – 25 November
- Edition: 10th

Champions
- United States
← 1999 ·	Fed Cup	· 2001 →

The World Group was the highest level of competition in the 2000 Fed Cup. This year, the World Group and World Group II merged to become one group, with one more team joining the Group from last year's World Group II Play-offs. Twelve teams were put into three pools of four teams each, with the winner of each pool joining defending champions the United States in a four-team play-off.

The defending champions claimed their seventeenth title, defeating five-time champions Spain in the final.

== Participating teams ==
Participating teams
Australia	Austria	Belgium	Croatia	Czech Republic
France	Germany	Italy	Russia	
Slovakia	Spain	Switzerland	United States	

== Pools ==
=== Pool A ===
Venue: Bari T.C., Bari, Italy (outdoor clay)

Date: 27–30 April

	Pool A	ESP	GER	ITA	CRO
1	Spain (3–0)		2–1	3–0	2–1
2	Germany (2–1)	1–2		2–1	2–1
3	Italy (1–2)	0–3	1–2		3–0
4	Croatia (0–3)	1–2	1–2	0–3	

=== Pool B ===
Venue: Incheba Hall, Bratislava, Slovakia (indoor hard)

Date: 27–30 April

	Pool B	CZE	SUI	AUT	SVK
1	Czech Republic (3–0)		2–1	2–1	2–1
2	Switzerland (2–1)	1–2		2–1	2–1
3	Austria (1–2)	1–2	1–2		2–0
4	Slovakia (0–3)	1–2	1–2	0–2	

=== Pool C ===
Venue: Olympic Stadium, Moscow, Russia (indoor carpet)

Date: 27–30 April

	Pool C	BEL	FRA	RUS	AUS
1	Belgium (3–0)		2–1	2–1	2–1
2	France (2–1)	1–2		3–0	2–1
3	Russia (1–2)	1–2	0–3		2–1
4	Australia (0–3)	1–2	1–2	1–2	

== Knockout stage ==
Venue: Mandalay Bay Events Center, Las Vegas, NV, United States (supreme carpet, indoor)

Date: 21–25 November

Semifinals; 21–22 November
1	United States	2
Belgium	1
Czech Republic	1
2	Spain	2

Final; 24–25 November
1	United States	5
2	Spain	0

== See also ==
- Fed Cup structure
