= 2001 Fed Cup World Group play-offs =

Part of tennis tournament

The World Group play-offs were the qualifiers for the highest level of competition in the 2001 Fed Cup and the 2002 Fed Cup.

== First round ==
The first round involved the winners of Zonal Competition from last year (Argentina, Hungary, Japan) being randomly drawn against five teams from the 2000 World Group pools. The winners were guaranteed a spot in the World Group next year.

=== Italy vs. Croatia ===
Italy
4
Palasport Bassano, Bassano del Grappa, Italy
28–29 April 2001
Greenset Trophy carpet (indoors)

Croatia
1

			1	2	3
1	(Italy) (Croatia)	Giulia Casoni; Jelena Kostanić	3; 6	6^{1} 7^{7}
2	(Italy) (Croatia)	Adriana Serra Zanetti; Silvija Talaja	6; 1	6; 1
3	(Italy) (Croatia)	Giulia Casoni; Matea Mezak	6; 2	6; 4
4	(Italy) (Croatia)	Adriana Serra Zanetti; Jelena Kostanić	6; 1	7^{7} 6^{5}
5	(Italy) (Croatia)	Gloria Pizzichini / Roberta Vinci; Matea Mezak / Karolina Šprem	6; 1	7; 5

=== Japan vs. Argentina ===
Japan
1
Ariake Coliseum, Tokyo, Japan
28–29 April 2001
Plexipave (indoors)

Argentina
4

			1	2	3
1	(Japan) (Argentina)	Saori Obata; María Emilia Salerni	4; 6	2; 6
2	(Japan) (Argentina)	Shinobu Asagoe; Clarisa Fernández	3; 6	6; 4	8; 10
3	(Japan) (Argentina)	Yuka Yoshida; María Emilia Salerni	5; 7	0; 6
4	(Japan) (Argentina)	Saori Obata; Clarisa Fernández	2; 6	7; 5		retired
5	(Japan) (Argentina)	Rika Hiraki / Yuka Yoshida; Laura Montalvo / María Emilia Salerni	4; 6	4; 6

=== Slovakia vs. Hungary ===
Slovakia
4
NTC Stadium, Bratislava, Slovakia
28–29 April 2001
Red clay (outdoors)

Hungary
1

			1	2	3
1	(Slovakia) (Hungary)	Daniela Hantuchová; Rita Kuti-Kis	6; 4	6; 4
2	(Slovakia) (Hungary)	Henrieta Nagyová; Anikó Kapros	4; 6	6; 2	7; 5
3	(Slovakia) (Hungary)	Henrieta Nagyová; Rita Kuti-Kis	2; 6	7^{10} 6^{8}	7; 5
4	(Slovakia) (Hungary)	Daniela Hantuchová; Petra Mandula	6; 3	6; 4
5	(Slovakia) (Hungary)	Karina Habšudová / Daniela Hantuchová; Anikó Kapros / Petra Mandula	2; 6	7; 5	5; 7

=== Australia vs. Austria ===
Australia
5
Memorial Drive, Adelaide, Australia
28–29 April 2001
Grass (outdoors)

Austria
0

			1	2	3
1	(Australia) (Austria)	Nicole Pratt; Marion Maruska	7; 5	6; 2
2	(Australia) (Austria)	Alicia Molik; Sylvia Plischke	6; 3	1; 6	6; 0
3	(Australia) (Austria)	Nicole Pratt; Sylvia Plischke	6; 4	6; 2
4	(Australia) (Austria)	Alicia Molik; Marion Maruska	6; 2	6; 2
5	(Australia) (Austria)	Evie Dominikovic / Rachel McQuillan; Marion Maruska / Patricia Wartusch	6; 4	7; 5

== Second round ==
The winners of the first round played off against four other teams from the 2000 World Group pools in the top section, with the winners proceeding to the World Group. The losers of the first round played off against this year's zonal competition winners in the bottom section, with the winners remaining in World Group for next year, and the losers proceeding to Zonal Competition for next year.

=== Top Section ===
==== Italy vs. France ====
Italy
1
Stade Jean Bouloumie, Vittel, France
21–22 July 2001
Greenset hard (outdoors)

France
4

			1	2	3
1	(Italy) (France)	Maria Elena Camerin; Amélie Mauresmo	4; 6	0; 6
2	(Italy) (France)	Adriana Serra Zanetti; Sandrine Testud	4; 6	5; 7
3	(Italy) (France)	Adriana Serra Zanetti; Amélie Mauresmo	2; 6	0; 6
4	(Italy) (France)	Maria Elena Camerin; Sandrine Testud	3; 6	1; 6
5	(Italy) (France)	Giulia Casoni / Roberta Vinci; Nathalie Dechy / Virginie Razzano	4; 6	6; 2	6; 4

==== Argentina vs. Germany ====
Argentina
4
Am Rothenbaum, Hamburg, Germany
21–22 July 2001
Red clay (outdoors)

Germany
1

			1	2	3
1	(Argentina) (Germany)	María Emilia Salerni; Anke Huber	6; 4	2; 6	1; 6
2	(Argentina) (Germany)	Paola Suárez; Barbara Rittner	3; 6	6; 3	6; 2
3	(Argentina) (Germany)	Paola Suárez; Anke Huber	4; 6	6; 3	12; 10
4	(Argentina) (Germany)	María Emilia Salerni; Barbara Rittner	6; 2	6^{7} 7^{9}	6; 2
5	(Argentina) (Germany)	Clarisa Fernández / Laura Montalvo; Andrea Glass / Bianka Lamade	6; 4	5; 7	6; 2

==== Slovakia vs. Russia ====
Slovakia
2
NTC Stadium, Bratislava, Slovakia
21–22 July 2001
Red clay (outdoors)

Russia
3

			1	2	3
1	(Slovakia) (Russia)	Henrieta Nagyová; Lina Krasnoroutskaya	6; 4	6; 3
2	(Slovakia) (Russia)	Daniela Hantuchová; Elena Dementieva	2; 6	6^{6} 7^{8}
3	(Slovakia) (Russia)	Henrieta Nagyová; Elena Dementieva	3; 6	6^{7} 7^{9}
4	(Slovakia) (Russia)	Daniela Hantuchová; Elena Likhovtseva	6; 1	6; 3
5	(Slovakia) (Russia)	Karina Habšudová / Henrieta Nagyová; Elena Likhovtseva / Nadia Petrova				w/o

==== Australia vs. Switzerland ====
Australia
4
Royal Sydney Golf Course, Sydney, Australia
21–22 July 2001
Grass (outdoors)

Switzerland
1

			1	2	3
1	(Australia) (Switzerland)	Nicole Pratt; Myriam Casanova	6; 3	6; 1
2	(Australia) (Switzerland)	Alicia Molik; Daniela Casanova	6; 3	6; 1
3	(Australia) (Switzerland)	Alicia Molik; Myriam Casanova	6^{3} 7^{7}	4; 6
4	(Australia) (Switzerland)	Nicole Pratt; Aliénor Tricerri	6; 1	6; 2
5	(Australia) (Switzerland)	Evie Dominikovic / Rachel McQuillan; Daniela Casanova / Aliénor Tricerri	6; 3	6; 3

=== Bottom Section ===
==== Croatia vs. Venezuela ====
Croatia
4
Valencia, Venezuela
21–22 July 2001
Clay (outdoors)

Venezuela
1

			1	2	3
1	(Croatia) (Venezuela)	Matea Mezak; Milagros Sequera	6; 3	3; 6	1; 6
2	(Croatia) (Venezuela)	Jelena Kostanić; Stephanie Schaer	6; 3	6; 0
3	(Croatia) (Venezuela)	Jelena Kostanić; Milagros Sequera	4; 6	6; 1	6; 4
4	(Croatia) (Venezuela)	Matea Mezak; Stephanie Schaer	6; 4	6; 3
5	(Croatia) (Venezuela)	Sanda Mamić / Karolina Šprem; María Virginia Francesa / Milagros Sequera	6; 3	4; 6	6; 3

==== Japan vs. Sweden ====
Japan
2

21–22 July 2001
Clay (outdoors)

Sweden
3

			1	2	3
1	(Japan) (Sweden)	Rika Fujiwara; Åsa Carlsson	3; 6	1; 6
2	(Japan) (Sweden)	Shinobu Asagoe; Sofia Arvidsson	3; 6	3; 6
3	(Japan) (Sweden)	Shinobu Asagoe; Åsa Carlsson	0; 6	3; 6
4	(Japan) (Sweden)	Rika Fujiwara; Sofia Arvidsson	4; 6	6; 4	7^{7} 6^{3}
5	(Japan) (Sweden)	Rika Hiraki / Yuka Yoshida; Åsa Carlsson / Diana Majkić	6; 3	6; 1

==== Hungary vs. Israel ====
Hungary
3

21–22 July 2001
Clay (outdoors)

Israel
0

			1	2	3
1	(Hungary) (Israel)	Rita Kuti-Kis; Anna Smashnova	6; 1	4; 6	6; 2
2	(Hungary) (Israel)	Petra Mandula; Tzipora Obziler	6; 2	1; 6	6; 4
3	(Hungary) (Israel)	Petra Mandula; Anna Smashnova	6; 3	4; 6	6; 1
4	(Hungary) (Israel)	Zsófia Gubacsi; Cheli Bargil				not played
5	(Hungary) (Israel)	Zsófia Gubacsi / Anikó Kapros; Tzipora Obziler / Hila Rosen				not played

==== Austria vs. Indonesia ====
Austria
3

21–22 July 2001
Clay (outdoors)

Indonesia
2

			1	2	3
1	(Austria) (Indonesia)	Barbara Schett; Angelique Widjaja	6; 1	6; 3
2	(Austria) (Indonesia)	Barbara Schwartz; Wynne Prakusya	6; 0	6; 1
3	(Austria) (Indonesia)	Barbara Schett; Wynne Prakusya	6; 2	6; 0
4	(Austria) (Indonesia)	Barbara Schwartz; Romana Tedjakusuma	5; 7	2; 2		retired
5	(Austria) (Indonesia)	Marion Maruska / Patricia Wartusch; Yayuk Basuki / Wynne Prakusya	1; 6	3; 6

== See also ==
- Fed Cup structure
