= 1978 Federation Cup (tennis) =

International women's tennis competition

Details
- Duration: 27 November – 3 December
- Edition: 16th

Champion
- Winning nation: United States

The 1978 Federation Cup was the 16th edition of the most important competition between national teams in women's tennis. The tournament was held at the Kooyong Lawn Tennis Club in Melbourne, Australia, from 27 November – 3 December. The United States won their third consecutive title, defeating Australia in their eighth final.

== Qualifying round ==
Date	Winning team	Score	Losing team
16 August	Ireland	2–1	Finland
19 August	South Korea	3–0	Chinese Taipei
19 August	Philippines	3–0	Thailand

=== Ireland vs. Finland ===
Ireland
2
Kooyong Lawn Tennis Club, Melbourne, Australia
16 August 1978
Grass (outdoor)

Finland
1

			1	2	3
1	(Republic of Ireland) (Finland)	Jo Sheridan; Pirjo Ojala	4; 6	6; 3	3; 6
2	(Republic of Ireland) (Finland)	Helen Lennon; Elina Durchman	6; 2	2; 6	6; 1
3	(Republic of Ireland) (Finland)	Bernadette Davy / Helen Lennon; Elina Durchman / Pirjo Ojala	6; 3	6; 2

=== South Korea vs. Chinese Taipei ===
South Korea
3
Kooyong Lawn Tennis Club, Melbourne, Australia
19 August 1978
Grass (outdoor)

Chinese Taipei
0

			1	2	3
1	(South Korea) (Chinese Taipei)	Kim Nam-sook; Ho Chiu-mei	6; 0	6; 0
2	(South Korea) (Chinese Taipei)	Lee Duk-hee; Wen Hsiu-tsuan	6; 3	6; 1
3	(South Korea) (Chinese Taipei)	Lee Duk-hee / Yang Jeong-soon; Hsieh Li-chuan / Lee Hsiu	6; 0	6; 0

=== Philippines vs. Thailand ===
Philippines
3
Kooyong Lawn Tennis Club, Melbourne, Australia
19 August 1978
Grass (outdoor)

Thailand
0

			1	2	3
1	(Philippines) (Thailand)	Gladys Imperial; Chalada Wattana	7; 5	6; 3
2	(Philippines) (Thailand)	Marisa Sanchez; Suthasini Sirikaya	7^{7} 6^{5}	6; 3
3	(Philippines) (Thailand)	Carmencita de la Rosa / Gladys Imperial; Chalada Wattana / Sirikanya Hoonsiri	6; 3	6; 1

== Main draw ==
Participating Teams
Argentina	Australia	Austria	Belgium	Brazil	Canada	Chile	Czechoslovakia
Denmark	France	Great Britain	Indonesia	Ireland	Israel	Italy	Japan
Mexico	Netherlands	New Zealand	Norway	Philippines	Portugal	Romania	South Korea
Soviet Union	Spain	Sweden	Switzerland	United States	Uruguay	West Germany	Yugoslavia

All ties were played at the Kooyong Lawn Tennis Club in Melbourne, Australia, on grass courts.|}

First Round
United States	3
Q	South Korea	0
Canada	0
New Zealand	3
Argentina	2
Denmark	1
Sweden	1
France	2
Czechoslovakia	3
Portugal	0
Q	Philippines	1
Indonesia	2
West Germany	3
Brazil	0
Spain	0
Great Britain	3
Soviet Union	3
Austria	0
Yugoslavia	3
Norway	0
Romania	2
Italy	1
Q	Ireland	0
Switzerland	3
Netherlands	3
Mexico	0
Chile	3
Uruguay	0
Israel	0
Japan	3
Belgium	0
Australia	3

Second Round
United States	3
New Zealand	0
Argentina	0
France	3
Czechoslovakia	3
Indonesia	0
West Germany	1
Great Britain	2
Soviet Union	0
Yugoslavia	3
Romania	2
Switzerland	1
Netherlands	3
Chile	0
Japan	0
Australia	3

Quarterfinals
United States	3
France	0
Czechoslovakia	1
Great Britain	2
Soviet Union	3
Romania	0
Netherlands	0
Australia	3

Semifinals
United States	3
Great Britain	0
Soviet Union	1
Australia	2

Final
United States	2
Australia	1

=== First round ===
==== United States vs. South Korea ====
United States
3
Kooyong Lawn Tennis Club, Melbourne, Australia
November 1978
Grass (outdoor)

South Korea
0

			1	2	3
1	(United States) (South Korea)	Tracy Austin; Choi Kyeong-mi	6; 0	6; 0
2	(United States) (South Korea)	Chris Evert; Han Yoon-ja	6; 1	6; 0
3	(United States) (South Korea)	Chris Evert / Billie Jean King; Cha Eun-jeong / Choi Kyeong-mi	6; 1	6; 0

==== Canada vs. New Zealand ====
Canada
0
Kooyong Lawn Tennis Club, Melbourne, Australia
November 1978
Grass (outdoor)

New Zealand
3

			1	2	3
1	(Canada) (New Zealand)	Wendy Barlow; Brenda Perry	6; 4	9; 11	2; 6
2	(Canada) (New Zealand)	Marjorie Blackwood; Judy Chaloner	7; 5	4; 6	5; 7
3	(Canada) (New Zealand)	Wendy Barlow / Lisette Senn; Judy Chaloner / Chris Newton	4; 6	3; 6

==== Argentina vs. Denmark ====
Argentina
2
Kooyong Lawn Tennis Club, Melbourne, Australia
November 1978
Grass (outdoor)

Denmark
1

			1	2	3
1	(Argentina) (Denmark)	Raquel Giscafré; Anne-Mette Sorensen	6; 2	6; 4
2	(Argentina) (Denmark)	Ivanna Madruga-Osses; Dorte Ekner	11; 9	2; 6	6; 4
3	(Argentina) (Denmark)	Viviana González / Ivanna Madruga-Osses; Dorte Ekner / Helle Sparre-Viragh	7; 9	5; 7

==== Sweden vs. France ====
Sweden
1
Kooyong Lawn Tennis Club, Melbourne, Australia
November 1978
Grass (outdoor)

France
2

			1	2	3
1	(Sweden) (France)	Elisabeth Ekblom; Gail Benedetti	3; 6	3; 6
2	(Sweden) (France)	Nina Bohm; Françoise Dürr	4; 6	1; 6
3	(Sweden) (France)	Nina Bohm / Elisabeth Ekblom; Brigitte Simon / Frédérique Thibault	6; 2	6; 2

==== Czechoslovakia vs. Portugal ====
Czechoslovakia
3
Kooyong Lawn Tennis Club, Melbourne, Australia
November 1978
Grass (outdoor)

Portugal
0

			1	2	3
1	(Czechoslovakia) (Portugal)	Renáta Tomanová; Conceição Rio	6; 0	6; 0
2	(Czechoslovakia) (Portugal)	Regina Maršíková; Leonora Peralta	6; 0	6; 0
3	(Czechoslovakia) (Portugal)	Hana Mandlíková / Hana Strachoňová; Manuel Maria Cabral Lencastre / Leonora Peralta	6; 1	6; 1

==== Philippines vs. Indonesia ====
Philippines
1
Kooyong Lawn Tennis Club, Melbourne, Australia
November 1978
Grass (outdoor)

Indonesia
2

			1	2	3
1	(Philippines) (Indonesia)	Gladys Imperial; Lita Sugiarto	2; 6	3; 6
2	(Philippines) (Indonesia)	Marisa Sanchez; Yolanda Soemarno	4; 6	6; 0	6; 0
3	(Philippines) (Indonesia)	Gladys Imperial / Marisa Sanchez; Lita Sugiarto / Yolanda Soemarno	1; 6	2; 6

==== West Germany vs. Brazil ====
West Germany
3
Kooyong Lawn Tennis Club, Melbourne, Australia
November 1978
Grass (outdoor)

Brazil
0

			1	2	3
1	(West Germany) (Brazil)	Sylvia Hanika; Vera Lúcia Giugni	6; 0	6; 1
2	(West Germany) (Brazil)	Heidi Eisterlehner; Patricia Medrado	6; 3	3; 6	6; 1
3	(West Germany) (Brazil)	Katja Ebbinghaus / Sylvia Hanika; Vera Lúcia Giugni / Patricia Medrado	6; 3	6; 4

==== Spain vs. Great Britain ====
Spain
0
Kooyong Lawn Tennis Club, Melbourne, Australia
November 1978
Grass (outdoor)

Great Britain
3

			1	2	3
1	(Spain) (United Kingdom)	Carmen Perea; Virginia Wade	8; 6	1; 6	2; 6
2	(Spain) (United Kingdom)	Mónica Álvarez de Mon; Sue Barker	0; 6	8; 10
3	(Spain) (United Kingdom)	Mónica Álvarez de Mon / Carmen Perea; Anne Hobbs / Michelle Tyler	6; 8	6; 2	2; 6

==== Soviet Union vs. Austria ====
Soviet Union
3
Kooyong Lawn Tennis Club, Melbourne, Australia
November 1978
Grass (outdoor)

Austria
0

			1	2	3
1	(Soviet Union) (Austria)	Natasha Chmyreva; Uschi Ulrich	6; 0	6; 2
2	(Soviet Union) (Austria)	Olga Morozova; Helena Wimmer	6; 1	6; 0
3	(Soviet Union) (Austria)	Natasha Chmyreva / Elena Eliseenko; Maja Hugel / Uschi Ulrich	6; 1	6; 3

==== Yugoslavia vs. Norway ====
Yugoslavia
3
Kooyong Lawn Tennis Club, Melbourne, Australia
November 1978
Grass (outdoor)

Norway
0

			1	2	3
1	(Socialist Federal Republic of Yugoslavia) (Norway)	Nenni Delmestre; Bente Kjolstad	6; 0	6; 3
2	(Socialist Federal Republic of Yugoslavia) (Norway)	Mima Jaušovec; Ellen Grindvold	6; 1	6; 2
3	(Socialist Federal Republic of Yugoslavia) (Norway)	Nenni Delmestre / Mima Jaušovec; Ellen Grindvold / Bente Kjolstad	3; 6	6; 3	6; 2

==== Romania vs. Italy ====
Romania
2
Kooyong Lawn Tennis Club, Melbourne, Australia
November 1978
Grass (outdoor)

Italy
1

			1	2	3
1	(Romania) (Italy)	Florența Mihai; Daniela Marzano	3; 6	6; 8
2	(Romania) (Italy)	Virginia Ruzici; Sabina Simmonds	6; 1	3; 6	6; 1
3	(Romania) (Italy)	Virginia Ruzici / Mariana Simionescu; Daniela Marzano / Sabina Simmonds	6; 4	6; 2

==== Ireland vs. Switzerland ====
Ireland
0
Kooyong Lawn Tennis Club, Melbourne, Australia
November 1978
Grass (outdoor)

Switzerland
3

			1	2	3
1	(Republic of Ireland) (Switzerland)	Jo Sheridan; Isabelle Villiger	1; 6	0; 6
2	(Republic of Ireland) (Switzerland)	Helen Lennon; Petra Delhees	1; 6	0; 6
3	(Republic of Ireland) (Switzerland)	Bernadette Davy / Helen Lennon; Anne-Marie Rüegg / Monica Simmen	8; 10	3; 6

==== Netherlands vs. Mexico ====
Netherlands
3
Kooyong Lawn Tennis Club, Melbourne, Australia
November 1978
Grass (outdoor)

Mexico
0

			1	2	3
1	(Netherlands) (Mexico)	Elly Appel; Alina Baraldi	6; 1	6; 3
2	(Netherlands) (Mexico)	Betty Stöve; Alejandra Vallejo	6; 2	6; 3
3	(Netherlands) (Mexico)	Betty Stöve / Tine Zwaan; Alina Baraldi / Alejandra Vallejo	6; 1	6; 2

==== Chile vs. Uruguay ====
Chile
3
Kooyong Lawn Tennis Club, Melbourne, Australia
November 1978
Grass (outdoor)

Uruguay
0

			1	2	3
1	(Chile) (Uruguay)	Silvana Urroz; Lucia Bruce	6; 4	6; 2
2	(Chile) (Uruguay)	Leyla Musalem; Carla Guarino de Galeazzi	6; 1	6; 3
3	(Chile) (Uruguay)	Leyla Musalem / Silvana Urroz; Carla Guarino de Galeazzi / María Julia Roverano	6; 1	6; 2

==== Israel vs. Japan ====
Israel
0
Kooyong Lawn Tennis Club, Melbourne, Australia
November 1978
Grass (outdoor)

Japan
3

			1	2	3
1	(Israel) (Japan)	Hagit Zubary; Kiyoko Nomura	4; 6	3; 6
2	(Israel) (Japan)	Paulina Peled; Naoko Sato	1; 6	4; 6
3	(Israel) (Japan)	Paulina Peled / Hagit Zubary; Kiyoko Nomura / Naoko Sato	6; 3	2; 6	4; 6

==== Belgium vs. Australia ====
Belgium
0
Kooyong Lawn Tennis Club, Melbourne, Australia
November 1978
Grass (outdoor)

Australia
3

			1	2	3
1	(Belgium) (Australia)	Monique Van Haver; Dianne Fromholtz	0; 6	0; 6
2	(Belgium) (Australia)	Michele Gurdal; Wendy Turnbull	1; 6	1; 6
3	(Belgium) (Australia)	Michele Gurdal / Monique Van Haver; Kerry Reid / Wendy Turnbull	2; 6	6; 8

=== Second round ===
==== United States vs. New Zealand ====
United States
3
Kooyong Lawn Tennis Club, Melbourne, Australia
November 1978
Grass (outdoor)

New Zealand
0

			1	2	3
1	(United States) (New Zealand)	Tracy Austin; Brenda Perry	6; 1	6; 2
2	(United States) (New Zealand)	Chris Evert; Judy Chaloner	6; 1	6; 1
3	(United States) (New Zealand)	Chris Evert / Billie Jean King; Judy Chaloner / Chris Newton	6; 1	6; 1

==== Argentina vs. France ====
Argentina
0
Kooyong Lawn Tennis Club, Melbourne, Australia
November 1978
Grass (outdoor)

France
3

			1	2	3
1	(Argentina) (France)	Raquel Giscafré; Gail Benedetti	1; 6	3; 6
2	(Argentina) (France)	Ivanna Madruga-Osses; Françoise Dürr	4; 6	2; 6
3	(Argentina) (France)	Claudia Casabianca / Raquel Giscafré; Brigitte Simon / Frédérique Thibault	4; 6	6; 3	2; 6

==== Czechoslovakia vs. Indonesia ====
Czechoslovakia
3
Kooyong Lawn Tennis Club, Melbourne, Australia
November 1978
Grass (outdoor)

Indonesia
0

			1	2	3
1	(Czechoslovakia) (Indonesia)	Renáta Tomanová; Lita Sugiarto	6; 3	9; 7
2	(Czechoslovakia) (Indonesia)	Regina Maršíková; Yolanda Soemarno	6; 2	6; 1
3	(Czechoslovakia) (Indonesia)	Hana Mandlíková / Hana Strachoňová; Lita Sugiarto / Yolanda Soemarno	7; 5	6; 1

==== West Germany vs. Great Britain ====
West Germany
1
Kooyong Lawn Tennis Club, Melbourne, Australia
November 1978
Grass (outdoor)

Great Britain
2

			1	2	3
1	(West Germany) (United Kingdom)	Sylvia Hanika; Sue Barker	6; 3	6; 2
2	(West Germany) (United Kingdom)	Heidi Eisterlehner; Virginia Wade	0; 6	3; 6
3	(West Germany) (United Kingdom)	Katja Ebbinghaus / Sylvia Hanika; Sue Barker / Virginia Wade	3; 6	0; 6

==== Soviet Union vs. Yugoslavia ====
Soviet Union
3
Kooyong Lawn Tennis Club, Melbourne, Australia
November 1978
Grass (outdoor)

Yugoslavia
0

			1	2	3
1	(Soviet Union) (Socialist Federal Republic of Yugoslavia)	Natasha Chmyreva; Nenni Delmestre	6; 1	6; 0
2	(Soviet Union) (Socialist Federal Republic of Yugoslavia)	Olga Morozova; Mima Jaušovec	6; 1	6; 0
3	(Soviet Union) (Socialist Federal Republic of Yugoslavia)	Natasha Chmyreva / Elena Eliseenko; Nenni Delmestre / Mima Jaušovec	6; 2	6; 3

==== Romania vs. Switzerland ====
Romania
2
Kooyong Lawn Tennis Club, Melbourne, Australia
November 1978
Grass (outdoor)

Switzerland
1

			1	2	3
1	(Romania) (Switzerland)	Florența Mihai; Petra Delhees	1; 6	4; 6
2	(Romania) (Switzerland)	Virginia Ruzici; Anne-Marie Rüegg	6; 3	11; 9
3	(Romania) (Switzerland)	Virginia Ruzici / Mariana Simionescu; Petra Delhees / Monica Simmen	8; 6	6; 2

==== Netherlands vs. Chile ====
Netherlands
3
Kooyong Lawn Tennis Club, Melbourne, Australia
November 1978
Grass (outdoor)

Chile
0

			1	2	3
1	(Netherlands) (Chile)	Elly Appel; Silvana Urroz	6; 0	6; 4
2	(Netherlands) (Chile)	Betty Stöve; Leyla Musalem	6; 4	6; 4
3	(Netherlands) (Chile)	Betty Stöve / Tine Zwaan; Leyla Musalem / Silvana Urroz	6; 1	6; 1

==== Japan vs. Australia ====
Japan
0
Kooyong Lawn Tennis Club, Melbourne, Australia
November 1978
Grass (outdoor)

Australia
3

			1	2	3
1	(Japan) (Australia)	Kiyoko Nomura; Dianne Fromholtz	2; 6	3; 6
2	(Japan) (Australia)	Naoko Sato; Kerry Reid	2; 6	3; 6
3	(Japan) (Australia)	Kiyoko Nomura / Naoko Sato; Kerry Reid / Wendy Turnbull	2; 6	4; 6

=== Quarterfinals ===
==== United States vs. France ====
United States
3
Kooyong Lawn Tennis Club, Melbourne, Australia
December 1978
Grass (outdoor)

France
0

			1	2	3
1	(United States) (France)	Tracy Austin; Frédérique Thibault	6; 4	6; 3
2	(United States) (France)	Chris Evert; Brigitte Simon	6; 2	6; 2
3	(United States) (France)	Chris Evert / Billie Jean King; Françoise Dürr / Gail Benedetti	5; 7	6; 3	6; 2

==== Czechoslovakia vs. Great Britain ====
Czechoslovakia
1
Kooyong Lawn Tennis Club, Melbourne, Australia
December 1978
Grass (outdoor)

Great Britain
2

			1	2	3
1	(Czechoslovakia) (United Kingdom)	Regina Maršíková; Michelle Tyler	7; 9	6; 2	3; 6
2	(Czechoslovakia) (United Kingdom)	Renáta Tomanová; Virginia Wade	4; 6	6; 3	6; 4
3	(Czechoslovakia) (United Kingdom)	Hana Mandlíková / Renáta Tomanová; Sue Barker / Virginia Wade	6; 8	5; 7

==== Soviet Union vs. Romania ====
Soviet Union
3
Kooyong Lawn Tennis Club, Melbourne, Australia
December 1978
Grass (outdoor)

Romania
0

			1	2	3
1	(Soviet Union) (Romania)	Natasha Chmyreva; Florența Mihai	8; 6	6; 4
2	(Soviet Union) (Romania)	Olga Morozova; Virginia Ruzici	6; 4	4; 3		retired
3	(Soviet Union) (Romania)	Natasha Chmyreva / Elena Eliseenko; Lucia Romanov / Mariana Simionescu	6; 1	6; 4

==== Netherlands vs. Australia ====
Netherlands
0
Kooyong Lawn Tennis Club, Melbourne, Australia
December 1978
Grass (outdoor)

Australia
3

			1	2	3
1	(Netherlands) (Australia)	Elly Appel; Kerry Reid	1; 6	1; 6
2	(Netherlands) (Australia)	Betty Stöve; Wendy Turnbull	2; 6	3; 6
3	(Netherlands) (Australia)	Betty Stöve / Tine Zwaan; Kerry Reid / Wendy Turnbull	2; 6	4; 6

=== Semifinals ===
==== United States vs. Great Britain ====
United States
3
Kooyong Lawn Tennis Club, Melbourne, Australia
December 1978
Grass (outdoor)

Great Britain
0

			1	2	3
1	(United States) (United Kingdom)	Tracy Austin; Michelle Tyler	6; 1	6; 1
2	(United States) (United Kingdom)	Chris Evert; Virginia Wade	6; 2	6; 4
3	(United States) (United Kingdom)	Rosemary Casals / Billie Jean King; Sue Barker / Anne Hobbs	1; 6	6; 3	6; 4

==== Soviet Union vs. Australia ====
Soviet Union
1
Kooyong Lawn Tennis Club, Melbourne, Australia
December 1978
Grass (outdoor)

Australia
2

			1	2	3
1	(Soviet Union) (Australia)	Natasha Chmyreva; Kerry Reid	5; 7	4; 6
2	(Soviet Union) (Australia)	Olga Morozova; Wendy Turnbull	6; 1	8; 6
3	(Soviet Union) (Australia)	Natasha Chmyreva / Olga Morozova; Kerry Reid / Wendy Turnbull	4; 6	2; 6

=== Final ===
==== United States vs. Australia ====
United States
2
Kooyong Lawn Tennis Club, Melbourne, Australia
3 December 1978
Grass (outdoor)

Australia
1

			1	2	3
1	(United States) (Australia)	Tracy Austin; Kerry Reid	3; 6	3; 6
2	(United States) (Australia)	Chris Evert; Wendy Turnbull	3; 6	6; 1	6; 1
3	(United States) (Australia)	Chris Evert / Billie Jean King; Kerry Reid / Wendy Turnbull	4; 6	6; 1	6; 4

1978 Federation Cup Champions
(United States)
United States
Seventh title
