= 2000 Fed Cup World Group knockout stage =

The knockout stage of the 2000 World Group was the final stage of the World Group. The winners of each World Group pool joined last year's defending champion in a two-round knockout stage.

Placing	Pool A	Pool B	Pool C
1	Spain	Czech Republic	Belgium
2	Italy	Switzerland	France
3	Germany	Austria	Russia
4	Croatia	Slovakia	Australia

== Draw ==
Semifinals; 21–22 November
1	United States	2
Belgium	1
Czech Republic	1
2	Spain	2

Final; 24–25 November
1	United States	5
2	Spain	0

=== Semifinals ===
==== United States vs. Belgium ====
United States
2
Mandalay Bay Events Center, Las Vegas, NV, United States
22 November 2000
Supreme carpet (indoors)

Belgium
1

			1	2	3
1	(United States) (Belgium)	Monica Seles; Justine Henin	7^{7} 6^{1}	6; 2
2	(United States) (Belgium)	Lindsay Davenport; Kim Clijsters	7^{7} 6^{4}	4; 6	6; 3
3	(United States) (Belgium)	Jennifer Capriati / Lisa Raymond; Els Callens / Dominique Van Roost	3; 6	5; 7

==== Czech Republic vs. Spain ====
Czech Republic
1
Mandalay Bay Events Center, Las Vegas, NV, United States
21 November 2000
Supreme carpet (indoors)

Spain
2

			1	2	3
1	(Czech Republic) (Spain)	Dája Bedáňová; Arantxa Sánchez Vicario	7; 5	4; 6	3; 6
2	(Czech Republic) (Spain)	Květa Hrdličková; Conchita Martínez	6^{3} 7^{7}	7^{7} 6^{2}	4; 6
3	(Czech Republic) (Spain)	Dája Bedáňová / Květa Hrdličková; Virginia Ruano Pascual / Magüi Serna	1; 6	6; 3	7^{7} 6^{5}

=== Final ===
==== United States vs. Spain ====
United States
5
Mandalay Bay Events Center, Las Vegas, NV, United States
24–25 November 2000
Supreme carpet (indoors)

Spain
0

			1	2	3
1	(United States) (Spain)	Monica Seles; Conchita Martínez	6; 2	6; 3
2	(United States) (Spain)	Lindsay Davenport; Arantxa Sánchez Vicario	6; 2	1; 6	6; 3
3	(United States) (Spain)	Lindsay Davenport; Conchita Martínez	6; 1	6; 2
4	(United States) (Spain)	Jennifer Capriati; Arantxa Sánchez Vicario	6; 1	1; 0		retired
5	(United States) (Spain)	Jennifer Capriati / Lisa Raymond; Virginia Ruano Pascual / Magüi Serna	4; 6	6; 4	6; 2

2000 Fed Cup Champions
(United States)
United States
Seventeenth title

== See also ==
- Fed Cup structure
