= 2002 Fed Cup World Group =

Part of tennis tournament

- Date: 27 April – 3 November
- Edition: 12th

Champions
- Slovakia
- Fed Cup

The World Group was the highest level of Fed Cup competition in 2002. Sixteen nations competed in a four-round knockout competition. Belgium was the defending champion, but they were defeated in the quarterfinals by Italy. Slovakia defeated Italy, and then Spain in the final to claim their first Fed Cup title and the No. 1 team ranking.

== Participating teams ==
Participating teams
Argentina	Australia	Austria	Belgium
Croatia	Czech Republic	France	Germany
Hungary	Italy	Russia	Slovakia
Spain	Sweden	Switzerland	United States

== Draw ==
First round 27–28 April
Brussels, Belgium (Indoor clay)
1	Belgium	3
Australia	1
Milan, Italy (Outdoor clay)
Sweden	0
6	Italy	5
Bratislava, Slovakia (Outdoor clay)
7	Slovakia	3
Switzerland	2
Buenos Aires, Argentina (Outdoor clay)
Argentina	2
4	France	3
Charlotte, NC, United States (Outdoor clay)
3	United States	2
Austria	3
Bol, Croatia (Outdoor clay)
Croatia	3
8	Czech Republic	2
Almería, Spain (Outdoor clay)
5	Spain	4
Hungary	1
Dresden, Germany (Outdoor clay)
Germany	3
2	Russia	2

Quarterfinals; 20–21 July
Bologna, Italy (Outdoor clay)
1	Belgium	1
6	Italy	4
Bratislava, Slovakia (Indoor carpet)
7	Slovakia	4
4	France	1
Pörtschach, Austria (Outdoor clay)
Austria	4
Croatia	1
Capdepera, Spain (Outdoor clay)
5	Spain	5
Germany	0

Semifinals; 30–31 October
Gran Canaria, Spain (Indoor hard)
6	Italy	1
7	Slovakia	3
Gran Canaria, Spain (Indoor hard)
Austria	2
5	Spain	3

Final; 2–3 November
Gran Canaria, Spain (Indoor hard)
7	Slovakia	3
5	Spain	1

== First round ==
=== Belgium vs. Australia ===
Belgium
3
Royal Léopold Club, Brussels, Belgium
27–28 April 2002
Red clay (indoors)

Australia
1

			1	2	3
1	(Belgium) (Australia)	Justine Henin; Nicole Pratt	6; 4	4; 6	6; 0
2	(Belgium) (Australia)	Kim Clijsters; Alicia Molik	6; 0	6; 2
3	(Belgium) (Australia)	Els Callens; Nicole Pratt	2; 6	4; 6
4	(Belgium) (Australia)	Justine Henin; Alicia Molik	6; 2	6; 1
5	(Belgium) (Australia)	Els Callens / Laurence Courtois; Nicole Pratt / Rennae Stubbs	6^{2} 7^{7}			not completed

=== Sweden vs. Italy ===
Sweden
0
Tennis Club Milano, Milan, Italy
27–28 April 2002
Red clay (outdoors)

Italy
5

			1	2	3
1	(Sweden) (Italy)	Åsa Svensson; Antonella Serra Zanetti	7^{7} 6^{4}	3; 6	8; 10
2	(Sweden) (Italy)	Sofia Arvidsson; Adriana Serra Zanetti	1; 6	1; 6
3	(Sweden) (Italy)	Åsa Svensson; Adriana Serra Zanetti	3; 6	6^{5} 7^{7}
4	(Sweden) (Italy)	Sofia Arvidsson; Roberta Vinci	3; 6	2; 6
5	(Sweden) (Italy)	Sofia Arvidsson / Maria Wolfbrandt; Maria Elena Camerin / Roberta Vinci	6; 1	0; 6	4; 6

=== Slovakia vs. Switzerland ===
Slovakia
3
NTC Stadium, Bratislava, Slovakia
27–28 April 2002
Red clay (outdoors)

Switzerland
2

			1	2	3
1	(Slovakia) (Switzerland)	Janette Husárová; Patty Schnyder	7^{9} 6^{7}	5; 7	7; 5
2	(Slovakia) (Switzerland)	Daniela Hantuchová; Myriam Casanova	6; 4	7; 5
3	(Slovakia) (Switzerland)	Daniela Hantuchová; Patty Schnyder	3; 6	3; 6
4	(Slovakia) (Switzerland)	Henrieta Nagyová; Myriam Casanova	6; 3	3; 6	1; 6
5	(Slovakia) (Switzerland)	Daniela Hantuchová / Janette Husárová; Myriam Casanova / Patty Schnyder	6; 0	6^{4} 7^{7}	6; 3

=== Argentina vs. France ===
Argentina
2
Buenos Aires LTC, Buenos Aires, Argentina
27–28 April 2002
Red clay (outdoors)

France
3

			1	2	3
1	(Argentina) (France)	Mariana Díaz Oliva; Amélie Mauresmo	5; 7	2; 6
2	(Argentina) (France)	Paola Suárez; Sandrine Testud	7; 5	6; 4
3	(Argentina) (France)	Paola Suárez; Amélie Mauresmo	4; 6	3; 6
4	(Argentina) (France)	Mariana Díaz Oliva; Nathalie Dechy	2; 6	3; 6
5	(Argentina) (France)	Clarisa Fernández / María Emilia Salerni; Nathalie Dechy / Émilie Loit	6; 3	2; 6	6; 2

=== United States vs. Austria ===
United States
2
Olde Providence Racquet Club, Charlotte, NC, United States
28–29 April 2002
Har-Tru clay (outdoors)

Austria
3

			1	2	3
1	(United States) (Austria)	Monica Seles; Barbara Schwartz	6^{7} 7^{9}	2; 6
2	(United States) (Austria)	Jennifer Capriati; Evelyn Fauth				w/o
3	(United States) (Austria)	Meghann Shaughnessy; Barbara Schwartz	6; 4	6^{7} 7^{9}	7; 9
4	(United States) (Austria)	Monica Seles; Evelyn Fauth	6; 3	6; 3
5	(United States) (Austria)	Lisa Raymond / Monica Seles; Evelyn Fauth / Marion Maruska	6; 1	7^{7} 6^{4}

=== Croatia vs. Czech Republic ===
Croatia
3
Tennis Center Zlatni Rat, Bol, Croatia
28–29 April 2002
Red clay (outdoors)

Czech Republic
2

			1	2	3
1	(Croatia) (Czech Republic)	Jelena Kostanić; Sandra Kleinová	7^{7} 6^{1}	6; 4
2	(Croatia) (Czech Republic)	Iva Majoli; Iveta Benešová	4; 6	1; 6
3	(Croatia) (Czech Republic)	Iva Majoli; Klára Koukalová	4; 6	1; 6
4	(Croatia) (Czech Republic)	Jelena Kostanić; Iveta Benešová	6; 2	7; 5
5	(Croatia) (Czech Republic)	Jelena Kostanić / Iva Majoli; Iveta Benešová / Eva Birnerová	6; 1	6; 2

=== Spain vs. Hungary ===
Spain
4
Club de Tenis Almería, Almería, Spain
28–29 April 2002
Red clay (outdoors)

Hungary
1

			1	2	3
1	(Spain) (Hungary)	Ángeles Montolio; Zsófia Gubacsi	3; 6	6; 3	2; 6
2	(Spain) (Hungary)	Arantxa Sánchez Vicario; Rita Kuti-Kis	6; 4	6; 2
3	(Spain) (Hungary)	Arantxa Sánchez Vicario; Zsófia Gubacsi	6; 0	6; 2
4	(Spain) (Hungary)	Magüi Serna; Rita Kuti-Kis	6; 3	6; 1
5	(Spain) (Hungary)	Virginia Ruano Pascual / Arantxa Sánchez Vicario; Zsófia Gubacsi / Anikó Kapros	7; 5	6; 2

=== Germany vs. Russia ===
Germany
3
Tennis Center Blau-Weiss Blasewitz, Dresden, Germany
28–29 April 2002
Red clay (outdoors)

Russia
2

			1	2	3
1	(Germany) (Russia)	Martina Müller; Elena Dementieva	4; 6	2; 6
2	(Germany) (Russia)	Barbara Rittner; Anastasia Myskina	7; 5	3; 6	7; 5
3	(Germany) (Russia)	Barbara Rittner; Elena Dementieva	6; 3	6; 1
4	(Germany) (Russia)	Martina Müller; Anastasia Myskina	6^{5} 7^{7}	7^{7} 6^{4}	9; 11
5	(Germany) (Russia)	Barbara Rittner / Marlene Weingärtner; Elena Dementieva / Elena Likhovtseva	7^{7} 6^{1}	6; 2

== Quarterfinals ==
=== Belgium vs. Italy ===
Belgium
1
Circolo Tennis Bologna, Bologna, Italy
20–21 July 2002
Red clay (outdoors)

Italy
4

			1	2	3
1	(Belgium) (Italy)	Els Callens; Rita Grande	6; 2	6; 1
2	(Belgium) (Italy)	Caroline Maes; Silvia Farina Elia	2; 6	1; 6
3	(Belgium) (Italy)	Els Callens; Silvia Farina Elia	2; 6	6^{4} 7^{7}
4	(Belgium) (Italy)	Caroline Maes; Rita Grande	4; 6	6^{5} 7^{7}
5	(Belgium) (Italy)	Elke Clijsters / Laurence Courtois; Adriana Serra Zanetti / Roberta Vinci	5; 7	4; 6

=== Slovakia vs. France ===
Slovakia
4
Incheba Hall, Bratislava, Slovakia
20–21 July 2002
Taraflex (indoors)

France
1

			1	2	3
1	(Slovakia) (France)	Daniela Hantuchová; Nathalie Dechy	7; 5	7; 5
2	(Slovakia) (France)	Janette Husárová; Amélie Mauresmo	2; 6	6; 4	2; 6
3	(Slovakia) (France)	Daniela Hantuchová; Amélie Mauresmo	2; 6	6; 4	6; 3
4	(Slovakia) (France)	Martina Suchá; Nathalie Dechy	7^{7} 6^{3}	6; 1
5	(Slovakia) (France)	Janette Husárová / Henrieta Nagyová; Nathalie Dechy / Stéphanie Foretz Gacon	7; 5	6; 0

=== Austria vs. Croatia ===
Austria
4
Pörtschach Werzer Arena, Pörtschach, Austria
20–21 July 2002
Taraflex (indoors)

Croatia
1

			1	2	3
1	(Austria) (Croatia)	Barbara Schwartz; Iva Majoli	6; 2	6; 3
2	(Austria) (Croatia)	Barbara Schett; Jelena Kostanić	6; 2	6; 1
3	(Austria) (Croatia)	Barbara Schett; Iva Majoli	4; 6	3; 6
4	(Austria) (Croatia)	Barbara Schwartz; Jelena Kostanić	4; 6	6; 3	8; 6
5	(Austria) (Croatia)	Barbara Schett / Patricia Wartusch; Karolina Šprem / Silvija Talaja	6; 2	6; 1

=== Spain vs. Germany ===
Spain
5
CT. Es Coll d'Os, Mallorca, Spain
20–21 July 2002
Red clay (outdoors)

Germany
0

			1	2	3
1	(Spain) (Germany)	Arantxa Sánchez Vicario; Barbara Rittner	2; 6	7^{7} 6^{4}	6; 3
2	(Spain) (Germany)	Marta Marrero; Martina Müller	6; 1	6; 1
3	(Spain) (Germany)	Arantxa Sánchez Vicario; Martina Müller	3; 6	6; 2	6; 3
4	(Spain) (Germany)	Marta Marrero; Anca Barna	7^{7} 6^{2}	2; 6	6; 2
5	(Spain) (Germany)	Virginia Ruano Pascual / Magüi Serna; Bianka Lamade / Barbara Rittner	6; 3	6; 3

== Semifinals ==
=== Italy vs. Slovakia ===
Italy
1
Palacio de Congresos de Maspalomas, Gran Canaria, Spain
30–31 October 2002
Greenset hard (indoors)

Slovakia
3

			1	2	3
1	(Italy) (Slovakia)	Francesca Schiavone; Daniela Hantuchová	7^{7} 6^{1}	6; 1
2	(Italy) (Slovakia)	Silvia Farina Elia; Janette Husárová	4; 6	3; 6
3	(Italy) (Slovakia)	Silvia Farina Elia; Daniela Hantuchová	5; 7	3; 6
4	(Italy) (Slovakia)	Francesca Schiavone; Janette Husárová	4; 6	4; 6
5	(Italy) (Slovakia)	Silvia Farina Elia / Roberta Vinci; Daniela Hantuchová / Janette Husárová				not played

=== Austria vs. Spain ===
Austria
2
Palacio de Congresos de Maspalomas, Gran Canaria, Spain
30–31 October 2002
Greenset hard (indoors)

Spain
3

			1	2	3
1	(Austria) (Spain)	Patricia Wartusch; Conchita Martínez	5; 7	0; 6
2	(Austria) (Spain)	Barbara Schett; Arantxa Sánchez Vicario	3; 6	6^{5} 7^{7}
3	(Austria) (Spain)	Barbara Schett; Conchita Martínez	7; 5	6^{3} 7^{7}	6; 2
4	(Austria) (Spain)	Patricia Wartusch; Arantxa Sánchez Vicario	4; 6	6; 4	9; 7
5	(Austria) (Spain)	Barbara Schett / Patricia Wartusch; Conchita Martínez / Virginia Ruano Pascual	6; 4	3; 6	1; 6

== Final ==
=== Slovakia vs. Spain ===
Slovakia
3
Palacio de Congresos de Maspalomas, Gran Canaria, Spain
2–3 November 2002
Greenset hard (indoors)

Spain
1

			1	2	3
1	(Slovakia) (Spain)	Janette Husárová; Conchita Martínez	4; 6	6^{6} 7^{8}
2	(Slovakia) (Spain)	Daniela Hantuchová; Magüi Serna	6; 2	6; 1
3	(Slovakia) (Spain)	Daniela Hantuchová; Conchita Martínez	6^{8} 7^{10}	7; 5	6; 4
4	(Slovakia) (Spain)	Janette Husárová; Arantxa Sánchez Vicario	6; 0	6; 2
5	(Slovakia) (Spain)	Daniela Hantuchová / Janette Husárová; Virginia Ruano Pascual / Magüi Serna				not played

2002 Fed Cup champions

Slovakia
First title

== See also ==
- Fed Cup structure
