= Delia Sescioreanu =

Romanian tennis player

- Full name: Delia Sescioreanu Mask
- Country (sports): Romania
- Residence: Timișoara, Romania
- Born: 16 March 1986 (age 39); Jimbolia, Romania
- Height: 1.70 m (5 ft 7 in)
- Turned pro: 2000
- Retired: 2015
- Plays: Right-handed (two-handed backhand)
- Prize money: $65,912

Singles
- Career record: 103–62
- Career titles: 5 ITF
- Highest ranking: No. 145 (11 October 2004)

Grand Slam singles results
- Australian Open: Q1 (2005)
- French Open: Q1 (2005)
- Wimbledon: Q1 (2005)
- US Open: Q3 (2004)

Doubles
- Career record: 28–30
- Career titles: 2 ITF
- Highest ranking: No. 235 (5 April 2004)

Delia Sescioreanu Mask (born 16 March 1986) is a Romanian former tennis player.

Sescioreanu won five singles titles and two doubles titles on the ITF Women's Circuit in her career. On 11 October 2004, she reached her best singles ranking of world No. 145. On 5 April 2004, she peaked at No. 235 in the doubles rankings.

== Career ==
=== 2004 ===
Sescioreanu then won three qualifying matches to advance to the main draw in Palermo. She played Italian Rita Grande in the first round, defeating the former world No. 24 in straight sets. In round two, she lost to Katarina Srebotnik.

=== 2005 ===
Sescioreanu made her WTA Tour main-draw debut at the 2005 Hyderabad Open. She lost in the first round to Indian player Sania Mirza.

== ITF finals ==
=== Singles (5–2) ===
Legend $50,000 tournaments $10,000 tournaments	Finals by surface Hard (0–0) Clay (5–2)

Outcome	No.	Date	Location	Surface	Opponent	Score
Winner	1.	12 May 2002	Zaton, Croatia	Clay	(Russia) Nina Bratchikova	6–4, 6–4
Winner	2.	5 August 2002	Gdynia, Poland	Clay	(Poland) Marta Domachowska	7–6^{(9)}, 6–1
Winner	3.	26 August 2002	Bucharest, Romania	Clay	(Ukraine) Olena Antypina	6–1, 6–4
Winner	4.	29 September 2002	Trenčianske Teplice, Slovakia	Clay	(Czech Republic) Hana Šromová	7–5, 4–2 ret.
Winner	5.	10 March 2003	Makarska, Croatia	Clay	(Croatia) Sanda Mamić	6–4, 6–2
Runner-up	1.	24 March 2003	Rome, Italy	Clay	(Slovakia) Zuzana Kučová	3–6, 7–6^{(5)}, 0–6
Runner-up	2.	7 September 2004	Fano, Italy	Clay	(Serbia) Ana Ivanovic	2–6, 4–6

=== Doubles (2–3) ===
Legend $50,000 tournaments $25,000 tournaments $10,000 tournaments	Finals by surface Hard (0–0) Clay (2–3)

Outcome	No.	Date	Location	Surface	Partner	Opponents	Score
Runner-up	1.	23 July 2002	Horb am Neckar, Germany	Clay	(Romania) Ruxandra Marin	(Russia) Svetlana Mossiakova (Armenia) Liudmila Nikoyan	6–7^{(4)}, 1–6
Runner-up	2.	10 November 2002	Le Havre, France	Clay (i)	(Federal Republic of Yugoslavia) Dragana Ilić	(Austria) Bianca Kamper (Austria) Nicole Remis	2–6, 2–6
Runner-up	3.	27 April 2003	Taranto, Italy	Clay	(Austria) Nicole Remis	(South Africa) Natalie Grandin (South Africa) Kim Grant	2–6, 1–6
Winner	1.	3 May 2003	Maglie, Italy	Clay	(Romania) Edina Gallovits-Hall	(Spain) Nuria Llagostera Vives (Spain) María José Martínez Sánchez	6–4, 4–6, 6–3
Winner	2.	6 September 2004	Fano, Italy	Clay	(Romania) Andreea Ehritt-Vanc	(Bosnia and Herzegovina) Mervana Jugić-Salkić (Croatia) Darija Jurak	7–5, 1–6, 6–2
