= Daniela Casanova =

Swiss tennis player

- Country (sports): Switzerland
- Residence: Altstätten, Switzerland
- Born: 14 May 1984 (age 40); Altstätten
- Turned pro: 1999
- Retired: 2003
- Plays: Right-handed (two-handed backhand)
- Prize money: $16,043

Singles
- Career record: 39–27
- Career titles: 0 WTA, 2 ITF
- Highest ranking: No. 456 (8 July 2002)

Grand Slam singles results
- Australian Open Junior: 3R (2002)
- Wimbledon Junior: QF (2001)
- US Open Junior: 2R (2001)

Doubles
- Career record: 25–9
- Career titles: 4 ITF
- Highest ranking: No. 402 (17 June 2002)

Grand Slam doubles results
- Australian Open Junior: 2R (2001)
- Wimbledon Junior: 2R (2002)

Team competitions
- Fed Cup: 0–2

Daniela Casanova (born 14 May 1984) is a former tennis player from Switzerland.

She achieved career-high WTA rankings of 456 in singles on 8 July 2002 and 402 in doubles on 17 June 2002. She won two singles titles and four doubles titles on the ITF Women's Circuit.

Playing for Switzerland in Fed Cup, Casanova has a win-loss record of 0–2. She retired from tennis in 2003.

== Personal life ==
Casanova was born in Altstätten. She started playing tennis at the age of five. She was coached by her father, Leo Casanova, and Zoltan Kuharszky, and received advice from Melanie Molitor. She preferred hard courts and any fast surface. Her mother's name is Luzia. She has a brother, Sandro, and a younger sister, Myriam, who also has been a professional player.

== ITF finals ==
$100,000 tournaments
$75,000 tournaments
$50,000 tournaments
$25,000 tournaments
$10,000 tournaments

=== Singles: 5 (2–3) ===
Result	No.	Date	Location	Surface	Opponent	Score
Win	1.	10 September 2000	Zadar, Croatia	Clay	(Slovakia) Zuzana Kučová	6–4, 6–1
Win	2.	17 September 2000	Biograd, Croatia	Clay	(Croatia) Marijana Kovačević	1–6, 6–1, 6–4
Loss	1.	23 September 2001	Zadar, Croatia	Clay	(Czech Republic) Pavlína Šlitrová	6–3, 5–7, 4–6
Loss	2.	7 October 2001	Novi Sad, Serbia	Clay	(Switzerland) Myriam Casanova	4–6, 5–7
Loss	3.	12 May 2002	Szeged, Hungary	Clay	(Romania) Edina Gallovits-Hall	4–6, 5–7

=== Doubles: 6 (4–2) ===
Result	No.	Date	Tournament	Surface	Partner	Opponents	Score
Loss	1.	17 June 2001	Vaduz, Liechtenstein	Clay	(Switzerland) Myriam Casanova	(Germany) Susi Bensch (Germany) Sabrina Jolk	6–7^{(5–7)}, 5–7
Win	1.	23 September 2001	Zadar, Croatia	Clay	(Switzerland) Myriam Casanova	(Czech Republic) Barbora Machovská (Czech Republic) Sarka Snorova	6–2, 6–2
Win	2.	30 September 2001	Belgrade, Serbia	Clay	(Switzerland) Myriam Casanova	(Federal Republic of Yugoslavia) Dragana Ilić (Federal Republic of Yugoslavia) Ljiljana Nanušević	6–2, 7–5
Win	3.	7 October 2001	Novi Sad, Serbia	Clay	(Switzerland) Myriam Casanova	(Federal Republic of Yugoslavia) Ana Četnik (Federal Republic of Yugoslavia) Ljiljana Nanušević	6–1, 6–1
Loss	2.	14 April 2002	Makarska, Croatia	Clay	(Croatia) Marijana Kovačević	(Czech Republic) Petra Cetkovská (Slovenia) Tina Hergold	5–7, 2–6
Win	4.	11 May 2002	Szeged, Hungary	Clay	(Switzerland) Aliénor Tricerri	(Hungary) Zsuzsanna Fodor (Hungary) Dorottya Magas	7–5, 7–6

== Fed Cup participation ==
=== Singles ===
Edition	Round	Date	Location	Against	Surface	Opponent	W/L	Score
2001 Fed Cup	World Group Playoffs	22 July 2001	Sydney, Australia	Australia	Grass	(Australia) Alicia Molik	L	3–6, 1–6

=== Doubles ===
Edition	Round	Date	Location	Against	Surface	Partner	Opponents	W/L	Score
2001 Fed Cup	World Group Playoffs	22 July 2001	Sydney, Australia	Australia	Grass	(Switzerland) Aliénor Tricerri	(Australia) Evie Dominikovic (Australia) Rachel McQuillan	L	3–6, 3–6
