= 2001 Fed Cup World Group – Pool A =

Group A of the 2001 Fed Cup World Group was one of two pools in the World Group of the 2001 Fed Cup. Four teams competed in a round robin competition, with the top team advancing to the final.

	(Russia) RUS	(France) FRA	(Argentina) ARG	(Czech Republic) CZE	RR; W–L	Set; W–L	Game; W–L	Standings
Russia		2–1	3–0	2–1	3–0	15–7	115–94	1
France	1–2		2–1	3–0	2–1	13–6	106–67	2
Argentina	0–3	1–2		2–1	1–2	8–10	82–107	3
Czech Republic	1–2	0–3	1–2		0–3	5–16	79–114	4

== Russia vs. Czech Republic ==
Russia
2
Parque Ferial Juan Carlos I, Madrid, Spain
7 November 2001
Red clay (indoors)

Czech Republic
1

			1	2	3
1	(Russia) (Czech Republic)	Elena Bovina; Květa Hrdličková	6; 3	1; 6	6; 8
2	(Russia) (Czech Republic)	Elena Dementieva; Denisa Chládková	6; 4	4; 6	6; 1
3	(Russia) (Czech Republic)	Elena Likhovtseva / Nadia Petrova; Květa Hrdličková / Alena Vašková	6; 3	6; 2

== Russia vs. Argentina ==
Russia
3
Parque Ferial Juan Carlos I, Madrid, Spain
8 November 2001
Red clay (indoors)

Argentina
0

			1	2	3
1	(Russia) (Argentina)	Nadia Petrova; Clarisa Fernández	6; 4	6; 3
2	(Russia) (Argentina)	Elena Dementieva; María Emilia Salerni	6; 1	6; 2
3	(Russia) (Argentina)	Elena Bovina / Elena Likhovtseva; Laura Montalvo / María Emilia Salerni	7^{8} 6^{6}	6^{5} 7^{7}	6; 4

== France vs. Czech Republic ==
France
3
Parque Ferial Juan Carlos I, Madrid, Spain
8 November 2001
Red clay (indoors)

Czech Republic
0

			1	2	3
1	(France) (Czech Republic)	Sandrine Testud; Květa Hrdličková	6; 4	6; 1
2	(France) (Czech Republic)	Amélie Mauresmo; Denisa Chládková	6; 2	7; 5
3	(France) (Czech Republic)	Nathalie Tauziat / Sandrine Testud; Petra Cetkovská / Alena Vašková	6; 3	6; 2

== Russia vs. France ==
Russia
2
Parque Ferial Juan Carlos I, Madrid, Spain
9 November 2001
Red clay (indoors)

France
1

			1	2	3
1	(Russia) (France)	Nadia Petrova; Sandrine Testud	6; 4	6; 4
2	(Russia) (France)	Elena Dementieva; Amélie Mauresmo	6; 3	0; 6	6; 4
3	(Russia) (France)	Elena Bovina / Elena Likhovtseva; Virginie Razzano / Nathalie Tauziat	6^{5} 7^{7}	1; 6

== Argentina vs. Czech Republic ==
Argentina
2
Parque Ferial Juan Carlos I, Madrid, Spain
9 November 2001
Red clay (indoors)

Czech Republic
1

			1	2	3
1	(Argentina) (Czech Republic)	Clarisa Fernández; Květa Hrdličková	6; 4	6; 3
2	(Argentina) (Czech Republic)	María Emilia Salerni; Denisa Chládková	6; 4	6; 3
3	(Argentina) (Czech Republic)	Laura Montalvo / María Emilia Salerni; Denisa Chládková / Květa Hrdličková	6; 3	4; 6	2; 6

== France vs. Argentina ==
France
2
Parque Ferial Juan Carlos I, Madrid, Spain
10 November 2001
Red clay (indoors)

Argentina
1

			1	2	3
1	(France) (Argentina)	Sandrine Testud; Clarisa Fernández				w/o
2	(France) (Argentina)	Amélie Mauresmo; María Emilia Salerni	5; 7	6; 1	6; 0
3	(France) (Argentina)	Virginie Razzano / Nathalie Tauziat; Laura Montalvo / María Emilia Salerni	6; 1	6^{3} 7^{7}	6; 3

== See also ==
- Fed Cup structure
