= Dragana Ilić =

Serbian tennis player

- Country (sports): Yugoslavia
- Born: 29 June 1979 (age 47)
- Plays: Right-handed
- Prize money: $16,547

Singles
- Career record: 53–84
- Career titles: 1 ITF
- Highest ranking: No. 451 (10 May 1999)

Doubles
- Career record: 37–49
- Career titles: 1 ITF
- Highest ranking: No. 359 (7 June 1999)

Team competitions
- Fed Cup: 8–2

Dragana Ilić (born 29 June 1979) is a Serbian former professional tennis player.

A right-handed player, Ilić represented Yugoslavia in a total of nine Fed Cup ties across the 1995 and 1997 competitions, mostly as a doubles player.

Ilić, who reached a career-high ranking of 451, featured in the qualifying draw for a WTA Tour tournament in Istanbul in 1998 and the following year won an ITF tournament in Kastoria.

From 2004 to 2006, she played college tennis in the United States for Lynn University.

== ITF Circuit finals ==
=== Singles: 2 (1–1) ===
Outcome	No.	Date	Tournament	Surface	Opponent	Score
Runner-up	1.	28 June 1998	ITF Kavala, Greece	Hard	(Bulgaria) Biljana Pawlowa-Dimitrova	3–6, 6–7
Winner	1.	25 October 1999	ITF Kastoria, Greece	Carpet	(New Zealand) Shelley Stephens	6–4, 6–4

=== Doubles: 7 (1–6) ===
Outcome	No.	Date	Tournament	Surface	Partner	Opponents	Score
Runner-up	1.	31 August 1998	ITF Xanthi, Greece	Hard	(Federal Republic of Yugoslavia) Ljiljana Nanušević	(Greece) Eleni Daniilidou (Greece) Evagelia Roussi	0–6, 3–6
Runner-up	2.	9 May 1999	ITF Verona, Italy	Clay	(Slovenia) Maja Matevžič	(Argentina) Melisa Arévalo (Argentina) Sabrina Valenti	6–7, 6–7
Winner	2.	17 May 1999	ITF Pesaro, Italy	Clay	(Slovenia) Maja Matevžič	(Croatia) Marijana Kovačević (Russia) Ekaterina Sysoeva	6–4, 6–3
Runner-up	3.	20 November 2000	ITF Mallorca, Spain	Clay	(Slovakia) Alena Paulenková	(Argentina) Vanesa Krauth (Argentina) Erica Krauth	0–4, 0–4
Runner-up	4.	22 April 2001	ITF Belgrade, Yugoslavia	Clay	(Federal Republic of Yugoslavia) Ana Timotić	(Austria) Daniela Klemenschits (Austria) Sandra Klemenschits	2–6, 1–6
Runner-up	5.	30 September 2001	ITF Belgrade, Serbia	Clay	(Federal Republic of Yugoslavia) Ljiljana Nanušević	(Switzerland) Myriam Casanova (Switzerland) Daniela Casanova	2–6, 5–7
Runner-up	6.	10 November 2002	ITF Le Havre, France	Clay	(Romania) Delia Sescioreanu	(Austria) Bianca Kamper (Austria) Nicole Remis	2–6, 2–6
