= Aliénor Tricerri =

Swiss tennis player (born 1980)

- Country (sports): Switzerland
- Born: 20 March 1980 (age 45); Geneva, Switzerland
- Height: 1.72 m (5 ft 8 in)
- Retired: 2008
- Prize money: $59,481

Singles
- Career record: 155–160
- Career titles: 4 ITF
- Highest ranking: 286 (20 September 1999)

Doubles
- Career record: 163–107
- Career titles: 21 ITF
- Highest ranking: 203 (18 September 2000)

Team competitions
- Fed Cup: 0–2

Aliénor Tricerri (born 20 March 1980) is a Swiss former tennis player.

Tricerri won four singles titles and 21 doubles titles on the ITF Women's Circuit in her career. On 20 September 1999, she reached her best singles ranking of world number 286. On 18 September 2000, she peaked at number 203 in the doubles rankings.

In July 2001, Tricerri appeared in Switzerland Fed Cup team.

== ITF Circuit finals ==
$100,000 tournaments
$75,000 tournaments
$50,000 tournaments
$25,000 tournaments
$10,000 tournaments

=== Singles (4–8) ===
Result	No.	Date	Tournament	Surface	Opponent	Score
Loss	1.	9 November 1997	Santo Domingo, Dominican Republic	Clay	(Venezuela) Milagros Sequera	2–6, 6–4, 0–6
Loss	2.	9 November 1998	San Salvador, El Salvador	Clay	(Spain) Alicia Ortuño	1–6, 0–6
Loss	3.	23 November 1998	Culiacán, Mexico	Hard	(Hungary) Zsófia Gubacsi	0–6, ret.
Win	1.	2 August 1999	Caracas, Venezuela	Hard	(Slovakia) Gabriela Voleková	6–1, 6–2
Win	2.	16 August 1999	Bucharest, Romania	Clay	(Poland) Sylwia Rynarzewska	6–3, 6–0
Loss	4.	8 November 1999	San Salvador, El Salvador	Clay	(United Kingdom) Joanne Moore	6–4, 4–6, 5–7
Loss	5.	24 April 2000	Cerignola, Italy	Clay	(Romania) Ioana Gașpar	6–4, 3–6, 1–6
Loss	6.	5 June 2000	Antalya, Turkey	Clay	(Sweden) Maria Wolfbrandt	2–6, 0–6
Win	3.	26 June 2000	Istanbul, Turkey	Hard	(Czech Republic) Lucie Steflová	6–4, 7–6
Win	4.	9 October 2000	Cairo, Egypt	Clay	(Austria) Daniela Klemenschits	6–4, 4–2
Loss	7.	8 September 2002	Mollerussa, Spain	Hard	(Portugal) Frederica Piedade	4–6, 2–6
Loss	8.	10 May 2004	Monzón, Spain	Hard	(Spain) Marta Fraga	0–6, 4–6

=== Doubles (21–13) ===
Result	No.	Date	Tournament	Surface	Partner	Opponents	Score
Win	1.	16 September 1996	Bossonnens, Switzerland	Clay	(Madagascar) Natacha Randriantefy	(Hungary) Andrea Noszály (Germany) Fruzsina Siklosi	6–4, 7–5
Loss	1.	7 October 1996	Burgdorf, Switzerland	Carpet (i)	(Madagascar) Natacha Randriantefy	(Slovakia) Patrícia Marková (Czech Republic) Denisa Sobotková	3–6, 4–6
Win	2.	11 November 1996	Le Havre, France	Clay (i)	(France) Caroline Rossel	(France) Sandrine Bouilleau (France) Catherine Valantin	2–6, 7–6^{(7–5)}, 7–5
Loss	2.	17 February 1997	Faro, Portugal	Hard	(France) Sylvie Sallaberry	(Japan) Maiko Inoue (Japan) Riei Kawamata	3–6, 2–6
Win	3.	11 November 1996	Santiago, Chile	Clay	(Czech Republic) Monika Maštalířová	(Argentina) Mariana Lopez Palacios (Argentina) Laura Montalvo	6–4, 6–3
Loss	3.	19 January 1998	Miami, United States	Hard	(Russia) Alina Jidkova	(United States) Lilia Osterloh (Slovakia) Zuzana Valekova	4–6, 4–6
Win	4.	18 May 1998	Zaragoza, Spain	Clay	(Spain) Gisela Riera	(Spain) Lourdes Domínguez Lino (Argentina) Veronica Stele	6–4, 6–1
Win	5.	1 June 1998	Ceuta, Spain	Hard	(Spain) Gisela Riera	(Spain) Tamara Aranda (Spain) Julia Carballal	6–3, 6–3
Win	6.	29 June 1998	Lohja, Finland	Hard	(United Kingdom) Jasmine Choudhury	(Czech Republic) Helena Fremuthova (Russia) Irina Kornienko	6–3, 6–2
Win	7.	21 September 1998	Santiago, Chile	Clay	(Chile) Paula Cabezas	(Argentina) Mariana Lopez Palacios (Chile) María-Alejandra Quezada	6–4, 6–1
Loss	4.	12 October 1998	Asunción, Paraguay	Clay	(Hungary) Zsófia Gubacsi	(Paraguay) Laura Bernal (Paraguay) Larissa Schaerer	6–3, 6–7^{(3–7)}, 4–6
Loss	5.	9 November 1998	San Salvador, El Salvador	Clay	(United States) Susie Starrett	(United Kingdom) Joanne Moore (Spain) Alicia Ortuño	3–6, 6–3, 1–6
Win	8.	16 November 1998	Los Mochis, Mexico	Hard	(Hungary) Zsófia Gubacsi	(Mexico) Melody Falcó (Mexico) Paola Palencia	6–1, 6–2
Loss	6.	23 November 1998	Culiacan, Mexico	Clay	(Hungary) Zsófia Gubacsi	(Canada) Renata Kolbovic (Russia) Alina Jidkova	3–6, 2–6
Loss	7.	1 February 1999	İstanbul, Turkey	Hard (i)	(Belarus) Nadejda Ostrovskaya	(Ukraine) Tatiana Perebiynis (Uzbekistan) Iroda Tulyaganova	3–6, 4–6
Win	9.	3 May 1999	Poza Rica, Mexico	Hard	(Argentina) Paula Racedo	(Australia) Nadia Johnston (Australia) Nicole Sewell	6–1, 7–6^{(7–5)}
Win	10.	21 June 1999	Montreal, Canada	Hard	(Sweden) Kristina Triska	(Japan) Riei Kawamata (Japan) Yoshiko Sasano	5–7, 7–5, 6–2
Loss	8.	2 August 1999	Caracas, Venezuela	Hard	(Slovakia) Gabriela Voleková	(Argentina) Melisa Arévalo (Colombia) Mariana Mesa	5–7, 6–7^{(1–7)}
Win	11.	13 September 1999	Buenos Aires, Argentina	Clay	(Argentina) Paula Racedo	(Argentina) Laura Montalvo (Argentina) Paola Suárez	w/o
Loss	9.	19 September 1999	Asunción, Paraguay	Hard	(Colombia) Mariana Mesa	(Paraguay) Rossana de los Ríos (Paraguay) Larissa Schaerer	2–6, 3–6
Win	12.	4 October 1999	Santiago, Chile	Clay	(Argentina) Natalia Gussoni	(Argentina) Jorgelina Cravero (Argentina) María Emilia Salerni	7–5, 6–4
Win	13.	8 November 1999	San Salvador, El Salvador	Clay	(United Kingdom) Joanne Moore	(Uruguay) Elena Juricich (Venezuela) Stephanie Schaer	7–5, 2–1 ret.
Loss	10.	27 March 2000	Amiens, France	Clay (i)	(Argentina) Mariana Díaz Oliva	(Romania) Magda Mihalache (Slovakia) Zuzana Váleková	2–6, 4–6
Win	14.	17 April 2000	Filothei, Greece	Clay	(Romania) Magda Mihalache	(Hungary) Kinga Berecz (Hungary) Adrienn Hegedűs	6–2, 5–7, 7–5
Win	15.	1 May 2000	Bari, Italy	Clay	(Argentina) Vanesa Krauth	(Argentina) Natalia Gussoni (Argentina) Sabrina Valenti	7–5, 6–4
Loss	11.	21 August 2000	Maribor, Slovenia	Clay	(Argentina) Vanesa Krauth	(Germany) Angelika Rösch (Germany) Jasmin Woehr	4–6, 6–4, 6–7^{(1–7)}
Loss	12.	2 October 2000	Cairo, Egypt	Clay	(Slovakia) Andrea Masarykova	(Austria) Sandra Klemenschits (Austria) Daniela Klemenschits	1–4, 1–4, 2–4
Win	16.	19 February 2001	Algarve, Portugal	Hard	(France) Carine Bornu	(United Kingdom) Alice Barnes (United Kingdom) Julie Pullin	6–3, 6–3
Win	17.	21 May 2001	El Paso, United States	Hard	(United States) Jacqueline Trail	(United States) Annica Cooper (Canada) Alison Nash	6–1, 6–2
Win	18.	1 July 2001	Lachine, Canada	Hard	(United States) Adria Engel	(Japan) Ayano Takeuchi (Japan) Tomoko Yonemura	6–2, 6–1
Win	19.	6 May 2002	Szeged, Hungary	Clay	(Switzerland) Daniela Casanova	(Hungary) Zsuzsanna Fodor (Hungary) Dorottya Magas	7–5, 7–6^{(7–2)}
Loss	13.	29 September 2002	Lleida, Spain	Clay	(Germany) Caroline-Ann Basu	(Portugal) Frederica Piedade (Portugal) Neuza Silva	7–6^{(7–5)}, 2–6, 4–6
Win	20.	20 June 2004	Montemor-o-Novo, Portugal	Hard	(Portugal) Frederica Piedade	(Jamaica) Alanna Broderick (United States) Megan Moulton-Levy	6–4, 6–3
Win	21.	1 August 2004	Pontevedra, Spain	Hard	(Portugal) Frederica Piedade	(United States) Julianna Gates (Australia) Natasha Kersten	7–5, 6–4

== Fed Cup participation ==
=== Singles ===
Edition	Round	Date	Location	Against	Surface	Opponent	W/L	Score
2001 Fed Cup	World Group Playoffs	22 July 2001	Sydney, Australia	Australia	Grass	(Australia) Nicole Pratt	L	1–6, 2–6

=== Doubles ===
Edition	Round	Date	Location	Against	Surface	Partner	Opponents	W/L	Score
2001 Fed Cup	World Group Playoffs	22 July 2001	Sydney, Australia	Australia	Grass	(Switzerland) Daniela Casanova	(Australia) Evie Dominikovic (Australia) Rachel McQuillan	L	3–6, 3–6
