= 2001 Fed Cup World Group – Pool B =

Group B of the 2001 Fed Cup World Group was one of two pools in the World Group of the 2001 Fed Cup. Four teams competed in a round robin competition, with the top team advancing to the final.

	(Belgium) BEL	(Spain) ESP	(Germany) GER	(Australia) AUS	RR; W–L	Set; W–L	Game; W–L	Standings
Belgium		3–0	3–0	3–0	3–0	18–3	120–69	1
Spain	0–3		2–1	3–0	2–1	12–11	108–99	2
Germany	0–3	1–2		3–0	1–2	11–11	97–112	3
Australia	0–3	0–3	0–3		0–3	4–18	82–127	4

== Belgium vs. Germany ==
Belgium
3
Parque Ferial Juan Carlos I, Madrid, Spain
7 November 2001
Red clay (indoors)

Germany
0

			1	2	3
1	(Belgium) (Germany)	Justine Henin; Martina Müller	6; 3	6; 1
2	(Belgium) (Germany)	Kim Clijsters; Bianka Lamade	6; 3	6; 1
3	(Belgium) (Germany)	Els Callens / Laurence Courtois; Bianka Lamade / Barbara Rittner	6; 4	6; 2

== Spain vs. Australia ==
Spain
3
Parque Ferial Juan Carlos I, Madrid, Spain
7 November 2001
Red clay (indoors)

Australia
0

			1	2	3
1	(Spain) (Australia)	Conchita Martínez; Alicia Molik	2; 6	6; 0	7; 5
2	(Spain) (Australia)	Arantxa Sánchez Vicario; Nicole Pratt	3; 6	6; 1	6; 1
3	(Spain) (Australia)	Gala León García / Virginia Ruano Pascual; Evie Dominikovic / Rachel McQuillan	7; 5	6; 4

== Germany vs. Australia ==
Germany
3
Parque Ferial Juan Carlos I, Madrid, Spain
8 November 2001
Red clay (indoors)

Australia
0

			1	2	3
1	(Germany) (Australia)	Bianka Lamade; Alicia Molik	7^{7} 6^{2}	7; 5
2	(Germany) (Australia)	Barbara Rittner; Nicole Pratt	4; 6	6; 3	7; 5
3	(Germany) (Australia)	Martina Müller / Scarlett Werner; Rachel McQuillan / Nicole Pratt	4; 6	6; 2	6; 4

== Belgium vs. Australia ==
Belgium
3
Parque Ferial Juan Carlos I, Madrid, Spain
9 November 2001
Red clay (indoors)

Australia
0

			1	2	3
1	(Belgium) (Australia)	Justine Henin; Rachel McQuillan	7; 5	6; 0
2	(Belgium) (Australia)	Kim Clijsters; Alicia Molik	6; 3	6; 3
3	(Belgium) (Australia)	Els Callens / Kim Clijsters; Rachel McQuillan / Alicia Molik	6; 4	6; 2

== Spain vs. Germany ==
Spain
2
Parque Ferial Juan Carlos I, Madrid, Spain
9 November 2001
Red clay (indoors)

Germany
1

			1	2	3
1	(Spain) (Germany)	Conchita Martínez; Martina Müller	1; 6	5; 7
2	(Spain) (Germany)	Arantxa Sánchez Vicario; Barbara Rittner	7; 5	6; 3
3	(Spain) (Germany)	Virginia Ruano Pascual / Arantxa Sánchez Vicario; Bianka Lamade / Martina Müller	6; 3	2; 6	6; 0

== Belgium vs. Spain ==
Belgium
3
Parque Ferial Juan Carlos I, Madrid, Spain
10 November 2001
Red clay (indoors)

Spain
0

			1	2	3
1	(Belgium) (Spain)	Justine Henin; Conchita Martínez	6; 3	5; 7	7; 5
2	(Belgium) (Spain)	Kim Clijsters; Arantxa Sánchez Vicario	6; 1	6; 2
3	(Belgium) (Spain)	Els Callens / Laurence Courtois; Gala León García / Virginia Ruano Pascual	4; 6	6; 3	7; 5

== See also ==
- Fed Cup structure
