= Marijana Kovačević =

Croatian tennis player

- Country (sports): Croatia
- Born: 20 July 1978 (age 46); Zagreb, Croatia, Yugoslavia
- Plays: Right-handed
- Prize money: $38,316

Singles
- Career record: 141–107
- Career titles: 3 ITF
- Highest ranking: No. 273 (24 August 1998)

Doubles
- Career record: 73–58
- Career titles: 7 ITF
- Highest ranking: No. 292 (6 July 1998)

Marijana Kovačević (born 20 July 1978) is a Croatian former professional tennis player.

A right-handed player from Zagreb, Kovačević made her WTA Tour main-draw debut at the Bol Ladies Open in 1995, as a singles wildcard. She lost her first-round match in three sets to Ludmila Richterová.

Kovačević competed mostly on the ITF Circuit, winning three titles in singles and seven titles in doubles.

== ITF Circuit finals ==
=== Singles: 8 (3–5) ===
Result	Date	Tournament	Surface	Opponent	Score
Loss	4 September 1995	Poreč, Croatia	Clay	(Slovenia) Katja Kovač	3–6, 6–3, 6–7^{(4)}
Loss	23 June 1997	Milan, Italy	Grass	(Romania) Andreea Ehritt-Vanc	2–6, 3–6
Win	14 July 1997	Civitanova Marche, Italy	Clay	(Italy) Katia Piccolini	6–0, 6–0
Win	7 September 1997	Supetar, Croatia	Clay	(Czech Republic) Darina Mecova	2–6, 6–3, 6–3
Loss	14 September 1997	Šibenik, Croatia	Clay	(Croatia) Maja Palaveršić	2–6, 6–4, 2–6
Win	26 July 1998	Lido di Camaiore, Italy	Clay	(Italy) Alice Canepa	5–7, 6–4, 6–2
Loss	28 November 1998	Milan, Italy	Clay	(Germany) Magdalena Kučerová	2–6, 6–3, 3–6
Loss	17 September 2000	Biograd na Moru, Croatia	Clay	(Switzerland) Daniela Casanova	6–1, 1–6, 4–6

=== Doubles: 13 (7–6) ===
Result	Date	Tournament	Surface	Partner	Opponents	Score
Win	20 July 1997	Civitanova Marche, Italy	Clay	(Croatia) Kristina Pojatina	(Italy) Roberta Lamagni (Italy) Flavia Pennetta	6–4, 6–1
Win	14 September 1997	Šibenik, Croatia	Clay	(Croatia) Kristina Pojatina	(Croatia) Ana Radeljević (Slovakia) Katarina Valkyova	6–3, 6–2
Loss	24 May 1998	Modena, Italy	Clay	(Croatia) Kristina Pojatina	(Italy) Alice Canepa (Italy) Alessia Lombardi	7–6, 3–6, 5–7
Win	21 June 1998	Grado, Italy	Clay	(Croatia) Maja Palaveršić	(France) Vanina Casanova (Romania) Andreea Vanc	3–6, 6–3, 6–1
Win	20 July 1998	Lido di Camaiore, Italy	Clay	(Czech Republic) Zuzana Hejdová	(Colombia) Giana Gutiérrez (Brazil) Eugenia Maia	6–2, 6–0
Loss	24 August 1998	Milan, Italy	Grass	(Italy) Giulia Casoni	(Japan) Hiroko Mochizuki (Japan) Ryoko Takemura	6–4, 6–7^{(5)}, 4–6
Win	27 September 1998	Šibenik, Croatia	Hard (i)	(Slovenia) Katarina Srebotnik	(Czech Republic) Blanka Kumbárová (Czech Republic) Olga Vymetálková	6–3, 6–1
Loss	17 May 1999	Pesaro, Italy	Clay	(Russia) Ekaterina Sysoeva	(Serbia and Montenegro) Dragana Ilić (Slovenia) Maja Matevžič	4–6, 3–6
Win	10 April 2000	Hvar, Croatia	Clay	(Italy) Mara Santangelo	(Czech Republic) Zuzana Hejdová (Czech Republic) Petra Kučová	6–3, 4–6, 6–3
Win	28 August 2000	Mostar, Bosnia and Herzegovina	Clay	(Croatia) Maja Palaveršić	(Poland) Magdalena Marszalek (Russia) Daria Panova	6–2, 6–0
Loss	4 September 2000	Zadar, Croatia	Clay	(Croatia) Ivana Višić	(Croatia) Petra Dizdar (Croatia) Mia Marovic	2–6, 3–6
Loss	8 April 2001	Athens, Greece	Clay	(Bulgaria) Biljana Pawlowa-Dimitrova	(Austria) Sandra Klemenschits (Austria) Daniela Klemenschits	3–6, 5–7
Loss	14 April 2002	Makarska, Croatia	Clay	(Switzerland) Daniela Casanova	(Czech Republic) Petra Cetkovská (Slovenia) Tina Hergold	5–7, 2–6
