= 1995 Fed Cup World Group =

Part of tennis tournament

- Date: 21 April – 23 November
- Edition: 5th

Champions
- Spain
- Fed Cup

The World Group was the highest level of Fed Cup competition in 1995. Eight nations competed in a three-round knockout competition. Spain was the two-time defending champion, and successfully defended their title defeating last year's finalist United States in what was their fifth consecutive final.

== Participating teams ==
Participating teams
Austria	Bulgaria	France	Germany
Japan	South Africa	Spain	United States

== Draw ==
Quarterfinals; 21–23 April
Sofia, Bulgaria (Indoor carpet)
1	Spain	3
Bulgaria	2
Freiburg, Germany (Outdoor clay)
Japan	1
3	Germany	4
Metz, France (Outdoor clay)
4	France	3
South Africa	2
Aventura, Florida, United States (Outdoor hard)
Austria	0
2	United States	5

Semifinals; 22–23 July
Santander, Spain (Outdoor clay)
1	Spain	3
3	Germany	2
Wilmington, North Carolina, United States (Indoor carpet)
4	France	2
2	United States	3

Final; 25–26 November
Valencia, Spain (Outdoor clay)
1	Spain	3
2	United States	2

== First round ==
=== Spain vs. Bulgaria ===
Spain
3
Darvenitza, Sofia, Bulgaria
22–23 April 1995
Supreme carpet (indoors)

Bulgaria
2

			1	2	3
1	(Spain) (Bulgaria)	Arantxa Sánchez Vicario; Katerina Maleeva	6; 3	6; 3
2	(Spain) (Bulgaria)	Conchita Martínez; Magdalena Maleeva	6; 2	6; 4
3	(Spain) (Bulgaria)	Arantxa Sánchez Vicario; Magdalena Maleeva	3; 6	3; 6
4	(Spain) (Bulgaria)	Conchita Martínez; Katerina Maleeva	6; 2	6; 1
5	(Spain) (Bulgaria)	Neus Ávila Bonastre / Virginia Ruano Pascual; Katerina Maleeva / Magdalena Maleeva	0; 6	1; 6

=== Japan vs. Germany ===
Japan
1
Freiburg Tennis Club, Freiburg, Germany
22–23 April 1995
Red clay (outdoors)

Germany
4

			1	2	3
1	(Japan) (Germany)	Kyōko Nagatsuka; Anke Huber	0; 6	7; 5	4; 6
2	(Japan) (Germany)	Mana Endo; Sabine Hack	4; 6	6^{5} 7^{7}
3	(Japan) (Germany)	Mana Endo; Anke Huber	3; 6	5; 7
4	(Japan) (Germany)	Kyōko Nagatsuka; Meike Babel	3; 6	6; 4	3; 6
5	(Japan) (Germany)	Kimiko Date / Ai Sugiyama; Meike Babel / Barbara Rittner	6; 2	6; 1

=== France vs. South Africa ===
France
3
Metz Sports Club, Metz, France
21–22 April 1995
Red clay (outdoors)

South Africa
2

			1	2	3
1	(France) (South Africa)	Julie Halard; Amanda Coetzer	2; 6	4; 6
2	(France) (South Africa)	Mary Pierce; Joannette Kruger	6; 4	6; 3
3	(France) (South Africa)	Mary Pierce; Amanda Coetzer	4; 6	3; 6
4	(France) (South Africa)	Julie Halard; Elna Reinach	6; 4	7; 5
5	(France) (South Africa)	Julie Halard / Nathalie Tauziat; Mariaan de Swardt / Elna Reinach	7; 5	6; 2

=== Austria vs. United States ===
Austria
0
Turnberry Isle Resort and Club, Aventura, Florida, United States
22-23 April 1995
Plexipave (outdoors)

United States
5

			1	2	3
1	(Austria) (United States)	Judith Wiesner; Amy Frazier	6; 3	4; 6	3; 6
2	(Austria) (United States)	Barbara Schett; Mary Joe Fernández	2; 6	4; 6
3	(Austria) (United States)	Judith Wiesner; Mary Joe Fernández	3; 6	6; 2	3; 6
4	(Austria) (United States)	Barbara Schett; Amy Frazier	3; 6	7; 5	3; 6
5	(Austria) (United States)	Barbara Schett / Petra Schwarz; Gigi Fernández / Martina Navratilova	2; 6	1; 6

== Semifinals ==
=== Spain vs. Germany ===
Spain
3
Palacio de Deportes de Santander, Santander, Spain
22–23 July 1995
Red clay (outdoors)

Germany
2

			1	2	3
1	(Spain) (Germany)	Conchita Martínez; Anke Huber	6; 2	2; 6	6; 0
2	(Spain) (Germany)	Arantxa Sánchez Vicario; Sabine Hack	4; 6	2; 6
3	(Spain) (Germany)	Arantxa Sánchez Vicario; Anke Huber	6; 3	1; 6	6; 2
4	(Spain) (Germany)	Conchita Martínez; Sabine Hack	6; 0	6; 0
5	(Spain) (Germany)	Virginia Ruano Pascual / María Sánchez Lorenzo; Anke Huber / Claudia Porwik	2; 6	2; 6

=== France vs. United States ===
France
2
Trask Coliseum, Wilmington, North Carolina, United States
22–23 July 1995
Supreme carpet (indoors)

United States
3

			1	2	3
1	(France) (United States)	Mary Pierce; Mary Joe Fernández	7^{7} 6^{1}	6; 3
2	(France) (United States)	Julie Halard; Lindsay Davenport	6^{0} 7^{7}	5; 7
3	(France) (United States)	Mary Pierce; Lindsay Davenport	3; 6	6; 4	0; 6
4	(France) (United States)	Julie Halard; Mary Joe Fernández	1; 6	7; 5	6; 1
5	(France) (United States)	Julie Halard / Nathalie Tauziat; Lindsay Davenport / Gigi Fernández	1; 6	6^{2} 7^{7}

== Final ==
=== Spain vs. United States ===
Spain
3
Valencia Tennis Club, Valencia, Spain
25–26 November 1995
Red clay (outdoors)

United States
2

			1	2	3
1	(Spain) (United States)	Conchita Martínez; Chanda Rubin	7; 5	7^{7} 6^{3}
2	(Spain) (United States)	Arantxa Sánchez Vicario; Mary Joe Fernández	6; 3	6; 2
3	(Spain) (United States)	Conchita Martínez; Mary Joe Fernández	6; 3	6; 4
4	(Spain) (United States)	Arantxa Sánchez Vicario; Chanda Rubin	6; 1	4; 6	4; 6
5	(Spain) (United States)	Virginia Ruano Pascual / María Sánchez Lorenzo; Lindsay Davenport / Gigi Fernández	3; 6	6^{3} 7^{7}

1995 Fed Cup Champions
(Spain)
Spain
Fourth title

== See also ==
- Fed Cup structure
