= Nicole Remis =

Austrian tennis player

- Country (sports): Austria
- Born: 28 January 1980 (age 45); Stockerau, Austria
- Plays: Right-handed
- Prize money: $46,034

Singles
- Career titles: 1 ITF
- Highest ranking: No. 283 (22 September 2003)

Doubles
- Career titles: 3 ITF
- Highest ranking: No. 323 (29 November 1999)

Nicole Remis (born 28 January 1980) is an Austrian former professional tennis player.

Born in Stockerau, Remis reached a best ranking on tour of 283 in the world. She won an ITF tournament in Lecce in 1997 and featured in the main draw of the 2001 Austrian Open.

== ITF finals ==
$25,000 tournaments
$10,000 tournaments

=== Singles: 3 (1–2) ===
Outcome	No.	Date	Tournament	Surface	Opponent	Score
Winner	1.	29 September 1997	Lecce, Italy	Clay	(Austria) Bettina Auer	6–2, 3–2 ret.
Runner-up	1.	1 December 1997	Cairo, Egypt	Clay	(Slovakia) Alena Paulenková	3–6, 3–6
Runner-up	2.	17 May 1999	Salzburg, Austria	Clay	(Germany) Vanessa Henke	7–6, 4–6, 4–6

=== Doubles: 6 (3–3) ===
Outcome	No.	Date	Tournament	Surface	Partner	Opponents	Score
Winner	1.	1 December 1997	Cairo, Egypt	Clay	(Austria) Bianca Kamper	(Austria) Julia Adlbrecht (Austria) Bettina Auer	6–2, 6–2
Runner-up	1.	8 December 1997	Ismailia, Egypt	Clay	(Austria) Bianca Kamper	(France) Berengere Karpenschif (Tunisia) Selima Sfar	3–6, 6–7^{(5–7)}
Runner-up	2.	13 August 2000	Rimini, Italy	Hard	(Hungary) Zsófia Gubacsi	(Estonia) Maret Ani (Estonia) Margit Rüütel	6–3, 3–6, 5–7
Winner	2.	5 November 2002	Villenave-d'Ornon, France	Clay	(Austria) Bianca Kamper	(Madagascar) Natacha Randriantefy (France) Kildine Chevalier	6–3, 6–4
Winner	3.	10 November 2002	Le Havre, France	Clay	(Austria) Bianca Kamper	(Federal Republic of Yugoslavia) Dragana Ilić (Romania) Delia Sescioreanu	6–2, 6–2
Runner-up	3.	27 April 2003	Taranto, Italy	Clay	(Romania) Delia Sescioreanu	(South Africa) Natalie Grandin (South Africa) Kim Grant	2–6, 1–6
