= 2000 Fed Cup World Group – Pool A =

Group A of the 2000 Fed Cup World Group was one of three pools in the World Group of the 2000 Fed Cup. Four teams competed in a round robin competition, with the top team advancing to the knockout stage.

	(Spain) ESP	(Germany) GER	(Italy) ITA	(Croatia) CRO	RR; W–L	Set; W–L	Game; W–L	Standings
Spain		2–1	3–0	2–1	3–0	14–5	100–64	1
Germany	1–2		2–1	2–1	2–1	11–8	90–86	2
Italy	0–3	1–2		3–0	1–2	9–11	91–104	3
Croatia	1–2	1–2	0–3		0–3	5–15	84–111	4

== Spain vs. Italy ==
Spain
3
Bari T.C., Bari, Italy
27 April 2000
Red clay (outdoors)

Italy
0

			1	2	3
1	(Spain) (Italy)	Arantxa Sánchez Vicario; Giulia Casoni	6; 1	6; 1
2	(Spain) (Italy)	Conchita Martínez; Tathiana Garbin	6; 3	6; 3
3	(Spain) (Italy)	Magüi Serna / Cristina Torrens Valero; Giulia Casoni / Rita Grande	6; 2	3; 6	6; 1

== Germany vs. Croatia ==
Germany
2
Bari T.C., Bari, Italy
27 April 2000
Red clay (outdoors)

Croatia
1

			1	2	3
1	(Germany) (Croatia)	Andrea Glass; Jelena Kostanić	7^{11} 6^{9}	1; 6	3; 6
2	(Germany) (Croatia)	Anke Huber; Silvija Talaja	6; 2	6; 2
3	(Germany) (Croatia)	Anke Huber / Barbara Rittner; Jelena Kostanić / Silvija Talaja	6; 4	6; 1

== Spain vs. Croatia ==
Spain
2
Bari T.C., Bari, Italy
28 April 2000
Red clay (outdoors)

Croatia
1

			1	2	3
1	(Spain) (Croatia)	Arantxa Sánchez Vicario; Iva Majoli	6; 4	6; 2
2	(Spain) (Croatia)	Conchita Martínez; Jelena Kostanić	6; 3	6; 2
3	(Spain) (Croatia)	Magüi Serna / Cristina Torrens Valero; Jelena Kostanić / Iva Majoli	3; 6	6^{3} 7^{7}

== Spain vs. Germany ==
Spain
2
Bari T.C., Bari, Italy
29 April 2000
Red clay (outdoors)

Germany
1

			1	2	3
1	(Spain) (Germany)	Arantxa Sánchez Vicario; Andrea Glass	6; 3	6; 3
2	(Spain) (Germany)	Conchita Martínez; Anke Huber	3; 6	1; 6
3	(Spain) (Germany)	Conchita Martínez / Arantxa Sánchez Vicario; Anke Huber / Barbara Rittner	6; 2	6; 3

== Italy vs. Croatia ==
Italy
3
Bari T.C., Bari, Italy
29 April 2000
Red clay (outdoors)

Croatia
0

			1	2	3
1	(Italy) (Croatia)	Tathiana Garbin; Jelena Kostanić	6; 4	7^{8} 6^{6}
2	(Italy) (Croatia)	Silvia Farina Elia; Silvija Talaja	6; 4	7; 5
3	(Italy) (Croatia)	Giulia Casoni / Rita Grande; Jelena Kostanić / Silvija Talaja	6; 4	5; 7	6; 3

== Germany vs. Italy ==
Germany
2
Bari T.C., Bari, Italy
30 April 2000
Red clay (outdoors)

Italy
1

			1	2	3
1	(Germany) (Italy)	Andrea Glass; Tathiana Garbin	2; 6	3; 6
2	(Germany) (Italy)	Anke Huber; Silvia Farina Elia	7^{7} 6^{5}	7; 5
3	(Germany) (Italy)	Anke Huber / Barbara Rittner; Silvia Farina Elia / Rita Grande	6; 3	7; 5

== See also ==
- Fed Cup structure
