= 2000 Fed Cup World Group – Pool C =

Group C of the 2000 Fed Cup World Group was one of three pools in the World Group of the 2000 Fed Cup. Four teams competed in a round robin competition, with the top team advancing to the knockout stage.

	(Belgium) BEL	(France) FRA	(Russia) RUS	(Australia) AUS	RR; W–L	Set; W–L	Game; W–L	Standings
Belgium		2–1	2–1	2–1	3–0	14–10	124–111	1
France	1–2		3–0	2–1	2–1	14–8	117–97	2
Russia	1–2	0–3		2–1	1–2	9–13	98–110	3
Australia	1–2	1–2	1–2		0–3	9–15	118–140	4

== Belgium vs. Australia ==
Belgium
2
Olympic Stadium, Moscow, Russia
27 April 2000
Supreme carpet (indoors)

Australia
1

			1	2	3
1	(Belgium) (Australia)	Laurence Courtois; Nicole Pratt	6; 1	2; 6	7; 5
2	(Belgium) (Australia)	Kim Clijsters; Jelena Dokić	6^{4} 7^{7}	7; 5	7; 9
3	(Belgium) (Australia)	Els Callens / Laurence Courtois; Alicia Molik / Rennae Stubbs	1; 6	6; 0	10; 8

== France vs. Russia ==
France
3
Olympic Stadium, Moscow, Russia
27 April 2000
Supreme carpet (indoors)

Russia
0

			1	2	3
1	(France) (Russia)	Sandrine Testud; Elena Likhovtseva	6; 4	6; 1
2	(France) (Russia)	Julie Halard-Decugis; Anna Kournikova	6; 2	2; 6	6; 1
3	(France) (Russia)	Julie Halard-Decugis / Nathalie Tauziat; Anna Kournikova / Elena Likhovtseva	6; 3	7^{7} 6^{5}

== France vs. Australia ==
France
2
Olympic Stadium, Moscow, Russia
28 April 2000
Supreme carpet (indoors)

Australia
1

			1	2	3
1	(France) (Australia)	Nathalie Dechy; Nicole Pratt	6; 4	5; 7	6; 2
2	(France) (Australia)	Sandrine Testud; Jelena Dokić	7^{7} 6^{4}	5; 7	3; 6
3	(France) (Australia)	Julie Halard-Decugis / Nathalie Tauziat; Alicia Molik / Rennae Stubbs	6; 0	7^{7} 6^{3}

== Belgium vs. France ==
Belgium
2
Olympic Stadium, Moscow, Russia
29 April 2000
Supreme carpet (indoors)

France
1

			1	2	3
1	(Belgium) (France)	Els Callens; Julie Halard-Decugis	3; 6	6; 4	6; 2
2	(Belgium) (France)	Kim Clijsters; Nathalie Tauziat	6; 1	6; 4
3	(Belgium) (France)	Els Callens / Laurence Courtois; Julie Halard-Decugis / Nathalie Tauziat	5; 7	6; 3	3; 6

== Russia vs. Australia ==
Russia
2
Olympic Stadium, Moscow, Russia
29 April 2000
Supreme carpet (indoors)

Australia
1

			1	2	3
1	(Russia) (Australia)	Elena Likhovtseva; Nicole Pratt	6; 3	6; 2
2	(Russia) (Australia)	Anna Kournikova; Jelena Dokić	7^{7} 6^{3}	5; 7	3; 6
3	(Russia) (Australia)	Anna Kournikova / Elena Likhovtseva; Jelena Dokić / Rennae Stubbs	6; 3	4; 6	6; 1

== Belgium vs. Russia ==
Belgium
2
Olympic Stadium, Moscow, Russia
30 April 2000
Supreme carpet (indoors)

Russia
1

			1	2	3
1	(Belgium) (Russia)	Laurence Courtois; Elena Likhovtseva	4; 6	4; 6
2	(Belgium) (Russia)	Kim Clijsters; Anna Kournikova	5; 7	6; 2	6; 4
3	(Belgium) (Russia)	Els Callens / Laurence Courtois; Anna Kournikova / Elena Likhovtseva	6; 4	6; 3

== See also ==
- Fed Cup structure
