= 2001 Fed Cup World Group =

Part of tennis tournament

- Edition: 11th

Champions
- Belgium
- Fed Cup

The World Group was the highest level of competition in the 2001 Fed Cup. For this year, eight teams qualifying from the play-offs were put into two pools of four teams each, with the winner of each pool advancing to the final. The reigning champions United States were meant to be an automatic qualifier for the World Group, but they withdrew due to security risks following the September 11 attacks.

Belgium won their first title, defeating four-time finalist Russia in the final.

== Participating teams ==
Participating teams
Argentina	Australia	Belgium	Czech Republic
France	Germany	Russia	Spain

== Pools ==
Venue: Parque Ferial Juan Carlos I, Madrid, Spain (indoor clay)
Date: 7–10 November

	Pool A	RUS	FRA	ARG	CZE
1	Russia (3–0)		2–1	3–0	2–1
2	France (2–1)	1–2		2–1	3–0
3	Argentina (1–2)	0–3	1–2		2–1
4	Czech Republic (0–3)	1–2	0–3	1–2	

	Pool B	BEL	ESP	GER	AUS
1	Belgium (3–0)		3–0	3–0	3–0
2	Spain (2–1)	0–3		2–1	3–0
3	Germany (1–2)	0–3	1–2		3–0
4	Australia (0–3)	0–3	0–3	0–3	

== Final ==
=== Russia vs. Belgium ===
Russia
1
Parque Ferial Juan Carlos I, Madrid, Spain
11 November 2001
Red clay (indoors)

Belgium
2

			1	2	3
1	(Russia) (Belgium)	Nadia Petrova; Justine Henin	0; 6	3; 6
2	(Russia) (Belgium)	Elena Dementieva; Kim Clijsters	0; 6	4; 6
3	(Russia) (Belgium)	Elena Likhovtseva / Nadia Petrova; Els Callens / Laurence Courtois	7; 5	7^{7} 6^{2}

2001 Fed Cup Champions
(Belgium)
Belgium
First title

== See also ==
- Fed Cup structure
