= 2000 Fed Cup World Group – Pool B =

Group B of the 2000 Fed Cup World Group was one of three pools in the World Group of the 2000 Fed Cup. Four teams competed in a round robin competition, with the top team advancing to the knockout stage.

	(Czech Republic) CZE	(Switzerland) SUI	(Austria) AUT	(Slovakia) SVK	RR; W–L	Set; W–L	Game; W–L	Standings
Czech Republic		2–1	2–1	2–1	3–0	13–9	109–95	1
Switzerland	1–2		2–1	2–1	2–1	12–10	109–103	2
Austria	1–2	1–2		2–0	1–2	11–9	100–103	3
Slovakia	1–2	1–2	0–2		0–3	5–13	81–100	4

== Czech Republic vs. Austria ==
Czech Republic
2
Incheba Hall, Bratislava, Slovakia
27 April 2000
Decoturf (indoors)

Austria
1

			1	2	3
1	(Czech Republic) (Austria)	Květa Hrdličková; Patricia Wartusch	6; 3	1; 6	6; 3
2	(Czech Republic) (Austria)	Denisa Chládková; Barbara Schett	5; 7	6; 4	6; 2
3	(Czech Republic) (Austria)	Dája Bedáňová / Květa Hrdličková; Barbara Schett / Patricia Wartusch	6^{6} 7^{8}	6; 2	3; 6

== Switzerland vs. Slovakia ==
Switzerland
2
Incheba Hall, Bratislava, Slovakia
27 April 2000
Decoturf (indoors)

Slovakia
1

			1	2	3
1	(Switzerland) (Slovakia)	Emmanuelle Gagliardi; Henrieta Nagyová	5; 7	6; 2	6; 1
2	(Switzerland) (Slovakia)	Patty Schnyder; Karina Habšudová	6; 4	6; 1
3	(Switzerland) (Slovakia)	Patty Schnyder / Miroslava Vavrinec; Karina Habšudová / Daniela Hantuchová	7^{10} 6^{8}	2; 6	5; 7

== Czech Republic vs. Switzerland ==
Czech Republic
2
Incheba Hall, Bratislava, Slovakia
28 April 2000
Decoturf (indoors)

Switzerland
1

			1	2	3
1	(Czech Republic) (Switzerland)	Květa Hrdličková; Emmanuelle Gagliardi	6; 1	7^{7} 6^{4}
2	(Czech Republic) (Switzerland)	Denisa Chládková; Patty Schnyder	2; 6	2; 6
3	(Czech Republic) (Switzerland)	Dája Bedáňová / Květa Hrdličková; Emmanuelle Gagliardi / Patty Schnyder	4; 6	6; 1	6; 1

== Switzerland vs. Austria ==
Switzerland
2
Incheba Hall, Bratislava, Slovakia
29 April 2000
Decoturf (indoors)

Austria
1

			1	2	3
1	(Switzerland) (Austria)	Emmanuelle Gagliardi; Patricia Wartusch	6; 2	6; 4
2	(Switzerland) (Austria)	Patty Schnyder; Barbara Schett	6^{4} 7^{7}	5; 7
3	(Switzerland) (Austria)	Emmanuelle Gagliardi / Patty Schnyder; Barbara Schett / Patricia Wartusch	2; 6	6; 4	8; 6

== Czech Republic vs. Slovakia ==
Czech Republic
2
Incheba Hall, Bratislava, Slovakia
29 April 2000
Decoturf (indoors)

Slovakia
1

			1	2	3
1	(Czech Republic) (Slovakia)	Květa Hrdličková; Daniela Hantuchová	4; 6	2; 6
2	(Czech Republic) (Slovakia)	Denisa Chládková; Karina Habšudová	6; 4	6; 4
3	(Czech Republic) (Slovakia)	Dája Bedáňová / Květa Hrdličková; Karina Habšudová / Daniela Hantuchová	7; 5	6; 3

== Austria vs. Slovakia ==
Austria
2
Incheba Hall, Bratislava, Slovakia
30 April 2000
Decoturf (indoors)

Slovakia
0

			1	2	3
1	(Austria) (Slovakia)	Marion Maruska; Daniela Hantuchová	6; 4	7^{7} 6^{1}
2	(Austria) (Slovakia)	Barbara Schett; Karina Habšudová	6; 4	7; 5
3	(Austria) (Slovakia)					not played

== See also ==
- Fed Cup structure
