= Leyla Musalem =

Chilean tennis player

- Country (sports): Chile
- Born: 20 October 1948 (age 76)
- Plays: Right-handed

Singles
- Career record: 3-1 (Federation Cup)

Doubles
- Career record: 1-2 (Federation Cup)
Medal record
Pan American Games
Bronze medal – third place	1975 Mexico City	Singles

Leyla Musalem (born 20 October 1948) is a Chilean former tennis player.

At the 1975 Pan American Games in Mexico City, Musalem won a bronze medal for Chile in the singles competition, finishing behind Lele Forood and Patricia Medrado.

Musalem was a member of Chile's Federation Cup team in 1977 and 1978. Her two ties in 1977 both came against Argentina and she registered two singles wins over Viviana González. In 1978 she helped Chile progress past the first round of the World Group with a win over Uruguay, but lost her singles and doubles matches when they were eliminated in the second round by the Netherlands.

Her husband, Sergio Elías, is president of the Chile Tennis Federation.

In 2019 she was briefly the world's top ranked over 70s player on the ITF Senior's Tour.
