= Palacio de Congresos de Maspalomas =

Indoor arena in Gran Canaria, Spain

Coordinates: 27.743024°N 15.602239°W

Palacio de Congresos de Maspalomas is an indoor arena in San Bartolomé de Tirajana, Gran Canaria, Canary Islands. It currently holds 5,000 spectators and hosts indoor sporting events such as tennis.

| Preceded by Juan Carlos I Park | Fed Cup; Final Four venue 2002 | Succeeded by Olympic Stadium |
