= Tennis in Germany =

World No. 1 ranked tennis players from Germany

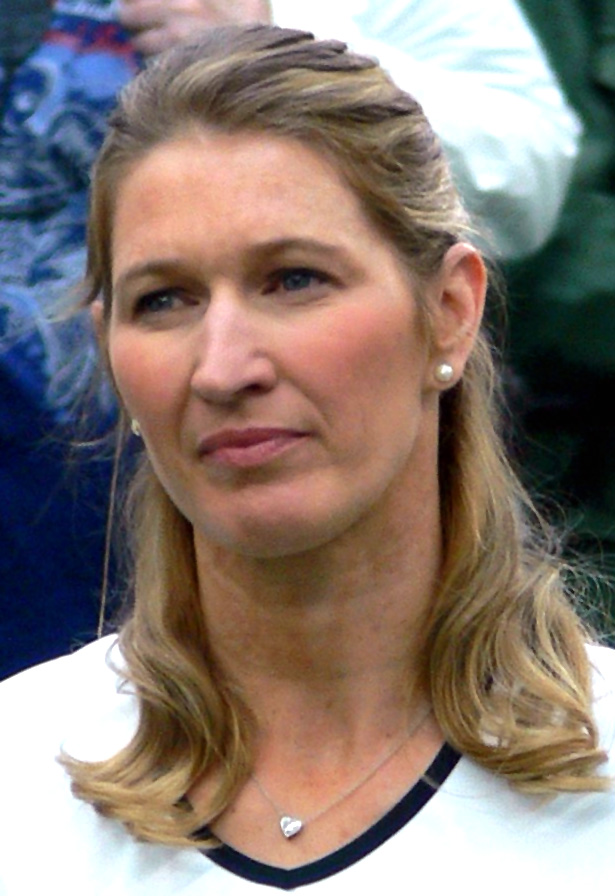
Steffi Graf

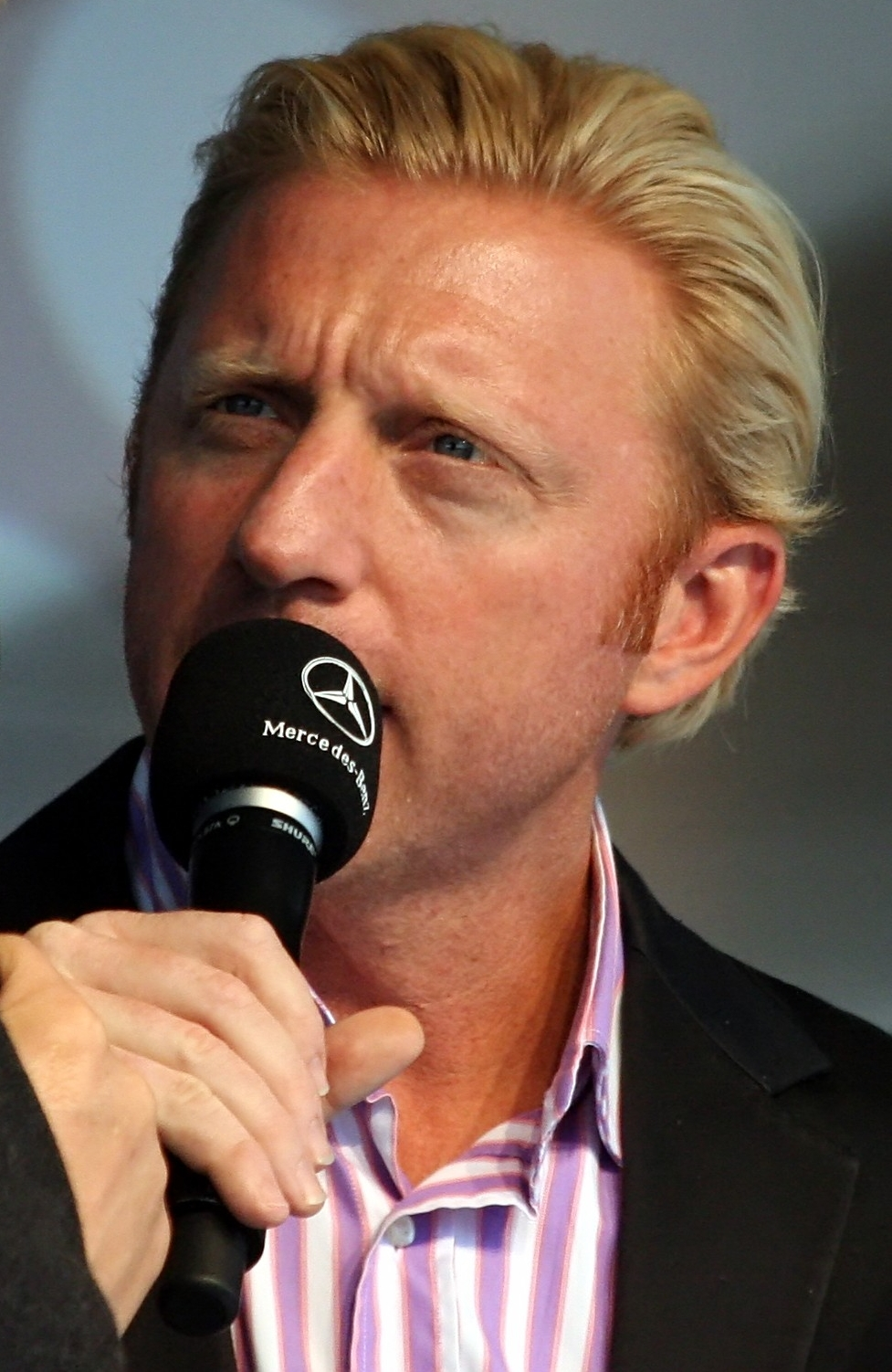
Boris Becker

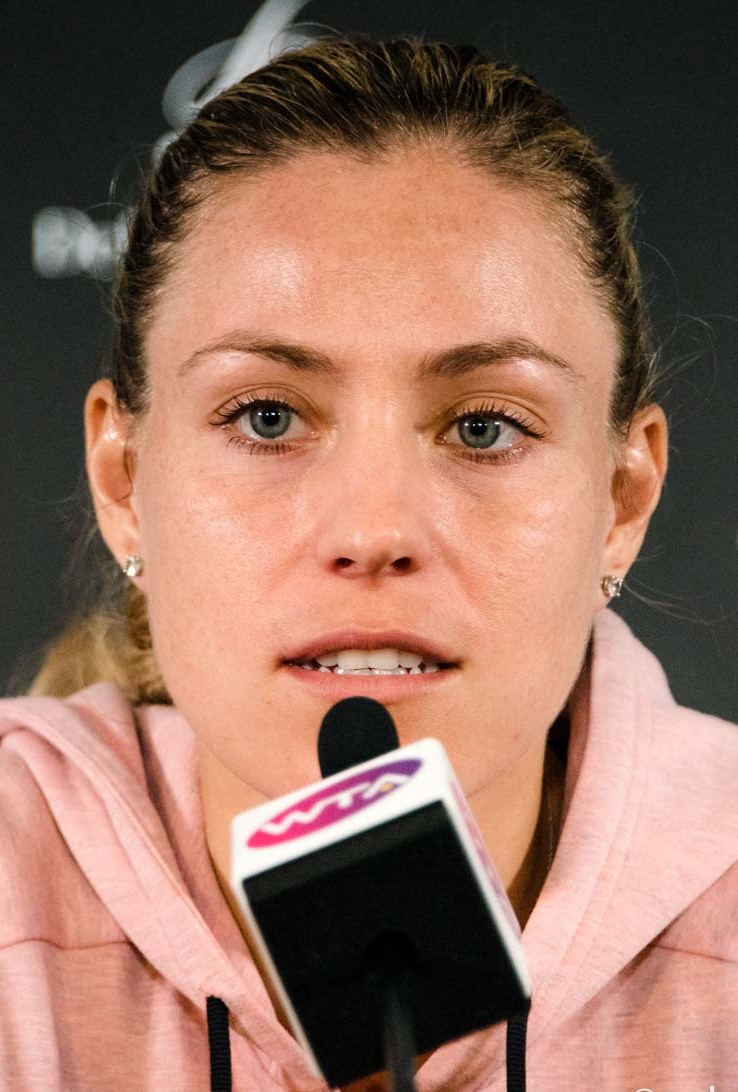
Angelique Kerber

Alexander Zverev

Tennis is one of the most popular sports in Germany with more than five million active players. The German Tennis Federation is the largest tennis federation in the world with ca. 1.4 million members.

All statistics below are based on the data from the ATP and the WTA in the Open Era (since 1968).

Germany won the 5th most singles Grand Slam titles and is among the 10 most successful nations regarding all Grand Slam titles combined (singles, doubles and mixed). German female tennis players won the 2nd most singles titles on the WTA Tour while German male tennis players have won the 7nd most singles titles on the ATP Tour.

Singles Grand Slam champions from Germany before the Open Era were Gottfried von Cramm, who became the first non American, British, Australian or French player to win a singles slam title at the 1934 French Open, Henner Henkel, Cilly Aussem and Hilde Krahwinkel Sperling, with von Cramm and Krahwinkel Sperling becoming world number 1.

Active players are in boldface.

All lists are correct as of 22 November 2026.

== Highest ranked players ==
HR = Highest ranking, CR = Current ranking
Players are sorted by rankings, titles, and finals.

=== Singles ===
The lists include the 50 best ranked German players. The rankings were introduced in 1973 (men) and 1975 (women).

==== Men ====
Player	Ranking No.		ATP Tour					
Player	HR	CR	First	Last	Titles	Finals	Win–loss	Win %
Boris Becker	**1**	–	1983	1999	49	77	713–214	76.9%
**Alexander Zverev**	**1**	**1**	2013	2026	26	45	589–242	70.9%
Michael Stich	2	–	1989	1997	18	31	385–176	68.6%
Tommy Haas	2	–	1996	2017	15	28	569–338	62.7%
Nicolas Kiefer	4	–	1994	2010	6	19	366–274	57.2%
Rainer Schüttler	5	–	1995	2011	4	12	327–337	49.2%
Carl-Uwe Steeb	14	–	1986	1996	3	8	212–212	50.0%
Philipp Kohlschreiber	16	–	2002	2022	8	18	478–387	55.3%
Florian Mayer	18	–	2004	2018	2	7	243–261	48.2%
Ulrich Pinner	19	–	1973	1983	2	3	139–125	52.7%
Karl Meiler	20	–	1968	1985	4	17	253–191	57.0%
**Jan-Lennard Struff**	21	39	2013	2026	1	5	262–287	47.7%
Bernd Karbacher	22	–	1991	2000	2	3	135–161	45.6%
Eric Jelen	23	–	1983	1991	1	2	135–136	49.8%
Andreas Maurer	24	–	1978	1989	1	3	114–142	44.5%
Mischa Zverev	25	–	2006	2021	1	3	133–199	40.1%
Marc-Kevin Goellner	26	–	1992	2003	2	3	160–194	45.2%
David Prinosil	28	–	1992	2004	3	6	169–221	43.3%
Hans Pohmann	30	–	1968	1979	1	3	124–125	49.8%
Rolf Gehring	30	–	1974	1985	1	3	119–140	45.9%
Jürgen Fassbender	31	–	1968	1980	3	6	185–170	52.1%
Andreas Beck	33	–	2004	2016	0	1	41–65	38.7%
Benjamin Becker	35	–	2006	2017	1	3	153–220	41.0%
Philipp Petzschner	35	–	2003	2014	1	3	88–107	45.1%
Oscar Otte	36	–	2018	2024	0	0	33–52	38.8%
Karsten Braasch	38	–	1989	2000	0	1	68–96	41.5%
Hans Schwaier	38	–	1981	1990	0	1	62–89	41.1%
Peter Gojowczyk	39	–	2010	2022	1	3	75–99	43.1%
Hendrik Dreekmann	39	–	1993	2003	0	2	97–118	45.1%
Martin Sinner	42	–	1989	1998	2	2	50–78	39.1%
Michael Berrer	42	–	2004	2016	0	2	88–145	37.8%
Patrik Kühnen	43	–	1985	1996	0	2	127–153	45.4%
**Daniel Altmaier**	44	72	2017	2026	0	0	85–139	37.9%
**Yannick Hanfmann**	45	67	2017	2026	0	3	110–113	49.3%
**Maximilian Marterer**	45	747	2015	2025	0	0	42–79	34.7%
Tore Meinecke	46	–	1985	1989	0	1	40–51	44.0%
Markus Zoecke	48	–	1989	1995	1	2	67–103	39.4%
Michael Westphal	49	–	1982	1989	0	2	81–106	43.3%
Dominik Koepfer	49	–	2017	2025	0	0	61–75	44.9%
Peter Elter	51	–	1976	1986	0	3	87–120	42.0%
Alex Rădulescu	51	–	1992	1998	0	1	40–56	41.7%
Daniel Brands	51	–	2007	2019	0	0	60–93	39.2%
Jens Wöhrmann	54	–	1989	1991	0	0	20–28	41.7%
Simon Greul	55	–	2003	2011	0	0	44–72	37.9%
Ricky Osterthun	58	–	1984	1990	1	3	60–79	43.2%
Damir Keretić	58	–	1979	1989	0	0	90–122	42.5%
Björn Phau	59	–	1998	2014	0	0	80–138	36.7%
Denis Gremelmayr	59	–	2002	2012	0	0	32–58	35.6%
Christian Saceanu	60	–	1985	1994	2	3	71–110	39.2%
Oliver Gross	60	–	1993	2003	0	1	49–76	39.2%

==== Women ====
Player	Ranking No.		WTA Tour					
Player	HR	CR	First	Last	Titles	Finals	Win–loss	Win %
Steffi Graf	**1**	–	1982	1999	107	138	885–106	89.3%
Angelique Kerber	**1**	–	2006	2024	14	32	488–292	62.6%
Anke Huber	4	–	1990	2001	12	23	418–213	66.2%
Claudia Kohde-Kilsch	4	–	1980	1992	6	14	368–228	61.7%
Sylvia Hanika	5	–	1977	1990	4	19	378–223	62.9%
Bettina Bunge	6	–	1978	1989	4	12	293–177	62.3%
Julia Görges	9	–	2007	2020	7	16	316–258	55.1%
Andrea Petkovic	9	–	2006	2022	7	13	290–237	55.0%
Sabine Lisicki	12	–	2006	2023	4	9	215–177	54.8%
Sabine Hack	13	–	1985	1997	4	8	181–135	57.3%
Anna-Lena Grönefeld	14	–	2003	2011	1	4	120–142	45.8%
Katja Ebbinghaus	15	–	1968	1979	0	1	77–78	49.7%
Eva Pfaff	17	–	1980	1992	0	1	141–191	42.5%
Isabel Cueto	20	–	1984	1992	5	8	130–102	56.0%
**Mona Barthel**	23	200	2010	2026	4	7	153–181	45.8%
Helga Masthoff	24	–	1968	1979	9	17	173–68	71.8%
Barbara Rittner	24	–	1990	2004	2	5	220–225	49.4%
Laura Siegemund	27	192	2010	2026	2	5	149–159	48.4%
Meike Babel	27	–	1991	2000	0	3	70–86	44.9%
Iris Riedel-Kühn	28	–	1972	1982	0	0	51–68	42.9%
Claudia Porwik	29	–	1986	1996	0	1	116–145	44.4%
Petra Begerow	29	–	1992	1999	0	0	34–66	34.0%
Wiltrud Probst	31	–	1986	1998	2	2	118–161	42.3%
Martina Müller	33	–	2000	2008	1	2	64–114	36.0%
**Tatjana Maria**	36	67	2006	2026	4	5	171–269	38.9%
Marlene Weingärtner	36	–	1995	2005	0	1	84–135	38.4%
Annika Beck	37	–	2012	2017	2	4	91–115	44.2%
Karin Kschwendt	37	–	1992	1996	0	1	53–65	44.9%
**Eva Lys**	39	175	2022	2026	0	0	48–54	47.1%
Silke Meier	40	–	1985	1997	0	1	78–140	35.8%
Christina Singer	41	–	1986	1997	0	0	56–86	39.4%
Heidi Eisterlehner	42	–	1970	1984	0	1	45–66	40.5%
Myriam Schropp	42	–	1982	1987	0	0	27–48	36.0%
Jana Kandarr	43	–	1994	2003	0	0	68–121	36.0%
**Anna-Lena Friedsam**	45	252	2014	2026	0	2	64–88	42.1%
Marketa Kochta	45	–	1990	1997	0	0	32–67	32.3%
**Tamara Korpatsch**	46	66	2017	2026	2	3	52–75	40.9%
Anca Barna	46	–	1994	2005	0	1	70–109	39.1%
Carina Witthöft	48	–	2012	2018	1	1	49–69	41.5%
Veronika Martinek	49	–	1988	1998	1	2	73–104	41.2%
Julia Schruff	52	–	2003	2010	0	1	48–83	36.6%
Andrea Glass	53	–	1992	2002	0	0	38–90	29.7%
Kristina Barrois	57	–	2006	2013	0	2	34–62	35.4%
Bianka Lamade	59	–	2000	2003	1	1	22–30	42.3%
**Jule Niemeier**	61	443	2019	2026	0	0	39–60	39.4%
Silke Frankl	67	–	1988	1995	0	0	42–77	35.3%
Elena Wagner	68	–	1997	2001	0	1	29–36	44.6%
Angelika Rösch	69	–	2002	2007	0	0	10–28	26.3%
Maja Živec-Škulj	73	–	1989	1996	0	0	11–30	26.8%
**Ella Seidel**	78	236	2023	2026	0	0	20–30	40.0%

=== Doubles ===
The lists include the 20 best ranked German players. The rankings were introduced in 1976 (men) and 1984 (women).

==== Men ====
Player	Ranking No.		ATP Tour					
Player	HR	CR	First	Last	Titles	Finals	Win–loss	Win %
**Kevin Krawietz**	5	9	2009	2026	15	28	301–178	62.8%
Boris Becker	6	–	1983	2001	15	27	254–135	65.3%
**Tim Pütz**	6	11	2017	2026	14	28	272–146	65.1%
Udo Riglewski	6	–	1982	1995	10	20	168–163	50.8%
Andreas Mies	8	–	2018	2025	7	9	154–132	53.8%
Michael Stich	9	–	1989	2009	10	16	162–111	59.3%
Philipp Petzschner	9	–	2001	2018	8	15	177–173	50.6%
Karl Meiler	12	–	1968	1985	17	24	189–124	60.4%
David Prinosil	12	–	1992	2003	10	21	254–208	55.0%
Alexander Waske	16	–	2001	2012	4	8	111–76	59.4%
Christopher Kas	17	–	2006	2014	5	20	191–202	48.6%
Hans Pohmann	18	–	1968	1979	5	18	164–97	62.8%
Eric Jelen	18	–	1982	1992	5	11	109–80	57.7%
**Jan-Lennard Struff**	21	215	2012	2026	5	9	110–115	48.9%
Jürgen Fassbender	22	–	1968	1980	16	35	250–129	66.0%
Marc-Kevin Goellner	25	–	1992	2002	4	15	188–173	52.1%
Michael Kohlmann	27	–	1998	2013	5	19	219–261	45.6%
Patrik Kühnen	28	–	1985	1997	3	6	110–118	48.2%
**Constantin Frantzen**	29	33	2023	2026	2	8	75–75	50.0%
**Jakob Schnaitter**	31	34	2024	2026	1	4	51–51	50.0%
**Mark Wallner**	31	34	2024	2026	1	4	51–51	50.0%

==== Women ====
Player	Ranking No.		WTA Tour					
Player	HR	CR	First	Last	Titles	Finals	Win–loss	Win %
Claudia Kohde-Kilsch	3	–	1980	1994	25	64	438–175	71.5%
Steffi Graf	3	–	1983	1999	11	18	179–72	71.3%
Laura Siegemund	4	29	2006	2026	16	27	225–131	63.2%
Anna-Lena Grönefeld	7	–	2003	2019	17	44	407–298	57.7%
Eva Pfaff	11	–	1980	1993	8	18	277–209	57.0%
Julia Görges	12	–	2007	2020	5	16	204–175	53.8%
Bettina Bunge	17	–	1978	1989	3	10	198–153	56.4%
Barbara Rittner	23	–	1990	2005	3	13	162–199	44.9%
Anke Huber	23	–	1990	2001	1	4	133–129	50.8%
Claudia Porwik	24	–	1985	1997	6	10	138–142	49.3%
Wiltrud Probst	32	–	1986	1999	0	7	104–155	40.2%
**Anna-Lena Friedsam**	34	376	2013	2026	4	8	76–67	53.1%
Marlene Weingärtner	34	–	1995	2008	1	2	56–89	38.6%
Sabine Lisicki	35	–	2008	2023	4	5	66–50	56.9%
Elena Wagner	39	–	1997	2001	2	4	45–55	45.0%
Christina Singer	44	–	1986	1999	0	1	78–115	40.4%
Karin Kschwendt	45	–	1992	1996	4	6	55–64	46.2%
Meike Babel	45	–	1991	2000	1	3	49–73	40.2%
Jasmin Wöhr	46	–	1996	2012	4	10	108–171	38.7%
Andrea Petkovic	46	–	2007	2022	1	3	73–100	42.2%

== Singles achievements timeline ==
Rankings before the first official rankings in 1973 (ATP) and 1975 (WTA) are estimated or per Lance Tingay (*). GS = Grand Slam

Year	Highest year-end ranked player				Titles					
Year	Men		Women		Men		Women		Total	
Year	Player	Rank	Player	Rank	ATP	GS	WTA	GS	Total	GS
1968	Wilhelm Bungert*	44*	Helga Masthoff*	12*	0		0		0	
1969	Christian Kuhnke*	42*	Helga Masthoff (2)*	16*	0		1		1	
1970	Harald Elschenbroich*	66*	Helga Masthoff (3)*	4*	1		4		5	
1971	Harald Elschenbroich (2)*	82*	Helga Masthoff (4)*	9*	1		1		2	
1972	Harald Elschenbroich (3)*	61*	Helga Masthoff (5)*	12*	1		1		2	
1973	Karl Meiler	32	Helga Masthoff (6)*	8*	2		2		4	
1974	Hans Pohmann	44	Helga Masthoff (7)*	8*	3		1		4	
1975	Karl Meiler (2)	31	Iris Riedel-Kühn	28	1		0		1	
1976	Hans Pohmann (2)	40	Helga Masthoff (8)	24	0		0		0	
1977	Karl Meiler (3)	35	Katja Ebbinghaus	19	1		0		1	
1978	Ulrich Pinner	34	Sylvia Hanika	35	2		0		2	
1979	Ulrich Pinner (2)	23	Sylvia Hanika (2)	16	1		0		1	
1980	Rolf Gehring	38	Sylvia Hanika (3)	14	1		0		1	
1981	Rolf Gehring (2)	42	Sylvia Hanika (4)	6	0		2		2	
1982	Damir Keretić	69	Bettina Bunge	9	0		5		5	
1983	Rolf Gehring (3)	93	Sylvia Hanika (5)	6	0		1		1	
1984	Boris Becker	66	Claudia Kohde-Kilsch	8	0		2		2	
1985	Boris Becker (2)	6	Claudia Kohde-Kilsch (2)	5	5	1	1		6	1
1986	Boris Becker (3)	2	Steffi Graf	3	6	1	9		15	1
1987	Boris Becker (4)	5	Steffi Graf (2)	**1**	3		11	1	14	1
1988	Boris Becker (5)	4	Steffi Graf (3)	**1**	8		14	4	22	4
1989	Boris Becker (6)	2	Steffi Graf (4)	**1**	7	2	16	3	23	5
1990	Boris Becker (7)	2	Steffi Graf (5)	**1**	6		15	1	21	1
1991	Boris Becker (8)	3	Steffi Graf (6)	2	10	2	9	1	19	3
1992	Boris Becker (9)	5	Steffi Graf (7)	2	9		10	1	19	1
1993	Michael Stich	2	Steffi Graf (8)	**1**	9		12	3	21	3
1994	Boris Becker (10)	3	Steffi Graf (9)	**1**	9		11	1	20	1
1995	Boris Becker (11)	4	Steffi Graf (10)	**1**	7		11	3	18	3
1996	Boris Becker (12)	6	Steffi Graf (11)	**1**	8	1	10	3	18	4
1997	Nicolas Kiefer	32	Anke Huber	14	1		1		2	
1998	Tommy Haas	34	Steffi Graf (12)	9	0		3		3	
1999	Nicolas Kiefer (2)	6	Anke Huber (2)	16	5		1	1	6	1
2000	Nicolas Kiefer (3)	20	Anke Huber (3)	19	3		2		5	
2001	Tommy Haas (2)	8	Anke Huber (4)	18	5		2		7	
2002	Tommy Haas (3)	11	Anca Barna	62	1		1		2	
2003	Rainer Schüttler	6	Marlene Weingärtner	47	2		0		2	
2004	Tommy Haas (4)	17	Anna-Lena Grönefeld	68	2		0		2	
2005	Nicolas Kiefer (4)	22	Anna-Lena Grönefeld (2)	21	0		0		0	
2006	Tommy Haas (5)	11	Anna-Lena Grönefeld (3)	19	3		1		4	
2007	Tommy Haas (6)	12	Martina Müller	54	2		1		3	
2008	Philipp Kohlschreiber	28	Sabine Lisicki	54	2		0		2	
2009	Tommy Haas (7)	18	Sabine Lisicki (2)	23	2		2		4	
2010	Philipp Kohlschreiber (2)	34	Andrea Petkovic	32	0		1		1	
2011	Florian Mayer	23	Andrea Petkovic (2)	10	2		4		6	
2012	Philipp Kohlschreiber (3)	20	Angelique Kerber	5	2		3		5	
2013	Tommy Haas (8)	12	Angelique Kerber (2)	9	2		2		4	
2014	Philipp Kohlschreiber (4)	24	Angelique Kerber (3)	10	1		6		7	
2015	Philipp Kohlschreiber (5)	34	Angelique Kerber (4)	10	1		6		7	
2016	**Alexander Zverev**	24	Angelique Kerber (5)	**1**	3		4	2	7	2
2017	**Alexander Zverev** (2)	4	Julia Görges	14	7		5		12	
2018	**Alexander Zverev** (3)	4	Angelique Kerber (6)	2	5		5	1	10	1
2019	**Alexander Zverev** (4)	7	Angelique Kerber (7)	20	1		1		2	
2020	**Alexander Zverev** (5)	7	Angelique Kerber (8)	25	2		0		2	
2021	**Alexander Zverev** (6)	3	Angelique Kerber (9)	16	6		2		8	
2022	**Alexander Zverev** (7)	12	**Jule Niemeier**	61	0		2		2	
2023	**Alexander Zverev** (8)	7	**Tatjana Maria**	57	2		2		4	
2024	**Alexander Zverev** (9)	2	Laura Siegemund	84	3		0		3	
2025	**Alexander Zverev** (10)	3	**Eva Lys**	40	1		1		2	
2026	**Alexander Zverev** (11)	**1**	**Tamara Korpatsch**	67	2	2	1		3	2
2027	**Alexander Zverev** (12)	**1**	**Tamara Korpatsch** (2)	66	0		0			
Total					169	9	208	25	377	34

== Best results at significant tournaments ==
=== Singles ===
The lists include all German players who reached at least a quarterfinal at a Grand Slam, ATP/WTA Finals or Olympic tournament.

==== Men ====
Player	Austr. Open	French Open	Wimbledon	US Open	ATP Finals	Olympics
Boris Becker	**Win (2)**	Semifinal	**Win (3)**	**Win**	**Win (3)**	3rd round
**Alexander Zverev**	Final	**Win**	Final	**Win**	**Win (2)**	**Gold**
Michael Stich	Semifinal	Final	**Win**	Final	**Win**	2nd round
Tommy Haas	Semifinal	Quarterfinal	Semifinal	Quarterfinal	–	Silver
Rainer Schüttler	Final	4th round	Semifinal	4th round	Semifinal	2nd round
Nicolas Kiefer	Semifinal	4th round	Quarterfinal	Quarterfinal	Semifinal	3rd round
Karl Meiler	Semifinal	3rd round	3rd round	4th round	–	–
Bernd Karbacher	3rd round	Quarterfinal	2nd round	Quarterfinal	–	–
Philipp Kohlschreiber	4th round	4th round	Quarterfinal	4th round	–	2nd round
Carl-Uwe Steeb	4th round	4th round	2nd round	4th round	–	Quarterfinal
**Jan-Lennard Struff**	2nd round	4th round	Quarterfinal	4th round	–	2nd round
Mischa Zverev	Quarterfinal	3rd round	3rd round	4th round	–	–
Florian Mayer	4th round	2nd round	Quarterfinal	3rd round	–	1st round
Hans Pohmann	–	Quarterfinal	4th round	3rd round	–	–
Hendrik Dreekmann	3rd round	Quarterfinal	2nd round	3rd round	–	–
Patrik Kühnen	3rd round	3rd round	Quarterfinal	2nd round	–	–
Jürgen Fassbender	–	3rd round	Quarterfinal	2nd round	–	–
Alex Rădulescu	1st round	1st round	Quarterfinal	3rd round	–	–
Alexander Popp	2nd round	1st round	Quarterfinal	2nd round	–	–

==== Women ====
Player	Austr. Open	French Open	Wimbledon	US Open	WTA Finals	Olympics
Steffi Graf	**Win (4)**	**Win (6)**	**Win (7)**	**Win (5)**	**Win (5)**	**Gold**
Angelique Kerber	**Win**	Quarterfinal	**Win**	**Win**	Final	Silver
Sylvia Hanika	Quarterfinal	Final	4th round	Quarterfinal	**Win**	3rd round
Anke Huber	Final	Semifinal	4th round	Quarterfinal	Final	Quarterfinal
Helga Masthoff	Quarterfinal	Final	Quarterfinal	Semifinal	–	–
Sabine Lisicki	4th round	3rd round	Final	4th round	–	3rd round
Claudia Kohde-Kilsch	Semifinal	Semifinal	Quarterfinal	Quarterfinal	Quarterfinal	2nd round
Bettina Bunge	3rd round	4th round	Semifinal	4th round	Semifinal	–
Andrea Petkovic	Quarterfinal	Semifinal	3rd round	Quarterfinal	–	1st round
Julia Görges	4th round	4th round	Semifinal	4th round	–	3rd round
Claudia Porwik	Semifinal	3rd round	3rd round	3rd round	–	–
**Tatjana Maria**	2nd round	2nd round	Semifinal	2nd round	–	1st round
Laura Siegemund	3rd round	Quarterfinal	Quarterfinal	3rd round	–	Quarterfinal
Katja Ebbinghaus	Quarterfinal	Quarterfinal	3rd round	Quarterfinal	–	–
Sabine Hack	4th round	Quarterfinal	2nd round	3rd round	–	–
Eva Pfaff	Quarterfinal	3rd round	4th round	2nd round	–	–
Anna-Lena Grönefeld	3rd round	Quarterfinal	1st round	4th round	–	–
**Jule Niemeier**	2nd round	1st round	Quarterfinal	4th round	–	–
Heidi Eisterlehner	Quarterfinal	3rd round	2nd round	1st round	–	–

=== Doubles ===
The lists include all German players who reached at least a final at a Grand Slam, ATP/WTA Finals or Olympic tournament.

==== Men ====
Player	Austr. Open	French Open	Wimbledon	US Open	ATP Finals	Olympics
**Kevin Krawietz**	Semifinal	**Win (2)**	Semifinal	Final	**Win**	Quarterfinal
Andreas Mies	Quarterfinal	**Win (2)**	Quarterfinal	Semifinal	Round robin	–
Michael Stich	Quarterfinal	3rd round	**Win**	Semifinal	–	**Gold**
Philipp Petzschner	Quarterfinal	3rd round	**Win**	**Win**	Round robin	1st round
**Tim Pütz**	Semifinal	Quarterfinal	Semifinal	Final	**Win**	Quarterfinal
Boris Becker	Quarterfinal	1st round	2nd round	2nd round	–	**Gold**
David Prinosil	Final	Final	Quarterfinal	Semifinal	–	Bronze
Marc-Kevin Goellner	3rd round	Final	Semifinal	3rd round	–	Bronze
Rainer Schüttler	2nd round	Quarterfinal	Quarterfinal	2nd round	–	Silver
Nicolas Kiefer	2nd round	1st round	2nd round	1st round	–	Silver

==== Women ====
Player	Austr. Open	French Open	Wimbledon	US Open	WTA Finals	Olympics
Claudia Kohde-Kilsch	Final	Final	**Win**	**Win**	Final	Bronze
Laura Siegemund	Quarterfinal	Quarterfinal	Quarterfinal	**Win**	**Win**	1st round
Steffi Graf	Semifinal	Final	**Win**	Semifinal	Semifinal	Bronze
Eva Pfaff	Final	Quarterfinal	Quarterfinal	3rd round	Final	–
Sabine Lisicki	2nd round	3rd round	Final	Quarterfinal	–	2nd round
Helga Masthoff	2nd round	Final	Quarterfinal	–	–	–
Katja Ebbinghaus	1st round	Final	3rd round	1st round	–	–

==== Mixed ====
Player	Austr. Open	French Open	Wimbledon	US Open	Olympics
Anna-Lena Grönefeld	Quarterfinal	**Win**	**Win**	Semifinal	–
Laura Siegemund	Quarterfinal	**Win**	Quarterfinal	**Win**	Quarterfinal
**Tim Pütz**	2nd round	**Win**	–	2nd round	–
Julia Görges	Quarterfinal	Final	Quarterfinal	1st round	–

== Records ==
Current new records are shown in boldface.

=== Singles ===
Record		Men		Women	
Record		Player	Record	Player	Record
Titles (Finals)	Overall	Boris Becker	49 (77)	Steffi Graf	107 (138)
Titles (Finals)	Grand Slams	Boris Becker	6 (10)	Steffi Graf	22 (31)
Titles (Finals)	Australian Open	Boris Becker	2 (2)	Steffi Graf	4 (5)
Titles (Finals)	French Open	**Alexander Zverev**	1 (2)	Steffi Graf	6 (9)
Titles (Finals)	Wimbledon	Boris Becker	3 (7)	Steffi Graf	7 (9)
Titles (Finals)	US Open	**Alexander Zverev**	1 (2)	Steffi Graf	5 (8)
Titles (Finals)	ATP / WTA Finals	Boris Becker	3 (8)	Steffi Graf	5 (6)
Titles (Finals)	Olympics	**Alexander Zverev**	1 (1)	Steffi Graf	1 (2)
Titles (Finals)	Davis / BJK Cup	Kühnen, Steeb	3 (3)	Steffi Graf	2 (2)
Titles (Finals)	Hard	**Alexander Zverev**	16 (25)	Steffi Graf	37 (50)
Titles (Finals)	Clay	**Alexander Zverev**	10 (16)	Steffi Graf	32 (43)
Titles (Finals)	Grass	Boris Becker	7 (12)	Steffi Graf	7 (9)
Titles (Finals)	Carpet	Boris Becker	26 (37)	Steffi Graf	31 (36)
Matches won (pld)	Overall	Boris Becker	713 (927)	Steffi Graf	885 (991)
Matches won (pld)	Grand Slams	Boris Becker	163 (203)	Steffi Graf	278 (310)
Matches won (pld)	Australian Open	**Alexander Zverev**	36 (47)	Steffi Graf	47 (53)
Matches won (pld)	French Open	**Alexander Zverev**	45 (55)	Steffi Graf	84 (94)
Matches won (pld)	Wimbledon	Boris Becker	71 (83)	Steffi Graf	74 (81)
Matches won (pld)	US Open	Boris Becker	37 (47)	Steffi Graf	73 (82)
Matches won (pld)	ATP / WTA Finals	Boris Becker	36 (49)	Steffi Graf	33 (41)
Matches won (pld)	Olympics	**Alexander Zverev**	9 (10)	Angelique Kerber	11 (14)
Matches won (pld)	Davis / BJK Cup	Boris Becker	38 (41)	Anke Huber	24 (33)
Matches won (pld)	Hard	**Alexander Zverev**	**346 (497)**	Steffi Graf	343 (382)
Matches won (pld)	Clay	**Alexander Zverev**	189 (255)	Steffi Graf	271 (301)
Matches won (pld)	Grass	Boris Becker	116 (141)	Claudia Kohde-Kilsch	93 (139)
Matches won (pld)	Carpet	Boris Becker	258 (322)	Steffi Graf	187 (210)
Matches won (pld)	vs. Top 10	Boris Becker	121 (186)	Steffi Graf	208 (271)
Match win %	Overall	Boris Becker	76.9%	Steffi Graf	89.3%
Match win %	Grand Slams	Boris Becker	80.3%	Steffi Graf	89.7%
Grand Slam appearances		Philipp Kohlschreiber	68	Angelique Kerber	61
Youngest title winner		Boris Becker	17y 6m	Anke Huber	15y 8m
Oldest title winner		Tommy Haas	35y 6m	**Tatjana Maria**	37y 10m

=== Doubles ===
Record		Men		Women	
Record		Player	Record	Player	Record
Titles (Finals)	Overall	Karl Meiler	17 (24)	Claudia Kohde-Kilsch	25 (64)
Titles (Finals)	Grand Slams	**Kevin Krawietz**	2 (4)	Claudia Kohde-Kilsch	2 (8)
Titles (Finals)	Australian Open	David Prinosil	0 (1)	Claudia Kohde-Kilsch	0 (3)
Titles (Finals)	French Open	**Krawietz**, Mies	2 (2)	Graf, Kohde-Kilsch	0 (3)
Titles (Finals)	Wimbledon	Petzschner, Stich	1 (1)	Graf, Kohde-Kilsch	1 (1)
Titles (Finals)	US Open	Philipp Petzschner	1 (1)	Laura Siegemund	1 (2)
Titles (Finals)	ATP / WTA Finals	**Krawietz**, **Pütz**	1 (1)	Laura Siegemund	1 (1)
Titles (Finals)	Olympics	Becker, Stich	1 (1)	–	–
Matches won (pld)	Overall	**Kevin Krawietz**	**301 (479)**	Claudia Kohde-Kilsch	438 (613)
Matches won (pld)	Grand Slams	**Kevin Krawietz**	74 (105)	Claudia Kohde-Kilsch	110 (150)
Matches won (pld)	Australian Open	David Prinosil	15 (24)	Anna-Lena Grönefeld	27 (40)
Matches won (pld)	French Open	**Kevin Krawietz**	22 (28)	Claudia Kohde-Kilsch	37 (50)
Matches won (pld)	Wimbledon	Philipp Petzschner	25 (33)	Anna-Lena Grönefeld	34 (47)
Matches won (pld)	US Open	**Kevin Krawietz**	21 (30)	Claudia Kohde-Kilsch	26 (33)
Matches won (pld)	ATP / WTA Finals	**Kevin Krawietz**	**11 (21)**	Claudia Kohde-Kilsch	11 (17)
Matches won (pld)	Olympics	David Prinosil	6 (8)	Steffi Graf	2 (4)
Matches won (pld)	Davis / BJK Cup	**Tim Pütz**	23 (25)	Helga Masthoff	14 (21)

== Team competitions ==
=== Finals ===
Competition	Titles		Runner-ups	
Davis Cup	3	1988, 1989, 1993	2	1970, 1985
BJK Cup (Fed Cup)	2	1987, 1992	5	1966, 1970, 1982, 1983, 2014
United Cup	1	2024	–	
World Team Cup	5	1989, 1994, 1998, 2005, 2011	3	1993, 2006, 2009
Hopman Cup	2	1993, 1995	3	1994, 2018, 2019

=== Timeline ===
Davis Cup, Billie Jean King Cup (formerly Fed Cup) and United Cup results since 1981

	81	82	83	84	85	86	87	88	89	90	91	92	93	94	95	96	97	98	99
Davis Cup	1R	1R	Z1	1R	F	1R	1R	**W**	**W**	QF	SF	1R	**W**	SF	SF	QF	1R	QF	1R
Fed Cup	QF	F	F	QF	1R	SF	**W**	SF	QF	2R	SF	**W**	1R	SF	SF	1R	1R	1R	PO

	00	01	02	03	04	05	06	07	08	09	10	11	12	13	14	15	16	17	18	19
Davis Cup	QF	QF	1R	1R	PO	PO	1R	SF	QF	QF	1R	QF	1R	1R	QF	1R	1R	1R	QF	QF
Fed Cup	RR	RR	QF	1R	1R	PO	1R	PO	1R	PO	1R	PO	1R	PO	F	SF	1R	1R	SF	1R

	20-21	22	23	24	25	26
Davis Cup	SF	QF	QR	SF	SF	QF
BJK Cup	RR	QR	RR	1R	QR	Z1
United Cup	not held		RR	**W**	QF	RR

== See also ==
- German Tennis Federation
- Germany Davis Cup team
- Germany Billie Jean King Cup team
- Sport in Germany

== Sources ==
- "Win/Loss Index". ATP Tour.
- "Rankings - Singles". ATP Tour.
- "Press Center". WTA Tennis.
- Further sources: ITF, Ultimate Tennis Statistics, Matchstat, Tennis Abstract
