= Germany Billie Jean King Cup team =

German national women's tennis team

Germany
- Captain: Torben Beltz
- ITF ranking: 20 (13 April 2026)
- Colors: black & white
- First year: 1963
- Years played: 61
- Ties played (W–L): 168 (100–68)
- Years in World Group: 52 (74–53)
- Titles: 2 (1987, 1992)
- Runners-up: 5 (1966, 1970, 1982, 1983, 2014)
- Most total wins: Helga Masthoff (38–18)
- Most singles wins: Anke Huber (24–9)
- Most doubles wins: Helga Masthoff (15–8)
- Most ties played: Helga Masthoff (33)
- Most years played: Anna-Lena Grönefeld (14)

The Germany women's national tennis team represents Germany in Billie Jean King Cup tennis competition and are governed by Deutscher Tennis Bund.

== Current team ==
Players who represented Germany at the 2026 Billie Jean King Cup Europe/Africa Zone Group I
Name	Age	First year	Ties	Win–loss overall			Rankings	
Name	Age	First year	Ties	Sgl	Dbl	Total	Sgl	Dbl
Ella Seidel	21	2025	6	3–3	0–1	3–4	85	–
Noma Noha Akugue	22	2026	4	3–1	0–2	3–3	192	231
Tessa Brockmann	20	2026	2	0–0	0–2	0–2	277	353
Eva Bennemann	18	–	0	0–0	0–0	0–0	335	566
Nastasja Schunk	22	2021	2	0–0	0–2	0–2	364	543

Statistics correct as of 12 April 2026.

== History ==
Germany competed in its first Fed Cup in 1963. They won the Cup in 1987 and 1992, and finished as runners-up five times.

=== Finals ===
Result	Year	Venue	Surface	GER singles players	Opponent team	Opp. singles players	Score
Loss	1966	Turin, Italy	Clay	Helga Masthoff; Edda Buding	United States	Billie Jean King; Julie Heldman	0–3
Loss	1970	Freiburg, West Germany	Clay	Helga Masthoff; Helga Hösl	Australia	Karen Krantzcke; Judy Dalton	0–3
Loss	1982	Santa Clara, United States	Hard	Claudia Kohde-Kilsch; Bettina Bunge	United States	Chris Evert; Martina Navratilova	0–3
Loss	1983	Zürich, Switzerland	Clay	Claudia Kohde-Kilsch; Bettina Bunge	Czechoslovakia	Helena Suková; Hana Mandlíková	1–2
Win	1987	Vancouver, Canada	Hard	Steffi Graf; Claudia Kohde-Kilsch	United States	Chris Evert; Pam Shriver	2–1
Win	1992	Frankfurt, Germany	Clay	Steffi Graf; Anke Huber	Spain	Arantxa Sánchez Vicario; Conchita Martínez	2–1
Loss	2014	Prague, Czech Republic	Hard (i)	Angelique Kerber; Andrea Petkovic	Czech Republic	Petra Kvitová; Lucie Šafářová	1–3

== Players ==
Year	Team				
1963	Edda Buding	Margot Dittmeyer	Renate Ostermann		
1964	Helga Hösl	Heide Schildknecht			
1965	Helga Masthoff	Heide Schildknecht			
1966	Helga Hösl	Edda Buding	Helga Masthoff		
1967	Helga Hösl	Edda Buding	Helga Masthoff		
1969	Helga Masthoff	Almut Sturm	Heide Schildknecht		
1970	Helga Hösl	Katja Ebbinghaus	Helga Masthoff		
1972	Katja Ebbinghaus	Helga Masthoff	Heide Schildknecht		
1973	Katja Ebbinghaus	Helga Masthoff	Heide Schildknecht		
1974	Helga Hösl	Katja Ebbinghaus	Helga Masthoff		
1975	Katja Ebbinghaus	Helga Masthoff			
1976	Helga Masthoff	Iris Riedel	Heidi Eisterlehner		
1977	Katja Ebbinghaus	Helga Masthoff			
1978	Katja Ebbinghaus	Sylvia Hanika	Heidi Eisterlehner		
1979	Katja Ebbinghaus	Iris Riedel	Sylvia Hanika		
1980	Sylvia Hanika	Bettina Bunge			
1981	Iris Riedel	Bettina Bunge			
1982	Claudia Kohde-Kilsch	Eva Pfaff	Bettina Bunge		
1983	Claudia Kohde-Kilsch	Eva Pfaff	Bettina Bunge	Petra Keppeler	
1984	Sylvia Hanika	Myriam Schropp	Petra Keppeler		
1985	Andrea Betzner	Myriam Schropp	Petra Keppeler		
1986	Steffi Graf	Claudia Porwik	Claudia Kohde-Kilsch	Bettina Bunge	
1987	Steffi Graf	Claudia Kohde-Kilsch	Silke Meier	Bettina Bunge	
1988	Sylvia Hanika	Claudia Kohde-Kilsch	Eva Pfaff	Isabel Cueto	
1989	Steffi Graf	Claudia Kohde-Kilsch	Isabel Cueto	Bettina Bunge	
1990	Anke Huber	Claudia Porwik	Wiltrud Probst	Isabel Cueto	
1991	Anke Huber	Barbara Rittner	Steffi Graf	Sabine Hack	
1992	Anke Huber	Barbara Rittner	Steffi Graf	Sabine Hack	
1993	Anke Huber	Barbara Rittner	Steffi Graf	Sabine Hack	
1994	Anke Huber	Barbara Rittner	Christina Singer	Sabine Hack	
1995	Anke Huber	Barbara Rittner	Meike Babel	Sabine Hack	
1995	Anke Huber	Claudia Porwik	Sabine Hack		
1996	Anke Huber	Christina Singer	Steffi Graf	Sabine Hack	
1997	Barbara Rittner	Elena Pampoulova	Marlene Weingärtner		
1997	Anke Huber	Meike Babel			
1998	Wiltrud Probst	Andrea Glass	Jana Kandarr		
1998	Anke Huber	Meike Babel	Andrea Glass	Jana Kandarr	
1999	Andrea Glass	Elena Pampoulova	Jana Kandarr		
2000	Barbara Rittner	Anke Huber	Andrea Glass		
2001	Anke Huber	Barbara Rittner	Andrea Glass	Bianka Lamade	
2001	Barbara Rittner	Bianka Lamade	Martina Müller	Scarlett Werner	
2002	Marlene Weingärtner	Barbara Rittner	Bianka Lamade	Martina Müller	
2002	Martina Müller	Barbara Rittner	Bianka Lamade	Anca Barna	
2003	Anca Barna	Marlene Weingärtner	Barbara Rittner	Martina Müller	
2003	Anca Barna	Barbara Rittner	Angelika Rösch	Vanessa Henke	
2004	Marlene Weingärtner	Barbara Rittner	Anna-Lena Grönefeld	Julia Schruff	
2004	Jasmin Wöhr	Barbara Rittner	Anna-Lena Grönefeld	Julia Schruff	
2005	Anna-Lena Grönefeld	Julia Schruff	Anca Barna	Sandra Klösel	
2005	Anna-Lena Grönefeld	Julia Schruff	Sandra Klösel	Angelique Kerber	
2006	Anna-Lena Grönefeld	Julia Schruff	Martina Müller	Jasmin Wöhr	
2006	Jasmin Wöhr	Kathrin Wörle	Kristina Barrois	Tatjana Maria	
2007	Anna-Lena Grönefeld	Sandra Klösel	Tatjana Maria	Andrea Petkovic	
2007	Angelique Kerber	Tatjana Maria	Andrea Petkovic	Anna-Lena Grönefeld	
2008	Tatjana Maria	Julia Görges	Sabine Lisicki	Anna-Lena Grönefeld	
2008	Martina Müller	Angelique Kerber	Sabine Lisicki	Jasmin Wöhr	
2009	Sabine Lisicki	Anna-Lena Grönefeld	Kristina Barrois	Tatjana Maria	
2009	Sabine Lisicki	Anna-Lena Grönefeld	Kristina Barrois	Tatjana Maria	
2010	Anna-Lena Grönefeld	Andrea Petkovic	Kristina Barrois	Tatjana Maria	
2010	Andrea Petkovic	Julia Görges	Tatjana Maria	Kristina Barrois	
2011	Andrea Petkovic	Julia Görges	Tatjana Maria	Anna-Lena Grönefeld	
2011	Andrea Petkovic	Julia Görges	Sabine Lisicki	Anna-Lena Grönefeld	
2012	Sabine Lisicki	Julia Görges	Angelique Kerber	Anna-Lena Grönefeld	
2012	Andrea Petkovic	Angelique Kerber	Julia Görges	Anna-Lena Grönefeld	
2013	Julia Görges	Sabine Lisicki	Anna-Lena Grönefeld	Annika Beck	
2013	Angelique Kerber	Mona Barthel	Sabine Lisicki	Anna-Lena Grönefeld	
2014	Angelique Kerber	Andrea Petkovic	Julia Görges	Anna-Lena Grönefeld	
2014	Angelique Kerber	Andrea Petkovic	Julia Görges	Anna-Lena Grönefeld	
2014	Angelique Kerber	Andrea Petkovic	Sabine Lisicki	Julia Görges	
2015	Angelique Kerber	Andrea Petkovic	Sabine Lisicki	Julia Görges	
2015	Angelique Kerber	Andrea Petkovic	Sabine Lisicki	Julia Görges	
2016	Angelique Kerber	Andrea Petkovic	Julia Görges	Annika Beck	
2016	Angelique Kerber	Andrea Petkovic	Annika Beck	Anna-Lena Grönefeld	
2017	Laura Siegemund	Andrea Petkovic	Julia Görges	Carina Witthöft	
2017	Angelique Kerber	Laura Siegemund	Julia Görges	Carina Witthöft	
2018	Tatjana Maria	Antonia Lottner	Anna-Lena Friedsam	Anna-Lena Grönefeld	
2018	Julia Görges	Angelique Kerber	Tatjana Maria	Anna-Lena Grönefeld	
2019	Tatjana Maria	Andrea Petkovic	Laura Siegemund	Anna-Lena Grönefeld	
2019	Julia Görges	Andrea Petkovic	Mona Barthel	Anna-Lena Grönefeld	
2020	Laura Siegemund	Tatjana Maria	Anna-Lena Friedsam	Antonia Lottner	
2021	Angelique Kerber	Andrea Petkovic	Jule Niemeier	Anna-Lena Friedsam	Nastasja Schunk
2022	Angelique Kerber	Jule Niemeier	Anna-Lena Friedsam	Laura Siegemund	
2022	Jule Niemeier	Eva Lys	Anna-Lena Friedsam	Laura Siegemund	
2023	Tatjana Maria	Jule Niemeier	Anna-Lena Friedsam	Laura Siegemund	Eva Lys
2023	Tatjana Maria	Laura Siegemund	Anna-Lena Friedsam	Eva Lys	Jule Niemeier
2024	Tatjana Maria	Laura Siegemund	Eva Lys	Anna-Lena Friedsam	Angelique Kerber
2024	Laura Siegemund	Jule Niemeier	Tatjana Maria	Eva Lys	Anna-Lena Friedsam
2025	Eva Lys	Tatjana Maria	Laura Siegemund	Jule Niemeier	Anna-Lena Friedsam
2025	Eva Lys	Ella Seidel	Anna-Lena Friedsam	Jule Niemeier	Tessa Brockmann
2026	Ella Seidel	Noma Noha Akugue	Tessa Brockmann	Eva Bennemann	Nastasja Schunk

=== Player records ===
Most total wins
#	Player	Years	Win–loss				Ties played	Years played
#	Player	Years	Singles	Doubles	Total	Win %	Ties played	Years played
1	Helga Masthoff	1965–1977	23–10	15–8	38–18	68%	33	11
2	Anke Huber	1990–2001	24–9	5–7	29–16	64%	26	11
3	Steffi Graf	1986–1996	20–2	8–2	28–4	88%	20	7
3	Claudia Kohde-Kilsch	1982–1989	17–8	11–4	28–12	70%	25	6
5	Bettina Bunge	1980–1989	16–3	11–6	27–9	75%	23	7
6	Anna-Lena Grönefeld	2004–2019	11–7	9–11	20–18	53%	23	14
7	Katja Ebbinghaus	1970–1979	10–2	9–5	19–7	73%	21	8
7	Barbara Rittner	1991–2004	9–8	10–13	19–21	48%	29	11
9	Sylvia Hanika	1978–1988	10–5	7–6	17–11	61%	15	5
10	Andrea Petkovic	2007–2021	13–11	2–4	15–15	50%	18	10

== Results ==
=== 1963–1969 ===
Year	Competition	Date	Location	Opponent	Score	Result
1963	World Group, 1st round	17 June	London (GBR)	France	1–2	Lost
1964	World Group, 2nd round	2 September	Philadelphia (USA)	Italy	3–0	Won
1964	World Group, Quarterfinal	3 September	Philadelphia (USA)	France	1–2	Lost
1965	World Group, 1st round	15 January	Melbourne (AUS)	Italy	1–2	Lost
1966	World Group, 2nd round	12 May	Turin (ITA)	Argentina	3–0	Won
1966	World Group, Quarterfinal	13 May	Turin (ITA)	Italy	2–1	Won
1966	World Group, Semifinal	14 May	Turin (ITA)	Australia	2–1	Won
1966	World Group, Final	15 May	Turin (ITA)	United States	0–3	Lost
1967	World Group, 2nd round	8 June	Berlin (FRG)	Denmark	3–0	Won
1967	World Group, Quarterfinal	9 June	Berlin (FRG)	Canada	3–0	Won
1967	World Group, Semifinal	10 June	Berlin (FRG)	United States	0–3	Lost
1968	World Group, 2nd round	23 May	Paris (FRA)	Bulgaria	W/O	Lost
1969	World Group, 1st round	19 May	Athens (GRE)	Brazil	W/O	Won
1969	World Group, 2nd round	22 May	Athens (GRE)	Canada	3–0	Won
1969	World Group, Quarterfinal	23 May	Athens (GRE)	Great Britain	1–2	Lost

=== 1970–1979 ===
Year	Competition	Date	Location	Opponent	Score	Result
1970	World Group, 2nd round	20 May	Freiburg (FRG)	Switzerland	3–0	Won
1970	World Group, Quarterfinal	22 May	Freiburg (FRG)	France	3–0	Won
1970	World Group, Semifinal	23 May	Freiburg (FRG)	United States	2–1	Won
1970	World Group, Final	24 May	Freiburg (FRG)	Australia	0–3	Lost
1972	World Group, 1st round	20 March	Johannesburg (RSA)	Greece	3–0	Won
1972	World Group, 2nd round	22 March	Johannesburg (RSA)	Ireland	2–1	Won
1972	World Group, Quarterfinal	23 March	Johannesburg (RSA)	Great Britain	1–2	Lost
1973	World Group, 1st round	30 April	Bad Homburg (FRG)	Chile	W/O	Won
1973	World Group, 2nd round	2 May	Bad Homburg (FRG)	Spain	3–0	Won
1973	World Group, Quarterfinal	4 May	Bad Homburg (FRG)	United States	3–0	Won
1973	World Group, Semifinal	5 May	Bad Homburg (FRG)	Australia	0–3	Lost
1974	World Group, 1st round	May	Naples (ITA)	Canada	3–0	Won
1974	World Group, 2nd round	May	Naples (ITA)	Spain	2–0	Won
1974	World Group, Quarterfinal	May	Naples (ITA)	Romania	3–0	Won
1974	World Group, Semifinal	May	Naples (ITA)	United States	1–2	Lost
1975	World Group, 1st round	May	Aix-en-Provence (FRA)	Denmark	2–0	Won
1975	World Group, 2nd round	May	Aix-en-Provence (FRA)	Argentina	2–1	Won
1975	World Group, Quarterfinal	May	Aix-en-Provence (FRA)	Czechoslovakia	1–2	Lost
1976	World Group, 1st round	August	Philadelphia (USA)	Mexico	3–0	Won
1976	World Group, 2nd round	August	Philadelphia (USA)	Italy	3–0	Won
1976	World Group, Quarterfinal	August	Philadelphia (USA)	Australia	0–3	Lost
1977	World Group, 1st round	June	Eastbourne (GBR)	Spain	3–0	Won
1977	World Group, 2nd round	June	Eastbourne (GBR)	Canada	3–0	Won
1977	World Group, Quarterfinal	June	Eastbourne (GBR)	Australia	1–2	Lost
1978	World Group, 1st round	November	Melbourne (AUS)	Brazil	3–0	Won
1978	World Group, 2nd round	November	Melbourne (AUS)	Great Britain	1–2	Lost
1979	World Group, 1st round	April	Madrid (ESP)	South Korea	3–0	Won
1979	World Group, 2nd round	May	Madrid (ESP)	United States	0–3	Lost

=== 1980–1989 ===
Year	Competition	Date	Location	Opponent	Score	Result
1980	World Group, 1st round	May	Berlin (FRG)	Austria	3–0	Won
1980	World Group, 2nd round	May	Berlin (FRG)	Spain	2–1	Won
1980	World Group, Quarterfinal	May	Berlin (FRG)	Great Britain	3–0	Won
1980	World Group, Semifinal	May	Berlin (FRG)	Australia	1–2	Lost
1981	World Group, 1st round	November	Tokyo (JPN)	Japan	3–0	Won
1981	World Group, 2nd round	November	Tokyo (JPN)	Brazil	2–0	Won
1981	World Group, Quarterfinal	November	Tokyo (JPN)	Switzerland	1–2	Lost
1982	World Group, 1st round	July	Santa Clara (USA)	Portugal	3–0	Won
1982	World Group, 2nd round	July	Santa Clara (USA)	China	3–0	Won
1982	World Group, Quarterfinal	July	Santa Clara (USA)	Switzerland	3–0	Won
1982	World Group, Semifinal	July	Santa Clara (USA)	Australia	3–0	Won
1982	World Group, Final	July	Santa Clara (USA)	United States	0–3	Lost
1983	World Group, 1st round	July	Zürich (SUI)	Spain	3–0	Won
1983	World Group, 2nd round	July	Zürich (SUI)	Japan	3–0	Won
1983	World Group, Quarterfinal	July	Zürich (SUI)	Great Britain	2–1	Won
1983	World Group, Semifinal	July	Zürich (SUI)	Switzerland	3–0	Won
1983	World Group, Final	July	Zürich (SUI)	Czechoslovakia	1–2	Lost
1984	World Group, 1st round	July	São Paulo (BRA)	China	3–0	Won
1984	World Group, 2nd round	July	São Paulo (BRA)	Sweden	2–1	Won
1984	World Group, Quarterfinal	July	São Paulo (BRA)	Australia	1–2	Lost
1985	World Group, 1st round	October	Nagoya (JPN)	Great Britain	0–3	Lost
1985	Consolation 2nd round	October	Nagoya (JPN)	Greece	3–0	Won
1985	Consolation Quarterfinal	October	Nagoya (JPN)	Hong Kong	2–1	Won
1985	Consolation Semifinal	October	Nagoya (JPN)	Soviet Union	0–3	Lost
1986	World Group, 1st round	July	Prague (TCH)	Belgium	3–0	Won
1986	World Group, 2nd round	July	Prague (TCH)	Brazil	2–1	Won
1986	World Group, Quarterfinal	July	Prague (TCH)	Bulgaria	2–1	Won
1986	World Group, Semifinal	July	Prague (TCH)	United States	0–3	Lost
1987	World Group, 1st round	July	Vancouver (CAN)	Hong Kong	3–0	Won
1987	World Group, 2nd round	July	Vancouver (CAN)	South Korea	3–0	Won
1987	World Group, Quarterfinal	July	Vancouver (CAN)	Argentina	2–1	Won
1987	World Group, Semifinal	August	Vancouver (CAN)	Czechoslovakia	2–1	Won
1987	World Group, Final	August	Vancouver (CAN)	United States	2–1	Won
1988	World Group, 1st round	December	Melbourne (AUS)	Mexico	3–0	Won
1988	World Group, 2nd round	December	Melbourne (AUS)	France	3–0	Won
1988	World Group, Quarterfinal	December	Melbourne (AUS)	Australia	2–1	Won
1988	World Group, Semifinal	December	Melbourne (AUS)	Soviet Union	1–2	Lost
1989	World Group, 1st round	October	Tokyo (JPN)	Finland	3–0	Won
1989	World Group, 2nd round	October	Tokyo (JPN)	Japan	3–0	Won
1989	World Group, Quarterfinal	October	Tokyo (JPN)	Czechoslovakia	1–2	Lost

=== 1990–1999 ===
Year	Competition	Date	Location	Opponent	Score	Result
1990	World Group, 1st round	July	Atlanta (USA)	Argentina	2–1	Won
1990	World Group, 2nd round	July	Atlanta (USA)	Netherlands	1–2	Lost
1991	World Group, 1st round	23 July	Nottingham (GBR)	Greece	3–0	Won
1991	World Group, 2nd round	24 July	Nottingham (GBR)	Canada	2–1	Won
1991	World Group, Quarterfinal	26 July	Nottingham (GBR)	Italy	2–1	Won
1991	World Group, Semifinal	27 July	Nottingham (GBR)	Spain	0–3	Lost
1992	World Group, 1st round	13 July	Frankfurt (GER)	New Zealand	3–0	Won
1992	World Group, 2nd round	15 July	Frankfurt (GER)	Netherlands	2–1	Won
1992	World Group, Quarterfinal	16 July	Frankfurt (GER)	Poland	3–0	Won
1992	World Group, Semifinal	18 July	Frankfurt (GER)	United States	2–1	Won
1992	World Group, Final	19 July	Frankfurt (GER)	Spain	2–1	Won
1993	World Group, 1st round	20 July	Frankfurt (GER)	Australia	1–2	Lost
1993	World Group, Play-off	21 July	Frankfurt (GER)	Austria	2–1	Won
1994	World Group, 1st round	18 July	Frankfurt (GER)	Colombia	3–0	Won
1994	World Group, 2nd round	20 July	Frankfurt (GER)	Slovakia	2–1	Won
1994	World Group, Quarterfinal	22 July	Frankfurt (GER)	South Africa	3–0	Won
1994	World Group, Semifinal	23 July	Frankfurt (GER)	Spain	1–2	Lost
1995	World Group, 1st round	22–23 April	Freiburg (GER)	Japan	4–1	Won
1995	World Group, Semifinal	22–23 July	Santander (ESP)	Spain	2–3	Lost
1996	World Group, 1st round	27–28 April	Tokyo (JPN)	Japan	2–3	Lost
1996	World Group, Play-off	13–14 July	Pörtschach (AUT)	Austria	4–1	Won
1997	World Group, 1st round	1–2 March	Mannheim (GER)	Czech Republic	2–3	Lost
1997	World Group, Play-off	12–13 July	Frankfurt (GER)	Croatia	3–2	Won
1998	World Group, 1st round	18–19 April	Saarbrücken (GER)	Spain	2–3	Lost
1998	World Group, Play-off	25–26 July	Moscow (RUS)	Russia	1–4	Lost
1999	World Group II, 1st round	24–25 April	Hamburg (GER)	Japan	3–2	Won

=== 2000–2009 ===
Year	Competition	Date	Location	Opponent	Score	Result
2000	World Group, Round robin	27 April	Bari (ITA)	Croatia	2–1	Won
2000	World Group, Round robin	29 April	Bari (ITA)	Spain	1–2	Lost
2000	World Group, Round robin	30 April	Bari (ITA)	Italy	2–1	Won
2001	World Group, Play-off	21–22 July	Hamburg (GER)	Argentina	1–4	Lost
2001	World Group, Round robin	7 November	Madrid (ESP)	Belgium	0–3	Lost
2001	World Group, Round robin	8 November	Madrid (ESP)	Australia	3–0	Won
2001	World Group, Round robin	9 November	Madrid (ESP)	Spain	1–2	Lost
2002	World Group, 1st round	27–28 April	Dresden (GER)	Russia	3–2	Won
2002	World Group, Quarterfinal	20–21 July	Mallorca (ESP)	Spain	0–5	Lost
2003	World Group, 1st round	26–27 April	Ettenheim (GER)	Slovakia	2–3	Lost
2003	World Group, Play-off	19–20 July	Jakarta (INA)	Indonesia	3–2	Won
2004	World Group, 1st round	24–25 April	Amiens (FRA)	France	0–5	Lost
2004	World Group, Play-off	10–11 July	Illichivsk (UKR)	Ukraine	3–2	Won
2005	World Group II, 1st round	23–24 April	Essen (GER)	Indonesia	4–1	Won
2005	World Group, Play-off	9–10 July	Bol (CRO)	Croatia	4–1	Won
2006	World Group, 1st round	22–23 April	Ettenheim (GER)	United States	2–3	Lost
2006	World Group, Play-off	15–16 July	Beijing (CHN)	China	1–4	Lost
2007	World Group II, 1st round	21–22 April	Fürth (GER)	Croatia	4–1	Won
2007	World Group, Play-off	14–15 July	Toyota (JPN)	Japan	3–2	Won
2008	World Group, 1st round	2–3 February	La Jolla (USA)	United States	1–4	Lost
2008	World Group, Play-off	26–27 April	Buenos Aires (ARG)	Argentina	2–3	Lost
2009	World Group II, 1st round	7–8 February	Zürich (SUI)	Switzerland	3–2	Won
2009	World Group, Play-off	25–26 April	Frankfurt (GER)	China	3–2	Won

=== 2010–2019 ===
Year	Competition	Date	Location	Opponent	Score	Result
2010	World Group, 1st round	6–7 February	Brno (CZE)	Czech Republic	2–3	Lost
2010	World Group, Play-off	24–25 April	Frankfurt (GER)	France	2–3	Lost
2011	World Group II, 1st round	5–6 February	Maribor (SLO)	Slovenia	4–1	Won
2011	World Group, Play-off	16–17 April	Stuttgart (GER)	United States	5–0	Won
2012	World Group, 1st round	4–5 February	Stuttgart (GER)	Czech Republic	1–4	Lost
2012	World Group, Play-off	21–22 April	Stuttgart (GER)	Australia	2–3	Lost
2013	World Group II, 1st round	9–10 February	Limoges (FRA)	France	3–1	Won
2013	World Group, Play-off	20–21 April	Stuttgart (GER)	Serbia	3–2	Won
2014	World Group, 1st round	8–9 February	Bratislava (SVK)	Slovakia	3–1	Won
2014	World Group, Semifinal	19–20 April	Brisbane (AUS)	Australia	3–1	Won
2014	World Group, Final	8–9 November	Prague (CZE)	Czech Republic	1–3	Lost
2015	World Group, 1st round	7–8 February	Stuttgart (GER)	Australia	4–1	Won
2015	World Group, Semifinal	18–19 April	Sochi (RUS)	Russia	2–3	Lost
2016	World Group, 1st round	6–7 February	Leipzig (GER)	Switzerland	2–3	Lost
2016	World Group, Play-off	16–17 April	Cluj-Napoca (ROU)	Romania	4–1	Won
2017	World Group, 1st round	12–13 February	Maui (USA)	United States	0–4	Lost
2017	World Group, Play-off	22–23 April	Stuttgart (GER)	Ukraine	3–2	Won
2018	World Group, 1st round	10–11 February	Minsk (BLR)	Belarus	3–2	Won
2018	World Group, Semifinal	21–22 April	Stuttgart (GER)	Czech Republic	1–4	Lost
2019	World Group, 1st round	9–10 February	Braunschweig (GER)	Belarus	0–4	Lost
2019	World Group, Play-off	19–20 April	Riga (LAT)	Latvia	3–1	Won

=== 2020– ===
Year	Competition	Date	Location	Opponent	Score	Result
2020	Qualifying round	7–8 February	Florianópolis (BRA)	Brazil	4–0	Won
2021	Finals, Group D	1 November	Prague (CZE)	Czech Republic	1–2	Lost
2021	Finals, Group D	2 November	Prague (CZE)	Switzerland	0–3	Lost
2022	Qualifying round	15–16 April	Astana (KAZ)	Kazakhstan	1–3	Lost
2022	Play-offs	11–12 November	Rijeka (CRO)	Croatia	3–1	Won
2023	Qualifying round	14–15 April	Stuttgart (GER)	Brazil	3–1	Won
2023	Finals, Group D	9 November	Seville (ESP)	Italy	0–3	Lost
2023	Finals, Group D	10 November	Seville (ESP)	France	0–3	Lost
2024	Qualifying round	12–13 April	São Paulo (BRA)	Brazil	3–1	Won
2024	Finals, 1st round	15 November	Seville (ESP)	Great Britain	0–2	Lost
2025	Qualifying round	10 April	The Hague (NED)	Netherlands	0–3	Lost
2025	Qualifying round	11 April	The Hague (NED)	Great Britain	1–2	Lost
2025	Play-offs	14 November	Ismaning (GER)	Turkey	1–2	Lost
2025	Play-offs	16 November	Ismaning (GER)	Belgium	0–2	Lost
2026	Europe/Africa Group I	7 April	Oeiras (POR)	Portugal	1–2	Lost
2026	Europe/Africa Group I	8 April	Oeiras (POR)	Sweden	1–2	Lost
2026	Europe/Africa Group I	9 April	Oeiras (POR)	Denmark	2–0	Won
2026	Europe/Africa Group I	11 April	Oeiras (POR)	Lithuania	1–2	Lost

== See also ==
- Billie Jean King Cup
- Germany Davis Cup team
- Germany at the Hopman Cup
- German Tennis Federation
- Tennis in Germany
