= 1967 Federation Cup (tennis) =

International women's tennis competition

Details
- Duration: 6 – 11 June
- Edition: 5th

Champion
- Winning nation: United States

The 1967 Federation Cup was the fifth edition of what is now known as the Billie Jean King Cup. 17 nations participated in the tournament, which was held at the Blau-Weiss Tennis Club in West Berlin from 6–11 June. United States defended their title, defeating Great Britain in the final.

== Participating teams ==
Participating Teams
| Australia | Belgium | Canada | Czechoslovakia | Denmark | France |
| Great Britain | Italy | Netherlands | Norway | Poland | Rhodesia |
| South Africa | Switzerland | Sweden | United States | West Germany | |

== Draw ==
All ties were played at the Blau-Weiss Tennis Club in West Berlin on clay courts.

First Round; 6 June
Italy | 3
Belgium | 0

Second Round; 7–8 June
Australia
Czechoslovakia | w/o
France
Poland | w/o
Great Britain | 3
Sweden | 0
Netherlands | 0
Italy | 3
Switzerland | 1
Canada | 2
Denmark | 0
West Germany | 3
Norway | 0
South Africa | 3
Rhodesia | 0
United States | 3

Quarterfinals; 9 June
Australia | 2
France | 1
Great Britain | 2
Italy | 1
Canada | 0
West Germany | 3
South Africa | 0
United States | 3

Semifinals; 10 June
Australia | 0
Great Britain | 3
West Germany | 0
United States | 3

Final; 11 June
Great Britain | 0
United States | 3

=== First round ===
Italy vs. Belgium

Italy
3
Blau-Weiss Tennis Club, West Berlin
6 June 1967
Clay

Belgium
0

| | | | 1 | 2 | 3 |
|---|---|---|---|---|---|
| 1 | (Italy) (Belgium) | Lea Pericoli; Christiane Mercelis | 6; 2 | 6; 1 |
| 2 | (Italy) (Belgium) | Maria Teresa Riedl; Ingrid Loeys | 6; 4 | 2; 6 | 6; 0 |
| 3 | (Italy) (Belgium) | Silvana Lazzarino / Lea Pericoli; Ingrid Loeys / Christiane Mercelis | 6; 2 | 6; 2 |

=== Second round ===
Great Britain vs. Sweden

Great Britain
3
Blau-Weiss Tennis Club, West Berlin
7 June 1967
Clay

Sweden
0

| | | | 1 | 2 | 3 |
|---|---|---|---|---|---|
| 1 | (United Kingdom) (Sweden) | Virginia Wade; Ingrid Löfdahl | 6; 4 | 6; 8 | 6; 1 |
| 2 | (United Kingdom) (Sweden) | Ann Jones; Christina Sandberg | 6; 2 | 6; 4 |
| 3 | (United Kingdom) (Sweden) | Ann Jones / Virginia Wade; Ingrid Löfdahl / Eva Lundqvist | 2; 6 | 6; 4 | 7; 5 |

Netherlands vs. Italy

Netherlands
0
Blau-Weiss Tennis Club, West Berlin
7 June 1967
Clay

Italy
3

| | | | 1 | 2 | 3 |
|---|---|---|---|---|---|
| 1 | (Netherlands) (Italy) | Lidy Venneboer; Maria Teresa Riedl | 6; 3 | 3; 6 | 1; 6 |
| 2 | (Netherlands) (Italy) | Gertruida Groenman; Lea Pericoli | 5; 7 | 3; 6 |
| 3 | (Netherlands) (Italy) | Gertruida Groenman / Lidy Venneboer; Silvana Lazzarino / Lea Pericoli | 6; 2 | 5; 7 | 4; 6 |

Switzerland vs. Canada

Switzerland
1
Blau-Weiss Tennis Club, West Berlin
8 June 1967
Clay

Canada
2

| | | | 1 | 2 | 3 |
|---|---|---|---|---|---|
| 1 | (Switzerland) (Canada) | Anne-Marie Studer; Susan Butt | 4; 6 | 1; 6 |
| 2 | (Switzerland) (Canada) | Silvia Gubler; Faye Urban | 6; 2 | 6; 3 |
| 3 | (Switzerland) (Canada) | Silvia Gubler / Anne-Marie Studer; Vicki Berner / Faye Urban | 3; 6 | 1; 6 |

Denmark vs. West Germany

Denmark
0
Blau-Weiss Tennis Club, West Berlin
8 June 1967
Clay

West Germany
3

| | | | 1 | 2 | 3 |
|---|---|---|---|---|---|
| 1 | (Denmark) (West Germany) | Milly Vagn-Nielsen; Helga Hösl | 1; 6 | 0; 6 |
| 2 | (Denmark) (West Germany) | Pia Balling; Helga Niessen | 1; 6 | 1; 6 |
| 3 | (Denmark) (West Germany) | Pia Balling / Lise Hahn-Evans; Edda Buding / Helga Hösl | 0; 6 | 1; 6 |

Norway vs. South Africa

Norway
0
Blau-Weiss Tennis Club, West Berlin
8 June 1967
Clay

South Africa
3

| | | | 1 | 2 | 3 |
|---|---|---|---|---|---|
| 1 | (Norway) (South Africa) | Kirsten Robsahm; Greta Delport | 4; 6 | 3; 6 |
| 2 | (Norway) (South Africa) | Ellen Grindvold; Glenda Swan | 4; 6 | 3; 6 |
| 3 | (Norway) (South Africa) | Ellen Grindvold / Kirsten Robsahm; Greta Delport / Glenda Swan | 2; 6 | 3; 6 |

Rhodesia vs. United States

Rhodesia
0
Blau-Weiss Tennis Club, West Berlin
8 June 1967
Clay

United States
3

| | | | 1 | 2 | 3 |
|---|---|---|---|---|---|
| 1 | (Rhodesia) (United States) | Patricia Walkden; Billie Jean King | 3; 6 | 6; 2 | 3; 6 |
| 2 | (Rhodesia) (United States) | Fiona Morris; Rosie Casals | 3; 6 | 4; 6 |
| 3 | (Rhodesia) (United States) | Fiona Morris / Patricia Walkden; Rosie Casals / Billie Jean King | 3; 6 | 0; 6 |

=== Quarterfinals ===
Australia vs. France

Australia
2
Blau-Weiss Tennis Club, West Berlin
9 June 1967
Clay

France
1

| | | | 1 | 2 | 3 |
|---|---|---|---|---|---|
| 1 | (Australia) (France) | Kerry Melville; Monique Salfati | 4; 6 | 6; 4 | 9; 7 |
| 2 | (Australia) (France) | Lesley Turner; Françoise Dürr | 7; 9 | 1; 6 |
| 3 | (Australia) (France) | Judy Tegart / Lesley Turner; Françoise Dürr / Janine Lieffrig | 6; 3 | 6; 3 |

Great Britain vs. Italy

Great Britain
2
Blau-Weiss Tennis Club, West Berlin
9 June 1967
Clay

Italy
1

| | | | 1 | 2 | 3 |
|---|---|---|---|---|---|
| 1 | (United Kingdom) (Italy) | Virginia Wade; Maria Teresa Riedl | 6; 1 | 8; 6 |
| 2 | (United Kingdom) (Italy) | Ann Jones; Lea Pericoli | 6; 1 | 6; 0 |
| 3 | (United Kingdom) (Italy) | Ann Jones / Virginia Wade; Silvana Lazzarino / Lea Pericoli | 5; 7 | 2; 6 |

Canada vs. West Germany

Canada
0
Blau-Weiss Tennis Club, West Berlin
9 June 1967
Clay

West Germany
3

| | | | 1 | 2 | 3 |
|---|---|---|---|---|---|
| 1 | (Canada) (West Germany) | Faye Urban; Helga Hösl | 5; 7 | 4; 6 |
| 2 | (Canada) (West Germany) | Susan Butt; Helga Niessen | 1; 6 | 1; 6 |
| 3 | (Canada) (West Germany) | Vicki Berner / Faye Urban; Edda Buding / Helga Hösl | 1; 6 | 1; 6 |

South Africa vs. United States

South Africa
0
Blau-Weiss Tennis Club, West Berlin
9 June 1967
Clay

United States
3

| | | | 1 | 2 | 3 |
|---|---|---|---|---|---|
| 1 | (South Africa) (United States) | Glenda Swan; Rosie Casals | 1; 6 | 4; 6 |
| 2 | (South Africa) (United States) | Annette Van Zyl; Billie Jean King | 2; 6 | 4; 6 |
| 3 | (South Africa) (United States) | Glenda Swan / Annette Van Zyl; Rosie Casals / Billie Jean King | 5; 7 | 4; 6 |

=== Semifinals ===
Australia vs. Great Britain

Australia
0
Blau-Weiss Tennis Club, West Berlin
10 June 1967
Clay

Great Britain
3

| | | | 1 | 2 | 3 |
|---|---|---|---|---|---|
| 1 | (Australia) (United Kingdom) | Kerry Melville; Virginia Wade | 7; 9 | 6; 4 | 2; 6 |
| 2 | (Australia) (United Kingdom) | Lesley Turner; Ann Jones | 2; 6 | 2; 6 |
| 3 | (Australia) (United Kingdom) | Judy Tegart / Lesley Turner; Ann Jones / Virginia Wade | 6; 8 | 4; 6 |

West Germany vs. United States

West Germany
0
Blau-Weiss Tennis Club, West Berlin
10 June 1967
Clay

United States
3

| | | | 1 | 2 | 3 |
|---|---|---|---|---|---|
| 1 | (West Germany) (United States) | Helga Hösl; Rosie Casals | 2; 6 | 5; 7 |
| 2 | (West Germany) (United States) | Helga Niessen; Billie Jean King | 1; 6 | 5; 7 |
| 3 | (West Germany) (United States) | Edda Buding / Helga Hösl; Rosie Casals / Billie Jean King | 4; 6 | 6; 2 | 6; 8 |

=== Final ===
Great Britain vs. United States

Great Britain
0
Blau-Weiss Tennis Club, West Berlin
11 June 1967
Clay

United States
2

| | | | 1 | 2 | 3 |
|---|---|---|---|---|---|---|
| 1 | (United Kingdom) (United States) | Virginia Wade; Rosie Casals | 7; 9 | 6; 8 |
| 2 | (United Kingdom) (United States) | Ann Jones; Billie Jean King | 3; 6 | 4; 6 |
| 3 | (United Kingdom) (United States) | Ann Jones / Virginia Wade; Rosie Casals / Billie Jean King | 8; 6 | 7; 9 | | not completed |
