= Australia Billie Jean King Cup team =

Australian women's tennis team

Australia
- Captain: Alicia Molik (since 2013)
- Nations Ranking: 1 (19 April 2022)
- Highest ranking: 1 (8 November 2021)
- Lowest ranking: 26 (11 July 2006)
- Colors: green & gold
- First year: 1963
- Years played: 58
- Ties played (W–L): 186 (132–54)
- Years in World Group: 41 (95–38)
- Titles: 7 (1964, 1965, 1968, 1970, 1971, 1973, 1974)
- Runners-up: 12 (1963, 1969, 1975, 1976, 1977, 1978, 1979, 1980, 1984, 1993, 2019, 2022)
- Most total wins: Wendy Turnbull (46–16)
- Most singles wins: Samantha Stosur (29–17)
- Most doubles wins: Wendy Turnbull (29–8)
- Best doubles team: Kerry Reid / Wendy Turnbull (11–4)
- Most ties played: Wendy Turnbull (45)
- Most years played: Rennae Stubbs (17)

The Australia Billie Jean King Cup team represents Australia in international women's tennis and is directed by Tennis Australia. The team played in the first ever tournament in 1963, and is one of four teams that has taken part in every single edition since.

The Australian national team is one of the most successful in world tennis. They are seven-time world champions and have reached a total of eighteen finals, second highest as Runners-up all-time behind United States. Between 1963 and 1980, the Australian team played in every single final except for three. However, in recent times the Australian team has had a comparative lack of success, only appearing in the World Group five times between 1995 and 2010, and never going beyond the first round. However, the team has experienced a resurgence in recent times, accumulating a 15–6 win–loss record since 2005 and returning to the World Group in 2011 and 2013. Samantha Stosur holds the record for most singles wins by an Australian in Fed Cup, while Wendy Turnbull holds the record for most doubles wins, most overall tie wins, and most ties participated in.

Alicia Molik is the current captain and has held that position since 2013. Currently, the team is No. 1 in the ITF rankings, their highest-ever rank since the inception of the rankings in 2002.

== Current team ==
Name	DOB	First	Last	Ties	Win/Loss			Ranks (Note: Most recent Year-End ranks (2015). See)	
Name	DOB	First	Last	Ties	Sin	Dou	Tot	Sin	Dou
Storm Hunter	11 August 1994	2021	2023	9	6–2	4–2	10–4	122	3
Ellen Perez	10 October 1995	2021	2023	4	0–0	1–3	1–3	363	8
Taylah Preston	27 October 2005	–	–	0	0–0	0–0	0–0	134	357
Arina Rodionova	15 December 1989	2016	2016	2	0–1	0–1	0–2	98	334
Daria Saville	5 March 1994	2016	2023	8	4–7	1–1	5–8	115	110

== Players ==
Forty-four players have represented Fed Cup for Australia since its inception in 1963. Wendy Turnbull holds the record for the most ties played, having appeared in forty-five ties during her eleven-year Fed Cup career. Rennae Stubbs is second, with forty-one ties, although she had by far competed for more years than anyone else (with seventeen) before her retirement after the team's 2011 tie against Italy. Alicia Molik, the current captain, is tenth, having played in twenty-two ties, one less than the highest active player Samantha Stosur. Turnbull took the record for most ties in 1986, taking the record from current third Dianne Balestrat. Balestrat was also the youngest person to reach twenty ties, at 23 years old. Margaret Court and Evonne Goolagong Cawley share the record of people to reach twenty ties to have the highest winning percentage, with 35–5 or 0.875%.

Stosur holds the record for most Australia Fed Cup singles wins. She had her first win in 2004 against Napaporn Tongsalee, and went on to take the record from Balestrat nine years later after defeating Romina Oprandi in 2013. Court holds the record for most prolific singles player, averaging once win for every tie she played and also accumulating a 100% singles winning percentage. Court was also the first player to accumulate ten wins for the team, having achieved the feat in 1965. Nicole Bradtke was the youngest person to achieve her tenth win, doing so in April 1995 against Radka Zrubáková while aged 22 years, 1 month. Current captain Molik is once again tenth on this factor, sharing the record with Bradtke at twelve.

Turnbull holds the record for most doubles wins, accumulating twenty-nine wins before her final tie in 1988 against West Germany, and taking this record from Kerry Melville Reid, the current third, in 1982. Turnbull and Melville Reid together also hold the record for most doubles wins as a team, with eleven. Of the players that have achieved ten doubles wins, Judy Tegart Dalton was the most prolific, averaging 0.8 wins per tie. Goolagong Cawley achieved the highest win percentage, at 86.7%. Court was once again the first player to reach ten doubles wins, doing so after beating Winnie Shaw and Virginia Wade alongside Melville Reid in 1968. Stubbs, currently second, was the youngest person to achieve ten doubles wins, at 24 years, 1 month. Of the active players, Casey Dellacqua, tenth, has the most doubles wins at seven.

Jelena Dokic was the youngest player to compete for Australia, and also the youngest person to win a match for Australia when she defeated Mariana Díaz Oliva in 1998 aged 15 years, 3 months. Rennae Stubbs, on the other hand, was the oldest player to compete and win a match, winning her last match aged 39 years, 1 month, and playing her final tie aged 39 years, 10 months.

=== Most ties played ===
#	Name	AUS career	Ties	Tot W/L
1	Wendy Turnbull	1977–1988	45	46–16
2	Rennae Stubbs	1992–2011	41	28–13
3	Dianne Balestrat	1974–1983	37	35–11
4	Elizabeth Smylie	1984–1994	31	24–13
5	**Samantha Stosur**	2003–	30	36–18
6	Kerry Melville Reid	1967–1979	29	37–10
7	Evonne Goolagong Cawley	1970–1982	26	35–5
8	Rachel McQuillan	1990–2001	23	11–21
8	Anne Minter	1981–1989	23	20–6
10	Alicia Molik	1999–2010	22	18–21

=== Most singles wins ===
#	Name	AUS career	Ties	Sin W/L	Dou W/L
1	**Samantha Stosur**	2003–	29	29–18	7–0
2	Dianne Balestrat	1974–1983	37	24–9	11–2
3	Evonne Goolagong Cawley	1970–1982	26	22–3	13–2
4	Margaret Court	1963–1971	20	20–0	15–5
4	Kerry Melville Reid	1967–1979	29	20–4	17–6
6	Wendy Turnbull	1977–1988	45	17–8	29–8
7	Anne Minter	1981–1989	23	16–6	4–0
8	Jelena Dokic	1998–2012	17	15–2	1–1
9	Nicole Pratt	1998–2007	20	14–12	1–1
10	Nicole Bradtke	1988–1996	17	12–8	6–1
10	Alicia Molik	1999–2010	22	12–15	6–6

=== Most doubles wins ===
#	Name	AUS career	Ties	Dou W/L	Sin W/L
1	Wendy Turnbull	1977–1988	45	29–8	17–8
2	Rennae Stubbs	1992–2011	41	28–10	0–3
3	Kerry Melville Reid	1967–1979	29	17–6	20–4
3	Elizabeth Smylie	1984–1994	31	17–5	7–8
5	Margaret Court	1963–1971	20	15–5	20–0
6	Evonne Goolagong Cawley	1970–1982	26	13–2	22–3
6	Casey Dellacqua	2006–2018	21	13–4	6–5
8	Judy Tegart Dalton	1965–1970	15	12–3	6–1
9	Dianne Balestrat	1974–1983	37	11–2	24–9
10	Susan Leo	1980–1983	13	9–3	2–0

=== Top ten players ===
==== Singles ====
**Player**	**Record**	**W%**	**Hardcourt**	**Clay**	**Grass**	**Carpet**
Number 1 ranked players						
Margaret Court	20–0	100%	0–0	7–0	13–0	0–0
Evonne Goolagong Cawley	22–3	88%	6–1	10–1	2–0	4–1
Number 2 ranked players						
Lesley Turner Bowrey	7–3	70%	0–0	0–2	7–1	0–0
Number 3 ranked players						
Wendy Turnbull	17–8	68%	5–0	10–6	2–2	0–0
Number 4 ranked players						
Dianne Balestrat	24–9	72.72%	2–1	15–6	5–2	2–2
Jelena Dokic	13–2	86.67%	6–1	1–1	1–0	5–0
**Samantha Stosur**	27–13	67.50%	17–9	8–2	2–0	0–2
Number 7 ranked players						
Jan O'Neill	3–0	100%	0–0	0–0	3–0	0–0
Judy Tegart Dalton	6–1	85.71%	0–0	6–1	0–0	0–0
Kerry Melville Reid	20–4	83.33%	0–0	9–3	8–1	3–0
Lesley Hunt	1–0	100%	1–0	0–0	0–0	0–0
Number 8 ranked players						
Alicia Molik	12–15	44.44%	5–4	3–9	3–1	1–1

==== Doubles ====
**Player**	**Record**	**W%**	**Hardcourt**	**Clay**	**Grass**	**Carpet**
Number 1 ranked players						
Margaret Court	15–5	75%	0–0	5–2	10–3	0–0
Rennae Stubbs	28–10	73.68%	13–2	13–4	2–0	0–4
**Samantha Stosur**	7–0	100%	6–0	1–0	0–0	0–0
Number 3 ranked players						
**Casey Dellacqua**	10–4	71.42%	9–2	1–2	0–0	0–0
Number 5 ranked players						
Ashleigh Barty	5–1	83%	4–1	0–0	1–0	0–0
Wendy Turnbull	29–8	78.38%	9–2	12–4	8–2	0–0
Elizabeth Smylie	17–5	77.27%	7–2	10–3	0–0	0–0
Number 6 ranked players						
Alicia Molik	6–6	50%	5–1	1–2	0–0	0–3
Number 10 ranked players						
Jelena Dokic	1–1	50%	0–0	1–0	0–0	0–1

*Active players in bold, statistics as of 1 February 2016.

== Results ==
Tournament	1963	1964	1965	1966	1967	1968	1969	1970	1971	1972	1973	1974	1975	1976	1977	1978	1979	1980	1981	1982	1983	1984	1985	1986	1987	1988	1989	1990	1991	1992	1993	1994	W–L
**Federation Cup**
World Group	F	**W**	**W**	SF	SF	**W**	F	**W**	**W**	SF	**W**	**W**	F	F	F	F	F	F	SF	SF	QF	F	SF	QF	QF	QF	SF	2R	2R	SF	F	2R	**92–25**
Win–loss	3–1	4–0	3–0	2–1	1–1	4–0	2–1	4–0	2–0	2–1	4–0	4–0	3–1	4–1	4–1	4–1	4–1	4–1	3–1	3–1	2–1	4–1	3–1	2–1	2–1	2–1	3–1	1–1	1–1	3–1	4–1	1–1	

Tournament	1995	1996	1997	1998	1999	2000	2001	2002	2003	2004	2005	2006	2007	2008	2009	2010	2011	2012	2013	2014	2015	W–L
**Fed Cup**
World Group	A	A	A	A	A	11th	7th	1R	1R	1R	A	A	A	A	A	A	QF	A	QF	SF	QF	**1–13**
World Group play-offs	L	A	L	A	A	NH	**W**	**W**	**W**	L	A	A	A	A	A	**W**	L	**W**	**W**	A	L	**7–5**
World Group II	**W**	L	**W**	L	L	Not Held					A	A	L	A	A	**W**	A	**W**	A	A	A	**4–4**
World Group II play-offs	A	**W**	A	**W**	**W**	Not Held					A	**W**	L	A	**W**	A	A	A	A	A	A	**8–1**
Asia/Oceania Zone Group I	A	A	A	A	A	A	A	A	A	A	2nd	**W**	A	4th	**W**	A	A	A	A	A	A	**12–2**
Win–loss	1–1	1–1	1–1	1–1	4–1	0–3	2–3	1–1	1–1	1–1	3–1	4–0	0–2	2–1	5–0	2–0	0–2	2–0	1–1	1-1	0-2	124–50
Year End Ranking								11	12	19	26	16	18	20	14	**7**	**10**	**6**	**8**	**5**	**9**	

=== Records ===
In terms of time, the longest rubber involving an Australian player was Fabiola Zuluaga's 2003, 2–6, 7–6^{(7–4)}, 8–10, defeat of Alicia Molik, which took two-hour, forty-three minutes. However, the longest rubber in terms of games was Margaret Court and Kerry Reid's 1968, 9–7, 3–6, 14–12, defeat of Winnie Shaw and Virginia Wade, which lasted fifty-one games and holds the overall Fed Cup record. This match also holds the Australian Fed Cup record of most games in a set.

The longest tie in terms of time and games was the Italy–Australia match in 2011, which lasted for ten hours and twenty-six minutes and featured a hundred and forty-nine games. The match also holds the overall Fed Cup record for most tiebreaks in a tie with five. The Australian Fed Cup record for longest tiebreak was also set in 2011, with Anastasia Rodionova's, 6–7^{(3–7)}, 6–7^{(12–14)}, loss to Olga Savchuk.

Australia was also featured in two of the five 0–2 comebacks featured since inception. The Australian team defeated Canada in the competition's first ever 0–2 comeback in 1996, while Austria beat the team three years later for the second event.

The Australian team also holds the record for longest streak of consecutive finals, from 1973 to 1980. It was during this period that they accumulated their longest tie winning streak at eleven.

==== Longest winning streak ====
Year	Competition	Date	Location	Opponent	Score	Result
1973	World Group, Second Round	2 May	Bad Homburg (FRG)	Japan	3–0	Won
1973	World Group, Quarterfinals	4 May	Bad Homburg (FRG)	Indonesia	3–0	Won
1973	World Group, Semifinals	5 May	Bad Homburg (FRG)	West Germany	3–0	Won
1973	World Group, Final	6 May	Bad Homburg (FRG)	South Africa	3–0	Won
1974	World Group, Second Round	May	Naples (ITA)	Japan	2–0	Won
1974	World Group, Quarterfinals	May	Naples (ITA)	Italy	3–0	Won
1974	World Group, Semifinals	May	Naples (ITA)	Great Britain	3–0	Won
1974	World Group, Final	May	Naples (ITA)	United States	2–1	Won
1975	World Group, Second Round	May	Aix-en-Provence (FRA)	Belgium	2–0	Won
1975	World Group, Quarterfinals	May	Aix-en-Provence (FRA)	Italy	3–0	Won
1975	World Group, Semifinals	May	Aix-en-Provence (FRA)	United States	2–1	Won
1975	World Group, Final	May	Aix-en-Provence (FRA)	Czechoslovakia	0–3	Lost

=== Finals: 19 (7 titles, 12 runners-up) ===
Outcome	Year	Venue	Surface	Team	Opponents	Opposing Team	Score
Runner-up	1963	Queen's Club, London, United Kingdom	Grass	Margaret Smith; Jan O'Neill; Lesley Turner	United States	Darlene Hard; Billie Jean Moffitt	1–2
Winner	1964	Germantown Cricket Club, Philadelphia, United States	Grass	Margaret Smith; Lesley Turner; Robyn Ebbern	United States	Billie Jean Moffitt; Nancy Richey; Karen Hantze Susman	2–1
Winner	1965	Kooyong Stadium, Melbourne, Australia	Grass	Margaret Smith; Lesley Turner; Judy Tegart	United States	Billie Jean Moffitt; Carole Caldwell Graebner	2–1
Winner	1968	Stade Roland Garros, Paris, France	Red clay	Margaret Court; Kerry Melville	Netherlands	Astrid Suurbeck; Marijke Jansen; Lidy Venneboer	3–0
Runner-up	1969	Athens Tennis Club, Athens, Greece	Red clay	Margaret Court; Kerry Melville; Judy Tegart	United States	Nancy Richey; Julie Heldman; Jane Bartkowicz	1–2
Winner	1970	Freiburg Tennis Club, Freiburg, West Germany	Red clay	Judy Tegart; Karen Krantzcke	West Germany	Helga Niessen; Helga Hösl	3–0
Winner	1971	Royal King's Park Tennis Club, Perth, Australia	Grass	Margaret Court; Evonne Goolagong; Lesley Hunt	Great Britain	Virginia Wade; Ann Jones; Winnie Shaw	3–0
Winner	1973	Bad Homburg Tennis Club, Bad Homburg, West Germany	Red clay	Evonne Goolagong; Patricia Coleman; Janet Young	South Africa	Patricia Walkden; Brenda Kirk	3–0
Winner	1974	Naples Tennis Club, Naples, Italy	Red clay	Evonne Goolagong; Dianne Fromholtz; Janet Young	United States	Julie Heldman; Jeanne Evert; Sharon Walsh	2–1
Runner-up	1975	Aixoise C.C., Aix-en-Provence, France	Red clay	Evonne Goolagong; Helen Gourlay; Dianne Fromholtz	Czechoslovakia	Martina Navratilova; Renáta Tomanová	0–3
Runner-up	1976	The Spectrum, Philadelphia, United States	Carpet (i)	Evonne Goolagong Cawley; Kerry Melville Reid; Dianne Fromholtz	United States	Billie Jean King; Rosemary Casals	1–2
Runner-up	1977	Devonshire Park, Eastbourne, United Kingdom	Grass	Kerry Melville Reid; Dianne Fromholtz; Wendy Turnbull	United States	Chris Evert; Billie Jean King; Rosemary Casals	1–2
Runner-up	1978	Kooyong Stadium, Melbourne, Australia	Grass	Kerry Melville Reid; Wendy Turnbull; Dianne Fromholtz	United States	Chris Evert; Tracy Austin; Billie Jean King	1–2
Runner-up	1979	RSHE Club Campo, Madrid, Spain	Red clay	Kerry Melville Reid; Wendy Turnbull; Dianne Fromholtz	United States	Chris Evert Lloyd; Tracy Austin; Billie Jean King; Rosemary Casals	0–3
Runner-up	1980	Rot-Weiss Tennis Club, West Berlin, West Germany	Red clay	Dianne Fromholtz; Wendy Turnbull; Susan Leo	United States	Chris Evert Lloyd; Tracy Austin; Rosemary Casals; Kathy Jordan	0–3
Runner-up	1984	Esporte Clube Pinheiros, São Paulo, Brazil	Red clay	Elizabeth Sayers; Wendy Turnbull; Anne Minter; Elizabeth Minter	Czechoslovakia	Hana Mandlíková; Helena Suková; Iva Budařová; Marcela Skuherská	1–2
Runner-up	1993	Waldstadion T.C., Frankfurt, Germany	Red clay	Nicole Provis; Michelle Jaggard-Lai; Elizabeth Smylie; Rennae Stubbs	Spain	Conchita Martínez; Arantxa Sánchez Vicario; Virginia Ruano Pascual; Cristina Torrens Valero	0–3
Runner-up	2019	Perth Arena, Perth, Australia	Hard	Ajla Tomljanović; Ashleigh Barty; Samantha Stosur	France	Kristina Mladenovic; Caroline Garcia; Pauline Parmentier	2-3
Runner-up	2022	Emirates Arena, Glasgow, United Kingdom	Hard (i)	Ajla Tomljanović; Storm Sanders; Samantha Stosur	Switzerland	Belinda Bencic; Jil Teichmann	0-2

=== Head-to-head record ===
**Player**	**Record**	**W%**	**Hard**	**Clay**	**Grass**	**Carpet**
Netherlands	8–2	80%	3–0	4–2	1–0	0–0
**Germany**	8–6	57.14%	0–4	6–2	1–0	1–0
Great Britain	7–3	70%	0–1	4–2	2–0	1–0
Switzerland	6–1	85.71%	1–0	3–1	2–0	0–0
Denmark	5–0	100%	2–0	2–0	1–0	0–0
New Zealand	5–0	100%	4–0	0–0	1–0	0–0
**France**	5–1	83.33%	0–0	2–0	3–0	0–1
**Italy**	5–1	83.33%	3–1	2–0	0–0	0–0
**Belgium**	5–3	62.5%	0–0	2–2	2–0	1–1
**United States**	5–8	38.46%	0–1	3–3	2–3	0–1
Canada	4–0	100%	1–0	2–0	1–0	0–0
Japan	4–0	100%	1–0	2–0	1–0	0–0
**South Africa**	4–0	100%	1–0	2–0	1–0	0–0
South Korea	4–0	100%	4–0	0–0	0–0	0–0
Argentina	4–1	80%	1–0	2–1	0–0	1–0
Indonesia	4–1	80%	1–1	2–0	1–0	0–0
**Russia**	4–3	57.1%	2–0	1–0	1–1	0–2
Chinese Taipei	3–0	100%	3–0	0–0	0–0	0–0
**Czech Republic**	3–5	37.5%	0–2	3–3	0–0	0–0
**Spain**	3–7	30%	3–3	0–4	0–0	0–0

**Player**	**Record**	**W%**	**Hard**	**Clay**	**Grass**	**Carpet**
Brazil	2–0	100%	0–0	1–0	1–0	0–0
Hungary	2–0	100%	0–0	1–0	1–0	0–0
India	2–0	100%	2–0	0–0	0–0	0–0
Romania	2–0	100%	1–0	0–0	0–0	1–0
**Slovakia**	2–0	100%	1–0	0–0	1–0	0–0
Sweden	2–0	100%	0–0	2–0	0–0	0–0
Bulgaria	2–1	66.67%	1–1	1–0	0–0	0–0
China	2–1	66.67%	1–1	1–0	0–0	0–0
Austria	2–3	40%	0–0	1–3	1–0	0–0
Colombia	1–0	100%	1–0	0–0	0–0	0–0
Finland	1–0	100%	0–0	1–0	0–0	0–0
Israel	1–0	100%	1–0	0–0	0–0	0–0
Latvia	1–0	100%	0–0	1–0	0–0	0–0
Mexico	1–0	100%	0–0	1–0	0–0	0–0
Norway	1–0	100%	0–0	1–0	0–0	0–0
Philippines	1–0	100%	0–0	1–0	0–0	0–0
Serbia	1–0	100%	0–0	1–0	0–0	0–0
Uzbekistan	1–0	100%	1–0	0–0	0–0	0–0
Thailand	1–1	50%	1–1	0–0	0–0	0–0
Ukraine	1–2	33.33%	0–1	1–1	0–0	0–0

*Previous champions in bold, teams that have been ranked no. 1 in italics, statistics as of 19 April 2015.

== See also ==
- Billie Jean King Cup
- Australia Davis Cup team
- Australia at the Hopman Cup
- Tennis Australia
