= 2014 Fed Cup World Group =

Part of tennis tournament

- Date: 8 February – 9 November
- Edition: 24th

Champions
- Czech Republic
- Fed Cup

The World Group was the highest level of Fed Cup competition in 2014. The Czech Republic beat Germany in the final to win a third Fed Cup title in four years.

Participating Teams
Australia	Czech Republic	Germany	Italy
Russia	Slovakia	Spain	United States

== Draw ==
Quarterfinals; 8–9 February
Cleveland, United States (indoor hard)
1	Italy	3
United States	1
Sevilla, Spain (outdoor clay)
Spain	2
3	Czech Republic	3
Bratislava, Slovakia (indoor hard)
4	Slovakia	1
Germany	3
Hobart, Australia (outdoor hard)
Australia	4
2	Russia	0

Semifinals; 19–20 April
Ostrava, Czech Republic (indoor hard)
1	Italy	0
3	Czech Republic	4
Brisbane, Australia (outdoor hard)
Germany	3
Australia	1

Final; 8–9 November
Prague, Czech Republic (indoor hard)
3	Czech Republic	3
Germany	1

== First round ==
=== United States vs. Italy ===
Italy
3
Public Auditorium, Cleveland, United States
8–9 February 2014
Hard (indoors)

United States
1

			1	2	3
1	(Italy) (United States)	Karin Knapp; Christina McHale	6; 3	3; 6	6; 1
2	(Italy) (United States)	Camila Giorgi; Madison Keys	6; 2	6; 1
3	(Italy) (United States)	Karin Knapp; Alison Riske	6; 3	7; 5
4	(Italy) (United States)	Camila Giorgi; Christina McHale				not played
5	(Italy) (United States)	Nastassja Burnett / Alice Matteucci; Lauren Davis / Madison Keys	2; 6	3; 6

=== Spain vs. Czech Republic ===
Spain
2
Centro de Tenis Blas Infante, Seville, Spain
8–10 February 2014
Red clay (outdoors)

Czech Republic
3

			1	2	3
1	(Spain) (Czech Republic)	Carla Suárez Navarro; Barbora Záhlavová-Strýcová	6; 1	6; 4
2	(Spain) (Czech Republic)	María Teresa Torró Flor; Klára Zakopalová	3; 6	6; 2	1; 6
3	(Spain) (Czech Republic)	Carla Suárez Navarro; Klára Zakopalová	1; 6	6; 3	6; 3
4	(Spain) (Czech Republic)	Silvia Soler Espinosa; Lucie Šafářová	6; 4	1; 6	3; 6
5	(Spain) (Czech Republic)	Silvia Soler Espinosa / Carla Suárez Navarro; Andrea Hlaváčková / Barbora Záhlavová-Strýcová	6^{7} 7^{9}	3; 6

=== Slovakia vs. Germany ===
Slovakia
1
Aegon Arena, Bratislava, Slovakia
8–9 February 2014
DecoColor hard (indoors)

Germany
3

			1	2	3
1	(Slovakia) (Germany)	Dominika Cibulková; Andrea Petkovic	6; 2	6^{6} 7^{8}	2; 6
2	(Slovakia) (Germany)	Daniela Hantuchová; Angelique Kerber	6^{7} 7^{9}	1; 6
3	(Slovakia) (Germany)	Dominika Cibulková; Angelique Kerber	3; 6	6^{5} 7^{7}
4	(Slovakia) (Germany)	Daniela Hantuchová; Andrea Petkovic				not played
5	(Slovakia) (Germany)	Jana Čepelová / Magdaléna Rybáriková; Julia Görges / Anna-Lena Grönefeld	4; 6	6; 3	10; 7

=== Australia vs. Russia ===
Australia
4
Hobart International Tennis Centre, Hobart, Australia
8–9 February 2014
Plexicushion (outdoors)

Russia
0

			1	2	3
1	(Australia) (Russia)	Casey Dellacqua; Irina Khromacheva	6; 0	6; 2
2	(Australia) (Russia)	Samantha Stosur; Veronika Kudermetova	6; 4	6; 0
3	(Australia) (Russia)	Samantha Stosur; Victoria Kan	6; 2	6; 3
4	(Australia) (Russia)	Casey Dellacqua; Veronika Kudermetova				not played
5	(Australia) (Russia)	Ashleigh Barty / Casey Dellacqua; Irina Khromacheva / Valeria Solovyeva	6; 1	6; 3

== Semifinals ==
=== Czech Republic vs. Italy ===
Czech Republic
4
ČEZ Aréna, Ostrava, Czech Republic
19–20 April 2014
Hard (indoors)

Italy
0

			1	2	3
1	(Czech Republic) (Italy)	Lucie Šafářová; Sara Errani	6; 4	6; 1
2	(Czech Republic) (Italy)	Petra Kvitová; Camila Giorgi	6; 4	6; 2
3	(Czech Republic) (Italy)	Petra Kvitová; Roberta Vinci	6; 3	7; 5
4	(Czech Republic) (Italy)	Lucie Šafářová; Camila Giorgi				not played
5	(Czech Republic) (Italy)	Andrea Hlaváčková / Klára Koukalová; Camila Giorgi / Karin Knapp	6; 2	5; 7	11; 9

=== Germany vs. Australia ===
Germany
3
Pat Rafter Arena, Brisbane, Australia
19–20 April 2014
Plexicushion (outdoors)

Australia
1

			1	2	3
1	(Germany) (Australia)	Andrea Petkovic; Samantha Stosur	6; 1	7^{9} 6^{7}
2	(Germany) (Australia)	Angelique Kerber; Casey Dellacqua	6; 1	6; 0
3	(Germany) (Australia)	Angelique Kerber; Samantha Stosur	4; 6	6; 0	6; 3
4	(Germany) (Australia)	Andrea Petkovic; Casey Dellacqua				not played
5	(Germany) (Australia)	Julia Görges / Anna-Lena Grönefeld; Ashleigh Barty / Casey Dellacqua	2; 6	7^{7} 6^{5}	2; 10

== Final ==
=== Czech Republic vs. Germany ===
Czech Republic
3
O2 Arena, Prague, Czech Republic
8–9 November 2014
Novacrylic ultracushion hard (indoors)

Germany
1

			1	2	3
1	(Czech Republic) (Germany)	Petra Kvitová; Andrea Petkovic	6; 2	6; 4
2	(Czech Republic) (Germany)	Lucie Šafářová; Angelique Kerber	6; 4	6; 4
3	(Czech Republic) (Germany)	Petra Kvitová; Angelique Kerber	7^{7} 6^{5}	4; 6	6; 4
4	(Czech Republic) (Germany)	Lucie Šafářová; Andrea Petkovic				not played
5	(Czech Republic) (Germany)	Andrea Hlaváčková / Lucie Hradecká; Julia Görges / Sabine Lisicki	4; 6	3; 6

2014 Fed Cup champions

Czech Republic
Eighth title
