= 2002 Fed Cup =

International women's tennis competition

Details
- Duration: 27 April – 3 November
- Edition: 40th

Achievements (singles)

The 2002 Fed Cup was the 40th edition of the most important competition between national teams in women's tennis.

The final took place at the Palacio de Congresos de Maspalomas in Gran Canaria, Spain on 2–3 November. Slovakia defeated Spain, giving Slovakia their first title.

== World Group ==
Participating teams
Argentina	Australia	Austria	Belgium
Croatia	Czech Republic	France	Germany
Hungary	Italy	Russia	Slovakia
Spain	Sweden	Switzerland	United States

=== Draw ===
First round 27–28 April
Brussels, Belgium (Indoor clay)
1	Belgium	3
Australia	1
Milan, Italy (Outdoor clay)
Sweden	0
6	Italy	5
Bratislava, Slovakia (Outdoor clay)
7	Slovakia	3
Switzerland	2
Buenos Aires, Argentina (Outdoor clay)
Argentina	2
4	France	3
Charlotte, NC, United States (Outdoor clay)
3	United States	2
Austria	3
Bol, Croatia (Outdoor clay)
Croatia	3
8	Czech Republic	2
Almería, Spain (Outdoor clay)
5	Spain	4
Hungary	1
Dresden, Germany (Outdoor clay)
Germany	3
2	Russia	2

Quarterfinals; 20–21 July
Bologna, Italy (Outdoor clay)
1	Belgium	1
6	Italy	4
Bratislava, Slovakia (Indoor carpet)
7	Slovakia	4
4	France	1
Pörtschach, Austria (Outdoor clay)
Austria	4
Croatia	1
Capdepera, Spain (Outdoor clay)
5	Spain	5
Germany	0

Semifinals; 30–31 October
Gran Canaria, Spain (Indoor hard)
6	Italy	1
7	Slovakia	3
Gran Canaria, Spain (Indoor hard)
Austria	2
5	Spain	3

Final; 2–3 November
Gran Canaria, Spain (Indoor hard)
7	Slovakia	3
5	Spain	1

== World Group play-offs ==
The eight losing teams in the World Group first round ties and eight winners of the Zonal Group I sections competed in the World Group play-offs for spots in the 2003 World Group.

Date: 20–21 July

Venue	Surface	Home team	Score	Visiting team
Wollongong, Australia	Indoor hard	Australia	3–2	Netherlands
Malmö, Sweden	Outdoor clay	Sweden	3–2	Switzerland
Budapest, Hungary	Outdoor clay	Hungary	0–5	Argentina
Springfield, MO, United States	Outdoor hard	United States	5–0	Israel
Přerov, Czech Republic	Outdoor clay	Czech Republic	5–0	Canada
Beijing, China	Indoor hard	China	0–5	Russia
Bogotá, Colombia	Outdoor clay	Colombia	w/o	Japan
Portorož, Slovenia	Outdoor clay	Slovenia	4–1	Ukraine

== Americas Zone ==
- Nations in **bold** advanced to the higher level of competition.
- Nations in italics were relegated down to a lower level of competition.

=== Group I ===
Venue: San Luis Potosí, Mexico (outdoor hard)

Dates: 23–27 April

Participating teams

- Bahamas
- Brazil
- **Canada**
- **Colombia**
- Mexico
- Paraguay
- Puerto Rico
- Uruguay
- Venezuela

=== Group II ===
Venue: Havana, Cuba (outdoor hard)

Dates: 14–18 May

Participating teams

- Bermuda
- Bolivia
- Chile
- Costa Rica
- **Cuba**
- Dominican Republic
- Eastern Caribbean
- **El Salvador**
- Guatemala
- Jamaica
- Panama
- Trinidad and Tobago

== Asia/Oceania Zone ==
- Nations in **bold** advanced to the higher level of competition.
- Nations in italics were relegated down to a lower level of competition.

=== Group I ===
Venue: Guangzhou, China (outdoor hard)

Dates: 4–9 March

Participating teams

- **China**
- Chinese Taipei
- Hong Kong
- India
- Indonesia
- **Japan**
- New Zealand
- Philippines
- South Korea
- Thailand
- Uzbekistan

=== Group II ===
Venue: Guangzhou, China (outdoor hard)

Dates: 4–8 March

Participating teams

- **Kazakhstan**
- **Malaysia**
- Pacific Oceania
- Singapore
- Syria

== Europe/Africa Zone ==
- Nations in **bold** advanced to the higher level of competition.
- Nations in italics were relegated down to a lower level of competition.

=== Group I ===
Venue: Antalya, Turkey (outdoor clay)

Dates: 24–28 April

Participating teams

- Belarus
- Bosnia and Herzegovina
- Bulgaria
- Estonia
- Georgia
- Greece
- **Israel**
- Luxembourg
- **Netherlands**
- Poland
- Portugal
- Romania
- **Slovenia**
- Turkey
- **Ukraine**
- FR Yugoslavia

=== Group II ===
Venue: Pretoria, South Africa (outdoor hard)

Dates: 9–13 April

Participating teams

- Algeria
- Botswana
- **Denmark**
- Egypt
- Finland
- **Great Britain**
- **Ireland**
- Latvia
- Liechtenstein
- Lithuania
- Malta
- Norway
- **South Africa**
- Tunisia

== Year-end rankings ==
The Fed Cup rankings were first instated on 4 November 2002, and were measured by combining points earned from the previous four years. The first No. 1 ranked nation, and the year-end No. 1 for 2002, was Slovakia.

Rank	Nation	Points
1	Slovakia	22,125.0
2	Spain	21,000.0
3	Belgium	16,625.0
4	United States	12,500.0
5	Russia	12,250.0
6	France	9,000.0
7	Italy	8,625.0
8	Austria	7,625.0
9	Argentina	6,725.0
10	Germany	5,625.0
