= 1965 Federation Cup (tennis) =

International women's tennis competition

Details
- Duration: 15 – 18 January
- Edition: 3rd
- Teams: 11

Champion
- Winning nation: Australia

The 1965 Federation Cup was a team tennis tournament that took place at the Kooyong Lawn Tennis Club in Melbourne, Australia. It was third edition of what is now known as the Fed Cup and had eleven nations participating in the tournament throughout the four days from 15–18 January 1965.

The eleven teams played in a knockout format with six teams having to play in the opening round to join the remaining five who received first rounds byes. After winning all of the ties 3-0, the final was between the United States and Australia who for the third time in consecutive years met up in the final which was played on the 18 January. After Lesley Turner and Margaret Smith each recorded wins in the singles, Australia would defend their title that they won in 1964 despite a loss in the doubles.

== Participating teams ==
Participating Teams
Argentina	Australia	Brazil	France	Great Britain	Italy
Japan	New Zealand	South Africa	United States	West Germany	

== Draw ==
All ties were played at the Kooyong Lawn Tennis Club in Melbourne, Australia on grass courts.

First Round; 15 January
West Germany	1
Italy	2
Japan	0
France	3
New Zealand	2
Argentina	1

Quarterfinals; 16 January
United States	3
Italy	0
Great Britain	2
South Africa	1
France	2
Brazil	1
New Zealand	0
Australia	3

Semifinals; 17 January
United States	3
Great Britain	0
France	0
Australia	3

Final; 18 January
United States	1
Australia	2

=== First round ===
West Germany vs. Italy

West Germany
1
Kooyong Lawn Tennis Club, Melbourne, Australia
15 January 1965
Grass

Italy
2

			1	2	3
1	(West Germany) (Italy)	Helga Niessen; Lea Pericoli	6; 8	0; 4		retired
2	(West Germany) (Italy)	Heide Schildknecht; Francesca Gordigiani	6; 4	5; 7	4; 6
3	(West Germany) (Italy)	Helga Niessen / Heide Schildknecht; Francesca Gordigiani / Lea Pericoli	6; 3	6; 1

Japan vs. France

Japan
0
Kooyong Lawn Tennis Club, Melbourne, Australia
15 January 1965
Grass

France
3

			1	2	3
1	(Japan) (France)	Kazuko Kuromatsu; Françoise Dürr	2; 6	1; 6
2	(Japan) (France)	Yohko Obata; Janine Lieffrig	3; 6	3; 6
3	(Japan) (France)	Kazuko Kuromatsu / Yohko Obata; Françoise Dürr / Janine Lieffrig	3; 6	0; 6

New Zealand vs. Argentina

New Zealand
2
Kooyong Lawn Tennis Club, Melbourne, Australia
15 January 1965
Grass

Argentina
1

			1	2	3
1	(New Zealand) (Argentina)	Ruia Morrison-Davy; Norma Baylon	3; 6	3; 6
2	(New Zealand) (Argentina)	Elizabeth Terry; Nora Somoza	7; 5	6; 4
3	(New Zealand) (Argentina)	Ruia Morrison-Davy / Elizabeth Terry; Norma Baylon / Nora Somoza	6; 4	8; 6

=== Quarterfinals ===
United States vs. Italy

United States
3
Kooyong Lawn Tennis Club, Melbourne, Australia
16 January 1965
Grass

Italy
0

			1	2	3
1	(United States) (Italy)	Billie Jean Moffitt; Lea Pericoli	6; 3	6; 1
2	(United States) (Italy)	Carole Graebner; Francesca Gordigiani	6; 1	6; 0
3	(United States) (Italy)	Carole Graebner / Billie Jean Moffitt; Francesca Gordigiani / Lea Pericoli	6; 0	6; 2

Great Britain vs. South Africa

Great Britain
2
Kooyong Lawn Tennis Club, Melbourne, Australia
16 January 1965
Grass

South Africa
1

			1	2	3
1	(United Kingdom) (South Africa)	Ann Jones; Annette Van Zyl	2; 6	6; 3	1; 6
2	(United Kingdom) (South Africa)	Christine Truman; Bernice Vukovich	6; 2	2; 6	7; 5
3	(United Kingdom) (South Africa)	Ann Jones / Deidre Keller; Annette Van Zyl / Bernice Vukovich	6; 8	6; 3	6; 4

France vs. Brazil

France
2
Kooyong Lawn Tennis Club, Melbourne, Australia
16 January 1965
Grass

Brazil
1

			1	2	3
1	(France) (Brazil)	Françoise Dürr; Maria Bueno	1; 6	6; 4	1; 6
2	(France) (Brazil)	Janine Lieffrig; Maureen Schwartz	6; 1	6; 1
3	(France) (Brazil)	Françoise Dürr / Janine Lieffrig; Maria Bueno / Maureen Schwartz	6; 8	6; 3	6; 4

New Zealand vs. Australia

New Zealand
0
Kooyong Lawn Tennis Club, Melbourne, Australia
16 January 1965
Grass

Australia
3

			1	2	3
1	(New Zealand) (Australia)	Ruia Morrison-Davy; Margaret Smith	1; 6	4; 6
2	(New Zealand) (Australia)	Elizabeth Terry; Lesley Turner	3; 6	0; 6
3	(New Zealand) (Australia)	Ruia Morrison-Davy / Elizabeth Terry; Margaret Smith / Judy Tegart	2; 6	1; 6

=== Semifinals ===
United States vs. Great Britain

United States
3
Kooyong Lawn Tennis Club, Melbourne, Australia
17 January 1965
Grass

Great Britain
0

			1	2	3
1	(United States) (United Kingdom)	Carole Graebner; Christine Truman	6; 3	6; 2
2	(United States) (United Kingdom)	Billie Jean Moffitt; Ann Jones	6; 2	6; 4
3	(United States) (United Kingdom)	Carole Graebner / Billie Jean Moffitt; Ann Jones / Christine Truman	4; 6	8; 6	6; 4

France vs. Australia

France
0
Kooyong Lawn Tennis Club, Melbourne, Australia
17 January 1965
Grass

Australia
3

			1	2	3
1	(France) (Australia)	Françoise Dürr; Margaret Smith	2; 6	2; 6
2	(France) (Australia)	Janine Lieffrig; Lesley Turner	1; 6	5; 7
3	(France) (Australia)	Françoise Dürr / Janine Lieffrig; Margaret Smith / Judy Tegart	1; 6	4; 6

=== Final ===
United States vs. Australia

United States
1
Kooyong Lawn Tennis Club, Melbourne, Australia
18 January 1965
Grass

Australia
2

			1	2	3
1	(United States) (Australia)	Carole Graebner; Lesley Turner	3; 6	6; 2	3; 6
2	(United States) (Australia)	Billie Jean Moffitt; Margaret Smith	4; 6	6; 8
3	(United States) (Australia)	Carole Graebner / Billie Jean Moffitt; Margaret Smith / Judy Tegart	7; 5	4; 6	6; 4
