= 1970 Federation Cup (tennis) =

International women's tennis competition

Details
- Duration: 19–24 May
- Edition: 8th

Champion
- Winning nation: Australia

The 1970 Federation Cup was the eighth edition of what is now known as the Fed Cup. 22 nations participated in the tournament, which was held at the Freiburg Tennis Club in Freiburg, West Germany from 19 to 24 May. Australia defeated West Germany in the final.

== Participating teams ==
Participating Teams
Australia	Belgium	Canada	Czechoslovakia	France	Great Britain
Greece	Hungary	Indonesia	Israel	Italy	Japan
Netherlands	New Zealand	Norway	Poland	Sweden	Switzerland
South Africa		United States	West Germany	Yugoslavia	

== Draw ==
All ties were played at the Freiburg Tennis Club in Freiburg, West Germany on clay courts. |}

First round 19 May
Belgium	1
Switzerland	2
Italy
Poland	w/o
France	2
Japan	1
Netherlands	3
Greece	0
Canada	3
Norway	0
New Zealand
Israel	w/o

Second round 20–21 May
United States	3
Yugoslavia	0
Hungary	w/o
South Africa
West Germany	3
Switzerland	0
Italy	1
France	2
Netherlands	3
Canada	0
New Zealand	0
Great Britain	3
Indonesia	1
Sweden	2
Czechoslovakia	0
Australia	3

Quarterfinals; 22 May
United States	3
South Africa	0
West Germany	3
France	0
Netherlands	1
Great Britain	2
Sweden	0
Australia	3

Semifinals; 23 May
United States	1
West Germany	2
Great Britain	0
Australia	3

Final; 24 May
West Germany	0
Australia	3

=== First round ===
Belgium vs. Switzerland

Belgium
1
Freiburg Tennis Club, Freiburg, West Germany
19 May 1970
Clay

Switzerland
2

			1	2	3
1	(Belgium) (Switzerland)	Michele Kahn; Anne-Marie Studer	1; 6	0; 6
2	(Belgium) (Switzerland)	Ingrid Loeys; Marianne Kindler	4; 6	2; 6
3	(Belgium) (Switzerland)	Ingrid Loeys / Monique Van Haver; Rita Felix / Anne-Marie Studer	6; 4	6; 4

France vs. Japan

France
2
Freiburg Tennis Club, Freiburg, West Germany
19 May 1970
Clay

Japan
1

			1	2	3
1	(France) (Japan)	Odile de Roubin; Kimiyo Hatanaka	6; 4	6; 2
2	(France) (Japan)	Gail Chanfreau; Kazuko Sawamatsu	2; 6	6; 8
3	(France) (Japan)	Gail Chanfreau / Christiane Spinoza; Junko Sawamatsu / Kazuko Sawamatsu	6; 2	6; 3

Netherlands vs. Greece

Netherlands
3
Freiburg Tennis Club, Freiburg, West Germany
19 May 1970
Clay

Greece
0

			1	2	3
1	(Netherlands) (Greece)	Betty Stöve; Dionissia Asteri	6; 2	6; 2
2	(Netherlands) (Greece)	Marijke Schaar; Carol-Ann Kalgeropoulos	6; 0	6; 1
3	(Netherlands) (Greece)	Betty Stöve / Gertruida Walhof; Dionissia Asteri / Carol-Ann Kalgeropoulos	6; 2	7; 5

Canada vs. Norway

Canada
3
Freiburg Tennis Club, Freiburg, West Germany
19 May 1970
Clay

Norway
0

			1	2	3
1	(Canada) (Norway)	Jane O'Hara; Kirsten Robsahm	6; 2	6; 1
2	(Canada) (Norway)	Andrée Martin; Ellen Grindvold	3; 6	6; 2	6; 4
3	(Canada) (Norway)	Andrée Martin / Jane O'Hara; Ellen Grindvold / Kirsten Robsahm	6; 1	6; 3

=== Second round ===
United States vs. Yugoslavia

United States
3
Freiburg Tennis Club, Freiburg, West Germany
20 May 1970
Clay

Yugoslavia
0

			1	2	3
1	(United States) (Socialist Federal Republic of Yugoslavia)	Peaches Bartkowicz; Biljana Kostić	6; 0	6; 0
2	(United States) (Socialist Federal Republic of Yugoslavia)	Julie Heldman; Irena Škulj	6; 0	6; 0
3	(United States) (Socialist Federal Republic of Yugoslavia)	Mary-Ann Curtis / Julie Heldman; Alenka Pipan / Irena Škulj	6; 2	6; 1

West Germany vs. Switzerland

West Germany
3
Freiburg Tennis Club, Freiburg, West Germany
20 May 1970
Clay

Switzerland
0

			1	2	3
1	(West Germany) (Switzerland)	Helga Hösl; Anne-Marie Studer	6; 3	6; 0
2	(West Germany) (Switzerland)	Helga Niessen; Marianne Kindler	6; 1	6; 1
3	(West Germany) (Switzerland)	Katja Ebbinghaus / Helga Hösl; Rita Felix / Marianne Kindler	6; 2	6; 1

Italy vs. France

Italy
1
Freiburg Tennis Club, Freiburg, West Germany
20 May 1970
Clay

France
2

			1	2	3
1	(Italy) (France)	Lea Pericoli; Odile de Roubin	6; 2	6; 2
2	(Italy) (France)	Maria Teresa Riedl; Gail Chanfreau	0; 6	0; 6
3	(Italy) (France)	Silvana Lazzarino / Lea Pericoli; Gail Chanfreau / Christiane Spinoza	3; 6	6; 8

Netherlands vs. Canada

Netherlands
3
Freiburg Tennis Club, Freiburg, West Germany
21 May 1970
Clay

Canada
0

			1	2	3
1	(Netherlands) (Canada)	Betty Stöve; Jane O'Hara	6; 3	1; 6	10; 8
2	(Netherlands) (Canada)	Marijke Schaar; Faye Urban	6; 2	6; 3
3	(Netherlands) (Canada)	Betty Stöve / Gertruida Walhof; Andrée Martin / Jane O'Hara	6; 4	6; 3

New Zealand vs. Great Britain

New Zealand
0
Freiburg Tennis Club, Freiburg, West Germany
21 May 1970
Clay

Great Britain
3

			1	2	3
1	(New Zealand) (United Kingdom)	Robyn Legge; Winnie Shaw	1; 6	2; 6
2	(New Zealand) (United Kingdom)	Marilyn Pryde; Virginia Wade	3; 6	2; 6
3	(New Zealand) (United Kingdom)	Robyn Legge / Marilyn Pryde; Winnie Shaw / Joyce Williams	3; 6	1; 6

Indonesia vs. Sweden

Indonesia
1
Freiburg Tennis Club, Freiburg, West Germany
21 May 1970
Clay

Sweden
2

			1	2	3
1	(Indonesia) (Sweden)	Lita Liem; Ingrid Bentzer	6; 4	6; 1
2	(Indonesia) (Sweden)	Lany Kaligis; Christina Sandberg	2; 6	3; 6
3	(Indonesia) (Sweden)	Lany Kaligis / Lita Liem; Ingrid Bentzer / Christina Sandberg	6; 2	2; 6	3; 6

Czechoslovakia vs. Australia

Czechoslovakia
0
Freiburg Tennis Club, Freiburg, West Germany
21 May 1970
Clay

Australia
3

			1	2	3
1	(Czechoslovakia) (Australia)	Vlasta Vopičková; Karen Krantzcke	5; 7	1; 6
2	(Czechoslovakia) (Australia)	Alena Palmeová; Judy Dalton	6; 4	4; 6	2; 6
3	(Czechoslovakia) (Australia)	Alena Palmeová / Vlasta Vopičková; Judy Dalton / Karen Krantzcke	0; 6	3; 6

=== Quarterfinals ===
United States vs. South Africa

United States
3
Freiburg Tennis Club, Freiburg, West Germany
22 May 1970
Clay

South Africa
0

			1	2	3
1	(United States) (South Africa)	Peaches Bartkowicz; Marianna Brummer	6; 1	6; 2
2	(United States) (South Africa)	Julie Heldman; Brenda Kirk	6; 4	6; 0
3	(United States) (South Africa)	Mary-Ann Curtis / Julie Heldman; Brenda Kirk / Wendy Tomlinson	6; 4	6; 1

West Germany vs. France

West Germany
3
Freiburg Tennis Club, Freiburg, West Germany
22 May 1970
Clay

France
0

			1	2	3
1	(West Germany) (France)	Helga Hösl; Christiane Spinoza	6; 4	7; 5
2	(West Germany) (France)	Helga Niessen; Gail Chanfreau	6; 8	6; 3	6; 2
3	(West Germany) (France)	Katja Ebbinghaus / Helga Hösl; Odile de Roubin / Christiane Spinoza	6; 1	6; 4

Netherlands vs. Great Britain

Netherlands
1
Freiburg Tennis Club, Freiburg, West Germany
22 May 1970
Clay

Great Britain
2

			1	2	3
1	(Netherlands) (United Kingdom)	Betty Stöve; Winnie Shaw	0; 6	6; 3	6; 1
2	(Netherlands) (United Kingdom)	Marijke Schaar; Virginia Wade	0; 6	1; 6
3	(Netherlands) (United Kingdom)	Betty Stöve / Gertruida Walhof; Winnie Shaw / Virginia Wade	3; 6	1; 6

Sweden vs. Australia

Sweden
0
Freiburg Tennis Club, Freiburg, West Germany
22 May 1970
Clay

Australia
3

			1	2	3
1	(Sweden) (Australia)	Ingrid Bentzer; Karen Krantzcke	1; 6	3; 6
2	(Sweden) (Australia)	Christina Sandberg; Judy Dalton	6; 1	4; 6	2; 6
3	(Sweden) (Australia)	Ingrid Bentzer / Christina Sandberg; Judy Dalton / Karen Krantzcke	1; 1			retired

=== Semifinals ===
United States vs. West Germany

United States
1
Freiburg Tennis Club, Freiburg, West Germany
23 May 1970
Clay

West Germany
2

			1	2	3
1	(United States) (West Germany)	Peaches Bartkowicz; Helga Hösl	6; 2	6; 2
2	(United States) (West Germany)	Julie Heldman; Helga Niessen	0; 6	6; 8
3	(United States) (West Germany)	Mary-Ann Curtis / Julie Heldman; Helga Hösl / Helga Niessen	5; 7	6; 4	0; 6

Great Britain vs. Australia

Great Britain
0
Freiburg Tennis Club, Freiburg, West Germany
23 May 1970
Clay

Australia
3

			1	2	3
1	(United Kingdom) (Australia)	Joyce Williams; Karen Krantzcke	4; 6	5; 7
2	(United Kingdom) (Australia)	Virginia Wade; Judy Dalton	4; 6	6; 4	5; 7
3	(United Kingdom) (Australia)	Winnie Shaw / Virginia Wade; Judy Dalton / Karen Krantzcke	3; 6	3; 6

=== Final ===
West Germany vs. Australia

West Germany
0
Freiburg Tennis Club, Freiburg, West Germany
24 May 1970
Clay

Australia
3

			1	2	3
1	(West Germany) (Australia)	Helga Hösl; Karen Krantzcke	2; 6	3; 6
2	(West Germany) (Australia)	Helga Niessen; Judy Dalton	6; 4	3; 6	3; 6
3	(West Germany) (Australia)	Helga Hösl / Helga Niessen; Judy Dalton / Karen Krantzcke	2; 6	5; 7

== Consolation round ==
=== Draw ===
Consolation first round 21 May
Canada	2
Greece	0

Consolation quarterfinals 22 May
Japan	3
New Zealand	0
Norway
Canada	w/o
Belgium
Indonesia	w/o
Yugoslavia	1
Switzerland	2

Consolation semifinals 23 May
Japan	3
Norway	0
Belgium	0
Switzerland	3

Consolation final 24 May
Japan	3
Switzerland	0

=== First round ===
Canada vs. Greece

Canada
2
Freiburg Tennis Club, Freiburg, West Germany
21 May 1970
Clay

Greece
0

			1	2	3
1	(Canada) (Greece)	Jane O'Hara; Alice Koutsouri	6; 3	6; 0
2	(Canada) (Greece)	Andrée Martin; Dionissia Asteri	6; 0	8; 6
3	(Canada) (Greece)					not played

=== Quarterfinals ===
Japan vs. New Zealand

Japan
3
Freiburg Tennis Club, Freiburg, West Germany
22 May 1970
Clay

New Zealand
0

			1	2	3
1	(Japan) (New Zealand)	Kimiyo Hatanaka; Robyn Legge	6; 3	6; 1
2	(Japan) (New Zealand)	Kazuko Sawamatsu; Marilyn Pryde	6; 2	6; 4
3	(Japan) (New Zealand)	Kimiyo Hatanaka / Kazuko Sawamatsu; Robyn Legge / Marilyn Pryde	6; 4	6; 2

Yugoslavia vs. Switzerland

Yugoslavia
1
Freiburg Tennis Club, Freiburg, West Germany
22 May 1970
Clay

Switzerland
2

		1	2	3
1	(Socialist Federal Republic of Yugoslavia) (Switzerland)
2	(Socialist Federal Republic of Yugoslavia) (Switzerland)
3	(Socialist Federal Republic of Yugoslavia) (Switzerland)

=== Semifinals ===
Japan vs. Norway

Japan
3
Freiburg Tennis Club, Freiburg, West Germany
23 May 1970
Clay

Norway
0

			1	2	3
1	(Japan) (Norway)	Kimiyo Hatanaka; Kirsten Robsahm	6; 4	6; 0
2	(Japan) (Norway)	Kazuko Sawamatsu; Ellen Grindvold	6; 2	6; 2
3	(Japan) (Norway)	Kimiyo Hatanaka / Kazuko Sawamatsu; Ellen Grindvold / Liv Jagge	6; 4	6; 2

Belgium vs. Switzerland

Belgium
0
Freiburg Tennis Club, Freiburg, West Germany
23 May 1970
Clay

Switzerland
3

			1	2	3
1	(Belgium) (Switzerland)	Monique Van Haver; Rita Felix	2; 6	1; 6
2	(Belgium) (Switzerland)	Ingrid Loeys; Marianne Kindler	5; 7	1; 6
3	(Belgium) (Switzerland)	Michele Kahn / Monique Van Haver; Rita Felix / Anne-Marie Studer	4; 6	3; 6

=== Final ===
Japan vs. Switzerland

Japan
3
Freiburg Tennis Club, Freiburg, West Germany
24 May 1970
Clay

Switzerland
0

			1	2	3
1	(Japan) (Switzerland)	Kimiyo Hatanaka; Rita Felix	6; 3	8; 6
2	(Japan) (Switzerland)	Kazuko Sawamatsu; Anne-Marie Studer	6; 2	6; 3
3	(Japan) (Switzerland)	Kimiyo Hatanaka / Kazuko Sawamatsu; Rita Felix / Anne-Marie Studer	6; 4	6; 3
