= Carl August von der Meden =

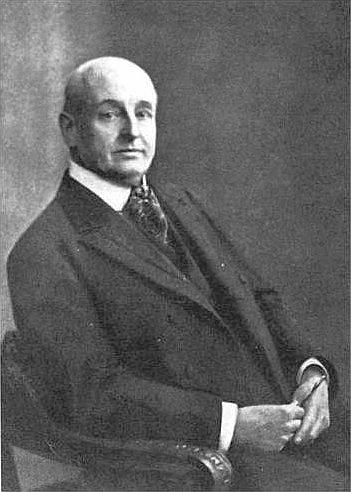
Carl August von der Meden

Carl August von der Meden (6 December 1841 – 23 May 1911) was the first president of the Deutscher Tennis Bund (English: German Tennis Federation) and was called the Father of lawn tennis in Germany.

Von der Meden was born on 6 December 1841, the son of a Hamburg merchant and real estate agent. For over a decade he lived in England and worked in the financial district of London. On his way to work he passed the All England Club in Wimbledon. On 9 December 1868 he married Sophie Mathlde Eckhardt in Bradford and the couple had three daughters and one son.

At the latest in 1881 he returned to Germany. He became the first chairman of the "Uhlenhorster Eislauf-Vereins". This Hamburg club, founded in 1888, had added tennis to its activities and in 1892 organized the first German Championships. Von der Meden was the tournament director, a function which he later also fulfilled for the Bad Homburg tournament which hosted the German Championships between 1897 and 1901. In 1901 von der Meden became chairman of the Hamburger Tennis-Gilde, a cooperation of Hamburg tennis clubs. On 19 May 1902 he was part of the meeting in Berlin that founded the Deutscher Lawn Tennis Bund and he was elected its first president.

Von der Meden died on 23 May 1911, aged 69.

The matches in the German tennis league are called the Medenspiele (English: Meden games) in his honor.
