= German Tennis Federation =

Tennis governing body in Germany

- Sport: Tennis
- Abbreviation: DTB
- Founded: 1902
- Affiliation: International Tennis Federation (ITF)
- Headquarters: Hamburg
- President: Ulrich Klaus

Official website
- tennis.de/dtb
- (Germany)

The German Tennis Federation (German: Deutscher Tennis Bund, short form: DTB) is the governing body of tennis federations and clubs in Germany.

It is the largest tennis federation in the world with more than 1,800,000 members.

Founded on 19 May 1902 in Berlin as the Deutschen Lawn Tennis Bund (DLTB) it is one of the oldest sport federations of the world. Its first president was Carl August von der Meden between 1902 and 1911. In 1920 it dropped "Lawn" from its name.

It organises the International German Open at the Hamburger Rothenbaum, the Davis Cup and Fed Cup home matches.

== See also ==
- Tennis in Germany
