= Switzerland Billie Jean King Cup team =

Swiss women's tennis team

Switzerland
- Captain: Heinz Günthardt
- ITF ranking: 5 ▲3 (19 April 2022)
- Colors: red & white
- First year: 1963
- Years played: 57
- Ties played (W–L): 151 (86–65)
- Years in World Group: 34 (33–28)
- Titles: 1 (2022)
- Runners-up: 2 (1998, 2020-21)
- Most total wins: Patty Schnyder (50–23)
- Most singles wins: Patty Schnyder (33–17)
- Most doubles wins: Patty Schnyder (17–6)
- Best doubles team: Petra Delhees / Christiane Jolissaint (10–6)
- Most ties played: Patty Schnyder (38)
- Most years played: Timea Bacsinszky (14)

The Switzerland women's national tennis team represents Switzerland in Fed Cup tennis competition and are governed by Swiss Tennis. They currently compete in World Group.

== Current team ==
Most recent year-end rankings are used.

Name	Born	First	Last		Ties	Win/Loss			Ranks	
Name	Born	First	Year	Tie	Ties	Sin	Dou	Tot	Sin	Dou
Jil Teichmann	July 15, 1997	2018	2022	Australia	10	5–1	5–1	10–2	35	108
Belinda Bencic	March 10, 1997	2012	2022	Australia	19	17–6	6–2	23–8	12	133
Simona Waltert	December 13, 2000	2022	2022	Canada	1	0–0	0–1	0–1	120	399
Viktorija Golubic	October 16, 1992	2014	2022	Czech Republic	13	7–6	4–2	11–8	77	90

== History ==
Switzerland competed in its first Fed Cup in 1963. Their best result was the win of the Billie Jean King Cup in 2022 they also reaching the final in 1998, where they lost to Spain 3-2 and 2020-21, where they lost to the Russian Tennis Federation 2–0.

== Results ==
Only World Group, World Group Play-off, World Group II, and World Group II Play-off ties are included.

=== 1963–1969 ===
Year	Competition	Date	Location	Opponent	Score	Result
1963	World Group, 1st Round	17 June	London (GBR)	Netherlands	0–3	Lost
1964	World Group, 1st Round	1 September	Philadelphia (USA)	France	0–3	Lost
1966	World Group, 2nd Round	12 May	Turin (ITA)	Australia	0–3	Lost
1967	World Group, 2nd Round	8 June	Berlin (FRG)	Canada	1–2	Lost
1968	World Group, 2nd Round	23 May	Paris (FRA)	United States	0–3	Lost
1969	World Group, 2nd Round	21 May	Athens (GRE)	Czechoslovakia	0–3	Lost

=== 1970–1979 ===
Year	Competition	Date	Location	Opponent	Score	Result
1970	World Group, 1st Round	19 May	Freiburg (FRG)	Belgium	2–1	Won
1970	World Group, 2nd Round	20 May	Freiburg (FRG)	West Germany	0–3	Lost
1972	World Group, 1st Round	20 Mar	Johannesburg (RSA)	Brazil	1–2	Lost
1973	World Group, 1st Round	1 May	Bad Homburg (FRG)	Belgium	0–3	Lost
1974	World Group, 1st Round	May	Naples (ITA)	Yugoslavia	W/O	Won
1974	World Group, 2nd Round	May	Naples (ITA)	South Africa	0–3	Lost
1975	World Group, 1st Round	May	Aix-en-Provence (FRA)	United States	0–3	Lost
1976	World Group, 1st Round	August	Philadelphia (USA)	Indonesia	3–0	Won
1976	World Group, 2nd Round	August	Philadelphia (USA)	Canada	2–1	Won
1976	World Group, Quarterfinal	August	Philadelphia (USA)	United States	0–3	Lost
1977	World Group, 1st Round	June	Eastbourne (GBR)	Norway	2–1	Won
1977	World Group, 2nd Round	June	Eastbourne (GBR)	United States	0–3	Lost
1978	World Group, 1st Round	November	Melbourne (AUS)	Ireland	3–0	Won
1978	World Group, 2nd Round	November	Melbourne (AUS)	Romania	1–2	Lost
1979	World Group, 1st Round	April	Madrid (ESP)	Denmark	3–0	Won
1979	World Group, 2nd Round	May	Madrid (ESP)	Romania	2–1	Won
1979	World Group, Quarterfinal	May	Madrid (ESP)	Soviet Union	1–2	Lost

=== 1980–1989 ===
Year	Competition	Date	Location	Opponent	Score	Result
1980	World Group, 1st Round	May	Berlin (FRG)	Denmark	2–1	Won
1980	World Group, 2nd Round	May	Berlin (FRG)	Romania	1–2	Lost
1981	World Group, 1st Round	November	Tokyo (JPN)	Greece	3–0	Won
1981	World Group, 2nd Round	November	Tokyo (JPN)	Chinese Taipei	3–0	Won
1981	World Group, Quarterfinal	November	Tokyo (JPN)	West Germany	2–1	Won
1981	World Group, Semifinal	November	Tokyo (JPN)	United States	0–3	Lost
1982	World Group, 1st Round	July	Santa Clara (USA)	New Zealand	2–1	Won
1982	World Group, 2nd Round	July	Santa Clara (USA)	Sweden	2–1	Won
1982	World Group, Quarterfinal	July	Santa Clara (USA)	West Germany	0–3	Lost
1983	World Group, 1st Round	July	Zürich (SUI)	Bulgaria	3–0	Won
1983	World Group, 2nd Round	July	Zürich (SUI)	Romania	2–1	Won
1983	World Group, Quarterfinal	July	Zürich (SUI)	Australia	2–1	Won
1983	World Group, Semifinal	July	Zürich (SUI)	West Germany	0–3	Lost
1984	World Group, 1st Round	July	São Paulo (BRA)	Bulgaria	2–1	Won
1984	World Group, 2nd Round	July	São Paulo (BRA)	United States	1–2	Lost
1985	World Group, 1st Round	October	Nagoya (JPN)	Netherlands	2–1	Won
1985	World Group, 2nd Round	October	Nagoya (JPN)	Czechoslovakia	1–2	Lost
1986	World Group, 1st Round	July	Prague (TCH)	Malta	3–0	Won
1986	World Group, 2nd Round	July	Prague (TCH)	Czechoslovakia	0–3	Lost
1987	World Group, 1st Round	July	Vancouver (CAN)	Argentina	0–3	Lost
1988	World Group, 1st Round	December	Melbourne (AUS)	United States	0–3	Lost
1989	World Group, 1st Round	October	Tokyo (JPN)	Soviet Union	0–2	Lost

=== 1990–1999 ===
Year	Competition	Date	Location	Opponent	Score	Result
1990	World Group, 1st Round	July	Atlanta (USA)	Netherlands	1–2	Lost
1991	World Group, 1st Round	23 July	Nottingham (GBR)	Argentina	2–0	Won
1991	World Group, 2nd Round	24 July	Nottingham (GBR)	China	2–1	Won
1991	World Group, Quarterfinal	25 July	Nottingham (GBR)	Czechoslovakia	1–2	Lost
1992	World Group, 1st Round	14 July	Frankfurt (GER)	Sweden	1–2	Lost
1993	World Group, 1st Round	20 July	Frankfurt (GER)	United States	0–3	Lost
1994	World Group, 1st Round	19 July	Frankfurt (GER)	Canada	0–3	Lost
1996	World Group II, Play-off	13–14 July	Jakarta (INA)	Indonesia	3–2	Won
1997	World Group II	1–2 March	Košice (SVK)	Slovakia	3–2	Won
1997	World Group, Play-off	12–13 July	Zürich (SUI)	Argentina	5–0	Won
1998	World Group, 1st Round	18–19 April	Brno (CZE)	Czech Republic	4–1	Won
1998	World Group, Semifinal	25–26 July	Sion (SUI)	France	5–0	Won
1998	World Group, Final	19–20 September	Geneva (SUI)	Spain	2–3	Lost
1999	World Group, 1st Round	17–18 April	Zürich (SUI)	Slovakia	0–5	Lost

=== 2000–2009 ===
Year	Competition	Date	Location	Opponent	Score	Result
2000	World Group, Round Robin	27 April	Bratislava (SVK)	Slovakia	2–1	Won
2000	World Group, Round Robin	28 April	Bratislava (SVK)	Czech Republic	1–2	Lost
2000	World Group, Round Robin	29 April	Bratislava (SVK)	Austria	2–1	Won
2001	World Group, Play-off	21–22 July	Sydney (AUS)	Australia	1–4	Lost
2002	World Group, 1st Round	27–28 April	Bratislava (SVK)	Slovakia	2–3	Lost
2002	World Group, Play-off	20–21 July	Malmö (SWE)	Sweden	2–3	Lost
2003	World Group, Play-off	19–20 July	Winterthur (SUI)	Israel	4–1	Won
2004	World Group, 1st Round	24–25 July	Murcia (ESP)	Spain	2–3	Lost
2004	World Group, Play-off	10–11 July	Dorval (CAN)	Canada	3–2	Won
2005	World Group II, 1st Round	23–24 April	Neuchâtel (SUI)	Slovakia	3–2	Won
2005	World Group, Play-off	9–10 July	Lausanne (SUI)	Austria	1–4	Lost
2006	World Group II, 1st Round	22–23 April	Tokyo (JPN)	Japan	1–4	Lost
2006	World Group II, Play-off	15–16 July	Chavannes-de-Bogis (SUI)	Australia	0–5	Lost
2008	World Group II, Play-off	26–27 April	Dornbirn (AUT)	Austria	3–2	Won
2009	World Group II, 1st Round	7–8 February	Zürich (SUI)	Germany	2–3	Lost
2009	World Group II, Play-off	25–26 April	Mildura (AUS)	Australia	1–3	Lost

=== 2010–2019 ===
Year	Competition	Date	Location	Opponent	Score	Result
2011	World Group II, Play-off	16–17 April	Lugano (SUI)	Sweden	4–1	Won
2012	World Group II, 1st Round	4–5 February	Fribourg (SUI)	Australia	1–4	Lost
2012	World Group II, Play-off	21–22 April	Yverdon-les-Bains (SUI)	Belarus	4–1	Won
2013	World Group II, 1st Round	9–10 February	Bern (SUI)	Belgium	4–1	Won
2013	World Group, Play-off	20–21 April	Chiasso (SUI)	Australia	1–3	Lost
2014	World Group II, 1st Round	8–9 February	Paris (FRA)	France	2–3	Lost
2014	World Group II, Play-off	19–20 April	Catanduva (BRA)	Brazil	4–1	Won
2015	World Group II, 1st Round	7–8 February	Helsingborg (SWE)	Sweden	3–1	Won
2015	World Group, Play-off	18–19 April	Zielona Góra (POL)	Poland	3–2	Won
2016	World Group, 1st Round	6–7 February	Leipzig (GER)	Germany	3–2	Won
2016	World Group, Semifinal	16–17 April	Lucerne (SUI)	Czech Republic	2–3	Lost
2017	World Group, 1st Round	11–12 February	Geneva (SUI)	France	4–1	Won
2017	World Group, Semifinal	22–23 April	Minsk (BLR)	Belarus	2–3	Lost
2018	World Group, 1st Round	10–11 February	Prague (CZE)	Czech Republic	1–3	Lost
2018	World Group, Play-off	21–22 April	Cluj-Napoca (ROU)	Romania	1–3	Lost
2019	World Group II, 1st Round	9–10 February	Biel/Bienne (SUI)	Italy	3–1	Won
2019	World Group, Play-off	20–21 April	San Antonio (USA)	United States	2–3	Lost

=== 2020–2029 ===
Year	Competition	Date	Location	Opponent	Score	Result
2020	Qualifiers, 1st round	7–8 February	Biel/Bienne (SUI)	Canada	3–1	Won
2021	Finals, Group D	2 November	Prague (CZE)	Germany	3–0	Won
2021	Finals, Group D	4 November	Prague (CZE)	Czech Republic	2–1	Won
2021	Finals, Semifinal	5 November	Prague (CZE)	Australia	2–0	Won
2021	Finals, Final	6 November	Prague (CZE)	(Russia) RTF	0–2	Lost
2022	Finals, Group A	9 November	Glasgow (GBR)	Italy	3–0	Won
2022	Finals, Group A	11 November	Glasgow (GBR)	Canada	2–1	Won
2022	Finals, Semifinal	12 November	Glasgow (GBR)	Czech Republic	2–0	Won
2022	Finals, Final	13 November	Glasgow (GBR)	Australia	2–0	Won

== See also ==
- Billie Jean King Cup
- Switzerland Davis Cup team
- Switzerland at the Hopman Cup
