= Eric Minkin =

American-Israeli basketball player (1950–2025)

Eric Minkin אריק מנקין
Personal information
- Born: November 28, 1950
- Died: March 25, 2025 (aged 74) Sarasota, Florida, U.S.
- Listed height: 6 ft 7 in (2.01 m)

Career information
- High school: Germantown Academy (Fort Washington, Pennsylvania)
- College: Davidson (1969–1972)
- NBA draft: 1972: undrafted
- Position: Center

Career highlights
- EuroLeague champion (1977); 2× Second-team All-SoCon (1971, 1972)

Eric Minkin (Hebrew: אריק מנקין; November 28, 1950 – March 25, 2025) was an American-Israeli basketball player. He played the center position. He played in the Israeli Basketball Premier League, and for the Israel national team.

== Biography ==
Minkin was 6 ft 7 in (201 cm) tall, and was Jewish.

He attended Germantown Academy ('68), where in basketball Minkin was a three-time Philadelphia High School Inter-Academic League First-Teamer, from 1966-68. Minkin scored 1,358 career points for the school—at the time, the school record.

Minkin played basketball for Team USA in the 1969 Maccabiah Games in Israel. Others playing on the team included Andrew Hill, Steve Kaplan, and Neal Walk.

He attended Davidson College (BA, Political Science and Government, 1972), and played for the Davidson Wildcats from 1969 to 1972. In 1970–71 and 1971–72 Minkin was Second Team All-Southern Conference. He graduated as a First Team Jewish All-American.

Minkin played in the Israeli Basketball Premier League for Maccabi Tel Aviv and Hapoel Galil Elyon. He was part of the Maccabi Tel Aviv Israeli team that in the 1976–77 FIBA European Champions Cup (EuroLeague) semifinals defeated CSKA Moscow — the Red Army team—in a dramatic upset. He recalled: “I drove myself to play better than everybody else. I was the smallest, whitest center in Europe. What choice did I have?”

He also played for the Israel national team in the 1979 FIBA European Championship for Men.

Minkin was a resident of Sarasota, Florida. He died there on March 25, 2025, at the age of 74. Prior to his death, he had worked for 22 years as a registered nurse in Sarasota Memorial Hospital’s cardiac acute unit.
