= Yale Bulldogs men's basketball =

College men's basketball team representing Yale University

2026–27 Yale Bulldogs men's basketball team
- University: Yale University
- First season: 1896; 130 years ago
- Head coach: James Jones (27th season)
- Location: New Haven, Connecticut, U.S.
- Arena: Payne Whitney Gymnasium (capacity: 2,532)
- Conference: Ivy League
- Nickname: Bulldogs
- Colors: Yale blue and white
- Student section: TBD

NCAA Division I tournament Elite Eight
- 1949
Other NCAA Division I tournament results
Appearances	1949, 1957, 1962, 2016, 2019, 2022, 2024, 2025

Pre-tournament Helms national champions
- 1901, 1903

Conference tournament champions
- 2019, 2022, 2024, 2025

Conference regular-season champions
- 1902, 1903, 1907, 1915, 1917, 1923, 1933, 1949, 1957, 1962, 2002, 2015, 2016, 2019, 2020, 2023, 2025, 2026

Uniforms
Home	Away

The Yale Bulldogs men's basketball team represents Yale University in New Haven, Connecticut, competing in the Ivy League. The team plays home games in the John J. Lee Amphitheater of the Payne Whitney Gymnasium. The Bulldogs have reached the NCAA Division I men's basketball tournament eight times, most recently in 2025. The current head coach is James Jones.

== History ==
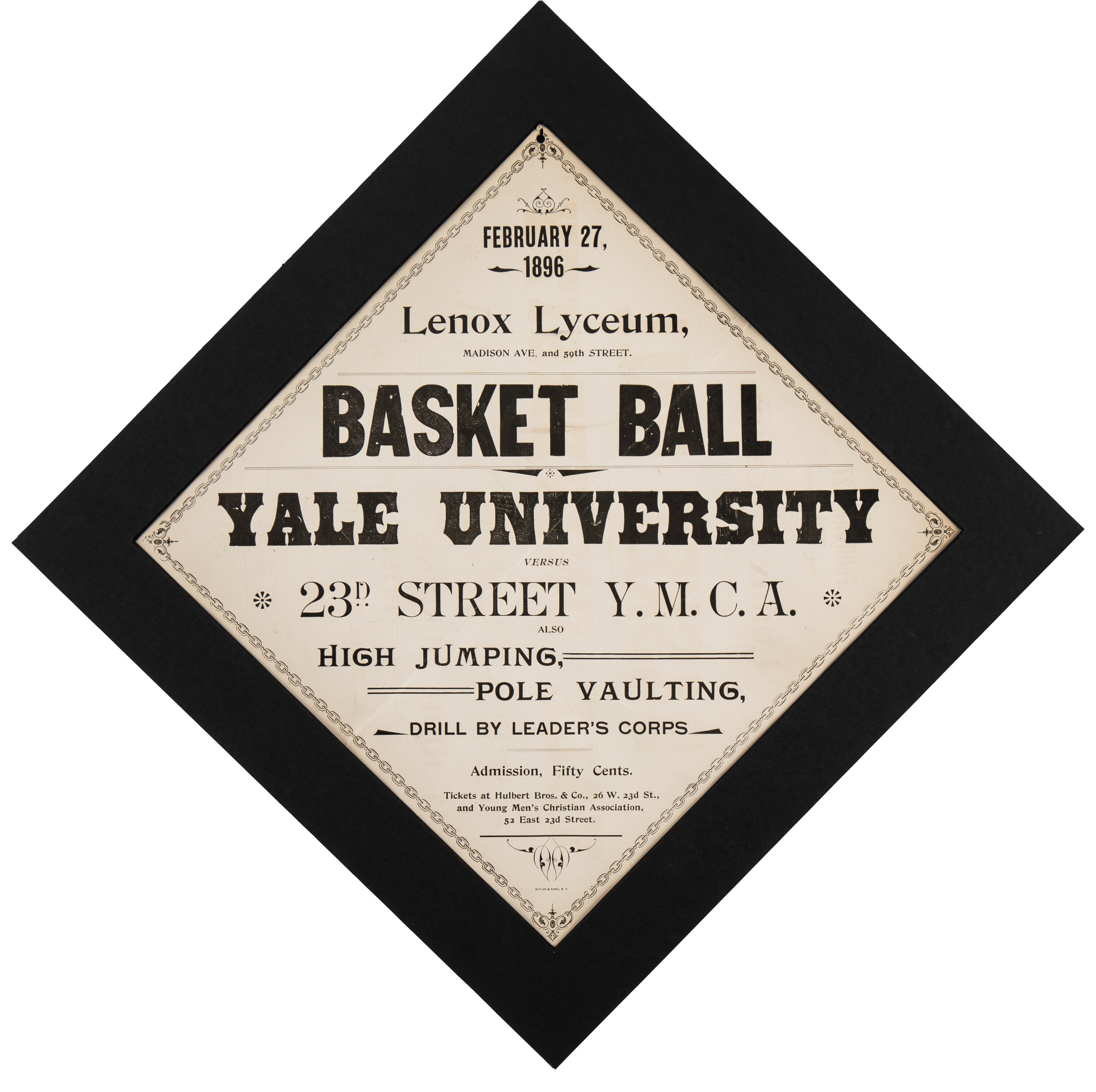
Advertisement for a game in 1896

Yale was retroactively designated as a national champion on two occasions for seasons played during the pre-NCAA tournament era. The Helms Athletic Foundation, an organization that retroactively selected champions beginning with the 1900–01 season, named Yale as the national champion in 1901 and 1903. The Premo-Porretta Power Poll, a retroactive ranking system started after the 1895–96 season, designated Yale as the top team in 1896, 1897, 1899, and 1900. These designations were named by two unofficial selectors and are not officially recognized by the NCAA.

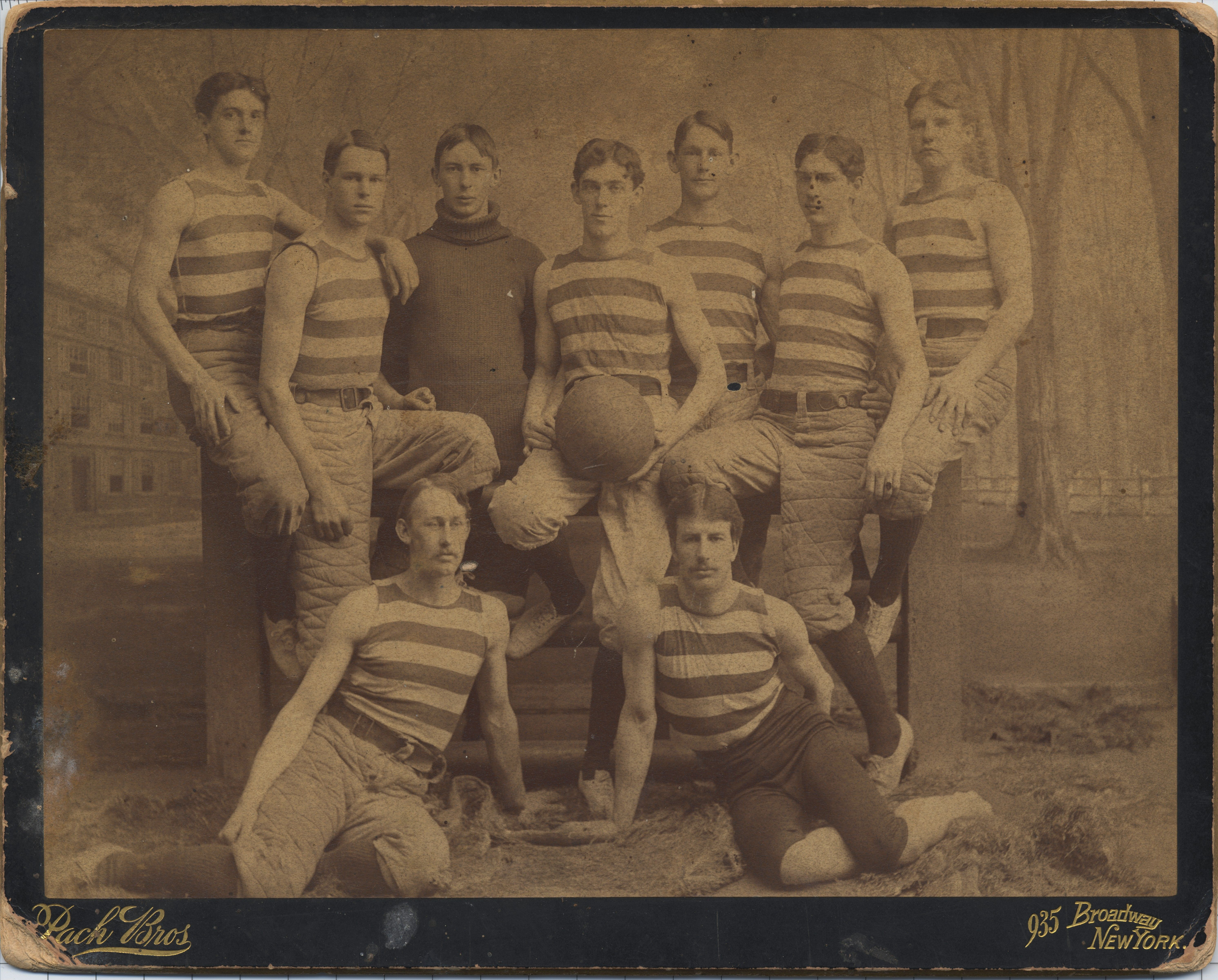
Yale team of 1896–97

Penn and Yale played in the first college basketball game with five men on a team in 1897.

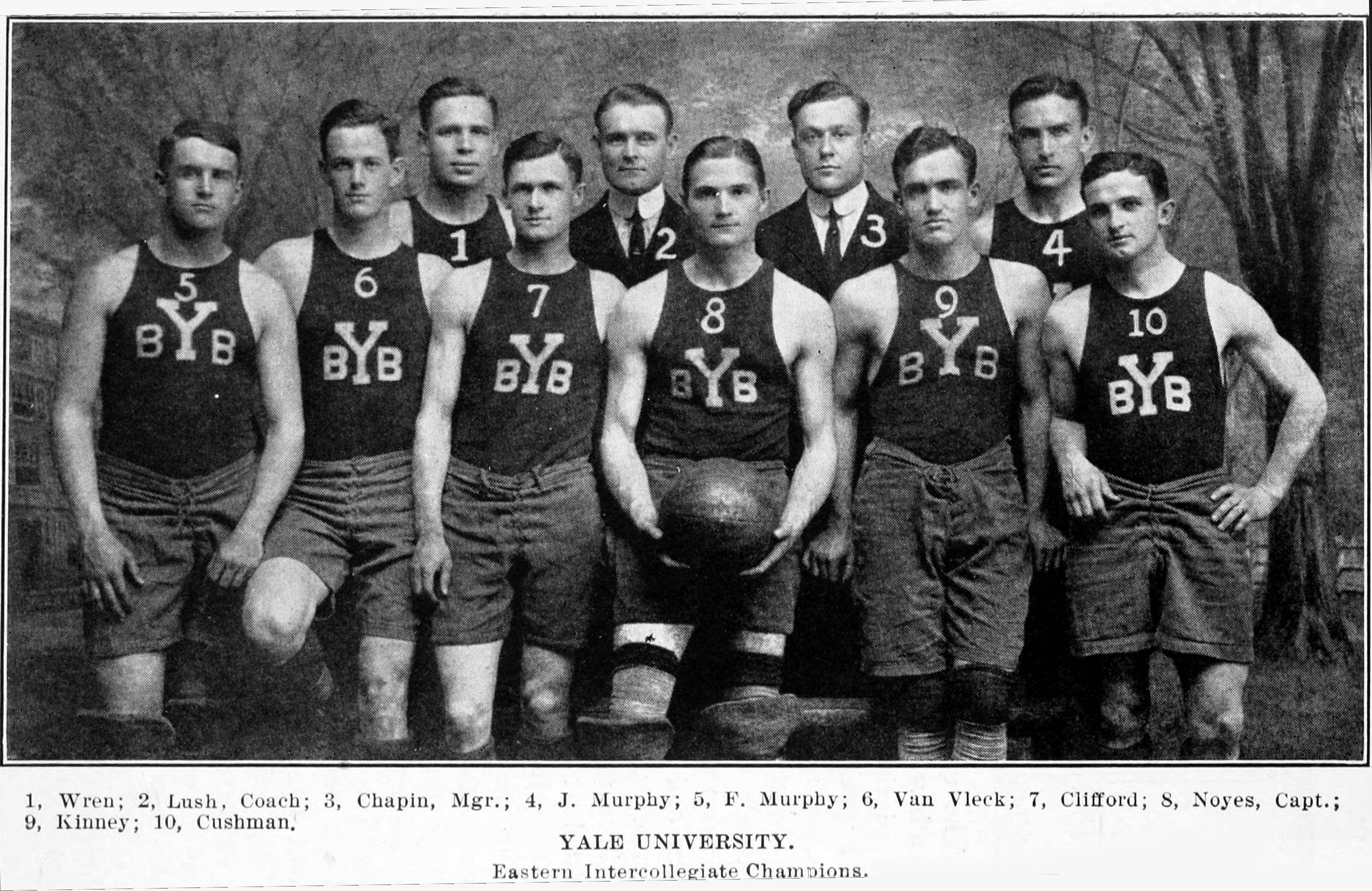
Yale team of 1906–07

In 1969—against the wishes of the NCAA—Yale Jewish center Jack Langer played for Team United States at the 1969 Maccabiah Games in Israel. He did so with the approval of Yale President Kingman Brewster. The university said it would not stop him from "what we feel is a matter of religious freedom," and all Ivy League presidents fully endorsed Yale's stand. After that, Yale played Langer in basketball games the following season. A special assistant to the President of Yale, Henry Chauncey, Jr., said: "There is no question that Jack Langer will continue to play basketball. We don't care what they do - Jack Langer will play when the coach wants to use him." On January 15, 1970, the NCAA Council placed Yale University on two‐year "full athletic probation" in all sports. It thereby restricted Yale teams and athletes (not just basketball players) for two years from competing in NCAA tournaments, championships and other postseason competitions and from receiving any monies for televised events. The decision impacted 300 Yale students, every Yale student on its sports teams, over the next two years.

The Presidents of the other seven Ivy League schools issued a statement condemning the NCAA's actions regarding the "Langer Case." The Harvard Crimson called the probation "unjust but intolerable," and urged the Ivy League to withdraw from the NCAA. Harvard track and field captain Ed Nosal and two other Harvard athletes, sympathetic to Langer and Yale and disdainful of the absurdity of the NCAA rule, protested at the 1970 NCAA Indoor Track and Field Championships by standing on the awards stand wearing blue Yale jerseys. In February 1970, Representative Robert N. Giaimo (D-Connecticut) said in the U.S. Congress:

The Yale case, involving basketball player Jack Langer, is tragic. It shows that the NCAA is willing to use any weapon in its continuing power struggle with the Amateur Athletic Union. It shows that the NCAA does not care if it hurts member institutions or individual athletes in the process. It shows once again that the NCAA is ... under the control of a stubborn, dictatorial hierarchy that does not hesitate to use athletes and schools alike as mere pawns in a game of power politics.

In 1986-87, Chris Dudley led the Ivy League with 13.3 rebounds per game and 2.8 blocks per game.

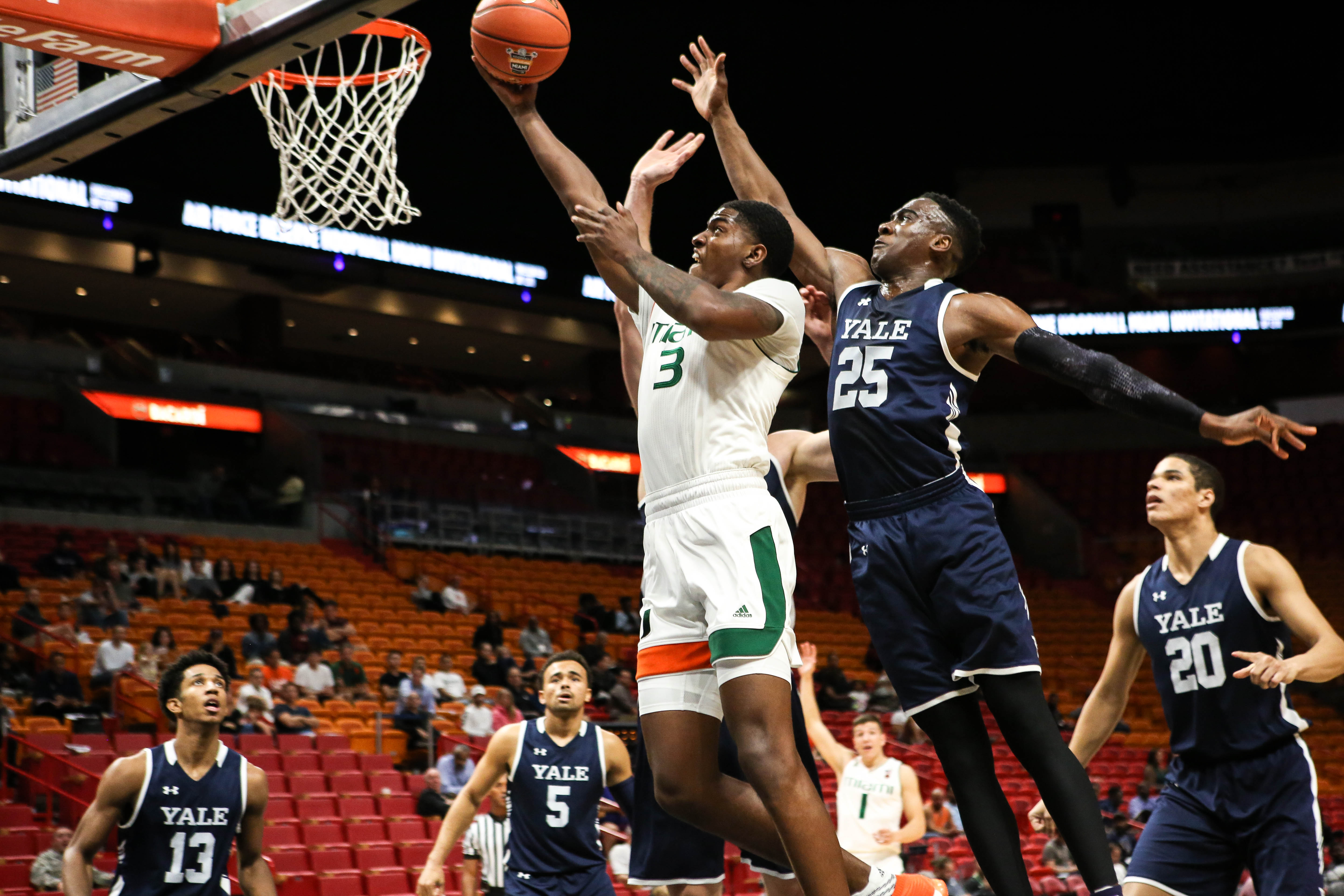
Yale v Miami game in 2018

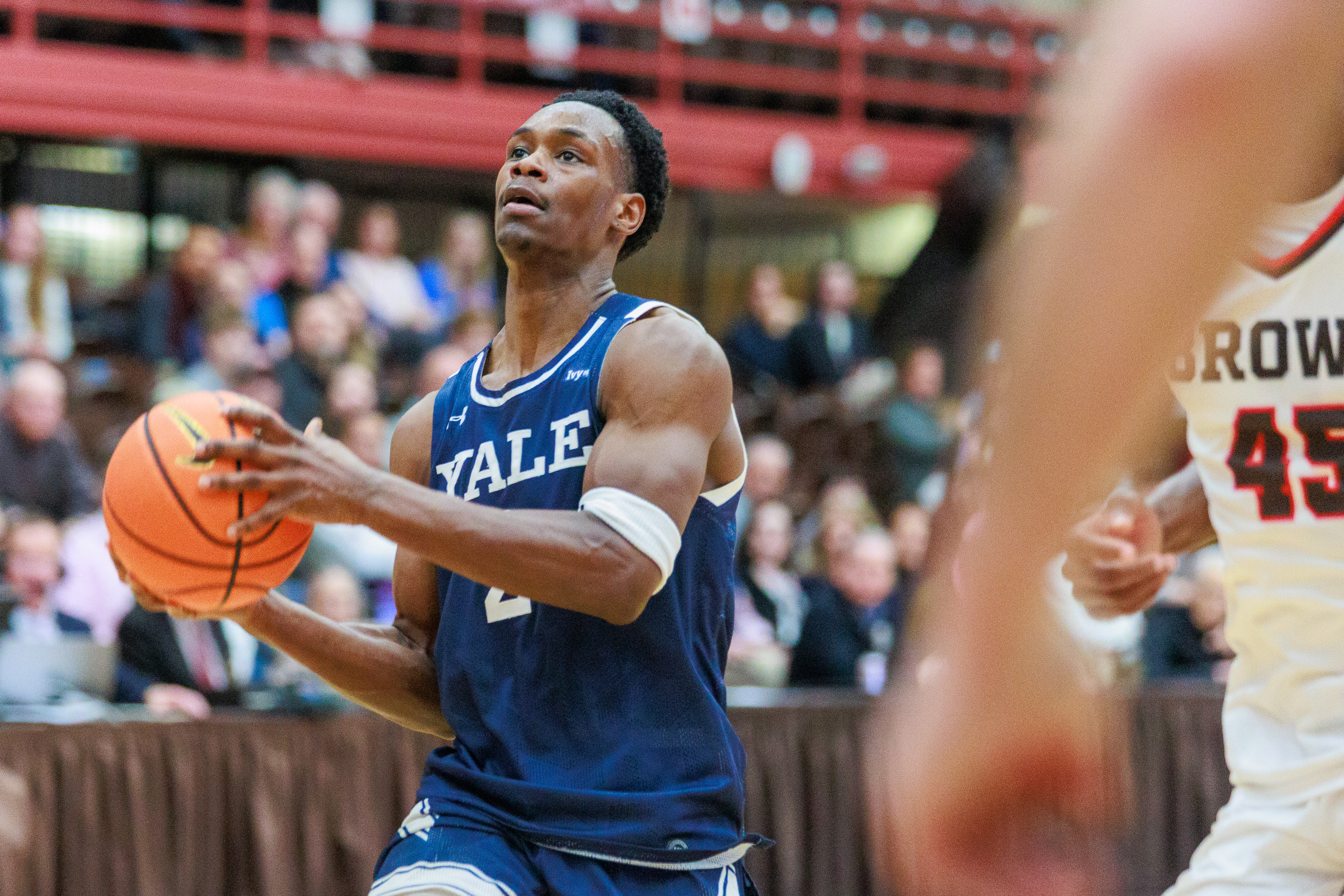
Bez Mbeng in 2025

Yale has won seven Ivy League championships – 1957, 1962, 1963, 2002, 2016, 2019, 2020, 2022, 2024, and 2025. It also won the Eastern Intercollegiate Basketball League, the forerunner to the Ivy League, eight times – 1902, 1903, 1907, 1915, 1917, 1923, 1933 and 1949. The Bulldogs captured the first official Ivy League title in 1957, finishing 12–2 and losing to eventual national champion North Carolina, 90–74, in the NCAA East Regional. The 1962 club finished 13–1 in Ivy play but lost overtime to Wake Forest, 92–82, in the East Regional. The 1963 team tied Princeton for the Ivy title with an 11–3 record but fell to the Tigers in a playoff, 65–53. In 2002, the Bulldogs were part of the first three-way tie in Ivy history.

Yale beat Princeton 76–60 in the first Ivy playoff game but fell to Penn 77–58 to determine the NCAA berth. In 2015, Yale tied Harvard for the Ivy title with an 11–3 record, with a playoff between the two to determine the NCAA automatic bid. Harvard won that playoff game at the Palestra in Philadelphia on March 14, 2015, with a score of 53–51, thus preventing Yale from reaching the NCAA tournament in which the Bulldogs had not appeared in 53 years. The Bulldogs won the Ivy League championship outright in 2016 with a 13–1 conference record to advance to the NCAA Tournament for the first time in 54 years.

The team has appeared in eight NCAA Tournaments overall (in 1949, 1957, 1962, 2016, 2019, 2022, 2024, and 2025). On March 17, 2016, Yale defeated the Baylor Bears 79–75 in the first round of the NCAA Tournament for the school's first Tournament victory. In 2019 Yale beat Harvard, 97–85 to win its first Ivy League Men's Basketball Tournament. Yale won its second Ivy League Men's Basketball Tournament in 2022 when, on March 12, the #2 seed Yale outlasted the #3 seed University of Pennsylvania, with a score of 66–64. On March 22, 2024, Yale took down the 4th seeded Auburn as a 13.5 point underdog to once again pull the shocker.

In 2023–24, the Yale’s Danny Wolf led the Ivy League with 310 rebounds, 247 defensive rebounds, 9.7 rebounds per game, and 1.3 blocks per game. He finished the year averaging 14.1 points per game (10th in the league), with 43 blocks (second), 63 offensive rebounds (third), 176 field goals (third), a .472 field goal percentage (fourth), and 33 steals (tenth). He earned unanimous first team All-Ivy honors, a National Association of Basketball Coaches District 13 first-team selection, was named the most outstanding player in the Ivy League tournament, and was named Academic All-District.

== Postseason history ==
=== NCAA tournament results ===
Yale has appeared in the NCAA tournament eight times. The Bulldogs' combined record is 2–9.

Year	Seed	Round	Opponent	Result
1949		Elite Eight; Regional Third Place	Illinois; Villanova	L 67–71; L 67–78
1957		First Round	North Carolina	L 74–90
1962		First Round	Wake Forest	L 82–92^{OT}
2016	#12	First Round; Second Round	#5 Baylor #4 Duke	W 79–75; L 64–71
2019	#14	First Round	#3 LSU	L 74–79
2022	#14	First Round	#3 Purdue	L 56–78
2024	#13	First Round; Second Round	#4 Auburn #5 San Diego State	W 78–76; L 57–85
2025	#13	First Round	#4 Texas A&M	L 71–80

=== NIT results ===
Yale has been to the National Invitation Tournament (NIT) thrice. Their record is 1–3.

Year	Round	Opponent	Result
2002	First Round; Second Round	Rutgers; Tennessee Tech	W 67–65; L 61–80
2023	First Round	Vanderbilt	L 62–71
2026	First Round	UNCW	L 67–68

=== CIT results ===
Yale has been to the CollegeInsider.com Tournament (CIT) twice. Their combined record is 4–2.

Year	Round	Opponent	Result
2012	First Round	Fairfield	L 56–68
2014	First Round; Second Round; Quarterfinals; Semi-finals; Final	Quinnipiac; Holy Cross; Columbia; VMI; Murray State	W 69–68; W 71–66; W 72–69; W 75–62; L 57–65

== Notable players ==
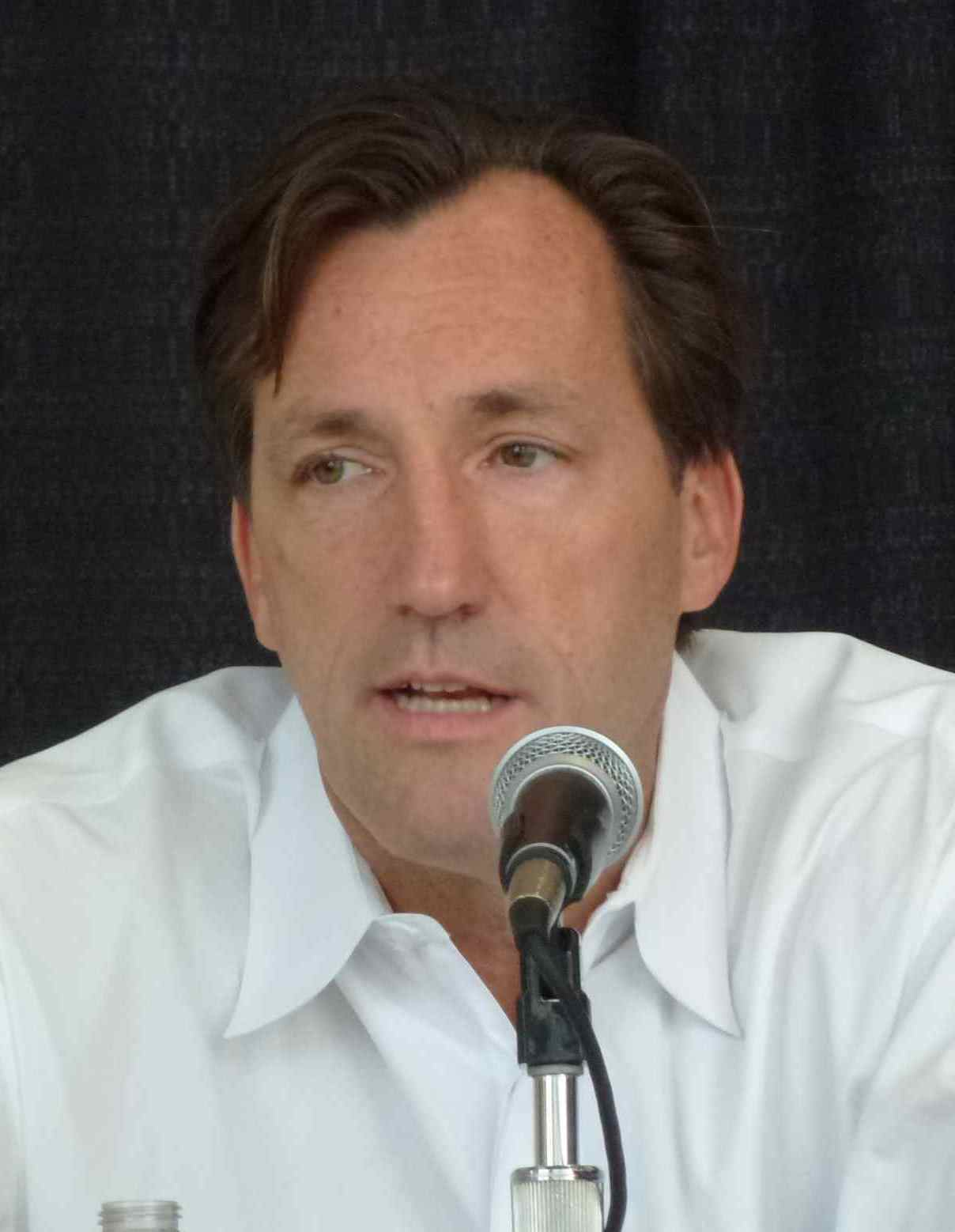
Chris Dudley

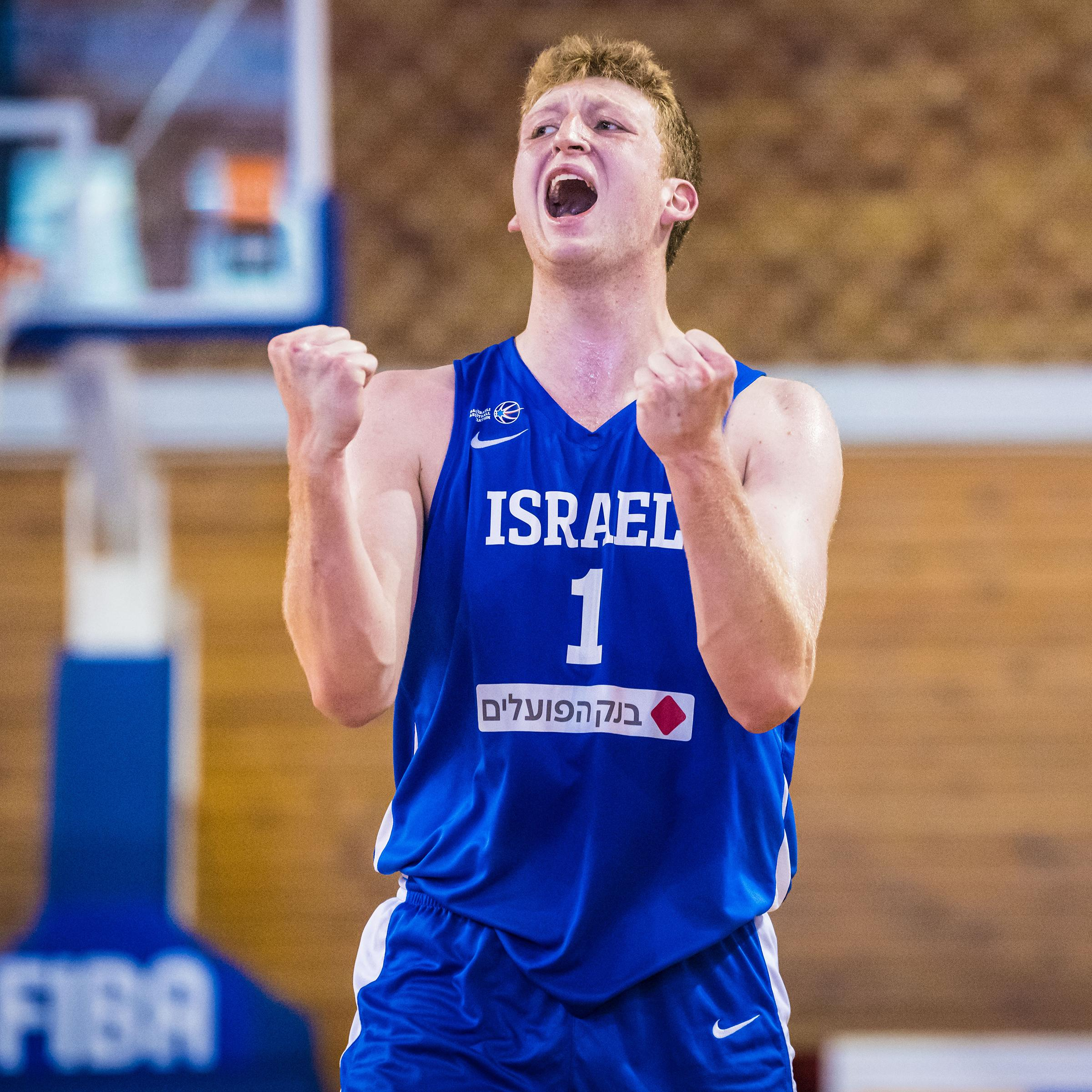
Danny Wolf

- Paul Atkinson (born 1999)
- Albie Booth (1908–1959)
- Chris Dudley (born 1965)
- Earl G. Graves Jr. (born 1962)
- Gilmore Kinney (1886–1916)
- Orson Kinney (1894–1966)
- Jack Langer (born 1948/1949)
- Tony Lavelli (1926–1998)
- Paul Maley (born 1966)
- Greg Mangano (born 1989)
- Bez Mbeng (born 2003)
- Miye Oni (born 1997)
- John Poulakidas (born 2003)
- Justin Sears (born 1994)
- Danny Wolf (born 2004)
