= Leaside Invitation =

Defunct tennis tournament
- Tour: ILTF World Circuit (1954–70)
- Founded: 1954; 71 years ago
- Abolished: 1970; 55 years ago
- Location: Toronto, Canada
- Venue: Leaside Tennis Club
- Surface: Clay/outdoor

The Leaside Invitation was a men's and women's open international clay court tennis tournament was founded in 1954. The tournament was first played at the Leaside Tennis Club, Toronto, Canada. It was played annually till 1970.

== History ==
In 1948 the Leaside Tennis Club was founded. In 1954 the club organised an open international tennis tournament called the Leaside Invitation. It was played annually till 1970.

== Finals ==
=== Men's singles ===
(incomplete roll)

Year	Winners	Runners-up	Score
1954	(Canada) Jim Bentley	(Canada) Donald Platt.	6–2, 9–7, 8–6.
1955	(South Africa) Reyno Summers	(Canada) Stanley Griffin	6–2, 10–8, 6–0.
1965	(Australia) Andy Zeltins	(United States) Tony Wedgbury	4–6, 6–3, 6–2, 6–3.
↓ Open era ↓
1969	(Canada) Keith Carpenter	(Canada) Bruce James	6–1, 6–2.
1970	(Canada) Harry Fauquier	(Canada) Peter Burwash	7–5, 6–2.

=== Women's singles ===
(incomplete roll)

Year	Winners	Runners-up	Score
1955	(Czechoslovakia) Hilde Doleschell	(Canada) Louise Brown	6–2, 9–7
1957	(Canada) Louise Brown	(Czechoslovakia) Hilde Doleschell	1–6, 6–0, 8–6
1964	(Brazil) Mary Habicht	(United States) Alice Tym	6–2, 9–7
1966	(Canada) Benita Senn	(Canada) Louise Brown	1–6, 6–3, 6–4
1967	(Canada) Faye Urban	(Japan) Hiroko Kosaka	6–2, 6–4
1968	(Canada) Faye Urban	(Canada) Vicki Berner	7–5, 6–0
↓ Open era ↓
1969	(Canada) Vivienne Strong	(Canada) Benita Senn	2–6, 6–2, 6–1.
1970	(Canada) Benita Senn	(Canada) Louise Brown	6–1, 6–3
