= Walter Byers =

American basketball player and executive

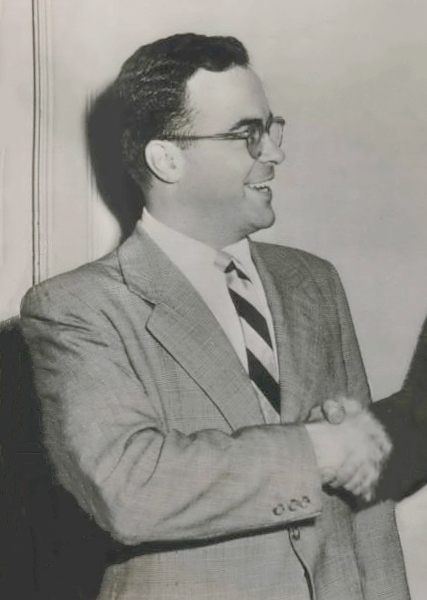
Byers in 1951

Walter Byers (March 13, 1922 – May 26, 2015) was an American sports executive and sportswriter. He was the first executive director of the National Collegiate Athletic Association.

== Early life ==
Byers was born in Kansas City. He graduated from Westport High School. He never played athletics, and though he took classes at the University of Iowa, he did not graduate from college.

== Career ==
Byers began his career as a United Press reporter. He left wire service journalism to take a job as an assistant sports information director with the Big Ten Conference.

In 1951 Byers was a 29-year-old former Big Ten assistant sports-information director who had never headed anything. That year, Byers was appointed the first executive director of the National Collegiate Athletic Association, a job that did not have a description.

He served from 1951 to 1988. He urged the creation of the United States Basketball Writers Association in 1956. Byers helped expand the NCAA men's basketball tournament in from 8 to 16 teams. Byers negotiated TV contracts that preempted individual colleges' rights on the way to building a billion-dollar business, leading to a 1984 U.S. Supreme Court ruling that freed the colleges to negotiate on their own.

In 1970 the NCAA -- in a decision in which Byers was involved -- banned Yale from participating in all NCAA sports for two years. The decision was made in reaction to Yale -- against the wishes of Byers and the NCAA -- playing its Jewish center Jack Langer in college games after Langer had played for Team United States at the 1969 Maccabiah Games in Israel with the approval of Yale President Kingman Brewster. The decision impacted 300 Yale students, every Yale student on its sports teams, over the next two years.

Byers famously disliked University of Nevada-Las Vegas basketball coach Jerry Tarkanian, with whom he was very much at odds, and said "Tark’s black players play a fast city-lot basketball without much style. Grab ball and run like hell, not lots of passing to set up the shots.” He described U.N.L.V.’s style as “ghetto run-and-shoot basketball” with little concern for defense. Coincidentally, Tarkanian died less than four months before Byers.

The New York Times said that Byers was sometimes known as "That power-mad Walter Byers," and described him as "secretive, despotic, stubborn and ruthless." WFAN talk show host Mike Francesa referred to him as an "Oz-like" figure who ran the NCAA with ultimate control. The Harvard Crimson described him as "power-mad." Byers was also described as a "petty tyrant." The Chicago Sun-Times described his "reign" as "near-dictatorial," and The Washington Post likewise described him as a dictator.

=== Book ===
In his book Unsportsmanlike Conduct: Exploiting College Athletes Byers turned against the NCAA. He said it developed the term "student-athlete" in order to insulate the colleges from having to provide long-term disability payments to players injured while playing their sport (and making money for their university and the NCAA). Byers said that Congress should enact a "comprehensive College Athletes' Bill of Rights." He said that "the federal government should require deregulation of a monopoly business operated by not-for-profit institutions contracting together to achieve maximum financial returns... Collegiate amateurism is... an economic camouflage for monopoly practice. . . , [one which] 'operat[es] an air-tight racket of supplying cheap athletic labor.'"

== Death ==
Byers died on May 26, 2015.

== See also ==
- College Football Association
- Walter Byers Scholarship
