= 1964 Federation Cup (tennis) =

International women's tennis competition

Details
- Duration: 1 – 5 September
- Edition: 2nd

Champion
- Winning nation: Australia

The 1964 Federation Cup was the second edition of what is now known as the Fed Cup. 20 nations participated in the tournament, which was held at the Germantown Cricket Club in Philadelphia, Pennsylvania, United States, from 1–5 September. Australia won the title, defeating defending champions United States in the final.

== Participating teams ==
Participating Teams
Argentina	Australia	Austria	Belgium	Canada
Czechoslovakia	Denmark	France	Great Britain	Italy
Ireland	Japan	Mexico	Netherlands	Norway
South Africa	Sweden	Switzerland	United States	West Germany

== Draw ==
All ties were played at the Germantown Cricket Club in Philadelphia, Pennsylvania, United States on grass courts.

First Round; 1 September
France	3
Switzerland	0
Austria	1
Netherlands	2
Czechoslovakia	3
Mexico	0
South Africa	3
Japan	0

Second Round; 2 September
Australia	3
Denmark	0
Canada	2
Sweden	1
West Germany	3
Italy	0
France	2
Netherlands	1
Czechoslovakia	1
South Africa	2
Norway	0
Great Britain	3
Belgium	0
Argentina	3
Ireland	0
United States	3

Quarterfinals; 3 September
Australia	3
Canada	0
West Germany	1
France	2
South Africa	1
Great Britain	2
Argentina	0
United States	3

Semifinals; 4 September
Australia	3
France	0
Great Britain	0
United States	3

Finals; 5 September
Australia	2
United States	1

=== First round ===
France vs. Switzerland

France
3
Germantown Cricket Club, Philadelphia, PA, United States
1 September 1964
Grass

Switzerland
0

			1	2	3
1	(France) (Switzerland)	Françoise Dürr; Alice Wavre	6; 3	6; 2
2	(France) (Switzerland)	Jacqueline Rees-Lewis; Anne-Marie Studer	6; 2	6; 3
3	(France) (Switzerland)	Françoise Dürr / Janine Lieffrig; Anne-Marie Studer / Alice Wavre	8; 6	6; 2

Austria vs. Netherlands

Austria
1
Germantown Cricket Club, Philadelphia, PA, United States
1 September 1964
Grass

Netherlands
2

			1	2	3
1	(Austria) (Netherlands)	Andrea Winkler; Gertruida Groenman	3; 6	6; 1	1; 6
2	(Austria) (Netherlands)	Monika Hassmann; Betty Stöve	1; 6	6; 2	6; 2
3	(Austria) (Netherlands)	Monika Hassmann / Andrea Winkler; Gertruida Groenman / Betty Stöve	2; 6	0; 6

Czechoslovakia vs. Mexico

Czechoslovakia
3
Germantown Cricket Club, Philadelphia, PA, United States
1 September 1964
Grass

Mexico
0

			1	2	3
1	(Czechoslovakia) (Mexico)	Jitka Horčičková; Antonia Prado	6; 4	6; 1
2	(Czechoslovakia) (Mexico)	Vlasta Kodesová; Patricia Reyes	6; 3	4; 6	6; 2
3	(Czechoslovakia) (Mexico)	Jitka Horčičková / Vlasta Kodesová; Antonia Prado / Patricia Reyes	6; 4	6; 1

South Africa vs. Japan

South Africa
3
Germantown Cricket Club, Philadelphia, PA, United States
1 September 1964
Grass

Japan
0

			1	2	3
1	(South Africa) (Japan)	Annette Van Zyl; Reiko Miyagi	6; 2	6; 3
2	(South Africa) (Japan)	Glenda Swan; Kazuko Kuromatsu	6; 0	7; 5
3	(South Africa) (Japan)	Glenda Swan / Annette Van Zyl; Reiko Miyagi / Yohko Obata	6; 4	6; 0

=== Second round ===
Australia vs. Denmark

Australia
3
Germantown Cricket Club, Philadelphia, PA, United States
2 September 1964
Grass

Denmark
0

			1	2	3
1	(Australia) (Denmark)	Margaret Smith; Pia Balling	6; 2	6; 1
2	(Australia) (Denmark)	Lesley Turner; Ulla Pontoppidan	6; 1	6; 1
3	(Australia) (Denmark)	Robyn Ebbern / Margaret Smith; Pia Balling / Ulla Pontoppidan	6; 0	6; 1

Canada vs. Sweden

Canada
2
Germantown Cricket Club, Philadelphia, United States
2 September 1964
Grass

Sweden
1

			1	2	3
1	(Canada) (Sweden)	Benita Senn; Katarina Bartholdson	1; 6	3; 6
2	(Canada) (Sweden)	Vicki Berner; Ulla Sandulf	6; 3	6; 4
3	(Canada) (Sweden)	Vicki Berner / Louise Brown; Katarina Bartholdson / Ulla Sandulf	6; 3	6; 3

West Germany vs. Italy

West Germany
3
Germantown Cricket Club, Philadelphia, PA, United States
2 September 1964
Grass

Italy
0

			1	2	3
1	(West Germany) (Italy)	Helga Hösl; Maria Teresa Riedl	6; 4	7; 5
2	(West Germany) (Italy)	Heide Schildknecht; Francesca Gordigiani	6; 4	6; 4
3	(West Germany) (Italy)	Helga Hösl / Heide Schildknecht; Francesca Gordigiani / Maria Teresa Riedl	6; 4	6; 2

France vs. Netherlands

France
2
Germantown Cricket Club, Philadelphia, PA, United States
2 September 1964
Grass

Netherlands
1

			1	2	3
1	(France) (Netherlands)	Françoise Dürr; Gertruida Groenman	4; 6	6; 3	6; 3
2	(France) (Netherlands)	Jacqueline Rees-Lewis; Betty Stöve	4; 6	6; 3	4; 6
3	(France) (Netherlands)	Françoise Dürr / Janine Lieffrig; Gertruida Groenman / Betty Stöve	12; 10	6; 3

Czechoslovakia vs. South Africa

Czechoslovakia
1
Germantown Cricket Club, Philadelphia, PA, United States
2 September 1964
Grass

South Africa
2

			1	2	3
1	(Czechoslovakia) (South Africa)	Jitka Horčičková; Annette Van Zyl	2; 6	4; 6
2	(Czechoslovakia) (South Africa)	Vlasta Kodesová; Glenda Swan	6; 4	9; 7
3	(Czechoslovakia) (South Africa)	Jitka Horčičková / Vlasta Kodesová; Glenda Swan / Annette Van Zyl	0; 6	2; 6

Norway vs. Great Britain

Norway
0
Germantown Cricket Club, Philadelphia, PA, United States
2 September 1964
Grass

Great Britain
3

			1	2	3
1	(Norway) (United Kingdom)	Liv Paldan; Ann Jones	1; 6	1; 6
2	(Norway) (United Kingdom)	Kirsten Robsahm; Deidre Catt	0; 6	8; 10
3	(Norway) (United Kingdom)	Liv Paldan / Kirsten Robsahm; Deidre Catt / Ann Jones	2; 6	2; 6

Belgium vs. Argentina

Belgium
0
Germantown Cricket Club, Philadelphia, PA, United States
2 September 1964
Grass

Argentina
3

			1	2	3
1	(Belgium) (Argentina)	Christiane Mercelis; Norma Baylon	6; 8	2; 6
2	(Belgium) (Argentina)	Monique Bedoret; Ana-Maria Bocio	1; 6	3; 6
3	(Belgium) (Argentina)	Monique Bedoret / Christiane Mercelis; Norma Baylon / Ana-Maria Bocio	6; 1	3; 6	3; 6

Ireland vs. United States

Ireland
0
Germantown Cricket Club, Philadelphia, PA, United States
2 September 1964
Grass

United States
3

			1	2	3
1	(Republic of Ireland) (United States)	Geraldine Houlihan; Billie Jean Moffitt	2; 6	2; 6
2	(Republic of Ireland) (United States)	Eleanor O'Neill; Nancy Richey	3; 6	2; 6
3	(Republic of Ireland) (United States)	Geraldine Houlihan / Eleanor O'Neill; Billie Jean Moffitt / Karen Susman	1; 6	2; 6

=== Quarterfinals ===
Australia vs. Canada

Australia
3
Germantown Cricket Club, Philadelphia, PA, United States
3 September 1964
Grass

Canada
0

			1	2	3
1	(Australia) (Canada)	Margaret Smith; Benita Senn	6; 1	6; 0
2	(Australia) (Canada)	Lesley Turner; Vicki Berner	6; 3	6; 1
3	(Australia) (Canada)	Margaret Smith / Lesley Turner; Vicki Berner / Louise Brown	6; 1	6; 2

West Germany vs. France

West Germany
1
Germantown Cricket Club, Philadelphia, PA, United States
3 September 1964
Grass

France
2

			1	2	3
1	(West Germany) (France)	Helga Hösl; Françoise Dürr	4; 6	2; 6
2	(West Germany) (France)	Heide Schildknecht; Jacqueline Rees-Lewis	6; 2	7; 5
3	(West Germany) (France)	Helga Hösl / Heide Schildknecht; Françoise Dürr / Janine Lieffrig	5; 7	3; 6

South Africa vs. Great Britain

South Africa
1
Germantown Cricket Club, Philadelphia, PA, United States
3 September 1964
Grass

Great Britain
2

			1	2	3
1	(South Africa) (United Kingdom)	Annette Van Zyl; Ann Jones	4; 6	7; 5	6; 5
2	(South Africa) (United Kingdom)	Glenda Swan; Deidre Catt	3; 6	1; 6
3	(South Africa) (United Kingdom)	Glenda Swan / Annette Van Zyl; Deidre Catt / Ann Jones	5; 7	6; 8

Argentina vs. United States

Argentina
0
Germantown Cricket Club, Philadelphia, PA, United States
3 September 1964
Grass

United States
3

			1	2	3
1	(Argentina) (United States)	Norma Baylon; Billie Jean Moffitt	10; 12	7; 9
2	(Argentina) (United States)	Ana-Maria Bocio; Nancy Richey	3; 6	2; 6
3	(Argentina) (United States)	Norma Baylon / Ana-Maria Bocio; Billie Jean Moffitt / Karen Susman	4; 6	1; 6

=== Semifinals ===
Australia vs. France

Australia
3
Germantown Cricket Club, Philadelphia, PA, United States
4 September 1964
Grass

France
0

			1	2	3
1	(Australia) (France)	Margaret Smith; Françoise Dürr	6; 4	6; 1
2	(Australia) (France)	Lesley Turner; Janine Lieffrig	6; 1	6; 2
3	(Australia) (France)	Margaret Smith / Lesley Turner; Françoise Dürr / Janine Lieffrig	6; 3	9; 7

United States vs. Great Britain

Great Britain
0
Germantown Cricket Club, Philadelphia, PA, United States
4 September 1964
Grass

United States
3

			1	2	3
1	(United Kingdom) (United States)	Ann Jones; Billie Jean Moffitt	4; 6	3; 6
2	(United Kingdom) (United States)	Deidre Catt; Nancy Richey	4; 6	3; 6
3	(United Kingdom) (United States)	Deidre Catt / Ann Jones; Billie Jean Moffitt / Karen Susman	1; 6	3; 6

=== Final ===
Australia vs. United States

Australia
2
Germantown Cricket Club, Philadelphia, PA, United States
5 September 1964
Grass

United States
1

			1	2	3
1	(Australia) (United States)	Margaret Smith; Billie Jean Moffitt	6; 2	6; 3
2	(Australia) (United States)	Lesley Turner; Nancy Richey	7; 5	6; 1
3	(Australia) (United States)	Margaret Smith / Lesley Turner; Billie Jean Moffitt / Karen Susman	6; 4	5; 7	1; 6
