= List of Canada Fed Cup team representatives =

This is a list of tennis players who have represented the Canada Fed Cup team in an official Fed Cup match. Canada have taken part in the competition since 1963.

== Fed Cup players ==
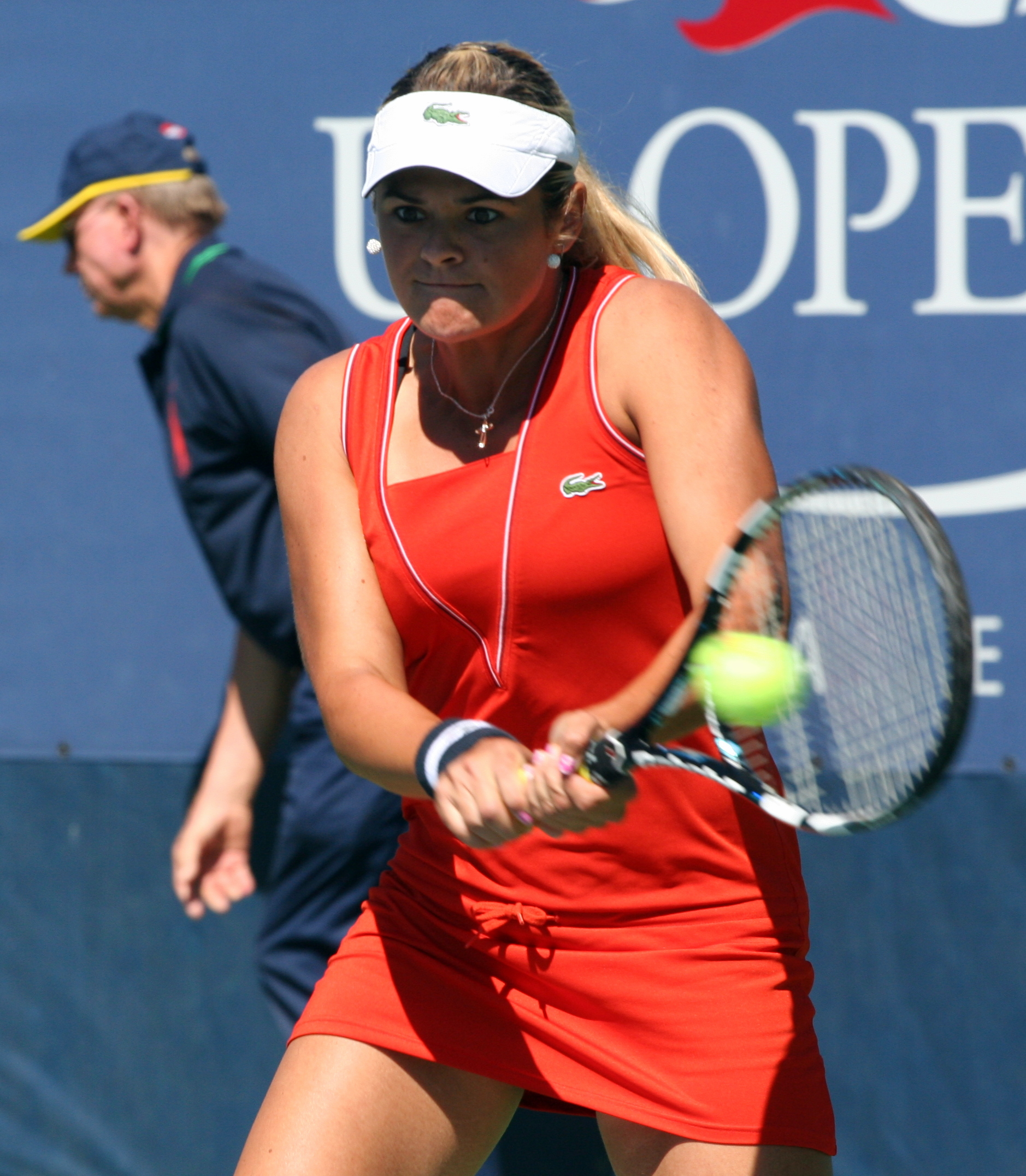
Aleksandra Wozniak

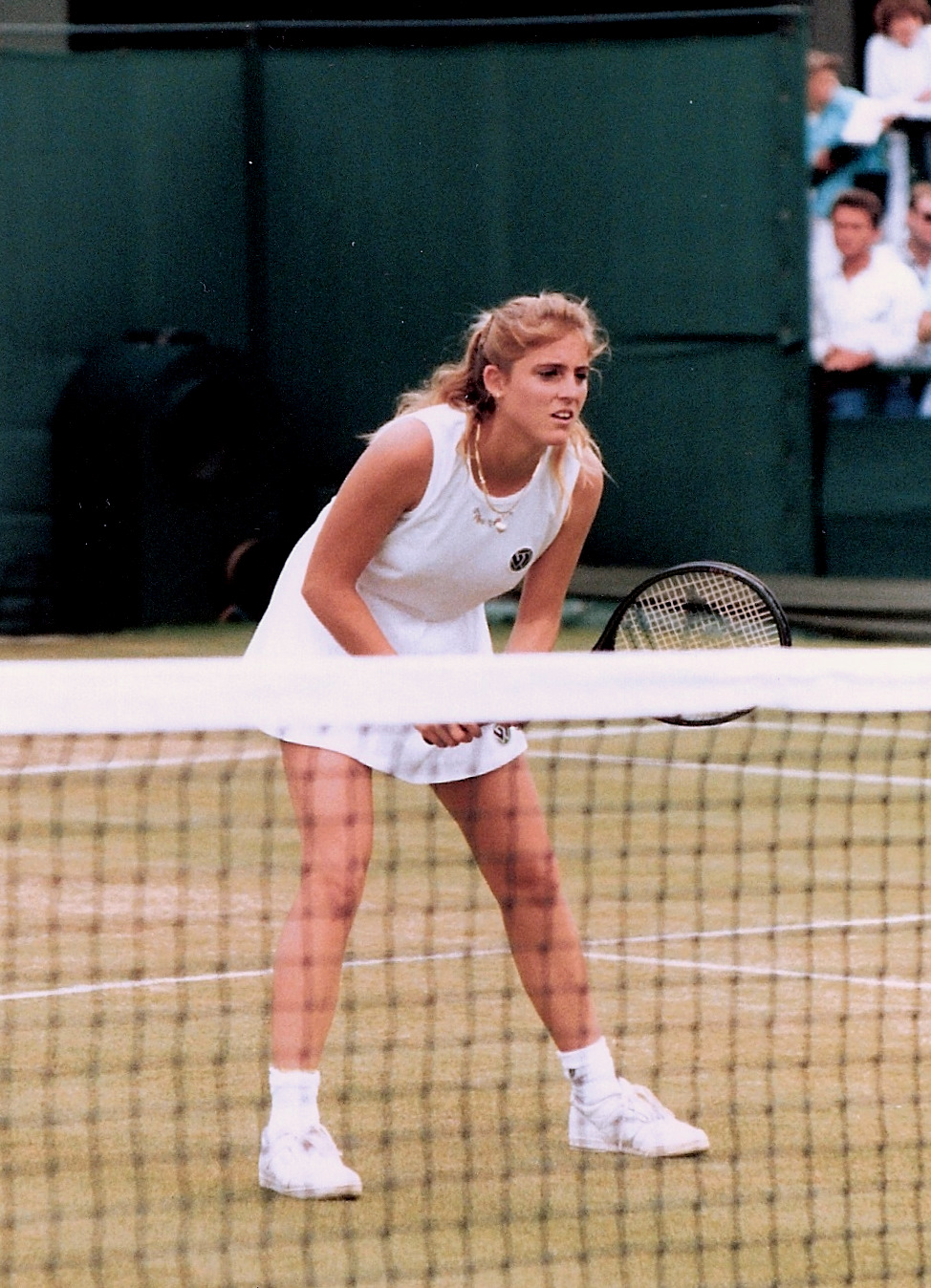
Carling Bassett-Seguso

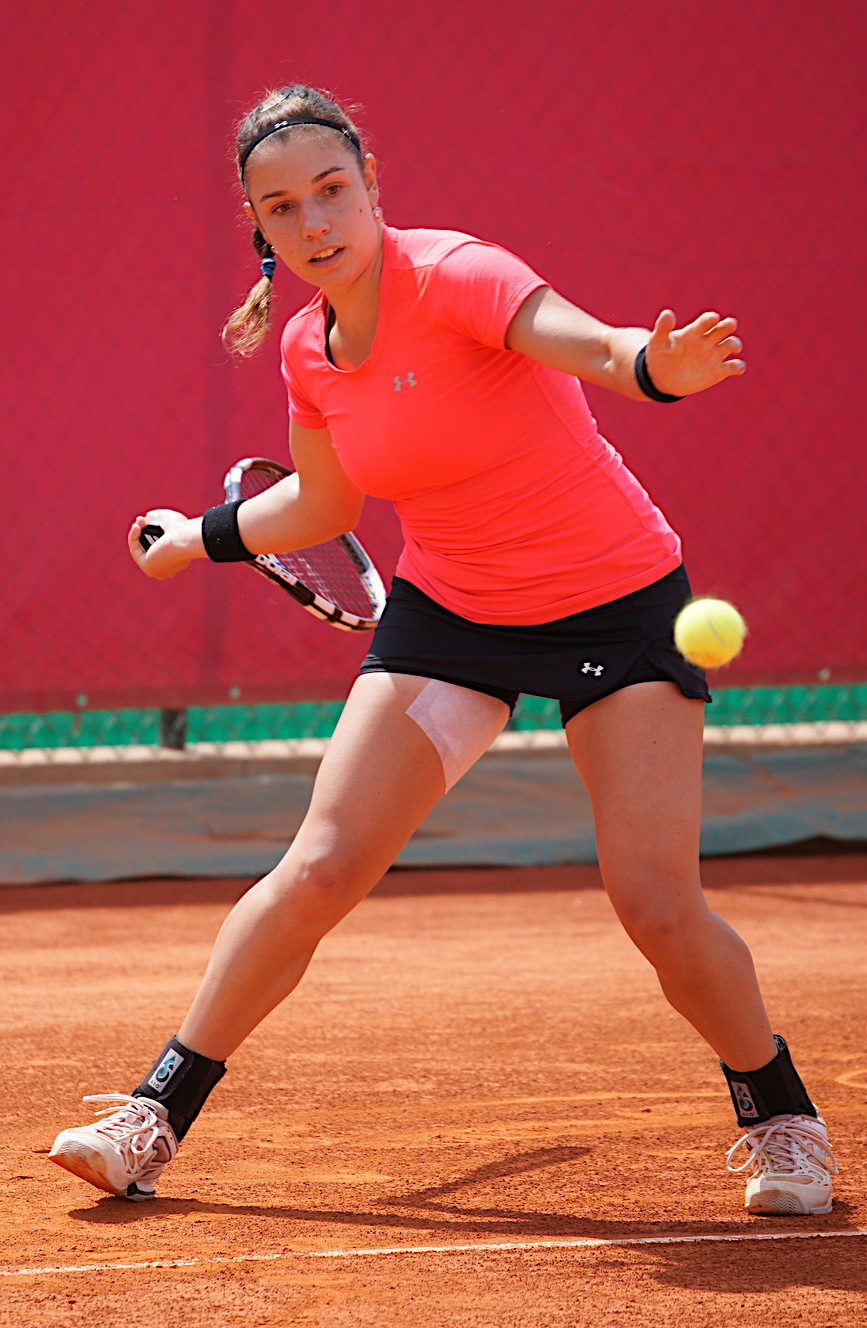
Sharon Fichman

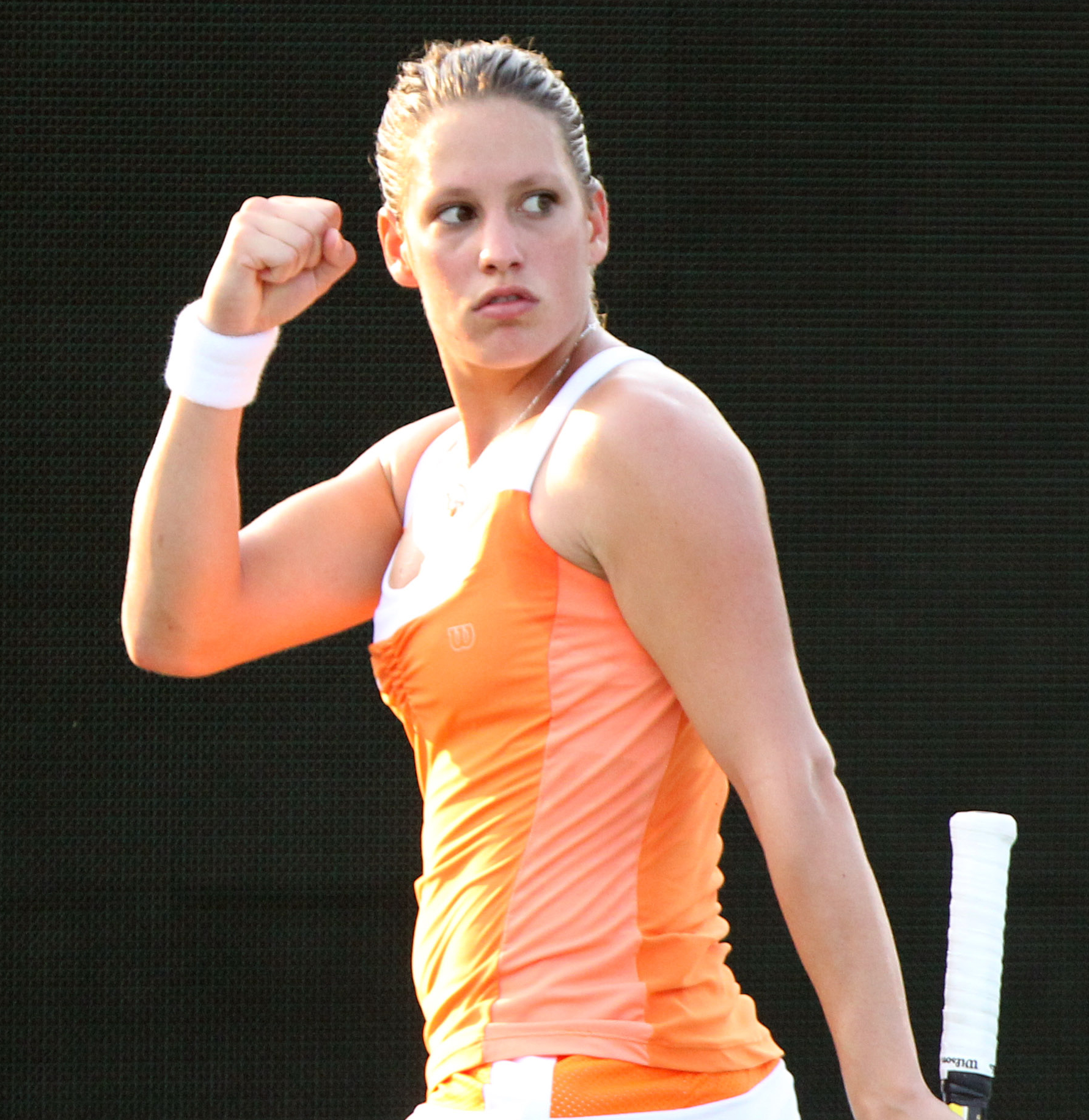
Stéphanie Dubois

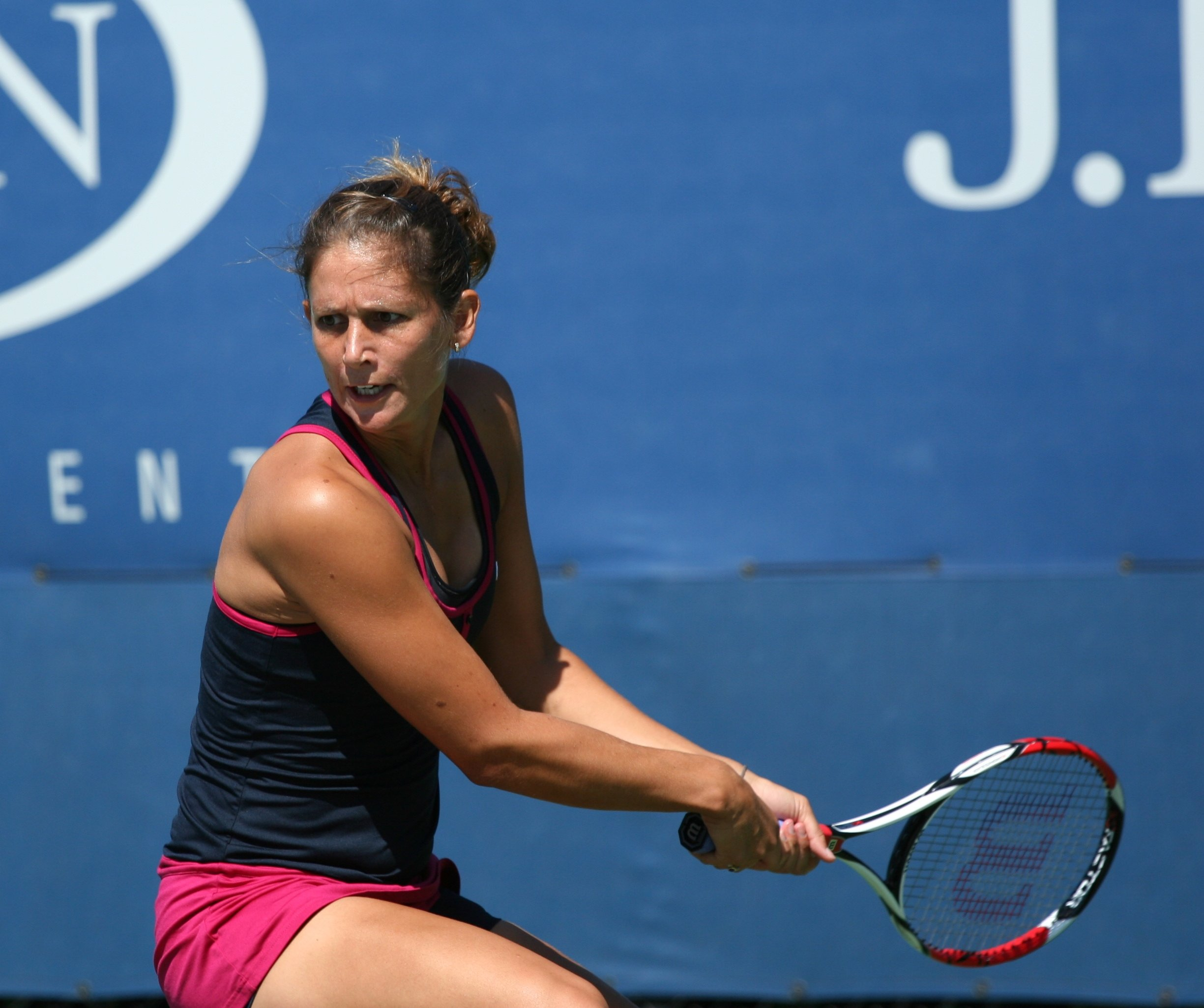
Marie-Ève Pelletier

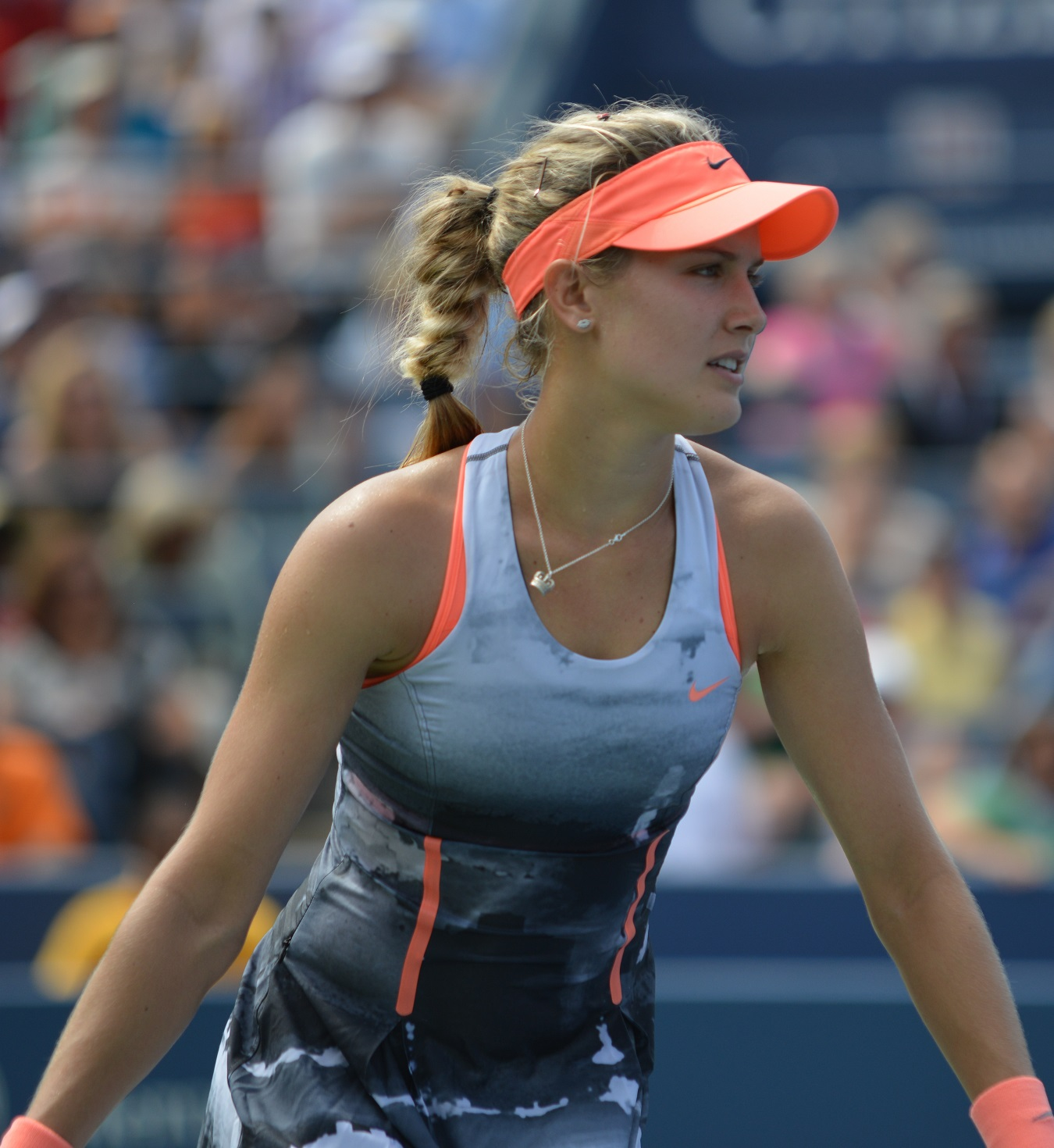
Eugenie Bouchard

Name	Born	First	Last	Ties	Win/Loss		
Name	Born	First	Last	Ties	Sin	Dou	Tot
**Françoise Abanda**	February 5, 1997	2015	2019	6	6–4	0–1	6–5
**Bianca Andreescu**	June 16, 2000	2017	2019	8	7–3	3–0	10–3
Ann Barclay	January 31, 1940	1963	1963	1	0–1	0–1	0–2
Wendy Barlow	May 7, 1960	1978	1980	3	1–2	1–1	1–3
Carling Bassett-Seguso	October 9, 1967	1982	1987	15	10–5	2–4	12–9
Vicki Berner	July 26, 1945	1964	1968	7	1–4	3–3	4–7
Marjorie Blackwood	May 1, 1957	1976	1982	18	10–7	6–4	16–11
Nina Bland	April 21, 1959	1979	1981	5	1–4	0–0	1–4
**Eugenie Bouchard**	February 25, 1994	2011	2018	10	12–4	1–0	13–4
Barbara Brankovska	September 25, 1952	1976	1977	5	1–2	2–0	3–2
Louise Brown	November 19, 1922	1963	1964	3	0–1	1–2	1–3
Susan Butt	March 19, 1938	1967	1970	3	1–1	0–1	1–2
**Gabriela Dabrowski**	April 1, 1992	2013	2019	13	0–3	7–6	7–9
Karen Dewis	September 19, 1962	1980	1984	6	1–2	2–2	3–4
Maureen Drake	March 21, 1971	2000	2003	15	10–3	6–1	16–4
Stéphanie Dubois	October 31, 1986	2004	2013	22	12–8	11–2	23–10
**Leylah Annie Fernandez**	September 6, 2002	2019	2019	1	0–1	0–0	0–1
**Sharon Fichman**	December 3, 1990	2005	2019	28	9–3	15–7	24–10
Marianne Groat	June 5, 1965	1984	1984	2	1–1	0–0	1–1
Jill Hetherington	October 27, 1964	1983	1996	30	3–5	13–15	16–20
Patricia Hy-Boulais	August 22, 1965	1991	1998	19	10–12	4–3	14–15
Sonya Jeyaseelan	April 24, 1976	1997	2003	24	12–5	17–2	29–7
Helen Kelesi	November 15, 1969	1986	1994	17	11–5	4–5	15–10
Renata Kolbovic	July 30, 1976	1999	2001	8	1–0	7–1	8–1
**Rebecca Marino**	December 16, 1990	2011	2019	4	2–4	1–1	3–5
Mélanie Marois	March 10, 1984	2004	2004	4	0–0	3–1	3–1
Andrée Martin	March 18, 1949	1969	1975	16	4–10	4–7	8–17
Martina Nejedly	May 26, 1975	1999	1999	4	1–2	2–0	3–2
Jana Nejedly	June 9, 1974	1995	2003	23	19–5	1–1	20–6
Brenda Nunns	September 13, 1945	1966	1966	1	0–0	0–1	0–1
Jane O'Hara	July 24, 1951	1969	1975	18	8–8	6–6	14–14
Hélène Pelletier	January 2, 1959	1981	1985	12	2–0	6–6	8–6
Marie-Ève Pelletier	May 18, 1982	2002	2012	30	9–9	16–6	25–15
**Charlotte Robillard-Millette**	January 12, 1999	2016	2017	4	0–1	4–0	4–1
**Katherine Sebov**	January 5, 1999	2017	2018	5	3–1	1–1	4–2
Benita Senn	August 23, 1931	1964	1964	2	0–2	0–0	0–2
Lisette Senn	March 12, 1958	1977	1979	7	1–2	2–4	3–6
Ekaterina Shulaeva	May 30, 1987	2008	2008	1	1–0	0–0	1–0
Rene Simpson	January 14, 1966	1988	1998	24	10–7	10–9	20–16
Susan Stone	January 31, 1950	1975	1976	2	1–1	0–1	1–2
Valérie Tétreault	January 21, 1988	2010	2010	1	2–0	0–0	2–0
Janice Tindle	July 3, 1950	1972	1973	6	2–4	1–1	3–5
Faye Urban	October 28, 1945	1966	1970	8	2–6	3–4	5–10
Angela Walker	December 18, 1960	1981	1983	6	1–3	3–0	4–3
Vanessa Webb	January 24, 1976	2000	2003	8	0–0	7–1	7–1
**Aleksandra Wozniak**	September 7, 1987	2004	2016	36	32–11	8–1	40–12
Jane Young	May 31, 1965	1985	1986	3	1–1	0–1	1–2
**Carol Zhao**	June 20, 1995	2016	2018	2	0–1	1–1	1–2

*Active players in bold, statistics as of September 9, 2019
