= Kalven Report =

1967 University of Chicago policy report

The Kalven Report is a policy document issued by the University of Chicago in 1967 that articulates the principle of institutional neutrality in political and social matters. The report was authored by a faculty committee led by Harry Kalven Jr., a professor of law, and has since been regarded as a guiding statement on the role of universities in public discourse and academic freedom.

== Background ==
The report was drafted in response to growing activism on college campuses during the 1960s. At the time, many institutions of higher learning were faced with calls to take official stances on social and political issues. The University of Chicago sought to clarify its position regarding institutional expression while upholding individual academic freedom.

== Core principles ==
The Kalven Report argues that the university should serve as a forum for free inquiry rather than as a collective political entity. It asserts that the institution’s role is to foster an environment where scholars and students can freely debate ideas, rather than endorsing specific political positions. The report emphasizes:

Institutional Neutrality: The university, as an institution, should not take positions on social and political issues unrelated to its core function of education and research.

Academic Freedom: Individual faculty members and students should have full freedom to express their views without fear of institutional censorship or reprisal.

Protection from External Pressures: The report warns against universities becoming instruments of social change in ways that might compromise their commitment to free inquiry.

== Impact and reception ==
The Kalven Report has been widely cited in discussions on academic freedom and university governance. It has served as a benchmark for universities navigating politically charged environments, particularly in cases involving free speech controversies on campus. In the decades following its release, institutions have grappled with balancing the report’s principles against calls for universities to take ethical stands on issues such as civil rights, apartheid, and climate change. The Kalven Report has been invoked in debates over the role of universities in addressing issues such as diversity, equity, and inclusion policies, faculty extramural speech, and responses to global crises. Some institutions have reaffirmed their commitment to its principles, while others have modified their approaches in light of changing societal expectations.

Critics argue that institutional neutrality can sometimes be used to justify inaction in the face of pressing moral concerns. Proponents, however, maintain that the report preserves the integrity of academic institutions by preventing them from becoming politicized entities.

== See also ==
- Woodward Report, Yale University statement (text) affirming institutional commitment to academic freedom and to freedom of speech
