= Ronald Green (basketball) =

American-Israeli basketball player

Ronald "Ronnie" Green רונלד "רוני" גרין
Personal information
- Born: August 5, 1944 Miami Beach, Florida
- Died: July 2012 (aged 67)
- Listed height: 6 ft 6 in (1.98 m)

Career information
- High school: Miami Beach (Miami Beach, Florida)
- College: Vanderbilt (1963–1966)
- NBA draft: 1966: undrafted
- Position: Forward
Medals
Representing United States
Men's basketball
Maccabiah Games
Silver medal – second place	1969	Tel Aviv

Ronald Green (Hebrew: רונלד גרין; August 5, 1944 – July 2012) was an American basketball player. He played the forward position. He played in the Israel Basketball Premier League, and for the Israeli national basketball team.

== Biography ==
Green was born in Miami Beach, Florida, and was Jewish. He was raised by Morris and Florence Green. He was 6 ft 6 in (198 cm) tall. His son Erin Green also played professional basketball in Israel.

He attended Miami Beach High School, where Green played on the basketball team from 1960 to 1962, and was named All-City First Team.

Green attended Vanderbilt University (B.A. in Business Administration, '66; MBA University of Miami, '69), on a full scholarship. He played for the Vanderbilt Commodores from 1963 to 1966. In 1964–65, the team won the Southeastern Conference (SEC) championship.

He played basketball for Team USA in the 1965 Maccabiah Games alongside Tal Brody and Steve Chubin, winning a gold medal, and in the 1969 Maccabiah Games alongside Steve Kaplan, Jack Langer, and Neal Walk, winning a silver medal.

Green played professionally in the Israel Basketball Premier League for Maccabi Tel Aviv in 1970–71, averaging 14.1 points per game. He played on the Israeli national basketball team, winning a silver medal with the team at the 1970 Asian Games. In addition, he played in the Italian Professional League.

After playing basketball abroad, and marrying an Israeli nurse, Green returned to Miami to work with Green Brothers Food Brokerage, as well as an account manager with Buitoni and Häagen-Dazs. Green suffered from a rare disease known as multiple system atrophy. Green married Carol Litman, a high school English teacher, in 1983. She cared for him as MSA took his life.
