= Steve Kaplan (basketball) =

American-Israeli basketball player

Personal information
- Listed height: 6 ft 6 in (1.98 m)

Career information
- High school: Collingswood (Collingswood, New Jersey)
- College: Rutgers (1969–1972)
- NBA draft: 1972: undrafted
- Position: Small forward

Career history
- ?–?: Hapoel Ramat Gan

Career highlights
- As player: 5× Israeli Premier League Top Scorer (1974–1978)
Medals
Men's basketball
Representing United States
Maccabiah Games
Silver medal – second place	1969 Tel Aviv	{{{2}}}

Steven Mark Kaplan (Hebrew: סטיב קפלן) is an American-Israeli former basketball player and coach. Kaplan played 14 seasons in the Israel Basketball Premier League. He played the forward position. He is 8th all-time in career points in the league.

== Early and personal life ==
Kaplan is Jewish, and has dual American-Israeli citizenship. He grew up in Collingswood, New Jersey and played prep basketball at Collingswood High School. He is 6 ft 6 in (198 cm) tall. He served in the Israel Defense Forces, moved to Ramat Gan, Israel, and is married to Israeli-born Irit Kaplan. His son Tom Kaplan played for the Israel 17-under national basketball team, and attended Monmouth University.

== Basketball career ==
Kaplan played basketball for Team USA in the 1969 Maccabiah Games winning a silver medal alongside Ronald Green, Jack Langer, and Neal Walk, and for Team Israel in the 1977 Maccabiah Games.

He attended Rutgers University-New Brunswick ('72). Kaplan was captain of the Rutgers basketball team in his senior year. In his Rutgers career, he averaged 16.4 points and 7.6 rebounds per game, with a 48.2 field goal percentage and an 88.8 free throw percentage (the second-highest in school history). His .927 free throw percentage in 1989–90 is the highest in Rutgers history.

Kaplan played 14 seasons of professional basketball in Israel with Hapoel Ramat Gan, in the Israel Basketball Premier League. He is 8th all-time in career points in the league, with 5,913.

He also played on the Israeli national basketball team, and competed in EuroBasket 1979, in which the Israeli national team won the silver medal, its greatest achievement of all time.

After his basketball career, Kaplan became the director of logistics for a chemical company.

== See also ==
- Israeli Premier League Statistical Leaders
