= Neal Walk =

American basketball player

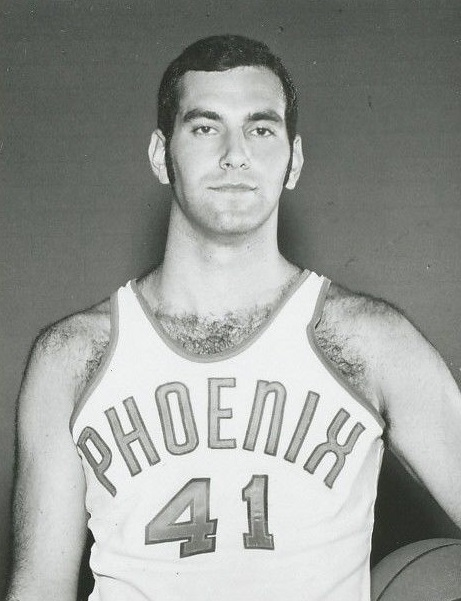
- Walk with the Phoenix Suns in 1969

Personal information
- Born: July 29, 1948 Cleveland, Ohio, U.S.
- Died: October 4, 2015 (aged 67) Phoenix, Arizona, U.S.
- Listed height: 6 ft 10 in (2.08 m)
- Listed weight: 220 lb (100 kg)

Career information
- High school: Miami Beach (Miami Beach, Florida)
- College: Florida (1966–1969)
- NBA draft: 1969: 1st round, 2nd overall pick
- Drafted by: Phoenix Suns
- Playing career: 1969–1981
- Position: Center
- Number: 41

Career history
- 1969–1974: Phoenix Suns
- 1974–1975: New Orleans Jazz
- 1975–1976: New York Knicks
- 1977–1978: Reyer Venezia Mestre
- 1978–1981: Hapoel Ramat Gan

Career highlights
- Second-team All-American – AP (1968); 2× Third-team All-American – NABC, UPI (1969); Third-team All-American – AP (1969); NCAA rebounding leader (1968); 2× First-team All-SEC (1968, 1969); No. 41 retired by Florida Gators

Career NBA statistics
- Points: 7,157 (12.6 ppg)
- Rebounds: 4,392 (7.7 rpg)
- Assists: 1,214 (2.1 apg)
- Stats at NBA.com
- Stats at Basketball Reference
Medals
Representing United States
Men's basketball
Maccabiah Games
Silver medal – second place	1969	Tel Aviv

Neal Eugene Walk (July 29, 1948 – October 4, 2015) was an American college and professional basketball player who was a center in the National Basketball Association (NBA) for eight seasons during the late 1960s and 1970s, playing overseas afterward. Walk played college basketball for the University of Florida, and remains the Florida Gators' all-time rebounds leader. The Phoenix Suns picked Walk second overall in the 1969 NBA draft, having lost the coin toss with the Milwaukee Bucks for Lew Alcindor. Walk played professionally for the Suns, the New Orleans Jazz and the New York Knicks of the NBA.

== Early life ==
Walk was born in Cleveland, Ohio to a Jewish family, and moved to Miami Beach, Florida, with his parents Al and Sylvia at the age of 6. He attended Miami Beach High School, and played high school basketball for the Miami Beach Hi-Tides, starting for the first time in his senior year. His high school team made the state semifinals and due to its makeup of mostly Jewish players, it sometimes was subjected to opposing fans yelling anti-Semitic comments at them.

== College career ==
Walk accepted an athletic scholarship to attend the University of Florida in Gainesville, Florida, where he played for coach Tommy Bartlett's Florida Gators men's basketball team for three seasons from 1966 to 1969. In his junior season, Walk led the NCAA with 19.8 rebounds a game and averaged 26.5 points per game. As a senior team captain, he led the Gators to the 1969 National Invitation Tournament—their first-ever post-season tournament. When Walk graduated from Florida, he was the Gators' all-time leading scorer, and still maintains the team records for career rebounds (1,181), average points per game (20.8), and rebounds in a single game (31), among others. His No. 41 jersey remains the only number to have been retired by the Florida basketball program.

He won a silver medal at the 1969 Maccabiah Games in Israel for Team USA alongside Ronald Green, Steve Kaplan, and Jack Langer.

== Professional career ==
Walk was drafted in the first round (second pick overall) of the 1969 NBA draft by the Phoenix Suns, after they lost a coin toss with the Milwaukee Bucks for the number one pick, which turned out to be Lew Alcindor (later known as Kareem Abdul-Jabbar). In an interview with author Charley Rosen near the end of his life, Walk commented on his perception as one of the league's great "booby prizes", saying "I never paid attention to that bullshit. How many guys would love to be the second overall pick?"

Milwaukee Bucks forward Curtis Perry, a teammate of Abdul-Jabbar's, described Walk's career high 42 point game against the Bucks on January 11, 1972, as "Talent meeting the moment, a harmonic convergence."

He played for the Suns from 1969 to 1974, averaging a career best 20.2 points per game and 12.4 rebounds per game in the 1972–73 season. Walk was traded to the then New Orleans Jazz, and subsequently traded to the New York Knicks, where he played for two seasons. Afterward, he went to play in Venice, Italy, then in Israel with Hapoel Ramat Gan, playing for the team for three seasons.

Walk is the only Suns player besides Charles Barkley to average 20 points and 12 rebounds in a season.

== NBA career statistics ==
Legend
GP	Games played	GS	Games started	MPG	Minutes per game
FG%	Field goal percentage	3P%	3-point field goal percentage	FT%	Free throw percentage
RPG	Rebounds per game	APG	Assists per game	SPG	Steals per game
BPG	Blocks per game	PPG	Points per game	**Bold**	Career high

=== Regular season ===
Year	Team	GP	GS	MPG	FG%	3P%	FT%	RPG	APG	SPG	BPG	PPG
1969–70	Phoenix	**82**	–	17.0	.470	–	.640	5.5	1.0	–	–	8.2
1970–71	Phoenix	**82**	—	24.8	.451	—	.765	8.2	1.4	–	–	12.9
1971–72	Phoenix	81	—	26.4	.479	—	.744	8.2	1.9	–	–	15.7
1972–73	Phoenix	81	—	**38.4**	.466	—	.786	**12.4**	3.5	–	–	**20.2**
1973–74	Phoenix	**82**	—	31.1	.460	—	.791	10.2	**4.0**	**0.9**	**0.7**	16.8
1974–75	New Orleans	37	—	23.0	.422	—	.800	7.1	2.7	0.8	0.5	9.9
1974–75	New York	30	—	9.1	.409	—	**.880**	2.6	0.7	0.2	0.1	3.9
1975–76	New York	**82**	—	16.3	.432	—	.798	4.7	1.5	0.3	0.3	7.4
1976–77	New York	11	—	12.3	**.491**	—	.857	2.5	0.5	0.4	0.3	5.6
Career		568	—	24.4	.459	—	.758	7.7	2.1	0.6	0.4	12.9

=== Playoffs ===
Year	Team	GP	GS	MPG	FG%	3P%	FT%	RPG	APG	SPG	BPG	PPG
1970	Phoenix	**5**	—	12.6	.395	—	**.750**	**7.0**	0.4	–	–	**8.0**
1975	New York	3	—	**13.0**	**.500**	—	—	1.7	**0.7**	**0.3**	**0.7**	3.3
Career		8	—	12.8	.415	—	.750	5.0	0.5	0.3	0.7	6.3

== Life after the NBA ==
After Walk retired, he legally changed his first name to Joshua.

In 1988, while Walk was living in Phoenix, it was discovered that Walk had a benign tumor enveloping his spine. Following surgery Walk was left in a wheelchair, from which he played wheelchair basketball for the L.A.-Phoenix Samaritans in the Southern California league of the National Wheelchair Basketball Association. In 1990 Walk was honored at the White House by U.S. President George H. W. Bush, as the "Wheelchair Athlete of The Year".

He later worked for the Phoenix Suns in the Community Affairs department.

Walk is featured in the Miami Beach Senior High School Hall of Fame, a "Gator Great" in the University of Florida Athletic Hall of Fame, and was inducted into the National Jewish Sports Hall of Fame in 2006.

On October 4, 2015, Walk died of an unspecified blood disease.

== Filmograpy ==
=== Television ===
Year	Title	Role	Notes
1972	The New Dick Van Dyke Show	Himself	episode "Chef Mike"

== See also ==
- Florida Gators
- List of Florida Gators in the NBA
- List of select Jewish basketball players
- List of NCAA Division I men's basketball season rebounding leaders
- List of University of Florida alumni
- List of University of Florida Athletic Hall of Fame members
