= Kingman Brewster Jr. =

American educator and diplomat (1919–1988)

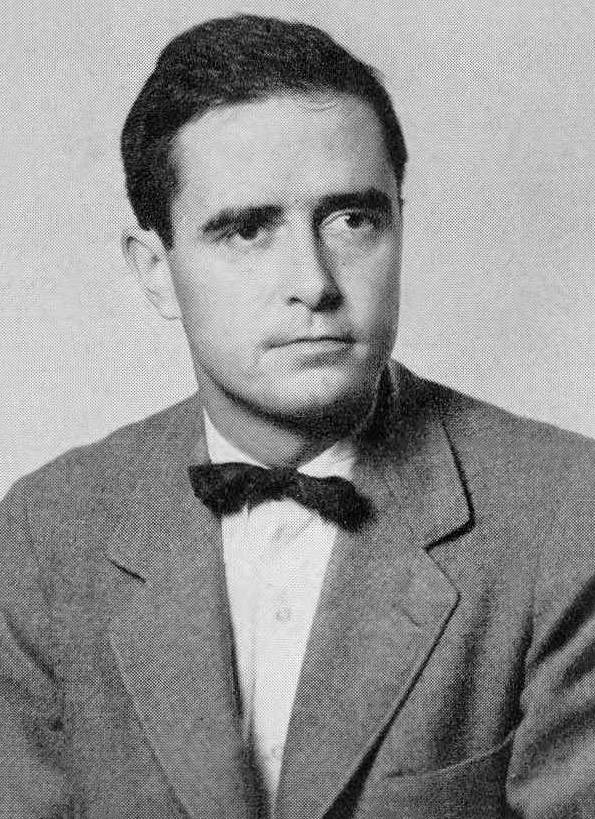
- Brewster, c. 1951

Master of University College, Oxford
- In office 1986–1988
- Preceded by: Arnold Goodman
- Succeeded by: John Albery

United States Ambassador to the United Kingdom
- In office June 3, 1977 – February 23, 1981
- President: Jimmy Carter; Ronald Reagan
- Preceded by: Anne Armstrong
- Succeeded by: John J. Louis Jr.

17th President of Yale University
- In office 1963–1977
- Preceded by: Whitney Griswold
- Succeeded by: Hanna Holborn Gray

8th Provost of Yale University
- In office 1960–1963
- Preceded by: Norman Buck
- Succeeded by: Charles Taylor

Personal details
- Born: June 17, 1919 Longmeadow, Massachusetts, U.S.
- Died: November 8, 1988 (aged 69) Oxford, United Kingdom
- Resting place: Grove Street Cemetery
- Party: Republican
- Spouse: Mary Phillips
- Children: 5
- Relatives: Jordana Brewster (granddaughter); Janet Huntington Brewster (cousin)
- Education: Yale University (BA); Harvard University (LLB)

Kingman Brewster Jr. (June 17, 1919 – November 8, 1988) was an American educator, academic and diplomat. He served as the 17th president of Yale University, United States ambassador to the United Kingdom, and Master of University College, Oxford.

== Early life ==
Coat of arms of William Brewster

Brewster was born in Longmeadow, Massachusetts, the son of Florence Foster (née Besse), a 1907 Phi Beta Kappa graduate of Wellesley College, and Kingman Brewster Sr., a 1906 Phi Beta Kappa graduate of Amherst College and a 1911 graduate of Harvard Law School. He was a direct lineal descendant of Elder William Brewster (c. 1567 – April 10, 1644), the Mayflower passenger, Pilgrim colonist leader, and spiritual elder of the Plymouth Colony, through his son Jonathan Brewster. He was also descended from Mayflower passenger John Howland. He was a grandson of Charles Kingman Brewster and Celina Sophia Baldwin, and Lyman Waterman Besse and Henrietta Louisa Segee. His maternal grandfather, Lyman W. Besse, owned an extensive chain of clothing stores in the Northeast known as "The Besse System."

In 1923, when he was four, his parents separated and later divorced. Brewster and his surviving sister, Mary, were raised by their mother first in Springfield, Massachusetts, and later in Cambridge, Massachusetts. His mother was a firm influence but never overbearing. One of Brewster's friends characterized her as "one of those people whose presence you always felt when she was in the room." Another friend remembered that "she knew poetry, she knew music, she knew art, she knew architecture, and believe me, she knew Kingman."

Brewster wrote that his mother was a "marvelously speculative and philosophical type," a "free-thinking spirit... given to far-out enthusiasms and delighting in sprightly arguments with her more intellectually-conventional friends.

His mother remarried in 1932 to Edward Ballantine, a music professor at Harvard University and composer she had known since childhood. Ballantine had no children of his own and was not interested in a parental role. Brewster's uncle, Arthur Besse, stepped into the role of surrogate father.

== Marriage and family ==
In 1942, while serving in the armed forces, Brewster married Mary Louise Phillips in Jacksonville, Florida. Phillips was born August 30, 1920, in Providence, Rhode Island, the daughter of Mary and Eugene James Phillips (he was a 1905 graduate of Yale College, and a 1907 graduate of Yale Law School). She graduated in 1939 from the Wheeler School and attended but did not graduate from Vassar College. She died on April 14, 2004, at her home in Combe, Berkshire, England, at 83. She was buried next to her husband in the Grove Street Cemetery.

Brewster and his wife had five children. Their granddaughter is actress Jordana Brewster. His first cousin was Janet Huntington Brewster (September 18, 1910 –December 18, 1998), who was an American philanthropist, writer, radio broadcaster, and relief worker during World War II in London. She was married to Edward R. Murrow (April 25, 1908 – April 27, 1965) who was an American broadcast journalist. His uncle, Stanley King, (May 11, 1883 – April 28, 1951) was the eleventh president of Amherst College, from 1932 to 1946.

== Education and war years ==
After graduating from Belmont Hill School in Massachusetts, Brewster entered Yale College, joining the newly established Timothy Dwight residential college and graduating in 1941. Then, he became chairman of the Yale Daily News. During his junior year, he turned down an offer of membership in Skull and Bones, becoming a legend in Yale undergraduate lore.

Like many students at the time, he was an ardent opponent of the US entering World War II and was an outspoken noninterventionist. Brewster idolized fellow antiwar activist Charles Lindbergh, was entranced by Lindbergh's transatlantic flight, and remained (in his words) "bug-eyed about aviation" his entire life. He invited Lindbergh in 1940 to speak at Yale. At the time of the invitation, Lindbergh was the nation's best-known isolationist and the most prominent private citizen opposed to the war. He and Lindbergh strategized on the America First Committee, which Brewster had founded, along with other students at Yale, after the fall of France.

The founding members of the AFC included many of the East Coast universities' best and the brightest, from valedictorians to football all-Americans to campus newspaper editors. Many of the men later achieved national reputations. They included future President Gerald Ford; the first director of the Peace Corps, Sargent Shriver; future Supreme Court justice Potter Stewart; and future US Representative Jonathan Brewster Bingham. The AFC became the most prominent organization in the struggle to keep America out of the European war.

Brewster also took great care to ensure that the noninterventionist movement on campus was not led by social outcasts or malcontents but by "students who had attained relative respect and prominence during their undergraduate years." He emphasized repeatedly that his group represented mainstream campus opinion and that its views were "in agreement with the great majority of Americans of all ages."

Before the end of his senior year, he had officially resigned from the committee after the passage of the Lend-Lease Act. Brewster wrote to Stewart at the time, "I still believe it outrageous to commit this country to the outcome of the war abroad and wish to limit that commitment as much as possible." However, "the question from now on is not one of principle. It is one of military strategy and administrative policy."

Since the passage of Lend-Lease into law, "there is no room for an avowed pressure group huing [sic] a dogmatic line. Whether we like it or not America has decided what its ends are, and the question of means is not longer a legislative matter. A national pressure group therefore is not aiming to determine policy, it is seeking to obstruct it. I cannot be a part of that effort."

With the attack on Pearl Harbor on the morning of December 7, 1941, he immediately volunteered for service in the US Navy. During World War II Brewster was a Navy aviator and flew on submarine-hunting patrols over the Atlantic. He served in the Navy from 1942 to 1946. After the war he entered Harvard Law School, becoming note editor and treasurer of the Harvard Law Review. In 1948, he received his law degree magna cum laude from Harvard Law School.

== Career ==
=== Marshall Plan ===
Brewster's first job after graduating was to accompany Professor Milton Katz to Paris, France, to serve as his assistant at the European headquarters of the Marshall Plan. Professor Katz was a specialist in international law at Harvard Law School and the Deputy Chairman of the Commission for European Recovery, under Averell Harriman, the administrator of the United States Marshall Plan. Though he flourished in the job, Brewster stayed only one year. He returned to the United States in 1949, on Katz's advice, to be a research associate in MIT's Department of Economics and Social Science.

=== Massachusetts Institute of Technology ===
From 1949 and 1950, Brewster was a research associate in the Department of Economics and Social Science at Massachusetts Institute of Technology.

=== Harvard University ===
From 1950 to 1953, he was an assistant professor of law at Harvard University. From 1953 to 1960, Brewster was a full professor at Harvard Law School.

=== Yale ===
In 1960, Brewster accepted the post of provost at Yale, serving from 1960 to 1963. After the death of Yale's president, A. Whitney Griswold, although Brewster was considered Griswold's logical successor, Yale conducted a lengthy, open, and (for Brewster) agonizing search, which lasted five months. On October 11, 1963, the Yale Corporation offered him the presidency by a vote of 13–2; the opposition came from two senior members of the Yale Corporation, who feared that the liberal Republican would push too hard for change in their beloved institution. He served as president of Yale University from 1963 to 1977.

Brewster was known for the changes he made to Yale's faculty, curriculum, and admissions policies. He was president of the University when Yale began admitting women as undergraduates. Academic programs in various disciplines were expanded. He was also president when the faculty voted to terminate academic credit for the Reserve Officers Training Corps program in June 1971 because of the belief that the program made the University complicit in the war in Vietnam. Alumni relations grew testy at times, but fundraising increased throughout his tenure.

Brewster's appointment of liberal theologian Rev. William Sloane Coffin to the post of university chaplain is described in Coffin's autobiography, Once to Every Man. After his appointment, Coffin, a former CIA operative, Williams College chaplain and Skull & Bones alum, became an ardent antiwar activist. In 1967, along with Benjamin Spock, Yale 1925, he organized a mass protest in Boston, Massachusetts, and then sent hundreds of draft cards back to the US Justice Department in Washington, D.C. When Brewster defended Coffin, who was arrested in 1968 with Spock for encouraging draft resistance, he did so citing academic freedom. The action only complicated his dealings with an increasingly-wary alumni association.

Brewster was chairman of the National Policy Panel of the United Nations in 1968. He was a member of the President's Commission on Selective Service in 1966 and 1967 and of the President's Commission on Law Enforcement and Administration of Justice from 1965 to 1967.

==== Wallace affair ====
In 1963, Governor George Wallace was invited by the Yale Political Union to speak at Yale. Brewster asked the Yale Political Union to revoke its invitation for security reasons. The result was a massive outcry across campus. The Woodward Report on free speech, commissioned by Brewster in 1974, was issued in 1975. Historian C. Vann Woodward chaired the committee, which labeled the so-called "Wallace Affair" an outright failure.

==== Jack Langer/NCAA basketball affair ====
In 1969—against the wishes of the NCAA—Yale Jewish center Jack Langer played for Team United States at the 1969 Maccabiah Games in Israel. He did so with the approval of Yale President Kingman Brewster, and the university said it would not stop Langer from "what we feel is a matter of religious freedom." Thereafter, Yale played Langer in basketball games the following season. Brewster's special aide said: "There is no question that Jack Langer will continue to play basketball. We don't care what they do - Jack Langer will play when the coach wants to use him." On January 15, 1970, the NCAA Council placed Yale University on two‐year "full athletic probation" in all sports.

==== Black Panthers ====
On April 23, 1970, during the New Haven Black Panther trials, Brewster spoke to the faculty at Yale. His remarks, which were leaked to the press, made that a day which would follow him for the rest of his life: "I am appalled and ashamed that things should have come to such a pass in this country that I am skeptical of the ability of black revolutionaries to achieve a fair trial anywhere in the United States." This remark, made one week before the tumultuous May Day protests of the Black Panther trials, was decried in editorials and speeches across the country. Vice President Spiro T. Agnew jumped into the fray calling for Brewster's immediate resignation.

McGeorge Bundy, the president of the Ford Foundation, addressed the Yale Club of Boston just days before the May Day demonstrations and assured his fellow alumni that "one of the things I have observed about my friend Brewster is that he will deal with anyone and surrender his responsibilities to nobody."

Brewster inevitably would be judged on May Day's outcome because he had opened his university to all those coming to New Haven to support the Panthers, even offering them food and shelter. Brewster knew that in the face of potential catastrophe, he had the support of other leaders cast from the same mold: friends and colleagues who shared his background and outlook.

On May 1, 1970, at ten minutes before midnight, bombers exploded three devices in the Yale hockey rink. Protesters threw rocks and bottles at the National Guardsmen and taunted the New Haven police. The authorities responded by tear-gassing the demonstrators. Yale chaplain, William Sloane Coffin, stated, "All of us conspired to bring on this tragedy by law enforcement agencies by their illegal acts against the Panthers, and the rest of us by our immoral silence in front of these acts." Fortunately, there were no fatalities that evening.

President Richard Nixon commenting on the events of May 1, 1970, to the Shah of Iran, Mohammad Reza Pahlavi, stated that to be fair to the students, they were not entirely to be blamed for their actions that day: "What can we expect of students if a person in that position and of that stature (Brewster) engages in such acts?" Henry Kissinger, sitting just a few chairs away, mused aloud that Brewster was the one man whose assassination would benefit the United States. Brewster's handling of the May Day demonstrations and his actions after the crisis made him a target of the Nixon White House.

==== Vietnam War ====
He is also well known for his handling of the student protests on the Yale campus during the Vietnam War era, a war that Brewster openly criticized and opposed. He never allowed such convictions to disrupt the University's operations, especially classes.

On May 12, 1972, Brewster made a public statement, printed in full on the front page of the Yale Daily News, prior to a campus visit by Richard Nixon's Secretary of State William P. Rogers. Brewster, on the one hand, threatened to expel students who might bar Rogers from speaking. Still, he also said that he "expects" disciplined picketing and asked that students appropriately protest Rogers's appearance. In the end, Rogers canceled his appearance citing "pressing engagements".

==== Admissions ====
As Yale's president, he appointed R. Inslee Clark Jr. ("Inky") as Director of Undergraduate Admissions. Under his tenure, he established academic credentials in the admissions process and the proportion of undergraduate African-Americans, Jews, and public high school graduates at Yale rose. Despite the alumni outrage over these policy changes, Clark held the position from 1965 to 1970.

No aspect of Brewster's presidency stirred more anger and debate than the overhaul of Yale's single-gender undergraduate admissions policy in the 1960s. He also had made it clear from the beginning of his presidency that he was not going to preside over a finishing school on Long Island Sound. Admissions became the battleground over the university's true purpose.

== Diplomacy ==
While serving as Yale's president, Brewster was nominated by President Jimmy Carter on April 7, 1977, to serve as U.S. Ambassador to the Court of St James's. He was confirmed by the United States Senate on April 29, 1977, and he served from 1977 to 1981. Secretary of State Cyrus Vance, a member of the Yale Corporation, and a close personal friend, recommended him to President Carter for the position. Despite his lack of diplomatic experience, the British press was pleased with the appointment, calling Brewster potentially the best ambassador since David K. E. Bruce. They described Brewster as a "New England patrician" and expressed delight at his gold ring with his family motto in Norman French. "My role," he said at the time, "is trying to advise my Government on British attitudes and concerns in the fullest way possible."

He was called to step in and resolve difficulties between United Nations Ambassador Andrew Young and the British Foreign Office. This was followed by smoothing out American/British difficulties over policy toward Rhodesia (Zimbabwe), which helped lead to the end of minority white rule in that country. Brewster reveled in the "good life" of London and took advantage of the range of social occasions from dinner with Elizabeth II of the United Kingdom to quaffing a pint of ale in a working-class pub, saying, "Becoming aware of the richness and variety here is a lot of fun."

=== Later career ===
After stepping down as ambassador in 1981, Brewster was associated with the New York-based law firm of Winthrop, Stimson, Putnam & Roberts. In 1984, he became its resident partner in London. In 1986, Brewster served as a Special Master in the free agency case of NBA forward Albert King of the New Jersey Nets, ultimately ruling King could be a free agent.

==== Master of University College, Oxford ====
In 1986, Brewster was appointed Master of University College, Oxford, serving from 1986 until his death in Oxford in 1988. During this period, he was also the chairman of the Board of the United World Colleges.

== Death ==
Brewster died on November 8, 1988, at John Radcliffe Hospital in Oxford, England. He was buried in the Grove Street Cemetery in New Haven, Connecticut.

== In popular culture ==
He is thought to be the inspiration for Garry Trudeau's fictional character, President King, in the popular comic strip Doonesbury.

== Honors ==
Brewster was elected a Fellow of the American Academy of Arts and Sciences in 1956. He received several honorary Doctor of Laws degrees. They were awarded by Princeton University in 1964, the University of Pennsylvania in 1965, Boston College in 1968, Michigan State University in 1969, and Yale University in 1977. He was elected to the American Philosophical Society in 1978.

Brewster received honorary degrees from 11 British universities while he was ambassador. He received an honorary doctorate from University of Cambridge in 1978 and became the second American master of University College, Oxford in 1985.

== Works ==
He is the author of Anti-trust and American Business Abroad (1969) and coauthor of Law of International Transactions and Relations (1960).

=== Archives ===
- Kingman Brewster, Jr., president of Yale University, records (RU 11). Manuscripts and Archives, Yale University Library. Collection: Kingman Brewster, Jr., president of Yale University, records | Archives at Yale
- Kingman Brewster personal papers (MS 572). Manuscripts and Archives, Yale University Library. Collection: Kingman Brewster personal papers | Archives at Yale

== Sources ==
- Cutter, W.R. (1910). Genealogical and personal memoirs relating to the families of the state of Massachusetts. New York: Lewis Historical Publishing Company
- Jones, Emma C. Brewster. (1908). The Brewster Genealogy, 1566–1907: a Record of the Descendants of William Brewster of the "Mayflower," ruling elder of the Pilgrim church which founded Plymouth Colony in 1620. New York: Grafton Press. OCLC 1611642
- Kabaservice, Geoffrey. (2004). The Guardians: Kingman Brewster, His Circle, and the Rise of the Liberal Establishment. New York: Henry Holt and Company. ISBN 0-8050-6762-0; 53145580
- Karabel, Jerome. The Chosen: The Hidden History of Admission and Exclusion at Harvard, Yale, and Princeton, Houghton Mifflin Company, New York, 2005.
- Kelley, Brooks Mather. (1999). Yale: A History. New Haven: Yale University Press. ISBN 978-0-300-07843-5; OCLC 810552
- Sperber, A.M. "Murrow: His Life and Times". New York: Freundlich Books, 1986. Reprinted by Fordham University Press, 1998.

Diplomatic posts
Preceded by Anne Armstrong	U.S. Ambassador to the United Kingdom; 1977–1981	Succeeded by John J. Louis Jr.
Academic offices
Preceded by Alfred Whitney Griswold	President of Yale University; 1963–1977	Succeeded by Hanna Holborn Gray, acting
Preceded by Arnold Goodman	Master of University College, Oxford; 1986–1988	Succeeded by John Albery
