= Vicki Berner =

Canadian tennis player (1945–2017)

- Country (sports): Canada
- Born: 26 July 1945
- Died: 21 June 2017 (aged 71)

Singles

Grand Slam singles results
- French Open: 3R (1964)
- Wimbledon: 2R (1973)
- US Open: 3R (1966)

Doubles

Grand Slam doubles results
- French Open: 3R (1967)
- Wimbledon: QF (1967)
- US Open: 3R (1966)

Grand Slam mixed doubles results
- French Open: 2R (1964)
- Wimbledon: 3R (1968)
- US Open: SF (1964)
Medal record
Maccabiah Games
Gold medal – first place	1961 Israel	Women's Singles
Gold medal – first place	1961 Israel	Women's Doubles
Gold medal – first place	1965 Israel	Women's Singles

Vicki Berner (26 July 1945 – 21 June 2017) was a Canadian professional tennis player. During her career, Berner won the doubles event at the Canadian Open five times. Between 1964 and 1973, Berner competed in Grand Slam events. Her highest finishes were the quarterfinals of the 1967 Wimbledon Championships in women's doubles and the semifinals at the 1964 U.S. National Championships in mixed doubles. At the Fed Cup in the 1960s, Berner reached the quarterfinals at the 1964 Federation Cup in singles and the 1967 Federation Cup in doubles. In 1995, Berner was named into the Tennis Canada Hall of Fame.

== Biography ==
A native of Vancouver, British Columbia, Berner, who was Jewish, represented Canada in seven Federation Cup ties from 1964 to 1968 and was later, in 1971, the top ranked Canadian player. She was a five-time women's doubles champion at the Canadian Open, and a bronze medalist in doubles at the 1967 Pan American Games (with Faye Urban).

At the 1961 Maccabiah Games in Israel, she was gold medalist in both singles and doubles. At the 1965 Maccabiah Games, she won a gold medal in women's singles, defeating South African Esmé Emmanuel. She competed for Canada in women's singles at the 1969 Maccabiah Games. At the 1973 Maccabiah Games, she won a silver medal in women's doubles, playing with Pam Gullish against South Africans Ilana Kloss and Helen Weiner in the finals.

While competing on the international circuit, as a professional from the early 1970s, she featured regularly in grand slam main draws. She reached the third round of both the 1964 French Championships and 1966 U.S. National Championships. Her best performance came partnering Frew McMillan in the mixed doubles at the 1964 U.S. National Championships, where they made it to the semi-finals.

In other Grand Slam events, Berner competed at her first Wimbledon events in 1963 and 1964. She appeared at Wimbledon six more times between 1965 and 1973. While at Wimbledon, Berner reached the second round at the 1973 Wimbledon Championships in singles and the quarterfinals at the 1967 Wimbledon Championships in doubles. In mixed doubles, Berner made it to the third round of the 1968 Wimbledon Championships. At the Fed Cup, Berner had four wins and seven losses for her overall record. Her highest finishes were both quarterfinals at the 1964 Fed Cup singles event and the 1967 Fed Cup doubles event.

After she retired, Berner taught at the Phoenix Tennis Center from 1961 to 1971. She later served as the Virginia Slims tour director and then director of women's tennis for the USTA. Through this role she captained the United States's winning 1977, 1978 and 1979 Federation Cup teams. After moving to golf in 1980, Berner was the director of the 1981 McDonald's Championship for the LPGA Tour. In 1995, Berner was inducted into the Tennis Canada Hall of Fame.

== WTA Tour finals ==
=== Doubles (0-1) ===
Result	W/L	Date	Tournament	Surface	Partner	Opponents	Score
Loss	0–1	Apr 1972	Jacksonville, United States	Clay	(United States) Billie Jean King	(Australia) Judy Dalton (Australia) Karen Krantzcke	5–7, 4–6

== See also ==
- List of Canada Fed Cup team representatives
