= Benita Senn =

Canadian tennis player (1929–2022)

- Full name: Benita Muriel Senn
- Country (sports): CAN
- Born: 23 August 1929; Toronto, Ontario, Canada
- Died: 23 October 2022 (age 93); Leaside, Ontario, Canada
- Turned pro: 1955 (Amateur Circuit); 1969
- Retired: 1970

Singles
- Career record: 41–31
- Career titles: 8

Grand Slam singles results
- US Open: 1R (1964)

Benita Muriel Senn (née Hulme; 23 August 1929–23 October 2022) was a Canadian tennis player, Physical Therapist and later tennis coach. She competed at the 1964 U.S. National Championships and won the Canadian International Championships and was ranked Canadian No 1 the same year. She was active from 1955 to 1970 and won 8 career singles titles.

== Career ==
Born Benita Muriel Hulme on 23 August 1931, she married Englishman Stanley Alfred Senn in March 1953 in London, England. In 1955, she became a member of the Toronto Lawn Tennis Club, and in August same year she won her first title at Toronto District Championships against Anne Bagge. She won her final title in May 1970 at the Leaside Invitation against Louise Brown. In June 1970, she played her final singles tournament at the Moore Park Championships where she reached the final, but lost to Faye Urban. She died on 23 October 2022 at Leaside, Ontario, Canada.
