= Woodward Report =

1974 report issued by Yale University

The Woodward Report, formally titled the Report of the Committee on Freedom of Expression at Yale, was issued by Yale University on December 23, 1974. Historian C. Vann Woodward chaired the committee. Yale endorsed the first section of the report as official policy.

The final paragraph of that section reads:

The conclusions we draw, then, are these: even when some members of the university community fail to meet their social and ethical responsibilities, the paramount obligation of the university is to protect their right to free expression. This obligation can and should be enforced by appropriate formal sanctions. If the university's overriding commitment to free expression is to be sustained, secondary social and ethical responsibilities must be left to the informal processes of suasion, example, and argument.
