= Jack Langer =

Basketball player

Personal information
- Born: 1949 (age 76–77)
- Listed height: 6 ft 8 in (2.03 m)
- Listed weight: 220 lb (100 kg)

Career information
- High school: Fort Lee (Fort Lee, New Jersey)
- College: Yale (1968–70)
- Position: Center
Medals
Representing United States
Men's basketball
Maccabiah Games
Silver medal – second place	1969	Tel Aviv

Jack Langer is an American former basketball player. During his basketball career, he played college basketball at Yale University, and won a silver medal with Team USA in the 1969 Maccabiah Games in Israel.

The National Collegiate Athletic Association (NCAA) had not authorized American college basketball players to compete in the 1969 Maccabiah Games. When Langer returned to the Yale team during the 1970 season, the NCAA punished Yale by barring its teams and athletes from competing in NCAA postseason competitions and from receiving money for televised events for two years.

Langer later attended Harvard Business School, and had a career as an investment banker.

== Early and personal life ==
Langer was born to Kate and Moritz Langer and raised in Fort Lee, New Jersey, and is Jewish. He attended Fort Lee High School, graduating in 1967. In 1976 he married Lisa Beth Rutstein. The couple later lived in Palm Beach Gardens, Florida, and Old Tappan, New Jersey.

== Basketball career ==
=== Yale ===
Langer was a center for the Yale Bulldogs at Yale University, where he was an economics major in the class of 1971. At the time he was 6 feet 8 inches (2.03 m) tall, and weighed 220 pounds (100 kg).

In his sophomore year in 1968–69, he averaged 3.1 points and 2.8 rebounds per game. As a junior in 1969–70, he averaged 5.0 points and 4.8 rebounds per game. He was described in The Michigan Daily as "a second string center on Yale University's basketball team who is not an exceptional player, but who loves to play the game."

=== 1969 Maccabiah Games ===
==== NCAA bars participation of American college basketball players ====
In 1969, the National Collegiate Athletic Association (NCAA) barred participation by American college basketball players in the Maccabiah Games, the first time it had instituted such a ban. However, the NCAA allowed participation by American college athletes in other Maccabiah Games sports, such as swimming, track, fencing, and soccer.

Basketball was different, however. The Amateur Athletic Union (AAU) – with which the NCAA was locked in a bitter power struggle – was for the first time organizing the Team USA basketball team for the Maccabiah Games, a role that had formerly been held by the NCAA. NCAA executive director Walter Byers was involved in the rule change. Byers wrote a letter to University of Pennsylvania President Gaylord Harnwell, in which he said that in refusing to approve participation by NCAA players in the Maccabiah Games basketball tournament, the NCAA "hoped to persuade" the AAU to abandon its effort to control amateur basketball. The Harvard Crimson described him as "power-mad," and others described him as a "petty tyrant."

The Eastern College Athletic Conference (ECAC), an affiliate of the NCAA, followed the NCAA's direction on sanctions. The New York Times reported that the NCAA's decision to bar participation in Maccabiah basketball stemmed from the NCAA's feud with the AAU over amateur athletes.

==== Langer competes for Team USA at the Games ====
Yale University, with the approval of the school's President Kingman Brewster, informed Langer that they would support his participation with Team USA in the 1969 Maccabiah Games. Other American college basketball players, such as Andy Hill and Eric Minkin, withdrew their applications to play in the Maccabiah Games out of concern that the NCAA would suspend them if they played.

Langer played for Team USA in the 1969 Maccabiah Games in Tel Aviv, Israel, in July and August 1969 after his sophomore year at Yale. The team won a silver medal at the games.

Describing his experience, Langer said: "The word patriotism takes on a new meaning and transcends the Pledge of Allegiance in grammar school when one, representing the United States, marches into a stadium filled with 50,000 people amid the strains of 'The Star-Spangled Banner'." He recalled later: "That trip to the Maccabiah Games was the greatest experience of my life, and there was religious as well as basketball meaning for me ... on my return to school, all the varsity team captains got together and backed me 100%."

=== NCAA and ECAC sanctions ===
On September 22, 1969, the ECAC declared Langer ineligible to play basketball in intercollegiate competition, because he had played in the Maccabiah.

Yale, however, said it would still play Langer despite the ruling, both for the rest of the 1969–70 season, and for the following season when he would be a senior. Yale said it was openly violating a rule it considered "in violation of religious freedom," given that the Maccabiah Games had a religious as well as a sports aspect. Yale maintained that Langer had the right to play in the Maccabiah Games, and said that Yale would not stop him from "what we feel is a matter of religious freedom". Yale Athletic Director Delaney Kiphuth said the school was "perfectly willing to take whatever punishment is handed out; we stand by Langer." The Special Assistant to the President of Yale, Sam Chauncey, said: "There is no question that Jack Langer will continue to play basketball. We don't care what they do – Jack Langer will play when the coach wants to use him."

The eight-member Ivy League, to which Yale belongs, and all Ivy presidents endorsed Yale's stand. The eight Ivy League presidents wrote a letter signed by Dale R. Corson, Cornell University's president and the chairman of the Ivy League president's committee, to NCAA executive director Walter Byers, as well as the ECAC. commissioner Asa Bushnell and president Jim Decker, supporting Yale's decision to play Langer. The letter said that the Ivy presidents believed that the prohibition on Maccabiah Games basketball was the result of the war between the NCAA and AAU over control of amateur athletics.

Starting on December 3, 1969, Yale played Langer in the team's first two games. On December 10, 1969, in reaction, the ECAC executive council censured Yale, a charter member, in what was a rare move, and issued a "cease and desist" order. That night, the Yale team again played Langer in a game. On January 13, 1970, in a secret meeting the ECAC Council put Yale on probation for 17 months. Hours later, however, after a second secret meeting the ECAC withdrew its penalty "for further study."

=== Yale placed on probation for playing Langer ===
On January 15, 1970, the NCAA placed Yale University on a two‐year "full athletic probation" in all sports, during which all Yale teams and athletes were barred from participating in NCAA tournaments, championships and other postseason competitions, and from receiving any money for televised events for 2 years. The decision impacted 300 Yale students, every Yale student on its sports teams, over the next two years. The probation, characterized as "drastic" by the NCAA's Art Bergstrom, was taken because Yale had continued to use Langer, even though he had been declared ineligible in September by the Eastern College Athletic Conference because Langer competed in the 1969 Maccabiah Games basketball tournament in Tel Aviv. On February 24, 1970, the ECAC likewise placed Yale on probation for 17 months, which had the effect of Yale not being able to take part in ECAC-sponsored events. Yale became the first school in the Ivy League and the ECAC to receive such a punishment in the NCAA's history.

==== Reaction ====
The presidents of the other seven Ivy League schools issued a statement condemning the NCAA's actions in the "Langer Case". The Harvard Crimson called the probation "not only unjust, but intolerable" and urged the Ivy League to withdraw from the NCAA. Harvard track and field captain Ed Nosal and two other Harvard athletes, sympathetic to Langer and Yale and disdainful of the NCAA rule, protested at the 1970 NCAA Indoor Track and Field Championships by standing on the awards stand wearing blue Yale jerseys. In February 1970 Representative Robert N. Giaimo (D-Connecticut) said in the U.S. Congress:

The Yale case, involving basketball player Jack Langer, is tragic. It shows that the NCAA is willing to use any weapon in its continuing power struggle with the Amateur Athletic Union. It shows that the NCAA does not care if it hurts member institutions or individual athletes in the process. It shows once again that the NCAA is ... under the control of a stubborn, dictatorial hierarchy that does not hesitate to use athletes and schools alike as mere pawns in a game of power politics.

In October 1970, Langer quit the Yale basketball team. He explained: "After agonizing about it since last spring, I decided that with my present lack of motivation for playing the game I couldn't sacrifice the team's well‐being by playing."

==== Aftermath ====
In April 1973, the Langer experience was repeatedly brought up during a hearing of the Committee on Education and Labor of the U.S. House of Representatives, regarding bills to amend the Higher Education Act of 1965 "to protect the freedom of student athletes and their coaches to participate as representatives of the United States in amateur international athletic events, and for other purposes." Langer addressed the subcommittee, detailing his experiences.

Howard Cosell, television sports commentator for ABC, described it;

this was a situation where young Americans who happened to be of Jewish persuasion wanted to represent themselves, their universities, their country in what is one of the most traditional and respected international competitions in the world, the Maccabiah Games .. the AAU certified for basketball. So a kid named Jack Langer at Yale ... couldn't go. That is when I became disturbed to the degree I am now. Yale University had the guts to say: "Jack, you go" ... I am reminded of what Al McGuire said quite bluntly to me: 'With all that is going okay and with all that we can do, can you imagine putting Yale University on probation because Jack Langer went to participate in the Maccabiah Games?' ... I don't even know Jack Langer personally, but I fought his battle because it was right.

Congressman Bob Michel (R-Illinois) said he was "incensed" by the Jack Langer matter. Congressman James G. O'Hara (D-Michigan) said he believed that: "the Jack Langers of the world have a right to participate and express themselves [by representing the United States in the Maccabiah Games]."

== Later career ==
After he graduated from Yale in 1971, Langer was later a graduate student at Harvard Business School. In 1989, he was a managing director in corporate finance at Drexel Burnham Lambert. From 1990 to 1994, Langer served as Managing Director and Head of Media Group at Kidder Peabody, and from 1995 to 1997, he was a Managing Director and Head of Media Group at Bankers Trust. From 1997 to 2002, he served as Managing Director and Global Co-Head of the Media Group at Lehman Brothers.
