= 1969 Maccabiah Games =

Multi-sport event in Israel

8th Maccabiah
- Host city: Tel Aviv, Israel
- Nations: 27
- Debuting countries: Republic of the Congo
- Athletes: 1,450
- Opening: July 29, 1969
- Closing: August 7, 1969
- Torchbearer: Amnon Avidan
- Main venue: Ramat Gan Stadium

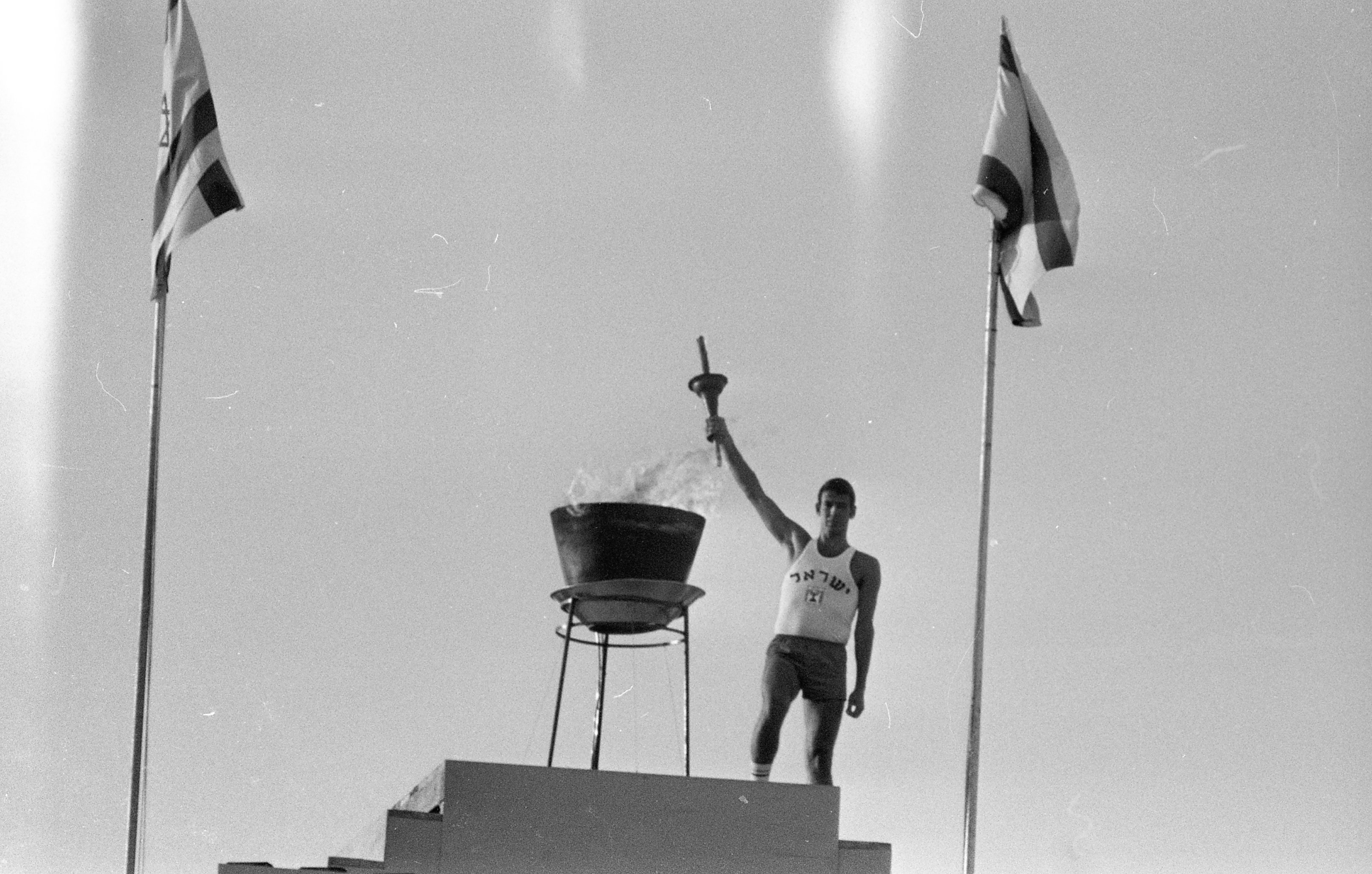
Ceremonial torchbearer Amnon Avidan lighting the Maccabiah flame

At the 8th Maccabiah Games from July 29 to August 7, 1969, 1,450 athletes from 27 countries competed in 22 sports in Israel. The final gold medal count was the United States in first place (64), Israel second (48; though it won the greatest number of total medals), and Great Britain third (11).

Germany and Greece sent teams for the first time since the 1935 Games. A new swimming pool was dedicated at Yad Eliyahu.

== History ==
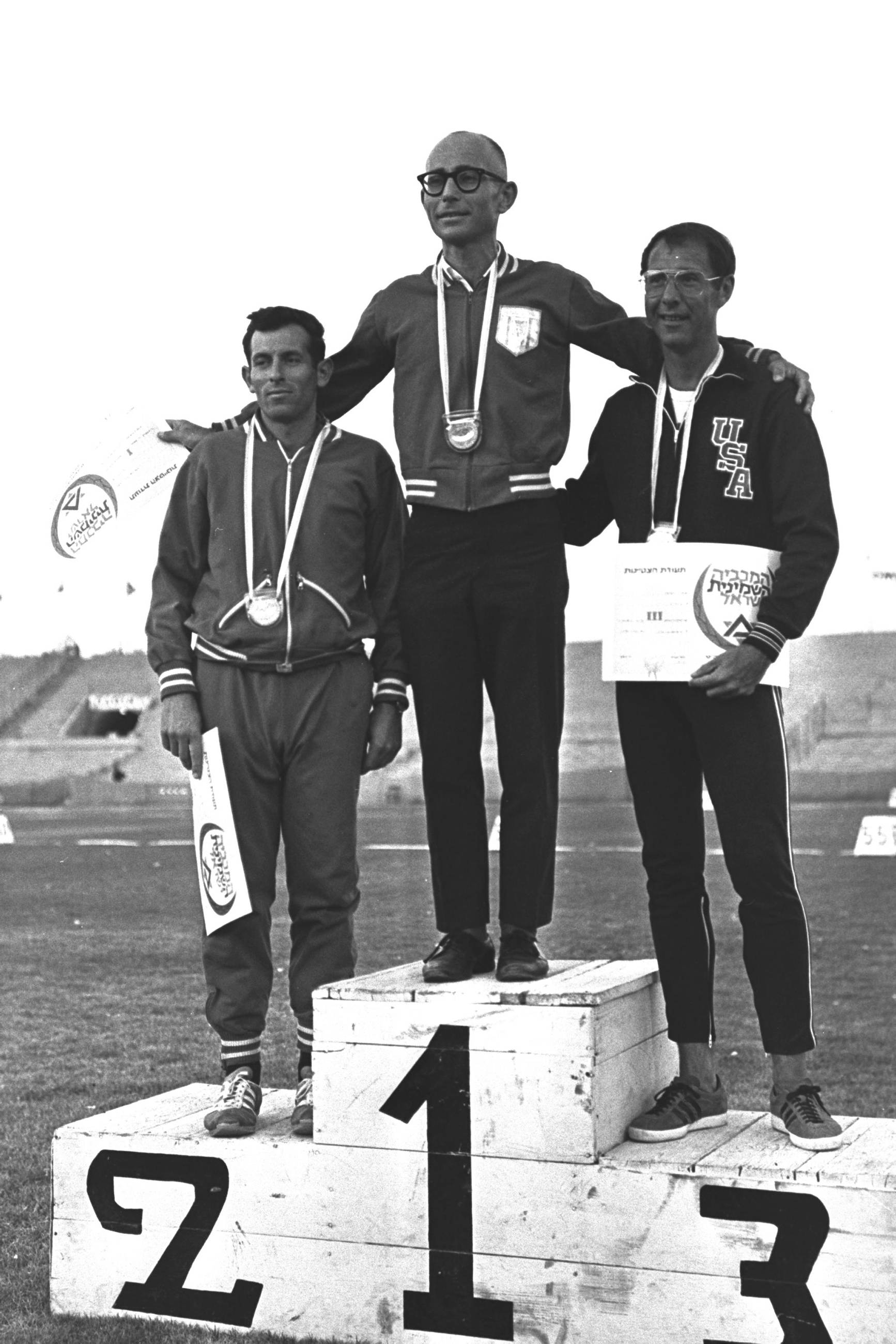
Shaul Ladany (center), winner of 10-km walk, on podium during 8th Maccabiah Games at Ramat Gan Stadium (1969)

The Maccabiah Games are named in honor of the Jewish Maccabees, who in the 2nd century BC revolted against and defeated the superior armies of King Antiochus IV Epiphanes, who was trying to abolish Judaism.

The Maccabiah Games were first held in 1932. In 1961, they were declared a "Regional Sports Event" by, and under the auspices and supervision of, the International Olympic Committee.

== Notable competitors ==
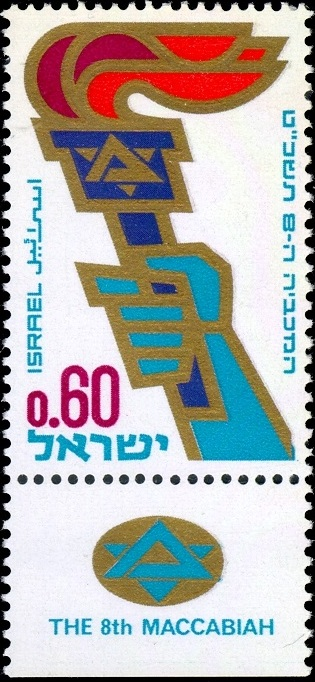
Israeli postal stamp

American swimmer Mark Spitz, 19 years old and holder of three world records, won 6 gold medals, including the 100 m freestyle, 200 m freestyle, 100 m butterfly, and the 200 m relay, in his second Maccabiah Games. He was named outstanding athlete of the Games. Mexican swimmer Roberto Strauss won a gold medal in freestyle. Mexican Olympian Tamara Oynick won the 200 m breastroke.

Tal Brody, having moved from the U.S. to Israel, captained the Israeli basketball team which also had Gabi Teichner playing for it, to a gold medal over the United States, which had on its team Ronald Green, Steve Kaplan, Jack Langer, and Neal Walk.

In track and field, Israeli Olympian Shaul Ladany won gold medals in the 3-km walk (13.35.4), the 10-km walk, and the 50-km walk. Esther Roth of Israel, a future Olympian, won the long jump with a 19-foot, 3/4 inch (5.81 meter) jump. Canadian Olympian Abby Hoffman won the women's 800 m run.

David Berger, an American, won a gold medal in the middleweight weight-lifting contest. He later represented Israel in the 1972 Summer Olympics, but was one of the 11 Israeli sportsmen killed by Arab terrorists in the Munich Massacre.

In fencing, weeks after winning the US national foil championship, American Carl Borack won the Maccabiah sabre championship. Canada's Olympian Peter Bakonyi won a silver medal. Olympian Ralph Cooperman was a medalist for Great Britain in fencing. American Albert Axelrod also competed in fencing at the Games. In judo, Canadian future Olympian Terry Farnsworth won a gold medal in the light-heavyweight class, and Israeli future Olympian Yona Melnik won a gold medal. Bernard Lepkofker competed for the United States in judo.

In tennis, Julie Heldman, who was ranked # 2 in the US, won gold medals in the women's singles, the women's doubles with Marilyn Aschner (defeating South African silver medalists Esmé Emmanuel and P. Kriger), and the mixed doubles with Ed Rubinoff (defeating South African silver medalists Jack Saul, a Davis Cup player, and Esmé Emmanuel). Aschner also competed in singles, where she was defeated in the quarterfinals by South African Esmé Emmanuel. American Davis Cup player Allen Fox defeated South African Julian Krinsky in the men's individual semi-finals and South African Jack Saul in the finals to win a gold medal, and in doubles playing with partner Ronald Goldman they won the gold medal after they defeated Americans Tom Karp and Peter Fishbach in the semifinals, and then Americans Ed Rubinoff and Leonard Schloss in the finals.

In table tennis, Jeff Ingber of England won a silver medal in men's singles. Irene Ogus won a silver medal in table tennis singles, playing for the United States, and a gold medal in doubles with Leah Neuberger. Leah Neuberger won a gold medal in doubles, partnering Irene Ogus for the United States. Jeff Ingber and Irene Ogus won a gold medal in the mixed doubles. Paulina Peisachov competed in women's singles for Israel, and Vicki Berner competed in women's singles for Canada.

In soccer, Benny Rubinstein played for Israel, which won the gold medal. Raul Geller played for Peru, which came in 8th, and Dov Markus competed for the United States, which came in 14th. 19-year-old U.S. amateur golf champion Bruce Fleisher, the US amateur golf champion, won gold medals in both individual and team golf.

== Controversy ==
In 1970 the NCAA banned Yale University from participating in all NCAA sports for two years, in reaction to Yale—against the wishes of the NCAA—playing its Jewish center Jack Langer in college games after Langer had played for Team United States at the 1969 Maccabiah Games with the approval of Yale president Kingman Brewster.

== Participating communities ==
The number in parentheses indicates the number of participants that community contributed.

- Argentina
- Australia
- Austria
- Belgium
- Brazil
- Canada (44)
- Chile
- Denmark
- Finland
- France
- West Germany
- Greece
- Guatemala
- India
- Iran
- Ireland
- Israel
- Italy
- Mexico
- Netherlands
- Peru
- Congo-Brazzaville
- Rhodesia
- South Africa
- Sweden
- Switzerland
- Turkey
- United Kingdom
- United States
- Uruguay
- Venezuela

== Medal count ==
The final gold medal count was United States 63.5; Israel 48 (though it won the greatest number of total medals); Britain 10.5; South Africa 8; the Netherlands 6; Austria, France, and Mexico 4; Argentina, Italy, Canada, and Austria 3; and Rhodesia 2. Of nations that did not win gold medals, those with the most silver medals were: Brazil 3; and Belgium and Finland 1. Sweden won 1.5 bronze medals, and Denmark and Switzerland won one bronze medal each.
