= Louise Brown (tennis) =

Canadian tennis player

- Country (sports): Canada
- Born: November 19, 1922
- Died: November 24, 2003 (aged 81)
- Plays: Left-handed

Singles

Grand Slam singles results
- French Open: 3R (1966)
- Wimbledon: 1R (1963)
- US Open: 3R (1964)

Louise Brown (nee Cook; November 19, 1922 — November 24, 2003) was a Canadian tennis player.

A left-handed player from Dunnville, Ontario, Brown won the 1957 Canadian Open and in a long career ranked in the top 10 nationally for 26 successive years. She made the singles third round at both the 1966 French championships and the 1964 U.S. national championships when she was in her forties. On three occasions she fell to the top seeded Margaret Smith (Court) in a grand slam singles main draw, including at the 1963 Wimbledon Championships. She was playing captain of Canada's inaugural Federation Cup team in 1963 and was a 1991 inductee in the Canadian Tennis Hall of Fame.

== See also ==
- List of Canada Fed Cup team representatives
