= List of Open Era Grand Slam champions by country =

This is a list Grand Slam tennis champions during the Open Era, organized by country. First career wins and highest total counts are boldfaced, and first wins per category are listed in parentheses. The gold-highlighted years with symbol ☆ denote Career Grand Slam achievement years. When the whole box is highlighted yellow, it denotes a "Career Boxed Set". The † sign indicates additional Grand Slam titles achieved before the Open Era.

== Grand Slam titles by country ==
=== Argentina ===
No.	Player	M/W	Total	Australian Open			French Open			Wimbledon			US Open		
No.	Player	M/W	Total	Singles	Doubles	Mixed	Singles	Doubles	Mixed	Singles	Doubles	Mixed	Singles	Doubles	Mixed
1	Guillermo Vilas	M	4	2 (1978^{Dec})	—	—	1 (**1977**)	—	—	—	—	—	1 (1977)	—	—
2	Gabriela Sabatini	W	2	—	—	—	—	—	—	—	1 (**1988**)	—	1 (1990)	—	—
3	Javier Frana	M	1	—	—	—	—	—	1 (**1996**)	—	—	—	—	—	—
4	Patricia Tarabini	W	1	—	—	—	—	—	1 (**1996**)	—	—	—	—	—	—
5	Paola Suárez	W	**8**	—	1 (2004)	—	—	4 (**2001**)	—	—	—	—	—	3 (2002)	—
6	Gastón Gaudio	M	1	—	—	—	1 (**2004**)	—	—	—	—	—	—	—	—
7	Juan Martín del Potro	M	1	—	—	—	—	—	—	—	—	—	1 (**2009**)	—	—
8	Gisela Dulko	W	1	—	1 (**2011**)	—	—	—	—	—	—	—	—	—	—
9	Horacio Zeballos	M	3	—	—	—	—	2 (**2025**)	—	—	—	—	—	1 (2025)	—

=== Australia ===
No.	Player	M/W	Total	Australian Open			French Open			Wimbledon			US Open		
No.	Player	M/W	Total	Singles	Doubles	Mixed	Singles	Doubles	Mixed	Singles	Doubles	Mixed	Singles	Doubles	Mixed
1	Ken Rosewall	M	7 (+11)†	2 (1971)	1 (1972)	—	1 (1968)	1 (**1968**)	—	—	—	—	1 (1970)	1 (1969) ☆	—
2	Fred Stolle	M	4 (+15)†	—	—	1 (1969) (Note: Final match not played, title shared. For more info, see 1969 Australian Open (Mixed doubles))	—	1 (**1968**) ☆	—	—	—	1 (1969)	—	1 (1969)	—
3	Margaret Court	W	**28** (+36)†	4 (1969)	4 (1969)	1 (1969)	3 (1969)	1 (1973)	1 (1969) ☆	1 (1970) ☆	1 (1969) ☆	2 (**1968**)	3 (1969)	4 (1968)	3 (1969)
4	John Newcombe	M	16 (+10)†	2 (1973)	3 (1971)	—	—	2 (1969)	—	2 (1970)	4 (**1968**)	—	1 (1973)	2 (1971) ☆	—
5	Tony Roche	M	9 (+7)†	—	3 (1971)	—	—	1 (1969)	—	—	4 (**1968**)	1 (1976)	—	—	—
6	Rod Laver	M	7 (+13)†	1 (1969)	1 (1969)	—	1 (1969)	—	—	2 (**1968**)	1 (1970)	—	1 (1969) ☆	—	—
7	Ken Fletcher	M	1 (+11)†	—	—	—	—	—	—	—	—	1 (**1968**)	—	—	—
8	Judy Tegart-Dalton	W	5 (+4)†	—	2 (**1969**)	—	—	—	—	—	1 (1969)	—	—	2 (1970) ☆	—
9	Roy Emerson	M	2 (+26)†	—	1 (**1969**)	—	—	—	—	—	1 (1971) ☆	—	—	—	—
10	Evonne Goolagong Cawley	W	14	4 (1974)	5 (**1971**)	—	1 (1971)	—	1 (1972)	2 (1971)	1 (1974)	—	—	—	—
11	Owen Davidson	M	7 (+6)†	—	1 (1972)	—	—	—	—	—	—	3 (**1971**)	—	1 (1973)	2 (1971)
12	Helen Gourlay	W	5	—	4 (**1972**)	—	—	—	—	—	1 (1977)	—	—	—	—
13	Kerry Harris	W	1	—	1 (**1972**)	—	—	—	—	—	—	—	—	—	—
14	Kim Warwick	M	6	—	3 (1978^{Dec})	—	—	1 (1985)	2 (**1972**)	—	—	—	—	—	—
15	Mal Anderson	M	1 (+3)†	—	1 (**1973**)	—	—	—	—	—	—	—	—	—	—
16	Geoff Masters	M	3	—	1 (**1974**)	—	—	—	—	—	1 (1977)	—	—	—	1 (1974)
17	Ross Case	M	2	—	1 (**1974**)	—	—	—	—	—	1 (1977)	—	—	—	—
18	Dick Crealy	M	1 (+2)†	—	—	—	—	1 (**1974**)	—	—	—	—	—	—	—
19	John Alexander	M	2	—	2 (**1975**)	—	—	—	—	—	—	—	—	—	—
20	Philip Dent	M	2	—	1 (**1975**)	—	—	—	—	—	—	—	—	—	1 (1976)
21	Mark Edmondson	M	6	1 (**1976**)	4 (1980^{Dec})	—	—	1 (1985)	—	—	—	—	—	—	—
22	Kerry Melville	W	3 (+1)†	1 (**1977^{Jan}**)	1 (1977^{Dec}) (Note: Title shared due to rain–out. For more info, see 1977 Australian Open (Dec))	—	—	—	—	—	1 (1978)	—	—	—	—
23	Dianne Fromholtz	W	1	—	1 (**1977^{Jan}**)	—	—	—	—	—	—	—	—	—	—
24	Ray Ruffels	M	1	—	1 (**1977^{Dec}**)	—	—	—	—	—	—	—	—	—	—
25	Allan Stone	M	1 (+1)†	—	1 (**1977^{Dec}**)	—	—	—	—	—	—	—	—	—	—
26	Wendy Turnbull	W	9	—	—	—	—	1 (1979)	2 (1979)	—	1 (**1978**)	2 (1983)	—	2 (1979)	1 (1980)
27	Chris O'Neil	W	1	1 (**1978^{Dec}**)	—	—	—	—	—	—	—	—	—	—	—
28	Paul McNamee	M	5	—	2 (**1979^{Dec}**)	—	—	—	—	—	2 (1980)	1 (1985)	—	—	—
29	Peter McNamara	M	3	—	1 (**1979^{Dec}**)	—	—	—	—	—	2 (1980)	—	—	—	—
30	Dianne Evers	W	1	—	1 (**1979^{Dec}**)	—	—	—	—	—	—	—	—	—	—
31	John Fitzgerald	M	9	—	1 (**1982^{Dec}**)	—	—	2 (1986)	—	—	2 (1989) ☆	1 (1991)	—	2 (1984)	1 (1983)
32	Elizabeth Smylie	W	4	—	—	—	—	—	—	—	1 (1985)	1 (1991)	—	—	2 (**1983**)
33	Pat Cash	M	1	—	—	—	—	—	—	1 (**1987**)	—	—	—	—	—
34	Mark Woodforde	M	17	—	2 (1992)	2 (1992)	—	1 (2000) ☆	1 (1995) ☆	—	6 (1993)	1 (1993)	—	3 (**1989**)	1 (1992)
35	Hana Mandlíková (Note: Also see Czechoslovakia)	W	1 (5)	—	—	—	—	—	—	—	—	—	—	1 (**1989**)	—
36	Todd Woodbridge	M	22	—	3 (1992)	1 (1993)	—	1 (2000) ☆	1 (1992)	—	9 (1993)	1 (1994) ☆	—	3 (1995)	3 (**1990**)
37	Nicole Bradtke	W	2	—	—	1 (**1992**)	—	—	—	—	—	—	—	—	1 (1992)
38	Laurie Warder	M	1	—	1 (**1993**)	—	—	—	—	—	—	—	—	—	—
39	Patrick Rafter	M	3	—	1 (1999)	—	—	—	—	—	—	—	2 (**1997**)	—	—
40	Sandon Stolle	M	1	—	—	—	—	—	—	—	—	—	—	1 (**1998**)	—
41	Rennae Stubbs	W	6	—	1 (**2000**)	1 (2000)	—	—	—	—	2 (2001)	—	—	1 (2001)	1 (2001)
42	Lleyton Hewitt	M	3	—	—	—	—	—	—	1 (2002)	—	—	1 (2001)	1 (**2000**)	—
43	Samantha Stosur	W	8	—	1 (2019)	1 (**2005**)	—	1 (2006)	—	—	—	2 (2008)	1 (2011)	2 (2005)	—
44	Alicia Molik	W	2	—	1 (**2005**)	—	—	1 (2007)	—	—	—	—	—	—	—
45	Scott Draper	M	1	—	—	1 (**2005**)	—	—	—	—	—	—	—	—	—
46	Stephen Huss	M	1	—	—	—	—	—	—	—	1 (**2005**)	—	—	—	—
47	Casey Dellacqua	W	1	—	—	—	—	—	1 (**2011**)	—	—	—	—	—	—
48	Matthew Ebden	M	3	—	1 (2024)	1 (**2013**)	—	—	—	—	1 (2022)	—	—	—	—
49	Jarmila Gajdošová	W	1	—	—	1 (**2013**)	—	—	—	—	—	—	—	—	—
50	John Peers	M	3	—	1 (**2017**)	1 (2025)	—	—	—	—	—	—	—	—	1 (2022)
51	Ashleigh Barty	W	4	1 (2022)	—	—	1 (2019)	—	—	1 (2021)	—	—	—	1 (**2018**)	—
52	Thanasi Kokkinakis	M	1	—	1 (**2022**)	—	—	—	—	—	—	—	—	—	—
53	Nick Kyrgios	M	1	—	1 (**2022**)	—	—	—	—	—	—	—	—	—	—
54	Max Purcell	M	2	—	—	—	—	—	—	—	1 (**2022**)	—	—	1 (2024)	—
55	Storm Sanders	W	1	—	—	—	—	—	—	—	—	—	—	—	1 (**2022**)
56	Rinky Hijikata	M	1	—	1 (**2023**)	—	—	—	—	—	—	—	—	—	—
57	Jason Kubler	M	1	—	1 (**2023**)	—	—	—	—	—	—	—	—	—	—
58	Jordan Thompson	M	1	—	—	—	—	—	—	—	—	—	—	1 (**2024**)	—
50	Olivia Gadecki	W	1	—	—	1 (**2025**)	—	—	—	—	—	—	—	—	—

=== Austria ===
No.	Player	M/W	Total	Australian Open			French Open			Wimbledon			US Open		
No.	Player	M/W	Total	Singles	Doubles	Mixed	Singles	Doubles	Mixed	Singles	Doubles	Mixed	Singles	Doubles	Mixed
1	Thomas Muster	M	1	—	—	—	1 (**1995**)	—	—	—	—	—	—	—	—
2	Julian Knowle	M	1	—	—	—	—	—	—	—	—	—	—	1 (**2007**)	—
3	Jürgen Melzer	M	**3**	—	—	—	—	—	—	—	1 (**2010**)	1 (2011)	—	1 (2011)	—
4	Oliver Marach	M	1	—	1 (**2018**)	—	—	—	—	—	—	—	—	—	—
5	Alexander Peya	M	1	—	—	—	—	—	—	—	—	1 (**2018**)	—	—	—
6	Dominic Thiem	M	1	—	—	—	—	—	—	—	—	—	1 (**2020**)	—	—

=== Bahamas ===
No.	Player	M/W	Total	Australian Open			French Open			Wimbledon			US Open		
No.	Player	M/W	Total	Singles	Doubles	Mixed	Singles	Doubles	Mixed	Singles	Doubles	Mixed	Singles	Doubles	Mixed
1	Mark Knowles	M	**4**	—	1 (**2002**)	—	—	1 (2007)	—	—	—	1 (2009)	—	1 (2004)	—

=== Belarus ===
No.	Player	M/W	Total	Australian Open			French Open			Wimbledon			US Open		
No.	Player	M/W	Total	Singles	Doubles	Mixed	Singles	Doubles	Mixed	Singles	Doubles	Mixed	Singles	Doubles	Mixed
1	Natasha Zvereva (Note: Also see Soviet Union)	W	**18** (**22**)	—	3 (1993) ☆	1 (1995)	—	5 (**1992**)	—	—	4 (1992)	—	—	3 (1992)	—
2	Max Mirnyi	M	10	—	—	—	—	4 (2005)	—	—	—	1 (**1998**)	—	2 (2000)	3 (1998)
3	Victoria Azarenka	W	4	2 (2012)	—	—	—	—	1 (2008)	—	—	—	—	—	1 (**2007**)
4	Aryna Sabalenka	W	2	–	1 (2021)	—	—	—	—	—	—	—	–	1 (**2019**)	—

- Note - On 1 March 2022, the WTA announced that players from Belarus will not be allowed to compete under the name or flag of Belarus following the 2022 Russian invasion of Ukraine.

=== Belgium ===
No.	Player	M/W	Total	Australian Open			French Open			Wimbledon			US Open		
No.	Player	M/W	Total	Singles	Doubles	Mixed	Singles	Doubles	Mixed	Singles	Doubles	Mixed	Singles	Doubles	Mixed
1	Justine Henin	W	**7**	1 (2004)	—	—	4 (**2003**)	—	—	—	—	—	2 (2003)	—	—
2	Kim Clijsters	W	6	1 (2011)	—	—	—	1 (**2003**)	—	—	1 (2003)	—	3 (2005)	—	—
3	Xavier Malisse	M	1	—	—	—	—	1 (**2004**)	—	—	—	—	—	—	—
4	Olivier Rochus	M	1	—	—	—	—	1 (**2004**)	—	—	—	—	—	—	—
5	Elise Mertens	W	6	—	3 (2021)	—	—	—	—	—	2 (2021)	—	—	1 (**2019**)	—

=== Brazil ===
No.	Player	M/W	Total	Australian Open			French Open			Wimbledon			US Open		
No.	Player	M/W	Total	Singles	Doubles	Mixed	Singles	Doubles	Mixed	Singles	Doubles	Mixed	Singles	Doubles	Mixed
1	Maria Bueno	W	1 (+18)†	—	—	—	—	—	—	—	—	—	—	1 (**1968**)	—
2	Thomaz Koch	M	1	—	—	—	—	—	1 (**1975**)	—	—	—	—	—	—
3	Gustavo Kuerten	M	3	—	—	—	3 (**1997**)	—	—	—	—	—	—	—	—
4	Bruno Soares	M	**6**	—	1 (2016)	1 (2016)	—	—	—	—	—	—	—	2 (2016)	2 (**2012**)
5	Marcelo Melo	M	2	—	—	—	—	1 (**2015**)	—	—	1 (2017)	—	—	—	—
6	Rafael Matos	M	1	—	—	1 (**2023**)	—	—	—	—	—	—	—	—	—
7	Luisa Stefani	W	1	—	—	1 (**2023**)	—	—	—	—	—	—	—	—	—

=== Bulgaria ===
No.	Player	M/W	Total	Australian Open			French Open			Wimbledon			US Open		
No.	Player	M/W	Total	Singles	Doubles	Mixed	Singles	Doubles	Mixed	Singles	Doubles	Mixed	Singles	Doubles	Mixed
1	Manuela Maleeva	W	**1**	—	—	—	—	—	—	—	—	—	—	—	1 (**1984**)

=== Canada ===
No.	Player	M/W	Total	Australian Open			French Open			Wimbledon			US Open		
No.	Player	M/W	Total	Singles	Doubles	Mixed	Singles	Doubles	Mixed	Singles	Doubles	Mixed	Singles	Doubles	Mixed
1	Sébastien Lareau	M	1	—	—	—	—	—	—	—	—	—	—	1 (**1999**)	—
2	Daniel Nestor	M	**12**	—	1 (**2002**)	3 (2007)	—	4 (2007)	—	—	2 (2008) ☆	1 (2013)	—	1 (2004)	—
3	Vasek Pospisil	M	1	—	—	—	—	—	—	—	1 (**2014**)	—	—	—	—
4	Gabriela Dabrowski	W	4	—	—	1 (2018)	—	—	1 (**2017**)	—	—	—	—	2 (2023)	—
5	Bianca Andreescu	W	1	—	—	—	—	—	—	—	—	—	1 (**2019**)	—	—

=== China ===
No.	Player	M/W	Total	Australian Open			French Open			Wimbledon			US Open		
No.	Player	M/W	Total	Singles	Doubles	Mixed	Singles	Doubles	Mixed	Singles	Doubles	Mixed	Singles	Doubles	Mixed
1	Yan Zi	W	**2**	—	1 (**2006**)	—	—	—	—	—	1 (2006)	—	—	—	—
2	Zheng Jie	W	**2**	—	1 (**2006**)	—	—	—	—	—	1 (2006)	—	—	—	—
3	Sun Tiantian	W	1	—	—	1 (**2008**)	—	—	—	—	—	—	—	—	—
4	Na Li	W	**2**	1 (2014)	—	—	1 (**2011**)	—	—	—	—	—	—	—	—
5	Peng Shuai	W	**2**	—	—	—	—	1 (2014)	—	—	1 (**2013**)	—	—	—	—
6	Zhang Shuai	W	**2**	—	1 (**2019**)	—	—	—	—	—	—	—	—	1 (2021)	—
7	Wang Xinyu	W	1	—	—	—	—	1 (**2023**)	—	—	—	—	—	—	—
8	Guo Hanyu	W	1	—	—	—	—	—	—	—	1 (**2026**)	—	—	—	—

=== Colombia ===
No.	Player	M/W	Total	Australian Open			French Open			Wimbledon			US Open		
No.	Player	M/W	Total	Singles	Doubles	Mixed	Singles	Doubles	Mixed	Singles	Doubles	Mixed	Singles	Doubles	Mixed
1	Iván Molina	M	1	—	—	—	—	—	1 (**1974**)	—	—	—	—	—	—
2	Juan Sebastián Cabal	M	**3**	—	—	1 (**2017**)	—	—	—	—	1 (2019)	—	—	1 (2019)	—
3	Robert Farah	M	2	—	—		—	—	—	—	1 (**2019**)	—	—	1 (2019)	—

=== Croatia ===
- Croatia declared its independence from Yugoslavia on June 25, 1991.

No.	Player	M/W	Total	Australian Open			French Open			Wimbledon			US Open		
No.	Player	M/W	Total	Singles	Doubles	Mixed	Singles	Doubles	Mixed	Singles	Doubles	Mixed	Singles	Doubles	Mixed
1	Iva Majoli	W	1	—	—	—	1 (**1997**)	—	—	—	—	—	—	—	—
2	Mirjana Lučić	W	1	—	1 (**1998**)	—	—	—	—	—	—	—	—	—	—
3	Goran Ivanišević	M	1	—	—	—	—	—	—	1 (**2001**)	—	—	—	—	—
4	Marin Čilić	M	1	—	—	—	—	—	—	—	—	—	1 (**2014**)	—	—
5	Ivan Dodig	M	**7**	—	1 (2021)	1 (2022)	—	2 (**2015**)	2 (2018)	—	—	1 (2019)	—	—	—
6	Mate Pavić	M	**7**	—	1 (2018)	1 (2018)	—	1 (2024)	—	—	1 (2021)	1 (2023)	—	1 (2020)	1 (**2016**)
7	Nikola Mektić	M	2	—	—	1 (**2020**)	—	—	—	—	1 (2021)	—	—	—	—

=== Czech Republic ===
No.	Player	M/W	Total	Australian Open			French Open			Wimbledon			US Open		
No.	Player	M/W	Total	Singles	Doubles	Mixed	Singles	Doubles	Mixed	Singles	Doubles	Mixed	Singles	Doubles	Mixed
1	Helena Suková	W	6 (14)	—	—	—	—	—	—	—	1 (1996)	3 (1994)	—	1 (**1993**)	1 (1993)
2	Jana Novotná	W	8 (**17**)	—	1 (1995)	—	—	1 (1998)	—	1 (1998)	2 (1995)	—	—	3 (**1994**) ☆	—
3	Cyril Suk	M	3 (5)	—	—	—	—	1 (1998)	—	—	—	2 (**1996**)	—	—	—
4	Petr Korda	M	2	1 (1998)	1 (**1996**)	—	—	—	—	—	—	—	—	—	—
5	Daniel Vacek	M	3	—	—	—	—	—	—	—	2 (**1996**)	—	—	1 (1997)	—
6	Leoš Friedl	M	1	—	—	—	—	—	—	—	—	1 (**2001**)	—	—	—
7	Martin Damm	M	1	—	—	—	—	—	—	—	—	—	—	1 (**2006**)	—
8	Lukáš Dlouhý	M	2	—	—	—	—	1 (**2009**)	—	—	—	—	—	1 (2009)	—
9	Andrea Hlaváčková	W	3	—	—	—	—	1 (**2011**)	—	—	—	—	—	1 (2013)	1 (2013)
10	Lucie Hradecká	W	3	—	—	—	—	1 (**2011**)	1 (2013)	—	—	—	—	1 (2013)	—
11	Iveta Benešová	W	1	—	—	—	—	—	—	—	—	1 (**2011**)	—	—	—
12	Petra Kvitová	W	2	—	—	—	—	—	—	2 (**2011**)	—	—	—	—	—
13	Květa Peschke	W	1	—	—	—	—	—	—	—	1 (**2011**)	—	—	—	—
14	Radek Štěpánek	M	2	—	1 (**2012**)	—	—	—	—	—	—	—	—	1 (2013)	—
15	František Čermák	M	1	—	—	—	—	—	1 (**2013**)	—	—	—	—	—	—
16	Lucie Šafářová	W	5	—	2 (**2015**)	—	—	2 (2015)	—	—	—	—	—	1 (2016)	—
17	Barbora Krejčíková	W	**12**	—	2 (2022)	3 (2019)	1 (2021)	2 (**2018**)	—	1 (2024)	2 (2018)	—	—	1 (2022) ☆	—
18	Kateřina Siniaková	W	**12**	—	3 (2022)	—	—	4 (**2018**)	—	—	3 (2018)	1 (2025)	—	2 (2022) ☆	—
19	Barbora Strýcová	W	2	—	—	—	—	—	—	—	2 (**2019**)	—	—	—	—
20	Markéta Vondroušová	W	1	—	—	—	—	—	—	1 (**2023**)	—	—	—	—	—
21	Linda Nosková	W	1	—	—	—	—	—	—	1 (**2026**)	—	—	—	—	—

=== Czechoslovakia (1945–1992) ===
No.	Player	M/W	Total	Australian Open			French Open			Wimbledon			US Open		
No.	Player	M/W	Total	Singles	Doubles	Mixed	Singles	Doubles	Mixed	Singles	Doubles	Mixed	Singles	Doubles	Mixed
1	Jan Kodeš	M	3	—	—	—	2 (**1970**)	—	—	1 (1973)	—	—	—	—	—
2	Martina Navratilova (Note: Also see United States)	W	2 (**59**)	—	—	—	—	1 (1975)	1 (**1974**)	—	—	—	—	—	—
3	Regina Maršíková	W	1	—	—	—	—	1 (**1977**)	—	—	—	—	—	—	—
4	Renáta Tomanová	W	2	—	1 (1978^{Dec})	—	—	—	1 (**1978**)	—	—	—	—	—	—
5	Pavel Složil	M	1	—	—	—	—	—	1 (**1978**)	—	—	—	—	—	—
6	Hana Mandlíková (Note: Also see Australia)	W	4 (5)	2 (**1980^{Dec}**)	—	—	1 (1981)	—	—	—	—	—	1 (1985)	—	—
7	Ivan Lendl	M	8	2 (1989)	—	—	3 (**1984**)	—	—	—	—	—	3 (1985)	—	—
8	Tomáš Šmíd	M	2	—	—	—	—	1 (1986)	—	—	—	—	—	1 (**1984**)	—
9	Helena Suková (Note: Also see Czech Republic)	W	8 (14)	—	2 (1990)	—	—	1 (1990) ☆	1 (1991)	—	3 (1987)	—	—	1 (**1985**)	—
10	Jana Novotná	W	**9** (17)	—	1 (1990)	2 (**1988**)	—	2 (1990)	—	—	2 (1989)	1 (1989)	—	—	1 (1988)
11	Cyril Suk	M	2 (5)	—	—	—	—	—	1 (**1991**)	—	—	1 (1992)	—	—	—

=== Denmark ===
No.	Player	M/W	Total	Australian Open			French Open			Wimbledon			US Open		
No.	Player	M/W	Total	Singles	Doubles	Mixed	Singles	Doubles	Mixed	Singles	Doubles	Mixed	Singles	Doubles	Mixed
1	Frederik Nielsen	M	**1**	—	—	—	—	—	—	—	1 (**2012**)	—	—	—	—
2	Caroline Wozniacki	W	**1**	1 (**2018**)	—	—	—	—	—	—	—	—	—	—	—

=== Ecuador ===
No.	Player	M/W	Total	Australian Open			French Open			Wimbledon			US Open		
No.	Player	M/W	Total	Singles	Doubles	Mixed	Singles	Doubles	Mixed	Singles	Doubles	Mixed	Singles	Doubles	Mixed
1	Andrés Gómez	M	**3**	—	—	—	1 (1990)	1 (1988)	—	—	—	—	—	1 (**1986**)	—

=== El Salvador ===
No.	Player	M/W	Total	Australian Open			French Open			Wimbledon			US Open		
No.	Player	M/W	Total	Singles	Doubles	Mixed	Singles	Doubles	Mixed	Singles	Doubles	Mixed	Singles	Doubles	Mixed
1	Marcelo Arévalo	M	**3**	—	—	—	—	2 (**2022**)	—	—	—	1 (2026)	—	—	—

=== Finland ===
No.	Player	M/W	Total	Australian Open			French Open			Wimbledon			US Open		
No.	Player	M/W	Total	Singles	Doubles	Mixed	Singles	Doubles	Mixed	Singles	Doubles	Mixed	Singles	Doubles	Mixed
1	Henri Kontinen	M	2	—	1 (2017)	—	—	—	—	—	—	1 (**2016**)	—	—	—
2	Harri Heliövaara	M	**4**	—	1 (2025)	—	—	—	—	—	2 (2024)	—	—	—	1 (**2023**)

=== France ===
No.	Player	M/W	Total	Australian Open			French Open			Wimbledon			US Open		
No.	Player	M/W	Total	Singles	Doubles	Mixed	Singles	Doubles	Mixed	Singles	Doubles	Mixed	Singles	Doubles	Mixed
1	Françoise Dürr	W	**10** (+2)†	—	—	—	—	4 (**1968**)	3 (1968)	—	—	1 (1976)	—	2 (1969)	—
2	Jean-Claude Barclay	M	3	—	—	—	—	—	3 (**1968**)	—	—	—	—	—	—
3	Gail Chanfreau	W	3 (+1)†	—	—	—	—	3 (**1970**)	—	—	—	—	—	—	—
4	Pierre Barthès	M	1	—	—	—	—	—	—	—	—	—	—	1 (**1970**)	—
5	Yannick Noah	M	2	—	—	—	1 (**1983**)	1 (1984)	—	—	—	—	—	—	—
6	Henri Leconte	M	1	—	—	—	—	1 (**1984**)	—	—	—	—	—	—	—
7	Mary Pierce	W	4	1 (**1995**)	—	—	1 (2000)	1 (2000)	—	—	—	1 (2005)	—	—	—
8	Julie Halard-Decugis	W	1	—	—	—	—	—	—	—	—	—	—	1 (**2000**)	—
9	Michaël Llodra	M	3	—	2 (**2003**)	—	—	—	—	—	1 (2007)	—	—	—	—
10	Fabrice Santoro	M	3	—	2 (**2003**)	—	—	—	1 (2005)	—	—	—	—	—	—
11	Richard Gasquet	M	1	—	—	—	—	—	1 (**2004**)	—	—	—	—	—	—
12	Tatiana Golovin	W	1	—	—	—	—	—	1 (**2004**)	—	—	—	—	—	—
13	Amélie Mauresmo	W	2	1 (**2006**)	—	—	—	—	—	1 (2006)	—	—	—	—	—
14	Nathalie Dechy	W	3	—	—	—	—	—	1 (2007)	—	—	—	—	2 (**2006**)	—
15	Arnaud Clément	M	1	—	—	—	—	—	—	—	1 (**2007**)	—	—	—	—
16	Kristina Mladenovic	W	**10**	—	2 (2018)	2 (2014)	—	4 (2016)	—	—	1 (2026)	1 (**2013**)	—	—	—
17	Marion Bartoli	W	1	—	—	—	—	—	—	1 (**2013**)	—	—	—	—	—
18	Julien Benneteau	M	1	—	—	—	—	1 (**2014**)	—	—	—	—	—	—	—
19	Édouard Roger-Vasselin	M	2	—	—	—	—	1 (**2014**)	1 (2024)	—	—	—	—	—	—
20	Pierre-Hugues Herbert	M	5	—	1 (2019) ☆	—	—	2 (2018)	—	—	1 (2016)	—	—	1 (**2015**)	—
21	Nicolas Mahut	M	5	—	1 (2019) ☆	—	—	2 (2018)	—	—	1 (2016)	—	—	1 (**2015**)	—
22	Caroline Garcia	W	2	—	—	—	—	2 (**2016**)	—	—	—	—	—	—	—

=== Germany ===
No.	Player	M/W	Total	Australian Open			French Open			Wimbledon			US Open		
No.	Player	M/W	Total	Singles	Doubles	Mixed	Singles	Doubles	Mixed	Singles	Doubles	Mixed	Singles	Doubles	Mixed
1	Boris Becker	M	6	2 (1991)	—	—	—	—	—	3 (**1985**)	—	—	1 (1989)	—	—
2	Claudia Kohde-Kilsch	W	2	—	—	—	—	—	—	—	1 (1987)	—	—	1 (**1985**)	—
3	Steffi Graf	W	**23**	4 (1988)	—	—	6 (**1987**)	—	—	7 (1988)	1 (1988)	—	5 (1988) ☆	—	—
4	Michael Stich	M	2	—	—	—	—	—	—	1 (**1991**)	1 (1992)	—	—	—	—
5	Anna-Lena Grönefeld	W	2	—	—	—	—	—	1 (2014)	—	—	1 (**2009**)	—	—	—
6	Philipp Petzschner	M	2	—	—	—	—	—	—	—	1 (**2010**)	—	—	1 (2011)	—
7	Angelique Kerber	W	3	1 (**2016**)	—	—	—	—	—	1 (2018)	—	—	1 (2016)	—	—
8	Laura Siegemund	W	3	—	—	—	—	—	1 (2024)	—	—	—	—	1 (2020)	1 (**2016**)
9	Kevin Krawietz	M	2	—	—	—	—	2 (**2019**)	—	—	—	—	—	—	—
10	Andreas Mies	M	2	—	—	—	—	2 (**2019**)	—	—	—	—	—	—	—
11	Tim Pütz	M	1	—	—	—	—	—	1 (**2023**)	—	—	—	—	—	—
12	Alexander Zverev	M	2	—	—	—	1 (**2026**)	—	—	—	—	—	1 (2026)	—	—

=== Hungary ===
No.	Player	M/W	Total	Australian Open			French Open			Wimbledon			US Open		
No.	Player	M/W	Total	Singles	Doubles	Mixed	Singles	Doubles	Mixed	Singles	Doubles	Mixed	Singles	Doubles	Mixed
1	Balázs Taróczy	M	2	—	—	—	—	1 (**1981**)	—	—	1 (1985)	—	—	—	—
2	Andrea Temesvári	W	1	—	—	—	—	1 (**1986**)	—	—	—	—	—	—	—
3	Tímea Babos	W	**4**	—	2 (**2018**)	—	—	2 (2019)	—	—	—	—	—	—	—

=== India ===
No.	Player	M/W	Total	Australian Open			French Open			Wimbledon			US Open		
No.	Player	M/W	Total	Singles	Doubles	Mixed	Singles	Doubles	Mixed	Singles	Doubles	Mixed	Singles	Doubles	Mixed
1	Mahesh Bhupathi	M	12	—	—	2 (2006) ☆	—	2 (1999)	2 (**1997**)	—	1 (1999)	2 (2002)	—	1 (2002)	2 (1999)
2	Leander Paes	M	**18**	—	1 (2012) ☆	3 (2003)	—	3 (**1999**)	1 (2016) ☆	—	1 (1999)	4 (1999)	—	3 (2006)	2 (2008)
3	Sania Mirza	W	6	—	1 (2016)	1 (**2009**)	—	—	1 (2012)	—	1 (2015)	—	—	1 (2015)	1 (2014)
4	Rohan Bopanna	M	2	—	1 (2024)	—	—	—	1 (**2017**)	—	—	—	—	—	—

=== Israel ===
No.	Player	M/W	Total	Australian Open			French Open			Wimbledon			US Open		
No.	Player	M/W	Total	Singles	Doubles	Mixed	Singles	Doubles	Mixed	Singles	Doubles	Mixed	Singles	Doubles	Mixed
1	Andy Ram	M	**3**	—	1 (2008)	—	—	—	1 (2007)	—	—	1 (**2006**)	—	—	—
2	Jonathan Erlich	M	1	—	1 (**2008**)	—	—	—	—	—	—	—	—	—	—

=== Italy ===
No.	Player	M/W	Total	Australian Open			French Open			Wimbledon			US Open		
No.	Player	M/W	Total	Singles	Doubles	Mixed	Singles	Doubles	Mixed	Singles	Doubles	Mixed	Singles	Doubles	Mixed
1	Adriano Panatta	M	1	—	—	—	1 (**1976**)	—	—	—	—	—	—	—	—
2	Raffaella Reggi	W	1	—	—	—	—	—	—	—	—	—	—	—	1 (**1986**)
3	Mara Santangelo	W	1	—	—	—	—	1 (**2007**)	—	—	—	—	—	—	—
4	Francesca Schiavone	W	1	—	—	—	1 (**2010**)	—	—	—	—	—	—	—	—
5	Flavia Pennetta	W	2	—	1 (**2011**)	—	—	—	—	—	—	—	1 (2015)	—	—
6	Sara Errani	W	**10**	—	2 (2013)	—	—	2 (**2012**)	2 (2025)	—	1 (2014) ☆	—	—	1 (2012)	2 (2024)
7	Roberta Vinci	W	5	—	2 (2013)	—	—	1 (**2012**)	—	—	1 (2014) ☆	—	—	1 (2012)	—
8	Simone Bolelli	M	1	—	1 (**2015**)	—	—	—	—	—	—	—	—	—	—
9	Fabio Fognini	M	1	—	1 (**2015**)	—	—	—	—	—	—	—	—	—	—
10	Jannik Sinner	M	5	2 (**2024**)	—	—	—	—	—	2 (**2025**)	—	—	1 (2024)	—	—
11	Andrea Vavassori	M	4	—	—	—	—	—	2 (2025)	—	—	—	—	—	2 (**2024**)
12	Jasmine Paolini	W	1	—	—	—	—	1 (**2025**)	—	—	—	—	—	—	—

=== Japan ===
No.	Player	M/W	Total	Australian Open			French Open			Wimbledon			US Open		
No.	Player	M/W	Total	Singles	Doubles	Mixed	Singles	Doubles	Mixed	Singles	Doubles	Mixed	Singles	Doubles	Mixed
1	Kazuko Sawamatsu	W	1	—	—	—	—	—	—	—	1 (**1975**)	—	—	—	—
2	Rika Hiraki	W	1	—	—	—	—	—	1 (**1997**)	—	—	—	—	—	—
3	Ai Sugiyama	W	**4**	—	—	—	—	1 (2003)	—	—	1 (2003)	—	—	1 (2000)	1 (**1999**)
4	Naomi Osaka	W	**4**	2 (2019)	—	—	—	—	—	—	—	—	2 (**2018**)	—	—
5	Ena Shibahara	W	1	—	—	—	—	—	1 (**2022**)	—	—	—	—	—	—
6	Miyu Kato	W	1	—	—	—	—	—	1 (**2023**)	—	—	—	—	—	—

=== Kazakhstan ===
- Kazakhstan declared its independence from the Soviet Union on December 16, 1991.

No.	Player	M/W	Total	Australian Open			French Open			Wimbledon			US Open		
No.	Player	M/W	Total	Singles	Doubles	Mixed	Singles	Doubles	Mixed	Singles	Doubles	Mixed	Singles	Doubles	Mixed
1	Yaroslava Shvedova	W	2	—	—	—	—	—	—	—	1 (**2010**)	—	—	1 (2010)	—
2	Elena Rybakina	W	**3**	1 (2026)	—	—	—	—	—	1 (**2022**)	—	—	1 (2026)	—	—
3	Anna Danilina	W	1	—	—	—	—	—	—	—	—	—	—	—	1 (**2023**)

=== Latvia ===
No.	Player	M/W	Total	Australian Open			French Open			Wimbledon			US Open		
No.	Player	M/W	Total	Singles	Doubles	Mixed	Singles	Doubles	Mixed	Singles	Doubles	Mixed	Singles	Doubles	Mixed
1	Larisa Savchenko (see also: Soviet Union)	W	**4** (6)	—	—	2 (1994)	—	—	1 (1995)	—	—	1 (**1992**)	—	—	—
2	Jeļena Ostapenko	W	3	—	—	—	1 (**2017**)	—	—	—	—	1 (2026)	—	1 (2024)	—

=== Mexico ===
No.	Player	M/W	Total	Australian Open			French Open			Wimbledon			US Open		
No.	Player	M/W	Total	Singles	Doubles	Mixed	Singles	Doubles	Mixed	Singles	Doubles	Mixed	Singles	Doubles	Mixed
1	Raúl Ramírez	M	**3**	—	—	—	—	2 (**1975**)	—	—	1 (1976)	—	—	—	—
2	Jorge Lozano	M	2	—	—	—	—	—	2 (**1988**)	—	—	—	—	—	—

=== Netherlands ===
No.	Player	M/W	Total	Australian Open			French Open			Wimbledon			US Open		
No.	Player	M/W	Total	Singles	Doubles	Mixed	Singles	Doubles	Mixed	Singles	Doubles	Mixed	Singles	Doubles	Mixed
1	Betty Stöve	W	**10**	—	—	—	—	2 (**1972**)	—	—	1 (1972)	2 (1978)	—	3 (1972)	2 (1977)
2	Tom Okker	M	2	—	—	—	—	1 (**1973**)	—	—	—	—	—	1 (1976)	—
3	Manon Bollegraf	W	4	—	—	1 (1997)	—	—	1 (**1989**)	—	—	—	—	—	2 (1991)
4	Tom Nijssen	M	2	—	—	—	—	—	1 (**1989**)	—	—	—	—	—	1 (1991)
5	Jacco Eltingh	M	6	—	2 (**1994**)	—	—	2 (1995)	—	—	1 (1998) ☆	—	—	1 (1994)	—
6	Paul Haarhuis	M	6	—	1 (**1994**)	—	—	3 (1995)	—	—	1 (1998) ☆	—	—	1 (1994)	—
7	Kristie Boogert	W	1	—	—	—	—	—	1 (**1994**)	—	—	—	—	—	—
8	Menno Oosting	M	1	—	—	—	—	—	1 (**1994**)	—	—	—	—	—	—
9	Richard Krajicek	M	1	—	—	—	—	—	—	1 (**1996**)	—	—	—	—	—
10	Jean-Julien Rojer	M	4	—	—	—	—	1 (2022)	1 (**2014**)	—	1 (2015)	—	—	1 (2017)	—
11	Wesley Koolhof	M	2	—	—	—	—	—	1 (**2022**)	—	1 (2023)	—	—	—	—
12	Sem Verbeek	M	1	—	—	—	—	—	—	—	—	1 (**2025**)	—	—	—

=== New Zealand ===
No.	Player	M/W	Total	Australian Open			French Open			Wimbledon			US Open		
No.	Player	M/W	Total	Singles	Doubles	Mixed	Singles	Doubles	Mixed	Singles	Doubles	Mixed	Singles	Doubles	Mixed
1	Onny Parun	M	**1**	—	—	—	—	1 (**1974**)	—	—	—	—	—	—	—
2	Judy Connor	W	**1**	—	1 (**1979^{Dec}**)	—	—	—	—	—	—	—	—	—	—
3	Michael Venus	M	**1**	—	—	—	—	1 (**2017**)	—	—	—	—	—	—	—
4	Erin Routliffe	W	**2**	—	—	—	—	—	—	—	—	—	—	2 (**2023**)	—

=== Peru ===
No.	Player	M/W	Total	Australian Open			French Open			Wimbledon			US Open		
No.	Player	M/W	Total	Singles	Doubles	Mixed	Singles	Doubles	Mixed	Singles	Doubles	Mixed	Singles	Doubles	Mixed
1	Luis Horna	M	**1**	—	—	—	—	1 (**2008**)	—	—	—	—	—	—	—

=== Poland ===
No.	Player	M/W	Total	Australian Open			French Open			Wimbledon			US Open		
No.	Player	M/W	Total	Singles	Doubles	Mixed	Singles	Doubles	Mixed	Singles	Doubles	Mixed	Singles	Doubles	Mixed
1	Wojciech Fibak	M	1	—	1 (**1978^{Dec}**)	—	—	—	—	—	—	—	—	—	—
2	Łukasz Kubot	M	2	—	1 (**2014**)	—	—	—	—	—	1 (2017)	—	—	—	—
3	Iga Świątek	W	**6**	—	—	—	4 (**2020**)	—	—	1 (2025)	—	—	1 (2022)	—	—
4	Jan Zieliński	M	2	—	—	1 (**2024**)	—	—	—	–	—	1 (2024)	—	—	–

=== Romania ===
No.	Player	M/W	Total	Australian Open			French Open			Wimbledon			US Open		
No.	Player	M/W	Total	Singles	Doubles	Mixed	Singles	Doubles	Mixed	Singles	Doubles	Mixed	Singles	Doubles	Mixed
1	Ilie Năstase	M	**7**	—	—	—	1 (1973)	1 (**1970**)	—	—	1 (1973)	2 (1970)	1 (1972)	1 (1975)	—
2	Ion Țiriac	M	1	—	—	—	—	1 (**1970**)	—	—	—	—	—	—	—
3	Virginia Ruzici	W	2	—	—	—	1 (**1978**)	1 (1978)	—	—	—	—	—	—	—
4	Horia Tecău	M	3	—	—	1 (**2012**)	—	—	—	—	1 (2015)	—	—	1 (2017)	—
5	Simona Halep	W	2	—	—	—	1 (**2018**)	—	—	1 (2019)	—	—	—	—	—

=== Russia (1992–present) ===
No.	Player	M/W	Total	Australian Open			French Open			Wimbledon			US Open		
No.	Player	M/W	Total	Singles	Doubles	Mixed	Singles	Doubles	Mixed	Singles	Doubles	Mixed	Singles	Doubles	Mixed
1	Eugenia Maniokova	W	1	—	—	—	—	—	1 (**1993**)	—	—	—	—	—	—
2	Andrei Olhovskiy	M	2	—	—	1 (1994)	—	—	1 (**1993**)	—	—	—	—	—	—
3	Yevgeny Kafelnikov	M	**6**	1 (1999)	—	—	1 (1996)	3 (**1996**)	—	—	—	—	—	1 (1997)	—
4	Anna Kournikova	W	2	—	2 (**1999**)	—	—	—	—	—	—	—	—	—	—
5	Marat Safin	M	2	1 (2005)	—	—	—	—	—	—	—	—	1 (**2000**)	—	—
6	Elena Likhovtseva	W	2	—	—	1 (2007)	—	—	—	—	—	1 (**2002**)	—	—	—
7	Elena Bovina	W	1	—	—	1 (**2004**)	—	—	—	—	—	—	—	—	—
8	Anastasia Myskina	W	1	—	—	—	1 (**2004**)	—	—	—	—	—	—	—	—
9	Maria Sharapova	W	5	1 (2008)	—	—	2 (2012) ☆	—	—	1 (**2004**)	—	—	1 (2006)	—	—
10	Vera Zvonareva	W	5	—	1 (2012)	—	—	—	—	—	—	1 (2006)	—	2 (2006)	1 (**2004**)
11	Svetlana Kuznetsova	W	4	—	2 (2005)	—	1 (2009)	—	—	—	—	—	1 (**2004**)	—	—
12	Dinara Safina	W	1	—	—	—	—	—	—	—	—	—	—	1 (**2007**)	—
13	Ekaterina Makarova	W	4	—	—	—	—	1 (2013)	—	—	1 (2017)	—	—	1 (2014)	1 (**2012**)
14	Elena Vesnina	W	4	—	—	1 (2016)	—	1 (**2013**)	—	—	1 (2017)	—	—	1 (2014)	—
15	Daniil Medvedev	M	1	—	—	—	—	—	—	—	—	—	1 (**2021**)	—	—

- Note - On 1 March 2022, the WTA announced that players from the Russian Federation will not be allowed to compete under the name or flag of Russia following the 2022 Russian invasion of Ukraine.

=== Serbia ===
- Serbia recognized the dissolution of its union with Montenegro on June 5, 2006.

No.	Player	M/W	Total	Australian Open			French Open			Wimbledon			US Open		
No.	Player	M/W	Total	Singles	Doubles	Mixed	Singles	Doubles	Mixed	Singles	Doubles	Mixed	Singles	Doubles	Mixed
1	Jelena Janković	W	1	—	—	—	—	—	—	—	—	1 (**2007**)	—	—	—
2	Novak Djokovic	M	**24**	10 (**2008**)	—	—	3 (2016) ☆	—	—	7 (2011)	—	—	4 (2011)	—	—
3	Nenad Zimonjić (Note: Also see Serbia and Montenegro)	M	6 (8)	—	—	1 (**2008**)	—	1 (2010)	1 (2010)	—	2 (2008)	1 (2014)	—	—	—
4	Ana Ivanovic	W	1	—	—	—	1 (**2008**)	—	—	—	—	—	—	—	—

=== Serbia and Montenegro (1992–2006) ===
- Federal Republic of Yugoslavia (28 April 1992 – 3 February 2003)
- Serbia and Montenegro (4 February 2003 – 3 June 2006)

No.	Player	M/W	Total	Australian Open			French Open			Wimbledon			US Open		
No.	Player	M/W	Total	Singles	Doubles	Mixed	Singles	Doubles	Mixed	Singles	Doubles	Mixed	Singles	Doubles	Mixed
1	Monika Seleš (Note: Also see Yugoslavia)	W	**3** (9)	1 (1993)	—	—	1 (**1992**)	—	—	—	—	—	1 (1992)	—	—
2	Nenad Zimonjić (Note: Also see Serbia)	M	2 (8)	—	—	1 (**2004**)	—	—	1 (2006)	—	—	—	—	—	—

=== Slovakia ===
No.	Player	M/W	Total	Australian Open			French Open			Wimbledon			US Open		
No.	Player	M/W	Total	Singles	Doubles	Mixed	Singles	Doubles	Mixed	Singles	Doubles	Mixed	Singles	Doubles	Mixed
1	Daniela Hantuchová	W	**4**	—	—	1 (2002)	—	—	1 (2005)	—	—	1 (**2001**)	—	—	1 (2005) ☆
2	Filip Polášek	M	**1**	—	1 (**2021**)	—	—	—	—	—	—	—	—	—	—

=== Slovenia ===
- Slovenia declared its independence from Yugoslavia on June 25, 1991.

No.	Player	M/W	Total	Australian Open			French Open			Wimbledon			US Open		
No.	Player	M/W	Total	Singles	Doubles	Mixed	Singles	Doubles	Mixed	Singles	Doubles	Mixed	Singles	Doubles	Mixed
1	Katarina Srebotnik	W	**6**	—	—	1 (2011)	—	—	3 (**1999**)	—	1 (2011)	—	—	—	1 (2003)

=== South Africa ===
No.	Player	M/W	Total	Australian Open			French Open			Wimbledon			US Open		
No.	Player	M/W	Total	Singles	Doubles	Mixed	Singles	Doubles	Mixed	Singles	Doubles	Mixed	Singles	Doubles	Mixed
1	Robert Hewitt	M	**9** (+6)†	—	—	—	—	1 (1972)	2 (**1970**)	—	2 (1972)	2 (1977)	—	1 (1977) ☆	1 (1979) ☆
2	Frew McMillan	M	8 (+2)†	—	—	—	—	1 (**1972**)	—	—	2 (1972)	2 (1978)	—	1 (1977)	2 (1977)
3	Cliff Drysdale	M	1	—	—	—	—	—	—	—	—	—	—	1 (**1972**)	—
4	Ilana Kloss	W	2	—	—	—	—	—	1 (**1976**)	—	—	—	—	1 (1976)	—
5	Linky Boshoff	W	1	—	—	—	—	—	—	—	—	—	—	1 (**1976**)	—
6	Greer Stevens	W	3	—	—	—	—	—	—	—	—	2 (**1977**)	—	—	1 (1979)
7	Rosalyn Fairbank	W	2	—	—	—	—	2 (**1981**)	—	—	—	—	—	—	—
8	Tanya Harford	W	1	—	—	—	—	1 (**1981**)	—	—	—	—	—	—	—
9	Kevin Curren	M	4	—	—	—	—	—	—	—	—	1 (1982)	—	1 (1982)	2 (**1981**)
10	Johan Kriek	M	1 (2)	1 (**1981^{Dec}**)	—	—	—	—	—	—	—	—	—	—	—
11	Christo van Rensburg	M	1	—	1 (**1985^{Dec}**)	—	—	—	—	—	—	—	—	—	—
12	Danie Visser	M	3	—	2 (**1990**)	—	—	—	—	—	—	—	—	1 (1990)	—
13	Pieter Aldrich	M	2	—	1 (**1990**)	—	—	—	—	—	—	—	—	1 (1990)	—
14	Elna Reinach	W	1	—	—	—	—	—	—	—	—	—	—	—	1 (**1994**)
15	David Adams	M	2	—	—	1 (**1999**)	—	—	1 (2000)	—	—	—	—	—	—
16	Mariaan de Swardt	W	2	—	—	1 (**1999**)	—	—	1 (2000)	—	—	—	—	—	—
17	Piet Norval	M	1	—	—	—	—	—	1 (**1999**)	—	—	—	—	—	—
18	Ellis Ferreira	M	2	—	1 (**2000**)	1 (2001)	—	—	—	—	—	—	—	—	—
19	Liezel Huber	W	3 (7)	—	1 (2007)	—	—	—	—	—	2 (**2005**)	—	—	—	—
20	Wesley Moodie	M	1	—	—	—	—	—	—	—	1 (**2005**)	—	—	—	—

=== Soviet Union (1922–1991) ===
No.	Player	M/W	Total	Australian Open			French Open			Wimbledon			US Open		
No.	Player	M/W	Total	Singles	Doubles	Mixed	Singles	Doubles	Mixed	Singles	Doubles	Mixed	Singles	Doubles	Mixed
1	Olga Morozova	W	1	—	—	—	—	1 (**1974**)	—	—	—	—	—	—	—
2	Natasha Zvereva (Note: Also see Belarus)	W	**4** (**20**)	—	—	1 (1990)	—	1 (**1989**)	—	—	1 (1991)	—	—	1 (1991)	—
3	Larisa Savchenko (Note: Also see Latvia)	W	2 (6)	—	—	—	—	1 (**1989**)	—	—	1 (1991)	—	—	—	—

=== Spain ===
No.	Player	M/W	Total	Australian Open			French Open			Wimbledon			US Open		
No.	Player	M/W	Total	Singles	Doubles	Mixed	Singles	Doubles	Mixed	Singles	Doubles	Mixed	Singles	Doubles	Mixed
1	Andrés Gimeno	M	1	—	—	—	1 (**1972**)	—	—	—	—	—	—	—	—
2	Manuel Orantes	M	1	—	—	—	—	—	—	—	—	—	1 (**1975**)	—	—
3	Sergio Casal	M	3	—	—	—	—	1 (1990)	—	—	—	—	—	1 (1988)	1 (**1986**)
4	Emilio Sánchez	M	5	—	—	—	—	2 (1988)	1 (**1987**)	—	—	—	—	1 (1988)	1 (1987)
5	Arantxa Sánchez	W	14	—	3 (1992)	1 (1993)	3 (**1989**)	—	2 (1990)	—	1 (1995)	—	1 (1994)	2 (1993)	1 (2000)
6	Sergi Bruguera	M	2	—	—	—	2 (**1993**)	—	—	—	—	—	—	—	—
7	Conchita Martínez	W	1	—	—	—	—	—	—	1 (**1994**)	—	—	—	—	—
8	Carlos Moyá	M	1	—	—	—	1 (**1998**)	—	—	—	—	—	—	—	—
9	Virginia Ruano	W	11	—	1 (2004)	—	—	6 (**2001**)	1 (2001)	—	—	—	—	3 (2002)	—
10	Tomás Carbonell	M	1	—	—	—	—	—	1 (**2001**)	—	—	—	—	—	—
11	Albert Costa	M	1	—	—	—	1 (**2002**)	—	—	—	—	—	—	—	—
12	Juan Carlos Ferrero	M	1	—	—	—	1 (**2003**)	—	—	—	—	—	—	—	—
13	Rafael Nadal	M	**22**	2 (2009)	—	—	14 (**2005**)	—	—	2 (2008)	—	—	4 (2010) ☆	—	—
14	Anabel Medina	W	2	—	—	—	—	2 (**2008**)	—	—	—	—	—	—	—
15	Garbiñe Muguruza	W	2	—	—	—	1 (**2016**)	—	—	1 (2017)	—	—	—	—	—
16	Feliciano López	M	1	—	—	—	—	1 (**2016**)	—	—	—	—	—	—	—
17	Marc López	M	1	—	—	—	—	1 (**2016**)	—	—	—	—	—	—	—
18	Carlos Alcaraz	M	7	1 (2026) ☆	—	—	2 (2024)	—	—	2 (2023)	—	—	2 (**2022**)	—	—
19	Marcel Granollers	M	3	—	—	—	—	2 (**2025**)	—	—	—	—	—	1 (2025)	—

=== Sweden ===
No.	Player	M/W	Total	Australian Open			French Open			Wimbledon			US Open		
No.	Player	M/W	Total	Singles	Doubles	Mixed	Singles	Doubles	Mixed	Singles	Doubles	Mixed	Singles	Doubles	Mixed
1	Björn Borg	M	**11**	—	—	—	6 (**1974**)	—	—	5 (1976)	—	—	—	—	—
2	Mats Wilander	M	8	3 (1983^{Dec})	—	—	3 (**1982**)	—	—	—	1 (1986)	—	1 (1988)	—	—
3	Anders Järryd	M	8	—	1 (1987)	—	—	3 (**1983**)	—	—	2 (1989) ☆	—	—	2 (1987)	—
4	Hans Simonsson	M	1	—	—	—	—	1 (**1983**)	—	—	—	—	—	—	—
5	Stefan Edberg	M	9	2 (**1985^{Dec}**)	2 (1987)	—	—	—	—	2 (1988)	—	—	2 (1991)	1 (1987)	—
6	Joakim Nyström	M	1	—	—	—	—	—	—	—	1 (**1986**)	—	—	—	—
7	Jonas Björkman	M	9	—	3 (**1998**)	—	—	2 (2005) ☆	—	—	3 (2002)	—	—	1 (2003)	—
8	Thomas Johansson	M	1	1 (**2002**)	—	—	—	—	—	—	—	—	—	—	—
9	Simon Aspelin	M	1	—	—	—	—	—	—	—	—	—	—	1 (**2007**)	—
10	Robert Lindstedt	M	1	—	1 (**2014**)	—	—	—	—	—	—	—	—	—	—

=== Switzerland ===
No.	Player	M/W	Total	Australian Open			French Open			Wimbledon			US Open		
No.	Player	M/W	Total	Singles	Doubles	Mixed	Singles	Doubles	Mixed	Singles	Doubles	Mixed	Singles	Doubles	Mixed
1	Heinz Günthardt	M	4	—	—	—	—	1 (**1981**)	1 (1985)	—	1 (1985)	—	—	—	1 (1985)
2	Jakob Hlasek	M	1	—	—	—	—	1 (**1992**)	—	—	—	—	—	—	—
3	Marc Rosset	M	1	—	—	—	—	1 (**1992**)	—	—	—	—	—	—	—
4	Martina Hingis	W	**25**	3 (1997)	5 (1997)	2 (2006)	—	2 (1998)	1 (2016) ☆	1 (1997)	3 (**1996**)	2 (2015)	1 (1997)	3 (1998) ☆	2 (2015)
5	Roger Federer	M	20	6 (2004)	—	—	1 (2009) ☆	—	—	8 (**2003**)	—	—	5 (2004)	—	—
6	Stan Wawrinka	M	3	1 (**2014**)	—	—	1 (2015)	—	—	—	—	—	1 (2016)	—	—

=== Taiwan/Chinese Taipei ===
No.	Player	M/W	Total	Australian Open			French Open			Wimbledon			US Open		
No.	Player	M/W	Total	Singles	Doubles	Mixed	Singles	Doubles	Mixed	Singles	Doubles	Mixed	Singles	Doubles	Mixed
1	Hsieh Su-wei	W	**9**	—	1 (2024)	1 (2024)	—	2 (2014)	—	—	4 (**2013**)	1 (2024)	—	—	—
2	Latisha Chan	W	4	—	—	—	—	—	2 (2018)	—	—	1 (2019)	—	1 (**2017**)	—

=== Ukraine ===
No.	Player	M/W	Total	Australian Open			French Open			Wimbledon			US Open		
No.	Player	M/W	Total	Singles	Doubles	Mixed	Singles	Doubles	Mixed	Singles	Doubles	Mixed	Singles	Doubles	Mixed
1	Alona Bondarenko	W	1	—	1 (**2008**)	—	—	—	—	—	—	—	—	—	—
2	Kateryna Bondarenko	W	1	—	1 (**2008**)	—	—	—	—	—	—	—	—	—	—
3	Lyudmyla Kichenok	W	**2**	—	—	—	—	—	—	—	—	1 (**2023**)	—	1 (2024)	—

=== United Kingdom ===
No.	Player	M/W	Total	Australian Open			French Open			Wimbledon			US Open		
No.	Player	M/W	Total	Singles	Doubles	Mixed	Singles	Doubles	Mixed	Singles	Doubles	Mixed	Singles	Doubles	Mixed
1	Ann Haydon	W	5 (+3)†	—	—	1 (1969)	—	2 (**1968**)	—	1 (1969)	—	1 (1969)	—	—	—
2	Virginia Wade	W	**7**	1 (1972)	1 (1973)	—	—	1 (1973)	—	1 (1977)	—	—	1 (**1968**)	2 (1973)	—
3	Peter Curtis	M	1	—	—	—	—	—	—	—	—	—	—	—	1 (**1968**) (Note: No mixed doubles event was held at the 1968 US Open. Results often listed are those of the 1968 U.S. National Championships held a month earlier in Boston. For more info, see 1968 US Open)
4	Roger Taylor	M	2	—	—	—	—	—	—	—	—	—	—	2 (**1971**)	—
5	Susan Barker	W	1	—	—	—	1 (**1976**)	—	—	—	—	—	—	—	—
6	John Lloyd	M	3	—	—	—	—	—	1 (**1982**)	—	—	2 (1983)	—	—	—
7	Jeremy Bates	M	2	—	—	1 (1991)	—	—	—	—	—	1 (**1987**)	—	—	—
8	Joanna Durie	W	2	—	—	1 (1991)	—	—	—	—	—	1 (**1987**)	—	—	—
9	Jamie Murray	M	**7**	—	1 (2016)	—	—	—	—	—	—	2 (**2007**)	—	1 (2016)	3 (2017)
10	Jonathan Marray	M	1	—	—	—	—	—	—	—	1 (**2012**)	—	—	—	—
11	Andy Murray	M	3	—	—	—	—	—	—	2 (2013)	—	—	1 (**2012**)	—	—
12	Heather Watson	W	1	—	—	—	—	—	—	—	—	1 (**2016**)	—	—	—
13	Joe Salisbury	M	6	—	1 (**2020**)	—	—	—	1 (2021)	—	—	—	—	3 (2021)	1 (2021)
14	Neal Skupski	M	5	—	1 (2026)	—	—	—	—	—	1 (2023)	2 (**2021**)	—	1 (2026)	—
15	Emma Raducanu	W	1	—	—	—	—	—	—	—	—	—	1 (**2021**)	—	—
16	Henry Patten	M	3	—	1 (2025)	—	—	—	—	—	2 (**2024**)	—	—	—	—
17	Julian Cash	M	1	—	—	—	—	—	—	—	1 (**2025**)	—	—	—	—
18	Lloyd Glasspool	M	1	—	—	—	—	—	—	—	1 (**2025**)	—	—	—	—

=== United States ===
No.	Player	M/W	Total	Australian Open			French Open			Wimbledon			US Open		
No.	Player	M/W	Total	Singles	D	M	Singles	D	M	Singles	D	M	Singles	D	M
1	Nancy Richey	W	1 (+5)† (Note: Won additional pre-Open-Era Grand Slam titles (not shown here))	—	—	—	1 (**1968**)	—	—	—	—	—	—	—	—
2	Billie Jean King	W	25 (+14)†	—	—	—	1 (1972) ☆	1 (1972)	1 (1970)	4 (**1968**)	6 (1968)	3 (1971)	3 (1971)	3 (1974)	3 (1971)
3	Rosemary Casals	W	10 (+2)†	—	—	—	—	—	—	—	4 (**1968**)	2 (1970)	—	3 (1971)	1 (1975)
4	Stan Smith	M	7	—	1 (1970)	—	—	—	—	1 (1972)	—	—	1 (1971)	4 (**1968**)	—
5	Bob Lutz	M	5	—	1 (1970)	—	—	—	—	—	—	—	—	4 (**1968**)	—
6	Arthur Ashe	M	5	1 (1970)	1 (1977^{Jan})	—	—	1 (1971)	—	1 (1975)	—	—	1 (**1968**)	—	—
7	Mary-Ann Eisel	W	1	—	—	—	—	—	—	—	—	—	—	—	1 (**1968**)
8	Marty Riessen	M	9	—	—	1 (**1969**)	—	1 (1971)	1 (1969)	—	—	1 (1975) ☆	—	1 (1976)	4 (1969)
9	Darlene Hard	W	1 (+20)†	—	—	—	—	—	—	—	—	—	—	1 (**1969**)	—
10	Jimmy Connors	M	10	1 (1974)	—	—	—	—	—	2 (1974)	1 (**1973**)	—	5 (1974)	1 (1975)	—
11	Peggy Michel	W	3		2 (**1974**)						1 (1974)				
12	Chris Evert	W	21	2 (1982^{Dec}) ☆	—	—	7 (**1974**)	2 (1974)	—	3 (1974)	1 (1976)	—	6 (1975)	—	—
13	Pam Teeguarden	W	2	—	—	—	—	1 (1977)	—	—	—	—	—	—	1 (**1974**)
14	Brian Gottfried	M	3	—	—	—	—	2 (**1975**)	—	—	1 (1976)	—	—	—	—
15	Vitas Gerulaitis	M	2	1 (1977^{Dec})	—	—	—	—	—	—	1 (**1975**)	—	—	—	—
16	Sandy Mayer	M	2	—	—	—	—	1 (1979)	—	—	1 (**1975**)	—	—	—	—
17	Ann Kiyomura	W	1	—	—	—	—	—	—	—	1 (**1975**)	—	—	—	—
18	Dick Stockton	M	2	—	—	—	—	—	1 (1984)	—	—	—	—	—	1 (**1975**)
19	Sherwood Stewart	M	5	—	1 (1984^{Dec})	1 (1987)	—	2 (**1976**)	—	—	—	1 (1988)	—	—	—
20	Fred McNair	M	1	—	—	—	—	1 (**1976**)	—	—	—	—	—	—	—
21	Martina Navratilova	W	**57** (**59**)	3 (1981^{Dec})	8 (1980^{Dec}) ☆	1 (2003) ☆	2 (1982)	6 (1982)	1 (1985)	9 (1978)	7 (**1976**)	4 (1985)	4 (1983) ☆	9 (1977)	3 (1985)
22	Roscoe Tanner	M	1	1 (**1977^{Jan}**)	—	—	—	—	—	—	—	—	—	—	—
23	John McEnroe	M	17	—	—	—	—	—	1 (**1977**)	3 (1981)	5 (1979)	—	4 (1979)	4 (1979)	—
24	Mary Carillo	W	1	—	—	—	—	—	1 (**1977**)	—	—	—	—	—	—
25	JoAnne Russell	W	1	—	—	—	—	—	—	—	1 (**1977**)	—	—	—	—
26	Mona Guerrant	W	1	—	1 (**1977^{Dec}**)	—	—	—	—	—	—	—	—	—	—
27	Gene Mayer	M	2	—	—	—	—	2 (**1978**)	—	—	—	—	—	—	—
28	Hank Pfister	M	2	—	—	—	—	2 (**1978**)	—	—	—	—	—	—	—
29	Betsy Nagelsen	W	2	—	2 (**1978^{Dec}**)	—	—	—	—	—	—	—	—	—	—
30	Peter Fleming	M	7	—	—	—	—	—	—	—	4 (**1979**)	—	—	3 (1979)	—
31	Tracy Austin	W	3	—	—	—	—	—	—	—	—	1 (1980)	2 (**1979**)	—	—
32	Barbara Jordan	W	2	1 (**1979^{Dec}**)	—	—	—	—	1 (1983)	—	—	—	—	—	—
33	Anne Smith	W	10	—	1 (1981^{Dec}) ☆	—	—	2 (**1980**)	2 (1980)	—	1 (1980)	1 (1982)	—	1 (1981)	2 (1981)
34	Kathy Jordan	W	7	—	1 (1981^{Dec}) ☆	—	—	1 (**1980**)	1 (1986)	—	2 (1980)	1 (1986)	—	1 (1981)	—
35	Victor Amaya	M	1	—	—	—	—	1 (**1980**)	—	—	—	—	—	—	—
36	Billy Martin	M	1	—	—	—	—	—	1 (**1980**)	—	—	—	—	—	—
37	John Austin	M	1	—	—	—	—	—	—	—	—	1 (**1980**)	—	—	—
38	Brian Teacher	M	1	1 (**1980^{Dec}**)	—	—	—	—	—	—	—	—	—	—	—
39	Jimmy Arias	M	1	—	—	—	—	—	1 (**1981**)	—	—	—	—	—	—
40	Andrea Jaeger	W	1	—	—	—	—	—	1 (**1981**)	—	—	—	—	—	—
41	Pam Shriver	W	22	—	7 (1982^{Dec})	—	—	4 (1984) ☆	1 (1987)	—	5 (**1981**)	—	—	5 (1983)	—
42	Ferdi Taygan	M	1	—	—	—	—	1 (**1982**)	—	—	—	—	—	—	—
43	Steve Denton	M	1	—	—	—	—	—	—	—	—	—	—	1 (**1982**)	—
44	Johan Kriek (Note: Also see South Africa)	M	1 (2)	1 (**1982^{Dec}**)	—	—	—	—	—	—	—	—	—	—	—
45	Candy Reynolds	W	1	—	—	—	—	1 (**1983**)	—	—	—	—	—	—	—
46	Eliot Teltscher	M	1	—	—	—	—	—	1 (**1983**)	—	—	—	—	—	—
47	Tom Gullikson	M	1	—	—	—	—	—	—	—	—	—	—	—	1 (**1984**)
48	Ken Flach	M	6	—	—	—	—	—	1 (1986)	—	2 (1987)	1 (1986)	—	2 (**1985**)	—
49	Robert Seguso	M	4	—	—	—	—	1 (1987)	—	—	2 (1987)	—	—	1 (**1985**)	—
50	Paul Annacone	M	1	—	1 (**1985^{Dec}**)	—	—	—	—	—	—	—	—	—	—
51	Zina Garrison	W	3	—	—	1 (**1987**)	—	—	—	—	—	2 (1988)	—	—	—
52	Rick Leach	M	9	—	3 (**1988**)	2 (1995)	—	—	—	—	1 (1990)	1 (1990)	—	1 (1993)	1 (1997)
53	Jim Pugh	M	8	—	2 (**1988**)	3 (1988)	—	—	—	—	1 (1990)	1 (1989)	—	—	1 (1988)
54	Lori McNeil	W	1	—	—	—	—	—	1 (**1988**)	—	—	—	—	—	—
55	Gigi Fernández	W	17	—	2 (1993) ☆	—	—	6 (1991)	—	—	4 (1992)	—	—	5 (**1988**)	—
56	Robin White	W	2	—	—	—	—	—	—	—	—	—	—	1 (**1988**)	1 (1989)
57	Jim Grabb	M	2	—	—	—	—	1 (**1989**)	—	—	—	—	—	1 (1992)	—
58	Patrick McEnroe	M	1	—	—	—	—	1 (**1989**)	—	—	—	—	—	—	—
59	Michael Chang	M	1	—	—	—	1 (**1989**)	—	—	—	—	—	—	—	—
60	Shelby Cannon	M	1	—	—	—	—	—	—	—	—	—	—	—	1 (**1989**)
61	Pete Sampras	M	14	2 (1994)	—	—	—	—	—	7 (1993)	—	—	5 (**1990**)	—	—
62	Mary Joe Fernández	W	2	—	1 (**1991**)	—	—	1 (1996)	—	—	—	—	—	—	—
63	Patty Fendick	W	1	—	1 (**1991**)	—	—	—	—	—	—	—	—	—	—
64	David Pate	M	1	—	1 (**1991**)	—	—	—	—	—	—	—	—	—	—
65	Scott Davis	M	1	—	1 (**1991**)	—	—	—	—	—	—	—	—	—	—
66	Jim Courier	M	4	2 (1992)	—	—	2 (**1991**)	—	—	—	—	—	—	—	—
67	Andre Agassi	M	8	4 (1995)	—	—	1 (1999) ☆	—	—	1 (**1992**)	—	—	2 (1994)	—	—
68	Richey Reneberg	M	2	—	1 (1995)	—	—	—	—	—	—	—	—	1 (**1992**)	—
69	Luke Jensen	M	1	—	—	—	—	1 (**1993**)	—	—	—	—	—	—	—
70	Murphy Jensen	M	1	—	—	—	—	1 (**1993**)	—	—	—	—	—	—	—
71	Jonathan Stark	M	2	—	—	—	—	1 (**1994**)	—	—	—	1 (1995)	—	—	—
72	Patrick Galbraith	M	2	—	—	—	—	—	—	—	—	—	—	—	2 (**1994**)
73	Jared Palmer	M	4	—	1 (**1995**)	1 (2000)	—	—	—	—	1 (2001)	—	—	—	1 (2000)
74	Matt Lucena	M	1	—	—	—	—	—	—	—	—	—	—	—	1 (**1995**)
75	Meredith McGrath	W	1	—	—	—	—	—	—	—	—	—	—	—	1 (**1995**)
76	Monica Seles	W	1 (9)	1 (**1996**)	—	—	—	—	—	—	—	—	—	—	—
77	Chanda Rubin	W	1	—	1 (**1996**)	—	—	—	—	—	—	—	—	—	—
78	Lindsay Davenport	W	6	1 (2000)	—	—	—	1 (**1996**)	—	1 (1999)	1 (1999)	—	1 (1998)	1 (1997)	—
79	Lisa Raymond	W	11	—	1 (2000)	—	—	1 (2006) ☆	1 (2003)	—	1 (2001)	2 (1999)	—	3 (2001)	2 (**1996**)
80	Venus Williams	W	23	—	4 (2001) ☆	1 (**1998**)	—	2 (1999)	1 (1998)	5 (2000)	6 (2000)	—	2 (2000)	2 (1999)	—
81	Justin Gimelstob	M	2	—	—	1 (**1998**)	—	—	1 (1998)	—	—	—	—	—	—
82	Serena Williams	W	39	7 (2003) ☆	4 (2001) ☆	—	3 (2002)	2 (1999)	—	7 (2002)	6 (2000)	1 (**1998**)	6 (1999)	2 (1999)	1 (1998)
83	Corina Morariu	W	2	—	—	1 (2001)	—	—	—	—	1 (**1999**)	—	—	—	—
84	Alex O'Brien	M	1	—	—	—	—	—	—	—	—	—	—	1 (**1999**)	—
85	Donald Johnson	M	2	—	—	—	—	—	—	—	1 (2001)	1 (**2000**)	—	—	—
86	Kimberly Po	W	1	—	—	—	—	—	—	—	—	1 (**2000**)	—	—	—
87	Jennifer Capriati	W	3	2 (**2001**)	—	—	1 (2001)	—	—	—	—	—	—	—	—
88	Mike Bryan	M	22	—	6 (2006)	—	—	2 (2003)	2 (2003)	—	4 (2006) ☆	1 (2012)	—	6 (2005)	1 (**2002**)
89	Bob Bryan	M	23	—	6 (2006)	—	—	2 (**2003**)	2 (2008)	—	3 (2006) ☆	1 (2008)	—	5 (2005)	4 (2003)
90	Andy Roddick	M	1	—	—	—	—	—	—	—	—	—	1 (**2003**)	—	—
91	Liezel Huber	W	4 (7)	—	—	—	—	—	1 (2009)	—	—	—	—	2 (**2008**)	1 (2010)
92	Carly Gullickson	W	1	—	—	—	—	—	—	—	—	—	—	—	1 (**2009**)
93	Travis Parrott	M	1	—	—	—	—	—	—	—	—	—	—	—	1 (**2009**)
94	Vania King	W	2	—	—	—	—	—	—	—	1 (**2010**)	—	—	1 (2010)	—
95	Scott Lipsky	M	1	—	—	—	—	—	1 (**2011**)	—	—	—	—	—	—
96	Jack Sock	M	4	—	—	—	—	—	—	—	2 (2014)	—	—	1 (2018)	1 (**2011**)
97	Melanie Oudin	W	1	—	—	—	—	—	—	—	—	—	—	—	1 (**2011**)
98	Bethanie Mattek-Sands	W	9	—	2 (2015)	1 (**2012**)	—	2 (2015)	1 (2015)	—	—	—	—	1 (2016)	2 (2018)
99	Abigail Spears	W	1	—	—	1 (**2017**)	—	—	—	—	—	—	—	—	—
100	Ryan Harrison	M	1	—	—	—	—	1 (**2017**)	—	—	—	—	—	—	—
101	Sloane Stephens	W	1	—	—	—	—	—	—	—	—	—	1 (**2017**)	—	—
102	Nicole Melichar	W	1	—	—	—	—	—	—	—	—	1 (**2018**)	—	—	—
103	CoCo Vandeweghe	W	1	—	—	—	—	—	—	—	—	—	—	1 (**2018**)	—
104	Rajeev Ram	M	6	—	1 (2020)	2 (**2019**)	—	—	—	—	—	—	—	3 (2021)	—
105	Sofia Kenin	W	1	1 (**2020**)	—	—	—	—	—	—	—	—	—	—	—
106	Desirae Krawczyk	W	4	—	—	—	—	—	1 (**2021**)	—	—	2 (2021)	—	—	1 (2021)
107	Austin Krajicek	M	1	—	—	—	—	1 (**2023**)	—	—	—	—	—	—	—
108	Coco Gauff	W	3	—	—	—	1 (2025)	1 (2024)	—	—	—	—	1 (**2023**)	—	—
109	Taylor Townsend	W	4	—	1 (2025)	—	—	1 (2026)	—	—	1 (**2024**)	—	—	1 (2026) ☆	—
110	Madison Keys	W	1	1 (**2025**)	—	—	—	—	—	—	—	—	—	—	—
111	Christian Harrison	M	2	—	1 (**2026**)	—	—	—	—	—	—	—	—	1 (2026)	—
No.	Player	M/W	Total	Singles	D	M	Singles	D	M	Singles	D	M	Singles	D	M
No.	Player	M/W	Total	Australian Open			French Open			Wimbledon			US Open		

=== Uruguay ===
No.	Player	M/W	Total	Australian Open			French Open			Wimbledon			US Open		
No.	Player	M/W	Total	Singles	Doubles	Mixed	Singles	Doubles	Mixed	Singles	Doubles	Mixed	Singles	Doubles	Mixed
1	Fiorella Bonicelli	W	**2**	—	—	—	—	1 (1976)	1 (**1975**)	—	—	—	—	—	—
2	Pablo Cuevas	M	1	—	—	—	—	1 (**2008**)	—	—	—	—	—	—	—

=== Yugoslavia (1945–1991) ===
No.	Player	M/W	Total	Australian Open			French Open			Wimbledon			US Open		
No.	Player	M/W	Total	Singles	Doubles	Mixed	Singles	Doubles	Mixed	Singles	Doubles	Mixed	Singles	Doubles	Mixed
1	Nikola Pilić	M	1	—	—	—	—	—	—	—	—	—	—	1 (**1970**)	—
2	Mima Jaušovec	W	2	—	—	—	1 (**1977**)	1 (1978)	—	—	—	—	—	—	—
3	Slobodan Živojinović	M	1	—	—	—	—	—	—	—	—	—	—	1 (**1986**)	—
4	Monika Seleš	W	**5** (9)	2 (1991)	—	—	2 (**1990**)	—	—	—	—	—	1 (1991)	—	—

=== Zimbabwe ===
No.	Player	M/W	Total	Australian Open			French Open			Wimbledon			US Open		
No.	Player	M/W	Total	Singles	Doubles	Mixed	Singles	Doubles	Mixed	Singles	Doubles	Mixed	Singles	Doubles	Mixed
1	Byron Black	M	1	—	—	—	—	1 (**1994**)	—	—	—	—	—	—	—
2	Wayne Black	M	4	—	1 (2005)	—	—	—	1 (2002)	—	—	1 (2004)	—	1 (**2001**)	—
3	Kevin Ullyett	M	3	—	1 (2005)	1 (2002)	—	—	—	—	—	—	—	1 (**2001**)	—
4	Cara Black	W	**10**	—	1 (2007)	1 (2010) ☆	—	—	1 (**2002**)	—	3 (2004)	2 (2004)	—	1 (2008)	1 (2008)

== Totals by country ==
No.	Total	Country	By discipline			Australian Open			French Open			Wimbledon			US Open		
No.	Total	Country	S	D	M	Singles	Doubles	Mixed	Singles	Doubles	Mixed	Singles	Doubles	Mixed	Singles	Doubles	Mixed
1	538	United States	139	282	117	32	65	17	19	58	28	44	79	30	44	80	42
2	244	Australia	43	147	54	16	60	11	7	16	9	10	43	17	10	28	17
3	70	Spain	38	25	9	3	4	1	24	13	5	5	1	—	6	7	3
4	60	France	6	40	14	2	8	1	2	20	10	2	4	3	—	8	—
5	58	Czech Republic	6	37	14	1	5	3	1	11	2	5	10	7	—	11	2
6	54	Switzerland	28	17	9	10	5	2	2	5	2	9	4	2	7	3	3
7	50	South Africa	1	26	23	1	6	3	—	5	6	—	7	7	—	8	7
=	50	Sweden	25	25	0	6	7	—	9	6	—	7	7	—	3	5	—
9	46	Germany	32	11	3	7	—	—	6	4	1	12	4	1	7	3	1
10	42	Czechoslovakia	15	17	10	4	4	2	6	6	5	1	5	2	4	2	1
=	42	United Kingdom	9	14	19	1	3	3	1	3	2	4	2	9	3	6	5
12	41	Russia	13	18	10	3	5	4	5	5	2	1	2	2	4	6	2
13	39	Netherlands	1	23	14	—	3	1	—	8	6	1	5	2	—	7	5
14	38	India	0	16	22	—	3	6	—	5	5	—	3	6	—	5	5
15	32	Belarus	2	23	7	2	4	1	—	9	1	—	4	1	—	6	4
16	31	Italy	8	16	7	2	7	—	2	5	2	2	2	—	2	2	5
17	28	Serbia	24	3	4	9	—	1	3	1	1	6	2	2	3	—	—
18	19	Argentina	7	10	2	2	2	—	2	4	2	—	1	—	3	3	—
=	19	Belgium	11	8	0	2	2	—	4	3	—	—	2	—	5	1	—
20	18	Zimbabwe	0	10	8	—	3	2	—	1	2	—	3	3	—	3	1
=	18	Croatia	3	8	7	—	3	2	1	2	2	1	2	2	1	1	1
22	17	Canada	1	10	6	—	1	4	—	4	1	—	3	1	1	2	—
23	15	Romania	5	7	3	—	—	1	3	3	—	1	2	2	1	2	—
24	13	Brazil	3	6	4	—	1	1	3	1	1	—	1	—	—	3	2
25	11	China	2	8	1	1	3	1	1	1	—	—	3	—	—	1	—
=	11	Japan	4	4	3	2	—	1	—	1	1	—	2	—	2	1	1
=	11	Poland	6	3	2	—	2	1	4	—	—	1	1	1	1	—	—
=	11	Taiwan	0	7	4	—	1	1	—	1	2	—	4	1	—	1	—
29	9	Yugoslavia	6	3	—	2	—	—	3	1	—	—	—	—	1	2	—
30	8	Austria	2	4	2	—	1	—	1	—	—	—	1	2	1	2	—
31	7	Soviet Union	0	6	1	—	—	1	—	3	—	—	2	—	—	1	—
=	7	Hungary	0	7	0	—	2	—	—	4	—	—	1	—	—	—	—
33	6	Slovenia	0	1	5	—	—	1	—	—	3	—	1	—	—	—	1
=	6	Colombia	0	4	2	—	—	1	—	—	1	—	2	—	—	2	—
=	6	Latvia	1	1	4	—	—	2	1	—	1	—	—	1	—	1	—
36	5	Mexico	0	3	2	—	—	—	—	2	2	—	1	—	—	—	—
=	5	Serbia and Montenegro	3	0	2	1	—	1	1	—	1	—	—	—	1	—	—
=	5	Slovakia	0	1	4	—	1	1	—	—	1	—	—	1	—	—	1
39	4	Israel	0	2	2	—	2	—	—	—	1	—	—	1	—	—	—
=	4	Ukraine	0	3	1	—	2	—	—	—	—	—	—	1	—	1	—
=	4	Bahamas	0	3	1	—	1	—	—	1	—	—	—	1	—	1	—
42	3	Ecuador	1	2	0	—	—	—	1	1	—	—	—	—	—	1	—
=	3	Uruguay	0	2	1	—	—	—	—	2	1	—	—	—	—	—	—
=	3	New Zealand	0	3	0	—	1	—	—	2	—	—	—	—	—	—	—
45	2	Kazakhstan	0	2	0	—	—	—	—	—	—	—	1	—	—	1	—
=	2	Finland	0	1	1	—	1	—	—	—	—	—	—	1	—	—	—
=	2	Denmark	1	1	0	1	—	—	—	—	—	—	1	—	—	—	—
48	1	Bulgaria	0	0	1	—	—	—	—	—	—	—	—	—	—	—	1
=	1	Peru	0	1	0	—	—	—	—	1	—	—	—	—	—	—	—

== See also ==
- List of Grand Slam singles champions by country
