= List of Grand Slam singles champions by country =

This is an all-time list of winners of the four Grand Slam men's and women's singles tennis tournaments, organized by country. The year of the first win in each tournament is shown in parentheses. Each player's first grand slam tournament win is shown in bold. The greatest number of wins in each country (in the total column) is shown in bold.

== Grand Slam singles champions by country ==
=== Argentina ===
No.	Player	M/W	Total	Australian Open	French Open	Wimbledon	US Open
1	Guillermo Vilas	M	**4**	2 (1978^{Dec})	1 (**1977**)	–	1 (1977)
2	Gabriela Sabatini	W	1	–	–	–	1 (**1990**)
3	Gastón Gaudio	M	1	–	1 (**2004**)	–	–
4	Juan Martín del Potro	M	1	–	–	–	1 (**2009**)

=== Australia ===
No.	Player	M/W	Total	Australian Open	French Open	Wimbledon	US Open
1	Rodney Heath	M	2	2 (**1905**)	–	–	–
2	Norman Brookes	M	3	1 (1911)	–	2 (**1907**)	–
3	Horace Rice	M	1	1 (**1907**)	–	–	–
4	Ernie Parker	M	1	1 (**1913**)	–	–	–
5	Arthur O'Hara Wood	M	1	1 (**1914**)	–	–	–
6	Gerald Patterson	M	3	1 (1927)	–	2 (**1919**)	–
7	Pat O'Hara Wood	M	2	2 (**1920**)	–	–	–
8	Rhys Gemmell	M	1	1 (**1921**)	–	–	–
9	James Anderson	M	3	3 (**1922**)	–	–	–
10	Margaret Mutch	W	2	2 (**1922**)	–	–	–
11	Sylvia Lance	W	1	1 (**1924**)	–	–	–
12	Daphne Akhurst	W	5	5 (**1925**)	–	–	–
13	John Hawkes	M	1	1 (**1926**)	–	–	–
14	Esna Boyd	W	1	1 (**1927**)	–	–	–
15	Edgar Moon	M	1	1 (**1930**)	–	–	–
16	Jack Crawford	M	6	4 (**1931**)	1 (1933)	1 (1933)	–
17	Coral McInnes	W	2	2 (**1931**)	–	–	–
18	Joan Hartigan	W	3	3 (**1933**)	–	–	–
19	Adrian Quist	M	3	3 (**1936**)	–	–	–
20	Nancye Wynne	W	6	6 (**1937**)	–	–	–
21	Vivian McGrath	M	1	1 (**1937**)	–	–	–
22	John Bromwich	M	2	2 (**1939**)	–	–	–
23	Emily Hood	W	1	1 (**1939**)	–	–	–
24	Dinny Pails	M	1	1 (**1947**)	–	–	–
25	Frank Sedgman	M	5	2 (**1949**)	–	1 (1952)	2 (1951)
26	Thelma Coyne	W	2	2 (**1952**)	–	–	–
27	Ken McGregor	M	1	1 (**1952**)	–	–	–
28	Ken Rosewall	M	8	4 (**1953**)	2 (1953)	–	2 (1956)
29	Mervyn Rose	M	2	1 (**1954**)	1 (1958)	–	–
30	Beryl Penrose	W	1	1 (**1955**)	–	–	–
31	Lew Hoad	M	4	1 (**1956**)	1 (1956)	2 (1956)	–
32	Mary Carter	W	2	2 (**1956**)	–	–	–
33	Ashley Cooper	M	4	2 (**1957**)	–	1 (1958)	1 (1958)
34	Mal Anderson	M	1	–	–	–	1 (**1957**)
35	Neale Fraser	M	3	–	–	1 (1960)	2 (**1959**)
36	Margaret Smith	W	**24**	11 (**1960**)	5 (1962)	3 (1963)	5 (1962)
37	Rod Laver	M	11	3 (**1960**)	2 (1962)	4 (1961)	2 (1962)
38	Roy Emerson	M	12	6 (**1961**)	2 (1963)	2 (1964)	2 (1961)
39	Lesley Turner	W	2	–	2 (**1963**)	–	–
40	Fred Stolle	M	2	–	1 (**1965**)	–	1 (1966)
41	Tony Roche	M	1	–	1 (**1966**)	–	–
42	John Newcombe	M	7	2 (1973)	—	3 (**1967**)	2 (1967)
43	Bill Bowrey	M	1	1 (**1968**)	–	–	–
44	Evonne Goolagong	W	7	4 (1974)	1 (**1971**)	2 (1971)	–
45	Mark Edmondson	M	1	1 (**1976**)	—	–	–
46	Kerry Melville	W	1	1 (**1977^{Jan}**)	—	—	–
47	Christine O'Neil	W	1	1 (**1978^{Dec}**)	—	—	–
48	Pat Cash	M	1	–	—	1 (**1987**)	–
49	Patrick Rafter	M	2	–	—	–	2 (**1997**)
50	Lleyton Hewitt	M	2	–	—	1 (2002)	1 (**2001**)
51	Samantha Stosur	W	1	–	—	—	1 (**2011**)
52	Ashleigh Barty	W	3	1 (2022)	1 (**2019**)	1 (2021)	—

=== Austria ===
No.	Player	M/W	Total	Australian Open	French Open	Wimbledon	US Open
1	Thomas Muster	M	**1**	–	1 (**1995**)	–	–
2	Dominic Thiem	M	**1**	–	–	–	1 (**2020**)

=== Belarus ===
No.	Player	M/W	Total	Australian Open	French Open	Wimbledon	US Open
1	Victoria Azarenka	W	**2**	2 (2012)	—	—	—

- Note- On 1 March 2022, the WTA announced that players from Belarus will not be allowed to compete under the name or flag of Belarus following the 2022 Russian invasion of Ukraine. This affected Aryna Sabalenka as she competed for no nation at the time of her 4 victories.

=== Belgium ===
No.	Player	M/W	Total	Australian Open	French Open	Wimbledon	US Open
1	Justine Henin	W	**7**	1 (2004)	4 (**2003**)	—	2 (2003)
2	Kim Clijsters	W	4	1 (2011)	—	—	3 (**2005**)

=== Brazil ===
No.	Player	M/W	Total	Australian Open	French Open	Wimbledon	US Open
1	Maria Bueno	W	**7**	–	–	3 (**1959**)	4 (1959)
2	Gustavo Kuerten	M	3	–	3 (**1997**)	–	–

=== Canada ===
No.	Player	M/W	Total	Australian Open	French Open	Wimbledon	US Open
1	Bianca Andreescu	W	**1**	—	—	—	1 (**2019**)

=== Chile ===
No.	Player	M/W	Total	Australian Open	French Open	Wimbledon	US Open
1	Anita Lizana	W	**1**	–	–	–	1 (**1937**)

=== China ===
No.	Player	M/W	Total	Australian Open	French Open	Wimbledon	US Open
1	Li Na	W	**2**	1 (2014)	1 (**2011**)	–	–

=== Croatia ===
No.	Player	M/W	Total	Australian Open	French Open	Wimbledon	US Open
1	Iva Majoli	W	**1**	–	1 (**1997**)	–	–
2	Goran Ivanišević	M	**1**	–	–	1 (**2001**)	–
3	Marin Čilić	M	**1**	–	–	–	1 (**2014**)

=== Czechoslovakia ===
No.	Player	M/W	Total	Australian Open	French Open	Wimbledon	US Open
1	Jan Kodeš	M	3	–	2 (**1970**)	1 (1973)	–
2	Hana Mandlíková	W	4	2 (**1980^{Dec}**)	1 (1981)	–	1 (1985)
3	Ivan Lendl	M	**8**	2 (1989)	3 (**1984**)	–	3 (1985)

=== Czech Republic ===
No.	Player	M/W	Total	Australian Open	French Open	Wimbledon	US Open
1	Petr Korda	M	1	1 (**1998**)	–	–	–
2	Jana Novotná	W	1	–	–	1 (**1998**)	–
3	Petra Kvitová	W	**2**	–	–	2 (**2011**)	–
4	Barbora Krejčíková	W	**2**	–	1 (**2021**)	1 (2024)	–
5	Markéta Vondroušová	W	1	–	–	1 (**2023**)	–
6	Linda Nosková	W	1	–	–	1 (**2026**)	–

=== Denmark ===
No.	Player	M/W	Total	Australian Open	French Open	Wimbledon	US Open
1	Hilde Krahwinkel	W	**3**	–	3 (**1935**)	–	–
2	Caroline Wozniacki	W	1	1 (**2018**)	–	–	–

=== Ecuador ===
No.	Player	M/W	Total	Australian Open	French Open	Wimbledon	US Open
1	Andrés Gómez	M	**1**	–	1 (**1990**)	–	–

=== Egypt ===
No.	Player	M/W	Total	Australian Open	French Open	Wimbledon	US Open
1	Jaroslav Drobný	M	**3**	–	2 (**1951**)	1 (1954)	–

=== France ===
No.	Player	M/W	Total	Australian Open	French Open	Wimbledon	US Open
1	Suzanne Lenglen	W	**8**	–	2 (1925)	6 (**1919**)	–
2	Jean Borotra	M	4	1 (1928)	1 (1931)	2 (**1924**)	–
3	René Lacoste	M	7	–	3 (**1925**)	2 (1925)	2 (1926)
4	Henri Cochet	M	7	–	4 (**1926**)	2 (1927)	1 (1928)
5	Simonne Mathieu	W	2	–	2 (**1938**)	–	–
6	Marcel Bernard	M	1	–	1 (**1946**)	–	–
7	Yvon Petra	M	1	–	–	1 (**1946**)	–
8	Nelly Landry	W	1	–	1 (**1948**)	–	–
9	Françoise Dürr	W	1	–	1 (**1967**)	–	–
10	Yannick Noah	M	1	–	1 (**1983**)	–	–
11	Mary Pierce	W	2	1 (**1995**)	1 (2000)	–	–
12	Amélie Mauresmo	W	2	1 (**2006**)	–	1 (2006)	–
13	Marion Bartoli	W	1	–	–	1 (**2013**)	–

=== Germany ===
No.	Player	M/W	Total	Australian Open	French Open	Wimbledon	US Open
1	Cilly Aussem	W	2	–	1 (**1931**)	1 (1931)	–
2	Gottfried von Cramm	M	2	–	2 (**1934**)	–	–
3	Henner Henkel	M	1	–	1 (**1937**)	–	–
4	Boris Becker	M	6	2 (1991)	–	3 (**1985**)	1 (1989)
5	Steffi Graf	W	**22**	4 (1988)	6 (**1987**)	7 (1988)	5 (1988)
6	Michael Stich	M	1	–	–	1 (**1991**)	–
7	Angelique Kerber	W	3	1 (**2016**)	–	1 (2018)	1 (2016)
8	Alexander Zverev	M	2	–	1 (**2026**)	–	1 (2026)

=== Hungary ===
No.	Player	M/W	Total	Australian Open	French Open	Wimbledon	US Open
1	József Asbóth	M	**1**	–	1 (**1947**)	–	–
2	Zsuzsa Körmöczy	W	**1**	–	1 (**1958**)	–	–

=== Italy ===
No.	Player	M/W	Total	Australian Open	French Open	Wimbledon	US Open
1	Nicola Pietrangeli	M	2	–	2 (**1959**)	–	–
2	Adriano Panatta	M	1	–	1 (**1976**)	–	–
3	Francesca Schiavone	W	1	–	1 (**2010**)	–	–
4	Flavia Pennetta	W	1	–	–	–	1 (**2015**)
5	Jannik Sinner	M	**5**	2 (**2025**)	–	2 (**2025**)	1 (**2024**)

=== Japan ===
No.	Player	M/W	Total	Australian Open	French Open	Wimbledon	US Open
1	Naomi Osaka	W	**4**	2 (2019)	–	–	2 (**2018**)

=== Kazakhstan ===
No.	Player	M/W	Total	Australian Open	French Open	Wimbledon	US Open
1	Elena Rybakina	W	**3**	1 (2026)	-	1 (**2022**)	1 (2026)

=== Latvia ===
No.	Player	M/W	Total	Australian Open	French Open	Wimbledon	US Open
1	Jeļena Ostapenko	W	**1**	–	1 (**2017**)	–	–

=== Mexico ===
No.	Player	M/W	Total	Australian Open	French Open	Wimbledon	US Open
1	Rafael Osuna	M	**1**	–	–	–	1 (**1963**)

=== Netherlands ===
No.	Player	M/W	Total	Australian Open	French Open	Wimbledon	US Open
1	Kea Bouman	W	**1**	–	1 (**1927**)	–	–
2	Richard Krajicek	M	**1**	–	–	1 (**1996**)	–

=== New Zealand ===
No.	Player	M/W	Total	Australian Open	French Open	Wimbledon	US Open
1	Anthony Wilding	M	**6**	2 (**1906**)	–	4 (1910)	–

=== Norway ===
No.	Player	M/W	Total	Australian Open	French Open	Wimbledon	US Open
1	Molla Bjurstedt (Note: Also see United States)	W	**4** [8]	–	–	–	4 [8] (**1915**)

=== Poland ===
No.	Player	M/W	Total	Australian Open	French Open	Wimbledon	US Open
1	Iga Świątek	W	**6**	–	4 (**2020**)	1 (2025)	1 (2022)

=== Romania ===
No.	Player	M/W	Total	Australian Open	French Open	Wimbledon	US Open
1	Ilie Năstase	M	**2**	–	1 (1973)	–	1 (**1972**)
2	Virginia Ruzici	W	1	–	1 (**1978**)	–	–
3	Simona Halep	W	**2**	–	1 (**2018**)	1 (2019)	–

=== Russia ===
No.	Player	M/W	Total	Australian Open	French Open	Wimbledon	US Open
1	Yevgeny Kafelnikov	M	2	1 (1999)	1 (**1996**)	–	–
2	Marat Safin	M	2	1 (2005)	–	–	1 (**2000**)
3	Anastasia Myskina	W	1	–	1 (**2004**)	–	–
4	Maria Sharapova	W	**5**	1 (2008)	2 (2012)	1 (**2004**)	1 (2006)
5	Svetlana Kuznetsova	W	2	–	1 (2009)	–	1 (**2004**)
6	Daniil Medvedev	M	1	–	–	–	1 (**2021**)

- Note- On 1 March 2022, the WTA announced that players from Russia will not be allowed to compete under the name or flag of Russia following the 2022 Russian invasion of Ukraine. This affected Mirra Andreeva as she competed for no nation at the time of her 1 victory.

=== Serbia ===
No.	Player	M/W	Total	Australian Open	French Open	Wimbledon	US Open
1	Novak Djokovic	M	**24**	10 (**2008**)	3 (2016)	7 (2011)	4 (2011)
2	Ana Ivanovic	W	1	–	1 (**2008**)	–	–

=== South Africa ===
No.	Player	M/W	Total	Australian Open	French Open	Wimbledon	US Open
1	Johan Kriek	M	**1** [2]	1 [2] (**1981^{Dec}**)	–	–	–

=== Spain ===
No.	Player	M/W	Total	Australian Open	French Open	Wimbledon	US Open
1	Manuel Santana	M	4	–	2 (**1961**)	1 (1966)	1 (1965)
2	Andrés Gimeno	M	1	–	1 (**1972**)	–	–
3	Manuel Orantes	M	1	–	–	–	1 (**1975**)
4	Arantxa Sánchez	W	4	–	3 (**1989**)	–	1 (1994)
5	Sergi Bruguera	M	2	–	2 (**1993**)	–	–
6	Conchita Martínez	W	1	–	–	1 (**1994**)	–
7	Carlos Moyá	M	1	–	1 (**1998**)	–	–
8	Albert Costa	M	1	–	1 (**2002**)	–	–
9	Juan Carlos Ferrero	M	1	–	1 (**2003**)	–	–
10	Rafael Nadal	M	**22**	2 (2009)	14 (**2005**)	2 (2008)	4 (2010)
11	Garbiñe Muguruza	W	2	–	1 (**2016**)	1 (2017)	–
12	Carlos Alcaraz	M	7	1 (2026)	2 (2024)	2 (2023)	2 (**2022**)

=== Sweden ===
No.	Player	M/W	Total	Australian Open	French Open	Wimbledon	US Open
1	Sven Davidson	M	1	–	1 (**1957**)	–	–
2	Björn Borg	M	**11**	–	6 (**1974**)	5 (1976)	–
3	Mats Wilander	M	7	3 (1983)	3 (**1982**)	–	1 (1988)
4	Stefan Edberg	M	6	2 (**1985^{Dec}**)	–	2 (1988)	2 (1991)
5	Thomas Johansson	M	1	1 (**2002**)	–	–	–

=== Switzerland ===
No.	Player	M/W	Total	Australian Open	French Open	Wimbledon	US Open
1	Martina Hingis	W	5	3 (**1997**)	–	1 (1997)	1 (1997)
2	Roger Federer	M	**20**	6 (2004)	1 (2009)	8 (**2003**)	5 (2004)
3	Stan Wawrinka	M	3	1 (**2014**)	1 (2015)	–	1 (2016)

=== United Kingdom ===
No.	Player	M/W	Total	Australian Open	French Open	Wimbledon	US Open
1	Spencer Gore	M	1	–	–	1 (**1877**)	–
2	Frank Hadow	M	1	–	–	1 (**1878**)	–
3	John Hartley	M	2	–	–	2 (**1879**)	–
4	William Renshaw	M	7	–	–	7 (**1881**)	–
5	Maud Watson	W	2	–	–	2 (**1884**)	–
6	Blanche Bingley	W	6	–	–	6 (**1886**)	–
7	Lottie Dod	W	5	–	–	5 (**1887**)	–
8	Herbert Lawford	M	1	–	–	1 (**1887**)	–
9	Ernest Renshaw	M	1	–	–	1 (**1888**)	–
10	Willoughby Hamilton	M	1	–	–	1 (**1890**)	–
11	Lena Rice	W	1	–	–	1 (**1890**)	–
12	Wilfred Baddeley	M	3	–	–	3 (**1891**)	–
13	Mabel Cahill	W	2	–	–	–	2 (**1891**)
14	Joshua Pim	M	2	–	–	2 (**1893**)	–
15	Charlotte Cooper	W	5	–	–	5 (**1895**)	–
16	Harold Mahony	M	**1**	–	-	1 (**1896**)	–
17	Reginald Doherty	M	4	–	–	4 (**1897**)	–
18	Arthur Gore	M	3	–	–	3 (**1901**)	–
19	Laurence Doherty	M	6	–	–	5 (**1902**)	1 (1903)
20	Muriel Robb	W	1	–	–	1 (**1902**)	–
21	Dorothea Douglass	W	7	–	–	7 (**1903**)	–
22	Dora Boothby	W	1	–	–	1 (**1909**)	–
23	Ethel Thomson Larcombe	W	1	–	–	1 (**1912**)	–
24	James Cecil Parke	M	1	1 (**1912**)	–	–	–
25	Francis Lowe	M	1	1 (**1915**)	–	–	–
26	Algernon Kingscote	M	1	1 (**1919**)	–	–	–
27	Kathleen McKane	W	2	–	–	2 (**1924**)	–
28	Colin Gregory	M	1	1 (**1929**)	–	–	–
29	Betty Nuthall	W	1	–	–	–	1 (**1930**)
30	Margaret Scriven	W	2	–	2 (**1933**)	–	–
31	Fred Perry	M	**8**	1 (1934)	1 (1935)	3 (1934)	3 (**1933**)
32	Dorothy Round	W	3	1 (1935)	–	2 (**1934**)	–
33	Angela Mortimer	W	3	1 (1958)	1 (**1955**)	1 (1961)	–
34	Shirley Bloomer	W	1	–	1 (**1957**)	–	–
35	Christine Truman	W	1	–	1 (**1959**)	–	–
36	Ann Haydon	W	3	–	2 (**1961**)	1 (1969)	–
37	Virginia Wade	W	3	1 (1972)	–	1 (1977)	1 (**1968**)
38	Susan Barker	W	1	–	1 (**1976**)	–	–
39	Andy Murray	M	3	–	–	2 (2013)	1 (**2012**)
40	Emma Raducanu	W	1	–	–	–	1 (**2021**)

=== United States ===
No.	Player	M/W	Total	Australian Open	French Open	Wimbledon	US Open
1	Richard Sears	M	7	–	–	–	7 (**1881**)
2	Ellen Hansell	W	1	–	–	–	1 (**1887**)
3	Henry Slocum	M	2	–	–	–	2 (**1888**)
4	Bertha Townsend	W	2	–	–	–	2 (**1888**)
5	Oliver Campbell	M	3	–	–	–	3 (**1890**)
6	Ellen Roosevelt	W	1	–	–	–	1 (**1890**)
7	Robert Wrenn	M	4	–	–	–	4 (**1893**)
8	Aline Terry	W	1	–	–	–	1 (**1893**)
9	Helen Hellwig	W	1	–	–	–	1 (**1894**)
10	Juliette Atkinson	W	3	–	–	–	3 (**1895**)
11	Frederick Hovey	M	1	–	–	–	1 (**1895**)
12	Elisabeth Moore	W	4	–	–	–	4 (**1896**)
13	Malcolm Whitman	M	3	–	–	–	3 (**1898**)
14	Marion Jones	W	2	–	–	–	2 (**1899**)
15	Myrtle McAteer	W	1	–	–	–	1 (**1900**)
16	William Larned	M	7	–	–	–	7 (**1901**)
17	May Sutton	W	3	–	–	2 (1905)	1 (**1904**)
18	Holcombe Ward	M	1	–	–	–	1 (**1904**)
19	Beals Wright	M	1	–	–	–	1 (**1905**)
20	William Clothier	M	1	–	–	–	1 (**1906**)
21	Helen Homans	W	1	–	–	–	1 (**1906**)
22	Evelyn Sears	W	1	–	–	–	1 (**1907**)
23	Maud Barger-Wallach	W	1	–	–	–	1 (**1908**)
24	Fred Alexander	M	1	1 (**1908**)	–	–	–
25	Hazel Hotchkiss Wightman	W	4	–	–	–	4 (**1909**)
26	Mary Browne	W	3	–	–	–	3 (**1912**)
27	Maurice McLoughlin	M	2	–	–	–	2 (**1912**)
28	R. Norris Williams	M	2	–	–	–	2 (**1914**)
29	Bill Johnston	M	3	–	–	1 (1923)	2 (**1915**)
30	Robert Lindley Murray	M	2	–	–	–	2 (**1917**)
31	Bill Tilden	M	10	–	–	3 (**1920**)	7 (1920)
32	Molla Mallory (Note: Also see Norway)	W	4 [8]	–	–	–	4 [8] (**1920**)
33	Helen Wills	W	19	–	4 (1928)	8 (1927)	7 (**1923**)
34	John Doeg	M	1	–	–	–	1 (**1930**)
35	Sidney Wood	M	1	–	–	1 (**1931**)	–
36	Ellsworth Vines	M	3	–	–	1 (1932)	2 (**1931**)
37	Helen Jacobs	W	5	–	–	1 (1936)	4 (**1932**)
38	Wilmer Allison	M	1	–	–	–	1 (**1935**)
39	Alice Marble	W	5	–	–	1 (1939)	4 (**1936**)
40	Don Budge	M	6	1 (1938)	1 (1938)	2 (**1937**)	2 (1937)
41	Dorothy Bundy Cheney	W	1	1 (**1938**)	–	–	–
42	Don McNeill	M	2	–	1 (**1939**)	–	1 (1940)
43	Bobby Riggs	M	3	–	–	1 (**1939**)	2 (1939)
44	Sarah Palfrey	W	2	–	–	–	2 (**1941**)
45	Pauline Betz Addie	W	5	–	–	1 (1946)	4 (**1942**)
46	Ted Schroeder	M	2	–	–	1 (1949)	1 (**1942**)
47	Joe Hunt	M	1	–	–	–	1 (**1943**)
48	Frank Parker	M	4	–	2 (1948)	–	2 (**1944**)
49	Margaret Osborne duPont	W	6	–	2 (**1946**)	1 (1947)	3 (1948)
50	Jack Kramer	M	3	–	–	1 (1947)	2 (**1946**)
51	Patricia Canning Todd	W	1	–	1 (**1947**)	–	–
52	Louise Brough Clapp	W	6	1 (1950)	–	4 (1948)	1 (**1947**)
53	Bob Falkenburg	M	1	–	–	1 (**1948**)	–
54	Pancho Gonzales	M	2	–	–	–	2 (**1948**)
55	Doris Hart	W	6	1 (**1949**)	2 (1950)	1 (1951)	2 (1954)
56	Budge Patty	M	2	–	1 (**1950**)	1 (1950)	–
57	Art Larsen	M	1	–	–	–	1 (**1950**)
58	Dick Savitt	M	2	1 (**1951**)	–	1 (1951)	–
59	Shirley Fry	W	4	1 (1957)	1 (**1951**)	1 (1956)	1 (1956)
60	Maureen Connolly	W	9	1 (1953)	2 (1953)	3 (1952)	3 (**1951**)
61	Vic Seixas	M	2	–	–	1 (**1953**)	1 (1954)
62	Tony Trabert	M	5	–	2 (1954)	1 (1955)	2 (**1953**)
63	Althea Gibson	W	5	–	1 (**1956**)	2 (1957)	2 (1957)
64	Alex Olmedo	M	2	1 (**1959**)	–	1 (1959)	–
65	Darlene Hard	W	3	–	1 (**1960**)	–	2 (1960)
66	Karen Hantze Susman	W	1	–	–	1 (**1962**)	–
67	Chuck McKinley	M	1	–	–	1 (**1963**)	–
68	Billie Jean King	W	12	1 (1968)	1 (1972)	6 (**1966**)	4 (1967)
69	Nancy Richey	W	2	1 (**1967**)	1 (1968)	–	–
70	Arthur Ashe	M	3	1 (1970)	–	1 (1975)	1 (**1968**)
71	Stanley Smith	M	2	–	–	1 (1972)	1 (**1971**)
72	Jimmy Connors	M	8	1 (**1974**)	–	2 (1974)	5 (1974)
73	Chris Evert	W	18	2 (1982^{Dec})	7 (**1974**)	3 (1974)	6 (1975)
74	Roscoe Tanner	M	1	1 (**1977^{Jan}**)	–	–	–
75	Vitas Gerulaitis	M	1	1 (**1977^{Dec}**)	–	–	–
76	Martina Navratilova	W	18	3 (1981^{Dec})	2 (1982)	9 (**1978**)	4 (1983)
77	John McEnroe	M	7	–	–	3 (1981)	4 (**1979**)
78	Tracy Austin	W	2	–	–	–	2 (**1979**)
79	Barbara Jordan	W	1	1 (**1979^{Dec}**)	–	–	–
80	Brian Teacher	M	1	1 (**1980^{Dec}**)	–	–	–
81	Johan Kriek (Note: Also see South Africa)	M	1 [2]	1 [2] (**1982^{Dec}**)	–	–	–
82	Michael Chang	M	1	–	1 (**1989**)	–	–
83	Pete Sampras	M	14	2 (1994)	–	7 (1993)	5 (**1990**)
84	Jim Courier	M	4	2 (1992)	2 (**1991**)	–	–
85	Andre Agassi	M	8	4 (1995)	1 (1999)	1 (**1992**)	2 (1994)
86	Monica Seles (Note: Also see Yugoslavia)	W	1 [9]	1 [3] (**1996**)	– [4]	–	– [2]
87	Lindsay Davenport	W	3	1 (2000)	–	1 (1999)	1 (**1998**)
88	Serena Williams	W	**23**	7 (2003)	3 (2002)	7 (2002)	6 (**1999**)
89	Venus Williams	W	7	–	–	5 (**2000**)	2 (2000)
90	Jennifer Capriati	W	3	2 (**2001**)	1 (2001)	–	–
91	Andy Roddick	M	1	–	–	–	1 (**2003**)
92	Sloane Stephens	W	1	–	–	–	1 (**2017**)
93	Sofia Kenin	W	1	1 (**2020**)	–	–	–
94	Coco Gauff	W	2	–	1 (2025)	–	1 (**2023**)
95	Madison Keys	W	1	1 (**2025**)	–	–	–

=== (Socialist Federal Republic of Yugoslavia) (Federal Republic of Yugoslavia) Yugoslavia ===
No.	Player	M/W	Total	Australian Open	French Open	Wimbledon	US Open
1	Mima Jaušovec	W	1	—	1 (**1977**)	—	—
2	Monica Seles	W	**8** [9]	3 [4] (1991)	3 [3] (**1990**)	—	2 [2] (1991)

== Total Grand Slam titles by country ==
- United States: 353
- Australia: 165
- United Kingdom: 100
- Spain: 47
- France: 38
- Germany: 38
- Switzerland: 28
- Sweden: 26
- Serbia: 25
- Czechoslovakia: 18
- Russia: 13
- Belgium: 11
- Brazil: 10
- Yugoslavia: 10
- Italy: 10
- Czech Republic: 8
- Argentina: 7
- Poland: 6
- New Zealand: 6
- Romania: 5
- Denmark: 4
- Japan: 4
- Norway: 4
- Croatia: 3
- Egypt: 3
- Netherlands: 2
- Belarus: 2
- China: 2
- Hungary: 2
- Kazakhstan: 2
- Austria: 2
- Canada: 1
- Chile: 1
- Ecuador: 1
- Latvia: 1
- Mexico: 1
- South Africa: 1

== See also ==
- List of Grand Slam champions by country
